= 2023 Southeastern Conference baseball tournament =

2023 baseball tournament

- Teams: 12
- Format: See below
- Finals site: Hoover Metropolitan Stadium; Hoover, AL
- Champions: Vanderbilt (4th title)
- Winning coach: Tim Corbin (3rd title)
- MVP: RJ Austin (Vanderbilt)
- Attendance: 171,288 (record)
- Television: SEC Network, ESPN2 (Championship game)

2023 Southeastern Conference baseball standings
	Conf.						Overall
Team	W		L		T	PCT	W		L		T	PCT
Eastern
No. 2 Florida ^{x}‍†‍‍^{y}	20	–	10	–	0	.667	54	–	17	–	0	.761
No. 19 Vanderbilt ‍‍‡‍^{y}	19	–	11	–	0	.633	42	–	20	–	0	.677
No. 13 South Carolina ‍‍‍^{y}	16	–	13	–	0	.552	42	–	21	–	0	.667
No. 7 Tennessee ‍‍‍^{y}	16	–	14	–	0	.533	44	–	22	–	0	.667
No. 17 Kentucky ‍‍‍^{y}	16	–	14	–	0	.533	40	–	21	–	0	.656
Georgia ‍‍‍	11	–	19	–	0	.367	29	–	27	–	0	.518
Missouri ‍‍‍	10	–	20	–	0	.333	30	–	24	–	0	.556
Western
No. 16 Arkansas ^{x}‍†‍‍^{y}	20	–	10	–	0	.667	43	–	18	–	0	.705
No. 1 LSU ‍‍‍^{y}	19	–	10	–	0	.655	54	–	17	–	0	.761
Auburn ‍‍‍^{y}	17	–	13	–	0	.567	34	–	23	–	1	.595
No. 10 Alabama ‍‍‍^{y}	16	–	14	–	0	.533	43	–	21	–	0	.672
Texas A&M ‍‍‍^{y}	14	–	16	–	0	.467	38	–	27	–	0	.585
Mississippi State ‍‍‍	9	–	21	–	0	.300	27	–	26	–	0	.509
Ole Miss ‍‍‍	6	–	24	–	0	.200	25	–	29	–	0	.463
x – Division champion † – Conference champion ‡ – Tournament champion y – Invited to the NCAA tournament As of June 26, 2023; Rankings from D1Baseball

The 2023 Southeastern Conference baseball tournament was held from May 23 through 28 at Hoover Metropolitan Stadium in Hoover, Alabama. The annual tournament determined the tournament champion of the Division I Southeastern Conference in college baseball. The tournament champion earns the conference's automatic bid to the 2023 NCAA Division I baseball tournament

Original members Georgia and Kentucky along with 2013 addition Missouri have never won the tournament. This is the twenty-fourth consecutive year and twenty-sixth overall that the event has scheduled to be held at Hoover Metropolitan Stadium, known from 2007 through 2012 as Regions Park.

== Format and seeding ==
The regular season division winners claim the top two seeds and the next ten teams by conference winning percentage, regardless of division, claim the remaining berths in the tournament. The bottom eight teams play a single-elimination opening round, followed by a double-elimination format until the semifinals, when the format reverts to single elimination through the championship game. This is the tenth year of this format.

Team	W–L	Pct	GB No. 1	Seed
Eastern Division
Florida	20–10	.667	–	1
Vanderbilt	19–11	.633	1	4
South Carolina	16–13	.552	3.5	6
Tennessee	16–14	.533	4	7
Kentucky	16–14	.533	4	8
Georgia	11–19	.367	9	11
Missouri	10–20	.333	10	12

Team	W–L	Pct	GB No. 1	Seed
Western Division
Arkansas	20–10	.667	–	2
LSU	19–10	.655	0.5	3
Auburn	17–13	.567	3	5
Alabama	16–14	.533	4	9
Texas A&M	14–16	.467	6	10
Mississippi State	9–21	.300	11	
Ole Miss	6–24	.200	14	

== Bracket ==
First round
May 23
6	South Carolina	9
11	Georgia	0
May 23
7	Tennessee	0
10	Texas A&M	3
May 23
8	Kentucky	0
9	Alabama	4
May 23
5	Auburn	10
12	Missouri	4

Second round
May 24
3	LSU	10
6	South Carolina	3
May 24
2	Arkansas	6
10	Texas A&M	5^{11}
May 25
6	South Carolina	0
10	Texas A&M	5
May 24
1	Florida	7
9	Alabama	6^{11}
May 24
4	Vanderbilt	6
5	Auburn	4
May 25
9	Alabama	7
5	Auburn	4

Third round
May 25
3	LSU	4
2	Arkansas	5
May 26
3	LSU	4
10	Texas A&M	5
May 25
1	Florida	6
4	Vanderbilt	3
May 26
4	Vanderbilt	9
9	Alabama	2

Semifinals
May 27
2	Arkansas	4
10	Texas A&M	5
May 27
1	Florida	6
4	Vanderbilt	11

Final
May 28
10	Texas A&M	4
4	Vanderbilt	10

== Schedule ==
Game	Time*	Matchup^{#}	Score	Television	Attendance
Tuesday, May 23
1	9:30 a.m.	No. 6 South Carolina vs. No. 11 Georgia	9–0	SEC Network	5,510
2	1:00 p.m.	No. 7 Tennessee vs. No. 10 Texas A&M	0–3	SEC Network	5,510
3	4:30 p.m.	No. 8 Kentucky vs. No. 9 Alabama	0–4	SEC Network	10,315
4	8:00 p.m.	No. 5 Auburn vs. No. 12 Missouri	10–4	SEC Network	10,315
Wednesday, May 24
5	9:30 a.m.	No. 3 LSU vs. No. 6 South Carolina	10–3	SEC Network	7,825
6	1:00 p.m.	No. 2 Arkansas vs. No. 10 Texas A&M	6–5^{11}	SEC Network	7,825
7	4:30 p.m.	No. 1 Florida vs. No. 9 Alabama	7–6^{11}	SEC Network	12,685
8	8:00 p.m.	No. 4 Vanderbilt vs. No. 5 Auburn	6–4	SEC Network	12,685
Thursday, May 25
9	9:30 a.m.	No. 6 South Carolina vs. No. 10 Texas A&M	0–5	SEC Network	8,120
10	1:00 p.m.	No. 9 Alabama vs. No. 5 Auburn	7–4	SEC Network	8,120
11	4:30 p.m.	No. 3 LSU vs. No. 2 Arkansas	4–5	SEC Network	12,875
12	8:00 p.m.	No. 1 Florida vs. No. 4 Vanderbilt	6–3	SEC Network	12,875
Friday, May 26
13	3:00 p.m.	No. 10 Texas A&M vs. No. 3 LSU	5–4	SEC Network	15,012
14	6:30 p.m.	No. 9 Alabama vs. No. 4 Vanderbilt	2–9	SEC Network	15,012
Semifinals – Saturday, May 27
15	Noon	No. 10 Texas A&M vs. No. 2 Arkansas	5–4	SEC Network	8,938
16	3:30 p.m.	No. 4 Vanderbilt vs. No. 1 Florida	11–6	SEC Network	8,938
Championship – Sunday, May 28
17	2:00 p.m.	No. 10 Texas A&M vs. No. 4 Vanderbilt	4–10	ESPN2	8,728
*Game times in CDT. # – Rankings denote tournament seed.

== All-Tournament Team ==
The following players were named to the All-Tournament Team.

Pos.	Player	School
P	Troy Wansing	Texas A&M
P	Justin Lamkin	Texas A&M
C	BT Riopelle	Florida
DH	Chris Maldonaldo	Vanderbilt
1B	Jack Moss	Texas A&M
2B	RJ Austin	Vanderbilt
3B	Bryson Ware	Auburn
SS	Cole Foster	Auburn
OF	Andrew Pinckney	Alabama
OF	Tommy Seidl	Alabama
OF	Wyatt Langford	Florida

Bold is MVP.
