= 2023 Mississippi State Bulldogs baseball team =

American college baseball season

2023 Mississippi State Bulldogs baseball
- Conference: Southeastern Conference
- Western Division
- Record: 27–26 (9–21 SEC)
- Head coach: Chris Lemonis (5th season)
- Assistant coaches: Vacant; Jake Gautreau
- Home stadium: Dudy Noble Field

2023 Southeastern Conference baseball standings
| | Conf. | | | | | | Overall |
| Team | W | | L | | T | PCT | W | | L | | T | PCT |
|---|---|---|---|---|---|---|---|---|---|---|---|---|
Eastern
| No. 2 Florida ^{x}‍†‍‍^{y} | 20 | – | 10 | – | 0 | .667 | 54 | – | 17 | – | 0 | .761 |
| No. 19 Vanderbilt ‍‍‡‍^{y} | 19 | – | 11 | – | 0 | .633 | 42 | – | 20 | – | 0 | .677 |
| No. 13 South Carolina ‍‍‍^{y} | 16 | – | 13 | – | 0 | .552 | 42 | – | 21 | – | 0 | .667 |
| No. 7 Tennessee ‍‍‍^{y} | 16 | – | 14 | – | 0 | .533 | 44 | – | 22 | – | 0 | .667 |
| No. 17 Kentucky ‍‍‍^{y} | 16 | – | 14 | – | 0 | .533 | 40 | – | 21 | – | 0 | .656 |
| Georgia ‍‍‍ | 11 | – | 19 | – | 0 | .367 | 29 | – | 27 | – | 0 | .518 |
| Missouri ‍‍‍ | 10 | – | 20 | – | 0 | .333 | 30 | – | 24 | – | 0 | .556 |
Western
| No. 16 Arkansas ^{x}‍†‍‍^{y} | 20 | – | 10 | – | 0 | .667 | 43 | – | 18 | – | 0 | .705 |
| No. 1 LSU ‍‍‍^{y} | 19 | – | 10 | – | 0 | .655 | 54 | – | 17 | – | 0 | .761 |
| Auburn ‍‍‍^{y} | 17 | – | 13 | – | 0 | .567 | 34 | – | 23 | – | 1 | .595 |
| No. 10 Alabama ‍‍‍^{y} | 16 | – | 14 | – | 0 | .533 | 43 | – | 21 | – | 0 | .672 |
| Texas A&M ‍‍‍^{y} | 14 | – | 16 | – | 0 | .467 | 38 | – | 27 | – | 0 | .585 |
| Mississippi State ‍‍‍ | 9 | – | 21 | – | 0 | .300 | 27 | – | 26 | – | 0 | .509 |
| Ole Miss ‍‍‍ | 6 | – | 24 | – | 0 | .200 | 25 | – | 29 | – | 0 | .463 |
x – Division champion † – Conference champion ‡ – Tournament champion y – Invited to the NCAA tournament As of June 26, 2023; Rankings from D1Baseball

The 2023 Mississippi State Bulldogs baseball team represented Mississippi State University in the 2023 NCAA Division I baseball season. The Bulldogs played their home games at Dudy Noble Field.

== Previous season ==
In 2022, the Bulldogs finished 26–30, 9–21 in the SEC to finish in last place in the West. The Diamond Dawgs were coming off winning a national championship the year before.

== Coaching staff ==
2023 Mississippi State Bulldogs baseball coaching staff
- Chris Lemonis - Head coach - 5th year
- Scott Foxhall (fired May 1) - Assistant coach - 5th year
- Jake Gautreau - Assistant coach - 6th year
- Kyle Cheesebrough - Camps coordinator/Volunteer assistant - 5th year
- Bobby Austin - Player Development -
- Roger Rodeheaver - Director of Baseball Operations - 5th year
- Blake Loper - Coordinator of Baseball Operations -

== Schedule and results ==
2023 Mississippi State Bulldogs baseball game log
Regular season (27–26)

February (6–3)
| Date | Opponent | Rank | Site/stadium | Score | Win | Loss | Save | TV | Attendance | Overall record | SEC record |
|---|---|---|---|---|---|---|---|---|---|---|---|
| February 17 | VMI | – | Dudy Noble Field • Starkville, MS | **W** 11–2 | **Cade Smith (1–0)** | Roberto Velasquez (0–1) | none | SECN+ | 10,652 | 1–0 | – |
| February 18 | VMI | – | Dudy Noble Field • Starkville, MS | **L** 13–14 | JT Inskeep (1–0) | **Nate Dohm (0–1)** | Will Riley (1) | SECN+ | 12,213 | 1–1 | – |
| February 19 | VMI | – | Dudy Noble Field • Starkville, MS | **W** 9–3 | **Jurrangelo Cijntje (1–0)** | Nathan Light (0–1) | none | SECN+ | 11,005 | 2–1 | – |
| February 21 | Louisiana-Monroe | – | Dudy Noble Field • Starkville, MS | **L** 5–11 | Carson Orton (1–0) | **Bradley Loftin (0–1)** | none | SECN+ | 9,247 | 2–2 | – |
| February 22 | Louisiana-Monroe | – | Dudy Noble Field • Starkville, MS | **W** 14–3 | **Jurrangelo Cijntje (2–0)** | Brandt Corley (0–1) | none | SECN+ | 9,399 | 3–2 | – |
| February 24 | Arizona State | – | Dudy Noble Field • Starkville, MS | **L** 4–13 | Ross Dunn (1–0) | **Cade Smith (1–1)** | none | SECN+ | 11,136 | 3–3 | – |
| February 25 | Arizona State | – | Dudy Noble Field • Starkville, MS | **W** 5–1 | **Graham Yntema (1–0)** | Khristian Curtis (1–1) | **Nate Dohm (1)** | SECN+ | 14,320 | 4–3 | – |
| February 26 | Arizona State | – | Dudy Noble Field • Starkville, MS | **W** 16–3 | **Landon Gartman (1–0)** | Timmy Manning (0–1) | none | SECN+ | 11,043 | 5–3 | – |
| February 28 | vs. No. 25 Southern Miss | – | Trustmark Park • Pearl, MS | **W** 10–9 | **Nate Dohm (1–1)** | JB Middleton (0–1) | none | SECN+ | 6,542 | 6–3 | – |

March (10–9)
| Date | Opponent | Rank | Site/stadium | Score | Win | Loss | Save | TV | Attendance | Overall record | SEC record |
Frisco College Baseball Classic
| March 3 | vs. Ohio State | – | Riders Field • Frisco, TX | **L** 3–8 | Isaiah Coupet (2–1) | **Evan Siary (0–1)** | Jonah Jenkins (1) | D1Baseball | 5,175 | 6–4 | – |
| March 4 | vs. Oklahoma | – | Riders Field • Frisco, TX | **L** 9–15 | Jett Lodes (1–0) | **Graham Yntema (1–1)** | none | D1Baseball | 7,526 | 6–5 | – |
| March 5 | vs. California | – | Riders Field • Frisco, TX | **W** 8–4 | **Nate Dohm (2–1)** | Daniel Colwell (1–1) | none | D1Baseball | 5,410 | 7–5 | – |
| March 7 | Valparaiso | – | Dudy Noble Field • Starkville, MS | **W** 12–2^{7} | **Bradley Loftin (1–1)** | Grant Jablonski (0–1) | none | SECN+ | 9,486 | 8–5 | – |
| March 10 | Lipscomb | – | Dudy Noble Field • Starkville, MS | **W** 8–2 | **Jurrangelo Cijntje (3–0)** | Michae Dunkleberger (0–3) | **Evan Siary (1)** | SECN+ | 10,410 | 9–5 | – |
| March 11 | Lipscomb (DH-1) | – | Dudy Noble Field • Starkville, MS | **W** 4–3 | **Nate Dohm (3–1)** | Logan Van Treeck (1–2) | none | SECN+ | 10,977 | 10–5 | – |
| March 11 | Lipscomb (DH-2) | – | Dudy Noble Field • Starkville, MS | **W** 12–4 | **Tyler Davis (1–0)** | Collin Witze (0–1) | none | SECN+ | 10,977 | 11–5 | – |
| March 12 | Lipscomb | – | Dudy Noble Field • Starkville, MS | **moved to March 11, impending weather** | | | | | | | |
Hancock Whitney Classic
| March 14 | vs. Nicholls | – | MGM Park • Biloxi, MS | **W** 12–4 | **Brock Tapper (1–0)** | Chat Hayes (0–1) | none | SECN+ | 5,684 | 12–5 | – |
| March 15 | vs. Louisiana | – | MGM Park • Biloxi, MS | **W** 4–2 | **Colby Holcombe (1–0)** | Sam Hill (0–1) | **Nate Dohm (2)** | SECN+ | 5,816 | 13–5 | – |
| March 17 | at Kentucky | – | Kentucky Proud Park • Lexington, KY | **L** 5–6^{10} | Seth Chavez (2–0) | **Nate Dohm (3–2)** | none | SECN+ | 1,646 | 13–6 | 0–1 |
| March 18 | at Kentucky | – | Kentucky Proud Park • Lexington, KY | **L** 3–12 | Ryan Hagenow (2–0) | **Landon Gartman (1–1)** | none | SECN+ | 1,827 | 13–7 | 0–2 |
| March 19 | at Kentucky | – | Kentucky Proud Park • Lexington, KY | **L** 3–17^{7} | Ryder Giles (1–0) | **Graham Yntema (1–2)** | none | SECN | 1,680 | 13–8 | 0–3 |
| March 21 | Arkansas State | – | Dudy Noble Field • Starkville, MS | **W** 16–2 | **Bradley Loftin (2–1)** | Chase Armstrong (1–1) | none | SECN+ | 9,215 | 14–8 | – |
| March 24 | No. 4 Vanderbilt | – | Dudy Noble Field • Starkville, MS | **L** 3–26^{7} | Carter Holton (3–0) | **Jurrangelo Cijntje (3–1)** | none | SECN+ | 11,080 | 14–9 | 0–4 |
| March 25 | No. 4 Vanderbilt | – | Dudy Noble Field • Starkville, MS | **L** 5–18 | Hunter Owen (3–0) | **Landon Gartman (1–2)** | none | SECN+ | 12,927 | 14–10 | 0–5 |
| March 26 | No. 4 Vanderbilt | – | Dudy Noble Field • Starkville, MS | **L** 7–11 | Sam Hliboki (3–2) | **Nate Dohm (3–3)** | none | SECN+ | 9,872 | 14–11 | 0–6 |
| March 28 | Samford | – | Dudy Noble Field • Starkville, MS | **W** 9–4 | **Brock Tapper (2–0)** | Heath Clevenger (0–1) | **KC Hunt (1)** | SECN+ | 8,971 | 15–11 | – |
| March 30 | No. 9 South Carolina | – | Dudy Noble Field • Starkville, MS | **L** 4–6 | James Hicks (4–0) | **Colby Holcombe (1–1)** | Cade Austin (1) | SECN | 9,854 | 15–12 | 0–7 |
| March 31 | No. 9 South Carolina | – | Dudy Noble Field • Starkville, MS | **W** 13–3^{7} | **Landon Gartman (2–2)** | Noah Hall (5–1) | none | SECN+ | 10,385 | 16–12 | 1–7 |

April (8–8)
| Date | Opponent | Rank | Site/stadium | Score | Win | Loss | Save | TV | Attendance | Overall record | SEC record |
|---|---|---|---|---|---|---|---|---|---|---|---|
| April 1 | No. 9 South Carolina | – | Dudy Noble Field • Starkville, MS | **L** 5–14 | James Hicks (5–0) | **KC Hunt (0–1)** | none | SECN+ | 12,357 | 16–13 | 1–8 |
| April 4 | Grambling | – | Dudy Noble Field • Starkville, MS | **W** 21–2^{7} | **Parker Stinnett (1–0)** | Jacorey Boudreaux (0–2) | none | SECN+ | 9,343 | 17–13 | – |
| April 6 | at Alabama | – | Sewell–Thomas Stadium • Tuscaloosa, AL | **W** 12–8 | **Colby Holcombe (2–1)** | Connor Ball (1–1) | **KC Hunt (2)** | SECN+ | 3,409 | 18–13 | 2–8 |
| April 7 | at Alabama | – | Sewell–Thomas Stadium • Tuscaloosa, AL | **L** 1–11^{7} | Luke Holman (5–1) | **Jurrangelo Cijntje (3–2)** | none | SECN+ | 3,418 | 18–14 | 2–9 |
| April 8 | at Alabama | – | Sewell–Thomas Stadium • Tuscaloosa, AL | **W** 8–4 | **Nate Dohm (4–3)** | Aidan Moza (0–1) | none | ESPNU | 4,393 | 19–14 | 3–9 |
| April 11 | at UAB | – | Young Memorial Field • Birmingham, AL | **W** 7–3 | **Parker Stinnett (2–0)** | Braxton Shelton (1–2) | none | ESPN+ | 808 | 20–14 | – |
Super Bulldog Weekend
| April 14 | Ole Miss | – | Dudy Noble Field • Starkville, MS | **L** 2–3 | Mitch Murrell (2–1) | **Colby Holcombe (2–2)** | none | SECN+ | 14,739 | 20–15 | 3–10 |
| April 15 | Ole Miss | – | Dudy Noble Field • Starkville, MS | **W** 8–7 | **Nate Dohm (5–3)** | Sam Tookoian (1–1) | none | SECN | 16,423† | 21–15 | 4–10 |
| April 16 | Ole Miss | – | Dudy Noble Field • Starkville, MS | **W** 5–3 | **Aaron Nixon (1–0)** | Jackson Kimbrell (0–3) | none | SECN+ | 12,824 | 22–15 | 5–10 |
| April 18 | Southern | – | Dudy Noble Field • Starkville, MS | **canceled, scheduling conflict** | | | | | | | |
| April 21 | at Auburn | – | Plainsman Park • Auburn, AL | **L** 1–2 | Tanner Bauman (3–1) | **Nate Dohm (5–4)** | Will Cannon (4) | SECN+ | 4,096 | 22–16 | 5–11 |
| April 22 | at Auburn | – | Plainsman Park • Auburn, AL | **W** 11–10 | **KC Hunt (1–1)** | John Armstrong (6–2) | **Aaron Nixon (1)** | SECN+ | 4,096 | 23–16 | 6–11 |
| April 23 | at Auburn | – | Plainsman Park • Auburn, AL | **L** 11–12 | Konner Copeland (2–1) | **Aaron Nixon (1–1)** | none | SECN+ | 4,096 | 23–17 | 6–12 |
| April 25 | vs. Ole Miss; Governor's Cup | – | Trustmark Park • Pearl, MS | **W** 2–1 | **Evan Siary (1–1)** | Grayson Saunier (2–3) | **Aaron Nixon (2)** | SECN+ | 6,601 | 24–17 | – |
| April 27 | at No. 24 Tennessee | – | Lindsey Nelson Stadium • Knoxville, TN | **L** 7–8 | Chase Burns (4–3) | **KC Hunt (1–2)** | none | SECN | 4,011 | 24–18 | 6–13 |
| April 28 | at No. 24 Tennessee | – | Lindsey Nelson Stadium • Knoxville, TN | **L** 8–12 | Camden Sewell (3–0) | **Brock Tapper (2–1)** | none | SECN+ | 4,471 | 24–19 | 6–14 |
| April 29 | at No. 24 Tennessee | – | Lindsey Nelson Stadium • Knoxville, TN | **L** 2–13^{7} | Drew Beam (6–2) | **Jurrangelo Cijntje (3–3)** | none | ESPNU | 4,790 | 24–20 | 6–15 |

May (3–6)
| Date | Opponent | Rank | Site/stadium | Score | Win | Loss | Save | TV | Attendance | Overall record | SEC record |
|---|---|---|---|---|---|---|---|---|---|---|---|
| May 5 | No. 6 Arkansas | – | Dudy Noble Field • Starkville, MS | **L** 2–6 | Hagen Smith (7–1) | **Cade Smith (1–2)** | Gage Wood (5) | SECN+ | 10,871 | 24–21 | 6–16 |
| May 6 | No. 6 Arkansas | – | Dudy Noble Field • Starkville, MS | **L** 2–14^{7} | Brady Tygart (2–0) | **Landon Gartman (2–3)** | Will McEntire (1) | ESPN2 | 11,973 | 24–22 | 6–17 |
| May 7 | No. 6 Arkansas | – | Dudy Noble Field • Starkville, MS | **L** 6–11 | Zack Morris (1–3) | **Jurrangelo Cijntje (3–4)** | none | SECN+ | 9,882 | 24–23 | 6–18 |
| May 9 | Memphis | – | Dudy Noble Field • Starkville, MS | **canceled, inclement weather** | | | | | | | |
| May 12 | at No. 2 LSU | – | Alex Box Stadium, Skip Bertman Field • Baton Rouge, LA | **L** 1–12^{7} | Paul Skenes (10–1) | **Evan Siary (1–2)** | none | SECN | 12,304 | 24–24 | 6–19 |
| May 13 | at No. 2 LSU | – | Alex Box Stadium, Skip Bertman Field • Baton Rouge, LA | **W** 9–4 | **KC Hunt (2–2)** | Thatcher Hurd (3–2) | none | SECN+ | 11,904 | 25–24 | 7–19 |
| May 14 | at No. 2 LSU | – | Alex Box Stadium, Skip Bertman Field • Baton Rouge, LA | **W** 14–13^{10} | **Aaron Nixon (2–1)** | Riley Cooper (3–3) | none | SECN+ | 11,002 | 26–24 | 8–19 |
| May 16 | North Alabama | – | Dudy Noble Field • Starkville, MS | **canceled, inclement weather** | | | | | | | |
| May 18 | Texas A&M | – | Dudy Noble Field • Starkville, MS | **W** 10–8 | **Nate Dohm (6–4)** | Brandyn Garcia (2–3) | none | SECN+ | 9,744 | 27–24 | 9–19 |
| May 19 | Texas A&M | – | Dudy Noble Field • Starkville, MS | **L** 4–6 | Chris Cortez (3–0) | **Aaron Nixon (2–2)** | Evan Aschenbeck (2) | SECN+ | 10,848 | 27–25 | 9–20 |
| May 20 | Texas A&M | – | Dudy Noble Field • Starkville, MS | **L** 10–15 | Brad Rudis (5–0) | **Jurrangelo Cijntje (3–5)** | none | SECN+ | 10,665 | 27–26 | 9–21 |

Legend: = Win = Loss = Canceled
Bold = Mississippi State team member
Rankings are based on the team's current ranking in the D1Baseball poll.

† = NCAA All-time On-campus attendance record

== Record vs. conference opponents ==
Last two do not qualify for conf. tourn. Blank are not scheduled. Blue are home games, otherwise away.

2023 SEC baseball records Source: 2023 SEC baseball game results, 2023 SEC baseball schedule
| Team | W–L | ALA | ARK | AUB | FLA | UGA | KEN | LSU | MSU | MIZZ | MISS | SCAR | TENN | TAMU | VAN | Team | Div | SR | SW |
|---|---|---|---|---|---|---|---|---|---|---|---|---|---|---|---|---|---|---|---|
| ALA | 16–14 | | 1–2 | 2–1 | 1–2 | . | 1–2 | 0–3 | 1–2 | 3–0 | 3–0 | . | . | 2–1 | 2–1 | ALA | W4 | 5–5 | 2–1 |
| ARK | 20–10 | 2–1 | | 3–0 | . | 0–3 | . | 1–2 | 3–0 | . | 2–1 | 2–1 | 3–0 | 3–0 | 1–2 | ARK | W1 | 7–3 | 4–1 |
| AUB | 17–13 | 1–2 | 0–3 | | 1–2 | 2–1 | . | 2–1 | 2–1 | 3–0 | 3–0 | 2–1 | . | 1–2 | . | AUB | W3 | 6–4 | 2–1 |
| FLA | 20–10 | 2–1 | . | 2–1 | | 2–1 | 2–1 | . | . | 3–0 | 3–0 | 0–3 | 2–1 | 1–2 | 3–0 | FLA | E1 | 8–2 | 3–1 |
| UGA | 11–19 | . | 3–0 | 1–2 | 1–2 | | 2–1 | 1–2 | . | 0–3 | 1–2 | 0–3 | 2–1 | . | 0–3 | UGA | E6 | 3–7 | 1–3 |
| KEN | 16–14 | 2–1 | . | . | 1–2 | 1–2 | | 1–2 | 3–0 | 3–0 | . | 3–0 | 1–2 | 1–2 | 0–3 | KEN | E5 | 4–6 | 3–1 |
| LSU | 19–10 | 3–0 | 2–1 | 1–2 | . | 2–1 | 2–1 | | 1–2 | . | 3–0 | 1–1 | 2–1 | 2–1 | . | LSU | W2 | 7–2 | 2–0 |
| MSU | 9–21 | 2–1 | 0–3 | 1–2 | . | . | 0–3 | 2–1 | | . | 2–1 | 1–2 | 0–3 | 1–2 | 0–3 | MSU | W6 | 3–7 | 0–4 |
| MIZZ | 10–20 | 0–3 | . | 0–3 | 0–3 | 3–0 | 0–3 | . | . | | 2–1 | 0–3 | 3–0 | 1–2 | 1–2 | MIZZ | E7 | 3–7 | 2–5 |
| MISS | 6–24 | 0–3 | 1–2 | 0–3 | 0–3 | 2–1 | . | 0–3 | 1–2 | 1–2 | | . | . | 1–2 | 0–3 | MISS | W7 | 1–9 | 0–5 |
| SCAR | 16–13 | . | 1–2 | 1–2 | 3–0 | 3–0 | 0–3 | 1–1 | 2–1 | 3–0 | . | | 1–2 | . | 1–2 | SCAR | E3 | 4–5 | 3–1 |
| TENN | 16–14 | . | 0–3 | . | 1–2 | 1–2 | 2–1 | 1–2 | 3–0 | 0–3 | . | 2–1 | | 3–0 | 3–0 | TENN | E4 | 5–5 | 3–2 |
| TAMU | 14–16 | 1–2 | 0–3 | 2–1 | 2–1 | . | 2–1 | 1–2 | 2–1 | 2–1 | 2–1 | . | 0–3 | | . | TAMU | W5 | 6–4 | 0–2 |
| VAN | 19–11 | 1–2 | 2–1 | . | 0–3 | 3–0 | 3–0 | . | 3–0 | 2–1 | 3–0 | 2–1 | 0–3 | . | | VAN | E2 | 7–3 | 4–2 |
| Team | W–L | ALA | ARK | AUB | FLA | UGA | KEN | LSU | MSU | MIZZ | MISS | SCAR | TENN | TAMU | VAN | Team | Div | SR | SW |

Updated for entire regular season. Tiebrkrs: FLA>ARK VAN common. KEN&TENN>ALA LSU common. TENN>KEN hd–hd.

== Rankings ==
Ranking movements Legend: ██ Increase in ranking ██ Decrease in ranking — = Not ranked RV = Received votes
| | Week | | | | | | | | | | | | | | | | | | |
| Poll | Pre | 1 | 2 | 3 | 4 | 5 | 6 | 7 | 8 | 9 | 10 | 11 | 12 | 13 | 14 | 15 | 16 | 17 | Final |
|---|---|---|---|---|---|---|---|---|---|---|---|---|---|---|---|---|---|---|---|
| Coaches' | — | —* | — | — | — | — | | | | | | | | | | | | | |
| Baseball America | — | — | — | — | — | — | | | | | | | | | | | | | |
| Collegiate Baseball^ | 22 | 24 | — | — | — | — | | | | | | | | | | | | | |
| NCBWA† | 31 | RV | RV | RV | RV | — | | | | | | | | | | | | | |
| D1Baseball | — | — | — | — | — | — | | | | | | | | | | | | | |

^ Collegiate Baseball ranked 40 teams in their preseason poll, but only ranked 30 teams weekly during the season.
† NCBWA ranks 30 teams in their preseason poll, but only ranks 25 teams weekly during the season.
* A new poll was not released for this week, so for comparison purposes, the previous week's ranking is inserted in this week's slot.

== See also ==
- 2023 Mississippi State Bulldogs softball team
