= 2023 Georgia Bulldogs baseball team =

American college baseball season

2023 Georgia Bulldogs baseball
- Conference: Southeastern Conference
- Eastern Division
- Record: 29-27 (11-19 SEC)
- Head coach: Scott Stricklin (10th season)
- Assistant coaches: Scott Daeley; Sean Kenny
- Home stadium: Foley Field

2023 Southeastern Conference baseball standings
	Conf.						Overall
Team	W		L		T	PCT	W		L		T	PCT
Eastern
No. 2 Florida ^{x}‍†‍‍^{y}	20	–	10	–	0	.667	54	–	17	–	0	.761
No. 19 Vanderbilt ‍‍‡‍^{y}	19	–	11	–	0	.633	42	–	20	–	0	.677
No. 13 South Carolina ‍‍‍^{y}	16	–	13	–	0	.552	42	–	21	–	0	.667
No. 7 Tennessee ‍‍‍^{y}	16	–	14	–	0	.533	44	–	22	–	0	.667
No. 17 Kentucky ‍‍‍^{y}	16	–	14	–	0	.533	40	–	21	–	0	.656
Georgia ‍‍‍	11	–	19	–	0	.367	29	–	27	–	0	.518
Missouri ‍‍‍	10	–	20	–	0	.333	30	–	24	–	0	.556
Western
No. 16 Arkansas ^{x}‍†‍‍^{y}	20	–	10	–	0	.667	43	–	18	–	0	.705
No. 1 LSU ‍‍‍^{y}	19	–	10	–	0	.655	54	–	17	–	0	.761
Auburn ‍‍‍^{y}	17	–	13	–	0	.567	34	–	23	–	1	.595
No. 10 Alabama ‍‍‍^{y}	16	–	14	–	0	.533	43	–	21	–	0	.672
Texas A&M ‍‍‍^{y}	14	–	16	–	0	.467	38	–	27	–	0	.585
Mississippi State ‍‍‍	9	–	21	–	0	.300	27	–	26	–	0	.509
Ole Miss ‍‍‍	6	–	24	–	0	.200	25	–	29	–	0	.463
x – Division champion † – Conference champion ‡ – Tournament champion y – Invited to the NCAA tournament As of June 26, 2023; Rankings from D1Baseball

The 2023 Georgia Bulldogs baseball team represented the University of Georgia in the 2023 NCAA Division I baseball season. The Bulldogs played their home games for the 67th season at Foley Field.

== Previous season ==
The Bulldogs finished 36–23, 15–15 in the SEC to finish in a tie for 2nd place in the East Division with the Florida Gators. They were invited to play in the 2022 NCAA Division I baseball tournament and were placed in the Chapel Hill Super Regional. They lost to VCU 8–1, beat Hofstra 24–1, and finally lost to North Carolina 6–5, ending their season.

== Record vs. conference opponents ==
Last two do not qualify for conf. tourn. Blank are not scheduled. Blue are home games, otherwise away.

2023 SEC baseball records Source: 2023 SEC baseball game results, 2023 SEC baseball schedule
Team	W–L	ALA	ARK	AUB	FLA	UGA	KEN	LSU	MSU	MIZZ	MISS	SCAR	TENN	TAMU	VAN	Team	Div	SR	SW
ALA	16–14		1–2	2–1	1–2	.	1–2	0–3	1–2	3–0	3–0	.	.	2–1	2–1	ALA	W4	5–5	2–1
ARK	20–10	2–1		3–0	.	0–3	.	1–2	3–0	.	2–1	2–1	3–0	3–0	1–2	ARK	W1	7–3	4–1
AUB	17–13	1–2	0–3		1–2	2–1	.	2–1	2–1	3–0	3–0	2–1	.	1–2	.	AUB	W3	6–4	2–1
FLA	20–10	2–1	.	2–1		2–1	2–1	.	.	3–0	3–0	0–3	2–1	1–2	3–0	FLA	E1	8–2	3–1
UGA	11–19	.	3–0	1–2	1–2		2–1	1–2	.	0–3	1–2	0–3	2–1	.	0–3	UGA	E6	3–7	1–3
KEN	16–14	2–1	.	.	1–2	1–2		1–2	3–0	3–0	.	3–0	1–2	1–2	0–3	KEN	E5	4–6	3–1
LSU	19–10	3–0	2–1	1–2	.	2–1	2–1		1–2	.	3–0	1–1	2–1	2–1	.	LSU	W2	7–2	2–0
MSU	9–21	2–1	0–3	1–2	.	.	0–3	2–1		.	2–1	1–2	0–3	1–2	0–3	MSU	W6	3–7	0–4
MIZZ	10–20	0–3	.	0–3	0–3	3–0	0–3	.	.		2–1	0–3	3–0	1–2	1–2	MIZZ	E7	3–7	2–5
MISS	6–24	0–3	1–2	0–3	0–3	2–1	.	0–3	1–2	1–2		.	.	1–2	0–3	MISS	W7	1–9	0–5
SCAR	16–13	.	1–2	1–2	3–0	3–0	0–3	1–1	2–1	3–0	.		1–2	.	1–2	SCAR	E3	4–5	3–1
TENN	16–14	.	0–3	.	1–2	1–2	2–1	1–2	3–0	0–3	.	2–1		3–0	3–0	TENN	E4	5–5	3–2
TAMU	14–16	1–2	0–3	2–1	2–1	.	2–1	1–2	2–1	2–1	2–1	.	0–3		.	TAMU	W5	6–4	0–2
VAN	19–11	1–2	2–1	.	0–3	3–0	3–0	.	3–0	2–1	3–0	2–1	0–3	.		VAN	E2	7–3	4–2
Team	W–L	ALA	ARK	AUB	FLA	UGA	KEN	LSU	MSU	MIZZ	MISS	SCAR	TENN	TAMU	VAN	Team	Div	SR	SW

Updated for entire regular season. Tiebrkrs: FLA>ARK VAN common. KEN&TENN>ALA LSU common. TENN>KEN hd–hd.

== Rankings ==
Ranking movements
	Week																
Poll	Pre	1	2	3	4	5	6	7	8	9	10	11	12	13	14	15	Final
Coaches'		*															
Baseball America																	
NCBWA†																	

† NCBWA ranks 30 teams in their preseason poll, but only ranks 25 teams weekly during the season.
* A new poll was not released for this week, so for comparison purposes, the previous week's ranking is inserted in this week's slot.

== See also ==
- 2022 Georgia Bulldogs softball team
