= 2023 Arkansas Razorbacks baseball team =

American college baseball season

2023 Arkansas Razorbacks baseball
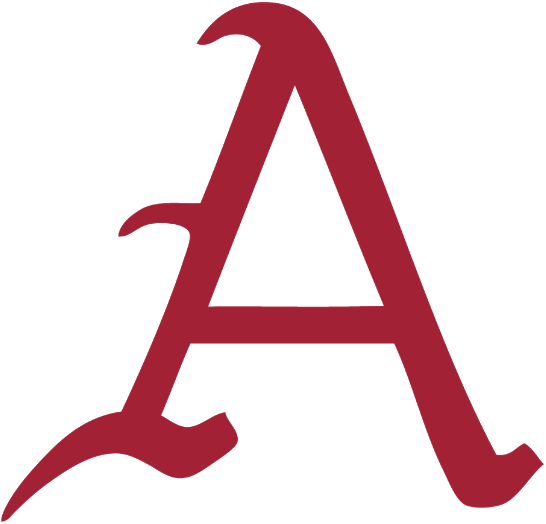

SEC regular season co-champions SEC Western Division champion

Fayetteville Regional, 2–2
- Conference: Southeastern Conference
- Western Division

Ranking
- Coaches: No. 2
- CB: No. 2
- Record: 43–18 (20–10 SEC)
- Head coach: Dave Van Horn (21st season)
- Assistant coaches: Matt Hobbs; Nate Thompson
- Home stadium: Baum–Walker Stadium

2023 Southeastern Conference baseball standings
	Conf.						Overall
Team	W		L		T	PCT	W		L		T	PCT
Eastern
No. 2 Florida ^{x}‍†‍‍^{y}	20	–	10	–	0	.667	54	–	17	–	0	.761
No. 19 Vanderbilt ‍‍‡‍^{y}	19	–	11	–	0	.633	42	–	20	–	0	.677
No. 13 South Carolina ‍‍‍^{y}	16	–	13	–	0	.552	42	–	21	–	0	.667
No. 7 Tennessee ‍‍‍^{y}	16	–	14	–	0	.533	44	–	22	–	0	.667
No. 17 Kentucky ‍‍‍^{y}	16	–	14	–	0	.533	40	–	21	–	0	.656
Georgia ‍‍‍	11	–	19	–	0	.367	29	–	27	–	0	.518
Missouri ‍‍‍	10	–	20	–	0	.333	30	–	24	–	0	.556
Western
No. 16 Arkansas ^{x}‍†‍‍^{y}	20	–	10	–	0	.667	43	–	18	–	0	.705
No. 1 LSU ‍‍‍^{y}	19	–	10	–	0	.655	54	–	17	–	0	.761
Auburn ‍‍‍^{y}	17	–	13	–	0	.567	34	–	23	–	1	.595
No. 10 Alabama ‍‍‍^{y}	16	–	14	–	0	.533	43	–	21	–	0	.672
Texas A&M ‍‍‍^{y}	14	–	16	–	0	.467	38	–	27	–	0	.585
Mississippi State ‍‍‍	9	–	21	–	0	.300	27	–	26	–	0	.509
Ole Miss ‍‍‍	6	–	24	–	0	.200	25	–	29	–	0	.463
x – Division champion † – Conference champion ‡ – Tournament champion y – Invited to the NCAA tournament As of June 26, 2023; Rankings from D1Baseball

The 2023 Arkansas Razorbacks baseball team represented the University of Arkansas in the 2023 season. The Razorbacks played their home games at Baum–Walker Stadium.

== Previous season ==
The Razorbacks finished in Omaha yet again, missing out on the championship series by one game, as they were eliminated by eventual national champion Ole Miss.

Arkansas won the Stillwater Regional and the Chapel Hill Super Regional to advance to the College World Series for the seventh time under Dave Van Horn and 11th time in school history.

== Schedule and results ==
2023 Arkansas Razorbacks baseball game log (43–18)
Regular season (39–15)

February (5–2)
Date	Opponent	Rank	Site/stadium	Score	Win	Loss	Save	TV	Attendance	Overall record	SEC record
College Baseball Showdown
February 17	vs. Texas	No. 8	Globe Life Field; Arlington, TX	**W** 3–2	**Adcock** (1–0)	Johnson (0–1)	Tygart (1)	FloSports	15,721	1–0	—
February 18	vs. No. 15 TCU	No. 8	Globe Life Field	**L** 6–18	Klecker (1–0)	**Morris (0–1)**	None	FloSports	20,295	1–1	—
February 19	vs. No. 9 Oklahoma State	No. 8	Globe Life Field	**W** 18–1 (7)	**Hollan** (1–0)	Root (0–1)	None	FloSports	17,567	2–1	—
February 21	Grambling State	No. 9	Baum–Walker Stadium; Fayetteville, AR	**W** 9–7	**Tygart** (1–0)	J. Martinez (0–1)	None	SEC Network+	9,247	3–1	—
February 24	Eastern Illinois	No. 9	Baum–Walker Stadium	**W** 13–2 (7)	**Smith** (1–0)	Malatestenic (0-1)	None	SEC Network+	8,956	4–1	—
February 25	Eastern Illinois	No. 9	Baum–Walker Stadium	**W** 10–3	**McEntire** (1–0)	Conklin (1–1)	None	SEC Network+	9,888	5–1	—
February 26	Eastern Illinois	No. 9	Baum–Walker Stadium	**L** 3–12	Hampton (2–0)	**Adcock** (1–1)	None	SEC Network+	9,097	5–2	—

March (16–3)
Date	Opponent	Rank	Site/stadium	Score	Win	Loss	Save	TV	Attendance	Overall record	SEC record
March 1	Illinois State	No. 8	Baum–Walker Stadium	**W** 10–9 (11)	**Carter** (1–0)	Dale (1–1)	None	SEC Network+	8,727	6–2	—
March 3	Wright State	No. 8	Baum–Walker Stadium	**W** 12–2 (8)	**Smith** (2–0)	Shirk (1–2)	None	SEC Network+	8,851	7–2	—
March 4	Wright State	No. 8	Baum–Walker Stadium	**W** 12–6	**McEntire** (2–0)	Gongora (1–1)	None	SEC Network+	10,530	8–2	—
March 5	Wright State	No. 8	Baum–Walker Stadium	**W** 6–2	**Hollan** (2–0)	Stofel (0–2)	Adcock (1)	SEC Network+	9,703	9–2	—
March 7	Army	No. 8	Baum–Walker Stadium	**W** 7–5	**Carter** (2–0)	Trippi (0-1)	None	SEC Network+	8,945	10–2	—
March 10	Louisiana Tech	No. 8	Baum–Walker Stadium	**W** 7–4	**Smith** (3–0)	Fincher (2–2)	Carter (1)	SEC Network+	9,273	11–2	—
March 11	Louisiana Tech	No. 8	Baum–Walker Stadium	**W** 6–1	**McEntire** (3–0)	Hector (1–2)	None	SEC Network+	10,086	12–2	—
March 12	Louisiana Tech	No. 8	Baum–Walker Stadium	**W** 15–6	**Hollan** (3–0)	Reed (0–2)	None	SEC Network+	9,117	13–2	—
March 14	UNLV	No. 7	Baum–Walker Stadium	**W** 13–7	**Carter** (3–0)	Rupp (1–3)	None	SEC Network+	8,701	14–2	—
March 15	UNLV	No. 7	Baum–Walker Stadium	**W** 5–2	**Bybee** (1–0)	Hanson (0-1)	Morris (1)	SEC Network+	8,785	15–2	—
March 17	Auburn	No. 7	Baum–Walker Stadium	**W** 7–2	**Hollan** (4–0)	Vail (2–1)	Smith (1)	SEC Network+	9,276	16–2	1–0
March 18	Auburn	No. 7	Baum–Walker Stadium	**W** 9–3	**McEntire** (4–0)	Crotchfelt (0-1)	Carter (2)	SEC Network+	9,359	17–2	2–0
March 19	Auburn	No. 7	Baum–Walker Stadium	**W** 5–0	**Adcock** (2–1)	Copeland (1–1)	None	SEC Network+	9,196	18–2	3–0
March 21	Southeast Missouri State	No. 5	Baum–Walker Stadium	**W** 12–2 (7)	**Bybee** (2–0)	Hernandez (0-1)	Morris (2)	SEC Network+	8,917	19–2	
March 24	at No. 1 LSU	No. 5	Alex Box Stadium; Baton Rouge, LA	**W** 9–3 (10)	**Smith** (4–0)	Shores (0-1)	None	SEC Network+	11,216	20–2	4–0
March 25	at No. 1 LSU	No. 5	Alex Box Stadium	**L** 2–12 (7)	Floyd (4–0)	**McEntire** (4–1)	None	SEC Network	11,857	20–3	4–1
March 25	at No. 1 LSU	No. 5	Alex Box Stadium	**L** 5–14	Herring (2–0)	**Morris (0–2)**	None	ESPN2	12,073	20–4	4–2
March 28	Omaha	No. 6	Baum–Walker Stadium	**W** 16–3 (7)	**Wood** (1–0)	Sellers (2–1)	None	SEC Network+	8,890	21–4	
March 31	Alabama	No. 6	Baum–Walker Stadium	**L** 1–12	Hess (4–0)	**Hollan** (4–1)	None	SEC Network+	10,032	21–5	4–3

April (12–6)
Date	Opponent	Rank	Site/stadium	Score	Win	Loss	Save	TV	Attendance	Overall record	SEC record
April 1	Alabama	No. 6	Baum–Walker Stadium	**W** 9–6	**Smith** (5–0)	Woods (2–1)	None	SEC Network+	10,713	22–5	5–3
April 2	Alabama	No. 6	Baum–Walker Stadium	**W** 5–4	**Carter** (4–0)	McMillan (0-1)	Wood (1)	SEC Network	10,006	23–5	6–3
April 4	Arkansas State	No. 5	Baum–Walker Stadium	Cancelled due to threat of inclement weather							
April 7	at Ole Miss	No. 5	Swayze Field; Oxford, MS	**W** 11–2	**Hollan** (5–1)	Dougherty (2–3)	None	SEC Network+	9,578	24–5	7–3
April 7	at Ole Miss	No. 5	Swayze Field	**L** 4–7	Rivas (5–2)	**Smith** (5–1)	Nichols (3)	SEC Network+	9,958	24–6	7–4
April 8	at Ole Miss	No. 5	Swayze Field	**W** 6–4	**Carter** (5–0)	Kimbrell (0-2)	Wood (2)	SEC Network	10,403	25–6	8–4
April 11	Little Rock	No. 5	Baum–Walker Stadium	**W** 21–5 (7)	**Adcock** (3–1)	Vaught (1–2)	None	SEC Network+	9,246	26–6	
April 12	Little Rock	No. 5	Baum–Walker Stadium	**L** 4–11	Weatherley (2–1)	**Ledbetter (0–1)**	None	SEC Network+	9,101	26–7	
April 14	No. 16 Tennessee	No. 5	Baum–Walker Stadium	**W** 5–2	**Hollan** (6–1)	Lindsey (0-2)	Smith (2)	SEC Network	11,043	27–7	9–4
April 15	No. 16 Tennessee	No. 5	Baum–Walker Stadium	**W** 6–3	**McEntire** (5–1)	Dollander (4–4)	Wood (3)	SEC Network+	11,076	28–7	10–4
April 16	No. 16 Tennessee	No. 5	Baum–Walker Stadium	**W** 7–2	**Carter** (6–0)	Beam (4–2)	None	SEC Network+	10,625	29–7	11–4
April 18	Central Arkansas	No. 5	Baum–Walker Stadium	**W** 6–3	**Foutch** (1–0)	Fenton (1–2)	Ledbetter (1)	SEC Network+	10,052	30–7	
April 20	at Georgia	No. 5	Foley Field; Athens, GA	**L** 5–6	K. Smith (2–1)	**Hollan** (6–2)	Rhadans (2)	SEC Network	2,934	30–8	11–5
April 21	at Georgia	No. 5	Foley Field	**L** 3–7	Goldstein (2–1)	**McEntire** (5–2)	None	SEC Network+	3,741	30–9	11–6
April 22	at Georgia	No. 5	Foley Field	**L** 8–9	Evans (1–0)	**Bybee** (2–1)	None	SEC Network+	3,688	30–10	11–7
April 25	at Missouri State	No. 7	Hammons Field; Springfield, MO	**L** 4–8	Ziegenbein (2–3)	**Morris (0–3)**	None	ESPN+	2,780	30–11	
April 27	Texas A&M	No. 7	Baum–Walker Stadium	**W** 7–5	**Smith** (6–1)	Garcia (1–1)	None	ESPNU	9,321	31–11	12–7
April 28	Texas A&M	No. 7	Baum–Walker Stadium	**W** 10–4	**McEntire** (6–2)	Aschenbeck (6–1)	Wood (4)	ESPNU	10,468	32–11	13–7
April 29	Texas A&M	No. 7	Baum–Walker Stadium	**W** 8–7	**Adcock** (4–1)	Johnston (3–2)	Coil (1)	SEC Network	10,013	33–11	14–7

May (6–4)
Date	Opponent	Rank	Site/stadium	Score	Win	Loss	Save	TV	Attendance	Overall record	SEC record
May 2	Lipscomb	No. 6	Dickey-Stephens Park; North Little Rock, AR	**L** 6–8 (11)	Frank (2–1)	**McGaughlin (0–1)**	None	None	9,346	33–12	
May 5	at Mississippi State	No. 6	Dudy Noble Field; Starkville, MS	**W** 6–2	**Smith** (7–1)	Smith (1–2)	Wood (5)	SEC Network+	10,871	34–12	15–7
May 6	at Mississippi State	No. 6	Dudy Noble Field	**W** 14–2 (7)	**Tygart** (2–0)	Gartman (2–3)	McEntire (1)	ESPNU	11,973	35–12	16–7
May 7	at Mississippi State	No. 6	Dudy Noble Field	**W** 11–6	**Morris (1–3)**	Cijinte (3–4)	None	SEC Network+	9,882	36–12	17–7
May 12	No. 6 South Carolina	No. 3	Baum–Walker Stadium	**W** 4–1	**Wood** (2–0)	Jones (4–3)	None	SEC Network+	10,218	37–12	18–7
May 13	No. 6 South Carolina	No. 3	Baum–Walker Stadium	**L** 1–3	Mahoney (5–2)	**McEntire** (6–3)	Veach (5)	SEC Network+	10,432	37–13	18–8
May 14	No. 6 South Carolina	No. 3	Baum–Walker Stadium	**W** 5–1	**Hollan** (7–2)		None	SEC Network+	9,981	38–13	19–8
May 18	at No. 12 Vanderbilt	No. 2	Hawkins Field; Nashville, TN	**W** 8–2	**Smith** (8–1)	**Reilly** (3–3)	McEntire (2)	SEC Network+	3,802	39–13	20–8
May 19	at No. 12 Vanderbilt	No. 2	Hawkins Field	**L** 8–10	Cunningham (2–2)	**Adcock** (4–2)	Maldonado (7)	SEC Network+	3,802	39–14	20–9
May 20	at No. 12 Vanderbilt	No. 2	Hawkins Field	**L** 6–7	Horn (3–0)	**Coil (0–1)**	Maldonado (8)	SEC Network+	3,802	39-15	20-10

Postseason (4–3)

SEC Tournament (2–1)
Date	Opponent	Seed/rank	Site/stadium	Score	Win	Loss	Save	TV	Attendance	Overall record	SECT record
May 24	(10) Texas A&M	(2) No. 4	Hoover Metropolitan Stadium; Hoover, AL	**W** 6–5 (11)	**McEntire** (7–3)	Sexton (1–3)	None	SECN	7,825	40–15	1–0
May 25	(3) No. 5 LSU	(2) No. 4	Hoover Metropolitan Stadium	**W** 5–4	**Hollan** (8–2)	Skenes (10–2)	None	SECN	12,875	41–15	2–0
May 27	(10) Texas A&M	(2) No. 4	Hoover Metropolitan Stadium	**L** 4–5	Sdao (3–1)	**Tygart** (2–1)	Wansing (1)	SECN	n/a	41–16	2–1

Fayetteville Regional (2–2)
Date	Opponent	Seed/rank	Site/stadium	Score	Win	Loss	Save	Attendance	Overall record	NCAAT record
June 2	vs. (4) Santa Clara	(1) No. 5	Baum–Walker Stadium	**W** 13–6	**McEntire** (8–3)	Hales (6–5)	None	11,078	42–16	1–0
June 4	vs. (2) No. 17 TCU	(1) No. 5	Baum–Walker Stadium	**L** 5–20	Stoutenborough (4–0)	**Smith** (8–2)	None	11,121	42–17	1–1
June 2	vs. (4) Santa Clara	(1) No. 5	Baum–Walker Stadium	**W** 6–4	**Tygart** (3–1)	Gomez (6–4)	**Hollan** (1)	10,395	43–17	2–1
June 4	vs. (2) No. 17 TCU	(1) No. 5	Baum–Walker Stadium	**L** 4–12	Abeldt (3–3)	**Morris** (1–4)	None	10,475	43–18	2–2

*Denotes non–conference game • Schedule source • Rankings based on the teams' current ranking in the D1Baseball poll
**W** Arkansas win • **L** Arkansas loss • Postponement or cancellation • **Bold** denotes Arkansas player

== Record vs. conference opponents ==
Last two do not qualify for conf. tourn. Blank are not scheduled. Blue are home games, otherwise away.

2023 SEC baseball records Source: 2023 SEC baseball game results, 2023 SEC baseball schedule
Team	W–L	ALA	ARK	AUB	FLA	UGA	KEN	LSU	MSU	MIZZ	MISS	SCAR	TENN	TAMU	VAN	Team	Div	SR	SW
ALA	16–14		1–2	2–1	1–2	.	1–2	0–3	1–2	3–0	3–0	.	.	2–1	2–1	ALA	W4	5–5	2–1
ARK	20–10	2–1		3–0	.	0–3	.	1–2	3–0	.	2–1	2–1	3–0	3–0	1–2	ARK	W1	7–3	4–1
AUB	17–13	1–2	0–3		1–2	2–1	.	2–1	2–1	3–0	3–0	2–1	.	1–2	.	AUB	W3	6–4	2–1
FLA	20–10	2–1	.	2–1		2–1	2–1	.	.	3–0	3–0	0–3	2–1	1–2	3–0	FLA	E1	8–2	3–1
UGA	11–19	.	3–0	1–2	1–2		2–1	1–2	.	0–3	1–2	0–3	2–1	.	0–3	UGA	E6	3–7	1–3
KEN	16–14	2–1	.	.	1–2	1–2		1–2	3–0	3–0	.	3–0	1–2	1–2	0–3	KEN	E5	4–6	3–1
LSU	19–10	3–0	2–1	1–2	.	2–1	2–1		1–2	.	3–0	1–1	2–1	2–1	.	LSU	W2	7–2	2–0
MSU	9–21	2–1	0–3	1–2	.	.	0–3	2–1		.	2–1	1–2	0–3	1–2	0–3	MSU	W6	3–7	0–4
MIZZ	10–20	0–3	.	0–3	0–3	3–0	0–3	.	.		2–1	0–3	3–0	1–2	1–2	MIZZ	E7	3–7	2–5
MISS	6–24	0–3	1–2	0–3	0–3	2–1	.	0–3	1–2	1–2		.	.	1–2	0–3	MISS	W7	1–9	0–5
SCAR	16–13	.	1–2	1–2	3–0	3–0	0–3	1–1	2–1	3–0	.		1–2	.	1–2	SCAR	E3	4–5	3–1
TENN	16–14	.	0–3	.	1–2	1–2	2–1	1–2	3–0	0–3	.	2–1		3–0	3–0	TENN	E4	5–5	3–2
TAMU	14–16	1–2	0–3	2–1	2–1	.	2–1	1–2	2–1	2–1	2–1	.	0–3		.	TAMU	W5	6–4	0–2
VAN	19–11	1–2	2–1	.	0–3	3–0	3–0	.	3–0	2–1	3–0	2–1	0–3	.		VAN	E2	7–3	4–2
Team	W–L	ALA	ARK	AUB	FLA	UGA	KEN	LSU	MSU	MIZZ	MISS	SCAR	TENN	TAMU	VAN	Team	Div	SR	SW

Updated for entire regular season. Tiebrkrs: FLA>ARK VAN common. KEN&TENN>ALA LSU common. TENN>KEN hd–hd.
