= 2023 Auburn Tigers baseball team =

American college baseball season

2023 Auburn Tigers baseball

Auburn Regional, 0-2
- Conference: Southeastern Conference
- Western Division
- Record: 34–23–1 (17–13 SEC)
- Head coach: Butch Thompson (8th season)
- Assistant coaches: Gabe Gross; Karl Nonemaker
- Home stadium: Plainsman Park

2023 Southeastern Conference baseball standings
| | Conf. | | | | | | Overall |
| Team | W | | L | | T | PCT | W | | L | | T | PCT |
|---|---|---|---|---|---|---|---|---|---|---|---|---|
Eastern
| No. 2 Florida ^{x}‍†‍‍^{y} | 20 | – | 10 | – | 0 | .667 | 54 | – | 17 | – | 0 | .761 |
| No. 19 Vanderbilt ‍‍‡‍^{y} | 19 | – | 11 | – | 0 | .633 | 42 | – | 20 | – | 0 | .677 |
| No. 13 South Carolina ‍‍‍^{y} | 16 | – | 13 | – | 0 | .552 | 42 | – | 21 | – | 0 | .667 |
| No. 7 Tennessee ‍‍‍^{y} | 16 | – | 14 | – | 0 | .533 | 44 | – | 22 | – | 0 | .667 |
| No. 17 Kentucky ‍‍‍^{y} | 16 | – | 14 | – | 0 | .533 | 40 | – | 21 | – | 0 | .656 |
| Georgia ‍‍‍ | 11 | – | 19 | – | 0 | .367 | 29 | – | 27 | – | 0 | .518 |
| Missouri ‍‍‍ | 10 | – | 20 | – | 0 | .333 | 30 | – | 24 | – | 0 | .556 |
Western
| No. 16 Arkansas ^{x}‍†‍‍^{y} | 20 | – | 10 | – | 0 | .667 | 43 | – | 18 | – | 0 | .705 |
| No. 1 LSU ‍‍‍^{y} | 19 | – | 10 | – | 0 | .655 | 54 | – | 17 | – | 0 | .761 |
| Auburn ‍‍‍^{y} | 17 | – | 13 | – | 0 | .567 | 34 | – | 23 | – | 1 | .595 |
| No. 10 Alabama ‍‍‍^{y} | 16 | – | 14 | – | 0 | .533 | 43 | – | 21 | – | 0 | .672 |
| Texas A&M ‍‍‍^{y} | 14 | – | 16 | – | 0 | .467 | 38 | – | 27 | – | 0 | .585 |
| Mississippi State ‍‍‍ | 9 | – | 21 | – | 0 | .300 | 27 | – | 26 | – | 0 | .509 |
| Ole Miss ‍‍‍ | 6 | – | 24 | – | 0 | .200 | 25 | – | 29 | – | 0 | .463 |
x – Division champion † – Conference champion ‡ – Tournament champion y – Invited to the NCAA tournament As of June 26, 2023; Rankings from D1Baseball

The 2023 Auburn Tigers baseball team represented Auburn University in the 2023 NCAA Division I baseball season. The Tigers played their home games at Plainsman Park.

The Tigers finished 34–23–1, 17–13 in the SEC to finish in third place in the West division. The team played in the SEC Tournament, beating Missouri, but then lost to No. 6 Vanderbilt and then No. 16 Alabama. They then hosted their games in the NCAA Tournament, where they lost to Penn and Southern Miss.

== Previous season ==
In 2022, the Tigers finished 43–22, finishing 4th in the SEC West division. They would become the Auburn Regional champions, and then the Corvallis Super Regional champions in the NCAA Tournament. The team would go on to participate in the College World Series, where they would beat Stanford, but lose to Ole Miss and Arkansas.

== Schedule and results ==
2023 Auburn Tigers baseball game log
Regular season

February
| Date | Opponent | Rank | Site/stadium | Score | Win | Loss | Save | TV | Attendance | Overall record | SEC record |
|---|---|---|---|---|---|---|---|---|---|---|---|
| February 17 | Indiana | 17 | Plainsman Park | **W** 8-4 | Bauman (1-0) | Seiler (0-1) | None | | 3,816 | 1-0 | 0-0 |
| February 18 | Indiana | 17 | Plainsman Park | **W** 6-1 | Gonzalez (1-0) | Bothwell (0-1) | None | | 4,096 | 2-0 | 0-0 |
| February 19 | Indiana | 17 | Plainsman Park | **L** 2-11 | Sinnard (1-0) | Nelson (0-1) | None | | 3,847 | 2-1 | 0-0 |
| February 21 | at North Alabama | 17 | Toyota Field; Madison, AL | **W** 13-1 | Copeland (1-0) | Brown (0-1) | None | | 5,448 | 3-1 | 0-0 |
| February 24 | USC | 17 | Plainsman Park | **W** 5-3 | Armstrong (1-0) | Stromsborg (0-1) | Cannon (1) | | 2,809 | 4-1 | 0-0 |
| February 25 | USC | 17 | Plainsman Park | **W** 12-6 | Armstrong (2-0) | Johnson (0-1) | Cannon (2) | | 3,319 | 5-1 | 0-0 |
| February 26 | USC | 17 | Plainsman Park | **T** 12-12 | None | None | None | | 2,813 | 5-1-1 | 0-0 |

March
| Date | Opponent | Rank | Site/stadium | Score | Win | Loss | Save | TV | Attendance | Overall record | SEC record |
|---|---|---|---|---|---|---|---|---|---|---|---|
| March 1 | Florida A&M | 13 | Plainsman Park | **W** 18-8 | Vail (1-0) | Tease (0-1) | None | | 2,852 | 6-1-1 | 0-0 |
| March 3 | Lipscomb | 13 | Plainsman Park | **W** 7-3 | Armstrong (3-0) | Dunkleberger (0-2) | Allsup (1) | | 3,098 | 7-1-1 | 0-0 |
| March 4 | Lipscomb | 13 | Plainsman Park | **W** 12-11 | Cannon (1-0) | Kantola (0-3) | None | | 4,096 | 8-1-1 | 0-0 |
| March 5 | Lipscomb | 13 | Plainsman Park | **W** 4-3 | Armstrong (4-0) | Thompson (2-1) | None | | 2,933 | 9-1-1 | 0-0 |
| March 7 | UAB | 11 | Plainsman Park | **W** 4-1 | Vail (2-0) | Haines (0-2) | Allsup (2) | | 2,920 | 10-1-1 | 0-0 |
| March 8 | at Jacksonville State | 11 | Rudy Abbott Field; Jacksonville, AL | **W** 6-3 | Isbell (1-0) | Sibley (0-1) | Cannon (3) | | 1,988 | 11-1-1 | 0-0 |
| March 10 | Southeastern Louisiana | 11 | Plainsman Park | **W** 7-1 | Carlson (1-0) | Stuprich (1-2) | Armstrong (1) | | 3,072 | 12-1-1 | 0-0 |
| March 11 (DH) | Southeastern Louisiana | 11 | Plainsman Park | **L** 3-8 | Lauve (2-0) | Isbell (1-1) | Rodriguez (1) | | 4,096 | 12-2-1 | 0-0 |
| March 11 (DH) | Southeastern Louisiana | 11 | Plainsman Park | **L** 7-8 | Landry (2-1) | Herberholz (0-1) | Lauve (1) | | 2,875 | 12-3-1 | 0-0 |
| March 14 | Georgia Tech | 18 | Plainsman Park | **W** 12-11 (12) | Isbell (2-1) | Carwile (1-1) | None | | 3,624 | 13-3-1 | 0-0 |
| March 17 | at No. 3 Arkansas | 18 | Baum-Walker Stadium; Fayetteville, AR | **L** 2-7 | Hollan (4-0) | Vail (2-1) | Smith (1) | | 9,276 | 13-4-1 | 0-1 |
| March 18 | at No. 3 Arkansas | 18 | Baum-Walker Stadium | **L** 3-9 | McEntire (4-0) | Crotchfelt (0-1) | Carter (2) | | 9,353 | 13-5-1 | 0-2 |
| March 19 | at No. 3 Arkansas | 18 | Baum-Walker Stadium | **L** 0-5 | Adcock (2-1) | Copeland (1-1) | None | | 9,196 | 13-6-1 | 0-3 |
| March 21 | South Alabama | | Riverwalk Stadium; Montgomery, AL | **W** 6-5 | Nelson (1-1) | Knowlton (1-1) | Isbell (1) | | 1,532 | 14-6-1 | 0-3 |
| March 23 | Georgia | | Plainsman Park | **W** 7-6 (11) | Cannon (2-0) | Greenler (1-1) | None | | 4,096 | 15-6-1 | 1-3 |
| March 24 | Georgia | | Plainsman Park | **W** 6-3 | Armstrong (5-0) | Woods (3-1) | Isbell (2) | | 4,096 | 16-6-1 | 2-3 |
| March 25 | Georgia | | Plainsman Park | **L** 7-24 | Caldwell (1-0) | Crotchfelt (0-2) | Crisp (1) | | 4,096 | 16-7-1 | 2-4 |
| March 28 | North Alabama | | Plainsman Park | **W** 14-1 (7) | Nelson (2-1) | Brown (0-3) | None | | 3,460 | 17-7-1 | 2-4 |
| March 31 | at No. 2 Florida | | Condron Ballpark; Gainesville, FL | **W** 10-1 | Bauman (2-0) | Sproat (4-1) | None | | 6,828 | 18-7-1 | 3-4 |

April
| Date | Opponent | Rank | Site/stadium | Score | Win | Loss | Save | TV | Attendance | Overall record | SEC record |
|---|---|---|---|---|---|---|---|---|---|---|---|
| April 1 | at No. 2 Florida | | Condron Ballpark | **L** 5-12 | Waldrep (5-1) | Armstrong (5-1) | Neely (6) | | 7,354 | 18-8-1 | 3-5 |
| April 2 | at No. 2 Florida | | Condron Ballpark | **L** 8-17 | Slater (4-0) | Nelson (2-2) | None | | 5,793 | 18-9-1 | 3-6 |
| April 4 | at UAB | | Regions Field; Birmingham, AL | **L** 5-6 | Clack (1-0) | Herberholz (0-2) | None | | 4,051 | 18-10-1 | 3-6 |
| April 6 | Texas A&M | | Plainsman Park | **L** 5-9 | Aschenbeck (4-0) | Bauman (2-1) | None | | 4,096 | 18-11-1 | 3-7 |
| April 7 (DH) | Texas A&M | | Plainsman Park | **W** 10-9 | Armstrong (6-1) | Sexton (1-1) | Carlson (1) | | 4,096 | 19-11-1 | 4-7 |
| April 7 (DH) | Texas A&M | | Plainsman Park | **L** 6-12 | Rudis (4-0) | Sheehan (0-1) | None | | 4,096 | 19-12-1 | 4-8 |
| April 11 | at Georgia Tech | | Russ Chandler Stadium; Atlanta, GA | **L** 8-12 (10) | Smith (2-0) | Cannon (2-1) | None | | 1,958 | 19-13-1 | 4-8 |
| April 14 | at Alabama | | Sewell-Thomas Stadium; Tuscaloosa, AL | **W** 8-4 | Vail (3-1) | Holman (5-2) | None | | 5,800 | 20-13-1 | 5-8 |
| April 15 | at Alabama | | Sewell-Thomas Stadium | **L** 2-4 | McMillan (1-1) | Nelson (2-3) | Davis II (2) | | 5,800 | 20-14-1 | 5-9 |
| April 16 | at Alabama | | Sewell-Thomas Stadium | **L** 1-6 | Quick (1-1) | Herberholz (0-3) | Davis II (3) | | 5,800 | 20-15-1 | 5-10 |
| April 18 | Samford | | Plainsman Park | **W** 13-3 (8) | Murphy (1-0) | Newman (2-2) | Armstrong (2) | | 3,212 | 21-15-1 | 5-10 |
| April 21 | Mississippi State | | Plainsman Park | **W** 2-1 | Bauman (3-1) | Dohm (5-4) | Cannon (4) | | 4,096 | 22-15-1 | 6-10 |
| April 22 | Mississippi State | | Plainsman Park | **L** 10-11 | Hunt (1-1) | Armstrong (6-2) | Nixon (1) | | 4,096 | 22-16-1 | 6-11 |
| April 23 | Mississippi State | | Plainsman Park | **W** 12-11 | Copeland (2-1) | Nixon (1-1) | None | | 4,096 | 23-16-1 | 7-11 |
| April 25 | Troy | | Plainsman Park | **L** 7-8 | Manning (2-2) | Carlson (1-1) | Fruit (2) | | 3,378 | 23-17-1 | 7-11 |
| April 28 | at No. 2 South Carolina | | Founders Park; Columbua, SC | **W** 8-3 | Vail (4-1) | Sanders (4-2) | None | | 8,242 | 24-17-1 | 8-11 |
| April 29 | at No. 2 South Carolina | | Founders Park | **W** 9-5 | Copeland (3-1) | Mahoney (4-2) | None | | 8,242 | 25-17-1 | 9-11 |
| April 30 | at No. 2 South Carolina | | Founders Park | **L** 7-8 | Veach (2-0) | Horne (0-1) | Proctor (1) | | 7,254 | 25-18-1 | 9-12 |

May
| Date | Opponent | Rank | Site/stadium | Score | Win | Loss | Save | TV | Attendance | Overall record | SEC record |
|---|---|---|---|---|---|---|---|---|---|---|---|
| May 5 | No. 1 LSU | | Plainsman Park | **L** 0-3 | Skenes (9-1) | Allsup (0-1) | Hurd (2) | | 4,096 | 25-19-1 | 9-13 |
| May 6 | No. 1 LSU | | Plainsman Park | **W** 8-6 | Crotchfelt (1-2) | Coleman (1-1) | Cannon (5) | | 4,096 | 26-19-1 | 10-13 |
| May 7 | No. 1 LSU | | Plainsman Park | **W** 12-2 (8) | Herberholz (1-3) | Little (2-2) | Nelson (1) | | 4,096 | 27-19-1 | 11-13 |
| May 9 | Samford | | Hoover Metropolitan Stadium; Hoover, AL | Canceled | | | | | | | |
| May 12 (DH) | at Ole Miss | 23 | Swayze Field; Oxford, MS | **W** 16-4 (8) | Bauman (4-1) | Rivas (5-4) | None | | 9,280 | 28-19-1 | 12-13 |
| May 12 (DH) | at Ole Miss | 23 | Swayze Field | **W** 8-2 | Vail (5-1) | Quinn (3-3) | None | | 9,357 | 29-19-1 | 13-13 |
| May 13 | at Ole Miss | 23 | Swayze Field | **W** 13-5 | Nelson (3-3) | Saunier (2-4) | None | | 9,726 | 30-19-1 | 14-13 |
| May 16 | Jacksonville State | | Plainsman Park | Canceled | | | | | | | |
| May 19 (DH) | Missouri | 19 | Plainsman Park | **W** 4-0 | Allsup (1-1) | Murphy (4-5) | Bauman (1) | | 4,096 | 31-19-1 | 15-13 |
| May 19 (DH) | Missouri | 19 | Plainsman Park | **W** 7-2 | Copeland (4-1) | Pimental (1-1) | None | | 4,096 | 32-19-1 | 16-13 |
| May 20 | Missouri | 19 | Plainsman Park | **W** 9-7 | Cannon (3-1) | Hasty (0-1) | None | | 4,096 | 33-19-1 | 17-13 |

Postseason

SEC Tournament
| Date | Opponent | Seed | Site/stadium | Score | Win | Loss | Save | TV | Attendance | Overall record | SECT Record |
|---|---|---|---|---|---|---|---|---|---|---|---|
| May 23 | Missouri | 13 (5) | Hoover Metropolitan Stadium | **W** 10-4 | Isbell (3-1) | Lucas (3-1) | Crotchfelt (1) | | 10,315 | 34-19-1 | 1-0 |
| May 24 | No. 6 Vanderbilt | 13 (5) | Hoover Metropolitan Stadium | **L** 4-6 | Reilly (4-3) | Allsup (1-2) | None | | 12,685 | 34-20-1 | 1-1 |
| May 25 | No. 16 Alabama | 13 (5) | Hoover Metropolitan Stadium | **L** 4-7 | McMillan (4-2) | Copeland (4-2) | Hoopes (1) | | 8,120 | 34-21-1 | 1-2 |

NCAA tournament – Auburn Regional
| Date | Opponent | Seed | Site/stadium | Score | Win | Loss | Save | TV | Attendance | Overall record | NCAAT Record |
|---|---|---|---|---|---|---|---|---|---|---|---|
| June 2 | Penn | (13) | Plainsman Park | **L** 3-6 | Ozmer (2-2) | Cannon (3-2) | None | | 4,096 | 34-22-1 | 0-1 |
| June 3 | Southern Miss | (13) | Plainsman Park | **L** 2-7 | Oldham (7-3) | Vail (5-2) | Armistead (1) | | 4,096 | 34-23-1 | 0-2 |

Legend: = Win = Loss = Canceled
Bold = Auburn team member
Rankings are based on the team's current ranking in the D1Baseball poll.

== Record vs. conference opponents ==
Last two do not qualify for conf. tourn. Blank are not scheduled. Blue are home games, otherwise away.

2023 SEC baseball records Source: 2023 SEC baseball game results, 2023 SEC baseball schedule
| Team | W–L | ALA | ARK | AUB | FLA | UGA | KEN | LSU | MSU | MIZZ | MISS | SCAR | TENN | TAMU | VAN | Team | Div | SR | SW |
|---|---|---|---|---|---|---|---|---|---|---|---|---|---|---|---|---|---|---|---|
| ALA | 16–14 | | 1–2 | 2–1 | 1–2 | . | 1–2 | 0–3 | 1–2 | 3–0 | 3–0 | . | . | 2–1 | 2–1 | ALA | W4 | 5–5 | 2–1 |
| ARK | 20–10 | 2–1 | | 3–0 | . | 0–3 | . | 1–2 | 3–0 | . | 2–1 | 2–1 | 3–0 | 3–0 | 1–2 | ARK | W1 | 7–3 | 4–1 |
| AUB | 17–13 | 1–2 | 0–3 | | 1–2 | 2–1 | . | 2–1 | 2–1 | 3–0 | 3–0 | 2–1 | . | 1–2 | . | AUB | W3 | 6–4 | 2–1 |
| FLA | 20–10 | 2–1 | . | 2–1 | | 2–1 | 2–1 | . | . | 3–0 | 3–0 | 0–3 | 2–1 | 1–2 | 3–0 | FLA | E1 | 8–2 | 3–1 |
| UGA | 11–19 | . | 3–0 | 1–2 | 1–2 | | 2–1 | 1–2 | . | 0–3 | 1–2 | 0–3 | 2–1 | . | 0–3 | UGA | E6 | 3–7 | 1–3 |
| KEN | 16–14 | 2–1 | . | . | 1–2 | 1–2 | | 1–2 | 3–0 | 3–0 | . | 3–0 | 1–2 | 1–2 | 0–3 | KEN | E5 | 4–6 | 3–1 |
| LSU | 19–10 | 3–0 | 2–1 | 1–2 | . | 2–1 | 2–1 | | 1–2 | . | 3–0 | 1–1 | 2–1 | 2–1 | . | LSU | W2 | 7–2 | 2–0 |
| MSU | 9–21 | 2–1 | 0–3 | 1–2 | . | . | 0–3 | 2–1 | | . | 2–1 | 1–2 | 0–3 | 1–2 | 0–3 | MSU | W6 | 3–7 | 0–4 |
| MIZZ | 10–20 | 0–3 | . | 0–3 | 0–3 | 3–0 | 0–3 | . | . | | 2–1 | 0–3 | 3–0 | 1–2 | 1–2 | MIZZ | E7 | 3–7 | 2–5 |
| MISS | 6–24 | 0–3 | 1–2 | 0–3 | 0–3 | 2–1 | . | 0–3 | 1–2 | 1–2 | | . | . | 1–2 | 0–3 | MISS | W7 | 1–9 | 0–5 |
| SCAR | 16–13 | . | 1–2 | 1–2 | 3–0 | 3–0 | 0–3 | 1–1 | 2–1 | 3–0 | . | | 1–2 | . | 1–2 | SCAR | E3 | 4–5 | 3–1 |
| TENN | 16–14 | . | 0–3 | . | 1–2 | 1–2 | 2–1 | 1–2 | 3–0 | 0–3 | . | 2–1 | | 3–0 | 3–0 | TENN | E4 | 5–5 | 3–2 |
| TAMU | 14–16 | 1–2 | 0–3 | 2–1 | 2–1 | . | 2–1 | 1–2 | 2–1 | 2–1 | 2–1 | . | 0–3 | | . | TAMU | W5 | 6–4 | 0–2 |
| VAN | 19–11 | 1–2 | 2–1 | . | 0–3 | 3–0 | 3–0 | . | 3–0 | 2–1 | 3–0 | 2–1 | 0–3 | . | | VAN | E2 | 7–3 | 4–2 |
| Team | W–L | ALA | ARK | AUB | FLA | UGA | KEN | LSU | MSU | MIZZ | MISS | SCAR | TENN | TAMU | VAN | Team | Div | SR | SW |

Updated for entire regular season. Tiebrkrs: FLA>ARK VAN common. KEN&TENN>ALA LSU common. TENN>KEN hd–hd.

== See also ==
- 2023 Auburn Tigers softball team
