= 2023 South Carolina Gamecocks baseball team =

American college baseball season

2023 South Carolina Gamecocks baseball

Columbia Regional champions

Gainesville Super Regional, 0–2
- Conference: Southeastern Conference
- Eastern Division

Ranking
- Coaches: No. 10
- CB: No. 14
- Record: 42–21 (16–13 SEC)
- Head coach: Mark Kingston (6th season)
- Assistant coaches: Monte Lee (1st season); Scott Wingo (2nd season)
- Pitching coach: Justin Parker (2nd season)
- Home stadium: Founders Park

Uniform
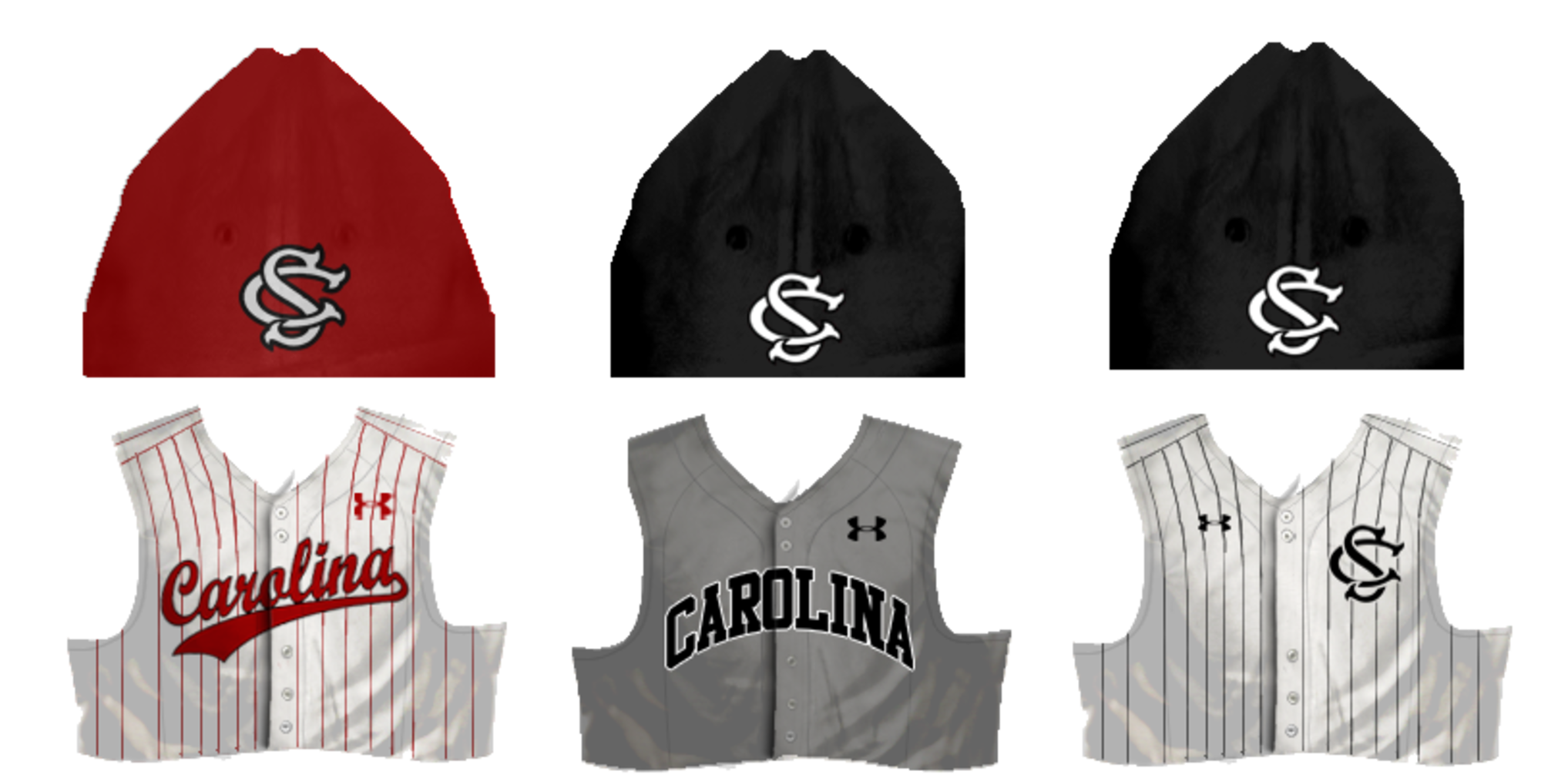

2023 Southeastern Conference baseball standings
	Conf.						Overall
Team	W		L		T	PCT	W		L		T	PCT
Eastern
No. 2 Florida ^{x}‍†‍‍^{y}	20	–	10	–	0	.667	54	–	17	–	0	.761
No. 19 Vanderbilt ‍‍‡‍^{y}	19	–	11	–	0	.633	42	–	20	–	0	.677
No. 13 South Carolina ‍‍‍^{y}	16	–	13	–	0	.552	42	–	21	–	0	.667
No. 7 Tennessee ‍‍‍^{y}	16	–	14	–	0	.533	44	–	22	–	0	.667
No. 17 Kentucky ‍‍‍^{y}	16	–	14	–	0	.533	40	–	21	–	0	.656
Georgia ‍‍‍	11	–	19	–	0	.367	29	–	27	–	0	.518
Missouri ‍‍‍	10	–	20	–	0	.333	30	–	24	–	0	.556
Western
No. 16 Arkansas ^{x}‍†‍‍^{y}	20	–	10	–	0	.667	43	–	18	–	0	.705
No. 1 LSU ‍‍‍^{y}	19	–	10	–	0	.655	54	–	17	–	0	.761
Auburn ‍‍‍^{y}	17	–	13	–	0	.567	34	–	23	–	1	.595
No. 10 Alabama ‍‍‍^{y}	16	–	14	–	0	.533	43	–	21	–	0	.672
Texas A&M ‍‍‍^{y}	14	–	16	–	0	.467	38	–	27	–	0	.585
Mississippi State ‍‍‍	9	–	21	–	0	.300	27	–	26	–	0	.509
Ole Miss ‍‍‍	6	–	24	–	0	.200	25	–	29	–	0	.463
x – Division champion † – Conference champion ‡ – Tournament champion y – Invited to the NCAA tournament As of June 26, 2023; Rankings from D1Baseball

The 2023 South Carolina Gamecocks baseball team represented the University of South Carolina in the 2023 NCAA Division I baseball season. The 2023 season marked the Gamecocks' 130th overall. The Gamecocks played their home games at Founders Park, and were led by sixth year head coach Mark Kingston. The Gamecocks were eliminated 0-2 from the Gainesville Super Regional, and finished the season ranked 13th in the final D1Baseball rankings.

== Previous season ==
The Gamecocks finished 27–28, 13–17 in the SEC

== Personnel ==
=== Roster ===
2023 South Carolina Gamecocks baseball team
Players
Coaches

#	Pos.	Name	B/T	Height	Weight	Year	Home town
2	RHP	Roman Kimball	R/R	5 ft 11 in (1.8 m)	185 lb (84 kg)	So	New Hartford, NY
3	INF	Braylen Wimmer	R/R	6 ft 4 in (1.93 m)	200 lb (91 kg)	Sr	Yukon, OK
4	LHP	Jackson Phipps	L/L	6 ft 4 in (1.93 m)	225 lb (102 kg)	So	Dallas, GA
5	C	Talmadge LeCroy	R/R	6 ft 2 in (1.88 m)	205 lb (93 kg)	So	Belton, SC
6	INF	Will McGillis	R/R	6 ft 3 in (1.91 m)	200 lb (91 kg)	Gr	San Diego, CA
7	INF	Michael Braswell	R/R	6 ft 2 in (1.88 m)	195 lb (88 kg)	So	Mableton, GA
9	OF	Evan Stone	R/R	6 ft 0 in (1.83 m)	185 lb (84 kg)	Fr	Irmo, SC
10	OF	Dylan Brewer	L/L	6 ft 2 in (1.88 m)	180 lb (82 kg)	Sr	Latta, SC
11	OF	Caleb Denny	L/R	6 ft 2 in (1.88 m)	195 lb (88 kg)	Jr	Owasso, OK
12	INF	Jacob Compton	L/L	6 ft 1 in (1.85 m)	225 lb (102 kg)	Jr	Olive Branch, MS
13	INF	Will Tippet	S/R	6 ft 1 in (1.85 m)	175 lb (79 kg)	Fr	Stone Mountain, GA
14	RHP	Eli Jones	R/R	6 ft 1 in (1.85 m)	200 lb (91 kg)	So	Peachtree City, GA
15	INF	Carson Hornung	L/R	6 ft 3 in (1.91 m)	225 lb (102 kg)	So	Overland Park, KS
16	RHP	Dylan Eskew	R/R	6 ft 3 in (1.91 m)	200 lb (91 kg)	So	Tampa, FL
18	RHP	Eli Jerzembeck	R/R	6 ft 2 in (1.88 m)	185 lb (84 kg)	Fr	Charlotte, NC
19	C	Cole Messina	R/R	6 ft 0 in (1.83 m)	230 lb (104 kg)	So	Summerville, SC
20	INF	Ethan Petry	L/R	6 ft 4 in (1.93 m)	230 lb (104 kg)	Fr	Land o' Lakes, FL
22	RHP	Ricky Williams	R/R	6 ft 2 in (1.88 m)	200 lb (91 kg)	Jr	Lexington, SC
23	RHP	Jack Mahoney	R/R	6 ft 3 in (1.91 m)	205 lb (93 kg)	Jr	Arlington Heights, IL
25	RHP	Sam Simpson	R/R	6 ft 3 in (1.91 m)	180 lb (82 kg)	Fr	Carrollton, GA
26	C	Jonathan French	R/R	5 ft 11 in (1.8 m)	235 lb (107 kg)	Sr	Lilburn, GA
28	RHP	Austin Williamson	R/R	6 ft 4 in (1.93 m)	220 lb (100 kg)	Fr	Sherrills Ford, NC
29	LHP	Matthew Becker	R/L	6 ft 3 in (1.91 m)	200 lb (91 kg)	So	Chapin, SC
30	RHP	Brett Thomas	R/R	6 ft 5 in (1.96 m)	240 lb (109 kg)	Sr	Atlanta, GA
31	OF	David Cromer	R/R	6 ft 2 in (1.88 m)	225 lb (102 kg)	So	Lexington, SC
32	RHP	Will Sanders	R/R	6 ft 6 in (1.98 m)	230 lb (104 kg)	Jr	Atlanta, GA
33	RHP	Noah Hall	R/R	6 ft 0 in (1.83 m)	195 lb (88 kg)	Sr	Charlotte, NC
34	RHP	James Hicks	R/R	6 ft 2 in (1.88 m)	190 lb (86 kg)	Jr	Conway, AR
35	OF	Connor Fuhrman	R/R	6 ft 0 in (1.83 m)	200 lb (91 kg)	Fr	Daleville, VA
36	RHP	Cade Austin	R/R	6 ft 3 in (1.91 m)	230 lb (104 kg)	So	Chapin, SC
37	RHP	Chris Veach	R/R	6 ft 0 in (1.83 m)	195 lb (88 kg)	So	Chapin, SC
38	C	Zander Buchan	R/R	5 ft 11 in (1.8 m)	195 lb (88 kg)	Fr	Columbia, SC
40	RHP	Wesley Sweatt	R/R	6 ft 3 in (1.91 m)	215 lb (98 kg)	Gr	Rock Hill, SC
41	RHP	Zach Zedalis	R/R	5 ft 11 in (1.8 m)	190 lb (86 kg)	Jr	Charlotte, NC
44	LHP	Trey Wheeler	L/L	6 ft 0 in (1.83 m)	185 lb (84 kg)	Fr	Indialantic, FL
47	RHP	Connor McCreery	R/R	6 ft 6 in (1.98 m)	215 lb (98 kg)	Fr	Williston Park, NY
50	INF	Kevin Madden	R/R	6 ft 1 in (1.85 m)	200 lb (91 kg)	Sr	Glenwood, MD
52	INF	Gavin Casas	L/R	6 ft 4 in (1.93 m)	230 lb (104 kg)	Jr	Pembroke Pines, FL

Head coach

Mark Kingston

Assistant coach(es)

Monte Lee
Scott Wingo
Justin Parker

Legend

- (C) Team captain
- (S) Suspended
- (I) Ineligible
- Injured
- Current redshirt

Roster

=== Coaching staff ===
2023 South Carolina Gamecocks baseball coaching staff
- Mark Kingston – Head coach – 5th year
- Monte Lee – Assistant coach – 1st year
- Scott Wingo – Assistant coach – 2nd year
- Justin Parker – Pitching Coach – 2nd year
- Mike Current – Player Development – 6th year
- Ryan West – Director of Operations – 1st year
- Alek Boychuck – Student assistant coach – 3rd year

=== Opening Day lineup ===
Opening Day Starters
Name	Position
Carson Hornung	Designated hitter
Braylen Wimmer	Shortstop
Caleb Denny	Left field
Cole Messina	Catcher
Talmadge LeCroy	Third base
Gavin Casas	First base
Will McGillis	Second base
Dylan Brewer	Right field
Evan Stone	Center field

== Schedule and results ==
2023 South Carolina Gamecocks baseball game log
Regular season (19–1)

February (9–0)
Date	Opponent	Rank	Site/stadium	Score	Win	Loss	Save	TV	Attendance	Overall record	SEC record
February 17	UMass Lowell	#23	Founders Park; Columbia, SC	20–3	Hicks (1–0)	Keevan (0–1)	None	SECN+	7,215	1–0	
February 18	UMass Lowell	#23	Founders Park	17–1	Hall (1–0)	Foley (0–1)	None	SECN+	7,323	2–0	
February 19	UMass Lowell	#23	Founders Park	12–1	Mahoney (1–0)	Draper (0–1)	None	SECN+	6,372	3–0	
February 21	Winthrop	#23	Founders Park	19–3	Jones (1–0)	Hopkins (0–1)	None	SECN+	6,014	4–0	
February 22	Queens	#23	Founders Park	12–0	Hicks (2–0)	Maidhof (0–1)	None	SECN+	5,944	5–0	
February 24	Penn	#23	Founders Park	7–4	Sanders (1–0)	Coady (0–1)	**Veach (1)**	SECN+	7,105	6–0	
February 25	Penn	#23	Founders Park	1–0	Hall (2–0)	Zaffiro (0–1)	**Becker (1)**	SECN+	7,057	7–0	
February 26	Penn	#23	Founders Park	6–5	Austin (1–0)	Ozmer (0–1)	**Veach (2)**	SECN+	6442	8–0	
February 28	NC A&T	#23	Founders Park	11–3	Jones (2–0)	Killpatrick (0–2)	None	SECN+	5,956	9–0	

March (10–1)
Date	Opponent	Rank	Site/stadium	Score	Win	Loss	Save	TV	Attendance	Overall record	SEC record
March 3	at Clemson	#23	Doug Kingsmore Stadium; Clemson, SC	2–5	Lindley (1–1)	**Sanders (1–1)**	None	ACCNX	5,456	9–1	
March 4	vs. Clemson	#23	Fluor Field; Greenville, SC	11–9	**Becker (1–0)**	Dill (1–1)	None	SECN+	7,215	10–1	
March 5	Clemson	#23	Founders Park	7–1	**Hicks (2–0)**	Barlow (1–1)	None	SECN+	8,242	11–1	
March 7	The Citadel	#20	Founders Park	8–1	**Jones (3–0)**	Cummisky (1–1)	None	SECN+	6,034	12–1	
March 8	at USC Upstate	#20	Fluor Field; Greenville, SC	8–1	**Proctor (1–0)**	Curtis (2–1)	None	ESPN+	3,725	13–1	
March 10	Bethune–Cookman	#20	Founders Park	20–3^{7}	**Sanders (2–1)**	Lipthratt, L (1–1)	None	SECN+	5,861	14–1	
March 11	Bethune–Cookman	#20	Founders Park	8–5	**Hall (3–0)**	Santos (2–1)	**Hicks (1)**	SECN+	5,828	15–1	
March 12	Bethune–Cookman	#20	Founders Park	10–3	**Mahoney (2–0)**	Gaviria (2–1)	None	SECN+	6,211	16–1	
March 14	Presbyterian	#16	Founders Park	5–0	**Jones (4–0)**	Mueller (1–1)	None	SECN+	6,211	17–1	
March 17	at Georgia	#16	Foley Field; Athens, Georgia	5–4	**Veach (1–0)**	Hoskins (1–1)	**Hicks (2)**	SECN+	3,712	18–1	1–0
March 18	at Georgia	#16	Foley Field	12–2^{7}	**Hall (4–0)**	Sullivan (3–1)	None	SECN+	3,215	19–1	2–0
March 19	at Georgia	#16	Foley Field	12–1^{7}	**Mahoney (3–0)**	Goldstein (0–1)	None	SECN+	3,167	20–1	3–0
March 21	vs. Charlotte	#11	Truist Field; Charlotte, NC	2–6	Kramer (1–2)	**Jerzembeck (0–1)**	None	ESPN+	2,161	20–2	
March 24	#22 Missouri	#11	Founders Park	9–8	**Williamson (1–0)**	Franklin (4–1)	None	SECN+	8,242	21–2	4–0
March 25	#22 Missouri	#11	Founders Park	8–1	**Hall (5–0)**	Lohse (0–2)	None	SECN+	8,242	22–2	5–0
March 26	#22 Missouri	#11	Founders Park	5–4^{12}	**Becker (2–0)**	Wilmsmeyer (0–1)	None	SECN+	7,019	23–2	6–0
March 28	at The Citadel	#9	Joseph P. Riley Jr. Park; Charleston, SC	13–2^{7}	**Zedalis (1–0)**	Paulsen (0–2)	None	SECN+	6,307	24–2	
March 30	at Mississippi State	#9	Dudy Noble Field; Starkville, MS	6–4	**Hicks (4–0)**	Holcombe (1–1)	**Austin (1)**	SECN+	9,854	25–2	7–0
March 31	at Mississippi State	#9	Dudy Noble Field	3–13	Gartman (2–2)	**Hall (5–1)**	None	SECN+	10,385	25–3	7–1

April
Date	Opponent	Rank	Site/stadium	Score	Win	Loss	Save	TV	Attendance	Overall record	SEC record
April 1	at Mississippi State	#9	Dudy Noble Field	14–5	**Hicks (5–0)**	Hunt (0–1)	None	SECN+	12,357	26–3	8–1
April 4	#13 North Carolina	#6	Truist Field; Charlotte, NC	5–0	**Proctor (2–0)**	Poston (2–1)	None	SECN+	6,277	27–3	
April 6	#1 LSU	#6	Founders Park	14–5	**Hicks (6–0)**	Skenes (5–1)	None	SECN+	8,242	28–3	9–1
April 7	#1 LSU	#6	Founders Park	7–8	Guidry (2–0)	**Jones (4–1)**	None	SECN+	8,242	28–4	9–2
April 8	#1 LSU	#6	Founders Park	cancelled – rain				SECN			
April 11	USC Upstate	#6	Founders Park	7–2	**Becker (3–0)**	Costa, C. (0–1)	None	SECN+	6,640	29–4	
April 14	at #4 Vanderbilt	#6	Hawkins Field; Nashville, TN	14–6	**Sanders (3–1)**	Cunningham (1–1)	None	SECN+	3,802	30–4	10–2
April 15	at #4 Vanderbilt	#6	Hawkins Field	5–8	Reilly (2–1)	**Mahoney (3–1)**	None	SECN+	3,802	30–5	10–3
April 16	at #4 Vanderbilt	#6	Hawkins Field	4–6	Ginther (2–0)	**Jones (4–2)**	None	SECN+	3,802	30–6	10–4
April 18	Charleston Southern	#6	Founders Park	10–4	**Proctor (3-0)**	Olsen, E. (1–2)	None	SECN+	6,420	31–6	
April 20	#3 Florida	#6	Founders Park	13–3^{7}	**Sanders (4–1)**	Sproat (5–2)	None	ESPNU	8,242	32–6	11–4
April 21	#3 Florida	#6	Founders Park	5–2	**Mahoney (4–1)**	Waldrep (6–2)	**Veach (3)**	SECN+	8,242	33–6	12–4
April 22	#3 Florida	#6	Founders Park	7–5	**Becker (4–0)**	Caglianone (4–2)	**Veach (4)**	SECN+	8,242	34–6	13–4
April 28	Auburn	#3	Founders Park	3–8	Vail, T. (4–1)	**Sanders (4–2)**	None	SECN+	8,242	34–7	13–5
April 29	Auburn	#3	Founders Park	5–9	Copeland, K. (3–1)	**Mahoney (4–2)**	None	SECN+	8,242	33–8	13–6
April 30	Auburn	#3	Founders Park	**8–7**	**Veach (2–0)**	Horne, T. (0–1)	**Proctor (1)**	ESPN2	7,254	35–8	14–6

May
Date	Opponent	Rank	Site/stadium	Score	Win	Loss	Save	TV	Attendance	Overall record	SEC record
May 3	at Winthrop	#3	Winthrop Ballpark; Rock Hill, SC	6–1	**Proctor (4–0)**	Bookbinder (5–1)	None	ESPN+	1,836	36–8	
May 5	at Kentucky	#3	Kentucky Proud Park; Lexington, KY	3–7	T. Smith (4–1)	**Sanders (4–3)**	M. Moore (4)	SECN+	2,710	36–9	14–7
May 6	at Kentucky	#3	Kentucky Proud Park	7–14	A Strickland (3–0)	**Hicks (6–1)**	None	SECN+	2,602	36–10	14–8
May 7	at Kentucky	#3	Kentucky Proud Park	2–9	Z. Lee (4–2)	**Becker (4–1)**	None	SECN	3,563	36–11	14–9
May 9	North Florida	#6	Founders Park	5–8	Roca, T. (1–4)	**Eskew (0–1)**	Ohme, W. (1)	SECN+	5,872	36–12	
May 12	at #3 Arkansas	#6	Baum–Walker Stadium; Fayetteville, AR	1–4	Wood (2–0)	**Jones (4–3)**	None	SECN+	10,218	36–13	14–10
May 13	at #3 Arkansas	#6	Baum–Walker Stadium	3–1	**Mahoney (5–2)**	McEntire (6–3)	**Veach (5)**	SECN+	10,432	37–13	15–10
May 14	at #3 Arkansas	#6	Baum–Walker Stadium	1–5	Hollan (7–2)	**Becker (4–2)**	None	SECN+	9,981	37–14	15–11
May 16	Charlotte	#13	Founders Park	9–11	Gillentine (1–1)	**Veach (2–1)**	Michelson (6)	SECN+	6,115	37–15	
May 18	#18 Tennessee	#13	Founders Park	0–5	Lindsey, A. (2–2)	**Jones (4–4)**	None	SECN+	7,815	37–16	15–12
May 19	#18 Tennessee	#13	Founders Park	6–1^{7}	**Mahoney (6–2)**	Dollander (6–6)	None	SECN+	8,242	38–16	16–12
May 20	#18 Tennessee	#13	Founders Park	1–12^{7}	Beam, D. (7–4)	**Becker (4–3)**	None	SECN	6,784	38–17	16–13

Postseason

SEC Tournament
Date	Opponent	Seed	Site/stadium	Score	Win	Loss	Save	TV	Attendance	Overall record	SECT Record
May 23	v. No. 11 (SEC) Georgia	No. 6 (SEC)	Hoover Metropolitan Stadium; Hoover, AL	9–0	**Hicks (7–1)**	Woods (3–3)	**Austin (2)**	SEC Network	5,510	39–17	1–0
May 24	v. #5 / 3 (SEC) LSU	No. 6 (SEC)	Hoover Metropolitan Stadium	3–10	Hurd (5–2)	**Jones (4–5)**	Ackenhausen (2)	SEC Network	7,825	39–18	1–1
May 25	v. No. 10 (SEC) Texas A&M	No. 6 (SEC)	Hoover Metropolitan Stadium	0–5	Lamkin (3–3)	**Mahoney (6–3)**	Dillard (2)	SEC Network	8,120	39–19	1–2

NCAA Columbia Regional
Date	Opponent	Seed	Site/stadium	Score	Win	Loss	Save	TV	Attendance	Overall record	NCAAT record
June 2	v. No. 4 Central Connecticut State	NCAA #15 / No. 1	Founders Park	19–1	**Hicks (8–1)**	Neuman (6–3)	None	ESPN+	8,094	40–19	1–0
June 3	v. No. 3 NC State	#15 / No. 1	Founders Park	6–3	**Mahoney (7–3)**	Willadsen (5–5)	**Veach (6)**	ESPN+	7,115	41–19	2–0
June 4	v. No. 2 / #12 Campbell	#15 / No. 1	Founders Park	16–7	**Proctor (5–0)**	Cummings, T. (6–3)	**Sanders (1)**	ESPN+	7,019	42–19	3–0

NCAA Super Regional
Date	Opponent	Seed	Site/stadium	Score	Win	Loss	Save	TV	Attendance	Overall record	NCAAT record
June 9	v. #2 Florida	NCAA #15	Condron Ballpark; Gainesville, FL	4–5	Sproat (8–3)	**Sanders (4–4)**	Neely (13)	ESPN2	8,439	42–20	3–1
June 10	v. #2 Florida	NCAA #15	Condron Ballpark	0–4	Waldrep (9–3)	**Mahoney (7–4)**	None	ESPN2	8,851	42–21	3–2

Legend: = Win = Loss = Canceled
Bold = South Carolina team member
Rankings are based on the team's current ranking in the D1Baseball poll.

== Regular season ==
=== February ===
UMass–Lowell (Opening day)

Friday, February 17 4:00 pm Columbia, South Carolina SEC+
Team	1	2	3	4	5	6	7	8	9	R	H	E
UMass–Lowell	0	1	1	0	0	0	1	0	0	3	4	1
South Carolina	0	2	3	5	1	7	0	2	X	20	16	0
WP: J. Hicks (1–0) LP: L. Keevan (0–1); Attendance: 7,251; Notes: Wimmer 5-5, 1 HR, McGillis 2 HR's

South Carolina opened its season with a 20–3 win over Umass Lowell, 8 Gamecocks had hits and Braylen Wimmer had 5 hits and 1 HR, Will McGillis hit 2 HR's, Cole Messina had a HR and drove in 3. Will Sanders struck out 3 and only allowed 3 hits. James Hicks picked up the win pitching two scoreless innings and striking out 2.

South Carolina would go on to win the next two games and sweep UMass-Lowell 17–1, and then 12–1

Winthrop

Tuesday, February 21 4:00 pm Columbia, South Carolina SEC+
Team	1	2	3	4	5	6	7	8	9	R	H	E
Winthrop	0	0	0	1	1	0	1	0	0	3	8	0
South Carolina	0	3	0	3	6	5	1	1	X	19	14	2
WP: E. Jones (1–0) LP: B. Hopkins (0–1); Attendance: 6,014; Notes: Petry 3-4, 4 RBI's, Messina grand slam

Queens

Wednesday, February 22 4:00 pm Columbia, South Carolina SEC+
Team	1	2	3	4	5	6	7	8	9	R	H	E
Queens	0	0	0	0	0	0	0	0	0	0	2	0
South Carolina	2	2	2	0	0	0	6	0	X	12	11	0
WP: J. Hicks (2–0) LP: J. Maidhof (0–2); Attendance: 5,944; Notes: Casas 3 hits, 1 HR, Denny 5 RBI's

Penn

Friday, February 24 4:00 pm Columbia, South Carolina SEC+
Team	1	2	3	4	5	6	7	8	9	R	H	E
Penn	0	0	0	0	1	0	3	0	0	4	9	0
South Carolina	0	5	0	0	0	1	0	1	X	7	10	1
WP: W. Sanders (1–0) LP: O. Coady (0–1); Attendance: 7,105; Notes: Petry 3 run HR, Denny 3 hits, 3 RBI's

South Carolina swept Penn 7–4, 1–0, 6–5

=== March ===
vs. Clemson (Greenville)

Saturday, March 4 1:00 pm Columbia, South Carolina SEC+
Team	1	2	3	4	5	6	7	8	9	R	H	E
Clemson	0	0	0	0	3	0	4	0	2	9	12	1
South Carolina	0	0	0	0	0	3	5	3	X	11	10	2
WP: M. Becker (1–0) LP: J. Dill (1–1); Attendance: 7,215; Notes: Messina 3 hits, 1 HR, Hornung 3 run HR

Clemson

Sunday, March 5 1:30 pm Columbia, South Carolina SEC+
Team	1	2	3	4	5	6	7	8	9	R	H	E
Clemson	0	1	0	0	0	0	0	0	0	1	6	1
South Carolina	1	1	0	3	1	0	0	1	X	7	10	1
WP: M. Becker (1–0) LP: J. Dill (1–1); Attendance: 8,242; Notes: Casas 2 HR's, Lecroy 3 run HR

at USC Upstate (Greenville)

Wednesday, March 8 6:30 pm Greenville, South Carolina SEC+
Team	1	2	3	4	5	6	7	8	9	R	H	E
South Carolina	0	7	6	1	0	2	0	1	2	19	18	0
USC Upstate	0	0	1	0	0	0	0	0	9	1	7	1
WP: N. Proctor (1–0) LP: M. Curtis (1–1); Attendance: 3,752; Notes: Wimmer 3 run HR, Brewer HR, Messina 3 hits

Bethune–Cookman

Friday, March 10 7:00 pm Columbia, South Carolina SEC+
Team	1	2	3	4	5	6	7	R	H	E
Bethune–Cookman	0	1	0	0	0	0	0	3	5	2
South Carolina	0	1	2	9	0	8	X	20	13	0
WP: W. Sanders (2–1) LP: L. Lipthratt (1–1); Attendance: 5,861; Notes: Brewer Grand slam, McGillis grand slam, Messina 2 HR's, 4 RBI's

at Georgia

Saturday, March 18 2:00 pm Athens, Georgia SEC+
Team	1	2	3	4	5	6	7	8	9	R	H	E
South Carolina	0	2	0	1	0	0	0	0	2	5	8	0
Georgia	0	0	1	0	0	2	1	0	0	4	9	0
WP: C. Veach (1–0) LP: M. Hoskins (1–1) S = J. Hicks; Attendance: 3,712; Notes: Petry HR, Messina HR, Braswell 2 RBI's

at Georgia

Saturday, March 18 5:30 pm Athens, Georgia SEC+
Team	1	2	3	4	5	6	7	R	H	E
South Carolina	0	0	4	0	7	0	0	12	12	0
Georgia	0	1	0	0	0	1	0	2	7	2
WP: N. Hall (4–0) LP: L. Sullivan (3–1); Attendance: 3,215; Notes: Petry 2 HR's, Wimmer 3 RBI's

== Record vs. conference opponents ==
Last two do not qualify for conf. tourn. Blank are not scheduled. Blue are home games, otherwise away.

2023 SEC baseball records Source: 2023 SEC baseball game results, 2023 SEC baseball schedule
Team	W–L	ALA	ARK	AUB	FLA	UGA	KEN	LSU	MSU	MIZZ	MISS	SCAR	TENN	TAMU	VAN	Team	Div	SR	SW
ALA	16–14		1–2	2–1	1–2	.	1–2	0–3	1–2	3–0	3–0	.	.	2–1	2–1	ALA	W4	5–5	2–1
ARK	20–10	2–1		3–0	.	0–3	.	1–2	3–0	.	2–1	2–1	3–0	3–0	1–2	ARK	W1	7–3	4–1
AUB	17–13	1–2	0–3		1–2	2–1	.	2–1	2–1	3–0	3–0	2–1	.	1–2	.	AUB	W3	6–4	2–1
FLA	20–10	2–1	.	2–1		2–1	2–1	.	.	3–0	3–0	0–3	2–1	1–2	3–0	FLA	E1	8–2	3–1
UGA	11–19	.	3–0	1–2	1–2		2–1	1–2	.	0–3	1–2	0–3	2–1	.	0–3	UGA	E6	3–7	1–3
KEN	16–14	2–1	.	.	1–2	1–2		1–2	3–0	3–0	.	3–0	1–2	1–2	0–3	KEN	E5	4–6	3–1
LSU	19–10	3–0	2–1	1–2	.	2–1	2–1		1–2	.	3–0	1–1	2–1	2–1	.	LSU	W2	7–2	2–0
MSU	9–21	2–1	0–3	1–2	.	.	0–3	2–1		.	2–1	1–2	0–3	1–2	0–3	MSU	W6	3–7	0–4
MIZZ	10–20	0–3	.	0–3	0–3	3–0	0–3	.	.		2–1	0–3	3–0	1–2	1–2	MIZZ	E7	3–7	2–5
MISS	6–24	0–3	1–2	0–3	0–3	2–1	.	0–3	1–2	1–2		.	.	1–2	0–3	MISS	W7	1–9	0–5
SCAR	16–13	.	1–2	1–2	3–0	3–0	0–3	1–1	2–1	3–0	.		1–2	.	1–2	SCAR	E3	4–5	3–1
TENN	16–14	.	0–3	.	1–2	1–2	2–1	1–2	3–0	0–3	.	2–1		3–0	3–0	TENN	E4	5–5	3–2
TAMU	14–16	1–2	0–3	2–1	2–1	.	2–1	1–2	2–1	2–1	2–1	.	0–3		.	TAMU	W5	6–4	0–2
VAN	19–11	1–2	2–1	.	0–3	3–0	3–0	.	3–0	2–1	3–0	2–1	0–3	.		VAN	E2	7–3	4–2
Team	W–L	ALA	ARK	AUB	FLA	UGA	KEN	LSU	MSU	MIZZ	MISS	SCAR	TENN	TAMU	VAN	Team	Div	SR	SW

Updated for entire regular season. Tiebrkrs: FLA>ARK VAN common. KEN&TENN>ALA LSU common. TENN>KEN hd–hd.

== Rankings ==
Ranking movements Legend: ██ Increase in ranking ██ Decrease in ranking — = Not ranked
	Week																		
Poll	Pre	1	2	3	4	5	6	7	8	9	10	11	12	13	14	15	16	17	Final
Coaches'	—	—*	23	20	14	11													
Baseball America	—	—	—	23	19	14	10												
Collegiate Baseball^	—	—	29	25	14	4	2												
NCBWA†	28	25	24	20	14	9													
D1Baseball	23	23	23	20	16	11													

^ Collegiate Baseball ranked 40 teams in their preseason poll, but only ranked 30 teams weekly during the season.
† NCBWA ranks 30 teams in their preseason poll, but only ranks 25 teams weekly during the season.
* A new poll was not released for this week, so for comparison purposes, the previous week's ranking is inserted in this week's slot.

== See also ==
- 2023 South Carolina Gamecocks softball team
