= 2023 Vanderbilt Commodores baseball team =

American college baseball season

2023 Vanderbilt Commodores baseball

SEC tournament champions

Nashville Regional, 1–2
- Conference: Southeastern Conference
- Eastern Division

Ranking
- Coaches: No. 4
- CB: No. 2
- Record: 42–20 (19–11 SEC)
- Head coach: Tim Corbin (21st season)
- Assistant coaches: Scott Brown; Mike Baxter
- Home stadium: Hawkins Field

2023 Southeastern Conference baseball standings
	Conf.						Overall
Team	W		L		T	PCT	W		L		T	PCT
Eastern
No. 2 Florida ^{x}‍†‍‍^{y}	20	–	10	–	0	.667	54	–	17	–	0	.761
No. 19 Vanderbilt ‍‍‡‍^{y}	19	–	11	–	0	.633	42	–	20	–	0	.677
No. 13 South Carolina ‍‍‍^{y}	16	–	13	–	0	.552	42	–	21	–	0	.667
No. 7 Tennessee ‍‍‍^{y}	16	–	14	–	0	.533	44	–	22	–	0	.667
No. 17 Kentucky ‍‍‍^{y}	16	–	14	–	0	.533	40	–	21	–	0	.656
Georgia ‍‍‍	11	–	19	–	0	.367	29	–	27	–	0	.518
Missouri ‍‍‍	10	–	20	–	0	.333	30	–	24	–	0	.556
Western
No. 16 Arkansas ^{x}‍†‍‍^{y}	20	–	10	–	0	.667	43	–	18	–	0	.705
No. 1 LSU ‍‍‍^{y}	19	–	10	–	0	.655	54	–	17	–	0	.761
Auburn ‍‍‍^{y}	17	–	13	–	0	.567	34	–	23	–	1	.595
No. 10 Alabama ‍‍‍^{y}	16	–	14	–	0	.533	43	–	21	–	0	.672
Texas A&M ‍‍‍^{y}	14	–	16	–	0	.467	38	–	27	–	0	.585
Mississippi State ‍‍‍	9	–	21	–	0	.300	27	–	26	–	0	.509
Ole Miss ‍‍‍	6	–	24	–	0	.200	25	–	29	–	0	.463
x – Division champion † – Conference champion ‡ – Tournament champion y – Invited to the NCAA tournament As of June 26, 2023; Rankings from D1Baseball

The 2023 Vanderbilt Commodores baseball team represented Vanderbilt University during the 2023 NCAA Division I baseball season. The Commodores played their home games at Hawkins Field.

== Previous season ==
The Commodores finished 39–23, 14–16 in the SEC to finish in fourth place in the East division. Vanderbilt was eliminated in the second round of the 2022 Southeastern Conference baseball tournament by their in-state rivals, Tennessee. They earned an at-large berth into the 2022 NCAA Division I baseball tournament, and were the second seed in the Corvallis Regional. Vanderbilt lost to top seed, and third overall seed, Oregon State in the regional final.

== Preseason ==
=== Preseason SEC awards and honors ===
Infielder Cam Redding was named to the SEC Preseason team.

Preseason All-SEC First Team
Player	No.	Position	Class
Enrique Bradfield	51	SP	Junior

Preseason All-SEC Second Team
Player	No.	Position	Class
Carter Holton	20	SP	Sophomore

=== Coaches poll ===
The SEC baseball coaches' poll was released on February 9, 2023. Vanderbilt was picked to finish third the SEC East.

SEC East Coaches' Poll
Predicted finish	Team	Points
1	Tennessee	90 (12)
2	Florida	79 (2)
3	Vanderbilt	64
4	South Carolina	51
5	Georgia	48
6	Kentucky	34
7	Missouri	19

== Game log ==
2023 Vanderbilt Commodores baseball game log (42–20)
Regular season (37–17)

February (6–3)
Date	Opponent	Rank	Site/stadium	Score	Win	Loss	Save	TV	Attendance	Overall record	SEC record
State Farm College Baseball Showdown
February 17	vs. No. 15 TCU*	No. 10	Globe Life Field; Arlington, TX	**L** 4–11	Savage (1–0)	**Hliboki** (0–1)	None	FloSports	15,721	0–1	—
February 18	vs. No. 9 Oklahoma State*	No. 10	Globe Life Field	**W** 11–9	**Dutkanych** (1–0)	Phillips, B. (0–1)	**N. Maldonado** (1)	FloSports	20,295	1–1	—
February 19	vs. Texas*	No. 10	Globe Life Field	**W** 12–2	**Futrell** (1–0)	Sthele (0–1)	**Cunningham** (1)	FloSports	16,100	2–1	—
February 21	Central Arkansas*	No. 10	Hawkins Field; Nashville, TN	**L** 4–5	Macrae (1–0)	**Reilly** (0–1)	Gregson (1)	SECN+	3,642	2–2	—
February 22	UAB*	No. 10	Hawkins Field	**W** 13–1^{7}	**Horn** (1–0)	C. Daniel (0–1)	None	SECN+	3,604	3–2	—
February 24	No. 17 UCLA*	No. 10	Hawkins Field	**W** 6–0	**Holton** (1–0)	Brooks (1–1)	**Cunningham** (2)	SECN+	3,778	4–2	—
February 25	No. 17 UCLA*	No. 10	Hawkins Field	**L** 0–3	Delvecchio (1–0)	**Hliboki** (0–2)	Jewett (1)	SECN+	3,793	4–3	—
February 26	No. 17 UCLA*	No. 10	Hawkins Field	**W** 2–1	**Futrell** (2–0)	Austin (1–1)	**N. Maldonado** (2)	SECN+	3,798	5–3	—
February 28	Austin Peay*	No. 7	Hawkins Field	**W** 11–7	**Carter** (1–0)	Robinson, J. (0–1)	None	SECN+	3,550	6–3	—

March (15–2)
Date	Opponent	Rank	Site/stadium	Score	Win	Loss	Save	TV	Attendance	Overall record	SEC record
2023 Cambria College Classic
March 3	vs. Nebraska*	No. 7	U.S. Bank Stadium; Minneapolis, MN	**L** 3–5	Schanaman, S (1–1)	**Schultz** (0–1)	None	BTN+	545	6–4	—
March 4	vs. No. 18 Maryland*	No. 7	U.S. Bank Stadium	**W** 8–7	**N. Maldonado** (1–0)	McCoy, K. (0–1)	None	BTN+	3,888	7–4	—
March 5	at Minnesota*	No. 7	U.S. Bank Stadium	**W** 4–0	**Hliboki** (1–2)	Holetz (0–1)	None	BTN+	2,796	8–4	—
March 7	Tennessee Tech*	No. 7	Hawkins Field	**W** 12–1	**Futrell** (3–0)	Taylor, C. (0–2)	None	SECN+	3,637	9–4	—
March 8	Evansville*	No. 7	Hawkins Field	**W** 2–1^{17}	**Thompson** (1–0)	Hardman (0–1)	None	SECN+	3,491	10–4	—
March 10	Loyola Marymount*	No. 7	Hawkins Field	**W** 2–1	**Hliboki** (2–2)	A. Schroeder (1–1)	None	SECN+	3,492	11–4	—
March 11	Loyola Marymount*	No. 7	Hawkins Field	**W** 2–0	**Owen** (1–0)	Z. Kirby (0–1)	**N. Maldonado** (3)	SECN+	3,676	12–4	—
March 12	Loyola Marymount*	No. 7	Hawkins Field	**L** 6–9	O. Hackman (1–1)	**Futrell** (3–1)	M. Baldo (3)	SECN+	3,566	12–5	—
March 14	vs. Belmont*	No. 6	First Horizon Park; Nashville, TN	**W** 15–6	**Reilly** (1–1)	Ruzicka (0–2)	None	SECN+	1,410	13–5	—
March 16	No. 3 Ole Miss	No. 6	Hawkins Field	**W** 12–2^{8}	**Holton** (2–0)	J. Dougherty (2–2)	None	ESPNU	3,802	14–5	1—0
March 17	No. 3 Ole Miss	No. 6	Hawkins Field	**W** 8–0	**Owen** (2–0)	G. Saunier (1–1)	None	SECN+	3,802	15–5	2—0
March 18	No. 3 Ole Miss	No. 6	Hawkins Field	**W** 7–2	**Futrell** (4–1)	X. Rivas (4–1)	None	SECN	3,802	16–5	3—0
March 21	vs. Lipscomb*	No. 6	First Horizon Park	Cancelled							
March 24	at Mississippi State	No. 4	Dudy Noble Field; Starkville, MS	**W** 26–3^{7}	**Holton** (3–0)	Cijntje (3–1)	None	SECN+	11,080	17–5	4—0
March 25	at Mississippi State	No. 4	Dudy Noble Field	**W** 18–5	**Owen** (3–0)	Gartman (1–2)	None	SECN+	12,927	18–5	5—0
March 26	at Mississippi State	No. 4	Dudy Noble Field	**W** 11–7	**Hliboki** (3–2)	Dohm (3–3)	None	SECN+	9,872	19–5	6—0
March 28	Lipscomb*	No. 4	Hawkins Field	**W** 11–1^{8}	**Carter** (2–0)	Frank, H (0–1)	None	SECN+	2,451	20–5	—
March 31	Georgia	No. 4	Hawkins Field	**W** 9–2	**Holton** (3–0)	Woods, Ja. (3–2)	None	SECN+	3,802	21–5	7—0

April (11–6)
Date	Opponent	Rank	Site/stadium	Score	Win	Loss	Save	TV	Attendance	Overall record	SEC record
April 1	Georgia	No. 4	Hawkins Field	**W** 16–8	**Cunningham** (1–0)	Pearson, W. (0–1)	None	SECN+	3,802	22–5	8—0
April 2	Georgia	No. 4	Hawkins Field	**W** 4–0	**Futrell** (5–1)	Hoskins (1–2)	None	SECN+	3,802	23–5	9—0
April 4	Western Kentucky*	No. 4	Hawkins Field	**W** 8—1	**Schultz** (1—1)	Bennett, J. (0—1)	None	SECN+	3,645	24–5	—
April 6	at Missouri	No. 4	Taylor Stadium; Columbia, MO	**W** 7—6	**Ginther** (1—0)	Lunceford (3—1)	**N. Maldonado** (4)	SECN+	1,320	25–5	10—0
April 7	at Missouri	No. 4	Taylor Stadium	**L** 4—5	Franklin (5—2)	**Hliboki** (3—3)	None	SECN+	1,912	25–6	10—1
April 8	at Missouri	No. 4	Taylor Stadium	**W** 5–0	**Futrell** (6–1)	Murphy (3–3)	None	SECN+	2,389	26–6	11—1
April 11	North Alabama*	No. 4	Hawkins Field	**W** 14—2^{7}	**Thompson** (2–0)	B. Parish (0–1)	None	SECN+	3,677	27–6	—
April 14	No. 6 South Carolina	No. 4	Hawkins Field	**L** 6—14	Sanders (3–1)	**Cunningham** (1–1)	None	SECN+	3,802	27–7	11—2
April 15	No. 6 South Carolina	No. 4	Hawkins Field	**W** 8–5	**Reilly** (2–1)	Mahoney (3–1)	None	SECN+	3,802	28–7	12—2
April 16	No. 6 South Carolina	No. 4	Hawkins Field	**W** 6–4	**Ginther** (2–0)	Jones (4–2)	None	SECN+	3,802	29–7	13—2
April 18	Indiana State*	No. 4	Hawkins Field	**L** 2–10	Cutts, B (1–3)	**Thompson** (2–1)	None	SECN+	3,746	29–8	—
April 21	at Tennessee	No. 4	Lindsey Nelson Stadium; Knoxville, TN	**L** 3–4^{12}	Burns, C. (3–3)	**N. Maldonado** (1–1)	None	SECN+	4,607	29–9	13–3
April 22	at Tennessee	No. 4	Lindsey Nelson Stadium	**L** 1–17^{7}	Dollander (5–4)	**Cunningham** (1–2)	None	ESPN2	4,619	29–10	13–4
April 23	at No. 19 Tennessee	No. 2	Lindsey Nelson Stadium	**L** 5–10	Beam, D. (5–2)	**Futrell** (6–2)	None	ESPN2	4,518	29–11	13–5
April 28	No. 15 Kentucky	No. 5	Hawkins Field	**W** 6–4	**Reilly** (3–1)	D. Williams (3–1)	**N. Maldonado** (5)	SECN+	3,802	30–11	14–5
April 29	No. 15 Kentucky	No. 5	Hawkins Field	**W** 9–3	**Schultz** (2–1)	T. Bosma (4–3)	None	SECN+	3,802	31–11	15–5
April 30	No. 15 Kentucky	No. 5	Hawkins Field	**W** 3–2	**Anderson** (1–0)	R. Hagenow (2–1)	None	SECN+	3,802	32–11	16–5

May (5–6)
Date	Opponent	Rank	Site/stadium	Score	Win	Loss	Save	TV	Attendance	Overall record	SEC record
May 2	Georgia State*	No. 5	Hawkins Field	**W** 11–5	**Anderson** (2–0)	McManmon, Q. (1–1)	None	SECN+	3,750	33–11	—
May 4	at Alabama	No. 5	Sewell–Thomas Stadium; Tuscaloosa, AL	**L** 2–11	Holman (6–2)	**Holton** (4–1)	None	SECN+	3,418	33–12	16–6
May 5	at Alabama	No. 5	Sewell–Thomas Stadium	**W** 4–1	**Owen** (4–0)	McMillan (1–2)	**N. Maldonado** (6)	SECN+	3,960	34–12	17–6
May 6	at Alabama	No. 5	Sewell–Thomas Stadium	**L** 1–2	Woods (4–1)	**Schultz** (2–2)	Davis (6)	SECN+	5,800	34–13	17–7
May 9	at Louisville*	No. 5	Jim Patterson Stadium; Louisville, KY	**W** 12–8^{12}	**Horn** (2–0)	Robinson (0–1)	None	ESPNU	3,456	35–13	—
May 12	at No. 7 Florida	No. 5	Condron Ballpark; Gainesville, FL	**L** 0–10^{7}	Sproat (7–2)	**Reilly** (3–2)	None	SECN+	6,970	35–14	17–8
May 13	at No. 7 Florida	No. 5	Condron Ballpark	**L** 2–6	Slater (8–0)	**Futrell** (6–3)	None	SECN	7,508	35–15	17–9
May 14	at No. 7 Florida	No. 5	Condron Ballpark	**L** 2–6	Caglianone (5–2)	**Carter** (2–1)	None	SECN+	5,712	35–16	17–10
May 16	Middle Tennessee*	No. 5	Hawkins Field	Cancelled							
May 18	No. 2 Arkansas	No. 12	Hawkins Field	**L** 2–8	Smith (8–1)	**Reilly** (3–3)	McEntire (2)	SECN+	3,802	35–17	17–11
May 19	No. 2 Arkansas	No. 12	Hawkins Field	**W** 10–8	**Cunningham** (2–2)	Adcock (4–2)	**N. Maldonado** (7)	SECN+	3,802	36–17	18–11
May 20	No. 2 Arkansas	No. 12	Hawkins Field	**W** 7–6	**Horn** (3–0)	Coil (0–1)	**N. Maldonado** (8)	SECN+	3,802	37–17	19–11

Postseason (5–3)

SEC Tournament (4–1)
Date	Opponent	Rank	Site/stadium	Score	Win	Loss	Save	TV	Attendance	Overall record	SEC record
May 24	vs. No. 19 (5) Auburn	No. 12 (4)	Hoover Metropolitan Stadium; Hoover, AL	**W** 6–4	**Reilly** (4–3)	Allsup, C. (1–2)	None	SECN	12,685	38–17	1–0
May 25	vs. No. 2 (1) Florida	No. 12 (4)	Hoover Metropolitan Stadium	**L** 3–6	Slater (9–0)	**Cunningham** (2–3)	Abner (3)	SECN	12,875	38–18	1–1
May 26	vs. No. 24 (9) Alabama	No. 12 (4)	Hoover Metropolitan Stadium	**W** 9–2	**Futrell** (7–3)	McNairy (6–2)	Schultz (1)	SECN	15,012	39–18	2–1
May 27	vs. No. 2 (1) Florida	No. 12 (4)	Hoover Metropolitan Stadium	**W** 11–6	**Moore** (1–0)	Caglianone (6–3)	None	SECN	8,938	40–18	3–1
May 28	vs. (10) Texas A&M	No. 12 (4)	Hoover Metropolitan Stadium	**W** 10–4	**Reilly** (5–3)	Cortez (3–1)	None	ESPN2	8,728	41–18	4–1

Nashville Regional (1–2)
Date	Opponent	Seed/rank	Site/stadium	Score	Win	Loss	Save	TV	Attendance	Overall record	NCAAT record
June 2	(4) Eastern Illinois*	No. 4 (1)	Hawkins Field	**W** 12–2	**Futrell** (8–3)	Hampton, K (7–3)	**Schultz** (2)	SECN+	3,802	42–18	1–0
June 3	No. 24 (2) Oregon*	No. 4 (1)	Hawkins Field	**L** 7–8	Spoljaric, T (7–0)	**Ginther** (2–1)	Mollerus, J (11)	SECN+	3,802	42–19	1–1
June 4	(3) Xavier*	No. 4 (1)	Hawkins Field	**L** 1–2	Hoskins (7–2)	**Reilly** (5–4)	Loer (7)	SECN+	3,802	42–20	1–2

*Denotes non–conference game • Schedule source • Rankings based on the teams' current ranking in the D1Baseball poll
**W** Vanderbilt win • **L** Vanderbilt loss • Postponement or cancellation • **Bold** denotes Vanderbilt player

== Statistics ==
=== Record vs. conference opponents ===
Last two do not qualify for conf. tourn. Blank are not scheduled. Blue are home games, otherwise away.

2023 SEC baseball records Source: 2023 SEC baseball game results, 2023 SEC baseball schedule
Team	W–L	ALA	ARK	AUB	FLA	UGA	KEN	LSU	MSU	MIZZ	MISS	SCAR	TENN	TAMU	VAN	Team	Div	SR	SW
ALA	16–14		1–2	2–1	1–2	.	1–2	0–3	1–2	3–0	3–0	.	.	2–1	2–1	ALA	W4	5–5	2–1
ARK	20–10	2–1		3–0	.	0–3	.	1–2	3–0	.	2–1	2–1	3–0	3–0	1–2	ARK	W1	7–3	4–1
AUB	17–13	1–2	0–3		1–2	2–1	.	2–1	2–1	3–0	3–0	2–1	.	1–2	.	AUB	W3	6–4	2–1
FLA	20–10	2–1	.	2–1		2–1	2–1	.	.	3–0	3–0	0–3	2–1	1–2	3–0	FLA	E1	8–2	3–1
UGA	11–19	.	3–0	1–2	1–2		2–1	1–2	.	0–3	1–2	0–3	2–1	.	0–3	UGA	E6	3–7	1–3
KEN	16–14	2–1	.	.	1–2	1–2		1–2	3–0	3–0	.	3–0	1–2	1–2	0–3	KEN	E5	4–6	3–1
LSU	19–10	3–0	2–1	1–2	.	2–1	2–1		1–2	.	3–0	1–1	2–1	2–1	.	LSU	W2	7–2	2–0
MSU	9–21	2–1	0–3	1–2	.	.	0–3	2–1		.	2–1	1–2	0–3	1–2	0–3	MSU	W6	3–7	0–4
MIZZ	10–20	0–3	.	0–3	0–3	3–0	0–3	.	.		2–1	0–3	3–0	1–2	1–2	MIZZ	E7	3–7	2–5
MISS	6–24	0–3	1–2	0–3	0–3	2–1	.	0–3	1–2	1–2		.	.	1–2	0–3	MISS	W7	1–9	0–5
SCAR	16–13	.	1–2	1–2	3–0	3–0	0–3	1–1	2–1	3–0	.		1–2	.	1–2	SCAR	E3	4–5	3–1
TENN	16–14	.	0–3	.	1–2	1–2	2–1	1–2	3–0	0–3	.	2–1		3–0	3–0	TENN	E4	5–5	3–2
TAMU	14–16	1–2	0–3	2–1	2–1	.	2–1	1–2	2–1	2–1	2–1	.	0–3		.	TAMU	W5	6–4	0–2
VAN	19–11	1–2	2–1	.	0–3	3–0	3–0	.	3–0	2–1	3–0	2–1	0–3	.		VAN	E2	7–3	4–2
Team	W–L	ALA	ARK	AUB	FLA	UGA	KEN	LSU	MSU	MIZZ	MISS	SCAR	TENN	TAMU	VAN	Team	Div	SR	SW

Updated for entire regular season. Tiebrkrs: FLA>ARK VAN common. KEN&TENN>ALA LSU common. TENN>KEN hd–hd.

== Rankings ==
Ranking movements Legend: ██ Increase in ranking ██ Decrease in ranking
	Week																
Poll	Pre	1	2	3	4	5	6	7	8	9	10	11	12	13	14	15	Final
Coaches'	9	9*	7	9	8	5	4	4	4								
Baseball America	6	5	5	7	8	5	4	4	4								
Collegiate Baseball^	9	9	9	9	8	8	6	2	2								
NCBWA†	9	9	8	9	8	5	4	4	4								
D1Baseball	10	10	7	7	6	4	4	4	4								

^ Collegiate Baseball ranked 40 teams in their preseason poll, but only ranked 30 teams weekly during the season.
† NCBWA ranks 30 teams in their preseason poll, but only ranks 25 teams weekly during the season.
* A new poll was not released for this week, so for comparison purposes, the previous week's ranking is inserted in this week's slot.
