= 2023 Kentucky Wildcats baseball team =

2023 season of University of Kentucky baseball team

2023 Kentucky Wildcats baseball

Lexington Regional champions

Baton Rouge Super Regional, 0–2
- Conference: Southeastern Conference
- Eastern Division
- CB: No. 17
- Record: 40–21 (16–13 SEC)
- Head coach: Nick Mingione (7th season)
- Assistant coaches: Will Coggin; Dan Roszel
- Home stadium: Kentucky Proud Park

2023 Southeastern Conference baseball standings
	Conf.						Overall
Team	W		L		T	PCT	W		L		T	PCT
Eastern
No. 2 Florida ^{x}‍†‍‍^{y}	20	–	10	–	0	.667	54	–	17	–	0	.761
No. 19 Vanderbilt ‍‍‡‍^{y}	19	–	11	–	0	.633	42	–	20	–	0	.677
No. 13 South Carolina ‍‍‍^{y}	16	–	13	–	0	.552	42	–	21	–	0	.667
No. 7 Tennessee ‍‍‍^{y}	16	–	14	–	0	.533	44	–	22	–	0	.667
No. 17 Kentucky ‍‍‍^{y}	16	–	14	–	0	.533	40	–	21	–	0	.656
Georgia ‍‍‍	11	–	19	–	0	.367	29	–	27	–	0	.518
Missouri ‍‍‍	10	–	20	–	0	.333	30	–	24	–	0	.556
Western
No. 16 Arkansas ^{x}‍†‍‍^{y}	20	–	10	–	0	.667	43	–	18	–	0	.705
No. 1 LSU ‍‍‍^{y}	19	–	10	–	0	.655	54	–	17	–	0	.761
Auburn ‍‍‍^{y}	17	–	13	–	0	.567	34	–	23	–	1	.595
No. 10 Alabama ‍‍‍^{y}	16	–	14	–	0	.533	43	–	21	–	0	.672
Texas A&M ‍‍‍^{y}	14	–	16	–	0	.467	38	–	27	–	0	.585
Mississippi State ‍‍‍	9	–	21	–	0	.300	27	–	26	–	0	.509
Ole Miss ‍‍‍	6	–	24	–	0	.200	25	–	29	–	0	.463
x – Division champion † – Conference champion ‡ – Tournament champion y – Invited to the NCAA tournament As of June 26, 2023; Rankings from D1Baseball

The 2023 Kentucky Wildcats baseball team represented the University of Kentucky in the 2023 NCAA Division I baseball season. The Wildcats played their home games at Kentucky Proud Park.

== Previous season ==
The Wildcats finished 33–26, 12–18 in the SEC to finish in sixth place in the East division. They competed in the SEC tournament, but not in the NCAA tournament.

== Personnel ==
=== Roster ===
2023 Kentucky Wildcats roster
Pitchers: 5 - Darren Williams - Graduate Student; 10 - Seth Chavez - Senior; 11 - Colby Frieda - Sophomore; 16 - Austin Strickland - Junior; 20 - Mason Moore - Sophomore; 23 - Magdiel Cotto - Junior; 24 - Ryan Hagenow - Junior; 25 - Seth Logue - Junior; 26 - Drew Lafferty - Freshman; 28 - Hayden Smith - Freshman; 30 - Aaron Blum - Freshman; 33 - Travis Smith - (redshirt) Freshman; 35 - Tyler Bosma - Graduate Student; 36 - Logan Martin - Senior; 40 - Zach Hise - (redshirt) Sophomore; 41 - Evan Byers - (redshirt) Sophomore; 43 - Jackson Nove - Sophomore; 44 - Reed Gannon - (redshirt) Freshman; 46 - Christian Howe - (redshirt) Freshman; 48 - Zack Lee - Senior	Catchers: 7 - Devin Burkes - (redshirt) Sophomore; 9 - Chase Stanke - Senior; Infielders: 2 - Jase Felker - Senior; 4 - Émilien Pitre - Sophomore; 6 - Reuben Church - Junior; 8 - Isaiah Byars - Senior; 12 - Grant Smith - Senior; 13 - James McCoy - (redshirt) Freshman; 14 - Hunter Gilliam - (redshirt) Senior; 22 - Patrick Herrera - Sophomore	Outfielders: 0 - Kendal Ewell - Junior; 19 - Nolan McCarthy - Sophomore; 34 - Lukas Schramm - Freshman; 51 - Jackson Gray - Senior; Utility: 1 - Ryder Giles - Senior; 21 - Ryan Waldschmidt - Sophomore; 47 - Carson Applegate - Freshman; 52 - Austin Fawley - Freshman

=== Coaching staff ===
2023 Kentucky Wildcats coaching staff
Name	Position
Nick Mingione	Head coach
Dan Roszel	Assistant Coach/Pitching
Will Coggin	Assistant Coach/Recruiting Coordinator
Nick Ammirati	Volunteer Assistant Coach

== Schedule and results ==
2023 Kentucky Wildcats baseball game log
Regular season

February
Date	Opponent	Rank	Site/stadium	Score	Win	Loss	Save	TV	Attendance	Overall record	SEC record
February 17	at Elon		Latham Park; Elon, NC	0-2	Sprague (1–0)	L. Martin (0–1)	Simon (1)		787	0-1	
February 18	at Elon		Latham Park	5-1	T. Bosma (1–0)	Mitrovich (0–1)	A Strickland (1)		863	1-1	
February 19	at Elon		Latham Park	4-0	Z. Lee (1–0)	Sprock (0–1)	None		702	2-1	
February 21	Evansville		Kentucky Proud Park; Lexington, KY	6-3	T. Smith (1–0)	Harris (0–1)	M. Moore (1)		1,994	3-1	
February 24	Wright State		Kentucky Proud Park	8-3	L. Martin (1-1)	Shirk, J (1-1)	D. Williams (1)		1,775	4-1	
February 25	Wright State		Kentucky Proud Park	9-12	Gongora, S (1–0)	T. Bosma (1-1)	Luikart, J (1)		1,817	4-2	
February 26	Wright State		Kentucky Proud Park	15-0	Z. Lee (2–0)	Theis, A (0–2)	None		1,948	5-2	
February 28	Morehead State		Kentucky Proud Park	15-1	T. Smith (2–0)	Bradshaw, R. (0–1)	None		1,948	6-2	

March
Date	Opponent	Rank	Site/stadium	Score	Win	Loss	Save	TV	Attendance	Overall record	SEC record
March 4	Indiana State		Kentucky Proud Park	4-2	D. Williams (1–0)	Lybarger, B (1-1)	None		1,963	7-2	
March 4	Indiana State		Kentucky Proud Park	5-4	T. Bosma (2–1)	Jachec, M (0–2)	M. Moore (2)		2,066	8-2	
March 5	Indiana State		Kentucky Proud Park	7-6	R. Hagenow (1–0)	Cutts, B (0–2)	None		2,128	9-2	
March 7	Murray State		Kentucky Proud Park	6-2	J. Nove (1–0)	Lyke (0–1)	M. Moore (3)		1,675	10-2	
March 8	Ohio		Kentucky Proud Park	9-2	A Strickland (1–0)	Jerger, Jayd (0–1)	None		1,491	11-2	
March 10	at Southern Illinois		Itchy Jones Stadium; Carbondale, Illinois	5-4^{10}	S. Chavez (1–0)	J. Bloemer (1-1)	None		416	12-2	
March 11	Southern Illinois		Itchy Jones Stadium	7-2	T. Bosma (3–1)	E. Dermody (1-1)	None		280	13-2	
March 12	Southern Illinois		Itchy Jones Stadium	12-3	Z. Lee (3–0)	P. Bonzagni (1–2)	None		372	14-2	
March 14	Indiana		Kentucky Proud Park	12-2	J. Nove (2–0)	Levy (0–2)	None	SECN+	1,486	15-2	
March 17	Mississippi State		Kentucky Proud Park	6-5^{10}	S. Chavez (2–0)	Dohm (3–2)	None	SECN+	1,646	16-2	1-0
March 18	Mississippi State		Kentucky Proud Park	12-3	R. Hagenow (2–0)	Gartman (1-1)	None	SECN+	1,827	17-2	2-0
March 19	Mississippi State		Kentucky Proud Park	17-3^{7}	R. Giles (1–0)	Yntema (1–2)	None	SECN	1,680	18-2	3-0
March 21	Eastern Kentucky	22	Kentucky Proud Park	9-3	J. Nove (3–0)	Vargas, A. (1-1)	None		1,963	19-2	
March 24	at No. 25 Alabama	22	Sewell–Thomas Stadium; Tuscaloosa, Alabama	4-3^{12}	Hise (1–0)	Myers (0–1)	Hagenow (1)	SEC+	3,175	20-2	4-0
March 25	at No. 25 Alabama	22	Sewell–Thomas Stadium	9-5	Strickland (2–0)	Holman (4–1)	None	SECN	4,321	21-2	5-0
March 26	at No. 25 Alabama	22	Sewell–Thomas Stadium	3-4	Woods (2–0)	Chavez (2–1)	None	SECN	3,164	21-3	5-1
March 28	at Western Kentucky	16	Nick Denes Field; Bowling Green, Kentucky	10-8	Logue (1–0)	Jones(2–1)	Hise (1)		682	22-3	
March 31	No. 25 Missouri	16	Kentucky Proud Park	12-2^{7}	Williams (2–0)	Troesser (2-2)	None	SECN+	2,018	23-3	6-1

April
Date	Opponent	Rank	Site/stadium	Score	Win	Loss	Save	TV	Attendance	Overall record	SEC record
April 1	No. 25 Missouri	16	Kentucky Proud Park	10-0^{8}	Bosma (4–1)	Franklin (4–2)	None	SECN+	3,156	24-3	7-1
April 2	No. 25 Missouri	16	Kentucky Proud Park	3-1	Moore (1–0)	Murphy (3–2)	Chavez (1)	SECN	2,646	25-3	8-1
April 4	Dayton	9	Kentucky Proud Park	13-6	Cotto (1–0)	Packard (0–5)	None	SECN+	3,274	26-3	
April 7	at Georgia	9	Foley Field; Athens, Georgia	7-4	Moore (2–0)	Marsh (1-1)	None	SECN+	3,282	27-3	9-1
April 9	at Georgia	9	Foley Field	0-3	Sullivan (4–1)	Bosma (4–2)	None	SECN	2,763	27-4	9-2
April 9	at Georgia	9	Foley Field	2-6	Goldstein (1-1)	Lee (3–1)	Finley (1)	SECN+	2,763	27-5	9-3
April 11	at Louisville		Jim Patterson Stadium; Louisville, KY	Postponed							
April 13	at No. 1 LSU	11	Alex Box Stadium; Baton Rouge, Louisiana	6-16	Hise (1-1)	None	SECN	11,061	27-6	9-4	
April 14	at No. 1 LSU	11	Alex Box Stadium	13-10	Williams (3–0)	Herring (2–1)	Giles (1)	SECN+	11,675	28-6	10-4
April 15	at No. 1 LSU	11	Alex Box Stadium	6-7	Collins (2–0)	Lee (3–2)	None	SECN+	10,912	28-7	10-5
April 18	Xavier	11	Kentucky Proud Park	13-2	Smith (3–0)	Hoskins (4–2)	None	SECN+	2,662	29-7	
April 22	Texas A&M	11	Kentucky Proud Park	3-6	Aschenbeck (6–0)	R. Giles (1-1)	Johnston (3)	SECN+	3,582	29-8	10-6
April 22	Texas A&M	11	Kentucky Proud Park	7-8	Sdao (1–2)	M. Moore (2–1)	Johnston (4)	SECN+	3,012	29-9	10-7
April 23	Texas A&M	11	Kentucky Proud Park	8-1	E. Byers (1–0)	Dillard (1–3)	None	SECN+	2,906	30-9	11-7
April 25	Louisville	15	Kentucky Proud Park	0-7	Webster (2-2)	T. Smith (3–1)	None	SECN	5,292	30-10	
April 28	at No. 5 Vanderbilt	15	Hawkins Field; Nashville, TN	4-6	Reilly (3–1)	D. Williams (3–1)	N. Maldonado (5)	SECN+	3,802	30-11	11-8
April 29	at No. 5 Vanderbilt	15	Hawkins Field	3-6	Schultz (2–1)	T. Bosma (4–3)	None	SECN+	3,802	30-12	11-9
April 30	at No. 5 Vanderbilt	15	Hawkins Field	2-3	Anderson (1–0)	R. Hagenow (2–1)	None	SECN	3,802	30-13	11-10

May
Date	Opponent	Rank	Site/stadium	Score	Win	Loss	Save	TV	Attendance	Overall record	SEC record
May 5	No. 3 South Carolina	21	Kentucky Proud Park	7-3	T. Smith (4–1)	Sanders (4–3)	M. Moore (4)	SECN+	2,710	31-13	12-10
May 6	No. 3 South Carolina	21	Kentucky Proud Park	14-7	A Strickland (3–0)	Hicks (6–1)	None	SECN+	2,602	32-13	13-10
May 7	No. 3 South Carolina	21	Kentucky Proud Park	9-2	Lee (4–2)	Becker (4–1)	None	SECN	3,563	33-13	14-10
May 9	Tennessee Tech	17	Kentucky Proud Park	9-2	Howe (1–0)	Walter (0–1)	None	SECN+	2,258	34-13	
May 12	at No. 23 Tennessee	17	Lindsey Nelson Stadium; Knoxville, TN	6-10	Lindsey, A. (1–2)	T. Smith (4–2)	None	SECN+	4,502	34-14	14-11
May 13	at No. 23 Tennessee	17	Lindsey Nelson Stadium	7-10	Dollander (6–5)	T. Bosma (4-4)	Burns, C. (1)	SECN	4,457	34-15	14-12
May 14	at No. 23 Tennessee	17	Lindsey Nelson Stadium	10-0	D. Williams (4–1)	Beam, D. (6–4)	None	SECN+	4,478	35-15	15-12
May 18	No. 4 Florida	19	Kentucky Proud Park	3-10	Waldrep (7–3)	T. Smith (4–3)	Slater (3)	SECN+	3,021	35-16	15-3
May 19	No. 4 Florida	19	Kentucky Proud Park	6-4	Z. Lee (5–2)	Sproat (7–3)	D. Williams (2)	SECN+	4,286	36-16	16-13
May 20	No. 4 Florida	19	Kentucky Proud Park	2-5	Caglianone (6–2)	Strickland (3–1)	None	SECN+	3,884	36-17	16-14

Postseason

SEC Tournament
Date	Opponent	Seed	Site/stadium	Score	Win	Loss	Save	TV	Attendance	Overall record	SECT Record
May 23	Alabama		Hoover Metropolitan Stadium; Hoover, AL	0-4	Furtado (1-1)	D. Williams (4–2)	None	SECN		36-18	0-1

NCAA tournament: Lexington Regional (3–1)
Date	Opponent	Rank	Stadium Site	Score	Win	Loss	Save	Attendance	Overall Record	Regional Record
June 2	Ball State; First round		Kentucky Proud Park	4-0	M. Moore (3–1)	T. O'Donnell (5–4)	None	4,935	37-18	1–0
June 3	Indiana; Second round		Kentucky Proud Park	3-5	Foley (4–2)	Z. Lee (5–3)	None	6,094	37-19	1–1
June 4	West Virginia; Third round		Kentucky Proud Park	10-0	A Strickland (4–1)	Siegel, G. (4–3)	None	4,016	38-19	2–1
June 4	Indiana; Regional finals		Kentucky Proud Park	16-6	R. Hagenow (3–1)	Seiler (1–4)	None	4,703	39-19	3–1
June 5	Indiana; Regional finals		Kentucky Proud Park	4-2	M. Moore (4–1)	Bothwell (4–3)	None	6,796	40-19	4–1

NCAA tournament: Baton Rouge Super Regional
Date	Opponent	Rank	Stadium Site	Score	Win	Loss	Save	Attendance	Overall Record	Super Reg. Record
June 10	No. 7 LSU		Alex Box Stadium	0-14	Skenes (12–2)	Z. Lee (5–4)	None	12,452	40-20	0–1
June 11	No. 7 LSU		Alex Box Stadium	3-8	Cooper (4–3)	A Strickland (4–2)	Guidry (3)	12,640	40-21	0–2

Legend: = Win = Loss = Canceled
Bold = Kentucky team member
Rankings are based on the team's current ranking in the D1Baseball poll.

== Record vs. conference opponents ==
Last two did not qualify for conference tournament. Blank are not scheduled. Blue are home games, otherwise away.

2023 SEC baseball records Source: 2023 SEC baseball game results, 2023 SEC baseball schedule
Team	W–L	ALA	ARK	AUB	FLA	UGA	KEN	LSU	MSU	MIZZ	MISS	SCAR	TENN	TAMU	VAN	Team	Div	SR	SW
ALA	16–14		1–2	2–1	1–2	.	1–2	0–3	1–2	3–0	3–0	.	.	2–1	2–1	ALA	W4	5–5	2–1
ARK	20–10	2–1		3–0	.	0–3	.	1–2	3–0	.	2–1	2–1	3–0	3–0	1–2	ARK	W1	7–3	4–1
AUB	17–13	1–2	0–3		1–2	2–1	.	2–1	2–1	3–0	3–0	2–1	.	1–2	.	AUB	W3	6–4	2–1
FLA	20–10	2–1	.	2–1		2–1	2–1	.	.	3–0	3–0	0–3	2–1	1–2	3–0	FLA	E1	8–2	3–1
UGA	11–19	.	3–0	1–2	1–2		2–1	1–2	.	0–3	1–2	0–3	2–1	.	0–3	UGA	E6	3–7	1–3
KEN	16–14	2–1	.	.	1–2	1–2		1–2	3–0	3–0	.	3–0	1–2	1–2	0–3	KEN	E5	4–6	3–1
LSU	19–10	3–0	2–1	1–2	.	2–1	2–1		1–2	.	3–0	1–1	2–1	2–1	.	LSU	W2	7–2	2–0
MSU	9–21	2–1	0–3	1–2	.	.	0–3	2–1		.	2–1	1–2	0–3	1–2	0–3	MSU	W6	3–7	0–4
MIZZ	10–20	0–3	.	0–3	0–3	3–0	0–3	.	.		2–1	0–3	3–0	1–2	1–2	MIZZ	E7	3–7	2–5
MISS	6–24	0–3	1–2	0–3	0–3	2–1	.	0–3	1–2	1–2		.	.	1–2	0–3	MISS	W7	1–9	0–5
SCAR	16–13	.	1–2	1–2	3–0	3–0	0–3	1–1	2–1	3–0	.		1–2	.	1–2	SCAR	E3	4–5	3–1
TENN	16–14	.	0–3	.	1–2	1–2	2–1	1–2	3–0	0–3	.	2–1		3–0	3–0	TENN	E4	5–5	3–2
TAMU	14–16	1–2	0–3	2–1	2–1	.	2–1	1–2	2–1	2–1	2–1	.	0–3		.	TAMU	W5	6–4	0–2
VAN	19–11	1–2	2–1	.	0–3	3–0	3–0	.	3–0	2–1	3–0	2–1	0–3	.		VAN	E2	7–3	4–2
Team	W–L	ALA	ARK	AUB	FLA	UGA	KEN	LSU	MSU	MIZZ	MISS	SCAR	TENN	TAMU	VAN	Team	Div	SR	SW

Updated for entire regular season. Tiebreakers: Florida over Arkansas (comparing results vs. Vanderbilt). Kentucky and Tennessee over Alabama (comparing results vs. LSU). Tennessee over Kentucky (using head-to-head result).
