= 2023 Florida Gators baseball team =

2023 season of University of Florida baseball team

2023 Florida Gators baseball

SEC regular season co-champions Gainesville Regional champions Gainesville Super Regional champions

College World Series runners-up, 1–2 in CWS Finals
- Conference: Southeastern Conference
- Eastern Division

Ranking
- Coaches: No. 2
- CB: No. 2
- Record: 54–17 (20–10 SEC)
- Head coach: Kevin O'Sullivan (16th season)
- Assistant coaches: Chuck Jeroloman; Taylor Black; David Kopp
- Home stadium: Condron Ballpark

2023 Southeastern Conference baseball standings
	Conf.						Overall
Team	W		L		T	PCT	W		L		T	PCT
Eastern
No. 2 Florida ^{x}‍†‍‍^{y}	20	–	10	–	0	.667	54	–	17	–	0	.761
No. 19 Vanderbilt ‍‍‡‍^{y}	19	–	11	–	0	.633	42	–	20	–	0	.677
No. 13 South Carolina ‍‍‍^{y}	16	–	13	–	0	.552	42	–	21	–	0	.667
No. 7 Tennessee ‍‍‍^{y}	16	–	14	–	0	.533	44	–	22	–	0	.667
No. 17 Kentucky ‍‍‍^{y}	16	–	14	–	0	.533	40	–	21	–	0	.656
Georgia ‍‍‍	11	–	19	–	0	.367	29	–	27	–	0	.518
Missouri ‍‍‍	10	–	20	–	0	.333	30	–	24	–	0	.556
Western
No. 16 Arkansas ^{x}‍†‍‍^{y}	20	–	10	–	0	.667	43	–	18	–	0	.705
No. 1 LSU ‍‍‍^{y}	19	–	10	–	0	.655	54	–	17	–	0	.761
Auburn ‍‍‍^{y}	17	–	13	–	0	.567	34	–	23	–	1	.595
No. 10 Alabama ‍‍‍^{y}	16	–	14	–	0	.533	43	–	21	–	0	.672
Texas A&M ‍‍‍^{y}	14	–	16	–	0	.467	38	–	27	–	0	.585
Mississippi State ‍‍‍	9	–	21	–	0	.300	27	–	26	–	0	.509
Ole Miss ‍‍‍	6	–	24	–	0	.200	25	–	29	–	0	.463
x – Division champion † – Conference champion ‡ – Tournament champion y – Invited to the NCAA tournament As of June 26, 2023; Rankings from D1Baseball

The 2023 Florida Gators baseball team represented the University of Florida in the sport of baseball during the 2023 college baseball season. Florida competed in the Eastern Division of the Southeastern Conference (SEC). Home games were played at Condron Ballpark on the university's Gainesville, Florida, campus, in the third season at the ballpark. The team was coached by Kevin O'Sullivan in his sixteenth season as Florida's head coach. The Gators entered the season looking to return to the College World Series after a home regional final loss in the 2022 NCAA tournament.

Florida returned to the College World Series for the first time since the 2018 season. In a rematch of the 2017 championship series won by Florida, LSU defeated the Gators in the championship series 2–1, handing the Gators their third runner-up finish at the College World Series.

== Previous season ==
Ranked ninth in the D1 Baseball preseason poll, the Gators dropped their opening series against unranked Liberty, and would not reach the top 10 again until the opening weekend of conference play, which was highlighted by a 2–1 series win at rival Miami. The Gators would go 3–3 against their first two conference opponents in Alabama and LSU, and defeated Florida State in their annual game in Jacksonville. However, Florida got swept at Georgia to drop to 3–6 in conference play. The Gators bounced back by taking the series against No. 2 Arkansas at home to get back to 5–7 against the conference. Traveling to Tallahassee to play the second of three games against Florida State, the Seminoles evened the series at one win apiece. The Gators lost their next two games in Nashville before avoiding the sweep against Vanderbilt. Florida would return home to host the top-ranked Tennessee Volunteers, who had lost only one conference game up to that point. The Volunteers were able to sweep the Gators by mounting a ninth-inning comeback and 11-inning defeat in the series finale, to move the Gators to 6–12 against the conference, featuring a 4–11 stretch against the gauntlet of LSU, Georgia, Arkansas, Vanderbilt, and Tennessee. The Gators moved to an even 15–15 conference record by the end of the season, winning each of their remaining series against Kentucky, defending national champion Mississippi State, Missouri, and South Carolina, and won the season series against Florida State in Gainesville with a 7–5 ten-inning victory.

In a SEC baseball tournament marred by significant weather delays, the Gators were able to overcome a second-round loss to Texas A&M by winning their next three games, including a semifinal win to avenge their earlier second round loss to the Aggies, to set up a Championship Game against the regular season champion Volunteers. Florida was able to stymie the prolific Volunteers offense for the first four innings, but ultimately surrendered the first seven runs of the game in a 5–8 loss.

Florida's run in the SEC Tournament proved to be enough to earn a No. 13 national seed, and host the Gainesville Regional. After a second-round loss to the Oklahoma Sooners, Florida was able to hold off Central Michigan with a 6–5 victory in the elimination game to set up a rematch against Oklahoma in the regional final. Florida was able to take the first game with a 7–2 victory to set up a winner-take-all game for the right to advance to the Super Regional against Virginia Tech. Florida got a 2–1 lead in the seventh inning before a 5-hour, 33-minute rain delay struck Gainesville. Florida was able to add to their lead to obtain a 3–1 advantage over the Sooners in the bottom of the seventh inning, but surrendered four runs in the top of the eighth inning, and was only able to make up one of the runs in the bottom of the ninth inning. As a result, their season came to a close with a late-night, rain delayed, 4–5 home loss to the eventual national runners-up.

== Preseason ==
=== Preseason SEC awards and honors ===
Outfielder and catcher, Wyatt Langford and BT Riopelle, respectively, were named to the All-SEC preseason first-team.

Preseason All-SEC First Team
Player	No.	Position	Class
Wyatt Langford	36	OF	Junior
BT Riopelle	15	C	Senior

Preseason All-SEC Second Team
Player	No.	Position	Class
Hurston Waldrep	12	P	Junior

=== Coaches poll ===
The SEC baseball coaches' poll was released on February 9, 2023.

SEC East Coaches' Poll
Predicted finish	Team	Points
1	Tennessee	90 (12)
2	Florida	79 (2)
3	Vanderbilt	64
4	South Carolina	51
5	Georgia	48
6	Kentucky	34
7	Missouri	19

== Roster ==
2023 Florida Gators baseball team
Players
Coaches

#	Pos.	Name	B/T	Height	Weight	Year	Home town
1	INF	Dale Thomas	R/R	5 ft 10 in (1.78 m)	205 lb (93 kg)	Jr	De Leon Springs, FL
2	OF	Ty Evans	L/L	6 ft 2 in (1.88 m)	215 lb (98 kg)	So	Auburndale, FL
3	LHP	Cade Fisher	L/L	6 ft 4 in (1.93 m)	215 lb (98 kg)	Fr	Dalton, GA
4	INF	Cade Kurland	R/R	5 ft 11 in (1.8 m)	190 lb (86 kg)	Fr	Tampa, FL
5	INF	Colby Halter	L/R	6 ft 1 in (1.85 m)	205 lb (93 kg)	Jr	Jacksonville, FL
6	INF	Tyler Shelnut	R/R	6 ft 2 in (1.88 m)	190 lb (86 kg)	Jr	Lake City, FL
8	RHP	Brandon Sproat	R/R	6 ft 3 in (1.91 m)	215 lb (98 kg)	Jr	Pace, FL
9	C	Salvy Alvarez	R/R	5 ft 10 in (1.78 m)	185 lb (84 kg)	Fr	Miami, FL
10	RHP	Tyler Nesbitt	R/R	6 ft 3 in (1.91 m)	200 lb (91 kg)	RS So	LaBelle, FL
11	OF	Michael Robertson	L/R	6 ft 2 in (1.88 m)	190 lb (86 kg)	RS Fr	Venice, FL
12	RHP	Hurston Waldrep	R/R	6 ft 2 in (1.88 m)	210 lb (95 kg)	Jr	Thomasville, GA
13	RHP	Ryan Slater	R/R	6 ft 3 in (1.91 m)	190 lb (86 kg)	RS So	Palm Harbor, FL
14	LHP	Jac Caglianone	L/L	6 ft 5 in (1.96 m)	245 lb (111 kg)	So	Tampa, FL
15	C	BT Riopelle	L/R	6 ft 0 in (1.83 m)	215 lb (98 kg)	Sr	Marietta, GA
16	C	Rene Lastres	R/R	6 ft 3 in (1.91 m)	220 lb (100 kg)	So	Hialeah Gardens, FL
17	RHP	Yoel Tejada Jr.	R/R	6 ft 3 in (1.91 m)	200 lb (91 kg)	So	LaBelle, FL
18	LHP	Pierce Coppola	L/L	6 ft 8 in (2.03 m)	240 lb (109 kg)	So	Verona, NJ
20	RHP	Jake Clemente	R/R	6 ft 3 in (1.91 m)	225 lb (102 kg)	Fr	Coral Springs, FL
21	RHP	Sam Sloan	R/R	6 ft 3 in (1.91 m)	200 lb (91 kg)	RS So	Bartow, FL
22	RHP	Brandon Neely	R/R	6 ft 3 in (1.91 m)	210 lb (95 kg)	So	Seville, FL
23	INF	Deric Fabian	R/R	6 ft 3 in (1.91 m)	190 lb (86 kg)	So	Ocala, FL
24	INF	Josh Rivera	R/R	6 ft 2 in (1.88 m)	215 lb (98 kg)	Jr	Avon Park, FL
25	OF	Richie Schiekofer	L/R	6 ft 0 in (1.83 m)	180 lb (82 kg)	Gr	Millburn, NJ
26	RHP	Clete Hartzog	L/R	6 ft 0 in (1.83 m)	175 lb (79 kg)	Jr	Panama City, FL
27	RHP	Fisher Jameson	R/R	6 ft 5 in (1.96 m)	220 lb (100 kg)	So	Lake Worth, FL
28	C	Luke Heyman	R/R	6 ft 4 in (1.93 m)	210 lb (95 kg)	Fr	Longwood, FL
32	OF	Tucker Talbott	R/R	6 ft 2 in (1.88 m)	185 lb (84 kg)	RS So	Atlantic Beach, FL
33	OF	Erik Blair	L/L	5 ft 11 in (1.8 m)	190 lb (86 kg)	Fr	Fort Lauderdale, FL
36	OF	Wyatt Langford	R/R	6 ft 1 in (1.85 m)	220 lb (100 kg)	Jr	Trenton, FL
41	RHP	Blake Purnell	R/R	6 ft 3 in (1.91 m)	210 lb (95 kg)	RS So	Boynton Beach, FL
43	OF	Matt Prevesk	L/L	6 ft 3 in (1.91 m)	210 lb (95 kg)	So	Apopka, FL
46	RHP	Nic Ficarrotta	R/R	6 ft 3 in (1.91 m)	190 lb (86 kg)	RS So	Palm Harbor, FL
47	LHP	Chris Arroyo	L/L	6 ft 2 in (1.88 m)	220 lb (100 kg)	So	Gurabo, PR
49	LHP	Carsten Finnvold	L/L	6 ft 1 in (1.85 m)	190 lb (86 kg)	So	Boca Raton, FL
50	RHP	Anthony Ursitti	R/R	6 ft 4 in (1.93 m)	215 lb (98 kg)	So	Fort Myers, FL
55	LHP	Philip Abner	L/L	6 ft 1 in (1.85 m)	230 lb (104 kg)	So	Charlotte, NC
66	OF	Max Brown	R/R	6 ft 2 in (1.88 m)	200 lb (91 kg)	Fr	Tulsa, OK

Head coach

7 Kevin O'Sullivan

Assistant coach(es)

Taylor Black
Chuck Jeroloman
David Kopp
Mike Rivera

Legend

- (C) Team captain
- (S) Suspended
- (I) Ineligible
- Injured
- Current redshirt

Roster
Last update: October 4, 2023

== Schedule ==
Legend
	Florida win
	Florida loss
	Postponement
**Bold**	Florida team member

2023 Florida Gators baseball game log
Regular season

February (8–1)
Date	Opponent	Rank	Stadium Site	Score	Win	Loss	Save	Attendance	Overall Record	SEC Record
February 17	Charleston Southern	No. 7	Condron Ballpark; Gainesville, FL	**W** 13–3^{7}	**B. Sproat** (1–0)	Z. Robinson (0–1)	None	5,924	1–0	–
February 18	Charleston Southern	No. 7	Condron Ballpark	**W** 16–2^{7}	**H. Waldrep** (1–0)	R. Gleason (0–1)	None	6,661	2–0	–
February 19	Charleston Southern	No. 7	Condron Ballpark	**W** 8–0	**J. Caglianone** (1–0)	E. Truitt (0–1)	None	5,458	3–0	–
February 21	at South Florida	No. 7	USF Baseball Stadium; Tampa, FL	**W** 6–1	**R. Slater** (1–0)	E. Brown (0–1)	**B. Neely** (1)	2,573	4–0	–
February 22	South Florida	No. 7	Condron Ballpark	**L** 9–10	C. Dorsey (1–0)	**F. Jameson** (0–1)	None	4,686	4–1	–
February 24	Cincinnati	No. 7	Condron Ballpark	**W** 13–6	**B. Sproat** (2–0)	G. Harker (0–1)	None	5,620	5–1	–
February 25	Cincinnati	No. 7	Condron Ballpark	**W** 13–3^{8}	**H. Waldrep** (2–0)	C. Horst (0–1)	None	6,798	6–1	–
February 26	Cincinnati	No. 7	Condron Ballpark	**W** 13–7	**C. Fisher** (1–0)	C. Hopewell (0–1)	**B. Neely** (2)	5,393	7–1	–
February 28	at Jacksonville	No. 6	John Sessions Stadium; Jacksonville, FL	**W** 18–8	**R. Slater** (2–0)	B. Fisher (0–2)	None	1,542	8–1	–

March (14–4)
Date	Opponent	Rank	Stadium Site	Score	Win	Loss	Save	Attendance	Overall Record	SEC Record
March 1	Jacksonville	No. 6	Condron Ballpark	**L** 8–10	B. Barquin (1–0)	**F. Jameson** (0–2)	C. Lotito (2)	4,852	8–2	–
March 3	No. 22 Miami; Rivalry	No. 6	Condron Ballpark	**W** 10–4	**B. Sproat** (3–0)	G. Ziehl (1–2)	**C. Fisher** (1)	8,081	9–2	–
March 4	No. 22 Miami; Rivalry	No. 6	Condron Ballpark	**L** 6–14	C. Scinta (1–0)	**F. Jameson** (0–3)	None	7,853	9–3	–
March 5	No. 22 Miami; Rivalry	No. 6	Condron Ballpark	**W** 14–4^{8}	**J. Caglianone** (2–0)	A. Rosario (1–1)	None	6,896	10–3	–
March 7	Florida Atlantic	No. 6	Condron Ballpark	**W** 18–11	**R. Slater** (3–0)	C. Williams (0–1)	None	4,737	11–3	–
March 8	Florida Atlantic	No. 6	Condron Ballpark	**W** 11–0^{8}	**T. Nesbitt** (1–0)	M. Martzolf (2–1)	**P. Abner** (1)	4,760	12–3	–
March 10	Siena	No. 6	Condron Ballpark	**W** 3–2	**C. Fisher** (2–0)	B. Rozakis (1–3)	**B. Neely** (3)	4,776	13–3	–
March 11	Siena	No. 6	Condron Ballpark	**W** 11–0^{7}	**H. Waldrep** (3–0)	R. Bates (1–2)	**R. Slater** (1)	5,748	14–3	–
March 12	Siena	No. 6	Condron Ballpark	**W** 12–2^{7}	**J. Caglianone** (3–0)	S. Bentz (0–3)	None	5,563	15–3	–
March 14	North Florida	No. 5	Condron Ballpark	**W** 7–2	**F. Jameson** (1–3)	C. Boroski (1–3)	None	4,836	16–3	–
March 16	No. 24 Alabama	No. 5	Condron Ballpark	**W** 3–0	**B. Sproat** (4–0)	H. Furtado (0–1)	None	5,546	17–3	1–0
March 17 (1)^{[a]}	No. 24 Alabama	No. 5	Condron Ballpark	**W** 8–7	**P. Abner** (1–0)	R. Quick (0–1)	None	6,118	18–3	2–0
March 17 (2)	No. 24 Alabama	No. 5	Condron Ballpark	**L** 3–6	G. Hitt (3–1)	**H. Waldrep** (3–1)	K. Woods (1)	6,118	18–4	2–1
March 21	at Florida State; Rivalry	No. 3	Dick Howser Stadium; Tallahassee, FL	**W** 9–5	**P. Abner** (2–0)	J. Arnold (1–2)	None	6,384	19–4	–
March 24	at No. 13 Ole Miss	No. 3	Swayze Field; Oxford, MS	Postponed (rain) Makeup: March 25 as a split doubleheader						
March 25 (1)	at No. 13 Ole Miss	No. 3	Swayze Field	**W** 9–7	**P. Abner** (3–0)	M. Nichols (1–1)	**B. Neely** (4)	11,560	20–4	3–1
March 25 (2)	at No. 13 Ole Miss	No. 3	Swayze Field	**W** 12–8	**H. Waldrep** (4–1)	G. Saunier (1–2)	**N. Ficarrotta** (1)	10,392	21–4	4–1
March 26	at No. 13 Ole Miss	No. 3	Swayze Field	**W** 7–4	**C. Arroyo** (1–0)	X. Rivas (4–2)	**B. Neely** (5)	9,823	22–4	5–1
March 28	vs. Florida State; Rivalry	No. 3	121 Financial Park; Jacksonville, FL	Postponed (inclement weather) Makeup: May 2						
March 31	Auburn	No. 3	Condron Ballpark	**L** 1–10	T. Bauman (2–0)	**B. Sproat** (4–1)	None	6,828	22–5	5–2
^{^[a]}Rescheduled from March 18 as a single-admission doubleheader due to the threat of inclement weather.

April (13–5)
Date	Opponent	Rank	Stadium Site	Score	Win	Loss	Save	Attendance	Overall Record	SEC Record
April 1	Auburn	No. 3	Condron Ballpark	**W** 12–5	**H. Waldrep** (5–1)	J. Armstrong (5–1)	**B. Neely** (6)	7,354	23–5	6–2
April 2	Auburn	No. 3	Condron Ballpark	**W** 17–8	**R. Slater** (4–0)	D. Nelson (2–2)	None	5,793	24–5	7–2
April 4	Bethune–Cookman	No. 3	Condron Ballpark	**W** 8–4	**C. Hartzog** (1–0)	L. Lipthratt (2–2)	None	4,835	25–5	–
April 6	at No. 11 Tennessee	No. 3	Lindsey Nelson Stadium; Knoxville, TN	**W** 6–1	**B. Sproat** (5–1)	C. Hollander (4–3)	None	4,727	26–5	8–2
April 7	at No. 11 Tennessee	No. 3	Lindsey Nelson Stadium	**W** 9–3	**H. Waldrep** (6–1)	C. Burns (2–3)	None	4,202	27–5	9–2
April 8	at No. 11 Tennessee	No. 3	Lindsey Nelson Stadium	**L** 2–14^{8}	D. Beam (4–1)	**J. Caglianone** (3–1)	None	4,020	27–6	9–3
April 11	Florida State; Rivalry	No. 3	Condron Ballpark	**W** 5–3	**C. Fisher** (3–0)	D. Kirkland (1–1)	**B. Neely** (7)	7,441	28–6	–
April 14	Georgia	No. 3	Condron Ballpark	**L** 11–13	D. Rhadans (2–0)	**B. Neely** (0–1)	L. Finley (2)	6,994	28–7	9–4
April 15	Georgia	No. 3	Condron Ballpark	**W** 2–1	**R. Slater** (5–0)	C. March (1–2)	None	7,632	29–7	10–4
April 16	Georgia	No. 3	Condron Ballpark	**W** 11–6	**J. Caglianone** (4–1)	L. Sullivan (4–2)	None	6,087	30–7	11–4
April 18	Florida A&M	No. 3	Condron Ballpark	**W** 17–7^{7}	**Y. Tejada Jr.** (1–0)	J. Townsend (0–4)	None	5,019	31–7	–
April 20	at No. 6 South Carolina	No. 3	Founders Park; Columbia, SC	**L** 3–13^{7}	W. Sanders (4–1)	**B. Sproat** (5–2)	None	8,242	31–8	11–5
April 21	at No. 6 South Carolina	No. 3	Founders Park	**L** 2–5	J. Mahoney (4–1)	**H. Waldrep** (6–2)	C. Veach (3)	8,242	31–9	11–6
April 22	at No. 6 South Carolina	No. 3	Founders Park	**L** 5–7	M. Becker (4–0)	**J. Caglianone** (4–2)	C. Veach (4)	8,242	31–10	11–7
April 25	North Florida	No. 4	Condron Ballpark	**W** 6–2	**Y. Tejada Jr.** (2–0)	A. Love (0–2)	**R. Slater** (2)	4,769	32–10	–
April 28	Missouri	No. 4	Condron Ballpark	**W** 11–1^{7}	**B. Sproat** (6–2)	C. Murphy (3–4)	None	5,516	33–10	12–7
April 29	Missouri	No. 4	Condron Ballpark	**W** 11–7	**R. Slater** (6–0)	Z. Franklin (6–3)	**B. Neely** (8)	5,546	34–10	13–7
April 30	Missouri	No. 4	Condron Ballpark	**W** 8–7	**C. Fisher** (4–0)	L. Lunceford (3–4)	**B. Neely** (9)	5,698	35–10	14–7

May (7–3)
Date	Opponent	Rank	Stadium Site	Score	Win	Loss	Save	Attendance	Overall Record	SEC Record
May 2	vs. Florida State; Rivalry	No. 4	121 Financial Park	**W** 7–5	**B. Purnell** (1–0)	A. Armstrong (1–3)	**P. Abner** (2)	8,210	36–10	–
May 5	at Texas A&M	No. 4	Olsen Field; College Station, TX	**W** 6–5	**R. Slater** (7–0)	B. Garcia (1–2)	**B. Neely** (9)	5,884	37–10	15–7
May 6	at Texas A&M	No. 4	Olsen Field	**L** 2–15^{7}	C. Cortez (2–0)	**H. Waldrep** (6–3)	None	6,987	37–11	15–8
May 7	at Texas A&M	No. 4	Olsen Field	**L** 2–3	B. Garcia (2–2)	**B. Neely** (0–2)	None	5,565	37–12	15–9
May 12	No. 5 Vanderbilt	No. 7	Condron Ballpark	**W** 10–0^{7}	**B. Sproat** (7–2)	P. Reilly (3–2)	None	6,970	38–12	16–9
May 13	No. 5 Vanderbilt	No. 7	Condron Ballpark	**W** 6–2	**R. Slater** (8–0)	D. Futrell (6–3)	None	7,508	39–12	17–9
May 14	No. 5 Vanderbilt	No. 7	Condron Ballpark	**W** 6–2	**J. Caglianone** (5–2)	G. Carter (2–1)	None	5,712	40–12	18–9
May 18	at No. 19 Kentucky	No. 4	Kentucky Proud Park; Lexington, KY	**W** 10–3	**H. Waldrep** (7–3)	T. Smith (4–3)	**R. Slater** (3)	3,021	41–12	19–9
May 19	at No. 19 Kentucky	No. 4	Kentucky Proud Park	**L** 4–6	Z. Lee (5–2)	**B. Sproat** (7–3)	D. Williams (2)	4,286	41–13	19–10
May 20	at No. 19 Kentucky	No. 4	Kentucky Proud Park	**W** 5–2	**J. Caglianone** (6–2)	A. Strickland (3–1)	None	3,884	42–13	20–10

Postseason

SEC Tournament (2–1)
Date	Opponent	Rank	Stadium Site	Score	Win	Loss	Save	Attendance	Overall Record	SECT Record
May 24	vs. No. 24 (9) Alabama; Second round	No. 2 (1)	Hoover Metropolitan Stadium; Hoover, AL	**W** 7–6^{11}	**C. Fisher** (5–0)	A. Davis II (0–2)	None	12,685	43–13	1–0
May 25	vs. No. 8 (4) Vanderbilt; Third round	No. 2 (1)	Hoover Metropolitan Stadium	**W** 6–3	**R. Slater** (9–0)	B. Cunningham (2–3)	**P. Abner** (3)	12,875	44–13	2–0
May 27	vs. No. 8 (4) Vanderbilt; Semifinals	No. 2 (1)	Hoover Metropolitan Stadium	**L** 6–11	G. Moore (1–0)	**J. Caglianone** (6–3)	None	8,938	44–14	2–1

NCAA tournament: Gainesville Regional (4–1)
Date	Opponent	Rank	Stadium Site	Score	Win	Loss	Save	Attendance	Overall Record	Regional Record
June 2	(4) Florida A&M; First round	No. 2 (1)	Condron Ballpark	**W** 3–0	**J. Caglianone** (7–3)	C. Granger (6–5)	**B. Neely** (11)	7,367	45–14	1–0
June 3	(3) Texas Tech; Second round	No. 2 (1)	Condron Ballpark	**L** 4–5	E. Coombes (4–0)	**R. Slater** (9–1)	B. Beckel (7)	7,311	45–15	1–1
June 4 (1)	No. 10 (2) Connecticut; Second round elimination game	No. 2 (1)	Condron Ballpark	**W** 8–2	**H. Waldrep** (8–3)	G. Coe (6–3)	None	5,586	46–15	2–1
June 4 (2)	(3) Texas Tech; Regional final game 1	No. 2 (1)	Condron Ballpark	**W** 7–1	**C. Fisher** (6–0)	Z. Petty (3–2)	**B. Neely** (12)	5,793	47–15	3–1
June 5	(3) Texas Tech; Regional final game 2	No. 2 (1)	Condron Ballpark	**W** 6–0	**R. Slater** (10–1)	J. Rogers (2–3)	None	5,881	48–15	4–1

NCAA tournament: Gainesville Super Regional (2–0)
Date	Opponent	Rank	Stadium Site	Score	Win	Loss	Save	Attendance	Overall Record	Super Reg. Record
June 9	(15) South Carolina	No. 2 (2)	Condron Ballpark	**W** 5–4	**B. Sproat** (8–3)	W. Sanders (4–4)	**B. Neely** (13)	8,439	49–15	1–0
June 10	(15) South Carolina	No. 2 (2)	Condron Ballpark	**W** 4–0	**H. Waldrep** (9–3)	J. Mahoney (7–4)	None	8,851	50–15	2–0

NCAA tournament: College World Series (4–2)
Date	Opponent	Rank	Stadium Site	Score	Win	Loss	Save	Attendance	Overall Record	CWS Record
June 16	vs. No. 11 (7) Virginia; First round	No. 2 (2)	Charles Schwab Field; Omaha, NE	**W** 6–5	**B. Neely** (1–2)	J. Berry (0–5)	None	24,801	51–15	1–0
June 18	vs. Oral Roberts; Second round	No. 2 (2)	Charles Schwab Field	**W** 5–4	**H. Waldrep** (10–3)	H. Gollert (10–2)	**C. Fisher** (2)	24,841	52–15	2–0
June 21	vs. No. 17 TCU; Semifinals	No. 2 (2)	Charles Schwab Field	**W** 3–2	**B. Neely** (2–2)	B. Abeldt (3–4)	None	23,889	53–15	3–0
Championship Series										Record
June 24	vs. No. 7 (5) LSU	No. 2 (2)	Charles Schwab Field	**L** 3–4^{11}	R. Cooper (5–3)	**B. Neely** (2–3)	None	25,258	53–16	0–1
June 25	vs. No. 7 (5) LSU	No. 2 (2)	Charles Schwab Field	**W** 24–4	**B. Purnell** (2–0)	N. Ackenhausen (3–1)	**N. Ficarrotta** (2)	25,292	54–16	1–1
June 26	vs. No. 7 (5) LSU	No. 2 (2)	Charles Schwab Field	**L** 4–18	T. Hurd (8–3)	**J. Caglianone** (7–4)	None	24,878	54–17	1–2

Schedule source:

*Rankings are based on the team's current ranking in the D1Baseball poll.

== Record vs. conference opponents ==
Last two do not qualify for conf. tourn. Blank are not scheduled. Blue are home games, otherwise away.

2023 SEC baseball records Source: 2023 SEC baseball game results, 2023 SEC baseball schedule
Team	W–L	ALA	ARK	AUB	FLA	UGA	KEN	LSU	MSU	MIZZ	MISS	SCAR	TENN	TAMU	VAN	Team	Div	SR	SW
ALA	16–14		1–2	2–1	1–2	.	1–2	0–3	1–2	3–0	3–0	.	.	2–1	2–1	ALA	W4	5–5	2–1
ARK	20–10	2–1		3–0	.	0–3	.	1–2	3–0	.	2–1	2–1	3–0	3–0	1–2	ARK	W1	7–3	4–1
AUB	17–13	1–2	0–3		1–2	2–1	.	2–1	2–1	3–0	3–0	2–1	.	1–2	.	AUB	W3	6–4	2–1
FLA	20–10	2–1	.	2–1		2–1	2–1	.	.	3–0	3–0	0–3	2–1	1–2	3–0	FLA	E1	8–2	3–1
UGA	11–19	.	3–0	1–2	1–2		2–1	1–2	.	0–3	1–2	0–3	2–1	.	0–3	UGA	E6	3–7	1–3
KEN	16–14	2–1	.	.	1–2	1–2		1–2	3–0	3–0	.	3–0	1–2	1–2	0–3	KEN	E5	4–6	3–1
LSU	19–10	3–0	2–1	1–2	.	2–1	2–1		1–2	.	3–0	1–1	2–1	2–1	.	LSU	W2	7–2	2–0
MSU	9–21	2–1	0–3	1–2	.	.	0–3	2–1		.	2–1	1–2	0–3	1–2	0–3	MSU	W6	3–7	0–4
MIZZ	10–20	0–3	.	0–3	0–3	3–0	0–3	.	.		2–1	0–3	3–0	1–2	1–2	MIZZ	E7	3–7	2–5
MISS	6–24	0–3	1–2	0–3	0–3	2–1	.	0–3	1–2	1–2		.	.	1–2	0–3	MISS	W7	1–9	0–5
SCAR	16–13	.	1–2	1–2	3–0	3–0	0–3	1–1	2–1	3–0	.		1–2	.	1–2	SCAR	E3	4–5	3–1
TENN	16–14	.	0–3	.	1–2	1–2	2–1	1–2	3–0	0–3	.	2–1		3–0	3–0	TENN	E4	5–5	3–2
TAMU	14–16	1–2	0–3	2–1	2–1	.	2–1	1–2	2–1	2–1	2–1	.	0–3		.	TAMU	W5	6–4	0–2
VAN	19–11	1–2	2–1	.	0–3	3–0	3–0	.	3–0	2–1	3–0	2–1	0–3	.		VAN	E2	7–3	4–2
Team	W–L	ALA	ARK	AUB	FLA	UGA	KEN	LSU	MSU	MIZZ	MISS	SCAR	TENN	TAMU	VAN	Team	Div	SR	SW

Updated for entire regular season. Tiebrkrs: FLA>ARK VAN common. KEN&TENN>ALA LSU common. TENN>KEN hd–hd.

== Rankings ==
Ranking movements Legend: ██ Increase in ranking ██ Decrease in ranking т = Tied with team above or below ( ) = First-place votes
	Week																		
Poll	Pre	1	2	3	4	5	6	7	8	9	10	11	12	13	14	15	16	17	Final
Coaches'	5	5*	6	6	4	3	3	3	3 (2)	3 (2)	4	3	5	2 (1)	2 (1)	2	2*	2*	2
Baseball America	3	2	2	2	2	2	2	2	2	2	4	5	7	3	2	2	2*	2*	2
Collegiate Baseball^	2	2	3	7	6	7	5	6	6	5	8	6	8	4	3	2	2	2	2
NCBWA†	4	3	2	6	3	2	2	3	2т	3	4	3	6	3	2	2	2	2*	2
D1Baseball	7	7	6	6	5	3	3	3	3	3	4	4	7	4	2	2	2*	2*	2

^ Collegiate Baseball ranked 40 teams in their preseason poll, but only ranked 30 teams weekly during the season.
† NCBWA ranks 30 teams in their preseason poll, but only ranks 25 teams weekly during the season.
* A new poll was not released for this week, so for comparison purposes, the previous week's ranking is inserted in this week's slot.
