= 2023 LSU Tigers baseball team =

2023 season of Louisiana State University baseball team

2023 LSU Tigers baseball

Baton Rouge Regional champions Baton Rouge Super Regional champions

College World Series National champions
- Conference: Southeastern Conference
- Western Division
- Record: 54–17 (19–10 SEC)
- Head coach: Jay Johnson (2nd season)
- Assistant coaches: Wes Johnson; Josh Jordan; Marc Wanaka
- Home stadium: Alex Box Stadium

2023 Southeastern Conference baseball standings
	Conf.						Overall
Team	W		L		T	PCT	W		L		T	PCT
Eastern
No. 2 Florida ^{x}‍†‍‍^{y}	20	–	10	–	0	.667	54	–	17	–	0	.761
No. 19 Vanderbilt ‍‍‡‍^{y}	19	–	11	–	0	.633	42	–	20	–	0	.677
No. 13 South Carolina ‍‍‍^{y}	16	–	13	–	0	.552	42	–	21	–	0	.667
No. 7 Tennessee ‍‍‍^{y}	16	–	14	–	0	.533	44	–	22	–	0	.667
No. 17 Kentucky ‍‍‍^{y}	16	–	14	–	0	.533	40	–	21	–	0	.656
Georgia ‍‍‍	11	–	19	–	0	.367	29	–	27	–	0	.518
Missouri ‍‍‍	10	–	20	–	0	.333	30	–	24	–	0	.556
Western
No. 16 Arkansas ^{x}‍†‍‍^{y}	20	–	10	–	0	.667	43	–	18	–	0	.705
No. 1 LSU ‍‍‍^{y}	19	–	10	–	0	.655	54	–	17	–	0	.761
Auburn ‍‍‍^{y}	17	–	13	–	0	.567	34	–	23	–	1	.595
No. 10 Alabama ‍‍‍^{y}	16	–	14	–	0	.533	43	–	21	–	0	.672
Texas A&M ‍‍‍^{y}	14	–	16	–	0	.467	38	–	27	–	0	.585
Mississippi State ‍‍‍	9	–	21	–	0	.300	27	–	26	–	0	.509
Ole Miss ‍‍‍	6	–	24	–	0	.200	25	–	29	–	0	.463
x – Division champion † – Conference champion ‡ – Tournament champion y – Invited to the NCAA tournament As of June 26, 2023; Rankings from D1Baseball

The 2023 LSU Tigers baseball team represented Louisiana State University during the 2023 NCAA Division I baseball season. The Tigers played their home games at Alex Box Stadium and won their 7th national championship. The team is viewed by many experts as one of the greatest teams in college baseball history, due to their prolific record, dominating World Series performance, and the several players they had drafted, including the first and second overall picks in the 2024 MLB Draft.Greatest college baseball teams of all time

== Previous season ==
The Tigers finished 40–22, 17–13 in the SEC to finish in second place in the Western division in Jay Johnson’s first season. The Tigers went 1–2 in the 2022 Southeastern Conference baseball tournament. The Tigers were seeded second in the Hattiesburg Regional of the 2022 NCAA Division I baseball tournament, where they finished 2–2 before being eliminated by top regional seed, and 11th overall seed, Southern Miss.

== Preseason ==
=== Preseason SEC awards and honors ===
Outfielder and designated hitter, Dylan Crews and Tommy White, respectively, were named to the All-SEC preseason first-team.

Preseason All-SEC First Team
Player	No.	Position	Class
Dylan Crews	3	OF	Junior
Tommy White	47	DH/U	Sophomore

Preseason All-SEC Second Team
Player	No.	Position	Class
Tre Morgan	18	1B	Junior
Paul Skenes	20	SP	Junior

=== Coaches poll ===
The SEC baseball coaches' poll was released on February 9, 2023.

SEC West Coaches' Poll
Predicted finish	Team	Points
1	LSU	88 (12)
2	Texas A&M	69 (1)
3	Arkansas	68
4	Ole Miss	64 (1)
5	Alabama	34
6	Auburn	33
7	Mississippi State	29

== Offseason ==
=== Transfers ===
Incoming transfers
Name	Number	Pos.	Height	Weight	Year	Hometown	Previous school
Ben Nippolt	5	INF	5 ft 11 in (1.80 m)	173	Jr.	St. Paul, Minnesota	VCU
Paul Skenes	20	RHP/U	6 ft 6 in (1.98 m)	247	Jr.	Lake Forest, California	Air Force
Thatcher Hurd	26	3B	6 ft 4 in (1.93 m)	214	So.	Manhattan Beach, California	UCLA
Nate Ackenhausen	30	RHP	6 ft 2 in (1.88 m)	240	Jr.	Owasso, Oklahoma	Eastern Oklahoma State
Kaleb Applebey	45	RHP	6 ft 7 in (2.01 m)	245	So.	Mount Carmel, Illinois	Wabash Valley CC
Tommy White	47	3B	6 ft 0 in (1.83 m)	236	So.	St. Pete Beach, Florida	NC State
Jack Merrifield	53	3B	6 ft 2 in (1.88 m)	195	RS-Sr.	Prairieville, Louisiana	LSU Eunice
Christian Little	99	RHP	6 ft 4 in (1.93 m)	225	Jr.	St. Louis, Missouri	Vanderbilt

=== Signing Day recruits ===
The following players signed National Letter of Intents to play for LSU in 2023.

Player	Hometown	High school
Pitchers
Nic Bronzini	San Ramon, California	Cal High
Micah Bucknam	Abbotsford, British Columbia	MEI
Griffin Herring	Southlake, Texas	Southlake Carroll
Aiden Moffett	Mount Olive, Mississippi	Taylorsville (MS)
Jaden Noot	Oak Park, California	Sierra Canyon
Chase Shores	Midland, Texas	Legacy (TX)
DJ Primeaux	Baton Rouge, Louisiana	Central (LA)
Hitters
Jared Jones	Marietta, Georgia	George Walton
Gavin Guidry	Lake Charles, Louisiana	Alfred Barbe
Ethan Frey	Leesville, Louisiana	Rosepine
Brady Neal	Tallahassee, Florida	IMG Academy
Mic Paul	Salt Lake City, Utah	Olympus
Paxton Kling	Roaring Spring, Pennsylvania	Central (PA)
Zeb Ruddell	Monroe, Louisiana	Neville

=== 2022 MLB draft ===
Four LSU players were drafted in the 2022 MLB draft.

Round	Pick	Player	Position	MLB team
1	6	Jacob Berry	3B	Miami Marlins
2	78	Cade Doughty	2B	Toronto Blue Jays
5	160	Eric Reyzelman	RHP	New York Yankees
12	359	Paul Gervase	RHP	New York Mets

== Personnel ==
=== Roster ===
2023 LSU Tigers baseball roster
Pitchers: 9 - Ty Floyd - Junior; 14 - Nic Bronzini - Freshman; 17 - Sam Dutton - Sophomore; 20 - Paul Skenes - Junior; 21 - Bryce Collins - (redshirt) Junior; 24 - Thatcher Hurd - Sophomore; 27 - Jaden Noot - Freshman; 29 - Micah Bucknam - Freshman; 30 - Nate Ackenhausen - Junior; 32 - Aiden Moffett - Freshman; 34 - Chase Shores - Freshman; 35 - Griffin Herring - Freshman; 38 - Riley Cooper - Junior; 41 - DJ Primeaux - Freshman; 43 - Garrett Edwards - Junior; 44 - Blake Money - Junior; 45 - Kaleb Applebey - (redshirt) Sophomore; 48 - Will Hellmers - Junior; 49 - Javen Coleman - (redshirt) Sophomore; 50 - Grant Taylor - Sophomore; 99 - Christian Little - Junior	Catchers: 7 - Alex Milazzo - (redshirt) Junior; 16 - Brady Neal - Freshman; 25 - Hayden Travinski - (redshirt) Junior; Infielders: 1 - Gavin Guidry - Freshman; 4 - Jordan Thompson - Junior; 5 - Ben Nippolt - Junior; 18 - Tre' Morgan - Junior; 22 - Jared Jones - Freshman; 24 - Cade Beloso - Graduate; 47 - Tommy White - Sophomore; 53 - Jack Merrifield - Senior	Outfielders: 3 - Dylan Crews - Junior; 6 - Brayden Jobert - (redshirt) Junior; 11 - Josh Pearson - Sophomore; 13 - Mic Paul - Freshman; 23 - Josh Stevenson - Sophomore; 28 - Paxton Kling - Freshman; Utility: 8 - Gavin Dugas - Graduate; 33 - Ethan Frey - Freshman

=== Starters ===
Lineup
Pos.	No.	Player.	Year
C	25	Hayden Travinski	RS Junior
1B	18	Tre' Morgan	Junior
2B	8	Gavin Dugas	Graduate
3B	47	Tommy White	Sophomore
SS	4	Jordan Thompson	Junior
LF	11	Josh Pearson	Sophomore
CF	3	Dylan Crews	Junior
RF	6	Brayden Jobert	RS Junior
DH	24	Cade Beloso	Graduate

Weekend pitching rotation
Day	No.	Player.	Year
Friday	20	Paul Skenes	Junior
Saturday	9	Ty Floyd	Junior
Sunday	24	Thatcher Hurd	Sophomore

== Schedule and results ==
2023 LSU Tigers baseball game log (54–17)
Regular season (42–13)

February (7–1)
Date	Opponent	Rank	Site/stadium	Score	Win	Loss	Save	TV	Attendance	Overall record	SEC record
February 17	Western Michigan*	No. 1	Alex Box Stadium; Baton Rouge, LA	**W** 10–0	**Skenes** (1–0)	Miller (0–1)	None	SECN+	10,683	1–0	—
February 18	Western Michigan*	No. 1	Alex Box Stadium	**W** 5–3	**Cooper** (1–0)	Armbrustmacher (0–1)	**Ackenhausen** (1)	SECN	10,312	2–0	—
February 19	Western Michigan*	No. 1	Alex Box Stadium	**W** 9–2	**Floyd** (1–0)	Thelen (0–1)	None	SECN+	10,403	3–0	—
February 21	Southern*	No. 1	Alex Box Stadium	**W** 18–4^{7}	**Little** (1–0)	Harris (0–1)	None	SECN+	10,806	4–0	—
Round Rock Classic
February 24	vs. Kansas State*	No. 1	Dell Diamond; Round Rock, TX	**W** 7–3	**Skenes** (2–0)	Ruhl (1–1)	**Floyd** (1)	SECN+	5,020	5–0	—
February 25	vs. Iowa*	No. 1	Dell Diamond	**L** 4–12	Simpson (1–0)	**Cooper** (1–1)	None	SECN+	7,214	5–1	—
February 26	vs. Sam Houston State*	No. 1	Dell Diamond	**W** 16–4	**Edwards** (1–0)	Hewitt (1–1)	None	SECN+	5,023	6–1	—
February 28	at Texas*	No. 1	UFCU Disch–Falk Field; Austin, TX	**W** 3–0	**Ackenhausen** (1–0)	Stuart (1–1)	**Little** (1)	SECN+	7,641	7–1	—

March (17–2)
Date	Opponent	Rank	Site/stadium	Score	Win	Loss	Save	TV	Attendance	Overall record	SEC record
March 3	Butler*	No. 1	Alex Box Stadium	**W** 12–2	**Skenes** (3–0)	Graverson (0–1)	None	SECN+	11,282	8–1	—
March 4	Central Connecticut*	No. 1	Alex Box Stadium	**W** 26–4^{7}	**Floyd** (2–0)	Reyes (0–1)	None	SECN+	11,020	9–1	—
March 5	Central Connecticut*	No. 1	Alex Box Stadium	**W** 13–0^{7}	**Ackenhausen** (2–0)	Neuman (0–1)	None	SECN+	10,354	10–1	—
March 6	Butler*	No. 1	Alex Box Stadium	**W** 11–0^{7}	**Hurd** (1–0)	Barokas (1–1)	None	SECN+	9,782	11–1	—
March 8	Lamar*	No. 1	Alex Box Stadium	**W** 9–2	**Little** (2–0)	Waterhouse (1–1)	**Edwards** (1)	SECN+	10,020	12–1	—
March 10	Samford*	No. 1	Alex Box Stadium	**W** 11–1^{7}	**Skenes** (4–0)	Cravey (1–2)	None	SECN+	10,205	13–1	—
March 11	Samford*	No. 1	Alex Box Stadium	**W** 12–0^{7}	**Floyd** (3–0)	Westbrooks (0–1)	None	SECN+	11,010	14–1	—
March 12	Samford*	No. 1	Alex Box Stadium	**W** 13–1^{7}	**Hurd** (2–0)	Lynch (0–2)	None	SECN+	10,422	15–1	—
March 14	New Orleans*	No. 1	Alex Box Stadium	**W** 16–0	**Edwards** (2–0)	Mercer (2–1)	None	SECN+	10,257	16–1	—
March 17	at No. 11 Texas A&M	No. 1	Blue Bell Park; College Station, TX	**W** 9–0	**Skenes** (5–0)	Dettmer (1–2)	**Little** (1)	SECN	6,172	17–1	1–0
March 18	at No. 11 Texas A&M	No. 1	Blue Bell Park	**W** 12–7	**Edwards** (3–0)	Dillard (0–2)	None	SECN+	6,267	18–1	2–0
March 19	at No. 11 Texas A&M	No. 1	Blue Bell Park	**L** 6–8	Johnston (2–0)	**Little** (2–1)	None	SECN+	6,114	18–2	2–1
March 21	Central Arkansas*	No. 1	Alex Box Stadium	**W** 10–4	**Herring** (1–0)	Janak (0–1)	None	SECN+	9,906	19–2	—
March 24	No. 6 Arkansas	No. 1	Alex Box Stadium	**L** 3–9^{10}	Smith (4–0)	**Shores (0–1)**	None	SECN+	11,216	19–3	2–2
March 25	No. 6 Arkansas	No. 1	Alex Box Stadium	**W** 12–2^{7}	**Floyd** (4–0)	McEntire (4–1)	None	SECN	11,857	20–3	3–2
March 26	No. 6 Arkansas	No. 1	Alex Box Stadium	**W** 14–5	**Herring** (2–0)	Morris (0–1)	None	ESPN2	12,073	21–3	4–2
March 28	Grambling State*	No. 1	Alex Box Stadium	**W** 17–5^{7}	**Money** (1–0)	Boudreaux (0–2)	None	SECN+	9,734	22–3	—
March 30	No. 10 Tennessee	No. 1	Alex Box Stadium	**W** 5–4	**Edwards** (4–0)	Halvorsen (2–2)	None	ESPNU	13,608	23–3	5–2
March 31	No. 10 Tennessee	No. 1	Alex Box Stadium	**W** 6–4	**Floyd** (5–0)	Burns (2–2)	**Herring** (1)	SECN	12,551	24–3	6–2

April (7–4)
Date	Opponent	Rank	Site/stadium	Score	Win	Loss	Save	TV	Attendance	Overall record	SEC record
April 1	No. 10 Tennessee	No. 1	Alex Box Stadium	**L** 7–14	Sewell (2–0)	**Hurd** (2–1)	None	SECN+	11,805	24–4	6–3
April 4	Nicholls*	No. 1	Alex Box Stadium	**W** 12–2^{7}	**Guidry** (1–0)	Poirrier (0–1)	None	SECN+	10,544	25–4	—
April 6	at No. 6 South Carolina	No. 1	Founders Park; Columbia, SC	**L** 5–13	Hicks (6–0)	**Skenes** (5–1)	None	SECN+	8,242	25–5	6–4
April 7	at No. 6 South Carolina	No. 1	Founders Park	**W** 8–7	**Guidry** (2–0)	Jones (4–1)	None	SECN+	8,242	26–5	7–4
April 8	at No. 6 South Carolina	No. 1	Founders Park	**Canceled (inclement weather)**						26–5	7–4
April 11	at Tulane*	No. 1	Turchin Stadium; New Orleans, LA	**W** 11–5	**Collins** (1–0)	Wachter (1–3)	None	ESPN+	5,000	27–5	—
April 13	No. 12 Kentucky	No. 1	Alex Box Stadium	**W** 16–6^{8}	**Skenes** (6–1)	Hise (1–1)	None	SECN	11,061	28–5	8–4
April 14	No. 12 Kentucky	No. 1	Alex Box Stadium	**L** 10–13	**Williams** (3–0)	**Herring** (2–1)	Giles (1)	SECN+	11,675	28–6	8–5
April 15	No. 12 Kentucky	No. 1	Alex Box Stadium	**W** 7–6	**Collins** (2–0)	Lee (3–2)	None	SECN+	10,912	29–6	9–5
April 18	Louisiana*	No. 1	Alex Box Stadium	**L** 5–8	Christie (1–0)	**Cooper** (1–2)	None	SECN+	11,784	29–7	—
April 21	at Ole Miss	No. 1	Swayze Field; Oxford, MS	**W** 7–3	**Skenes** (7–1)	Rivas (5–3)	**Herring** (1)	SECN+	10,683	30–7	10–5
April 22	at Ole Miss	No. 1	Swayze Field	**W** 8–4	**Floyd** (6–0)	Elliott (1–1)	None	ESPN2	11,661	31–7	11–5
April 23	at Ole Miss	No. 1	Swayze Field	**W** 7–6	**Cooper** (2–2)	Murrell (2–2)	None	SECN+	10,557	32–7	12–5
April 25	Nicholls*	No. 1	Alex Box Stadium	**L** 5–6	Saltaformaggio (3–1)	**Collins** (2–1)	Evans (1)	SECN+	10,204	32–8	—
April 28	Alabama	No. 1	Alex Box Stadium	**W** 8–6	**Skenes** (8–1)	Banks (1–1)	**Collins** (1)	SECN	12,117	33–8	13–5
April 29	Alabama	No. 1	Alex Box Stadium	**W** 12–8	**Coleman** (1–0)	Davis II (0–1)	**Hurd** (1)	SECN+	12,078	34–8	14–5
April 30	Alabama	No. 1	Alex Box Stadium	**W** 13–11	**Cooper** (3–2)	Hoopes (1–1)	None	SECN+	11,505	35–8	15–5

May (7–5)
Date	Opponent	Rank	Site/stadium	Score	Win	Loss	Save	TV	Attendance	Overall record	SEC record
May 2	at Southeastern Louisiana*	No. 1	Pat Kenelly Diamond; Hammond, LA	**W** 10–0^{7}	**Guidry** (3–0)	Guth (0–1)	None	ESPN+	3,214	36–8	—
May 5	at Auburn	No. 1	Plainsman Park; Auburn, AL	**W** 3–0	**Skenes** (9–1)	Allsup (0–1)	**Hurd** (2)	SECN+	4,096	37–8	16–5
May 6	at Auburn	No. 1	Plainsman Park	**L** 6–8	Crotchfelt (1–2)	**Coleman** (1–1)	Cannon (1)	SECN	4,096	37–9	16–6
May 7	at Auburn	No. 1	Plainsman Park	**L** 2–12	Herberholz (1–3)	**Little** (2–2)	Nelson (1)	SECN+	4,096	37–10	16–7
May 9	Northwestern State*	No. 2	Alex Box Stadium	**W** 14–4^{7}	**Hurd** (3–1)	Francis E. (1–1)	None	SECN+	10,262	38–10	—
May 12	Mississippi State	No. 2	Alex Box Stadium	**W** 12–1^{7}	**Skenes** (10–1)	Siary (1–2)	None	SECN	12,304	39–10	17–7
May 13	Mississippi State	No. 2	Alex Box Stadium	**L** 4–9	Hunt (2–2)	**Hurd** (3–2)	None	SECN+	11,904	39–11	17–8
May 14	Mississippi State	No. 2	Alex Box Stadium	**L** 13–14	Nixon (2–1)	**Cooper** (3–3)	None	SECN+	11,002	39–12	17–9
May 16	McNeese*	No. 5	Alex Box Stadium	**W** 7–4	**Herring** (3–1)	Barthelemy (3–1)	**Hurd** (3)	SECN+	10,576	40–12	—
May 18	at Georgia	No. 5	Foley Field; Athens, GA	**W** 8–5^{12}	**Hurd** (4–2)	Marsh (1–3)	None	SECN+	3,088	41–12	18–9
May 19	at Georgia	No. 5	Foley Field	**W** 8–4	**Floyd** (7–0)	Goldstein (3–2)	None	SECN+	3,725	42–12	19–9
May 20	at Georgia	No. 5	Foley Field	**L** 5–9	Sullivan, L (5–2)	**Coleman** (1–2)	Crisp (2)	SECN+	3,789	42–13	19–10

Postseason (12–4)

SEC Tournament (1–2)
Date	Opponent	Seed	Site/stadium	Score	Win	Loss	Save	TV	Attendance	Overall record	SECT Record
May 24	vs. No. 22 (6) South Carolina	No. 5 (3)	Hoover Metropolitan Stadium; Hoover, AL	**W** 10–3	**Hurd** (5–2)	Jones (4–5)	**Ackenhausen** (2)	SECN	–	43–13	1–0
May 25	vs. No. 3 (2) Arkansas	No. 5 (3)	Hoover Metropolitan Stadium	**L** 4–5	Hollan (8–2)	**Skenes** (10–2)	None	SECN	–	43–14	1–1
May 26	vs. (10) Texas A&M	No. 5 (3)	Hoover Metropolitan Stadium	**L** 4–5	Aschenbeck (8–1)	**Herring** (3–2)	None	SECN	–	43–15	1–2

NCAA tournament – Baton Rouge Regional (3–0)
Date	Opponent	Seed/Rank	Site/stadium	Score	Win	Loss	Save	TV	Attendance	Overall record	NCAAT record
June 2	(4) Tulane	No. 7 (5)	Alex Box Stadium	**W** 7–2	**Skenes** (11–2)	D. Carmouche (5–9)	None	ESPNU	11,837	44–15	1–0
June 4	(2) Oregon State	No. 7 (5)	Alex Box Stadium	**W** 6–5	**Hurd** (6–2)	Ferrer (2–2)	**Guidry** (2)	ESPN+	12,431	45–15	2–0
June 5	(2) Oregon State	No. 7 (5)	Alex Box Stadium	**W** 13–7	**Herring** (4–2)	Larson (3–3)	None	ESPN2/ESPN+	11,473	46–15	3–0

NCAA tournament – Baton Rouge Super Regional (2–0)
Date	Opponent	Seed/Rank	Site/stadium	Score	Win	Loss	Save	TV	Attendance	Overall record	NCAAT record
June 10	(12) Kentucky	(5)	Alex Box Stadium	**W** 14–0	**Skenes** (12–2)	Z. Lee (5–4)	None	ESPN+	12,452	47–15	1–0
June 11	(12) Kentucky	(5)	Alex Box Stadium	**W** 8–3	**Cooper** (4–3)	A Strickland (4–2)	**Guidry** (3)	ESPN2	12,640	48–15	2–0

College World Series (6–2)
Date	Opponent	Seed/Rank	Site/stadium	Score	Win	Loss	Save	TV	Attendance	Overall record	NCAAT record
June 17	vs. No. 21 Tennessee	No. 7 (5)	Charles Schwab Field; Omaha, NE	**W** 6–3	**Skenes** (13–2)	Lindsey (3–4)	**Cooper** (1)	ESPN+	25,010	49–15	1–0
June 19	vs. (1) Wake Forest	No. 7 (5)	Charles Schwab Field	**L** 2–3	Minacci (1–1)	**Hurd** (6–3)	None	ESPN	24,958	49–16	1–1
June 20	vs. No. 21 Tennessee	No. 7 (5)	Charles Schwab Field	**W** 5–0	**Ackenhausen** (3–0)	Beam (9–5)	**Cooper** (2)	ESPN	24,874	50–16	2–1
June 21	vs. (1) Wake Forest	No. 7 (5)	Charles Schwab Field	**W** 5–2	**Herring** (5–2)	Keener (8–2)	**Cooper** (3)	ESPN	25,214	51–16	3–1
June 22	vs. (1) Wake Forest	No. 7 (5)	Charles Schwab Field	**W** 2–0^{11}	**Hurd** (7–3)	Massey (3–1)	None	ESPN2	25,214	52–16	4–1
June 24	vs. (2) Florida	No. 7 (5)	Charles Schwab Field	**W** 4–3^{11}	**Cooper** (5–3)	Neely (2–3)	None	ESPN	25,258	53–16	5–1
June 25	vs. (2) Florida	No. 7 (5)	Charles Schwab Field	**L** 4–24	Purnell (2–0)	**Ackenhausen** (3–1)	Ficarrotta (2)	ESPN	25,292	53–17	5–2
June 26	vs. (2) Florida	No. 7 (5)	Charles Schwab Field	**W** 18–4	**Hurd** (8–3)	Caglianone (7–4)	None	ESPN	24,878	54–17	6–2

*Denotes non–conference game • Schedule source • Rankings based on the teams' current ranking in the D1Baseball poll
**W** LSU win • **L** LSU loss • Postponement or cancellation • **Bold** denotes LSU player

== Statistics ==
=== Record vs. conference opponents ===
Last two do not qualify for conf. tourn. Blank are not scheduled. Blue are home games, otherwise away.

2023 SEC baseball records Source: 2023 SEC baseball game results, 2023 SEC baseball schedule
Team	W–L	ALA	ARK	AUB	FLA	UGA	KEN	LSU	MSU	MIZZ	MISS	SCAR	TENN	TAMU	VAN	Team	Div	SR	SW
ALA	16–14		1–2	2–1	1–2	.	1–2	0–3	1–2	3–0	3–0	.	.	2–1	2–1	ALA	W4	5–5	2–1
ARK	20–10	2–1		3–0	.	0–3	.	1–2	3–0	.	2–1	2–1	3–0	3–0	1–2	ARK	W1	7–3	4–1
AUB	17–13	1–2	0–3		1–2	2–1	.	2–1	2–1	3–0	3–0	2–1	.	1–2	.	AUB	W3	6–4	2–1
FLA	20–10	2–1	.	2–1		2–1	2–1	.	.	3–0	3–0	0–3	2–1	1–2	3–0	FLA	E1	8–2	3–1
UGA	11–19	.	3–0	1–2	1–2		2–1	1–2	.	0–3	1–2	0–3	2–1	.	0–3	UGA	E6	3–7	1–3
KEN	16–14	2–1	.	.	1–2	1–2		1–2	3–0	3–0	.	3–0	1–2	1–2	0–3	KEN	E5	4–6	3–1
LSU	19–10	3–0	2–1	1–2	.	2–1	2–1		1–2	.	3–0	1–1	2–1	2–1	.	LSU	W2	7–2	2–0
MSU	9–21	2–1	0–3	1–2	.	.	0–3	2–1		.	2–1	1–2	0–3	1–2	0–3	MSU	W6	3–7	0–4
MIZZ	10–20	0–3	.	0–3	0–3	3–0	0–3	.	.		2–1	0–3	3–0	1–2	1–2	MIZZ	E7	3–7	2–5
MISS	6–24	0–3	1–2	0–3	0–3	2–1	.	0–3	1–2	1–2		.	.	1–2	0–3	MISS	W7	1–9	0–5
SCAR	16–13	.	1–2	1–2	3–0	3–0	0–3	1–1	2–1	3–0	.		1–2	.	1–2	SCAR	E3	4–5	3–1
TENN	16–14	.	0–3	.	1–2	1–2	2–1	1–2	3–0	0–3	.	2–1		3–0	3–0	TENN	E4	5–5	3–2
TAMU	14–16	1–2	0–3	2–1	2–1	.	2–1	1–2	2–1	2–1	2–1	.	0–3		.	TAMU	W5	6–4	0–2
VAN	19–11	1–2	2–1	.	0–3	3–0	3–0	.	3–0	2–1	3–0	2–1	0–3	.		VAN	E2	7–3	4–2
Team	W–L	ALA	ARK	AUB	FLA	UGA	KEN	LSU	MSU	MIZZ	MISS	SCAR	TENN	TAMU	VAN	Team	Div	SR	SW

Updated for entire regular season. Tiebrkrs: FLA>ARK VAN common. KEN&TENN>ALA LSU common. TENN>KEN hd–hd.

== Rankings ==
Ranking movements
	Week																			
Poll	Pre	1	2	3	4	5	6	7	8	9	10	11	12	13	14	15	16	17	18	Final
Coaches'	1	1*	1	1	1	1	1	1	1	1	1	1								
Baseball America	1	1	1	1	1	1	1	1	1	1	1	1								
Collegiate Baseball^	1	1	1	1	1	1	1	1	1	1	1	1								
NCBWA†	1	1	1	1	1	1	1	1	1	1	1	1								
D1Baseball	1	1	1	1	1	1	1	1	1	1	1	1								

^ Collegiate Baseball ranked 40 teams in their preseason poll, but only ranked 30 teams weekly during the season.
† NCBWA ranks 30 teams in their preseason poll, but only ranks 25 teams weekly during the season.
* A new poll was not released for this week, so for comparison purposes, the previous week's ranking is inserted in this week's slot.
