= 2023 Missouri Tigers baseball team =

Season of a college baseball team

2023 Missouri Tigers baseball
- Conference: Southeastern Conference
- Eastern Division
- Record: 30–24 (10–20 SEC)
- Head coach: Steve Bieser (7th season)
- Assistant coaches: Jason Hagerty (hitting); Ricky Meinhold (pitching); Tyler Packanik
- Home stadium: Taylor Stadium

2023 Southeastern Conference baseball standings
| | Conf. | | | | | | Overall |
| Team | W | | L | | T | PCT | W | | L | | T | PCT |
|---|---|---|---|---|---|---|---|---|---|---|---|---|
Eastern
| No. 2 Florida ^{x}‍†‍‍^{y} | 20 | – | 10 | – | 0 | .667 | 54 | – | 17 | – | 0 | .761 |
| No. 19 Vanderbilt ‍‍‡‍^{y} | 19 | – | 11 | – | 0 | .633 | 42 | – | 20 | – | 0 | .677 |
| No. 13 South Carolina ‍‍‍^{y} | 16 | – | 13 | – | 0 | .552 | 42 | – | 21 | – | 0 | .667 |
| No. 7 Tennessee ‍‍‍^{y} | 16 | – | 14 | – | 0 | .533 | 44 | – | 22 | – | 0 | .667 |
| No. 17 Kentucky ‍‍‍^{y} | 16 | – | 14 | – | 0 | .533 | 40 | – | 21 | – | 0 | .656 |
| Georgia ‍‍‍ | 11 | – | 19 | – | 0 | .367 | 29 | – | 27 | – | 0 | .518 |
| Missouri ‍‍‍ | 10 | – | 20 | – | 0 | .333 | 30 | – | 24 | – | 0 | .556 |
Western
| No. 16 Arkansas ^{x}‍†‍‍^{y} | 20 | – | 10 | – | 0 | .667 | 43 | – | 18 | – | 0 | .705 |
| No. 1 LSU ‍‍‍^{y} | 19 | – | 10 | – | 0 | .655 | 54 | – | 17 | – | 0 | .761 |
| Auburn ‍‍‍^{y} | 17 | – | 13 | – | 0 | .567 | 34 | – | 23 | – | 1 | .595 |
| No. 10 Alabama ‍‍‍^{y} | 16 | – | 14 | – | 0 | .533 | 43 | – | 21 | – | 0 | .672 |
| Texas A&M ‍‍‍^{y} | 14 | – | 16 | – | 0 | .467 | 38 | – | 27 | – | 0 | .585 |
| Mississippi State ‍‍‍ | 9 | – | 21 | – | 0 | .300 | 27 | – | 26 | – | 0 | .509 |
| Ole Miss ‍‍‍ | 6 | – | 24 | – | 0 | .200 | 25 | – | 29 | – | 0 | .463 |
x – Division champion † – Conference champion ‡ – Tournament champion y – Invited to the NCAA tournament As of June 26, 2023; Rankings from D1Baseball

The 2023 Missouri Tigers baseball team represented the University of Missouri in the 2023 NCAA Division I baseball season. The Tigers played their home games at Taylor Stadium.

== Previous season ==
The Tigers finished the season 28–23 overall and 10–20 in conference play. They finished seventh in the Eastern division in the SEC and did not qualify for the SEC tournament or NCAA tournament.

=== 2022 MLB draft ===
The Tigers had 5 players drafted in the 2022 MLB draft.

| Player | Position | Round | Overall | MLB team |
|---|---|---|---|---|
| Spencer Miles | Pitcher | 4 | 136 | San Francisco Giants |
| Torin Montgomery | 1st base | 14 | 412 | Miami Marlins |
| Joshua Day | Shortstop | 15 | 438 | Arizona Diamondbacks |
| Nathan Landry | Pitcher | 15 | 459 | Boston Red Sox |
| Jackson Lovich | Shortstop | 19 | 569 | New York Mets |
| Drew Garrett | Pitcher | 19 | 572 | Philadelphia Phillies |

- Jackson Lovich was drafted in the 19th round out of high school, but chose to attend Missouri.

== Departures ==
Offseason departures
| Name | Number | Pos. | Height | Weight | Year | Hometown | Notes |
|---|---|---|---|---|---|---|---|
| Dexter Swims | 6 | INF | 5’10” | 180 lbs | Junior | St. Louis, MO | Transferred to Memphis |
| Mike Coletta | 2 | C | 5’11” | 200 lbs | Senior | Flushing, NY | Graduated |
| Nander De Sedas | 4 | INF | 6’2” | 200 lbs | Junior | Panama City, PR | Transferred to Florida State |
| Garrett Rice | 13 | INF | 6’2” | 240 lbs | Sophomore | Willard, MO | Transferred to Missouri Southern State |
| Shea McGahan | 18 | C | 6’0” | 185 lbs | Freshman | St. Louis, MO | Transferred to Johnson County Community College |
| Jacob Kush | 20 | P | 5’10” | 175 lbs | Senior | Guelph, ON | Transferred to Austin Peay |
| Holden Phelps | 37 | P | 6’6” | 195 lbs | Sophomore | Crystal Lake, IL | Transferred to Pittsburgh |
| Shane Wilhelm | 39 | P | 5’10” | 190 lbs | Junior | Columbia, IL | Transferred to Southern Illinois |
| Zach Hise | 41 | P | 6’5” | 210 lbs | Sophomore | Joliet, IL | Transferred to Kentucky |
| Trae Robertson | 48 | P | 6’5” | 190 lbs | Senior | Columbia, MO | Transferred to Kansas State |

== Transfer in ==
Offseason transfers in
| Name | Number | Pos. | Height | Weight | Year | Hometown | Notes |
|---|---|---|---|---|---|---|---|
| Dylan Leach | 2 | Catcher | 6’0” | 215 lbs | Junior | Carthage, TX | Transferred from Arkansas |
| Matt Garcia | 4 | INF | 6’0” | 190 lbs | Senior | Orlando, FL | Transferred from Bethune–Cookman |
| Brock Daniels | 5 | INF/OF | 6’1” | 181 lbs | Sophomore | St. Louis, MO | Transferred from Oklahoma |
| Ririk Maltrud | 13 | P | 6’4” | 223 lbs | Senior | Austin, TX | Transferred from New Mexico State |
| Cam Chick | 6 | INF/OF | 5’9” | 179 lbs | RS-Senior | Columbia, MO | Transferred from Nebraska |
| Chandler Murphy | 22 | P | 6’3” | 203 lbs | Senior | Peoria, AZ | Transferred from Arizona |
| Javyn Pimental | 43 | P | 6’3” | 213 lbs | Junior | Kaneohe, HI | Transferred from Arizona |

== Incoming Recruits ==
Missouri recruits
| Name | B/T | Pos. | Height | Weight | Hometown | High school | Source |
|---|---|---|---|---|---|---|---|
| Samuel Horn | R/R | SS | 6’4” | 200 lbs | Lawrenceville, GA | Collins Hill High School | |
| Jackson Lovich | R/R | SS | 6’4” | 190 lbs | Overland Park, KS | Blue Valley West High School | |
| Logan Lunceford | R/R | P | 6’0” | 170 lbs | Harrah, OK | Edmond Santa Fe High School | |
| Jordan Austin | L/L | OF | 5’11” | 160 lbs | Lees Summit, MO | Blue Springs South High School | |
| Dalton Bargo | L/R | C | 6’1” | 190 lbs | Omaha, NE | Westside High School | |
| Israel Delgado | S/R | C | 5’11” | 185 lbs | Orland Park, IL | Carl Sandburg High School | |
| Aiden Heberlie | R/R | OF | 6’3” | 195 lbs | Ste. Genevieve, MO | Valle Catholic High School | |
| Tucker Moore | S/R | C | 6’2” | 192 lbs | Castle Rock, CO | Douglas County High School | |
| Jack Mosh | L/R | SS | 5’10” | 170 lbs | Kansas City, MO | Saint Pius X Catholic High School | |
| Peyton Nelson | R/R | SS | 6’0” | 165 lbs | Little Rock, AR | Joe T. Robinson High School | |
| Nic Smith | L/L | P | 6’3” | 190 lbs | Jamestown, TN | Alvin C. York Institute | |
| Bobby Walker | R/R | OF | 6’1” | 185 lbs | Ozark, AR | Paris High School | |
| Gage Watson | L/L | P | 6’3” | 165 lbs | Crawfordsville, AR | Marion High School | |
| Andrew Lyons | R/R | 3B | 6’1” | 207 lbs | Granite City, IL | Granite City High School | |
| Cameron Haag | R/R | SS | 6’0” | 160 lbs | Trenton, IL | Mater Dei High School | |

== Personnel ==
=== Roster ===
2023 Missouri Tigers baseball team
Players
Coaches

| # | Pos. | Name | B/T | Height | Weight | Year | Home town |
|---|---|---|---|---|---|---|---|
| 1 | OF | Juju Stevens | R/R | 6 ft 0 in (1.83 m) | 175 lb (79 kg) | So | Woodbridge, CT |
| 2 | C | Dylan Leach | S/R | 6 ft 0 in (1.83 m) | 215 lb (98 kg) | Jr | Carthage, TX |
| 3 | C | Tre Morris | R/R | 5 ft 10 in (1.78 m) | 204 lb (93 kg) | RS Sr | Columbia, MO |
| 4 | INF | Matt Garcia | S/R | 6 ft 0 in (1.83 m) | 190 lb (86 kg) | Sr | Orlando, FL |
| 5 | | Brock Daniels | L/R | 6 ft 1 in (1.85 m) | 181 lb (82 kg) | So | St. Louis, MO |
| 6 | | Cam Chick | S/R | 5 ft 9 in (1.75 m) | 179 lb (81 kg) | RS Sr | Columbia, MO |
| 7 | OF | Ross Lovich | L/L | 6 ft 0 in (1.83 m) | 186 lb (84 kg) | Jr | Overland Park, KS |
| 8 | P | Zach Franklin | R/R | 6 ft 1 in (1.85 m) | 198 lb (90 kg) | RS Sr | Marion, NC |
| 9 | | Ty Wilmsmeyer | R/R | 6 ft 1 in (1.85 m) | 180 lb (82 kg) | Sr | Springfield, MO |
| 10 | OF | Jackson Beaman | R/R | 6 ft 1 in (1.85 m) | 230 lb (104 kg) | Jr | Lincoln, MO |
| 11 | INF | Luke Mann | L/R | 6 ft 2 in (1.88 m) | 218 lb (99 kg) | RS Sr | St. Louis, MO |
| 12 | INF | Justin Colon | R/R | 6 ft 3 in (1.91 m) | 168 lb (76 kg) | So | Carolina, PR |
| 13 | P | Rorik Maltrud | R/R | 6 ft 4 in (1.93 m) | 223 lb (101 kg) | RS Sr | Austin, TX |
| 14 | OF | Isaiah Frost | L/L | 5 ft 11 in (1.8 m) | 192 lb (87 kg) | So | Lee's Summit, MO |
| 17 | P | Ben Pedersen | R/R | 6 ft 6 in (1.98 m) | 210 lb (95 kg) | Sr | Duluth, MN |
| 18 | INF | Jackson Lovich | R/R | 6 ft 4 in (1.93 m) | 192 lb (87 kg) | Fr | Overland Park, KS |
| 19 | INF | Trevor Austin | R/R | 5 ft 10 in (1.78 m) | 188 lb (85 kg) | Jr | Jefferson City, MO |
| 21 | INF | Sam Horn | R/R | 5 ft 10 in (1.78 m) | 217 lb (98 kg) | Fr | Lawrenceville, GA |
| 22 | P | Chandler Murphy | L/R | 6 ft 3 in (1.91 m) | 203 lb (92 kg) | Sr | Peoria, AZ |
| 23 | P | Ian Lohse | L/L | 6 ft 0 in (1.83 m) | 199 lb (90 kg) | Jr | St. Louis, MO |
| 25 | P | Austin Troesser | R/R | 6 ft 3 in (1.91 m) | 189 lb (86 kg) | Jr | Loose Creek, MO |
| 26 | P | Jacob Hasty | L/L | 6 ft 2 in (1.88 m) | 230 lb (104 kg) | Sr | Keller, TX |
| 27 | OF | Carlos Peña | L/R | 6 ft 2 in (1.88 m) | 228 lb (103 kg) | So | Bayside, NY |
| 28 | C | Tucker Moore | S/R | 6 ft 1 in (1.85 m) | 198 lb (90 kg) | Fr | Castle Rock, CO |
| 30 | P | Carter Rustad | R/R | 6 ft 4 in (1.93 m) | 194 lb (88 kg) | Sr | Kansas City, MO |
| 35 | P | Daniel Wissler | L/L | 6 ft 2 in (1.88 m) | 173 lb (78 kg) | Fr | O'Fallon, MO |
| 36 | P | Parker Wright | R/R | 6 ft 3 in (1.91 m) | 208 lb (94 kg) | Jr | Columbia, MO |
| 37 | P | Brock Lucas | R/R | 6 ft 3 in (1.91 m) | 229 lb (104 kg) | Fr | St. Elizabeth, MO |
| 38 | P | Bryce Mayer | R/R | 6 ft 3 in (1.91 m) | 210 lb (95 kg) | Jr | Marthasville, MO |
| 40 | INF | Hank Zeisler | L/R | 5 ft 10 in (1.78 m) | 218 lb (99 kg) | RS Sr | Kentfield, CA |
| 41 | P | Nic Smith | L/L | 6 ft 3 in (1.91 m) | 198 lb (90 kg) | Fr | Jamestown, TN |
| 43 | P | Javyn Pimental | L/L | 6 ft 3 in (1.91 m) | 213 lb (97 kg) | Jr | Kaneohe, HI |
| 45 | OF | Aiden Heberlie | R/R | 6 ft 3 in (1.91 m) | 203 lb (92 kg) | Fr | Ste. Genevieve, MO |
| 47 | P | Kyle Potthoff | R/R | 6 ft 5 in (1.96 m) | 218 lb (99 kg) | RS Sr | Chesterfield, MO |
| 48 | P | Logan Lunceford | R/R | 6 ft 0 in (1.83 m) | 180 lb (82 kg) | Fr | Edmond, OK |
| 49 | P | Tony Neubeck | L/L | 6 ft 2 in (1.88 m) | 237 lb (108 kg) | So | Hugo, MN |
| 50 | C | Dalton Bargo | L/R | 6 ft 1 in (1.85 m) | 199 lb (90 kg) | Fr | Omaha, NE |
| 51 | INF | Jack Mosh | L/R | 5 ft 10 in (1.78 m) | 199 lb (90 kg) | Fr | Kansas City, MO |
| 52 | INF | Cam Careswell | L/L | 6 ft 2 in (1.88 m) | 229 lb (104 kg) | So | Lee's Summit, MO |

Head coach

Steve Bieser

Assistant coach(es)

Jason Hagerty
Ricky Meinhold
Tyler Packanik

Legend

- (C) Team captain
- (S) Suspended
- (I) Ineligible
- Injured
- Current redshirt

Roster
Last update: March 24, 2023

=== Coaching staff ===
2023 Missouri Tigers coaching staff
| Name | Position |
|---|---|
| Steve Bieser | Head coach |
| Ricky Meinhold | Pitching Coach |
| Jason Hagerty | Hitting Coach |
| Tyler Packanik | Volunteer Assistant Coach |
| Brian Sharp | Graduate Assistant |

== Schedule and results ==
2023 Missouri Tigers baseball game log
Regular season (30–23)

February (6–2)
| Date | Opponent | Rank | Site/stadium | Score | Win | Loss | Save | TV | Attendance | Overall record | SEC record |
|---|---|---|---|---|---|---|---|---|---|---|---|
| Feb. 17 | vs. Oklahoma State* | | Globe Life Field; Arlington, TX | **L** 3–5 | Blake (1–0) | **Murphy** (0–1) | McLean (1) | FloBaseball.TV | 15,271 | 0–1 | |
| Feb. 18 | vs. Texas* | | Globe Life Field | **W** 6–5 | **Maltrud** (1–0) | Walbridge (0–1) | | FloBaseball.TV | 20,295 | 1–1 | |
| Feb. 19 | vs. TCU* | | Globe Life Field | **W** 9–8 | **Franklin** (1–0) | Wright (0–1) | | FloBaseball.TV | 16,100 | 2–1 | |
| Feb. 23 | FIU* | | Infinity Insurance Park; Miami, FL | **L** 3–4 | McKennitt (1–0) | **Troesser** (0–1) | Knox (1) | | 511 | 2–2 | |
| Feb. 24 | FIU* | | Infinity Insurance Park | **W** 5–2 | **Nuebeck** (1–0) | Santana (0–1) | **Franklin** (1) | | 567 | 3–2 | |
| Feb. 25 | FIU* | | Infinity Insurance Park | **W** 10–4 | **Horn** (1–0) | Tiburcio (0–1) | **Lunceford** (1) | | 512 | 4–2 | |
| Feb. 26 | FIU* | | Infinity Insurance Park | **W** 9–5 | **Wissler** (1–0) | Knox (0–1) | **Troesser** (1) | | 501 | 5–2 | |
| Feb. 28 | Lindenwood* | | Taylor Stadium; Columbia, MO | **W** 17–27 | **Smith** (1–0) | James (0–2) | | | 603 | 6–2 | |

March (13–5)
| Date | Opponent | Rank | Site/stadium | Score | Win | Loss | Save | TV | Attendance | Overall record | SEC record |
|---|---|---|---|---|---|---|---|---|---|---|---|
| Mar. 4 | Texas Southern* | | Taylor Stadium | **W** 8–07 | **Murphy** (1–1) | Deleon (1–1) | | | 1,130 | 7–2 | |
| Mar. 4 | Texas Southern* | | Taylor Stadium | **W** 8–77 | **Franklin** (2–0) | Marquez (0–1) | | | 1,130 | 8–2 | |
| Mar. 5 | Texas Southern* | | Taylor Stadium | **W** 15–7 | **Troesser** (1–1) | Head (1–1) | | | 1,261 | 9–2 | |
| Mar. 7 | Western Illinois* | | Taylor Stadium | **W** 6–0 | **Lunceford** (1–0) | Sampson (0–3) | | | 952 | 10–2 | |
| Mar. 10 | NJIT* | | Taylor Stadium | **W** 6–1 | **Murphy** (2–1) | Fischer (0–3) | | | 931 | 11–2 | |
| Mar. 10 | NJIT* | | Taylor Stadium | **L** 1–2 | Kidd (3–1) | **Loshe** (0–1) | | | 931 | 11–3 | |
| Mar. 12 | NJIT* | | Taylor Stadium | **W** 5–3 | **Franklin** (3–0) | de Jong (0–1) | | | 969 | 12–3 | |
| Mar. 15 | Lamar* | | Taylor Stadium | **W** 10–8 | **Lunceford** (2–0) | Hesseltine (0–1) | **Neubeck** (1) | | 1,075 | 13–3 | |
| Mar. 17 | No. 2 Tennessee | | Taylor Stadium | **W** 9–1 | **Murphy** (3–1) | Dollander (3–2) | **Maltrud** (1) | | 1,761 | 14–3 | 1–0 |
| Mar. 19 | No. 2 Tennessee | | Taylor Stadium | **W** 7–4 | **Franklin** (4–0) | Burns (2–1) | | | 2,764 | 15–3 | 2–0 |
| Mar. 19 | No. 2 Tennessee | | Taylor Stadium | **W** 7–1 | **Troesser** (2–1) | Beam (3–1) | | | 2,764 | 16–3 | 3–0 |
| Mar. 22 | vs. Kansas* | No. 22 | Kauffman Stadium; Kansas City, MO | **W** 8–3 | **Wissler** (2–0) | Hewlett (0–3) | | | 1,522 | 17–3 | |
| Mar. 24 | at No. 11 South Carolina | No. 22 | Founders Park; Columbia, SC | **L** 8–9 | Williamson (1–0) | **Franklin** (4–1) | | SECN | 8,242 | 17–4 | 3–1 |
| Mar. 25 | at No. 11 South Carolina | No. 22 | Founders Park | **L** 1–8 | Hall (5–0) | **Loshe** (0–2) | | | 8,242 | 17–5 | 3–2 |
| Mar. 25 | at No. 11 South Carolina | No. 22 | Founders Park | **L** 4–512 | Becker (2–0) | **Wilmsmeyer** (0–1) | | SECN | 7,019 | 17–6 | 3–3 |
| Mar. 28 | at Illinois* | | GCS Ballpark; Sauget, IL | **W** 6–5 | **Lunceford** (3–0) | Swartz (0–1) | **Franklin** (2) | | 2,389 | 18–6 | |
| Mar. 29 | at Lindenwood* | | Lou Brock Sports Complex; St. Charles, MO | **W** 7–5 | **Brock** (1–0) | Roach (1–1) | **Wissler** (1) | | 402 | 19–6 | |
| Mar. 31 | at No. 18 Kentucky | | Kentucky Proud Park; Lexington, KY | **L** 2–12 | Williams (2–0) | **Troesser** (2–2) | | | 2,018 | 19–7 | 3–4 |

April (5–12)
| Date | Opponent | Rank | Site/stadium | Score | Win | Loss | Save | TV | Attendance | Overall record | SEC record |
|---|---|---|---|---|---|---|---|---|---|---|---|
| Apr. 1 | at No. 18 Kentucky | | Kentucky Proud Park | **L** 0–10 | Bosma (4–1) | **Franklin** (4–2) | | | 3,156 | 19–8 | 3–5 |
| Apr. 2 | at No. 18 Kentucky | | Kentucky Proud Park | **L** 1–3 | Moore (1–0) | **Murphy** (3–2) | Chavez (1) | SECN | 2,646 | 19–9 | 3–6 |
| Apr. 6 | No. 4 Vanderbilt | | Taylor Stadium | **L** 6–7 | Ginther (1–0) | **Lunceford** (3–1) | Maldonado (4) | SECN+ | 1,320 | 19–10 | 3–7 |
| Apr. 7 | No. 4 Vanderbilt | | Taylor Stadium | **W** 5–4 | **Franklin** (5–2) | Hiboki (3–3) | | SECN+ | 1,912 | 20–10 | 4–7 |
| Apr. 8 | No. 4 Vanderbilt | | Taylor Stadium | **L** 0–5 | Futrell (6–0) | **Murphy** (3–3) | | SECN+ | 2,389 | 20–11 | 4–8 |
| Apr. 11 | at Missouri State* | | Hammons Field; Springfield, MO | **W** 10–1 | **Lucas** (2–0) | Tscherter (3–3) | | | 2,787 | 21–11 | |
| Apr. 13 | at Texas A&M | | Olsen Field at Blue Bell Park; College Station, TX | **L** 5–13 | Sdao (1–1) | **Lunceford** (3–2) | | ESPNU | 6,125 | 21–12 | 4–9 |
| Apr. 14 | at Texas A&M | | Olsen Field at Blue Bell Park | **L** 1–13 | Aschenbeck (5–0) | **Maltrud** (1–1) | | | 5,942 | 21–13 | 4–10 |
| Apr. 15 | at Texas A&M | | Olsen Field at Blue Bell Park | **W** 13–5 | **Troesser** (3–2) | Lambert (1–1) | | | 6,820 | 22–13 | 5–10 |
| Apr. 18 | Missouri State* | | Taylor Stadium | **W** 7–6 | **Franklin** (6–2) | Ferguson (1–1) | | | 1,516 | 23–13 | |
| Apr. 21 | Alabama | | Taylor Stadium | **L** 4–6 | Banks (1–0) | **Troesser** (3–3) | Davis II (4) | | 1,934 | 23–14 | 5–11 |
| Apr. 22 | Alabama | | Taylor Stadium | **L** 4–10 | Hoopes (1–0) | **Maltrud** (1–2) | Quick (2) | SECN | 2,822 | 23–15 | 5–12 |
| Apr. 23 | Alabama | | Taylor Stadium | **L** 2–3 | Woods (3–1) | **Lunceford** (3–3) | Davis II (5) | | 1,641 | 23–16 | 5–13 |
| Apr. 26 | SIU Edwardsville* | | Roy E. Lee Field at Simmons Baseball Complex; Edwardsville, IL | **W** 8–3 | **Lucas** (3–0) | Smith (0–2) | | | 308 | 24–16 | |
| Apr. 28 | at No. 4 Florida | | Condron Ballpark; Gainesville, FL | **L** 1–11 | Sproat (6–2) | **Murphy** (3–4) | | | 5,516 | 24–17 | 5–14 |
| Apr. 29 | at No. 4 Florida | | Condron Ballpark | **L** 7–11 | Slater (6–0) | **Franklin** (6–3) | Neely (6) | SECN | 5,546 | 24–18 | 5–15 |
| Apr. 30 | at No. 4 Florida | | Condron Ballpark | **L** – | Fisher (4–0) | **Lunceford** (3–4) | Neely (9) | | 5,698 | 24–19 | 5–16 |

May (6–4)
| Date | Opponent | Rank | Site/stadium | Score | Win | Loss | Save | TV | Attendance | Overall record | SEC record |
|---|---|---|---|---|---|---|---|---|---|---|---|
| May 2 | Kansas* | | Taylor Stadium | **W** 9–7 | **Potthoff** (1–0) | Andrews (0–1) | | SECN | 2,582 | 25–19 | |
| May 4 | Ole Miss | | Taylor Stadium | **W** 11–9 | **Troesser** (4–3) | Dougherty (3–4) | | SECN | 1,309 | 26–19 | 6–16 |
| May 5 | Ole Miss | | Taylor Stadium | **W** 13–3 | **Pimental** (1–0) | Quinn (3–2) | | | 1,484 | 27–19 | 7–16 |
| May 6 | Ole Miss | | Taylor Stadium | **L** 14–20 | Nichols (4–4) | **Lunceford** (3–5) | | | 2,077 | 27–20 | 7–17 |
| May 12 | Georgia | | Taylor Stadium | **W** 13–3 | **Murphy** (4–4) | Smith (2–3) | | | 1,383 | 28–20 | 8–17 |
| May 13 | Georgia | | Taylor Stadium | **W** 14–12 | **Troesser** (5–3) | Finley (2–2) | | | 1,846 | 29–20 | 9–17 |
| May 14 | Georgia | | Taylor Stadium | **W** 5–4 | **Potthoff** (2–0) | Rhadans (3–2) | | SECN | 1,447 | 30–20 | 10–17 |
| May 16 | Indiana State* | | Taylor Stadium | **Canceled** | | | | | | | |
| May 18 | at Auburn | | Plainsman Park; Auburn, AL | **L** 0–4 | Allsup (1–1) | **Murphy** (4–5) | Bauman (1) | | 4,096 | 30–21 | 10–18 |
| May 19 | at Auburn | | Plainsman Park | **L** 2–7 | Copeland (4–1) | **Pimental** (1–1) | | | 4,096 | 30–22 | 10–19 |
| May 20 | at Auburn | | Plainsman Park | **L** 7–9 | Cannon (3–1) | **Hasty** (0–1) | | | 4,096 | 30–23 | 10–20 |

Postseason (0–1)

SEC Tournament (0–1)
| Date | Opponent(Seed) | Rank(Seed) | Site/stadium | Score | Win | Loss | Save | TV | Attendance | Overall record | SEC record |
|---|---|---|---|---|---|---|---|---|---|---|---|
| May 23 | No. 19 Auburn (5) | (12) | Hoover Metropolitan Stadium; Hoover, AL | **L** 4–10 | Isbell (3–1) | **Lucas** (3–1) | Crotchfelt (1) | SECN | 10,315 | 30–24 | 0–1 |

Legend: = Win = Loss = Canceled
Bold = Missouri team member
Rankings are based on the team's current ranking in the D1Baseball poll.

== Record vs. conference opponents ==
Last two do not qualify for conf. tourn. Blank are not scheduled. Blue are home games, otherwise away.

2023 SEC baseball records Source: 2023 SEC baseball game results, 2023 SEC baseball schedule
| Team | W–L | ALA | ARK | AUB | FLA | UGA | KEN | LSU | MSU | MIZZ | MISS | SCAR | TENN | TAMU | VAN | Team | Div | SR | SW |
|---|---|---|---|---|---|---|---|---|---|---|---|---|---|---|---|---|---|---|---|
| ALA | 16–14 | | 1–2 | 2–1 | 1–2 | . | 1–2 | 0–3 | 1–2 | 3–0 | 3–0 | . | . | 2–1 | 2–1 | ALA | W4 | 5–5 | 2–1 |
| ARK | 20–10 | 2–1 | | 3–0 | . | 0–3 | . | 1–2 | 3–0 | . | 2–1 | 2–1 | 3–0 | 3–0 | 1–2 | ARK | W1 | 7–3 | 4–1 |
| AUB | 17–13 | 1–2 | 0–3 | | 1–2 | 2–1 | . | 2–1 | 2–1 | 3–0 | 3–0 | 2–1 | . | 1–2 | . | AUB | W3 | 6–4 | 2–1 |
| FLA | 20–10 | 2–1 | . | 2–1 | | 2–1 | 2–1 | . | . | 3–0 | 3–0 | 0–3 | 2–1 | 1–2 | 3–0 | FLA | E1 | 8–2 | 3–1 |
| UGA | 11–19 | . | 3–0 | 1–2 | 1–2 | | 2–1 | 1–2 | . | 0–3 | 1–2 | 0–3 | 2–1 | . | 0–3 | UGA | E6 | 3–7 | 1–3 |
| KEN | 16–14 | 2–1 | . | . | 1–2 | 1–2 | | 1–2 | 3–0 | 3–0 | . | 3–0 | 1–2 | 1–2 | 0–3 | KEN | E5 | 4–6 | 3–1 |
| LSU | 19–10 | 3–0 | 2–1 | 1–2 | . | 2–1 | 2–1 | | 1–2 | . | 3–0 | 1–1 | 2–1 | 2–1 | . | LSU | W2 | 7–2 | 2–0 |
| MSU | 9–21 | 2–1 | 0–3 | 1–2 | . | . | 0–3 | 2–1 | | . | 2–1 | 1–2 | 0–3 | 1–2 | 0–3 | MSU | W6 | 3–7 | 0–4 |
| MIZZ | 10–20 | 0–3 | . | 0–3 | 0–3 | 3–0 | 0–3 | . | . | | 2–1 | 0–3 | 3–0 | 1–2 | 1–2 | MIZZ | E7 | 3–7 | 2–5 |
| MISS | 6–24 | 0–3 | 1–2 | 0–3 | 0–3 | 2–1 | . | 0–3 | 1–2 | 1–2 | | . | . | 1–2 | 0–3 | MISS | W7 | 1–9 | 0–5 |
| SCAR | 16–13 | . | 1–2 | 1–2 | 3–0 | 3–0 | 0–3 | 1–1 | 2–1 | 3–0 | . | | 1–2 | . | 1–2 | SCAR | E3 | 4–5 | 3–1 |
| TENN | 16–14 | . | 0–3 | . | 1–2 | 1–2 | 2–1 | 1–2 | 3–0 | 0–3 | . | 2–1 | | 3–0 | 3–0 | TENN | E4 | 5–5 | 3–2 |
| TAMU | 14–16 | 1–2 | 0–3 | 2–1 | 2–1 | . | 2–1 | 1–2 | 2–1 | 2–1 | 2–1 | . | 0–3 | | . | TAMU | W5 | 6–4 | 0–2 |
| VAN | 19–11 | 1–2 | 2–1 | . | 0–3 | 3–0 | 3–0 | . | 3–0 | 2–1 | 3–0 | 2–1 | 0–3 | . | | VAN | E2 | 7–3 | 4–2 |
| Team | W–L | ALA | ARK | AUB | FLA | UGA | KEN | LSU | MSU | MIZZ | MISS | SCAR | TENN | TAMU | VAN | Team | Div | SR | SW |

Updated for entire regular season. Tiebrkrs: FLA>ARK VAN common. KEN&TENN>ALA LSU common. TENN>KEN hd–hd.

== Rankings ==
Ranking movements Legend: ██ Increase in ranking ██ Decrease in ranking RV = Received votes
| | Week | | | | | | | | | | | | | | | | | | |
| Poll | Pre | 1 | 2 | 3 | 4 | 5 | 6 | 7 | 8 | 9 | 10 | 11 | 12 | 13 | 14 | 15 | 16 | 17 | Final |
|---|---|---|---|---|---|---|---|---|---|---|---|---|---|---|---|---|---|---|---|
| Coaches' | | * | | | | 20 | RV | | | | | | | | | | | | |
| Baseball America | | | | | | 18 | 25 | | | | | | | | | | | | |
| Collegiate Baseball^ | | | | | | 15 | | | | | | | | | | | | | |
| NCBWA† | | RV | RV | RV | RV | 21 | 29 | | | | | | | | | | | | |
| D1Baseball | | | | | | 22 | | | | | | | | | | | | | |

^ Collegiate Baseball ranked 40 teams in their preseason poll, but only ranked 30 teams weekly during the season.
† NCBWA ranks 30 teams in their preseason poll, but only ranks 25 teams weekly during the season.
* A new poll was not released for this week, so for comparison purposes, the previous week's ranking is inserted in this week's slot.
