= 2023 Tennessee Volunteers baseball team =

College Baseball Season

2023 Tennessee Volunteers baseball

NCAA Clemson Regional champions Hattiesburg Super Regional champions

College World Series, 1–2
- Conference: Southeastern Conference
- Eastern Division

Ranking
- Coaches: No. 21
- Record: 44–22 (16–14 SEC)
- Head coach: Tony Vitello (6th season)
- Assistant coaches: Frank Anderson; Josh Elander
- Home stadium: Lindsey Nelson Stadium

Uniform
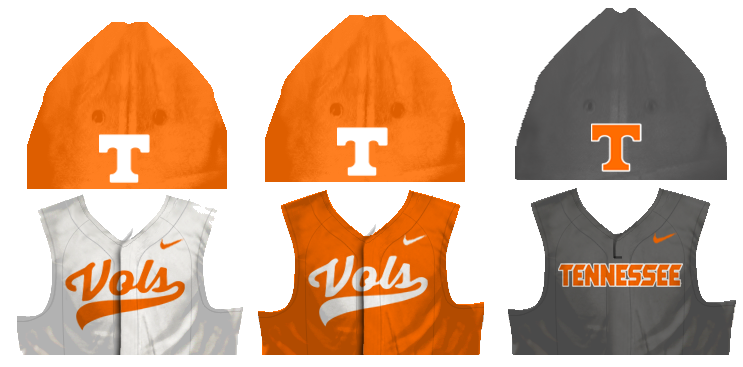

2023 Southeastern Conference baseball standings
	Conf.						Overall
Team	W		L		T	PCT	W		L		T	PCT
Eastern
No. 2 Florida ^{x}‍†‍‍^{y}	20	–	10	–	0	.667	54	–	17	–	0	.761
No. 19 Vanderbilt ‍‍‡‍^{y}	19	–	11	–	0	.633	42	–	20	–	0	.677
No. 13 South Carolina ‍‍‍^{y}	16	–	13	–	0	.552	42	–	21	–	0	.667
No. 7 Tennessee ‍‍‍^{y}	16	–	14	–	0	.533	44	–	22	–	0	.667
No. 17 Kentucky ‍‍‍^{y}	16	–	14	–	0	.533	40	–	21	–	0	.656
Georgia ‍‍‍	11	–	19	–	0	.367	29	–	27	–	0	.518
Missouri ‍‍‍	10	–	20	–	0	.333	30	–	24	–	0	.556
Western
No. 16 Arkansas ^{x}‍†‍‍^{y}	20	–	10	–	0	.667	43	–	18	–	0	.705
No. 1 LSU ‍‍‍^{y}	19	–	10	–	0	.655	54	–	17	–	0	.761
Auburn ‍‍‍^{y}	17	–	13	–	0	.567	34	–	23	–	1	.595
No. 10 Alabama ‍‍‍^{y}	16	–	14	–	0	.533	43	–	21	–	0	.672
Texas A&M ‍‍‍^{y}	14	–	16	–	0	.467	38	–	27	–	0	.585
Mississippi State ‍‍‍	9	–	21	–	0	.300	27	–	26	–	0	.509
Ole Miss ‍‍‍	6	–	24	–	0	.200	25	–	29	–	0	.463
x – Division champion † – Conference champion ‡ – Tournament champion y – Invited to the NCAA tournament As of June 26, 2023; Rankings from D1Baseball

The 2023 Tennessee Volunteers baseball team represented the University of Tennessee in the 2023 NCAA Division I baseball season. The Volunteers played their home games at Lindsey Nelson Stadium.

== Previous season ==
The Volunteers finished 57–9, 25–5 in the SEC to finish in first place in the East division and overall in the regular season. The Volunteers also won the 2022 Southeastern Conference baseball tournament. The overall number one seed in the 2022 NCAA Division I baseball tournament, they hosted the 2022 Knoxville Regional and finished 3–0. The Vols then hosted Notre Dame in the Knoxville Super Regional, losing 1–2 in the three-game series.

== Preseason ==
=== Preseason SEC awards and honors ===
Infielder Cam Redding was named to the SEC Preseason team.

Preseason All-SEC First Team
Player	No.	Position	Class
Chase Dollander	11	SP	Senior
Chase Burns	23	SP	Junior

Preseason All-SEC Second Team
Player	No.	Position	Class
Maui Ahuna	2	SS	Junior
Camden Sewell	16	RP	Graduate

=== Coaches poll ===
The SEC baseball coaches' poll was released on February 9, 2023. Tennessee was picked to finish first the SEC East.

SEC East Coaches' Poll
Predicted finish	Team	Points
1	Tennessee	90 (12)
2	Florida	79 (2)
3	Vanderbilt	64
4	South Carolina	51
5	Georgia	48
6	Kentucky	34
7	Missouri	19

== Personnel ==
=== Starters ===
Lineup
Pos.	No.	Player.	Year
C	14	Charlie Taylor	RS Sophomore
1B	25	Blake Burke	Sophomore
2B	1	Christian Moore	Sophomore
3B	44	Zane Denton	Senior
SS	2	Maui Ahuna	Junior
LF	17	Jared Dickey	RS Sophomore
CF	9	Hunter Ensley	RS Sophomore
RF	8	Christian Scott	Senior
DH	10	Griffin Merritt	Graduate

Weekend pitching rotation
Day	No.	Player.	Year
Friday	29	Andrew Lindsey	Junior
Saturday	11	Chase Dollander	Junior
Sunday	23	Drew Beam	Sophomore

=== Roster ===
2023 Tennessee Volunteers baseball team
Players
Coaches

#	Pos.	Name	B/T	Height	Weight	Year	Home town
1	INF	Christian Moore	R/R	6 ft 1 in (1.85 m)	210 lb (95 kg)	So	Brooklyn, NY
2	INF	Maui Ahuna	L/R	6 ft 1 in (1.85 m)	175 lb (79 kg)	Jr	Hilo, HI
4	INF	Jake Kendro	R/R	6 ft 1 in (1.85 m)	187 lb (85 kg)	Fr	North Huntingdon, PA
5	INF	Austen Jaslove	R/R	6 ft 2 in (1.88 m)	180 lb (82 kg)	RS So	Knoxville, TN
6	OF	Kyle Booker	L/R	5 ft 11 in (1.8 m)	177 lb (80 kg)	Jr	Southaven, MS
7		Logan Chambers	L/R	5 ft 10 in (1.78 m)	182 lb (83 kg)	Jr	Bryant, AR
8	OF	Christian Scott	L/L	5 ft 10 in (1.78 m)	175 lb (79 kg)	Sr	Clarksville, TN
9	OF	Hunter Ensley	R/R	6 ft 1 in (1.85 m)	200 lb (91 kg)	RS So	Huntingdon, TN
10	OF	Griffin Merritt	R/R	6 ft 2 in (1.88 m)	223 lb (101 kg)	Gr	Cincinnati, OH
11	RHP	Chase Dollander	R/R	6 ft 2 in (1.88 m)	200 lb (91 kg)	Jr	Evans, GA
13	OF	Reese Chapman	L/R	6 ft 1 in (1.85 m)	195 lb (88 kg)	Fr	Parker, CO
14	C	Charlie Taylor	R/R	5 ft 11 in (1.8 m)	190 lb (86 kg)	RS So	Dunwoody, GA
15	LHP	Shawn Scott	L/L	6 ft 0 in (1.83 m)	180 lb (82 kg)	RS So	Clarksville, TN
16	RHP	Camden Sewell	L/R	6 ft 4 in (1.93 m)	175 lb (79 kg)	Gr	Cleveland, TN
17	OF	Jared Dickey	L/R	6 ft 2 in (1.88 m)	204 lb (93 kg)	RS So	Mount Juliet, TN
18	C	Ryan Miller	L/R	6 ft 3 in (1.91 m)	203 lb (92 kg)	RS So	Dublin, OH
19	RHP	Seth Halvorsen	R/R	6 ft 2 in (1.88 m)	225 lb (102 kg)	RS Jr	Plymouth, MN
20	RHP	Bryce Jenkins	R/R	5 ft 11 in (1.8 m)	175 lb (79 kg)	Jr	Knoxville, TN
21	OF	Kavares Tears	L/L	6 ft 0 in (1.83 m)	205 lb (93 kg)	RS Fr	Lewisburg, TN
23	RHP	Chase Burns	R/R	6 ft 4 in (1.93 m)	195 lb (88 kg)	So	Gallatin, TN
25	INF	Blake Burke	L/L	6 ft 3 in (1.91 m)	140 lb (64 kg)	So	Brentwood, CA
26	LHP	Wyatt Evans	L/L	6 ft 6 in (1.98 m)	245 lb (111 kg)	So	Greenville, SC
27	LHP	Jacob Bimbi	L/L	6 ft 0 in (1.83 m)	182 lb (83 kg)	Jr	Crystal Lake, IL
28	RHP	Aaron Combs	R/R	6 ft 3 in (1.91 m)	190 lb (86 kg)	RS So	Sarasota, FL
29	RHP	Andrew Lindsey	R/R	6 ft 3 in (1.91 m)	216 lb (98 kg)	Jr	New Johnsonville, TN
30	C	Cal Stark	R/R	6 ft 1 in (1.85 m)	204 lb (93 kg)	Jr	Knoxville, TN
31	RHP	Austin Hunley	R/R	6 ft 3 in (1.91 m)	190 lb (86 kg)	Fr	Mount Juliet, TN
32	RHP	Drew Beam	R/R	6 ft 4 in (1.93 m)	208 lb (94 kg)	So	Murfreesboro, TN
33	RHP	AJ Russell	R/R	6 ft 6 in (1.98 m)	195 lb (88 kg)	Fr	Franklin, TN
34	RHP	Hollis Fanning	R/R	6 ft 8 in (2.03 m)	230 lb (104 kg)	Jr	Tullahoma, TN
35	LHP	Kirby Connell	S/L	5 ft 11 in (1.8 m)	210 lb (95 kg)	Sr	Johnson City, TN
36	LHP	Andrew Behnke	L/L	5 ft 10 in (1.78 m)	183 lb (83 kg)	Fr	Nashville, TN
38	OF	Colby Backus	R/R	6 ft 4 in (1.93 m)	223 lb (101 kg)	RS So	Johnson City, TN
40	RHP	Zach Joyce	R/R	6 ft 4 in (1.93 m)	225 lb (102 kg)	Jr	Knoxville, TN
41	RHP	Turner Swistak	R/R	6 ft 3 in (1.91 m)	216 lb (98 kg)	Jr	Hattiesburg, MS
42	LHP	Jake Fitzgibbons	L/L	5 ft 11 in (1.8 m)	175 lb (79 kg)	RS So	Mount Juliet, TN
43	RHP	JJ Garcia	R/R	6 ft 6 in (1.98 m)	190 lb (86 kg)	Fr	Statesville, NC
44	INF	Zane Denton	S/R	6 ft 1 in (1.85 m)	200 lb (91 kg)	Sr	Brentwood, TN
45	RHP	Hunter Sloop	R/R	6 ft 7 in (2.01 m)	223 lb (101 kg)	Fr	Concord, NC
46	OF	Dylan Dreiling	L/L	5 ft 11 in (1.8 m)	197 lb (89 kg)	Fr	Hays, KS
48	LHP	Zander Sechrist	R/L	6 ft 2 in (1.88 m)	192 lb (87 kg)	Jr	Buford, GA

Head coach

Tony Vitello

Assistant coach(es)

Frank Anderson
Josh Elander
Richard Jackson

Legend

- (C) Team captain
- (S) Suspended
- (I) Ineligible
- Injured
- Current redshirt

Roster
Last update: March 28, 2023

=== Coaching staff ===
2023 Tennessee Volunteers coaching staff
Name	Position	Seasons at Tennessee
Tony Vitello	Head coach	6
Frank Anderson	Assistant Coach/Pitching	6
Josh Elander	Assistant Coach/Recruiting Coordinator	6
Richard Jackson	Volunteer Assistant Coach	4
Luke Bonfield	Director of Player Development	4
Ricky Martinez	Student Assistant Coach	2
Quentin Eberhardt	Director of Baseball Sports Performance	6

== Offseason ==
=== Signing Day Recruits ===
The following players signed National Letter of Intents to play for Tennessee in 2023.

Player	Hometown	High School
Pitchers
Austin Hunley	Mount Juliet, Tennessee	Mount Juliet
AJ Russell	Franklin, Tennessee	Franklin (TN)
Andrew Behnke	Nashville, Tennessee	Donelson Christian
JJ Garcia	Statesville, North Carolina	Combine
Hunter Sloop	Concord, North Carolina	P27 Academy
Hitters
Jake Kendro	North Huntingdon, Pennsylvania	Norwin
Reese Chapman	Parker, Colorado	Grandview (CO)
Dylan Dreiling	Hays, Kansas	Hays

=== 2022 MLB draft ===
Round	Pick	Player	Position	MLB Team
#1	#28	Drew Gilbert	OF	Houston Astros
#2	#38	Jordan Beck	RF	Colorado Rockies
#2	#52	Blade Tidwell	RHP	New York Mets
#3	#84	Trey Lipscomb	3B	Washington Nationals
#3	#89	Ben Joyce	RHP	Los Angeles Angels
#6	#168	Will Mabrey	LHP	Arizona Diamondbacks
#6	#174	Jorel Ortega	SS	Minnesota Twins
#7	#207	Seth Stephenson	LF	Detroit Tigers
#7	#221	Mark McLaughlin	RHP	Chicago White Sox
#14	#411	Cortland Lawson	SS	Washington Nationals

== Schedule and results ==
2023 Tennessee Volunteers baseball game log (44–22)
Regular season (38–18)

February (7–2)
Date	Opponent	Rank	Site/stadium	Score	Win	Loss	Save	TV	Attendance	Overall record	SEC record
MLB Desert Invitational
February 17	vs. No. 25 Arizona*	No. 2	Salt River Fields at Talking Stick; Scottsdale, AZ	**L** 1–3	Burke (1–0)	**Dollander** (0–1)	Ebbing (1)	MLBN	6,389	0–1	—
February 18	at Grand Canyon*	No. 2	Brazell Field; Phoenix, AZ	**L** 3–4	Avitia (1–0)	**Lindsey** (0–1)	None	MLBN	4,447	0–2	—
February 19	vs. UC San Diego*	No. 2	Sloan Park; Mesa, AZ	**W** 7–0	**Beam** (1–0)	Chriss (0–1)	None	MLBN	2,182	1–2	—
February 21	Alabama A&M*	No. 3	Lindsey Nelson Stadium; Knoxville, TN	**W** 10–0^{8}	**Fitzgibbons** (1–0)	Sorrell (0–1)	None	SECN+	4,550	2–2	—
February 22	Alabama A&M*	No. 3	Lindsey Nelson Stadium	**W** 23–1^{7}	**Combs** (1–0)	Mateo (0–1)	None	SECN+	4,382	3–2	—
February 24	Dayton*	No. 3	Lindsey Nelson Stadium	**W** 12–2	**Dollander** (1–1)	Steinhauer (0–2)	None	SECN+	4,264	4–2	—
February 25	Dayton*	No. 3	Lindsey Nelson Stadium	**W** 4–1	**Burns** (1–0)	Manfredi (0–1)	**Halvorsen** (1)	SECN+	4,024	5–2	—
February 26	Dayton*	No. 3	Lindsey Nelson Stadium	**W** 6–0	**Burns** (2–0)	Espelin (0–1)	None	SECN+	4,305	6–2	—
February 28	Charleston Southern*	No. 3	Lindsey Nelson Stadium	**W** 6–1	**Halvorsen** (1–0)	Massey (0–1)	None	SECN+	4,088	7–2	—

March (13–6)
Date	Opponent	Rank	Site/stadium	Score	Win	Loss	Save	TV	Attendance	Overall record	SEC record
March 1	Charleston Southern*	No. 3	Lindsey Nelson Stadium	**W** 8–2	**Fitzgibbons** (2–0)	Olsen (0–1)	None	SECN+	4,115	8–2	—
March 3	Gonzaga*	No. 3	Lindsey Nelson Stadium	**W** 8–2	**Dollander** (2–1)	Wild (0–2)	None	SECN+	4,335	9–2	—
March 4	Gonzaga*	No. 3	Lindsey Nelson Stadium	**W** 7–2	**Connell** (1–0)	Graham (0–1)	None	SECN+	5,037	10–2	—
March 5	Gonzaga*	No. 3	Lindsey Nelson Stadium	**W** 19–7	**Jenkins** (1–0)	Deschryver (0–2)	None	SECN+	4,558	11–2	—
March 7	Boston College*	No. 3	Lindsey Nelson Stadium	**L** 6–7	Nunan (1–0)	**Halvorsen** (1–1)	None	SECN+	4,749	11–3	—
March 10	Morehead State*	No. 3	Lindsey Nelson Stadium	**W** 23–4	**Dollander** (3–1)	Helton (2–2)	None	SECN+	4,171	12–3	—
March 11	Morehead State*	No. 3	Lindsey Nelson Stadium	**W** 6–0	**Burns** (2–0)	Heron (2–1)	None	SECN+	4,205	13–3	—
March 12	Morehead State*	No. 3	Lindsey Nelson Stadium	**W** 6–3	**Beam** (3–0)	Bakke (1–1)	**Halvorsen** (2)	SECN+	4,162	14–3	—
March 14	Lipscomb*	No. 3	Lindsey Nelson Stadium	**W** 10–0	**Combs** (2–0)	Giles (0–2)	None	SECN+	4,174	15–2	—
March 17	at No. 22 Missouri	No. 3	Taylor Stadium; Columbia, MO	**L** 1–9	Murphy (3–1)	**Dollander** (3–2)	Maltrud (1)	SECN+	1,761	15–4	0–1
March 18	at No. 22 Missouri	No. 3	Taylor Stadium	**L** 4–7	Franklin (4–0)	**Burns** (2–1)	None	SECN+	2,764	15–5	0–2
March 19	at No. 22 Missouri	No. 3	Taylor Stadium	**L** 1–7	Troesser (2–1)	**Beam** (3–1)	None	SECN+	2,764	15–6	0–3
March 21	Western Carolina*	No. 12	Lindsey Nelson Stadium	**W** 7–0	**Combs** (3–0)	Visconti (2–2)	None	SECN+	4,312	16–6	—
March 24	No. 21 Texas A&M	No. 12	Lindsey Nelson Stadium	**W** 10–4	**Dollander** (4–2)	Dettmer (1–3)	None	SECN+	4,700	17–6	1–3
March 25	No. 21 Texas A&M	No. 12	Lindsey Nelson Stadium	**W** 8–7	**Sewell** (1–0)	Johnston (2–1)	None	ESPNU	4,472	18–6	2–3
March 26	No. 21 Texas A&M	No. 12	Lindsey Nelson Stadium	**W** 9–6	**Halvorsen (2–1)**	Lamkin (1–2)	None	SECN	4,521	19–6	3–3
March 28	UNC Asheville*	No. 10	Lindsey Nelson Stadium	**W** 5–0	**Bimbi** (1–0)	Sabo (2–1)	None	SECN+	4,228	20–6	—
March 30	at No. 1 LSU	No. 10	Alex Box Stadium; Baton Rouge, LA	**L** 2–5	Edwards (4–0)	**Halvorsen** (2–2)	None	ESPNU	13,608	20–7	3–4
March 31	at No. 1 LSU	No. 10	Alex Box Stadium	**L** 4–6	Floyd (5–0)	**Burns** (2–2)	Herring (1)	SECN	12,551	20–8	3–5

April (10–6)
Date	Opponent	Rank	Site/stadium	Score	Win	Loss	Save	TV	Attendance	Overall record	SEC record
April 1	at No. 1 LSU	No. 10	Alex Box Stadium	**W** 14–7	**Sewell** (2–0)	Hurd (2–1)	None	SECN+	11,805	21–8	4–5
April 6	No. 3 Florida	No. 11	Lindsey Nelson Stadium	**L** 1–6	Sproat (5–1)	**Dollander** (4–3)	None	ESPNU	4,727	21–9	4–6
April 7	No. 3 Florida	No. 11	Lindsey Nelson Stadium	**L** 3–9	Waldrep (6–1)	**Burns (2–3)**	None	SECN	4,202	21–10	4–7
April 8	No. 3 Florida	No. 11	Lindsey Nelson Stadium	**W** 14–2^{8}	**Beam** (4–1)	Caglianone (3–1)	None	ESPN2	4,020	22–10	5–7
April 11	Eastern Kentucky*	No. 16	Lindsey Nelson Stadium	**W** 14–2^{7}	**Russell** (1–0)	Yates (0–1)	None	SECN+	4,293	23–10	—
April 14	at No. 5 Arkansas	No. 16	Baum-Walker Stadium; Fayetteville, AR	**L** 2–5	Hollan (6–1)	**Lindsey** (0–2)	Smith (2)	SECN	11,043	23–11	5–8
April 15	at No. 5 Arkansas	No. 16	Baum-Walker Stadium	**L** 3–6	McEntire (5–1)	**Dollander** (4–4)	Wood (3)	SECN+	11,076	23–12	5–9
April 16	at No. 5 Arkansas	No. 16	Baum-Walker Stadium	**L** 2–7	Carter (6–0)	**Beam** (4–2)	None	SECN+	10,625	23–13	5–10
April 18	Tennessee Tech*		Lindsey Nelson Stadium	**L** 5–12	Smith (1–1)	**Sechrist** (0–1)	None	SECN+	4,190	23–14	—
April 21	No. 4 Vanderbilt		Lindsey Nelson Stadium	**W** 4–3^{12}	**Burns** (3–3)	Maldonado (1–1)	None	SECN+	4,607	24–14	6–10
April 22	No. 4 Vanderbilt		Lindsey Nelson Stadium	**W** 17–1^{7}	**Dollander** (5–4)	Cunningham (1–2)	None	ESPN2	4,617	25–14	7–10
April 23	No. 4 Vanderbilt		Lindsey Nelson Stadium	**W** 10–5	**Beam** (5–2)	Futrell (6–2)	None	ESPN2	4,518	26–14	8–10
April 25	Bellarmine*	No. 24	Lindsey Nelson Stadium	**W** 19–1	**Bimbi** (2–0)	Craven (1–3)	None	SECN+	3,991	27–14	—
April 27	Mississippi State	No. 24	Lindsey Nelson Stadium	**W** 8–7	**Burns** (4–3)	Hunt (1–2)	None	SECN	4,011	28–14	9–10
April 28	Mississippi State	No. 24	Lindsey Nelson Stadium	**W** 12–8	**Sewell** (3–0)	Tapper (2–1)	None	SECN+	4,471	29–14	10–10
April 29	Mississippi State	No. 24	Lindsey Nelson Stadium	**W** 13–2^{7}	**Beam** (6–2)	Cijntje (3–3)	None	ESPNU	4,790	30–14	11–10

May (8–4)
Date	Opponent	Rank	Site/stadium	Score	Win	Loss	Save	TV	Attendance	Overall record	SEC record
May 2	Wofford*	No. 18	Lindsey Nelson Stadium	**W** 13–3^{7}	**Russell** (2–0)	Cowan (3–3)	None	SECN+	4,442	31–14	—
May 5	at Georgia	No. 18	Foley Field; Athens, GA	**W** 12–3	**Sewell** (4–0)	Smith (2–2)	None	SECN+	3,465	32–14	12–10
May 6	at Georgia	No. 18	Foley Field	**L** 1–3	Evans (2–0)	**Dollander** (5–5)	Finley (4)	SECN+	3,852	32–15	12–11
May 7	at Georgia	No. 18	Foley Field	**L** 4–9	Greenler (2–1)	**Beam** (6–3)	None	SECN+	3,506	32–16	12–12
May 9	Austin Peay*	No. 23	Lindsey Nelson Stadium	**W** 9–4	**Combs** (4–0)	Magrans (3–2)	None	SECN+	4,364	33–16	—
May 12	No. 17 Kentucky	No. 23	Lindsey Nelson Stadium	**W** 10–6	**Lindsey** (1–2)	Smith (4–2)	None	SECN+	4,502	34–16	13–12
May 13	No. 17 Kentucky	No. 23	Lindsey Nelson Stadium	**W** 10–7	**Dollander** (6–5)	Bosma (4–4)	**Burns** (1)	SECN	4,457	35–16	14–12
May 14	No. 17 Kentucky	No. 23	Lindsey Nelson Stadium	**L** 0–10	Williams (4–1)	**Beam** (6–4)	None	SECN+	4,478	35–17	14–13
May 16	Belmont*	No. 18	Lindsey Nelson Stadium	**W** 9–5^{8}	**Joyce** (1–0)	Times (0–1)	None	SECN+	4,191	36–17	—
May 19	at No. 13 South Carolina	No. 18	Founders Park; Columbia, SC	**W** 5–0	**Lindsey** (2–2)	Jones (4–4)	None	SECN+	7,815	37–17	15–13
May 20	at No. 13 South Carolina	No. 18	Founders Park	**L** 1–6^{7}	Mahoney (6–2)	**Dollander** (6–6)	None	SECN+	8,242	37–18	15–14
May 20	at No. 13 South Carolina	No. 18	Founders Park	**W** 12–1^{7}	**Beam** (7–4)	Becker (4–3)	None	SECN+	6,784	38–18	16–14

Postseason (6–4)

SEC Tournament (0–1)
Date	Opponent	Rank	Site/stadium	Score	Win	Loss	Save	TV	Attendance	Overall record	Tournament record
May 23	vs. Texas A&M (10)	No. 13 (7)	Hoover Metropolitan Stadium; Hoover, AL	**L** 0–3	Wansing (3–3)	**Halvorsen** (2–3)	Aschenbeck (3)	SECN	5,510	38–19	0—1

Clemson Regional (3–0)
Date	Opponent	Rank	Site/stadium	Score	Win	Loss	Save	TV	Attendance	Overall record	NCAA record
June 2	vs. Charlotte (3)	No. 21 (2)	Doug Kingsmore Stadium; Clemson, SC	**W** 8–1	**Lindsey** (3–2)	Kramer (6–5)	None	ESPN+	4,767	39–19	1—0
June 3	vs. No. 3 Clemson (1)	No. 21 (2)	Doug Kingsmore Stadium	**W** 6–5^{14}	**Halvorsen** (6–5)	Tallent (1–1)	None	ESPN+	6,275	40–19	2—0
June 4	vs. Charlotte (3)	No. 21 (2)	Doug Kingsmore Stadium	**W** 9–2	**Beam** (8–4)	Spolyar (2–3)	None	ESPN+	5,106	41–19	3—0

Hattiesburg Super Regional (2–1)
Date	Opponent	Rank	Site/stadium	Score	Win	Loss	Save	TV	Attendance	Overall record	NCAA record
June 11	at No. 13 Southern Miss	No. 21	Pete Taylor Park; Hattiesburg, MS	**L** 3–5	Storm (7–2)	**Lindsey** (3–3)	None	ESPN+	5,820	41–20	0—1
June 11	at No. 13 Southern Miss	No. 21	Pete Taylor Park	**W** 8–4	**Dollander** (7–6)	Hall (12–4)	None	ESPN+	5,822	42–20	1—1
June 12	at No. 13 Southern Miss	No. 21	Pete Taylor Park	**W** 5–0	**Beam** (9–4)	Mazza (5–2)	**Burns** (2)	ESPN+	5,809	43–20	2—1

College World Series (1–2)
Date	Opponent	Rank	Site/stadium	Score	Win	Loss	Save	TV	Attendance	Overall record	NCAA record
June 17	vs. No. 7 LSU (5)	No. 21	Charles Schwab Field; Omaha, NE	**L** 3–6	Skenes (13–2)	**Lindsey** (3–4)	None	ESPN	25,010	43–21	0—1
June 19	vs. No. 6 Stanford (8)	No. 21	Charles Schwab Field	**W** 6–4	**Burns** (5–3)	Scott (5–5)	None	ESPN	23,886	44–21	1—1
June 20	vs. No. 7 LSU (5)	No. 21	Charles Schwab Field	**L** 0–5	Ackenhausen (3–0)	**Beam** (9–5)	None	ESPN	24,874	44–22	1—2

*Denotes non–conference game • Schedule source • Rankings based on the teams' current ranking in the D1Baseball poll
**W** Tennessee win • **L** Tennessee loss • Postponement or cancellation • **Bold** denotes Tennessee player

== Statistics ==
=== Record vs. conference opponents ===
Last two do not qualify for conf. tourn. Blank are not scheduled. Blue are home games, otherwise away.

2023 SEC baseball records Source: 2023 SEC baseball game results, 2023 SEC baseball schedule
Team	W–L	ALA	ARK	AUB	FLA	UGA	KEN	LSU	MSU	MIZZ	MISS	SCAR	TENN	TAMU	VAN	Team	Div	SR	SW
ALA	16–14		1–2	2–1	1–2	.	1–2	0–3	1–2	3–0	3–0	.	.	2–1	2–1	ALA	W4	5–5	2–1
ARK	20–10	2–1		3–0	.	0–3	.	1–2	3–0	.	2–1	2–1	3–0	3–0	1–2	ARK	W1	7–3	4–1
AUB	17–13	1–2	0–3		1–2	2–1	.	2–1	2–1	3–0	3–0	2–1	.	1–2	.	AUB	W3	6–4	2–1
FLA	20–10	2–1	.	2–1		2–1	2–1	.	.	3–0	3–0	0–3	2–1	1–2	3–0	FLA	E1	8–2	3–1
UGA	11–19	.	3–0	1–2	1–2		2–1	1–2	.	0–3	1–2	0–3	2–1	.	0–3	UGA	E6	3–7	1–3
KEN	16–14	2–1	.	.	1–2	1–2		1–2	3–0	3–0	.	3–0	1–2	1–2	0–3	KEN	E5	4–6	3–1
LSU	19–10	3–0	2–1	1–2	.	2–1	2–1		1–2	.	3–0	1–1	2–1	2–1	.	LSU	W2	7–2	2–0
MSU	9–21	2–1	0–3	1–2	.	.	0–3	2–1		.	2–1	1–2	0–3	1–2	0–3	MSU	W6	3–7	0–4
MIZZ	10–20	0–3	.	0–3	0–3	3–0	0–3	.	.		2–1	0–3	3–0	1–2	1–2	MIZZ	E7	3–7	2–5
MISS	6–24	0–3	1–2	0–3	0–3	2–1	.	0–3	1–2	1–2		.	.	1–2	0–3	MISS	W7	1–9	0–5
SCAR	16–13	.	1–2	1–2	3–0	3–0	0–3	1–1	2–1	3–0	.		1–2	.	1–2	SCAR	E3	4–5	3–1
TENN	16–14	.	0–3	.	1–2	1–2	2–1	1–2	3–0	0–3	.	2–1		3–0	3–0	TENN	E4	5–5	3–2
TAMU	14–16	1–2	0–3	2–1	2–1	.	2–1	1–2	2–1	2–1	2–1	.	0–3		.	TAMU	W5	6–4	0–2
VAN	19–11	1–2	2–1	.	0–3	3–0	3–0	.	3–0	2–1	3–0	2–1	0–3	.		VAN	E2	7–3	4–2
Team	W–L	ALA	ARK	AUB	FLA	UGA	KEN	LSU	MSU	MIZZ	MISS	SCAR	TENN	TAMU	VAN	Team	Div	SR	SW

Updated for entire regular season. Tiebrkrs: FLA>ARK VAN common. KEN&TENN>ALA LSU common. TENN>KEN hd–hd.

== Rankings ==
Ranking movements Legend: ██ Increase in ranking ██ Decrease in ranking — = Not ranked RV = Received votes
	Week																			
Poll	Pre	1	2	3	4	5	6	7	8	9	10	11	12	13	14	15	16	17	18	Final
Coaches'	2	2*	2	2	2	12	9	8	12	23	16	16	20	19	13	16				
Baseball America	2	6	6	5	4	11	11	12	17	—	—	21	—	19	18	20				
Collegiate Baseball^	5	11	6	3	3	22	16	17	20	RV	26	19	28	29	25	26	8			
NCBWA†	2	11	6	4	4	12	11	11	12	21	18	16	19	19	15	18	6			
D1Baseball	2	3	3	3	2	12	10	11	16	—	24	18	23	18	13	21				

^ Collegiate Baseball ranked 40 teams in their preseason poll, but only ranked 30 teams weekly during the season.
† NCBWA ranks 30 teams in their preseason poll, but only ranks 25 teams weekly during the season.
* A new poll was not released for this week, so for comparison purposes, the previous week's ranking is inserted in this week's slot.
