= Florida–Miami baseball rivalry =

American college baseball rivalry

Florida – Miami baseball rivalry
- Florida Gators Miami Hurricanes
- First meeting: April 9, 1940; Florida 18, Miami 13
- Latest meeting: May 30, 2026; Florida 22, Miami 10

Statistics
- Total meetings: 276
- All-time series: Florida leads, 139–136–1 (.504)
- Largest victory: Florida, 19–5 (February 14, 1998)
- Longest win streak: Florida, 11 (March 7, 2010–March 4, 2012)
- Current win streak: Florida, 3 (2026–present)

Location of the University of Florida (1) and University of Miami (2)

The Florida–Miami baseball rivalry is an American college baseball rivalry between the University of Florida Gators and University of Miami Hurricanes.

The Florida and Miami baseball series began in 1940, and the game has usually been played at least two times during each regular season since 1960. Since the 2004 season, the two teams have played a weekend series in the early portion of the non-conference schedule, alternating each season between Coral Gables and Gainesville. The two programs have faced off in fourteen editions of the NCAA Division I baseball tournament, meeting in the College World Series in 2015.

The two programs' relevance on the national scale combined with the geographical proximity has forged a fierce rivalry among both fanbases, with both squads considering the series to be among the most important on their schedule during the season, and has consistently attracted near-capacity crowds at each respective home stadium.

The second game of the 2025 regular season series between the two teams in Gainesville saw a record crowd of 9,303 fans in attendance. This marked the largest ever attendance for any on-campus college baseball game in the state of Florida. The same series also set the record for the largest combined attendance over an on-campus three-game series, with 23,737 total fans attending the three-game set at Condron Family Ballpark.

== Game results ==
| Florida victories | Miami victories | Tie games |

| No. | Date | Location | Winning team | | Losing team | |
|---|---|---|---|---|---|---|
| 1 | April 9, 1940 | Coral Gables | Florida | 18 | Miami | 13 |
| 2 | April 4, 1947 | Coral Gables | Miami | 9 | Florida | 5 |
| 3 | April 5, 1947 | Coral Gables | Miami | 1 | Florida | 0 |
| 4 | May 7, 1948 | Gainesville | Florida | 16 | Miami | 7 |
| 5 | May 8, 1948 | Gainesville | Florida | 8 | Miami | 7 |
| 6 | April 8, 1949 | Coral Gables | Florida | 17 | Miami | 4 |
| 7 | April 9, 1949 | Coral Gables | Miami | 9 | Florida | 8 |
| 8 | May 13, 1949 | Gainesville | Florida | 9 | Miami | 5 |
| 9 | May 14, 1949 | Gainesville | Miami | 7 | Florida | 4 |
| 10 | April 7, 1950 | Coral Gables | Florida | 3 | Miami | 2^{13} |
| 11 | April 8, 1950 | Coral Gables | Miami | 5 | Florida | 3 |
| 12 | May 1, 1950 | Gainesville | Florida | 6 | Miami | 4 |
| 13 | May 2, 1950 | Gainesville | Miami | 12 | Florida | 9 |
| 14 | April 30, 1951 | Gainesville | Miami | 4 | Florida | 3^{10} |
| 15 | May 1, 1951 | Gainesville | Florida | 17 | Miami | 9 |
| 16 | April 11, 1952 | Coral Gables | Florida | 4 | Miami | 1 |
| 17 | April 12, 1952 | Coral Gables | Florida | 8 | Miami | 5 |
| 18 | May 5, 1952 | Gainesville | Florida | 10 | Miami | 3 |
| 19 | May 6, 1952 | Gainesville | Tie | 13 | Tie | 13 |
| 20 | March 12, 1954 | Coral Gables | Florida | 9 | Miami | 7 |
| 21 | March 13, 1954 | Coral Gables | Florida | 9 | Miami | 8 |
| 22 | March 28, 1955 | Gainesville | Florida | 4 | Miami | 0 |
| 23 | March 29, 1955 | Gainesville | Miami | 4 | Florida | 3 |
| 24 | April 2, 1956 | Coral Gables | Florida | 6 | Miami | 3 |
| 25 | April 3, 1956 | Coral Gables | Florida | 4 | Miami | 0 |
| 26 | March 16, 1957 | Gainesville | Florida | 9 | Miami | 5 |
| 27 | March 16, 1957 | Gainesville | Florida | 10 | Miami | 1 |
| 28 | March 28, 1958 | Coral Gables | Miami | 3 | Florida | 1 |
| 29 | March 29, 1958 | Coral Gables | Miami | 9 | Florida | 8^{11} |
| 30 | April 1, 1960 | Coral Gables | Florida | 9 | Miami | 3 |
| 31 | April 2, 1960 | Coral Gables | Miami | 3 | Florida | 2 |

| No. | Date | Location | Winning team | | Losing team | |
|---|---|---|---|---|---|---|
| 32 | April 24, 1961 | Gainesville | Florida | 10 | Miami | 4 |
| 33 | April 25, 1961 | Gainesville | Miami | 19 | Florida | 9 |
| 34 | March 9, 1962 | Coral Gables | Miami | 14 | Florida | 10 |
| 35 | March 10, 1962 | Coral Gables | Florida | 12 | Miami | 7 |
| 36 | May 13, 1963 | Gainesville | Miami | 4 | Florida | 0 |
| 37 | May 14, 1963 | Gainesville | Florida | 11 | Miami | 0 |
| 38 | March 13, 1964 | Coral Gables | Miami | 3 | Florida | 1 |
| 39 | March 14, 1964 | Coral Gables | Florida | 13 | Miami | 7 |
| 40 | March 14, 1964 | Coral Gables | Miami | 2 | Florida | 1 |
| 41 | March 26, 1965 | Coral Gables | Florida | 2 | Miami | 0 |
| 42 | April 23, 1965 | Gainesville | Miami | 2 | Florida | 1 |
| 43 | April 24, 1965 | Gainesville | Miami | 3 | Florida | 0 |
| 44 | April 24, 1965 | Gainesville | Florida | 7 | Miami | 3 |
| 45 | March 4, 1966 | Coral Gables | Miami | 10 | Florida | 5 |
| 46 | March 5, 1966 | Coral Gables | Florida | 6 | Miami | 5 |
| 47 | March 5, 1966 | Coral Gables | Florida | 4 | Miami | 3 |
| 48 | April 22, 1966 | Gainesville | Miami | 7 | Florida | 5^{11} |
| 49 | April 23, 1966 | Gainesville | Florida | 3 | Miami | 1 |
| 50 | April 7, 1967 | Gainesville | Florida | 8 | Miami | 1 |
| 51 | April 8, 1967 | Gainesville | Miami | 5 | Florida | 4 |
| 52 | May 12, 1967 | Coral Gables | Miami | 8 | Florida | 1 |
| 53 | May 13, 1967 | Coral Gables | Florida | 11 | Miami | 10 |
| 54 | March 1, 1968 | Coral Gables | Miami | 2 | Florida | 1 |
| 55 | March 2, 1968 | Coral Gables | Miami | 1 | Florida | 0 |
| 56 | April 12, 1968 | Coral Gables | Miami | 5 | Florida | 4 |
| 57 | April 13, 1968 | Coral Gables | Miami | 9 | Florida | 5 |
| 58 | February 28, 1969 | Coral Gables | Miami | 8 | Florida | 7^{12} |
| 59 | March 1, 1969 | Coral Gables | Miami | 9 | Florida | 3 |
| 60 | April 25, 1969 | Gainesville | Miami | 4 | Florida | 3 |
| 61 | April 26, 1969 | Gainesville | Florida | 7 | Miami | 3 |
| 62 | March 6, 1970 | Coral Gables | Miami | 5 | Florida | 4 |

| No. | Date | Location | Winning team | | Losing team | |
|---|---|---|---|---|---|---|
| 63 | March 6, 1970 | Coral Gables | Miami | 5 | Florida | 0 |
| 64 | April 27, 1970 | Gainesville | Florida | 7 | Miami | 6^{13} |
| 65 | April 28, 1970 | Gainesville | Florida | 9 | Miami | 3 |
| 66 | March 5, 1971 | Coral Gables | Miami | 2 | Florida | 0 |
| 67 | March 6, 1971 | Coral Gables | Miami | 7 | Florida | 5 |
| 68 | April 26, 1971 | Gainesville | Miami | 13 | Florida | 5 |
| 69 | April 27, 1971 | Gainesville | Miami | 1 | Florida | 0^{12} |
| 70 | March 3, 1972 | Coral Gables | Miami | 18 | Florida | 6 |
| 71 | March 4, 1972 | Coral Gables | Florida | 6 | Miami | 3 |
| 72 | April 17, 1972 | Coral Gables | Miami | 10 | Florida | 6 |
| 73 | April 18, 1972 | Gainesville | Florida | 8 | Miami | 6 |
| 74 | March 2, 1973 | Coral Gables | Miami | 7 | Florida | 0 |
| 75 | March 3, 1973 | Coral Gables | Miami | 11 | Florida | 1 |
| 76 | April 9, 1973 | Gainesville | Florida | 7 | Miami | 6 |
| 77 | April 10, 1973 | Gainesville | Florida | 5 | Miami | 4 |
| 78 | March 1, 1974 | Coral Gables | Miami | 4 | Florida | 3^{10} |
| 79 | March 2, 1974 | Coral Gables | Florida | 9 | Miami | 6^{12} |
| 80 | April 8, 1974 | Gainesville | Miami | 4 | Florida | 0 |
| 81 | April 9, 1974 | Gainesville | Miami | 6 | Florida | 5 |
| 82 | March 7, 1975 | Gainesville | Florida | 8 | Miami | 2 |
| 83 | March 8, 1975 | Gainesville | Florida | 2 | Miami | 1 |
| 84 | May 3, 1975 | Coral Gables | Miami | 6 | Florida | 1 |
| 85 | May 4, 1975 | Coral Gables | Miami | 6 | Florida | 5 |
| 86 | March 1, 1976 | Gainesville | Florida | 12 | Miami | 2 |
| 87 | March 2, 1976 | Gainesville | Florida | 9 | Miami | 6 |
| 88 | February 25, 1977 | Coral Gables | Florida | 9 | Miami | 6 |
| 89 | February 26, 1977 | Coral Gables | Miami | 5 | Florida | 4 |
| 90 | February 25, 1978 | Gainesville | Florida | 5 | Miami | 4 |
| 91 | February 26, 1978 | Gainesville | Florida | 5 | Miami | 3 |
| 92 | March 3, 1979 | Coral Gables | Miami | 8 | Florida | 2 |
| 93 | March 4, 1979 | Coral Gables | Miami | 5 | Florida | 2 |

| No. | Date | Location | Winning team | | Losing team | |
|---|---|---|---|---|---|---|
| 94 | February 16, 1980 | Gainesville | Miami | 5 | Florida | 0 |
| 95 | February 16, 1980 | Gainesville | Miami | 7 | Florida | 0 |
| 96 | February 20, 1981 | Coral Gables | Miami | 8 | Florida | 5 |
| 97 | February 21, 1981 | Coral Gables | Miami | 2 | Florida | 0 |
| 98 | May 6, 1981 | Gainesville | Florida | 8 | Miami | 7 |
| 99 | May 7, 1981 | Gainesville | Miami | 11 | Florida | 4 |
| 100 | May 24, 1981† | Coral Gables | Miami | 8 | Florida | 6 |
| 101 | February 13, 1982 | Coral Gables | Miami | 7 | Florida | 3 |
| 102 | February 14, 1982 | Coral Gables | Miami | 6 | Florida | 2 |
| 103 | April 18, 1982 | Gainesville | Florida | 6 | Miami | 2 |
| 104 | April 19, 1982 | Gainesville | Miami | 8 | Florida | 7^{11} |
| 105 | February 19, 1983 | Coral Gables | Miami | 5 | Florida | 1 |
| 106 | February 20, 1983 | Coral Gables | Florida | 4 | Miami | 1 |
| 107 | March 8, 1983 | Gainesville | Florida | 5 | Miami | 3 |
| 108 | March 9, 1983 | Gainesville | Miami | 3 | Florida | 2 |
| 109 | February 3, 1984 | Coral Gables | Florida | 9 | Miami | 7 |
| 110 | February 17, 1984 | Coral Gables | Miami | 9 | Florida | 1 |
| 111 | February 18, 1984 | Coral Gables | Florida | 10 | Miami | 3 |
| 112 | March 28, 1984 | Gainesville | Miami | 8 | Florida | 6 |
| 113 | March 28, 1984 | Gainesville | Florida | 7 | Miami | 6^{8} |
| 114 | May 24, 1984† | Tallahassee | Miami | 6 | Florida | 5 |
| 115 | February 15, 1985 | Coral Gables | Miami | 5 | Florida | 2 |
| 116 | February 16, 1985 | Coral Gables | Florida | 4 | Miami | 2 |
| 117 | February 17, 1985 | Coral Gables | Miami | 5 | Florida | 2 |
| 118 | April 19, 1985 | Gainesville | Miami | 11 | Florida | 0 |
| 119 | April 20, 1985 | Gainesville | Miami | 6 | Florida | 4 |
| 120 | May 27, 1985† | Coral Gables | Florida | 8 | Miami | 1 |
| 121 | May 28, 1985† | Coral Gables | Miami | 12 | Florida | 9 |
| 122 | February 14, 1986 | Coral Gables | Miami | 7 | Florida | 6 |
| 123 | February 15, 1986 | Coral Gables | Miami | 7 | Florida | 6^{10} |
| 124 | March 11, 1986 | Gainesville | Miami | 6 | Florida | 5 |

| No. | Date | Location | Winning team | | Losing team | |
|---|---|---|---|---|---|---|
| 125 | March 12, 1986 | Gainesville | Miami | 9 | Florida | 7 |
| 126 | February 27, 1987 | Coral Gables | Miami | 4 | Florida | 2 |
| 127 | February 28, 1987 | Coral Gables | Miami | 12 | Florida | 4 |
| 128 | April 21, 1987 | Gainesville | Florida | 3 | Miami | 2 |
| 129 | April 22, 1987 | Gainesville | Florida | 6 | Miami | 5 |
| 130 | February 20, 1988 | Gainesville | Florida | 3 | Miami | 2^{7} |
| 131 | February 21, 1988 | Gainesville | Miami | 9 | Florida | 7 |
| 132 | April 1, 1988 | Coral Gables | Miami | 11 | Florida | 3 |
| 133 | April 2, 1988 | Coral Gables | Miami | 5 | Florida | 3 |
| 134 | March 21, 1989 | Coral Gables | Florida | 13 | Miami | 10 |
| 135 | March 22, 1989 | Coral Gables | Miami | 4 | Florida | 0 |
| 136 | April 1, 1989 | Gainesville | Florida | 7 | Miami | 1 |
| 137 | April 2, 1989 | Gainesville | Florida | 3 | Miami | 2 |
| 138 | May 27, 1989† | Gainesville | Miami | 9 | Florida | 1 |
| 139 | February 23, 1990 | Coral Gables | Florida | 5 | Miami | 4 |
| 140 | February 24, 1990 | Coral Gables | Miami | 12 | Florida | 10 |
| 141 | March 3, 1990 | Gainesville | Miami | 6 | Florida | 3 |
| 142 | March 4, 1990 | Gainesville | Miami | 8 | Florida | 3 |
| 143 | February 23, 1991 | Gainesville | Miami | 5 | Florida | 3 |
| 144 | February 24, 1991 | Gainesville | Miami | 8 | Florida | 7 |
| 145 | February 26, 1991 | Coral Gables | Miami | 4 | Florida | 2 |
| 146 | February 27, 1991 | Coral Gables | Miami | 8 | Florida | 7^{10} |
| 147 | February 22, 1992 | Gainesville | Florida | 7 | Miami | 2 |
| 148 | February 23, 1992 | Gainesville | Florida | 8 | Miami | 5 |
| 149 | March 6, 1992 | Coral Gables | Miami | 7 | Florida | 1 |
| 150 | March 7, 1992 | Coral Gables | Miami | 6 | Florida | 5 |
| 151 | February 27, 1993 | Gainesville | Florida | 3 | Miami | 2 |
| 152 | February 28, 1993 | Gainesville | Florida | 9 | Miami | 7 |
| 153 | March 12, 1993 | Coral Gables | Miami | 7 | Florida | 1 |
| 154 | March 13, 1993 | Coral Gables | Florida | 4 | Miami | 3^{10} |
| 155 | February 19, 1994 | Gainesville | Miami | 4 | Florida | 3 |

| No. | Date | Location | Winning team | | Losing team | |
|---|---|---|---|---|---|---|
| 156 | February 20, 1994 | Gainesville | Florida | 5 | Miami | 0 |
| 157 | March 11, 1994 | Coral Gables | Miami | 4 | Florida | 3 |
| 158 | March 12, 1994 | Coral Gables | Miami | 4 | Florida | 2^{10} |
| 159 | May 30, 1994† | Coral Gables | Miami | 10 | Florida | 6 |
| 160 | February 4, 1995 | Gainesville | Florida | 5 | Miami | 3 |
| 161 | February 5, 1995 | Gainesville | Miami | 10 | Florida | 2 |
| 162 | February 17, 1995 | Coral Gables | Miami | 5 | Florida | 4^{16} |
| 163 | February 18, 1995 | Coral Gables | Florida | 4 | Miami | 2 |
| 164 | February 2, 1995 | Coral Gables | Florida | 7 | Miami | 4 |
| 165 | February 3, 1996 | Coral Gables | Miami | 5 | Florida | 1 |
| 166 | February 24, 1996 | Gainesville | Florida | 8 | Miami | 7 |
| 167 | February 25, 1996 | Gainesville | Florida | 5 | Miami | 1 |
| 168 | February 15, 1997 | Gainesville | Florida | 2 | Miami | 1 |
| 169 | February 16, 1997 | Gainesville | Florida | 12 | Miami | 5 |
| 170 | February 21, 1997 | Coral Gables | Miami | 8 | Florida | 7 |
| 171 | February 22, 1997 | Coral Gables | Miami | 4 | Florida | 1 |
| 172 | May 24, 1997† | Coral Gables | Miami | 6 | Florida | 5 |
| 173 | February 7, 1998 | Coral Gables | Miami | 6 | Florida | 5 |
| 174 | February 8, 1998 | Coral Gables | Miami | 17 | Florida | 11 |
| 175 | February 14, 1998 | Gainesville | Florida | 19 | Miami | 5 |
| 176 | February 15, 1998 | Gainesville | Florida | 14 | Miami | 10 |
| 177 | February 6, 1999 | Gainesville | Florida | 7 | Miami | 4 |
| 178 | February 7, 1999 | Gainesville | Florida | 14 | Miami | 12 |
| 179 | February 12, 1999 | Coral Gables | Miami | 7 | Florida | 4 |
| 180 | February 13, 1999 | Coral Gables | Miami | 10 | Florida | 3 |
| 181 | February 4, 2000 | Coral Gables | Miami | 16 | Florida | 8 |
| 182 | February 5, 2000 | Coral Gables | Miami | 17 | Florida | 1 |
| 183 | February 12, 2000 | Gainesville | Florida | 4 | Miami | 3 |
| 184 | February 13, 2000 | Gainesville | Florida | 20 | Miami | 11 |
| 185 | February 3, 2001 | Gainesville | Miami | 14 | Florida | 5 |
| 186 | February 9, 2001 | Coral Gables | Miami | 10 | Florida | 4 |

| No. | Date | Location | Winning team | | Losing team | |
|---|---|---|---|---|---|---|
| 187 | February 10, 2001 | Coral Gables | Miami | 8 | Florida | 7 |
| 188 | May 26, 2001† | Coral Gables | Miami | 6 | Florida | 2 |
| 189 | February 8, 2002 | Coral Gables | Florida | 12 | Miami | 9 |
| 190 | February 10, 2002 | Coral Gables | Florida | 6 | Miami | 2 |
| 191 | June 1, 2002† | Gainesville | Miami | 7 | Florida | 2 |
| 192 | June 2, 2002† | Gainesville | Florida | 11 | Miami | 10^{10} |
| 193 | June 2, 2002† | Gainesville | Miami | 8 | Florida | 7 |
| 194 | February 14, 2003 | Gainesville | Miami | 9 | Florida | 2 |
| 195 | February 15, 2003 | Gainesville | Florida | 5 | Miami | 3 |
| 196 | June 1, 2003† | Coral Gables | Florida | 15 | Miami | 5 |
| 197 | June 1, 2003† | Coral Gables | Miami | 10 | Florida | 3 |
| 198 | February 13, 2004 | Coral Gables | Florida | 3 | Miami | 0 |
| 199 | February 14, 2004 | Coral Gables | Miami | 4 | Florida | 1 |
| 200 | February 15, 2004 | Coral Gables | Miami | 19 | Florida | 5 |
| 201 | June 12, 2004† | Coral Gables | Miami | 8 | Florida | 7 |
| 202 | June 13, 2004† | Coral Gables | Miami | 3 | Florida | 1 |
| 203 | February 18, 2005 | Gainesville | Miami | 9 | Florida | 7 |
| 204 | February 19, 2005 | Gainesville | Florida | 2 | Miami | 1^{11} |
| 205 | February 20, 2005 | Gainesville | Florida | 14 | Miami | 11 |
| 206 | February 17, 2006 | Coral Gables | Florida | 2 | Miami | 1 |
| 207 | February 18, 2006 | Coral Gables | Florida | 4 | Miami | 1 |
| 208 | February 19, 2006 | Coral Gables | Florida | 11 | Miami | 10 |
| 209 | February 16, 2007 | Gainesville | Florida | 7 | Miami | 2 |
| 210 | February 17, 2007 | Gainesville | Florida | 7 | Miami | 5 |
| 211 | February 18, 2007 | Gainesville | Miami | 10 | Florida | 7 |
| 212 | February 29, 2008 | Coral Gables | Miami | 8 | Florida | 4 |
| 213 | March 1, 2008 | Coral Gables | Miami | 8 | Florida | 5 |
| 214 | March 2, 2008 | Coral Gables | Florida | 6 | Miami | 2 |
| 215 | February 27, 2009 | Gainesville | Miami | 8 | Florida | 5 |
| 216 | February 28, 2009 | Gainesville | Miami | 2 | Florida | 1 |
| 217 | March 1, 2009 | Gainesville | Miami | 16 | Florida | 2 |

| No. | Date | Location | Winning team | | Losing team | |
|---|---|---|---|---|---|---|
| 218 | May 30, 2009† | Gainesville | Florida | 8 | Miami | 2 |
| 219 | May 31, 2009† | Gainesville | Florida | 16 | Miami | 5 |
| 220 | March 5, 2010 | Coral Gables | Florida | 7 | Miami | 1 |
| 221 | March 6, 2010 | Coral Gables | Miami | 9 | Florida | 6 |
| 222 | March 7, 2010 | Coral Gables | Florida | 4 | Miami | 2 |
| 223 | June 11, 2010† | Gainesville | Florida | 4 | Miami | 2 |
| 224 | June 12, 2010† | Gainesville | Florida | 4 | Miami | 3^{10} |
| 225 | March 4, 2011 | Gainesville | Florida | 8 | Miami | 3 |
| 226 | March 5, 2011 | Gainesville | Florida | 1 | Miami | 0 |
| 227 | March 6, 2011 | Gainesville | Florida | 5 | Miami | 3 |
| 228 | June 4, 2011† | Gainesville | Florida | 5 | Miami | 4 |
| 229 | June 5, 2011† | Gainesville | Florida | 11 | Miami | 4 |
| 230 | March 2, 2012 | Coral Gables | Florida | 7 | Miami | 5 |
| 231 | March 3, 2012 | Coral Gables | Florida | 13 | Miami | 5 |
| 232 | March 4, 2012 | Coral Gables | Florida | 8 | Miami | 5 |
| 233 | March 1, 2013 | Gainesville | Miami | 3 | Florida | 2 |
| 234 | March 2, 2013 | Gainesville | Florida | 6 | Miami | 4 |
| 235 | March 3, 2013 | Gainesville | Florida | 6 | Miami | 3 |
| 236 | February 21, 2014 | Coral Gables | Miami | 6 | Florida | 4 |
| 237 | February 22, 2014 | Coral Gables | Miami | 5 | Florida | 2 |
| 238 | February 23, 2014 | Coral Gables | Florida | 6 | Miami | 4 |
| 239 | February 20, 2015 | Gainesville | Florida | 4 | Miami | 3 |
| 240 | February 21, 2015 | Gainesville | Miami | 7 | Florida | 2 |
| 241 | February 22, 2015 | Gainesville | Florida | 2 | Miami | 1 |
| 242 | June 13, 2015†† | Omaha | Florida | 15 | Miami | 3 |
| 243 | June 17, 2015†† | Omaha | Florida | 10 | Miami | 2 |
| 244 | February 26, 2016 | Coral Gables | Florida | 5 | Miami | 0 |
| 245 | February 27, 2016 | Coral Gables | Miami | 5 | Florida | 3 |
| 246 | February 28, 2016 | Coral Gables | Florida | 7 | Miami | 3 |
| 247 | February 24, 2017 | Gainesville | Florida | 1 | Miami | 0 |
| 248 | February 25, 2017 | Gainesville | Florida | 2 | Miami | 0 |

| No. | Date | Location | Winning team | | Losing team | |
|---|---|---|---|---|---|---|
| 249 | February 26, 2017 | Gainesville | Florida | 6 | Miami | 2 |
| 250 | February 23, 2018 | Coral Gables | Florida | 7 | Miami | 3 |
| 251 | February 24, 2018 | Coral Gables | Florida | 8 | Miami | 2 |
| 252 | February 25, 2018 | Coral Gables | Miami | 2 | Florida | 0 |
| 253 | February 22, 2019 | Gainesville | Miami | 5 | Florida | 2 |
| 254 | February 23, 2019 | Gainesville | Florida | 9 | Miami | 3 |
| 255 | February 24, 2019 | Gainesville | Florida | 4 | Miami | 1 |
| 256 | February 21, 2020 | Coral Gables | Florida | 2 | Miami | 1 |
| 257 | February 22, 2020 | Coral Gables | Florida | 7 | Miami | 4 |
| 258 | February 23, 2020 | Coral Gables | Florida | 5 | Miami | 3 |
| 259 | February 19, 2021 | Gainesville | Florida | 7 | Miami | 5 |
| 260 | February 20, 2021 | Gainesville | Miami | 10 | Florida | 9^{13} |
| 261 | February 21, 2021 | Gainesville | Miami | 8 | Florida | 6 |
| 262 | March 4, 2022 | Coral Gables | Miami | 5 | Florida | 2 |
| 263 | March 5, 2022 | Coral Gables | Florida | 8 | Miami | 1 |
| 264 | March 6, 2022 | Coral Gables | Florida | 11 | Miami | 3 |
| 265 | March 3, 2023 | Gainesville | Florida | 10 | Miami | 4 |
| 266 | March 4, 2023 | Gainesville | Miami | 14 | Florida | 6 |
| 267 | March 5, 2023 | Gainesville | Florida | 14 | Miami | 4^{8} |
| 268 | March 1, 2024 | Coral Gables | Florida | 7 | Miami | 3 |
| 269 | March 2, 2024 | Coral Gables | Miami | 10 | Florida | 6 |
| 270 | March 3, 2024 | Coral Gables | Florida | 8 | Miami | 4 |
| 271 | February 28, 2025 | Gainesville | Florida | 6 | Miami | 2 |
| 272 | March 1, 2025 | Gainesville | Florida | 6 | Miami | 3 |
| 273 | March 2, 2025 | Gainesville | Miami | 13 | Florida | 7 |
| 274 | February 27, 2026 | Coral Gables | Florida | 7 | Miami | 2 |
| 275 | February 28, 2026 | Coral Gables | Florida | 8 | Miami | 4 |
| 276 | May 30, 2026† | Gainesville | Florida | 22 | Miami | 10 |
Series: Florida leads 139–136–1
† NCAA Division I baseball tournament ††College World Series
