= 2023 College Baseball All-America Team =

This is a list of college baseball players named first team All-Americans for the 2023 NCAA Division I baseball season. From 2019 to 2023, there were seven generally recognized All-America selectors for baseball: the American Baseball Coaches Association, Baseball America, Collegiate Baseball Newspaper, the College Baseball Foundation, D1Baseball.com, the National Collegiate Baseball Writers Association, and Perfect Game. In order to be considered a "consensus" All-American, a player must have been selected by at least four of these.

== Key ==
A	American Baseball Coaches Association
B	Baseball America
C	Collegiate Baseball Newspaper
F	College Baseball Foundation
D	D1Baseball.com
N	National Collegiate Baseball Writers Association
P	Perfect Game
	Member of the National College Baseball Hall of Fame
	Consensus All-American – selected by all seven organizations
	Consensus All-American – selected by four, five, or six organizations

== All-Americans ==
Position	Name	School	#	A	B	C	F	D	N	P	Other awards and honors
Starting pitcher	Connelly Early	Virginia	1	—	—	—	—	—	✓	—	
Starting pitcher	Lucas Gordon	Texas	1	—	—	✓	—	—	—	—	
Starting pitcher	Tanner Hall	Southern Miss	5	—	✓	✓	—	✓	✓	✓	
Starting pitcher	Josh Hartle	Wake Forest	4	—	✓	—	—	✓	✓	✓	
Starting pitcher	Rhett Lowder	Wake Forest	7	✓	✓	✓	✓	✓	✓	✓	
Starting pitcher	Quinn Mathews	Stanford	5	✓	—	—	✓	✓	✓	✓	
Starting pitcher	Paul Skenes	LSU	7	✓	✓	✓	✓	✓	✓	✓	Dick Howser Trophy ABCA Pitcher of the Year Baseball America Player of the Year Collegiate Baseball Player of the Year National Pitcher of the Year College World Series Most Outstanding Player First overall pick in the 2023 MLB draft
Starting pitcher	Hagen Smith	Arkansas	2	—	—	✓	—	—	✓	—	
Starting pitcher	Joe Whitman	Kent State	1	—	—	✓	—	—	—	—	
Relief pitcher	Kyle Amendt	Dallas Baptist	1	—	—	—	—	—	✓	—	
Relief pitcher	Cade Denton	Oral Roberts	4	✓	✓	—	—	—	✓	✓	Stopper of the Year
Relief pitcher	Brandon Neely	Florida	1	—	—	—	✓	—	—	—	
Relief pitcher	Tyson Neighbors	Kansas State	3	—	—	—	✓	✓	✓	—	
Relief pitcher	James Tallion	Duke	1	—	—	—	—	—	✓	—	
Relief pitcher	Andrew Walters	Miami (FL)	7	✓	✓	✓	✓	✓	✓	✓	
Catcher	Cole Messina	South Carolina	1	—	—	—	✓	—	—	—	
Catcher	Kyle Teel	Virginia	7	✓	✓	✓	✓	✓	✓	✓	Buster Posey Award Johnny Bench Award
First baseman	Nick Kurtz	Wake Forest	2	✓	—	—	✓	—	—	—	
First baseman	Nolan Schanuel	Florida Atlantic	5	✓	✓	✓	—	✓	—	✓	
Second baseman	Max Anderson	Nebraska	1	—	—	—	✓	—	—	—	
Second baseman	Brock Rodden	Wichita State	1	—	—	—	✓	—	—	—	
Second baseman	JJ Wetherholt	West Virginia	7	✓	✓	✓	✓	✓	✓	✓	
Shortstop	Josh Rivera	Florida	1	—	—	—	✓	—	—	—	
Shortstop	Matt Shaw	Maryland	7	✓	✓	✓	✓	✓	✓	✓	Brooks Wallace Award
Third baseman	Jake Gelof	Virginia	1	—	—	—	✓	—	—	—	
Third baseman	Tommy Troy	Stanford	1	—	—	—	—	—	—	✓	
Third baseman / DH	Tommy White	LSU	4	—	✓	✓	—	—	✓	✓	
Third baseman	Brock Wilken	Wake Forest	4	✓	—	—	✓	✓	—	✓	
Outfielder	Charlie Condon	Georgia	1	—	—	—	—	—	✓	—	
Outfielder	Jonah Cox	Oral Roberts	4	✓	—	✓	✓	—	—	✓	
Outfielder	Dylan Crews	LSU	7	✓	✓	✓	✓	✓	✓	✓	Golden Spikes Award
Outfielder	Cam Fisher	Charlotte	1	✓	—	—	—	—	—	—	
Outfielder	Mac Horvath	North Carolina	1	—	—	—	—	—	—	✓	
Outfielder	Wyatt Langford	Florida	6	✓	✓	—	✓	✓	✓	✓	
Outfielder	Ethan Petry	South Carolina	1	—	—	—	—	—	✓	—	
Outfielder	Alberto Rios	Stanford	5	✓	✓	✓	—	✓	✓	—	
Designated hitter	Billy Amick	Clemson	3	—	—	✓	✓	—	✓	—	
Designated hitter	Derek Bender	Coastal Carolina	1	✓	—	—	—	—	—	—	
Designated hitter	Hunter Hines	Mississippi State	1	—	—	—	✓	—	—	—	
Utility / DH / 1B	Jac Caglianone	Florida	6	✓	✓	—	✓	✓	✓	✓	ABCA Position Player of the Year
Utility Player	Caden Grice	Clemson	6	✓	✓	✓	✓	✓	✓	—	John Olerud Award
Utility Player	Payton Tolle	Wichita State	1	—	—	—	✓	—	—	—	

== See also ==
- List of college baseball awards
