= 2023 Atlantic Coast Conference baseball tournament =

American college baseball tournament

- Teams: 12
- Format: See below
- Finals site: Durham Bulls Athletic Park; Durham, North Carolina
- Champions: Clemson (11th title)
- Winning coach: Erik Bakich (1st title)
- MVP: Caden Grice (Clemson)
- Attendance: 37,930
- Television: ACC Network (Tues-Sat); ESPN2 (Championship)

2023 Atlantic Coast Conference baseball standings
	Conf.				Overall
Team	W		L	PCT	W		L	PCT
Atlantic
No. 3 Wake Forest ^{x}‍‍‍^{y}	22	–	7	.759	54	–	12	.818
No. 18 Clemson ‍‍‡‍^{y}	20	–	10	.667	44	–	19	.698
Boston College ‍‍‍^{y}	16	–	14	.533	37	–	20	.649
Notre Dame ‍‍‍	15	–	15	.500	30	–	24	.556
NC State ‍‍‍^{y}	13	–	16	.448	36	–	21	.632
Louisville ‍‍‍	10	–	20	.333	31	–	24	.564
Florida State ‍‍‍	9	–	21	.300	23	–	31	.426
Coastal
No. 6 Virginia ^{x}‍‍‍^{y}	19	–	11	.633	50	–	13	.794
No. 20 Miami (FL) ‍‍‍^{y}	18	–	12	.600	42	–	21	.667
No. 15 Duke ‍‍‍^{y}	16	–	13	.552	39	–	23	.629
North Carolina ‍‍‍^{y}	14	–	14	.500	36	–	24	.600
Virginia Tech ‍‍‍	12	–	17	.414	30	–	23	.566
Georgia Tech ‍‍‍	12	–	18	.400	30	–	27	.526
Pittsburgh ‍‍‍	10	–	18	.357	24	–	31	.436
x – Division champion ‡ – Tournament champion y – Invited to the NCAA tournament As of June 25, 2023; Rankings from D1Baseball

The 2023 Atlantic Coast Conference baseball tournament was held May 23–28, 2023 at Durham Bulls Athletic Park in Durham, North Carolina. The annual tournament determines the official conference champion of the Division I Atlantic Coast Conference for college baseball. In the championship game, the Clemson Tigers defeated the Miami Hurricanes, 11–5, earning the league's automatic bid to the 2023 NCAA Division I baseball tournament. Due to inclement weather, one game, the first semifinal, was hosted at Boshamer Stadium in Chapel Hill, North Carolina.

Since its inception in 1973, the tournament has been held every year except twice, with Clemson securing ten championships prior to this, the most in the tournament's history. Georgia Tech has won nine championships, and Florida State has won eight titles since it entered the league in 1992, matching defending champion North Carolina's total. Recent entrants, including Virginia Tech, Boston College, Pittsburgh, Notre Dame, and Louisville, have never won the event.

== Format and seeding ==
The winner of each seven team division and the top ten other teams based on conference winning percentage, regardless of division, from the conference's regular season will be seeded one through twelve. Seeds one and two are awarded to the two division winners. Teams are then divided into four pools of three teams each, with the winners advancing to single elimination bracket for the championship.

If a 1–1 tie were to occur among all three teams in a pool, the highest seeded team would have advanced to the semifinals. Because of this, seeds 5–12 must win both pool play games to advance to the single-elimination bracket, and seeds 1–4 must only win the game against the winner of the game between the other two teams in the pool to advance. For example, if the 12 seed beats the 8 seed in the first game, then the winner of the 12 seed versus 1 seed advances, and the 8 seed versus 1 seed game has no effect on which team advances.

Team	W–L	Pct	GB #1	Seed
Atlantic Division
Wake Forest	22–7	.759	–	1
Clemson	20–10	.667	2.5	3
Boston College	16–14	.533	6.5	6
Notre Dame	15–15	.500	7.5	8
NC State	13–16	.448	9	9
Louisville	10–20	.333	12.5	–
Florida State	9–21	.300	13.5	–

Team	W–L	Pct	GB #1	Seed
Coastal Division
Virginia	19–11	.633	3.5	2
Miami (FL)	18–12	.600	4.5	4
Duke	16–13	.552	6	5
North Carolina	14–14	.500	7.5	7
Virginia Tech	12–17	.414	10	10
Georgia Tech	12–18	.400	10.5	11
Pittsburgh	10–18	.357	11.5	12

Tiebreakers
Teams	Record	Tiebreaker 1
(7) North Carolina (8) Notre Dame	14–14; 15–15	UNC 2–1; UND 1–2

- Two-way tie broken by combined head-to-head records.
- Three-way tie broken by combined head-to-head records.
- If a tie remains after the first tiebreaker, the two-way tiebreaker is used.

== Schedule and results ==
=== Schedule ===
Game	Time*	Matchup^{#}	Score	Television	Attendance	Reference
Tuesday, May 23
1	11:00 a.m.	No. 10 Virginia Tech vs. No. 6 Boston College	7–11	ACCN	2,048	
2	3:00 p.m.	No. 11 Georgia Tech vs. No. 7 North Carolina	5–11	ACCN	2,048	
3	7:00 p.m.	No. 9 NC State vs. No. 5 Duke	8–7 (13)	ACCN	3,894	
Wednesday, May 24
4	11:00 a.m.	No. 12 Pittsburgh vs. No. 8 Notre Dame	9–5	ACCN	2,086	
5	3:00 p.m.	No. 2 Virginia vs. No. 11 Georgia Tech	15–1 (7)	ACCN	2,086	
6	7:00 p.m.	No. 3 Clemson vs. No. 10 Virginia Tech	14–5	ACCN	2,398	
Thursday, May 25
7	11:00 a.m.	No 1. Wake Forest vs. No. 12 Pittsburgh	10–2	ACCN	3,322	
8	3:00 p.m.	No. 7 North Carolina vs. No. 2 Virginia	10–2	ACCN	4,084	
9	7:00 p.m.	No. 4 Miami (FL) vs. No. 9 NC State	4–2	ACCN	4,253	
Friday, May 26
10	11:00 a.m.	No. 6 Boston College vs. No. 3 Clemson	1–4	ACCN	3,348	
11	3:00 p.m.	No. 5 Duke vs. No. 4 Miami (FL)	6–7	ACCN	3,348	
12	7:00 p.m.	No. 8 Notre Dame vs. No. 1 Wake Forest	5–7	ACCN	3,862	
Saturday, May 27
Semifinal 1	1:00 p.m.	No. 1 Wake Forest vs. No. 4 Miami (FL)	2–7	ACCNX^{α}	696	
Semifinal 2	1:00 p.m.^{β}	No. 7 North Carolina vs. No. 3 Clemson	4–10	ACCN	3,147	
Championship – Sunday, May 28
Championship	12:00 p.m.	No. 3 Clemson vs. No. 4 Miami (FL)	11–5	ESPN2	4,792	
*Game times in EDT. # – Rankings denote tournament seed.

==== Notes ====
^α Game moved to ACCNX and Boshamer Stadium due to forecast inclement weather.
^β Game moved from 5:00 p.m. due to forecast inclement weather.

=== Pool A ===
Pos	Team	Pld	W	L	RF	RA	RD	PCT	Qualification
1	(1) Wake Forest	2	2	0	17	7	+10	1.000	Advance to Playoff round
2	(12) Pittsburgh	2	1	1	11	15	−4	.500	
3	(8) Notre Dame	2	0	2	10	16	−6	.000	

Source: ACC

May 24; 11:00 a.m. ET; Game 4	(12) Pittsburgh	9–5	(8) Notre Dame	Durham Bulls Athletic Park; Attendance: 2,086; Umpires: Doug Vines; Brian Miller; Mike Jarboe; Perry Costello
May 24; 11:00 a.m. ET; Game 4	WP: Simmons (2–2); Sv: N. Bryan (8)	Boxscore	LP: A. Tyrell (8–3)	Durham Bulls Athletic Park; Attendance: 2,086; Umpires: Doug Vines; Brian Miller; Mike Jarboe; Perry Costello
May 24; 11:00 a.m. ET; Game 4	HR: S. Duff (5), N. Martinez (13), K. Hess (10), J. Acal (10), D. Popa (1)	Boxscore		Durham Bulls Athletic Park; Attendance: 2,086; Umpires: Doug Vines; Brian Miller; Mike Jarboe; Perry Costello

May 25; 11:00 a.m. ET; Game 7	(1) Wake Forest	10–2	(12) Pittsburgh	Durham Bulls Athletic Park; Attendance: 3,322; Umpires: Blake Felix; Perry Costello; Adam Dowdy; Linus Baker
May 25; 11:00 a.m. ET; Game 7	WP: R. Lowder (13–0); Sv: None	Boxscore	LP: L. Evans (5–3)	Durham Bulls Athletic Park; Attendance: 3,322; Umpires: Blake Felix; Perry Costello; Adam Dowdy; Linus Baker
May 25; 11:00 a.m. ET; Game 7	HR: B. Wilken (26), B. Lee (6), D. Corona (7)	Boxscore	HR: D. Popa (2)	Durham Bulls Athletic Park; Attendance: 3,322; Umpires: Blake Felix; Perry Costello; Adam Dowdy; Linus Baker

May 26; 7:00 p.m. ET; Game 12	(8) Notre Dame	5–7	(1) Wake Forest	Durham Bulls Athletic Park; Attendance: 3,862; Umpires: Travis Carlson; Blake Felix; Greg Street; Jeff Gosney
May 26; 7:00 p.m. ET; Game 12	LP: J. Dennies (0–4)	Boxscore	WP: D. Crum (1–0); Sv: C. Roland (2)	Durham Bulls Athletic Park; Attendance: 3,862; Umpires: Travis Carlson; Blake Felix; Greg Street; Jeff Gosney
May 26; 7:00 p.m. ET; Game 12		Boxscore	HR: N. Kurtz 2 (23), B. Wilken (27)	Durham Bulls Athletic Park; Attendance: 3,862; Umpires: Travis Carlson; Blake Felix; Greg Street; Jeff Gosney

=== Pool B ===
Pos	Team	Pld	W	L	RF	RA	RD	PCT	Qualification
1	(7) North Carolina	2	2	0	21	7	+14	1.000	Advance to Playoff round
2	(2) Virginia	2	1	1	17	11	+6	.500	
3	(11) Georgia Tech	2	0	2	6	26	−20	.000	

Source: ACC

May 23; 3:00 p.m. ET; Game 2	(11) Georgia Tech	5–11	(7) North Carolina	Durham Bulls Athletic Park; Attendance: 2,048; Umpires: Perry Costello; Travis Carlson; Doug Vines; Brian Miller
May 23; 3:00 p.m. ET; Game 2	LP: B. King (6–2)	Boxscore	WP: B. Peterson (3–0); Sv: M. Poston (5)	Durham Bulls Athletic Park; Attendance: 2,048; Umpires: Perry Costello; Travis Carlson; Doug Vines; Brian Miller
May 23; 3:00 p.m. ET; Game 2	HR: J. Giesler (8)	Boxscore	HR: M. Horvath (22)	Durham Bulls Athletic Park; Attendance: 2,048; Umpires: Perry Costello; Travis Carlson; Doug Vines; Brian Miller

May 24; 3:00 p.m. ET; Game 5	(2) Virginia	15–1 (F/7)	(11) Georgia Tech	Durham Bulls Athletic Park; Attendance: 2,086; Umpires: Linus Baker; Ryan Clark; Blake Felix; Greg Street
May 24; 3:00 p.m. ET; Game 5	WP: N. Parker (7–0); Sv: None	Boxscore	LP: A. Finateri (2–4)	Durham Bulls Athletic Park; Attendance: 2,086; Umpires: Linus Baker; Ryan Clark; Blake Felix; Greg Street
May 24; 3:00 p.m. ET; Game 5	HR: E. O'Donnell (12), K. Teel (12), E. Anderson (10)	Boxscore	HR: A. Dispigna (16)	Durham Bulls Athletic Park; Attendance: 2,086; Umpires: Linus Baker; Ryan Clark; Blake Felix; Greg Street

May 25; 3:00 p.m. ET; Game 8	(7) North Carolina	10–2	(2) Virginia	Durham Bulls Athletic Park; Attendance: 4,084; Umpires: Brian Miller; Mike Jarboe; Craig Barron; Doug Vines
May 25; 3:00 p.m. ET; Game 8	WP: J. Knapp (5–3); Sv: D. Pence (1)	Boxscore	LP: C. Early (10–2)	Durham Bulls Athletic Park; Attendance: 4,084; Umpires: Brian Miller; Mike Jarboe; Craig Barron; Doug Vines
May 25; 3:00 p.m. ET; Game 8		Boxscore	HR: E. Anderson (11)	Durham Bulls Athletic Park; Attendance: 4,084; Umpires: Brian Miller; Mike Jarboe; Craig Barron; Doug Vines

=== Pool C ===
Pos	Team	Pld	W	L	RF	RA	RD	PCT	Qualification
1	(3) Clemson	2	2	0	18	6	+12	1.000	Advance to Playoff round
2	(6) Boston College	2	1	1	12	11	+1	.500	
3	(10) Virginia Tech	2	0	2	12	25	−13	.000	

Source: ACC

May 23; 11:00 a.m. ET; Game 1	(6) Virginia Tech	7–11	(10) Boston College	Durham Bulls Athletic Park; Attendance: 2,048; Umpires: Ryan Clark; Mike Jarobe; Linus Baker; Blake Felix
May 23; 11:00 a.m. ET; Game 1	LP: H. Weycker (3–3)	Boxscore	WP: H. Leake (4–5); Sv: A. Roman (9)	Durham Bulls Athletic Park; Attendance: 2,048; Umpires: Ryan Clark; Mike Jarobe; Linus Baker; Blake Felix
May 23; 11:00 a.m. ET; Game 1	HR: C. Jones (14)	Boxscore	HR: B. Walsh (6)	Durham Bulls Athletic Park; Attendance: 2,048; Umpires: Ryan Clark; Mike Jarobe; Linus Baker; Blake Felix

May 24; 7:00 p.m. ET; Game 6	(3) Clemson	14–5	(10) Virginia Tech	Durham Bulls Athletic Park; Attendance: 2,398; Umpires: Jeff Gosney; Adam Dowdy; Travis Carlson; Craig Barron
May 24; 7:00 p.m. ET; Game 6	WP: BJ Bailey (2–2); Sv: None	Boxscore	LP: D. Hackenberg (5–8)	Durham Bulls Athletic Park; Attendance: 2,398; Umpires: Jeff Gosney; Adam Dowdy; Travis Carlson; Craig Barron
May 24; 7:00 p.m. ET; Game 6	HR: C. Grice (15)	Boxscore		Durham Bulls Athletic Park; Attendance: 2,398; Umpires: Jeff Gosney; Adam Dowdy; Travis Carlson; Craig Barron

May 26; 11:00 a.m. ET; Game 10	(6) Boston College	1–4	(3) Clemson	Durham Bulls Athletic Park; Attendance: 3,348; Umpires: Mike Jarboe; Doug Vines; Perry Costello; Blake Felix
May 26; 11:00 a.m. ET; Game 10	LP: C. Flynn (7–3)	Boxscore	WP: A. Gordon (2–4); Sv: R. Ammons (5)	Durham Bulls Athletic Park; Attendance: 3,348; Umpires: Mike Jarboe; Doug Vines; Perry Costello; Blake Felix
May 26; 11:00 a.m. ET; Game 10	HR: N. Wang (10)	Boxscore	HR: C. Grice (16)	Durham Bulls Athletic Park; Attendance: 3,348; Umpires: Mike Jarboe; Doug Vines; Perry Costello; Blake Felix

=== Pool D ===
Pos	Team	Pld	W	L	RF	RA	RD	PCT	Qualification
1	(4) Miami (FL)	2	2	0	11	8	+3	1.000	Advance to Playoff round
2	(9) NC State	2	1	1	10	11	−1	.500	
3	(5) Duke	2	0	2	13	15	−2	.000	

Source: ACC

May 23; 7:00 p.m. ET; Game 3	(9) NC State	8–7 (F/11)	(5) Duke	Durham Bulls Athletic Park; Attendance: 3,894; Umpires: Craig Barron; Greg Street; Jeff Gosney; Adam Dowdy
May 23; 7:00 p.m. ET; Game 3	WP: L. Whitaker (5–3); Sv: None	Boxscore	LP: J. Romano (1–1)	Durham Bulls Athletic Park; Attendance: 3,894; Umpires: Craig Barron; Greg Street; Jeff Gosney; Adam Dowdy
May 23; 7:00 p.m. ET; Game 3	HR: L. Groover (11)	Boxscore	HR: MJ Metz (13)	Durham Bulls Athletic Park; Attendance: 3,894; Umpires: Craig Barron; Greg Street; Jeff Gosney; Adam Dowdy

May 25; 7:00 p.m. ET; Game 9	(4) Miami (FL)	4–2	(9) NC State	Durham Bulls Athletic Park; Attendance: 4,253; Umpires: Greg Street; Jeff Gosney; Ryan Clark; Travis Carlson
May 25; 7:00 p.m. ET; Game 9	WP: R. Schlesinger (3–1); Sv: A. Walters (10)	Boxscore	LP: S. Highfill (6–3)	Durham Bulls Athletic Park; Attendance: 4,253; Umpires: Greg Street; Jeff Gosney; Ryan Clark; Travis Carlson
May 25; 7:00 p.m. ET; Game 9	HR: E. Villegas (6)	Boxscore		Durham Bulls Athletic Park; Attendance: 4,253; Umpires: Greg Street; Jeff Gosney; Ryan Clark; Travis Carlson

May 26; 3:00 p.m. ET; Game 11	(5) Duke	6–7	(4) Miami (FL)	Durham Bulls Athletic Park; Umpires: Adam Dowdy; Ryan Clark; Craig Barron; Brian Miller
May 26; 3:00 p.m. ET; Game 11	LP: J. Tallon (1–1)	Boxscore	WP: C. Lequerica (5–1); Sv: A. Walters (11)	Durham Bulls Athletic Park; Umpires: Adam Dowdy; Ryan Clark; Craig Barron; Brian Miller
May 26; 3:00 p.m. ET; Game 11	HR: J. Beshears (12), A. Stone (14), L. Storm 2 (13)	Boxscore	HR: CJ Kayfus (13), Y. Morales (14)	Durham Bulls Athletic Park; Umpires: Adam Dowdy; Ryan Clark; Craig Barron; Brian Miller

== Playoffs ==
Semifinals
1	Wake Forest	2
4	Miami	7
7	North Carolina	4
3	Clemson	10

Finals
4	Miami	5
3	Clemson	11

=== Semifinals ===
May 27; 1:00 p.m. ET; Semifinal 1	(1) Wake Forest	2–7	(4) Miami (FL)	Boshamer Stadium; Attendance: 696; Umpires: Perry Costello; Adam Dowdy; Brian Miller; Craig Barron
May 27; 1:00 p.m. ET; Semifinal 1	LP: S. Sullivan (5–3)	Boxscore	WP: A. Rosario (4–6); Sv: None	Boshamer Stadium; Attendance: 696; Umpires: Perry Costello; Adam Dowdy; Brian Miller; Craig Barron
May 27; 1:00 p.m. ET; Semifinal 1	HR: None	Boxscore	HR: Y. Morales 2 (16)	Boshamer Stadium; Attendance: 696; Umpires: Perry Costello; Adam Dowdy; Brian Miller; Craig Barron

May 27; 1:00 p.m. ET; Semifinal 2	(7) North Carolina	4–10	(3) Clemson	Durham Bulls Athletic Park; Attendance: 3,147; Umpires: Jeff Gosney; Mike Jarboe; Doug Vines; Greg Street
May 27; 1:00 p.m. ET; Semifinal 2	LP: C. Bovair (4–4)	Boxscore	WP: C. Grice (8–1)	Durham Bulls Athletic Park; Attendance: 3,147; Umpires: Jeff Gosney; Mike Jarboe; Doug Vines; Greg Street
May 27; 1:00 p.m. ET; Semifinal 2	HR: T. Frick 2 (12), A. Osuna (10)	Boxscore	HR: B. Amick (12), B. Wright (8)	Durham Bulls Athletic Park; Attendance: 3,147; Umpires: Jeff Gosney; Mike Jarboe; Doug Vines; Greg Street

=== Championship Game ===
ACC Championship
(4) Miami (FL)	vs.	(3) Clemson

May 28, 2023 12:00 p.m. (EDT) at Durham Bulls Athletic Park in Durham, North Carolina
Team	1	2	3	4	5	6	7	8	9	R	H	E
(4) Miami (FL)	0	0	2	1	2	0	0	0	0	5	8	2
(3) Clemson	2	1	0	0	0	0	8	0	x	11	13	1
WP: C. Lindley (3–3) LP: A. Torres (4–1) Sv: None; Home runs: MIA: Z. Levenson (13); CLEM: C. Cannarella (6), W. Taylor (5), R. Bertram (1); Attendance: 4,792; Umpires: Linus Baker, Jeff Gosney, Adam Dowdy, Perry Costello; Boxscore

== All Tournament Team ==
Position	Player	Team
C	Tomas Frick	North Carolina
1B	Nick Kurtz	Wake Forest
2B	Riley Bertram	Clemson
3B	Yohandy Morales	Miami (FL)
SS	Zack Prajzner	Notre Dame
OF	Cooper Ingle	Clemson
OF	Cam Cannarella	Clemson
OF	Zach Levenson	Miami (FL)
DH	Caden Grice (MVP)	Clemson
P	Andrew Walters	Miami (FL)
P	Rhett Lowder	Wake Forest
