= 2023 Clemson Tigers baseball team =

American college baseball season

2023 Clemson Tigers baseball

ACC Tournament champions

Clemson Regional, 1–2
- Conference: Atlantic Coast Conference

Ranking
- Coaches: No. 18
- CB: No. 17
- Record: 44–19 (20–10 ACC)
- Head coach: Erik Bakich (1st season)
- Assistant coaches: Nick Schnabel (1st season); Jimmy Belanger (1st season)
- Home stadium: Doug Kingsmore Stadium

2023 Atlantic Coast Conference baseball standings
| | Conf. | | | | Overall |
| Team | W | | L | PCT | W | | L | PCT |
|---|---|---|---|---|---|---|---|---|
Atlantic
| No. 3 Wake Forest ^{x}‍‍‍^{y} | 22 | – | 7 | .759 | 54 | – | 12 | .818 |
| No. 18 Clemson ‍‍‡‍^{y} | 20 | – | 10 | .667 | 44 | – | 19 | .698 |
| Boston College ‍‍‍^{y} | 16 | – | 14 | .533 | 37 | – | 20 | .649 |
| Notre Dame ‍‍‍ | 15 | – | 15 | .500 | 30 | – | 24 | .556 |
| NC State ‍‍‍^{y} | 13 | – | 16 | .448 | 36 | – | 21 | .632 |
| Louisville ‍‍‍ | 10 | – | 20 | .333 | 31 | – | 24 | .564 |
| Florida State ‍‍‍ | 9 | – | 21 | .300 | 23 | – | 31 | .426 |
Coastal
| No. 6 Virginia ^{x}‍‍‍^{y} | 19 | – | 11 | .633 | 50 | – | 13 | .794 |
| No. 20 Miami (FL) ‍‍‍^{y} | 18 | – | 12 | .600 | 42 | – | 21 | .667 |
| No. 15 Duke ‍‍‍^{y} | 16 | – | 13 | .552 | 39 | – | 23 | .629 |
| North Carolina ‍‍‍^{y} | 14 | – | 14 | .500 | 36 | – | 24 | .600 |
| Virginia Tech ‍‍‍ | 12 | – | 17 | .414 | 30 | – | 23 | .566 |
| Georgia Tech ‍‍‍ | 12 | – | 18 | .400 | 30 | – | 27 | .526 |
| Pittsburgh ‍‍‍ | 10 | – | 18 | .357 | 24 | – | 31 | .436 |
x – Division champion ‡ – Tournament champion y – Invited to the NCAA tournament As of June 25, 2023; Rankings from D1Baseball

The 2023 Clemson Tigers baseball team were the varsity intercollegiate baseball team that represented Clemson University during the 2023 NCAA Division I baseball season. The Tigers competed in the Atlantic Coast Conference (ACC) and were led by first-year head coach Erik Bakich. Clemson played its home games at Doug Kingsmore Stadium in Clemson, South Carolina.

The Tigers started the season sluggishly going 4–4 in February and losing their first three ACC Series. They were 17–14 overall and 2–8 in the ACC as of April 6, after the first game of their series against Florida State. The Tigers won their next two games in the series and their season turned around. The Tigers only lost three more games during the regular season, and finished 39–17 overall and 20–10 in ACC play to finish in second place in the Atlantic Division. They went into the ACC tournament on a twelve-game winning streak and were the third seed. The Tigers were placed in a pool with sixth seed Boston College and tenth seed Virginia Tech. After going 2–0 in pool play, the Tigers defeated North Carolina in the Semifinals and Miami (FL) in the Final to win their eleventh ACC tournament title. The Tigers earned the ACC's automatic bid to the NCAA tournament and were selected as the fourth overall seed. They won the opening game of the regional against Lipscomb to extend their winning streak to seventeen games. Their streak ended there as they lost to Tennessee in fourteen innings. The Tigers could not overcome Charlotte in the elimination game of the regional and their season ended.

== Previous season ==
The Tigers finished the 2022 season 35–23 overall and 13–16 in ACC Play, to finish in sixth place in the Atlantic Division. As the twelfth seed in the ACC tournament they were placed in pool A with first seed Virginia Tech and eight seed North Carolina. They lost both games and were eliminated from the tournament. They were not invited to the NCAA tournament for the second consecutive year. It was the first time the Tigers had missed the NCAA tournament in consecutive years since 1982–1986. It was their first time missing back-to-back tournaments since the field expanded to 64 teams in 1999. At the end of the season, Monte Lee was fired as the head coach.

== Personnel ==
=== Roster ===
2023 Clemson Tigers roster
| Pitchers: 13 - B.J. Bailey - Junior; 15 - Reed Garris - Sophomore; 18 - Tristan Smith - Freshman; 20 - Willie Weiss - (redshirt) Senior; 21 - Ryan Ammons - (redshirt) Junior; 25 - Jackson Lindley - (redshirt) Senior; 26 - Casey Tallent - Sophomore; 29 - Joe Allen - Freshman; 30 - Billy Barlow - Sophomore; 31 - Caden Grice - Junior; 35 - Jay Dill - Sophomore; 36 - Ty Olenchuk - Junior; 37 - Nick Hoffmann - (redshirt) Junior; 39 - Ethan Darden - Freshman; 41 - Nathan Dvorsky - Freshman; 44 - Nick Clayton - (redshirt) Junior; 48 - Rob Hughes - (redshirt) Senior; 51 - Rocco Reid - Sophomore; 53 - Josh Davis - (redshirt) Freshman; 56 - Austin Gordon - Sophomore | Catchers: 9 - Jacob Jarrell - Freshman; 12 - Cooper Ingle - Junior; 33 - Hogan Garner - Freshman; Infielders: 2 - Nolan Nawrocki - Freshman; 6 - Riley Bertram - (redshirt) Senior; 8 - Blake Wright - Junior; 10 - Cam Cannarella - Freshman; 17 - Billy Amick - Sophomore; 19 - Cooper Blauser - Freshman; 24 - Mac Starbuc - (redshirt) Senior; 32 - Jack Reynolds - Freshman; 50 - Jay Dillard - Freshman | Outfielders: 1 - Tyler Corbitt - (redshirt) Senior; 3 - Jack Crighton - Freshman; 4 - Benjamin Blackwell - (redshirt) Senior; 5 - Gavin Abrams - Sophomore; 11 - Chad Fairey - (redshirt) Senior; 16 - Will Taylor - Sophomore; 22 - Nathan Hall - Freshman; 27 - Tristan Bissetta - (redshirt) Freshman; 55 - Lleyton Lackey - Freshman; Utility: 40 - Brodey Conn - Freshman; 54 - Nick Couch - (redshirt) Junior |

=== Coaching staff ===
2023 Clemson Tigers coaching staff
| Name | Position | Seasons at Clemson |
|---|---|---|
| Erik Bakich | Head coach | 1 |
| Nick Schnabel | Assistant Coach | 1 |
| Jimmy Belanger | Assistant Coach | 1 |
| Griffin Mazur | Volunteer Assistant Coach | 1 |

== Schedule ==
Legend
| | Clemson win |
| | Clemson loss |
| | Cancellation |
| **Bold** | Clemson team member |
| * | Non-Conference game |
| † | Make-Up Game |

2023 Clemson Tigers baseball game log
Regular season

February (4–4)
| Date | Opponent | Rank | Site/stadium | Score | Win | Loss | Save | Attendance | Overall record | ACC record |
|---|---|---|---|---|---|---|---|---|---|---|
| Feb 17 | Binghamton* | | Doug Kingsmore Stadium; Clemson, SC | **W** 11–3 | **Ammons** (1–0) | Babalis (0–1) | None | 4,469 | 1–0 | – |
| Feb 18 | Binghamton* | | Doug Kingsmore Stadium | **W** 3–2 | **Weiss** (1–0) | Collins (0–1) | **Smith** (1) | 5,050 | 2–0 | – |
| Feb 19 | Binghamton* | | Doug Kingsmore Stadium | **W** 19–1 | **Dill** (1–0) | Bryggman (0–1) | None | 4,150 | 3–0 | – |
| Feb 21 | Charlotte* | | Doug Kingsmore Stadium | **W** 9–5 | **Bailey** (1–0) | Gillentine (0–1) | None | 4,200 | 4–0 | – |
| Feb 24 | UCF* | | Doug Kingsmore Stadium | **L** 2–4 | Centala (1–0) | **Lindley** (0–1) | Kramer (1) | 4,281 | 4–1 | – |
| Feb 25 | UCF* | | Doug Kingsmore Stadium | **L** 7–10 | Marlowe (1–1) | **Darden** (0–1) | None | 4,357 | 4–2 | – |
| Feb 26 | UCF* | | Doug Kingsmore Stadium | **L** 6–13 | Vespi (1–0) | **Bailey** (1–1) | Vieira (1) | 4,286 | 4–3 | – |
| Feb 28 | vs. USC Upstate* | | Fluor Field at the West End; Greenville, SC | **L** 3–6 | Curtis (2–0) | **Hoffmann** (0–1) | Sullivan (1) | 1,397 | 4–4 | – |

March (12–8)
| Date | Opponent | Rank | Site/stadium | Score | Win | Loss | Save | Attendance | Overall record | ACC record |
|---|---|---|---|---|---|---|---|---|---|---|
| Mar 3 | No. 23 South Carolina* | | Doug Kingsmore Stadium | **W** 5–2 | **Lindley** (1–1) | Sanders (1–1) | None | 5,456 | 5–4 | – |
| Mar 4 | vs. No. 23 South Carolina* | | Fluor Field at the West End | **L** 9–11 | Becker (1–0) | **Dill** (1–1) | None | 7,215 | 5–5 | – |
| Mar 5 | at No. 23 South Carolina* | | Founders Park; Columbia, SC | **L** 1–7 | Hicks (3–0) | **Barlow** (0–1) | None | 8,242 | 5–6 | – |
| Mar 7 | East Tennessee State* | | Doug Kingsmore Stadium | **W** 4–1 | **Allen** (1–0) | Smiddy (3–2) | **Lindley** (1) | 4,263 | 6–6 | – |
| Mar 8 | Presbyterian* | | Doug Kingsmore Stadium | **W** 5–3 | **Dvorsky** (1–0) | Ymker (0–1) | **Tallent** (1) | 4,107 | 7–6 | – |
| Mar 10 | Georgia State* | | Doug Kingsmore Stadium | **W** 9–8 | **Hoffmann** (1–1) | Ottinger (0–2) | None | 3,912 | 8–6 | – |
| Mar 11 | Georgia State* | | Doug Kingsmore Stadium | **W** 10–2 | **Garris** (1–0) | Landry (0–1) | **Allen** (1) | 5,242 | 9–6 | – |
| Mar 11 | Georgia State* | | Doug Kingsmore Stadium | **W** 10–7 | **Clayton** (1–0) | Watson (0–1) | None | 5,242 | 10–6 | – |
| Mar 14 | College of Charleston* | | Doug Kingsmore Stadium | **W** 4–3 | **Hoffmann** (2–1) | Privette (1–1) | **Lindley** (2) | 4,089 | 11–6 | – |
| Mar 18 | Duke | | Doug Kingsmore Stadium | **L** 2–3 | Beilenson (1–1) | **Gordon** (0–1) | Tallon (3) | 5,213 | 11–7 | 0–1 |
| Mar 18 | Duke | | Doug Kingsmore Stadium | **W** 14–9 | **Tallent** (1–0) | White (2–1) | **Hoffmann** (1) | 5,213 | 12–7 | 1–1 |
| Mar 19 | Duke | | Doug Kingsmore Stadium | **L** 8–11 | Weaver (2–1) | **Reid** (0–1) | None | 3,974 | 12–8 | 1–2 |
| Mar 21 | Winthrop* | | Doug Kingsmore Stadium | **W** 8–5 | **Clayton** (2–0) | Whittle (2–1) | None | 3,803 | 13–8 | – |
| Mar 22 | at Kennesaw State* | | Fred Stillwell Stadium; Kennesaw, GA | **W** 6–2 | **Garris** (2–0) | Eidson (1–2) | None | 857 | 14–8 | – |
| Mar 24 | at Georgia Tech | | Russ Chandler Stadium; Atlanta, GA | **L** 3–4 (11) | Busse (1–1) | **Lindley** (1–2) | None | 1,279 | 14–9 | 1–3 |
| Mar 25 | at Georgia Tech | | Russ Chandler Stadium | **L** 3–16 | Schmolke (3–0) | **Smith** (0–1) | None | 1,779 | 14–10 | 1–4 |
| Mar 26 | at Georgia Tech | | Russ Chandler Stadium | **W** 14–5 | **Grice** (1–0) | Finley (1–2) | None | 1,205 | 15–10 | 2–4 |
| Mar 28 | vs. College of Charleston* | | Segra Park; Columbia, SC | **W** 10–3 | **Darden** (1–1) | Campbell (1–1) | None | 1,678 | 16–10 | – |
| Mar 30 | No. 2 Wake Forest | | Doug Kingsmore Stadium | **L** 3–8 | Lowder (6–0) | **Gordon** (0–2) | None | 4,217 | 16–11 | 2–5 |
| Mar 31 | No. 2 Wake Forest | | Doug Kingsmore Stadium | **L** 3–4 | Keener (3–0) | **Lindley** (1–3) | Minacci (7) | 4,345 | 16–12 | 2–6 |

April (12–5)
| Date | Opponent | Rank | Site/stadium | Score | Win | Loss | Save | Attendance | Overall record | ACC record |
|---|---|---|---|---|---|---|---|---|---|---|
| Apr 1 | No. 2 Wake Forest | | Doug Kingsmore Stadium | **L** 5–6 | Hartle (6–1) | **Grice** (1–1) | Roland (1) | 4,521 | 16–13 | 2–7 |
| Apr 4 | No. 17 Coastal Carolina* | | Doug Kingsmore Stadium | **W** 16–6 (7) | **Hoffmann** (3–1) | Huesman (1–3) | None | 4,678 | 17–13 | – |
| Apr 6 | at Florida State | | Dick Howser Stadium; Tallahassee, FL | **L** 1–5 | Baumeister (2–2) | **Gordon** (0–3) | Montgomery (1) | 4,542 | 17–14 | 2–8 |
| Apr 7 | at Florida State | | Dick Howser Stadium | **W** 8–1 | **Darden** (2–1) | Whittaker (3–3) | None | 4,406 | 18–14 | 3–8 |
| Apr 8 | at Florida State | | Dick Howser Stadium | **W** 6–2 | **Grice** (2–1) | Armstrong (1–2) | None | 4,279 | 19–14 | 4–8 |
| Apr 11 | at Georgia* | | Foley Field; Athens, GA | **W** 8–1 | **Weiss** (2–0) | L. Wagner (1–2) | None | 3,569 | 20–14 | – |
| Apr 14 | Notre Dame | | Doug Kingsmore Stadium | **L** 4–10 | Spivey (1–0) | **Darden** (2–2) | Tyrell (1) | 4,347 | 20–15 | 4–9 |
| Apr 15 | Notre Dame | | Doug Kingsmore Stadium | **W** 5–1 | **Gordon** (1–3) | Findlay (4–2) | None | 5,174 | 21–15 | 5–9 |
| Apr 16 | Notre Dame | | Doug Kingsmore Stadium | **W** 6–4 | **Clayton** (3–0) | Birkholz (0–3) | None | 4,202 | 22–15 | 6–9 |
| Apr 18 | Georgia* | | Doug Kingsmore Stadium | **L** 4–5 | Caldwell (2–0) | **Bailey** (1–2) | Finley (3) | 4,645 | 22–16 | – |
| Apr 21 | at NC State | | Doak Field; Raleigh, NC | **W** 10–2 | **Darden** (3–2) | Whitaker (3–3) | None | 3,048 | 23–16 | 7–9 |
| Apr 22 | at NC State | | Doak Field | **W** 9–7 | **Garris** (3–0) | Britton (2–2) | **Ammons** (1) | 2,844 | 24–16 | 8–9 |
| Apr 23 | at NC State | | Doak Field | **W** 8–5 | **Grice** (3–1) | Willadsen (4–3) | **Smith** (2) | 2,956 | 25–16 | 9–9 |
| Apr 25 | Kennesaw State* | | Doug Kingsmore Stadium | **W** 15–5 (7) | **Olenchuk** (1–0) | Sliver (1–2) | None | 4,112 | 26–16 | 9–9 |
| Apr 28 | at No. 11 Boston College | | Brighton Field; Brighton, MA | **W** 9–7 | **Clayton** (4–0) | Schroeder (5–3) | **Ammons** (2) | N/A | 27–16 | 10–9 |
| Apr 28 | at No. 11 Boston College | | Brighton Field | **L** 1–3 | West (2–3) | **Gordon** (1–4) | Ryan (3) | 1,063 | 27–17 | 10–10 |
| Apr 29 | at No. 11 Boston College | | Brighton Field | **W** 6–3 | **Grice** (4–1) | Flynn (6–2) | None | 832 | 28–17 | 11–10 |

May (11–0)
| Date | Opponent | Rank | Site/stadium | Score | Win | Loss | Save | Attendance | Overall record | ACC record |
|---|---|---|---|---|---|---|---|---|---|---|
| May 5 | Louisville | | Doug Kingsmore Stadium | **W** 6–3 | **Garris** (4–0) | Campbell (1–1) | **Ammons** (3) | 4,187 | 29–17 | 12–10 |
| May 6 | Louisville | | Doug Kingsmore Stadium | **W** 4–3 | **Clayton** (5–0) | Phillips (4–2) | **Hughes** (1) | 4,456 | 30–17 | 13–10 |
| May 7 | Louisville | | Doug Kingsmore Stadium | **W** 7–3 | **Grice** (5–1) | Biven (0–2) | **Ammons** (4) | 4,189 | 31–17 | 14–10 |
| May 10 | at No. 8 Coastal Carolina* | No. 16 | Springs Brooks Stadium; Conway, SC | **W** 13–6 | **Allen** (2–0) | Shaffer (4–1) | None | 3,511 | 32–17 | 14–10 |
| May 12 | at Virginia Tech | No. 16 | English Field; Blacksburg, VA | **W** 15–4 | **Lindley** (2–3) | Hackenberg (5–6) | None | 1,461 | 33–17 | 15–10 |
| May 13 | at Virginia Tech | No. 16 | English Field | **W** 9–8 | **Clayton** (6–0) | Kirtner (1–1) | **Smith** (3) | 1,485 | 34–17 | 16–10 |
| May 14 | at Virginia Tech | No. 16 | English Field | **W** 9–6 | **Grice** (6–1) | Hurney (3–2) | **Smith** (4) | 1,805 | 35–17 | 17–10 |
| May 16 | USC Upstate* | No. 7 | Doug Kingsmore Stadium | **W** 12–2 (8) | **Allen** (3–0) | Matheny (2–3) | None | 4,123 | 36–17 | 17–10 |
| May 18 | North Carolina | No. 7 | Doug Kingsmore Stadium | **W** 14–7 | **Clayton** (7–0) | Carlson (4–2) | None | 4,102 | 37–17 | 18–10 |
| May 19 | North Carolina | No. 7 | Doug Kingsmore Stadium | **W** 5–4 | **Ammons** (2–0) | Poston (3–3) | None | 4,644 | 38–17 | 19–10 |
| May 20 | North Carolina | No. 7 | Doug Kingsmore Stadium | **W** 3–1 | **Grice** (7–1) | Pence (4–2) | **Hughes** (2) | 4,589 | 39–17 | 20–10 |

Postseason

ACC Tournament (4–0)
| Date | Opponent | Seed/Rank | Site/stadium | Score | Win | Loss | Save | Attendance | Overall record | Tournament record |
|---|---|---|---|---|---|---|---|---|---|---|
| May 24 | (10) Virginia Tech | (3) No. 6 | Durham Bulls Athletic Park; Durham, NC | **W** 14–5 | **Bailey** (2–2) | Hackenberg (5–8) | None | 2,398 | 40–17 | 1–0 |
| May 26 | (6) Boston College | (3) No. 6 | Durham Bulls Athletic Park | **W** 4–1 | **Gordon** (2–4) | Flynn (7–3) | **Ammons** (5) | 3,348 | 41–17 | 2–0 |
| May 27 | (7) North Carolina | (3) No. 6 | Durham Bulls Athletic Park | **W** 10–4 | **Grice** (8–1) | Bovair (4–4) | None | 3,147 | 42–17 | 3–0 |
| May 28 | (4) No. 11 Miami (FL) | (3) No. 6 | Durham Bulls Athletic Park | **W** 11–5 | **Lindley** (3–3) | Torres (4–1) | None | 4,792 | 43–17 | 4–0 |

NCAA tournament (1–2)
| Date | Opponent | Seed/Rank | Site/stadium | Score | Win | Loss | Save | Attendance | Overall record | Tournament record |
|---|---|---|---|---|---|---|---|---|---|---|
| June 2 | (4) Lipscomb | (1) No. 3 | Doug Kingsmore Stadium | **W** 12–5 | **Clayton** (8–0) | Van Treeck (8–5) | None | 5,322 | 44–17 | 1–0 |
| June 3 | (2) No. 21 Tennessee | (1) No. 3 | Doug Kingsmore Stadium | **L** 5–6 (14) | Halvorsen (3–3) | **Tallent** (1–1) | None | 6,275 | 44–18 | 1–1 |
| June 4 | (3) Charlotte | (1) No. 3 | Doug Kingsmore Stadium | **L** 2–3 | Thompson (8–2) | **Hughes** (0–1) | None | 4,834 | 44–19 | 1–2 |

Note: All rankings shown are from D1Baseball Poll.

== Rankings ==
Ranking movements Legend: ██ Increase in ranking ██ Decrease in ranking — = Not ranked RV = Received votes
| | Week | | | | | | | | | | | | | | | | | | |
| Poll | Pre | 1 | 2 | 3 | 4 | 5 | 6 | 7 | 8 | 9 | 10 | 11 | 12 | 13 | 14 | 15 | 16 | 17 | Final |
|---|---|---|---|---|---|---|---|---|---|---|---|---|---|---|---|---|---|---|---|
| Coaches' | — | —* | — | — | — | — | — | — | — | — | — | RV | 21 | 10 | 8 | 5 | 5* | 5* | 18 |
| Baseball America | — | — | — | — | — | — | — | — | — | — | — | — | 18 | 16 | 7 | 4 | 4* | 4* | 15 |
| Collegiate Baseball^ | 42 | — | — | — | — | — | — | — | — | — | — | 25 | 17 | 11 | 7 | 3 | 17 | 17 | 17 |
| NCBWA† | — | — | — | — | — | — | — | — | — | — | RV | RV | 21 | 13 | 9 | 6 | 19 | 19* | 18 |
| D1Baseball | — | — | — | — | — | — | — | — | — | — | — | — | 16 | 7 | 6 | 3 | 3* | 3* | 18 |

^ Collegiate Baseball ranked 40 teams in their preseason poll, but only ranked 30 teams weekly during the season.
† NCBWA ranks 30 teams in their preseason poll, but only ranks 25 teams weekly during the season.
* A new poll was not released for this week, so for comparison purposes, the previous week's ranking is inserted in this week's slot.
