= Erik Bakich =

American college baseball coach (born 1977)

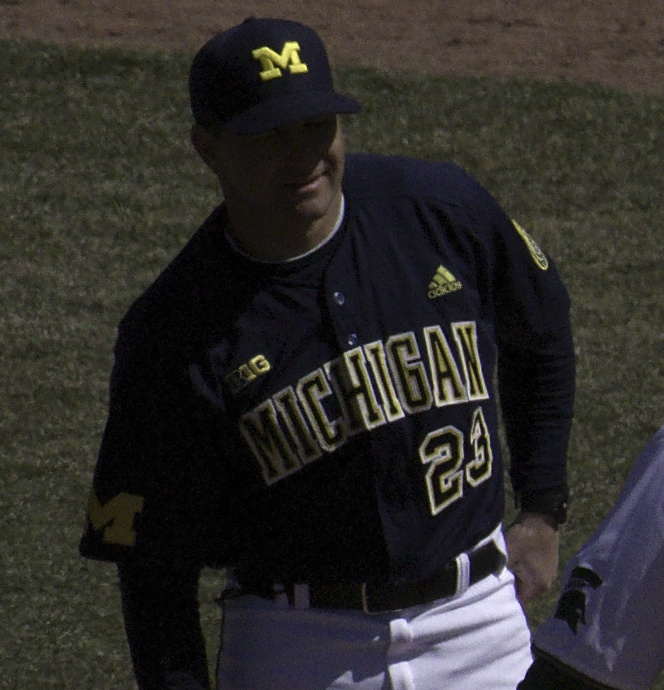
- Bakich in 2013

Current position
- Title: Head coach
- Team: Clemson
- Conference: ACC
- Record: 164–79 (.675)

Biographical details
- Born: November 27, 1977 (age 48); San Jose, California, U.S.
- Education: East Carolina University

Playing career
- 1997–1998: San Jose CC
- 1999–2000: East Carolina
- Position: Left fielder

Coaching career (HC unless noted)
- 2002: Clemson (assistant)
- 2003–2009: Vanderbilt (assistant)
- 2010–2012: Maryland
- 2013–2022: Michigan
- 2023–present: Clemson

Head coaching record
- Overall: 562–393 (.588)
- Tournaments: ACC: 7–3; Big Ten: 14–9; NCAA: 14–15

Accomplishments and honors

Championships
- ACC Atlantic Division (2024); ACC Tournament (2023); 2 Big Ten Tournament (2015, 2022)

Awards
- All-Colonial Athletic Association (2000); NCBWA National Coach of the Year (2019); D1Baseball Coach of the Year (2019); Skip Bertman Coach of the Year (2019)

Erik Michael Bakich (born November 27, 1977) is an American baseball coach and former left fielder, who is the current head baseball coach of the Clemson Tigers. Bakich played college baseball at San Jose City College (1997–1998) and East Carolina University for head coach Keith LeClair from 1999 to 2000. He served as the head coach of Maryland Terrapins (2010–2012) and the Michigan Wolverines (2013–2022).

== Early life ==
Bakich attended Bellarmine College Preparatory, graduating in 1996. Bakich played baseball at East Carolina University in 1999 and 2000. He played as a left fielder with a 1.000 fielding percentage with 91 putouts, .315 batting average, 14 home runs, 85 RBIs, and 87 runs. Both years, the Pirates secured the Colonial Athletic Association championship and earned No. 1 seeds in the NCAA regionals. Bakich was awarded all-conference honors in 2000. Bakich graduated from East Carolina with a sports science degree in 2000.

Bakich played independent league baseball, first with the Springfield Capitals of the Frontier League in 2000, then in 2001 with the Greenville Bluesmen of the Texas–Louisiana League, Dubois County Dragons of the Frontier League, and the Tennessee T's of the All-American Association.

== Coaching career ==
After his brief professional playing stint, Bakich embarked upon his coaching career as a volunteer assistant at Clemson University in 2002. He worked as a hitting coach, and with both infielders and outfielders. Clemson advanced to the College World Series that season.

Bakich then moved to Vanderbilt University in 2003 to become the school's recruiting coordinator, hitting coach, and outfield instructor. Collegiate Baseball ranked Bakich's first recruiting class the 24th best in the nation. In 2004, Vanderbilt increased its batting average from .258 the previous season to .304, the largest jump in school history. Vanderbilt brought in the No. 1 ranked recruiting class in 2005. Baseball America ranked the 2006 recruiting class 25th, and the 2007 class 12th. In 2008, the Commodores secured the No. 2 class. Each year of Bakich's seven-year tenure saw a top-25 ranked recruiting class.

=== Maryland ===
In June 2009, the University of Maryland hired Bakich to replace former nine-year head coach Terry Rupp. Bakich sought to rebuild the program and eventually achieve regular appearances in the NCAA tournament, an event Maryland had not qualified for since 1971. His long-term strategy focused on recruiting, player development, and improving facilities. By September, Bakich had secured eleven commitments in the 2010 recruiting class and one in the 2011 class. He stated his plan to build a "recruiting wall" around the state to keep local talent at home. Bakich said, "Patience is not a virtue of mine. We don't have any time for that shit."

Maryland finished its first season under Bakich with a 17–39 mark and 5–25 in the Atlantic Coast Conference (ACC). The Terrapins matched the worst finish in program history. Bakich said, "I know it sounds odd, but wins and losses have never been important to me. I wanted to change the attitude of this team first and foremost, and you can already see that happening. Our seniors have done a great job of leading this team, and the transformation has already been made." The 2011 recruiting class was described as one of the best in school history. Bakich resigned as Maryland's head baseball coach on June 27, 2012, in order to pursue his new head coaching career for the Michigan Wolverines baseball team.

=== Michigan ===
On June 27, 2012, Bakich was named the 19th coach in the history of Michigan Wolverines baseball. On the same day of Bakich's hire, Bakich made his first public press conference as head coach of Michigan. Bakich was most noted for his quote, "We want to catch that softball program" meaning Michigan's softball program, and showed great praise for head Michigan Softball coach Carol Hutchins. Erik Bakich made many assurances that Michigan baseball will be back to winning championships at a consistent rate, not just every once in a while. Bakich also talked a lot about pitching and defense for Michigan, and bringing in the best recruits locally, regionally, and nationally.

On May 24, 2015, Michigan defeated Maryland 4–3 in the Big Ten Conference Tournament championship game, securing a bid to the NCAA tournament for the first time since 2008. During the 2019 season, Bakich led the Wolverines to a 50–22 record, including a 16–7 Big Ten Conference record, as they advanced to the College World Series for the first time since 1984. On June 15, 2019, Bakich was named the NCBWA National Coach of the Year. Later that year, Bakich received the 2019 Skip Bertman Award.

=== Clemson ===
On June 16, 2022, Bakich signed a six-year, $6.25 million deal to be the head baseball coach of the Clemson Tigers.

== Head coaching record ==
Below is a table of Bakich's yearly records as an NCAA head baseball coach.

Record table
Season	Coach	Overall	Conference	Standing	Postseason
Maryland Terrapins (Atlantic Coast Conference) (2010–2012)
2010	Maryland	17–39	5–25	6th (Atlantic)	
2011	Maryland	21–35	5–25	6th (Atlantic)	
2012	Maryland	32–24	10–20	T–5th (Atlantic)	
Maryland:		70–98	20–70		
Michigan Wolverines (Big Ten Conference) (2013–2022)
2013	Michigan	29–27	14–10	T–5th	
2014	Michigan	30–29	13–11	T–4th	
2015	Michigan	39–25	14–10	T–3rd	NCAA regional
2016	Michigan	36–21	13–10	5th	
2017	Michigan	42–17	16–8	2nd	NCAA regional
2018	Michigan	33–21	15–8	3rd	
2019	Michigan	50–22	16–7	2nd	College World Series Runner-Up
2020	Michigan	8–7	0–0		Season canceled due to COVID-19
2021	Michigan	27–19	27–17	3rd	NCAA regional
2022	Michigan	34–28	12–12	5th	NCAA regional
Michigan:		328–216	140–93		
Clemson Tigers (Atlantic Coast Conference) (2023–present)
2023	Clemson	44–19	20–10	2nd (Atlantic)	NCAA Regional
2024	Clemson	44–16	20–10	1st (Atlantic)	NCAA Super Regional
2025	Clemson	45–18	18–12	5th	NCAA Regional
2026	Clemson	31–26	10–20	15th	
Clemson:		164–79 (.675)	68–52 (.567)		
Total:		562–393 (.588)			
National champion Postseason invitational champion Conference regular season champion Conference regular season and conference tournament champion Division regular season champion Division regular season and conference tournament champion Conference tournament champion

== See also ==
- List of current NCAA Division I baseball coaches
