= 2023 Louisville Cardinals baseball team =

American college baseball season

2023 Louisville Cardinals baseball
- Conference: Atlantic Coast Conference
- Record: 31–24 (10–20 ACC)
- Head coach: Dan McDonnell (17th season)
- Assistant coaches: Roger Williams (17th season); Eric Snider (9th season); Adam Vrable (9th season)
- Home stadium: Jim Patterson Stadium

2023 Atlantic Coast Conference baseball standings
	Conf.				Overall
Team	W		L	PCT	W		L	PCT
Atlantic
No. 3 Wake Forest ^{x}‍‍‍^{y}	22	–	7	.759	54	–	12	.818
No. 18 Clemson ‍‍‡‍^{y}	20	–	10	.667	44	–	19	.698
Boston College ‍‍‍^{y}	16	–	14	.533	37	–	20	.649
Notre Dame ‍‍‍	15	–	15	.500	30	–	24	.556
NC State ‍‍‍^{y}	13	–	16	.448	36	–	21	.632
Louisville ‍‍‍	10	–	20	.333	31	–	24	.564
Florida State ‍‍‍	9	–	21	.300	23	–	31	.426
Coastal
No. 6 Virginia ^{x}‍‍‍^{y}	19	–	11	.633	50	–	13	.794
No. 20 Miami (FL) ‍‍‍^{y}	18	–	12	.600	42	–	21	.667
No. 15 Duke ‍‍‍^{y}	16	–	13	.552	39	–	23	.629
North Carolina ‍‍‍^{y}	14	–	14	.500	36	–	24	.600
Virginia Tech ‍‍‍	12	–	17	.414	30	–	23	.566
Georgia Tech ‍‍‍	12	–	18	.400	30	–	27	.526
Pittsburgh ‍‍‍	10	–	18	.357	24	–	31	.436
x – Division champion ‡ – Tournament champion y – Invited to the NCAA tournament As of June 25, 2023; Rankings from D1Baseball

The 2023 Louisville Cardinals baseball team represented the University of Louisville during the 2023 NCAA Division I baseball season. The Cardinals played their home games at Jim Patterson Stadium as a member of the Atlantic Coast Conference. They were led by head coach Dan McDonnell, in his 17th season at Louisville.

With a record of 31–24, the Cardinals missed the NCAA Tournament for the second time in three seasons. The Cards also missed the conference tournament with a record of 10–20. This was the first time since 1970 and the first time under Coach McDonnell that Louisville missed its conference tournament. Louisville entered the season ranked as high as 11th in the preseason polls and would reach 2nd during the season before stumbling down the stretch.

== Previous season ==
The 2022 Louisville Cardinals baseball team notched a 42–21–1 (18–11–1) regular season record. The Cardinals received the 12th seed in the NCAA tournament and were selected to host an NCAA Regional. They advanced to the NCAA Super Regional where they fell to Texas A&M.

=== 2022 MLB draft ===
The Cardinals had five players drafted in the 2022 MLB draft.

Player	Position	Round	Overall	MLB Team
Dalton Rushing	Catcher	2	40	Los Angeles Dodgers
Jared Poland	Pitcher	6	172	Miami Marlins
Michael Prosecky	Pitcher	6	176	Colorado Rockies
Ben Metzinger	Third baseman	7	222	Milwaukee Brewers
Levi Usher	Center fielder	10	295	Kansas City Royals

== Personnel ==
=== Roster ===
2023 Louisville Cardinals roster
Pitchers: 7 – Kade Grundy – Sophomore; 10 – Carson Liggett – Sophomore; 15 – Alex Galvan – Junior; 17 – Cameron Robinson – Graduate; 18 – Will Koger – Sophomore; 19 – Ryan Hawks – Sophomore; 24 – Wyatt Danilowicz – Freshman; 26 – Greg Farone – Junior; 27 – Evan Webster – Senior; 34 – Ben Wiegman – Junior; 40 – Tate Kuehner – Senior; 41 – Riley Phillips – Junior; 43 – Ethan Patera – Freshman; 44 – Dan Snyder – Freshman; 46 – Justin West – Freshman; 49 – Kayden Campbell – Freshman; 52 – Nolan Smoot – Junior; 54 – Kaleb Corbett – Junior; 56 – Trevor Amburgey – Junior	Catchers: 4 – Will Vierling – Freshman; 11 – Brantley Bamberg – Freshman; 25 – Matt Klein – Freshman; 33 – Jack Payton – Junior; Infielders: 2 – Logan Beard – Junior; 5 – Gavin Kilen – Freshman; 8 – Brandon Anderson – Sophomore; 9 – Christian Knapczyk – Junior; 14 – Noah Smith – Sophomore; 30 – Ryan McCoy – Junior; 31 – Blane Schmitt – Freshman; 32 – Jameson Richmond – Freshman; 45 – Will Cook – Sophomore	Outfielders: 5 – Haven Mangrum – Junior; 13 – JT Benson – Junior; 16 – Michael Lippe – Freshman; 20 – Korbyn Dickerson – Freshman; 29 – Tyeler Hawkins – Senior; 42 – Eddie King Jr. – Sophomor; 51 – Isaac Humphrey – Junior; Utility: 1 – Patrick Forbes (INF/P) – Freshman; 22 – Tucker Biven (INF/P) – Freshman

=== Coaching staff ===
2023 Louisville Cardinals Coaching Staff
Name	Position	Seasons at Louisville	Alma mater
Dan McDonnell	Head coach	17	The Citadel (1992)
Roger Williams	Associate head coach/Pitching	17	East Carolina (1997)
Eric Snider	Assistant Coach/recruiting coordinator	9	Northern Iowa (1987)
Adam Vrable	Assistant Coach	9	Coastal Carolina (2007)
Brian Mundorf	Director of Operations	28	American International (1992)

== Rankings ==
Ranking movements Legend: ██ Increase in ranking ██ Decrease in ranking — = Not ranked
	Week																		
Poll	Pre	1	2	3	4	5	6	7	8	9	10	11	12	13	14	15	16	17	Final
Coaches'	11	11*	7	7	6	11	12	9	10	19	25	—	—	—	—	—*	—*	—*	—
Baseball America	5	4	4	4	3	3	8	17	10	13	—	—	—	—	—	—	—*	—*	—
Collegiate Baseball^	6	5	4	4	2	2	8	9	8	10	—	—	—	—	—	—	—	—	—
NCBWA†	10	10	10	8	7	6	10	14	10	9	19	22	—	—	—	—	—	—*	—
D1Baseball	16	16	14	9	8	6	11	18	10	12	21	—	—	—	—	—	—*	—*	—

^ Collegiate Baseball ranked 40 teams in their preseason poll, but only ranked 30 teams weekly during the season.
† NCBWA ranks 30 teams in their preseason poll, but only ranks 25 teams weekly during the season.
* A new poll was not released for this week, so for comparison purposes, the previous week's ranking is inserted in this week's slot.

== 2023 MLB draft ==
The Cardinals had four players drafted in the 2023 MLB draft for its lowest total since the 2015 MLB draft.

Player	Position	Round	Overall	MLB Team
Christian Knapczyk	Shortstop	5	161	Cleveland Guardians
Tate Kuehner	Pitcher	7	212	Milwaukee Brewers
Ryan Hawks	Pitcher	8	247	Seattle Mariners
Jack Payton	Catcher	11	330	San Francisco Giants
