= 2023 Pittsburgh Panthers baseball team =

American college baseball season

2023 Pittsburgh Panthers baseball
- Conference: Atlantic Coast Conference
- Coastal
- Record: 24–31 (10–18 ACC)
- Head coach: Mike Bell (5th season)
- Assistant coaches: Joe Mercadante (2nd season); Devin Mesoraco (2nd season)
- Hitting coach: Ty Megahee (5th season)
- Home stadium: Charles L. Cost Field

2023 Atlantic Coast Conference baseball standings
	Conf.				Overall
Team	W		L	PCT	W		L	PCT
Atlantic
No. 3 Wake Forest ^{x}‍‍‍^{y}	22	–	7	.759	54	–	12	.818
No. 18 Clemson ‍‍‡‍^{y}	20	–	10	.667	44	–	19	.698
Boston College ‍‍‍^{y}	16	–	14	.533	37	–	20	.649
Notre Dame ‍‍‍	15	–	15	.500	30	–	24	.556
NC State ‍‍‍^{y}	13	–	16	.448	36	–	21	.632
Louisville ‍‍‍	10	–	20	.333	31	–	24	.564
Florida State ‍‍‍	9	–	21	.300	23	–	31	.426
Coastal
No. 6 Virginia ^{x}‍‍‍^{y}	19	–	11	.633	50	–	13	.794
No. 20 Miami (FL) ‍‍‍^{y}	18	–	12	.600	42	–	21	.667
No. 15 Duke ‍‍‍^{y}	16	–	13	.552	39	–	23	.629
North Carolina ‍‍‍^{y}	14	–	14	.500	36	–	24	.600
Virginia Tech ‍‍‍	12	–	17	.414	30	–	23	.566
Georgia Tech ‍‍‍	12	–	18	.400	30	–	27	.526
Pittsburgh ‍‍‍	10	–	18	.357	24	–	31	.436
x – Division champion ‡ – Tournament champion y – Invited to the NCAA tournament As of June 25, 2023; Rankings from D1Baseball

The 2023 Pittsburgh Panthers baseball team was a baseball team that represented the University of Pittsburgh in the 2023 NCAA Division I baseball season. The Panthers were members of the Atlantic Coast Conference in the Coastal Division and played their home games at Charles L. Cost Field in Pittsburgh, Pennsylvania. They were led by fifth-year head coach Mike Bell.

The Panthers finished the season 24–31 overall and 10–18 in ACC play to finish in sixth place in the Coastal Division. They were the twelfth overall seed in the ACC Tournament and were placed into a pool with first seed Wake Forest and eighth seed Notre Dame. They defeated Notre Dame, but lost to Wake Forest and did not advance out of pool play. They did not receive an invitation to the NCAA Tournament.

== Previous season ==
The Panthers finished the 2022 NCAA Division I baseball season 29–27 overall (13–16 conference) and sixth place in the Coastal Division standings. Following the conclusion of the regular season, the Panthers were selected to play in the 2022 ACC Tournament. The Panthers would eventually lose in Pool Play 1–2 to NC State Wolfpack.

== Roster ==
2023 Pittsburgh Panthers baseball team
Players
Coaches

#	Pos.	Name	B/T	Height	Weight	Year	Previous school	Home town
1	INF	Tommy Tavarez	R/R	5 ft 11 in (1.8 m)	160 lb (73 kg)	So	Citius Prep	Brooklyn, New York
2	INF	Justin Acal	R/R	5 ft 9 in (1.75 m)	167 lb (76 kg)	Sr	Frederick C.C.	Frederick, Maryland
3	INF	Sky Duff	L/R	5 ft 9 in (1.75 m)	180 lb (82 kg)	Sr	Eustace Preparatory School	Shamong, New Jersey
4	INF	Matt Travisano	R/R	5 ft 9 in (1.75 m)	176 lb (80 kg)	Fr	Noble and Greenough School	Carlisle, Massachusetts
6	OF	Dom Popa	L/L	5 ft 11 in (1.8 m)	170 lb (77 kg)	Jr	Seton-La Salle Catholic H.S.	Pittsburgh, Pennsylvania
8	RHP	Brady Devereux	R/R	6 ft 2 in (1.88 m)	200 lb (91 kg)	RS Jr	Malvern Preparatory School	Glen Mills, Pennsylvania
9	INF	Nolan Kutney	R/R	6 ft 1 in (1.85 m)	194 lb (88 kg)	Fr	Montoursville Area H.S.	Montoursville, Pennsylvania
11	LHP	Quin Konuszewski	L/L	5 ft 11 in (1.8 m)	182 lb (83 kg)	So	Heritage H.S.	Saginaw, Michigan
12	OF	Caleb Sturtevant	R/R	5 ft 9 in (1.75 m)	187 lb (85 kg)	Fr	Cocalico Seniro H.S.	Denver, Pennsylvania
13	INF	Drew Ripepi	R/R	5 ft 11 in (1.8 m)	225 lb (102 kg)	Fr	Peters Township H.S.	McMurray, Pennsylvania
14	OF	Carlos Martinez	L/L	5 ft 11 in (1.8 m)	197 lb (89 kg)	Fr	P27 Academy	Coamo, Puerto Rico
15	LHP	Ethan Firoved	L/L	5 ft 11 in (1.8 m)	200 lb (91 kg)	RS So	Tallahassee C.C.	Virginia Beach, Virginia
16	INF	Anthony LaSala	R/R	5 ft 8 in (1.73 m)	155 lb (70 kg)	Fr	Hopewell H.S.	Aliquippa, Pennsylvania
17	RHP	Kyle Mosley	R/R	6 ft 0 in (1.83 m)	150 lb (68 kg)	Jr	Hill College	Mansfield, Texas
18	C	Johnny Long	R/R	5 ft 9 in (1.75 m)	174 lb (79 kg)	Jr	Barron G. Collier H.S.	Naples, Florida
19	C	Luke Lambert	R/R	5 ft 7 in (1.7 m)	174 lb (79 kg)	So	West Allegheny Senior H.S.	McDonald, Pennsylvania
20	INF	Cameron Barto	S/R	5 ft 11 in (1.8 m)	175 lb (79 kg)	RS Jr	Lancaster Catholic H.S.	Lancaster, Pennsylvania
21	OF	Kyle Hess	L/R	6 ft 1 in (1.85 m)	200 lb (91 kg)	Sr	Lancaster Catholic H.S.	Mount Joy, Pennsylvania
23	INF	Noah Martinez	L/L	6 ft 5 in (1.96 m)	242 lb (110 kg)	Sr	The Hotchkiss School	New Milford, Connecticut
24	RHP	Dylan Simmons	R/R	6 ft 3 in (1.91 m)	235 lb (107 kg)	Jr	Trinity Christian Academy	Jacksonville, Florida
27	LHP	Zack Oswald	L/L	6 ft 1 in (1.85 m)	190 lb (86 kg)	Jr	Harford C.C.	Hoboken, New Jersey
28	LHP	Sam Falace	L/L	6 ft 1 in (1.85 m)	193 lb (88 kg)	Fr	Colonie Central H.S.	Colonie, New York
29	RHP	Jonathan Bautista	R/R	6 ft 3 in (1.91 m)	202 lb (92 kg)	So	Springside Chestnut Hill Academy	Philadelphia, Pennsylvania
30	RHP	Matthew Fernandez	R/R	5 ft 10 in (1.78 m)	195 lb (88 kg)	Jr	Miami Dade College	Miami, Florida
31	RHP	Kyle Demi	R/R	6 ft 1 in (1.85 m)	221 lb (100 kg)	So	North Allegheny Senior H.S.	Wexford, Pennsylvania
32	RHP	Erubiel Candelario	R/R	6 ft 1 in (1.85 m)	200 lb (91 kg)	Sr	KIPP	New York, New York
33	INF	Jack Anderson	R/R	6 ft 5 in (1.96 m)	217 lb (98 kg)	Sr	Mars Area H.S.	Mars, Pennsylvania
34	LHP	Will Droll	L/L	6 ft 0 in (1.83 m)	194 lb (88 kg)	So	St. Ignatius	Thunder Bay, Ontario
35	C	Jayden Melendez	R/R	5 ft 7 in (1.7 m)	175 lb (79 kg)	So	Westminster Christian School	Miami, Florida
36	RHP	Nash Bryan	R/R	6 ft 1 in (1.85 m)	215 lb (98 kg)	RS Sr	Butler Area H.S.	Butler, Pennsylvania
38	RHP	Holden Phelps	R/R	6 ft 6 in (1.98 m)	195 lb (88 kg)	Jr	Prairie Ridge H.S.	Crystal Lake, Illinois
39	OF	C. J. Funk	R/R	6 ft 0 in (1.83 m)	215 lb (98 kg)	Jr	Bellefonte Area H.S.	Bellefonte, Pennsylvania
40	LHP	Ryan Reed	L/L	6 ft 3 in (1.91 m)	232 lb (105 kg)	Fr	Haverford School	Ridley Park, Pennsylvania
43	RHP	Jack Sokol	R/R	6 ft 3 in (1.91 m)	202 lb (92 kg)	Jr	Pensacola State College	New Albany, Ohio
44		A. J. Nessler	L/R	5 ft 9 in (1.75 m)	185 lb (84 kg)	Fr	Jesuit H.S.	Tampa, Florida
45	INF	Brett Heckert	R/R	6 ft 2 in (1.88 m)	195 lb (88 kg)	Sr	North Allegheny H.S.	Wexford, Pennsylvania
47	RHP	Gavin Lill	R/R	6 ft 4 in (1.93 m)	230 lb (104 kg)	Fr	West Chester East H.S.	West Chester, Pennsylvania
48	RHP	Ryan Slattery	R/R	6 ft 0 in (1.83 m)	250 lb (113 kg)	Fr	TNXL Academy	Windermere, Florida
55	RHP	Logan Evans	R/R	6 ft 4 in (1.93 m)	215 lb (98 kg)	Jr	Saline H.S.	Saline, Michigan

Head coach

Mike Bell

Assistant coach(es)

Joe Mercadante

Hitting coach(es)

Ty Megahee

Base coach(es)

Devin Mesoraco

Legend

- (C) Team captain
- (S) Suspended
- (I) Ineligible
- Injured
- Current redshirt

Roster

== Schedule ==
2023 Pittsburgh Panthers baseball game log
Regular season
February (5–3)

#	Date	Rank	Opponent	Site/stadium	Score	Win	Loss	Save	Attendance	Overall record	ACC record
1	February 17		vs Maine	Ed Smith Complex • Sarasota, Florida	11–10	Bryan (1–0)	Carson (0–1)	Deveraux (1)	–	1–0	–
2	February 18		vs Maine	Ed Smith Complex • Sarasota, Florida	7–11	Holt (1–0)	Firoved (0–1)	Baeyens (1)	–	1–1	–
3	February 19		vs Maine	Ed Smith Complex • Sarasota, Florida	5–8	Gambardella (1–0)	Fernandez (0–1)	Scott (1)	–	1–2	–
4	February 24		vs Harvard	Centennial Park • Port Charlotte, Florida	12–10	Bryan (2–0)	Narottam (0–1)	–	–	2–2	–
5	February 25		vs Harvard	Centennial Park • Port Charlotte, Florida	4–8	Stovern (1–0)	Fernandez (0–2)	–	–	2–3	–
6	February 25		vs Harvard	Centennial Park • Port Charlotte, Florida	11–3 (7)	Sokol (1–0)	Matson (0–1)	Simmons (1)	–	3–3	–
7	February 26		vs Harvard	Centennial Park • Port Charlotte, Florida	17–7 (8)	Bryan (3–0)	Jacobsen (0–1)	–	–	4–3	–
8	February 28		Bucknell	Charles L. Cost Field • Pittsburgh, Pennsylvania	11–8	Konuszewski (1–0)	Farynick (0–1)	Bryan (1)	254	5–3	–

March (7–8)

#	Date	Rank	Opponent	Site/stadium	Score	Win	Loss	Save	Attendance	Overall record	ACC record
9	March 3		vs Mount St. Mary's	Melching Field at Conrad Park • DeLand, Florida	4–7	Adams (2–0)	Mosley (0–1)	Slepak (3)	–	5–4	–
10	March 4		vs Mount St. Mary's	Melching Field at Conrad Park • DeLand, Florida	10–2	Sokol (2–0)	Pryor (0–1)	–	563	6–4	–
11	March 4		at Stetson	Melching Field at Conrad Park • DeLand, Florida	5–6	Durgin (1–1)	Bryan (3–1)	–	821	6–5	–
12	March 5		at Stetson	Melching Field at Conrad Park • DeLand, Florida	9–2	Candelario (1–0)	Jacobs (0–1)	–	672	7–5	–
13	March 7		at South Florida	USF Baseball Stadium • Tampa, Florida	1–2	Hudi (1–1)	Phelps (0–1)	Skeen (1)	982	7–6	–
14	March 10		at Florida State	Mike Martin Field at Dick Howser Stadium • Tallahassee, Florida	2–3	Arnold (1–0)	Bryan (3–2)	None	4,376	7–7	0–1
15	March 11		at Florida State	Mike Martin Field at Dick Howser Stadium • Tallahassee, Florida	3–5	Crowell (3–0)	Mosley (0–2)	Armstrong (2)	6,300	7–8	0–2
16	March 12		at Florida State	Mike Martin Field at Dick Howser Stadium • Tallahassee, Florida	8–6	Fernandez (1–2)	Denison (1–2)	Bautista (1)	4,167	8–8	1–2
17	March 17		#18 North Carolina	Charles L. Cost Field • Pittsburgh, Pennsylvania	7–17	Bovair (2–1)	Sokol (2–1)	None	289	8–9	1–3
18	March 18		#18 North Carolina	Charles L. Cost Field • Pittsburgh, Pennsylvania	Game cancelled						
19	March 19		#18 North Carolina	Charles L. Cost Field • Pittsburgh, Pennsylvania	Game cancelled						
20	March 22		Kent State	Charles L. Cost Field • Pittsburgh, Pennsylvania	8–3	Evans (1–0)	Bickerstaff (0–2)	None	262	9–9	1–3
21	March 24		Virginia Tech	Charles L. Cost Field • Pittsburgh, Pennsylvania	5–4	Simmons (1–0)	Hackenberg (1–3)	Bryan (2)	303	10–9	2–3
22	March 25		Virginia Tech	Charles L. Cost Field • Pittsburgh, Pennsylvania	12–20	Green (1–1)	Mosley (0–3)	None	474	10–10	2–4
23	March 26		Virginia Tech	Charles L. Cost Field • Pittsburgh, Pennsylvania	5–4	Bryan (4–2)	Dean (1–1)	None	529	11–10	3–4
24	March 28		at Penn State	Medlar Field • University Park, Pennsylvania	8–16	Molsky (1–2)	Simmons (1–1)	None	1,076	11–11	3–4
25	March 31		at Duke	Jack Coombs Field • Durham, North Carolina	13–1	Sokol (3–1)	Santucci (2–2)	None	1,073	12–11	4–4

April (8–10)

#	Date	Rank	Opponent	Site/stadium	Score	Win	Loss	Save	Attendance	Overall record	ACC record
26	April 1		at Duke	Jack Coombs Field • Durham, North Carolina	7–11	Oschell III (3–0)	Bautista (0–1)	None	671	12–12	4–5
27	April 2		at Duke	Jack Coombs Field • Durham, North Carolina	0–8	Weaver (3–1)	Evans (1–1)	None	466	12–13	4–6
28	April 4		at Youngstown State	Eastwood Field • Niles, Ohio	13–7	Candelario (2–0)	Stayduhar (0–1)	None	300	13–13	4–6
29	April 6		Notre Dame	Charles L. Cost Field • Pittsburgh, Pennsylvania	8–10	Mercer (2–0)	Sokol (3–2)	Cooper (2)	362	13–14	4–7
30	April 7		Notre Dame	Charles L. Cost Field • Pittsburgh, Pennsylvania	2–11	Tyrell (6–1)	Mosley (0–4)	None	517	13–15	4–8
31	April 8		Notre Dame	Charles L. Cost Field • Pittsburgh, Pennsylvania	9–5	Bryan (5–2)	Cooper (2–1)	None	895	14–15	5–8
32	April 10		Youngstown State	Charles L. Cost Field • Pittsburgh, Pennsylvania	4–9	Gumto (1–1)	Bautista (0–2)	None	272	14–16	5–8
33	April 11		at Kent State	Schoonover Stadium • Kent, Ohio	2–5	Roebuck (3–1)	Candelario (2–1)	Scott (6)	252	14–17	5–8
34	April 14		at No. 7 Virginia	Davenport Field at Disharoon Park • Charlottesville, Virginia	7–5	Sokol (4–2)	Edgington (6–1)	None	3,817	15–17	6–8
35	April 15		at No. 7 Virginia	Davenport Field at Disharoon Park • Charlottesville, Virginia	6–4	Evans (2–1)	Berry 0–3	None	5,309	16–17	7–8
36	April 16		at No. 7 Virginia	Davenport Field at Disharoon Park • Charlottesville, Virginia	5–8	O'Connor (4–1)	Bautista (0–3)	Wollfolk (5)	4,684	16–18	7–9
37	April 19		vs West Virginia	PNC Park • Pittsburgh, Pennsylvania	4–9	Van Kempen (2–0)	Fernandez (1–3)	None	2,052	16–19	7–9
38	April 21		No. 2 Wake Forest	Charles L. Cost Field • Pittsburgh, Pennsylvania	3–0	Sokol (5–2)	Sullivan (5–2)	Bryan (5)	589	17–19	8–9
39	April 22		No. 2 Wake Forest	Charles L. Cost Field • Pittsburgh, Pennsylvania	4–23	Lowder (8–0)	Evans (2–2)	–	575	17–20	8–10
40	April 23		No. 2 Wake Forest	Charles L. Cost Field • Pittsburgh, Pennsylvania	1–17	Hartle (7–2)	Mosley (0–5)	–	487	17–21	8–11
41	April 28		California	Charles L. Cost Field • Pittsburgh, Pennsylvania	14–6	Sokol (5–2)	Turkington (0–2)	–	329	18–21	–
42	April 29		California	Charles L. Cost Field • Pittsburgh, Pennsylvania	5–3	Evans (3–1)	Pasqualott (2–1)	Bryan (6)	425	19–21	–
43	April 30		California	Charles L. Cost Field • Pittsburgh, Pennsylvania	10–5	Mosley (1–4)	Sullivan (2–4)	–	262	20–21	–

May (3–9)

#	Date	Rank	Opponent	Site/stadium	Score	Win	Loss	Save	Attendance	Overall record	ACC record
44	May 3		at No. 12 West Virginia	Monongalia County Ballpark • Morgantown, West Virginia	0–10	Estridge (3–0)	Candelario (2–2)	–	4,070	20–22	–
45	May 5		at Georgia Tech	Russ Chandler Stadium • Atlanta, Georgia	1–11	Schmolke (5–3)	Sokol (5–3)	–	951	20–23	8–12
46	May 6		at Georgia Tech	Russ Chandler Stadium • Atlanta, Georgia	5–0	Evans (4–2)	Finateri (2–2)	–	1,045	21–23	9–12
47	May 7		at Georgia Tech	Russ Chandler Stadium • Atlanta, Georgia	3–15	King (5–0)	Mosley (1–6)	–	1,233	21–24	9–13
48	May 10		No. 12 West Virginia	Charles L. Cost Field • Pittsburgh, Pennsylvania	8–9	Short (4–0)	Candelario (2–3)	Reed (6)	642	21–25	–
49	May 12		No. 11 Miami (FL)	Charles L. Cost Field • Pittsburgh, Pennsylvania	8–9	Ziehl (7–4)	Sokol (6–4)	Walters (8)	563	21–26	9–14
50	May 13		No. 11 Miami (FL)	Charles L. Cost Field • Pittsburgh, Pennsylvania	7–4	Evans (5–1)	Rosario (3–6)	Bryan (7)	437	22–26	10–14
51	May 14		No. 11 Miami (FL)	Charles L. Cost Field • Pittsburgh, Pennsylvania	4–5	Torres (4–0)	Fernandez (1–4)	Walters (9)	536	22–27	10–15
52	May 16		vs Penn State	PNC Park • Pittsburgh, Pennsylvania	11–3	Holden (1–1)	Partridge (1–1)	–	–	23–27	–
53	May 18		at NC State	Doak Field • Raleigh, North Carolina	2–7	Whitaker (4–3)	Sokol (6–5)	–	2,620	23–28	10–16
54	May 19		at NC State	Doak Field • Raleigh, North Carolina	8–17	Britton (3–2)	Simmons (1–2)	Fritton (3)	2,853	23–29	10–17
55	May 20		at NC State	Doak Field • Raleigh, North Carolina	2–8	Highfill (6–2)	Mosley (1–7)	–	2,880	23–30	10–18

Postseason (1–1)

ACC Tournament (1–1)
Date	Opponent	Rank	Site/stadium	Score	Win	Loss	Save	TV	Attendance	Overall record	ACCT record
May 24	vs. Notre Dame		Durham Bulls Athletic Park; Durham, NC	9–5	Simmons (2–2)	Tyrell (8–3)	Bryan (8)	ACCN	2,086	24–30	1–0
May 25	vs. No. 1 Wake Forest		Durham Bulls Athletic Park; Durham, NC	L 2–10	Lowder (13–0)	Evans (5–3)	–	ACCN	3,322	24–31	1–1
