= 2023 Virginia Tech Hokies baseball team =

American college baseball season

2023 Virginia Tech Hokies baseball
- Conference: Atlantic Coast Conference
- Record: 30–23 (12–17 ACC)
- Head coach: John Szefc (6th season)
- Assistant coaches: Kurt Elbin (6th season); Tyler Hanson (5th season)
- Pitching coach: Ryan Fecteau (6th season)
- Home stadium: English Field

2023 Atlantic Coast Conference baseball standings
	Conf.				Overall
Team	W		L	PCT	W		L	PCT
Atlantic
No. 3 Wake Forest ^{x}‍‍‍^{y}	22	–	7	.759	54	–	12	.818
No. 18 Clemson ‍‍‡‍^{y}	20	–	10	.667	44	–	19	.698
Boston College ‍‍‍^{y}	16	–	14	.533	37	–	20	.649
Notre Dame ‍‍‍	15	–	15	.500	30	–	24	.556
NC State ‍‍‍^{y}	13	–	16	.448	36	–	21	.632
Louisville ‍‍‍	10	–	20	.333	31	–	24	.564
Florida State ‍‍‍	9	–	21	.300	23	–	31	.426
Coastal
No. 6 Virginia ^{x}‍‍‍^{y}	19	–	11	.633	50	–	13	.794
No. 20 Miami (FL) ‍‍‍^{y}	18	–	12	.600	42	–	21	.667
No. 15 Duke ‍‍‍^{y}	16	–	13	.552	39	–	23	.629
North Carolina ‍‍‍^{y}	14	–	14	.500	36	–	24	.600
Virginia Tech ‍‍‍	12	–	17	.414	30	–	23	.566
Georgia Tech ‍‍‍	12	–	18	.400	30	–	27	.526
Pittsburgh ‍‍‍	10	–	18	.357	24	–	31	.436
x – Division champion ‡ – Tournament champion y – Invited to the NCAA tournament As of June 25, 2023; Rankings from D1Baseball

The 2023 Virginia Tech Hokies baseball team represented Virginia Tech during the 2023 NCAA Division I baseball season. The Hokies played their home games at English Field as members of the Atlantic Coast Conference. They were led by head coach John Szefc, in his 6th season at Virginia Tech.

The Hokies finished the season 30–23 overall and 12–17 in ACC play to finish in fifth place in the Coastal Division. They were the tenth overall seed in the ACC Tournament and were placed into a pool with third seed Clemson and sixth seed Boston College. Virginia Tech lost both of their pool play games to be eliminated from the tournament. They did not receive a bid to the NCAA Tournament.

== Game log ==
2023 Virginia Tech Hokies baseball game log
Regular season (30–21)

February (6–2)
Date	Opponent	Rank	Site/stadium	Score	Win	Loss	Save	TV	Attendance	Overall record	ACC Record
February 17	at College of Charleston*	No. 14	Patriot's Point Baseball Stadium; Mount Pleasant, SC	**L** 2–5	Andrew Duval (1–0)	**Jonah Hurney (0–1)**	Will Privette (1)	ESPN+	841	0–1	—
February 18	at College of Charleston*	No. 14	Patriot's Point Baseball Stadium	**W** 12–3	**Henry Weycker (1–0)**	Drake Thames (0–1)	—	ESPN+	1,109	1–1	—
February 19	at College of Charleston*	No. 14	Patriot's Point Baseball Stadium	**W** 15–2	**Grant Umberger (1–0)**	Aidan Hunter (0–1)	—	ESPN+	1,076	2–1	—
February 21	East Tennessee State*	No. 14	English Field; Blacksburg, VA	**W** 15–5	**Kiernan Higgins (1–0)**	Landon Smiddy (0–1)	—	VTSN	1,134	3–1	—
February 24	Bryant*	No. 14	English Field	**L** 3–7	Cameron Picard (1–0)	**Griffin Green (0–1)**	—	ACCNX	1,235	3–2	—
February 25	Bryant*	No. 14	English Field	**W** 4–1	**Drue Hackenberg (1–0)**	Ken Turner (0–1)	**Henry Weycker (1)**	ACCNX	903	4–2	—
February 26	Bryant*	No. 14	English Field	**W** 15–8	**Jonah Hurney (1–1)**	Logan Fraiser (0–2)	—	ACCNX	1,141	5–2	—
New River Valley Series
February 28	Radford*	No. 11	English Field	**W** 17–2	**Chrisitan Worley (1–0)**	Foster Seitz (0–2)	—	ACCNX	1,007	6–2	—

March (7–6)
Date	Opponent	Rank	Site/stadium	Score	Win	Loss	Save	TV	Attendance	Overall record	ACC Record
March 3	Charlotte*	No. 11	English Field	**W** 13–11 (10)	**Tyler Dean (1–0)**	Evan Michelson (0–1)	—	ACCNX	614	7–2	—
March 4	Charlotte*	No. 11	English Field	**W** 6–3	**Chrisitan Worley (2–0)**	Collin Kramer (0–1)	—	ACCNX	1,237	8–2	—
March 5	Charlotte*	No. 11	English Field	**W** 12–4	**Grant Umberger (2–0)**	Miles Langhorne (1–1)	—	ACCNX	1,049	9–2	—
March 7	UMass Lowell*	No. 11	English Field	**W** 22–4	**Matthew Siverling (1–0)**	Shane Bogli (0–1)	—	ACCNX	747	10–2	—
March 8	UMass Lowell*	No. 11	English Field	**W** 7–4	**Andrew Sentlinger (1–0)**	Frankie Venezia (0–1)	**Honah Hurney (1)**	ACCNX	534	11–2	—
March 10	Boston College	No. 11	English Field	**W** 13–3	**Henry Weycker (2–0)**	John West (1–1)	—	ACCNX	552	12–2	1–0
March 11	Boston College	No. 11	English Field	**L** 5–8	Chris Flynn (4–0)	**Drue Hackenberg (1–1)**	Andrew Roman (2)	ACCNX	674	12–3	1–1
March 11	Boston College	No. 11	English Field	**L** 3–7	Eric Schroeder (3–0)	**Anthony Arguelles (0–1)**	—	ACCNX	586	12–4	1–2
March 14	at East Tennessee State*	No. 17	Thomas Stadium; Johnson City, TN	Postponed							
March 17	at Miami (FL)	No. 17	Alex Rodriguez Park; Coral Gables, FL	**L** 3–4	Carlos Lequerica (2–0)	**Henry Weycker (1–2)**	—	ACCN	2,784	12–5	1–3
March 18	at Miami (FL)	No. 17	Alex Rodriguez Park	**L** 6–21	Ziehl Gage (3–2)	**Drue Hackenberg (1–2)**	—	ACCNX	2,606	12–6	1–4
March 19	at Miami (FL)	No. 17	Alex Rodriguez Park	**L** 9–12	Alejandro Torres (2–0)	**Kiernan Higgins (1–1)**	Andrew Walters (1)	ACCNX	2,606	12–7	1–5
I-81 Series
March 22	VMI*		English Field	**W** 11–0	**Andrew Sentlinger (2–0)**	James Newsome (0–1)	—	ACCNX	702	13–7	—
March 24	at Pittsburgh*		Charles L. Cost Field; Pittsburgh, PA	**L** 4–5	Dylan Simmons (1–)	**Drue Hackenberg (1–3)**	Nash Bryan (2)	ACCNX	303	13–8	1–6
March 25	at Pittsburgh*		Charles L. Cost Field	**W** 20–12	**Griffin Green (1–1)**	Kyle Mosley (0–3)	—	ACCNX	474	14–8	2–6
March 26	at Pittsburgh*		Charles L. Cost Field	**L** 4–5	Nash Bryan (4–2)	**Tyler Dean (1–1)**	—	ACCNX	529	14–9	2–7
I-81 Series
March 28	at VMI*		Gray–Minor Stadium; Lexington, VA	**W** 9–7	**Jonah Hurney (2–1)**	Hunter Sipe (1–1)	**Andrew Sentlinger (1)**		322	15–9	—
Commonwealth Series
March 31	Virginia		English Field	**L** 5–9	Briand Edginton (5–0)	**Drue Hackenberg (1–4)**	—	ACCN	1,320	15–10	2–8

April (10–6)
Date	Opponent	Rank	Site/stadium	Score	Win	Loss	Save	TV	Attendance	Overall record	ACC Record
Commonwealth Series
April 1	Virginia		English Field	**W** 12–10	**Henry Weycker (3–1)**	Connely Early (6–1)	**Johnah Hurney (2)**	ACCNX	2,202	16–10	3–8
April 2	Virginia		English Field	**W** 12–7	**Kiernan Higgins (2–1)**	Jake Berry (0–2)	—	ACCNX	2,068	17–10	4–8
April 7	at Duke		Durham Bulls Athletic Park; Durham, NC	Canceled				ACCN			
April 9	at Duke		Durham Bulls Athletic Park	**L** 1–3	Alex Gow (3–2)	**Griffin Green (1–2)**	James Tallon (6)	ACCN	—	17–11	4–9
April 9	at Duke		Durham Bulls Athletic Park	**W** 5–2	**Drue Hackenberg (2–4)**	Jason White (2–2)	—	ACCNX	1,226	18–11	5–9
April 11	Liberty*		English Field	**L** 3–7	Trey Cooper (1–2)	**Grant Umberger (2–1)**	—	ACCNX	877	18–12	—
April 14	Georgia Tech		English Field	**W** 10–7	**Brady Kirtner (1–0)**	Luke Schmolke (4–2)	None	ACCNX	1,047	19–12	6–9
April 15	Georgia Tech		English Field	**W** 13–1	**Griffin Green (2–2)**	Dalton Smith (2–1)	—	ACCNX	3,086	20–12	7–9
April 16	Georgia Tech		English Field	**W** 9–2	**Drue Hackenberg (3–4)**	Terry Busse (1–2)	—	ACCNX	952	21–12	8–9
New River Valley Series
April 18	at Radford*		Radford Baseball Stadium; Radford, VA	**L** 8–16	Gannon Kadlecik (1–0)	**Andrew Sentlinger (2–1)**	None	ESPN+	340	21–13	—
April 21	at Florida State		Dick Howser Stadium; Tallahassee, FL	**W** 24–9	**Anthony Arguelles (1–1)**	Jackson Baumeister (2–4)	—	ACCN	4,262	22–13	9–9
April 22	at Florida State		Dick Howser Stadium	**W** 4–3	**Drue Hackenberg (4–4)**	Connor Whittaker (3–5)	—	ACCNX	4,601	23–13	10–9
April 23	at Florida State		Dick Howser Stadium	**L** 3–4	Jamie Arnold (2–4)	**Jacob Exum (0–1)**	Doug Kirkland (1)	ACCNX	4,472	23–14	10–10
April 25	James Madison*		English Field	**W** 7–5	**Matthew Siverling (2–0)**	Matt Leikus (0–1)	**Henry Weycker (2)**	ACCNX	789	24–14	—
April 28	North Carolina		English Field	**W** 7–0	**Anthony Arguelles (2–1)**	Connor Bovair (4–2)	—	ACCN	658	25–14	11–10
April 29	North Carolina		English Field	**L** 8–12	Max Carlson (3–1)	**Drue Hackenberg (4–5)**	Matt Poston (3)	ACCNX	2,231	25–15	11–11
April 29	North Carolina		English Field	**L** 7–13	Ben Peterson (2–0)	**Kiernan Higgins (2–2)**	—	ACCNX	2,363	25–16	11–12

May (5–5)
Date	Opponent	Rank	Site/stadium	Score	Win	Loss	Save	TV	Attendance	Overall record	ACC Record
Charleston Showcase
May 2	vs. Marshall		GoMart Ballpark; Charleston, WV	Canceled				WCHS			—
May 3	Marshall		English Field	**W** 5–3	**Andrew Sentlinger (4–1)**	Chad Heiner (1–2)	**Jacob Exum** (1)	ACCNX	623	26–16	—
May 6	Bowling Green*		English Field	**W** 13–2	**Anthony Arguelles** (3–1)	Gage Schenk (2–6)	—	ACCNX	814	27–16	—
May 6	Bowling Green*		English Field	**W** 12–0	**Drue Hackenberg (5–5)**	Rigo Ramos (2–3)	—	ACCNX	910	28–16	—
May 7	Bowling Green*		English Field	No Contest				ACCNX			—
May 10	at Liberty*		Liberty Baseball Stadium; Lynchburg, VA	**W** 14–1 (7)	**Jonah Hurney** (3–1)	Ryan Butler (0–1)	—	ESPN+	1,682	29–16	—
May 12	No. 16 Clemson		Woerner Field	**L** 4–15	Jackson Lindley (2–3)	**Drue Hackenberg (5–6)**	—	ACCNX	1,461	29–17	11–13
May 13	No. 16 Clemson		English Field	**L** 8–9	Nick Clayton (6–0)	**Brady Kirtner (1–1)**	Tristan Smith (3)	ACCN	1,485	29–18	11–14
May 14	No. 16 Clemson		English Field	**L** 6–9	Caden Grice (6–1)	**Jonah Hurney** (3–2)	Tristan Smith (4)	ACCN		29–19	11–15
May 16	at James Madison*		Veterans Memorial Park; Harrisonburg, VA	Canceled							—
May 18	at No. 1 Wake Forest		David F. Couch Ballpark; Winston-Salem, NC	**L** 3–6	Rhett Lowder (12–0)	**Drue Hackenberg (5–7)**	Camden Minacci (11)	ESPN+	2,505	29–20	11–16
May 19	at No. 1 Wake Forest		David F. Couch Ballpark	**L** 5–7	Cole Roland (2–1)	**Henry Weycker** (3–2)	Camden Minacci (12)	ESPN+	3,023	29–21	11–17
May 20	at No. 1 Wake Forest		David F. Couch Ballpark	**W** 14–6	**Griffin Stieg (1–0)**	Seth Keener (6–1)	—	ESPN+	2,568	30–21	12–17

Postseason (0–2)

ACC Tournament (0–2)
Date	Opponent	Rank	Site/stadium	Score	Win	Loss	Save	TV	Attendance	Overall record	ACCT Record
May 23	vs. Boston College		Durham Bulls Athletic Park; Durham, NC	**L** 7–11	Henry Leake (4–5)	**Henry Weycker** (3–3)	Andrew Roman (9)	ACCN	2,048	30–22	0–1
May 24	vs. No. 6 Clemson		Durham Bulls Athletic Park; Durham, NC	**L** 5–14	BJ Bailey (2–2)	**Drue Hackenberg (5–8)**	—	ACCN	2,398	30–23	0–2

Legend: = Win = Loss = Canceled
Bold = Virginia Tech team member
"*" indicates a non-conference game.
"#" represents ranking. All rankings are based on the team's current ranking in the D1Baseball poll.
"()" represents postseason seeding in the ACC Tournament or NCAA Regional, respectively.

== Rankings ==
Ranking movements Legend: ██ Increase in ranking ██ Decrease in ranking — = Not ranked RV = Received votes
	Week																		
Poll	Pre	1	2	3	4	5	6	7	8	9	10	11	12	13	14	15	16	17	Final
Coaches'	16	16*	11	10	16	RV	RV	—	—	RV	—	—	—	—	—	—	—*	—*	—
Baseball America	13	14	13	11	15	—	—	—	—	—	—	—	—	—	—	—	—*	—*	—
Collegiate Baseball^	28	29	28	28	29	—	—	—	—	—	—	—	—	—	—	—	—	—	—
NCBWA†	18	18	14	11	17	RV	—	RV	RV	RV	—	—	—	—	—	—	—	—*	—
D1Baseball	14	14	11	11	17	—	—	—	—	—	—	—	—	—	—	—	—*	—*	—

^ Collegiate Baseball ranked 40 teams in their preseason poll, but only ranked 30 teams weekly during the season.
† NCBWA ranks 30 teams in their preseason poll, but only ranks 25 teams weekly during the season.
* A new poll was not released for this week, so for comparison purposes, the previous week's ranking is inserted in this week's slot.
