= 2023 North Carolina Tar Heels baseball team =

American college baseball season

2023 North Carolina Tar Heels baseball

Terre Haute Regional, 1–2
- Conference: Atlantic Coast Conference
- Record: 36–24 (14–14 ACC)
- Head coach: Scott Forbes (3rd season)
- Assistant coaches: Bryant Gaines (13th season); Jesse Wierzbicki (7th season); Jason Howell (3rd season)
- Home stadium: Boshamer Stadium

2023 Atlantic Coast Conference baseball standings
	Conf.				Overall
Team	W		L	PCT	W		L	PCT
Atlantic
No. 3 Wake Forest ^{x}‍‍‍^{y}	22	–	7	.759	54	–	12	.818
No. 18 Clemson ‍‍‡‍^{y}	20	–	10	.667	44	–	19	.698
Boston College ‍‍‍^{y}	16	–	14	.533	37	–	20	.649
Notre Dame ‍‍‍	15	–	15	.500	30	–	24	.556
NC State ‍‍‍^{y}	13	–	16	.448	36	–	21	.632
Louisville ‍‍‍	10	–	20	.333	31	–	24	.564
Florida State ‍‍‍	9	–	21	.300	23	–	31	.426
Coastal
No. 6 Virginia ^{x}‍‍‍^{y}	19	–	11	.633	50	–	13	.794
No. 20 Miami (FL) ‍‍‍^{y}	18	–	12	.600	42	–	21	.667
No. 15 Duke ‍‍‍^{y}	16	–	13	.552	39	–	23	.629
North Carolina ‍‍‍^{y}	14	–	14	.500	36	–	24	.600
Virginia Tech ‍‍‍	12	–	17	.414	30	–	23	.566
Georgia Tech ‍‍‍	12	–	18	.400	30	–	27	.526
Pittsburgh ‍‍‍	10	–	18	.357	24	–	31	.436
x – Division champion ‡ – Tournament champion y – Invited to the NCAA tournament As of June 25, 2023; Rankings from D1Baseball

The 2023 North Carolina Tar Heels baseball team represented the University of North Carolina at Chapel Hill in the 2023 NCAA Division I baseball season. The Tar Heels played their home games at Boshamer Stadium, and were a member of the Atlantic Coast Conference. They were led by head coach Scott Forbes, who was in his third season. He was assisted by Bryant Gaines, Jesse Wierzbicki, and Jason Howell. Dave Arendas served as director of operations.

The Tar Heels finished 36–24 overall and 14–14 in ACC play to finish in fourth place in the Coastal Division. They finished tied for seventh/eight in seeding for the ACC Tournament. They won the tiebreaker and were the seventh seed for the tournament. They were placed in a Pool with second seed Virginia and eleventh seed Georgia Tech. The Tar Heels won both of their pool games and advanced to the Semifinals, where they lost to eventual champions Clemson. They received an at-large bid to the NCAA Tournament and were placed as the third seed in the Terre Haute regional. They lost to Iowa in the opening game, but defeated Wright State to force an elimination game versus Iowa. The Tar Heels lost 6–5 in thirteen innings to end their season.

== Previous season ==
In Forbes' second year at the helm, the Tar Heels improved from their 2021 campaign. Finishing the season 42–22, the 2022 Tar Heels won the ACC Tournament and hosted both an NCAA Tournament Regional and Super Regional. Freshman sensation Vance Honeycutt broke out in a big way, leading the Tar Heels in many batting statistics en route to winning the ACC Freshman of the Year award. They were swept by Arkansas in the Chapel Hill Super Regional, denying Forbes his first College World Series appearance as a head coach.

== Personnel ==
=== Roster ===
Class Listing as reflected on GoHeels.com

2023 North Carolina Tar Heels roster
Pitchers: 14 - Justin Szestowicki - (redshirt) Freshman; 15 - Cameron Padgett - Freshman; 24 - Matthew Matthijs - Freshman; 25 - Ben Peterson - Junior; 26 - Kyle Percival - Freshman; 27 - Connor Bovair - Junior; 29 - Kevin Eaise - Graduate; 31 - Alden Segui - Sophomore; 35 - Max Carlson - Junior; 36 - Nik Pry - 5th; 38 - Matt Poston - Junior; 40 - Michael Colonna - Freshman; 41 - Will Sandy - 5th; 42 - Jake Knapp - Graduate; 43 - Nelson Berkwich - Junior; 44 - Carson Starnes - Sophomore; 46 - Will Simmons - Freshman; 47 - Nick Argento - (redshirt) Freshman; 48 - Connor Hegan - Freshman; 49 - Dalton Pence - Sophomore; 53 - Caleb Crain - Freshman	Catchers: 5 - Eric Grintz - Junior; 52 - Tomas Frick - Junior; Infielders: 3 - Colby Wilkerson - Junior; 4 - Austin Hawke - Freshman; 6 - Jackson Van De Brake - Sophomore; 10 - Mac Horvath - Junior; 19 - Johnny Castagnozzi - Junior; 45 - Hunter Stokely - Junior	Outfielders: 1 - Bryce Blaser - Freshman; 2 - Reece Holbrook - Sophomore; 7 - Vance Honeycutt - Sophomore; 11 - John Long - Freshman; 18 - Jackson Rusiecki - Freshman; 39 - Carter French - Freshman; Utility: 8 - Patrick Alvarez (INF/OF) - Junior; 12 - Jesse Jaconski (INF/OF) - Freshman; 16 - Casey Cook (INF/OF) - (redshirt) Freshman; 17 - Joe Jaconski (INF/OF) - Sophomore; 23 - Alberto Osuna (1B/DH) - Junior; 28 - Dylan King (C/OF) - (redshirt) Freshman; 54 - Max Riemer (C/OF) - (redshirt) Senior

=== Coaching staff ===
2023 North Carolina Tar Heels coaching staff
Name	Position	Seasons	Alma mater
Scott Forbes	Head coach	3	NC Wesleyan (1998)
Bryant Gaines	Assistant Head Coach/Recruiting Coordinator	13	North Carolina (2011)
Jesse Wierzbicki	Assistant Coach	7	North Carolina (2011)
Jason Howell	Assistant Coach	3	North Carolina (2002)
Dave Arendas	Director of Baseball Operations	18	North Carolina (1990)

== Schedule and results ==
Legend
	Win
	Loss
	Postponement
**Bold**	North Carolina team member
*	Non-Conference game
†	Make-Up Game

2023 North Carolina Tar Heels Baseball Schedule & Results
Regular season
February (5–3)

Date	Opponent	Rank	Site/Stadium	Score	Win	Loss	Save	Attendance	Overall Record	ACC Record
February 17	Seton Hall*	No. 12	Boshamer Stadium; Chapel Hill, NC	**L** 8–10	Payero (1–0)	**Eaise** (0–1)	None	2,582	0–1	–
February 18	Seton Hall*	No. 12	Boshamer Stadium	**W** 11–2	**Padgett** (1–0)	Frontera (0–1)	None	3,049	1–1	–
February 19	Seton Hall*	No. 12	Boshamer Stadium	**W** 4–2	**Pence** (1–0)	Downing (0–1)	**Peterson** (1)	2,632	2–1	–
February 21	Radford*	No. 12	Boshamer Stadium	**W** 14–2	**Percival** (1–0)	Seitz (0–1)	None	2,324	3–1	–
February 22	Longwood*	No. 12	Boshamer Stadium	**W** 10–0	**Knapp** (1–0)	Taylor (0–1)	**Eaise** (1)	2,013	4–1	–
February 24	at No. 11 East Carolina*	No. 12	Clark–LeClair Stadium; Greenville, NC	**L** 5–6	Lunsford-Shenkman (1–1)	**Pence** (1–1)	Root (1)	6,003	4–2	–
February 25	at No. 11 East Carolina*	No. 12	Clark–LeClair Stadium	Postponed (inclement weather) Makeup: May 3						
February 26	No. 11 East Carolina*	No. 12	Boshamer Stadium	**L** 5–6	Ritchie (1–0)	**Szestowicki** (0–1)	Spivey (1)	4,042	4–3	–
February 28	VCU*	No. 13	Boshamer Stadium	**W** 10–4	**Peterson** (1–0)	Peters (1–1)	None	1,974	5–3	–

March (14–4)

Date	Opponent	Rank	Site/Stadium	Score	Win	Loss	Save	Attendance	Overall Record	ACC Record
March 1	VCU*	No. 13	Boshamer Stadium	**W** 14–10	**Eaise** (1–1)	Walton (0–1)	None	2,028	6–3	–
March 3	Stony Brook*	No. 13	Boshamer Stadium	**W** 3–2 (11)	**Poston** (1–0)	O'Neill (0–2)	None	2,104	7–3	–
March 4	Stony Brook*	No. 13	Boshamer Stadium	**W** 7–5	**Bovair** (1–0)	Fero (0–2)	None	1,338	8–3	–
March 5	Stony Brook*	No. 13	Boshamer Stadium	**W** 15–4	**Knapp** (2–0)	Smink (0–3)	None	2,902	9–3	–
March 7	Western Carolina*	No. 14	Boshamer Stadium	**W** 8–4 (5)	**Percival** (2–0)	Bright (0–1)	None	2,334	10–3	–
March 8	Penn State*	No. 14	Boshamer Stadium	**W** 15–5	**Berkwich** (1–0)	Miller (1–2)	None	1,896	11–3	–
March 10	No. 17 Virginia	No. 14	Boshamer Stadium	**L** 3–7	Tonas (1–0)	**Carlson** (0–1)	Berry (2)	1,960	11–4	0–1
March 11	No. 17 Virginia	No. 14	Boshamer Stadium	**L** 4–8	Hodorovich (1–0)	**Bovair** (1–1)	None	3,162	11–5	0–2
March 11	No. 17 Virginia	No. 14	Boshamer Stadium	**W** 6–0	**Poston** (2–0)	O'Connor (1–1)	None	3,103	12–5	1–2
March 14	at Charlotte*	No. 18	Robert and Mariam Hayes Stadium; Charlotte, NC	**W** 16–3	**Eaise** (2–1)	Spolyar (1–2)	None	1,522	13–5	–
March 15	High Point*	No. 18	Boshamer Stadium	**W** 16–2	**Sandy** (1–0)	Duffy (0–2)	None	1,769	14–5	–
March 17	at Pittsburgh	No. 18	Charles L. Cost Field; Pittsburgh, PA	**W** 17–7	**Bovair** (2–1)	Sokol (2–1)	None	289	15–5	2–2
March 18	at Pittsburgh	No. 18	Charles L. Cost Field	Canceled (inclement weather)						
March 19	at Pittsburgh	No. 18	Charles L. Cost Field	Canceled (inclement weather)						
March 21	NC A&T*	No. 15	Boshamer Stadium	**W** 6–4	**Sandy** (2–0)	Carter (1–1)	**Poston** (1)	2,067	16–5	–
March 23	Duke	No. 15	Boshamer Stadium	**W** 6–3	**Carlson** (1–0)	Porksch (2–1)	**Poston** (2)	3,471	17–5	3–2
March 24	Duke	No. 15	Boshamer Stadium	**L** 5–8	Oschell III (2–0)	**Matthijs** (0–1)	Tallon (4)	4,011	17–6	3–3
March 25	Duke	No. 15	Boshamer Stadium	**W** 5–3	**Knapp** (3–0)	Gow (2–2)	**Sandy** (1)	3,969	18–6	4–3
March 28	No. 19 Coastal Carolina*	No. 13	Boshamer Stadium	**L** 7–12	Sharkey (3–0)	**Berkwich** (1–1)	None	2,554	18–7	–
March 31	at Notre Dame	No. 13	Frank Eck Stadium; South Bend, IN	**W** 10–8	**Berkwich** (2–1)	Bosch (0–1)	**Eaise** (2)	302	19–7	5–3

April (9–9)

Date	Opponent	Rank	Site/Stadium	Score	Win	Loss	Save	Attendance	Overall Record	ACC Record
April 2	at Notre Dame	No. 13	Frank Eck Stadium	**W** 5–2	**Bovair** (3–1)	Findlay (4–1)	**Eaise** (3)	N/A	20–7	6–3
April 2	at Notre Dame	No. 13	Frank Eck Stadium	**L** 1–9	Tyrell (5–1)	**Knapp** (3–1)	None	847	20–8	6–4
April 4	vs. No. 6 South Carolina*	No. 13	Truist Field; Charlotte, NC	**L** 0–5	Proctor (2–0)	**Poston** (2–1)	None	6,277	20–9	–
April 6	at Georgia Tech	No. 13	Russ Chandler Stadium; Atlanta, GA	**W** 8–1	**Carlson** (2–1)	Brown (1–2)	None	1,235	21–9	7–4
April 7	at Georgia Tech	No. 13	Russ Chandler Stadium	**W** 10–6	**Bovair** (4–1)	Schmolke (4–1)	None	1,076	22–9	8–4
April 7	at Georgia Tech	No. 13	Russ Chandler Stadium	**L** 4–8	King (3–0)	**Knapp** (3–2)	None	1,427	22–10	8–5
April 11	Queens*	No. 13	Boshamer Stadium	**W** 10–6	**Padgett** (2–0)	Offschanka (0–4)	**Eaise** (4)	2,572	23–10	–
April 13	Miami (FL)	No. 13	Boshamer Stadium	**L** 4–5	Walters (3–0)	**Eaise** (2–2)	None	3,587	23–11	8–6
April 14	Miami (FL)	No. 13	Boshamer Stadium	**W** 9–8 (11)	**Pry** (1–0)	Gallo (0–3)	None	3,054	24–11	9–6
April 15	Miami (FL)	No. 13	Boshamer Stadium	**L** 3–4	Chestnutt (3–0)	**Knapp** (3–3)	Torres (2)	3,694	24–12	9–7
April 18	Charlotte*	No. 18	Boshamer Stadium	**W** 5–3	**Pence** (2–1)	Kramer (2–3)	**Eaise** (5)	2,959	25–12	–
April 21	No. 20 Boston College	No. 18	Boshamer Stadium	**L** 8–9 (10)	Roman (2–0)	**Eaise** (2–3)	Tonghini (2)	4,012	25–13	9–8
April 22	No. 20 Boston College	No. 18	Boshamer Stadium	**L** 4–9	Coon (1–0)	**Berkwich** (2–2)	Ryan (2)	2,991	25–14	9–9
April 23	No. 20 Boston College	No. 18	Boshamer Stadium	**L** 2–6	Schroeder (5–2)	**Padgett** (2–1)	None	3,595	25–15	9–10
April 25	UNCW*		Boshamer Stadium	**W** 18–2	**Pence** (3–1)	Lawson (1–1)	None	2,427	26–15	–
April 28	at Virginia Tech		English Field; Blacksburg, VA	0–7	Arguelles (2–1)	**Bovair** (4–2)	None	658	26–16	9–11
April 29	at Virginia Tech		English Field	**W** 12–8	**Carlson** (3–1)	Hackenberg (4–5)	**Poston** (3)	2,231	27–16	10–11
April 29	at Virginia Tech		English Field	**W** 13–7	**Peterson** (2–0)	Higgins (2–2)	None	2,363	28–16	11–11

May (5–5)

Date	Opponent	Rank	Site/Stadium	Score	Win	Loss	Save	Attendance	Overall Record	ACC Record
May 2	No. 13 Campbell*		Boshamer Stadium	**L** 5–6	Cummings (3–1)	**Poston** (2–2)	Rund (5)	3,163	28–17	–
May 3	at No. 14 East Carolina*		Clark–LeClair Stadium	**W** 2–1	**Pence** (4–1)	Hunter (3–2)	**Carlson** (1)	5,991	29–17	–
May 9	Gardner–Webb*		Boshamer Stadium	**W** 5–4	**Eaise** (3–3)	Fox (3–3)	**Poston** (4)	2,955	30–17	–
May 11	NC State		Boshamer Stadium	**W** 9–8	**Poston** (3–2)	Fritton (3–4)	None	3,242	31–17	12–11
May 12	NC State		Boshamer Stadium	**W** 9–3	**Carlson** (5–3)	Willadsen (5–4)	None	3,584	32–17	13–11
May 13	NC State		Boshamer Stadium	**W** 12–2	**Knapp** (4–3)	Highfill (5–2)	None	3,502	33–17	14–11
May 16	at No. 8 Coastal Carolina*		Springs Brooks Stadium; Conway, SC	**L** 6–8	Billings (2–0)	**Bovair** (4–3)	Sharkey (7)	2,322	33–18	–
May 18	at No. 7 Clemson		Doug Kingsmore Stadium; Clemson, SC	**L** 7–14	Clayton (7–0)	**Carlson** (4–2)	None	4,102	33–19	14–12
May 19	at No. 7 Clemson		Doug Kingsmore Stadium	**L** 4–5	Ammons (2–0)	**Poston** (3–3)	None	4,644	33–20	14–13
May 20	at No. 7 Clemson		Doug Kingsmore Stadium	**L** 3–1	Grice (7–1)	**Pence** (4–2)	Hughes (2)	4,589	33–21	14–14

Postseason
ACC Tournament (2–1)

Date	Opponent	Rank	Site/Stadium	Score	Win	Loss	Save	Attendance	Overall Record	ACCT Record
May 23	vs. (11) Georgia Tech	(7)	Durham Bulls Athletic Park; Durham, NC	**W** 11–5	**Peterson** (3–0)	King (6–2)	**Poston** (5)	2,048	34–21	1–0
May 25	No. 12 (2) Virginia	(7)	Durham Bulls Athletic Park; Durham, NC	**W** 10–2	**Knapp** (5–3)	Early (10–2)	**Pence** (1)	4,084	35–21	2–0
May 27	No. 6 Clemson	(7)	Durham Bulls Athletic Park; Durham, NC	**L** 4–10	Grice (8–1)	**Bovair** (4–4)	None	3,147	35–22	2–1

NCAA Tournament (1–2)

Date	Opponent	Rank	Site/Stadium	Score	Win	Loss	Save	Attendance	Overall Record	NCAAT Record
June 2	vs. (2) Iowa	(3)	Sycamore Stadium; Terre Haute, IN	**L** 4–5	Marcus (5–2)	**Knapp** (5–4)	Llewellyn (4)	1,690	35–23	0–1
June 3	vs. (4) Wright State	(3)	Sycamore Stadium; Terre Haute, IN	**W** 5–0	**Carlson** (5–2)	Stofel (5–6)	**Pence** (2)	1,624	36–23	1–1
June 4	vs. (2) Iowa	(3)	Sycamore Stadium; Terre Haute, IN	**L** 5–6 (13)	Christophers (5–1)	**Pence** (4–3)	None	1,377	36–24	1–2

Rankings from D1Baseball

== Rankings ==
Ranking movements Legend: ██ Increase in ranking ██ Decrease in ranking — = Not ranked RV = Received votes
	Week																		
Poll	Pre	1	2	3	4	5	6	7	8	9	10	11	12	13	14	15	16	17	Final
Coaches'	12	12*	21	17	20	16	14	15	13	16	RV	RV	RV	RV	RV	RV	RV*	RV*	RV
Baseball America	17	16	22	19	21	19	15	16	13	17	—	—	—	—	—	—	—*	—*	—
Collegiate Baseball^	11	13	21	21	25	21	18	14	14	17	—	—	—	—	—	—	—	—	—
NCBWA†	13	14	19	17	19	15	14	16	13	14	25	RV	RV	RV	RV	RV	RV	RV*	RV
D1Baseball	12	12	13	14	18	15	13	14	13	18	—	—	—	—	—	—	—*	—*	—

^ Collegiate Baseball ranked 40 teams in their preseason poll, but only ranked 30 teams weekly during the season.
† NCBWA ranks 30 teams in their preseason poll, but only ranks 25 teams weekly during the season.
* A new poll was not released for this week, so for comparison purposes, the previous week's ranking is inserted in this week's slot.
