= 2023 Virginia Cavaliers baseball team =

American college baseball season

2023 Virginia Cavaliers baseball

ACC Coastal Division champions Charlottesville Regional champions Charlottesville Super Regional champions

College World Series, 0–2
- Conference: Atlantic Coast Conference

Ranking
- Coaches: No. 6
- CB: No. 7
- Record: 50–15 (19–11 ACC)
- Head coach: Brian O'Connor (20th season)
- Assistant coaches: Kevin McMullan (20th season); Matt Kirby (12th season)
- Pitching coach: Drew Dickinson (4th season)
- Home stadium: Davenport Field

2023 Atlantic Coast Conference baseball standings
	Conf.				Overall
Team	W		L	PCT	W		L	PCT
Atlantic
No. 3 Wake Forest ^{x}‍‍‍^{y}	22	–	7	.759	54	–	12	.818
No. 18 Clemson ‍‍‡‍^{y}	20	–	10	.667	44	–	19	.698
Boston College ‍‍‍^{y}	16	–	14	.533	37	–	20	.649
Notre Dame ‍‍‍	15	–	15	.500	30	–	24	.556
NC State ‍‍‍^{y}	13	–	16	.448	36	–	21	.632
Louisville ‍‍‍	10	–	20	.333	31	–	24	.564
Florida State ‍‍‍	9	–	21	.300	23	–	31	.426
Coastal
No. 6 Virginia ^{x}‍‍‍^{y}	19	–	11	.633	50	–	13	.794
No. 20 Miami (FL) ‍‍‍^{y}	18	–	12	.600	42	–	21	.667
No. 15 Duke ‍‍‍^{y}	16	–	13	.552	39	–	23	.629
North Carolina ‍‍‍^{y}	14	–	14	.500	36	–	24	.600
Virginia Tech ‍‍‍	12	–	17	.414	30	–	23	.566
Georgia Tech ‍‍‍	12	–	18	.400	30	–	27	.526
Pittsburgh ‍‍‍	10	–	18	.357	24	–	31	.436
x – Division champion ‡ – Tournament champion y – Invited to the NCAA tournament As of June 25, 2023; Rankings from D1Baseball

The 2023 Virginia Cavaliers baseball team represented the University of Virginia during the 2023 NCAA Division I baseball season. The Cavaliers played their home games at Davenport Field as a members of the Atlantic Coast Conference. They were led by head coach Brian O'Connor, in his 20th season at Virginia.

The Cavaliers finished the season 50–15 overall and 19–11 in ACC play to finish in first place in the Coastal Division. They were the second overall seed in the ACC Tournament and were placed into a pool with seventh seed North Carolina and eleventh seed Georgia Tech. They defeated Georgia Tech, but lost to North Carolina and did not advance out of pool play. They received an at-large invitation to the NCAA Tournament, and were selected as the seventh overall seed and the hosted a Super Regional. They went 3–0 during the Regional stage of the tournament defeating Army and East Carolina twice to advance to the Super Regional stage. They hosted fellow ACC team Duke and won the series 2–1 despite losing the first game. The Cavailers advanced to their sixth College World Series in program history, but their stay was short as they lost to Florida and TCU to end their season.

== Previous season ==
The 2022 team finished 39–19 overall, and 17–13 in ACC play, to finish in third place in the Coastal Division. As the fifth seed in the ACC tournament, they were placed in Pool D with Notre Dame and Florida State. The Cavaliers went 0–2 in pool play and were unable to advance. They received an at-large bid to the NCAA tournament and were the second seed in the Greenville Regional. They won their first game against third seed Coastal Carolina, but then lost to first seed East Carolina. In their elimination game they lost to Coastal Carolina to end their season.

== Personnel ==
=== Starters ===
Lineup
Pos.	No.	Player.	Year
C	3	Kyle Teel	Junior
1B	23	Ethan Anderson	Sophomore
2B	7	Henry Godbout	Freshman
3B	22	Jake Gelof	Junior
SS	6	Griff O'Ferrall	Sophomore
LF	21	Colin Tuft	Sophomore
CF	2	Ethan O'Donnell	Junior
RF	8	Casey Saucke	Sophomore
DH	16	Anthony Stephan	Sophomore

Weekend pitching rotation
Day	No.	Player.	Year
Friday	28	Nick Parker	Graduate
Saturday	20	Connelly Early	Junior
Sunday	36	Brian Edgington	Graduate

=== Roster ===
2023 Virginia Cavaliers baseball roster
Pitchers: 4 - Jay Woolfolk - Sophomore; 10 - Bradley Hodges - Freshman; 14 - Jack O'Connor - Freshman; 15 - Evan Blanco - Freshman; 17 - Jacob Hodorovich - Senior; 20 - Connelly Early - Junior; 27 - Avery Mabe - Junior; 28 - Nick Parker - Graduate; 29 - Johnny Ormsby - Freshman; 30 - Kevin Jaxel - Freshman; 31 - Angelo Tonas - Graduate; 32 - Jake Berry - Junior; 33 - Aidan Teel - Freshman; 35 - Cullen McKay - Freshman; 36 - Brian Edgington - Graduate; 38 - Dean Kampschror - Sophomore; 39 - Chase Hungate - Sophomore; 40 - Evan Dobias - Freshman; 45 - Luke Schauer - Junior	Catchers: 3 - Kyle Teel - Junior; 9 - Travis Reifsnider - Graduate; 21 - Colin Tuft - Sophomore; Infielders: 5 - Luke Hanson - Freshman; 6 - Griff O'Ferrall - Sophomore; 7 - Henry Godbout - Freshman; 8 - Casey Saucke - Sophomore; 12 - Justin Rubin - Sophomore; 16 - Anthony Stephan - Sophomore; 18 - Juan de la Cruz - Freshman; 22 - Jake Gelof - Junior	Outfielders: 2 - Ethan O'Donnell - Junior; 13 - Tommy Courtney - Graduate; 34 - Harrison Didawick - Freshman; 37 - Chris Baker - Graduate; Utility: 23 - Ethan Anderson - Sophomore; 25 - Matthew Buchanan - Sophomore

== Game log ==
2023 Virginia Cavaliers baseball game log
Regular season (44–11)

February (8–0)
Date	Time (ET)	TV	Opponent	Rank	Stadium	Score	Win	Loss	Save	Attendance	Overall	ACC	Sources
Hughes Bros. Challenge Presented by UNCW
February 17	2:00 p.m.	WINA	Navy*	No. 19	Davenport Field; Charlottesville, VA	W 24–5^{7}	Brian Edginton (1–0)	Nate Mitchell (0–1)	—	844	1–0	—	Box Score
February 18	2:00 p.m.		vs. Ohio*	No. 19	Bill Brooks Field; Wilmington, NC	W 8–4	Nick Parker (1–0)	Zach Weber (0–1)	—	1,378	2–0	—	Box Score
February 19	3:00 p.m.	FloSports	at UNCW*	No. 19	Bill Brooks Field	W 7–0	Jack O'Connor (1–0)	Zane Taylor (0–1)	—	1,824	3–0	—	Box Score
February 21	3:00 p.m.	ACCNX	Longwood*	No. 19	Davenport Field	W 26–2	Connelly Early (1–0)	Dylan Saale (0–1)	—	2,509	4–0	—	Box Score
February 24	3:00 p.m.	ACCNX	Columbia*	No. 19	Davenport Field	W 4–1	Nick Parker (2–0)	Andy Leon (0–1)	Jake Berry (1)	2,802	5–0	—	Box Score
February 25	1:00 p.m.	ACCNX	Columbia*	No. 19	Davenport Field	W 11–3	Brian Edginton (2–0)	JD Ogden (0–1)	—	2,812	6–0	—	Box Score
February 26	1:00 p.m.	ACCNX	Columbia*	No. 19	Davenport Field	W 9–1	Jay Woolfolk (1–0)	James Vaughn (0–1)	—	4,140	7–0	—	Box Score
February 28	6:00 p.m.	ACCNX	VMI*	No. 19	Davenport Field	W 3–0	Connelly Early (2–0)	Evan Parmer (0–1)	Jay Woolfolk (1)	2,645	8–0	—	Bos Score

March (16–2)
Date	Time (ET)	TV	Opponent	Rank	Stadium	Score	Win	Loss	Save	Attendance	Overall	ACC	Sources
March 3	3:00 p.m.	ACCNX	Rhode Island*	No. 19	Davenport Field	Canceled							
March 4 (Note: Part of a doubleheader)	12:00 p.m.	ACCNX	Rhode Island*	No. 19	Davenport Field	W 12–6	Chase Hungate (1–0)	Sean Sposato (0–2)	Bradley Hodges (1)	3,902	9–0	—	Box Score
March 4	3:30 p.m.	ACCNX	Rhode Island*	No. 19	Davenport Field	W 13–0	Brian Edginton (3–0)	Trystan Levesque (2–1)	—	3,632	10–0	—	Box Score
March 5	1:00 p.m.	ACCNX	Rhode Island*	No. 19	Davenport Field	W 16–6	Angelo Tonas (1–0)	Braden Perry (1–2)	—	3,240	11–0	—	Box Score
March 7	3:00 p.m.	ACCNX	William & Mary*	No. 17	Davenport Field	W 7–3	Connelly Early (3–0)	Owen Pierce (0–1)	—	2,850	12–0	—	Box Score
March 10	6:00 p.m.	ACCNX	at No. 14 North Carolina	No. 17	Boshamer Stadium; Chapel Hill, NC	W 7–3	Angelo Tonas (2–0)	Max Carlson (0–1)	Jake Berry (2)	1,960	13–0	1–0	Box Score
March 11	2:00 p.m.	ACCNX	at No. 14 North Carolina	No. 17	Boshamer Stadium	W 8–4	Jake Hodorovich (1–0)	Connor Bovair (1–1)	—	3,162	14–0	2–0	Box Score
March 12	1:00 p.m.	ACCNX	at No. 14 North Carolina	No. 17	Boshamer Stadium	L 0–6	Matt Poston (2–0)	Jack O'Connor (1–1)	—	3,103	14–1	2–1	Box Score
March 14	4:00 p.m.	ACCNX	George Washington*	No. 14	Davenport Field	W 20–5	Connelly Early (4–0)	Shugy Klein (0–1)	—	2,241	15–1	—	Box Score
March 16	7:00 p.m.	ACCN	at No. 23 NC State	No. 14	Doak Field; Raleigh, NC	W 2–1	Nick Parker (3–0)	Logan Whitaker (2–1)	Jake Berry (3)	2,616	16–1	3–1	Box Score
March 17	6:00 p.m.	ACCNX	at No. 23 NC State	No. 14	Doak Field	W 7–0	Brian Edginton (4–0)	Matt Willadsen (2–2)	—	2,485	17–1	4–1	Box Score
March 18	2:00 p.m.	ACCNX	at No. 23 NC State	No. 14	Doak Field	L 4–5	Baker Nelson (4–1)	Jake Berry (0–1)	—	2,936	17–2	4–2	Box Score
March 21	4:00 p.m.	ACCNX	High Point*	No. 8	Davenport Field	W 8–3	Connelly Early (5–0)	Halladay (1–2)	—	2,623	18–2	—	Box Score
March 22	4:00 p.m.	ACCNX	Georgetown*	No. 8	Davenport Field	W 6–4	Kevin Jaxel (1–0)	Kai Leckszas (1–1)	Jay Woolfolk (2)	2,628	19–2	—	Box Score
March 24	6:00 p.m.	ACCNX	Florida State	No. 8	Davenport Field	W 3–2 (10)	Jay Woolfolk (2–0)	Conner Whittaker (3–1)	—	3,066	20–2	5–2	Box Score
March 25	1:00 p.m.	ACCNX	Florida State	No. 8	Davenport Field	W 12–4	Kevin Jaxel (2–0)	Carson Montgomery (0–2)	—	4,652	21–2	6–2	Box Score
March 26	1:00 p.m.	ACCNX	Florida State	No. 8	Davenport Field	W 15–4	Jack O'Connor (2–1)	Jamie Arnold (1–3)	—	5,706	22–2	7–2	Box Score
March 28	5:00 p.m.	ACCNX	Old Dominion*	No. 5	Davenport Field	W 8–1	Connelly Early (6–0)	Robert Cook (2–1)	—	2,809	23–2	—	Box Score
Commonwealth Series
March 31	8:00 p.m.	ACCN	at Virginia Tech	No. 5	English Field; Blacksburg, VA	W 9–5	Brian Edginton (5–0)	Drue Hackenburg (1–4)	–	1,320	24–2	8–2	Box Score

April (11–9)
Date	Time (ET)	TV	Opponent	Rank	Stadium	Score	Win	Loss	Save	Attendance	Overall	ACC	Sources
Commonwealth Series
April 1	7:00 p.m.	ACCNX	at Virginia Tech	No. 5	English Field	L 10–12	Henry Weycker (3–1)	Connelly Early (6–1)	Jonah Hurney (2)	2,202	24–3	8–3	Box Score
April 2	1:00 p.m.	ACCNX	at Virginia Tech	No. 5	English Field	L 7–12	Kiernan Higgins (2–1)	Jake Berry (0–2)	–	2,068	24–4	8–4	Box Score
April 4	6:00 p.m.	CUSA.tv	at Liberty*	No. 7	Liberty Baseball Stadium; Lynchburg, VA	W 4–1	Chase Hungate (2–0)	Trey Cooper (0–2)	Jay Woolfolk (3)	3,678	25–4	—	Box Score
April 6	6:00 p.m.	ACCNX	No. 20 Miami (FL)	No. 7	Davenport Field	W 14–2	Brian Edginton (6–0)	Gage Ziehl (4–4)	–	3,033	26–4	9–4	Box Score
April 7	6:00 p.m.	ACCNX	No. 20 Miami (FL)	No. 7	Davenport Field	W 6–5	Angelo Tonas (3–0)	Rafe Schlesinger (1–1)	Jay Woolfolk (4)	4,294	27–4	10–4	Box Score
April 8	1:00 p.m.	ACCNX	No. 20 Miami (FL)	No. 7	Davenport Field	W 6–3	Jack O'Connor (3–1)	Chris Scinta (1–1)	Jake Berry (4)	3,303	28–4	11–4	Box Score
April 11	4:00 p.m.	ACCNX	Richmond*	No. 7	Davenport Field	W 18–0 (7)	Connelly Early (7–1)	Brian Reinke (0–1)	–	2,988	29–4	—	Box Score
April 12	4:00 p.m.	ACCNX	Mount St. Mary's*	No. 7	Davenport Field	W 16–4	Chase Hungate (3–0)	Danny Salisbury (1–1)	–	2,803	30–4	—	Box Score
April 14	6:00 p.m.	ACCNX	Pittsburgh	No. 7	Davenport Field	L 5–7	Jack Sokol (4–2)	Brian Edgington (6–1)	–	3,817	30–5	11–5	Box Score
April 15	4:00 p.m.	ACCNX	Pittsburgh	No. 7	Davenport Field	L 4–6	Logan Evans (2–1)	Jake Berry (0–3)	Nash Bryan (4)	5,309	30–6	11–6	Box Score
April 16	1:00 p.m.	ACCNX	Pittsburgh	No. 7	Davenport Field	W 8–5	Jack O'Connor (4–1)	Jonathan Bautista (0–3)	Jay Woolfolk (5)	4,684	31–6	12–6	Box Score
Duel at the Diamond
April 18	7:00 p.m.	ESPN+	at VCU*	No. 8	The Diamond; Richmond, VA	W 19–6	Connelly Early (8–1)	Cam Nuckols (0–1)	–	3,324	32–6	—	Box Score
April 21	6:00 p.m.	ACCNX	at Notre Dame	No. 8	Frank Eck Stadium; South Bend, IN	L 7–10	Aidan Tyrell (7–1)	Brian Edgington (6–2)	Radek Birkholz (1)	840	32–7	12–7	Box Score
April 23	12:00 p.m.	ACCNX	at Notre Dame	No. 8	Frank Eck Stadium	L 2–10	Blake Hely (2–1)	Jack O'Connor (4–2)	–	–	32–8	12–8	Box Score
April 23	3:00 p.m.	ACCNX	at Notre Dame	No. 8	Frank Eck Stadium	L 4–5	Caden Spivey (2–0)	Jake Berry (0–4)	–	703	32–9	12–9	Box Score
April 25	6:00 p.m.	ACCNX	Liberty*	No. 13	Davenport Field	W 7–4	Evan Blanco (1–0)	Tyler Germanowski (0–2)	Jay Woolfolk (6)	2,908	33–9	—	Box Score
April 26	6:00 p.m.	ACCNX	Towson*	No. 13	Davenport Field	W 13–4	Bradley Hodges (1–0)	Shayne Clowar (0–5)	–	3,071	34–9	—	Box Score
April 28	9:00 p.m.	ACCN	No. 20 Duke	No. 13	Davenport Field	L 5–17	Owen Proksch (3–1)	Brian Edgington (6–3)	–	2,730	34–10	12–10	Box Score
April 29	4:00 p.m.	ACCNX	No. 20 Duke	No. 13	Davenport Field	W 10–2	Nick Parker (4–0)	Owen Proksch (3–2)	–	4,823	35–10	13–10	Box Score
April 30	1:00 p.m.	ACCNX	No. 20 Duke	No. 13	Davenport Field	L 3–7	Andrew Healy (5–1)	Jack O'Connor (4–3)	–	3,858	35–11	13–11	Box Score

May (9–0)
Date	Time (ET)	TV	Opponent	Rank	Stadium	Score	Win	Loss	Save	Attendance	Overall	ACC	Sources
May 2	6:00 p.m.	ACCNX	VCU*	No. 21	Davenport Field	W 11–6	Bradley Hodges (2–0)	Evan Bert (2–2)	–	2,676	36–11	—	Box Score
May 3	6:00 p.m.	ACCNX	James Madison*	No. 21	Davenport Field	W 9–8	Connelly Early (9–1)	Sean Culkin (1–1)	Jay Woolfolk (7)	2,996	37–11	—	Box Score
May 10	6:00 p.m.	ACCNX	Radford*	No. 21	Davenport Field	W 8–0	Jack O'Connor (5–3)	Zack Mallia (0–3)	–	2,792	38–11	—	Box Score
May 12	6:00 p.m.	ACCNX	Louisville	No. 21	Davenport Field	W 15–5	Nick Parker (5–0)	Ryan Hawks (5–3)	–	3,741	39–11	14–11	Box Score
May 13	4:00 p.m.	ACCN	Louisville	No. 21	Davenport Field	W 4–1	Connelly Early (10–1)	Tate Kuehner (2–3)	Jake Berry (5)	3,553	40–11	15–11	Box Score
May 14	1:00 p.m.	ACCNX	Louisville	No. 21	Davenport Field	W 8–3	Brian Edgington (7–3)	Carson Liggett (7–1)	–	3,755	41–11	16–11	Box Score
May 18	6:00 p.m.	ACCNX	at Georgia Tech	No. 21	Russ Chandler Stadium; Atlanta, GA	W 12–5	Nick Parker (6–0)	Luke Schmolke (4–6)	–	1,032	42–11	17–11	Box Score
May 19	6:00 p.m.	ACCNX	at Georgia Tech	No. 21	Russ Chandler Stadium	W 10–6	Angelo Tonas (4–0)	Ben King (7–1)	Jay Woolfolk (8)	1,413	43–11	18–11	Box Score
May 20	1:00 p.m.	ACCNX	at Georgia Tech	No. 21	Russ Chandler Stadium	W 8–7	Jack O'Connor (6–3)	Camron Hill (1–1)	Jay Woolfolk (9)	1,467	44–11	19–11	Box Score

Post-season (6–4)

ACC Tournament (1–1)
Date	Time (ET)	TV	Opponent	Rank	Stadium	Score	Win	Loss	Save	Attendance	Overall	ACCT Record	Sources
May 24	3:00 p.m.	ACCN	(11) Georgia Tech	(2) No. 12	Durham Bulls Athletic Park; Durham, NC	W 15–1 (7)	Nick Parker (7–0)	Aeden Finateri (2–4)	–	2,086	45–11	1–0	Box Score
May 25	3:00 p.m.	ACCN	(7) North Carolina	(2) No. 12	Durham Bulls Athletic Park; Durham, NC	L 2–10	Jake Knapp (5–3)	Connelly Early (10–2)	Dalton Pence (1)	4,084	45–12	1–1	Box Score

NCAA tournament Charlottesville Regional (3–0)
Date	Time (ET)	TV	Opponent	Rank	Stadium	Score	Win	Loss	Save	Attendance	Overall	Regional Record	Sources
Jun 2	12:00 p.m.	ESPN+	(4) Army	(1) No. 11	Davenport Field	W 15–1	Brian Edgington (8–3)	Robbie Buecker (5–4)	–	5,487	46–12	1–0	Box Score
Jun 3	6:00 p.m.	ESPN+	(2) No. 15 East Carolina	(1) No. 11	Davenport Field	W 2–1	Nick Parker (8–0)	Danny Beal (6–2)	Jake Berry (6)	5,919	47–12	2–0	Box Score
Jun 4	6:00 p.m.	ACCN	(2) No. 15 East Carolina	(1) No. 11	Davenport Field	W 8–3	Connelly Early (11–2)	Landon Ginn (6–1)	–	5,919	48–12	3–0	Box Score

NCAA tournament Charlottesville Super Regional (2–1)
Date	Time (ET)	TV	Opponent	Rank	Stadium	Score	Win	Loss	Save	Attendance	Overall	Super Regional Record	Sources
Jun 9	12:00 p.m.	ESPN2	Duke	(7) No. 11	Davenport Field	L 4–5	Fran Oschell (6–0)	Jay Woolfolk (2–1)	James Tallon (12)	5,919	48–13	3–1	Box Score
Jun 10	12:00 p.m.	ESPN	Duke	(7) No. 11	Davenport Field	W 14–4	Connelly Early (12–2)	Alex Gow (3–4)	–	5,919	49–13	4–1	Box Score
Jun 11	12:00 p.m.	ESPN2	Duke	(7) No. 11	Davenport Field	W 12–2	Brian Edgington (9–3)	Ryan Higgins (3–1)	–	5,919	50–13	5–1	Box Score

College World Series (0–2)
Date	Time (ET)	TV	Opponent	Rank	Stadium	Score	Win	Loss	Save	Attendance	Overall	NCAAT Record	Sources
June 16	7:00 pm	ESPN	vs. (2) No. 2 Florida	(7) No. 11	Charles Schwab Field Omaha; Omaha, NE	L 5–6	Brandon Neely (1–2)	Jake Berry (0–5)	–	24,801	50–14	0–1	Box Score
June 18	2:00 pm	ESPN	vs. No. 17 TCU	(7) No. 11	Charles Schwab Field Omaha; Omaha, NE	L 3–4	Garrett Wright (3–2)	Connelly Early (12–3)	Ben Abeldt (2)	24,479	50–15	0–2	Box Score

Legend: = Win = Loss = Canceled
Bold =Virginia team member
Rankings are based on the team's current ranking in the D1Baseball poll.

== Rankings ==
Ranking movements Legend: ██ Increase in ranking ██ Decrease in ranking
	Week																		
Poll	Pre	1	2	3	4	5	6	7	8	9	10	11	12	13	14	15	16	17	Final
Coaches'	20	20*	14	11	10	7	5	7	7	7	10	12	14	13	9	9	9*	9*	6
Baseball America	19	17	15	14	9	7	5	8	8	9	11	14	14	14	9	10	10*	10*	8
Collegiate Baseball^	16	15	12	6	4	5	3	5	5	7	9	14	10	7	6	8	5	5	7
NCBWA†	19	17	11	10	9	7	5	7	6	8	11	13	16	17	12	11	5	5*	7
D1Baseball	19	19	19	17	14	8	5	7	7	8	13	21	21	21	12	11	11*	11*	6

^ Collegiate Baseball ranked 40 teams in their preseason poll, but only ranked 30 teams weekly during the season.
† NCBWA ranks 30 teams in their preseason poll, but only ranks 25 teams weekly during the season.
* A new poll was not released for this week, so for comparison purposes, the previous week's ranking is inserted in this week's slot.
