= 2023 Wake Forest Demon Deacons baseball team =

Intercollegiate baseball season

2023 Wake Forest Demon Deacons baseball

ACC Atlantic Division champions ACC regular season champions Winston-Salem Regional champions Winston-Salem Super Regional champions

College World Series, 2–2
- Conference: Atlantic Coast Conference

Ranking
- Coaches: No. 3
- CB: No. 3
- Record: 54–12 (22–7 ACC)
- Head coach: Tom Walter (14th season)
- Home stadium: David F. Couch Ballpark

2023 Atlantic Coast Conference baseball standings
	Conf.				Overall
Team	W		L	PCT	W		L	PCT
Atlantic
No. 3 Wake Forest ^{x}‍‍‍^{y}	22	–	7	.759	54	–	12	.818
No. 18 Clemson ‍‍‡‍^{y}	20	–	10	.667	44	–	19	.698
Boston College ‍‍‍^{y}	16	–	14	.533	37	–	20	.649
Notre Dame ‍‍‍	15	–	15	.500	30	–	24	.556
NC State ‍‍‍^{y}	13	–	16	.448	36	–	21	.632
Louisville ‍‍‍	10	–	20	.333	31	–	24	.564
Florida State ‍‍‍	9	–	21	.300	23	–	31	.426
Coastal
No. 6 Virginia ^{x}‍‍‍^{y}	19	–	11	.633	50	–	13	.794
No. 20 Miami (FL) ‍‍‍^{y}	18	–	12	.600	42	–	21	.667
No. 15 Duke ‍‍‍^{y}	16	–	13	.552	39	–	23	.629
North Carolina ‍‍‍^{y}	14	–	14	.500	36	–	24	.600
Virginia Tech ‍‍‍	12	–	17	.414	30	–	23	.566
Georgia Tech ‍‍‍	12	–	18	.400	30	–	27	.526
Pittsburgh ‍‍‍	10	–	18	.357	24	–	31	.436
x – Division champion ‡ – Tournament champion y – Invited to the NCAA tournament As of June 25, 2023; Rankings from D1Baseball

The 2023 Wake Forest Demon Deacons baseball team represented the Wake Forest University during the 2023 NCAA Division I baseball season. The Demon Deacons played their home games at David F. Couch Ballpark as a members of the Atlantic Coast Conference. They are led by head coach Tom Walter, in his 13th season at Wake.

== Previous season ==
The 2022 team finished the season with a 41–19–1 record and a 15–14–1 record in ACC play. They went 1–1 in the ACC tournament and earned an at-large bid to the NCAA tournament, their first since 2017. The Demon Deacons were seeded second in the College Park Regional, where they went 1–2, beating LIU, but losing to Maryland and UConn.

== Personnel ==
2023 Wake Forest Demon Deacons roster
Pitchers: 2 – William Ray – Sophomore; 4 – Rhett Lowder – Junior; 10 – Ben Shenosky – Freshman; 11 – Chase Walter – Graduate; 13 – Carson Cotugno – Sophomore; 14 – Camden Minacci – Junior; 15 – Hudson Lee – Freshman; 17 – Zach Johnston – Freshman; 19 – Crawford Wade – Junior; 20 – Derek Crum – (redshirt) Junior; 22 – Teddy McGraw – Junior; 23 – Josh Hartle – Sophomore; 26 – Seth Keener – Junior; 28 – Cole Roland – Graduate; 30 – Michael Massey - Sophomore; 35 – Will Andrews – (redshirt) Sophomore; 36 – Evan Maloney – Freshman; 40 – Reed Mascolo – (redshirt) Junior; 42 – Joe Ariola – Freshman; 51 – Sean Sullivan – Sophomore	Catchers: 16 – Gio Cueto – Sophomore; 27 – Bennett Lee – Junior; 33 – Chris Katz – Sophomore; Infielders: 3 – Danny Corona – Sophomore; 5 – Pierce Bennett – (redshirt) Junior; 6 – Justin Johnson – (redshirt) Junior; 7 – Marek Houston – Freshman; 9 – Andrew Noland – Freshman; 21 – Jack Winnay – Freshman; 25 – Brock Wilken – Junior; 28 – James Broderick – Freshman; 29 – Kyle Joye – Graduate; 31 – Parker Pilat – Sophomore; 41 – Jake Reinisch – Freshman	Outfielders: 0 – Lucas Costello – Junior; 1 – Jackson Kraemer – Freshman; 8 – Nick Kurtz – Sophomore; 12 – Adam Cecere – (redshirt) Junior; 24 – Tommy Hawke – Sophomore; 31 – Jake Reinisch – Junior

=== Coaching staff ===
Name	Position	Seasons at Wake Forest	Alma mater
Tom Walter	Head coach	14	Georgetown University (1991)
Bill Cilento	Associate Head Coach	14	Siena College (2003)
Corey Muscara	Assistant Coach	2	Franklin Pierce University (2009)

== Rankings ==
Ranking movements Legend: ██ Increase in ranking ██ Decrease in ranking ( ) = First-place votes
	Week																		
Poll	Pre	1	2	3	4	5	6	7	8	9	10	11	12	13	14	15	16	17	Final
Coaches'	10	10*	3 (2)	4 (3)	5	2 (1)	2 (2)	2 (1)	2 (1)	2 (2)	2 (1)	2 (3)	1 (27)	1 (30)	1 (29)	1 (31)	1 (31)*	1 (31)*	3
Baseball America	9	8	7	6	5	4	3	3	3	3	3	2	1	1	1	1	1*	1*	3
Collegiate Baseball^	10	6	2	2	5	6	4	4	4	3	2	2	1	1	1	1	1	1	3
NCBWA†	8	6	3	2	5	4	3	2	2	2	2	2	1	1	1	1	1	1*	3
D1Baseball	6	6	5	5 (2)	4	2	2	2	2	2	2	2	1	1	1	1	1*	1*	3

^ Collegiate Baseball ranked 40 teams in their preseason poll, but only ranked 30 teams weekly during the season.
† NCBWA ranks 30 teams in their preseason poll, but only ranks 25 teams weekly during the season.
* A new poll was not released for this week, so for comparison purposes, the previous week's ranking is inserted in this week's slot.
