= Cam Cannarella =

American baseball player (born 2003)

Miami Marlins
- Outfielder
- Born: September 6, 2003 (age 22); Lexington, South Carolina, U.S.
- Bats: Left Throws: Right
- Stats at Baseball Reference

Cameron Glover Cannarella (born September 6, 2003) is an American professional baseball outfielder in the Miami Marlins organization. He played college baseball for the Clemson Tigers.

== Amateur career ==
Cannarella attended Hartsville High School in Hartsville, South Carolina. He was the Morning News Baseball Player of the Year both his junior and senior seasons. He committed to Clemson University to play college baseball for the Clemson Tigers.

As a freshman at Clemson in 2023, Cannarella started all 59 games and hit .388/.462/.560 with seven home runs, 47 runs batted in (RBI) and 24 stolen bases over 250 at-bats. He was named a freshman All-American, All-Atlantic Coast Conference (ACC), and was the ACC Freshman of the Year.

Entering his sophomore season in 2024, Baseball America ranked Cannarella as the top prospect for the 2025 MLB draft. Cannarella played in 58 games for Clemson in 2024 and hit .337 with 11 home runs and 60 RBI. As a junior for the Tigers in 2025, he played in 61 games and batted .353 with five home runs and 52 RBI.

== Professional career ==
Cannarella was selected by the Miami Marlins in the first round with the 43rd overall selection of the 2025 Major League Baseball draft. On July 28, 2025, Cannarella signed with Miami for a $2.27 million bonus. He made his professional debut with the High-A Beloit Sky Carp and hit .284 with six RBI across 22 games.

Cannarella was assigned back to Beloit to open the 2026 season. On April 12, 2026, he was ruled out for 6-to-8 weeks after suffering a broken wrist following a collision in the outfield.
