= Patrick Hallmark =

American college baseball coach and baseball player

Current position
- Title: Head coach
- Team: UTSA
- Conference: The American
- Record: 225–131

Biographical details
- Born: December 31, 1973 (age 52); Houston, Texas, U.S.

Playing career
- 1993–1994: Alvin Community College
- 1995: Rice
- 1995: Spokane Indians
- 1996–1997: Lansing Lugnuts
- 1997–1998: Wilmington Blue Rocks
- 1999–2000: Wichita Wranglers
- 2001: Omaha Golden Spikes
- 2002: Wichita Wranglers
- 2003: Norwich Navigators
- Position: Outfielder / Catcher

Coaching career (HC unless noted)
- 2005: St. Thomas HS (TX)
- 2006–2016: Rice (asst.)
- 2017: Missouri (asst.)
- 2018–2019: Incarnate Word
- 2020–present: UTSA

Head coaching record
- Overall: 291–179
- Tournaments: NCAA: 3–2

Accomplishments and honors

Championships
- 2 AAC regular season (2025, 2026); NCAA Regional (2025)

Awards
- Southland Coach of the Year (2019); AAC Coach of the Year (2025)

James Patrick Hallmark (born December 31, 1973) is an American college baseball coach and former outfielder and catcher. He is the head baseball coach at the University of Texas at San Antonio. Hallmark played college baseball at Alvin Community College and Rice University before pursuing a professional career. Hallmark was the head coach of the Incarnate Word Cardinals baseball from 2018 to 2019.

== Amateur career ==
Hallmark attended Westbury High School in Houston, Texas. As a member of the baseball team, Hallmark was a two-time All-district selection. Upon graduation from Westbury, Hallmark enrolled at Alvin Community College. After graduating from Alvin, Hallmark accepted a baseball scholarship offer from Rice University. Hallmark helped the Owls to their first 40-win season in 11 years. Hallmark was named First Team All-Southwest Conference following the 1995 season.

== Professional career ==
The Kansas City Royals chose Hallmark with the nineteenth pick of the 18th round of the 1995 Major League Baseball draft. Hallmark began his professional career with the Spokane Indians of the Class A-Short Season Northwest League, where he batted .304 with four home runs. He was promoted to the Lansing Lugnuts of the Class A Midwest League in 1996. He hit .280 with 1 home run for Lansing.

Hallmark started 1997 with the Lugnuts. Near the end of the season, the Royals promoted Hallmark to the Wilmington Blue Rocks of the Class A-Advanced Carolina League after batting .284 with 39 RBIs in 88 games with Lansing. Hallmark returned to Wilmington for the 1998 season. He batted .272, drove in 35 runs and stole 33 bases.

Hallmark spent the 1999 and 2000 seasons with the Wichita Wranglers, having a breakout season in 2000, hitting .326 with 10 home runs, 79 RBIs and stole 41 bases. His outstanding 2000 season lead to a promotion to the Omaha Golden Spikes for the 2001 season. After just 34 games, Hallmark was injured and missed the remainder of the season. He returned to Wichita in 2002, where his production saw a decline from his past Wichita seasons. He then played the 2003 season for the Norwich Navigators in the San Francisco Giants organization, where he batted a career low, .235. He then retired from professional baseball at the conclusion of the season.

== Coaching career ==
Hallmark spent one season at St. Thomas High School in Houston. Hallmark was hired by his former coach, Wayne Graham, as an assistant at Rice. On June 28, 2011, Hallmark was promoted to a full-time assistant by Graham. When assistant Mike Taylor left the program in the fall of 2012, Hallmark assumed the duties of pitching coach.

On July 12, 2016, Hallmark was named the pitching coach for the Missouri Tigers baseball program.

On July 17, 2017, Hallmark left Missouri to become the head coach of the Incarnate Word Cardinals baseball program.

On June 16, 2019, Hallmark agreed to become the head coach of the UTSA Roadrunners baseball team.

== Head coaching record ==
Record table
Season	Team	Overall	Conference	Standing	Postseason
Incarnate Word Cardinals (Southland Conference) (2018–2019)
2018	Incarnate Word	29–26	13–17	10th	
2019	Incarnate Word	37–22	18–12	4th	Southland Tournament
Incarnate Word:		66–48	49–41		
UTSA Roadrunners (Conference USA) (2020–2023)
2020	UTSA	10–7	0–0		Season canceled due to COVID-19
2021	UTSA	22–26	14–17	3rd (West)	C-USA Tournament
2022	UTSA	38–20	19–11	T–3rd	C-USA Tournament
2023	UTSA	38–19	21–8	2nd	C-USA Tournament
UTSA:			54–36		
UTSA Roadrunners (American Athletic Conference) (2024–present)
2024	UTSA	32–24	17–10	2nd	AAC Tournament
2025	UTSA	47–15	23–4	1st	NCAA Super Regional
2026	UTSA	38–20	17–10	T–1st	AAC Tournament
UTSA:		225–131	57–24		
Total:		291–179			
National champion Postseason invitational champion Conference regular season champion Conference regular season and conference tournament champion Division regular season champion Division regular season and conference tournament champion Conference tournament champion

== See also ==
- List of current NCAA Division I baseball coaches
