= 2023 Big East Conference baseball tournament =

American college baseball tournament

- Teams: 4
- Format: Double-elimination tournament
- Finals site: Prasco Park; Mason, Ohio
- Champions: Xavier (4th title)
- Winning coach: Billy O'Connor (1st title)
- MVP: Jack Housinger (Xavier)
- Television: Big East DN; FS2 (final)

2023 Big East Conference baseball standings
	Conf.				Overall
Team	W		L	PCT	W		L	PCT
UConn ‍†‍‍	15	–	5	.750	40	–	13	.755
Xavier ‍‍‡‍^{y}	14	–	7	.667	34	–	22	.607
Seton Hall ‍‍‍	13	–	8	.619	31	–	22	.585
Georgetown ‍‍‍	10	–	10	.500	29	–	25	.537
Creighton ‍‍‍	10	–	11	.476	25	–	24	.510
St. John's ‍‍‍	8	–	12	.400	28	–	25	.528
Villanova ‍‍‍	7	–	13	.350	14	–	37	.275
Butler ‍‍‍	5	–	16	.238	12	–	43	.218
† – Conference champion ‡ – Tournament champion y – Invited to the NCAA tournament As of May 20, 2023; Rankings from D1Baseball

The 2023 Big East Conference Baseball Tournament was held at Prasco Park in Mason, Ohio from May 24 through May 27. The event, held at the end of the conference regular season, determined the champion of the Big East Conference for the 2023 season. Xavier won the tournament for the fourth time and earned the conference's automatic bid to the 2023 NCAA Division I baseball tournament.

== Format and seeding ==
The tournament uses a double-elimination format and features the top four finishers of the Big East's eight teams.

Team	W	L	Pct	GB	Seed
UConn	15	5	.750	—	1
Xavier	14	7	.667	1.5	2
Seton Hall	13	8	.619	2.5	3
Georgetown	10	10	.500	5	4
Creighton	10	11	.476	5.5	—
St. John's	8	12	.400	7	—
Villanova	7	13	.350	8	—
Butler	5	16	.238	10.5	—

== Bracket ==
First round
1	UConn	5
4	Georgetown	4
Winner's bracket
3	Seton Hall	5
2	Xavier	6
4	Georgetown	6
3	Seton Hall	3
Loser's bracket

Semi-finals
1	UConn	2
2	Xavier	10
1	UConn	10
4	Georgetown	1

Finals
2	Xavier	4	7
1	UConn	6	3

== Game results ==
Date	Game	Winner	Score	Loser	Note
May 24	Game 1	(1) UConn	5–4	(4) Georgetown	
May 24	Game 2	(2) Xavier	6–5	(3) Seton Hall	
May 25	Game 3	(4) Georgetown	6–3	(3) Seton Hall	Seton Hall eliminated
May 25	Game 4	(2) Xavier	10–2	(1) UConn	
May 26	Game 5	(1) UConn	10–1	(4) Georgetown	Georgetown eliminated
May 27	Game 6	(1) UConn	6–4	(2) Xavier	
May 27	Game 7	(2) Xavier	7–3	(1) UConn	Xavier wins Big East Tournament

== All-Tournament Team ==
The following players were named to the All-Tournament Team.

Pos	Name	School	Class
P	Garrett Coe	UConn	R-Jr.
P	Brant Alazaus	Xavier	Gr.
C	Owen Carapellotti	Georgetown	So.
INF	Pat D’Amico	Seton Hall	So.
INF	Jack Housinger	Xavier	Gr.
INF	Ben Huber	UConn	Gr.
INF	Paul Tammaro	UConn	Gr.
OF	David Smith	UConn	R-So.
OF	Carter Hendrickson	Xavier	So.
OF	Andrew Walker	Xavier	Gr.
DH	Tyler DeMartino	Xavier	Sr.

=== Jack Kaiser Award ===
Jack Housinger won the Jack Kaiser Award as Tournament Most Outstanding Player. Housinger was a graduate infielder for Xavier.
