= 2023 Florida Atlantic Owls baseball team =

American college baseball season

2023 Florida Atlantic Owls baseball
- Conference: Conference USA
- Record: 34–25 (16–14 C-USA)
- Head coach: John McCormack
- Assistant coach: Jordan Tabakman; Michael Cleary; Ricky Santiago
- Home stadium: FAU Baseball Stadium

2023 Conference USA baseball standings
	Conf.				Overall
Team	W		L	PCT	W		L	PCT
No. 25 Dallas Baptist ‍†‍‍^{y}	25	–	5	.833	44	–	13	.772
UTSA ‍‍‍	21	–	8	.724	38	–	19	.667
Charlotte ‍‍‡‍^{y}	17	–	12	.586	30	–	26	.536
Western Kentucky ‍‍‍	16	–	14	.533	32	–	25	.561
Florida Atlantic ‍‍‍	16	–	14	.533	34	–	24	.586
Louisiana Tech ‍‍‍	15	–	15	.500	28	–	30	.483
Middle Tennessee ‍‍‍	14	–	16	.467	27	–	27	.500
Rice ‍‍‍	9	–	21	.300	21	–	37	.362
FIU ‍‍‍	8	–	22	.267	21	–	34	.382
UAB ‍‍‍	8	–	22	.267	17	–	36	.321
† – Conference champion ‡ – Tournament champion y – Invited to the NCAA Tournament; As of May 21, 2023; Rankings from D1Baseball

The 2023 Florida Atlantic Owls baseball team represented Florida Atlantic University in the sport of baseball for the 2023 college baseball season. The Owls competed in Division I of the National Collegiate Athletic Association (NCAA) and in Conference USA. They played their home games at FAU Baseball Stadium, on the university's Boca Raton campus. The team was coached by John McCormack, who was in his fifteenth season at Florida Atlantic.

On October 21, 2021, Florida Atlantic accepted the invitation to join the American Athletic Conference (AAC) and will become a full member on July 1, 2023. The 2023 season was the program's last as a member of C-USA.

== Previous season ==
The 2022 Owls finished 35-23 overall, and 19-11 in the conference. They lost to Southern Miss during the 2022 Conference USA baseball tournament.

== Preseason ==
=== C-USA media poll ===
The Conference USA preseason poll was released on February 2, 2023, with the Owls predicted to finish in third place.

Media poll
Rank	School (1st Place Votes)	Total
1	LA Tech (5)	91
2	DBU (4)	90
3	Florida Atlantic	74
4	Charlotte (1)	70
5	UTSA	66
T6	Middle Tennessee	39
T6	UAB	39
8	Rice	32
9	FIU	28
10	WKU	21

=== Preseason All-CUSA teams ===
- Nolan Schanuel - Outfielder
- Hunter Cooley – Starting Pitcher

== Personnel ==
2023 Florida Atlantic Owls baseball team
Players
Coaches

#	Pos.	Name	B/T	Height	Weight	Year	Home town
1	INF	Armando Albert	L/R	5 ft 11 in (1.8 m)	150 lb (68 kg)	Jr	Plantation, Florida
2	RHP	Jacob Josey (redshirt)	R/R	6 ft 1 in (1.85 m)	185 lb (84 kg)	Jr	Ellenton, Florida
4	INF	Joey Slattery	L/R	6 ft 0 in (1.83 m)	185 lb (84 kg)	So	Charlotte, North Carolina
5	OF	Jalen DeBose	R/R	6 ft 0 in (1.83 m)	160 lb (73 kg)	Jr	Sanford, Florida
6	INF	Lucas Phelps	R/R	6 ft 1 in (1.85 m)	180 lb (82 kg)	Fr	Valrico, Florida
7	INF	Dom Presto	R/R	5 ft 11 in (1.8 m)	185 lb (84 kg)	So	Palm Beach Gardens, Florida
8	OF	Dylan Goldstein	L/R	6 ft 0 in (1.83 m)	190 lb (86 kg)	Jr	Southwest Ranches, Florida
9	OF	Spencer Rich	R/R	6 ft 2 in (1.88 m)	200 lb (91 kg)	Jr	Longmont, Colorado
10	C	John Schroeder	R/R	6 ft 1 in (1.85 m)	180 lb (82 kg)	So	Lakewood Ranch, Florida
11	INF	Patrick Ward	R/R	6 ft 3 in (1.91 m)	175 lb (79 kg)	Fr	Lakewood Ranch, Florida
12	INF	Nolan Schanuel	L/R	6 ft 3 in (1.91 m)	195 lb (88 kg)	Jr	Boynton Beach, Florida
13	RHP	C.J. Williams	R/R	5 ft 10 in (1.78 m)	180 lb (82 kg)	Jr	Deerfield Beach, Florida
14	RHP	Tyler Murphy	R/R	6 ft 1 in (1.85 m)	180 lb (82 kg)	Fr	Palm City, Florida
15	INF	Jackson Ross	R/R	6 ft 2 in (1.88 m)	200 lb (91 kg)	Sr	Lakeland, Florida
16	RHP	Robert Wegielnik (redshirt)	R/R	6 ft 0 in (1.83 m)	185 lb (84 kg)	Jr	Fort Myers, Florida
17	RHP	Sammy Beir	R/R	6 ft 1 in (1.85 m)	185 lb (84 kg)	Fr	Coral Springs, Florida
18	LHP	Hunter Cooley	R/L	6 ft 3 in (1.91 m)	210 lb (95 kg)	Gr	Vero Beach, Florida
19	INF	Christian Adams	L/R	6 ft 2 in (1.88 m)	205 lb (93 kg)	Jr	Royal Palm Beach, Florida
21	RHP	Danny Trehey	R/R	6 ft 4 in (1.93 m)	205 lb (93 kg)	Jr	Kansas City, Kansas
22	OF	Jake Millan	R/L	6 ft 2 in (1.88 m)	210 lb (95 kg)	So	Springbrook, Pennsylvania
23	RHP	Dawson Ball	L/R	6 ft 0 in (1.83 m)	195 lb (88 kg)	So	Wellington, Florida
24	OF	Mitchell Hartigan	L/R	5 ft 11 in (1.8 m)	180 lb (82 kg)	Sr	Jupiter, Florida
25	RHP	Braden Ostrander	R/R	6 ft 1 in (1.85 m)	205 lb (93 kg)	Jr	Melbourne, Florida
28	INF	Daulton Frank (redshirt)	R/R	5 ft 11 in (1.8 m)	175 lb (79 kg)	So	Loxahatchee, Florida
29	LHP	Evan Waterbor	L/L	6 ft 0 in (1.83 m)	190 lb (86 kg)	Sr	Trinity, Florida
30	C	Andrew Hernandez	R/R	5 ft 10 in (1.78 m)	200 lb (91 kg)	Gr	Miami, Florida
31	RHP	Tibur Rivero	R/R	6 ft 0 in (1.83 m)	205 lb (93 kg)	Jr	Stuart, Florida
32	LHP	Tyler Monzon	L/L	6 ft 0 in (1.83 m)	165 lb (75 kg)	So	Miami, Florida
33	RHP	Dylan Oborne	R/R	6 ft 3 in (1.91 m)	210 lb (95 kg)	Fr	Richmond Hill, Ontario, Canada
34	C	Caleb Pendleton	R/R	6 ft 2 in (1.88 m)	190 lb (86 kg)	Jr	Jensen Beach, Florida
35	RHP	Bryan Boully	R/R	6 ft 2 in (1.88 m)	205 lb (93 kg)	So	Dover, Florida
37	RHP	Brandon Smith (redshirt)	S/R	6 ft 2 in (1.88 m)	210 lb (95 kg)	Jr	Woodstock, Georgia
39	C	Phoenix Medina	R/R	6 ft 0 in (1.83 m)	180 lb (82 kg)	So	Lawton, Oklahoma
40	RHP	Sean Goodwin (redshirt)	R/R	6 ft 6 in (1.98 m)	240 lb (109 kg)	Jr	Niceville, Florida
41	LHP	Marc Degusipe (redshirt)	L/L	6 ft 1 in (1.85 m)	225 lb (102 kg)	Jr	Tampa, Florida
42	LHP	Sam Drumheller	R/L	5 ft 9 in (1.75 m)	155 lb (70 kg)	Jr	Tampa, Florida
43	LHP	Max Martzolf	L/L	6 ft 1 in (1.85 m)	250 lb (113 kg)	So	Port St. Lucie, Florida
44	RHP	Nicholas Del Prado	R/R	6 ft 2 in (1.88 m)	235 lb (107 kg)	Jr	Miami, Florida
55	RHP	Hayden Compton	R/R	6 ft 5 in (1.96 m)	210 lb (95 kg)	Jr	Centerburg, Ohio

Head coach

John McCormack (Lynn)

Assistant coach(es)

Jordan Tabakman (UConn)
Michael Cleary (Dayton)
Ricky Santiago (Lander)

Legend

- (C) Team captain
- (S) Suspended
- (I) Ineligible
- Injured
- Current redshirt

Roster
Last update: 5 February 2023

== Schedule and results ==
Legend
	Florida Atlantic win
	Florida Atlantic loss
	Postponement
**Bold**	Florida Atlantic team member

2023 Florida Atlantic Owls baseball game log
Regular season

February (7–1)
Date	Opponent	Site/stadium	Score	Win	Loss	Save	Attendance	Record
Feb. 17	Monmouth	FAU Baseball Stadium; Boca Raton, FL	**W** 6–2	**H. Cooley** (1–0)	A. Barker (0–1)	None	611	1–0
Feb. 18	Monmouth	FAU Baseball Stadium	**W** 14–8	**J. Josey** (1–0)	J. Ventresca (0–1)	None	687	2–0
Feb. 19	Monmouth	FAU Baseball Stadium	**W** 17–2	**N. Del Prado** (1-0)	J. Sisco (0–1)	None	579	3–0
Feb. 21	UCF	John Euliano Park; Orlando, FL	**W** 13–3	**E. Waterbor** (1–0)	J. Marlowe (0–1)	None	1,650	4–0
Feb. 24	South Florida	FAU Baseball Stadium	**L** 1–5	H. Mink (2–0)	**H. Cooley** (1–1)	None	638	4–1
Feb. 25	South Florida	FAU Baseball Stadium	**W** 8–7^{11}	**M. DeGusipe** (1-0)	J. Cothren (0-1)	None	646	5–1
Feb. 26	South Florida	FAU Baseball Stadium	**W** 8–6	**S. Drumheller** (1-0)	L. Gailey (0-1)	**C.J. Williams** (1)	559	6–1
Feb. 28	No. 22 Miami	FAU Baseball Stadium	**W** 6–5	**M. DeGusipe** (2-0)	R. Gallo (0-1)	**R. Wegielnik** (1)	1,180	7–1

March (9–10)
Date	Opponent	Site/stadium	Score	Win	Loss	Save	Attendance	Overall record	C-USA record
Mar. 3	No. 16 UConn	FAU Baseball Stadium	**L** 4–6	I. Cooke (1-1)	**H. Cooley** (1-2)	J. Willis (1)	659	7–2	–
Mar. 4	UConn	FAU Baseball Stadium	**L** 1–5	S. Quigley (1-0)	**J. Jacob** (1-1)	None	520	7–3	–
Mar. 5	UConn	FAU Baseball Stadium	**L** 2–8	T. Ellisen (1-0)	**N. Del Prado** (1-1)	None	543	7–4	–
Mar. 7	at No. 6 Florida	Condron Ballpark; Gainesville, FL	**L** 11–18	T. Nesbitt (1-0)	**M. Martzolf** (0-1)	None	4,737	7–5	–
Mar. 8	at No. 6 Florida	Condron Ballpark	**L** 0–11^{8}	R. Slater (3-0)	**C.J. Williams** (0-1)	P. Abner (1)	4,760	7–6	–
Mar. 10	Harvard	FAU Baseball Stadium	**W** 7–3	**H. Cooley** (2-2)	J. Driver (0-1)	None	445	8–6	–
Mar. 11	Harvard	FAU Baseball Stadium	**W** 11–3	**J. Josey** (2-1)	C. Clark (0-1)	None	491	9–6	–
Mar. 12	Harvard	FAU Baseball Stadium	**W** 9–6	**R. Wegielnik** (1-0)	C. Fang (0-1)	None	449	10–6	–
Mar. 13	Harvard	FAU Baseball Stadium	**W** 12–11^{10}	**B. Smith** (2-0)	J. Smith (0-1)	None	477	11–6	–
Mar. 15	Bradley	FAU Baseball Stadium	**W** 15–2^{7}	**M. Martzolf** (1-1)	E. Harris (0-1)	None	351	12–6	–
Mar. 17	at UTSA	Roadrunner Field; San Antonio, TX	**L** 2–8	L. Malone (2-2)	**H. Cooley** (2-3)	None	362	12–7	0–1
Mar. 19 (1)	at UTSA	Roadrunner Field	**L** 2–7^{7}	U. Quiroga (4-0)	**J. Josey** (2-2)	None	412	12–8	0–2
Mar. 19 (2)	at UTSA	Roadrunner Field	**L** 3–5^{7}	S. Miller (5–0)	**E. Waterbor** (1–1)	D. Shafer (3)	412	12–9	0–3
Mar. 22	at No. 17 Miami	Alex Rodriguez Park at Mark Light Field; Coral Gables, FL	**L** 5–10	R. Schlesinger (1-0)	**M. Martzolf** (1-2)	None	2,801	12–10	0–3
Mar. 24	Middle Tennessee	FAU Baseball Stadium	**W** 13–5	**H. Cooley** (3-3)	P. Johnson (1-1)	None	458	13–10	1–3
Mar. 25	Middle Tennessee	FAU Baseball Stadium	**W** 6–2	**J. Josey** (3-2)	J. Hamm (3-2)	**C.J. Williams** (2)	435	14–10	2–3
Mar. 26	Middle Tennessee	FAU Baseball Stadium	**W** 7–5	**N. Del Prado** (2-1)	J. Lee (2-1)	**R. Wegielnik** (2)	426	15–10	3–3
Mar. 28	UCF	FAU Baseball Stadium	**W** 4–2	**B. Smith** (3-0)	D. Castellan (0-1)	**C.J. Williams** (3)	515	16–10	3–3
Mar. 31	Rice	FAU Baseball Stadium	**L** 0–1	P. Smith (2-1)	**H. Cooley** (3-4)	M. Linskey (2)	547	16–11	3–4

April (10–8)
Date	Opponent	Site/stadium	Score	Win	Loss	Save	Attendance	Overall record	C-USA record
Apr. 1	Rice	FAU Baseball Stadium	**W** 10–7	**E. Waterbor** (2–1)	J. Marlowe (0–1)	None	410	17–11	4–4
Apr. 2	Rice	FAU Baseball Stadium	**W** 14–4^{8}	**D. Oborne** (1–0)	B. Brogdon (1-3)	None	390	18–11	5–4
Apr. 4	No. 15 Florida Gulf Coast	FAU Baseball Stadium	**W** 8–4	**R. Wegielnik** (2-0)	N. Love (2-1)	None	467	19–11	5–4
Apr. 6	at FIU	Infinity Insurance Park; Miami, FL	**W** 8–4	**N. Del Prado** (3-1)	R. Cabarcas (0-4)	None	630	20–11	6–4
Apr. 7	at FIU	Infinity Insurance Park	**W** 7–3	**J. Josey** (4-2)	O. Hernandez (1-3)	**E. Waterbor** (1)	595	21–11	7–4
Apr. 8	at FIU	Infinity Insurance Park	**L** 2–16^{7}	A. Tiburcio (3-2)	**D. Oborne** (1–1)	None	671	21–12	7–5
Apr. 11	at No. 15 Florida Gulf Coast	Swanson Stadium; Fort Myers, FL	**W** 5–4	**T. Murphy** (1-0)	W. Haberstock (4-1)	**R. Wegielnik** (3)	362	22–12	7–5
Apr. 14	Dallas Baptist	FAU Baseball Stadium	**L** 2–10	R. Johnson (4-2)	**H. Cooley** (3-5)	None	389	22–13	7–6
Apr. 15	Dallas Baptist	FAU Baseball Stadium	**L** 3–11	B. Bragg (4-1)	**J. Josey** (4-3)	None	446	22–14	7–7
Apr. 16	Dallas Baptist	FAU Baseball Stadium	**L** 2–3	Z. Russell (1-1)	**E. Waterbor** (2–2)	K. Amendt (8)	286	22–15	7–8
Apr. 19	No. 17 Miami	FAU Baseball Stadium	**W** 7–6^{11}	**N. Del Prado** (4-1)	G. Braendel (0-1)	None	779	23–15	7–8
Apr. 21	at Western Kentucky	Nick Denes Field; Bowling Green, KY	**L** 4–6	D. Mesaris (2-1)	**H. Cooley** (3-6)	CJ Weins (6)	267	23–16	7–9
Apr. 22	at Western Kentucky	Nick Denes Field	**L** 8–9^{14}	M. Burns (4-1)	**R. Wegielnik** (2-1)	None	327	23–17	7–10
Apr. 23	at Western Kentucky	Nick Denes Field	**L** 2–4	D. Hall (5-3)	**N. Del Prado** (4-2)	CJ Weins (7)	215	23–18	7–11
Apr. 25	at No. 16 Miami	Alex Rodriguez Park	**L** 9–12	R. Gallo (1-3)	**D. Oborne** (1–2)	A. Walters (6)	2,948	23–19	7–11
Apr. 28	FIU	FAU Baseball Stadium	**W** 13-3	**C.J. Williams** (1-1)	A. Tiburcio (3-5)	None	389	24–19	8–11
Apr. 29	FIU	FAU Baseball Stadium	**W** 8-4	**H. Cooley** (4-6)	D. Eckaus (0-1)	None	585	25–19	9–11
Apr. 30	FIU	FAU Baseball Stadium	**W** 10-1	**N. Del Prado** (5-2)	R. Cabarcas (1-5)	**R. Wegielnik** (4)	429	26–19	10–11

May (7-4)
Date	Opponent	Site/stadium	Score	Win	Loss	Save	Attendance	Overall record	C-USA record
May 5	at Charlotte	Robert and Mariam Hayes Stadium; Charlotte, NC	**W** 8–4	**R. Wegielnik** (3-1)	E. Michelson (1-3)	None	660	27–19	11–11
May 6	at Charlotte	Robert and Mariam Hayes Stadium	**W** 10–9	**R. Wegielnik** (4-1)	M. Langhorne (1-2)	None	718	28–19	12–11
May 7	at Charlotte	Robert and Mariam Hayes Stadium	**L** 4–12	C. Kramer (4-4)	**N. Del Prado** (5-3)	None	680	28–20	12–12
May 9	at Florida Gulf Coast	Swanson Stadium	**L** 3–11	N. Love (4-2)	**J. Josey** (4-4)	LJ McDonough (6)	218	28–21	12–12
May 12	Louisiana Tech	FAU Baseball Stadium	**W** 9-5	**C.J. Williams** (2-1)	J. Fincher (8-4)	**R. Wegielnik** (5)	428	29–21	13–12
May 13	Louisiana Tech	FAU Baseball Stadium	**L** 12–6^{16}	R. Smith (3-3)	**J. Josey** (4-5)	None	646	29–22	13–13
May 14	Louisiana Tech	FAU Baseball Stadium	**W** 12–11^{10}	**B. Ostrander** (1-0)	G. Martinez (0-5)	None	324	30–22	14–13
May 16	Florida Gulf Coast	FAU Baseball Stadium	**W** 15-5^{8}	**H. Cooley** (5-6)	M. Rippl (2-2)	None	267	31–22	14–13
May 18	at UAB	Jerry D. Young Memorial Field; Birmingham, AL	**W** 16-5	**H. Cooley** (6-6)	B. Walton (3-7)	**J. Josey** (1)	137	32–22	15–13
May 19	at UAB	Jerry D. Young Memorial Field	**W** 8–6	**S. Drumheller** (2-0)	L. Harris (1-1)	**R. Wegielnik** (6)	142	33–22	16–13
May 20	at UAB	Jerry D. Young Memorial Field	**L** 5-10	J. Smith (1-1)	**B. Smith** (1-1)	None	153	33–23	16–14

Postseason

C-USA Tournament (1-2)
Date	Opponent	Seed	Site/stadium	Score	Win	Loss	Save	TV	Attendance	Tournament record
May 24	vs. (4) Western Kentucky	5	Reckling Park; Houston, TX	**L** 9–10	M. Burns (6-2)	**R. Wegielnik** (4-2)	None	ESPN+	927	0-1
May 25	vs. (8) Rice	5	Reckling Park	**W** 6-1	**H. Cooley** (7-6)	JD McCracken (1-5)	None	ESPN+		1-1
May 24	vs. (4) Western Kentucky	5	Reckling Park	**L** 7–9	CJ Weins (1-2)	**R. Wegielnik** (4-3)	None	ESPN+	589	1-2

Legend: = Win = Loss = Cancelled
Bold = Florida Atlantic team member

Schedule source:

== Awards ==
End of Year awards
Player	Award	Date awarded	Ref.
Nolan Schanuel	Conference USA Player of the Year	May 23, 2023	
