= 2023 UConn Huskies baseball team =

American college baseball season

2023 UConn Huskies baseball

Big East Conference regular season champions

Gainesville Regional
- Conference: Big East Conference
- Record: 43–15 (15–5 Big East)
- Head coach: Jim Penders (20th season)
- Assistant coaches: Jeff Hourigan (12th season); Joshua McDonald (12th season); Chris Podeszwa (20th season)
- Home stadium: Elliot Ballpark

2023 Big East Conference baseball standings
	Conf.				Overall
Team	W		L	PCT	W		L	PCT
UConn ‍†‍‍	15	–	5	.750	40	–	13	.755
Xavier ‍‍‡‍^{y}	14	–	7	.667	34	–	22	.607
Seton Hall ‍‍‍	13	–	8	.619	31	–	22	.585
Georgetown ‍‍‍	10	–	10	.500	29	–	25	.537
Creighton ‍‍‍	10	–	11	.476	25	–	24	.510
St. John's ‍‍‍	8	–	12	.400	28	–	25	.528
Villanova ‍‍‍	7	–	13	.350	14	–	37	.275
Butler ‍‍‍	5	–	16	.238	12	–	43	.218
† – Conference champion ‡ – Tournament champion y – Invited to the NCAA tournament As of May 20, 2023; Rankings from D1Baseball

The 2023 UConn Huskies baseball team represented the University of Connecticut in the 2023 NCAA Division I baseball season. The Huskies played their home games at Elliot Ballpark on campus in Storrs, Connecticut. The team is coached by Jim Penders, in his 20th season at UConn. They played as members of the Big East Conference.

== Previous season ==
The 2022 Huskies finished with a record of 50–16, the most wins in school history, 16–5 in the Big East. They won the Big East regular season and Tournament titles and were seeded second in the NCAA College Park Regional, which they swept to advance to the Stanford Super Regional. They were defeated two games to one in their second overall Super Regional appearance by number two overall seed Stanford.

== Personnel ==
=== Roster ===
2023 Connecticut Huskies roster
Pitchers: 12 - Zach Fogell - Graduate Student; 13 - Sam Clark - Freshman; 15 - Hector Alejandro - (redshirt) Sophomore; 18 - Jack Sullivan - Sophomore; 21 - Andrew Sears - Junior; 22 - Ian Cooke - Sophomore; 24 - Michael Quigley - Junior; 25 - Thomas Ellisen - (redshirt) Freshman; 32 - Mitchell Pascarella - (redshirt) Freshman; 34 - Brady Afthim - Sophomore; 36 - Justin Willis - Graduate Student; 38 - Garrett Coe - Junior; 40 - Braden Quinn - Sophomore; 41 - Ryan Vandewater - Freshman; 42 - Stephen Quigley - Graduate Student; 43 - Maddix Dalena - Freshman; 44 - Ben Huber - Graduate Student; 45 - Curren Larson - (redshirt) Junior; 47 - Will Nowak - Graduate Student; 48 - Jude Abbadessa - Freshman; 49 - J.J. Hood - Freshman; 50 - Devin Kirby - Graduate Student; 52 - Kolby Pascarelli - Freshman; 53 - Joe Carrea - Sophomore	Catchers: 2 - Ryan Hyde - (redshirt) Sophomore; 5 - Matt Garbowski - Sophomore; 39 - Levi McAllister - Freshman; Outfielders: 3 - Zach Stephenson - Sophomore; 4 - Korey Morton - Junior; 6 - Drew Kron - Freshman; 11 - Jake Studley - Graduate Student; 26 - T.C. Simmons - (redshirt) Senior; 37 - Gavin Greger - Freshman; 46 - Niko Brini - Freshman	Infielders: 1 - Bryan Padilla - (redshirt) Sophomore; 7 - Ryan Daniels - Freshman; 8 - Noah Sorensen - Freshman; 9 - Ryan Juliano - Freshman; 10 - David Smith - (redshirt) Junior; 20 - Luke Broadhurst - Graduate Student; 23 - Paul Tammaro - Graduate Student; 27 - Jack Petersen - (redshirt) Freshman; 30 - Chris Brown - Junior; Utility: 31 - Dominic Freeberger - Graduate Student

=== Coaches ===
2023 Connecticut Huskies baseball coaching staff
- 16 – Jim Penders – Head coach – 20th season
- 29 – Jeff Hourigan – Assistant coach/recruiting coordinator – 12th season
- 33 – Joshua MacDonald – Assistant coach – 12th season
- 14 – Chris Podeszwa – Volunteer assistant coach – 20th season

== Schedule ==
Legend
	UConn win
	UConn loss
	Cancellation
**Bold**	UConn team member
*	Non-Conference game

2023 Connecticut Huskies baseball game log
Regular season

February
Date	Opponent	Rank	Site/stadium	Score	Win	Loss	Save	Attendance	Overall record	BE Record
Feb 17	vs Ohio State*		CoolToday Park • Venice, FL	**L** 0–3	Coupet (1–0)	**Cooke (0–1)**	Beidelschies (1)	3,685	0–1	
Feb 18	vs Ohio State*		Ed Smith Stadium • Sarasota, FL	**W** 9–6	**Sullivan (1–0)**	Eckhardt (0–1)	**Kirby (1)**	307	1–1	
Feb 19	vs Ohio State*		Ed Smith Stadium • Sarasota, FL	**W** 8–6	**Fogell (1–0)**	Baird (0–1)	**Willis (1)**	522	2–1	
Feb 20	vs Ohio State*		Charlotte Sports Park • Port Charlotte, FL	**L** 5–10	Jenkins (1–0)	**Quinn (0–1)**	None	176	2–2	
Feb 24	at Cal Poly*		Evans Diamond • Berkeley, CA	**W** 11–10^{10}	**Kirby (1–0)**	Sagouspe (0–1)	None	490	3–2	
Feb 25	at California*		Evans Diamond • Berkeley, CA	**L** 2–4	Sullivan (1–0)	**Sullivan (1–1)**	Stamos (1)	528	3–3	

March
Date	Opponent	Rank	Site/stadium	Score	Win	Loss	Save	Attendance	Overall record	BE Record
Mar 3	at Florida Atlantic*		FAU Baseball Stadium • Boca Raton, FL	**W** 6–4	**Cooke (1–1)**	Cooley (1–2)	**Willis (1)**	659	4–3	
Mar 4	at Florida Atlantic*		FAU Baseball Stadium • Boca Raton, FL							
Mar 5	at Florida Atlantic*		FAU Baseball Stadium • Boca Raton, FL							
Mar 7	Hartford*		Elliot Ballpark • Storrs, CT							
Mar 10	at Hawaii*		Les Murakami Stadium • Honolulu, HI							
Mar 11	at Hawaii*		Les Murakami Stadium • Honolulu, HI							
Mar 12	at Hawaii*		Les Murakami Stadium • Honolulu, HI							
Mar 13	at Hawaii*		Les Murakami Stadium • Honolulu, HI							
Mar 16	at San Diego State*		Tony Gwynn Stadium • San Diego, CA							
Mar 17	at San Diego State*		Tony Gwynn Stadium • San Diego, CA							
Mar 18	at San Diego State*		Tony Gwynn Stadium • San Diego, CA							
Mar 19	at San Diego State*		Tony Gwynn Stadium • San Diego, CA							
Mar 22	UMass*		Elliot Ballpark • Storrs, CT							
Mar 24	Rutgers*		Elliot Ballpark • Storrs, CT							
Mar 25	Rutgers*		Elliot Ballpark • Storrs, CT							
Mar 26	Rutgers*		Elliot Ballpark • Storrs, CT							
Mar 28	Boston College*		Elliot Ballpark • Storrs, CT							
Mar 31	UMBC*		Elliot Ballpark • Storrs, CT							

April
Date	Opponent	Rank	Site/stadium	Score	Win	Loss	Save	Attendance	Overall record	BE Record
Apr 1	UMBC*		Dunkin' Donuts Park • Hartford, CT							
Apr 2	UMBC*		Elliot Ballpark • Storrs, CT							
Apr 4	Columbia*		Elliot Ballpark • Storrs, CT							
Apr 6	at St. John's		Jack Kaiser Stadium • Queens, NY							
Apr 6	at St. John's		Jack Kaiser Stadium • Queens, NY							
Apr 8	at St. John's		Jack Kaiser Stadium • Queens, NY							
Apr 10	Central Connecticut*		Dunkin' Donuts Park • Hartford, CT							
Apr 11	Bryant*		Elliot Ballpark • Storrs, CT							
Apr 14	at Xavier		J. Page Hayden Field • Cincinnati, OH							
Apr 15	at Xavier		J. Page Hayden Field • Cincinnati, OH							
Apr 16	at Xavier		J. Page Hayden Field • Cincinnati, OH							
Apr 18	Northeastern*		Elliot Ballpark • Storrs, CT							
Apr 19	at Boston College*		Eddie Pellagrini Diamond • Brighton, MA							
Apr 21	Georgetown		Elliot Ballpark • Storrs, CT							
Apr 22	Georgetown		Elliot Ballpark • Storrs, CT							
Apr 23	Georgetown		Elliot Ballpark • Storrs, CT							
Apr 25	Yale*		Dunkin' Donuts Park • Hartford, CT							
Apr 26	Army*		Elliot Ballpark • Storrs, CT							
Apr 28	at Villanova		Villanova Ballpark at Plymouth • Plymouth Meeting, PA							
Apr 29	at Villanova		Villanova Ballpark at Plymouth • Plymouth Meeting, PA							
Apr 30	at Villanova		Villanova Ballpark at Plymouth • Plymouth Meeting, PA							

May
Date	Opponent	Rank	Site/stadium	Score	Win	Loss	Save	Attendance	Overall record	BE Record
May 5	Seton Hall		Elliot Ballpark • Storrs, CT							
May 6	Seton Hall		Elliot Ballpark • Storrs, CT							
May 7	Seton Hall		Elliot Ballpark • Storrs, CT							
May 9	LIU*		Elliot Ballpark • Storrs, CT							
May 10	Hofstra		Elliot Ballpark • Storrs, CT							
May 12	Butler		Elliot Ballpark • Storrs, CT							
May 13	Butler		Elliot Ballpark • Storrs, CT							
May 14	Butler		Elliot Ballpark • Storrs, CT							
May 16	at Rhode Island*		Bill Beck Field • Kingston, RI							
May 18	at Creighton		Charles Schwab Field • Omaha, NE							
May 19	at Creighton		Charles Schwab Field • Omaha, NE							
May 20	at Creighton		Charles Schwab Field • Omaha, NE							

Postseason

Big East Tournament
Date	Opponent	Rank	Site/stadium	Score	Win	Loss	Save	Attendance	Overall record	BET Record
May 25	TBD		Prasco Park • Mason, OH							
May 26	TBD		Prasco Park • Mason, OH							

Rankings from D1Baseball. Parentheses indicate tournament seedings.
