= 2023 Conference USA baseball tournament =

- Teams: 8
- Format: See below
- Finals site: Reckling Park; Houston, Texas
- Champions: Charlotte (1st title)
- Winning coach: Robert Woodard (1st title)
- MVP: Cam Fisher (Charlotte)
- Television: ESPN+, CBSSN (Championship game)

2023 Conference USA baseball standings
| | Conf. | | | | Overall |
| Team | W | | L | PCT | W | | L | PCT |
|---|---|---|---|---|---|---|---|---|
| No. 25 Dallas Baptist ‍†‍‍^{y} | 25 | – | 5 | .833 | 44 | – | 13 | .772 |
| UTSA ‍‍‍ | 21 | – | 8 | .724 | 38 | – | 19 | .667 |
| Charlotte ‍‍‡‍^{y} | 17 | – | 12 | .586 | 30 | – | 26 | .536 |
| Western Kentucky ‍‍‍ | 16 | – | 14 | .533 | 32 | – | 25 | .561 |
| Florida Atlantic ‍‍‍ | 16 | – | 14 | .533 | 34 | – | 24 | .586 |
| Louisiana Tech ‍‍‍ | 15 | – | 15 | .500 | 28 | – | 30 | .483 |
| Middle Tennessee ‍‍‍ | 14 | – | 16 | .467 | 27 | – | 27 | .500 |
| Rice ‍‍‍ | 9 | – | 21 | .300 | 21 | – | 37 | .362 |
| FIU ‍‍‍ | 8 | – | 22 | .267 | 21 | – | 34 | .382 |
| UAB ‍‍‍ | 8 | – | 22 | .267 | 17 | – | 36 | .321 |
† – Conference champion ‡ – Tournament champion y – Invited to the NCAA Tournament; As of May 21, 2023; Rankings from D1Baseball

The 2023 Conference USA Baseball Tournament was held from May 24 through May 28 at Reckling Park in Houston to determine the tournament champion of Division I Conference USA in college baseball. Charlotte, the tournament champion, received the conference's automatic bid to the 2023 NCAA Division I baseball tournament.

The tournament has been held every year since 1996, except for 2020, due to the COVID-19 pandemic. The Rice Owls has claimed seven championships, the most of any school, with the Owls latest win in 2017.

== Format and seeding ==
The tournament consisted the top eight teams in regular season play. The format consisted of two double-elimination brackets, with a single-elimination championship game.

== Bracket and results ==
First round
1 | Dallas Baptist | 13
8 | Rice | 2^{7}
4 | Western Kentucky | 10
5 | Florida Atlantic | 9
8 | Rice | 1
5 | Florida Atlantic | 6
3 | Charlotte | 8
6 | Louisiana Tech | 13
2 | UTSA | 1
7 | Middle Tennessee | 5
3 | Charlotte | 11
2 | UTSA | 2

Second round
1 | Dallas Baptist | 10
4 | Western Kentucky | 2
4 | Western Kentucky | 9
5 | Florida Atlantic | 7
6 | Louisiana Tech | 6
7 | Middle Tennessee | 7
6 | Louisiana Tech | 1
3 | Charlotte | 4

Semifinals
1 | Dallas Baptist | 5
4 | Western Kentucky | 0
7 | Middle Tennessee | 9 | 8
3 | Charlotte | 12 | 9

Finals
1 | Dallas Baptist | 2
3 | Charlotte | 5

== Schedule ==
| Game | Time* | Matchup^{#} | Score | Television | Attendance |
Wednesday, May 24
| 1 | 9:00 a.m. | No. 3 Charlotte vs. No. 6 Louisiana Tech | 8-13 | ESPN+ | |
| 2 | 12:30 p.m. | No. 2 UTSA vs. No. 7 Middle Tennessee | 1-5 | ESPN+ | 646 |
| 3 | 4:00 p.m. | No. 1 Dallas Baptist vs. No. 8 Rice | 13-2 | ESPN+ | |
| 4 | 7:30 p.m. | No. 4 Western Kentucky vs. No. 5 Florida Atlantic | 10-9 | ESPN+ | 927 |
Thursday, May 25
| 5 | 9:00 a.m. | No. 3 Charlotte vs. No. 2 UTSA | 11-2 | ESPN+ | |
| 6 | 12:30 p.m. | No. 6 Louisiana Tech vs. No. 7 Middle Tennessee | 7-6 | ESPN+ | |
| 7 | 4:00 p.m. | No. 8 Rice vs. No. 5 Florida Atlantic | 6-1 | ESPN+ | |
| 8 | 7:00 p.m. | No. 1 Dallas Baptist vs. No. 4 Western Kentucky | 10-2 | ESPN+ | |
Friday, May 26
| 9 | 2:00 p.m. | No. 3 Charlotte vs. No. 6 Louisiana Tech | 4-1 | ESPN+ | |
| 10 | 5:30 p.m. | No. 5 Florida Atlantic vs. No. 4 Western Kentucky | 7-9 | ESPN+ | 589 |
Saturday, May 27
| 11 | 9:00 a.m. | No. 7 Middle Tennessee vs. No. 3 Charlotte | 9-12 | ESPN+ | |
| 12 | 12:30 p.m. | No. 1 Dallas Baptist vs. No. 4 Western Kentucky | 5-0 | ESPN+ | 662 |
| 13 | 4:00 p.m. | No. 7 Middle Tennessee vs. No. 3 Charlotte | 8-9 | ESPN+ | |
Championship – Sunday, May 28
| Championship | 1:00 p.m. | No. 1 Dallas Baptist vs. No. 3 Charlotte | 2-5 | CBSSN | 587 |
*Game times in CDT. # – Rankings denote tournament seed.
