= 2023 UTSA Roadrunners baseball team =

College Baseball Season

2023 UTSA Roadrunners baseball
- Conference: Conference USA
- Record: 38–19 (21–8 C-USA)
- Head coach: Patrick Hallmark (4th season)
- Assistant coaches: Ryan Aguayo; Zach Butler
- Home stadium: Roadrunner Field

2023 Conference USA baseball standings
	Conf.				Overall
Team	W		L	PCT	W		L	PCT
No. 25 Dallas Baptist ‍†‍‍^{y}	25	–	5	.833	44	–	13	.772
UTSA ‍‍‍	21	–	8	.724	38	–	19	.667
Charlotte ‍‍‡‍^{y}	17	–	12	.586	30	–	26	.536
Western Kentucky ‍‍‍	16	–	14	.533	32	–	25	.561
Florida Atlantic ‍‍‍	16	–	14	.533	34	–	24	.586
Louisiana Tech ‍‍‍	15	–	15	.500	28	–	30	.483
Middle Tennessee ‍‍‍	14	–	16	.467	27	–	27	.500
Rice ‍‍‍	9	–	21	.300	21	–	37	.362
FIU ‍‍‍	8	–	22	.267	21	–	34	.382
UAB ‍‍‍	8	–	22	.267	17	–	36	.321
† – Conference champion ‡ – Tournament champion y – Invited to the NCAA Tournament; As of May 21, 2023; Rankings from D1Baseball

The 2023 UTSA Roadrunners baseball team represented the University of Texas at San Antonio in the sport of baseball for the 2023 college baseball season. The Roadrunners competed in Division I of the National Collegiate Athletic Association (NCAA) and in Conference USA. They played their home games at Roadrunner Field in San Antonio, Texas. The team was coached by Patrick Hallmark, who was in his fourth season with the Roadrunners.

The Roadrunners finished the regular season second in the conference with a record of 38-17. After being unable to win a game in the C-USA tournament, UTSA's season ended with an overall record of 38-19.

== Preseason ==
=== C-USA media poll ===
The Conference USA preseason poll was released on February 2, 2023, with the Roadrunners predicted to finish in fifth place in the conference.

Media poll
Predicted finish	Team	1st Place Votes
1	Louisiana Tech	5
2	DBU	4
3	Florida Atlantic	-
4	Charlotte	1
5	UTSA	-
T6	Middle Tennessee	-
T6	UAB	-
8	Rice	-
9	FIU	-
10	WKU	-

=== Preseason All-CUSA team ===
Preseason All-CUSA Team
Player	No.	Position	Class
Leyton Barry	8	INF	Senior
Luke Malone	34	SP	Senior
Daniel Shafer	39	RP	Junior
Simon Miller	32	RP	Junior

== Personnel ==
2023 UTSA Roadrunners baseball team
Players
Coaches

#	Pos.	Name	B/T	Height	Weight	Year	Home town
1	INF	Matt King	R/R	6 ft 0 in (1.83 m)	185 lb (84 kg)	So	Kingwood, Texas
2	OF	Isaiah Walker	R/R	6 ft 2 in (1.88 m)	185 lb (84 kg)	So	Rosharon, Texas
3	INF	Antonio Valdez	S/R	5 ft 11 in (1.8 m)	180 lb (82 kg)	Sr	Corpus Christi, Texas
4	OF	Tye Odom	R/R	5 ft 10 in (1.78 m)	170 lb (77 kg)	Fr	Bishop, Texas
5	C	Josh Killeen (redshirt)	R/R	5 ft 10 in (1.78 m)	185 lb (84 kg)	Sr	San Antonio, Texas
6	RHP	Ryan Beaird	R/R	5 ft 11 in (1.8 m)	165 lb (75 kg)	So	San Antonio, Texas
7	OF	Clark Henry	R/R	5 ft 11 in (1.8 m)	195 lb (88 kg)	Jr	Houston, Texas
8	INF	Leyton Barry	L/R	6 ft 2 in (1.88 m)	185 lb (84 kg)	Sr	Houston, Texas
9	INF	Jesse Ponce	L/R	5 ft 9 in (1.75 m)	180 lb (82 kg)	Fr	Sachse, Texas
12	LHP	Robbie Maldonado	L/L	5 ft 9 in (1.75 m)	190 lb (86 kg)	Sr	McAllen, Texas
13	RHP	Ruger Riojas	R/R	5 ft 11 in (1.8 m)	160 lb (73 kg)	Fr	Wimberley, Texas
14	RHP	Ryan Ward	R/R	6 ft 2 in (1.88 m)	190 lb (86 kg)	Jr	Schertz, Texas
15	OF	Caleb Hill	L/R	6 ft 1 in (1.85 m)	200 lb (91 kg)	Jr	Grandview, Texas
16	INF	Garrett Poston (redshirt)	L/R	6 ft 0 in (1.83 m)	195 lb (88 kg)	Jr	League City, Texas
17	RHP	Zach Royse	R/R	6 ft 2 in (1.88 m)	185 lb (84 kg)	Fr	Katy, Texas
18	LHP	Josh Salinas	L/L	5 ft 11 in (1.8 m)	190 lb (86 kg)	Jr	Corpus Christi, Texas
19	OF	Garrett Brooks (redshirt)	L/L	6 ft 0 in (1.83 m)	195 lb (88 kg)	Fr	Spring Branch, Texas
21	OF	Shane Sirdashney	R/R	6 ft 2 in (1.88 m)	200 lb (91 kg)	Sr	The Woodlands, Texas
22	RHP	Drake Smith	R/R	6 ft 1 in (1.85 m)	175 lb (79 kg)	Jr	Katy, Texas
23	RHP	Daniel Garza	R/R	5 ft 11 in (1.8 m)	190 lb (86 kg)	Jr	Houston, Texas
24	OF	Dalton Porter	L/L	5 ft 11 in (1.8 m)	195 lb (88 kg)	Jr	Round Rock, Texas
25	RHP	Braden Davis	R/R	6 ft 3 in (1.91 m)	215 lb (98 kg)	So	Austin, Texas
26	C	Nick Crespo	R/R	5 ft 10 in (1.78 m)	175 lb (79 kg)	Sr	Alpine, Texas
27	INF	Taylor Smith	R/R	6 ft 1 in (1.85 m)	225 lb (102 kg)	Sr	Georgetown, Texas
28	INF	Preston Freeman	L/R	6 ft 2 in (1.88 m)	175 lb (79 kg)	Fr	Floresville, Texas
29	OF	Aiden Baumann	R/R	5 ft 11 in (1.8 m)	180 lb (82 kg)	Fr	New Braunfels, Texas
30	RHP	John Chomko	R/R	6 ft 2 in (1.88 m)	180 lb (82 kg)	Sr	Tomball, Texas
32	RHP	Simon Miller	R/R	6 ft 2 in (1.88 m)	210 lb (95 kg)	Jr	Canton, Texas
33	OF	James Taussig	L/R	6 ft 5 in (1.96 m)	215 lb (98 kg)	So	Houston, Texas
34	RHP	Luke Malone	R/R	6 ft 3 in (1.91 m)	215 lb (98 kg)	Sr	Round Rock, Texas
35	LHP	Jay Ward	L/L	5 ft 11 in (1.8 m)	170 lb (77 kg)	Sr	Lake Villa, Illinois
36	RHP	Ulises Quiroga	R/R	6 ft 2 in (1.88 m)	195 lb (88 kg)	Jr	Baytown, Texas
39	RHP	Daniel Shafer	R/R	6 ft 3 in (1.91 m)	205 lb (93 kg)	Jr	Willis, Texas
40	RHP	Braylon Owens	R/R	6 ft 1 in (1.85 m)	240 lb (109 kg)	So	Elgin, Texas
41	LHP	Adam Wade	L/L	6 ft 7 in (2.01 m)	230 lb (104 kg)	Fr	Missouri City, Texas
42	RHP	Fischer Kingsbery	R/R	6 ft 3 in (1.91 m)	190 lb (86 kg)	Jr	Leander, Texas
44	C	Sammy Diaz	R/R	6 ft 3 in (1.91 m)	240 lb (109 kg)	Sr	Palm Desert, California

Head coach

Patrick Hallmark (Rice)

Assistant coach(es)

Ryan Aguayo (New Mexico State)
Zach Butler (McNeese State)

Legend

- (C) Team captain
- (S) Suspended
- (I) Ineligible
- Injured
- Current redshirt

Roster
Last update: May 12, 2023

== Schedule and results ==
2023 UTSA Roadrunners baseball game log
Regular season (38–17)

February (7–2)
Date	Opponent	Rank	Site/stadium	Score	Win	Loss	Save	TV	Attendance	Overall Record	C-USA Record
Feb. 17	Tarleton State		Roadrunner Field • San Antonio, TX	W 3–2	Miller (1-0)	Burcham (0-1)	-	CUSA.TV	456	1–0	
Feb. 18	Tarleton State		Roadrunner Field • San Antonio, TX	W 13–6	Garza (1-0)	Delvecchio (0-1)	-	CUSA.TV	409	2–0	
Feb. 19	Tarleton State		Roadrunner Field • San Antonio, TX	L 5–7^{12}	Enriquez (1-0)	Beaird (0-1)	-	CUSA.TV	471	2–1	
Feb. 22	Houston		Roadrunner Field • San Antonio, TX	W 12–2^{7}	Miller (2-0)	Lott (0-1)	-	CUSA.TV	619	3-1	
Feb. 24	Saint Mary's		Roadrunner Field • San Antonio, TX	L 0–1	Eaquinto (1-0)	Malone (0-1)	Damozonio (1)	CUSA.TV	434	3–2	
Feb. 25	Saint Mary's		Roadrunner Field • San Antonio, TX	W 11–8	Riojas (1-0)	Lamb (1-1)	Miller (1)	CUSA.TV	395	4–2	
Feb. 25	Saint Mary's		Roadrunner Field • San Antonio, TX	W 9-4^{7}	Quiroga (1-0)	Spalliero (0-1)	-	CUSA.TV	395	5–2	
Feb. 26	Saint Mary's		Roadrunner Field • San Antonio, TX	W 4–2	Garza (2-0)	Wiltse (0-2)	-	CUSA.TV	312	6–2	
Feb. 28	at Baylor		Baylor Ballpark • Waco, TX	W 8–3	Smith (1-0)	Rogers (0-1)	Shafer (1)	ESPN+	1785	7–2	

March (14–4)
Date	Opponent	Rank	Site/stadium	Score	Win	Loss	Save	TV	Attendance	Overall Record	C-USA Record
Mar. 1	Incarnate Word		Roadrunner Field • San Antonio, TX	W 2-1	Miller (3-0)	Rodriguez (0-1)	-	CUSA.TV	391	8–2	
Mar. 3	Utah		Roadrunner Field • San Antonio, TX	L 3–5	Day (2-1)	Malone (0-2)	Ashman (2)	CUSA.TV	487	8–3	
Mar. 4	Utah		Roadrunner Field • San Antonio, TX	W 11–5	Quiroga (2-0)	Hostert (2-0)	-	CUSA.TV	476	9–3	
Mar. 5	Utah		Roadrunner Field • San Antonio, TX	W 14–3	Garza (3-0)	Jones (0-1)	-	CUSA.TV	447	10–3	
Mar. 7	at Texas State		Bobcat Ballpark • San Marcos, TX	W 11–2	Miller (4-0)	Smith (0-1)	-	ESPN+	2028	11–3	
Mar. 10	Texas A&M - Corpus Christi		Roadrunner Field • San Antonio, TX	W 10–6	Malone (1-2)	Thomas (2-2)	Shafer (2)	CUSA.TV	564	12–3	
Mar. 11	Texas A&M - Corpus Christi		Roadrunner Field • San Antonio, TX	W 31–6	Quiroga (3-0)	Garcia (1-2)	-	CUSA.TV	537	13–3	
Mar. 12	Texas A&M - Corpus Christi		Roadrunner Field • San Antonio, TX	W 9–6	Riojas (2-0)	Feltz (0-1)	Miller (2)	CUSA.TV	562	14–3	
Mar. 14	at Stephen F. Austin		Jaycees Field • Nacogdoches, TX	W 9–3	Beaird (1-1)	Gonzalez (0-1)	-			15–3	
Mar. 17	Florida Atlantic		Roadrunner Field • San Antonio, TX	W 8–2	Malone (2-2)	Cooley (2-3)	-	CUSA.TV	362	16–3	1–0
Mar. 19	Florida Atlantic		Roadrunner Field • San Antonio, TX	W 7–2^{7}	Quiroga (4-0)	Josey (2-2)	-	CUSA.TV	412	17–3	2–0
Mar. 19	Florida Atlantic		Roadrunner Field • San Antonio, TX	W 5–3^{7}	Miller (5-0)	Waterbor (1-1)	Shafer (3)	CUSA.TV	412	18–3	3-0
Mar. 21	at UT Rio Grande Valley		UTRGV Baseball St • Edinburg, TX	L 3–5	Ariza (1-2)	Smith (1-1)	Mejia (1)	ESPN+	1902	18–4	
Mar. 24	at Rice		Reckling Park • Houston, TX	W 4–3^{11}	Miller (6-0)	Ben-Shoshan (2-1)	Shafer (4)	CUSA.TV	2043	19–4	4–0
Mar. 25	at Rice		Reckling Park • Houston, TX	L 8–13	McCracken (1-1)	Garza (3-1)	Raj (4)	CUSA.TV	2814	19–5	4–1
Mar. 26	at Rice		Reckling Park • Houston, TX	W 6–5	Kingsberry (1-0)	Brogdon (1-2)	Shafer (5)	CUSA.TV	2634	20–5	5-1
Mar. 28	at Texas A&M - Corpus Christi		Chapman Field • Corpus Christi, TX	L 2–8	Watson (2-2)	Ward (0-1)	-	ESPN+	379	20–6	
Mar. 31	Western Kentucky		Roadrunner Field • San Antonio, TX	W 3–2	Malone (3-2)	Diuguid (0-1)	Miller (3)	CUSA.TV	481	21-6	6-1

April (12–5)
Date	Opponent	Rank	Site/stadium	Score	Win	Loss	Save	TV	Attendance	Overall Record	C-USA Record
Apr. 1	Western Kentucky		Roadrunner Field • San Antonio, TX	W 5–4	Riojas (3-0)	Hall (4-2)	Miller (4)	CUSA.TV	494	22–6	7–1
Apr. 2	Western Kentucky		Roadrunner Field • San Antonio, TX	W 7–2	Garza (4-1)	Terbrak (3-2)	-	CUSA.TV	414	23–6	8–1
Apr. 3	at Incarnate Word		Sullivan Field • San Antonio, TX	L 6–9	Hayward (4-2)	Shafer (0-1)	-	ESPN+	276	23–7	
Apr. 6	at Charlotte		Hayes Stadium • Charlotte, NC	W 5-3	Malone (4-2)	Hudepohl (2-4)	Miller (5)	ESPN+	581	24–7	9-1
Apr. 6	at Charlotte		Hayes Stadium • Charlotte, NC	L 10–12	Thompson (3-1)	Quiroga (4-1)	-	ESPN+	581	24–8	9–2
Apr. 8	at Charlotte		Hayes Stadium • Charlotte, NC	Game canceled							
Apr. 11	at Texas A&M		Blue Bell Park • College Station, TX	W 5–1	Quiroga (5-1)	Wansing (2-2)	-	ESPN+	4613	25–8	
Apr. 14	Middle Tennessee		Roadrunner Field • San Antonio, TX	W 13–5	Malone (5-2)	Johnson (2-2)	-	CUSA.TV	687	26–7	10-2
Apr. 15	Middle Tennessee		Roadrunner Field • San Antonio, TX	W 12–4	Miller (7-0)	Hamm (4-3)	-	CUSA.TV	487	27–7	11–2
Apr. 16	Middle Tennessee		Roadrunner Field • San Antonio, TX	W 5–4	Quiroga (6-1)	Swan (1-5)	Miller (6)	CUSA.TV	394	28–7	12–2
Apr. 18	Texas State	25	Roadrunner Field • San Antonio, TX	L 3–5	Zabel (1-1)	Owens (0-1)	Bush (1)	CUSA.TV	1059	28–9	
Apr. 21	at FIU	25	Infinity Insurance Park • Miami, FL	W 22–8	Malone (6-2)	Tiburcio (3-4)	-		543	29–9	13-2
Apr. 22	at FIU	25	Infinity Insurance Park • Miami, FL	W 9–8	Riojas (4-0)	Mcauliff (0-2)	Miller (7)		521	30–9	14–2
Apr. 23	at FIU	25	Infinity Insurance Park • Miami, FL	L 1–6	Cabarcas (1-4)	Quiroga (6-2)	Pazos (1)		510	30–10	14–3
Apr. 25	Houston Christian	25	Roadrunner Field • San Antonio, TX	W 9–8	Beaird (2-1)	Smiterman (1-2)	-	CUSA.TV	446	31–10	
Apr. 28	at UAB	25	Young Memorial Field • Birmingham, AL	L 2–4	Walton (3-4)	Malone (6-3)	-	CUSA.TV	241	31–11	14-4
Apr. 29	at UAB	25	Young Memorial Field • Birmingham, AL	W 6–5	Beaird (3-1)	Marlin (0-3)	Miller (8)	CUSA.TV	255	32–11	15–4
Apr. 30	at UAB	25	Young Memorial Field • Birmingham, AL	W 9–4	Quiroga (7-2)	Myers (1-5)	Miller (9)	ESPN+	312	33–11	16–4

May (5–6)
Date	Opponent	Rank	Site/stadium	Score	Win	Loss	Save	TV	Attendance	Overall Record	C-USA Record
May 2	Sam Houston	22	Roadrunner Field • San Antonio, TX	L 2–18	Wales (2-4)	Owens (0-2)	-	CUSA.TV	575	33–12	
May 5	Rice	22	Roadrunner Field • San Antonio, TX	W 9–7	Beaird (4-1)	Cienfuegos (2-1)	Miller (10)	CUSA.TV	616	34–12	17-4
May 6	Rice	22	Roadrunner Field • San Antonio, TX	W 10–8	Garza (5-1)	Hamilton (1-3)	Miller (11)	CUSA.TV	605	35–12	18–4
May 7	Rice	22	Roadrunner Field • San Antonio, TX	W 11–6	Riojas (5-0)	Cienfuegos (2-2)	-	CUSA.TV	649	36–12	19–4
May 12	No. 18 Dallas Baptist	22	Roadrunner Field • San Antonio, TX	L 7–11	Johnson (7-2)	Malone (6-4)	-	CUSA.TV	935	36–13	19–5
May 12	No. 18 Dallas Baptist	22	Roadrunner Field • San Antonio, TX	L 9–11	Amendt (1-1)	Miller (7-1)	-	CUSA.TV	935	36-14	19-6
May 14	No. 18 Dallas Baptist	22	Roadrunner Field • San Antonio, TX	L 6–9	Baker (4-0)	Fischer (1-1)	Amendt (12)	CUSA.TV	487	36-15	19-7
May 16	at Abilene Christian		Crutcher Scott Field • Abilene, TX	L 8–10	Stephenson (4-2)	Royse (0-1)	Smith (8)	ESPN+	316	36-16	
May 18	at Louisiana Tech		J.C. Love Field • Ruston, LA	W 18–16^{11}	Miller (8-1)	Bates (4-3)	-	CUSA.TV	1921	37-16	20-7
May 19	at Louisiana Tech		J.C. Love Field • Ruston, LA	W 5–3	Ward (1-1)	Smith (3-4)	Smith (1)	CUSA.TV	1995	38-16	21-7
May 20	at Louisiana Tech		J.C. Love Field • Ruston, LA	L 5–7	Tomkins (6-1)	Beaird (4-2)	Bates (10)	CUSA.TV	1949	38-17	21-8

Postseason (0–2)

C-USA Tournament (0–2)
Date	Opponent	Seed	Site/stadium	Score	Win	Loss	Save	TV	Attendance	Overall record	Tournament record
May 24	No. 7 Middle Tennessee	2	Reckling Park • Houston, TX	L 1–5	Swan (2-6)	Ward (1-2)	-	ESPN+	646	38-18	0-1
May 25	No 3. Charlotte	2	Reckling Park • Houston, TX	L 2–11	Thompson (6-2)	Smith (1-2)		ESPN+	570	38-19	0-2

Legend: = Win = Loss = Cancelled/Postponed

Schedule Source:

*Rankings are based on the team's current ranking in the D1Baseball poll.

== Postseason ==
=== Conference USA tournament ===
First round
3	Charlotte	8
6	Louisiana Tech	13
2	UTSA	1
7	Middle Tennessee	5
3	Charlotte	11
2	UTSA	2
1	Dallas Baptist	13^{7}
8	Rice	2
4	Western Kentucky	10
5	Florida Atlantic	9
8	Rice	1
5	Florida Atlantic	6

Second round
6	Louisiana Tech	6
7	Middle Tennessee	7
6	Louisiana Tech	1
3	Charlotte	4
1	Dallas Baptist	10
4	Western Kentucky	2
4	Western Kentucky	9
5	Florida Atlantic	7

Semifinals
7	Middle Tennessee	9	8
3	Charlotte	12	9
1	Dallas Baptist	5	-
4	Western Kentucky	0	-

Finals
3	Charlotte	5
1	Dallas Baptist	2

== Awards and honors ==
Conference honors
Honors	Player	Position	Ref.
Conference USA Pitcher of the Year	Simon Miller, Jr.	P	
All-Conference USA First Team	Antonio Valdez	INF	
All-Conference USA First Team	Simon Miller, Jr.	P	
All-Conference USA Second Team	Josh Killeen, Sr.	C	
All-Conference USA Second Team	Leyton Barry, Sr.	INF	
All-Conference USA Second Team	Caleb Hill, Jr.	OF	
All-Conference USA Second Team	Luke Malone, Sr.	SP	
All-Conference USA Second Team	Sammy Diaz, Sr.	UTIL	
All-Conference USA Freshman Team	Ruger Riojas	P	

== Rankings ==
Ranking movements Legend: ██ Increase in ranking ██ Decrease in ranking — = Not ranked RV = Received votes
	Week																		
Poll	Pre	1	2	3	4	5	6	7	8	9	10	11	12	13	14	15	16	17	Final
Coaches'	—	—*	—	—	—	RV	RV	RV	RV	RV	RV	RV	24	RV	RV	RV			
Baseball America	—	—	—	—	—	—	—	24	—	22	23	22	23	—	—	—			
Collegiate Baseball^	—	—	—	—	—	—	—	—	—	25	—	—	—	—	—	—			
NCBWA†	—	—	—	RV	RV	RV	RV	27	RV	28	28	25	22	30	RV	RV			
D1Baseball	—	—	—	—	—	—	—	—	—	25	25	22	22	—	—	—			

^ Collegiate Baseball ranked 40 teams in their preseason poll, but only ranked 30 teams weekly during the season.
† NCBWA ranks 30 teams in their preseason poll, but only ranks 25 teams weekly during the season.
* A new poll was not released for this week, so for comparison purposes, the previous week's ranking is inserted in this week's slot.
