= 2023 NCAA Division I baseball rankings =

2023 NCAA Division I baseball season
- Duration: February 17, 2023 – June 26, 2023
- Number of teams: 300
- Preseason No. 1: LSU

Tournament
- Duration: June 16–26, 2023
- Most conference bids: SEC (10)

College World Series
- Champions: LSU
- Runners-up: Florida
- MOP: Paul Skenes

Seasons
- ← 2022 2024 →

The following human polls make up the 2023 NCAA Division I men's baseball rankings. The USA Today/ESPN Coaches Poll is voted on by a panel of 31 Division I baseball coaches. The Baseball America poll is voted on by staff members of the Baseball America magazine. These polls, along with the Perfect Game USA poll, rank the top 25 teams nationally. Collegiate Baseball and the National Collegiate Baseball Writers Association rank the top 30 teams nationally.

== Legend ==
	Increase in ranking
	Decrease in ranking
	Not ranked previous week
Italics	Number of first place votes
(#-#)	Win-loss record
т	Tied with team above or below also with this symbol

== ESPN/USA Today Coaches Poll ==
	Preseason Feb 2	Week 2 Feb 27	Week 3 Mar 6	Week 4 Mar 13	Week 5 Mar 20	Week 6 Mar 27	Week 7 Apr 3	Week 8 Apr 10	Week 9 Apr 17	Week 10 Apr 24	Week 11 May 1	Week 12 May 8	Week 13 May 15	Week 14 May 22	Week 15 May 29	Final Jun 27	
1.	LSU (23)	LSU (6–1) (24)	LSU (10–1) (26)	LSU (15–1) (27)	LSU (18–2) (29)	LSU (21–3) (28)	LSU (24–4) (29)	LSU (26–5) (25)	LSU (29–6) (28)	LSU (32–7) (27)	LSU (35–8) (27)	Wake Forest (39–7) (27)	Wake Forest (42–8) (30)	Wake Forest (45–9) (29)	Wake Forest (47–10) (31)	LSU (53–17) (31)	1.
2.	Tennessee (6)	Tennessee (6–2) (2)	Tennessee (11–2)	Tennessee (14–3)	Wake Forest (18–3) (1)	Wake Forest (22–3) (2)	Wake Forest (26–3) (1)	Wake Forest (28–4) (1)	Wake Forest (31–5) (2)	Wake Forest (34–6) (1)	Wake Forest (37–6) (3)	LSU (37–10) (4)	Florida (40–12) (1)т	Florida (42–13) (1)	Florida (44–14)	Florida (54–16)	2.
3.	Stanford	Wake Forest (9–0) (2)	Stanford (9–2) (1)	Ole Miss (14–2) (1)	Florida (18–4)т	Florida (22–4)	Florida (24–5)	Florida (27–6) (2)	Florida (30–7) (1)	South Carolina (34–6) (3)	Florida (35–10)	Arkansas (36–12)	Arkansas (38–13)т	LSU (42–13)	Arkansas (41–16)	Wake Forest (54–12)	3.
4.	Texas A&M	Stanford (5–2) (1)	Wake Forest (13–0) (3)	Florida (15–3)	Arkansas (18–2)т	Vanderbilt (19–5)	Vanderbilt (23–5)	Vanderbilt (26–6)	Vanderbilt (29–7)	Florida (31–10)	South Carolina (35–8) (1)	Vanderbilt (34–13)	LSU (39–12)	Arkansas (39–15)	Vanderbilt (41–18)	Tennessee (44–22)	4.
5.	Florida	Ole Miss (6–1) (2)	Ole Miss (10–2) (1)	Wake Forest (15–2) (2)	Vanderbilt (16–5)	Virginia (22–2)	Arkansas (23–5)	South Carolina (28–4) (1)	Arkansas (29–7)	Vanderbilt (29–11)	Vanderbilt (32–11)	Florida (37–12)	Stanford (34–14)	Stanford (37–14)	Clemson (43–17)	Stanford (44–20)	5.
6.	Arkansas	Florida (7–1)	Florida (10–3)	Arkansas (13–2)	Louisville (17–2)	Arkansas (20–4)	South Carolina (26–3)	Arkansas (25–6)	South Carolina (30–6)	Arkansas (30–10)	Arkansas (33–11)	Stanford (31–13)	Vanderbilt (35–16)	Vanderbilt (37–17)	Standford (38–16)т	Virginia (50–15)	6.
7.	Ole Miss (2)	Vanderbilt (5–3)	Louisville (10–1)	Louisville (14–1)	Virginia (17–2)	Stanford (15–5)	Virginia (24–4)	Virginia (28–4) (1)	Virginia (31–6)	Coastal Carolina (26–12)	Stanford (28–13)	South Carolina (36–11)	West Virginia (39–13)	Coastal Carolina (37–17)	LSU (43–15)т	TCU (44–24)	7.
8.	Oklahoma State	Arkansas (5–2)	Arkansas (9–2)	Vanderbilt (12–5)	UCLA (15–3)	South Carolina (23–2) (1)	Tennessee (21–8)	Stanford (21–7)	East Carolina (28–8)	Stanford (25–12)	Coastal Carolina (28–14)	Duke (32–13)	Coastal Carolina (33–17)	Clemson (39–17)	Coastal Carolina (39–19)	Oral Roberts (52–14)	8.
9.	Vanderbilt	East Carolina (5–1)	Vanderbilt (8–4)	Stanford (10–5)	Stanford (13–5)	Tennessee (19–6)	Stanford (18–7)	Louisville (24–7)	Stanford (23–10)	Campbell (31–8)	UConn (32–11)	Coastal Carolina (30–16)	South Carolina (37–14)	Virginia (44–11)	Virginia (45–12)	Southern Miss (46–20)	9.
10.	Wake Forest	Louisville (6–1)	Virginia Tech (9–2)	Virginia (14–1)	East Carolina (16–4)	East Carolina (19–5)	Kentucky (25–3)	East Carolina (24–8)	Louisville (26–9)	Virginia (32–9)	Duke (31–13)	UConn (35–11)	Clemson (35–17)	UConn (40–13)	Miami (FL) (40–19)	South Carolina (42–21)	10.
11.	Louisville	Virginia Tech (5–2)	Virginia (11–0)	East Carolina (12–3)	South Carolina (20–1) (1)	Louisville (19–4)	Boston College (20–6)	Kentucky (27–5)	Kentucky (28–7)	Kentucky (30–9)	Miami (FL) (28–16)	West Virginia (36–12)т	UConn (38–12)	Miami (FL) (37–18)	Campbell (44–13)	Arkansas (43–18)	11.
12.	North Carolina	UCLA (5–2)	UCLA (9–2)	UCLA (12–3)	Tennessee (15–6)	UCLA (16–5)	Louisville (21–6)	Tennessee (22–10)	Campbell (27–8)	Boston College (27–12)	Virginia (35–11)	Campbell (36–10)т	Miami (FL) (34–17)	East Carolina (41–15)	East Carolina (45–17)	Texas (42–22)	12.
13.	East Carolina	Oklahoma State (4–3)	East Carolina (7–3)	Oklahoma State (14–3)	Ole Miss (14–6)	Oklahoma State (20–5)	Oklahoma State (22–7)	North Carolina (22–10)	Coastal Carolina (23–11)	UConn (29–11)	Campbell (31–10)	Miami (FL) (31–16)	Virginia (41–11)	Tennessee (38–18)	Oklahoma State (41–18)	Kentucky (40–21)	13.
14.	Maryland	Virginia (7–0)	Oklahoma State (8–3)	South Carolina (16–1) (1)	Texas Tech (18–4)	North Carolina (18–6)	Campbell (22–4)	Boston College (21–9)	Texas (26–12)	East Carolina (29–11)	West Virginia (33–11)	Virginia (37–11)	Campbell (39–11)	Oregon State (39–16)	UConn (43–15)	Indiana State (45–17)	14.
15.	UCLA	Florida State (6–1)	NC State (12–0)	Texas A&M (12–4)	Oklahoma State (16–5)	Campbell (19–3)	North Carolina (20–8)	Campbell (24–6)	UConn (26–9)	Texas Tech (29–13)	East Carolina (31–13)	East Carolina (34–14)	East Carolina (38–14)	Campbell (41–13)	Dallas Baptist (45–14)	Vanderbilt (42–20)	15.
16.	Virginia Tech	Texas Tech (8–0)	TCU (7–4)	Virginia Tech (12–4)	North Carolina (15–5)	Boston College (17–5)	East Carolina (20–8)	Oklahoma State (23–10)	North Carolina (24–12)	Tennessee (26–14)	Tennessee (30–14)	Kentucky (33–13)	Duke (34–16)	Dallas Baptist (42–13)	Tennessee (38–19)	Duke (39–24)	16.
17.	TCU	TCU (4–3)	North Carolina (9–3)	NC State (14–2)	Boston College (14–3)	Kentucky (21–3)	Florida Gulf Coast (23–5)	Florida Gulf Coast (26–6)	Boston College (24–11)	Miami (FL) (25–15)	Boston College (29–14)	Boston College (30–16)	Dallas Baptist (40–12)	West Virginia (39–16)	Oregon State (39–18)	Alabama (43–21)	17.
18.	Miami (FL)	Texas A&M (4–3)	Alabama (12–0)	TCU (9–6)	Texas A&M (14–6)	Florida Gulf Coast (21–4)	UConn (20–6)	Texas (23–10)	Miami (FL) (22–13)	Arizona State (27–12)	Dallas Baptist (34–10)	Oregon State (33–14)т	Oregon State (36–15)	Oklahoma State (37–16)	South Carolina (39–19)	Clemson (44–19)	18.
19.	Southern Miss	Miami (FL) (7–1)	Texas A&M (7–4)	Texas Tech (14–3)	Campbell (15–3)	Texas (18–7)	Texas (20–9)	UCLA (19–8)	Texas Tech (25–12)	Louisville (26–13)	Oregon (30–13)	Dallas Baptist (36–12)т	Tennessee (35–17)	South Carolina (38–17)	Southern Miss (41–17)	Oregon (41–22)	19.
20.	Virginia	NC State (7–0)	South Carolina (11–1)	North Carolina (12–5)	Miami (FL) (14–6)	UConn (16–5)	Miami (FL) (19–9)	UConn (22–8)	Tennessee (23–13)	Dallas Baptist (31–9)	Oregon State (30–13)	Tennessee (32–16)	Kentucky (35–15)	Boston College (34–17)	Indiana State (42–15)	Coastal Carolina (42–21)	20.
21.	Texas Tech	North Carolina (4–3)	Texas Tech (11–2)	Florida State (11–4)	Missouri (16–3)	Texas Tech (18–7)	Coastal Carolina (18–7)	Coastal Carolina (20–9)	Arizona State (25–10)	West Virginia (29–11)	Kentucky (30–13)	Clemson (31–17)	Boston College (32–16)	Kentucky (36–17)	Kentucky (36–18)	Miami (FL) (42–21)	21.
22.	NC State	Alabama (8–0)	Oregon State (9–2)	Alabama (15–2)	Kentucky (18–2)	Iowa (19–3)	UCLA (16–8)	Texas Tech (22–10)	UCLA (21–10)	Duke (27–12)	Arizona State (29–15)	Oklahoma State (33–14)	Oklahoma State (35–15)	Texas (38–18)	West Virginia (39–18)	Campbell (46–15)	22.
23.	Oregon State	South Carolina (8–0)	Florida State (8–3)	Campbell (12–2)	Florida Gulf Coast (16–4)	Miami (FL) (15–9)	Texas Tech (20–9)	Arizona State (23–9)	Oregon (24–10)	Oregon (26–12)	Oklahoma State (30–13)	Maryland (33–16)	Maryland (35–18)	Southern Miss (37–16)	Alabama (40–19)	East Carolina (47–19)	23.
24.	Texas	Oregon State (6–1)	Southern Miss (8–3)	Boston College (12–2)	NC State (15–5)	UC Santa Barbara (16–4)	West Virginia (21–7)	USC (20–10)	Oklahoma State (24–13)	Oklahoma State (28–13)	Texas Tech (30–15)	UTSA (36–12)	Southern Miss (35–15)	Duke (35–19)	Boston College (35–18)	Dallas Baptist (47–16)	24.
25.	Oregon	Maryland (3–4)	Auburn (9–1)	Southern Miss (10–5)	Alabama (17–4)	Ole Miss (15–9)	NC State (20–8)	Miami (FL) (20–12)	Oregon State (24–11)	Indiana (30–11)	Louisville (28–15)	Texas Tech (32–16)т Indiana State (32–13)т	Indiana State (35–14)	Auburn (33–19–1)	Maryland (41–19)	Oregon State (41–20)	25.
	Preseason Feb 2	Week 2 Feb 27	Week 3 Mar 6	Week 4 Mar 13	Week 5 Mar 20	Week 6 Mar 27	Week 7 Apr 3	Week 8 Apr 10	Week 9 Apr 17	Week 10 Apr 24	Week 11 May 1	Week 12 May 8	Week 13 May 15	Week 14 May 22	Week 15 May 29	Final Jun 27	
		Dropped: No. 19 Southern Miss; No. 24 Texas; No. 25 Oregon	Dropped: No. 19 Miami (FL); No. 25 Maryland	Dropped: No. 22 Oregon State; No. 25 Auburn	Dropped: No. 16 Virginia Tech; No. 18 TCU; No. 21 Florida State; No. 25 Southern Miss	Dropped: No. 18 Texas A&M; No. 21 Missouri; No. 24 NC State; No. 25 Alabama	Dropped: No. 22 Iowa; No. 24 UC Santa Barbara; No. 25 Ole Miss	Dropped: No. 24 West Virginia; No. 25 NC State	Dropped: No. 17 Florida Gulf Coast; No. 24 USC	Dropped: No. 14 Texas; No. 16 North Carolina; No. 22 UCLA; No. 25 Oregon State	Dropped: No. 25 Indiana	Dropped: No. 19 Oregon; No. 22 Arizona State; No. 25 Louisville	Dropped: No. 24 USTA; No. 25т Texas Tech	Dropped: No. 23 Maryland; No. 25 Indiana State	Dropped: No. 22 Texas; No. 24 Duke; No. 25 Auburn	Dropped: No. 13 Oklahoma State; No. 14 UConn; No. 22 West Virginia; No. 24 Boston College; No. 25 Maryland	

== Baseball America ==
	Preseason Jan 23	Week 1 Feb 20	Week 2 Feb 27	Week 3 Mar 6	Week 4 Mar 13	Week 5 Mar 20	Week 6 Mar 27	Week 7 Apr 3	Week 8 Apr 10	Week 9 Apr 17	Week 10 Apr 24	Week 11 May 1	Week 12 May 8	Week 13 May 15	Week 14 May 22	Week 15 May 29	Final Jun 27	
1.	LSU	LSU (3–0)	LSU (6–1)	LSU (10–1)	LSU (15–1)	LSU (18–2)	LSU (21–3)	LSU (24–4)	LSU (26–5)	LSU (29–6)	LSU (32–7)	LSU (35–8)	Wake Forest (39–7)	Wake Forest (42–8)	Wake Forest (45–9)	Wake Forest (47–10)	LSU (54–17)	1.
2.	Tennessee	Florida (3–0)	Florida (7–1)	Florida (10–3)	Florida (15–3)	Florida (18–4)	Florida (22–4)	Florida (24–5)	Florida (27–6)	Florida (30–7)	South Carolina (34–6)	Wake Forest (37–6)	LSU (37–10)	Arkansas (38–13)	Florida (42–13)	Florida (44–14)	Florida (54–17)	2.
3.	Florida	Stanford (2–1)	Stanford (5–2)	Stanford (9–2)	Louisville (14–1)	Louisville (17–2)	Wake Forest (22–3)	Wake Forest (26–3)	Wake Forest (28–4)	Wake Forest (31–5)	Wake Forest (34–6)	Vanderbilt (31–11)	Vanderbilt (33–13)	Florida (40–12)	Arkansas (39–15)	Vanderbilt (40–18)	Wake Forest (54–12)	3.
4.	Stanford	Louisville (3–0)	Louisville (6–1)	Louisville (10–1)	Tennessee (14–3)	Wake Forest (18–3)	Vanderbilt (19–5)	Vanderbilt (22–5)	Vanderbilt (25–6)	Vanderbilt (28–7)	Florida (31–10)	South Carolina (35–8)	Arkansas (36–12)	Stanford (34–14)	Stanford (37–14)	Clemson (43–17)	TCU (44–24)	4.
5.	Louisville	Vanderbilt (2–1)	Vanderbilt (5–3)	Tennessee (11–2)	Wake Forest (15–2)	Vanderbilt (16–5)	Virginia (22–2)	Arkansas (23–5)	South Carolina (28–4)	Arkansas (29–7)	Vanderbilt (28–11)	Florida (35–10)	Stanford (31–13)	LSU (39–12)	LSU (42–13)	Arkansas (41–16)	Tennessee (44–22)	5.
6.	Vanderbilt	Tennessee (1–2)	Tennessee (6–2)	Wake Forest (13–0)	Ole Miss (14–2)	Arkansas (18–2)	Stanford (15–5)	South Carolina (26–3)	Arkansas (25–6)	South Carolina (30–6)	Arkansas (30–10)	Arkansas (33–11)	South Carolina (36–11)	Vanderbilt (34–16)	Vanderbilt (36–17)	Stanford (38–16)	Stanford (44–20)	6.
7.	Texas A&M	Texas A&M (3–0)	Wake Forest (9–0)	Vanderbilt (8–4)	Arkansas (13–2)	Virginia (17–2)	Arkansas (20–4)	Stanford (18–7)	Stanford (21–7)	East Carolina (28–8)	Coastal Carolina (26–12)	Coastal Carolina (28–14)	Florida (37–12)	West Virginia (39–13)	Clemson (39–17)	LSU (43–15)	Oral Roberts (52–14)	7.
8.	Miami (FL)	Wake Forest (4–0)	Ole Miss (6–1)	Ole Miss (10–2)	Vanderbilt (12–5)	Stanford (13–5)	Louisville (19–4)	Virginia (24–4)	Virginia (24–4)	Coastal Carolina (23–11)	Campbell (31–8)	Stanford (28–13)	Coastal Carolina (30–16)	Coastal Carolina (33–17)	Coastal Carolina (37–17)	Coastal Carolina (39–19)	Virginia (50–15)	8.
9.	Wake Forest	Ole Miss (3–0)	Arkansas (5–2)	Arkansas (9–2)	Virginia (14–1)	UCLA (15–3)	East Carolina (19–5)	Boston College (20–6)	East Carolina (24–8)	Virginia (27–6)	Stanford (25–12)	Duke (31–13)	Duke (32–13)	Miami (FL) (33–14)	Virginia (44–11)	Miami (FL) (39–16)	Texas (42–22)	9.
10.	Ole Miss	TCU (2–1)	Miami (FL) (7–1)	TCU (7–4)	Stanford (10–5)	East Carolina (16–4)	South Carolina (23–2)	Kentucky (25–3)	Louisville (24–7)	Campbell (27–8)	Texas Tech (29–13)	Miami (FL) (27–13)	Miami (FL) (30–13)	South Carolina (37–14)	Miami (FL) (36–15)	Virginia (45–12)	Duke (39–24)	10.
11.	Arkansas	Arkansas (2–1)	TCU (4–3)	Virginia Tech (9–2)	Texas A&M (12–4)	Tennessee (15–6)	Tennessee (19–6)	Oklahoma State (22–7)	Campbell (24–6)	Stanford (23–10)	Virginia (28–9)	West Virginia (33–11)	West Virginia (36–12)	Campbell (39–11)	East Carolina (41–15)	Campbell (44–13)	Indiana State (45–17)	11.
12.	UCLA	Miami (FL) (2–1)	Texas A&M (4–3)	Texas A&M (7–4)	UCLA (12–3)	Texas A&M (14–6)	UCLA (16–5)	Tennessee (21–8)	Kentucky (27–5)	Kentucky (28–7)	Arizona State (27–12)	Campbell (31–10)	Campbell (36–10)	Duke (34–16)	Oklahoma State (37–16)	Oklahoma State (41–18)	Southern Miss (46–20)	12.
13.	Virginia Tech	UCLA (3–0)	Virginia Tech (5–2)	UCLA (9–2)	TCU (9–6)	Miami (FL) (14–6)	Boston College (17–5)	Campbell (22–4)	North Carolina (22–10)	Louisville (26–9)	Miami (FL) (24–12)	East Carolina (31–13)	East Carolina (34–14)	East Carolina (38–14)	Texas (38–17)	East Carolina (45–17)	Oregon (41–22)	13.
14.	TCU	Virginia Tech (2–1)	UCLA (5–2)	Virginia (11–0)	East Carolina (12–3)	South Carolina (20–1)	Campbell (19–3)	Miami (FL) (19–9)	Oklahoma State (23–10)	Texas (26–12)	East Carolina (29–11)	Virginia (31–11)	Virginia (37–11)	Virginia (41–11)	West Virginia (39–16)	Dallas Baptist (45–14)	Vanderbilt (42–20)	14.
15.	Oklahoma State	Maryland (2–1)	Virginia (7–0)	Oregon State (9–2)	Virginia Tech (12–4)	Ole Miss (14–6)	North Carolina (18–6)	East Carolina (20–8)	Texas (23–10)	Texas Tech (25–12)	Kentucky (30–9)	Texas Tech (30–15)	Texas Tech (32–16)	Dallas Baptist (40–12)	Campbell (41–13)	Texas (38–19)	Clemson (44–19)	15.
16.	Maryland	North Carolina (2–1)	Florida State (6–1)	East Carolina (7–3)	Miami (FL) (10–6)	Texas Tech (18–4)	Miami (FL) (15–9)	North Carolina (20–8)	Boston College (21–9)	Miami (FL) (21–10)	Duke (27–12)	Dallas Baptist (34–10)	Dallas Baptist (36–12)	Clemson (35–17)	Dallas Baptist (42–13)	West Virginia (39–18)	Arkansas (43–18)	16.
17.	North Carolina	Virginia (3–0)	Maryland (3–4)	Miami (FL) (8–4)	Oklahoma State (14–3)	Boston College (14–3)	Oklahoma State (20–5)	Louisville (21–6)	Tennessee (22–10)	North Carolina (24–12)	West Virginia (29–11)	Oregon (30–13)	Oregon State (33–14)	Oregon State (36–15)	Oregon State (39–16)	Southern Miss (41–17)	South Carolina (42–21)	17.
18.	Oregon State	Southern Miss (3–0)	Texas Tech (8–0)	Oklahoma State (8–3)	Boston College (12–2)	Missouri (16–3)	Kentucky (21–3)	Texas Tech (20–9)	Coastal Carolina (20–9)	Arizona State (25–10)	Boston College (27–12)	Arizona State (29–15)	Clemson (31–17)	Oklahoma State (35–15)	Tennessee (38–18)	Alabama (40–19)	Alabama (43–21)	18.
19.	Virginia	Oregon State (2–1)	Oregon State (6–1)	North Carolina (9–3)	South Carolina (16–1)	North Carolina (15–5)	Texas (18–7)	West Virginia (21–7)	Texas Tech (22–10)	Oregon State (24–11)	Dallas Baptist (31–9)	Oregon State (30–13)	Kentucky (33–13)	Tennessee (35–17)	Duke (35–19)	Oregon State (39–18)	Kentucky (40–21)	19.
20.	Oregon	Oregon (4–0)	East Carolina (5–1)	Auburn (9–1–1)	Texas Tech (14–3)	Oklahoma State (16–5)	Texas Tech (18–7)	Texas (20–9)	Miami (FL) (20–12)	Oregon (24–10)	Oregon (26–12)	Oklahoma State (30–13)	Oklahoma State (33–14)	Kentucky (35–15)	Auburn (33–19–1)	Tennessee (38–19)	Coastal Carolina (42–21)	20.
21.	Southern Miss	Oklahoma State (1–2)	Oklahoma State (4–3)	NC State (12–0)	North Carolina (12–5)	Campbell (15–3)	Florida Gulf Coast (21–4)	Florida Gulf Coast (23–5)	USC (20–10–1)	Dallas Baptist (27–9)	Oklahoma State (28–13)	Tennessee (30–14)	UConn (35–11)	UConn (38–12)	Kentucky (36–17)	Duke (35–21)	Miami (FL) (42–21)	21.
22.	Auburn	Texas Tech (4–0)	North Carolina (4–3)	Southern Miss (8–3)	Oregon State (11–4)	Florida Gulf Coast (16–4)	Iowa (19–3)	Coastal Carolina (18–7)	Arizona State (23–9)	UTSA (28–8)	Oregon State (26–13)	UTSA (33–11)	Maryland (32–16)	Auburn (30–19–1)	South Carolina (38–17)	Auburn (34–21–1)	Campbell (46–15)	22.
23.	Texas Tech	Auburn (2–1)	Auburn (5–1–1)	South Carolina (11–1)	Florida Gulf Coast (14–3)	Iowa (15–3)	UC Santa Barbara (17–4)	UConn (20–6)	TCU (20–12)	UConn (26–9)	UTSA (30–10)	UConn (32–11)	USTA (36–12)	Maryland (34–18)	UConn (40–13)	Maryland (41–19)	Oklahoma State (41–20)	23.
24.	East Carolina	East Carolina (3–0)	NC State (7–0)	Florida Gulf Coast (10–2)	NC State (14–2)	UC Santa Barbara (15–3)	UConn (16–5)	UTSA (23–6)	Florida Gulf Coast (26–6)	Oklahoma State (24–13)	UConn (29–11)	Maryland (29–15)	Oregon (31–16)	Washington (32–14)	Maryland (36–19)	TCU (37–22)	East Carolina (47–19)	24.
25.	NC State	NC State (3–0)	Southern Miss (5–2)	Texas Tech (11–2)	Southern Miss (10–5)	Kentucky (18–2)	Missouri (17–6)	USC (16–10–1)	UConn (22–8)	Southern Miss (22–12)	Indiana (29–11)	Boston College (29–14)	Auburn (27–19–1)	Indiana State (35–14)	Indiana State (38–14)	Indiana State (42–15)	Dallas Baptist (47–16)	25.
	Preseason Jan 23	Week 1 Feb 20	Week 2 Feb 27	Week 3 Mar 6	Week 4 Mar 13	Week 5 Mar 20	Week 6 Mar 27	Week 7 Apr 3	Week 8 Apr 10	Week 9 Apr 17	Week 10 Apr 24	Week 11 May 1	Week 12 May 8	Week 13 May 15	Week 14 May 22	Week 15 May 29	Final Jun 27	
		None	Dropped: No. 20 Oregon	Dropped: No. 16 Florida State; No. 17 Maryland	Dropped: No. 20 Auburn	Dropped: No. 13 TCU; No. 15 Virginia Tech; No. 22 Oregon State; No. 24 NC State; No. 25 Southern Miss	Dropped: No. 12 Texas A&M; No. 15 Ole Miss	Dropped: No. 12 UCLA; No. 22 Iowa; No. 23 UC Santa Barbara; No. 25 Missouri	Dropped: No. 19 West Virginia; No. 24 UTSA	Dropped: No. 16 Boston College; No. 17 Tennessee; No. 21 USC; No. 23 TCU; No. 24 Florida Gulf Coast	Dropped: No. 13 Louisville; No. 14 Texas; No. 17 North Carolina; No. 30 Southern Miss	Dropped: No. 15 Kentucky; No. 25 Indiana	Dropped: No. 18 Arizona State; No. 21 Tennessee; No. 25 Boston College	Dropped: No. 15 Texas Tech; No. 23 USTA; No. 24 Oregon	Dropped: No. 24 Washington	Dropped: No. 21 Kentucky; No. 22 South Carolina; No. 23 UConn	Dropped: No. 16 West Virginia; No. 19 Oregon State; No. 22 Auburn; No. 23 Maryland	

== Collegiate Baseball ==
	Preseason Dec 20	Week 1 Feb 20	Week 2 Feb 27	Week 3 Mar 6	Week 4 Mar 13	Week 5 Mar 20	Week 6 Mar 27	Week 7 Apr 3	Week 8 Apr 10	Week 9 Apr 17	Week 10 Apr 24	Week 11 May 1	Week 12 May 8	Week 13 May 15	Week 14 May 22	Week 15 May 29	Week 16 Jun 6	Week 17 Jun 12	Final Jun 27	
1.	LSU	LSU (3–0)	LSU (6–1)	LSU (10–1)	LSU (15–1)	LSU (18–2)	LSU (21–3)	LSU (24–4)	LSU (26–5)	LSU (29–6)	LSU (32–7)	LSU (35–8)	Wake Forest (39–7)	Wake Forest (42–8)	Wake Forest (45–9)	Wake Forest (47–10)	Wake Forest (50–10)	Wake Forest (52–10)	LSU (54–17)	1.
2.	Florida	Florida (3–0)	Wake Forest (9–0)	Wake Forest (13–0)	Louisville (14–1)	Louisville (17–2)	South Carolina (23–2)	Vanderbilt (23–5)	Vanderbilt (26–6)	Vanderbilt (29–7)	Wake Forest (34–6)	Wake Forest (37–6)	LSU (37–10)	Arkansas (38–13)	Stanford (37–14)	Florida (44–14)	Florida (48–15)	Florida (50–15)	Florida (54–17)	2.
3.	Stanford	Stanford (2–1)	Florida (7–1)	Tennessee (11–2)	Tennessee (14–3)	Arkansas (18–2)	Virginia (22–2)	South Carolina (26–3)	South Carolina (28–4)	Wake Forest (31–5)	South Carolina (34–6)	Vanderbilt (32–11)	Arkansas (36–12)	Stanford (34–14)	Florida (42–13)	Clemson (43–17)	LSU (46–15)	LSU (48–15)	Wake Forest (54–12)	3.
4.	Texas A&M	Texas A&M (3–0)	Louisville (6–1)	Louisville (10–1)	Virginia (14–1)	South Carolina (20–1)	Wake Forest (22–3)	Wake Forest (26–3)	Wake Forest (28–4)	Arkansas (29–7)	Arizona State (27–12)	South Carolina (35–8)	Stanford (31–13)	Florida (40–12)	Arkansas (39–15)	Arkansas (41–16)	Stanford (42–17)	Stanford (44–18)	TCU (44–24)	4.
5.	Tennessee	Louisville (3–0)	Miami (FL) (7–1)	Stanford (9–2)	Wake Forest (15–2)	Virginia (17–2)	Florida (22–4)	Virginia (24–4)	Virginia (28–4)	Florida (30–7)	Cal State Fullerton (23–11)	Arkansas (33–11)	Vanderbilt (34–13)	LSU (39–12)	LSU (42–13)	LSU (43–15)	Virginia (48–12)	Virginia (50–13)	Oral Roberts (52–14)	5.
6.	Louisville	Wake Forest (4–0)	Tennessee (6–2)	Virginia (11–0)	Florida (15–3)	Wake Forest (18–3)	Vanderbilt (19–5)	Florida (24–5)	Florida (27–6)	South Carolina (30–6)	Vanderbilt (29–11)	Florida (35–10)	Duke (32–13)	Miami (FL) (34–17)	Virginia (44–11)	Stanford (38–16)	Indiana State (45–15)	Oral Roberts (51–12)	Tennessee (44–22)	6.
7.	Arkansas	Arkansas (2–1)	Stanford (5–2)	Florida (10–3)	Arkansas (13–2)	Florida (18–4)	Arkansas (20–4)	Arkansas (23–5)	Arkansas (25–6)	Virginia (31–6)	Arkansas (30–10)	Stanford (28–13)	Miami (FL) (31–16)	Virginia (41–11)	Clemson (39–17)	Miami (FL) (40–19)	Oral Roberts (49–11)	Tennessee (43–20)	Virginia (50–15)	7.
8.	Miami (FL)	Miami (FL) (2–1)	Arkansas (5–2)	Arkansas (9–2)	Vanderbilt (12–5)	Vanderbilt (16–5)	Louisville (19–4)	Kentucky (25–3)	Louisville (24–7)	Arizona State (25–10)	Florida (31–10)	Miami (FL) (28–16)	Florida (37–12)	West Virginia (39–13)	Miami (FL) (37–18)	Virginia (45–12)	Tennessee (41–19)	TCU (42–22)	Stanford (44–20)	8.
9.	Vanderbilt	Vanderbilt (2–1)	Vanderbilt (5–3)	Vanderbilt (8–4)	UCLA (12–3)	UCLA (15–3)	UC Santa Barbara (17–4)	Louisville (21–6)	Stanford (21–7)	Kentucky (28–7)	Virginia (32–9)	UC Santa Barbara (28–12)	South Carolina (36–11)	Indiana State (35–14)	Indiana State (38–14)	Indiana State (42–15)	Southern Miss (45–18)	Indiana State (45–17)	Indiana State (45–17)	9.
10.	Wake Forest	UCLA (3–0)	UCLA (5–2)	UCLA (9–2)	UC Santa Barbara (11–3)	UC Santa Barbara (15–3)	East Carolina (19–5)	Stanford (18–7)	Arizona State (23–9)	Louisville (26–9)	Kentucky (30–9)	Oregon (30–13)	Virginia (37–11)	Oklahoma State (35–15)	Oral Roberts (43–11)	Oral Roberts (46–11)	Texas (41–20)	Southern Miss (46–20)	Southern Miss (46–20)	10.
11.	North Carolina	Tennessee (1–2)	UC Santa Barbara (5–2)	NC State (12–0)	Ole Miss (14–2)	Miami (FL) (14–6)	Stanford (15–5)	UC Santa Barbara (18–6)	Kentucky (27–5)	Stanford (23–10)	Stanford (25–12)	Arizona State (29–15)	Indiana State (32–13)	Clemson (35–17)	Coastal Carolina (37–17)	Vanderbilt (41–18)	Alabama (43–19)	Texas (42–22)	Texas (42–22)	11.
12.	Oklahoma State	TCU (2–1)	Virginia (7–0)	UC Santa Barbara (7–3)	Miami (FL) (10–6)	Texas Tech (18–4)	Kentucky (21–3)	Oklahoma State (22–7)	Texas (23–10)	Texas (26–12)	Miami (FL) (25–15)	Cal State Fullerton (26–13)	West Virginia (36–12)	Oral Roberts (40–11)	Southern Miss (37–16)	Coastal Carolina (39–19)	TCU (40–22)	Alabama (43–21)	Alabama (43–21)	12.
13.	UCLA	North Carolina (2–1)	Texas Tech (8–0)	Ole Miss (10–2)	NC State (14–2)	East Carolina (16–4)	UCLA (16–5)	Texas (20–9)	Cal State Fullerton (16–10)	Cal State Fullerton (19–11)	UC Santa Barbara (25–12)	Duke (31–13)	Oklahoma State (33–14)	Coastal Carolina (33–17)	Texas (38–18)	Southern Miss (41–17)	Oregon (40–20)	Oregon (41–22)	Oregon (41–22)	13.
14.	UC Santa Barbara	UC Santa Barbara (2–1)	East Carolina (5–1)	Miami (FL) (8–4)	South Carolina (16–1)	Stanford (13–5)	Oklahoma State (20–5)	North Carolina (20–8)	North Carolina (22–10)	East Carolina (28–8)	Indiana State (25–12)	Virginia (35–11)	Maryland (33–16)	Southern Miss (35–15)	Oklahoma State (37–16)	Oklahoma State (41–18)	South Carolina (42–19)	South Carolina (42–21)	South Carolina (42–21)	14.
15.	TCU	Virginia (3–0)	Ole Miss (6–1)	Oregon State (9–2)	Texas A&M (12–4)	Missouri (16–3)	Texas (18–7)	Campbell (22–4)	East Carolina (24–8)	Miami (FL) (22–13)	Oregon (26–12)	Indiana State (28–13)	Kansas State (31–18)	Vanderbilt (35–16)	Vanderbilt (37–17)	Texas (38–20)	Duke (38–22)	Duke (39–24)	Duke (39–24)	15.
16.	Virginia	Oklahoma State (1–2)	Georgia Tech (7–0)	Iowa (9–1)	Texas Tech (14–3)	Kentucky (18–2)	Tennessee (19–6)	Arizona State (19–9)	UC Santa Barbara (19–9)	Oregon (24–10)	Campbell (31–8)	Oklahoma State (30–13)	Oral Roberts (36–11)	South Carolina (37–14)	Auburn (33–19–1)	Auburn (34–21–1)	Kentucky (40–19)	Kentucky (40–21)	Kentucky (40–21)	16.
17.	Texas Tech	Texas Tech (4–0)	Florida State (6–1)	Texas A&M (7–4)	East Carolina (12–3)	Boston College (14–3)	Iowa (19–3)	Tennessee (21–8)	TCU (20–12)	North Carolina (24–12)	Oklahoma State (28–13)	West Virginia (33–11)	Clemson (31–17)	Duke (34–16)	Oregon State (39–16)	Maryland (41–19)	Clemson (44–19)	Clemson (44–19)	Clemson (44–19)	17.
18.	Southern Miss	Southern Miss (3–0)	Oregon State (6–1)	Texas Tech (11–2)	Oklahoma State (14–3)	Texas A&M (14–6)	North Carolina (18–6)	Miami (FL) (19–9)	Oklahoma State (23–10)	UC Santa Barbara (22–11)	West Virginia (29–11)	Dallas Baptist (34–10)	Cal State Fullerton (28–15)	Oregon State (36–15)	West Virginia (39–16)	Oregon State (39–18)	Arkansas (43–18)	Arkansas (43–18)	Arkansas (43–18)	18.
19.	Oregon	Oregon (4–0)	NC State (7–0)	East Carolina (7–3)	Stanford (10–5)	Oklahoma State (16–5)	Campbell (19–3)	Boston College (20–6)	Campbell (24–6)	TCU (22–14)	Boston College (27–12)	Tennessee (30–14)	Coastal Carolina (30–16)	Alabama (35–17)	Alabama (38–17)	Alabama (40–19)	Miami (FL) (42–21)	Miami (FL) (42–21)	Miami (FL) (42–21)	19.
20.	East Carolina	East Carolina (3–0)	TCU (4–3)	Auburn (9–1–1)	Washington State (13–2)	Iowa (15–3)	Arizona State (16–8)	Oregon (18–7)	Tennessee (22–10)	Campbell (27–8)	Dallas Baptist (31–9)	Coastal Carolina (28–14)	UC Santa Barbara (30–14)	UConn (38–12)	UConn (40–13)	UConn (43–15)	Vanderbilt (42–20)	Vanderbilt (42–20)	Vanderbilt (42–20)	20.
21.	Maryland	Ole Miss (3–0)	North Carolina (4–3)	North Carolina (9–3)	Arizona (12–3)	North Carolina (15–5)	Miami (FL) (15–9)	Cal State Fullerton (14–9)	Miami (FL) (20–12)	Texas Tech (25–12)	Duke (27–12)	Maryland (30–15)	Kentucky (33–13)	Campbell (39–11)	Dallas Baptist (42–13)	Dallas Baptist (45–14)	Coastal Carolina (42–21)	Coastal Carolina (42–21)	Coastal Carolina (42–21)	21.
22.	Mississippi State	Georgia Tech (3–0)	Texas A&M (4–3)	Alabama (12–0)	Iowa (11–3)	Tennessee (15–6)	Texas Tech (18–7)	East Carolina (20–8)	Oregon (20–9)	Indiana State (22–12)	Texas Tech (29–13)	Kansas State (28–17)	Kent State (34–13)	Dallas Baptist (40–12)	Maryland (37–19)	Iowa (42–14)	Oregon State (41–20)	Oregon State (41–20)	Oregon State (41–20)	22.
23.	Georgia Tech	Maryland (2–1)	Oklahoma State (4–3)	TCU (7–4)	Oregon State (11–4)	Ole Miss (14–6)	Boston College (17–5)	Texas Tech (20–9)	Texas Tech (22–10)	Indiana (25–11)	Indiana (30–11)	Kent State (31–12)	Oregon State (33–14)	Maryland (35–18)	Kent State (40–14)	TCU (37–22)	Dallas Baptist (47–16)	Dallas Baptist (47–16)	Dallas Baptist (47–16)	23.
24.	Ole Miss	Mississippi State (2–1)	Iowa (5–1)	Oklahoma State (8–3)	Auburn (12–3–1)	Old Dominion (18–2)	UConn (16–5)	UConn (20–6)	USC (20–10–1)	Kent State (25–10)	Central Michigan (26–13)	Oral Roberts (32–11)	Alabama (32–16)	Kent State (37–14)	East Carolina (41–15)	Oregon (37–20)	Iowa (44–16)	Iowa (44–16)	Iowa (44–16)	24.
25.	Texas	Florida State (3–0)	Southern Miss (5–2)	South Carolina (11–1)	North Carolina (12–5)	NC State (15–5)	Florida Gulf Coast (21–4)	Florida Gulf Coast (23–5)	Florida Gulf Coast (26–6)	UTSA (28–8)	Wichita State (24–15)	Clemson (28–17)	Campbell (36–10)	East Carolina (38–14)	Tennessee (38–18)	Campbell (44–13)	Campbell (46–15)	Campbell (46–15)	Campbell (46–15)	25.
26.	Central Michigan	Arizona (2–1)	Auburn (5–1–1)	Georgia Tech (10–2)	Alabama (15–2)	UConn (12–5)	Ball State (17–6)	Ball State (20–7)	Ball State (23–8)	Dallas Baptist (27–9)	Tennessee (26–14)	Central Michigan (29–14)	UConn (35–11)	Kansas State (33–20)	South Carolina (38–17)	Tennessee (38–19)	East Carolina (47–19)	East Carolina (47–19)	East Carolina (47–19)	26.
27.	Oregon State	Central Michigan (2–1)	Alabama (8–0)	UC Irvine (10–1)	Georgia Tech (13–3)	Florida Gulf Coast (16–4)	Old Dominion (20–4)	Coastal Carolina (18–7)	UC San Diego (20–9)	Central Michigan (21–13)	Kent State (27–12)	Boston College (29–14)	Southern Miss (32–15)	UC Santa Barbara (32–16)	Duke (35–19)	East Carolina (45–17)	Maryland (42–21)	Maryland (42–21)	Maryland (42–21)	27.
28.	Virginia Tech	Oregon State (2–1)	Virginia Tech (5–2)	Virginia Tech (9–2)	UC Irvine (11–3)	Alabama (17–4)	UC San Diego (15–6)	West Virginia (21–7)	Louisiana (23–9)	UConn (26–9)	Coastal Carolina (26–12)	Campbell (31–10)	Tennessee (32–16)	Kentucky (35–15)	UC Santa Barbara (35–17)	South Carolina (39–19)	Boston College (37–20)	Boston College (37–20)	Boston College (37–20)	28.
29.	Rutgers	Virginia Tech (2–1)	South Carolina (8–0)	Florida Gulf Coast (10–2)	Virginia Tech (12–4)	Georgia Tech (14–6)	USC (14–8–1)	Old Dominion (22–6)	Coastal Carolina (20–9)	Coastal Carolina (23–11)	UConn (29–11)	UConn (32–11)	Dallas Baptist (36–12)	Tennessee (35–17)	Boston College (34–17)	West Virginia (39–18)	Penn (34–16)	Penn (34–16)	Penn (34–16)	29.
30.	NC State	NC State (3–0)	San Diego (5–0–1)	Southern Miss (8–3)	Florida Gulf Coast (14–3)	UC Irvine (12–5)	Washington (16–6)	UC San Diego (17–8)	Xavier (20–12)	Oral Roberts (27–10)	Oral Roberts (29–11)	Southern Miss (28–15)	Houston (28–19)	Boston College (32–16)	Campbell (41–13)	Boston College (35–18)	Xavier (39–25)	Xavier (39–25)	Xavier (39–25)	30.
	Preseason Dec 20	Week 1 Feb 20	Week 2 Feb 27	Week 3 Mar 6	Week 4 Mar 13	Week 5 Mar 20	Week 6 Mar 27	Week 7 Apr 3	Week 8 Apr 10	Week 9 Apr 17	Week 10 Apr 24	Week 11 May 1	Week 12 May 8	Week 13 May 15	Week 14 May 22	Week 15 May 29	Week 16 Jun 6	Week 17 Jun 12	Final Jun 27	
		Dropped: No. 25 Texas; No. 29 Rutgers	Dropped: No. 19 Oregon; No. 23 Maryland; No. 24 Mississippi State; No. 26 Arizona; No. 27 Central Michigan	Dropped: No. 17 Florida State; No. 30 San Diego	Dropped: No. 23 TCU; No. 30 Southern Miss	Dropped: No. 20 Washington State; No. 21 Arizona; No. 23 Oregon State; No. 24 Auburn; No. 29 Virginia Tech	Dropped: No. 15 Missouri; No. 18 Texas A&M; No. 23 Ole Miss; No. 25 NC State; No. 28 Alabama; No. 29 Georgia Tech; No. 30 UC Irvine	Dropped: No. 13 UCLA; No. 17 Iowa; No. 29 USC; No. 30 Washington	Dropped: No. 19 Boston College; No. 24 UConn; No. 28 West Virginia; No. 29 Old Dominion	Dropped: No. 18 Oklahoma State; No. 20 Tennessee; No. 24 USC; No. 25 Florida Gulf Coast; No. 26 Ball State; No. 27 UC San Diego; No. 28 Louisiana; No. 30 Xavier	Dropped: No. 10 Louisville; No. 12 Texas; No. 14 East Carolina; No. 17 North Carolina; No. 19 TCU; No. 25 UTSA	Dropped: No. 10 Kentucky; No. 22 Texas Tech; No. 23 Indiana; No. 25 Wichita State	Dropped: No. 10 Oregon; No. 11 Arizona State; No. 26 Central Michigan; No. 27 Boston College	Dropped: No. 18 Cal State Fullerton; No. 30 Houston	Dropped: No. 26 Kansas State; No. 28 Kentucky	Dropped: No. 23 Kent State; No. 27 Duke; No. 28 UC Santa Barbara	Dropped: No. 14 Oklahoma State; No. 16 Auburn; No. 20 UConn; No. 29 West Virginia	None	None	

The Preseason poll ranked the top 50 teams in the nation. Teams not listed above are: 31. UConn; 32. Florida State; 33. Arizona; 34. Houston; 35. Georgia Southern; 36. Grand Canyon; 37. Auburn; 38. Gonzaga; 39 Georgia; 40. Louisiana Tech; 41. Dallas Baptist; 42. Clemson; 43. Oklahoma; 44. Michigan; 45. Davidson; 46. Eastern Kentucky; 47. South Carolina; 48. San Diego; 49. Alabama; 50. BYU.

== NCBWA ==
	Preseason Jan 31	Week 1 Feb 20	Week 2 Feb 27	Week 3 Mar 6	Week 4 Mar 13	Week 5 Mar 20	Week 6 Mar 27	Week 7 Apr 3	Week 8 Apr 10	Week 9 Apr 17	Week 10 Apr 24	Week 11 May 1	Week 12 May 8	Week 13 May 15	Week 14 May 22	Week 15 May 29	Week 16 Jun 6	Final Jun 27	
1.	LSU	LSU (3–0)	LSU (6–1)	LSU (10–1)	LSU (15–1)	LSU (18–2)	LSU (21–3)	LSU (24–4)	LSU (26–5)	LSU (29–6)	LSU (32–7)	LSU (35–8)	Wake Forest (39–7)	Wake Forest (42–8)	Wake Forest (45–9)	Wake Forest (47–10)	Wake Forest (50–10)	LSU (54–17)	1.
2.	Tennessee	Stanford (2–1)	Florida (7–1)	Wake Forest (13–0)	Ole Miss (14–2)	Florida (18–4)	Florida (22–4)	Wake Forest (26–3)	Wake Forest (28–4)т	Wake Forest (31–5)	Wake Forest (34–6)	Wake Forest (37–6)	LSU (37–10)	Arkansas (38–13)	Florida (42–13)	Florida (44–14)	Florida (48–15)	Florida (54–17)	2.
3.	Stanford	Florida (3–0)	Wake Forest (9–0)	Stanford (9–2)	Florida (15–3)	Arkansas (18–2)	Wake Forest (22–3)	Florida (24–5)	Florida (27–6)т	Florida (30–7)	South Carolina (34–6)	Florida (35–10)	Arkansas (36–12)	Florida (40–12)	Stanford (37–14)т	Vanderbilt (41–18)	LSU (46–15)	Wake Forest (54–12)	3.
4.	Florida	Texas A&M (3–0)	Stanford (5–2)	Tennessee (11–2)	Tennessee (14–3)	Wake Forest (18–3)	Vanderbilt (19–5)	Vanderbilt (23–5)	Vanderbilt (26–6)	Vanderbilt (29–7)	Florida (31–10)	South Carolina (35–8)	Stanford (31–13)	LSU (39–12)	LSU (42–13)т	Arkansas (41–16)	Stanford (42–17)	TCU (44–24)	4.
5.	Texas A&M	Ole Miss (3–0)	Ole Miss (6–1)	Ole Miss (10–2)	Wake Forest (15–2)	Vanderbilt (16–5)	Virginia (22–2)	Arkansas (23–5)	Arkansas (25–6)	Arkansas (29–7)	Campbell (31–8)	Vanderbilt (32–11)	Vanderbilt (34–13)	Stanford (34–14)	Arkansas (39–15)	LSU (43–15)	Virginia (48–12)	Tennessee (44–22)	5.
6.	Arkansas	Wake Forest (4–0)	Tennessee (6–2)	Florida (10–3)	Arkansas (13–2)	Louisville (17–2)	Arkansas (20–4)	South Carolina (26–3)	Virginia (28–4)	East Carolina (28–8)	Arkansas (30–10)	Arkansas (33–11)	Florida (37–12)	West Virginia (39–13)	Vanderbilt (37–17)	Clemson (43–17)	Tennessee (41–19)	Oral Roberts (52–14)	6.
7.	Ole Miss	Arkansas (2–1)	Arkansas (5–2)	Arkansas (9–2)	Louisville (14–1)	Virginia (17–2)	South Carolina (23–2)	Virginia (24–4)	South Carolina (28–4)	South Carolina (30–6)	Stanford (25–12)	Stanford (28–13)	South Carolina (36–11)	UConn (38–12)	UConn (40–13)	Stanford (38–16)	South Carolina (42–19)	Virginia (50–15)	7.
8.	Wake Forest	TCU (2–1)	Vanderbilt (5–3)	Louisville (10–1)	Vanderbilt (12–5)	UCLA (15–3)	Stanford (15–5)	Stanford (18–7)	Stanford (21–7)	Virginia (31–6)	Vanderbilt (29–11)	Coastal Carolina (28–14)	Campbell (36–10)	Coastal Carolina (33–17)	Coastal Carolina (37–17)	Miami (FL) (40–19)	Alabama (43–19)	Stanford (44–20)	8.
9.	Vanderbilt	Vanderbilt (2–1)	East Carolina (5–1)	Vanderbilt (8–4)	Virginia (14–1)	South Carolina (20–1)	East Carolina (19–5)	Tennessee (21–8)	East Carolina (24–8)	Louisville (26–9)	Coastal Carolina (26–12)	UConn (32–11)	UConn (35–11)	Campbell (39–11)	Clemson (39–17)	Coastal Carolina (39–19)	TCU (40–22)	Indiana State (45–17)	9.
10.	Louisville	Louisville (3–0)	Louisville (6–1)	Virginia (11–0)	Stanford (10–5)	Stanford (13–5)	Louisville (19–4)	Boston College (20–6)	Louisville (24–7)	Stanford (23–10)	East Carolina (29–11)	Campbell (31–10)	Coastal Carolina (30–16)	East Carolina (38–14)	Miami (FL) (37–18)	Campbell (44–13)	Southern Miss (45–18)	Southern Miss (46–20)	10.
11.	Oklahoma State	Tennessee (1–2)	Virginia (7–0)	Virginia Tech (9–2)	UCLA (12–3)	East Carolina (16–4)	Tennessee (19–6)	Kentucky (25–3)	Kentucky (27–5)	Campbell (27–8)	Virginia (32–9)	East Carolina (31–13)	East Carolina (34–14)	Vanderbilt (35–16)	East Carolina (41–15)	Virginia (45–12)	Oregon (40–20)	Kentucky (40–21)т	11.
12.	East Carolina	East Carolina (3–0)	TCU (4–3)	UCLA (9–2)	East Carolina (12–3)	Tennessee (15–6)	UCLA (16–5)	East Carolina (20–8)	Tennessee (22–10)	Kentucky (28–7)	Boston College (27–12)	Dallas Baptist (34–10)	Duke (32–13)	South Carolina (37–14)	Virginia (44–11)	East Carolina (45–17)	Indiana State (45–15)	Texas (42–22)т	12.
13.	North Carolina	UCLA (3–0)	UCLA (5–2)	TCU (7–4)	Oklahoma State (14–3)	Ole Miss (14–6)	Oklahoma State (20–5)	Campbell (22–4)	North Carolina (22–10)	Coastal Carolina (23–11)	Kentucky (30–9)	Virginia (35–11)	West Virginia (36–12)	Clemson (35–17)	Oregon State (39–16)	UConn (43–15)	Duke (38–22)	South Carolina (42–21)	13.
14.	UCLA	North Carolina (3–0)	Virginia Tech (5–2)	NC State (12–0)	South Carolina (16–1)	Texas Tech (18–4)	North Carolina (18–6)	Louisville (21–6)	Boston College (21–9)	North Carolina (24–12)	UConn (29–11)	Duke (31–13)	Miami (FL) (31–16)	Dallas Baptist (40–12)	Campbell (41–13)	Dallas Baptist (45–14)	Oral Roberts (49–11)	Oregon (41–22)	14.
15.	Maryland	Southern Miss (3–0)	Texas A&M (4–3)	Oklahoma State (8–3)	Texas A&M (12–4)т	North Carolina (15–5)	Campbell (19–3)	Oklahoma State (22–7)	Florida Gulf Coast (26–6)	Texas (26–12)	Texas Tech (29–13)	West Virginia (33–11)	Kentucky (33–13)	Miami (FL) (34–17)	Tennessee (38–18)	Oklahoma State (41–18)	Kentucky (40–19)	Duke (39–24)	15.
16.	TCU	Maryland (2–1)	Texas Tech (8–0)	East Carolina (7–3)	TCU (9–6)т	Oklahoma State (16–5)	Kentucky (21–3)	North Carolina (20–8)	Campbell (24–6)	UConn (26–9)	Arizona State (27–12)	Tennessee (30–14)	Virginia (37–11)	Oregon State (36–15)	Dallas Baptist (42–13)	South Carolina (39–19)	Texas (41–20)	Alabama (43–21)	16.
17.	Miami (FL)	Virginia (3–0)	Miami (FL) (7–1)	North Carolina (9–3)	Virginia Tech (12–4)	Miami (FL) (14–6)	Boston College (17–5)	Florida Gulf Coast (23–5)	Oklahoma State (23–10)	Boston College (24–11)	Dallas Baptist (31–9)	Miami (FL) (28–16)	Dallas Baptist (36–12)	Virginia (41–11)	Oklahoma State (37–16)т	Southern Miss (41–17)	Arkansas (43–18)	Arkansas (43–18)	17.
18.	Virginia Tech	Virginia Tech (2–1)	Oklahoma State (4–3)	Alabama (12–0)	Texas Tech (14–3)	Campbell (15–3)	Florida Gulf Coast (21–4)	Miami (FL) (19–9)	Coastal Carolina (20–9)	Texas Tech (25–12)	Tennessee (26–14)	Boston College (29–14)	Oregon State (33–14)	Duke (34–16)	West Virginia (39–16)т	Tennessee (38–19)	Vanderbilt (42–20)	Clemson (44–19)	18.
19.	Virginia	Oklahoma State (1–2)	North Carolina (4–3)	Texas A&M (7–4)	North Carolina (12–5)	Texas A&M (14–6)	Texas Tech (18–7)	Texas Tech (20–9)	Texas (23–10)	Arizona State (25–10)	Louisville (26–13)	Oregon (30–13)	Tennessee (32–16)	Tennessee (35–17)	South Carolina (38–17)	Maryland (41–19)	Clemson (44–19)	Vanderbilt (42–20)	19.
20.	Southern Miss	Texas Tech (4–0)	NC State (7–0)	South Carolina (11–1)	NC State (14–2)	Boston College (14–3)	UC Santa Barbara (17–4)	Coastal Carolina (18–7)	Texas Tech (22–10)	Miami (FL) (22–13)	Miami (FL) (25–15)	Oregon State (30–13)	Boston College (30–16)	Kentucky (35–15)	Boston College (34–17)	Alabama (40–19)	Miami (FL) (42–21)	Dallas Baptist (47–16)т	20.
21.	Oregon	Alabama (3–0)	Alabama (8–0)	Texas Tech (11–2)	Florida State (11–4)	Missouri (16–3)	Iowa (16–3)	UConn (20–6)	UCLA (19–8–1)	Tennessee (23–13)	West Virginia (29–11)	Arizona State (29–15)	Clemson (31–17)	Boston College (32–16)	Southern Miss (37–16)	Oregon State (39–18)	Coastal Carolina (42–21)	Miami (FL) (42–21)т	21.
22.	Texas Tech	NC State (3–0)	Southern Miss (5–2)	Southern Miss (8–3)	Alabama (15–2)	Florida Gulf Coast (16–4)	Ole Miss (15–9)	West Virginia (21–7)	UConn (22–8)	UCLA (21–10–1)	Oregon (26–12)	Louisville (28–15)	UTSA (36–12)	Oklahoma State (35–15)	Duke (35–19)	Kentucky (36–18)	Dallas Baptist (47–16)	East Carolina (47–19)	22.
23.	Oregon State	Miami (FL) (2–1)	Florida State (6–1)	Miami (FL) (8–4)	Miami (FL) (10–6)	UC Santa Barbara (15–3)	Miami (FL) (15–9)	UCLA (16–8)	Arizona State (23–9)	Dallas Baptist (27–9)	Duke (27–12)	Kentucky (30–13)	Oklahoma State (33–14)	Maryland (35–18)	Kentucky (36–17)	Indiana State (42–15)	Oregon State (41–20)	Campbell (46–15)	23.
24.	NC State	Oregon (4–0)	South Carolina (8–0)	Oregon State (9–2)	Campbell (12–2)	Kentucky (18–2)	Texas (18–7)	Texas (20–9)	Miami (FL) (20–12)	Florida Gulf Coast (27–9)	Oklahoma State (28–13)	Texas Tech (30–15)	Texas Tech (32–16)	Southern Miss (35–15)	Maryland (37–19)	Duke (35–21)	Campbell (46–15)	Coastal Carolina (42–21)	24.
25.	Alabama	South Carolina (3–0)	Maryland (3–4)	Florida State (8–3)	Florida Gulf Coast (14–3)	Alabama (17–4)	West Virginia (18–6)	UC Santa Barbara (18–6)	West Virginia (23–9)	Oregon (24–10)	North Carolina (25–15)	UTSA (33–11)	Maryland (33–16)	Washington (32–14)	Texas (38–18)	West Virginia (39–18)	Texas A&M (38–27)	Texas A&M (38–27)	25.
26.	Texas	Oregon State (2–1)	Oregon State (6–1)	Auburn (9–1–1)	Oregon State (11–4)	West Virginia (15–4)	UConn (16–5)	Oregon (18–7)	USC (20–10–1)	Oklahoma State (24–13)	Texas (27–15)	Oklahoma State (30–13)	Oregon (31–16)	Indiana State (35–14)	Alabama (38–17)	Oregon (37–20)	East Carolina (47–19)	Oregon State (41–20)	26.
27.	Auburn	Arizona (2–1)	Auburn (5–1–1)	Iowa (8–1)	Southern Miss (10–5)	Grand Canyon (14–5)	TCU (15–9)	UTSA (23–6)	TCU (20–12)	Oregon State (24–11)	Oregon State (26–13)	Texas (30–15)	Arizona State (29–18)	Alabama (35–17)	Auburn (33–19–1)	Auburn (34–21–1)	UConn (44–17)	Oklahoma State (41–20)	27.
28.	South Carolina	Auburn (2–1)	Grand Canyon (6–2)	Grand Canyon (8–3)	UC Santa Barbara (11–3)	Iowa (13–3)	Coastal Carolina (14–7)	Iowa (17–6)	Texas A&M (20–12)	UTSA (28–8)	UTSA (30–10)	Maryland (30–15)	Alabama (32–16)	Texas Tech (35–18)	Indiana State (38–14)	TCU (37–22)	Indiana (43–20)	UConn (44–17)т	28.
29.	UC Santa Barbara	Grand Canyon (2–1)	UC Santa Barbara (5–2)	UC Santa Barbara (7–3)	Boston College (12–2)	NC State (15–5)	Missouri (17–6)	Texas A&M (17–11)	Dallas Baptist (23–9)	West Virginia (25–11)	Indiana (30–11)	Cal State Fullerton (26–13)	Southern Miss (32–15)	Auburn (30–19–1)	Oral Roberts (43–11)	Boston College (35–18)	Texas Tech (41–23)	Texas Tech (41–23)т	29.
30.	UConn	Florida State (3–0)	Georgia Tech (7–0)	Florida Gulf Coast (10–2)	Maryland (8–7)	TCU (10–9)	Texas A&M (15–9)	NC State (20–8)	Oregon (20–9)	Indiana (25–11)	Florida Gulf Coast (29–11)	Northeastern (35–7)	Indiana State (32–13)	UTSA (36–15)	Texas Tech (37–19)	Texas A&M (36–25)	Oklahoma State (41–20)	Indiana (43–20)	30.
	Preseason Jan 31	Week 1 Feb 20	Week 2 Feb 27	Week 3 Mar 6	Week 4 Mar 13	Week 5 Mar 20	Week 6 Mar 27	Week 7 Apr 3	Week 8 Apr 10	Week 9 Apr 17	Week 10 Apr 24	Week 11 May 1	Week 12 May 8	Week 13 May 15	Week 14 May 22	Week 15 May 29	Week 16 Jun 6	Final Jun 27	
		Dropped: No. 26 Texas; No. 29 UC Santa Barbara; No. 30 UConn	Dropped: No. 24 Oregon; No. 27 Arizona	Dropped: No. 25 Maryland; No. 30 Georgia Tech	Dropped: No. 26 Auburn; No. 27 Iowa; No. 28 Grand Canyon	Dropped: No. 17 Virginia Tech; No. 21 Florida State; No. 26 Oregon State; No. 27 Southern Miss; No. 30 Maryland	Dropped: No. 25 Alabama; No. 27 Grand Canyon; No. 29 NC State	Dropped: No. 22 Ole Miss; No. 27 TCU; No. 29 Missouri	Dropped: No. 25 UC Santa Barbara; No. 27 UTSA; No. 28 Iowa; No. 30 NC State	Dropped: No. 26 USC; No. 27 TCU; No. 28 Texas A&M	Dropped: No. 22 UCLA	Dropped: No. 25 North Carolina; No. 29 Indiana; No. 30 Florida Gulf Coast	Dropped: No. 22 Louisville; No. 27 Texas; No. 29 Cal State Fullerton; No. 30 Northeastern	Dropped: No. 26 Oregon; No. 27 Arizona State	Dropped: No. 25 Washington; No. 30 UTSA	Dropped: No. 25 Texas; No. 29 Oral Roberts; No. 30 Texas Tech	Dropped: No. 19 Maryland; No. 25 West Virginia; No. 27 Auburn; No. 29 Boston College	None	

The Preseason poll ranked the top 35 teams in the nation. Teams not listed above are: 31. Mississippi State; 32. Florida State; 33. Arizona; 34. Notre Dame; 35 Rutgers.

== D1Baseball ==
	Preseason Jan 17	Week 1 Feb 20	Week 2 Feb 27	Week 3 Mar 6	Week 4 Mar 13	Week 5 Mar 20	Week 6 Mar 27	Week 7 Apr 3	Week 8 Apr 10	Week 9 Apr 17	Week 10 Apr 24	Week 11 May 1	Week 12 May 8	Week 13 May 15	Week 14 May 22	Week 15 May 30	Final Jun 27	
1.	LSU	LSU (3–0)	LSU (6–1)	LSU (10–1)	LSU (15–1)	LSU (18–2)	LSU (21–3)	LSU (24–4)	LSU (26–5)	LSU (29–6)	LSU (32–7)	LSU (35–8)	Wake Forest (39–7)	Wake Forest (42–8)	Wake Forest (45–9)	Wake Forest (47–10)	LSU (54–17)	1.
2.	Tennessee	Stanford (2–1)	Stanford (5–2)	Stanford (9–2)	Tennessee (14–3)	Wake Forest (18–3)	Wake Forest (22–3)	Wake Forest (26–3)	Wake Forest (28–4)	Wake Forest (31–5)	Wake Forest (34–6)	Wake Forest (37–6)	LSU (37–10)	Arkansas (38–13)	Florida (42–13)	Florida (44–14)	Florida (54–17)	2.
3.	Stanford	Tennessee (1–2)	Tennessee (6–2)	Tennessee (11–2)	Ole Miss (14–2)	Florida (18–4)	Florida (22–4)	Florida (24–5)	Florida (27–6)	Florida (30–7)	South Carolina (34–6)	South Carolina (35–8)	Arkansas (36–12)	Stanford (34–14)	Stanford (37–14)	Clemson (43–17)	Wake Forest (54–12)	3.
4.	Ole Miss	Ole Miss (3–0)	Ole Miss (6–1)	Ole Miss (10–2)	Wake Forest (15–2)	Vanderbilt (16–5)	Vanderbilt (19–5)	Vanderbilt (23–5)	Vanderbilt (26–6)	Vanderbilt (29–7)	Florida (31–10)	Florida (35–10)	Stanford (31–13)	Florida (40–12)	Arkansas (39–15)	Vanderbilt (41–18)	Stanford (44–20)	4.
5.	Texas A&M	Texas A&M (3–0)	Wake Forest (9–0)	Wake Forest (13–0)	Florida (15–3)	Arkansas (18–2)	Virginia (22–2)	Arkansas (23–5)	Arkansas (25–6)	Arkansas (29–7)	Vanderbilt (29–11)	Vanderbilt (32–11)	Vanderbilt (34–13)	LSU (39–12)	LSU (42–13)	Arkansas (41–16)	TCU (44–24)	5.
6.	Wake Forest	Wake Forest (4–0)	Florida (7–1)	Florida (10–3)	Vanderbilt (12–5)	Louisville (17–2)	Arkansas (20–4)	South Carolina (26–3)	South Carolina (28–4)	South Carolina (30–6)	Coastal Carolina (26–12)	Arkansas (33–11)	South Carolina (36–11)	West Virginia (39–13)	Clemson (39–17)	Stanford (38–16)	Virginia (50–15)	6.
7.	Florida	Florida (3–0)	Vanderbilt (5–3)	Vanderbilt (8–4)	Arkansas (13–2)	UCLA (15–3)	Stanford (15–5)	Virginia (24–4)	Virginia (28–4)	East Carolina (28–8)	Arkansas (30–10)	Stanford (28–13)	Florida (37–12)	Clemson (35–17)	Coastal Carolina (37–17)	LSU (43–15)	Tennessee (44–22)	7.
8.	Arkansas	TCU (2–1)	Arkansas (5–2)	Arkansas (9–2)	Louisville (14–1)	Virginia (17–2)	East Carolina (19–5)	Stanford (18–7)	Stanford (21–7)	Virginia (31–6)	Stanford (25–12)	Coastal Carolina (28–14)	Coastal Carolina (30–16)	Coastal Carolina (33–17)	Vanderbilt (37–17)	Miami (FL) (40–19)	Oral Roberts (52–14)	8.
9.	Oklahoma State	Arkansas (2–1)	East Carolina (5–1)	Louisville (10–1)	Stanford (10–5)	Stanford (13–5)	South Carolina (23–2)	Boston College (20–6)	East Carolina (24–8)	Stanford (23–10)	Campbell (31–8)	UConn (32–11)	UConn (35–11)	UConn (38–12)	UConn (40–13)	Coastal Carolina (39–19)	Southern Miss (46–20)	9.
10.	Vanderbilt	Vanderbilt (2–1)	TCU (4–3)	TCU (7–4)	East Carolina (12–3)	East Carolina (16–4)	Tennessee (19–6)	Kentucky (25–3)	Louisville (24–7)	Coastal Carolina (23–11)	UConn (29–11)	Duke (31–13)	Duke (32–13)	Oregon State (36–15)	Oregon State (39–16)	UConn (43–15)	Alabama (43–21)	10.
11.	East Carolina	East Carolina (3–)	Virginia Tech (5–2)	Virginia Tech (9–2)	TCU (9–6)	South Carolina (20–1)	Louisville (19–4)	Tennessee (21–8)	Boston College (21–9)	Campbell (27–8)	Boston College (27–12)	Miami (FL) (28–16)	Miami (FL) (31–16)	Miami (FL) (34–17)	Miami (FL) (37–18)	Virginia (45–12)	Indiana State (45–17)	11.
12.	North Carolina	North Carolina (2–1)	Oklahoma State (4–3)	East Carolina (7–3)	Oklahoma State (14–3)	Tennessee (15–6)	UCLA (16–5)	East Carolina (20–8)	Kentucky (27–5)	Louisville (26–9)	East Carolina (29–11)	West Virginia (33–11)	West Virginia (36–12)	Vanderbilt (35–16)	Virginia (44–11)	Campbell (44–13)	Oregon (41–22)	12.
13.	Maryland	Maryland (2–1)	North Carolina (4–3)	Oklahoma State (8–3)	UCLA (12–3)	Ole Miss (14–6)	North Carolina (18–6)	North Carolina (20–8)	North Carolina (22–10)	Kentucky (28–7)	Virginia (32–9)	Campbell (31–10)	Campbell (36–10)	South Carolina (37–14)	Tennessee (38–18)	Southern Miss (41–17)	South Carolina (42–21)	13.
14.	Virginia Tech	Virginia Tech (2–1)	Louisville (6–1)	North Carolina (9–3)	Virginia (14–1)	Texas Tech (18–4)	Boston College (17–5)	Campbell (22–4)	Campbell (24–6)	Texas (26–12)	Texas Tech (29–13)	East Carolina (31–13)	East Carolina (34–14)	Campbell (39–11)	Campbell (41–13)	Oregon State (39–18)	Texas (42–22)	14.
15.	TCU	Oklahoma State (1–2)	Texas A&M (4–3)	Texas A&M (7–4)	Texas A&M (12–4)	North Carolina (15–5)	Campbell (19–3)	Florida Gulf Coast (23–5)	Florida Gulf Coast (26–6)	UConn (26–9)	Kentucky (30–9)	Oregon State (30–13)	Oregon State (33–14)	East Carolina (38–14)	East Carolina (41–15)	East Carolina (45–17)	Duke (39–24)	15.
16.	Louisville	Louisville (3–0)	Florida State (6–1)	UCLA (9–2)	South Carolina (16–1)	Boston College (14–3)	Florida Gulf Coast (21–4)	Oklahoma State (22–7)	Tennessee (22–10)	Texas Tech (25–12)	Miami (FL) (25–15)	Dallas Baptist (34–10)	Clemson (31–17)	Duke (34–16)	Southern Miss (37–16)	Oklahoma State (41–18)	Arkansas (43–18)	16.
17.	UCLA	UCLA (3–0)	UCLA (5–2)	Virginia (11–0)	Virginia Tech (12–4)	Miami (FL) (14–6)	Oklahoma State (20–5)	Coastal Carolina (18–7)	Coastal Carolina (20–9)	Miami (FL) (22–13)	Arizona State (27–12)	Oregon (30–13)	Kentucky (33–13)	Dallas Baptist (40–12)	Dallas Baptist (42–13)	TCU (37–22)	Kentucky (40–21)	17.
18.	Southern Miss	Southern Miss (3–0)	Maryland (3–4)	Alabama (12–0)	North Carolina (12–5)	Campbell (15–3)	Kentucky (21–3)	Louisville (21–6)	Oklahoma State (23–10)	North Carolina (24–12)	West Virginia (29–11)	Tennessee (30–14)	Dallas Baptist (36–12)	Tennessee (35–17)	Oklahoma State (37–16)	Dallas Baptist (45–14)	Clemson (44–19)	18.
19.	Virginia	Virginia (3–0)	Virginia (7–0)	NC State (12–0)	Campbell (12–2)	Florida Gulf Coast (16–4)	Coastal Carolina (14–7)	UConn (20–6)	Texas (23–10)	Arizona State (25–10)	Dallas Baptist (31–9)	Boston College (29–14)	Maryland (33–16)	Kentucky (35–15)	Auburn (33–19–1)	Maryland (41–19)	Vanderbilt (42–20)	19.
20.	Alabama	Alabama (3–0)	Alabama (8–0)	South Carolina (11–1)	Florida Gulf Coast (14–3)	Oklahoma State (16–5)	UConn (16–5)	Miami (FL) (19–9)	UConn (22–8)	Boston College (24–11)	Duke (27–12)	Arizona State (29–15)	Boston College (30–16)	Maryland (35–18)	Texas (38–18)	Auburn (34–21–1)	Miami (FL) (42–21)	20.
21.	NC State	NC State (3–0)	NC State (7–0)	Florida State (8–3)	Florida State (11–4)	Texas A&M (14–6)	Texas (18–7)	Texas (20–9)	Texas Tech (22–10)	Oregon State (24–11)	Louisville (26–13)	Virginia (35–11)	Virginia (37–11)	Virginia (41–11)	West Virginia (39–16)	Tennessee (38–19)	Coastal Carolina (42–21)	21.
22.	Miami (FL)	Miami (FL) (2–1)	Miami (FL) (7–1)	Southern Miss (8–3)	Texas Tech (14–3)	Missouri (16–3)	Texas Tech (18–7)	Texas Tech (20–9)	UCLA (19–8–1)	UCLA (21–10–1)	Oregon State (26–13)	UTSA (33–11)	UTSA (36–12)	Boston College (32–16)	Boston College (34–17)	Alabama (40–19)	Campbell (46–15)	22.
23.	South Carolina	South Carolina (3–0)	South Carolina (8–0)	Iowa (9–1)	NC State (14–2)	Kentucky (18–2)	Miami (FL) (15–9)	UCLA (16–8)	USC (20–10–1)	Oregon (24–10)	Oregon (26–12)	Maryland (30–15)	Tennessee (32–16)	Southern Miss (35–15)	Maryland (37–19)	Indiana State (42–15)	Oregon State (41–20)	23.
24.	Texas Tech	Texas Tech (4–0)	Texas Tech (8–0)	Campbell (8–2)	Alabama (15–2)	West Virginia (15–4)	West Virginia (18–6)	West Virginia (21–7)	Arizona State (23–9)	Southern Miss (22–12)	Tennessee (26–14)	Cal State Fullerton (26–13)	Oregon (31–16)	Washington (32–14)	Alabama (38–17)	Oregon (37–20)	East Carolina (47–19)	24.
25.	Oregon	Oregon (4–0)	Southern Miss (5–2)	Oregon State (9–2)	Southern Miss (10–5)	Grand Canyon (14–5)	Iowa (19–3)	Oregon (18–7)	TCU (20–12)	UTSA (28–8)	UTSA (30–10)	Northeastern (35–7)	Southern Miss (32–15)	Oklahoma State (35–15)	Kentucky (36–17)	Texas A&M (36–25)	Dallas Baptist (47–16)	25.
	Preseason Jan 17	Week 1 Feb 20	Week 2 Feb 27	Week 3 Mar 6	Week 4 Mar 13	Week 5 Mar 20	Week 6 Mar 27	Week 7 Apr 3	Week 8 Apr 10	Week 9 Apr 17	Week 10 Apr 24	Week 11 May 1	Week 12 May 8	Week 13 May 15	Week 14 May 22	Week 15 May 30	Final Jun 27	
		None	Dropped: No. 25 Oregon	Dropped: No. 18 Maryland; No. 22 Miami (FL); No. 24 Texas Tech	Dropped: No. 23 Iowa; No. 25 Oregon State	Dropped: No. 11 TCU; No. 17 Virginia Tech; No. 21 Florida State; No. 23 NC State; No. 24 Alabama; No. 25 Southern Miss	Dropped: No. 13 Ole Miss; No. 21 Texas A&M; No. 22 Missouri; No. 25 Grand Canyon	Dropped: No. 25 Iowa	Dropped: No. 20 Miami (FL); No. 24 West Virginia; No. 25 Oregon	Dropped: No. 15 Florida Gulf Coast; No. 16 Tennessee; No. 18 Oklahoma State; No. 23 USC; No. 25 TCU	Dropped: No. 14 Texas; No. 18 North Carolina; No. 22 UCLA; No. 24 Southern Miss	Dropped: No. 14 Texas Tech; No. 15 Kentucky; No. 21 Louisville	Dropped: No. 20 Arizona State; No. 24 Cal State Fullerton; No. 25 Northeastern	Dropped: No. 22 UTSA; No. 24 Oregon	Dropped: No. 13 South Carolina; No. 16 Duke; No. 24 Washington	Dropped: No. 20 Texas; No. 21 West Virginia; No. 22 Boston College; No. 25 Kentucky	Dropped: No. 10 UConn; No. 16 Oklahoma State; No. 19 Maryland; No. 20 Auburn; No. 25 Texas A&M	
