= Tennessee Volunteers =

University of Tennessee athletic teams

Tennessee Volunteers and Lady Volunteers
- University: University of Tennessee
- Nickname: Volunteers (Vols)
- NCAA: Division I (FBS)
- Conference: SEC
- Athletic director: Danny White
- Location: Knoxville, Tennessee
- Varsity teams: 20 (9 men's and 11 women's)
- Football stadium: Neyland Stadium
- Basketball arena: Thompson-Boling Arena
- Baseball stadium: Lindsey Nelson Stadium
- Softball stadium: Sherri Parker Lee Stadium
- Soccer stadium: Regal Soccer Stadium
- Aquatics center: Allan Jones Intercollegiate Aquatic Center
- Golf course: Mack and Jonnie Day Golf Facility
- Rowing venue: Tennessee Boat House, Tennessee River
- Tennis venue: Barksdale Stadium
- Outdoor track and field venue: Tom Black Track at LaPorte Stadium
- Volleyball arena: Thompson-Boling Arena
- Colors: Orange, white, and smokey gray
- Mascot: Smokey
- Fight song: Down the Field (official); Rocky Top (unofficial); Fight Vols, Fight (official)
- Cheer: “Go Vols” “Go Big Orange”
- Website: utsports.com
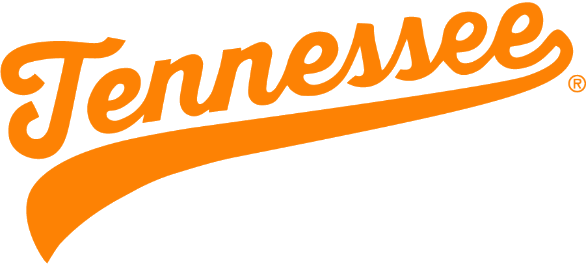

Team NCAA championships
- 17

SEC logo in Tennessee's colors

The Tennessee Volunteers and Lady Volunteers are the 20 male and female varsity intercollegiate athletics programs that represent the University of Tennessee in Knoxville, Tennessee. The Volunteers compete in Division I of the National Collegiate Athletic Association (NCAA) as a member of the Southeastern Conference (SEC). In January 2021, Danny White was introduced as the Volunteers' Director of Athletics.

Men's teams are called the Volunteers (often shortened to "Vols") and women's teams are called the Lady Volunteers ("Lady Vols"). These names come from the nickname of Tennessee, The Volunteer State.

== Overview ==
The Tennessee Volunteers have competed in the Southeastern Conference since its inception in 1932 and have consistently been at the top. The Vols have adopted a tradition for competing in every sport often resulting in many teams being ranked in the top 25. Tennessee has been known for its football and women's basketball programs that have both featured several famous coaches including Robert Neyland and Pat Summitt. Tennessee's football team won the first ever BCS National Championship Game and also represents the 9th winningest program in the NCAA. Tennessee women's basketball team won the 2007 and 2008 National Championships earning Pat Summitt her eighth NCAA national title, which was at the time the most in college basketball. Overall Tennessee has won 158 regular season SEC championships, 41 SEC tournament championships, and 23 national championships in women's basketball, football, men's indoor and outdoor track & field, women's indoor and outdoor track & field, and men's swimming & diving. The only Tennessee sport that does not compete in the SEC is women's rowing which competes in Big 12. The rowing team formerly competed in Conference USA. They won the 2010 Conference USA rowing championship.

Many of Tennessee's traditions come from the early 20th century. Tennessee's orange and white colors were selected by Charles Moore, a member of the first football team in 1891. They were later approved by a student body vote. The colors were chosen because of the common American daisy which grew on The Hill, an area of campus surrounding UT's most notable building, Ayres Hall. The orange color is distinct to the school, dubbed "UT Orange", and has been offered by The Home Depot for sale as a paint, licensed by the university. Home games at Neyland Stadium have been described as a "sea of Orange" due to the large number of fans wearing the school color; the moniker Big Orange, as in "Go Big Orange!", derives from the usage of UT Orange.

Tennessee adopted the name Volunteers, or more commonly Vols, because of a now-official nickname that Tennessee received due to their propensity to Volunteer for the army in large numbers at the outbreak of many early American wars. The origin of the name comes from the 1,500 Volunteers from Tennessee that made the trek to New Orleans to help Andrew Jackson in its Defense during the War of 1812. Then Davy Crockett and other Tennesseans Volunteered to help fight for the Republic of Texas in their war of Independence, and was further reinforced when, during the outbreak of the Mexican American War, U.S. President James K. Polk called for 2,600 Volunteers from Tennessee, however, over 30,000 men signed up instead. UT Football players would adopt the name as their unofficial nickname in 1891, and it would greatly grow in popularity when again Tennesseans Volunteered en masse to fight in the Spanish American War in 1896. The name was cemented after UT's 1902 victory against Georgia Tech when local sports media started using it. However, it wouldn't be until 1905 when the school adopted the Volunteers as its official nickname, as prior to then the athletic teams used the nicknames Tennesseans or Varsity to varying degrees.

The iconized 'T' that represents the men's Tennessee sports programs was introduced by Doug Dickey and then re-designed by Johnny Majors. The once-separate men and women's programs allowed the women's sports to adopt a separate identity apart from the men's by not only referring to themselves as the Lady Vols but also adopting the color Columbia Blue into their uniforms and adopting a different logo with a different 'T' that represents the Lady Vols. The famous Smokey mascot was introduced in 1953 by Rev. Bill Brooks who entered his prize-winning blue tick coon hound, "Brooks' Blue Smokey," in a contest at halftime of the Mississippi State game that season. The dogs were lined up on the old cheerleaders' ramp at Shields-Watkins Field and each dog was introduced over the loudspeaker and the student body cheered for their favorite, with "Blue Smokey" being the last hound introduced. When his name was called, he barked. The students cheered and Smokey threw his head back and barked again. This kept going until the stadium was in an uproar and UT had found its mascot, Smokey. The widely known and unique tradition of running through the 'T' on game days began in 1965 when Doug Dickey moved the teams' bench to the east side and had the team enter and simply turning around back to their sideline through a giant 'T' performed by the Pride of the Southland Band. One of the biggest and most popular trademarks and most recognized sights of Tennessee sports is the orange and white checkerboard end zones that was introduced in the 1960s and reappeared in the 1980s, inspired by the checkerboard design that Ayres Hall features on its outside brick work, and can also be found in the Thompson-Boling Arena on the basketball court.

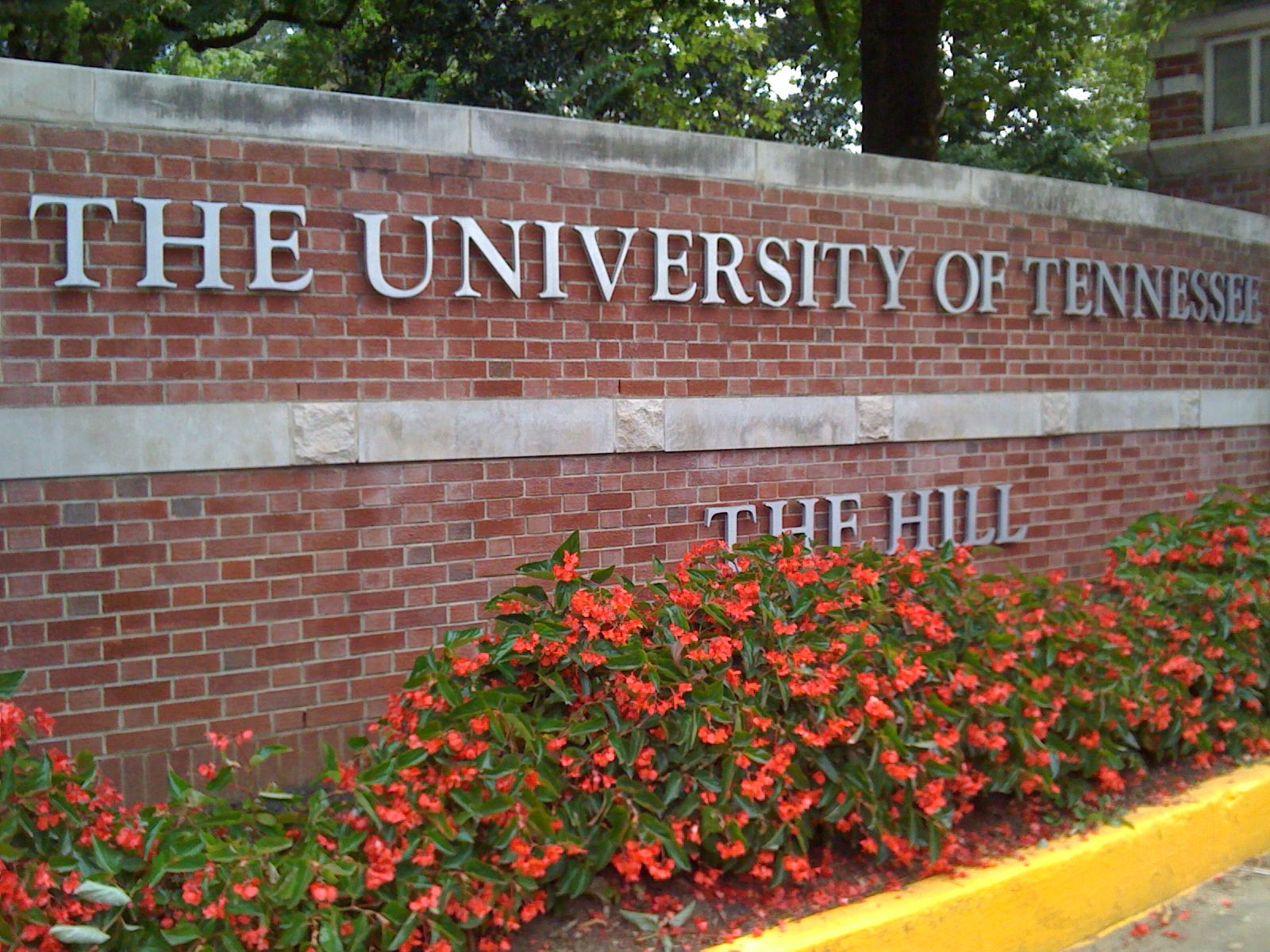
UT's entrance at The Hill

The Hill is another aspect about UT because since the 19th century, The Hill has been associated with higher education in the state of Tennessee. The university, founded in 1794 as Blount College, moved to The Hill in 1828 and quickly grew around it. The main part of UT's old campus stands on this rise above the north shore of the Tennessee River. Neyland Stadium sprawls at the base of The Hill, between it and the River. The Vol Navy is a distinctive feature of game day because the University of Tennessee, the University of Pittsburgh, and the University of Washington are adjacent to major bodies of water. Today, approximately 200 boats of various sizes form a floating tailgate party on the river every fall, and boats begin arriving days in advance of home games.

The "Pride of the Southland" has represented the state of Tennessee for the last 50 years at eleven Presidential Inaugurations, from Dwight D. Eisenhower to Barack Obama's first inauguration. The band has also made more than 40 bowl appearances, including the Sugar Bowl, Astro Bluebonnet Bowl, Citrus Bowl, Gator Bowl, Hall of Fame Bowl, Garden State Bowl, Sun Bowl, Liberty Bowl, Peach Bowl, Fiesta Bowl, Cotton Bowl, Orange Bowl, and the Rose Bowl. One of the most notable college fighting songs in the country is the beloved Rocky Top, the unofficial fighting song for the Vols, which has become a ritual for every sport at UT to play at games.

=== Sports sponsored ===
Men's sports	Women's sports
Baseball	Basketball
Basketball	Cross country
Cross country	Golf
Football	Rowing
Golf	Soccer
Swimming & diving	Softball
Tennis	Swimming & diving
Track and field^{†}	Tennis
	Track and field^{†}
	Volleyball
† – Track and field includes both indoor and outdoor.

=== Baseball ===
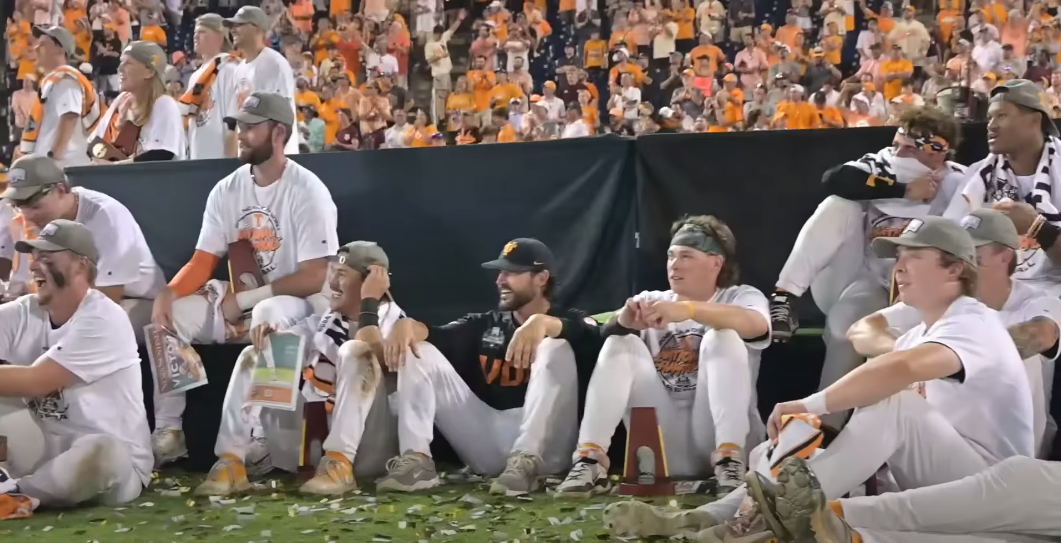
Members of the 2024 Volunteers baseball team after winning the 2024 College World Series

The University of Tennessee baseball team has predominantly had a fairly successful program reaching the NCAA Tournament nine times and the NCAA College World Series seven times (1951, 1995, 2001, 2005, 2021, 2023, and 2024). They have produced players such as Todd Helton, Joe Randa, Chris Burke, and the number one overall pick in the 2006 Major League Baseball draft, Luke Hochevar. In 2011 Tennessee hired Dave Serrano to replace Todd Raleigh who finished the season with a losing record including one of the worst SEC records in Tennessee history. Serrano, who was an assistant coach at Tennessee from 1995 to 1996, came to UT with a 289–139–1 (.675) in seven seasons as a Division I head coach. Serrano is also one of 11 coaches that have managed to take two different schools to the College World Series. Serrano officially resigned after the 2017 baseball season. Former Athletic director John Currie introduced Tony Vitello as the new head coach on June 7, 2017.

=== Basketball ===
==== Men's program ====
The head coach of the men's basketball program is Rick Barnes. The Volunteers used to be coached by Donnie Tyndall. Tyndall was fired after NCAA violations at his former school Southern Miss. Tyndall was at UT for 1 year where he went 16–16. Before Tyndall, Counzo Martin was head coach of the Volunteers, who left to go to Cal after a Sweet 16 season in 2014. Martin is believed to have left due too many fans calling for his firing earlier in the season. Before Martin, there was Bruce Pearl who restored the men's program and brought it to national prominence until he was fired in 2011 for multiple violations against the NCAA. Through Pearl's guidance, the men's program was revitalized and claimed the 2005–2006 SEC East Title and closed the season with a 22–8 record and an NCAA Tournament berth. In 2007, the Vols made the NCAA tourney for the second straight year, making it to the Sweet Sixteen. In 2008 the Vols claimed their first outright SEC regular season championship in 41 years. One of the highlights of the 2008 season came when UT knocked off number 1 Memphis, who was then undefeated, to claim the number one ranking in the nation. In men's basketball, the most important rivalries are with Kentucky, Vanderbilt, Florida and cross-state rival Memphis. In the 2009–2010 season, the Volunteers made their first ever elite eight appearance. Notable Tennessee basketball players who went on to NBA careers include Allan Houston and Bernard King. The Volunteers had two players, Jarnell Stokes and Jordan McCrae selected in the 2014 NBA Draft.

==== Women's program ====
The Lady Vols are led by Coach Kim Caldwell. Tennessee has historically had one of the strongest women's basketball teams at the college level, having won eight NCAA Division I titles (1987, 1989, 1991, 1996, 1997, 1998, 2007, 2008), the 2nd most in women's college basketball history (UConn has 12). The Tennessee Volunteers women's basketball was previously led by Kellie Harper, who played for Pat Summitt, the most winningest basketball coach in NCAA history, having won 1,098 games—more than any other basketball coach at her retirement. Coach Summitt boasted a 100 percent graduation rate for all players who finish their career at UT. Former Tennessee Lady Vols basketball star Candace Parker went No. 1 in the WNBA draft. Tennessee and Summitt also have a rivalry with the University of Connecticut in women's basketball. These two schools have consistently fought great games against each other in recent years, occasionally with the national championship on the line. The regular season rivalry games ended in 2007 when Tennessee decided to not sign a contract continuing them, due to a recruiting dispute. The main women's basketball rivals for Tennessee within the conference are Georgia, Vanderbilt, and LSU. The Lady Vols' first-round loss to Ball State in the 2009 NCAA tournament ended their record of having made the Sweet Sixteen of every NCAA Tournament since its inception in 1982. Coach Summitt was honored with the Arthur Ashe Courage Award at the 2012 ESPYs.

=== Cross country ===
==== Men's program ====
The Tennessee Vols men's cross country team has won 25 Southeastern Conference (SEC) Championships, 10 NCAA regionals, qualified for 34 NCAA Championships, and won 1 national championship.

==== Women's program ====
The Tennessee Lady Vols women's cross country team has claimed 5 SEC Championships, 6 NCAA/AIAW regional crowns, qualified for 3 AIAW Championships, and appeared in 10 NCAA Championships. Their all-time best finish was when they placed 4th in the nation.

=== Football ===
5 min video of the open of a football game

Prior to the 2024 season, Tennessee competed in the SEC's Eastern Division, along with Florida, Georgia, Kentucky, Missouri, South Carolina, and Vanderbilt, and has longstanding football rivalries with the majority of them. However, the Vols' most intense and bitter traditional rivalry is with the Alabama Crimson Tide. The teams battle every year in the Third Saturday in October, though the game is now usually held on the fourth Saturday in October. The Vols' Super Bowl champions Peyton Manning and Reggie White are among the most famous NFL athletes to start their careers at the University of Tennessee. Todd Helton also played football, in addition to baseball, as a quarterback.

=== Golf ===
==== Men's program ====
The Tennessee men's golf team has won 3 Southeastern Conference Championships. The current coach for the Vols is Jim Kelson whose steady hand has the Tennessee men's golf program thriving.

The Vols are coming off a 12th-place national finish after advancing to NCAA regional competition for a school-best 10th consecutive season. And already this year, UT has captured the prestigious Carpet Capital Collegiate for the first time in school history and the Bank of Tennessee Intercollegiate in a scorecard playoff. Kelson was hired in June 1998 and made

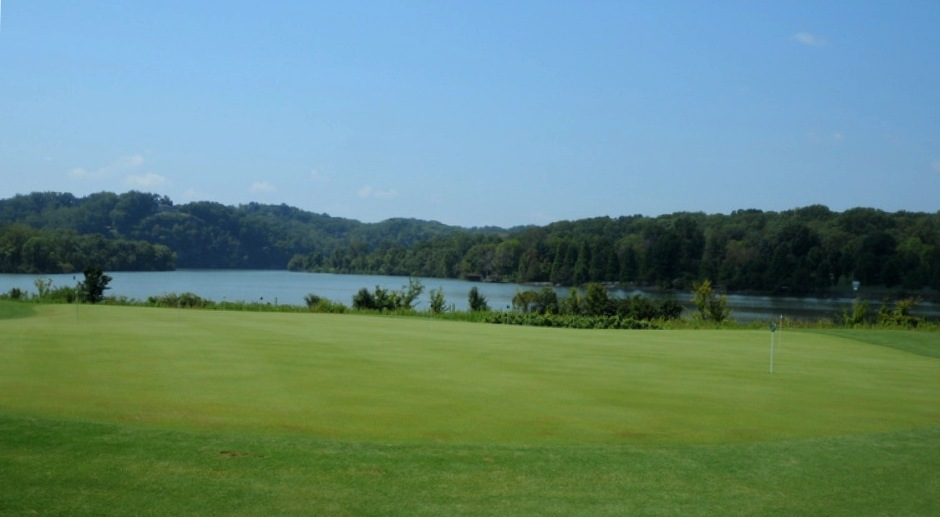
Mack and Jonnie Day Golf Facility course

almost immediate inroads toward success. The Vols missed the NCAAs that initial season but have been a regular participant ever since, advancing as far as the championship round four times. Kelson has been building this program from the day he arrived on campus. The Vols have won 15 tournament championships in his 11-plus seasons. Five different campaigns produced multiple tourney titles—2001–02 (three), 2004–05 (three), 2006–07 (two), 2007–08 (two). UT also claimed hardware under Kelson in the 1998–99, 2000–01, and 2005–06 seasons. Tennessee's SEC victory that year by two strokes over Alabama led to a plethora of well-deserved postseason awards. Kelson was honored with his first SEC Coach of the Year award, Philip Pettitt earned All-SEC first team honors, while Charlie Ford and Chris Paisley were named to the All-SEC second team. One of the highlights was capturing the 2007 SEC Championship, Tennessee's first league crown in 17 years. At the event, UT finished with three players in the top-10, including two tied for second.

Last season, Kelson guided the Vols to a top-five team finish in seven of their 12 tournaments played for the highest number of top-five showings in his coaching career. Four runner-up finishes—the NCAA Northeast Regional included—two thirds and a fifth-place result were testament to Tennessee's steady play throughout the season. Tennessee then challenged for a spot in the NCAA quarterfinal round of match-play but fell just a few strokes shy.

==== Women's ====
The women's golf team is led by Judi Pavón. Over the last decade, the Lady Volunteer golf program has been a constant force in the Southeastern Conference and on the national level under the guidance of Judi Pavón, the current National Golf Coaches Association President. Since Pavón became head coach in 2000, the Big Orange has captured 13 tournament titles, competed at seven NCAA Championships, and been a constant presence in top 25 rankings.

Individually, Lady Vols have captured 14 All-America awards, 28 All-SEC nods and 21 NGCA Academic All-America citations under the tutelage of Pavón. In the "decade of success" with Pavón, the Orange and White have continued UT's streak of finishing above .500 in head-to-head matchups and competing at the NCAA Regional Championships every season.

=== Rowing ===
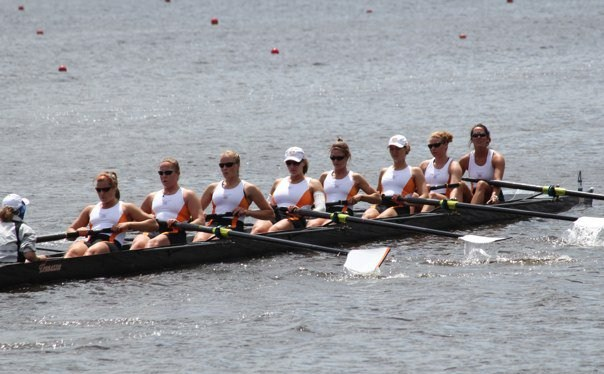
Lady Vols rowing in the Tennessee River

The Volunteers rowing team participates with the Big 12 and is coached by Lisa Glenn. During her 12 years at the helm of the University of Tennessee women's rowing team, Head Coach Lisa Glenn has helped the 14-year-old program mature into a national power. Now in her 13th season, Glenn has led the Vols to seven appearances at the NCAA Championships, including three consecutive full-team selections in 2006, 2007, 2008, and 2010. Glenn helped propel the Lady Vols to new heights in 2008, leading the Orange and White to its first-ever Conference-USA rowing championship. Glenn was also named C-USA Coach of the Year for her efforts in helping Tennessee achieve this historic feat. Under Glenn's tutelage, senior Laura Miller was named the C-USA rower of the year, while three other Lady Vols captured All-Conference honors.

At the 2008 NCAA Championships, the three-time Collegiate Rowing Coaches Association South Region Coach of the Year guided the Orange and White to its first-ever appearance in a grand final, as the second varsity eight took fifth to record UT's best event finish at the NCAA regatta. The team has excelled under Glenn's watch at the sport's largest event, the Head of the Charles Regatta, held every fall in Boston, Mass. Glenn's entries in the Club 8+ race have captured five golds, including three consecutive victories in the event from 2005 to 2007. The Championship 8+ crews have made their mark over the years as well, claiming top-10 finishes three times, and top-15 marks seven times, including a program-best fifth-place finish in 2007. In 2009, the Champ 8+ from Tennessee finished 12th out of 34 overall, placing it in the top eight among universities.

=== Soccer ===
The Tennessee Volunteers women's soccer team competes in the SEC and has won four conference championships. The Vols used to be coached by Angela Kelly, who resigned her job on December 17, 2011, to become head coach at the University of Texas.

Under Kelly's guidance the then-Lady Vols soccer program became quite the Southeastern Conference

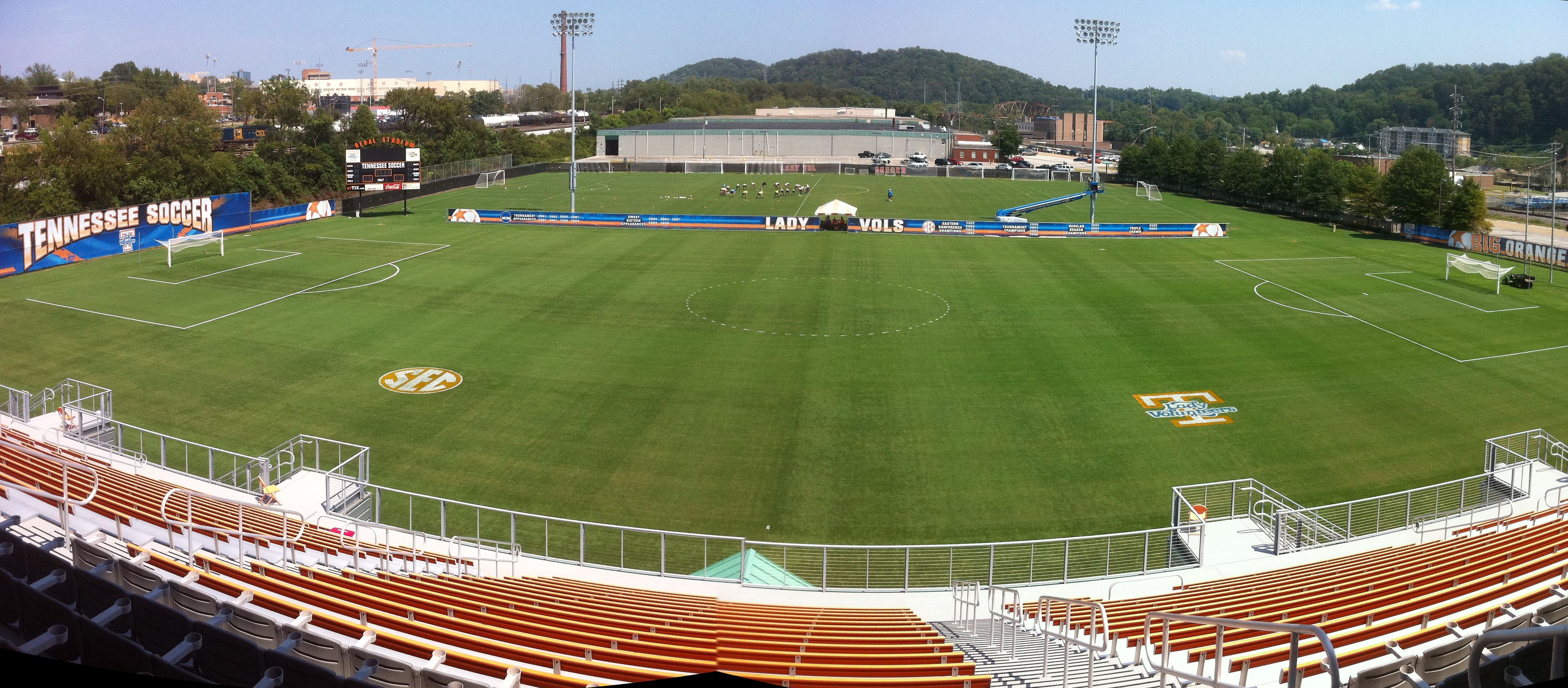
Regal Stadium field

powerhouse and a force on the collegiate soccer landscape. Before her promotion to head coach, the Big Orange had never advanced to the NCAA Tournament, claimed an SEC Tournament match, collected any of the league's hardware or been ranked in the final poll of any season. After taking over the program, Kelly took home four consecutive SEC Eastern Division banners, three straight SEC regular-season crowns, and four SEC Tournament titles between 2000 and 2008. The ex-Lady Vol boss also owns three SEC Coach of the Year trophies which she collected each year from 2003 to 2005.

Over the previous nine years, Kelly combined strong recruiting, top talent, excellent leadership and team chemistry to create a Tennessee program that made Lady Vol history and collected numerous accolades, both as a team and individually. Kelly compiled a 127–59–16 overall record since taking over at Rocky Top, leading the team to four SEC Eastern Division titles, three regular season championships and four SEC Tournament crowns. In her nine years at the helm, Kelly's teams reached eight NCAA Tournaments, making five Sweet 16 appearances. Kelly's squads were 10–7–2 in the NCAA Tournament and were nearly unbeatable at home, winning nearly 86 percent of the time in Knoxville.

On January 26, 2012, Dave Hart announced that Brian Pensky would take over as head coach for the University of Tennessee women's soccer program. Pensky had coached at the University of Maryland where he was named the 2010 Soccer America National Coach of the Year for guiding Maryland to the No. 1 overall seed in the 2010 NCAA Soccer Tournament.

=== Softball ===
In recent years the women's softball team has gained notoriety, reaching the Women's College World Series a total of four times (three consecutive years in a row). They placed third in 2005, 2006, and 2010 and second in 2007. In 2010 the Lady Vols made headlines as they reached the WCWS with a low 15th seed and advanced to 2–2 in the World Series just one victory short of

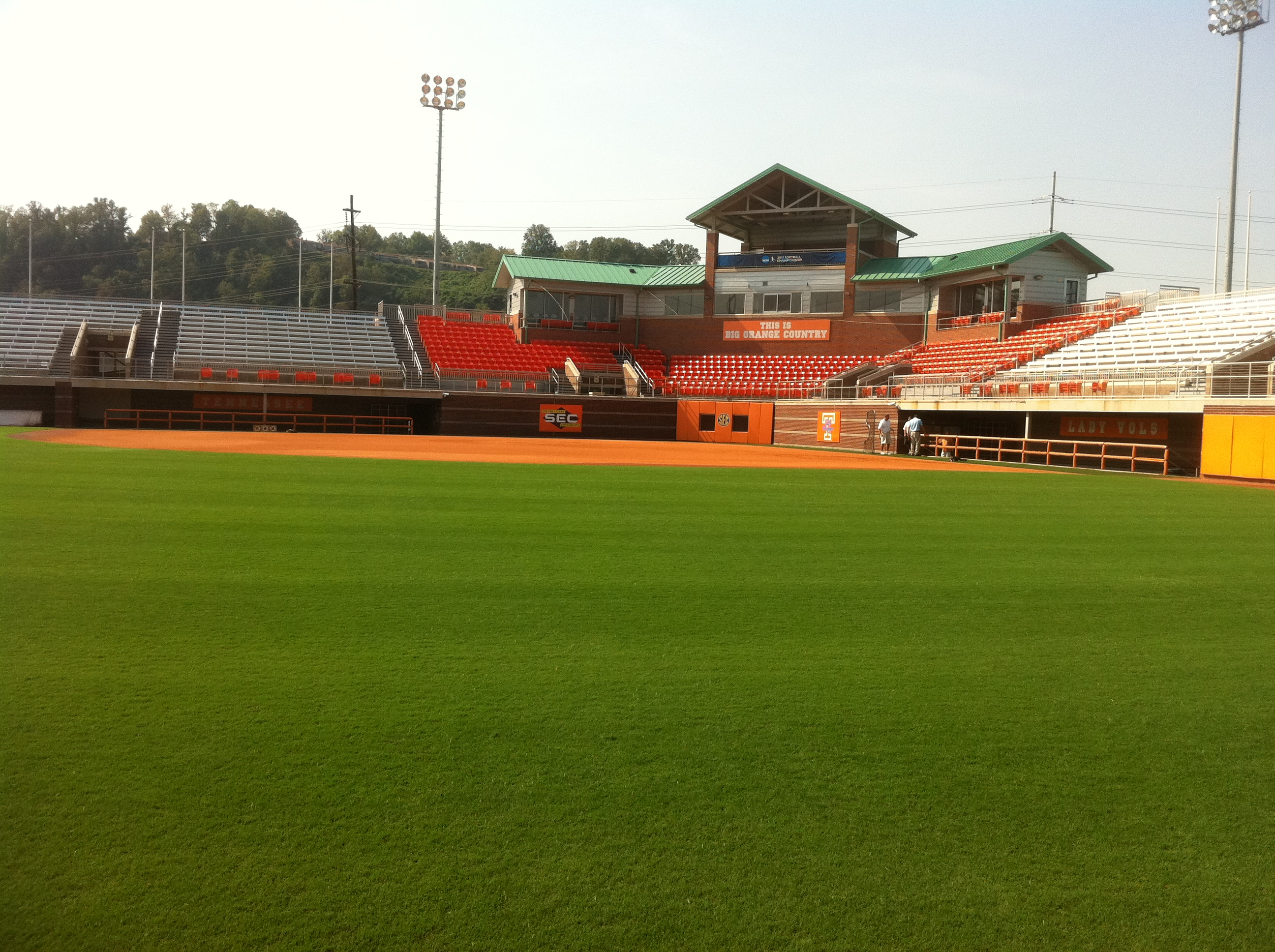
Sherri Parker Lee Stadium

a berth in the Women's College World Series best-of-three title round, but lost 5–2 to No. 3 Arizona. The four appearances in the Women's College World Series have never resulted in the Lady Vols finishing lower than third place in the WCWS. Former pitcher Monica Abbott is the all-time career NCAA leader in strikeouts (2,440), shutouts (112), wins (189) and innings pitched (1448.0). The Salinas, California, native won the U.S. Softball National Player of the Year award and the Honda Award for Softball in 2007. She was also honored by the Women's Sports Foundation as its Team Sport Player of the Year ahead of nominees including Kristine Lilly and Lauren Jackson. In 2011, the Lady Vols returned much of the roster from the previous season's Women's College World Series team. Tennessee remained ranked within the top 10 for most of the season and led the SEC Eastern Division until being swept by Florida in the final week of conference play. The Lady Vols later defeated the Georgia Bulldogs 6–5 in the SEC tournament championship game, winning the tournament for the first time in five years.

Recent National Fastpitch Coaches Association (NFCA) All-Americans from the University of Tennessee include Abbott (2004–07), India Chiles (2007), Lindsay Schutzler (2005–07), Tonya Callahan (2006–07), Kristi Durant (2005–06) and Sarah Fekete (2005–06).

=== Swimming and diving ===
==== Men's program ====
The Tennessee Vols swimming & diving team has won 10 Southeastern Conference Championships, and 1 national championship in 1978. Legendary coach Ray Bussard revitalized the program during his 21-season tenure from 1968 to 1988, winning 8 SEC titles and posting 10 NCAA-Top 10 seasons. All-time the Vols have 27 NCAA Top-10 marks and 13 Top-5 finishes in addition to 2 NCAA Runner-up seasons. They have been coached by Matt Kredich, the former women's only coach, since 2013.

==== Women's program ====
The Lady Volunteers swimming and diving team has won 2 Southeastern Conference Championships in 2020 and 2022. All-time the Lady Vols have posted 11 NCAA Top-10 finishes and 2 Top-5 seasons. They have been coached by Matt Kredich since 2005.

=== Tennis ===
==== Men's program ====
The Tennessee Volunteers men's tennis team has won 9 Southeastern Conference Championships, 4 SEC tournaments, and finished as national runner-up three times. The Vols have 8 NCAA Semifinal appearances all-time, most recently in 2022. They have been coached by former player and ATP professional Chris Woodruff since 2018.

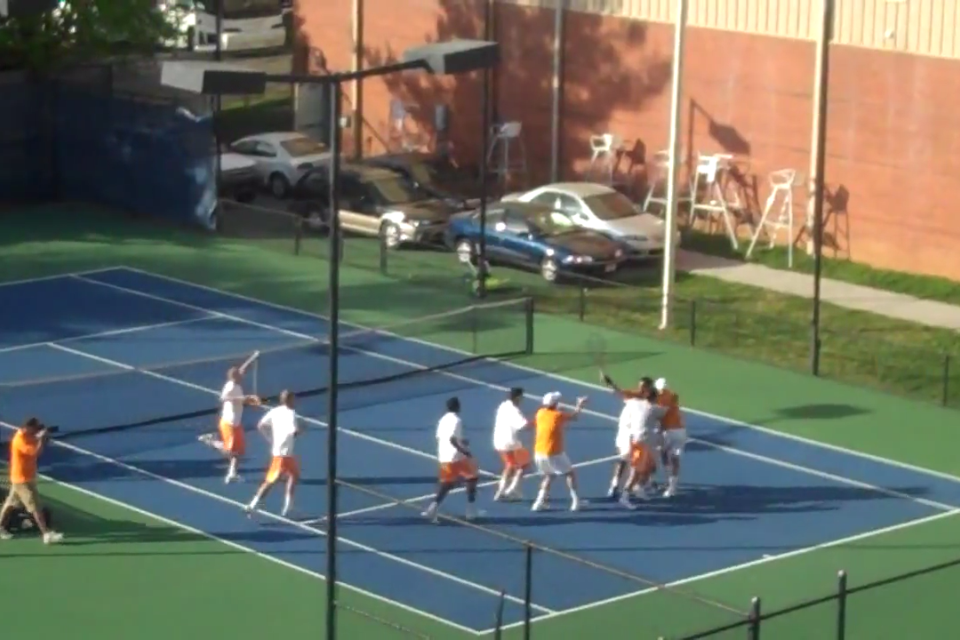
The Tennessee Vols tennis team finishing a match at Barksdale Stadium

==== Women's program ====
The Lady Vol tennis team has qualified for 29 NCAA tournaments since their founding in 1977, with their best tournament result coming as an NCAA Semifinal appearance in 2002. The program is notable for being one of only two Tennessee teams (women's golf) to never win an SEC title, finishing 2nd in the SEC regular season on 5 occasions and falling in the SEC tournament final 4 times. They have been led by former Lady-Vol alum and All-American Alison Ojeda since 2017.

=== Track and field – indoor ===
==== Men's program ====
The Tennessee Volunteers men's indoor track & field team have won 18 SEC Championships as well as 1 national championship in 2002. Duane Ross, who assumed his position prior to the 2022–2023 year, serves as the director for both the men's and women's track & field teams.

==== Women's program ====
The Vols' women's indoor track & field team have won 4 SEC Championships as well as 2 national championships in 2005 and 2009.

=== Track and field – outdoor ===
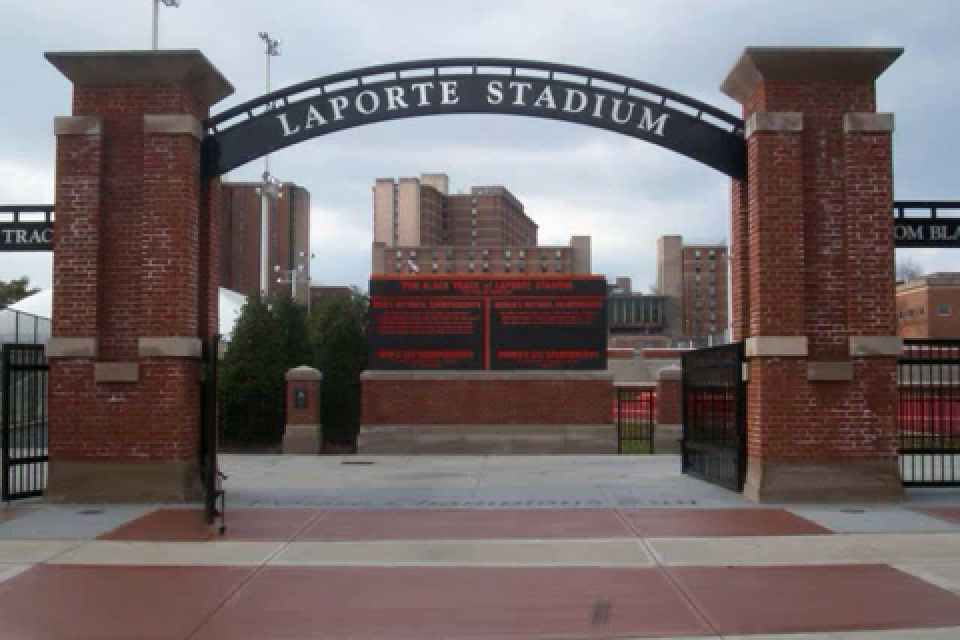
LaPorte Stadium

==== Men's program ====
The Tennessee Vols men's outdoor track & field team have won 25 Southeastern Conference Championships as well as 3 national titles in 1974, 1991, and 2001.

==== Women's program ====
The Tennessee women's outdoor track & field team have won 4 SEC Championships and 1 AIAW national championship in 1981.

=== Volleyball ===
The Volunteers volleyball team have won 4 SEC championships. Two-time National Coach of the Year Rob Patrick has developed a tradition of excellence since coming to Tennessee 13 years ago. Following his arrival at Rocky Top, Patrick has become one of the nation's top coaches and helped the Vols attain levels of success never before reached in Knoxville, as evidenced by NCAA Tournament berths in five of the last six years, including a run to the Final Four in 2005.

With an impressive 24–8 record in 2009, the Big Orange now has won 20 or more matches in six of the last eight campaigns and has done so seven times in a 10-year span. Prior to Patrick's arrival at UT in 1997, the then-Lady Vols last recorded a 20-win season in 1988. His nine-year stretch of winning seasons from 1998 to 2006 marked the longest-such run in program history, topping the previous high of seven, set from 1978 to 1984. The Big Orange finished the 2009 campaign with a school-record 16 wins in SEC action, finishing in a tie for second before earning its fifth bid to the NCAA Tournament in the past six seasons where it reached the second round. Following a tough 2007 season, the Lady Vols regrouped to post the third-largest turnaround in NCAA Division I in 2008. Under Patrick's direction, UT doubled its win total from 11 to 22 and returned to the NCAA Tournament after a one-year absence. For his efforts, Patrick was named the American Volleyball Coaches Association (AVCA) South Region Coach of the Year, as well as the Southeastern Conference Coach of the Year, for the second time in his career.

During his 13-year tenure at Rocky Top, Patrick has compiled an impressive 267–143 (.651) record, and he became the program's all-time winningest coach with a 3–0 victory over Auburn on October 3, 2008. Under Patrick's guidance, eight different student-athletes have been named All-Americans on a total of 15 occasions, including Nikki Fowler who claimed honorable mention honors from the AVCA in 2008 before picking up the honors alongside libero Chloe Goldman in 2009. Prior to those awards, the last players to accomplish the feat were Yuliya Stoyanova and Sarah Blum who both picked up AVCA Honorable Mention accolades as well, following the 2006 campaign.

In 2005 the Vols' women's team achieved the program's first ever appearance in the NCAA Final Four and highest year-end ranking in school history. During that memorable year, the Lady Vols fought early season obstacles and compiled a 25–9 overall record, finishing sixth in the nation after falling to eventual national champion Washington in the national semifinals of the NCAA Tournament in San Antonio, Texas. Patrick was named the 2005 NCAA National Coach of the Year by VBall Magazine. The season before its run to the Final Four, Tennessee put together an equally impressive season in which it achieved a school record 32-3 record. The Lady Vols accomplished a number of goals in 2004, including winning an SEC regular-season title for the first time in school history, defeating Florida, 3–2, on the final day of the season to tie the Gators with identical 15–1 marks. Just a mere seven days later, the Orange and White made it two titles in two weeks, topping UF, once again by a 3–2 score, in the SEC Tournament championship match. A couple of weeks later, the Big Orange won a pair of NCAA Tournament matches and advanced to the Sweet 16 for the first time in 20 years. Based on the team's fast rise to prominence, Patrick was awarded both the AVCA South Region and the SEC Coach of the Year awards, as well as CVU.com National Coach of the Year honors. He was also a finalist for the AVCA National Coach of the Year award.

== Notable non-varsity sports ==
=== Rugby ===
Founded in 1970, the Tennessee rugby team plays in the Southeastern Collegiate Rugby Conference. Tennessee has been led since 2011 by head coach Marty Bradley.

In the 2011–12 season, Tennessee compiled a 6–0 regular season conference record, defeated Florida in the championship match to win the Southeast Conference title, and defeated Maryland and Florida State to advance to the program's first ever semifinal appearance in the USA Rugby National Championship playoffs. In 2013, Tennessee went 6–0 in conference play, defeated South Carolina in the Conference championship match, before losing to Central Florida in the round of 16 playoffs.

In 2015, Tennessee rode an undefeated record and #1 seed into the conference semifinals, where they defeated Florida 30–13 to advance to the conference championship on Nov 21 at the ACRC Bowl Series in Charlotte. In the final, Tennessee came from behind to defeat South Carolina 23–22 for the SCRC championship. Marty Bradley was named 2015 SCRC Coach of the Year.

Tennessee rugby has also been successful in rugby sevens. Tennessee finished sixth at the 2010 Collegiate Rugby Championship, the highest profile college rugby tournament in the US broadcast live on NBC. Tennessee won the Southeastern Collegiate Rugby Sevens Championship in 2010 and 2011.

In 2021, the Men's XV team won its record 5th SCRC championship with defeating Clemson, 26-17. They'd go on to win the College Rugby Association of America (CRAA) Division 1-AA National Championship with a 36-31 victory over Bowling Green. The program's first ever perfect season saw the Vols finished 11-0 and outscored its opponents, 373-127.

=== Lacrosse ===
Lacrosse was introduced on the campus of the University of Tennessee in 1974. The UT Men's Lacrosse team has had many successful years since the introduction of the sport. The Tennessee Men's lacrosse team are members of the MCLA (Men's Collegiate Lacrosse Association), which is a national organization of non-NCAA, college lacrosse teams. Tennessee plays in the Atlantic Lacrosse Conference (ALC), which include schools like Clemson, NC State, Liberty, Virginia Tech, West Virginia, and Pittsburgh. The team travels and plays universities from other conferences as well. University of Tennessee lacrosse has won four SELC Championships and made three appearances in the national tournament since 1993.

== Discontinued sports ==
=== Wrestling ===
The Tennessee Volunteers sponsored a varsity wrestling team from 1940 to 1986 when the program was cut because of budget constraints. In 1985, they finished a program high 8th at the NCAA wrestling championships.

=== Gymnastics ===
The University of Tennessee discontinued their women's gymnastics program in 1979.

== National championships ==
Since their beginning of intercollegiate competition, the University of Tennessee's varsity athletic teams have won 17 NCAA Team championships.

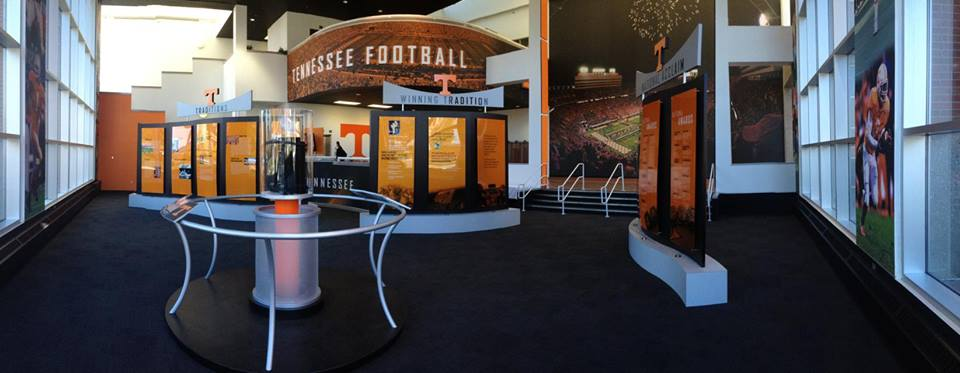
An exhibit of the Volunteers football team's accomplishments at Neyland-Thompson Sports Center. The AFCA National Championship Trophy is on show in the display case

Men's NCAA Championships

- Baseball (1): 2024
- Cross Country (1): 1972
- Indoor Track and Field (1): 2002
- Outdoor Track and Field (3): 1974 • 1991 • 2001
- Swimming and Diving (1): 1978

Women's NCAA Championships

- Basketball (8): 1987 • 1989 • 1991 • 1996 • 1997 • 1998 • 2007 • 2008
- Indoor Track and Field (2): 2005 • 2009

In addition Tennessee has 1 AIAW national championship and has claimed 6 football national championships, as awarded by a variety of selectors at the highest level (currently Division I FBS) of football, for which the NCAA has never conducted a national championship.

- Football (6): 1938 • 1940 • 1950 • 1951 • 1967 • 1998
- Outdoor Track & Field (1): 1981 (AIAW)

Men's National Runners-Up

- Baseball (1): 1951
- Indoor Track and Field (3): 1985 • 1994 • 1995
- Outdoor Track and Field (4): 1982 • 1983 • 1992 • 2002
- Swimming and Diving (2): 1973 • 1976
- Tennis (3): 1990 • 2001 • 2010

Women's National Runners-Up

- Basketball (7): 1980 (AIAW) • 1981 (AIAW) • 1984 • 1995 • 2000 • 2003 • 2004
- Indoor Track and Field (7): 1981 (AIAW) • 1982 (AIAW) • 1983 • 1984 • 1986 • 1987 • 2010
- Outdoor Track and Field (2): 1982 • 1984
- Softball (2): 2007 • 2013

The national intercollegiate sports championships listed above were sponsored by the NCAA unless otherwise noted in the footnotes.

== Facilities ==
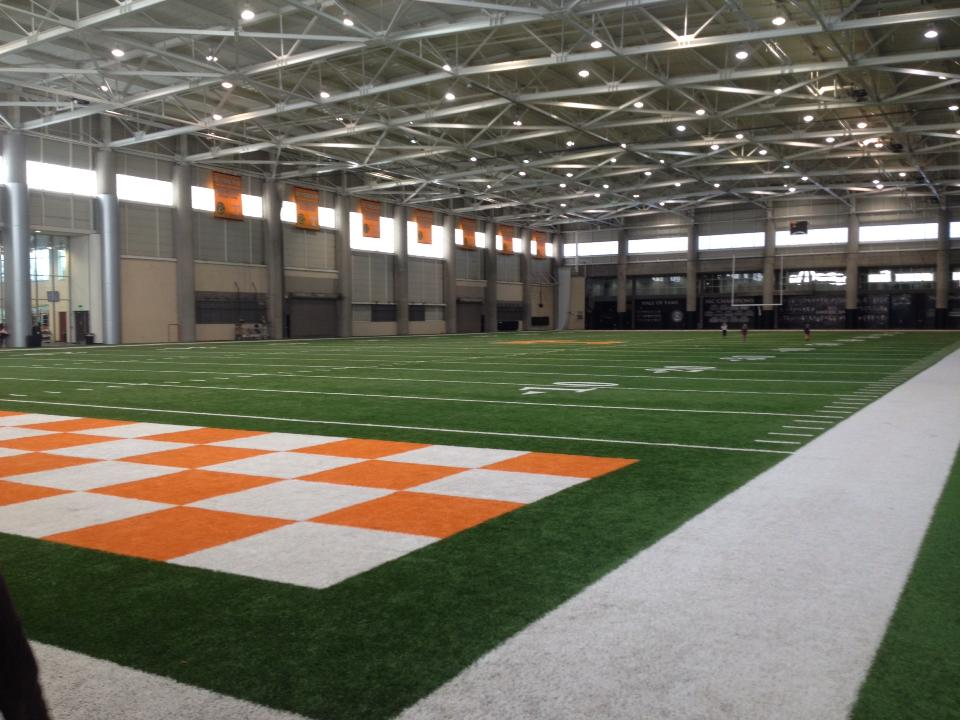
The indoor field at Neyland-Thompson Sports Center

Neyland Stadium, home to the football team, seats over 102,000 people and is the fifth-largest stadium in the world. Neyland finished undergoing renovations costing over $100 million. The Volunteers have practiced at the Neyland-Thompson Sports Center since 1989, which underwent an expansion in 2006. The Neyland-Thompson Sports Center features two exterior fields, one indoor field and provides the University of Tennessee athletes with strength and conditioning, dressing, health care, meeting, and coaching facilities. In 2013, Tennessee dedicated the Anderson Training Center and Brenda Lawson Athletic Center; a 145,000 square foot building that includes an amphitheater-style seating room, coaches offices, position meeting rooms, a dining hall, players' lounge, a barber shop, a 7,000 square-foot locker room, a 22,000 square foot, multi-level weight room, a new training room and hydrotherapy area. In 2014, the Ray and Lucy Hand Digital Studio was added on the ground floor of the Brenda Lawson Athletic Center. The studio is a state-of-the-art facility for athletic video content creation such as online video content and coaches' television shows.

The Volunteers and Lady Vols basketball teams play in Thompson-Boling Arena, the largest arena (by capacity) ever built specifically for basketball in the United States. Both basketball programs practice at the Pratt Pavilion, which besides two full-sized basketball courts, has an athletic training room, a weight room, a film study room, and a place to host recruits. The former home of both basketball teams and the Lady Vols volleyball program, Stokely Athletic Center, was demolished in 2014 to make way for new dormitories.

The Alumni Memorial Gym was another indoor athletic facility. It was built in 1934 during a construction campaign under school president James D. Hoskins, and was replaced by the Stokely Athletics Center in 1967. The facility hosted the Southeastern Conference men's basketball tournament in 1936 and 1937 and again in 1939 and 1940. It is now used as a performing arts center and seats 1,000 spectators.

The Allan Jones Intercollegiate Aquatic Center, completed in 2008, is a $30 million center that features one outdoor 50-meter pool, an indoor 50-meter pool, a new 50-meter competition pool, and a separate competition diving well featuring five platforms and six springboards. It will allow for 2,800 seats. The facility also includes a weight room, a training room, a team-meeting room, several locker rooms for the Vols, Lady Vols, and two visiting teams, seven offices for coaches, a multipurpose room, an elevated timing booth, and a renovated Swimming and Diving Hall of Fame. It was named for businessman Allan Jones of Cleveland, who gave donations for its construction.
