= 2023 Cal State Fullerton Titans baseball team =

American college baseball season

2023 Cal State Fullerton Titans baseball

Stanford Regional, 1–2
- Conference: Big West Conference
- Record: 31–22 (20–10 Big West Conference)
- Head coach: Jason Dietrich (2nd season)
- Assistant coaches: Neil Walton; Josh Belovsky; Jake Pavletich
- Home stadium: Goodwin Field

2023 Big West Conference baseball standings
	Conf.				Overall
Team	W		L	PCT	W		L	PCT
UC San Diego* ‍†‍‍	21	–	9	.700	34	–	18	.654
Cal State Northridge ‍‍‍	20	–	10	.667	34	–	17	.667
Cal State Fullerton ‍‍‍^{y}	20	–	10	.667	31	–	22	.585
UC Irvine ‍‍‍	19	–	11	.633	38	–	17	.691
UC Santa Barbara ‍‍‍	18	–	12	.600	35	–	20	.636
Hawai'i ‍‍‍	18	–	12	.600	29	–	20	.592
Long Beach State ‍‍‍	17	–	13	.567	33	–	22	.600
Cal Poly ‍‍‍	11	–	19	.367	21	–	35	.375
Cal State Bakersfield ‍‍‍	9	–	21	.300	18	–	34	.346
UC Davis ‍‍‍	7	–	23	.233	17	–	37	.315
UC Riverside ‍‍‍	5	–	25	.167	11	–	41	.212
† – Conference champion y – Invited to the NCAA tournament * Ineligible for the 2023 NCAA tournament due to transition from Division II; As of May 27, 2023; Rankings from D1Baseball

The 2023 Cal State Fullerton Titans baseball team represented California State University, Fullerton during the 2023 NCAA Division I baseball season. The Titans played their home games at Goodwin Field. They were led by Jason Dietrich.

== Previous season ==
The Titans finished 22–33 overall, and 14–16 in the conference, and they failed to qualify for the 2022 NCAA Division I baseball tournament. It was the program's third consecutive season with a losing streak.

== Personnel ==
=== Starters ===
Lineup
Pos.	No.	Player.	Year
C	25	Cole Urman	Jr.
1B	5	Caden Connor	Jr.
2B	6	Maddox Latta	So.
3B	1	Zach Lew	Sr.
SS	3	JT Navyac	Jr.
LF	19	Colby Wallace	So.
CF	31	Moises Guzman	So.
RF	4	Nate Nankil	Jr.
DH	22	Brendan Bobo	Jr.

Weekend pitching rotation
Day	No.	Player.	Year
Friday	10	Tyler Stultz	Jr.
Saturday	24	Trevor Hinkel	RS-Jr.
Sunday	41	Evan Yates	So.

== Schedule ==
Legend
	Titans win
	Titans loss
	Postponement
**Bold**	Titans team member

2023 Cal State Fullerton Titans baseball game log
Regular season
February (2-4)

Date	Opponent	Rank	Site/stadium	Score	Win	Loss	Save	TV	Attendance	Overall record	Big West record

March (11-4)

Date	Opponent	Rank	Site/stadium	Score	Win	Loss	Save	TV	Attendance	Overall record	Big West record

April (13-5)

Date	Opponent	Rank	Site/stadium	Score	Win	Loss	Save	TV	Attendance	Overall record	Big West record

May (5-9)

Date	Opponent	Rank	Site/stadium	Score	Win	Loss	Save	TV	Attendance	Overall record	Big West record

NCAA Tournament (Stanford Super Regional) (1-1)

Date	Opponent (Seed)	Rank (Seed)	Site/stadium	Score	Win	Loss	Save	TV	Attendance	Overall record	Tournament record
June 2; 7:00 PM PST	vs. (2) Texas A&M	(3)	Sunken Diamond, Stanford, California	**L** 12-7	Shane Sdao (4-1)	**Tyler Stultz (7-5)**	None	ESPN2	1,906	-	-
June 3; 12:00 PM PST	vs (4) San Jose State	(3)	Sunken Diamond, Stanford, California	**W 9-5**	**Evan Yates (3-2)**	Jake White (6-3)	None	ESPN2	1,695	-	-
June 4; 12:00 PM PST	vs (1) No. 3 Stanford or (2) Texas A&M	(3)	Sunken Diamond, Stanford, California							-	-

Source: Rankings are based on the team's current ranking in the D1Baseball poll. Parentheses indicate tournament seedings.

=== Stanford Super Regional ===
Regional	Regional
1	**Stanford**	**13**
4	San Jose State	2
1	Stanford
2	Texas A&M
3	Cal State Fullerton	7
2	**Texas A&M**	**12**
Stanford Regional – Sunken Diamond
4	San Jose State	5
3	**Cal State Fullerton**	**9**
3	Cal State Fullerton
1	**Miami (FL)**	**9**
4	Maine	1
1	Miami (FL)
2	Texas
3	Louisiana	2
2	**Texas**	**4**
Coral Gables Regional – Alex Rodriguez Park at Mark Light Field
4	Maine	10
3	**Louisiana**	**19**
3	Louisiana

Regional Final

Super Regional

== Rankings ==
Ranking movements Legend: ██ Increase in ranking ██ Decrease in ranking — = Not ranked RV = Received votes
	Week																
Poll	Pre	1	2	3	4	5	6	7	8	9	10	11	12	13	14	15	Final
Coaches'	RV	RV*	—	RV	—	—	—	—	—	RV	RV	RV					
Baseball America	—	—	—	—	—	—	—	—	—	—	—	—					
Collegiate Baseball^	RV	RV	—	—	—	—	—	21	13	13	5	12					
NCBWA†	RV	RV	—	RV	—	—	—	RV	RV	RV	RV	29					
D1Baseball	—	—	—	—	—	—	—	—	—	—	—	24					

^ Collegiate Baseball ranked 40 teams in their preseason poll, but only ranked 30 teams weekly during the season.
† NCBWA ranks 30 teams in their preseason poll, but only ranks 25 teams weekly during the season.
* A new poll was not released for this week, so for comparison purposes, the previous week's ranking is inserted in this week's slot.
