= Dave Serrano =

American baseball coach (born 1964)

Current position
- Title: Head coach
- Team: Johnson University
- Conference: Appalachian Athletic
- Record: 100–53

Biographical details
- Born: June 28, 1964 (age 61); Torrance, California, U.S.

Playing career
- 1984–1985: Cerritos
- 1986: Cal State Fullerton
- Position: Pitcher

Coaching career (HC unless noted)
- 1988–1990: Cerritos (asst.)
- 1991: Cerritos
- 1992–1994: Cerritos (asst.)
- 1995–1996: Tennessee (asst.)
- 1997–2004: Cal State Fullerton (P/RC)
- 2005–2007: UC Irvine
- 2008–2011: Cal State Fullerton
- 2012–2017: Tennessee
- 2018: West Virginia (P)
- 2020–2022: Cal State Northridge
- 2023–present: Johnson University

Head coaching record
- Overall: 509–348-1 (.594) 100–53 (.654) (NAIA) 28–16 (.636) (JUCO)

Accomplishments and honors

Championships
- 3x Big West Conference (2008,10-11); NAIA Salina,Kansas Regionals Champions (2026)

Awards
- 2007 Baseball America National Coach of the Year; 2010 Big West Coach of the Year

David Scott Serrano (born June 28, 1964) is an American college baseball coach and former pitcher who is the current head baseball coach of the Johnson Royals. Serrano was a pitcher at Cerritos College from 1984 to 1985 and at California State University, Fullerton from 1986 to 1987 for coach Augie Garrido. After serving as an assistant coach at Cerritos College, he spent the 1990 season as their head coach. He served as the head coach at University of California, Irvine from 2005 to 2007, Cal State Fullerton from 2008 to 2011, the University of Tennessee from 2012 to 2017 and CSU Northridge from 2020–2022.

== Playing career ==
Serrano graduated from Cerritos High School in 1982 and pitched two seasons at Cerritos College. He went 12–1 and earned community college All-American honors in 1985 while leading the Falcons to a 39–5 record and a state championship. Serrano then pitched for Cal State Fullerton in 1986, recording a 3–4 mark with one save in 15 appearances. He earned his bachelor's degree from Trinity College and University (now Bronte International University), an unaccredited institution.

== Coaching career ==
He began his coaching career as an assistant to George Horton at Cerritos College in 1988. He succeeded Horton for the 1991 season after Horton left to become associate head coach to Augie Garrido at Cal State Fullerton. Serrano returned to assistant coaching duties for 1992–94 for the Falcons before going to Tennessee, where he served two seasons as pitching coach for Rod Delmonico. The Volunteers went 97–36 and made their first trip to Omaha in 44 years in 1995, when they were twice routed by Fullerton's third national championship team.

Serrano would become the pitching coach and recruiting coordinator for former Titan head coach Horton and the Titans for the 1997 through 2004 seasons. During Serrano's 8-year tenure at Fullerton, the Titans went 356–154–1 (.698) and were in the NCAA Tournament every season. They won six Big West Conference championships, four NCAA Regionals and four NCAA Super Regionals to earn four trips to Omaha. In 2004, he was named the ABCA/Baseball America Assistant Coach of the Year.

Every one of Serrano's Fullerton recruiting classes was ranked in the nation's Top 20. He also has nurtured a long list of pitchers who went on to play professionally, including Chad Cordero. He tutored six conference pitchers of the year and of the 25 All-American players at Fullerton during his tenure, 15 were pitchers.

He left after the Titans' fourth national championship to become head coach at UC Irvine, where he compiled a 114–66–1 (.633) record over three seasons and took the Anteaters to their first College World Series appearance in 2007. Their 47–17–1 season earned Serrano national coach of the year honors from Baseball America, which had ranked him as the nation's top assistant coach in 2004 with the Titans. He developed three more All-American pitchers at UCI.

Serrano took over the Fullerton State Titans baseball team in 2008. He led the Titans to the NCAA tournament every year that he served as head coach. He also helped guide the Titans to the College World Series in 2009. Serrano's teams went on to play in Super Regionals in each of his first three seasons with Fullerton. The 2008, 2010, and 2011 Titans teams won the Big West Conference championships. He compiled an overall record of 175–73 in his four seasons with the Titans.

Serrano was announced as the Tennessee Volunteers baseball head coach on June 15, 2011, replacing Todd Raleigh. He did not have a winning record in conference play in six seasons with the Vols. He resigned at the end of the Volunteers' 2017 season.

On July 3, 2017, Serrano was named the West Virginia Mountaineers' pitching coach. WVU and Serrano had a "mutual parting of ways" after one season.

On June 24, 2019, Serrano was named the head coach for the Cal State Northridge Matadors. On January 25, 2022, Serrano announced his retirement from coaching, effective end of season.

On July 10, 2023, Serrano came out of retirement and took over the reins as head coach at Johnson University in Knoxville, Tennessee. Taking over a program that was 5-44 (4-26 in the AAC Conference) the previous season, Serrano turned things around quickly. He led the Royals to an impressive 24-21 overall mark which included winning the last 6 consecutive games to earn a post-season bid for the first time in school history. The 24 overall wins and 14 AAC Conference wins are both new school records.

== Head coaching record ==
Record table
Season	Team	Overall	Conference	Standing	Postseason
Cerritos Falcons (South Coast Conference (CCCAA)) (1991–1991)
1991	Cerritos College	28-16	18–6		
Cerritos College (3C2A):		28-16	18-6		
UC Irvine Anteaters (Big West Conference) (2005–2007)
2005	UC Irvine	31–25	10–11	5th	
2006	UC Irvine	36–24	11–10	3rd	NCAA Regional
2007	UC Irvine	47–17–1	15–6	T–2nd	College World Series
UC Irvine:		114–66–1	36–27		
Cal State Fullerton Titans (Big West Conference) (2008–2011)
2008	Cal State Fullerton	41–22	16–8	T–1st	NCAA Super Regional
2009	Cal State Fullerton	47–16	17–7	2nd	College World Series
2010	Cal State Fullerton	46–18	21–3	1st	NCAA Super Regional
2011	Cal State Fullerton	41–17	19–5	1st	NCAA Regional
Cal State Fullerton:		175–73	73–23		
Tennessee Volunteers (Southeastern Conference) (2012–2017)
2012	Tennessee	24–31	8–22	6th (East)	
2013	Tennessee	22–30	8–20	6th (East)	
2014	Tennessee	31–23	12–18	5th (East)	SEC Tournament
2015	Tennessee	24–26	11–18	6th (East)	SEC Tournament
2016	Tennessee	29–28	9–21	T–6th (East)	SEC Tournament
2017	Tennessee	27–25	7–21	7th (East)	
Tennessee:		157–163	55–120		
Cal State Northridge Matadors (Big West Conference) (2020–2022)
2020	Cal State Northridge	10–5	0–0		Season canceled due to COVID-19
2021	Cal State Northridge	21–19	21-19	T-4th	
2022	Cal State Northridge	32–22	17–13		
Cal State Northridge:		63–46	38–32		
Johnson University Royals (Appalachian Athletic Conference) (2024–present)
2024	Johnson University	24–21	14–16	7th	AAC Tournament
2025	Johnson University	36–10	21–9	4th	NAIA Shreveport Regional
2026	Johnson University	40–14	20–6	2nd	NAIA World Series (5th)
Johnson University (NAIA):		100–53	55-31		
Total:		516–349–1			
National champion Postseason invitational champion Conference regular season champion Conference regular season and conference tournament champion Division regular season champion Division regular season and conference tournament champion Conference tournament champion

== Personal ==
He and his second wife, Tracy, have three sons: Kyle, Zachary, and Parker. Kyle played for Dave at Tennessee.
