= Cal State Fullerton Titans baseball =

Baseball team

California State University, Fullerton Titans
- 2027 Cal State Fullerton Titans baseball team
- Founded: 1965
- University: California State University, Fullerton
- Head coach: Cory Vanderhook (interim)
- Conference: Big West
- Location: Fullerton, California
- Home stadium: Goodwin Field (capacity: 3,500)
- Nickname: Titans

College World Series champions
- 1979, 1984, 1995, 2004

College World Series runner-up
- 1992

College World Series appearances
- 1975, 1979, 1982, 1984, 1988, 1990, 1992, 1994, 1995, 1999, 2001, 2003, 2004, 2006, 2007, 2009, 2015, 2017

NCAA regional champions
- 1975, 1979, 1982, 1984, 1988, 1990, 1992, 1994, 1995, 1999, 2001, 2003, 2004, 2005, 2006, 2007, 2008, 2009, 2010, 2013, 2015, 2017, 2018

NCAA tournament appearances
- 1975, 1976, 1977, 1978, 1979, 1980, 1981, 1982, 1983, 1984, 1987, 1988, 1990, 1992, 1993, 1994, 1995, 1996, 1997, 1998, 1999, 2000, 2001, 2002, 2003, 2004, 2005, 2006, 2007, 2008, 2009, 2010, 2011, 2012, 2013, 2014, 2015, 2016, 2017, 2018, 2023

Conference regular season champions
- PCAA: 1975, 1976, 1985, 1987; SCBA: 1977, 1978, 1979, 1980, 1981, 1982, 1983, 1984; Big West: 1990, 1991, 1994, 1995, 1999, 2000, 2001, 2004, 2005, 2006, 2008, 2011, 2012, 2013, 2015, 2016, 2018

The Cal State Fullerton Titans baseball team represents California State University, Fullerton in NCAA Division I college baseball.

Along with the other CSUF athletic teams, the baseball team participates in the Big West Conference. Since its early days, Titan Baseball has been considered an elite program in college baseball, making 18 College World Series appearances and winning four national championships (1979, 1984, 1995, and 2004).

The Titans play their home games on Fullerton's campus at Goodwin Field and are currently coached on an interim basis by Cory Vanderhook.

== Conference membership history ==
- 1975–1976: Pacific Coast Athletic Association (PCAA)
- 1977–1984: SCBA
- 1985–1989: PCAA
- 1990–present: Big West Conference

== History ==
=== George Horton era ===
Horton played for Garrido in 1975 and 1976, before beginning his coaching career. Horton began his coaching career immediately after the 1976 season, but left Cerritos College after 1990 to return to Fullerton as an assistant under Garrido. He would remain in that position, until after the 1996 season. When Garrido left Fullerton for the second time, George Horton was named head coach of the baseball program.

The Titans finished 39–24–1 in Horton's first year, and 47–17 winning the Big West South title in his second year. Even though he had success in first two seasons, the Titans failed to make it to Omaha. In 1999, Horton led the Titans to their first 50 win season since 1995, and made his first appearance as head coach in the College World Series. The Titans lost their opening round game to Stanford, but bounced back to beat Texas A&M to give Horton his first career win at the CWS. That would be the end of the road though for the 1999 Titans, as they lost their next game to Florida St. and were eliminated from the CWS. Horton would go on to lead the Titans back to Omaha again in 2001 and 2003, but did not reach the championship round.

==== 2004 national championship ====
In 2004, Horton and Titans had an up and down regular season, but breezed through conference play. The Titans compiled an overall record of 36–20, including an impressive 19–2 record in conference play. The Titans were awarded a host regional site in the 2004 NCAA Division I baseball tournament and the No. 2 seed at their regional. In regional play, the Titans won their opening round game, but were forced into the loser's bracket after losing to the No. 4 seed, Pepperdine, 7–6. Facing elimination, the Titans beat No. 1 seed Arizona St. 5–0, who was overall the No. 7 national seed that year. In the championship round, Fullerton left little doubt, defeating Pepperdine 15–1 and 16–3 to advance to the super regional round of play.

Fullerton hosted Tulane in the super regional round after Tulane won the Oxford regional. Once again, Fullerton completely dominated the games. They advanced to the College World Series after winning, 9–0 and 10–7. In the College World Series, the Titans advanced through the winner's bracket beating South Carolina 2–0 and Miami 6–3. After Carolina advanced through the loser's bracket, they would have to defeat the Titans twice to advance to the championship round. The Gamecocks won the first contest 5–3, but the Titans fought back the next day to win the second game 4–0. Fullerton advanced to the championship round for the first time since winning it all in 1995.

The championship round saw Horton face off against his mentor and former Fullerton coach Augie Garrido. Garrido led Texas back to the championship after previously winning it all with the Longhorns in 2002. The Titans won the first game in the best-of-three series, 6–4. On Sunday June 27, 2004, the Titans defeated the Longhorns 3–2 to claim their 4th national title. The Titans finished the season 47–22 overall.

==== Horton leaves for Oregon ====
After the 2004 national championship, Horton coached the Titans for 3 more season. After the 2007 season, Horton left his alma mater to become head coach of the Oregon Ducks. Oregon did not field a baseball team from 1982 until they played their first game in 2009. Oregon reportedly made Horton one of the highest paid coaches in Division I baseball at the time. Fullerton was left in a similar situation after losing Garrido to Texas after the 1996 season. During his 11 seasons as head coach of the Titans, Horton compiled a record of 490–212–1.

=== Dave Serrano era ===
After losing another great coach to a school that offered a better financial situation, Fullerton was back in the same position it was 11 years earlier. A program that was only 3 years removed from its fourth national title was once again in search of a new head coach. Once again Fullerton went after another former player. In early September 2007, Dave Serrano became just the fourth head coach of the Cal St. Fullerton Titans baseball program. Serrano also played under Augie Garrido during his first tenure as Titans coach, and then followed a similar path as Horton. He began his coaching career at Cerritos College as an assistant, and after a short stint at Tennessee as an assistant George Horton hired him at Fullerton. Serrano became Horton's top assistant and remained in that position until 2004. In 2004, he left Fullerton to become head coach at UC Irvine. After four seasons with the Anteaters, Serrano departed to return to Fullerton. Serrano had just led the Anteaters to their first ever College World Series.

In his first year as head coach, Serrano posted a 37–19 mark during the regular season. That mark was good enough to earn the Titans the No. 5 national seed in the 2008 NCAA Division I baseball tournament. After winning the Fullerton regional, the Titans hosted Stanford during the Super Regional round of play. The Cardinal won the first game by a single run, and went on to eliminate the Titans the following day. Overall Serrano posted a 41–22 mark during his first year as head coach of the Titans.

Serrano's improved on the 2008 season success during the 2009 campaign. Although they finished second in the Big West in 2009, the Titans still finished the regular season with a mark of 42–14. That record was good enough to earn the Titans the No. 2 national seed during the 2009 NCAA Division I baseball tournament. The Titans breezed through the Fullerton regional, winning it in 3 games by scores of 18–2, 7–4, and 16–3. Louisville traveled to Fullerton during the super regional round, and once again Fullerton had no problem with the Cardinal. Fullerton eliminated Louisville in two games with scores of 12–0 and 11–2. Serrano earned his first trip to the College World Series as Titans head coach, and his second overall as a head coach. The Titans failed to meet expectation in Omaha though. They were quickly eliminated losing their first two games. They lost their opening round game to Arkansas 10–6, and lost in an elimination game to Virginia 7–5. The Titans completed the 2009 season with a 47–16 overall record.

==== Serrano leaves for Tennessee ====
Serrano was announced as the Tennessee Volunteers baseball head coach on June 15, 2011. He became the 24th head coach of Tennessee baseball, replacing Todd Raleigh. Much like Garrido and Horton, it is believed that Serrano left for a better financial situation. According to reports, Serrano made approximately $140,000 at Fullerton, while Tennessee was reportedly offering around $500,000. During his 4 years as head coach, the Titans compiled a 175–73 record overall.

=== Rick Vanderhook era ===
On June 24, 2011, CSUF named Rick Vanderhook head baseball coach, the fifth coach in the program's esteemed history. He played on the Titan's 1984 national championship team and was an assistant coach from 1985–88 and 1991–2007, at which point he departed to become an assistant coach at UCLA. Three years later, Vanderhook accepted the job on a three-year contract at Fullerton. Coach Vanderhook's accomplishments to date include NCAA tournament appearances in almost every year (except 2019) he has been the head coach, the program's second highest single season winning percentage at .836 in 2013, and guiding the 2015 club back to Omaha thus ending a 5-year drought that was the longest lapse in Titans representation at the CWS in 40 years. In 2017, CSUF made its 18th appearance at the CWS, 2nd in the past three years, after winning the Stanford regional and beating Big West rivals CSULB at the Long Beach super regional. Vanderhook retired after the 2021 season.

== Goodwin Field ==
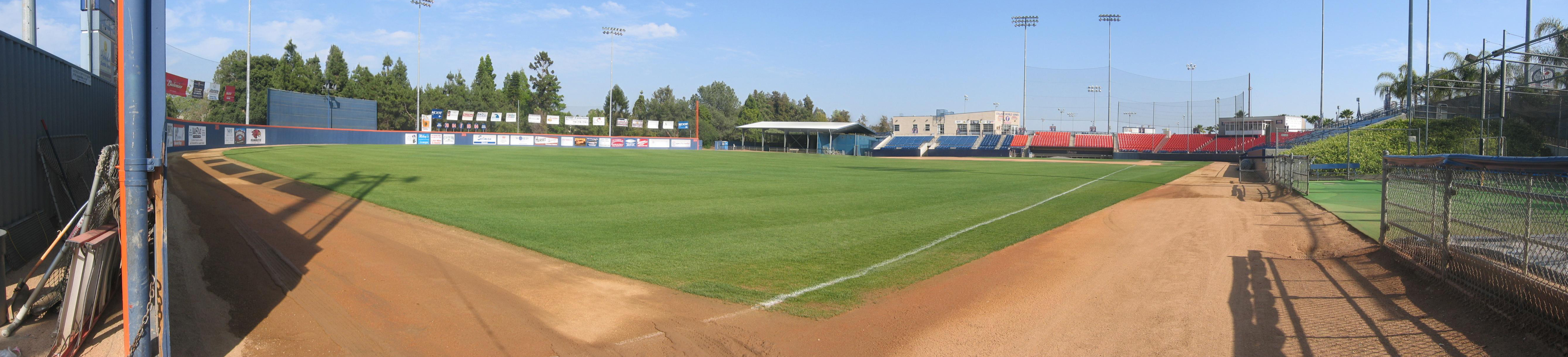
Goodwin Field in Fullerton, California

Goodwin Field is a baseball stadium in Fullerton, California named for Jerry and Merilyn Goodwin, who donated $1 million for renovations. It was opened on April 18, 1992 with a two-game sweep of Loyola Marymount.

== Head coaches ==
- Records updated through end of the 2024 season

Tenure	Coach	Years	Record	Pct.
1975–1987, 1991–1996	Augie Garrido	19	875–341–5	.719
1988–1990	Larry Cochell	3	109–68	.616
1997–2007	George Horton	11	490–212–1	.698
2008–2011	Dave Serrano	4	175–73	.706
2012–2021	Rick Vanderhook	10	322–224	.590
2022–present	Jason Dietrich	3	70–95	.424
Totals	6 coaches	50 seasons	2,043–1,013–6	.668

== Year-by-year NCAA Division I results ==
Records taken from the Cal. St. Fullerton baseball archive.

Year	Head coach	Overall	Winning %	Conference	Winning %	Conf. finish	Notes
1975	Augie Garrido	36–16–1	.692	14–7	.667	1st	CWS appearance
1976	Augie Garrido	48–15	.762	17–4	.810	1st	
1977	Augie Garrido	44–14	.759	17–7	.708	t-1st	
1978	Augie Garrido	44–13	.772	24–4	.857	1st	
1979	Augie Garrido	60–14–1	.811	23–4–1	.839	1st	CWS title
1980	Augie Garrido	49–18–1	.731	20–8	.714	1st	
1981	Augie Garrido	47–18	.723	22–6	.786	1st	
1982	Augie Garrido	51–23	.689	23–5	.821	1st	CWS appearance
1983	Augie Garrido	50–21–1	.704	22–6	.786	t-1st	
1984	Augie Garrido	66–20	.767	22–6	.786	1st	CWS title
1985	Augie Garrido	36–32–1	.529	21–9	.700	1st	
1986	Augie Garrido	36–21	.632	12–9	.571	t-3rd	
1987	Augie Garrido	44–17	.746	18–3	.857	1st	
1988	Larry Cochell	43–18	.705	12–3	.800	3rd	CWS appearance
1989	Larry Cochell	30–27	.526	10–11	.476	5th	
1990	Larry Cochell	36–23	.610	13–5	.722	1st	CWS appearance
1991	Augie Garrido	34–22	.607	15–6	.714	t-1st	
1992	Augie Garrido	46–17	.730	17–7	.708	2nd	CWS appearance
1993	Augie Garrido	35–19	.648	16–5	.762	2nd	
1994	Augie Garrido	47–16	.763	25–5	.750	t-1st	CWS appearance
1995	Augie Garrido	57–9	.864	18–3	.857	1st	CWS title
1996	Augie Garrido	45–16	.738	13–8	.619	4th	
1997	George Horton	39–24–1	.617	21–9	.700	2nd (South)	
1998	George Horton	47–17	.734	25–5	.833	1st (South)	
1999	George Horton	50–14	.781	25–5	.833	1st	CWS appearance
2000	George Horton	38–21	.644	21–9	.700	t-1st	
2001	George Horton	48–18	.727	14–4	.778	1st	CWS appearance
2002	George Horton	37–22	.627	14–10	.583	t-4th	
2003	George Horton	50–16	.758	15–6	.714	2nd	CWS appearance
2004	George Horton	47–22	.681	19–2	.905	1st	CWS title
2005	George Horton	48–18	.719	16–6	.762	1st	
2006	George Horton	50–15	.769	18–3	.857	1st	CWS appearance
2007	George Horton	38–25	.603	10–11	.476	5th	CWS appearance
2008	Dave Serrano	41–22	.651	16–8	.667	t-1st	
2009	Dave Serrano	47–16	.746	17–7	.708	2nd	CWS appearance
2010	Dave Serrano	46–18	.719	21–3	.875	1st	
2011	Dave Serrano	41–17	.707	19–5	.792	1st	
2012	Rick Vanderhook	36–21	.632	17–7	.708	1st	
2013	Rick Vanderhook	51–10	.836	23–4	.852	1st	
2014	Rick Vanderhook	34–24	.586	14–10	.583	4th	
2015	Rick Vanderhook	39–25	.609	19–5	.792	1st	CWS appearance
2016	Rick Vanderhook	36–23	.610	17–7	.708	1st	
2017	Rick Vanderhook	39–24	.619	15-9	.625	3rd	CWS appearance
2018	Rick Vanderhook	36–24	.600	18-6	.750	1st	
2019	Rick Vanderhook	27–26	.509	13-11	.542	4th	
2020	Rick Vanderhook	4–12	.250				Season canceled
2021	Rick Vanderhook	20–35	.364	13-23	.361	9th	
2022	Jason Dietrich	22-33	.400	14-16	.467	7th	
2023	Jason Dietrich	32-24	.571	20-10	.667	t-2nd	
2024	Jason Dietrich	16-38	.296	7-23	.233	10th	
2025	Jason Dietrich	29-27	.518	19-11	.633	3rd	

== National championships ==
Year	Coach	Record	Result
1979	Augie Garrido	60–14–1	Beat Arkansas, 2–1
1984	Augie Garrido	66–20	Beat Texas, 3–1
1995	Augie Garrido	57–9	Beat Southern Cal, 11–5
2004	George Horton	47–22	Beat Texas, 6–4 & 3–2
Total national championships			4

== Fullerton in the NCAA tournament ==
- The NCAA Division I baseball tournament started in 1947.
- The format of the tournament has changed through the years.
- Fullerton began Division I baseball in 1975.
- The Titans' all-time NCAA record is 163–90 (.644)
- The Titans' Regional record is 107–45 (.704)
- The Titans' Super Regional record is 21–14 (.600)
- The Titans' are 34–29 (.540) in Omaha

Year	Record	Pct	Notes
1975	3–3	.500	Won West Regional; College World Series (7th Place)
1976	3–2	.600	Eliminated by Washington St. in West Regional Finals
1977	1–2	.333	Eliminated by Washington St. in Tempe Regional
1978	1–2	.333	Eliminated by Arizona in Los Angeles Regional
1979	9–2	.818	Won West Regional; College World Series Champions
1980	1–2	.333	Eliminated by Gonzaga in Tucson Regional
1981	2–2	.500	Eliminated by Arizona St. in Tempe Regional
1982	3–2	.600	Won Tempe Regional; College World Series (7th Place)
1983	1–2	.333	Eliminated by Fresno St. in Tempe Regional
1984	8–2	.800	Won Fresno Regional; College World Series Champions
Cal St. Fullerton did not make the tournament in 1985 or 1986.
1987	2–2	.500	Eliminated by LSU in New Orleans Regional
1988	6–2	.750	Won Starkville Regional; College World Series
Cal St. Fullerton did not make the tournament in 1989.
1990	4–2	.667	Won Austin Regional; College World Series (7th Place)
Cal St. Fullerton did not make the tournament in 1991.
1992	8–2	.800	Won Baton Rouge Regional; College World Series (2nd Place)
1993	2–2	.500	Eliminated by Southern Cal in Austin Regional
1994	6–3	.667	Won Stillwater Regional; College World Series
1995	8–0	1.000	Won Baton Rouge Regional; College World Series Champions
1996	2–2	.500	Eliminated by Rice in Wichita Regional
1997	1–2	.333	Eliminated by Fresno St. in Stanford Regional
1998	3–2	.600	Eliminated by LSU in South II Regional Finals
1999	6–3	.667	Won Fullerton Regional and Columbus Super Regional; College World Series (5th Place)
2000	2–2	.500	Eliminated by Southern Cal in Fullerton Regional finals
2001	7–3	.700	Won Fullerton Regional and Super Regional; College World Series (3rd Place)
2002	1–2	.333	Eliminated by Long Beach State in Palo Alto Regional
2003	7–3	.700	Won Fullerton Regional and Super Regional; College World Series (3rd Place)
2004	11–2	.846	Won Fullerton Regional and Super Regional; College World Series Champions
2005	5–3	.625	Won Fullerton Regional; Lost to Arizona St. in Fullerton Super Regional
2006	7–2	.778	Won Fullerton Regional and Super Regional; College World Series (3rd Place)
2007	5–2	.714	Won San Diego Regional and Fullerton Super Regional; College World Series (7th place)
2008	4–3	.571	Won Fullerton Regional; Lost to Stanford in Fullerton Super Regional
2009	5–2	.714	Won Fullerton Regional and Super Regional; College World Series (7th place)
2010	5–3	.625	Won Fullerton Regional; Lost to UCLA in the Los Angeles Super Regional
2011	1–2	.333	Eliminated by Illinois in the Fullerton Regional
2012	1–2	.333	Eliminated by Austin Peay in the Eugene Regional
2013	3–2	.600	Won Fullerton Regional; Lost to UCLA in the Fullerton Super Regional
2014	2–2	.500	Eliminated by Oklahoma State in the Stillwater Regional
2015	5–3	.625	Won Fullerton Regional and Louisville Super Regional; College World Series (7th place)
2016	1–2	.333	Eliminated by Louisiana Tech in the Starkville Regional
2017	5–3	.625	Won Palo Alto Regional and Long Beach Super Regional; College World Series (7th place)
2018	5–2	.714	Won Palo Alto Regional. Lost to Washington in the Fullerton Super Regional
Cal St. Fullerton did not make the tournament between 2019 and 2022.
2023	1–2	.333	Eliminated by Stanford in the Stanford Regional
Totals	163–90	.644	

== Notable players ==
- Michael Lorenzen, Colorado Rockies
- Matt Chapman, San Francisco Giants
- J. D. Davis (born 1993), first baseman for the Baltimore Orioles
- Jeremy Giambi
- Mark Kotsay
- Mike Lamb
- Phil Nevin
- Tim Wallach
- Ricky Romero
- Kurt Suzuki
- Justin Turner
- Connor Seabold

== Player awards ==
As of the 2021 season, there have been 70 MLB players who previously played for the university.

=== All-College World Series ===
The following is a listing of Cal State Fullerton players that were selected to the all-tournament teams during the College World Series.
^ denotes player was named MOP of the College World Series

- 1979

Dan Hanggie (3b)
Tony Hudson^ (p)
Kurt Kingsolver (c)
Matt Vejar (of)

- 1984

Bob Caffrey (c)
Eddie Delzer (p)
John Fishel^ (of)
Blaine Larker (3b)

- 1988

Jim Osborn (of)

- 1992

Phil Nevin^ (3b)
James Popoff (p)
Chris Powell (of)
Nate Rodriquez (ss)

- 1994

Mark Kotsay (of)

- 1995

Mark Kotsay^ (of)
Brian Loyd (c)
Tony Martinez (3b)
Ted Silva (p)

- 2001

David Bacani (2b)

- 2003

P. J. Pilittere (dh)
Bret Day (3b)
Justin Turner (ss)

- 2004

Felipe Garcia (dh)
Ricky Romero (p)
Jason Windsor^ (p)

- 2006

David Cooper (dh)
Danny Dorn (of)
Justin Turner (2b)

- 2017

Timmy Richards (ss)

=== Golden Spikes Award ===
The following is a listing of Cal State Fullerton players who received the Golden Spikes Award.

- 1979

Tim Wallach

- 1992

Phil Nevin

- 1995

Mark Kotsay

=== National Player of the Year awards ===
The following is a listing of Cal State Fullerton players who were named national player of the year by various publications.

- 1979

Tim Wallach – The Sporting News

- 1992

Phil Nevin – Baseball America

- 1995

Mark Kotsay – Rotary Smith Award & Collegiate Baseball

- 2004

Kurt Suzuki – Brooks Wallace Award

- 2006

Wes Roemer – Collegiate Baseball

== Stadiums ==
On April 18, 1992, Goodwin Field (then known as the third Titan Field) became the home field for Cal State Fullerton Titans baseball. It is the third on-campus park to serve as the Titans' home field.

The second on-campus stadium, Titan Field, was built around 1970 on the site of Goodwin Field, but with home plate located where the left field foul pole is now located. The Cal State Fullerton Titans football team also played at the stadium from 1980 to 1982.

The team's first on-campus field, Original Titan Field, was located to the west of Titan House, which is southeast of Goodwin Field. Home plate was laid around 1965 in the southeast corner of a field plowed from citrus groves.

Throughout the team's history, the Titans also played home games at Amerige Park (1992) and Anaheim's Boysen Park. In 1983, the Titans also played at junior college fields at Fullerton College, Orange Coast College and Santa Ana College during the installation of lights at Titan Field.

== See also ==
- List of NCAA Division I baseball programs
