= Mark Connor =

American baseball coach (born 1949)

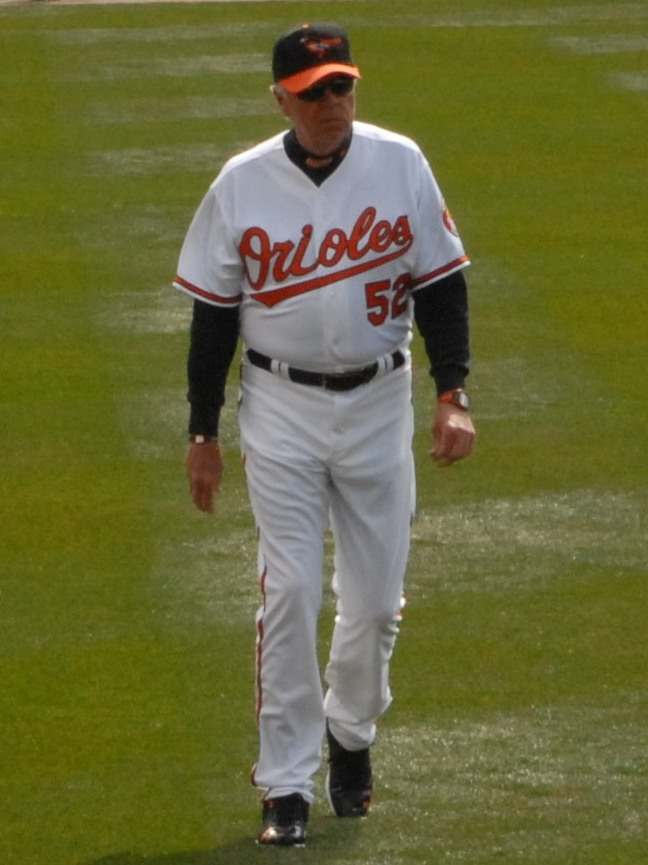
- Connor with the Baltimore Orioles in 2011
- Coach
- Born: May 27, 1949 (age 76); New York City, New York, U.S.
- Bats: Right Throws: Right
- Stats at Baseball Reference

Teams
- As coach: New York Yankees (1984–1987, 1990–1993); Arizona Diamondbacks (1998–2000); Toronto Blue Jays (2001–2002); Texas Rangers (2003–2008); Baltimore Orioles (2011)

Mark Peter Connor (born May 27, 1949) is an American former pitching coach for the New York Yankees, Baltimore Orioles, Toronto Blue Jays, Arizona Diamondbacks and Texas Rangers. Before his coaching career, he was a minor league pitcher from 1971 through 1972 who batted and threw right-handed.

== Playing career ==
Connor played two minor league seasons for the Minnesota Twins before his career was ended by an arm injury. He went 4-5 with a 2.78 ERA, three saves, and 57 strikeouts in 55 innings for the 1971 Auburn Twins. The following season, he posted a 5-2 record with a 3.83 ERA in 32 relief appearances for the Wisconsin Rapids Twins.

== Coaching career ==
Following his playing career, Connor became the pitching coach at the University of Tennessee from 1974 to 1978 and served as the head coach in 1988 and 1989. He also coached in the major leagues for the New York Yankees (1984–87, 1990–93), Arizona Diamondbacks (1998–2000) and Toronto Blue Jays (2001–02) before joining Texas (2003). Tommy John called Connor a "brilliant coach." "He knew what to look for in my motion and had an intuitive understanding of the way I threw the baseball." Even after Connor left the Yankees, John still sought him out for help. Under his guidance, Randy Johnson earned consecutive NL Cy Young Award honors in 1999 and 2000.

Connor served as the bullpen coach of the Rangers from 2003–2005 and became the team's pitching coach in 2006. At the end of the season, the team named Ron Washington as their new manager for the 2007 season. Washington kept Connor as the pitching coach.

Conner was fired by the Texas Rangers on August 1, 2008. The Rangers re-hired Connor as a consultant in December 2008.

Connor joined the Baltimore Orioles as their pitching coach for the 2011 season. He resigned on June 14 for personal reasons.
