= Nicky Delmonico =

American baseball player (born 1992)

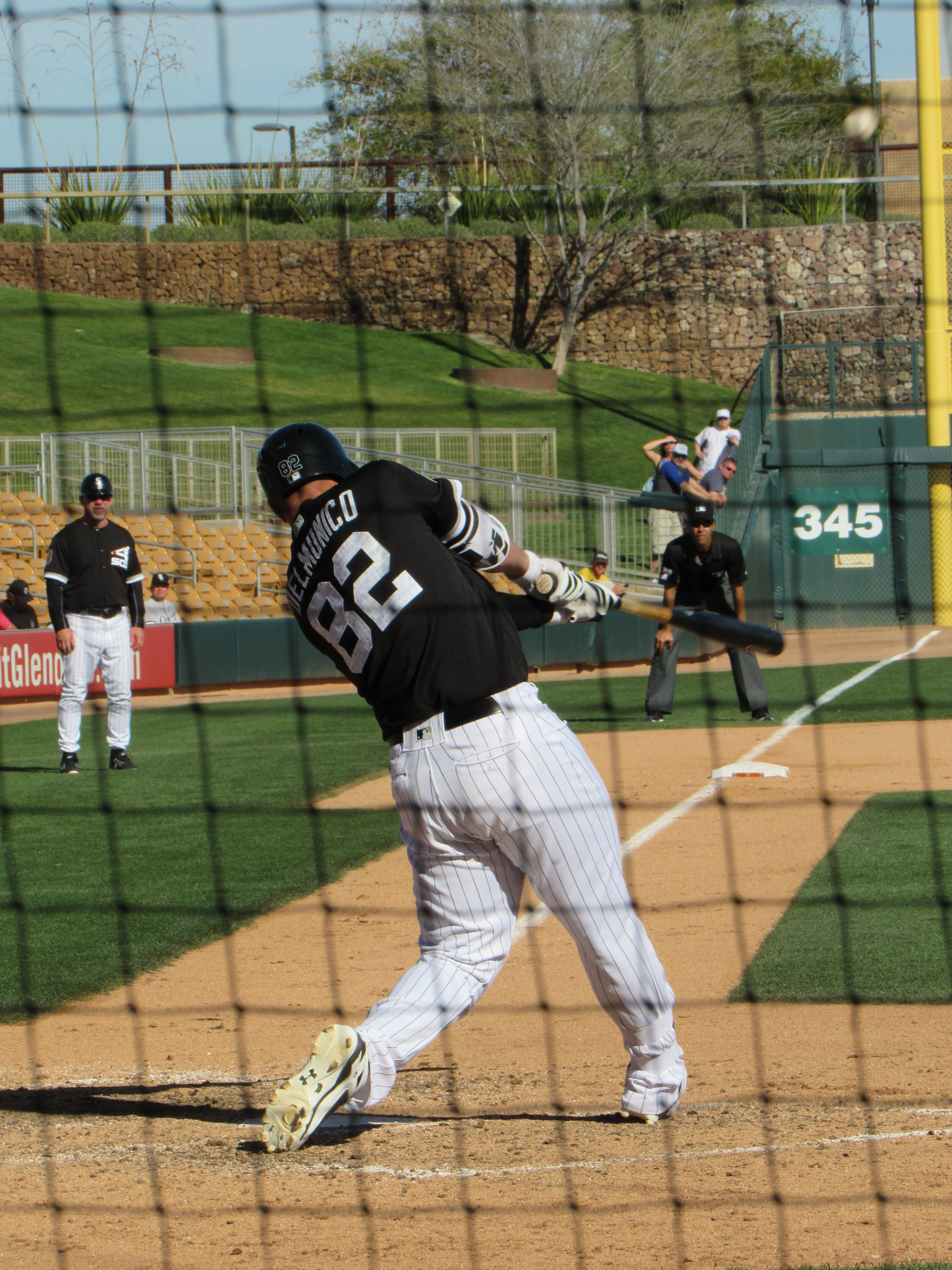
- Delmonico batting for the Chicago White Sox in spring training in 2017
- Outfielder / First baseman
- Born: July 12, 1992 (age 34); Knoxville, Tennessee, U.S.
- Batted: Left Threw: Right

MLB debut
- August 1, 2017, for the Chicago White Sox

Last MLB appearance
- August 2, 2020, for the Chicago White Sox

MLB statistics
- Batting average: .224
- Home runs: 18
- Runs batted in: 57
- Stats at Baseball Reference

Teams
- Chicago White Sox (2017–2020)

Nicholas John Delmonico (born July 12, 1992) is an American former professional baseball outfielder and current hitting coach of the Birmingham Barons, the Double–A affiliate of the Chicago White Sox. He played in Major League Baseball (MLB) for the White Sox from 2017 to 2020.

== Playing career ==
Delmonico attended Farragut High School in Knoxville, Tennessee. In the summer of 2010, he played for the United States national baseball team in the 2010 World Junior Baseball Championship.

=== Baltimore Orioles ===
The Baltimore Orioles selected Delmonico in the sixth round of the 2011 Major League Baseball draft. He broke a commitment to the University of Georgia by signing with the Orioles for a $1,525,000 signing bonus.

Delmonico played for the Delmarva Shorebirds of the Single–A South Atlantic League in 2012. He played in the league's all-star game and was named the most valuable player. He began the 2013 season with the Frederick Keys of the High–A Carolina League.

=== Milwaukee Brewers ===
On July 7, 2013, the Orioles traded Delmonico to the Milwaukee Brewers for Francisco Rodríguez.

In 2014, the Brewers assigned Delmonico to the Brevard County Manatees of the High–A Florida State League. Delmonico tested positive for Adderall in July 2014, and was suspended for 50 games. He had tried to stop using the medication, which he was prescribed for attention deficit disorder, but became addicted and failed to renew his exemption for Adderall from the drug testing policy. He asked the Brewers for his release, initially not intending to continue playing baseball.

=== Chicago White Sox ===
The Brewers released Delmonico in February 2015, and he signed with the Chicago White Sox. He started the season with the Kannapolis Intimidators of the South Atlantic League and was promoted to the Birmingham Barons of the Double–A Southern League. After starting the 2016 season with Birmingham, and was promoted to the Charlotte Knights of the Triple–A International League in May. He returned to Charlotte in 2017.

The White Sox promoted Delmonico to the major leagues for the first time on August 1, 2017. He debuted that day and recorded his first major league hit, off Toronto Blue Jays pitcher Ryan Tepera. On August 3, 2017, Delmonico hit his first career MLB home run against Rick Porcello of the Boston Red Sox. Delmonico reached base in each of his first 13 games, and hit six home runs in his first 19 games.

On August 18, 2017, Delmonico hit an inside the park home run against the Texas Rangers. On September 27, Delmonico hit a walk-off game winning two-run home run against the Los Angeles Angels. The home run allowed the Minnesota Twins to clinch a playoff spot.

After starting the 2019 season in the minor leagues, Delmonico suffered a torn labrum and underwent season-ending surgery on June 4. On June 10, 2019, Delmonico was released by the White Sox.

On December 16, 2019, Delmonico signed a minor league contract to return to the White Sox organization and was invited to spring training. Delmonico made the Opening Day roster for the White Sox in 2020. In 6 games for Chicago, he went 3–for–20 (.150) with three RBI. He was designated for assignment on August 28, 2020, following the acquisition of Jarrod Dyson. He became a free agent on November 2.

=== Cincinnati Reds ===
On February 3, 2021, Delmonico signed a minor league contract with the Cincinnati Reds organization and was invited to Spring Training. Delmonico slashed .221/.312/.382 in 19 games for the Triple-A Louisville Bats before he was released on June 1.

== Coaching career ==
On February 2, 2022, Delmonico was named as the hitting coach for the Winston-Salem Dash, the High-A Chicago White Sox affiliate.

In 2024, Delmonico was promoted to hitting coach for the Birmingham Barons, Chicago's Double-A affiliate. He reprised the role for the 2025 season.

== Personal life ==
He is the son of Rod Delmonico. His two older brothers both played competitive baseball.
