= Jason Dietrich =

American baseball coach (born 1972)

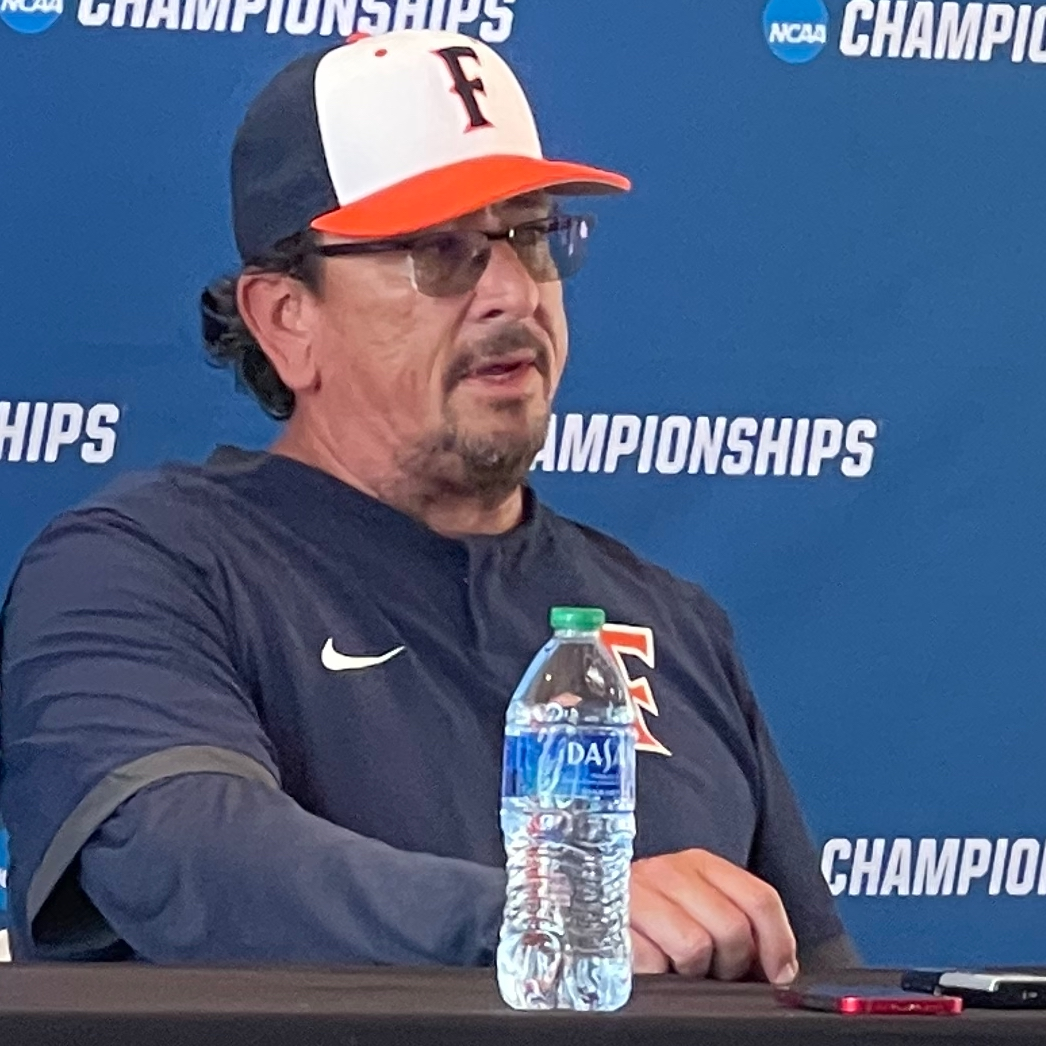
- Dietrich in 2023

Current position
- Title: Head coach
- Team: Cal State Fullerton
- Conference: Big West
- Record: 99–122 (.448)

Biographical details
- Born: November 15, 1972 (age 53); Stuttgart, West Germany

Playing career
- 1992–1993: Santa Ana
- 1994: Pepperdine
- 1995: Portland Rockies
- 1995: Salem Avalanche
- 1996: Asheville Tourists
- 1997: Salem Avalanche
- 1998: New Jersey Jackals
- Position: Pitcher

Coaching career (HC unless noted)
- 1999–2001: Arcadia (CA) HS (P)
- 2002: Los Angeles CC (P)
- 2003–2006: Irvine Valley (P)
- 2007: Cal State Los Angeles (P)
- 2008–2012: UC Irvine (P)
- 2013–2016: Cal State Fullerton (P)
- 2017–2019: Oregon (P)
- 2020–2021: East Carolina (P)
- 2022–present: Cal State Fullerton

Head coaching record
- Overall: 99–122 (.448)
- Tournaments: NCAA: 1–2

Accomplishments and honors

Awards
- Honorable Mention All-Big West (1994)

Jason Edward Dietrich (born November 15, 1972) is an American baseball coach and former pitcher who, most recently, was the head baseball coach of the Cal State Fullerton Titans from 2021-2026. He played college baseball at Santa Ana College before transferring to Pepperdine where he played for head coach Andy Lopez in 1994 before playing professionally from 1995 to 1998.

== Playing career ==
Dietrich was born in Stuttgart, West Germany, where his father was serving in the United States Army. Growing up in Garden Grove, California, Dietrich attended Mater Dei High School, in Santa Ana, California. He played college baseball at Santa Ana College. He was drafted in the 23rd round of the 1993 Major League Baseball draft by the New York Yankees, but he chose not to sign. He then transferred to Pepperdine University where he pitched for the Waves, earning Honorable Mention All-West Coast Conference in 1994. Dietrich was drafted in the 19th round of the 1994 Major League Baseball draft by the Colorado Rockies. Dietrich spent three years in the Rockies' organization before pitching for the independent league team New Jersey Jackals in 1998, his final season playing pro baseball.

== Coaching career ==
In 1999, Dietrich began serving as the pitching coach at Arcadia High School in Arcadia, California. In 2002, he moved onto Los Angeles City College as the team's pitching coach. Following a single season at Los Angeles City College, he was named the pitching coach at Irvine Valley College, where he served for 4 seasons. On December 11, 2006, Dietrich was named the pitching coach at Cal State Los Angeles. In the Fall of 2012, Dietrich was named the pitching coach at Cal State Fullerton. Following the 2016 season, Dietrich was named the Collegiate Baseball Pitching Coach of the Year.

Following his award winning season, he was named the pitching coach at Oregon. On September 15, 2019, Dietrich was named the pitching coach for the East Carolina Pirates.

On June 30, 2021, Dietrich return to Cal State Fullerton, this time as the head coach.

== Head coaching record ==
Record table
Season	Team	Overall	Conference	Standing	Postseason
Cal State Fullerton Titans (Big West Conference) (2022–present)
2022	Cal State Fullerton	22–33	14–16	7th	
2023	Cal State Fullerton	32–24	20–10	T–2nd	NCAA Regional
2024	Cal State Fullerton	16–38	7–23	10th	
2025	Cal State Fullerton	29–27	19–11	3rd	
Cal State Fullerton:		99–122 (.448)	60–60 (.500)		
Total:		99–122 (.448)			
National champion Postseason invitational champion Conference regular season champion Conference regular season and conference tournament champion Division regular season champion Division regular season and conference tournament champion Conference tournament champion
