= Tennessee Volunteers baseball =

Baseball team representing the University of Tennessee

- 2026 Tennessee Volunteers baseball team
- Founded: 1897; 129 years ago
- University: University of Tennessee
- Athletic director: Danny White
- Head coach: Josh Elander (1st season)
- Conference: SEC
- Location: Knoxville, Tennessee
- Home stadium: Lindsey Nelson Stadium (capacity: 8,012)
- Nickname: Volunteers
- Colors: Orange, white, and smokey gray

College World Series champions
- 2024

College World Series runner-up
- 1951

College World Series appearances
- 1951, 1995, 2001, 2005, 2021, 2023, 2024

NCAA regional champions
- 1995, 2001, 2005, 2021, 2022, 2023, 2024, 2025

NCAA tournament appearances
- 1951, 1993, 1994, 1995, 1996, 1997, 2001, 2004, 2005, 2019, 2021, 2022, 2023, 2024, 2025, 2026

Conference tournament champions
- 1993, 1994, 1995, 2022, 2024

Conference regular season champions
- 1951, 1994, 1995, 2022, 2024

The Tennessee Volunteers baseball team represents the University of Tennessee in NCAA Division I college baseball. Along with most other Tennessee athletic teams, the baseball team participates in the Southeastern Conference. The Volunteers play all on-campus home games at Lindsey Nelson Stadium. The Volunteers are currently coached by Josh Elander, who was an assistant under former head coach and three-time National Coach of the Year and one-time Southeastern Conference Baseball Coach of the Year, Tony Vitello. During Vitello's tenure, Tennessee has quickly become one of the premier programs in all of college baseball. From 2021 to 2024, Tennessee amassed the most overall wins, the most NCAA tournament wins, the most home runs, as well as the highest winning percentage in the country. The Vols won their first College World Series in 2024, becoming just the second team to win the title as the #1 overall seed and the first to do it since 1999. They also became the SEC's first team with 60 wins and the fourth to win the regular season title, the SEC tournament title, and the national championship in the same season.

== Stadium ==
Lindsey Nelson Stadium was constructed between the 1992 and 1993 seasons, on the site of the stadium, which was called Lower Hudson Field. In the past, the program had played at various locations including Lower Hudson Field and Shields–Watkins Field.

Lindsey Nelson was a Hall of Fame broadcaster, Tennessee native and, university alumnus best known for his work with the University of Tennessee, University of Notre Dame, New York Mets, San Francisco Giants, the National Football League and the annual Cotton Bowl Classic.

The playing field was named for Maryville, Tennessee native Robert M. Lindsay in 2007 after a $2 million athletic department contribution by Mr. Lindsay. Mr. Lindsay's father Rus Lindsay played baseball at the University of Tennessee from 1913 to 1916.

Lindsey Nelson Stadium is currently in the midst of a $98 million, multi-year renovation project with the most recent additions bringing the current official capacity to 5,548. Once the renovations are complete, a new mezzanine section of premium seating and other additions will bring the capacity up to approximately 7,750 people.

The record attendance at Lindsey Nelson stadium is 6,396, during an NCAA regional championship game against Northern Kentucky on May 31, 2024.

== Head coaches ==
After a six-year tenure, coach Dave Serrano resigned following a 101-110 overall record and no post-season trips. On June 7, 2017, Tony Vitello accepted the position as head coach, and in his first year compiled a 29-27 record, the most wins by a first-year head coach in program history. In Vitello's second season at Tennessee, he led the Vols to 40 wins and their first NCAA tournament appearance since 2005. In 2024, Vitello led the Vols to their first national championship in program history.

| Coach | W-L-T | Pct | Tenure |
|---|---|---|---|
| D. Aydelott | 6–9–1 | .406 | 1897 (1 year) |
| A.J. Greer | No Record | | 1898 (1 year) |
| W.R. Harrison | No Record | | 1899 (1 year) |
| T.R. Cornick | 6–5 | .545 | 1900 (1 year) |
| William H. Newman | 8–4 | .667 | 1902 (1 year) |
| Frank Moffett | 90–47–1 | .656 | 1903–05; 07–10; 18 (8 years) |
| Frank Callaway | 5–7–1 | .423 | 1919 (1 year) |
| James DePree | 7–8 | .467 | 1906 (1 year) |
| Zora Clevenger | 51–44–3 | .553 | 1911–16 (6 years) |
| John R. Bender | 16–11 | .593 | 1917; 1920 (2 years) |
| M. B. Banks | 38–42–3 | .476 | 1921–26 (6 years) |
| William S. Harkness | 13–27 | .325 | 1927–31 (5 years) |
| John Mauer | 24–23 | .511 | 1939–42 (4 years) |
| Ike Peel | 13–6 | .684 | 1947 (1 year) |
| S. W. Anderson | 49–51–1 | .490 | 1948–52 (5 years) |
| Bernard O’Neil | 54–60 | .474 | 1953–57 (5 years) |
| George Cafego | 49–57–2 | .463 | 1958–62 (5 years) |
| Bill Wright | 408–308–2 | .570 | 1963–81 (19 years) |
| John Whited | 145–109 | .571 | 1982–87 (6 years) |
| Ronnie Osborne | 7–18 | .280 | 1987 (1 year) |
| Mark Connor | 44–65 | .404 | 1988–89 (2 years) |
| Rod Delmonico | 699–396 | .638 | 1990–2007 (18 years) |
| Todd Raleigh | 108–113 | .489 | 2008–2011 (4 years) |
| Dave Serrano | 101–110 | .479 | 2012–2017 (6 years) |
| Tony Vitello | 341–131 | .722 | 2018–2025 (8 years) |
| Josh Elander | 38–22 | .633 | 2026–present (1 year) |

== All-time season results ==
*Through August 2, 2024
*Note: there was no team in 1901; from 1932–1938 and from 1943–1946
Information Source: 2010 Tennessee Volunteers Baseball Media Guide - History section

Year-by-Year Results
| Year | Head coach | Collegiate record | Conference record | Winning percentage | Conference finish |
|---|---|---|---|---|---|
| 1897 | D. Aydelott | 6-9-1 | | .406 | |
| 1898 | A. J. Greer | N/A | | N/A | |
| 1899 | W. R. Harrison | N/A | | N/A | |
| 1900 | T. R. Cornick | 6-5 | | .545 | |
| 1902 | William H. Newman | 8-4 | | .667 | |
| 1903 | Frank Moffett | 8-10 | | .444 | |
| 1904 | Frank Moffett | 9-5 | | .643 | |
| 1905 | Frank Moffett | 3-5 | | .375 | |
| 1906 | James DePree | 7-8 | | .467 | |
| 1907 | Frank Moffett | 17-10 | | .630 | |
| 1908 | Frank Moffett | 16-3 | | .842 | |
| 1909 | Frank Moffett | 18-5-1 | | .771 | |
| 1910 | Frank Moffett | 11-7 | | .611 | |
| 1911 | Zora Clevenger | 10-8 | | .556 | |
| 1912 | Zora Clevenger | 7-11-1 | | .395 | |
| 1913 | Zora Clevenger | 5-8-1 | | .393 | |
| 1914 | Zora Clevenger | 6-6-1 | | .500 | |
| 1915 | Zora Clevenger | 10-6 | | .625 | |
| 1916 | Zora Clevenger | 13-5 | | .722 | |
| 1917 | John R. Bender | 7-6 | | .538 | |
| 1918 | Frank Moffett | 8-2 | | .800 | |
| 1919 | Frank Moffett | 5-7-1 | | .423 | |
| 1920 | John R. Bender | 9-5 | | .643 | |
| 1921 | M. B. Banks | 10-7 | | .588 | |
| 1922 | M. B. Banks | 5-10-2 | | .353 | |
| 1923 | M. B. Banks | 5-5-1 | | .500 | |
| 1924 | M. B. Banks | 9-9 | | .500 | |
| 1925 | M. B. Banks | 4-5 | | .444 | |
| 1926 | M. B. Banks | 5-6 | | .455 | |
| 1927 | William S. Harkness | 3-9 | | .250 | |
| 1928 | William S. Harkness | 3-9 | | .250 | |
| 1929 | William S. Harkness | 3-5 | | .375 | |
| 1930 | William S. Harkness | 4-4 | | .500 | |
| 1931 | William S. Harkness | 6-3 | | .667 | |
| 1939 | John Mauer | 7-2 | 1-1 | .778 | 8th SEC |
| 1940 | John Mauer | 4-9 | 2-4 | .308 | 10th SEC |
| 1941 | John Mauer | 7-6 | 3-3 | .538 | 6th SEC |
| 1942 | John Mauer | 6-6 | 1-2 | .500 | 10th SEC |
| 1947 | Ike Peel | 13-6 | 5-3 | .684 | 3rd SEC |
| 1948 | S. W. Anderson | 4-18-1 | 3-16-1 | .196 | 12th SEC |
| 1949 | S. W. Anderson | 6-12 | 5-9 | .333 | 10th SEC |
| 1950 | S. W. Anderson | 8-9 | 7-9 | .471 | 7th SEC |
| 1951 | S. W. Anderson | 20-3 | 16-1 | .870 | SEC Champions |
| 1952 | S. W. Anderson | 11-9 | 11-7 | .550 | 4th SEC |
| 1953 | Bernard O'Neil | 14-8 | 6-7 | .636 | 8th SEC |
| 1954 | Bernard O'Neil | 8-17 | 4-10 | .320 | T-11th SEC |
| 1955 | Bernard O'Neil | 13-8 | 8-6 | .619 | 6th SEC |
| 1956 | Bernard O'Neil | 10-13 | 7-8 | .435 | 6th SEC |
| 1957 | Bernard O'Neil | 9-14 | 4-12 | .391 | 10th SEC |
| 1958 | George Cafego | 2-13-1 | 1-10 | .156 | 12th SEC |
| 1959 | George Cafego | 9-9 | 4-8 | .500 | 6th SEC East |
| 1960 | George Cafego | 9-13-1 | 5-12 | .413 | 7th SEC East |
| 1961 | George Cafego | 15-10 | 6-8 | .600 | 6th SEC East |
| 1962 | George Cafego | 14-12 | 9-7 | .538 | 4th SEC East |
| 1963 | Bill Wright | 11-15 | 8-9 | .423 | 5th SEC East |
| 1964 | Bill Wright | 17-14 | 8-5 | .583 | 3rd SEC East |
| 1965 | Bill Wright | 14-10 | 8-5 | .583 | 4th SEC East |
| 1966 | Bill Wright | 22-9 | 11-2 | .710 | 1st SEC East |
| 1967 | Bill Wright | 14-16 | 8-9 | .467 | 4th SEC East |
| 1968 | Bill Wright | 20-12 | 8-5 | .625 | 2nd SEC East |
| 1969 | Bill Wright | 19-15 | 9-5 | .559 | 2nd SEC East |
| 1970 | Bill Wright | 24-10 | 12-3 | .706 | 1st SEC East |
| 1971 | Bill Wright | 15-15-1 | 7-7 | .500 | 4th SEC East |
| 1972 | Bill Wright | 19-14 | 7-6 | .576 | 2nd SEC East |
| 1973 | Bill Wright | 20-15 | 9-7 | .571 | 2nd SEC East |
| 1974 | Bill Wright | 29-15 | 10-7 | .659 | 3rd SEC East |
| 1975 | Bill Wright | 32-16 | 10-7 | .667 | 2nd SEC East |
| 1976 | Bill Wright | 33-17 | 15-9 | .660 | 2nd SEC East |
| 1977 | Bill Wright | 24-24-1 | 11-12 | .500 | 3rd SEC East |
| 1978 | Bill Wright | 25-21 | 11-12 | .543 | 3rd SEC East |
| 1979 | Bill Wright | 25-22 | 10-14 | .532 | 4th SEC East |
| 1980 | Bill Wright | 23-21 | 6-14 | .523 | 5th SEC East |
| 1981 | Bill Wright | 22-27 | 10-13 | .449 | 3rd SEC East |
| 1982 | John Whited | 29-17 | 13-9 | .630 | 2nd SEC East |
| 1983 | John Whited | 26-16 | 12-7 | .619 | 2nd SEC East |
| 1984 | John Whited | 27-21 | 11-12 | .563 | 2nd SEC East |
| 1985 | John Whited | 26-23 | 10-13 | .531 | 5th SEC East |
| 1986 | John Whited | 27-23 | 10-17 | .540 | 8th SEC |
| 1987 | John Whited | 10-9 | 5-18 | .526 | 10th SEC |
| 1988 | Mark Connor | 21-29 | 9-18 | .420 | 9th SEC |
| 1989 | Mark Connor | 23-36 | 4-23 | .390 | 10th SEC |
| 1990 | Rod Delmonico | 28-31 | 9-18 | .475 | 9th SEC |
| 1991 | Rod Delmonico | 41-19 | 13-13 | .683 | 7th SEC |
| 1992 | Rod Delmonico | 35-20 | 10-14 | .636 | 5th SEC East |
| 1993 | Rod Delmonico | 45-20 | 20-10 | .692 | 1st SEC East; SEC Tournament Champions |
| 1994 | Rod Delmonico | 52-14 | 24-5 | .788 | SEC Champions; SEC Tournament Champions |
| 1995 | Rod Delmonico | 54-16 | 22-8 | .771 | SEC Champions; SEC Tournament Champions |
| 1996 | Rod Delmonico | 43-20 | 18-12 | .683 | 2nd SEC East |
| 1997 | Rod Delmonico | 42-19 | 17-13 | .688 | T-1st SEC East |
| 1998 | Rod Delmonico | 36-20 | 11-17 | .643 | 4th SEC East |
| 1999 | Rod Delmonico | 28-28 | 10-20 | .500 | 4th SEC East |
| 2000 | Rod Delmonico | 40-23 | 10-18 | .635 | 5th SEC East |
| 2001 | Rod Delmonico | 48-20 | 18-12 | .705 | 2nd SEC East |
| 2002 | Rod Delmonico | 27-28 | 12-18 | .490 | 4th SEC East |
| 2003 | Rod Delmonico | 31-24 | 13-17 | .564 | 4th SEC East |
| 2004 | Rod Delmonico | 38-24 | 14-16 | .613 | 5th SEC East |
| 2005 | Rod Delmonico | 46-21 | 18-11 | .687 | 2nd SEC East |
| 2006 | Rod Delmonico | 31-24 | 11-18 | .564 | 5th SEC East |
| 2007 | Rod Delmonico | 34-25 | 13-15 | .576 | 4th SEC East |
| 2008 | Todd Raleigh | 27-29 | 12-18 | .482 | 6th SEC East |
| 2009 | Todd Raleigh | 26-29 | 11-19 | .473 | 6th SEC East |
| 2010 | Todd Raleigh | 30-26 | 12-18 | .536 | 5th SEC East |
| 2011 | Todd Raleigh | 25-29 | 7-23 | .462 | 6th SEC East |
| 2012 | Dave Serrano | 24-31 | 8-22 | .436 | 6th SEC East |
| 2013 | Dave Serrano | 22-30 | 8-20 | .423 | 6th SEC East |
| 2014 | Dave Serrano | 31-23 | 12-18 | .574 | 5th SEC East |
| 2015 | Dave Serrano | 24-26 | 11-18 | .499 | 6th SEC East |
| 2016 | Dave Serrano | 29–27 | 9-21 | .536 | T-6th SEC East |
| 2017 | Dave Serrano | 27–25 | 7-21 | .519 | 7th SEC East |
| 2018 | Tony Vitello | 29-27 | 12-18 | .518 | T-6th SEC East |
| 2019 | Tony Vitello | 40-21 | 14-16 | .656 | 3rd SEC East |
| 2020 | Tony Vitello | 15–2* | 0-0* | .882 | N/A |
| 2021 | Tony Vitello | 50-18 | 20-10 | .735 | 1st SEC East |
| 2022 | Tony Vitello | 58-9 | 25-5 | .865 | SEC Champions; SEC Tournament Champions |
| 2023 | Tony Vitello | 44-22 | 16-14 | .667 | T-4th SEC East |
| 2024 | Tony Vitello | 60-13 | 22-8 | .821 | SEC Champions; SEC Tournament Champions; National champions |

== NCAA tournament record ==
Year-by-Year Results
| Year | Record | Pct. | Notes |
|---|---|---|---|
| 1951 | 4-2 | .667 | College World Series (Runner-up) |
| 1993 | 1-2 | .333 | Mideast Regional |
| 1994 | 3-2 | .600 | Mideast Regional |
| 1995 | 6-2 | .750 | College World Series (4th place) |
| 1996 | 3-2 | .600 | Atlantic Regional |
| 1997 | 1-2 | .333 | Midwest Regional |
| 2001 | 7-3 | .700 | College World Series (3rd place) |
| 2004 | 1-2 | .333 | Kinston Regional |
| 2005 | 5-2 | .714 | College World Series (8th place) |
| 2019 | 2-2 | .500 | Chapel Hill Regional |
| 2021 | 5-2 | .714 | College World Series (7th place) |
| 2022 | 4-2 | .667 | Knoxville Super Regional |
| 2023 | 6-3 | .667 | College World Series (5th place) |
| 2024 | 9-2 | .818 | College World Series (Champion) |
| 2025 | 3-3 | .500 | Fayetteville Super Regional |
| 2026 | 0-2 | .000 | Chapel Hill Regional |

== Player awards ==
=== National awards ===
- College World Series Most Outstanding Player

Sidney Hatfield (1951)
Dylan Dreiling (2024)

- Collegiate Baseball Newspaper Freshman of the Year Award

R. A. Dickey (1994)
Chase Burns (2022)

- Baseball America Freshman of the Year Award

R. A. Dickey (1994)

- Dick Howser Trophy

Todd Helton (1995)

- Baseball America College Player of the Year Award

Todd Helton (1995)

- Collegiate Baseball Newspaper College Player of the Year Award

Todd Helton (1995)

- Roger Clemens Award

Luke Hochevar (2005)

- NCBWA Freshman National Pitcher of the Year

Chase Burns (2022)

- Collegiate Baseball Co-Freshman National Player of the Year

Chase Burns (2022)

=== SEC Awards ===
- Pitcher of the Year

Luke Hochevar (2005)
Chase Dollander (2022)
Liam Doyle (2025)

- Player of the Year Award

Todd Helton (1995)
Jeff Pickler (1998)
Chris Burke (2001)

- Freshman of the Year

J. P. Arencibia (2005)
Drew Beam (2022)

=== 1st Team All-Americans ===
| Player | Position | Year(s) | Selectors |
|---|---|---|---|
| B.B. Hopkins | Third Base | 1953† | ABCA |
| Sam Ewing | Outfielder | 1970† | ABCA, SN |
| Bobby Tucker | Outfielder | 1973† | ABCA |
| Condredge Holloway | Shortstop | 1975 | SN |
| Rick Honeycutt | First Base | 1976† | ABCA |
| Alan Cockrell | Outfielder | 1984 | SN |
| Doug Hecker | First Base | 1992 | BA |
| R. A. Dickey | Pitcher | 1994†, 1996 | BA, CB |
| Todd Helton | Pitcher/Utility | 1994, 1995 | NCBWA, ABCA, BA |
| Jeff Pickler | Second Base | 1998† | ABCA, BA, CB |
| Chris Burke | Second Base, Shortstop | 2000, 2001† | Baseball Weekly, BA, NCBWA, CB |
| Luke Hochevar | Pitcher | 2005† | ABCA, BA, CB, NCBWA, Baseball Weekly |
| J. P. Arencibia | Catcher | 2006 | College Baseball Foundation |
| Chase Burns | Pitcher | 2022 | NCBWA |
| Chase Dollander | Pitcher | 2022† | ABCA, BA, D1Baseball, Perfect Game, NCBWA |
| Drew Gilbert | Outfielder | 2022 | NCBWA |
| Trey Lipscomb | Third Base | 2022 | NCBWA |
| Blake Burke | First Base | 2024 | ABCA, BA, D1Baseball, NCBWA, Perfect Game |
| Christian Moore | Second Base | 2024 | BA, D1Baseball, Perfect Game |
Source:"SEC All-Americas". secsports.com. Archived from the original on May 28, 2008. ABCA: American Baseball Coaches Association BA: Baseball America CB: Collegiate Baseball NCBWA: National Collegiate Baseball Writers Association † Denotes consensus All-American

== Notable former players ==
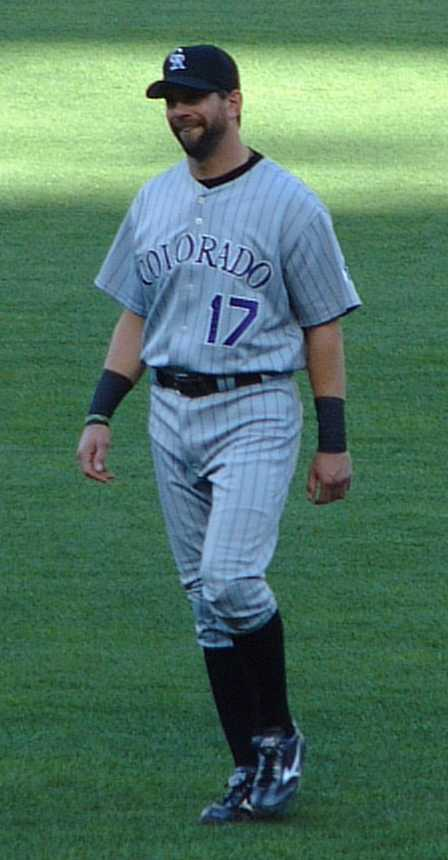
Todd Helton

=== Active Major League players ===
- Jordan Beck
- Chase Burns
- Garrett Crochet
- Chad Dallas
- Chase Dollander
- Drew Gilbert
- Seth Halvorsen
- Ben Joyce
- Christian Moore
- Trey Lipscomb
- Chase Silseth
- Garrett Stallings
- Blade Tidwell

=== Others ===
- James Adkins
- J. P. Arencibia
- Ed Bailey
- Julio Borbon
- Chris Burke
- Tommy Bridges
- Frank Callaway
- Alan Cockrell
- Kentrail Davis
- Rich DeLucia
- R. A. Dickey
- Mike DiFelice
- Matt Duffy
- Sam Ewing
- Phil Garner
- Zack Godley
- Yan Gomes
- Chase Headley
- Deunte Heath
- Bronson Heflin
- Todd Helton
- Luke Hochevar
- Rick Honeycutt
- Luke Hudson
- Mike Lincoln
- Greg McMichael
- Augie Ojeda
- Matt Ramsey
- Joe Randa
- Rich Rodriguez
- Steve Searcy
- Nick Senzel
- Mike Smithson
- Drew Steckenrider
- Christin Stewart
- Andrew Toles
- Bubba Trammell

== See also ==
- List of NCAA Division I baseball programs
