= Rod Delmonico =

American baseball coach (born 1958)

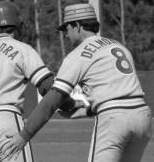
- Delmonico with Florida State in 1985

Biographical details
- Born: May 14, 1958 (age 68); Wilmington, North Carolina, U.S.
- Education: Liberty University; Clemson University

Playing career
- 1977: Liberty (baseball)
- 1978: Liberty (soccer)

Coaching career (HC unless noted)
- 1981: Gloucester County College (assistant)
- 1982–1983: Clemson (assistant)
- 1984–1989: Florida State (assistant)
- 1990–2007: Tennessee
- 2008: Florida State (assistant)
- 2009: FIU (assistant)

Head coaching record
- Overall: 699–396

Accomplishments and honors

Championships
- 3× SEC Regular season (1993, 1994, 1995); 3× SEC Tournament (1993, 1994, 1995)

Awards
- Baseball America College Coach of the Year Award (1995)

Rodney James Delmonico (born May 14, 1958) is an American college baseball coach. He served as head coach of the Tennessee Volunteers of the University of Tennessee from 1990 through 2007, and for the Netherlands national baseball team in the 2009 World Baseball Classic.

== Early life ==
Born in Wilmington, North Carolina, Delmonico graduated from New Hanover High School in 1976 and Liberty University in 1980 with a bachelor's degree in physical education. He lettered in baseball and soccer. He holds a master's degree from Clemson University in education administration.

== Coaching career ==
Delmonico was an assistant coach at Gloucester County College in 1980, graduate assistant coach at Clemson from 1981 to 1983, and assistant coach at Florida State University from 1984 to 1989.

Delmonico was head coach of the Tennessee Volunteers baseball team from 1990 until 2007, when he was released from his contract. He returned to Florida State as a volunteer assistant coach, then joined Florida International University as an assistant coach in July 2008. He was named manager of the Netherlands national team in late 2008 and managed the team in the 2009 World Baseball Classic. He was known as one of the most influential hitting gurus of the SEC.

== Personal life ==
Delmonico is divorced. They have three sons, who all played competitive baseball. Their son Tony played for his father at Tennessee and played in the Los Angeles Dodgers organization and their son Nicky played in Major League Baseball for the Chicago White Sox.
