= Pride of the Southland Band =

Marching band at the University of Tennessee

The University of Tennessee Pride of the Southland Marching Band
- School: University of Tennessee
- Location: Knoxville, TN
- Conference: SEC
- Founded: 1869
- Director: Michael Stewart
- Associate Director: Fuller Lyon
- Members: 415
- Fight song: "Down the Field"
- Website: utbands.utk.edu

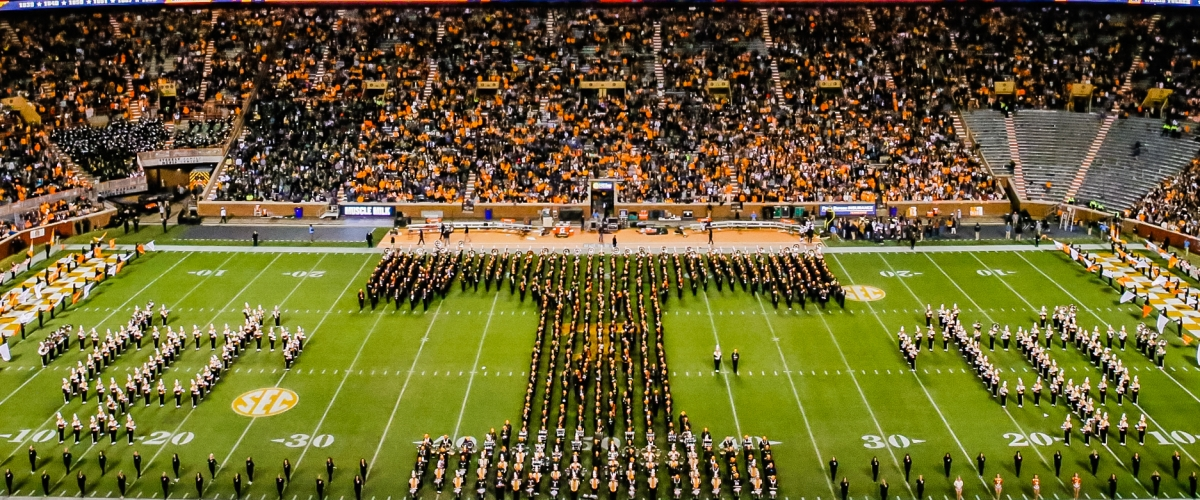
The Pride of the Southland and Alumni Band in 2022.

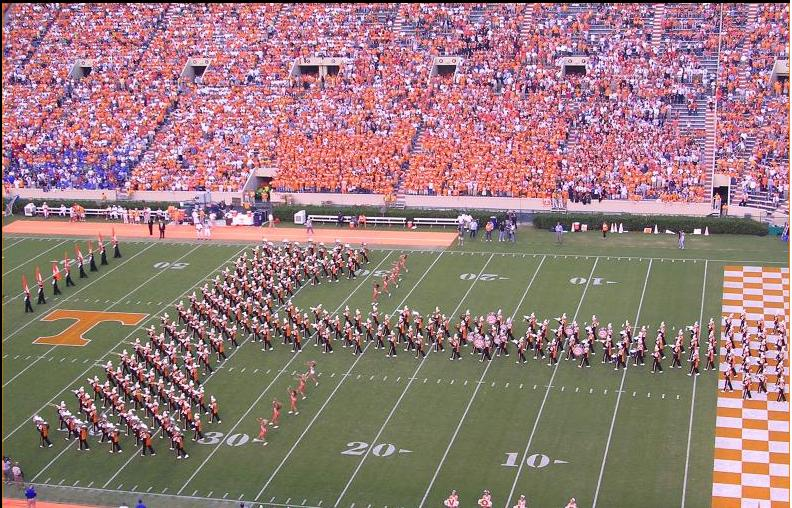
The Pride of the Southland in the Power T.

The Pride of the Southland Band is the marching band of the University of Tennessee in Knoxville, Tennessee. The band performs at all Tennessee home football games and some away games. The Pride of the Southland is recognized as one of the nation's top collegiate marching bands.

== History ==
One of the country's oldest collegiate band programs, the University of Tennessee band was founded in 1869 as part of the Military Department, forerunner to the school's ROTC program. Its instrumentation in 1883 was entirely made up of cornets. The band grew to between 13 and 17 members, and in 1892, it was reorganized under Ernest H. Garratt. The band wore West Point-style uniforms like the rest of the cadets in the Military Department and had a more varied repertoire of instruments, including a clarinet.

At the turn of the twentieth century, William A. Knabe was appointed as the first full-time band director. (Garratt had also served as an organist, choirmaster, musical director, and director of the Glee Club.) The band is first documented as playing at a football game in 1902, a game that Tennessee won.

By 1917, the band had changed to World War I-style uniforms and doubled in size. The band grew along with the military units on campus. By 1935, the band boasted 85 members. It remained all male due to the band’s continued association with the Military Department. In 1937, a female contingent called the "Volettes" began performing with the band. Its membership ranged from 50 to 90.

The 1940s brought women into the band. Two of the first women to play with the band were Martha Carroll, who played the lyre, and Marjorie Abbott, a marimba player. By 1946, women outnumbered the male members of the band, due to World War II and the death of male students. By 1949, the band was once again all male, but retained female majorettes. Major Walter Ryba was properties master for the Army and Air Force ROTC at Knoxville and also for the Army ROTC at the UT-Martin campus.

The band members decided to name themselves "Pride of the Southland" on the morning of October 15, 1949, as they stood around on the sidelines at Legion Field in Birmingham, Alabama, waiting for Alabama's Million Dollar Band, under the direction of "Colonel" Butler, to finish its practice. That afternoon, as the band came out on the field, they were introduced to the 44,000 attendees plus listeners on the radio as "Presenting The University of Tennessee's Pride of the Southland Band under the direction of 'Major' Walter M. Ryba". It was generally believed that Ryba did not know ahead of time that he was receiving a "commission".

In 1961, Tennessee native W J Julian (1922–2015) was hired as an associate professor and director of the UT bands. Under Julian's leadership the band grew in size, prestige, and reputation. The band was removed from the ROTC department and placed under the Music Education Department. Julian designed the band’s navy blue, orange, white, and cream-colored uniforms, which paid homage to the band’s military past and are still in use. Some of the traditions established under Julian's direction are: the band's signature "Big Orange Sound"; its pregame formations; forming the T for the team to run through; playing Rocky Top; and Circle Drills, a geometric and kaleidoscopic drill concept from which many drills were derived during his and his immediate successors' tenures. Julian retired in 1993.

The band has represented the state of Tennessee in 13 presidential inaugurations and at the many bowl games the Vol football team has traveled to. Due to Julian's influence, the Pride is one of only two SEC bands with a strutting Big Ten-style drum major.

In March 2007, The Pride traveled to Dublin, Ireland, to play at various concerts and in the St. Patrick's Day Parade.

On October 14, 2013, university officials placed Director of Bands Gary Sousa on administrative leave and removed him from his post after a public confrontation with the UT Athletic Department. Donald Ryder was appointed interim Director of Bands, and Michael Stewart was appointed interim Associate Director. On January 29, 2015, it was announced that Ryder would serve as Director of Bands and W J Julian Professor of Music, and Stewart would serve as Associate Director of Bands.

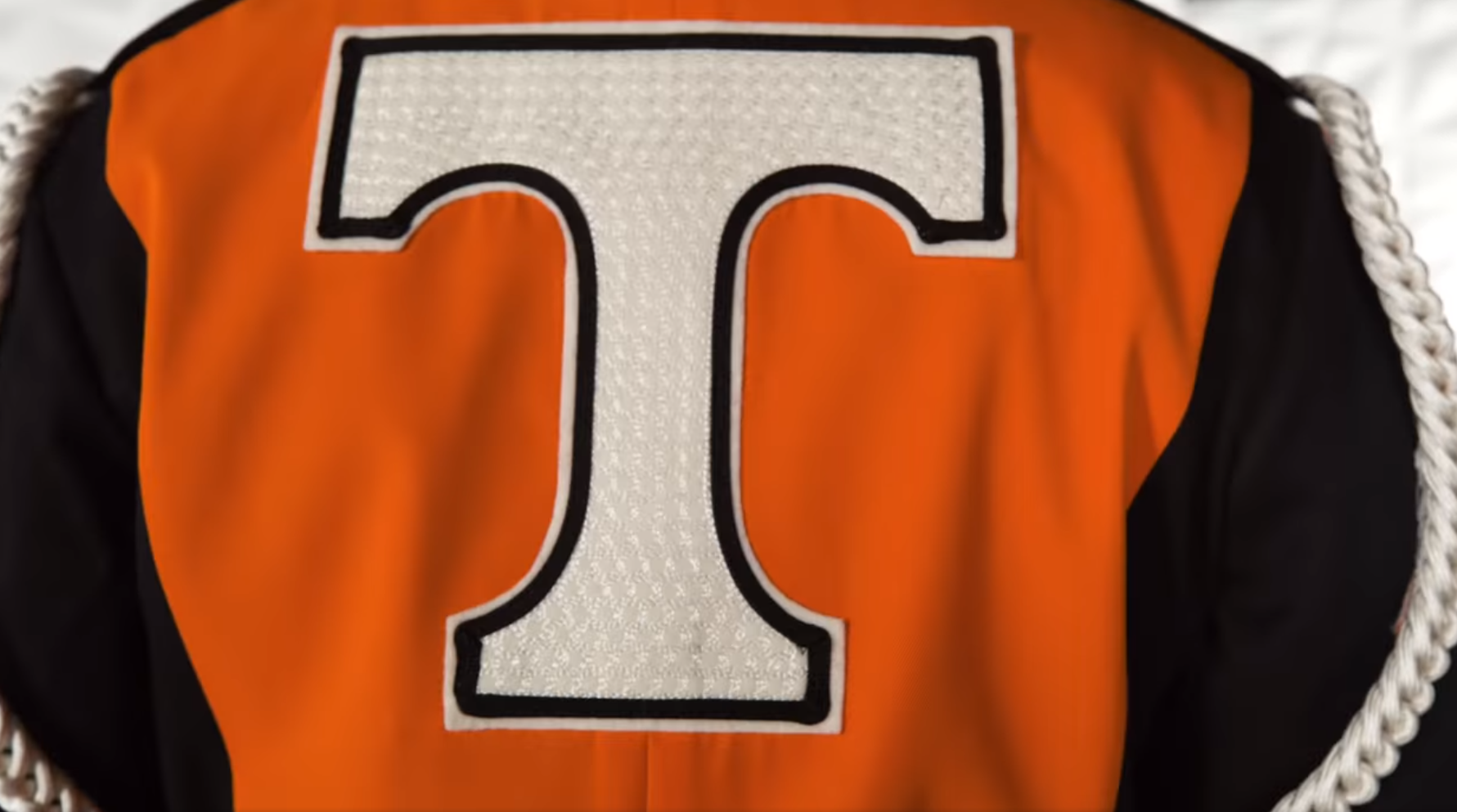
A close up of the Power T on the back of the new uniforms.

In March 2022, Donald Ryder retired from his position as Director of Bands, and Michael Stewart took his place as the new director of the Pride of the Southland, with Fuller Lyon serving as the Associate Director of Marching & Athletic Bands, and new hire John Zastoupil taking over the title of Director of Bands.

In October 2023, the Pride of the Southland Band debuted a new logo and new uniforms. The uniforms maintained the overall look from the previous sixty-year-old "military-style" uniforms, but slightly updated for the modern age. The previous "Block T" on the back cape portion was updated to reflect the Power T that is used across the UT Campus.

== Traditions ==
=== Personnel and field presence ===
The UT Marching Band is an entirely mobile unit; its halftime complement usually includes around 310 wind instruments (necessitated by the optimal number of people to create the geometry of circle drills); a line of non-pitched and indefinite pitched percussion (pitched percussion instruments like bells and xylophones are not utilized, nor is sideline, front ensemble, or "pit" percussion); 24 or 32 color guard; 10 majorettes; and one drum major. The UT band customarily enters the field live, playing music from the initial step-off from the sideline; it also exits the field live, most often to the music of the "Tennessee Waltz March."

=== Pregame ===
https://www.youtube.com/watch?v=FzX1CrhJ2iY&t=6s The Pride's pregame show was designed by Julian with musical arrangements by Warren Clark and Barry McDonald. This six-minute-and-forty-five second show has remained largely unchanged since the 1960s. It begins with the drumline starting off a cadence as the band marches onto the field. Then, part of the "Tennessee Waltz March," a march version of the "Tennessee Waltz" in common time, is played as the band forms a block formation. The band then plays the National Anthem in this formation. Then the full version of the "Tennessee Waltz March" followed by, starting in the 2007 season, a march version of Alabama's "Tennessee River", then the "Alma Mater March". As they march back playing the "Alma Mater March," they spell out VOLS. Then the visiting team's fight song is played in the direction of the opposing team's band and student section. After this, the band forms the traditional interlocking "U" and "T" and marches this across the majority of the field accompanied by "Rocky Top". Then the "Power T" is formed while "Spirit of the Hill" is played. Once the "Power T" is formed, all the Vols fans are asked to join in the Volunteer Wave and the crowd spells out "V-O-L-S" and chant "Go Vols Go!" Then the Pride of the Southland's Drum Major runs through the middle of this formation. The band then marches across the field until it reaches the opposite end zone. At this point, "Stars and Stripes Forever" is played and the band forms a large "USA" to the visiting sideline, then inverts the form to face the front sideline. The band then plays "Fight Vols Fight" as they form the giant T formation which then opens up as the football team runs through while "Down the Field" is played. The band then turns and marches off the field to "Fight Vols Fight" while keeping the T formation.

Although the T formation is used almost exclusively at UT home games in Neyland Stadium, it has been done at other venues, most notably at the 1986 and 1991 Sugar Bowl.

=== Rocky Top ===
5 min video of UT Pregame

External videos
- Rocky Top

Julian introduced "Rocky Top" in a halftime show in 1972, after which it made its way to the stands. The song has become so closely identified with the Vols that many believe it to be the school's official fight song. Indeed, an early version of the SEC's Web site included a recording of "Rocky Top" as Tennessee's fight song. However, Tennessee's official fight song is "Down the Field."

"Rocky Top" was written by Felice and Boudleaux Bryant in 1967 and recorded by the Osborne Brothers that same year.

=== Spirit of the Hill ===
The oldest tradition of the Pride of the Southland comes at the end of every home halftime show where the Pride plays Spirit of the Hill and forms an interlocking UT with the year 1794 or, more recently, on one side of the field a U and on the other side a T, on the field from 2010 to 2015. The year 1794 returned in 2016. This is the longest-lasting tradition of the band dating back more than a hundred years.

=== Alma Mater ===
External audio
- UT Alma Mater

After forming the interlocking UT at the end of every home halftime show, the Pride plays the Alma Mater. UT's Alma Mater was officially adopted in 1928 after a yearlong contest sponsored by the school's musical organizations. A Chattanoogan, Mary Fleming Meek, won the $50 prize with her song entitled "On a Hallowed Hill." Although Mrs. Meek was not an alumna of UT, both her husband, John Lamar Meek, and her son were graduates, and her father was a former trustee of the university. Another tradition of the Pride is to interlock arms and sing the Alma Mater before marching to the stadium for every home football game.

=== Salute to the Hill ===
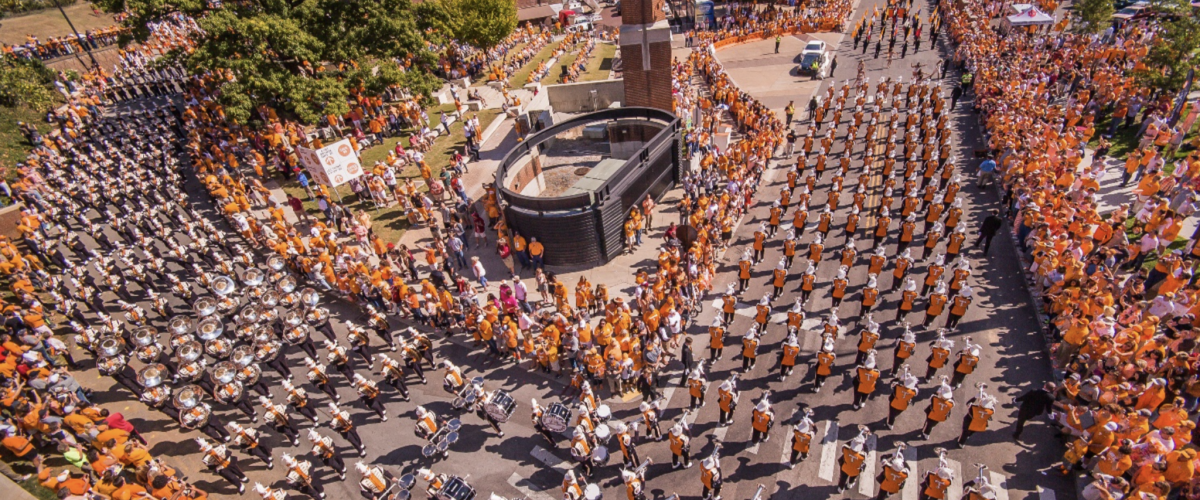
The Pride's Salute to the Hill.

At every home game, the Pride performs the "March to the Stadium", which includes a parade to the bottom of "The Hill", the oldest section of campus, which sits upon the tallest hill next to Neyland Stadium. There the band performs the "Salute to The Hill", a homage to the history and legacy of the University. The parade begins an hour and forty minutes before kickoff.

=== Presidential inaugurations ===
With the exception of 2013, Pride of the Southland has represented the state of Tennessee for all presidential inaugurations since 1953, the most of any non-military band.

=== 150th Anniversary ===
The 2019 football season marked the 150th anniversary of the Pride of the Southland Band. Custom drum heads with the logo shown were placed in the bass drums for all 2019 shows, and a gala was held on Homecoming weekend at the Knoxville Convention Center for alumni and family, with special appearances by Lee Greenwood and the 2019 Pride of the Southland Marching Band.
