= Todd Raleigh =

American baseball player and coach (born 1969)

Biographical details
- Born: March 27, 1969 (age 57); Swanton, Vermont, U.S.

Playing career
- 1988–1991: Western Carolina
- Position: Catcher

Coaching career (HC unless noted)
- 1992: Vermont (Asst.)
- 1993–1994: Western Carolina (Asst.)
- 1995: Belmont Abbey (Asst.)
- 1996–1998: James Madison (Asst.)
- 1999: East Carolina (Asst.)
- 2000–2007: Western Carolina
- 2008–2011: Tennessee

Head coaching record
- Overall: 365–322

Accomplishments and honors

Championships
- SoCon Regular season: 2003, 2007; SoCon Tournament: 2003

Awards
- SoCon Coach of the Year: 2002, 2007

Todd Raleigh (born March 27, 1969) is an American collegiate baseball coach who led the Tennessee Volunteers baseball team for the 2008–2011 seasons. Prior to that position, he was the head coach at Western Carolina, his alma mater.

Raleigh's son is Major League Baseball player Cal Raleigh. His brother Matt Raleigh played minor league baseball from 1992 to 2000.

In the 2025 Major League Baseball Home Run Derby, Raleigh pitched to his son, Cal, with his younger son, Todd, catching. Cal won the derby after hitting a total of 54 home runs.

== Year-by-year head coaching record ==
Record table
Season	Team	Overall	Conference	Standing	Postseason
Western Carolina (Southern Conference) (2000–2007)
2000	Western Carolina	15–38	8–22	10th	
2001	Western Carolina	30–26	18–11	T-3rd	SoCon tournament
2002	Western Carolina	33–23	20–10	2nd	SoCon tournament
2003	Western Carolina	43–21	22–8	1st	Wilson Regional
2004	Western Carolina	28–31	12–18	8th	SoCon tournament
2005	Western Carolina	33–23	18–12	T-3rd	SoCon tournament
2006	Western Carolina	33–27	14–13	6th	SoCon tournament
2007	Western Carolina	42–20	20–7	T-1st	Chapel Hill Regional
Western Carolina:		257–209 (.552)	132–101 (.567)		
Tennessee (Southeastern Conference) (2008–2011)
2008	Tennessee	27–29	12–18	5th (East)	
2009	Tennessee	26–29	11–19	6th (East)	
2010	Tennessee	30–26	12–18	5th (East)	
2011	Tennessee	25–29	7–23	6th (East)	
Tennessee:		108–113 (.489)	42–78 (.350)		
Total:		365–322 (.531)			
National champion Postseason invitational champion Conference regular season champion Conference regular season and conference tournament champion Division regular season champion Division regular season and conference tournament champion Conference tournament champion
