= 2023 USC Trojans baseball team =

2023 season of the University of Southern California baseball team

2023 USC Trojans baseball
- Conference: Pac-12 Conference
- Record: 34–22–1 (17–13 Pac-12)
- Head coach: Andy Stankiewicz (1st season)
- Assistant coaches: Andy Jenkins (1st season); Seth Etherton (1st season); Travis Jewett (1st season)
- Home stadium: Dedeaux Field (Compacity: 2,500)

2023 Pac-12 Conference baseball standings
| | Conf. | | | | | | Overall |
| Team | W | | L | | T | PCT | W | | L | | T | PCT |
|---|---|---|---|---|---|---|---|---|---|---|---|---|
| No. 4 Stanford ‍†‍‍^{y} | 23 | – | 7 | – | 0 | .767 | 38 | – | 16 | – | 0 | .704 |
| No. 23 Oregon State ‍‍‍^{y} | 18 | – | 12 | – | 0 | .600 | 39 | – | 18 | – | 0 | .684 |
| Washington ‍‍‍^{y} | 17 | – | 12 | – | 0 | .586 | 35 | – | 18 | – | 0 | .660 |
| USC ‍‍‍ | 17 | – | 13 | – | 0 | .567 | 34 | – | 23 | – | 1 | .595 |
| Arizona State ‍‍‍ | 16 | – | 13 | – | 0 | .552 | 32 | – | 23 | – | 0 | .582 |
| No. 12 Oregon ‍‍‡‍^{y} | 16 | – | 14 | – | 0 | .533 | 38 | – | 20 | – | 0 | .655 |
| UCLA ‍‍‍ | 12 | – | 16 | – | 1 | .431 | 28 | – | 24 | – | 1 | .538 |
| Arizona ‍‍‍^{y} | 12 | – | 18 | – | 0 | .400 | 33 | – | 24 | – | 0 | .579 |
| California ‍‍‍ | 12 | – | 18 | – | 0 | .400 | 24 | – | 28 | – | 0 | .462 |
| Washington State ‍‍‍ | 10 | – | 19 | – | 0 | .345 | 29 | – | 23 | – | 0 | .558 |
| Utah ‍‍‍ | 9 | – | 20 | – | 1 | .317 | 22 | – | 32 | – | 1 | .409 |
† – Conference champion ‡ – Tournament champion y – Invited to the NCAA Division I Baseball Championship; As of May 30, 2023; Rankings from D1Baseball

The 2023 USC Trojans baseball team represented the University of Southern California during the 2023 NCAA Division I baseball season. The Trojans played their home games for the 49th season at Dedeaux Field. The team was coached by Andy Stankiewicz in his 1st season at USC.

== Previous season ==
The Trojans ended the 2022 season with a record of 8–22 in conference play and 25–28 overall record good for last place in the Pac-12. That season is one of the worst seasons in Trojan baseball history.

=== 2022 MLB draft ===
The Trojans had four players drafted in the 2022 MLB draft.

| Player | Position | Round | Overall | MLB team |
|---|---|---|---|---|
| D'Andre Smith | 2B | 5th | 149 | New York Mets |
| Matt Keating | P | 9th | 280 | New York Yankees |
| Rhylan Thomas | OF | 11th | 337 | New York Mets |
| Tyresse Turner | SS | 13th | 391 | Cleveland Guardians |

== Roster ==
2023 USC Trojans roster
| Pitchers: 11 – Michael Ebner – Freshmen; 12 – Caden Aoki – Sophomore; 14 – Channing Austin – Junior; 18 – Josh Blum – Sophomore; 20 – Ethan Hoopingarner – Senior; 22 – Michael Ryhlick – Senior; 23 – Eddie Mgdesyan – Freshman; 24 – Tyler Stromsborg – Junior; 25 – Fisher Johnson – Sophomore; 30 – Garrett Clarke – (redshirt) Senior; 31 – Eric Hammond – (redshirt) Freshman; 32 – Caden Connolly – Sophomore; 38 – Toby Spach – (redshirt) Senior; 39 – Jason Starrels – (redshirt) Senior; 44 – Kyle Wisch – (redshirt) Junior; 45 – Jaden Agassi – Junior; 47 – Blake Sodersten – Senior; 51 – Evan Clark – Sophomore | Catchers: 5 – Connor Clift – Senior; 26 – Luca DiPaolo – Freshman; 29 – Connor Aoki – Senior; 40 – Jacob Galloway – Freshman; Infielders: 2 – KaiKea Harrison – Freshman; 3 – Caiden Huber – (redshirt) Freshman; 4 – Johnny Olmstead – Senior; 13 – Ryan Jackson – Junior; 27 – Bryce Martin-Grudzielanek – (redshirt) Freshman; 36 – Nick Lopez – Senior | Outfielders: 6 – Cole Gabrielson – Senior; 9 – Carson Wells – Junior; 10 – Austin Overn – Freshman; 16 – Caleb Brandon – Freshman; 21 – Adrian Colon-Rosado – Senior | Two Way Players: 8 – Nate Clow – Junior; 15 – Ethan Hedges – Freshman |

=== Coaches ===
2023 USC Trojans baseball coaching staff
- Andy Stankiewicz – Head coach – 1st season
- Travis Jewett – Assistant coach – 1st season
- Seth Etherton – Assistant coach – 1st season
- Andy Jenkins – Assistant coach – 1st season

Note: Season counter accounts for all stints at USC.

== Pac-12 Media Poll ==
Pac–12 media poll
| Predicted finish | Team | Votes (1st place) |
| 1 | Stanford | 99 (9) |
| 2 | UCLA | 90 (2) |
| 3 | Oregon State | 77 |
| 4 | Arizona | 74 |
| 5 | Oregon | 68 |
| 6 | Arizona State | 45 |
| 7 | Washington | 43 |
| 8 | California | 40 |
| 9 | Washington State | 29 |
| 10 | USC | 24 |
| 11 | Utah | 16 |

=== Opening day ===
Opening Day Starters
| Name | Position |
|---|---|
| Johnny Olmstead | 3rd Baseman |
| Carson Wells | Left fielder |
| Cole Gabrielson | Right fielder |
| Connor Aoki | Catcher |
| Bryce Martin-Gurdzielanek | Designated hitter |
| Nick Lopez | 1st Baseman |
| Ryan Jackson | 2nd Baseman |
| Austin Overn | Center fielder |
| Caiden Huber | Shortstop |
| Tyler Stromsborg | Pitcher |

== Schedule ==
2023 USC Trojans game log (34–22–1)
Regular Season: 33–22–1 (Home: 26–6; Away: 6–15–1; Neutral: 1–1)

February: 3–3–1
| Game | Date | Rank | Opponent | Stadium | Score | Win | Loss | Save | Attendance | Overall | Pac-12 |
|---|---|---|---|---|---|---|---|---|---|---|---|
| 1 | February 17 | | Marist* | Dedeaux Field; Los Angeles, California | 8–6 | **Garrett Clarke (1–0)** | Kmietek Zane (0–1) | **Kyle Wisch (1)** | 873 | 1–0 | – |
| 2 | February 18 | | Marist* | Dedeaux Field; Los Angeles, California | 17–4 | **Jorden Agassi (1–0)** | Brian Yetter (0–1) | — | 487 | 2–0 | – |
| 3 | February 19 | | Marist* | Dedeaux Field; Los Angeles, California | 12–2 | **Blake Sodersten (1–0)** | John Hacker (0–1) | — | 432 | 3–0 | – |
| 4 | February 21 | | UC Irvine* | Dedeaux Field; Los Angeles, California | 7–8 | Finnegan Wall (1–0) | **Toby Spach (0–1)** | Max Marin (1) | 433 | 3–1 | – |
| 5 | February 24 | | at #17 Auburn* | Plainsman Park; Auburn, Alabama | 3–5 | John Armstrong (1–0) | **Tyler Stromsborg (0–1)** | Will Cannon (1) | 2,809 | 3–2 | – |
| 6 | February 25 | | at #17 Auburn* | Plainsman Park; Auburn, Alabama | 6–12 | John Armstrong (2–0) | **Fisher Johnson (0–1)** | Will Cannon (2) | 3,319 | 3–3 | – |
| 7 | February 26 | | at #17 Auburn* | Plainsman Park; Auburn, Alabama | 12–12 | – | – | – | 2,813 | 3–3–1 | **The Game ended after 9 Innings due to travel restrictions due to rain** |

March: 11–7
| Game | Date | Rank | Opponent | Stadium | Score | Win | Loss | Save | Attendance | Overall | Pac-12 |
|---|---|---|---|---|---|---|---|---|---|---|---|
| 8 | March 1 | | UC Riverside* | Dedeaux Field; Los Angeles, California | 5–6 | Caleb Turner (1–0) | **Blake Sodersten (1–1)** | Tyler Frazier (1) | 179 | 3–4–1 | – |
| 9 | March 3 | | Sacramento State*; Southern California College Baseball Classic | Dedeaux Field; Los Angeles, California | 8–7 | **Josh Blum (1–0)** | Trey Goodrich (0–1) | **Caden Connolly (1)** | 412 | 4–4–1 | – |
| 10 | March 4 | | Tulane*; Southern California College Baseball Classic | Dedeaux Field; Los Angeles, California | 13–8 | **Jason Starrels (1–0)** | Cristian Sanchez (0–1) | – | 532 | 5–4–1 | – |
| 11 | March 5 | | at #12 UCLA* rivalry Southern California College Baseball Classic | Jackie Robinson Stadium; Los Angeles, California | 3–5 | Jake Saum (1–0) | **Eric Hammond (0–1)** | – | 1,845 | 5–5–1 | – |
| 12 | March 8 | | Nevada* | Dedeaux Field; Los Angeles, California | 2–3 | Payton Stumbo (1–1) | **Fisher Johnson (0–2)** | Kolby Kmetko (3) | 202 | 5–6–1 | – |
| 13 | March 11 | | #2 Stanford (Doubleheader) | Dedeaux Field; Los Angeles, California | 4–6 | Quinn Mathews (3–1) | **Caden Connolly (0–1)** | Drew Dowd (1) | 523 | 5–7–1 | 0–1 |
| 14 | March 11 | | #2 Stanford (Doubleheader) | Dedeaux Field; Los Angeles, California | 10–7 | **Josh Blum (2–0)** | Nicolas Lopez (2–1) | **Garrett Clarke (1)** | 431 | 6–7–1 | 1–1 |
| 15 | March 12 | | #2 Stanford | Dedeaux Field; Los Angeles, California | 4–1 | **Fisher Johnson (1–2)** | Drew Dowd (0–1) | **Gerrett Clarke (2)** | 708 | 7–7–1 | 2–1 |
| 16 | March 15 | | at Cal Poly* | Baggett Stadium; San Luis Obispo, California | 16–3 | **Blake Sodersten (2–1)** | Charlie Royle (0–1) | – | 1,526 | 8–7–1 | 2–1 |
| 17 | March 17 | | at California | Stu Gordon Stadium; Berkeley, California | 5–3 | **Tyler Stromsborg (1–1)** | Daniel Colwell (1–2) | **Garrett Clarke (3)** | 1,336 | 9–7–1 | 3–1 |
| 18 | March 18 | | at California (Doubleheader) | Stu Gordon Stadium; Berkeley, California | 7–8; 10 | Bougie Tucker (2–1) | **Garrett Clarke (1–1)** | – | 602 | 9–8–1 | 3–2 |
| 19 | March 18 | | at California (Dubleheader) | Stu Gordon Stadium; Berkeley, California | 8–7 | **Fisher Johnson (2–2)** | Connor Sullivan (1–2) | **Kyle Wisch (2)** | 349 | 10–8–1 | 4–2 |
| 20 | March 22 | | Seattle* | Dedeaux Field; Los Angeles, California | 9–4 | **Toby Spach (1–1)** | Blake Leaverton (0–1) | – | 211 | 11–8–1 | 4–2 |
| 21 | March 24 | | Washington State | Dedeaux Field; Los Angeles, California | 13–3 | **Tyler Stromsborg (2–1)** | Dakota Hawkins (2–3) | – | 323 | 12–8–1 | 5–2 |
| 22 | March 25 | | Washington State | Dedeaux Field; Los Angeles, California | 6–1 | **Caden Connolly (1–1)** | Grant Taylor (1–1) | – | 638 | 13–8–1 | 6–2 |
| 23 | March 26 | | Washington State | Dedeaux Field; Los Angeles, California | 6–3 | **Eric Hammond (1–1)** | Caden Kaelber (3–1) | **Garrett Clarke (4)** | 527 | 14–8–1 | 7–2 |
| 24 | March 28 | | at UC Irvine* | Anteater Ballpark; Irvine, California | 4–5; 10 | Max Martn (1–0) | **Garrett Clarke (1–2)** | – | 966 | 14–9–1 | 7–2 |
| 25 | March 30 | | at Utah | Miller Park; Provo, Utah | 4–0 | **Tyler Stromsborg (3–1)** | E. Canchola-Lugo (2–1) | – | 238 | 15–9–1 | 8–2 |

April: 10–8
| Game | Date | Rank | Opponent | Stadium | Score | Win | Loss | Save | Attendance | Overall | Pac-12 |
|---|---|---|---|---|---|---|---|---|---|---|---|
| 26 | April 1 | | at Utah | Smith's Ballpark; Salt Lake City, Utah | 10–0 | **Caden Aoki (1–0)** | Bryson Van Sickle (2–3) | – | 1,665 | 16–9–1 | 9–2 |
| 27 | April 2 | | at Utah | Smith's Ballpark; Salt Lake City, Utah | 3–8 | Merit Jones (2–1) | **Eric Hammond (1–2)** | – | 1,571 | 16–10–1 | 9–3 |
| 28 | April 4 | | Loyola Marymount* | Dedeaux Field; Los Angeles, California | 11–9 | **Josh Blum (3–0)** | Will Grimm (1–1) | **Kyle Wisch (3)** | 355 | 17–10–1 | 9–3 |
| 29 | April 6 | #25 | San Diego State* | Dedeaux Field; Los Angeles, California | 12–2 | **Tyler Stromsborg (4–1)** | Omar Serrano (0–3) | – | 369 | 18–10–1 | 9–3 |
| 30 | April 7 | #25 | San Diego State* | Dedeaux Field; Los Angeles, California | 7–2 | **Caden AOki (2–0)** | TJ Foundtain (3–2) | – | 824 | 19–10–1 | 9–3 |
| 31 | April 8 | #25 | San Diego State* | Dedeaux Field; Los Angeles, California | 7–0 | **Eric Hammond (2–2)** | Chris Canada (1–3) | – | 713 | 20–10–1 | 9–3 |
| 32 | April 11 | #21 | Cal State Fullerton* | Dedeaux Field; Los Angeles, California | 4–3 | **Kyle Wisch (1–0)** | Jojo Ingrassia (3–1) | **Garrett Clarke (5)** | 398 | 21–10–1 | 9–3 |
| 33 | April 14 | | at Oregon State | Goss Stadium at Coleman Field; Corvallis, Oregon | 4–10 | Trent Sellers (5_3) | **Tyler Stromsborg (4–2)** | Ryan Brown (7) | 3,719 | 21–11–1 | 9–4 |
| 34 | April 15 | | at Oregon State | Gross Stadium at Coleman Field; Corvallis, Oregon | 2–3; 13 | Ran Brown (3–0) | **Fisher Johnson (2–3)** | – | 3,992 | 21–12–1 | 9–5 |
| 35 | April 16 | | at Oregon State | Gross Stadium att Coleman Field; Corvallis, Oregon | 3–6 | AJ Lattery (4–0) | **Eric Hammond (2–3)** | Ben Ferrer (1) | 3,539 | 21–13–1 | 9–6 |
| 36 | April 18 | | Cal State Northridge* | Dedeaux Field; Los Angeles, California | 8–5 | **Toby Spach (2–1)** | Eenji Pallares (4–3) | **Kyle Wisch (4)** | 376 | 22–13–1 | 9–6 |
| 37 | April 21 | | #22 UCLA; Rivalry | Dedeaux Field; Los Angeles, California | 3–9 | Jake Brooks (5–3) | **Tyler Stromsborg (4–3)** | – | 2,057 | 22–14–1 | 9–7 |
| 38 | April 22 | | #22 UCLA; Rivalry | Dedeaux Field; Los Angeles, California | 5–1 | **Caden Aoki (3–0)** | Alonzo Tredwell (4–2) | – | 1,577 | 23–14–1 | 10–7 |
| 39 | April 23 | | #22 UCLA; Rivalry | Dedeaux Field; Los Angeles, California | 6–5 | **Garrett Clarke (2–2)** | Cody Delvecchio (1–2) | – | 1,882 | 24–14–1 | 11–7 |
| 40 | April 25 | | UC San Diego* | Dedeaux Field; Los Angeles, California | 4–3 | **Fisher Johnson (3–3)** | Donovan Chriss (1–2) | **Garrett Clark (6)** | 289 | 25–14–1 | 11–7 |
| 41 | April 28 | | at Washington | Husky Ballpark; Seattle, Washington | 12–14; 10 | Josh Emanuels (3–2) | **Garrett Clarke (2–3)** | – | 1,418 | 25–15–1 | 11–8 |
| 42 | April 29 | | at Washington | Husky Ballpark; Seattle Washington | 6–7 | Grant Cunningham (1–2) | **Kyle Wisch (0–1)** | Josh Emanuels (4) | 1,687 | 25–16–1 | 11–9 |
| 43 | April 30 | | at Washington | Husky Ballpark; Seattle, Washington | 1–4 | Jared Engman (3–3) | **Blake Sodersten (2–2)** | Josh Emaunels (5) | 1,753 | 25–17–1 | 11–10 |

May: 8–4
| Game | Date | Rank | Opponent | Stadium | Score | Win | Loss | Save | Attendance | Overall | Pac-12 |
|---|---|---|---|---|---|---|---|---|---|---|---|
| 44 | May 2 | | Long Beach State* | Angel Stadium; Anaheim, California | 4–8 | Jake Rons (1–1) | **Jaden Agassi (1–1)** | – | 3,488 | 25–18–1 | 11–10 |
| 45 | May 3 Rescheduled from February 28th | | at #24 Cal State Fullerton* | Goodwin Field; Fullerton, California | 2–4 | Seth Tomczak (2–0) | **Eric Hammond (2–4)** | Jojo Ingrassia (5) | 1,624 | 25–19–1 | 11–10 |
| 46 | May 5 | | #17 Oregon | Dedeaux Field; Los Angeles, California | 7–2 | **Blake Sodersten (3–2)** | Leo Uelmen (3–4) | – | 2,105 | 26–19–1 | 12–10 |
| 47 | May 6 | | #17 Oregon | Dedeaux Field; Los Angeles, California | 5–7 | Matt Dallas (6–1) | **Caden Aoki (3–1)** | Josh Mollerus (8) | 879 | 26–20–1 | 12–11 |
| 48 | May 7 | | #17 Oregon | Dedeaux Field; Los Angeles, California | 11–4 | **Michael Ebner (1–0)** | Matthew Grabmann (0–3) | – | 907 | 27–20–1 | 13–11 |
| 49 | May 9 | | Cal State Bakersfield* | Dedeaux Field; Los Angeles, California | 12–8 | **Fisher Johnson (4–3)** | Marcelo Saldana (0–4) | – | 212 | 28–20–1 | 13–11 |
| 50 | May 12 | | Arizona State | Dedeaux Field; Los Angeles, California | 4–1 | **Blake Sodersten (4–2)** | Timmy Manning (1–4) | **Kyle Wisch 5)** | 598 | 29–20–1 | 14–11 |
| 51 | May 13 | | Arizona State | Dedeaux Field; Los Angeles, California | 2–0 | **Caden Aoki (4–1)** | Owen Stevenson (4–3) | **Garrett Clarke (7)** | 811 | 30–20–1 | 15–11 |
| 51 | May 14 | | Arizona State | Dedeaux Field; Los Angeles, California | 5–1 | **Caden Connolly (2–1)** | Ross Dunn (4–5) | **Kyle Wisch (6)** | 624 | 31–20–1 | 16–11 |
| 52 | May 16 | | at Loyola Marymount* | George C. Page Stadium; Los Angeles, California | 8–6 | **Eric Hammond (3–4)** | Chaz McRoberts (1–3) | **Garrett Clarke (8)** | 317 | 32–20–1 | 16–11 |
| 53 | May 19 (Doubleheader) | | at Arizona | Hi Corbett Field; Tucson, Arizona | 4–13 | Cam Walty (5–0) | **Blake Sodersten (4–3)** | – | 3,643 | 32–31–1 | 16–12 |
| 54 | May 19 (Doubleheader) | | at Arizona | Hi Corbett Field; Tucson, Arizona | 3–6 | Bradon Zastrow (5–5) | **Caden Aoki (4–2)** | Trevor Long (5) | 3,643 | 32–22–1 | 16–13 |
| 55 | May 20 | | at Arizona | Hi Corbett Field; Tucson, Arizona | 14–6 | **Kyle Wisch (2–1)** | TJ Nichols (3–5) | – | 4,448 | 33–22–1 | 17–13 |

Postseason: 1–0 (Home: 0–0; Away: 0–0; Neutral: 1–1)

2023 Pac–12 Tournament: 1–1
| Game | Date | Opponent (Seed) | Rank (Seed) | Stadium | Score | Win | Loss | Save | Attendance | Overall |
|---|---|---|---|---|---|---|---|---|---|---|
| 56 | May 23 | #7 UCLA (Rivalry, Pool C Pool Play) | #4 | Scottsdale Stadium; Scottsdale, Arizona | 6–4 | **Caden Connolly (3–1)** | Jake Brooks (6–6) | **Kyle Wisch (7)** | 2,032 | 34–22–1 |
| 57 | May 25 | #3 Washington (Pool C Pool Play) | #4 | Scottsdale Stadium; Scottsdale, Arizona | 3–8 | Stu Flesland III (7–2) | **Caden Aoki (4–3)** | Case Matter (5) | – | 34–23–1 |
| 59 | May 26 | TBD | TBD | Scottsdale Stadium; Scottsdale, Arizona | | | | – | | |
| 60 | May 27 | TBD | TBD | Scottsdale Stadium; Scottsdale, Arizona | | | | – | | |

- Win
- Loss
- Tie
- Bold: Trojans team member
- Rankings from D1 Baseball.
- (#) Tournament seedings in parentheses.
- * indicates a non-conference game.

== Game summary ==
=== vs Marist ===
February 17 6:35 P.M. (PST) at Dedeaux Field, Los Angeles, California Clear, 58 °F (14 °C)
| Team | 1 | 2 | 3 | 4 | 5 | 6 | 7 | 8 | 9 | R | H | E |
|---|---|---|---|---|---|---|---|---|---|---|---|---|
| Marist Red Foxes | 0 | 0 | 0 | 0 | 0 | 6 | 0 | 0 | 0 | 6 | 7 | 2 |
| USC Trojans | 0 | 5 | 0 | 0 | 0 | 3 | 0 | 0 | x | 8 | 10 | 3 |
WP: Garrett Clarke (1–0) LP: Knitetek Zane (0–1) Sv: Kyle Wisch (1); Home runs: Away: None; Home: Nick Lopez, Bryce Martin-Grudzielanek (1); Attendance: 873; Boxscore

February 18 6:35 P.M. (PST) at Dedeaux Field, Los Angeles, California Partly Cloudy, 57 °F (14 °C)
| Team | 1 | 2 | 3 | 4 | 5 | 6 | 7 | 8 | 9 | R | H | E |
|---|---|---|---|---|---|---|---|---|---|---|---|---|
| Marist Red Foxes | 1 | 0 | 1 | 1 | 0 | 0 | 1 | 0 | 0 | 4 | 8 | 5 |
| USC Trojans | 1 | 0 | 0 | 5 | 4 | 1 | 6 | 0 | x | 17 | 11 | 3 |
WP: Jaden Agassi (1–0) LP: Yetter Brian (0–1) Sv: None; Home runs: Away: Brian Hart (1); Home: Nick Lopez (1); Attendance: 487; Boxscore

February 19 11:05 A.M. (PST) at Dedeaux Field, Los Angeles, California Clear, 62 °F (17 °C)
| Team | 1 | 2 | 3 | 4 | 5 | 6 | 7 | 8 | 9 | R | H | E |
|---|---|---|---|---|---|---|---|---|---|---|---|---|
| Marist Red Foxes | 0 | 0 | 1 | 1 | 0 | 0 | 0 | 0 | 0 | 2 | 5 | 3 |
| USC Trojans | 0 | 0 | 8 | 0 | 0 | 0 | 2 | 2 | x | 12 | 11 | 0 |
WP: Blake Sodersten (1–0) LP: John Hacker (0–1) Sv: None; Home runs: Away: Danny Moshier (1); Home: Johnny Olmstead (1), Nick Lopez (1), Cole Gabrielson (2); Attendance: 432; Boxscore

=== vs UC Irvine ===
February 21 6:35 P.M. (PST) at Dedeaux Field, Los Angeles, California Cloudy, 55 °F (13 °C)
| Team | 1 | 2 | 3 | 4 | 5 | 6 | 7 | 8 | 9 | R | H | E |
|---|---|---|---|---|---|---|---|---|---|---|---|---|
| UC Irvine Anteaters | 0 | 0 | 3 | 1 | 0 | 1 | 0 | 3 | 0 | 8 | 9 | 0 |
| USC Trojans | 1 | 0 | 0 | 0 | 4 | 1 | 0 | 0 | 1 | 7 | 10 | 0 |
WP: Finnegan Wall (1–0) LP: Toby Spach (0–1) Sv: Max Martin (1); Home runs: Away: Caden Kendle (1); Home: Carson Wells (1); Attendance: 433; Boxscore

=== at No. 17 Auburn ===
February 24 6:02 P.M. (PST) at Plainsman Park, Auburn, Alabama Cloudy, 71 °F (22 °C)
| Team | 1 | 2 | 3 | 4 | 5 | 6 | 7 | 8 | 9 | R | H | E |
|---|---|---|---|---|---|---|---|---|---|---|---|---|
| USC Trojans | 0 | 0 | 0 | 1 | 0 | 1 | 0 | 1 | 0 | 3 | 8 | 0 |
| 'No. 17 Auburn Tigers | 0 | 0 | 0 | 4 | 0 | 0 | 1 | 0 | x | 5 | 9 | 0 |
WP: John Armstrong (1–0) LP: Tyler Stromsborg (0–1) Sv: Will Cannon (1); Home runs: Away: None; Home: Justin Kirby (1); Attendance: 2,809; Boxscore

February 25 2:02 P.M. (PST) at Plainsman Park, Auburn, Alabama Partly Cloudy, 74 °F (23 °C)
| Team | 1 | 2 | 3 | 4 | 5 | 6 | 7 | 8 | 9 | R | H | E |
|---|---|---|---|---|---|---|---|---|---|---|---|---|
| USC Trojans | 1 | 0 | 2 | 0 | 0 | 0 | 0 | 3 | 0 | 6 | 9 | 2 |
| No. 17 Auburn Tigers | 0 | 0 | 0 | 3 | 0 | 5 | 0 | 4 | x | 12 | 14 | 2 |
WP: John Armstrong (2–0) LP: Fisher Johnson (0–1) Sv: Will Cannon (2); Home runs: Away: Johnny Olmstead (1); Home: Bryson Ware, Cooper McMurray (1); Attendance: 3,319; Boxscore

February 26 12:02 P.M. (PST) at Plainsman Park, Auburn, Alabama Game ending after 9 innings due to travel restrictions Mostly Cloudy, 74 °F (23 °C)
| Team | 1 | 2 | 3 | 4 | 5 | 6 | 7 | 8 | 9 | R | H | E |
|---|---|---|---|---|---|---|---|---|---|---|---|---|
| USC Trojans | 4 | 0 | 0 | 4 | 0 | 1 | 3 | 0 | 0 | 12 | 15 | 3 |
| No. 17 Auburn Tigers | 3 | 4 | 1 | 0 | 4 | 0 | 0 | 0 | 0 | 12 | 15 | 1 |
Home runs: Away: Johnny Olmstead, Cole Gabrielson (1); Home: Justin Kirby (2), Bryson Ware (1); Attendance: 2,813; Boxscore

=== vs UC Riverside ===
March 1 6:35 P.M. (PST) at Dedeaux Field, Los Angeles, California Cold, 48 °F (9 °C)
| Team | 1 | 2 | 3 | 4 | 5 | 6 | 7 | 8 | 9 | R | H | E |
|---|---|---|---|---|---|---|---|---|---|---|---|---|
| UC Riverside Highlanders | 1 | 2 | 0 | 0 | 3 | 0 | 0 | 0 | 0 | 6 | 10 | 1 |
| USC Trojans | 0 | 3 | 0 | 0 | 0 | 0 | 0 | 1 | 1 | 5 | 9 | 0 |
WP: Caleb Turner (1–0) LP: Blake Sodersten (1–1) Sv: Tyler Frazier (1); Home runs: Away: None; Home: Connor Clift (1); Attendance: 179; Boxscore

== 2023 Pac-12 Tournament ==
=== vs No. 7 UCLA Bruins ===
May 23 2:30 P.M. (PST) at Scottsdale Stadium, Scottsdale, Arizona Sunny, 99 °F (37 °C)
| Team | 1 | 2 | 3 | 4 | 5 | 6 | 7 | 8 | 9 | R | H | E |
|---|---|---|---|---|---|---|---|---|---|---|---|---|
| #7 UCLA Bruins | 0 | 0 | 1 | 3 | 0 | 0 | 0 | 0 | 0 | 4 | 6 | 2 |
| #4 USC Trojans | 0 | 0 | 1 | 0 | 3 | 2 | 0 | 0 | x | 6 | 10 | 1 |
WP: Caden Connolly (3–1) LP: Jake Brooks (6–6) Sv: Kyle Wisch (7); Home runs: Away: None; Home: Austin Overn (1); Attendance: 2,032; Boxscore

=== at No. 3 Washington Huskies ===
May 25 2:30 P.M. (PST) at Scottsdale Stadium, Scottsdale, Arizona Sunny, 95 °F (35 °C)
| Team | 1 | 2 | 3 | 4 | 5 | 6 | 7 | 8 | 9 | R | H | E |
|---|---|---|---|---|---|---|---|---|---|---|---|---|
| #4 USC Trojans | 0 | 0 | 0 | 0 | 0 | 2 | 0 | 1 | 0 | 3 | 7 | 1 |
| #3 Washington Huskies | 1 | 0 | 0 | 0 | 2 | 1 | 0 | 4 | x | 8 | 11 | 0 |
WP: Stu Flesland III (7–2) LP: Caden Aoki (4–3) Sv: Case Matter (5); Home runs: Away: None; Home: None

# Tournament seeding in parentheses

=== Pool C ===
| | Pool C | WASH | USC | UCLA |
| 3 | Washington | | 8–3 | 4–17 |
| 4 | USC | 3–8 | | 6–4 |
| 7 | UCLA | 17–4 | 4–6 | |

| Pos | Team | Pld | W | L | RF | RA | RD | PCT | Qualification |
|---|---|---|---|---|---|---|---|---|---|
| 1 | (3) Washington | 2 | 1 | 1 | 12 | 20 | −8 | .500 | Advanced to Semifinals |
| 2 | (4) USC | 2 | 1 | 1 | 9 | 12 | −3 | .500 | Eliminated |
| 3 | (7) UCLA | 2 | 1 | 1 | 21 | 10 | +11 | .500 | Eliminated |

| May 23; 2:30 p.m. Game 2 | (7) UCLA | 4–6 | (4) USC | Scottsdale Stadium; Attendance: 2,032; Umpires: Kellen Levy, Jake Uhlenhopp, Ramon Armendariz, Angel Campos |
| May 23; 2:30 p.m. Game 2 | LP: J. Brooks (6–6) | | WP: C. Connolly (3–1); Sv: K. Wisch (7) | Scottsdale Stadium; Attendance: 2,032; Umpires: Kellen Levy, Jake Uhlenhopp, Ramon Armendariz, Angel Campos |
| May 23; 2:30 p.m. Game 2 | HR: none | | HR: Overn (4) | Scottsdale Stadium; Attendance: 2,032; Umpires: Kellen Levy, Jake Uhlenhopp, Ramon Armendariz, Angel Campos |

| May 24; 2:30 p.m. Game 5 | (3) Washington | 4–17 (F/7 inn.) | (7) UCLA | Scottsdale Stadium; Attendance: 2,012; Umpires: Steve Mattingly, Travis Reininger, Patrick Riley, Joe Maiden |
| May 24; 2:30 p.m. Game 5 | LP: J. Engman (3–4) | | WP: K. Austin (5–4) | Scottsdale Stadium; Attendance: 2,012; Umpires: Steve Mattingly, Travis Reininger, Patrick Riley, Joe Maiden |
| May 24; 2:30 p.m. Game 5 | HR: Morales (11) | | HR: Holmen (13), Hahn (1) | Scottsdale Stadium; Attendance: 2,012; Umpires: Steve Mattingly, Travis Reininger, Patrick Riley, Joe Maiden |

| May 25; 2:30 p.m. Game 8 | (4) USC | 3–8 | (3) Washington | Scottsdale Stadium; Umpires: Mark Buchanan, Joe Burleson, Nathan White, Randy Sutton |
| May 25; 2:30 p.m. Game 8 | LP: Caden Aoki (4–3) | | WP: Stu Flesland III (7–2); Sv: Case Matter (5) | Scottsdale Stadium; Umpires: Mark Buchanan, Joe Burleson, Nathan White, Randy Sutton |
| May 25; 2:30 p.m. Game 8 | HR: None | | HR: None | Scottsdale Stadium; Umpires: Mark Buchanan, Joe Burleson, Nathan White, Randy Sutton |

== Rankings ==
Ranking movements Legend: ██ Increase in ranking ██ Decrease in ranking — = Not ranked RV = Received votes ( ) = First-place votes
| | Week | | | | | | | | | | | | | | | | |
| Poll | Pre | 1 | 2 | 3 | 4 | 5 | 6 | 7 | 8 | 9 | 10 | 11 | 12 | 13 | 14 | 15 | Final |
|---|---|---|---|---|---|---|---|---|---|---|---|---|---|---|---|---|---|
| Coaches' | RV (1) | RV (1)* | — | — | — | — | RV (1) | RV (5) | 24 | — | RV (11) | — | — | RV (3) | | | |
| Baseball America | — | — | — | — | — | — | RV | 25 | 21 | — | — | — | — | — | | | |
| Collegiate Baseball^ | — | — | — | — | — | RV | 24 | — | — | — | — | — | — | — | | | |
| NCBWA† | — | — | RV | — | — | — | — | RV | RV | RV | 26 | — (RV) | — | — | | | |
| D1Baseball | — | — | — | — | — | — | — | RV | 23 | DR | — | — | — | — | | | |

^ Collegiate Baseball ranked 40 teams in their preseason poll, but only ranked 30 teams weekly during the season.
† NCBWA ranks 30 teams in their preseason poll, but only ranks 25 teams weekly during the season.
* A new poll was not released for this week, so for comparison purposes, the previous week's ranking is inserted in this week's slot.
