= 2023 Washington Huskies baseball team =

American college baseball season

2023 Washington Huskies baseball

Stillwater Regional, 1–2
- Conference: Pac-12 Conference
- Record: 35–20 (17–12 Pac-12)
- Head coach: Jason Kelly (1st season)
- Assistant coaches: Jake Silverman (1st season); Billy Boyer (1st season)
- Home stadium: Husky Ballpark

2023 Pac-12 Conference baseball standings
	Conf.						Overall
Team	W		L		T	PCT	W		L		T	PCT
No. 4 Stanford ‍†‍‍^{y}	23	–	7	–	0	.767	38	–	16	–	0	.704
No. 23 Oregon State ‍‍‍^{y}	18	–	12	–	0	.600	39	–	18	–	0	.684
Washington ‍‍‍^{y}	17	–	12	–	0	.586	35	–	18	–	0	.660
USC ‍‍‍	17	–	13	–	0	.567	34	–	23	–	1	.595
Arizona State ‍‍‍	16	–	13	–	0	.552	32	–	23	–	0	.582
No. 12 Oregon ‍‍‡‍^{y}	16	–	14	–	0	.533	38	–	20	–	0	.655
UCLA ‍‍‍	12	–	16	–	1	.431	28	–	24	–	1	.538
Arizona ‍‍‍^{y}	12	–	18	–	0	.400	33	–	24	–	0	.579
California ‍‍‍	12	–	18	–	0	.400	24	–	28	–	0	.462
Washington State ‍‍‍	10	–	19	–	0	.345	29	–	23	–	0	.558
Utah ‍‍‍	9	–	20	–	1	.317	22	–	32	–	1	.409
† – Conference champion ‡ – Tournament champion y – Invited to the NCAA Division I Baseball Championship; As of May 30, 2023; Rankings from D1Baseball

The 2023 Washington Huskies baseball team were representing the University of Washington in Seattle, Washington in the 2023 NCAA Division I baseball season. The Huskies led by first year head coach Jason Kelly, played their home games at Husky Ballpark and were members of the Pac-12 Conference.

== Previous season ==
The Huskies finished the 2022 season with a record of 30–26 overall, 14–16 in Pac-12 conference play to finish in a tie for sixth. Due to a tiebreaker with California, they earn a seventh seed in the Pac-12 baseball tournament where they lost in the first round in the double elimination by 2nd seed Oregon State and in the elimination round they lost to 3rd seed UCLA.

== Roster ==
2023 Washington Huskies roster
Pitchers: 0 Isaac Yeager - Freshman; 4 Sawyer Parkin - Sophomore; 17 Colton McIntosh - (redshirt) Sophomore; 18 Stu Flesland III - (redshirt) Junior; 20 Jared Engman - Junior; 25 Reilly McAdams - (redshirt) Sophomore; 27 Gianluca Shinn - Junior; 28 Calvin Kirchoff - Junior; 31 Grant Cunningham - Freshman; 32 Josh Emanuels - (redshirt) Sophomore; 34 Kiefer Lord - Junior; 35 Peysen Sweeney - (redshirt) Freshman; 36 Case Matter - (redshirt) Sophomore; 37 Will Woodward - Freshman; 39 Kyle Bender - (redshirt) Freshman; 40 Sam Boyle - Freshman; 44 Boston Warkentin - Freshman	Catchers: 2 Johnny Tincher - (redshirt) Junior; 3 Jake Leitgeb - (redshirt) Sophomore; 23 Colin Blanchard - (redshirt) Freshman; Infielders: 6 Michael Snyder - (redshirt) Junior; 9 Dalton Chandler - (redshirt) Junior; 10 Will Simpson - (redshirt) Junior; 11 Christian Dicochea - (redshirt) Junior; 12 Cam Clayton - Sophomore; 16 Jeter Ybarra - Freshman; 21 Nick Hovland - (redshirt) Senior; 22 Jarred Mazzaferro - (redshirt) Junior; 26 Kyle Fossum - Junior; 30 Barron Zamora - Freshman; 34 Michael Brown - Junior; 41 Cooper Whitton - Freshman; 51 Sam DeCarlo - Freshman	Outfielders: 1 AJ Guerrero - Sophomore; 5 Cole Miller - (redshirt) Junior; 7 Luke Rohleder - Junior; 15 McKay Barney - (redshirt) Junior; 16 Jeter Ybarra - (redshirt) Sophomore; 24 Kyle Fossum - Sophomore; 36 Blake Burton - Sophomore

== Schedule and results ==
2023 Washington Huskies baseball game log
Regular season

February (5–2)
Date	Opponent	Rank	Site/stadium	Score	Win	Loss	Save	Attendance	Overall record	PAC-12 Record
Feb 18	at Santa Clara*		Mission College • Santa Clara, CA	10–5	**Boyle (1–0)**	Hales (0–1)	**Emanuels (1)**	300	1–0	
Feb 19	at Santa Clara*		Mission College • Santa Clara, CA	7–13	Hammond (1–0)	**McAdams (0–1)**		300	1–1	
Feb 19	at Santa Clara*		Mission College • Santa Clara, CA	2–4	Pilchard (1–0)	**Cunningham (0–1)**	**Souza (1)**	300	1–2	
Feb 20	at Santa Clara*		Mission College • Santa Clara, CA	10–7	**Matter (1–0)**	Souza (0–1)		300	2–2	
Feb 23	at San Jose State*		Excite Ballpark • San Jose, CA	7–6	**Emanuels (1–0)**	White (0–1)	**Matter (1)**	681	3–2	
Feb 25	at San Jose State*		Excite Ballpark • San Jose, CA	3–2	**Lord (1–0)**	Thompson (0–1)	**Emanuels (2)**	388	4–2	
Feb 26	at San Jose State*		Excite Ballpark • San Jose, CA	2–0	**Flesland III (1–0)**	Eden (0–1)	**Matter (2)**	367	5–2	

March (12–4)
Date	Opponent	Rank	Site/stadium	Score	Win	Loss	Save	Attendance	Overall record	PAC-12 Record
Mar 3	Northern Colorado*		Husky Ballpark • Seattle, WA	32–7	**Bender (1–0)**	Tuttle (0–1)		805	6–2	
Mar 4	Northern Colorado*		Husky Ballpark • Seattle, WA	6–0	**Lord (2–0)**	Ruiz (0–2)	**Cunningham (1)**	788	7–2	
Mar 4	Northern Colorado*		Husky Ballpark • Seattle, WA	9–1	**Flesland III (2–0)**	Smith (1–2)	**Boyle (1)**	788	8–2	
Mar 5	Northern Colorado*		Husky Ballpark • Seattle, WA	10–4	**Kirchoff (1–0)**	Cruz (0–2)		N/A	9–2	
Mar 7	at Portland*		Joe Etzel Field • Portland, OR	6–2	**Boyle (2–0)**	Hebert (0–1)		307	10–2	
Mar 10	Utah		Husky Ballpark • Seattle, WA	5–2	**Lord (3–0)**	Day (2–2)	**Matter (3)**	721	11–2	1–0
Mar 11	Utah		Husky Ballpark • Seattle, WA	4–3	**Matter (2–0)**	Whiting (0–1)		1,001	12–2	2–0
Mar 12	Utah		Husky Ballpark • Seattle, WA	0–3	Jones (1–1)	**Engman (1–1)**	Ashman (4)	769	12–3	2–1
Mar 17	Rhode Island*		Husky Ballpark • Seattle, WA	6–9	Urena (1–0)	**Emanuels (1–1)**		681	12–4	
Mar 18	Rhode Island*		Husky Ballpark • Seattle, WA	12–6	**Flesland III (3–0)**	Levesque (2–2)		1,623	13–4	
Mar 19	Rhode Island*		Husky Ballpark • Seattle, WA	15–5	**Engman (1–1)**	Perry (1–2)		794	14–4	
Mar 22	Tulane*		Husky Ballpark • Seattle, WA	9–14	Wachter (1–2)	**Cunningham (0–2)**		889	14–5	
Mar 24	at No. 7 UCLA		Jackie Robinson Stadium • Los Angeles, CA	1–5	Brooks (4–2)	**Lord (3–1)**		811	14–6	2–2
Mar 25	at No. 7 UCLA		Jackie Robinson Stadium • Los Angeles, CA	3–0 (10)	**Emanuels (2–1)**	Jewett (0–1)		860	15–6	3–2
Mar 26	at No. 7 UCLA		Jackie Robinson Stadium • Los Angeles, CA	11–10	**Boyle (1–1)**	Aldrich (3–1)	**Matter (4)**	1,010	16–6	4–2
Mar 28	Portland*		Husky Ballpark • Seattle, WA	8–3	**McAdams (1–1)**	Johnson (0–1)	**Cunningham (2)**	307	17–6	
Mar 31	Oregon State		Husky Ballpark • Seattle, WA	**POSTPONED**						

April (8–7)
Date	Opponent	Rank	Site/stadium	Score	Win	Loss	Save	Attendance	Overall record	PAC-12 Record
Apr 1	Oregon State		Husky Ballpark • Seattle, WA	3–6	Sellers (4–2)	**Lord (3–2)**	Brown (5)	1,845	17–7	4–3
Apr 1	Oregon State		Husky Ballpark • Seattle, WA	1–5	Kmatz (2–4)	**Flesland III (3–1)**		1,845	17–8	4–4
Apr 2	Oregon State		Husky Ballpark • Seattle, WA	7–2	**Engman (2–1)**	Krieg (0–1)	**Emanuels (3)**	1,730	18–8	5–4
Apr 6	at Arizona		Hi Corbett Field • Tucson, AZ	13–8	**Shinn (1–0)**	Long (2–3)		2,693	19–8	6–4
Apr 7	at Arizona		Hi Corbett Field • Tucson, AZ	4–12	Zastrow (3–1)	**Lord (3–3)**	Nichols (1)	3,902	19–9	6–5
Apr 8	at Arizona		Hi Corbett Field • Tucson, AZ	1–13	May (3–2)	**Engman (2–2)**		2,881	19–10	6–6
Apr 14	No. 22 Arizona State		Husky Ballpark • Seattle, WA	8–3	**Flesland III** (4–1)	Dunn (4–2)		1,459	20–10	7–6
Apr 15	No. 22 Arizona State		Husky Ballpark • Seattle, WA	6–8	Curtis (4–2)	**Engman (2–3)**		1,493	20–11	7–7
Apr 16	No. 22 Arizona State		Husky Ballpark • Seattle, WA	**CANCELED**						
Apr 21	at No. 9 Stanford		Klein Field at Sunken Diamond • Stanford, CA	1–3	Pancer (1–0)	**McAdams (1–2)**		1,832	20–12	7–8
Apr 22	at No. 9 Stanford		Klein Field at Sunken Diamond • Stanford, CA	9–0	**Lord (4–3)**	Scott (5–2)		1,643	21–12	8–8
Apr 23	at No. 9 Stanford		Klein Field at Sunken Diamond • Stanford, CA	6–8	Dowd (5–2)	**Emanuels (2–2)**	Pancer (4)	1,960	21–13	8–9
Apr 25	Seattle*		Husky Ballpark • Seattle, WA	6–4	**McAdams (2–2)**	Dayton (2–2)		1,046	22–13	
Apr 28	USC		Husky Ballpark • Seattle, WA	14–12 (10)	**Emanuels** (3–2)	Clarke (2–3)		1,418	23–13	9–9
Apr 29	USC		Husky Ballpark • Seattle, WA	7–6	**Cunningham** (1–2)	Wisch (0–1)	**Emanuels (4)**	1,687	24–13	10–9
Apr 30	USC		Husky Ballpark • Seattle, WA	4–1	**Engman** (3–3)	Sodersten (2–2)	**Emanuels (5)**	1,753	25–13	11–9

May (8–3)
Date	Opponent	Rank	Site/stadium	Score	Win	Loss	Save	Attendance	Overall record	PAC-12 Record
May 2	at Seattle*		Bannerwood Park • Bellevue, WA	9–4	**Kirchoff (2–0)**	Hogan (0–7)		312	26–13	
May 5	at Washington State		Bailey–Brayton Field • Pullman, WA	1–2	Hawkins (4–3)	**Flesland III (4–2)**	Kaelber (3)	1,441	26–14	11–10
May 6	at Washington State		Bailey–Brayton Field • Pullman, WA	6–2	**Lord (5–3)**	Taylor (3–3)		1,250	27–14	12–10
May 7	at Washington State		Bailey–Brayton Field • Pullman, WA	8–2	**Boyle (4–0)**	Kaelber (4–3)		1,463	28–14	13–10
May 9	Seattle*		Husky Ballpark • Seattle, WA	9–2	**Matter (3–0)**	Alwood (2–2)		1,114	29–14	
May 12	at No. 24 Oregon		PK Park • Eugene, OR	14–5	**Flesland III (5–2)**	Mercado (4–1)		2,435	30–14	14–10
May 13	at No. 24 Oregon		PK Park • Eugene, OR	18–8	**Lord (6–3)**	Pace (2–3)	**Cunningham (3)**	2,660	31–14	15–10
May 14	at No. 24 Oregon		PK Park • Eugene, OR	11–5	**Matter (4–0)**	Dallas (6–2)	**Emanuels (6)**	3,060	32–14	16–10
May 18	California	No. 24	Husky Ballpark • Seattle, WA	12–1	**Flesland III (6–2)**	Becerra (2–5)	**Cunningham (4)**	1,583	33–14	17–10
May 19	California	No. 24	Husky Ballpark • Seattle, WA	7–12	Stamos (3–3)	**Lord (6–4)**	Stasiowski (3)	2,435	33–15	17–11
May 20	California	No. 24	Husky Ballpark • Seattle, WA	11–16	Pasqualott (5–1)	**Matter (4–1)**		1,634	33–16	17–12

Postseason

2023 Pac–12 tournament (1–2)
Date	Opponent (Seed)	Rank (Seed)	Stadium	Score	Win	Loss	Save	Attendance	Overall	Pac-12 Tournament
May 24	vs. (7) UCLA	(3)	Scottsdale Stadium • Scottsdale, AZ	4–17 (7)	Austin (5–4)	**Engman (3–4)**		2,012	33–17	0–1
May 25	vs. (4) USC	(3)	Scottsdale Stadium • Scottsdale, AZ	8–3	**Flesland III (7–2)**	Aoki (4–3)	**Matter (5)**	2,384	34–17	1–1
May 26	vs. (6) Oregon	(3)	Scottsdale Stadium • Scottsdale, AZ	4–17 (7)	Grinsell (2–1)	**Lord (6–5)**		2,563	34–18	1–2

NCAA Stillwater Regional (1–2)
Date	Opponent (Seed)	Rank (Seed)	Stadium	Score	Win	Loss	Save	Attendance	Overall	Regional record
Jun 2	vs. (2) No. 11 Dallas Baptist*	(3)	O'Brate Stadium • Stillwater, OK	9–5	**Boyle (5–0)**	Johnson (8–4)		4,475	35–18	1–0
Jun 3	vs. (4) Oral Roberts*	(3)	O'Brate Stadium • Stillwater, OK	12–15	Kowalski (2–1)	**Cunningham (1–3)**	Denton (14)	4,716	35–19	1–1
Jun 4	vs. (2) No. 11 Dallas Baptist*	(3)	O'Brate Stadium • Stillwater, OK	1–9	Bragg (9–2)	**Engman (3–5)**		4,488	35–20	1–2

- Win
- Loss
- Postponement/Tie
- Bold: Washington team member
- Rankings from D1 Baseball
- (#) Tournament seedings in parentheses.
- * indicates a non-conference game.

== Rankings ==
Ranking movements Legend: ██ Increase in ranking ██ Decrease in ranking — = Not ranked RV = Received votes
	Week																			
Poll	Pre	1	2	3	4	5	6	7	8	9	10	11	12	13	14	15	16	17	18	Final
Coaches'	—	—*	—	—	—	—	—	—	—	—	—	—	—	—	RV					
Baseball America	—	—	—	—	—	—	—	—	—	—	—	—	—	24	RV					
Collegiate Baseball^	—	—	—	—	—	—	—	30	—	—	—	—	—	—	RV					
NCBWA†	—	—	—	—	—	—	—	—	—	—	—	—	—	25	RV					
D1Baseball	—	—	—	—	—	—	—	—	—	—	—	—	—	24	RV					

^ Collegiate Baseball ranked 40 teams in their preseason poll, but only ranked 30 teams weekly during the season.
† NCBWA ranks 30 teams in their preseason poll, but only ranks 25 teams weekly during the season.
* A new poll was not released for this week, so for comparison purposes, the previous week's ranking is inserted in this week's slot.
