= 2023 Arizona State Sun Devils baseball team =

American baseball team

2023 Arizona State Sun Devils baseball
- Conference: Pac-12 Conference
- Record: 32–23 (16–13 Pac-12)
- Head coach: Willie Bloomquist (2nd season)
- Assistant coaches: Mike Goff (2nd season); Travis Buck (2nd season); Dan Jaffe (1st season)
- Pitching coach: Sam Peraza (2nd season)
- Home stadium: Phoenix Municipal Stadium

2023 Pac-12 Conference baseball standings
	Conf.						Overall
Team	W		L		T	PCT	W		L		T	PCT
No. 4 Stanford ‍†‍‍^{y}	23	–	7	–	0	.767	38	–	16	–	0	.704
No. 23 Oregon State ‍‍‍^{y}	18	–	12	–	0	.600	39	–	18	–	0	.684
Washington ‍‍‍^{y}	17	–	12	–	0	.586	35	–	18	–	0	.660
USC ‍‍‍	17	–	13	–	0	.567	34	–	23	–	1	.595
Arizona State ‍‍‍	16	–	13	–	0	.552	32	–	23	–	0	.582
No. 12 Oregon ‍‍‡‍^{y}	16	–	14	–	0	.533	38	–	20	–	0	.655
UCLA ‍‍‍	12	–	16	–	1	.431	28	–	24	–	1	.538
Arizona ‍‍‍^{y}	12	–	18	–	0	.400	33	–	24	–	0	.579
California ‍‍‍	12	–	18	–	0	.400	24	–	28	–	0	.462
Washington State ‍‍‍	10	–	19	–	0	.345	29	–	23	–	0	.558
Utah ‍‍‍	9	–	20	–	1	.317	22	–	32	–	1	.409
† – Conference champion ‡ – Tournament champion y – Invited to the NCAA Division I Baseball Championship; As of May 30, 2023; Rankings from D1Baseball

The 2023 Arizona State Sun Devils baseball team represented Arizona State University in the 2023 NCAA Division I baseball season. The Sun Devils played their home games at Phoenix Municipal Stadium under second year coach Willie Bloomquist.

== Previous season ==
The Sun Devils finished their season with a record of 26–32, and 13–17 in conference play finishing 8th in the 2022 Pac-12 Conference baseball standings.

=== 2022 MLB draft ===
The Sun Devils had six players drafted in the 2022 MLB draft.

Player	Position	Round	Overall	MLB team
Joe Lampe	Outfield	3	92	Cleveland Guardians
Sean McLain	Shortstop	5	165	Los Angeles Dodgers
Nate Baez	Catcher	12	254	Minnesota Twins
Kyle Luckham	Pitcher	15	441	Washington Nationals
Adam Tulloch	Pitcher	15	451	Cleveland Guardians
Ethan Long	1st Base	20	616	San Francisco Giants

- Ethan Long did not sign with the San Francisco Giants and returned to Arizona State.

== Incoming Recruits ==
2023 Arizona State Recruits
Name	B/T	Pos.	Height	Weight	Hometown	High School
Isaiah Jackson	L/R	OF	6’3”	205 lbs	Vail, AZ	Cienega High School
Jose Vargas	L/R	OF	6’3”	188 lbs	League City, TX	Clear Springs High School
Luke Hill	R/R	SS	6’1”	190	Port Allen, LA	Episcopal School of Baton Rouge
Dominic Chacon	L/L	OF	6’3”	195	Scottsdale, AZ	Horizon High School
Brandon Compton	L/L	LHP	6’1”	205	Buckeye, AZ	Buckeye Union High School
Nu'U Contrades	R/R	SS	5’11”	185	Ewa Beach, HI	Saint Louis School
Ryan Hanks	R/R	RHP	6’2”	215	Spring, TX	Klein Cain High School
Stephen Hernandez	L/L	LHP	6’2”	190	Gilbert, AZ	Perry High School
Austin Humphres	L/L	LHP	6’4”	202	Surprise, AZ	Shadow Ridge High School
Brandon Koble	L/L	LHP	6’3”	194	Gilbert, AZ	Red Mountain High School
Logan Saloman	R/R	RHP	6’5”	210	Chandler, AZ	Hamilton High School
Kien Vu	L/L	OF	5’11”	170	San Diego, CA	Point Loma High School
Reese Beheler	L/R	1B	6’1”	210	Sugar Land, TX	George Ranch High School

== Personnel ==
=== Roster ===
2023 Arizona State Sun Devils roster
Pitchers: 5 – Khristian Curtis – Junior; 9 – Blake Pivaroff – Junior; 10 – Christian Bodlovich – (redshirt) Junior; 12 – Timmy Manning – Junior; 13 – Tyler Meyer – (redshirt) Sophomore; 19 – Dylan Gardner – Junior; 23 – Stephen Hernandez – Freshman; 27 – Brandon Compton – Freshman; 28 – Austin Humphres – Freshman; 29 – Owen Stevenson – Junior; 31 – Josh Hansell – Junior; 33 – Brock Peery – Junior; 37 – Nolan Lebamoff – Grad. Student; 38 – Tyler Valdez – Junior; 39 – Jesse Wainscott – (redshirt) Senior; 40 – Jonah Giblin – Junior; 45 – Ryan Hanks – Freshman; 46 – Ross Dunn – Junior; 47 – Matt Tieding – (redshirt) Junior; 48 – Will Armbruester – Senior	Catchers: 15 – Trey Newman – (redshirt) Junior; 17 – Ryan Campos – Sophomore; 21 – Will Rogers – Sophomore; 41 – Bronson Balholm – (redshirt) Senior; Infielders: 2 – Drake Varnado – Sophomore; 6 – Nu’u Contrades – Freshman; 7 – Luke Hill – Freshman; 8 – Jonny Weaver – Grad. Student; 14 – Wyatt Crenshaw – Senior; 18 – Jacob Tobias – Sophomore; 25 – Ethan Long – Junior; 26 – Willie Cano – Senior; 32 – Luke Keaschall – Junior; 32 – Reese Beheler – Freshman	Outfielders: 3 – Nick McLain – Sophomore; 11 – Kien Vu – Freshman; 22 – Jose Vargas – Freshman; 24 – Isaiah Jackson – Freshman

=== Coaching staff ===
2023 Arizona State coaching staff
Name	Position	Seasons at Arizona State	Alma mater
Willie Bloomquist	Head coach	2	Arizona State
Mike Goff	Assistant Coach	2	UAB
Travis Buck	Assistant Coach	2	Arizona State
Dan Jaffe	Assistant Coach	1	Southern Nevada
Sam Peraza	Pitching Coach/Recruiting Coordinator	1	San Diego State

== Pac–12 media poll ==
Pac–12 media poll
Predicted finish	Team	Votes (1st place)
1	Stanford	99 (9)
2	UCLA	90 (2)
3	Oregon State	77
4	Arizona	74
5	Oregon	68
6	Arizona State	45
7	Washington	43
8	California	40
9	Washington State	29
10	USC	24
11	Utah	16

== Preseason Honors ==
=== All-Pac-12 Team ===
Preseason All-Pac-12 Baseball Team
Player	Position	Class
Ryan Campos	Catcher	Sophomore
Ethan Long	Infielder	Junior
Jacob Tobias	infielder	Sophomore

== Schedule and results ==
2023 Arizona State Sun Devils baseball game log
Regular Season
Date	Opponent	Rank	Site/stadium	Score	Win	Loss	Save	Overall Record	Pac-12 Record
Feb 17	San Diego State		Phoenix Municipal Stadium • Phoenix, AZ	W 6–5	Peery (1–0)	Saufer (0–1)	–	1–0	—
Feb 18	San Diego State		Phoenix Municipal Stadium • Phoenix, AZ	W 5–3	Curtis (1–0)	Canada (0–1)	Peery (1)	2–0	—
Feb 19	San Diego State		Phoenix Municipal Stadium • Phoenix, AZ	W 1–0	Wainscott (1–0)	Serrano (0–1)	–	3–0	—
Feb 21	UNLV		Phoenix Municipal Stadium • Phoenix, AZ	W 6–3	Tieding (1–0)	Mattera (0–1)	Peery (2)	4–0	—
Feb 24	at Mississippi State		Dudy Noble Field • Starkville, MS	W 13–4	Dunn (1–0)	Smith (1–1)	–	5–0	—
Feb 25	at Mississippi State		Dudy Noble Field • Starkville, MS	L 1–5	Yntema (1–0)	Curtis (1–1)	Dohm (1)	5–1	—
Feb 26	at Mississippi State		Dudy Noble Field • Starkville, MS	L 3–16	Gartman (1–0)	Manning (0–1)	–	5–2	—
Mar 1	North Dakota State		Phoenix Municipal Stadium • Phoenix, AZ	W 10–9	Lebamoff (1–0)	Riedinger (0–1)	–	6–2	—
Mar 3	UC Irvine		Phoenix Municipal Stadium • Phoenix, AZ	L 6–16	Wheeler (1–0)	Dunn (1–1)	–	6–3	—
Mar 4	UC Irvine		Phoenix Municipal Stadium • Phoenix, AZ	L 9–10	Antone (2–0)	Curtis (1–2)	Martin (2)	6–4	—
Mar 5	UC Irvine		Phoenix Municipal Stadium • Phoenix, AZ	L 2–7	Pinto (1–0)	Manning (0–2)	–	6–5	—
Mar 7	at No. 13 Oklahoma State		O'Brate Stadium • Stillwater, OK	L 4–8	Stebens (2–0)	Pivaroff (0–1)	–	6–6	—
Mar 8	at No. 13 Oklahoma State		O'Brate Stadium • Stillwater, OK	L 4–7	Abram (1–0)	Stevenson (0–1)	–	6–7	—
Mar 10	UC Davis		Phoenix Municipal Stadium • Phoenix, AZ	W 7–1	Dunn (2–1)	Freeman (0–4)	–	7–7	—
Mar 11	UC Davis		Phoenix Municipal Stadium • Phoenix, AZ	W 6–4	Curtis (2–2)	Green (3–1)	Wainscott (1)	8–7	—
Mar 12	UC Davis		Phoenix Municipal Stadium • Phoenix, AZ	W 17–4	Giblin (1–0)	Barnes (1–1)	–	9–7	—
Mar 14	Utah Tech		Phoenix Municipal Stadium • Phoenix, AZ	W 9–1	Stevenson (1–1)	Woodbury (0–1)	–	10–7	—
Mar 17	vs. Utah		Larry H. Miller Field • Provo, UT	W 9–7	Dunn (3–1)	Day (2–3)	Wainscott (2)	11–7	1–0
Mar 18	at Utah		Smith's Ballpark • Salt Lake City, UT	W 15–9	Tieding (2–0)	Harris (0–2)	–	12–7	2–0
Mar 19	at Utah		Smith's Ballpark • Salt Lake City, UT	L 6–11	Van Sickle (2–1)	Wainscott (1–1)	–	12–8	2–1
Mar 22	No. 25 Grand Canyon		Phoenix Municipal Stadium • Phoenix, AZ	W 11–1	Hansell (1–0)	Lyon (0–1)	–	13–8	–
Mar 24	Arizona		Phoenix Municipal Stadium • Phoenix, AZ	W 6–5	Tieding (3–0)	Nichols (3–2)	Pivaroff (1)	14–8	3–1
Mar 25	Arizona		Phoenix Municipal Stadium • Phoenix, AZ	W 7–4	Lebamoff (2–0)	Hintz (0–2)	Stevenson (1)	15–8	4–1
Mar 26	Arizona		Phoenix Municipal Stadium • Phoenix, AZ	W 10–6	Manning (1–2)	May (2–1)	–	16–8	5–1
Mar 28	vs. UNLV		Las Vegas Ballpark • Las Vegas, NV	W 6–2	Lebamoff (3–0)	Carabajal (0–3)	–	17–8	–
Mar 31	at California		Evans Diamond • Berkeley, CA	W 6–2	Dunn (4–1)	Becerra (0–1)	Stevenson (2)	18–8	6–1
Apr 1	at California		Evans Diamond • Berkeley, CA	L 4–5	Bougie (3–1)	Tieding (3–1)	–	18–9	6–2
Apr 2	at California		Evans Diamond • Berkeley, CA	W 15–10	Pivaroff (1–1)	Bougie (3–2)	–	19–9	7–2
Apr 4	Seattle		Phoenix Municipal Stadium • Phoenix, AZ	W 11–6	Hansell (2–0)	Hogan (0–4)	–	20–9	–
Apr 6	Washington State		Phoenix Municipal Stadium • Phoenix, AZ	W 6–5	Peery (2–0)	Grillo (0–1)	–	21–9	8–2
Apr 7	Washington State		Phoenix Municipal Stadium • Phoenix, AZ	W 6–2	Pivaroff (2–1)	Kaelber (3–2)	Stevenson (3)	22–9	9–2
Apr 8	Washington State		Phoenix Municipal Stadium • Phoenix, AZ	W 4–1	Curtis (3–2)	Taylor (2–2)	Stevenson (4)	23–9	10–2
Apr 11	at Grand Canyon	No. 24	Brazell Field at GCU Ballpark • Phoenix, AZ	W 13–10	Peery (3–0)	Cooper-Vassalakis (1–3)	–	24–9	–
Apr 14	Washington	No. 22	Husky Ballpark • Seattle, WA	L 3–8	Flesland III (4–1)	Dunn (4–2)	–	24–10	10–3
Apr 15	Washington	No. 22	Husky Ballpark • Seattle, WA	W 8–6	Curtis (4–2)	Engman (2–3)	–	25–10	11–3
Apr 16	Washington	No. 22	Husky Ballpark • Seattle, WA	Cancelled	–	–	–	–	–
Apr 19	Arizona	No. 19	Hi Corbett Field • Tucson, AZ	L 0–20	Walty (2–0)	Manning (1–3)	–	25–11	–
Apr 21	No. 21 Oregon State	No. 19	Phoenix Municipal Stadium • Phoenix, AZ	L 11–13	Sellers (6–3)	Dunn (4–3)	Brown (8)	25–12	11–4
Apr 22	No. 21 Oregon State	No. 19	Phoenix Municipal Stadium • Phoenix, AZ	W 11–13	Stevenson (2–1)	Brown (3–1)	–	26–12	12–4
Apr 23	No. 21 Oregon State	No. 19	Phoenix Municipal Stadium • Phoenix, AZ	W 12–10	Stevenson (3–1)	Jimenez (1–1)	Pivaroff (2)	27–12	13–4
Apr 25	Cal State Fullerton	No. 17	Phoenix Municipal Stadium • Phoenix, AZ	W 12–10	Tieding (4–1)	Blood (1–2)	–	28–12	–
Apr 25	Cal State Fullerton	No. 17	Phoenix Municipal Stadium • Phoenix, AZ	L 8–11	Ingrassia (4–1)	Valdez (0–1)	Faulks (1)	28–13	–
Apr 28	at No. 20 Oregon	No. 12	PK Park • Eugene, OR	L 5–11	Stoffal (6–2)	Giblin (1–1)	–	28–14	13–5
Apr 29	at No. 20 Oregon	No. 12	PK Park • Eugene, OR	L 10–16	Mercado (4–0)	Curtis (4–3)	Dallas (2)	28–15	13–6
Apr 30	at No. 20 Oregon	No. 12	PK Park • Eugene, OR	W 9–6	Stevenson (4–1)	Mollerus (1–2)	Pivaroff (3)	29–15	14–6
May 5	No. 7 Stanford	No. 20	Phoenix Municipal Stadium • Phoenix, AZ	L 6–8	Mathews (6–3)	Pivaroff (2–2)	Bruno (5)	29–16	14–7
May 6	No. 7 Stanford	No. 20	Phoenix Municipal Stadium • Phoenix, AZ	L 11–12	Dowd (6–2)	Stevenson (4–2)	Bruno (6)	29–17	14–8
May 7	No. 7 Stanford	No. 20	Phoenix Municipal Stadium • Phoenix, AZ	L 4–9	Dixon (4–0)	Dunn (4–4)	Pancer (5)	29–18	14–9
May 12	at USC		Dedeaux Field • Los Angeles, CA	L 1–4	Sodersten (4–2)	Manning (1–4)	Wisch (5)	29–19	14–10
May 13	at USC		Dedeaux Field • Los Angeles, CA	L 0–2	Aoki (4–1)	Stevenson (4–3)	Clarke (7)	29–20	14–11
May 14	at USC		Dedeaux Field • Los Angeles, CA	L 1–5	Connolly (2–1)	Dunn (4–5)	Wisch (6)	29–21	14–12
May 18	UCLA		Phoenix Municipal Stadium • Phoenix, AZ	W 5–4	Stevenson (5–3)	Delvecchio (1–4)	–	30–21	15–12
May 19	UCLA		Phoenix Municipal Stadium • Phoenix, AZ	L 3–6	Flanagan (2–1)	Dunn (4–6)	Delvecchio (3)	30–22	15–13
May 20	UCLA		Phoenix Municipal Stadium • Phoenix, AZ	W 2–1	Stevenson (6–3)	Grothues (0–1)	–	31–22	16–13
Pac-12 Conference Tournament
May 23	vs. Arizona (8)	(5)	Scottsdale Stadium • Scottsdale, AZ	L 3–12	May (5–2)	Hansell (2–1)	–	31–23	–
May 25	vs. Oregon State (2)	(5)	Scottsdale Stadium • Scottsdale, AZ	W 14–10	Pivaroff (3–2)	Larson (3–2)	–	32–23	–

== Awards and honors ==
Conference honors
Honors	Player	Position	Ref.
Pac-12 All Conference Team	Ryan Bruno	P	
Pac-12 All Conference Team	Ryan Campos	C	
Pac-12 All Conference Team	Luke Keaschall	OF	
Pac-12 All-Defensive Team	Isaiah Jackson	OF	

Weekly honors
Honors	Player	Position	Date Awarded	Ref.
Pac-12 Baseball Player of the Week	Luke Keaschall	INF	March 20, 2023	
Pac-12 Baseball Player of the Week	Nu'U Contrades	INF	March 27, 2023	
Pac-12 Baseball Player of the Week	Ryan Campos	C	April 10, 2023	

== Rankings ==
Ranking movements Legend: ██ Increase in ranking ██ Decrease in ranking — = Not ranked RV = Received votes
	Week																			
Poll	Pre	1	2	3	4	5	6	7	8	9	10	11	12	13	14	15	16	17	18	Final
Coaches'	—	—*	RV	—	—	—	RV	RV	23	21	18	22	RV	—	—	—	—	—	—	
Baseball America	—	—	—	—	—	—	—	—	22	18	12	18	—	—	—	—	—	—	—	
Collegiate Baseball^	RV	—	—	—	—	—	20	16	10	8	4	11	—	—	—	—	—	—	—	
NCBWA†	RV	RV	RV	RV	RV	RV	RV	RV	23	19	16	21	27	RV	RV	—	—	—	—	
D1Baseball	—	—	—	—	—	—	—	—	24	19	17	20	—	—	—	—	—	—	—	

^ Collegiate Baseball ranked 40 teams in their preseason poll, but only ranked 30 teams weekly during the season.
† NCBWA ranks 30 teams in their preseason poll, but only ranks 25 teams weekly during the season.
* A new poll was not released for this week, so for comparison purposes, the previous week's ranking is inserted in this week's slot.
