= 2023 Oregon State Beavers baseball team =

College baseball team in the 2023 NCAA Division I season

2023 Oregon State Beavers baseball

Baton Rouge Regional, 2–2
- Conference: Pac-12 Conference

Ranking
- Coaches: No. 17
- CB: No. 23
- Record: 41–20 (18–12 Pac-12)
- Head coach: Mitch Canham (4th season)
- Assistant coaches: Darwin Barney (3rd season); Ryan Gipson (5th season)
- Pitching coach: Rich Dorman (4th season)
- Home stadium: Goss Stadium at Coleman Field

2023 Pac-12 Conference baseball standings
	Conf.						Overall
Team	W		L		T	PCT	W		L		T	PCT
No. 4 Stanford ‍†‍‍^{y}	23	–	7	–	0	.767	38	–	16	–	0	.704
No. 23 Oregon State ‍‍‍^{y}	18	–	12	–	0	.600	39	–	18	–	0	.684
Washington ‍‍‍^{y}	17	–	12	–	0	.586	35	–	18	–	0	.660
USC ‍‍‍	17	–	13	–	0	.567	34	–	23	–	1	.595
Arizona State ‍‍‍	16	–	13	–	0	.552	32	–	23	–	0	.582
No. 12 Oregon ‍‍‡‍^{y}	16	–	14	–	0	.533	38	–	20	–	0	.655
UCLA ‍‍‍	12	–	16	–	1	.431	28	–	24	–	1	.538
Arizona ‍‍‍^{y}	12	–	18	–	0	.400	33	–	24	–	0	.579
California ‍‍‍	12	–	18	–	0	.400	24	–	28	–	0	.462
Washington State ‍‍‍	10	–	19	–	0	.345	29	–	23	–	0	.558
Utah ‍‍‍	9	–	20	–	1	.317	22	–	32	–	1	.409
† – Conference champion ‡ – Tournament champion y – Invited to the NCAA Division I Baseball Championship; As of May 30, 2023; Rankings from D1Baseball

The 2023 Oregon State Beavers baseball team represented Oregon State University in the 2023 NCAA Division I baseball season. The Beavers played their home games at Goss Stadium at Coleman Field as members of the Pac-12 Conference. The team was led by Pat Casey Head Baseball Coach Mitch Canham in his fourth season at Oregon State.

== Preseason ==
The Beavers were ranked in the preseason Top-25 by only three of the six major poll organizations and were picked to finish third in the Pac-12 preseason coaches poll despite ending the prior season ranked 10th in the final D1 poll. The team lost 18 players from the 2022 squad, including Major League Baseball 1st round pick and National Pitcher of the Year Award winner Cooper Hjerpe, but signed one of the top recruiting classes in the nation.

== Regular season ==
Following a three-game sweep of Coppin State, Trent Sellers was named the Pac-12's Pitcher of the Week and Gavin Turley was selected as conference Player of the Week.

Mitch Canham reached his 100th win as head coach on March 7 in a win over San Diego, becoming the fifth Beaver head coach to reach that milestone.

Travis Bazzana set the all-time Oregon State record for most steals in a game with five against the Seattle Redhawks. The previous record of four steals in a single game was set by Steve Lyons in 1979 and matched by David Anderson in 1991. Bazzana later broke the single-season steal record when he recorded his 30th steal in a game against Utah.

== Roster ==
2023 Oregon State Beavers baseball team
Players
Coaches

#	Pos.	Name	B/T	Height	Weight	Year	Home town
1	OF	Gavin Turley	R/R	6 ft 1 in (1.85 m)	190 lb (86 kg)	Fr	Chandler, AZ
2	INF	Dallas Macias	S/R	5 ft 11 in (1.8 m)	192 lb (87 kg)	Fr	Parker, CO
6	OF	Ruben Cedillo	R/R	5 ft 10 in (1.78 m)	191 lb (87 kg)	So	Independence, OR
7	INF	Mikey Kane	R/R	6 ft 3 in (1.91 m)	195 lb (88 kg)	So	La Canada, CA
8	C	Tanner Smith	R/R	6 ft 0 in (1.83 m)	215 lb (98 kg)	So	Chandler, AZ
9	INF	Mason Guerra	R/R	6 ft 3 in (1.91 m)	203 lb (92 kg)	So	Beaverton, OR
12	OF	Micah McDowell	L/R	6 ft 1 in (1.85 m)	190 lb (86 kg)	Jr	Halifax, Nova Scotia
13	C	TJ Wheeler	L/R	5 ft 10 in (1.78 m)	200 lb (91 kg)	Sr	Modesto, CA
15	INF	Kyle Dernedde	R/R	5 ft 9 in (1.75 m)	185 lb (84 kg)	Jr	Tualatin, OR
17	OF	Brady Kasper	L/R	6 ft 1 in (1.85 m)	201 lb (91 kg)	Jr	Mission Viejo, CA
18	C	Wilson Weber	R/R	6 ft 0 in (1.83 m)	215 lb (98 kg)	So	Gresham, OR
19	RHP	A. J. Lattery	R/R	6 ft 5 in (1.96 m)	249 lb (113 kg)	Jr	Prior Lake, MN
20	RHP	Victor Quinn	R/R	6 ft 1 in (1.85 m)	216 lb (98 kg)	So	O'Fallon, MO
21	INF	Ely Kennel	L/R	6 ft 0 in (1.83 m)	191 lb (87 kg)	Fr	Monmouth, OR
22	INF	Jacob Krieg	R/R	6 ft 5 in (1.96 m)	240 lb (109 kg)	Fr	Antioch, CA
23	OF	Canon Reeder	R/R	6 ft 0 in (1.83 m)	175 lb (79 kg)	Fr	Bend, OR
25	RHP	Joey Mundt	R/R	6 ft 5 in (1.96 m)	224 lb (102 kg)	RS Jr	Hughson, CA
28	RHP	Rhett Larson	L/R	6 ft 2 in (1.88 m)	203 lb (92 kg)	Jr	Forest Grove, OR
29	RHP	Trent Sellers	R/R	6 ft 2 in (1.88 m)	205 lb (93 kg)	Sr	Kennewick, WA
31	C	Easton Talt	L/R	5 ft 10 in (1.78 m)	180 lb (82 kg)	Fr	Everett, WA
32	RHP	AJ Hutcheson	L/R	5 ft 11 in (1.8 m)	185 lb (84 kg)	Fr	Elk Grove, CA
33	LHP	Justin Thorsteinson	L/L	6 ft 4 in (1.93 m)	240 lb (109 kg)	Jr	Langley, British Columbia
34	RHP	Ian Lawson	R/R	6 ft 7 in (2.01 m)	246 lb (112 kg)	Jr	Hillsboro, OR
35	RHP	Jacob Kmatz	R/R	6 ft 3 in (1.91 m)	219 lb (99 kg)	So	Albuquerque, NM
36	LHP	Nelson Keljo	L/L	6 ft 4 in (1.93 m)	221 lb (100 kg)	Fr	Portland, OR
37	INF	Travis Bazzana	L/R	6 ft 0 in (1.83 m)	202 lb (92 kg)	So	Sydney, Australia
39	RHP	David Grewe	R/R	6 ft 2 in (1.88 m)	185 lb (84 kg)	So	Richland, WA
40	RHP	Jaren Hunter	R/R	6 ft 2 in (1.88 m)	224 lb (102 kg)	Jr	Damascus, OR
44	INF	Garret Forrester	R/R	6 ft 1 in (1.85 m)	208 lb (94 kg)	Jr	Fair Oaks, CA
48	LHP	Tyler Mejia	L/L	6 ft 3 in (1.91 m)	192 lb (87 kg)	Fr	Castle Rock, CO
50	RHP	Ryan Brown	R/R	6 ft 2 in (1.88 m)	219 lb (99 kg)	RS So	Salem, OR
51	RHP	Ben Ferrer	R/R	6 ft 0 in (1.83 m)	215 lb (98 kg)	Sr	Alpharetta, GA
54	INF	Tyce Peterson	R/R	5 ft 10 in (1.78 m)	200 lb (91 kg)	Fr	Kirkland, WA
55	RHP	Braden Boisvert	R/R	6 ft 1 in (1.85 m)	220 lb (100 kg)	Jr	Sonoita, AZ
60	RHP	Aiden Jimenez	R/R	6 ft 3 in (1.91 m)	216 lb (98 kg)	Fr	Elk Grove, CA

Head coach

Mitch Canham

Assistant coach(es)

Darwin Barney
Ryan Gipson

Pitching coach(es)

Rich Dorman

Legend

- (C) Team captain
- (S) Suspended
- (I) Ineligible
- Injured
- Current redshirt

Roster
Last update: February 15, 2023

== Schedule and results ==
2023 Oregon State Beavers baseball game log
Regular season
February (6–1)

Date	Opponent	Rank	Site/stadium	Score	Win	Loss	Save	Overall record	Pac12 record
Feb 17	vs. New Mexico*		Surprise Stadium • Surprise, AZ	2–7	Egloff (1–0)	**Sellers (0–1)**	McBroom	0–1	
Feb 18	vs. Minnesota*		Surprise Stadium • Surprise, AZ	8–7	**Larson (1–0)**	Klassen (0–1)	**Brown (1)**	1–1	
Feb 19	vs. New Mexico*		Surprise Stadium • Surprise, AZ	14–6	**Hutcheson (1–0)**	Russell (0–1)	None	2–1	
Feb 20	vs. UC Santa Barbara*		Surprise Stadium • Surprise, AZ	11–0^{8}	**Lawson (1–0)**	Bremner (0–1)	None	3–1	
Feb 24	vs. Coppin State*		Goss Stadium at Coleman Field • Corvallis, OR	11–1	**Sellers (1–1)**	McCallum (1–1)	None	4–1	
Feb 25	vs. Coppin State*		Goss Stadium at Coleman Field • Corvallis, OR	16–0	**Kmatz (1–0)**	Herrand (1–1)	None	5–1	
Feb 26	vs. Coppin State*		Goss Stadium at Coleman Field • Corvallis, OR	19–5	**Lattery (1–0)**	Hamberg (0–1)	None	6–1	

March (10–8)

Date	Opponent	Rank	Site/stadium	Score	Win	Loss	Save	Overall record	Pac12 record
Mar 2	at Cal Poly*		Robin Baggett Stadium • San Luis Obispo, CA	5–4	**Lattery (2–0)**	True (0–2)	**Brown (2)**	7–1	
Mar 3	at Cal Poly*		Robin Baggett Stadium • San Luis Obispo, CA	7–2	**Jimenez (1–0)**	Warreck (1–1)	**Mejia (1)**	8–1	
Mar 4	at Cal Poly*		Robin Baggett Stadium • San Luis Obispo, CA	2–4	Weston (1–1)	**Kmatz (1–1)**	Scott (1)	8–2	
Mar 4	at Cal Poly*		Robin Baggett Stadium • San Luis Obispo, CA	3–1	**Hunter (1–0)**	Baum (1–2)	**Brown (3)**	9–2	
Mar 7	vs. San Diego*	No. 25	Goss Stadium at Coleman Field • Corvallis, OR	9–4	**Thorsteinson (1–0)**	Negrete (1–1)	None	10–2	
Mar 10	vs. Washington State	No. 25	Goss Stadium at Coleman Field • Corvallis, OR	5–1	**Sellers (2–1)**	Hawkins (1–2)	None	11–2	1–0
Mar 11	vs. Washington State	No. 25	Goss Stadium at Coleman Field • Corvallis, OR	3–6	Kaelber (3–0)	**Kmatz (1–2)**	Grillo (4)	11–3	1–1
Mar 12	vs. Washington State	No. 25	Goss Stadium at Coleman Field • Corvallis, OR	1–3	Wilford (2–0)	**Hunter (1–1)**	Grillo (5)	11–4	1–2
Mar 14	vs. Nevada*		Goss Stadium at Coleman Field • Corvallis, OR	1–5	Stumbo (2–1)	**Larson (1–1)**	None	11–5	1–2
Mar 15	vs. Nevada*		Goss Stadium at Coleman Field • Corvallis, OR	12–1	**Grewe (1–0)**	Biesterfeld (0–2)	None	12–5	1–2
Mar 17	at No. 9 Stanford		Klein Field at Sunken Diamond • Stanford, CA	8–9	Dowd (1–1)	**Sellers (2–2)**	Bruno (2)	12–6	1–3
Mar 18	at No. 9 Stanford		Klein Field at Sunken Diamond • Stanford, CA	5–8	Scott (3–0)	**Kmatz (1–3)**	None	12–7	1–4
Mar 19	at No. 9 Stanford		Klein Field at Sunken Diamond • Stanford, CA	4–5	Dowd (2–1)	**Ferrer (0–1)**	Pancer (1)	12–8	1–5
Mar 21	vs. Portland*		Goss Stadium at Coleman Field • Corvallis, OR	8–6	**Brown (1–0)**	Hebert (0–3)	None	13–8	1–5
Mar 24	vs. California		Goss Stadium at Coleman Field • Corvallis, OR	5–3	**Sellers (3–2)**	Turkington (0–1)	**Brown (4)**	14–8	2–5
Mar 25	vs. California		Goss Stadium at Coleman Field • Corvallis, OR	1–2	Pasqualott (2–0)	**Kmatz (1–4)**	Bougie (1)	14–9	2–6
Mar 26	vs. California		Goss Stadium at Coleman Field • Corvallis, OR	2–1	**Brown (2–0)**	Aivazian (0–1)	None	15–9	3–6
Mar 29	at Seattle*		Bannerwood Park • Bellevue, WA	6–5	**Kelijo (1–0)**	Alberghini (0–1)	**Jimenez (1)**	16–9	3–6
Mar 31	at Washington		Husky Ballpark • Seattle, WA	**POSTPONED**					

April (14–4)

Date	Opponent	Rank	Site/stadium	Score	Win	Loss	Save	Overall record	Pac12 record
Apr 1	at Washington		Husky Ballpark • Seattle, WA	6–3	**Sellers (4–2)**	Lord (3–2)	**Brown (5)**	17–9	4–6
Apr 1	at Washington		Husky Ballpark • Seattle, WA	5–1	**Kmatz (2–4)**	Flesland (3–1)	None	18–9	5–6
Apr 2	at Washington		Husky Ballpark • Seattle, WA	2–7	Engman (2–1)	**Krieg (0–1)**	Emanuels (3)	18–10	5–7
Apr 6	at No. 25 Oregon		PK Park • Eugene, OR	**POSTPONED**					
Apr 7	at No. 25 Oregon		PK Park • Eugene, OR	0–2	Stoffal (4–2)	**Sellers (4–3)**	Mollerus (5)	18–11	5–8
Apr 8	at No. 25 Oregon		PK Park • Eugene, OR	4–2	**Lawson (2–0)**	Grabmann (0–2)	**Brown (6)**	19–11	6–8
Apr 9	at No. 25 Oregon		PK Park • Eugene, OR	12–2	**Lattery (3–0)**	Uelmen (2–3)	None	20–11	7–8
Apr 10	vs. Gonzaga*		Goss Stadium at Coleman Field • Corvallis, OR	**CANCELED – RAINED OUT**					
Apr 11	vs. Gonzaga*		Goss Stadium at Coleman Field • Corvallis, OR	15–1	**Mejia (1–0)**	Graham (0–3)	None	21–11	7–8
Apr 14	vs. No. 23 USC		Goss Stadium at Coleman Field • Corvallis, OR	10–4	**Sellers (5–3)**	Stromsborg (4–2)	**Brown (7)**	22–11	8–8
Apr 15	vs. No. 23 USC		Goss Stadium at Coleman Field • Corvallis, OR	3–2^{13}	**Brown (3–0)**	Johnson (2–3)	None	23–11	9–8
Apr 16	vs. No. 23 USC		Goss Stadium at Coleman Field • Corvallis, OR	6–3	**Lattery (4–0)**	Hammond (2–3)	**Ferrer (1)**	24–11	10–8
Apr 18	vs. Seattle*	No. 21	Goss Stadium at Coleman Field • Corvallis, OR	8–2	**Larson (2–1)**	Hogan (0–6)	None	25–11	10–8
Apr 21	at No. 19 Arizona State	No. 21	Phoenix Municipal Stadium • Phoenix, AZ	13–11	**Sellers (6–3)**	Dunn (4–3)	**Brown (8)**	26–11	11–8
Apr 22	at No. 19 Arizona State	No. 21	Phoenix Municipal Stadium • Phoenix, AZ	7–11	Stevenson (2–1)	**Brown (3–1)**	None	26–12	11–9
Apr 23	at No. 19 Arizona State	No. 21	Phoenix Municipal Stadium • Phoenix, AZ	10–12	Stevenson (3–1)	**Jimenez (1–1)**	Pivaroff (2)	26–13	11–10
Apr 24	at Grand Canyon*	No. 22	Brazell Field at GCU Ballpark • Phoenix, AZ	13–2	**Larson (3–1)**	Heaton (1–1)	None	27–13	11–10
Apr 28	vs. Arizona	No. 22	Goss Stadium at Coleman Field • Corvallis, OR	2–1	**Jimenez (2–1)**	Barraza (1–1)	None	28–13	12–10
Apr 29	vs. Arizona	No. 22	Goss Stadium at Coleman Field • Corvallis, OR	10–4	**Kmatz (3–4)**	Zastrow (4–3)	None	29–13	13–10
Apr 30	vs. Arizona	No. 22	Goss Stadium at Coleman Field • Corvallis, OR	11–10	**Brown (4–1)**	Barraza (1–2)	None	30–13	14–10

May (9–3)

Date	Opponent	Rank	Site/stadium	Score	Win	Loss	Save	Overall record	Pac12 record
May 2	vs. No. 17 Oregon*	No. 15	Goss Stadium at Coleman Field • Corvallis, OR	11–6	**Grewe (2–0)**	Pace (2–2)	None	31–13	14–10
May 5	vs. Utah	No. 15	Goss Stadium at Coleman Field • Corvallis, OR	9–13	Harris (2–3)	**Sellers (6–4)**	Ashman (9)	31–14	14–11
May 6	vs. Utah	No. 15	Goss Stadium at Coleman Field • Corvallis, OR	6–5	**Kmatz (4–4)**	Jones (2–3)	**Ferrer (2)**	32–14	15–11
May 7	vs. Utah	No. 15	Goss Stadium at Coleman Field • Corvallis, OR	11–4	**Jimenez (3–1)**	Day (3–5)	None	33–14	16–11
May 9	at Portland*	No. 15	Ron Tonkin Field • Hillsboro, OR	4–2	**Lawson (3–0)**	Gartrell (4–4)	None	34–14	16–11
May 12	at UCLA	No. 15	Jackie Robinson Stadium • Los Angeles, CA	5–12	Brooks (6–5)	**Sellers (6–5)**	None	34–15	16–12
May 13	at UCLA	No. 15	Jackie Robinson Stadium • Los Angeles, CA	6–4	**Ferrer (1–1)**	Austin (4–4)	**Brown (9)**	35–15	17–12
May 14	at UCLA	No. 15	Jackie Robinson Stadium • Los Angeles, CA	21–5	**Keljo (2–0)**	Aldrich (3–3)	**Mejia (2)**	36–15	18–12
May 16	vs. Portland*	No. 10	Goss Stadium at Coleman Field • Corvallis, OR	8–14	Segel (3–1)	**Jimenez (3–2)**	None	36–16	18–12
May 18	vs. Western Carolina*	No. 10	Goss Stadium at Coleman Field • Corvallis, OR	20–7	**Ferrer (2–1)**	Todd (2–4)	None	37–16	18–12
May 19	vs. Western Carolina	No. 10	Goss Stadium at Coleman Field • Corvallis, OR	23–5	**Kmatz (5–4)**	Ingle (0–3)	None	38–16	18–12
May 20	vs. Western Carolina	No. 10	Goss Stadium at Coleman Field • Corvallis, OR	8–4	**Jimenez (4–2)**	Mortenson (0–5)	**Brown (10)**	39–16	18–12

Postseason
Pac-12 tournament (0–2)

Date	Opponent	Rank	Site/stadium	Score	Win	Loss	Save	Overall record	Pac-12 tournament record
May 24	vs. (8) Arizona	No. 10 (2)	Scottsdale Stadium • Scottsdale, AZ	12–13	Barraza (5–2)	**Brown (4–2)**	None	39–17	0–1
May 25	vs. (5) Arizona State	No. 10 (2)	Scottsdale Stadium • Scottsdale, AZ	10–14	Pivaroff (3–2)	**Larson (3–2)**	None	39–18	0–2

Baton Rouge Regional (2–2)

Date	Opponent	Rank	Site/stadium	Score	Win	Loss	Save	Overall record	Regional record
June 2	vs. (3) Sam Houston	No. 14 (2)	Alex Box Stadium, Skip Bertman Field • Baton Rouge, LA	18–2	**Sellers (7–5)**	Atkinson (9–5)	None	40–18	1–0
June 3	vs. No. 7 (1) LSU		Alex Box Stadium, Skip Bertman Field • Baton Rouge, LA	**POSTPONED**					
June 4	vs. No. 7 (1) LSU	No. 14 (2)	Alex Box Stadium, Skip Bertman Field • Baton Rouge, LA	5–6	Hurd (6–2)	**Ferrer (2–2)**	Guidry (2)	40–19	1–1
June 4	vs. (3) Sam Houston	No. 14 (2)	Alex Box Stadium, Skip Bertman Field • Baton Rouge, LA	3–1	**Jimenez (5–2)**	Wales (2–6)	**Brown (11)**	41–19	2–1
June 5	vs. No. 7 (1) LSU	No. 14 (2)	Alex Box Stadium, Skip Bertman Field • Baton Rouge, LA	7–13	Herring (4–2)	**Larson (3–2)**	None	41–20	2–2

- Win
- Loss
- Postponement/Tie
- Bold: Oregon State team member
- Rankings from D1 Baseball
- (#) Tournament seedings in parentheses.
- * indicates a non-conference game.

== Baton Rouge Regional ==
Baton Rouge Regional Teams
No. 5 (1) LSU Tigers	(2) Oregon State Beavers	(3) Sam Houston Bearkats	(4) Tulane Green Wave

First Round
1	5 LSU	7
4	Tulane	2
2	Oregon State	18
3	Sam Houston	2
Lower round 1
3	Sam Houston	10
4	Tulane	2

Semi-Finals
1	5 LSU	6
2	Oregon State	5
Lower final
2	Oregon State	3
3	Sam Houston	1

Finals
1	5 LSU	13
2	Oregon State	7

== Rankings ==
Ranking movements Legend: ██ Increase in ranking ██ Decrease in ranking — = Not ranked
	Week																
Poll	Pre	1	2	3	4	5	6	7	8	9	10	11	12	13	14	15	Final
Coaches'	23	23*	24	22	—	—	—	—	—	25	—	20	18	18	14	17	25
Baseball America	18	19	19	15	22	—	—	—	—	19	22	19	17	17	17	19	—
Collegiate Baseball^	27	28	18	15	23	—	—	—	—	—	—	—	23	18	17	18	22
NCBWA†	23	26	26	24	26	—	—	—	—	27	27	20	18	16	13	21	26
D1Baseball	—	—	—	25	—	—	—	—	—	21	22	15	15	10	10	14	23

^ Collegiate Baseball ranked 40 teams in their preseason poll, but only ranked 30 teams weekly during the season.
† NCBWA ranks 30 teams in their preseason poll, but only ranks 25 teams weekly during the season.
* A new poll was not released for this week, so for comparison purposes, the previous week's ranking is inserted in this week's slot.
