= 2023 UCLA Bruins baseball team =

2023 season of the University of California, Los Angeles baseball team

2023 UCLA Bruins baseball
- Conference: Pac-12 Conference
- Record: 27–24–1 (12–16–1 Pac-12)
- Head coach: John Savage (19th season)
- Hitting coach: Bryant Ward (9th season)
- Home stadium: Jackie Robinson Stadium

2023 Pac-12 Conference baseball standings
	Conf.						Overall
Team	W		L		T	PCT	W		L		T	PCT
No. 4 Stanford ‍†‍‍^{y}	23	–	7	–	0	.767	38	–	16	–	0	.704
No. 23 Oregon State ‍‍‍^{y}	18	–	12	–	0	.600	39	–	18	–	0	.684
Washington ‍‍‍^{y}	17	–	12	–	0	.586	35	–	18	–	0	.660
USC ‍‍‍	17	–	13	–	0	.567	34	–	23	–	1	.595
Arizona State ‍‍‍	16	–	13	–	0	.552	32	–	23	–	0	.582
No. 12 Oregon ‍‍‡‍^{y}	16	–	14	–	0	.533	38	–	20	–	0	.655
UCLA ‍‍‍	12	–	16	–	1	.431	28	–	24	–	1	.538
Arizona ‍‍‍^{y}	12	–	18	–	0	.400	33	–	24	–	0	.579
California ‍‍‍	12	–	18	–	0	.400	24	–	28	–	0	.462
Washington State ‍‍‍	10	–	19	–	0	.345	29	–	23	–	0	.558
Utah ‍‍‍	9	–	20	–	1	.317	22	–	32	–	1	.409
† – Conference champion ‡ – Tournament champion y – Invited to the NCAA Division I Baseball Championship; As of May 30, 2023; Rankings from D1Baseball

The 2023 UCLA Bruins baseball team represent the University of California, Los Angeles during the 2023 NCAA Division I baseball season. The Bruins play their home games at Jackie Robinson Stadium as a member of the Pac-12 Conference. They are led by head coach John Savage, in his 19th season at UCLA.

== Previous season ==
The Bruins finished with a record of 40–24, and 19–11 in conference play In the postseason, the Bruins were invited and participated in the 2022 NCAA Division I baseball tournament, where they lost to Auburn in the Auburn Regional in Auburn, Alabama.

== Personnel ==
=== Roster ===
2023 UCLA Bruins roster
Pitchers: 7 – Ethan Flanagan – Sophomore; 10 – Nate Leibold – Sophomore; 11 – Ben Jacobs – Freshman; 12 – Gage Jump – Sophomore; 14 – Charles Harrison – Senior; 16 – Jack O'Connor – Freshman; 20 – Josh Alger – Sophomore; 25 – Cody Delvecchio – Freshman; 28 – James Hepp – Sophomore; 29 – Finn McIllroy – Freshman; 30 – Alonzo Tredwell – Sophomore; 31 – Chris Aldrich – (redshirt) Sophomore; 32 – Josh Hahn – Senior; 33 – Jake Saum – Senior; 34 – Jake Brooks – Junior; 35 – Luke Jewett – Sophomore; 40 – Michael Barnett – Freshman; 45 – Chris Grothues – Freshman; 51 – Caedon Kottinger – Junior; 55 – Kelly Austin – (redshirt) Senior	Catchers: 9 – Darius Perry – Senior; 17 – Jack Holman – Sophomore; 19 – Aidan Berger – (redshirt) Freshman; 36 – Knox Loposer – Graduate; Infielders: 1 – Cody Schrier – Sophomore; 3 – Duce Gourson – Sophomore; 4 – Kyle Karros – Junior; 5 – Daylen Reyes – Junior; 6 – Payton Brennan – Freshman; 8 – Andrew Walters – Freshman; 38 – AJ Salgado – (redshirt) Sophomore	Outfielders: 6 – Payton Brennan – Freshman; 15 – Jarrod Hocking – Freshman; 18 – Carson Yates – Junior; 21 – JonJon Vaughns – Junior; 24 – Malakhi Knight – Sophomore; 27 – Keenan Proctor – Freshman; 32 – Josh Hahn – Senior; 44 – Toussaint Bythewood – Freshman

=== Coaches ===
2022 UCLA Bruins baseball coaching staff
- John Savage – Head coach – 19th season
- Bryant Ward – Assistant coach – 8th season
- Niko Gallego – Assistant coach – 9th season
- David Berg – Volunteer assistant coach – 5th season

Note: Season counter accounts for all stints at UCLA.

== Schedule ==
2023 UCLA Bruins game log (27–24–1)
Regular season: 28–24–1 (Home: 19–9–1; Away: 8–14 Neutral: 1–1)

February: 5–2
Game	Date	Rank	Opponent	Stadium	Score	Win	Loss	Save	Attendance	Overall	Pac-12
1	February 17	12	Omaha*	Jackie Robinson Stadium; Los Angeles, California	16–1	Brooks (1–0)	Riedel (0–1)	—	727	1–0	–
2	February 18	12	Omaha*	Jackie Robinson Stadium; Los Angeles, California	23–0	Tredwell (1–0)	Bell (0–1)	—	776	2–0	–
3	February 19	12	Omaha*	Jackie Robinson Stadium; Los Angeles, California	8–1	Austin (1–0)	Tenney (0–1)	—	810	3–0	–
4	February 21	13	Pepperdine*	Jackie Robinson Stadium; Los Angeles, California	11–2	Aldrich (1–0)	Llewellyn (0–1)	—	350	4–0	–
5	February 24	17	at No. 10 Vanderbilt*	Hawkins Field; Nashville, Tennessee	0–6	Holton (0–1)	Brooks (1–1)	—	3,788	4–1	–
6	February 25	17	at No. 10 Vanderbilt*	Hawkins Field; Nashville, Tennessee	3–0	Delvecchio (1–0)	Hliboki (0–2)	Jewett (1)	3,793	5–1	–
7	February 26	17	at No. 10 Vanderbilt*	Hawkins Field; Nashville, Tennessee	1–2	Futrell (2–0)	Austin (1–1)	Maldonado (2)	3,798	5–2	–
–	February 29		Loyola Marymount*	Jackie Robinson Stadium; Los Angeles, California	Postponed (weather)					5–2	–

March: 11–5
Game	Date	Rank	Opponent	Stadium	Score	Win	Loss	Save	Attendance	Overall	Pac-12
8	March 1	12	Michigan*	Jackie Robinson Stadium; Los Angeles, California	9–4	Aldrich (2–0)	Denner (0–2)	—	458	6–2	–
9	March 3	12	Tulane*; Southern California College Baseball Classic	Jackie Robinson Stadium; Los Angeles, California	10–3	Brooks (2–1)	Carmouche (0–2)	—	419	7–2	–
10	March 4	12	Sacramento State*; Southern California College Baseball Classic	Jackie Robinson Stadium; Los Angeles, California	3–2	Tredwell (2–0)	Lucchesi (2–1)	Jewett (2)	540	8–2	–
11	March 5	12	USC*; Rivalry; Southern California College Baseball Classic	Jackie Robinson Stadium; Los Angeles, California	5–3	Saum (1–0)	Hammond (0–1)	—	1,845	9–2	–
12	March 10	12	Long Beach State*	Jackie Robinson Stadium; Los Angeles, California	7–6	McIllroy (1–0)	Diez (0–1)	Jewett (3)	480	10–2	–
13	March 10	13	at Oregon	PK Park; Eugene, Oregon	2–6	Dallas (1–0)	Brooks (2–2)	—	1,158	10–3	0–1
14	March 11	13	at Oregon	PK Park; Eugene, Oregon	8–7	Tredwell (3–0)	Uelmen (1–2)	—	2,008	11–3	1–1
15	March 12	13	at Oregon	PK Park; Eugene, Oregon	16–0	Austin (2–1)	Pace (1–1)	—	1,345	12–3	2–1
–	March 14		San Diego*	Jackie Robinson Stadium; Los Angeles, California	Postponed (weather)					12–3	2–1
16	March 17	12	Arizona	Jackie Robinson Stadium; Los Angeles, California	5–1	Brooks (3–2)	Nichols (3–1)	—	574	13–3	3–1
17	March 18	12	Arizona	Jackie Robinson Stadium; Los Angeles, California	7–5	Barnett (1–0)	Zastrow (2–1)	Jewett (4)	654	14–3	4–1
18	March 19	12	Arizona	Jackie Robinson Stadium; Los Angeles, California	6–4	Aldrich (3–0)	Hintz (0–1)	—	513	15–3	5–1
19	March 24	7	Washington	Jackie Robinson Stadium; Los Angeles, California	5–1	Brooks (4–2)	Lord (3–1)	—	811	16–3	6–1
20	March 25	7	Washington	Jackie Robinson Stadium; Los Angeles, California	0–3	Emanuels (2–1)	Jewett (0–1)	—	860	16–4	6–2
21	March 26	7	Washington	Jackie Robinson Stadium; Los Angeles, California	10–11	Boyle (3–0)	Aldrich (3–1)	Matter (4)	1,010	16–5	6–3
22	March 28	12	at Cal State Fullerton*	Goodwin Field; Fullerton, California	5–15	Faulks (1–1)	Jacobs (0–1)	—	1,361	16–6	6–4
23	March 31	12	at Washington State	Bailey–Brayton Field; Pullman, Washington	5–9	Hawkins (3–3)	Brooks (4–3)	—	583	16–7	6–5

April: 8–8–1
Game	Date	Rank	Opponent	Stadium	Score	Win	Loss	Save	Attendance	Overall	Pac-12
24	April 1	12	at Washington State	Bailey–Brayton Field; Pullman, Washington	1–5	Taylor (2–1)	Tredwell (3–1)	—	1,380	16–8	6–6
–	April 2	12	at Washington State	Bailey–Brayton Field; Pullman, Washington	Postponed (weather)					16–8	6–6
25	April 4	22	at Long Beach State*	Blair Field; Long Beach, California	4–3 (13)	Jewett (1–1)	Wallerstedt (0–1)	—	2,201	17–8	6–6
26	April 6	22	Utah	Jackie Robinson Stadium; Los Angeles, California	5–3	Austin (3–1)	Lugo-Canchola (2–2)	Delvecchio (1)	510	18–8	7–6
27	April 7	22	Utah	Jackie Robinson Stadium; Los Angeles, California	1–0	Harrison (1–0)	Ashman (1–1)	—	620	19–8	8–6
28	April 8	22	Utah	Jackie Robinson Stadium; Los Angeles, California	10–10	—	—	—	615	19–8–1	8–6–1
29	April 11		at Pepperdine*	Eddy D. Field Stadium; Malibu, California	7–8	Baird (2–2)	Delvecchio (1–1)	—	845	19–9–1	8–6–1
30	April 14	19	UC Davis*	Jackie Robinson Stadium; Los Angeles, California	3–2	Flanagan (1–0)	Carrion (0–3)	Delvecchio (2)	510	20–9–1	8–6–1
31	April 15	19	UC Davis*	Jackie Robinson Stadium; Los Angeles, California	8–2	Tredwell (4–1)	Huezo (1–2)	—	1,042	21–9–1	8–6–1
32	April 16	19	UC Davis*	Jackie Robinson Stadium; Los Angeles, California	3–6	Carrion (1–3)	Austin (3–2)	Hogan; 4	620	21–10–1	8–6–1
33	April 18	22	UC Irvine*	Jackie Robinson Stadium; Los Angeles, California	4–12	Vizcaino (4–2)	Flanagan (1–1)	—	490	21–11–1	8–6–1
34	April 21	22	@ USC; Rivalry	Dedeaux Field; Los Angeles, California	9–3	Brooks (5–3)	Stromsborg (4–3)	—	2,057	22–11–1	9–6–1
35	April 22	22	@ USC; Rivalry	Dedeaux Field; Los Angeles, California	1–5	Aoki (3–0)	Tredwell (4–2)	—	1,276	22–12–1	9–7–1
36	April 23	22	@ USC; Rivalry	Dedeaux Field; Los Angeles, California	5–6	Clarke (2–2)	Delvecchio (1–2)	—	1,882	22–13–1	9–8–1
37	April 25		@ Loyola Marymount*	George C. Page Stadium; Los Angeles, California	7–1	Leibold (1–0)	McRoberts (0–2)	—	507	23–13–1	9–8–1
38	April 28		@ No. 8 Stanford	Klein Field at Sunken Diamond; Stanford, California	5–6	Mathews (5–3)	Brooks (5–4)	Bruno (4)	2,146	23–14–1	9–9–1
39	April 29		@ No. 8 Stanford	Klein Field at Sunken Diamond; Stanford, California	9–6	Austin (4–2)	Scott (5–3)	—	2,126	24–14–1	10–8–1
40	April 30		@ No. 8 Stanford	Klein Field at Sunken Diamond; Stanford, California	7–10	Bruno (2–0)	Delvecchio (1–3)	—	2,593	24–15–1	10–9–1

May: 3–8
Game	Date	Rank	Opponent	Stadium	Score	Win	Loss	Save	Attendance	Overall	Pac-12
41	May 2		@ UC Irvine*	Anteater Ballpark; Irvine, California	3–12	Antone (3–1)	Hahn (0–1)	—	2,469	24–16–1	10–9–1
42	May 5		California	Jackie Robinson Stadium; Los Angeles, California	7–10	Becerra (2–3)	Brooks (5–5)	Stasiowski (1)	717	24–17–1	10–10–1
43	May 6		California	Jackie Robinson Stadium; Los Angeles, California	2–9	Pasqualott (3–1)	Austin (4–3)	Galan (1)	1,177	24–18–1	10–11–1
44	May 7		California	Jackie Robinson Stadium; Los Angeles, California	8–9	Colwell (2–3)	Aldrich (3–2)	Bougie (3)	1,420	24–19–1	10–12–1
45	May 9		Cal State Fullerton*	Jackie Robinson Stadium; Los Angeles, California	10–2	McIllroy (2–0)	Blood (1–3)	—	713	25–19–1	10–12–1
46	May 12		No. 15 Oregon State	Jackie Robinson Stadium; Los Angeles, California	12–5	Brooks (6–5)	Sellers (6–5)	—	733	26–19–1	11–12–1
47	May 13		No. 15 Oregon State	Jackie Robinson Stadium; Los Angeles, California	4–6	Ferrer (1–1)	Austin (4–4)	Brown (9)	911	26–20–1	11–13–1
48	May 14		No. 15 Oregon State	Jackie Robinson Stadium; Los Angeles, California	5–21	Keljo (2–0)	Aldrich (3–3)	Mejia (2)	690	26–21–1	11–14–1
49	May 18		at Arizona State	Phoenix Municipal Stadium; Phoenix, Arizona	4–5	Stevenson (5–3)	Delvecchio (1–4)	—	2,379	26–22–1	11–15–1
50	May 19		at Arizona State	Phoenix Municipal Stadium; Phoenix, Arizona	6–3	Flanagan (2–1)	Dunn (4–6)	Delvecchio (3)	3,092	27–22–1	12–15–1
51	May 20		at Arizona State	Phoenix Municipal Stadium; Phoenix, Arizona	1–2	Stevenson (6–3)	Grothues (0–1)	—	2,495	27–23–1	12–16–1

Postseason: 1–1 (Home: 0–0; Away: 0–0; Neutral: 1–1)

2023 Pac–12 tournament: 1–1
Game	Date	Rank	Opponent	Stadium	Score	Win	Loss	Save	Attendance	Overall	P12T
52	May 23	(7)	vs. (4) USC	Scottsdale Stadium; Scottsdale, Arizona	4–6	Connolly (3–1)	Brooks (6–6)	Wisch (7)	2,032	27–24–1	0—1
53	May 24	(7)	vs. (3) Washington	Scottsdale Stadium; Scottsdale, Arizona	17–4 (7)	Austin (5–4)	Engman (3–4)	—	2,012	28—24–1	1—1

== Rankings ==
Ranking movements Legend: ██ Increase in ranking ██ Decrease in ranking — = Not ranked
	Week																			
Poll	Pre	1	2	3	4	5	6	7	8	9	10	11	12	13	14	15	16	17	18	Final
Coaches'	15	15*	12	12	12	8	12	22	19	22	—	—	—	—	—					
Baseball America	12	13	14	13	12	9	12	—	—	—	—	—	—	—	—					
Collegiate Baseball^	13	10	10	10	9	9	13	—	—	—	—	—	—	—	—					
NCBWA†	14	13	13	12	11	8	12	23	23	22	—	—	—	—	—					
D1Baseball	17	17	17	16	13	7	12	24	22	22	—	—	—	—	—					

^ Collegiate Baseball ranked 40 teams in their preseason poll, but only ranked 30 teams weekly during the season.
† NCBWA ranks 30 teams in their preseason poll, but only ranks 25 teams weekly during the season.
* A new poll was not released for this week, so for comparison purposes, the previous week's ranking is inserted in this week's slot.

== 2023 MLB draft ==
UCLA had six players selected in the 2023 MLB draft.

Player	Position	Round	Overall	MLB team
Alonzo Tredwell	RHP	2	61	Houston Astros
Kyle Karros	INF	5	145	Colorado Rockies
Charles Harrison	RHP	7	215	St. Louis Cardinals
Jake Brooks	RHP	11	323	Miami Marlins
Darius Perry	C	15	442	Colorado Rockies
Ethan Flanagan	LHP	17	506	Chicago Cubs
