= 2023 Arizona Wildcats baseball team =

2023 Arizona Wildcats baseball

Fayetteville Regional, 0–2
- Conference: Pac-12 Conference
- Record: 33–26 (12–18 Pac-12)
- Head coach: Chip Hale (2nd season)
- Assistant coaches: Dave Lawn (8th season); Trip Couch (2nd season); Toby Demello (2nd season)
- Home stadium: Hi Corbett Field

2023 Pac-12 Conference baseball standings
	Conf.						Overall
Team	W		L		T	PCT	W		L		T	PCT
No. 4 Stanford ‍†‍‍^{y}	23	–	7	–	0	.767	38	–	16	–	0	.704
No. 23 Oregon State ‍‍‍^{y}	18	–	12	–	0	.600	39	–	18	–	0	.684
Washington ‍‍‍^{y}	17	–	12	–	0	.586	35	–	18	–	0	.660
USC ‍‍‍	17	–	13	–	0	.567	34	–	23	–	1	.595
Arizona State ‍‍‍	16	–	13	–	0	.552	32	–	23	–	0	.582
No. 12 Oregon ‍‍‡‍^{y}	16	–	14	–	0	.533	38	–	20	–	0	.655
UCLA ‍‍‍	12	–	16	–	1	.431	28	–	24	–	1	.538
Arizona ‍‍‍^{y}	12	–	18	–	0	.400	33	–	24	–	0	.579
California ‍‍‍	12	–	18	–	0	.400	24	–	28	–	0	.462
Washington State ‍‍‍	10	–	19	–	0	.345	29	–	23	–	0	.558
Utah ‍‍‍	9	–	20	–	1	.317	22	–	32	–	1	.409
† – Conference champion ‡ – Tournament champion y – Invited to the NCAA Division I Baseball Championship; As of May 30, 2023; Rankings from D1Baseball

The 2023 Arizona Wildcats baseball team represented the University of Arizona during the 2023 NCAA Division I baseball season. The Wildcats played their home games for the 12th season at Hi Corbett Field. The team was coached by Chip Hale in his 2nd season at Arizona. The Wildcats finished 8th in the Pac-12, but advanced to the final of the Pac-12 Conference Tournament losing to Oregon 4–5. The Wildcats were selected into the NCAA tournament for the 3rd straight year for the first time since 2010–12.

== Previous season ==
The Wildcats finished the 2022 season with a record of 39–25 (16–14 Conf.), good for a 5th place conference finish. In the inaugural Pac-12 Conference Baseball Tournament in Scottsdale, AZ, the Wildcats defeated Oregon and Arizona State but lost twice to eventual champion Stanford to finish in 4th place. The team subsequently was selected to the postseason for a second consecutive season for the first time since 2016–2017. They were placed in the Coral Gables Regional where they went 2-2, eliminating both Canisius and host #6 Miami but losing twice to Ole Miss to end their season.

== Preseason ==
During the offseason, the Wildcats participated in 4 fall exhibition games. On October 6 the team participated in the Mexican Baseball Fiesta held at Tucson's Kino Veterans Memorial Stadium, playing the Naranjeros de Hermosillo of the Mexican Pacific League to a 6–6 tie. Arizona next played Pima Community College on October 15 at Hi Corbett Field in a game in which the score was not released. The Wildcats concluded the preseason on October 22 with 11-6 and 5-4 wins over UNLV in a doubleheader at Hi Corbett Field.

== Personnel ==
=== Roster ===
2023 Arizona Wildcats roster
Pitchers • 16 - Casey Hintz - Freshman • 22 - Jackson Kent - Freshman • 25 - TJ Nichols - Junior • 27 - Dawson Netz - Junior • 28 - Josh Randall - Sophomore • 29 - Eric Orloff - Sophomore • 34 - Anthony Susac - Sophomore • 35 - Tyler Davis - Junior • 36 - George Arias Jr. - Senior • 37 - Tony Pluta - Freshman • 38 - Cameron Walty - Junior • 40 - Kenan Elarton - Freshman • 43 - Aiden May - Sophomore • 45 - Derek Drees - Senior • 46 - Chris Barraza - Senior • 48 - Bradon Zastrow - Senior • 51 - Trevor Long - Junior • 52 - Hayden Lewis - Freshman	Catchers • 8 - Colton Moore - Senior • 14 - Kade Huff - Freshman • 17 - Luke Moeller - Freshman • 50 - Cameron Laliberte - Junior Infielders • 1 - Garen Caulfield - Sophomore • 2 - Jack Grant - Sophomore • 3 - Tony Bullard - Senior • 10 - Xavier Esquer - Freshman • 11 - Nik McClaughry - Senior • 33 - Maddox Mihalakis - Freshman • 44 - Trevor Schmidt - Freshman	Outfielders • 4 - Brendan Summerhill - Freshman • 5 - Chase Davis - Junior • 7 - Mac Bingham - Junior • 13 - Tyler Casagrande - Senior • 23 - TJ Adams - Freshman • 24 - Mason White - Freshman • 26 - Emilio Corona - Junior Utility • 12 - Kiko Romero - Junior • 20 - Tommy Splaine - Sophomore

=== Coaches ===
2023 Arizona Wildcats baseball coaching staff
- Chip Hale - Head coach
- Dave Lawn - Assistant coach
- Trip Couch - Assistant coach
- Toby Demello - Volunteer assistant coach

=== Opening day ===
Opening Day Starters
Name	Position
Nik McClaughry	Shortstop
Chase Davis	Left fielder
Garen Caulfield	Second baseman
Kiko Romero	First baseman
Mac Bingham	Center fielder
Mason White	Designated hitter
Tony Bullard	Third baseman
Tommy Splaine	Catcher
Tyler Casagrande	Right fielder
TJ Nichols	Starting pitcher

== Schedule and results ==
2023 Arizona Wildcats baseball game log
Regular season
Date	Opponent	Rank	Site/Stadium	Score	Win	Loss	Save	Overall Record	Pac-12 Record
Feb 17	vs. #2 Tennessee		Salt River Fields at Talking Stick • Scottsdale, AZ	W 3–1	Nichols (1–0)	Dollander (0–1)	Long (1)	1–0	
Feb 18	vs. Fresno State		Sloan Park • Mesa, AZ	L 0–5	Dixon (1–0)	Susac (0–1)	Garcia (1)	1–1	
Feb 19	vs. Michigan State		Salt River Fields at Talking Stick • Scottsdale, AZ	W 7–1	Zastrow (1–0)	Matheny (0–1)	None	2–1	
Feb 20	vs. UC San Diego		Sloan Park • Mesa, AZ	W 9–8	Long (1–0)	Soberon (0–1)	None	3–1	
Feb 24	West Virginia		Hi Corbett Field • Tucson, AZ	L 5–6	Reed (1–0)	Long (1–1)	None	3–2	
Feb 25	West Virginia		Hi Corbett Field • Tucson, AZ	L 1–5	Traxel (1–1)	Susac (0–2)	None	3–3	
Feb 26	West Virginia		Hi Corbett Field • Tucson, AZ	W 15–5	Netz (1–0)	Siegel (1–1)	None	4–3	
Feb 28	California Baptist		Hi Corbett Field • Tucson, AZ	W 16–7	May (1–0)	Downer (1–3)	None	5–3	
Mar 3	North Dakota State		Hi Corbett Field • Tucson, AZ	W 8–6	Nichols (2–0)	Feeney (0–3)	Long (2)	6–3	
Mar 4	North Dakota State		Hi Corbett Field • Tucson, AZ	W 7–6	Drees (1–0)	Jacobs (0–2)	None	7–3	
Mar 5	North Dakota State		Hi Corbett Field • Tucson, AZ	W 11–1	Zastrow (2–0)	Roehrich (0–3)	None	8–3	
Mar 7	at Grand Canyon		Brazell Field • Phoenix, AZ	W 12–10	Netz (2–0)	Tucker (1–1)	Long (3)	9–3	
Mar 10	California		Hi Corbett Field • Tucson, AZ	W 13–2	Nichols (3–0)	Stamos (2–2)	None	10–3	1–0
Mar 11	California		Hi Corbett Field • Tucson, AZ	W 7–5	Barraza (1–0)	Sullivan (1–1)	Long (4)	11–3	2–0
Mar 12	California		Hi Corbett Field • Tucson, AZ	W 10–5	May (2–0)	Bougie (1–1)	None	12–3	3–0
Mar 15	at Cal State Fullerton	-	Goodwin Field • Fullerton, CA	Cancelled	–	–	–	–	–
Mar 17	at #13 UCLA		Jackie Robinson Stadium • Los Angeles, CA	L 1–5	Brooks (3–2)	Nichols (3–1)	None	12–4	3–1
Mar 18	at #13 UCLA		Jackie Robinson Stadium • Los Angeles, CA	L 5–7	Barnett (1–0)	Zastrow (2–1)	Jewett (4)	12–5	3–2
Mar 19	at #13 UCLA		Jackie Robinson Stadium • Los Angeles, CA	L 4–6	Aldrich (3–0)	Hintz (0–1)	None	12–6	3–3
Mar 21	Utah Tech		Hi Corbett Field • Tucson, AZ	W 11–2	Orloff (1–0)	West (1–1)	None	13–6	
Mar 24	at Arizona State		Phoenix Municipal Stadium • Phoenix, AZ	L 5–6	Tieding (3–0)	Nichols (3–2)	Pivaroff (1)	13–7	3–4
Mar 25	at Arizona State		Phoenix Municipal Stadium • Phoenix, AZ	L 4–7	Lebamoff (2–0)	Hintz (0–2)	Stevenson (1)	13–8	3–5
Mar 26	at Arizona State		Phoenix Municipal Stadium • Phoenix, AZ	L 6–10	Manning (1–2)	May (2–1)	None	13–9	3–6
Mar 28	Grand Canyon		Hi Corbett Field • Tucson, AZ	W 10–9	Long (2–1)	Omlid (0–1)	None	14–9	
Mar 31	Oregon		Hi Corbett Field • Tucson, AZ	L 3–15	Stoffal (3–2)	Nichols (3–3)	None	14–10	3–7
Apr 1	Oregon		Hi Corbett Field • Tucson, AZ	L 11–13	Dallas (4–0)	Long (2–2)	Mollerus (3)	14–11	3–8
Apr 2	Oregon		Hi Corbett Field • Tucson, AZ	L 5–8	Anderson (2–0)	May (2–2)	Mollerus (4)	14–12	3–9
Apr 6	Washington		Hi Corbett Field • Tucson, AZ	L 8–15	Shinn (1–0)	Long (2–3)	None	14–13	3–10
Apr 7	Washington		Hi Corbett Field • Tucson, AZ	W 12–4	Zastrow (3–1)	Lord (3–3)	Nichols (1)	15–13	4–10
Apr 8	Washington		Hi Corbett Field • Tucson, AZ	W 11–2	May (3–2)	Engman (2–2)	None	16–13	5–10
Apr 11	New Mexico State		Hi Corbett Field • Tucson, AZ	W 14–2	Walty (1–0)	Hoeft (0–5)	None	17–13	
Apr 14	at Washington State		Bailey-Brayton Field • Pullman, WA	L 3–6	Liss (1–0)	Nichols (3–4)	Wilfford (1)	17–14	5–11
Apr 15	at Washington State		Bailey-Brayton Field • Pullman, WA	L 8–15	Baughn (5–0)	Zastrow (3–2)	Grillo (6)	17–15	5–12
Apr 16	at Washington State		Bailey-Brayton Field • Pullman, WA	W 14–8	Drees (2–0)	Liss (1–1)	None	18–15	6–12
Apr 19	Arizona State		Hi Corbett Field • Tucson, AZ	W 20–0	Walty (2–0)	Manning (1–3)	None	19–15	
Apr 21	Utah		Hi Corbett Field • Tucson, AZ	W 14–9	Orloff (2–0)	Van Sickle (2–5)	None	20–15	7–12
Apr 22	Utah		Hi Corbett Field • Tucson, AZ	W 19–2	Zastrow (4–2)	Jones (2–2)	None	21–15	8–12
Apr 23	Utah		Hi Corbett Field • Tucson, AZ	W 9–5	May (4–2)	Day (3–4)	None	22–15	9–12
Apr 25	New Mexico		Hi Corbett Field • Tucson, AZ	W 11–8	Walty (3–0)	Jackson (2–1)	Barraza (1)	23–15	
Apr 28	at Oregon State		Goss Stadium • Corvallis, OR	L 1–2	Jimenez (2–1)	Barraza (1–1)	None	23–16	9–13
Apr 29	at Oregon State		Goss Stadium • Corvallis, OR	L 4–10	Kmatz (3–4)	Zastrow (4–3)	None	23–17	9–14
Apr 30	at Oregon State		Goss Stadium • Corvallis, OR	L 10–11	Brown (4–1)	Barraza (1–2)	None	23–18	9–15
May 2	at Grand Canyon		Brazell Field • Phoenix, AZ	L 3–4	Ohl (3–1)	Long (2–4)	None	23–19	
May 5	Air Force		Hi Corbett Field • Tucson, AZ	W 16–4	Walty (4–0)	Sansing (5–4)	None	24–19	
May 6	Air Force		Hi Corbett Field • Tucson, AZ	L 0–5	Gehring (4–3)	Zastrow (4–4)	Hawks (7)	24–20	
May 7	Air Force		Hi Corbett Field • Tucson, AZ	W 11–10	Barraza (2–2)	Weber (2–2)	None	25–20	
May 10	Nevada		Hi Corbett Field • Tucson, AZ	W 11–9	Barraza (3–2)	Ray (0–1)	None	26–20	
May 12	at #4 Stanford		Sunken Diamond • Palo Alto, CA	L 8–9	Dowd (8–2)	Long (2–5)	None	26–21	9–16
May 13	at #4 Stanford		Sunken Diamond • Palo Alto, CA	L 2–9	Dixon (5–0)	Zastrow (4–5)	None	26–22	9–17
May 14	at #4 Stanford		Sunken Diamond • Palo Alto, CA	W 21–20	Barraza (4–2)	Bruno (2–1)	None	27–22	10–17
May 15	UC Irvine		Anteater Ballpark • Irvine, CA	W 4–3	Susac (1–2)	Brooks (2–1)	Orloff (1)	28–22	
May 18	USC		Hi Corbett Field • Tucson, AZ	Postponed	-	-	-	-	-
May 19	USC		Hi Corbett Field • Tucson, Arizona	W 13–4	Walty (5–0)	Sodersten (4–3)	None	29–22	11–17
May 19	USC		Hi Corbett Field • Tucson, AZ	W 6–3	Zastrow (5–5)	Aoki (4–2)	Long (5)	30–22	12–17
May 20	USC		Hi Corbett Field • Tucson, AZ	L 6–14	Wisch (2–1)	Nichols (3–5)	None	30–23	12–18
Pac-12 Conference Tournament
May 23	(5) Arizona State	(8)	Scottsdale Stadium • Scottsdale, AZ	W 12–3	May (5–2)	Hansell (2–1)	None	31–23	
May 24	(2) Oregon State	(8)	Scottsdale Stadium • Scottsdale, AZ	W 13–12	Barraza (5–2)	Brown (4–2)	None	32–23	
May 26	(1) #3 Stanford	(8)	Scottsdale Stadium • Scottsdale, AZ	W 14–4	Zastrow (6–5)	Mathews (7–4)	None	33–23	
May 27	(6) Oregon	(8)	Scottsdale Stadium • Scottsdale, AZ	L 4–5	Spoljaric (6–0)	Hintz (0–3)	Dallas (3)	33–24	
Fayetteville Regional
Jun 2	vs. (2) #17 TCU	(3)	Baum–Walker Stadium • Fayetteville, AR	L 4–12	Savage (5–3)	Walty (5–1)	None	33–25	
Jun 3	vs. (4) Santa Clara	(3)	Baum–Walker Stadium • Fayetteville, AR	L 3–9	Pilchard (4–1)	May (5–3)	Feikes (1)	33–26	

=== Fayetteville Regional ===
Fayetteville Regional Teams
(1) Arkansas Razorbacks	(4) Santa Clara Broncos	(2) TCU Horned Frogs	(3) Arizona Wildcats

== 2023 MLB draft ==
Player	Position	Round	Overall	MLB team
Chase Davis	OF	1	21	St. Louis Cardinals
TJ Nichols	RHP	6	183	Tampa Bay Rays
Kiko Romero	INF	7	222	New York Yankees
Chris Barraza	RHP	10	294	Los Angeles Angels
Nik McClaughry	INF	10	311	San Diego Padres
