= 2023 Pac-12 Conference baseball tournament =

American college baseball tournament

- Teams: 9
- Format: See below
- Finals site: Scottsdale Stadium; Scottsdale, Arizona
- Champions: Oregon (1st title)
- Winning coach: Mark Wasikowski (1st title)
- MVP: Chase Davis (Arizona)
- Attendance: 11,010
- Television: Pac-12 Network; ESPN2

2023 Pac-12 Conference baseball standings
	Conf.						Overall
Team	W		L		T	PCT	W		L		T	PCT
No. 4 Stanford ‍†‍‍^{y}	23	–	7	–	0	.767	38	–	16	–	0	.704
No. 23 Oregon State ‍‍‍^{y}	18	–	12	–	0	.600	39	–	18	–	0	.684
Washington ‍‍‍^{y}	17	–	12	–	0	.586	35	–	18	–	0	.660
USC ‍‍‍	17	–	13	–	0	.567	34	–	23	–	1	.595
Arizona State ‍‍‍	16	–	13	–	0	.552	32	–	23	–	0	.582
No. 12 Oregon ‍‍‡‍^{y}	16	–	14	–	0	.533	38	–	20	–	0	.655
UCLA ‍‍‍	12	–	16	–	1	.431	28	–	24	–	1	.538
Arizona ‍‍‍^{y}	12	–	18	–	0	.400	33	–	24	–	0	.579
California ‍‍‍	12	–	18	–	0	.400	24	–	28	–	0	.462
Washington State ‍‍‍	10	–	19	–	0	.345	29	–	23	–	0	.558
Utah ‍‍‍	9	–	20	–	1	.317	22	–	32	–	1	.409
† – Conference champion ‡ – Tournament champion y – Invited to the NCAA Division I Baseball Championship; As of May 30, 2023; Rankings from D1Baseball

The 2023 Pac-12 Conference baseball tournament was held from May 23 through 27 at Scottsdale Stadium in Scottsdale, Arizona. It was the second postseason championship event sponsored by the Pac-12 Conference since 1978.

Oregon won the tournament and the league's automatic bid to the 2023 NCAA Division I baseball tournament.

== Seeds ==
This tournament featured 9 out of 11 teams in this conference (Colorado does not field a baseball team) . Matchups composed of three teams in each pool, with each team playing two games in pool play, with the three pool winners & one wild card team advancing to the single elimination finals. The winning percentage of the teams in conference play determined the tournament seedings. There are tiebreakers in place to seed teams with identical conference records.

Seed	School	Conf.	Over.	Tiebreaker
#1	Stanford	23–7	37–14	
#2	Oregon State	18–12	39–16	
#3	Washington	17–12	33–16	
#4	USC	17–13	33–22–1	
#5	Arizona State	16–13	31–22	
#6	Oregon	16–14	33–20	
#7	UCLA	12–16–1	27–23–1	
#8	Arizona	12–18	30–23	3–0 Vs California
#9	California	12–18	24–26	0–3 Vs Arizona

== Pools composition ==
There will be three teams in each pool, with each team playing two games in pool play. Teams selected for pool play will be based on final standings in the 2023 Pac-12 Regular Season. The Number 1, 6 & 9 seeds will be placed in pool A. The Number 2, 5 & 8 seeds will be placed in pool B. The Number 3, 4 & 7 seeds will be placed in pool C. The three pools will play a round-robin style tournament with the winners advancing to the Friday single-elimination semifinals along with one Wild Card team. The Wild Card will be determined by the best record of the non-advancing teams. Any tiebreaker will be awarded to the highest seeded team.

Pool A	Pool B	Pool C
#1 Stanford Cardinal	#2 Oregon State Beavers	#3 Washington Huskies
#6 Oregon Ducks	#5 Arizona State Sun Devils	#4 USC Trojans
#9 California Golden Bears	#8 Arizona Wildcats	#7 UCLA Bruins

=== Pool A ===
	Pool A	STAN	ORE	CAL
1	Stanford		6−8	18−10
6	Oregon	8−6		3−2
9	California	10−18	2−3	

Pos	Team	Pld	W	L	RF	RA	RD	PCT	Qualification
1	(6) Oregon	2	2	0	11	8	+3	1.000	Advanced to Semifinals
2	(1) Stanford	2	1	1	24	18	+6	.500	Advanced to Semifinals
3	(9) California	2	0	2	12	21	−9	.000	Eliminated

May 23; 7:00 p.m. Game 3	(9) California	2–3	(6) Oregon	Scottsdale Stadium; Attendance: 2,032; Umpires: Joe Maiden, Steve Mattingly, Travis Reininger, Patrick Riley
May 23; 7:00 p.m. Game 3	LP: T. Stasiowsk (0–2)		WP: L. Mercado (5–1); Sv: J. Mollerus (9)	Scottsdale Stadium; Attendance: 2,032; Umpires: Joe Maiden, Steve Mattingly, Travis Reininger, Patrick Riley
May 23; 7:00 p.m. Game 3	HR: none		HR: none	Scottsdale Stadium; Attendance: 2,032; Umpires: Joe Maiden, Steve Mattingly, Travis Reininger, Patrick Riley

May 24; 7:00 p.m. Game 6	(1) Stanford	18–10	(9) California	Scottsdale Stadium; Attendance: 2,012; Umpires: Randy Sutton, Mark Buchanan, Joe Burleson, Kellen Levy
May 24; 7:00 p.m. Game 6	WP: B. Pancer (2–0)		LP: R. Aivazian (0–4)	Scottsdale Stadium; Attendance: 2,012; Umpires: Randy Sutton, Mark Buchanan, Joe Burleson, Kellen Levy
May 24; 7:00 p.m. Game 6	HR: Montgomery (16), Rios (18)		HR: Lomavita (17)	Scottsdale Stadium; Attendance: 2,012; Umpires: Randy Sutton, Mark Buchanan, Joe Burleson, Kellen Levy

May 25; 7:00 p.m. Game 9	(6) Oregon	8–6 (F/10 inn.)	(1) Stanford	Scottsdale Stadium; Attendance: 2,384; Umpires: Ramon Armendariz, Angel Campos, Kellen Levy, Jake Uhlenhopp
May 25; 7:00 p.m. Game 9	WP: J. Mollerus (2–2)		LP: B. Pancer (2–1)	Scottsdale Stadium; Attendance: 2,384; Umpires: Ramon Armendariz, Angel Campos, Kellen Levy, Jake Uhlenhopp
May 25; 7:00 p.m. Game 9	HR: Ceballos (16)		HR: Graham (18)	Scottsdale Stadium; Attendance: 2,384; Umpires: Ramon Armendariz, Angel Campos, Kellen Levy, Jake Uhlenhopp

=== Pool B ===
	Pool B	OSU	ASU	ARIZ
2	Oregon State		10−14	12−13
5	Arizona State	14−10		3−12
8	Arizona	13−12	12−3	

Pos	Team	Pld	W	L	RF	RA	RD	PCT	Qualification
1	(8) Arizona	2	2	0	24	15	+9	1.000	Advanced to Semifinals
2	(5) Arizona State	2	1	1	17	22	−5	.500	Eliminated
3	(2) Oregon State	2	0	2	22	27	−5	.000	Eliminated

May 23; 10:00 a.m. Game 1	(8) Arizona	12–3	(5) Arizona State	Scottsdale Stadium; Attendance: 2,032; Umpires: Nathan White, Randy Sutton, Mark Buchanan, Joe Burleston
May 23; 10:00 a.m. Game 1	WP: A. May (5–2)		LP: J. Hansell (2–1)	Scottsdale Stadium; Attendance: 2,032; Umpires: Nathan White, Randy Sutton, Mark Buchanan, Joe Burleston
May 23; 10:00 a.m. Game 1	HR: McClaughry (4), Caulfield (5)		HR: none	Scottsdale Stadium; Attendance: 2,032; Umpires: Nathan White, Randy Sutton, Mark Buchanan, Joe Burleston

May 24; 10:00 a.m. Game 4	(2) Oregon State	12–13	(8) Arizona	Scottsdale Stadium; Attendance: 2,012; Umpires: Jake Uhlenhopp, Ramon Armendariz, Angel Campos, Nathan White
May 24; 10:00 a.m. Game 4	LP: R. Brown (4–2)		WP: C. Barraza (5–2)	Scottsdale Stadium; Attendance: 2,012; Umpires: Jake Uhlenhopp, Ramon Armendariz, Angel Campos, Nathan White
May 24; 10:00 a.m. Game 4	HR: none		HR: C. Davis (20), K. Romero (18), T Bullard (11)	Scottsdale Stadium; Attendance: 2,012; Umpires: Jake Uhlenhopp, Ramon Armendariz, Angel Campos, Nathan White

May 25; 10:00 a.m. Game 7	(5) Arizona State	14–10	(2) Oregon State	Scottsdale Stadium; Attendance: 2,384; Umpires: Travis Reininger, Patrick Riley, Joe Maiden, Steve Mattingly
May 25; 10:00 a.m. Game 7	WP: B. Pivaroff (3–2)		LP: R. Larson (3–2)	Scottsdale Stadium; Attendance: 2,384; Umpires: Travis Reininger, Patrick Riley, Joe Maiden, Steve Mattingly
May 25; 10:00 a.m. Game 7	HR: Keaschall (18)		HR: Guerra (11)	Scottsdale Stadium; Attendance: 2,384; Umpires: Travis Reininger, Patrick Riley, Joe Maiden, Steve Mattingly

=== Pool C ===
	Pool C	WASH	USC	UCLA
3	Washington		8−3	4−17
4	USC	3−8		6−4
7	UCLA	17−4	4−6	

Pos	Team	Pld	W	L	RF	RA	RD	PCT	Qualification
1	(3) Washington	2	1	1	12	20	−8	.500	Advanced to Semifinals
2	(4) USC	2	1	1	9	12	−3	.500	Eliminated
3	(7) UCLA	2	1	1	21	10	+11	.500	Eliminated

May 23; 2:30 p.m. Game 2	(7) UCLA	4–6	(4) USC	Scottsdale Stadium; Attendance: 2,032; Umpires: Kellen Levy, Jake Uhlenhopp, Ramon Armendariz, Angel Campos
May 23; 2:30 p.m. Game 2	LP: J. Brooks (6–6)		WP: C. Connolly (3–1); Sv: K. Wisch (7)	Scottsdale Stadium; Attendance: 2,032; Umpires: Kellen Levy, Jake Uhlenhopp, Ramon Armendariz, Angel Campos
May 23; 2:30 p.m. Game 2	HR: none		HR: Overn (4)	Scottsdale Stadium; Attendance: 2,032; Umpires: Kellen Levy, Jake Uhlenhopp, Ramon Armendariz, Angel Campos

May 24; 2:30 p.m. Game 5	(3) Washington	4–17 (F/7 inn.)	(7) UCLA	Scottsdale Stadium; Attendance: 2,012; Umpires: Steve Mattingly, Travis Reininger, Patrick Riley, Joe Maiden
May 24; 2:30 p.m. Game 5	LP: J. Engman (3–4)		WP: K. Austin (5–4)	Scottsdale Stadium; Attendance: 2,012; Umpires: Steve Mattingly, Travis Reininger, Patrick Riley, Joe Maiden
May 24; 2:30 p.m. Game 5	HR: Morales (11)		HR: Holmen (13), Hahn (1)	Scottsdale Stadium; Attendance: 2,012; Umpires: Steve Mattingly, Travis Reininger, Patrick Riley, Joe Maiden

May 25; 2:30 p.m. Game 8	(4) USC	3–8	(3) Washington	Scottsdale Stadium; Attendance: 2,384; Umpires: Mark Buchanan, Joe Burleson, Nathan White, Randy Sutton
May 25; 2:30 p.m. Game 8	LP: C. Aoki (3–4)		WP: S. Flesland III (7–2); Sv: C. Matter (5)	Scottsdale Stadium; Attendance: 2,384; Umpires: Mark Buchanan, Joe Burleson, Nathan White, Randy Sutton
May 25; 2:30 p.m. Game 8	HR: none		HR: none	Scottsdale Stadium; Attendance: 2,384; Umpires: Mark Buchanan, Joe Burleson, Nathan White, Randy Sutton

== Finals ==
Semifinals May 26
3	Washington	7
6	Oregon	12
1	Stanford	4
8	Arizona	14^{(7 inn.)}

Final May 27
6	Oregon	5
8	Arizona	4

May 26; 2:30 p.m. Game 10	No. 6 Oregon	12–7	No. 3 Washington	Scottsdale Stadium; Attendance: 2,563; Umpires: Patrick Riley, Kellen Levy, Jake Uhlenhopp, Mark Buchanan
May 26; 2:30 p.m. Game 10	WP: G. Grinsell (2–1)		LP: K. Lord (6–5)	Scottsdale Stadium; Attendance: 2,563; Umpires: Patrick Riley, Kellen Levy, Jake Uhlenhopp, Mark Buchanan
May 26; 2:30 p.m. Game 10	HR: Ceballos (16)		HR: Morales (13)	Scottsdale Stadium; Attendance: 2,563; Umpires: Patrick Riley, Kellen Levy, Jake Uhlenhopp, Mark Buchanan

May 26; 7:00 p.m. Game 11	No. 8 Arizona	14–4 (F/7 inn.)	No. 1 Stanford	Scottsdale Stadium; Attendance: 2,563; Umpires: Joe Burleson, Steve Mattingly, Nathan White, Ramon Armendariz
May 26; 7:00 p.m. Game 11	WP: B. Zastrow (6–5)		LP: Q. Mathews (7–4)	Scottsdale Stadium; Attendance: 2,563; Umpires: Joe Burleson, Steve Mattingly, Nathan White, Ramon Armendariz
May 26; 7:00 p.m. Game 11	HR: C. Davis (21), M. White (8)		HR: T. Troy (16)	Scottsdale Stadium; Attendance: 2,563; Umpires: Joe Burleson, Steve Mattingly, Nathan White, Ramon Armendariz

May 27; 7:00 p.m. Game 12	No. 8 Arizona	4–5	No. 6 Oregon	Scottsdale Stadium; Attendance: 4,051; Umpires: Angel Campos, Travis Reininger, Ramon Armendariz, Joe Burleson
May 27; 7:00 p.m. Game 12	LP: C. Hintz (0–3)		WP: T. Spoljaric (6–0); Sv: M. Dallas (3)	Scottsdale Stadium; Attendance: 4,051; Umpires: Angel Campos, Travis Reininger, Ramon Armendariz, Joe Burleson
May 27; 7:00 p.m. Game 12	HR: K. Romero (19), T. Bullard (12)		HR: T. Walsh (14)	Scottsdale Stadium; Attendance: 4,051; Umpires: Angel Campos, Travis Reininger, Ramon Armendariz, Joe Burleson

== Schedule ==
2023 Bracket, home teams listed last.

Game	Time*	Matchup^{#}	Score	Television	Attendance
Pool Play – Tuesday, May 23
1	10:00 a.m.	**No. 8 Arizona** vs No. 5 Arizona State (Pool B)	12–3	Pac-12 Network	2,032
2	2:30 p.m.	No. 7 UCLA vs **No. 4 USC** (Pool C)	4–6	Pac-12 Network	2,032
3	7:00 p.m.	No. 9 California vs **No. 6 Oregon** (Pool A)	2–3	Pac-12 Network	2,032
Pool Play – Wednesday, May 24
4	10:00 a.m.	No. 2 Oregon State vs **No. 8 Arizona** (Pool B)	12–13	Pac-12 Network	2,012
5	2:30 p.m.	No. 3 Washington vs **No. 7 UCLA** (Pool C)	4–17 ^{(7 inn.)}	Pac-12 Network	2,012
6	7:00 p.m.	**No. 1 Stanford** vs No. 9 California (Pool A)	18–10	Pac-12 Network	2,012
Pool Play – Thursday, May 25
7	10:00 a.m.	**No. 5 Arizona State** vs No. 2 Oregon State (Pool B)	14–10	Pac-12 Network	2,384
8	2:30 p.m.	No. 4 USC vs **No. 3 Washington** (Pool C)	3–8	Pac-12 Network	2,384
9	7:00 p.m.	**No. 6 Oregon** vs No. 1 Stanford (Pool A)	8–6^{(10 inn.)}	Pac-12 Network	2,384
Semifinals – Friday, May 26
10	2:30 p.m.	**No. 6 Oregon** vs No. 3 Washington	12–7	Pac-12 Network	2,563
11	7:00 p.m.	**No. 8 Arizona** vs No. 1 Stanford	14–4^{(7 inn.)}	Pac-12 Network	2,563
Championship – Saturday, May 27
12	7:00 p.m.	No. 8 Arizona vs **No. 6 Oregon**	4–6	ESPN2	4,051
*Game times in MST. # – Rankings denote tournament seed.

=== All-tournament Team ===
The following players were members of the 2023 Pac-12 Baseball All-Tournament Team. Player in Bold selected as Tournament MVP.

Position	Player	School
C	Bennett Thompson	Oregon
1B	Carter Graham	Stanford
2B	Travis Bazzana	Oregon State
3B	Sabin Ceballos	Oregon
SS	Nik McClaughry	Arizona
DH	Tony Bullard	Arizona
OF	**Chase Davis**	Arizona
OF	Alberto Rios	Stanford
OF	Colby Shade	Oregon
P	Grayson Grinsell	Oregon
P	Bradon Zastrow	Arizona
