= Husky Ballpark =

Baseball park in Seattle, Washington, US

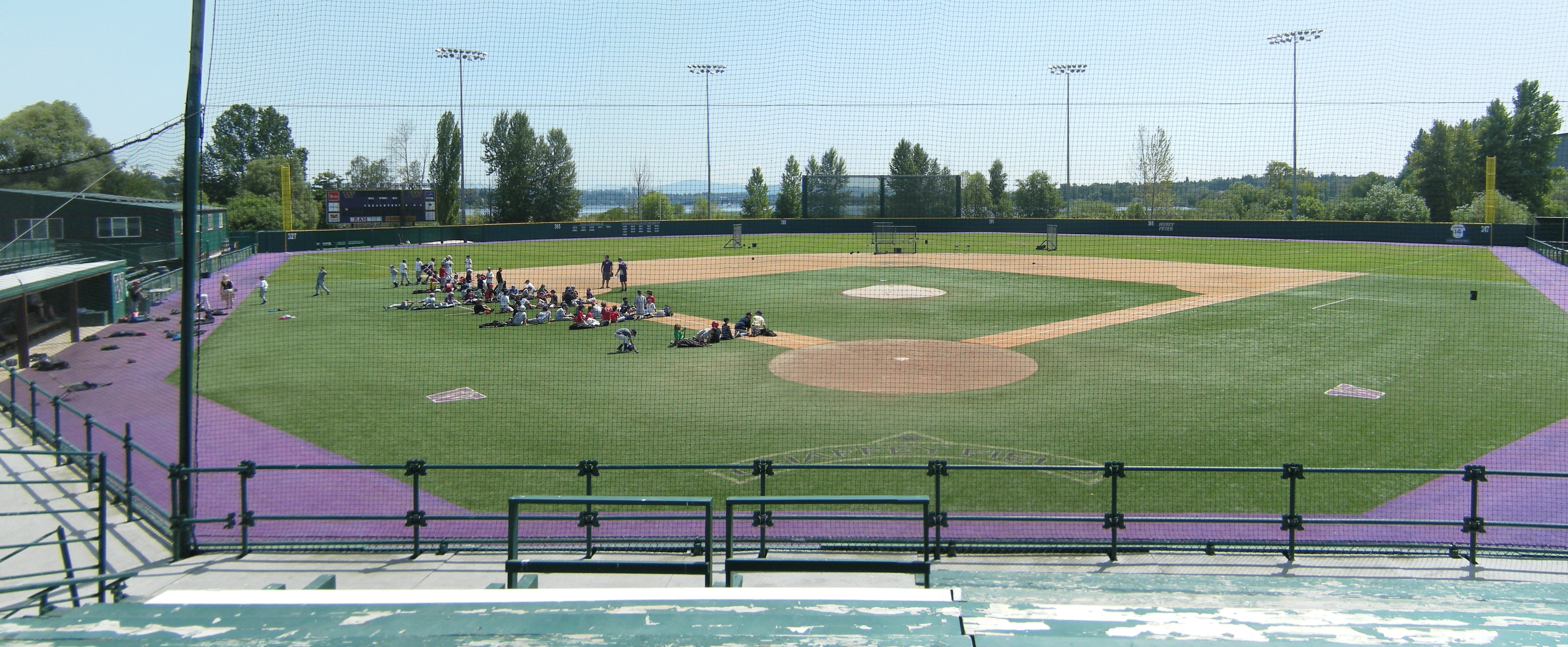
- Chaffey Field at Husky Ballpark in July 2009

- Location in the United States Location in Washington
- Interactive map of Husky Ballpark
- Location: University of Washington; Seattle, Washington, United States
- Coordinates: 47.655°N 122.299°W
- Owner: University of Washington
- Operator: University of Washington
- Capacity: 2,500 - (2014–present); 1,500 - (former)
- Surface: infield AstroTurf (2023–present); FieldTurf (2005–2023); AstroTurf (1998–2004) outfield AstroTurf (2023–present); FieldTurf (2014–2023); Natural grass (1998–2013)
- Field size: Left Field: 327 ft (100 m); L. Center: 365 ft (111 m); Center (L.): 385 ft (117 m); Center (R.): 395 ft (120 m); R. Center: 365 ft (111 m); Right Field: 317 ft (97 m)

Construction
- Groundbreaking: 1997
- Opened: March 21, 2014; 12 years ago (grandstand); February 27, 1998; 28 years ago
- Renovated: 2013–2014

Tenant
- Washington Huskies (NCAA) 1998–present

Husky Ballpark is a college baseball park in the Northwestern United States, located on the campus of the University of Washington in Seattle. Opened 28 years ago in 1998, it is the home field of the Washington Huskies of the Big Ten Conference. The playing field was renamed for donor Herb Chaffey in May 2009.

Husky Ballpark is located about 600 yards (550 m) north of Husky Stadium; the ballpark's left field wall borders wetlands adjacent to Union Bay. The UW's natural grass soccer stadium is adjacent to the north.

A new concrete grandstand was constructed after the 2013 season and opened on March 21, 2014, with an approximate seating capacity of 2,500. It formerly seated 1,500 in temporary bleachers.

== History ==
Opened for pre-season practice in early January 1998, Husky Ballpark hosted its first regular season game on February 27 against Gonzaga. Originally slated for a permanent concrete grandstand, the spectator seating area had temporary bleachers for its first 16 seasons. Construction on the concrete grandstand began after the 2013 season and was completed in March 2014. For its first seven seasons (1998–2004), the ballpark's infield was AstroTurf, with the standard cut-out sliding pits at all of the bases. Until 2004, it was the only artificial turf in the conference.

When FieldTurf was installed prior to the 2005 season, the dirt sliding pits at the three bases were eliminated. The only cut-out portions that remained dirt are the home plate area and the pitcher's mound. The basepaths and infield "skin" portion, normally dirt on a natural grass field, was gold-colored FieldTurf, and the warning track around the perimeter was purple. The outfield of Husky Ballpark was natural grass from 1998 through 2013; with excellent drainage, the bluegrass, rye, and fescue mix allowed play in all weather. With the renovation, the outfield was converted to FieldTurf for the 2014 season. During the summer months, the ballpark is used extensively by youth, semi-pro, and recreational teams.

The combination of an all FieldTurf infield and a natural grass outfield was similar to Goss Stadium at Coleman Field, Oregon State's ballpark in Corvallis, which installed a FieldTurf infield before the 2007 season. The two other Pac-12 ballparks in the Northwest are all synthetic, including the outfield. Bailey-Brayton Field in Pullman installed FieldTurf in the fall of 2003, while Oregon did not return to varsity competition until 2009, and its PK Park in Eugene is similarly configured. The conference expanded to twelve teams in the summer of 2011: Utah played on a natural grass field at Smith's Ballpark, while Colorado did not participate, having dropped its program decades earlier (in June 1980).

Unlike the other Northwest schools in the Pac-12, the home plate area remained dirt through the 2013 season; the others converted to FieldTurf at the home plate area, leaving just the pitcher's mound as dirt. Following the 2014 renovation, the entire field is now FieldTurf, except for the pitcher's mound, which remains dirt.

The lighted playing field at Husky Ballpark is oriented in an unorthodox configuration, with the batter and catcher facing southeast, resulting in difficult visual conditions for the fielders on the left side of the diamond for games played near sunset. (The recommended orientation of a baseball diamond is east-northeast.)

=== Chaffey Field ===
Husky Ballpark was renamed for donor Herb Chaffey in a ceremony on May 9, 2009. Chaffey is a 1961 graduate of the university and the founder of Chaffey Homes. The university board of regents approved the name change in July 2009, but later discovered that the athletic department's intent was to name only the playing field after Chaffey, not the entire facility. The board amended the action in January 2011 and now "Chaffey Field" refers to the playing field only.

=== 2011–2014 stadium construction ===
Ground was broken in late July 2011 on the first phase of a $20 million project that included a 2,200-seat covered concrete, steel, and masonry grandstand. A press box, concession stands, restrooms, suites, team locker room, equipment and medical training rooms, coaches and umpires locker facilities, and a video training area is included. The donors building provides a dual use team classroom/players' lounge and donor gathering space with a kitchen and viewing deck. The deck connects to a special external donor seating section. The new stadium was designed by SRG Partnership, and built by Bayley Construction.

The first stage of the project was the $4 million baseball operations building on the first base line, the Wayne Gittinger Team Building, which opened in March 2012. Gittinger (1933–2014) was a pitcher for the Huskies in the early 1950s out of Kellogg, Idaho, and was the substantial contributor for the funding of the 9,000-square-foot (840 m^{2}) facility.

Construction on the $15 million concrete stadium began after the 2013 season, and it opened in March 2014.

== Former venues ==
=== Graves Field ===
From the 1960s through the 1997 season, the Huskies played at Graves Field, an unlit natural grass field located at the northeast corner of campus. East of the golf driving range, its outfield wall bordered NE 45th Street in left and Union Bay Place (now Mary Gates Memorial Drive) in right; the approximate location of home plate was (47.66002°N 122.29383°W). In the pre-season of January and February, the Huskies normally did not practice on the field, but on the AstroTurf of Husky Stadium. It was named after former head coach Tubby Graves, who led the Huskies from 1923 to 1946, and was also an assistant coach for football and basketball.

Prior to Graves Field, the UW baseball field was adjacent to the north side of Hec Edmundson Pavilion, in the space now occupied by the outdoor varsity tennis courts and the Intramural Activities Building. The former concrete grandstand of the baseball field is directly east of the Tubby Graves Building and now serves as the Bill Quillian Stadium for tennis. The approximate location of home plate was (47.65293°N 122.30179°W), with the previous tennis courts adjacent (and perpendicular) to Montlake Boulevard. Most of the Montlake area was a landfill until the late 1950s.

=== Sick's Stadium ===
While Graves Field underwent renovations during the 1973 season, the program used Sick's Stadium in south Seattle as its home venue.

== See also ==
- List of NCAA Division I baseball venues
