= 2023 Stanford Cardinal baseball team =

American college baseball season

2023 Stanford Cardinal baseball

Pac–12 regular season champions Stanford Regional champions Stanford Super Regional champions

College World Series, 0–2
- Conference: Pac-12 Conference

Ranking
- Coaches: No. 6
- CB: No. 6
- Record: 44–20 (23–7 Pac-12)
- Head coach: David Esquer (6th season)
- Assistant coaches: Thomas Eager (6th season); Steve Rodriguez (4th season); Andre Mercurio (2nd season)
- Home stadium: Klein Field at Sunken Diamond

2023 Pac-12 Conference baseball standings
	Conf.						Overall
Team	W		L		T	PCT	W		L		T	PCT
No. 4 Stanford ‍†‍‍^{y}	23	–	7	–	0	.767	38	–	16	–	0	.704
No. 23 Oregon State ‍‍‍^{y}	18	–	12	–	0	.600	39	–	18	–	0	.684
Washington ‍‍‍^{y}	17	–	12	–	0	.586	35	–	18	–	0	.660
USC ‍‍‍	17	–	13	–	0	.567	34	–	23	–	1	.595
Arizona State ‍‍‍	16	–	13	–	0	.552	32	–	23	–	0	.582
No. 12 Oregon ‍‍‡‍^{y}	16	–	14	–	0	.533	38	–	20	–	0	.655
UCLA ‍‍‍	12	–	16	–	1	.431	28	–	24	–	1	.538
Arizona ‍‍‍^{y}	12	–	18	–	0	.400	33	–	24	–	0	.579
California ‍‍‍	12	–	18	–	0	.400	24	–	28	–	0	.462
Washington State ‍‍‍	10	–	19	–	0	.345	29	–	23	–	0	.558
Utah ‍‍‍	9	–	20	–	1	.317	22	–	32	–	1	.409
† – Conference champion ‡ – Tournament champion y – Invited to the NCAA Division I Baseball Championship; As of May 30, 2023; Rankings from D1Baseball

The 2023 Stanford Cardinal baseball team represented Stanford University in the 2023 NCAA Division I baseball season. The Cardinal played their home games at Klein Field at Sunken Diamond under sixth year coach David Esquer.

== Previous season ==
The Cardinal finished the regular season in first place and won the Pac-12 tournament. Stanford hosted their own Regional and won their Super Regional over UConn in three games. Stanford reached the College World Series for the first time in back-to-back seasons since 2002 and 2003. The Cardinal lost in their double elimination games against Arkansas and Auburn.

=== 2022 MLB draft ===
The Cardinal had seven players drafted in the 2022 MLB draft.

Player	Position	Round	Overall	MLB Team
Brock Jones	Outfield	2	65	Tampa Bay Rays
Kody Huff	Catcher	7	206	Colorado Rockies
Brett Barrera	Shortstop	8	250	New York Yankees
Adam Crampton	Shortstop	9	257	Baltimore Orioles
Alex Williams	Pitcher	11	322	Miami Marlins
Quinn Mathews	Pitcher	19	584	Tampa Bay Rays
Matt Scott	Pitcher	20	589	Texas Rangers

- Quinn Mathews did not sign with the Tampa Bay Rays and has returned to Stanford.
- Matt Scott did not sign out of high school with the Texas Rangers and will play college baseball at Stanford

== Departures ==
All Offseason Departures
Name	Number	Pos.	Height	Weight	Year	Hometown	Notes
Cody Jensen	18	Pitcher	6’2”	191 lbs	(redshirt) Junior	Roseville, CA	Transferred to Georgetown
Justin Moore	13	Pitcher	6’5”	235 lbs	(redshirt) Junior	Austin, TX	Transferred to Notre Dame
Vincent Martinez	16	Catcher	6’2”	235 lbs	Senior	San Marcos, CA	Transferred to Notre Dame
Austin Kretzschmar	5	INF	5’11”	197 lbs	Senior	La Mesa, CA	Transferred to Georgetown

== Incoming Recruits ==
2022 Stanford Recruits
Name	B/T	Pos.	Height	Weight	Hometown	High School	Source
Malcolm Moore	L/R	C/INF	6’2”	210 lbs	Sacramento, CA	C. K. McClatchy High School	
Matt Scott	R/R	P/1B/3B	6’6”	230 lbs	Redding, CT	Joel Barlow High School	
Nick Dugan	R/R	P	6’1”	190 lbs	Eureka, CA	St. Bernard's High School	
Gabe Springer	S/R	SS	6’1”	185 lbs	Boulder, CO	Fairview High School	
Toran O'Harran	R/R	P/OF	6’1”	190 lbs	Rocklin, CA	Rocklin High School	
Trevor Moore	R/R	P/SS	6’1”	200 lbs	Golden, CO	Mullen High School	
Ethan Hott	R/R	OF	5’10”	180 lbs	Paradise Valley, AZ	Chaparral High School	
Cort MacDonald	L/L	OF	6’1”	170 lbs	Arlington, TX	Pantego Christian Academy	
Jimmy Nati	R/R	SS/P	6’1”	210 lbs	West Pennant Hills, New South Wales	Oakhill College	

== Personnel ==
=== Roster ===
2023 Stanford Cardinal roster
Pitchers: 18 – Toran O'Harran – Freshman; 20 – Nathan Fleischli – Senior; 23 – Joey Dixon – Junior; 25 – Nick Dugan – Freshman; 26 – Quinn Mathews – Senior; 28 – Matt Scott – Freshman; 30 – Brandt Pancer – Junior; 34 – Ryan Bruno – Junior; 36 – Ty Uber – Sophomore; 37 – Tommy O'Rourke – Junior; 38 – Trevor Moore – Freshman; 40 – Nicolas Lopez – Graduate Student; 41 – Matt Swartz – (redshirt) Junior; 45 – Max Meier – Senior; 46 – Jaden Bruno – (redshirt) Sophomore; 49 – Drew Dowd – Junior	Catchers: 11 – Alberto Rios – Junior; 21 – Charlie Saum – Sophomore; Infielders: 2 – Drew Bowser – Junior; 5 – Trevor Haskins – Sophomore; 15 – Jimmy Nati – Freshman; 27 – Temo Becerra – Sophomore; 31 – Carter Graham – Junior; 33 – Gabe Springer – Freshman	Outfielders: 4 – Saborn Campbell – Sophomore; 13 – Ethan Hott – Freshman; 14 – Cort MacDonald – Freshman; 22 – Eddie Park – Junior; 29 – Cole Hinkleman – Senior; Utility: 1 – Owen Cobb (INF/OF) – Senior; 6 – Braden Montgomery (OF/P) – Sophomore; 10 - Malcolm Moore (C/1B) - Freshman; 12 – Tommy Troy (INF/OF) – Junior; 19 – Harry Gargus (INF/OF) – Senior; 39 – Jake Sapien (P/INF) – Junior; 44 – Brett Blair (OF/C) – Sophomore

=== Coaching staff ===
2023 Stanford Cardinal coaching staff
Name	Position
David Esquer	Clarke and Elizabeth Nelson Director of Baseball
Thomas Eager	Kathy Wolff Assistant Baseball Coach
Steve Rodriguez	Assistant Coach
Andre Mercurio	Assistant Coach
Jeanette Morganti	Director of Baseball Operations
CJ Baker	Video Coordinator

== Pac–12 media poll ==
Pac–12 media poll
Predicted finish	Team	Votes (1st place)
1	Stanford	99 (9)
2	UCLA	90 (2)
3	Oregon State	77
4	Arizona	74
5	Oregon	68
6	Arizona State	45
7	Washington	43
8	California	40
9	Washington State	29
10	USC	24
11	Utah	16

== Preseason Honors ==
=== All-Pac-12 Team ===
Preseason All-Pac-12 Baseball Team
Player	Position	Class
Drew Bowser	Infield	Junior
Ryan Bruno	Pitcher	Junior
Joey Dixon	Pitcher	Junior
Carter Graham	1st Base	Junior
Quinn Mathews	Pitcher	Senior
Braden Montgomery	OF/P	Sophomore
Eddie Park	OF	Junior
Tommy Troy	Infield	Junior

=== Preseason All-Americans ===
National Collegiate Baseball Writers Association
Player	No.	Position	Class	Team
Carter Graham	31	1st Base	Junior	1st Team
Braden Montgomery	6	OF/P	Sophomore	2nd Team
Quinn Mathews	26	Pitcher	Senior	2nd Team
Ryan Bruno	34	Pitcher	Junior	2nd Team
Tommy Troy	12	2nd Base	Junior	3rd Team

D1Baseball
Player	No.	Position	Class	Team
Tommy Troy	12	2nd Base	Junior	1st Team
Ryan Bruno	34	Pitcher	Junior	1st Team
Carter Graham	31	1st Base	Junior	2nd Team
Braden Montgomery	6	OF/P	Sophomore	3rd Team
Quinn Mathews	26	Pitcher	Senior	3rd Team

Baseball America
Player	No.	Position	Class	Team
Tommy Troy	12	2nd Base	Junior	1st Team
Ryan Bruno	34	Pitcher	Junior	2nd Team
Braden Montgomery	6	OF/P	Sophomore	2nd Team

=== Award watch lists ===
Award	Player	Position	Year
Golden Spikes Award	Quinn Mathews	P	Senior
Golden Spikes Award	Braden Montgomery	OF/P	Sophomore
Golden Spikes Award	Tommy Troy	INF/OF	Junior

== Schedule and results ==
Legend
	Stanford win
	Stanford loss
	Postponement
**Bold**	Stanford team member

2023 Stanford Cardinal baseball game log
Regular season
February (6–2)

Date	Opponent	Rank	Site/stadium	Score	Win	Loss	Save	TV	Attendance	Overall record	Pac12 record
Feb. 17	at Cal State Fullerton*	No. 3	Goodwin Field • Fullerton, CA	**L** 1–8	Stultz (1–0)	**Mathews** (0–1)	Chester (1)	ESPN+	1,732	0–1	
Feb. 18	at Cal State Fullerton*	No. 3	Goodwin Field • Fullerton, CA	**W** 7–5	**Scott** (1–0)	Meyer (0–1)	**Bruno** (1)	ESPN+	1,406	1–1	
Feb. 19	at Cal State Fullerton*	No. 3	Goodwin Field • Fullerton, CA	**W** 21–13	**Montgomery** (1–0)	Faulks (0–1)		ESPN+	1,771	2–1	
Feb. 21	California*	No. 2	Klein Field at Sunken Diamond • Stanford, CA	**L** 4–8	Williams (1–0)	**O'Harran** (0–1)		P12N	1,337	2–2	
Feb. 24	Rice*	No. 2	Klein Field at Sunken Diamond • Stanford, CA	**W** 6–3	**Mathews** (1–1)	Smith (0–1)	**Scott** (1)	P12N	1,159	3–2	
Feb. 25	Rice*	No. 2	Klein Field at Sunken Diamond • Stanford, CA	**W** 11–1	**Dixon** (1–0)	Rodriguez (0–1)		Stanford Live Stream-2	1,422	4–2	
Feb. 26	Rice*	No. 2	Klein Field at Sunken Diamond • Stanford, CA	**W** 7–4	**Scott** (2–0)	Brogdon (0–1)		Stanford Live Stream-2	1,422	5–2	
Feb. 27	Pacific*	No. 2	Klein Field at Sunken Diamond • Stanford, CA	**W** 15–5	**Lopez** (1–0)	Defe (0–1)		Stanford Live Stream	212	6–2	

March (11–4)

Date	Opponent	Rank	Site/stadium	Score	Win	Loss	Save	TV	Attendance	Overall record	Pac12 record
Mar. 3	Cal State Bakersfield*	No. 2	Klein Field at Sunken Diamond • Stanford, CA	**W** 7–1	**Mathews** (2–1)	Verdugo (2–1)		Stanford Live Stream-2	982	7–2	
Mar. 4	Cal State Bakersfield*	No. 2	Klein Field at Sunken Diamond • Stanford, CA	**W** 8–4	**Dixon** (2–0)	Scheurman (1–1)		Stanford Live Stream-2	1,143	8–2	
Mar. 5	Cal State Bakersfield*	No. 2	Klein Field at Sunken Diamond • Stanford, CA	**W** 24–9	**Lopez** (2–0)	Comnos (2–1)		Stanford Live Stream-3	1,196	9–2	
Mar. 7	Santa Clara*	No. 2	Klein Field at Sunken Diamond • Stanford, CA	**L** 5–10	Feikes (1–0)	**Moore** (0–1)		Stanford Live Stream	974	9–3	
Mar. 10	at USC	No. 2	Dedeaux Field • Los Angeles, CA	**W** 6–4	**Mathews** (3–1)	Connolly (0–1)	**Dowd** (1)	USC Live Stream	523	10–3	1–0
Mar. 11	at USC	No. 2	Dedeaux Field • Los Angeles, CA	**L** 7–10	Blum (2–0)	**Lopez** (2–1)	Clarke (1)	USC Live Stream	431	10–4	1–1
Mar. 12	at USC	No. 2	Dedeaux Field • Los Angeles, CA	**L** 1–4	Johnson (1–2)	**Dowd** (0–1)	Clarke (2)	USC Live Stream	708	10–5	1–2
Mar. 17	Oregon State	No. 9	Klein Field at Sunken Diamond • Stanford, CA	**W** 9–8	**Dowd** (1–1)	Sellers (2–2)	**Bruno** (2)	P12N	1,492	11–5	2–2
Mar. 18	Oregon State	No. 9	Klein Field at Sunken Diamond • Stanford, CA	**W** 8–5	**Scott** (3–0)	Kmatz (1–3)		P12 Bay Area	2,086	12–5	3–2
Mar. 19	Oregon State	No. 9	Klein Field at Sunken Diamond • Stanford, CA	**W** 5–4	**Dowd** (2–1)	Ferrer (0–1)	**Pancer** (1)	P12 Oregon	1,824	13–5	4–2
Mar. 25	Utah	No. 9	Klein Field at Sunken Diamond • Stanford, CA	**W** 6–4	**Dowd** (3–1)	McCleve (0–1)		Stanford Live Stream	1,445	14–5	5–2
Mar. 26	Utah	No. 9	Klein Field at Sunken Diamond • Stanford, CA	**W** 5–1	**Scott** (4–0)	Van Sickle (2–2)	**Dowd** (2)	Stanford Live Stream	1,446	15–5	6–2
Mar. 27	Utah	No. 9	Klein Field at Sunken Diamond • Stanford, CA	**W** 16–8	**Uber** (1–0)	Whiting (0–2)		Stanford Live Stream	1,093	16–5	7–2
Mar. 30	at Oklahoma*	No. 7	L. Dale Mitchell Baseball Park • Norman, OK	**W** 23–11	**Meier** (1–0)	Davis (2–3)		ESPN+	1,434	17–5	
Mar. 31	at Oklahoma*	No. 7	L. Dale Mitchell Baseball Park • Norman, OK	**L** 0–2	Douthit (4–1)	**Mathews** (3–2)	Atwood (1)	ESPN+	1,669	17–6	

April (11–7)

Date	Opponent	Rank	Site/stadium	Score	Win	Loss	Save	TV	Attendance	Overall record	Pac12 record
Apr. 1	at Oklahoma*	No. 7	L. Dale Mitchell Baseball Park • Norman, OK	**L** 5–6	Campbell (3–2)	**Dowd** (3–2)	Weber (5)	ESPN+	2,031	17–7	
Apr. 2	at Oklahoma*	No. 7	L. Dale Mitchell Baseball Park • Norman, OK	**W** 16–5	**Dixon** (3–0)	Carsten (1–1)		ESPN+		18–7	
Apr. 6	at California	No. 8	Evans Diamond • Berkeley, CA	**W** 8–7	**Mathews** (4–2)	Colwell (1–3)	**Pancer** (2)	P12N	507	19–7	8–2
Apr. 7	at California	No. 8	Evans Diamond • Berkeley, CA	**W** 18–8	**Scott** (5–0)	Becerra (0–2)		P12N	764	20–7	9–2
Apr. 8	at California	No. 8	Evans Diamond • Berkeley, CA	**W** 5–3	**Bruno** (1–0)	Lozovoy (0–1)	**Pancer** (3)	P12N	1,217	21–7	10–2
Apr. 10	No. 22 Texas Tech*	No. 8	Klein Field at Sunken Diamond • Stanford, CA	**W** 6–4	**Meier** (2–0)	Devine (1–3)	**Bruno** (3)	P12N	2,062	22–7	
Apr. 11	No. 21 Texas Tech*	No. 8	Klein Field at Sunken Diamond • Stanford, CA	**L** 6–4	Beckel (4–0)	**Montgomery** (1–1)		P12 Insider	1,406	22–8	
Apr. 14	at Oregon	No. 8	PK Park • Eugene, OR	**L** 0–4	Stoffal (5–2)	**Methews** (4–3)		Oregon Live Stream	2,506	22–9	10–3
Apr. 15	at Oregon	No. 8	PK Park • Eugene, OR	**L** 1–8	Mercado (3–0)	**Scott** (5–1)		Oregon Live Stream	2,322	22–10	10–4
Apr. 16	at Oregon	No. 8	PK Park • Eugene, OR	**W** 6–4	**Dowd** (4–2)	Dallas (4–1)		Oregon Live Stream	1,351	23–10	11–4
Apr. 18	Sacramento State*	No. 9	Klein Field at Sunken Diamond • Stanford, CA	**L** 13–15	Tucker (1–0)	**Montgomery** (1–2)	Zalasky (8)	Stanford Live Stream	1,129	23–11	
Apr. 21	Washington	No. 9	Klein Field at Sunken Diamond • Stanford, CA	**W** 3–1^{16}	**Pancer** (1–0)	McAdams (1–2)		Stanford Live Stream	1,832	24–11	12–4
Apr. 22	Washington	No. 9	Klein Field at Sunken Diamond • Stanford, CA	**L** 0–9	Lord (4–3)	**Scott** (5–2)		Stanford Live Stream	1,643	24–12	12–5
Apr. 23	Washington	No. 9	Klein Field at Sunken Diamond • Stanford, CA	**W** 8–6	**Dowd** (5–2)	Emanuels (2–2)	**Pancer** (4)	Stanford Live Stream-2	1,960	25–12	13–5
Apr. 25	California*	No. 8	Klein Field at Sunken Diamond • Stanford, CA	**W** 6–5	**O'Harran** (1–1)	Aivazian (0–3)		Stanford Live Stream	1,410	26–12	
Apr. 28	UCLA	No. 8	Klein Field at Sunken Diamond • Stanford, CA	**W** 6–5	**Mathews** (5–3)	Brooks (5–4)	**Bruno** (4)	ESPNU	2,146	27–12	14–5
Apr. 29	UCLA	No. 8	Klein Field at Sunken Diamond • Stanford, CA	**L** 6–9	Austin (4–2)	**Scott** (5–3)		Stanford Live Stream	2,126	27–13	14–6
Apr. 30	UCLA	No. 8	Klein Field at Sunken Diamond • Stanford, CA	**W** 10–7	**Bruno** (2–0)	Delvecchio (1–3)		Stanford Live Stream	2,593	28–13	15–6

May (9–1)

Date	Opponent	Rank	Site/stadium	Score	Win	Loss	Save	TV	Attendance	Overall record	Pac12 record
May 5	at No. 20 Arizona State	No. 7	Phoenix Municipal Stadium • Tempe, AZ	**W** 8–6	**Mathews** (6–3)	Pivaroff (2–2)	**Bruno** (5)	P12 Insider	3,382	29–13	16–6
May 6	at No. 20 Arizona State	No. 7	Phoenix Municipal Stadium • Tempe, AZ	**W** 12–11	**Dowd** (6–2)	Stevenson (4–2)	**Bruno** (6)	P12 Insider	3,453	30–13	17–6
May 7	at No. 20 Arizona State	No. 7	Phoenix Municipal Stadium • Tempe, AZ	**W** 9–4	**Dixon** (4–0)	Dunn (4–4)	**Pancer** (5)	P12 Insider	2,990	31–13	18–6
May 9	at Santa Clara	No. 4	Stephen Schott Stadium • Santa Clara, CA	**W** 20–17	**Dowd** (7–2)	Gomez (4–3)		WCC Network	730	32–13	
May 12	Arizona	No. 4	Klein Field at Sunken Diamond • Stanford, CA	**W** 9–8	**Dowd** (8–2)	Long (2–5)		P12N	2,744	33–13	19–6
May 13	Arizona	No. 4	Klein Field at Sunken Diamond • Stanford, CA	**W** 9–2	**Dixon** (5–0)	Zastrow (4–5)		P12N	2,061	34–13	20–6
May 14	Arizona	No. 4	Klein Field at Sunken Diamond • Stanford, CA	**L** 20–21^{10}	Barraza (4–2)	**Bruno** (2–1)		P12N	1,896	34–14	20–7
May 18	at Washington State	No. 3	Bailey–Brayton Field • Pullman, WA	**W** 7–6^{10}	**Dowd** (9–2 )	Kaelber (4–4)	**Bruno** (7)	P12 Washington	1,183	35–14	21–7
May 19	at Washington State	No. 3	Bailey–Brayton Field • Pullman, WA	**W** 7–4	**Mathews** (7–3)	Spencer (2–3)	**Bruno** (8)	P12 Bay Area	1,078	36–14	22–7
May 20	at Washington State	No. 3	Bailey–Brayton Field • Pullman, WA	**W** 15–5	**Dixon** (6–0)	Kaelber (4–5)		P12 Bay Area	1,365	37–14	23–7

Postseason
Pac-12 Baseball Tournament (1–2)

Date	Opponent (Seed)	Rank (Seed)	Site/stadium	Score	Win	Loss	Save	TV	Attendance	Overall record	Tournament record
May 24	California (9)	No. 3 (1)	Scottsdale Stadium • Scottsdale, AZ	**W** 18–10	**Pancer** (2–0)	Aivazian (0–4)		Pac-12 Network	2,012	38–14	1–0
May 25	Oregon (6)	No. 3 (1)	Scottsdale Stadium • Scottsdale, AZ	**L** 6–8	Mollerus (2–2)	**Pancer** (2–1)		Pac-12 Network		38–15	1–1
May 26	Arizona (8)	No. 3 (1)	Scottsdale Stadium • Scottsdale, AZ	**L** 4–14	Zastrow (6–5)	**Mathews** (7–4)		Pac-12 Network	2,563	38–16	1–2

Stanford Regional (4-1)

Date	Opponent (Seed)	Rank (Seed)	Site/stadium	Score	Win	Loss	Save	TV	Attendance	Overall record	Tournament record
Jun. 2	San Jose State (4)	No. 6 (1)	Klein Field at Sunken Diamond • Stanford, CA	**W** 13–2	**Mathews** (8–4)	Clark (4–5)		ESPN+	2,675	39-16	1-0
Jun. 3	No. 25 Texas A&M (2)	No. 6 (1)	Klein Field at Sunken Diamond • Stanford, CA	**L** 5–8	Garcia (3–3)	**Dowd** (9–3)	Wansing (2)	ESPN+	2,808	39–17	1–1
Jun. 4	Cal State Fullerton (3)	No. 6 (1)	Klein Field at Sunken Diamond • Stanford, CA	**W** 6–5	**Dugan** (1–0)	Hinkel (1–5)	**Bruno** (9)	ESPN+	1,853	40–17	2–1
Jun. 4	No. 25 Texas A&M (2)	No. 6 (1)	Klein Field at Sunken Diamond • Stanford, CA	**W** 13–5	**Pancer** (3–1)	Wansing (3–4)	**Dugan** (1)	ESPN2/+	2,789	41–17	3–1
Jun. 5	No. 25 Texas A&M (2)	No. 6 (1)	Klein Field at Sunken Diamond • Stanford, CA	**W** 7–1	**Mathews** (9–4)	Dettmer (1–4)		ESPN2/+	2,889	42–17	4–1

Stanford Super Regional (2-1)

Date	Opponent (Seed)	Rank (Seed)	Site/stadium	Score	Win	Loss	Save	TV	Attendance	Overall record	Tournament record
Jun. 10	Texas	No. 6	Klein Field at Sunken Diamond • Stanford, CA	**L** 5–7	Whitehead (4–0)	**Scott** (5–4)	Morehouse (7)	ESPN2	2,975	42-18	0–1
Jun. 11	Texas	No. 6	Klein Field at Sunken Diamond • Stanford, CA	**W** 8–3	**Mathews** (10–4)	Johnson (8–4)		ESPN2	2,904	43–18	1–1
Jun. 12	Texas	No. 6	Klein Field at Sunken Diamond • Stanford, CA	**W** 7–6	**Dixon** (7–0)	Gordon (7–2)		ESPN	2,995	44–18	2–1

College World series (0-2)

Date	Opponent (Seed)	Rank (Seed)	Site/stadium	Score	Win	Loss	Save	TV	Attendance	Overall record	Tournament record
Jun. 17	No. 1 Wake Forest	No. 6	Charles Schwab Field • Omaha, NE	**L** 2–3	Keener (8–1)	**Bruno** (2–2)	Minacci (13)	ESPN	23,943	44-19	0-1
Jun. 19	No. 21 Tennessee	No. 6	Charles Schwab Field • Omaha, NE	**L** 4–6	Burns (5–3)	**Scott** (5–5)		ESPN	23,886	44-20	0-2

Source: Rankings are based on the team's current ranking in the D1Baseball poll. Parentheses indicate tournament seedings.

== Stanford Super Regional ==
Stanford Regional Teams
(1) No. 6 Stanford Cardinal	(2) Texas A&M Aggies	(3) Cal State Fullerton Titans	(4) San Jose State Spartans

Regional	Regional
1	Stanford	13
4	San Jose State	2
1	Stanford	5
2	Texas A&M	8
3	Cal State Fullerton	7
2	Texas A&M	12
Stanford Regional – Sunken Diamond
4	San Jose State	5
3	Cal State Fullerton	9
3	Cal State Fullerton	5
1	Stanford	6
1	Miami (FL)	9
4	Maine	1
1	Miami (FL)	1
2	Texas	4
3	Louisiana	2
2	Texas	4
Coral Gables Regional – Alex Rodriguez Park at Mark Light Field
4	Maine	10
3	Louisiana	19
3	Louisiana	5
1	Miami (FL)	8

Regional Final
2	Texas A&M	5	1
1	Stanford	13	7
2	Texas	10	–
1	Miami (FL)	6	–

Super Regional; June 10–12
8	Stanford	5	8	7
Texas	7	3	6

== College World Series ==
2023 College World Series Teams
TCU Horned Frogs	Oral Roberts Golden Eagles	(7) Virginia Cavaliers	(2) Florida Gators	(1) Wake Forest Demon Deacons	(8) Stanford Cardinal	(5) LSU Tigers	Tennessee Volunteers

First round	Second round
TCU	5
Oral Roberts	6
Oral Roberts	4
2	Florida	5
7	Virginia	5
2	Florida	6
Bracket 1
TCU	4
7	Virginia	3
TCU	6
Oral Roberts	1
1	Wake Forest	3
8	Stanford	2
1	Wake Forest	3
5	LSU	2
5	LSU	6
Tennessee	3
Bracket 2
8	Stanford	4
Tennessee	6
Tennessee	0
5	LSU	5

Semifinals
2	Florida	3	–
TCU	2	–
1	Wake Forest	2	0
5	LSU	5	2^{11}

Finals
2	Florida	3	24	4
5	LSU	4^{11}	4	18

== Awards and honors ==
Conference honors
Honors	Player	Position	Ref.
Pac-12 Coach of the Year	David Esquer	Coach	
Pac-12 Pitcher of the Year	Quinn Mathews	P	
Pac-12 Player of the Year	Alberto Rios	C/OF	
Pac-12 Freshman of the Year	Malcolm Moore	C/1B	
Pac-12 Batting Champion	Tommy Troy	3B	
Pac-12 All Conference Team	Ryan Bruno	P	
Pac-12 All Conference Team	Carter Graham	DH/INF	
Pac-12 All Conference Team	Quinn Mathews	P	
Pac-12 All Conference Team	Brandon Montgomery	OF/P	
Pac-12 All Conference Team	Albertto Rios	OF/C	
Pac-12 All Conference Team	Tommy Troy	3B	
Pac-12 All-Defensive Team	Carter Graham	INF	
Pac-12 All-Defensive Team	Tommy Troy	3B	

Weekly honors
Honors	Player	Position	Date Awarded	Ref.
Pac-12 Baseball Player of the Week	Matt Scott	P	March 27, 2023	
Pac-12 Baseball Player of the Week	Alberto Rios	C/OF	May 1, 2023	
Pac-12 Baseball Player of the Week	Alberto Rios	C/OF	May 8, 2023	

== Rankings ==
Ranking movements Legend: ██ Increase in ranking ██ Decrease in ranking т = Tied with team above or below
	Week																		
Poll	Pre	1	2	3	4	5	6	7	8	9	10	11	12	13	14	15	16	17	Final
Coaches'	3	3*	4	3	9	9	7	9	8	9	8	6	6	5	5	6т	5	5	5
Baseball America	4	3	3	3	10	8	6	7	7	11	9	5	5	4	4	6	6	6	6
Collegiate Baseball^	3	3	7	5	19	14	11	10	9	11	11	4	4	3	2	6	4	4	8
NCBWA†	3	2	4	3	10	10	8	8	8	10	7	4	4	5	3т	7	4	8	8
D1Baseball	3	2	2	2	9	9	7	8	8	9	8	4	4	3	3	6	4	4	4

^ Collegiate Baseball ranked 40 teams in their preseason poll, but only ranked 30 teams weekly during the season.
† NCBWA ranks 30 teams in their preseason poll, but only ranks 25 teams weekly during the season.
* A new poll was not released for this week, so for comparison purposes, the previous week's ranking is inserted in this week's slot.
