= 2023 Oklahoma State Cowboys baseball team =

College Baseball Season

2023 Oklahoma State Cowboys baseball

Big 12 Regular season champions

Stillwater Regional, 0–2
- Conference: Big 12 Conference

Ranking
- Coaches: No. 13
- CB: No. 14
- Record: 41–20 (15–9 Big 12)
- Head coach: Josh Holliday (11th season)
- Assistant coaches: Rob Walton (11th season); Robin Ventura (1st season); Justin Seely (6th season)
- Home stadium: O'Brate Stadium

2023 Big 12 Conference baseball standings
	Conf.				Overall
Team	W		L	PCT	W		L	PCT
No. 14 Texas ‍†‍‍^{y}	15	–	9	.625	42	–	22	.656
Oklahoma State ‍†‍‍^{y}	15	–	9	.625	41	–	20	.672
West Virginia ‍†‍‍^{y}	15	–	9	.625	40	–	20	.667
No. 5 TCU ‍‍‡‍^{y}	13	–	11	.542	44	–	24	.647
Kansas State ‍‍‍	13	–	11	.542	35	–	24	.593
Texas Tech ‍‍‍^{y}	12	–	12	.500	41	–	23	.641
Oklahoma ‍‍‍^{y}	11	–	13	.458	32	–	28	.533
Kansas ‍‍‍	8	–	16	.333	25	–	32	.439
Baylor ‍‍‍	6	–	18	.250	20	–	35	.364
† – Conference champion ‡ – Tournament champion y – Invited to the NCAA tournament As of June 25, 2023; Rankings from D1baseball

The 2023 Oklahoma State Cowboys baseball team represented Oklahoma State University during the 2023 NCAA Division I baseball season. The Cowboys played their home games at O'Brate Stadium as a member of the Big 12 Conference. They were led by head coach Josh Holliday, in his eleventh season at Oklahoma State.

== Previous season ==
The 2022 team finished the season with a 42–22 record and a 15–9 record in the Big 12. In the 2022 Big 12 Conference baseball tournament, the fourth-seeded Cowboys made a run to the semifinals where they fell to fifth-seeded Texas in Game 7, 2–9. They earned an at-large bid into the 2022 NCAA Division I baseball tournament, where they were seeded seventh overall and the top seed in the Stillwater Regional. There, the Cowboys were eliminated by second-seeded Arkansas.

== Preseason ==
=== Award watch lists ===
Listed in the order that they were released

Award	Player	Position	Year	Source
Big 12 Preseason Pitcher of the Year	Juaron Watts-Brown	RHP	Sophomore	
Big 12 Preseason Newcomer of the Year	Juaron Watts-Brown	RHP	Sophomore	
Golden Spikes Award watchlist	Nolan McLean	U	Junior	
Golden Spikes Award watchlist	Juaron Watts-Brown	RHP	Sophomore	

=== Big 12 media poll ===
Big 12 media poll
Predicted finish	Team	Votes (1st place)
1	TCU	61 (5)
2	Oklahoma State	59 (4)
3	Texas Tech	48
4	Texas	43
5	Oklahoma	38
6	West Virginia	28
7	Kansas State	17
8	Kansas	16
9	Baylor	14

=== Preseason Big 12 awards and honors ===
Preseason All-Big 12 Team
Player	No.	Position	Class
Marcus Brown	19	INF	Junior
Nolan McLean	13	U	Junior
Roc Riggio	7	INF	Sophomore
Juaron Watts-Brown	23	RHP	Sophomore

=== Preseason All-Americans ===
Second Team All-Americans
Player	No.	Position	Class	Selector(s)
Nolan McLean	13	U	Junior	Collegiate Baseball; D1Baseball
Juaron Watts-Brown	23	SP	Sophomore	Baseball America; D1Baseball

Third Team All-Americans
Player	No.	Position	Class	Selector(s)
Nolan McLean	13	U	Junior	Baseball America; NCBWA
Roc Riggio	7	INF	Sophomore	Baseball America; D1Baseball
Juaron Watts-Brown	23	SP	Sophomore	NCBWA

== Schedule and results ==
2023 Oklahoma State Cowboys baseball game log
Regular season (37–16)

February (5–3)
Date	Opponent	Rank	Site/stadium	Score	Win	Loss	Save	TV	Attendance	Overall record	B12 Record
State Farm College Baseball Showdown
February 17	vs. Missouri*	No. 9	Globe Life Field; Arlington, TX	**W** 5–3	**Drew Blake (1–0)**	Chandler Murphy (0–1)	**Nolan McLean (1)**	FloSports	15,721	1–0	—
February 18	vs. No. 10 Vanderbilt*	No. 9	Globe Life Field	**L** 9–11	Andrew Dutkanych IV (1–0)	**Brennan Phillips (0–1)**	Nick Maldonado (1)	FloSports	20,295	1–1	—
February 19	vs. No. 8 Arkansas*	No. 9	Globe Life Field	**L** 1–18^{7}	Hunter Hollan (1–0)	**Bayden Root (0–1)**	—	FloSports	17,567	1–2	—
February 21	Cal Baptist*	No. 15	O'Brate Stadium; Stillwater, OK	**W** 2–0	**Evan O'Toole (1–0)**	Brandon Downer (1–1)	**Nolan McLean (2)**	B12N/ESPN+	4,928	2–2	—
February 24	Loyola Marymount*	No. 15	O'Brate Stadium	**W** 1–0	**Evan O'Toole (2–0)**	Diego Barrera (0–1)	**Nolan McLean (2)**	B12N/ESPN+	4,562	3–2	—
February 25	Loyola Marymount*	No. 15	O'Brate Stadium	**L** 8–10^{10}	Merrick Baldo (2–0)	**Gabe Davis (0–1)**	—		4,562	3–3	—
February 26	Loyola Marymount*	No. 15	O'Brate Stadium	**W** 11–1^{7}	**Brennan Phillips (1–1)**	Owen Hackman (0–1)	—	B12N/ESPN+	4,326	4–3	—
February 28	at Missouri State*	No. 12	Hammons Field; Springfield, MO	**W** 12–10	**Bayden Root (1–1)**	Scott Youngbrandt (0–2)	**Nolan McLean (4)**	B12N/ESPN+	1,031	5–3	—

March (15–4)
Date	Opponent	Rank	Site/stadium	Score	Win	Loss	Save	TV	Attendance	Overall record	B12 Record
March 3	Austin Peay*	No. 12	O'Brate Stadium	**W** 19–2^{7}	**Juaron Watts-Brown (1–0)**	Nick James (1–2)	—		4,729	6–3	—
March 4	Austin Peay*	No. 12	O'Brate Stadium	**W** 2–1	**Isaac Stebens (1–0)**	Lyle Miller-Green (0–2)	**Nolan McLean (5)**		5,348	7–3	—
March 5	Austin Peay*	No. 12	O'Brate Stadium	**W** 12–4	**Bayden Root (2–1)**	Jacob Kush (0–1)	—	B12N/ESPN+	5,006	8–3	—
March 7	Arizona State*	No. 13	O'Brate Stadium	**W** 8–4	**Isaac Stebens (2–0)**	Blake Pivaroff (0–1)	—	B12N/ESPN+	4,233	9–3	—
March 8	Arizona State*	No. 13	O'Brate Stadium	**W** 7–4	**Ben Abram (1–0)**	Owen Stevenson (0–1)	**Nolan McLean (6)**	B12N/ESPN+	4,086	10–3	—
March 10	Utah Tech*	No. 13	O'Brate Stadium	**W** 11–1^{7}	**Juaron Watts-Brown (2–0)**	Brett Porthan (2–2)	—		4,312	11–3	—
March 11 (Note: Part of a doubleheader.)	Utah Tech*	No. 13	O'Brate Stadium	**W** 10–4	**Bayden Root (3–1)**	Ryan Hardman (0–4)	—		5,095	12–3	—
March 11	Utah Tech*	No. 13	O'Brate Stadium	**W** 9–3	**Brian Hendry (1–0)**	Jake Dahle (0–3)	—		5,095	13–3	—
March 12	Utah Tech*	No. 13	O'Brate Stadium	**W** 9–4	**Isaac Stebens (3–0)**	Carsten Herman (2–1)	—		4,304	14–3	—
March 14	Dallas Baptist*	No. 12	O'Brate Stadium	**W** 20–4^{7}	**Ben Abram (2–0)**	Zach Heaton (1–1)	—	B12N/ESPN+	5,167	15–3	—
March 17	at Texas Tech	No. 12	Rip Griffin Park; Lubbock, TX	**L** 7–8^{10}	Ryan Free (2–1)	**Nolan McLean (0–1)**	—	B12N/ESPN+	3,713	15–4	0–1
March 18	at Texas Tech	No. 12	Rip Griffin Park	**W** 9–4	**Ben Abram (3–0)**	Mason Molina (2–1)	—	B12N/ESPN+	4,021	16–4	1–1
March 19	at Texas Tech	No. 12	Rip Griffin Park	**L** 1–12^{7}	Brandon Beckel (3–0)	**Juaron Watts-Brown (2–1)**	—	B12N/ESPN+	3,746	16–5	1–2
March 22	at Wichita State*	No. 20	Eck Stadium; Wichita, KS	**W** 10–1	**Carson Benge (1–0)**	Cameron Bye (0–3)	—	B12N/ESPN+	1,835	17–5	—
March 24	Baylor	No. 20	O'Brate Stadium	**W** 11–9	**Nolan McLean (1–1)**	Hambleton Oliver (2–2)	—	B12N/ESPN+	4,776	18–5	2–2
March 25	Baylor	No. 20	O'Brate Stadium	**W** 15–8	**Ben Abram (4–0)**	Mason Marriott (1–3)	—	B12N/ESPN+	6,556	19–5	3–2
March 26	Baylor	No. 20	O'Brate Stadium	**W** 13–2^{7}	**Juaron Watts-Brown (3–1)**	Will Rigney (2–1)	—	B12N/ESPN+	4,736	20–5	4–2
March 28	at Dallas Baptist*	No. 17	Horner Ballpark; Dallas, TX	**L** 0–8	Zach Heaton (2–1)	**Carson Benge (1–1)**	—		1,376	20–6	—
March 31	No. 21 Texas	No. 17	O'Brate Stadium	**L** 3–5	Lucas Gordon (3–0)	**Ben Abram (4–1)**	Zane Morehouse (4)	B12N/ESPN+	5,876	20–7	4–3

April (10–6)
Date	Opponent	Rank	Site/stadium	Score	Win	Loss	Save	TV	Attendance	Overall record	B12 Record
April 1	No. 21 Texas	No. 17	O'Brate Stadium	**W** 4–1	**Juaron Watts-Brown (4–1)**	Travis Sthele (2–3)	**Isaac Stebens (1)**	B12N/ESPN+	6,489	21–7	5–3
April 2	No. 21 Texas	No. 17	O'Brate Stadium	**W** 4–3	**Isaac Stebens (4–0)**	Zane Morehouse (4–1)	—	B12N/ESPN+	5,655	22–7	6–3
April 4	Wichita State*	No. 16	O'Brate Stadium	**L** 6–13	Matt Boyer (4–0)	**Ryan Bogusz (0–1)**	—	B12N/ESPN+	5,273	22–8	—
April 6	at TCU	No. 16	Lupton Stadium; Fort Worth, TX	**W** 7–6	**Evan O'Toole (3–0)**	Chase Hoover (1–1)	**Isaac Stebens (2)**	B12N/ESPN+	3,728	23–8	7–3
April 7	at TCU	No. 16	Lupton Stadium	**L** 3–7	Kole Klecker (6–2)	**Ben Abram (4–2)**	—	ESPNU	3,996	23–9	7–4
April 8	at TCU	No. 16	Lupton Stadium	**L** 5–12	Garrett Wright (2–1)	**Evan O'Toole (3–1)**	—	B12N/ESPN+	4,385	23–10	7–5
April 11	Oral Roberts*	No. 18	O'Brate Stadium	**L** 5–8	Caleb Isaacs (5–0)	**Gabe Davis (0–2)**	Cade Denton (8)	B12N/ESPN+	4,781	23–11	—
April 14	West Virginia	No. 18	O'Brate Stadium	**L** 3–6	Ben Hampton (3–1)	**Juaron Watts-Brown (4–2)**	Carlson Reed (3)	B12N/ESPN+	5,055	23–12	7–6
April 15	West Virginia	No. 18	O'Brate Stadium	**L** 5–9	Aidan Major (2–2)	**Isaac Stebens (4–1)**	—	B12N/ESPN+	5,817	23–13	7–7
April 16	West Virginia	No. 18	O'Brate Stadium	**W** 11–6	**Brian Hendry (2–0)**	David Hagaman (0–1)	—	B12N/ESPN+	4,576	24–13	8–7
Bedlam Series
April 18 (Note: Non-conference game.)	Oklahoma*		O'Brate Stadium	**W** 19–8	**Evan O'Toole (4–1)**	Gray Harrison (0–2)	**Isaac Stebens (3)**	B12N/ESPN+	6,769	25–13	—
April 21	at Kansas		Hoglund Ballpark; Lawrence, KS	**W** 15–10	**Evan O'Toole (5–1)**	Collin Baumgartner (3–1)	—	B12N/ESPN+	682	26–13	9–7
April 22	at Kansas		Hoglund Ballpark	**W** 14–3	**Ben Abram (5–2)**	Sam Ireland (4–5)	**Gabe Davis (1)**	ESPNU	893	27–13	10–7
April 23	at Kansas		Hoglund Ballpark	**W** 8–3	**Bayden Root (4–1)**	Ethan Bradford (2–4)	—	B12N/ESPN+	964	28–13	11–7
April 25	Wichita State*		O'Brate Stadium	**Canceled due to weather conditions**							
April 28	at Michigan*		Ray Fisher Stadium; Ann Arbor, MI	**Canceled due to weather conditions**							
April 29	at Michigan*		Ray Fisher Stadium	**W** 5–3	**Bayden Root (5–1)**	Connor O'Halloran (7–3)	**Isaac Stebens (4)**	BTN	1,619	29–13	—
April 30	at Michigan*		Ray Fisher Stadium	**W** 8–5	**Ben Abram (6–2)**	Noah Rennard (6–3)	**Isaac Stebens (5)**	BTN	1,410	30–13	—

May (7–3)
Date	Opponent	Rank	Site/stadium	Score	Win	Loss	Save	TV	Attendance	Overall record	B12 Record
May 2	at Oral Roberts*		J. L. Johnson Stadium; Tulsa, OK	**L** 7–9	Jacob Widener (2–2)	**Brian Hendry (2–1)**	—		2,273	30–14	—
May 5	East Tennessee State*		O'Brate Stadium	**W** 7–4	**Juaron Watts-Brown (5–2)**	Colby Stuart (1–4)	**Isaac Stebens (6)**	B12N/ESPN+	5,007	31–14	—
May 6	East Tennessee State*		O'Brate Stadium	**W** 17–7	**Bayden Root (6–1)**	Nathanial Tate (6–4)	—	B12N/ESPN+	5,435	32–14	—
May 7	East Tennessee State*		O'Brate Stadium	**W** 20–7^{7}	**Ryan Bogusz (1–1)**	Cade Carlson (3–1)	—	B12N/ESPN+	4,620	33–14	—
May 12	Kansas State		O'Brate Stadium	**L** 9–10	Owen Boerema (7–1)	**Juaron Watts-Brown (5–3)**	Tyson Neighbors (10)	B12N/ESPN+	4,990	33–15	11–8
May 13	Kansas State		O'Brate Stadium	**W** 19–5	**Bayden Root (7–1)**	German Fajardo (3–3)	—	B12N/ESPN+	4,816	34–15	12–8
May 14	Kansas State		O'Brate Stadium	**W** 12–2^{7}	**Carson Benge (2–1)**	Mason Buss (4–3)	—	B12N/ESPN+	4,599	35–15	13–8
Bedlam Series
May 18	at Oklahoma	No. 25	L. Dale Mitchell Baseball Park; Norman, OK	**W** 13–2	**Evan O'Toole (6–1)**	Braxton Douthit (4–5)	—	ESPN+	2,571	36–15	14–8
May 19	at Oklahoma	No. 25	L. Dale Mitchell Baseball Park	**L** 0–5	Braden Carmichael (7–0)	**Juaron Watts-Brown (5–4)**	—	ESPN+	3,044	36–16	14–9
May 20	at Oklahoma	No. 25	L. Dale Mitchell Baseball Park	**W** 11–1	**Ben Abram (7–2)**	James Hitt (5–1)	—	ESPN+	3,371	37–16	15–9

Postseason (4–4)

Big 12 Tournament (4–2)
Date	Opponent	Rank	Site/stadium	Score	Win	Loss	Save	TV	Attendance	Overall record	B12T Record
May 24	vs. (7) Oklahoma	(2) No. 18	Globe Life Field	**L** 5–9	James Hitt (6–1)	**Carson Benge (2–2)**	Carter Campbell (2)	B12N/ESPN+	7,406	37–17	0–1
May 25	vs. (3) No. 21 West Virginia	(2) No. 18	Globe Life Field	**W** 3–2	**Juaron Watts-Brown (6–4)**	Carlson Reed (2–1)	—	B12N/ESPN+	6,325	38–17	1–1
May 26	vs. (7) Oklahoma	(2) No. 18	Globe Life Field	**W** 8–3	**Ben Abram (8–2)**	Will Carsten (1–3)	—	B12N/ESPN+	10,745	39–17	2–1
May 27	vs. (6) Texas Tech	(2) No. 18	Globe Life Field	**W** 8–1	**Brennan Phillips (2–1)**	Zane Petty (3–1)	Bayden Root (1)	B12N/ESPN+	—	40–17	3–1
May 27	vs. (6) Texas Tech	(2) No. 18	Globe Life Field	**W** 6–5	**Gabe Davis (1–2)**	Brandon Beckel (5–2)	—	B12N/ESPN+	13,532	41–17	4–1
May 28	vs. (4) TCU	(2) No. 18	Globe Life Field	**L** 5–12	Luke Savage (3–3)	**Ben Abram (8–3)**	—	ESPN2	14,673	41–18	4–2

Stillwater Regional (0–2)
Date	Opponent	Rank	Site/stadium	Score	Win	Loss	Save	TV	Attendance	Overall record	NCAAT record
June 2	(4) Oral Roberts	(1) No. 16	O'Brate Stadium	**L** 4–6	Caleb Isaacs (7–0)	**Nolan McLean (1–2)**	Cade Denton (13)	ESPN+	5,423	41–19	0–1
June 3	(2) No. 18 Dallas Baptist	(1) No. 16	O'Brate Stadium	**L** 4–18	Zach Heaton (5–1)	**Juaron Watts-Brown (6–5)**	—	ESPN2	5,033	41–20	0–2

Legend: = Win = Loss = Canceled
Bold = Oklahoma State team member
"*" indicates a non-conference game.
"#" represents ranking. All rankings are based on the team's current ranking in the D1Baseball poll.
"()" represents postseason seeding in the Big 12 Tournament or NCAA Regional, respectively.

== Statistics ==
=== Team batting ===
As of March 24, 2023

Team	AB	Avg.	H	2B	3B	HR	RBI	BB	SO	SB
Oklahoma State	738	.310	229	55	4	40	167	107	201	20
Opponents	704	.246	173	32	5	21	100	82	224	7

=== Team pitching ===
Team	IP	H	R	ER	BB	SO	SV	ERA
Oklahoma State	0.0	0	0	0	0	0	0	0.00
Opponents	0.0	0	0	0	0	0	0	0.00

== Rankings ==
Ranking movements Legend: ██ Increase in ranking ██ Decrease in ranking
	Week																			
Poll	Pre	1	2	3	4	5	6	7	8	9	10	11	12	13	14	15	16	17	18	Final
Coaches'	8	8*	13	14	13	15	13	13	16											
Baseball America	15	21	21	18	17	20	17	11	14											
Collegiate Baseball^	12	16	23	24	18	19	14	12	18											
NCBWA†	14	19	18	15	13	16	13	15	17											
D1Baseball	9	15	12	13	12	20	17	16	18											

^ Collegiate Baseball ranked 40 teams in their preseason poll, but only ranked 30 teams weekly during the season.
† NCBWA ranks 30 teams in their preseason poll, but only ranks 25 teams weekly during the season.
* A new poll was not released for this week, so for comparison purposes, the previous week's ranking is inserted in this week's slot.
