= 2023 Texas Longhorns baseball team =

College Baseball Season

2023 Texas Longhorns baseball

Big 12 Regular season champions NCAA Coral Gables Regional champions

NCAA Stanford Super Regional, 1–2
- Conference: Big 12 Conference

Ranking
- Coaches: No. 12
- CB: No. 11
- Record: 42–22 (15–9 Big 12)
- Head coach: David Pierce (7th season)
- Associate head coach: Philip Miller (7th season)
- Assistant coaches: Steve Rodriguez (1st season); Woody Williams (1st season); Caleb Longley (2nd season); Cameron Rupp (1st season)
- Home stadium: UFCU Disch–Falk Field

2023 Big 12 Conference baseball standings
	Conf.				Overall
Team	W		L	PCT	W		L	PCT
No. 14 Texas ‍†‍‍^{y}	15	–	9	.625	42	–	22	.656
Oklahoma State ‍†‍‍^{y}	15	–	9	.625	41	–	20	.672
West Virginia ‍†‍‍^{y}	15	–	9	.625	40	–	20	.667
No. 5 TCU ‍‍‡‍^{y}	13	–	11	.542	44	–	24	.647
Kansas State ‍‍‍	13	–	11	.542	35	–	24	.593
Texas Tech ‍‍‍^{y}	12	–	12	.500	41	–	23	.641
Oklahoma ‍‍‍^{y}	11	–	13	.458	32	–	28	.533
Kansas ‍‍‍	8	–	16	.333	25	–	32	.439
Baylor ‍‍‍	6	–	18	.250	20	–	35	.364
† – Conference champion ‡ – Tournament champion y – Invited to the NCAA tournament As of June 25, 2023; Rankings from D1baseball

The 2023 Texas Longhorns baseball team represented the University of Texas at Austin during the 2023 NCAA Division I baseball season. The Longhorns played their home games at UFCU Disch–Falk Field as a member of the Big 12 Conference. They were led by head coach David Pierce, in his 7th season at Texas.

In the last weekend of the regular season, Texas swept No. 6 West Virginia to earn a share of the 2023 Big 12 Regular season Championship. With a conference record of 15–9, Texas tied West Virginia and Oklahoma State for 1st place in the conference. Due to tiebreakers, Texas was the top seeded team in the Big 12 tournament. This is Texas Baseball's 80th Conference Championship in program history.

== Previous season ==
=== Regular season ===
Texas finished the regular season 39–17, 14–10 in Big 12 play. In non-conference play, Texas went 25-7 never being swept once. Against ranked opponents, Texas went 5–6. Over conference play, Texas won 5 series, while losing 3. Texas won series over Oklahoma, TCU, Baylor, West Virginia, and Kansas. Out of the 5 series won, Texas swept Baylor and Kansas. The 3 series that were lost were to Texas Tech, Kansas State, and Oklahoma State. Oklahoma State was the only team that swept Texas over the course of the regular season. Heading into the Big 12 tournament, Texas finished 5th in the conference regular season earning a 5-seed in the conference tournament.

=== Big 12 tournament ===
With Texas earning a 5-seed in the Big 12 tournament, they faced off against 4-seed Oklahoma State. After defeating Oklahoma State, TCU, and Oklahoma State again, Texas advanced to the championship game against Oklahoma. In the championship game, Oklahoma defeated Texas 8–1. Skyler Messinger, Douglas Hodo III, and Pete Hansen earned Big 12 All-Tournament Team honors.

Big 12 Bracket

First round May 25
1	TCU	4
8	Baylor	2
4	Oklahoma State	0
5	Texas	4
8	Baylor	1
4	Oklahoma State	11^{7}
3	Oklahoma	6
6	West Virginia	4
2	Texas Tech	5
7	Kansas State	3
6	West Virginia	5
7	Kansas State	8

Second round May 26–May 27
1	TCU	3
5	Texas	5
1	TCU	4
4	Oklahoma State	8
3	Oklahoma	6
2	Texas Tech	3
2	Texas Tech	5
7	Kansas State	6^{11}

Semifinals; May 28
5	Texas	1	9
4	Oklahoma State	8	2
3	Oklahoma	4	-
7	Kansas State	3	-

Finals; May 29
5	Texas	1
3	Oklahoma	8

=== NCAA tournament ===
==== Austin Regional ====
Due to a late push from Texas, they earned a regional host spot. In the first round of regionals, Texas faced off against Air Force. Against Air Force, Texas won 11–3 advancing them to the second round against Louisiana Tech. In the second round Texas defeated Louisiana Tech 5–2. After Air Force defeated Louisiana Tech in the losers bracket, Texas defeated Air Force 10–1 in the championship game advancing the Longhorns to Super Regionals.

==== Greenville Super Regional ====
Due to RPI rankings, Texas had to travel to Greenville, North Carolina to face ECU in the Greenville Super Regional. In the first game of the three game series, Texas lost game one 7–13. In the second round, Texas won 9–8 forcing a game three. In game three, Texas defeated ECU 11–1 sending the Longhorns to their 38th College World Series.

Regional Bracket

Regional	Regional
1	East Carolina	17
4	Coppin State	1
1	East Carolina	4
2	Virginia	2
3	Coastal Carolina	2
2	Virginia	7
Greenville Regional – Clark–LeClair Stadium
4	Coppin State	8
3	Coastal Carolina	10
3	Coastal Carolina	7
2	Virginia	6
1	Texas	11
4	Air Force	3
1	Texas	5
2	Louisiana Tech	2
3	Dallas Baptist	5
2	Louisiana Tech	12
Austin Regional – UFCU Disch–Falk Field
4	Air Force	5
3	Dallas Baptist	1
4	Air Force	9
2	Louisiana Tech	7

Regional Final
1	East Carolina	1	13
3	Coastal Carolina	9	4
1	Texas	10	–
4	Air Force	1	–

Super Regional
8	East Carolina	13	8	1
9	Texas	7	9	11

=== College World Series ===
In the first round of the College World Series, Texas matched up against Notre Dame. Against Notre Dame, Texas lost 3–7. In the elimination game, Texas faced off against Texas A&M. Texas was defeated by Texas A&M 2–10, ending their season.

CWS Bracket

First round	Second round
Notre Dame	7
9	Texas	3
Notre Dame	2
Oklahoma	6
5	Texas A&M	8
Oklahoma	13
Bracket 1
9	Texas	2
5	Texas A&M	10
5	Texas A&M	5
Notre Dame	1
2	Stanford	2
Arkansas	17
Arkansas	5
Ole Miss	13
Ole Miss	5
14	Auburn	1
Bracket 2
2	Stanford	2
14	Auburn	6
14	Auburn	1
Arkansas	11

Semifinals
Oklahoma	5	–
5	Texas A&M	1	–
Ole Miss	2	2
Arkansas	3	0

Finals
Oklahoma	3	2	–
Ole Miss	10	4	–

== Personnel ==
=== Roster ===
2023 Texas Longhorns Roster
Pitchers: 11 – Tanner Witt – Junior (6'5, 215); 13 – Lucas Gordon – Junior (6'1, 193); 24 – Chase Lummus – (redshirt) Sophomore (6'1, 205); 28 – Ace Whitehead (Note: Plays two different positions) – Sophomore (5’11, 185); 31 – DJ Burke – Junior (6'2, 215); 32 – Charlie Hurley – Junior (6'8, 218); 34 – Kobe Minchey – Freshman (6'2, 205); 36 – David Shaw – Sophomore (6'7, 205); 37 – Zane Morehouse – (redshirt) Junior (6'4, 200); 38 – Max Grubbs – Freshman (6'1, 180); 39 – Travis Sthele – (redshirt) Sophomore (6'0, 198); 41 – Cody Howard – Freshman (5’11, 198); 42 – Chris Stuart – Junior (6'0, 210); 45 – Heston Tole – Junior (6’6, 220); 47 – Sam Walbridge – (redshirt) Junior (6'5, 210); 48 – Cameron O’Banan – Sophomore (6'2, 185); 53 – Luke Harrison – Sophomore (6'2, 175); 57 – Lebarron Johnson Jr. – (redshirt) Sophomore (6'4, 207); 58 – Pierce George – Freshman (6'6, 215); 88 – Andre Duplantier II – (redshirt) Sophomore (6'2, 215)	Catchers: 6 – Rylan Galvan – Freshman (6'0, 185); 10 – Kimble Schuessler – Junior (6'2, 205); 29 – Cam Constantine – (redshirt) Sophomore (6'0, 200); 35 – Garret Guillemette – Junior (6'1, 210); 40 – Preston Hoffart – (redshirt) Junior (5’11, 190); 50 – Grant Fahrlander – Freshman (5’11, 200); Infielders: 0 – Jayden Duplantier – Freshman (6’1, 180); 1 – Jalin Flores – Freshman (6’2, 185); 5 – Tanner Carlson – Senior (6’1, 190); 8 – Dylan Campbell – Junior (5’11, 205); 9 – Jared Thomas – Freshman (6’2, 175); 14 – Cade O’Hara – Freshman (6’1, 175); 19 – Mitchell Daly – Junior (6'1, 185); 27 – Jack O’Dowd – Junior (6'2, 195)	Outfielders: 4 – Porter Brown – Junior (5'11, 190); 8 – Dylan Campbell – Junior (5’11, 205); 9 – Jared Thomas – Freshman (6’2, 175); 12 – Max Belyeu – Freshman (6’2, 195); 28 – Ace Whitehead – Sophomore (5’11, 185); 29 – Cam Constantine – (redshirt) Sophomore (6'0, 200); 30 – Eric Kennedy – (redshirt) Senior (5'11, 203); Utility Players: 15 – Peyton Powell – (redshirt) Junior (6'1, 188); Legend: (S) Suspended; (I) Ineligible; Injured; Redshirt

Roster Notes

=== Starters ===
Lineup
Pos.	No.	Player.	Year
C			
1B			
2B			
3B			
SS			
LF			
CF			
RF			
DH			

Weekend pitching rotation
Day	No.	Player.	Year
Friday			
Saturday			
Sunday			

=== Coaches ===
2023 Texas Longhorns coaching staff
- David Pierce – Head coach – 7th year
- Steve Rodriguez – Assistant coach (hitting) – 1st year
- Woody Williams – Assistant coach (pitching) – 1st year
- Caleb Longley – Assistant coach – 2nd year
- Cameron Rupp – Student assistant coach – 1st year

=== Support staff ===
2023 Texas Longhorns support staff
- Philip Miller – Special assistant to the head coach – 7th year
- Chris Gordon – Coordinator of hitting and pitching development – 1st year
- Carli Todd – Director of player development – 8th year
- Heather Vacek – Director of operations – 2nd year
- Matt Couch – Assistant coach for athletic performance – 4th year
- Tom Mendez – Assistant athletic trainer – 4th year
- Chris Quinn – Equipment manager – 2nd year

== Offseason ==
=== Departures ===
All Offseason Departures
Name	Number	Pos.	Height	Weight	Year	Hometown	Notes
Tristan Stevens	35	P	6’2”	200 lbs	(redshirt) Senior	Springfield, MO	Graduated
Austin Todd	44	OF	6’1”	195 lbs	(redshirt) Senior	Round Rock, TX	Graduated
Coy Cobb	45	P	6’4”	193 lbs	(redshirt) Junior	Katy, TX	Graduated
Marcus Olivarez	46	P	6’3”	200 lbs	Senior	Columbus, TX	Graduated
Trey Faltine	0	SS	6’2”	198 lbs	(redshirt) Sophomore	Richmond, TX	MLB Draft
Silas Ardoin	4	C	6’0”	215 lbs	(redshirt) Sophomore	Moss Bluff, LA	MLB Draft
Skyler Messinger	5	IF	6’3”	220 lbs	(redshirt) Senior	Niwot, CO	MLB Draft
Douglas Hodo III	7	OF	6’0”	185 lbs	(redshirt) Sophomore	Boerne, TX	MLB Draft
Murphy Stehly	14	IF	5’10”	205 lbs	(redshirt) Senior	Carlsbad, CA	MLB Draft
Ivan Melendez	17	1B	6’3”	225 lbs	(redshirt) Junior	El Paso, TX	MLB Draft
Pete Hansen	33	P	6’2”	205 lbs	(redshirt) Sophomore	El Dorado Hills, CA	MLB Draft

==== Outgoing transfers ====
Outgoing transfers
Name	No.	Pos.	Height	Weight	Hometown	Year	New school	Source
Aaron Nixon	41	P	6’1”	205	McAllen, TX	Sophomore	Mississippi State	
Caden Noah	38	P	5’10”	190	Longview, TX	Sophomore	UT Arlington	
Cameron Dayton	54	IF/P	6’3”	207	Round Rock, TX	Junior	Seattle	
Carson McKinney	58	P	6’4”	225	Birmingham, AL	Freshman	Kansas	
Daniel Blair	36	P	6’3”	205	Peachtree City, GA	(redshirt) Junior	Ohio State	
Gavin Kash	6	IF	6’3”	198	Sour Lake, TX	Freshman	Texas Tech	
Jace Hutchins	31	P	6’5”	220	College Station, TX	(redshirt) Sophomore	Texas A&M	
Jack Arthur	42	OF/P	6’1”	195	Flower Mound, TX	Freshman	Weatherford	
Joshua Stewart	34	P	6’2”	185	Georgetown, TX	Freshman	Texas A&M	
Justin Eckhardt	56	P	6’2”	205	Sealy, TX	(redshirt) Sophomore	Ohio State	

==== 2022 MLB draft ====
Round	Pick	Overall pick	Player	Position	MLB team	Source
2nd	4th	43rd	Ivan Melendez	1B	Arizona Diamondbacks	
3rd	17th	97th	Pete Hansen	P	St. Louis Cardinals	
4th	1st	107th	Silas Ardoin	C	Baltimore Orioles	
6th	1st	167th	Douglas Hodo III	OF	Baltimore Orioles	
7th	17th	213th	Trey Faltine	SS	Cincinnati Reds	
10th	5th	291st	Murphy Stehly	3B	Washington Nationals	
12th	12th	358th	Jared Southard	P	Los Angeles Angels	
19th	10th	566th	Skyler Messinger	3B	Colorado Rockies	

==== Undrafted free agents ====
Player	Position	MLB team	Source
Tristan Stevens	P	Miami Marlins	
Marcus Olivarez	P	Kansas City Royals	

==== Coaching staff departures ====
Name	Position	New Team	New Position	Source
Sean Allen	Assistant Coach	Ohio State	Assistant Coach	
Troy Tulowitzki	Assistant Coach	(Note: Troy Tulowitzki stepped away from coaching for the 2023 season.)		

Coaching Staff Notes

=== Acquisitions ===
==== Incoming transfers ====
Incoming transfers
Name	B/T	Pos.	Height	Weight	Hometown	Year	Previous school	Source
Brandon Fields	R/R	OF	6’0”	209	Orlando, FL	Junior	State College of Florida	
Charlie Hurley	L/R	P	6’8”	218	Sacramento, CA	Junior	USC	
Chris Stuart	L/L	P	6’0”	210	Amsterdam, NL	Junior	San Jacinto	
Cody Howard	R/R	P	5’11”	198	The Woodlands, TX	Freshman	Baylor	
David Shaw	R/L	P	6’7”	205	Houston, TX	Sophomore	Rice	
DJ Burke	R/R	P	6’2”	210	San Antonio, TX	Junior	San Jacinto	
Garret Guillemette	R/R	C	6’1”	210	Yorba Linda, CA	Junior	USC	
Heston Tole	R/R	P	6’6”	220	Wichita Falls, TX	Junior	Arkansas	
Porter Brown	L/L	OF	5’11”	190	San Antonio, TX	Junior	TCU	
Tanner Carlson	R/R	IF	6’1”	190	Elk Grove, CA	Senior	Long Beach State	

==== Incoming recruits ====
2022 Texas Recruits
Name	B/T	Pos.	Height	Weight	Hometown	High School	Source
Cade O’Hara	R/R	IF/P	6’1”	180 lbs	Tustin, CA	Mater Dei	
Collin Valentine	L/L	P	6’3”	165 lbs	Dallas, TX	Highland Park	
Grant Fahrlander	R/R	C	5’11”	200 lbs	Austin, TX	St. Michael's	
Jalin Flores	R/R	SS	6’3”	188 lbs	Helotes, TX	Brandeis	
Jared Thomas	L/L	1B	6’2”	175 lbs	Waxahachie, TX	Waxahachie	
Jayden Duplantier	R/R	SS	6’1”	170 lbs	Houston, TX	Summer Creek	
Kobe Minchey	R/R	P	6’3”	205 lbs	Jarrell, TX	Homeschool	
Matthew Porchas	R/R	P	6’3”	215 lbs	Ladera Ranch, CA	Santa Margarita	
Max Belyeu	L/R	OF	6’2”	195 lbs	Aledo, TX	Aledo	
Max Grubbs	R/R	P	6’2”	180 lbs	Arlington, TX	Martin	
Pierce George	R/R	SS	6’7”	242 lbs	Lakeway, TX	Lake Travis	
Rylan Galvan	R/R	C	5’11”	175 lbs	Sinton, TX	Sinton	

=== Coaching staff additions ===
Name	Position	Previous Team	Previous Position	Source
Steve Rodriguez	Assistant Coach	Baylor	Head Coach	
Woody Williams	Assistant Coach	San Jacinto	Assistant Coach	
Cameron Rupp	Student Assistant Coach	(Note: This will be former Texas catcher Cameron Rupp’s first year as a collegiate coach.)		
Chris Gordon	Coordinator of Hitting and Pitching Development	Duke	Assistant Coach	

== Preseason ==
=== Big 12 media poll ===
Big 12 media poll
Predicted finish	Team	Votes (1st place)
1	TCU	61 (5)
2	Oklahoma State	59 (4)
3	Texas Tech	48
4	Texas	43
5	Oklahoma	38
6	West Virginia	28
7	Kansas State	17
8	Kansas	16
9	Baylor	14

=== Preseason Big 12 awards and honors ===
Preseason All-Big 12 Team
Player	No.	Position	Class
Lucas Gordon	13	P	Junior
Tanner Witt	11	P	Redshirt Sophomore

== Schedule and results ==
2023 Texas Longhorns baseball game log (42–22)
Legend: = Win = Loss = Canceled Bold = Texas team member
Regular season (38–18)

February (3–5)
Date	Time (CT)	TV	Opponent	Rank	Stadium	Score	Win	Loss	Save	Attendance	Overall record	Big 12 Record	Box Score	Recap
State Farm College Baseball Showdown
February 17	7:00 p.m.	FloBaseball.TV	vs. No. 8 Arkansas* (Note: Neutral site, Texas is the designated home team)	—	Globe Life Field • Arlington, TX	**L** 2–3	Adcock (1–0)	**Johnson Jr.** **(0–1)**	Tygart (1)	15,721	0–1	—	Box Score	Recap
February 18	3:00 p.m.	FloBaseball.TV	vs. Missouri* (Note: Neutral site, Texas is the designated visiting team)	—	Globe Life Field • Arlington, TX	**L** 5–6	Maltrud (1–0)	**Walbridge** **(0–1)**	—	20,295	0–2	—	Box Score	Recap
February 19	10:30 a.m.	FloBaseball.TV	vs. No. 10 Vanderbilt*	—	Globe Life Field • Arlington, TX	**L** 2–12	Futrell (1–0)	**Sthele** **(0–1)**	Cunningham (1)	16,100	0–3	—	Box Score	Recap
February 21	5:00 p.m.	LHN	Texas A&M–Corpus Christi*	—	UFCU Disch–Falk Field • Austin, TX	**W** 12–2	**Johnson Jr.** **(1–1)**	Garcia (0–1)	—	6,388	1–3	—	Box Score	Recap
February 24	6:30 p.m.	LHN	Indiana*	—	UFCU Disch–Falk Field • Austin, TX	**W** 4–2	**Stuart** **(1–0)**	Levy (0–1)	—	6,573	2–3	—	Box Score	Recap
February 25	1:00 p.m.	LHN	Indiana*	—	UFCU Disch–Falk Field • Austin, TX	**W** 5–2	**Morehouse** **(1–0)**	Kraft (0–1)	**Burke** **(1)**	6,851	3–3	—	Box Score	Recap
February 26	12:00 p.m.	LHN	Indiana*	—	UFCU Disch–Falk Field • Austin, TX	**L** 2–4	Sinnard (2–0)	**Sthele** **(0–2)**	Kraft (1)	6,748	3–4	—	Box Score	Recap
February 28	6:30 p.m.	LHN	No. 1 LSU*	—	UFCU Disch–Falk Field • Austin, TX	**L** 0–3	Ackenhausen (1–0)	**Stuart** **(1–1)**	Little (1)	7,641	3–5	—	Box Score	Recap

March (17–2)
Date	Time (CT)	TV	Opponent	Rank	Stadium	Score	Win	Loss	Save	Attendance	Overall record	Big 12 Record	Box Score	Recap
March 3	8:00 p.m.	ESPN+	at Cal State Fullerton*	—	Goodwin Field • Fullerton, CA	**L** 5–6	Flynn (2–0)	**Shaw** **(0–1)**	—	1,364	3–6	—	Box Score	Recap
March 4	7:00 p.m.	ESPN+	at Cal State Fullerton*	—	Goodwin Field • Fullerton, CA	**W** 4–2	**Morehouse** **(2–0)**	Hinkel (0–2)	**Hurley** **(1)**	1,708	4–6	—	Box Score	Recap
March 5	3:00 p.m.	ESPN+	at Cal State Fullerton*	—	Goodwin Field • Fullerton, CA	**L** 4–5^{(11)}	Tomczak (1–0)	**Lummus** **(0–1)**	—	1,448	4–7	—	Box Score	Recap
March 7	6:30 p.m.	LHN	Sam Houston*	—	UFCU Disch–Falk Field • Austin, TX	**W** 7–5	**Johnson Jr.** **(2–1)**	Shubert (0–2)	**Hurley** **(2)**	6,527	5–7	—	Box Score	Recap
March 8	6:30 p.m.	LHN	Mercer*	—	UFCU Disch–Falk Field • Austin, TX	**W** 11–3	**Whitehead** **(1–0)**	Thomas (0–1)	—	6,441	6–7	—	Box Score	Recap
March 10	6:30 p.m.	LHN	Manhattan*	—	UFCU Disch–Falk Field • Austin, TX	**W** 8–1	**Gordon** **(1–0)**	Hesslink (0–4)	—	6,471	7–7	—	Box Score	Recap
March 11	1:00 p.m.	LHN	Manhattan*	—	UFCU Disch–Falk Field • Austin, TX	**W** 10–4	**Grubbs** **(1–0)**	Fagler (1–3)	**Tole** **(1)**	6,548	8–7	—	Box Score	Recap
March 12	12:00 p.m.	LHN	Manhattan*	—	UFCU Disch–Falk Field • Austin, TX	**W** 16–6	**Sthele** **(1–2)**	O'Neill (0–3)	—	6,752	9–7	—	Box Score	Recap
March 14	6:30 p.m.	LHN	North Dakota State*	—	UFCU Disch–Falk Field • Austin, TX	**W** 7–2	**Hurley** **(1–0)**	Jacobs (0–3)	—	6,457	10–7	—	Box Score	Recap
March 15	6:30 p.m.	LHN	North Dakota State*	—	UFCU Disch–Falk Field • Austin, TX	**W** 7–4	**Howard** **(1–0)**	Danielson (0–3)	**Morehouse** **(1)**	6,522	11–7	—	Box Score	Recap
March 17	6:30 p.m.	LHN	New Orleans*	—	UFCU Disch–Falk Field • Austin, TX	**W** 3–1	**Gordon** **(2–0)**	LeBlanc (2–2)	**Morehouse** **(2)**	6,290	12–7	—	Box Score	Recap
March 18	2:30 p.m.	LHN	New Orleans*	—	UFCU Disch–Falk Field • Austin, TX	**W** 15–1	**Sthele** **(2–2)**	Mitchell (3–2)	—	6,520	13–7	—	Box Score	Recap
March 19	1:00 p.m.	LHN	New Orleans*	—	UFCU Disch–Falk Field • Austin, TX	**W** 9–3	**Shaw** **(1–1)**	Horton (2–2)	—	6,347	14–7	—	Box Score	Recap
March 21	6:30 p.m.	LHN	Incarnate Word*	—	UFCU Disch–Falk Field • Austin, TX	**W** 17–11	**Hurley** **(2–0)**	Higdon (0–2)	—	6,182	15–7	—	Box Score	Recap
March 24	7:00 p.m.	LHN	No. 14 Texas Tech	—	UFCU Disch–Falk Field • Austin, TX	**W** 6–2	**Morehouse** **(3–0)**	Free (2–2)	—	6,654	16–7	1–0	Box Score	Recap
March 25	2:30 p.m.	LHN	No. 14 Texas Tech	—	UFCU Disch–Falk Field • Austin, TX	**W** 6–5	**Morehouse** **(4–0)**	Devine (1–2)	—	7,123	17–7	2–0	Box Score	Recap
March 26	2:30 p.m.	LHN	No. 14 Texas Tech	—	UFCU Disch–Falk Field • Austin, TX	**W** 9–8	**Whitehead** **(2–0)**	Lysik (0–1)	—	6,744	18–7	3–0	Box Score	Recap
March 28	6:00 p.m.	SECN	at Texas A&M* (Lone Star Showdown)	No. 21	Olsen Field • College Station, TX	**W** 5–2	**Johnson Jr.** **(3–1)**	Sdao (0–1)	**Morehouse** **(3)**	7,347	19–7	—	Box Score	Recap
March 31	6:00 p.m.	ESPN+	at No. 17 Oklahoma State	No. 21	O'Brate Stadium • Stillwater, OK	**W** 5–3	**Gordon** **(3–0)**	Abram (4–1)	**Morehouse** **(4)**	5,876	20–7	4–0	Box Score	Recap

April (10–8)
Date	Time (CT)	TV	Opponent	Rank	Stadium	Score	Win	Loss	Save	Attendance	Overall record	Big 12 Record	Box Score	Recap
April 1	6:00 p.m.	ESPN+	at No. 17 Oklahoma State	No. 21	O'Brate Stadium • Stillwater, OK	**L** 1–4	Watts-Brown (4–1)	**Sthele** **(2–3)**	Stebens (1)	6,489	20–8	4–1	Box Score	Recap
April 2	1:00 p.m.	ESPN+	at No. 17 Oklahoma State	No. 21	O'Brate Stadium • Stillwater, OK	**L** 3–4	Stebens (4–0)	**Morehouse** **(4–1)**	—	5,655	20–9	4–2	Box Score	Recap
April 4	4:00 p.m.	LHN	Air Force*	No. 21	UFCU Disch–Falk Field • Austin, TX	**W** 7–1	**Whitehead** **(3–0)**	Benge (2–3)	—	6,416	21–9	—	Box Score	Recap
April 6	6:30 p.m.	LHN	Kansas State	No. 21	UFCU Disch–Falk Field • Austin, TX	Postponed to Sunday, April 9th, due to rain.								
April 7	7:00 p.m. (Note: Originally scheduled for 6:30 p.m. but start was delayed to 7:00 p.m. due to rain in the area)	LHN	Kansas State	No. 21	UFCU Disch–Falk Field • Austin, TX	**W** 6–5	**Lummus** **(1–1)**	Ruhl (1–3)	**Morehouse** **(5)**	6,455	22–9	5–2	Box Score	Recap
April 8	2:30 p.m. (Note: Originally scheduled for 12:00 p.m. but rescheduled to 2:30 p.m. due to potential weather)	LHN	Kansas State	No. 21	UFCU Disch–Falk Field • Austin, TX	**L** 5–6	Heyne (2–0)	**Johnson Jr.** **(3–2)**	Neighbors (5)	7,328	22–10	5–3	Box Score	Recap
April 9 (Note: Originally scheduled for April 6th, but postponed to April 9th due to rain.)	1:00 p.m.	LHN	Kansas State	No. 21	UFCU Disch–Falk Field • Austin, TX	**W** 8–2	**Hurley** **(3–0)**	Wentworth (1–3)	—	6,573	23–10	6–3	Box Score	Recap
April 10	6:00 p.m.	ESPN+	at Texas State*	No. 19	Bobcat Ballpark • San Marcos, TX	**W** 5–2	**Minchey** **(1–0)**	Zabel (0–1)	—	3,425 (Note: New attendance record for Texas State's Bobcat Ballpark, This number does not include the people standing outside the stadium and watching from the bleachers of the adjacent softball stadium)	24–10	—	Box Score	Recap
April 11	6:30 p.m.	LHN	Texas State*	No. 19	UFCU Disch–Falk Field • Austin, TX	**L** 3–9	Bush (1–1)	**O'Banan** **(0–1)**	Dixon (5)	7,364	24–11	—	Box Score	Recap
April 14	6:30 p.m.	ESPN+	at Baylor	No. 19	Baylor Ballpark • Waco, TX	**W** 11–9	**Gordon** **(4–0)**	Helton (0–4)	—	2,612	25–11	7–3	Box Score	Recap
April 15	2:00 p.m.	ESPN+	at Baylor	No. 19	Baylor Ballpark • Waco, TX	**L** 9–10	Stasio (3–2)	**Morehouse** **(4–2)**	—	2,975	25–12	7–4	Box Score	Recap
April 16	1:00 p.m.	ESPN+	at Baylor	No. 19	Baylor Ballpark • Waco, TX	**W** 7–6	**Shaw** **(2–1)**	Golomb (1–2)	**Johnson Jr.** **(1)**	2,986	26–12	8–4	Box Score	Recap
April 19	6:30 p.m.	LHN	Abilene Christian*	No. 14	UFCU Disch–Falk Field • Austin, TX	**W** 20–0	**Minchey** **(2–0)**	Anderson (4–3)	—	6,446	27–12	—	Box Score	Recap
April 21	7:00 p.m.	LHN	Oklahoma	No. 14	UFCU Disch–Falk Field • Austin, TX	**L** 1–2	Campbell (5–3)	**Shaw** **(2–2)**	—	7,156	27–13	8–5	Box Score	Recap
April 22	2:30 p.m. (Note: Game 1 of doubleheader.)	LHN	Oklahoma	No. 14	UFCU Disch–Falk Field • Austin, TX	**L** 6–9	Carmichael (3–0)	**Sthele** **(2–4)**	Campbell (1)	7,345	27–14	8–6	Box Score	Recap
April 22 (Note: Originally scheduled for April 23rd, but moved to April 22nd as the second part of a doubleheader due to weather forecast.)	6:30 p.m. (Note: Game 2 of doubleheader, 45 minutes after conclusion of Game 1.)	LHN	Oklahoma	No. 14	UFCU Disch–Falk Field • Austin, TX	**L** 4–6	Hitt (3–0)	**Minchey** **(2–1)**	Weber (7)	7,887 (Note: 7,887 is 8th largest attendance in history of UFCU Disch–Falk Field to date)	27–15	8–7	Box Score	Recap
April 25	6:30 p.m.	LHN	Texas Southern*		UFCU Disch–Falk Field • Austin, TX	**W** 18–3	**Burke** **(1–0)**	Zwitzer (1–3)	—	6,382	28–15	—	Box Score	Recap
April 28	6:30 p.m.	ESPNU	at TCU		Lupton Stadium • Fort Worth, TX	Postponed to Monday, May 1, due to potential bad weather								
April 29	6:00 p.m. (Note: Originally scheduled for 4:00 p.m. but pushed back to 6:00 p.m.)	ESPNU	at TCU		Lupton Stadium • Fort Worth, TX	**W** 8–4	**Gordon** **(5–0)**	Klecker (7–4)	—	5,166	29–15	9–7	Box Score	Recap
April 30	3:00 p.m. (Note: Originally scheduled for 1:00 p.m. but pushed back to 3:00 p.m.)	ESPNU	at TCU		Lupton Stadium • Fort Worth, TX	**W** 3–2	**Johnson Jr.** **(4–2)**	Savage (1–3)	**Shaw** **(1)**	5,047	30–15	10–7		

May (8–3)
Date	Time (CT)	TV	Opponent	Rank	Stadium	Score	Win	Loss	Save	Attendance	Overall record	Big 12 Record	Box Score	Recap
May 1 (Note: Originally scheduled for Friday April 28, postponed due to bad weather)	1:00 p.m.	ESPN+	at TCU		Lupton Stadium • Fort Worth, TX	**L** 7–15	Feser (1–0)	**Witt** **(0–1)**	—	3,982	30–16	10–8	Box Score	Recap
May 5	6:00 p.m.	ESPN+	at Kansas		Hoglund Ballpark • Lawrence, KS	**L** 4–10	Baumgartner (5–1)	**Gordon** **(5–1)**	—	850	30–17	10–9	Box Score	Recap
May 6	2:00 p.m.	ESPN+	at Kansas		Hoglund Ballpark • Lawrence, KS	**W** 6–2 (Note: Dylan Campbell extended his hitting streak to 25 games, typing the program record at Texas)	**Johnson Jr.** **(5–2)**	Cashero (2–1)	**Duplantier II** **(1)**	1,036	31–17	11–9	Box Score	Recap
May 7	1:00 p.m.	ESPN+	at Kansas		Hoglund Ballpark • Lawrence, KS	**W** 7–6 (Note: Dylan Campbell went 2–3 and extended his higging streak to 26 games, breaking the all-time record at Texas of 25 games, set in 2008 by Michael Torres)	**Sthele** **(3–4)**	Trumper (3–4)	**Whitehead** **(1)**	825	32–17	12–9	Box Score	Recap
May 9	6:30 p.m.	LHN	UT Arlington*		UFCU Disch–Falk Field • Austin, TX	**W** 10–5	**Hurley** **(4–0)**	Lucas (1–2)	—	6,514	33–17	—	Box Score	Recap
May 12	2:00 p.m. (Note: Originally scheduled for 6:30 pm, Game 1 was pushed up to 2 pm as part of Friday Doubleheader due to inclement weather)	LHN	San Jose State*		UFCU Disch–Falk Field • Austin, TX	**L** 4–6	Van Allen (2–3)	**Morehouse** **(4–3)**	White (1)	6,371	33–18	—	Box Score	Recap
May 12 (Note: Originally scheduled for May 13, Game 2 was moved to Friday as part of a Doubleheader due to inclement weather)	6:30 p.m.	LHN	San Jose State*		UFCU Disch–Falk Field • Austin, TX	**W** 24–3	**Johnson Jr.** **(6–2)**	Thomspon (2–5)	—	6,714	34–18	—	Box Score	Recap
May 13 (Note: Originally scheduled for May 14, Game 3 was moved to Saturday May 13 due to inclement weather)	2:30 p.m.	LHN	San Jose State*		UFCU Disch–Falk Field • Austin, TX	**W** 18–6	**Witt** **(1–1)**	Ross (2–1)	**Sthele** **(1)**	6,389	35–18	—	Box Score	Recap
May 18	6:30 p.m.	LHN	No. 6 West Virginia		UFCU Disch–Falk Field • Austin, TX	**W** 12–2	**Gordon** **(6–1)**	Estridge (3–1)	—	6,662	36–18	13–9	Box Score	Recap
May 19	6:30 p.m.	LHN	No. 6 West Virginia		UFCU Disch–Falk Field • Austin, TX	**W** 10–4	**Johnson Jr.** **(7–2)**	Traxel (7–5)	—	7,015	37–18	14–9	Box Score	Recap
May 20	2:30 p.m.	LHN	No. 6 West Virginia		UFCU Disch–Falk Field • Austin, TX	**W** 7–3 (Note: With the sweep of No. 6 West Virginia, Texas earns a share of the 2023 Big 12 Regular season Championship. Texas tied West Virginia and Oklahoma State with a 15–9 conference record. Due to tiebreakers, Texas will be the top seeded team in the Big 12 tournament)	**Witt** **(2–1)**	Hampton (5–3)	**Hurley** **(3)**	7,468	38–18	15–9	Box Score	Recap

Postseason (4–4)

Big 12 Tournament (0–2)
Date	Time (CT)	TV	Opponent	Seed	Stadium	Score	Win	Loss	Save	Attendance	Overall record	Tournament record	Box Score	Recap
May 24	12:30 p.m.	ESPN+	vs. (8) Kansas	(1) No. 20	Globe Life Field • Arlington, TX	**L** 3–6	Baumgartner (6–1)	**Sthele** **(3–5)**	Trumper (2)	6,593	38–19	0–1	Box Score	Recap
May 25	9:00 a.m.	ESPN+	vs. (5) Kansas State	(1) No. 20	Globe Life Field • Arlington, TX	**L** 0–6	Ruhl (4–4)	**Johnson Jr.** **(7–3)**	Neighbors (11)		38–20	0–2	Box Score	Recap (Note: With a single in the bottom of the 8th inning, Dylan Campbell extended his hitting streak to 35 games, tying the Big 12 All-Time record.)

NCAA Coral Gables Regional (3–0)
Date	Time (CT)	TV	Opponent	Seed	Stadium	Score	Win	Loss	Save	Attendance	Overall record	Regional Record	Box Score	Recap
June 2	2:45 p.m. (Note: Scheduled for 1:00 p.m. but delayed due to weather delaying the previous game)	LHN	vs. (3) Louisiana	(2)	Alex Rodriguez Park at Mark Light Field • Coral Gables, FL	**W** 4–2	**Gordon** **(7–1)**	Nezuh (9–6)	**Morehouse** **(6)**	2,370	39–20	1–0	Box Score	Recap (Note: With a single in the bottom of the 6th inning, Dylan Campbell extended his hitting streak to 36 games, breaking the Big 12 Conference All-Time record)
June 3	7:35 p.m. (Note: Scheduled for 5:00 p.m. but delayed due to weather)	ESPNU	at (1) No. 9 Miami (FL)	(2)	Alex Rodriguez Park at Mark Light Field • Coral Gables, FL	**W** 4–1	**Johnson Jr.** **(8–3)** (Note: Lebarron Johnson Jr. pictched first complete game of his career and first by a Texas pitcher this season. THis was also the first by a Texas pitcher in NCAA tournament play since 2014.)	Ligon (3–2)	—	3,306	40–20	2–0	Box Score	Recap
June 4	5:00 p.m.	ESPNU	vs (1) No. 9 Miami (FL) (Note: Texas was the designated Home team); Regional Final	(2)	Alex Rodriguez Park at Mark Light Field • Coral Gables, FL	**W** 10–6	**Hurley** **(5–0)**	Gallo (2–4)	—	2,715	41–20	3–0	Box Score	Recap

NCAA Stanford Super Regional (1–2)
Date	Time (CT)	TV	Opponent	National Seed	Stadium	Score	Win	Loss	Save	Attendance	Overall record	Super Regional Record	Box Score	Recap
June 10	5:00 p.m.	ESPN2	at (8) No. 6 Stanford		Klein Field at Sunken Diamond • Stanford, CA	**W** 7–5	**Whitehead** **(4–0)**	Scott (5–4)	**Morehouse** **(7)**	2,975	42–20	1–0	Box Score	Recap (Note: Dylan Campbell went 0-3 with a catcher's interference call in the 8th and an intentional walk in the 9th. This ends his Texas and Big 12 record hitting streak at 38 games.)
June 11	8:00 p.m.	ESPN2	vs. (8) No. 6 Stanford		Klein Field at Sunken Diamond • Stanford, CA	**L** 3–8	Mathews (10–4)	**Johnson Jr.** **(8–4)**	—	2,904	42–21	1–1	Box Score	Recap
June 12	7:00 p.m.	ESPN	at (8) No. 6 Stanford		Klein Field at Sunken Diamond • Stanford, CA	**L** 6–7	Dixon (7–0)	**Gordon** **(7–2)**	—	2,995	42–22	1–2	Box Score	Recap

* indicates a non-conference game. All rankings from D1Baseball on the date of the contest. Source:

Schedule Notes

== Postseason ==
=== Big 12 Tournament ===
First round May 24-May 25
1	Texas	3
8	Kansas	6
4	TCU	16^{7}
5	Kansas State	3
1	Texas	0
5	Kansas State	6
2	Oklahoma State	5
7	Oklahoma	9
3	West Virginia	2
6	Texas Tech	6
2	Oklahoma State	3
3	West Virginia	2

Second round May 25–May 26
8	Kansas	4
4	TCU	14^{8}
5	Kansas State	7
8	Kansas	1
7	Oklahoma	9
6	Texas Tech	10
2	Oklahoma State	8
7	Oklahoma	3

Semifinals; May 27
4	TCU	6	-
5	Kansas State	3	-
6	Texas Tech	1	5
2	Oklahoma State	8	6

Finals; May 28
4	TCU	12
2	Oklahoma State	5

=== NCAA tournament ===
==== Stanford Super Regional ====
Regional	Regional
1	Stanford	13
4	San Jose State	2
1	Stanford	5
2	Texas A&M	8
3	Cal State Fullerton	7
2	Texas A&M	12
Stanford Regional – Sunken Diamond
4	San Jose State	5
3	Cal State Fullerton	9
3	Cal State Fullerton	5
1	Stanford	6
1	Miami (FL)	9
4	Maine	1
1	Miami (FL)	1
2	Texas	4
3	Louisiana	2
2	Texas	4
Coral Gables Regional – Alex Rodriguez Park at Mark Light Field
4	Maine	10
3	Louisiana	19
3	Louisiana	5
1	Miami (FL)	8

Regional Final
2	Texas A&M	5	1
1	Stanford	13	7
2	Texas	10	–
1	Miami (FL)	6	–

Super Regional; June 10–12
8	Stanford	5	8	7
Texas	7	3	6

== Statistics ==
Final Statistics for 2023 Season

=== Team batting ===
Team	AB	Avg.	H	2B	3B	HR	RBI	BB	SO	SB
Texas	2152	0.293	630	130	16	91	427	302	502	68
Opponents	2119	0.245	519	109	12	41	272	273	560	50

=== Team pitching ===
Team	IP	H	R	ER	BB	SO	SV	ERA
Texas	565.2	519	295	263	273	560	17	4.18
Opponents	542.0	630	457	406	302	502	12	6.74

=== Individual batting ===
Note: leaders must meet the minimum requirement of 2 PA/G and 75% of games played

Player	GP	AB	Avg.	H	2B	3B	HR	RBI	BB	SO	SB
Dylan Campbell	64	242	0.339	82	19	3	13	50	39	43	26
Peyton Powell	63	230	0.339	78	16	1	10	46	37	42	2
Porter Brown	64	235	0.323	76	14	1	12	59	40	55	11
Jared Thomas	64	215	0.321	69	15	4	4	29	27	38	10
Eric Kennedy	63	245	0.306	75	14	2	17	47	18	58	9
Garret Guillemette	64	218	0.298	65	18	1	11	60	34	52	0
Jack O'Dowd	64	222	0.284	63	13	2	6	37	23	43	1
Mitchell Daly	61	186	0.231	43	9	1	7	22	27	48	4
Tanner Carlson	32	62	0.306	19	4	0	2	14	7	13	0
Max Belyeu	15	20	0.300	6	1	0	0	2	1	8	0
Jayden Duplantier	34	43	0.256	11	3	0	0	7	5	9	0
Rylan Galvan	34	84	0.226	19	1	1	4	19	16	37	1
Cam Constantine	17	20	0.200	4	1	0	1	2	5	8	1
Jalin Flores	45	103	0.175	18	2	0	4	23	15	37	0
Ace Whitehead	34	18	0.111	2	0	0	0	7	5	7	3
Cade O'Hara	12	7	0.000	0	0	0	0	2	1	4	0
Preston Hoffart	5	2	0.000	0	0	0	0	1	2	0	0

=== Individual pitching ===
Note: leaders must meet the minimum requirement of 1 IP/G

Player	GP	GS	W	L	IP	H	R	ER	BB	SO	SV	ERA
Lucas Gordon	19	17	7	2	102.2	85	33	30	34	103	0	2.63
Lebarron Johnson Jr.	20	13	8	4	86.2	73	31	28	38	98	1	2.91
Heston Tole	19	0	0	0	23.2	17	5	5	13	20	1	1.90
DJ Burke	15	2	1	0	24.1	20	6	6	10	17	1	2.22
Andre Duplantier II	19	0	0	0	15.0	17	8	4	9	16	1	2.40
David Shaw	26	0	2	2	32.0	22	13	11	14	30	1	3.09
Cody Howard	8	0	1	0	9.0	10	4	4	7	12	0	4.00
Ace Whitehead	16	4	4	0	26.1	31	15	12	12	24	1	4.10
Charlie Hurley	22	5	5	0	55.0	48	27	27	27	45	3	4.42
Chase Lummus	11	0	1	1	15.2	14	9	9	4	12	0	5.17
Zane Morehouse	28	4	4	3	57.0	57	37	33	29	60	7	5.21
Kobe Minchey	9	3	2	1	12.0	10	8	7	9	13	0	5.25
Travis Sthele	15	10	3	5	61.0	65	49	39	31	66	1	5.75
Chris Stuart	15	0	1	1	15.0	11	12	12	14	18	0	7.20
Sam Walbridge	8	0	0	1	8.1	11	8	8	6	9	0	8.64
Max Grubbs	8	0	1	0	8.2	13	11	9	3	6	0	9.35
Tanner Witt	6	6	2	1	10.2	11	13	13	8	8	0	10.97
Pierce George	3	0	0	0	2.0	2	3	3	4	1	0	13.50
Cameron O'Banan	1	0	0	1	0.2	2	3	3	1	2	0	40.50

Legend
GP	Games played	GS	Games started	AB	At-bats
H	Hits	Avg.	Batting average	2B	Doubles
3B	Triples	HR	Home runs	RBI	Runs batted in
IP	Innings pitched	W	Wins	L	Losses
ERA	Earned run average	SO	Strikeouts	BB	Base on balls
SV	Saves	SB	Stolen bases	High	Team high

== Rankings ==
Ranking movements Legend: ██ Increase in ranking ██ Decrease in ranking — = Not ranked RV = Received votes т = Tied with team above or below
	Week																		
Poll	Pre	1	2	3	4	5	6	7	8	9	10	11	12	13	14	15	16	17	Final
Coaches'	24	24*	RV	—	—	—	19	19	18	14	RV	RV	RV	RV	22	RV	RV*	RV*	12
Baseball America	—	—	—	—	—	—	19	20	15	14	RV	RV	RV	RV	13	15	15*	15*	9
Collegiate Baseball^	25	—	—	—	—	—	15	13	12	12	RV	RV	RV	RV	13	15	10	11	11
NCBWA†	26	—	—	—	—	—	24	24	19	15	26	27	RV	RV	25	RV	16	16*	11 T
D1Baseball	—	—	—	—	—	—	21	21	19	14	RV	RV	RV	RV	20	RV	RV*	RV*	14

^ Collegiate Baseball ranked 40 teams in their preseason poll, but only ranked 30 teams weekly during the season.
† NCBWA ranks 30 teams in their preseason poll, but only ranks 25 teams weekly during the season.
* A new poll was not released for this week, so for comparison purposes, the previous week's ranking is inserted in this week's slot.
