= 2023 Texas Tech Red Raiders baseball team =

American college baseball season

2023 Texas Tech Red Raiders baseball

Gainesville Regional, 2–2
- Conference: Big 12 Conference
- Record: 39–21 (12–12 Big 12)
- Head coach: Tim Tadlock (11th season)
- Assistant coaches: J-Bob Thomas (11th season); Matt Gardner (11th season); Eric Gutierrez (5th season)
- Pitching coach: Ray Hayward (11th season)
- Home stadium: Dan Law Field at Rip Griffin Park

2023 Big 12 Conference baseball standings
| | Conf. | | | | Overall |
| Team | W | | L | PCT | W | | L | PCT |
|---|---|---|---|---|---|---|---|---|
| No. 14 Texas ‍†‍‍^{y} | 15 | – | 9 | .625 | 42 | – | 22 | .656 |
| Oklahoma State ‍†‍‍^{y} | 15 | – | 9 | .625 | 41 | – | 20 | .672 |
| West Virginia ‍†‍‍^{y} | 15 | – | 9 | .625 | 40 | – | 20 | .667 |
| No. 5 TCU ‍‍‡‍^{y} | 13 | – | 11 | .542 | 44 | – | 24 | .647 |
| Kansas State ‍‍‍ | 13 | – | 11 | .542 | 35 | – | 24 | .593 |
| Texas Tech ‍‍‍^{y} | 12 | – | 12 | .500 | 41 | – | 23 | .641 |
| Oklahoma ‍‍‍^{y} | 11 | – | 13 | .458 | 32 | – | 28 | .533 |
| Kansas ‍‍‍ | 8 | – | 16 | .333 | 25 | – | 32 | .439 |
| Baylor ‍‍‍ | 6 | – | 18 | .250 | 20 | – | 35 | .364 |
† – Conference champion ‡ – Tournament champion y – Invited to the NCAA tournament As of June 25, 2023; Rankings from D1baseball

The 2023 Texas Tech Red Raiders baseball team represented Texas Tech University during the 2023 NCAA Division I baseball season. The Red Raiders played their home games at Dan Law Field at Rip Griffin Park in Lubbock, Texas and competed as members of the Big 12 Conference. They were led by eleventh-year head coach Tim Tadlock.

== Previous season ==
The 2022 team finished the regular season 36–18, 15–9 in Big 12 play, finishing fourth in the conference. The team went 1–2 in the Big 12 tournament, defeating Kansas State in game 1, losing to Oklahoma in game 2 and were eliminated by Kansas State in game 3. The Red Raiders were invited to the Statesboro Regional, going 2–2. The team was defeated by Notre Dame in game 1, before defeating UNC Greensboro and host Georgia Southern in the next two games. The Red Raiders would be eliminated from the tournament in game 4, losing 1–2 against Notre Dame. The 2022 team finished the season with an overall record of 39–22.

=== Players drafted into the MLB ===
| Round | Pick | Player | Position | MLB Club |
|---|---|---|---|---|
| 1 | 12 | Jace Jung | 2B | Detroit Tigers |
| 4 | 114 | Andrew Morris | P | Minnesota Twins |
| 5 | 143 | Brandon Birdsell | P | Chicago Cubs |
| 6 | 190 | Chase Hampton | P | New York Yankees |

== Preseason ==
=== Big 12 media poll ===
The Big 12's preseason poll was released on January 26.

Big 12 media poll
| Predicted finish | Team | Votes (1st place) |
| 1 | TCU | 61 (5) |
| 2 | Oklahoma State | 59 (4) |
| 3 | Texas Tech | 48 |
| 4 | Texas | 43 |
| 5 | Oklahoma | 38 |
| 6 | West Virginia | 28 |
| 7 | Kansas State | 17 |
| 8 | Kansas | 16 |
| 9 | Baylor | 14 |

== Personnel ==
=== Coaching staff ===
| Name | Position | Seasons at Texas Tech | Alma mater |
|---|---|---|---|
| Tim Tadlock | Head coach | 11 | Texas Tech University (1992) |
| Matt Gardner | Assistant Coach | 11 | Oklahoma State University (2008) |
| J-Bob Thomas | Assistant Coach / Recruiting Coordinator | 11 | Abilene Christian University (2005) |
| Ray Hayward | Special Assistant / Pitching Coach | 11 | University of Oklahoma (1983) |
| Eric Gutierrez | Volunteer Assistant Coach | 5 | Texas Tech University (2016) |

=== Roster ===
2023 Texas Tech Red Raiders Baseball Roster
| Pitchers: 11 Andrew Devine (RHP) – junior (5'10, 170); 16 Hayde Kay (RHP) – junior (6'0, 205); 21 Mason Molina (LHP) – sophomore (6'2, 215); 25 Owen Washburn (RHP) – sophomore (6'1, 200); 28 Taber Fast (LHP) – freshman (6'1, 205); 30 Bo Blessie (RHP) – senior (6'3, 200); 31 Damien Bravo (RHP) – freshman (6'2, 195); 32 Trendan Parish (RHP) – sophomore (6'0, 175); 34 Zane Petty (RHP) – freshman (6'1, 165); 35 Garrett Crowley (LHP) – senior (6'4, 215); 36 Dax Dathe (RHP) – junior (6'3, 210); 38 Jacob Rogers (RHP) – freshman (6'2, 200); 39 Jase Lopez (RHP) – junior (6'0, 195); 40 Brendan Girton (RHP) – (redshirt) sophomore (6'2, 220); 42 Kyle Robinson (RHP) – sophomore (6'6, 210); 43 Brendan Lysik (LHP) – sophomore (6'5, 225); 44 Brandon Beckel (RHP) – junior (6'4, 225); 45 Derek Bridges (LHP) – junior (6'1, 230); 46 Ryan Free (LHP) – junior (6'2, 190); 47 Ethan Coombes (RHP) – senior (6'2, 200); 51 Zach Erdman (LHP) – freshman (6'2, 185); 52 Josh Sanders (RHP) – junior (6'3, 180); 53 Nolan Foster (RHP) – freshman (6'3, 175); 54 Jack Livingstone (RHP) – freshman (6'3, 195) | Catchers: 4 Kevin Bazzell – (redshirt) freshman (6'1, 205); 5 Hudson White – sophomore (6'1, 200); 26 Dylan Maxcey – freshman (5'9, 165); Infielders: 3 Tracer Lopez – freshman (5'10, 155); 4 Kevin Bazzell – (redshirt) freshman (6'1, 205); 5 Hudson White – sophomore (6'1, 200); 8 Cade McGarrh – freshman (6'3, 160); 9 Zac Vooletich – senior (5'10, 190); 10 Ty Coleman – senior (5'9, 195); 13 Gavin Kash – sophomore (6'3, 210); 15 Will Burns – freshman (6'2, 180); 20 Austin Green – junior (6'0, 195); 33 Ryan Brome – sophomore (6'1, 220); 50 Drew Woodcox – junior (6'0, 205); Outfielders: 1 Dillon Carter – junior (6'1, 215); 2 Gage Harrelson – freshman (6'3, 175); 7 Jeric Curtis – freshman (6'0, 170); 9 Zac Vooletich – senior (5'10, 190); 10 Ty Coleman – senior (5'9, 195); 20 Austin Green – junior (6'0, 195); 25 Owen Washburn – sophomore (6'1, 200); 33 Ryan Brome – sophomore (6'1, 220); 41 Nolan Hester – senior (5'10, 185); 50 Drew Woodcox – junior (6'0, 205) |

== Schedule ==
2023 Texas Tech Red Raiders baseball game log: 29–13
Regular season: 29–13

February: 9–0
| Date | Time | Opponent | Rank | Stadium | Score | Win | Loss | Save | Attendance | Overall | Big 12 | Ref |
|---|---|---|---|---|---|---|---|---|---|---|---|---|
| February 17 | 1:00 p.m. | Gonzaga* | No. 24 | Dan Law Field; Lubbock, TX | **W** 8–4 | **Girton** (1–0) | Haas (0–1) | — | 3,744 | 1–0 | — | |
| February 18 | 2:00 p.m. | Gonzaga* | No. 24 | Dan Law Field; Lubbock, TX | **W** 10–3 | **Molina** (1–0) | Deschryver (0–1) | — | 4,010 | 2–0 | — | |
| February 19 | 1:00 p.m. | Gonzaga* | No. 24 | Dan Law Field; Lubbock, TX | **W** 12–3 | **Blessie** (1–0) | Mullan (0–1) | — | 4,409 | 3–0 | — | |
| February 20 | 11:00 a.m. | Gonzaga* | No. 24 | Dan Law Field; Lubbock, TX | **W** 9–8 | **Bravo** (1–0) | McGee (0–1) | — | 3,514 | 4–0 | — | |
| February 24 | 1:00 p.m. | Western Illinois* | No. 24 | Dan Law Field; Lubbock, TX | **W** 11–3 | **Girton** (2–0) | Sampson (0–1) | — | 3,148 | 5–0 | — | |
| February 25 | 12:00 p.m. | Western Illinois* | No. 24 | Dan Law Field; Lubbock, TX | **W** 24–9 | **Beckel** (1–0) | Armstrong (1–1) | — | 3,989 | 6–0 | — | |
| February 25 | 4:15 p.m. | Western Illinois* | No. 24 | Dan Law Field; Lubbock, TX | **W** 6–5 | **Parish** (1–0) | Herrmann (0–1) | — | 3,989 | 7–0 | — | |
| February 26 | 1:00 p.m. | Western Illinois* | No. 24 | Dan Law Field; Lubbock, TX | **W** 14–8 | **Devine** (1–0) | Harrington (0–1) | — | 3,732 | 8–0 | — | |
| February 28 | 6:30 p.m. | Air Force* | No. 24 | Dan Law Field; Lubbock, TX | **W** 9–4 | **Erdman** (1–0) | Sansing (0–1) | — | 3,941 | 9–0 | — | |

March: 10–8
| Date | Time | Opponent | Rank | Stadium | Score | Win | Loss | Save | Attendance | Overall | Big 12 | Ref |
|---|---|---|---|---|---|---|---|---|---|---|---|---|
| March 1 | 2:00 p.m. | Air Force* | No. 24 | Dan Law Field; Lubbock, TX | **W** 18–5 | **Rogers** (1–0) | Shuger (0–1) | — | 3,227 | 10–0 | — | |
Shriner's Children's College Classic
| March 3 | 11:00 a.m. | vs. Rice* | No. 24 | Minute Maid Park; Houston, TX | **L** 2–3 | Long (1–0) | **Devine** (0–1) | — | | 10–1 | — | |
| March 4 | 11:00 a.m. | vs. Michigan* | No. 24 | Minute Maid Park; Houston, TX | **W** 10–7 | **Molina** (2–0) | Allen (1–1) | **Lopez** (1) | | 11–1 | — | |
| March 5 | 7:00 p.m. | vs. No. 15 Texas A&M* | No. 24 | Minute Maid Park; Houston, TX | **L** 2–4 (16) | Aschenbeck (2–0) | **Rogers** (1–1) | Lamkin (1) | 9,534 | 11–2 | — | |
| March 7 | 2:00 p.m. | New Mexico* | | Dan Law Field; Lubbock, TX | **W** 6–3 | **Lopez** (1–0) | Bannister (0–1) | **Devine** (1) | 3,438 | 12–2 | — | |
| March 10 | 6:30 p.m. | No. 23 Iowa* | | Dan Law Field; Lubbock, TX | **W** 17–5 | **Free** (1–0) | Langenberg (1–2) | — | 3,807 | 13–2 | — | |
| March 11 | 2:00 p.m. | No. 23 Iowa* | | Dan Law Field; Lubbock, TX | **W** 8–3 | **Beckel** (2–0) | Brecht (1–1) | **Parish** (1) | 4,142 | 14–2 | — | |
| March 12 | 1:00 p.m. | No. 23 Iowa* | | Dan Law Field; Lubbock, TX | **L** 9–10 | Obermueller (1–0) | **Free** (1–1) | — | 3,935 | 14–3 | — | |
| March 14 | 6:30 p.m. | UT Arlington* | No. 22 | Dan Law Field; Lubbock, TX | **W** 10–1 | **Petty** (1–0) | Lucas (0–1) | — | 3,751 | 15–3 | — | |
| March 15 | 2:00 p.m. | UT Arlington* | No. 22 | Dan Law Field; Lubbock, TX | **W** 14–7 | **Sanders** (1–0) | Hackett (0–1) | — | 3,878 | 16–3 | — | |
| March 17 | 6:30 p.m. | No. 12 Oklahoma State | No. 22 | Dan Law Field; Lubbock, TX | **W** 8–7 (10) | **Free** (2–1) | McLean (0–1) | — | 3,713 | 17–3 | 1–0 | |
| March 18 | 2:00 p.m. | No. 12 Oklahoma State | No. 22 | Dan Law Field; Lubbock, TX | **L** 4–9 | Abram (3–0) | **Molina** (2–1) | — | 4,021 | 17–4 | 1–1 | |
| March 19 | 2:00 p.m. | No. 12 Oklahoma State | No. 22 | Dan Law Field; Lubbock, TX | **W** 12–1 (7) | **Beckel** (3–0) | Watts-Brown (2–1) | — | 3,746 | 18–4 | 2–1 | |
| March 24 | 7:00 p.m. | at Texas | No. 14 | UFCU Disch–Falk Field; Austin, TX | **L** 2–6 | Morehouse (3–0) | **Free** (2–2) | — | 6,654 | 18–5 | 2–2 | |
| March 25 | 2:30 p.m. | at Texas | No. 14 | UFCU Disch–Falk Field; Austin, TX | **L** 5–6 | Morehouse (4–0) | **Devine** (1–2) | — | 7,123 | 18–6 | 2–3 | |
| March 26 | 2:30 p.m. | at Texas | No. 14 | UFCU Disch–Falk Field; Austin, TX | **L** 8–9 | Whitehead (2–0) | **Lysik** (0–1) | — | 6,744 | 18–7 | 2–4 | |
| March 28 | 3:00 p.m. | at New Mexico* | No. 22 | Santa Ana Star Field; Albuquerque, NM | **L** 10–11 | McBroom (1–0) | **Free** (2–3) | — | 643 | 18–8 | — | |
| March 31 | 6:30 p.m. | TCU | No. 22 | Dan Law Field; Lubbock, TX | **W** 20–16 | **Coombes** (1–0) | Abeldt (1–2) | **Beckel** (1) | 4,411 | 19–8 | 3–4 | |

April: 11–7
| Date | Time | Opponent | Rank | Stadium | Score | Win | Loss | Save | Attendance | Overall | Big 12 | Ref |
|---|---|---|---|---|---|---|---|---|---|---|---|---|
| April 1 | 2:00 p.m. | TCU | No. 22 | Dan Law Field; Lubbock, TX | **L** 7–10 | Klecker (5–2) | **Molina** (2–2) | Wright (1) | 4,432 | 19–9 | 3–5 | |
| April 2 | 2:00 p.m. | TCU | No. 22 | Dan Law Field; Lubbock, TX | **W** 10–5 | **Free** (3–3) | Brown (2–1) | **Beckel** (2) | 4,432 | 20–9 | 4–5 | |
| April 4 | 6:30 p.m. | Abilene Christian* | No. 22 | Dan Law Field; Lubbock, TX | **Postponed to May 9** | | | | | | | |
| April 6 | 6:30 p.m. | North Dakota State* | No. 22 | Dan Law Field; Lubbock, TX | **Postponed to April 8** | | | | | | | |
| April 7 | 6:30 p.m. | North Dakota State* | No. 22 | Dan Law Field; Lubbock, TX | **L** 1–8 | Feeney (3–3) | **Girton** (2–1) | Riedinger (3) | 3,685 | 20–10 | — | |
| April 8 | 2:00 p.m. | North Dakota State* | No. 22 | Dan Law Field; Lubbock, TX | **W** 8–5 | **Molina** (3–2) | Roehrich (2–5) | **Free** (1) | 4,432 | 21–10 | — | |
| April 8 | 5:45 p.m. | North Dakota State* | No. 22 | Dan Law Field; Lubbock, TX | **W** 8–3 | **Parish** (2–0) | Jacobs (0–4) | **Robinson** (1) | 4,432 | 22–10 | — | |
| April 10 | 8:00 p.m. | at No. 8 Stanford* | No. 21 | Klein Field; Stanford, CA | **L** 4–6 | Meier (2–0) | **Devine** (1–3) | Bruno (3) | 2,062 | 22–11 | — | |
| April 11 | 4:00 p.m. | at No. 8 Stanford* | No. 21 | Klein Field; Stanford, CA | **W** 11–2 | **Beckel** (4–0) | Montgomery (1–1) | — | 1,406 | 23–11 | — | |
| April 14 | 6:30 p.m. | at Oklahoma | No. 21 | L. Dale Mitchell Baseball Park; Norman, OK | **W** 13–7 (10) | **Beckel** (5–0) | Weber (0–2) | — | 2,577 | 24–11 | 5–5 | |
| April 15 | 4:00 p.m. | at Oklahoma | No. 21 | L. Dale Mitchell Baseball Park; Norman, OK | **W** 9–5 | **Free** (4–3) | Douthit (4–2) | — | 3,074 | 25–11 | 6–5 | |
| April 16 | 2:00 p.m. | at Oklahoma | No. 21 | L. Dale Mitchell Baseball Park; Norman, OK | **L** 2–12 (8) | Carmichael (2–0) | **Rogers** (1–2) | — | 2,426 | 25–12 | 6–6 | |
| April 18 | 6:30 p.m. | Grand Canyon* | No. 16 | Dan Law Field; Lubbock, TX | **W** 6–1 | **Fast** (1–0) | Young (0–2) | — | 4,196 | 26–12 | — | |
| April 19 | 2:00 p.m. | Grand Canyon* | No. 16 | Dan Law Field; Lubbock, TX | **W** 11–6 | **Petty** (2–0) | Ohl (2–1) | — | 3,309 | 27–12 | — | |
| April 21 | 6:30 p.m. | Baylor | No. 16 | Dan Law Field; Lubbock, TX | **W** 10–1 | **Molina** (4–2) | Helton (0–5) | — | 4,432 | 28–12 | 7–6 | |
| April 22 | 12:00 p.m. | Baylor | No. 16 | Dan Law Field; Lubbock, TX | **W** 14–9 | **Free** (5–3) | Needham (0–1) | — | 4,432 | 29–12 | 8–6 | |
| April 22 | 3:50 p.m. | Baylor | No. 16 | Dan Law Field; Lubbock, TX | **L** 4–6 | Golomb (2–3) | **Robinson** (0–1) | Craig (2) | 3,966 | 29–13 | 8–7 | |
| April 25 | 6:30 p.m. | Abilene Christian* | No. 14 | Dan Law Field; Lubbock, TX | **Postponed in bottom of 4th inning, resumed on May 9** | | | | | | | |
| April 28 | 6:00 p.m. | at Kansas State | No. 14 | Frank Myers Field; Manhattan, KS | **L** 2–3 | Ruhl (3–3) | **Free** (5–4) | Neighbors (8) | 1,826 | 29–14 | 8–8 | |
| April 29 | 4:00 p.m. | at Kansas State | No. 14 | Frank Myers Field; Manhattan, KS | **W** 5–2 | **Parish** (3–0) | Fajardo (2–2) | **Robinson** (2) | 2,344 | 30–14 | 9–8 | |
| April 30 | 1:00 p.m. | at Kansas State | No. 14 | Frank Myers Field; Manhattan, KS | **L** 8–10 | Neighbors (4–1) | **Girton** (2–2) | — | 2,344 | 30–15 | 9–9 | |

May: 7–4
| Date | Time | Opponent | Rank | Site/stadium | Score | Win | Loss | Save | Attendance | Overall | Big 12 | Ref |
|---|---|---|---|---|---|---|---|---|---|---|---|---|
| May 5 | 6:30 p.m. | Sam Houston State* | | Dan Law Field; Lubbock, TX | **W** 12–10 | **Bridges** (1–0) | Davis (3–4) | **Beckel** (3) | 3,958 | 31–15 | — | |
| May 6 | 2:00 p.m. | Sam Houston State* | | Dan Law Field; Lubbock, TX | **L** 3–9 | Beard (6–3) | **Parish** (3–1) | — | 4,154 | 31–16 | — | |
| May 7 | 1:00 p.m. | Sam Houston State* | | Dan Law Field; Lubbock, TX | **W** 10–8 | **Sanders** (2–0) | Coldiron (2–3) | **Beckel** (4) | 4,261 | 32–16 | — | |
| May 9 | 4:00 p.m. | Abilene Christian* | | Dan Law Field; Lubbock, TX | **W** 15–11 | **Coombes** (2–0) | Smith (2–2) | — | 3,424 | 33–16 | — | |
| May 9 | 7:00 p.m. | Abilene Christian* | | Dan Law Field; Lubbock, TX | **W** 13–3 | **Rogers** (2–2) | Boggan (3–2) | — | 4,004 | 34–16 | — | |
| May 12 | 3:00 p.m. | No. 12 West Virginia | | Monongalia County Ballpark; Morgantown, WV | **W** 5–2 | **Coombes** (3–0) | Hampton (5–2) | **Beckel** (5) | 2,991 | 35–16 | 10–9 | |
| May 13 | 3:00 p.m. | No. 12 West Virginia | | Monongalia County Ballpark; Morgantown, WV | **L** 2–17 | Traxel (7–4) | **Parish** (3–2) | – | 3,227 | 35–17 | 10–10 | |
| May 14 | 12:00 p.m. | No. 12 West Virginia | | Monongalia County Ballpark; Morgantown, WV | **L** 3–5 | **Hagaman** (1–1) | **Sanders** (2–1) | Reed (7) | 3,312 | 35–18 | 10–11 | |
| May 18 | 6:30 p.m. | Kansas | | Dan Law Field; Lubbock, TX | **L** 1–3 | Trumper (4–5) | **Beckel** (5–1) | – | 3,403 | 35–19 | 10–12 | |
| May 19 | 6:30 p.m. | Kansas | | Dan Law Field; Lubbock, TX | **W** 8–7 (10) | **Robinson** (1–1) | Hewlett (0–5) | – | 3,678 | 36–19 | 11–12 | |
| May 20 | 2:00 p.m. | Kansas | | Dan Law Field; Lubbock, TX | **W** 15–1 (7) | **Petty** (3–0) | Brasosky (1–2) | – | 3,976 | 37–19 | 12–12 | |

Post–season: 0–0

Big 12 Tournament: 0–0
| Date | Time | Opponent | Seed/Rank | Stadium | Score | Win | Loss | Save | Attendance | Overall | B12T | Ref |
|---|---|---|---|---|---|---|---|---|---|---|---|---|
| May 24 | 7:30 p.m. | vs. (3) No. 21 West Virginia | (6) | Globe Life Field; Arlington, TX | | | | | | | | |

Legend: = Win = Loss = Canceled
Bold = Texas Tech team member

* indicates a non-conference game. All rankings from D1Baseball on the date of the contest. All times are in central time.

== Rankings ==
Ranking movements Legend: ██ Increase in ranking ██ Decrease in ranking — = Not ranked RV = Received votes т = Tied with team above or below
| | Week | | | | | | | | | | | | | | | | | | |
| Poll | Pre | 1 | 2 | 3 | 4 | 5 | 6 | 7 | 8 | 9 | 10 | 11 | 12 | 13 | 14 | 15 | 16 | 17 | Final |
|---|---|---|---|---|---|---|---|---|---|---|---|---|---|---|---|---|---|---|---|
| Coaches' | 21 | 21* | 16 | 21 | 19 | 14 | 21 | 23 | 22 | 19 | 15 | 24 | 25T | RV | — | — | — | —* | RV |
| Baseball America | 23 | 22 | 18 | 25 | 20 | 16 | 20 | 18 | 19 | 15 | 10 | 15 | 15 | — | — | — | — | —* | — |
| Collegiate Baseball^ | 17 | 17 | 13 | 18 | 16 | 12 | 22 | 23 | 23 | 21 | 22 | — | — | — | — | — | — | — | — |
| NCBWA† | 22 | 20 | 16 | 21 | 18 | 14 | 19 | 19 | 20 | 18 | 15 | 24 | 24 | 28 | 30 | RV | 29 | 29* | 29T |
| D1Baseball | 24 | 24 | 24 | — | 22 | 14 | 22 | 22 | 21 | 16 | 14 | — | — | — | — | — | — | —* | — |

^ Collegiate Baseball ranked 40 teams in their preseason poll, but only ranked 30 teams weekly during the season.
† NCBWA ranks 30 teams in their preseason poll, but only ranks 25 teams weekly during the season.
* A new poll was not released for this week, so for comparison purposes, the previous week's ranking is inserted in this week's slot.
