= 2023 West Virginia Mountaineers baseball team =

College Baseball Season

2023 West Virginia Mountaineers baseball

Big 12 Regular season champions

NCAA Lexington Regional, L 1-2
- Conference: Big 12 Conference

Ranking
- Coaches: No. 22
- CB: No. 29
- Record: 40-20 (15–9 Big 12)
- Head coach: Randy Mazey (11th season)
- Assistant coaches: Steve Sabins (2nd season); Mark Ginther (5th season); Jacob Garcia (4th season)
- Home stadium: Monongalia County Ballpark

2023 Big 12 Conference baseball standings
	Conf.				Overall
Team	W		L	PCT	W		L	PCT
No. 14 Texas ‍†‍‍^{y}	15	–	9	.625	42	–	22	.656
Oklahoma State ‍†‍‍^{y}	15	–	9	.625	41	–	20	.672
West Virginia ‍†‍‍^{y}	15	–	9	.625	40	–	20	.667
No. 5 TCU ‍‍‡‍^{y}	13	–	11	.542	44	–	24	.647
Kansas State ‍‍‍	13	–	11	.542	35	–	24	.593
Texas Tech ‍‍‍^{y}	12	–	12	.500	41	–	23	.641
Oklahoma ‍‍‍^{y}	11	–	13	.458	32	–	28	.533
Kansas ‍‍‍	8	–	16	.333	25	–	32	.439
Baylor ‍‍‍	6	–	18	.250	20	–	35	.364
† – Conference champion ‡ – Tournament champion y – Invited to the NCAA tournament As of June 25, 2023; Rankings from D1baseball

The 2023 West Virginia Mountaineers baseball team represent the West Virginia University during the 2023 NCAA Division I baseball season. The Mountaineers played their home games at Monongalia County Ballpark as a member of the Big 12 Conference. They are led by head coach Randy Mazey, in his 11th season at West Virginia.

The Mountaineers traveled to Salt River Fields at Talking Stick in Scottsdale, Arizona to take part in an MLB Spring Training game against the Arizona Diamondbacks on February 27. West Virginia finished as the Big 12 regular season champions, an honor they shared with the Texas Longhorns.

== Schedule ==
2023 West Virginia Mountaineers baseball game log (40–20)
Legend: = Win = Loss = Canceled Bold = West Virginia team member
Regular season (40–20)

== Rankings ==
Ranking movements Legend: ██ Increase in ranking ██ Decrease in ranking — = Not ranked RV = Received votes
	Week																		
Poll	Pre	1	2	3	4	5	6	7	8	9	10	11	12	13	14	15	16	17	Final
Coaches'	—	—*	—	—	RV	RV	RV	24	RV	RV	21	14	11	7	17	22	22*	22*	RV
Baseball America	—	—	—	—	—	—	—	19	—	—	17	11	11	7	14	16	16*	16*	—
Collegiate Baseball^	—	—	—	—	—	—	—	28	—	—	18	17	12	8	18	29	—	—	—
NCBWA†	—	—	RV	—	RV	26	25	22	25	29	21	15	13	6	17	25	RV	RV*	RV
D1Baseball	—	—	—	—	—	24	24	24	—	—	18	12	12	6	21	—	—*	—*	—

^ Collegiate Baseball ranked 40 teams in their preseason poll, but only ranked 30 teams weekly during the season.
† NCBWA ranks 30 teams in their preseason poll, but only ranks 25 teams weekly during the season.
* A new poll was not released for this week, so for comparison purposes, the previous week's ranking is inserted in this week's slot.

== Personnel ==
=== Coaching staff ===
Name	Position	Seasons at WVU	Alma mater
Randy Mazey	Head coach	11	Clemson (1988)
Steve Sabins	Associate Head Coach	8	Embry–Riddle (2011)
Mark Ginther	Assistant Coach	5	Oklahoma State (2013)
Jacob Garcia	Assistant Coach	4	Northern Colorado (2018)

=== Roster ===
**2023 West Virginia Mountaineers Roster**
**Pitchers**: 1 Kevin Dowdell (LHP) – graduate (6'1, 210); 11 Ben Hampton (LHP) – junior (6'1, 205); 12 Blaine Traxel (RHP) – graduate (5'10, 200); 15 Maxx Yehl (LHP) – freshman (6'6, 225); 16 David Hagaman (RHP) – RS freshman (6'4, 190); 17 Carlson Reed (RHP) – junior (6'4, 195); 20 Nick Matson (LHP) – freshman (5'11, 160); 21 Cole Fehrman (LHP) – freshman (6'3, 180); 24 Aidan Major (RHP) – sophomore (5'11, 200); 30 Bryce Amos (RHP) – freshman (6'5, 235); 31 Jake Carr (LHP) – senior (5'10, 170); 32 Chris Sleeper (RHP) – sophomore (6'3, 225); 35 Gavin Van Kempen (RHP) – freshman (6'6, 225); 36 Noah Short (RHP) – graduate (6'1, 195); 37 Grant Siegel (RHP) – sophomore (6'1, 195); 40 Carson Estridge (RHP) – freshman (6'7, 205); 42 Tommy Beam (RHP) – RS freshman (6'7, 205); 43 Robby Porco (RHP) – freshman (6'8, 235); 44 Keegan Allen (RHP) – sophomore (6'0, 180); 45 Michael Kilker (RHP) – sophomore (6'2, 205); 46 Will Watson (RHP) – sophomore (6'6, 245)	**Catchers**: 8 Dayne Leonard – graduate (6'0, 195); 33 Logan Sauve – freshman (5'10, 185); 41 Sam White – freshman (5'11, 195); 83 Zack Ramppen – freshman (5'9, 200); **Infielders**: 2 Tevin Tucker – graduate (6'0, 180); 7 Michael McKinney – freshman (6'3, 160); 8 Dayne Leonard – graduate (6'0, 195); 9 Grant Hussey – sophomore (6'3, 225); 23 Ellis Garcia – freshman (6'0, 215); 26 Nick Barone – freshman (6'0, 175); 27 JJ Wetherholt – sophomore (5'10, 190); 41 Sam White – freshman (5'11, 195); 50 Caleb McNeely – RS senior (6'1, 180); 83 Zack Ramppen – freshman (5'9, 200); **Outfielders**: 1 Kevin Dowdell – graduate (6'1, 210); 5 Tyler Cox – sophomore (5'10, 185); 6 Evan Smith – sophomore (6'2, 205); 13 Braden Berry – junior (6'4, 190); 18 Skylar King – freshman (6'1, 180); 19 Tré Keels – freshman (6'0, 185); 25 Landon Wallace – junior (6'2, 170)
