= 2023 Big 12 Conference baseball tournament =

American college baseball tournament

- Teams: 8
- Format: Double-elimination tournament
- Finals site: Globe Life Field; Arlington, Texas
- Champions: TCU (4th title)
- Television: Bracket Play: ESPN+, ESPNU; Championship: ESPNU

2023 Big 12 Conference baseball standings
	Conf.				Overall
Team	W		L	PCT	W		L	PCT
No. 14 Texas ‍†‍‍^{y}	15	–	9	.625	42	–	22	.656
Oklahoma State ‍†‍‍^{y}	15	–	9	.625	41	–	20	.672
West Virginia ‍†‍‍^{y}	15	–	9	.625	40	–	20	.667
No. 5 TCU ‍‍‡‍^{y}	13	–	11	.542	44	–	24	.647
Kansas State ‍‍‍	13	–	11	.542	35	–	24	.593
Texas Tech ‍‍‍^{y}	12	–	12	.500	41	–	23	.641
Oklahoma ‍‍‍^{y}	11	–	13	.458	32	–	28	.533
Kansas ‍‍‍	8	–	16	.333	25	–	32	.439
Baylor ‍‍‍	6	–	18	.250	20	–	35	.364
† – Conference champion ‡ – Tournament champion y – Invited to the NCAA tournament As of June 25, 2023; Rankings from D1baseball

The 2023 Big 12 Conference baseball tournament was held from May 24 through 28 at Globe Life Field in Arlington, Texas. The annual tournament determines the conference champion of the Division I Big 12 Conference for college baseball. The winner of the tournament earned the league's automatic bid to the 2023 NCAA Division I baseball tournament.

The tournament has been held since 1997, the inaugural year of the Big 12 Conference. Among current league members, Texas has won the most championships with five. Among original members, Kansas State has never won the event. Defending champion Oklahoma won their third championship in 2021, matching Oklahoma State. Iowa State discontinued their program after the 2001 season without having won a title. Having joined in 2013, TCU won titles in 2014, 2016, and 2021, while West Virginia has yet to win the Tournament.

== Format and seeding ==
The top eight finishers from the regular season will be seeded one through eight, and will then play a two-bracket double-elimination tournament leading to a winner-take-all championship game.

== Bracket ==
First round May 24-May 25
1	Texas	3
8	Kansas	6
4	TCU	16^{7}
5	Kansas State	3
1	Texas	0
5	Kansas State	6
2	Oklahoma State	5
7	Oklahoma	9
3	West Virginia	2
6	Texas Tech	6
2	Oklahoma State	3
3	West Virginia	2

Second round May 25–May 26
8	Kansas	4
4	TCU	14^{8}
5	Kansas State	7
8	Kansas	1
7	Oklahoma	9
6	Texas Tech	10
2	Oklahoma State	8
7	Oklahoma	3

Semifinals; May 27
4	TCU	6	-
5	Kansas State	3	-
6	Texas Tech	1	5
2	Oklahoma State	8	6

Finals; May 28
4	TCU	12
2	Oklahoma State	5

== Schedule ==
Game	Time*	Matchup^{#}	Score	Television
Wednesday, May 24
1	9:00am	No. 4 TCU vs No. 5 Kansas State	16-3^{7}	ESPNU
2	12:30pm	No. 1 Texas vs No. 8 Kansas	3-6	ESPN+
3	4:00pm	No. 2 Oklahoma State vs No. 7 Oklahoma	5-9	ESPN+
4	7:30pm	No. 3 West Virginia vs No. 6 Texas Tech	2-6	ESPN+
Thursday, May 25
5	9:00am	No. 1 Texas vs No. 5 Kansas State	0-6	ESPN+
6	12:30pm	No. 2 Oklahoma State vs No. 3 West Virginia	3-2	ESPN+
7	4:00pm	No. 4 TCU vs No. 8 Kansas	14-4^{8}	ESPNU
8	7:30pm	No. 6 Texas Tech vs No. 7 Oklahoma	10-9	ESPNU
Friday, May 26
9	3:00pm	No. 5 Kansas State vs No. 8 Kansas	7-1	ESPN+
10	6:30pm	No. 2 Oklahoma State vs No. 7 Oklahoma	8-3	ESPN+
Saturday, May 27
11	9:00am	No. 4 TCU vs No. 5 Kansas State	6-3	ESPN+
12	12:30pm	No. 2 Oklahoma State vs No. 6 Texas Tech	8-1	ESPN+
13	4:00pm	No. 2 Oklahoma State vs No. 6 Texas Tech	6-5	ESPN+
Sunday, May 28
14	5:00pm	No. 2 Oklahoma State vs No. 4 TCU	5-12	ESPNU
*Game times in CDT. # – Rankings denote tournament seed.
