= 2023 TCU Horned Frogs baseball team =

College Baseball Season

2023 TCU Horned Frogs baseball

Big 12 tournament champions Fayetteville Regional champions Fort Worth Super Regional champion

College World Series, 2–2
- Conference: Big 12 Conference
- CB: No. 23
- Record: 44–24 (13–11 Big 12)
- Head coach: Kirk Saarloos (2nd as head coach, 11th overall season)
- Assistant coaches: T. J. Bruce (1st season); John DiLaura (5th season); Kyle Winkler (2nd season)
- Home stadium: Lupton Stadium

2023 Big 12 Conference baseball standings
	Conf.				Overall
Team	W		L	PCT	W		L	PCT
No. 14 Texas ‍†‍‍^{y}	15	–	9	.625	42	–	22	.656
Oklahoma State ‍†‍‍^{y}	15	–	9	.625	41	–	20	.672
West Virginia ‍†‍‍^{y}	15	–	9	.625	40	–	20	.667
No. 5 TCU ‍‍‡‍^{y}	13	–	11	.542	44	–	24	.647
Kansas State ‍‍‍	13	–	11	.542	35	–	24	.593
Texas Tech ‍‍‍^{y}	12	–	12	.500	41	–	23	.641
Oklahoma ‍‍‍^{y}	11	–	13	.458	32	–	28	.533
Kansas ‍‍‍	8	–	16	.333	25	–	32	.439
Baylor ‍‍‍	6	–	18	.250	20	–	35	.364
† – Conference champion ‡ – Tournament champion y – Invited to the NCAA tournament As of June 25, 2023; Rankings from D1baseball

The 2023 TCU Horned Frogs baseball team represented Texas Christian University during the 2023 NCAA Division I baseball season. The Horned Frogs played their home games at Lupton Stadium as a member of the Big 12 Conference. They were led by head coach Kirk Saarloos, in his second year as head coach and eleventh season at TCU.

== Previous season ==
The 2022 TCU Horned Frogs baseball team notched a 38-22 (16–8) record. They won the Big 12 regular season championship and advanced to the regionals of the 2022 NCAA tournament.

== Personnel ==
=== Coaching staff ===
Name	Position	Seasons at TCU	Alma mater
Kirk Saarloos	Head coach	11	Cal State Fullerton (2001)
T. J. Bruce	Associate head coach	1	Long Beach State (2004)
John DiLaura	Assistant Coach	5	Michigan (2013)
Kyle Winkler	Volunteer assistant coach	2	TCU

=== Roster ===
2023 TCU Horned Frogs Roster
Pitchers: 3 - Caedmon Parker – Sophomore; 13 - Mason Speaker – Junior; 15 - Sam Stoutenborough – RS Senior; 16 - Luke Savage – Junior; 17 - Kole Klecker – Freshman; 18 - Storm Hierholzer – Junior; 19 - Calvin Marley – Junior; 20 - Cam Brown – Junior; 21 - Garrett Wright – Junior; 25 - Jax Traeger – Freshman; 27 - Hunter Hodges – Junior; 28 - Cohen Feser – Sophomore; 30 - Louis Rodriguez – Freshman; 31 - Justin Hackett – Freshman; 33 - Murphy Brooks – Freshman; 34 - Braeden Sloan – Freshman; 36 - Chase Hoover – Freshman; 44 - River Ridings – Junior; 46 - Ben Abeldt – Freshman; 48 - Ryan Vanderhei – Junior; 49 - Garrett Wright – Freshman	Catchers: 4 - Kurtis Byrne – Junior; 14 - Karson Bowen – Freshman; Infielders: 0 - Tre Richardson – Junior; 5 - Anthony Silva – Freshman; 7 - Gabe Miranda – Freshman; 9 - Brody Green – Sophomore; 12 - David Bishop – Sophomore; 23 - Fisher Ingersoll – Freshman; 32 - Cole Fontenelle – Junior; 35 - Owen Blackledge - Sophomore; 55 - Brayden Taylor – Junior	Outfielders: 1 - Elijah Nunez – Junior; 6 - Luke Boyers – Junior; 10 - Jake Duer – Freshman; 11 - Austin Davis – RS Senior; 22 - Logan Maxwell – Sophomore

== Schedule and results ==
2023 TCU Horned Frogs baseball game log
Regular season (33–22)
February (5–3)

Date	Time (CT)	TV	Opponent	Rank	Stadium	Score	Win	Loss	Save	Attendance	Overall	Big 12	
Feb 17	3:00 pm	FloSports	vs. No. 10 Vanderbilt*	No. 15	Globe Life Field; Arlington, TX	**W** 11–4	**Savage** (1–0)	Hliboki (0–1)	—	15,721	1–0	—	Stats; Story
Feb 18	7:00 pm	FloSports	vs. No. 8 Arkansas*	No. 15	Globe Life Field; Arlington, TX	**W** 18–6	**Klecker** (1–0)	Morris (0–1)	—	20,295	2–0	—	Stats; Story
Feb 19	6:30 pm	FloSports	vs. Missouri*	No. 15	Globe Life Field; Arlington, TX	**L** 8–9^{(10)}	Franklin (1–0)	**Wright** (0–1)	—	16,100	2-1	—	Stats; Story
Feb 22	6:00 pm		UT Arlington*	No. 8	Lupton Stadium; Fort Worth, TX	**W** 7–3	**Rodriguez** (1–0)	Brooks (0–1)	—	3,897	3-1	—	Stats; Story
Feb 24	6:30 pm	ESPN+	vs. Florida State*	No. 8	Lupton Stadium; Fort Worth, TX	**L** 1–10	Baumeister (1–0)	**Vanderhei** (0–1)	Crowell (1)	4,902	3-2	—	Stats; Story
Feb 25	2:00 pm	ESPN+	vs. Florida State*	No. 8	Lupton Stadium; Fort Worth, TX	**L** 8–10	Whittaker (2–0)	**Savage** (0–1)	Armstrong (1)	4,090	3-3	—	Stats; Story
Feb 26	1:00 pm	ESPN+	vs. Florida State*	No. 8	Lupton Stadium; Fort Worth, TX	**W** 3–2	**Klecker** (2–0)	Armstrong (0–1)	—	4,176	4-3	—	Stats; Story
Feb 28	6:30 pm		at Dallas Baptist*	No. 10	Horner Ballpark; Dallas, TX	**W** 4–1^{(12)}	**Abeldt** (1–0)	Russell (0–1)	**Feser** (1)	1,737	5-3	—	Stats; Story

March (11–7)

Date	Time (CT)	TV	Opponent	Rank	Stadium	Score	Win	Loss	Save	Attendance	Overall	Big 12	
Mar 3	3:00 pm	AT&T SportsNet	vs. Michigan*	No. 10	Minute Maid Park; Houston, TX	**W** 6–0	**Vanderhei** (1–1)	O'Halloran (2–1)	**Savage** (1)	1,250	6-3	—	Stats; Story
Mar 4	3:00 pm	AT&T SportsNet	vs. No. 14 Louisville*	No. 10	Minute Maid Park; Houston, TX	**L** 2–3	Farone (1–0)	**Klecker** (2–1)	Kuehner (1)		6-4	—	Stats; Story
Mar 5	3:00 pm	AT&T SportsNet	vs. Rice*	No. 10	Minute Maid Park; Houston, TX	**W** 7-0	**Brown** (1–0)	Vincent (1–1)	—		7-4	—	Stats; Story
Mar 7	6:00 pm	ESPN+	vs. UT Arlington*	No. 10	Lupton Stadium; Fort Worth, TX	**L** 7–8	Gray (1–0)	**Sloan** (0–1)	Peters (4)	3,832	7-5	—	Stats; Story
Mar 10	6:30 pm	ESPN+	vs. San Diego*	No. 10	Lupton Stadium; Fort Worth, TX	**L** 2–14	Sashin (1–0)	**Vanderhei** (1–2)	—	3,847	7-6	—	
Mar 11	2:00 pm	ESPN+	vs. San Diego*	No. 10	Lupton Stadium; Fort Worth, TX							—	
Mar 12	1:00 pm	ESPN+	vs. San Diego*	No. 10	Lupton Stadium; Fort Worth, TX							—	
Mar 14	6:00 pm	ESPN+	at Texas State*		Bobcat Ballpark; San Marcos, TX							—	
Mar 17	6:00 pm		at Oklahoma		L. Dale Mitchell Baseball Park; Norman, OK								
Mar 18	4:00 pm		at Oklahoma		L. Dale Mitchell Baseball Park; Norman, OK								
Mar 19	2:00 pm		at Oklahoma		L. Dale Mitchell Baseball Park; Norman, OK								
Mar 21	6:00 pm	ESPN+	vs. Abilene Christian*		Lupton Stadium; Fort Worth, TX							—	
Mar 22	6:00 pm	ESPN+	vs. Northwestern*		Lupton Stadium; Fort Worth, TX							—	
Mar 24	6:30 pm	ESPN+	vs. Kansas		Lupton Stadium; Fort Worth, TX								
Mar 25	2:00 pm	ESPN+	vs. Kansas		Lupton Stadium; Fort Worth, TX								
Mar 26	1:00 pm	ESPN+	vs. Kansas		Lupton Stadium; Fort Worth, TX								
Mar 28	6:30 pm	ESPN+	at UT Arlington*		Clay Gould Ballpark; Arlington, TX							—	
Mar 31	6:30 pm	ESPN+	at Texas Tech		Dan Law Field; Lubbock, TX								

April (7–10)

Date	Time (CT)	TV	Opponent	Rank	Stadium	Score	Win	Loss	Save	Attendance	Overall	Big 12
Apr 1	2:00 pm	ESPN+	at Texas Tech		Dan Law Field; Lubbock, TX							
Apr 2	2:00 pm	ESPN+	at Texas Tech		Dan Law Field; Lubbock, TX							
Apr 4	6:30 pm	ESPN+	at Tarleton State*		Cecil Ballow Baseball Complex; Stephenville, TX							—
Apr 6	6:30 pm	ESPN+	vs. Oklahoma State		Lupton Stadium; Fort Worth, TX							
Apr 7	8:00 pm	ESPNU	vs. Oklahoma State		Lupton Stadium; Fort Worth, TX							
Apr 8	4:00 pm	ESPN+	vs. Oklahoma State		Lupton Stadium; Fort Worth, TX							
Apr 11	6:30 pm	ESPN+	at Abilene Christian*		Crutcher Scott Field; Abilene, TX							—
Apr 14	5:00 pm	ESPN+	vs. UNC Wilmington*		Lupton Stadium; Fort Worth, TX							—
Apr 15	4:00 pm	ESPN+	vs. UNC Wilmington*		Lupton Stadium; Fort Worth, TX							—
Apr 16	1:00 pm	ESPN+	vs. UNC Wilmington*		Lupton Stadium; Fort Worth, TX							—
Apr 18	6:00 pm	ESPN+	vs. Lamar*		Lupton Stadium; Fort Worth, TX							—
Apr 21	5:30 pm		at West Virginia		Monongalia County Ballpark; Granville, WV							
Apr 22	3:00 pm		at West Virginia		Monongalia County Ballpark; Granville, WV							
Apr 23	12:00 pm		at West Virginia		Monongalia County Ballpark; Granville, WV							
Apr 25	6:00 pm	ESPN+	vs. Dallas Baptist*		Lupton Stadium; Fort Worth, TX							—
Apr 28	6:00 pm	ESPNU	vs. Texas		Lupton Stadium; Fort Worth, TX							
Apr 29	6:00 pm	ESPNU	vs. Texas		Lupton Stadium; Fort Worth, TX							
Apr 30	1:00 pm	ESPN+	vs. Texas		Lupton Stadium; Fort Worth, TX							

May (10–2)

Date	Time (CT)	TV	Opponent	Rank	Stadium	Score	Win	Loss	Save	Attendance	Overall	Big 12
May 2	6:00 pm	ESPN+	vs. UT-Rio Grande Valley*		Lupton Stadium; Fort Worth, TX							—
May 5	6:30 pm	ESPN+	vs. Cal State Fullerton*		Lupton Stadium; Fort Worth, TX							—
May 6	4:00 pm	ESPN+	vs. Cal State Fullerton*		Lupton Stadium; Fort Worth, TX							—
May 7	1:00 pm	ESPN+	vs. Cal State Fullerton*		Lupton Stadium; Fort Worth, TX							—
May 12	6:30 pm	ESPN+	vs. Baylor		Lupton Stadium; Fort Worth, TX							
May 13	4:00 pm	ESPN+	vs. Baylor		Lupton Stadium; Fort Worth, TX							
May 14	1:00 pm	ESPN+	vs. Baylor		Lupton Stadium; Fort Worth, TX							
May 16	6:00 pm	ESPN+	vs. Texas State*		Lupton Stadium; Fort Worth, TX							—
May 18	6:00 pm	ESPN+	at Kansas State		Tointon Family Stadium; Manhattan, KS							
May 19	6:00 pm	ESPN+	at Kansas State		Tointon Family Stadium; Manhattan, KS							
May 20	4:00 pm	ESPN+	at Kansas State		Tointon Family Stadium; Manhattan, KS							

Postseason (11–2)

Big 12 Tournament (4–0)
Date	Time (CT)	TV	Opponent	Seed	Stadium	Score	Win	Loss	Save	Attendance	Overall record	Tournament record	Notes
May 24	9:00 am	ESPNU	vs. (5) Kansas State	(4)	Globe Life Field; Arlington, TX	**W** 16–3^{(7)}	**Traeger** (1-0)	Boerema (7–2)	—	—	34–22	1–0	Stats; Story
May 25	4:00 pm	ESPNU	vs. (8) Kansas	(4)	Globe Life Field; Arlington, TX	**W** 14–4^{(8)}	**Savage** (3-3)	Cranton (3-4)	—	—	35–22	2–0	Stats; Story
May 27	9:00 am	ESPN+	vs. (5) Kansas State	(4)	Globe Life Field; Arlington, TX	**W** 6–3	**Abeldt** (2-3)	Rothermel (1-3)	—	—	36–22	3–0	Stats; Story
May 28	5:00 pm	ESPN2	vs. (2) No. 18 Oklahoma State	(4)	Globe Life Field; Arlington, TX	**W** 12–5	**Savage** (4-3)	Abram (8-3)	—	14,673	37–22	4–0	Stats; Story

NCAA Fayetteville Regional (3–0)
Date	Time (CT)	TV	Opponent	Seed	Stadium	Score	Win	Loss	Save	Attendance	Overall record	Regional Record	Notes
June 2	7:00 pm	ESPNU	vs. (3) Arizona	(2) No. 17	Baum–Walker Stadium; Fayetteville, AR	**W** 12–4	**Savage** (5-3)	Walty (5-1)	—	10,348	38–22	1–0	Stats; Story
June 3	7:00 pm	ESPNU	vs. (1) No. 5 Arkansas	(2) No. 17	Baum-Walker Stadium; Fayetteville, AR	**Postponed due to weather to June 4**							Story
June 4	1:00 pm	SEC Network/ESPN+	vs. (1) No. 5 Arkansas	(2) No. 17	Baum-Walker Stadium; Fayetteville, AR	**W** 20–5	**Stoutenborough** (4-0)	Smith (8-2)	—	11,121	39–22	2–0	Stats; Story
June 5	1:00 pm	ESPN+	vs. (1) No. 5 Arkansas	(2) No. 17	Baum-Walker Stadium; Fayetteville, AR	**W** 12–4	**Abeldt** (3-3)	Morris (1-4)	—	10,475	40–22	3–0	Stats; Story

NCAA Fort Worth Super Regional (2–0)
Date	Time (CT)	TV	Opponent	Seed	Stadium	Score	Win	Loss	Save	Attendance	Overall record	Super Regional Record	Notes
June 9	4:00 pm	ESPNU	vs. Indiana State		Lupton Stadium; Fort Worth, TX	**W** 4–1	**Klecker** (10-4)	Jachec (7-4)	**Savage** (2)	8,812	41-22	1-0	
June 10	7:00 pm	ESPNU	vs. Indiana State		Lupton Stadium; Fort Worth, TX	**W** 6–4	**Stoutenborough** (5-0)	Fenlong (10-3)	**Wright** (5)	8,994	42-22	2-0	

NCAA College World Series (2–2)
Date	Time (CT)	TV	Opponent	Seed	Stadium	Score	Win	Loss	Save	Attendance	Overall record	CWS Record	Notes
June 16	1:00 pm	ESPN	vs. Oral Roberts		Charles Schwab Field Omaha; Omaha, NE	**L** 5–6	Denton (3–1)	**Savage** (5–4)	—	24,134	42-23	0–1	
June 18	1:00 pm	ESPN	vs. No. 7 Virginia		Charles Schwab Field Omaha; Omaha, NE	**W** 4–3	**Wright** (3–2)	Early (12–3)	**Abeldt** (2)	24,479	43–23	1–1	
June 20	1:00 pm	ESPN	vs. Oral Roberts		Charles Schwab Field Omaha; Omaha, NE	**W** 6–1	**Savage** (6–4)	Fowler (9–2)	—	23,496	44–23	2–1	
June 21	1:00 pm	ESPN	vs. No. 2 Florida		Charles Schwab Field Omaha; Omaha, NE	**L** 3–2	Neely (2–2)	**Abeldt** (3–4)	—	23,889	44–24	2–2	

Legend: = Win = Loss = Canceled Bold = TCU team member
"*" indicates a non-conference game.
"#" represents ranking. All rankings from D1Baseball on the date of the contest.
"()" represents postseason seeding in the Big 12 Tournament or NCAA regional, respectively.

== Rankings ==
Ranking movements Legend: ██ Increase in ranking ██ Decrease in ranking — = Not ranked
	Week																		
Poll	Pre	1	2	3	4	5	6	7	8	9	10	11	12	13	14	15	16	17	Final
Coaches'	17	17*	17	16	18	—	—	—	—	—	—	—	—	—	—	—			
Baseball America	14	10	11	10	13	—	—	—	23	—	—	—	—	—	—	24			
Collegiate Baseball^	15	12	20	23	—	—	—	—	17	19	—	—	—	—	—	23			
NCBWA†	16	8	12	13	16	30	27	—	17	—	—	—	—	—	—	28			
D1Baseball	15	8	10	10	11	—	—	—	25	—	—	—	—	—	—	17			

^ Collegiate Baseball ranked 40 teams in their preseason poll, but only ranked 30 teams weekly during the season.
† NCBWA ranks 30 teams in their preseason poll, but only ranks 25 teams weekly during the season.
* A new poll was not released for this week, so for comparison purposes, the previous week's ranking is inserted in this week's slot.
