= State Farm College Baseball Showdown =

College Baseball Tournament

College Baseball Showdown
- Sport: College baseball
- Founded: 2021
- No. of teams: 6
- Venue: Globe Life Field
- Broadcaster: FloSports
- Website: https://www.mlb.com/rangers/tickets/events/college-baseball-showdown

The State Farm College Baseball Showdown is an annual six-team college baseball tournament held in Arlington, Texas and hosted by the Rangers Foundation at Globe Life Field.

== Competitors ==
Year	Teams					
2021	Arkansas	Mississippi State	Ole Miss	Texas	TCU	Texas Tech
2022	Arizona	Auburn	Kansas State	Michigan	Oklahoma	Texas Tech
2023	Arkansas	Missouri	Oklahoma State	TCU	Texas	Vanderbilt

== Teams by number of appearances ==
Team	Appearances	Years
Texas Tech	2	2021, 2022
Arkansas	2	2021, 2023
Arizona	1	2022
Auburn	1	2022
Kansas State	1	2022
Michigan	1	2022
Missouri	1	2023
Mississippi State	1	2021
Ole Miss	1	2021
Oklahoma	1	2022
Oklahoma State	1	2023
Texas	2	2021, 2023
TCU	2	2021, 2023
Vanderbilt	1	2023

== See also ==
- Shriners College Classic
