= Clabo =

Clabo is a surname. Notable people with the surname include:

- Neil Clabo (1952–2024), American football player
- Tyson Clabo (born 1981), American football player
