= Sisk =

Sisk is an Irish surname and has been found in East Cork since the 18th century. A modern version of the medieval surname Saghas of County Kildare.

The earliest form of Sisk is found in Tenby, Wales in 1405. Sayse, from Sais, a sobriquet meaning "Saxon".

People with the surname include:

- B. F. Sisk, (1910–95) American Congressman
- Doug Sisk (born 1957) Major League baseball player
- Howard Sisk (c.1930–2001) aka "Curly Howard", American radio disc jockey
- Jerry Sisk, Jr. (1953–2013) American gemologist and co-founder of Jewelry Television
- John Sisk, (1837–1921) Irish builder, founder of the Sisk Group
- John Sisk, Jr. (born 1941) American football player
- Johnny Sisk (1906–1986) American football player
- Laura Wright née Laura Sisk (born 1970) American actress
- Mark Sisk, (born 1942) Episcopal Bishop of New York
- Mildred Gillars née Mildred Sisk (1900–88), nicknamed "Axis Sally", American broadcaster in Nazi Germany
- Tommie Sisk (born 1942) Major League baseball player
- Pieter Sisk (born 1999) Belgian runner
