= Battle of Campbell's Station =

1863 battle of the American Civil War

- Part of the American Civil War
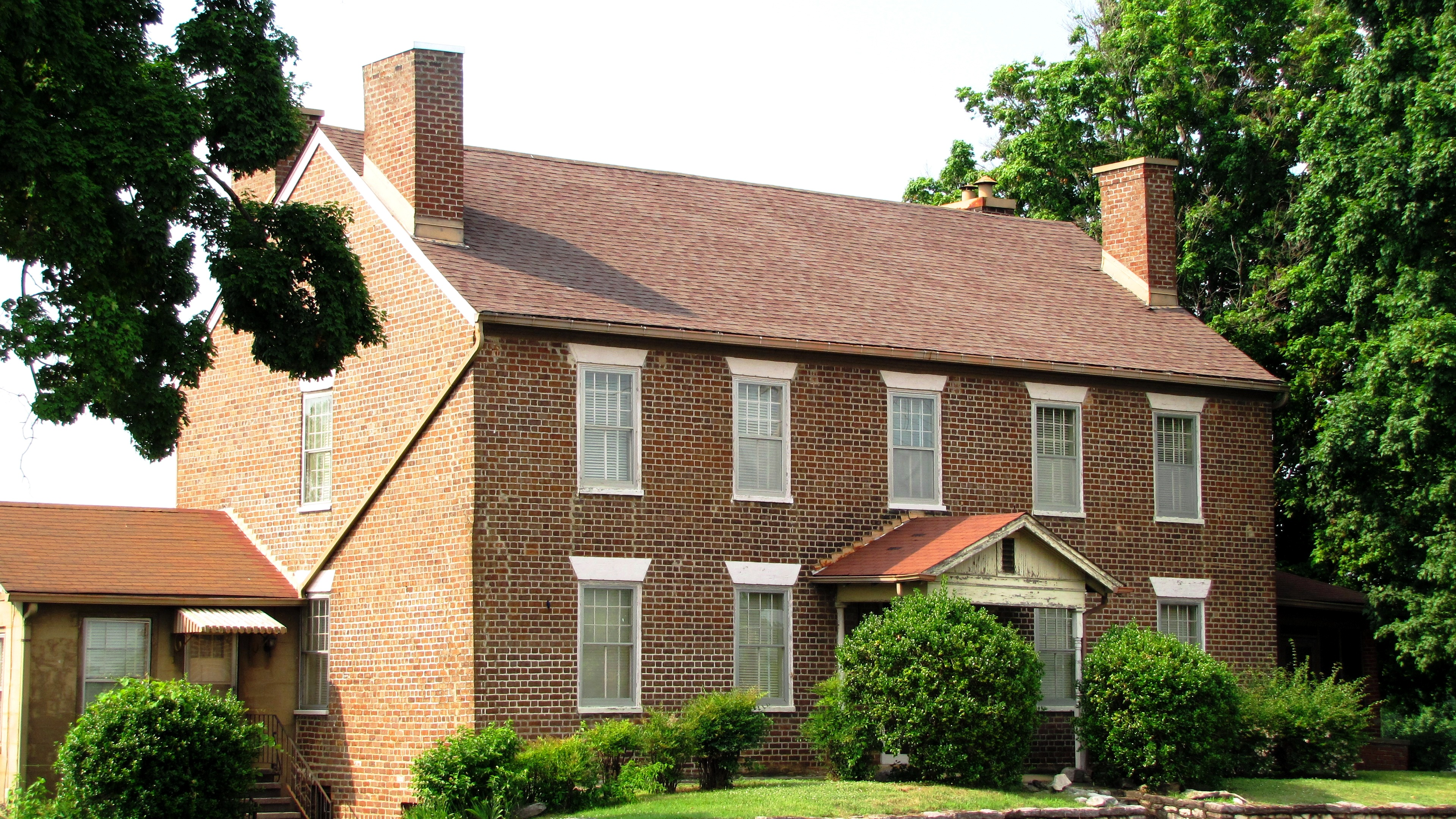
- The Avery Russell House, built in 1835, stands on the Campbell's Station battlefield.
Date	November 16, 1863
Location	Farragut, Tennessee 35.8846°N 84.1539°W
Result	Union victory

Belligerents
United States (Union)	Confederate States of America

Commanders and leaders
Ambrose Burnside	James Longstreet

Units involved
Army of the Ohio	Confederate Forces in East Tennessee

Strength
9,000	12,000

Casualties and losses
400–438	570
- Location of battle. Campbell's Station (the United States)

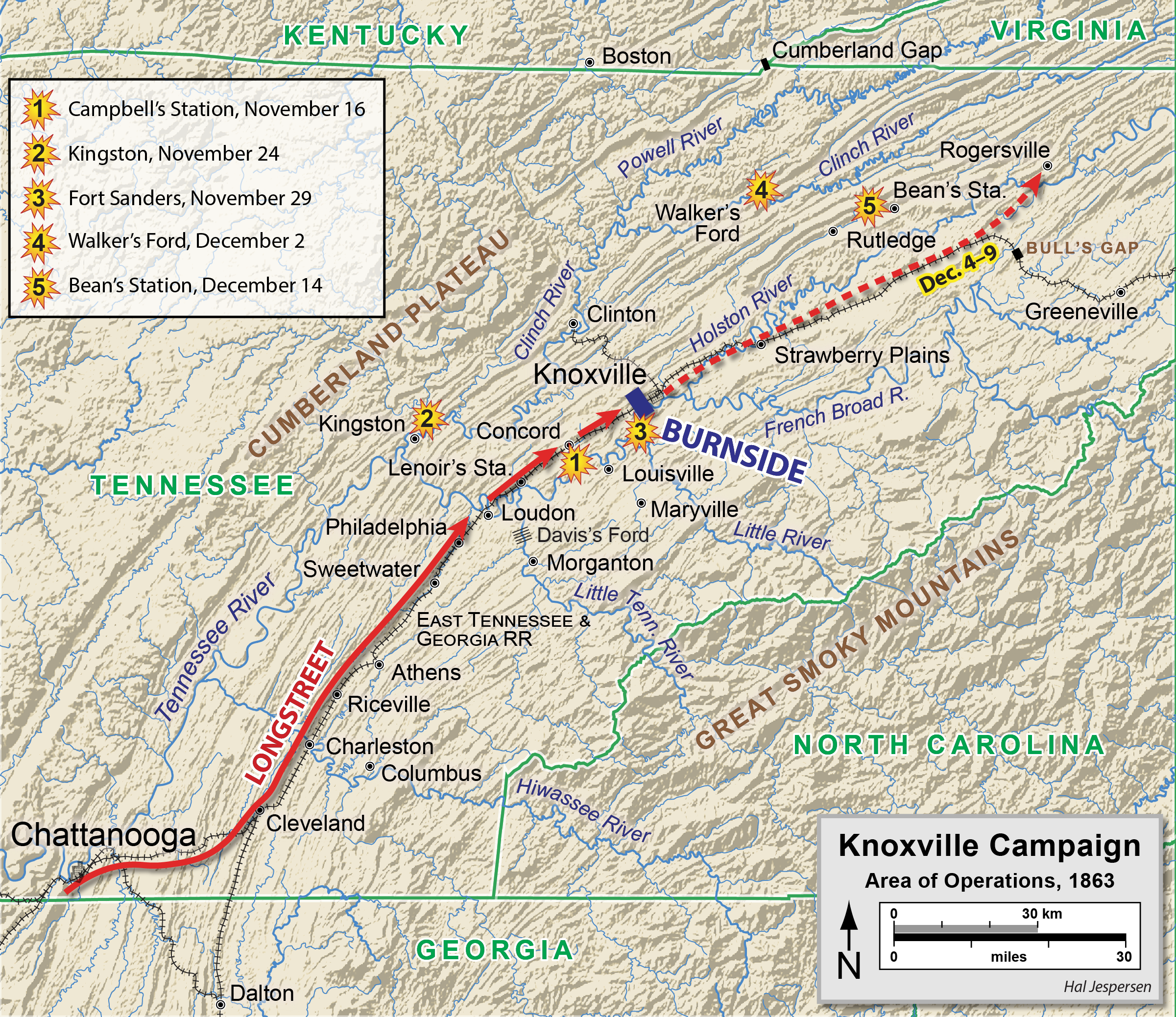
Campbell's Station is a short distance northwest of Concord.

The Battle of Campbell's Station (November 16, 1863) saw Confederate forces under Lieutenant General James Longstreet attack Union troops led by Major General Ambrose Burnside at Campbell's Station (now Farragut), Knox County, Tennessee, during the Knoxville Campaign of the American Civil War. Longstreet hoped to crush the Union Army of the Ohio forces before they could retreat to Knoxville. During the fighting, the Confederates forced the Union troops to fall back from five separate positions. However, the final result was that Burnside's troops conducted a successful fighting withdrawal.

Longstreet's two infantry divisions, supported by 5,000 cavalry, were detached from General Braxton Bragg's army with the goal of defeating Burnside's forces and recapturing Knoxville. The only reasonable way to accomplish this was to overwhelm the Union troops before they could take refuge behind the defenses of Knoxville. The failure to trap Burnside at Campbell's Station meant that Longstreet was compelled to besiege Union forces within Knoxville. Ultimately, the Siege of Knoxville failed when major Union forces were sent to relieve Burnside and Longstreet was forced to retreat northeast toward Virginia.

== Background ==
=== Union occupation ===
Burnside, commander of the Union Army of the Ohio, launched the Union invasion of East Tennessee in late August 1863, using two infantry divisions and cavalry from the XXIII Corps troops stationed in Kentucky. The operation was largely unopposed and Federal troops occupied Knoxville on September 1. Many of the inhabitants of East Tennessee were pro-Union and welcomed the Federals. By mid-September, Burnside's troops had gained control over much of East Tennessee. The strategic situation turned in favor of the Confederacy when Bragg's Army of Tennessee defeated the Union Army of the Cumberland at the Battle of Chickamauga on September 19–20, 1863. After his victory, Bragg effectively blockaded the Army of the Cumberland in Chattanooga.

Two divisions of IX Corps joined Burnside on September 20, and Brigadier General Orlando B. Willcox with 3,000 6-month Indiana soldiers reached at Cumberland Gap on October 3. Burnside's returns for October 1863 reported the following troops present for duty: 6,352 officers and enlisted men in IX Corps, 7,912 infantry and artillery and 7,458 cavalry in XXIII Corps, and 4,391 troops in the Left Wing. Brigadier General Robert B. Potter led IX Corps, Brigadier General Mahlon D. Manson commanded XXIII Corps, and Brigadier General James M. Shackelford directed the cavalry. Willcox commanded the Left Wing.

Off to the northeast hovered Major General Robert Ransom Jr. with 5,800 Confederate infantry plus two cavalry brigades under Brigadier General William E. Jones and Colonel H. L. Giltner. Yet, the Confederate department commander Major General Samuel Jones felt that his 8,000 troops were too weak to challenge the Union occupation. On October 17, Bragg sent an infantry division under Major General Carter L. Stevenson and two cavalry brigades under Colonels George Gibbs Dibrell and J. J. Morrison to threaten the southern part of the Union area of control. On October 20, the cavalry defeated a Union cavalry brigade under Colonel Frank Wolford in the Battle of Philadelphia. This setback compelled Burnside to abandon Loudon and fall back behind the Tennessee and Little Tennessee Rivers.

Burnside concentrated the 6,000 men from IX Corps and 3,000 soldiers from Brigadier General Julius White's XXIII Corps infantry division in the area near Lenoir's Station. The remaining XXIII Corps infantry division under Brigadier General Milo Smith Hascall held Knoxville, Brigadier General William P. Sanders' cavalry division watched the area near Maryville, Willcox defended Bull's Gap, and two infantry regiments and 300 cavalry garrisoned Cumberland Gap. Major General Ulysses S. Grant worried whether Burnside was capable of holding Knoxville.

=== Longstreet's offensive ===
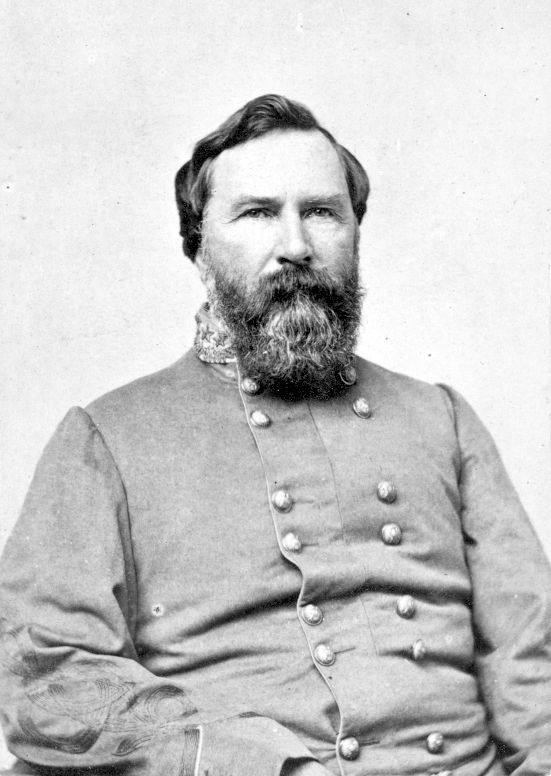
James Longstreet

On November 4, Bragg ordered Longstreet to detach his two divisions from the Army of Tennessee and use them to recapture Knoxville. Bragg was critical of Longstreet's mishandling of the Battle of Wauhatchie on October 28, in which the Confederates failed to cut the Federals' newly established Cracker Line. Also, Bragg was anxious to get rid of a general whom he regarded as a troublemaker. Longstreet wanted to be reinforced to 20,000 men for the campaign, but Bragg refused and recalled both Stevenson's and Benjamin F. Cheatham's infantry divisions that had been sent to oppose Burnside. Longstreet tried to obtain accurate maps of East Tennessee but was only able to get poor ones. Moving Longstreet's two divisions north, while Stevenson's and Cheatham's divisions moved south overtaxed the old railroad equipment, and the transfer took until November 13 to complete. Longstreet belatedly discovered that Stevenson's troops had stripped the countryside of food supplies and that his own wagon train was barely adequate to maintain an offensive. Longstreet had 10,000 infantry, 5,000 cavalry, and 35 guns after Bragg agreed to loan him Major General Joseph Wheeler and almost all of his army's mounted force.

Longstreet's staff selected Hough's Ferry, a short distance west of Loudon, as the most suitable location for a pontoon bridge across the Tennessee River. Longstreet ordered the division of Brigadier General Micah Jenkins to cross the pontoon bridge, while Major General Lafayette McLaws' division marched northeast to distract the attention of Union forces away from the bridge. Meanwhile, Wheeler and most of the cavalry would try to seize Knoxville from the south. On the evening of November 13, the Palmetto Sharpshooters from Colonel John Bratton's South Carolina brigade crossed the Tennessee at Hough's Ferry and secured the bridge site. The usable, but somewhat rickety span was completed by the morning of November 14. At the same time, McLaws' division arrived at Loudon, after marching from Morganton. White, who had one brigade at Kingston and one brigade at Lenoir's Station, sent one infantry regiment and a section of artillery to keep an eye on the bridge.

== Lenoir's Station ==
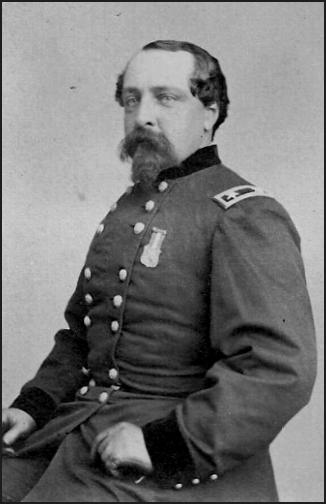
Edward Ferrero

Chestnut Ridge started near Hough's Ferry and ran to the northeast. On its northern side, the Hotchkiss Valley Road ran from the ferry northeast to Burns House, where there was a gap in the ridge. A road passed south through the gap to Lenoir's Station on the railroad. Going north from Burns House, the road intersected the Kingston Road, which ran from Kingston to Knoxville. The railroad and the parallel main road on the south side of Chestnut Ridge ran from Loudon northeast to Knoxville. There was also a road across Chestnut Ridge near its southwestern end.

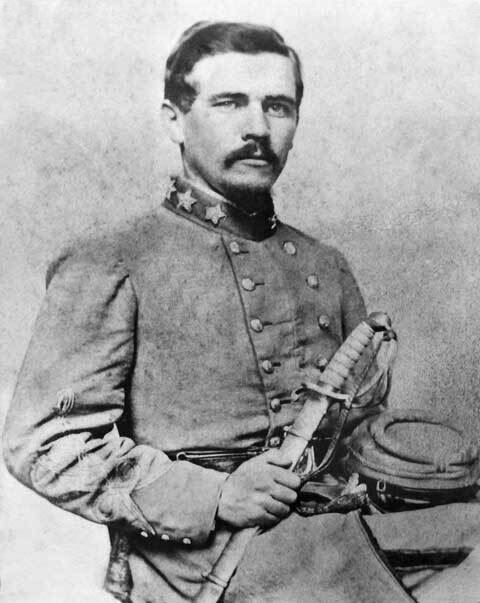
Micah Jenkins

It took all day on November 14 for Jenkins' division to cross the pontoon bridge. Burnside, who arrived at the scene, ordered Colonel Marshall W. Chapin's brigade of White's division to probe Confederate forces at Hough's Ferry. This operation was supported by Brigadier General Edward Ferrero's IX Corps division. Chapin passed through the gap and marched southwest down the Hotchkiss Valley Road. Late in the day, Chapin's brigade pressed against the Confederate bridgehead until nightfall, sustaining 47 casualties. Ferrero's troops were not engaged. During the day, Colonel John F. Hartranft's IX Corps division remained at Lenoir's. Colonel Samuel R. Mott's brigade of White's division and Colonel Robert K. Byrd's 1st Tennessee Mounted Infantry were posted at Kingston; they would be bypassed by Longstreet's advance and remain isolated there during the campaign. Burnside had 9,000 troops available, including only four companies of cavalry. The bulk of Burnside's substantial cavalry force was deployed elsewhere. Longstreet led 12,000 troops, including one brigade of cavalry.

On the morning of November 15, Longstreet mounted his attack against Burnside's Federals. The Confederate commander ordered Jenkins' division and Colonel John R. Hart's cavalry brigade to advance while McLaws' division crossed the pontoon bridge. In the face of this thrust, Chapin's brigade and Ferrero's division retreated across Chestnut Ridge by the road at its southwestern end. Chapin's brigade lost 13 casualties in a skirmish with pursuing Confederates. Chapin and Ferrero reached Lenoir's at 1:00 pm, taking nine hours to march 6 mi (9.7 km) because a violent rainstorm in the night had turned the roads to quagmires. Meanwhile, Jenkins' division marched 9 mi (14.5 km) northeast on the Hotchkiss Valley Road. At Burns House, Jenkins turned south before encountering Ferrero's division and Chapin's brigade posted 0.75 mi (1.2 km) south of the gap.

In the evening of November 15, Burnside began moving his forces northeast toward Knoxville. He ordered the four companies of the 6th Indiana Cavalry Regiment and Lieutenant Erskine Gittings' Battery L and M, 3rd US Artillery to withdraw to the key intersection of the Lenoir and Kingston Roads. These units were soon followed by Hartranft's infantry division and two artillery batteries. All these units were slowed by the muddy roads. The leading elements of McLaws' division reached the Burns House where Longstreet ordered McLaws to camp for the night. Longstreet hoped to cut off Burnside's retreat toward Knoxville, but he was handicapped by a lack of reliable maps of the area. Longstreet later claimed that he was misled by his guide, but darkness had fallen and that prevented effective reconnaissance. Soldiers on both sides suffered from a sudden drop of night-time temperature.

Union casualties at Lenoir's Station
Division	Brigade	Unit	Killed	Wounded	Missing
Headquarters	Not brigaded	6th Indiana Cavalry Regiment: Col. James Biddle	0	0	4
1st Division, IX Corps; Brig. Gen. Edward Ferrero	1st Brigade; Col. David Morrison	45th Pennsylvania Infantry Regiment: Lt. Col. Francis M. Hills	0	1	0
2nd Division, XXIII Corps; Brig. Gen. Julius White	2nd Brigade; Col. Marshall W. Chapin	107th Illinois Infantry Regiment: Lt. Col. Francis H. Lowry	1	1	0
2nd Division, XXIII Corps; Brig. Gen. Julius White	2nd Brigade; Col. Marshall W. Chapin	13th Kentucky Infantry Regiment: Col. William E. Hobson	4	39	0
2nd Division, XXIII Corps; Brig. Gen. Julius White	2nd Brigade; Col. Marshall W. Chapin	111th Ohio Infantry Regiment: Maj. Isaac R. Sherwood	1	14	55
-	-	Totals	6	55	59

== Wheeler's strike ==
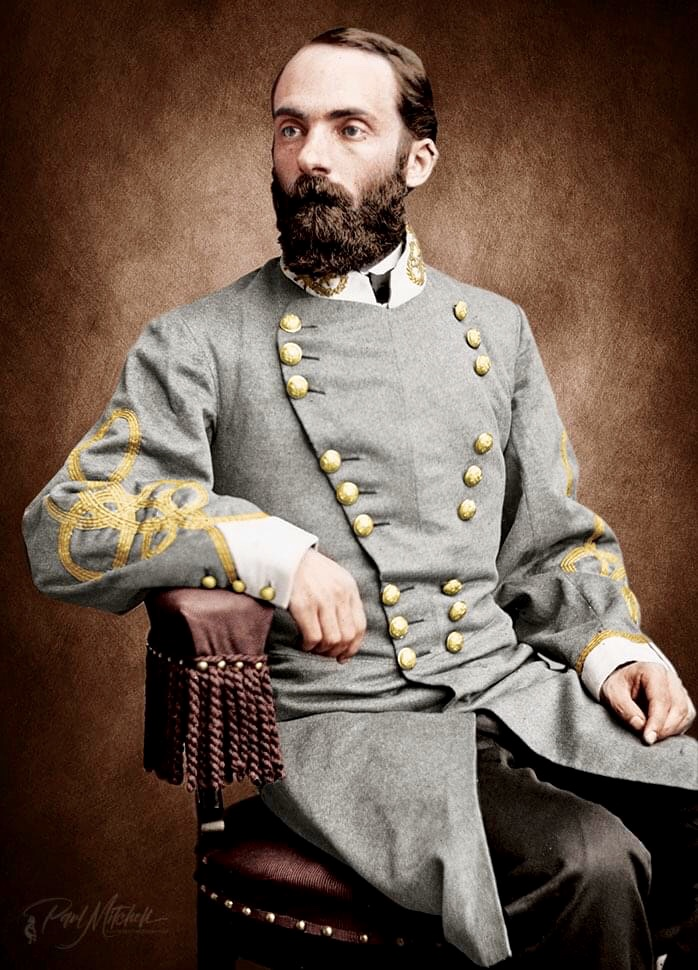
Joseph Wheeler

Wheeler arrived at Sweetwater on November 11 with four cavalry brigades. Longstreet ordered Wheeler to begin the operation against the south side of Knoxville at dawn on November 13. He hoped Burnside's focus would be on the north bank of the Tennessee River. Nevertheless, Longstreet made Wheeler aware that a strong Union cavalry force was opposing him. By the evening of November 13, Wheeler's horsemen crossed the Little Tennessee River at Motley's Ford, southeast of Morganton. Hoping to trap Union cavalry at Maryville, Wheeler sent Brigadier General Frank Crawford Armstrong's division circling to the north of that town while Brigadier General William T. Martin's division struck the town from the west. In the event, the Union brigade under Colonel Charles D. Pennebaker had withdrawn behind the Little River to Rockford, leaving only the 11th Kentucky Mounted Infantry in Maryville. Armstrong established a blocking position, but most of the 11th Kentucky escaped the trap thanks to a providential rainstorm.

Next, Armstrong sent Colonel Thomas Harrison's brigade to attack the 1st Kentucky Cavalry and 45th Ohio Mounted Infantry Regiments, which were 2 mi (3.2 km) southwest of Rockford. Harrison's troopers overwhelmed the two regiments, driving them back to Rockford. Quickly finding places to cross the Little River, the Confederates compelled Sanders to abandon Rockford and form a new defense line behind Stock Creek, 2 mi (3.2 km) north. Wheeler sent Martin's division to cross upstream and outflank Sanders' line while Armstrong applied pressure in front. By evening on November 15, Wheeler's Confederates drove Sanders' cavalry within the defenses on the south side of Knoxville. That evening and the next morning, Wheeler's cavalry was stopped by Colonel Daniel Cameron's infantry brigade of Hascall's division. On November 16, Longstreet urgently asked Wheeler to join him, so Wheeler crossed to the north bank of the Tennessee River at Louisville. By that time, it was too late to help Longstreet cut off Burnside's retreat.

Wheeler claimed to have captured 300 Union soldiers for the loss of 57 men. On November 14 at the clash south of Rockford, the 1st Kentucky lost 1 killed, 4 wounded, and 37 captured, while the 45th Ohio lost 2 wounded and 5 captured, for a total of 49 casualties. On November 15–16 on the south side of Knoxville, the Union cavalry suffered 101 casualties. The 11th Kentucky lost 1 wounded and 3 captured, the 27th Kentucky Mounted Infantry lost 3 killed, and the 45th Ohio lost 3 killed, 8 wounded, and 83 captured.

== Battle ==
=== Morning ===
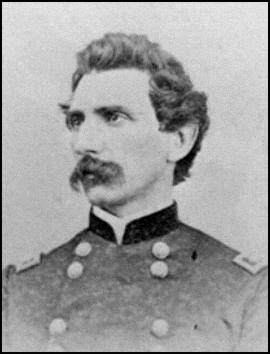
John Hartranft

Burnside decided to abandon Lenoir's Station during the night in order to reach Campbell's Station. At 7 pm, he sent away most of his artillery, but the roads were so deep in mud that mule teams had to help drag the guns. Meanwhile, the Union troops destroyed the remaining supplies at Lenoir's before following the others at dawn. Colonel William Humphrey's brigade of Ferrero's division and one section of Captain Jacob Roemer's Battery L, 2nd New York Artillery formed the rearguard. Since one of its regiments was guarding the wagon train, Humphrey's brigade was only 700-strong. One of Chapin's companies never got the order to retire and its soldiers were captured. Longstreet ordered Jenkins' division to follow the Federal retreat, a distance of 12 mi (19.3 km) to Campbell's Station. Hart's cavalry brigade and McLaws' division moved north from Burns House to the Kingston Road and then turned east, a distance of 10 mi (16.1 km). During the retreat, Bratton's Confederate brigade continually pressed the Humphrey's rearguard.

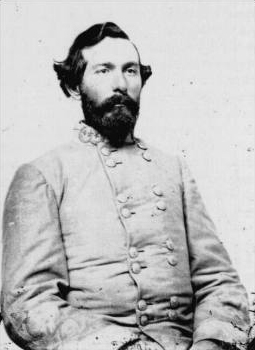
G. T. Anderson

Campbell's Station was a hamlet located where the Concord Road, from the south, intersected the Kingston Road (now called Kingston Pike). Harranft's division reached the fork where the Lenoir Road joined the Kingston Road, which was 1 mi (1.6 km) west of Campbell's Station and a shorter distance west of the Avery Russell House. Hartranft sent the 200 horsemen of Colonel James Biddle's 6th Indiana Cavalry west on the Kingston Road and deployed his infantry division to cover the intersection. Biddle's troopers went 2.5 mi (4.0 km) before they bumped into Hart's Confederate brigade and fell back skirmishing. At 9:30 am on November 16, Humphrey's three Michigan regiments made the first Federal stand at Little Turkey Creek, 1.7 mi (2.7 km) south of the fork. After being outflanked by Bratton, Humphrey's brigade withdrew north to a hill to make the second Federal stand.

Humphrey's brigade held a fence line for about a half hour before retreating to Hartranft's position at the fork in the roads. During the second stand, Colonel Huntington Smith of the 20th Michigan Infantry Regiment was killed by a bullet in his head. Humphrey withdrew after launching a brief charge to drive back Bratton's lines. At the third Federal stand, Humphrey's brigade formed on the left of Colonel David Morrison's brigade of Ferrero's division. Soon afterward, Potter ordered Hartranft's division and Biddle's cavalry to withdraw behind Turkey Creek, 0.75 mi (1.2 km) east. By this time, Burnside's wagon trains safely passed the fork and were heading east on the Kingston Road. White already placed Chapin's brigade in the new position. Jenkins sent Bratton's brigade to the left and Brigadier General George T. Anderson's brigade to the right. As Anderson's brigade threatened to turn Humphrey's left flank, the 36th Massachusetts and 8th Michigan Infantry Regiments of Morrison's brigade pulled out from their position on the right and moved to the left flank. The two regiments fired into Anderson's men, stopping them, then hustled back to the right flank in time to stop Bratton's brigade. Humphrey's and Morrison's men went to the rear at the double-quick and escaped the attempted envelopment.

=== Afternoon ===
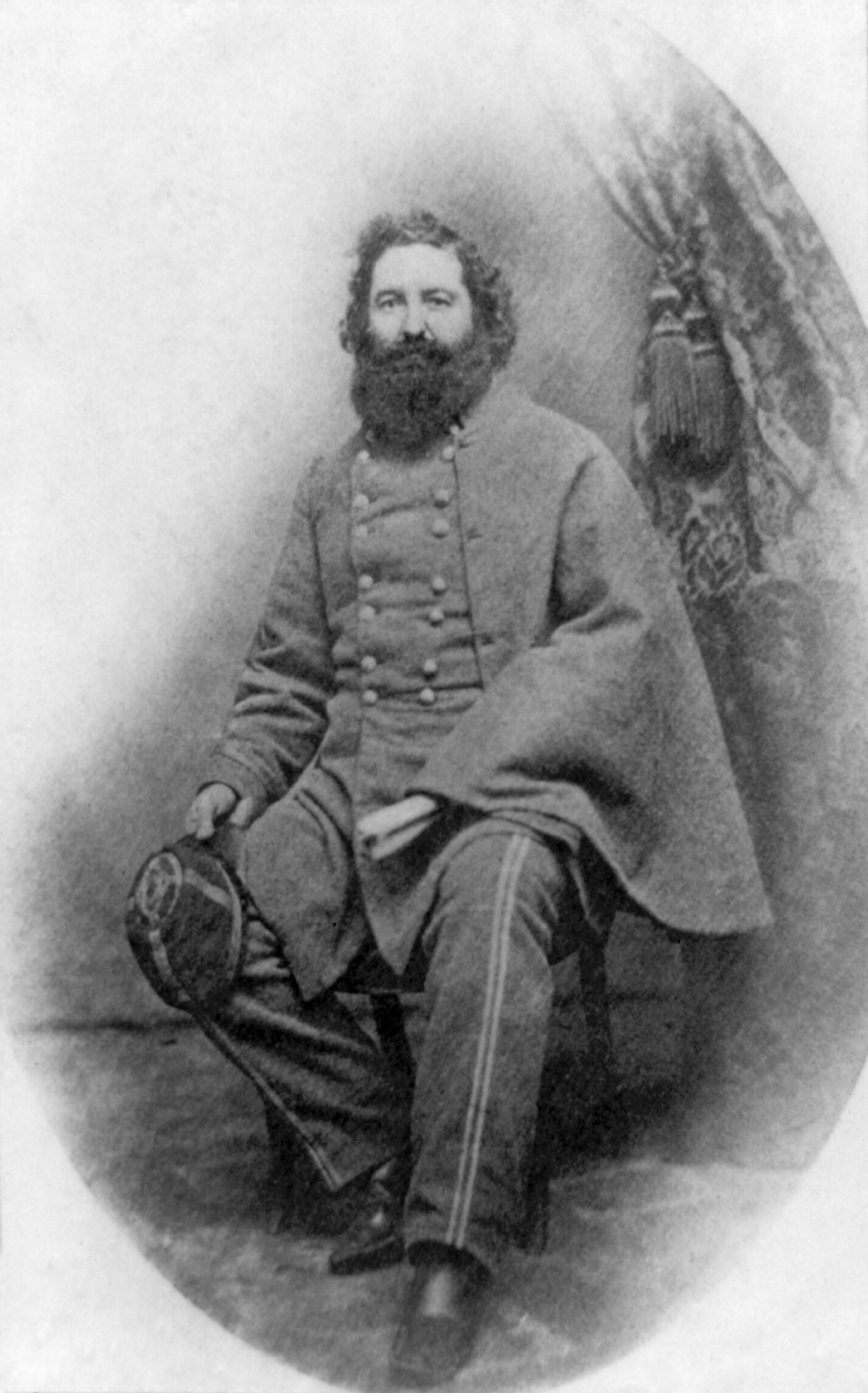
Lafayette McLaws

The fourth Federal stand was on the east side of Turkey Creek, selected by Burnside. The eastern slope was as much as 100 ft (30.5 m) above the creek and the terrain was very open. The Concord Road joined the Kingston Road on the east bank of Turkey Creek. The Matthew Russell House was in front of the Federal position and the Avery Russell House was farther west. White posted Henshaw's Illinois Battery and Captain Joseph A. Sims' 24th Indiana Battery south of the Kingston Road, supported by two regiments of Chapin's brigade. Chapin's other two regiments were just north of the road. As IX Corps troops arrived, they were put in position.

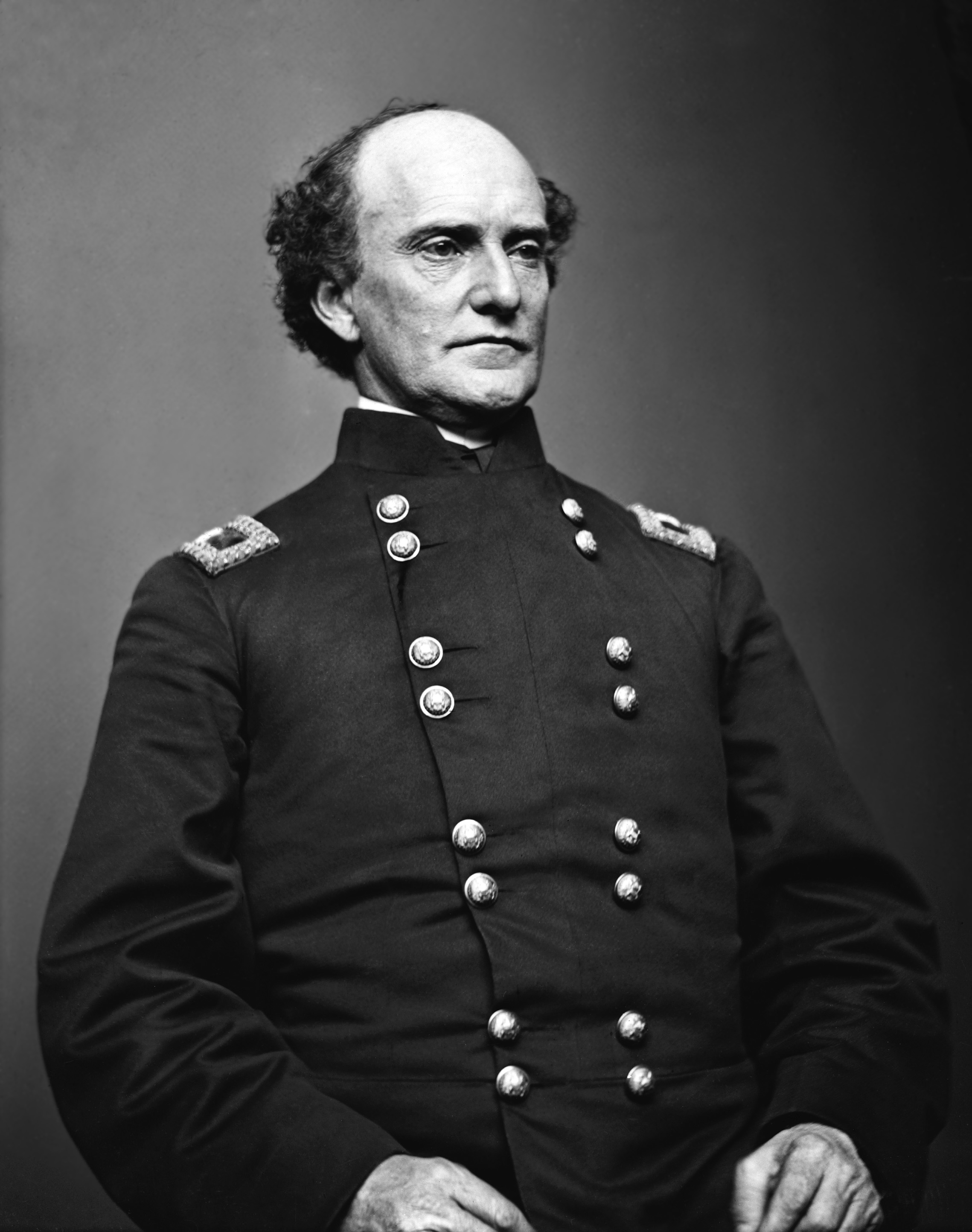
Julius White

Lieutenant Samuel Nicoll Benjamin's 2nd U.S. Artillery, Battery E and Gittings' battery unlimbered north of the Kingston Road, while Roemer's battery was placed farther east, south of the road. Captain William W. Buckley's Battery D, 1st Rhode Island and Captain John von Sehlen's 15th Indiana Battery were placed behind Henshaw's and Sim's batteries. Morrison's brigade formed behind Roemer's battery, except for the 45th Pennsylvania Infantry Regiment which deployed as skirmishers south of the Kingston Road. Humphrey's brigade formed on Chapin's right with Colonel Benjamin C. Christ's brigade of Ferrero's division behind it. Colonel Joshua K. Siegfried's brigade of Hartranft's division was to the left of Christ. Potter sent Biddle's cavalry scouting to the north, while the 112th Illinois Mounted Infantry scouted south toward Concord. Altogether, Burnside had about 9,000 troops in line.

At noon, Jenkins posted Bratton's brigade to the right of the Kingston Road with Anderson's brigade on its right. Brigadier General Evander M. Law's brigade was to Anderson's right. In second line were the brigades of Brigadier Generals Henry L. Benning and Jerome B. Robertson. Longstreet had 12,000 men available, but only Jenkins' division was present at first, and it suffered from accurate Union artillery fire. When McLaws' troops arrived, they were placed with the brigades of Brigadier General Joseph B. Kershaw and Colonel Solon Z. Ruff to the north of the Kingston Road and Colonel Goode Bryan's brigade in second line. Brigadier General Benjamin G. Humphreys' brigade and Hart's cavalry were placed on the far left with orders to turn the Federal right flank. Humphreys' Confederates pressed against Humphrey's Union troops, until about 1:30 pm, when Hartranft ordered Christ's brigade to the front line in place of Humphrey's men.

Because Longstreet failed to issue clear orders, both McLaws and Jenkins believed the other was supposed to make the main assault. For three hours no major attack was made, and the action became an artillery duel. Two of Sims' guns were disabled and a Confederate-made 20-pounder Parrott rifle in Captain Pichegru Woolfolk's Virginia battery burst its barrel when fired. At 3 pm, Jenkins became impatient and obtained permission from Longstreet to launch a flanking attack. He sent the brigades of Law, Anderson and Benning filing to the right, through a wooded area, to get into a position to envelop the Federal left flank. The effort miscarried when Law's brigade attacked in the wrong direction. By 3 pm, Burnside was ready to pull back again, with Chapin's brigade and Roemer's battery forming the rearguard. The withdrawal was managed in good order and neither Jenkins nor McLaws made a serious effort to interfere.

At 4 pm, Burnside's soldiers made the fifth Federal stand of the day on high ground athwart the Kingston Road. This was near where a road went north from the Kingston Road to a now-vanished hamlet named Loveville. The position's only weakness was a patch of high ground about 1 mi (1.6 km) south of the road. Ferrero's division deployed north of the road, with Morrison's brigade in the first line and Humphrey's and Christ's brigade in a second line. Ferrero's division was supported by Sims' and Benjamin's batteries. Hartranft's division was posted south of the road with the 107th Illinois and Roemer's battery to its right and the rest of Chapin's brigade in the second line. When the Confederate infantry approached, it was stopped by Federal artillery fire. Colonel Edward Porter Alexander unlimbered the Confederate guns and another artillery duel commenced, with neither side gaining the upper hand. Jenkins moved the brigades of Benning, Anderson, and Law into the high ground to the south. This prompted Hartranft to face his troops to the south and for Roemer's guns to shell Jenkins' flankers. By 6 pm, Burnside ordered Ferrero's men to retreat, followed by the artillery and Hartranft's division. Chapin's men again formed the rearguard. After an exhausting march on empty stomachs, the first Union infantry reached Knoxville at 4 am on November 17.

== Results ==
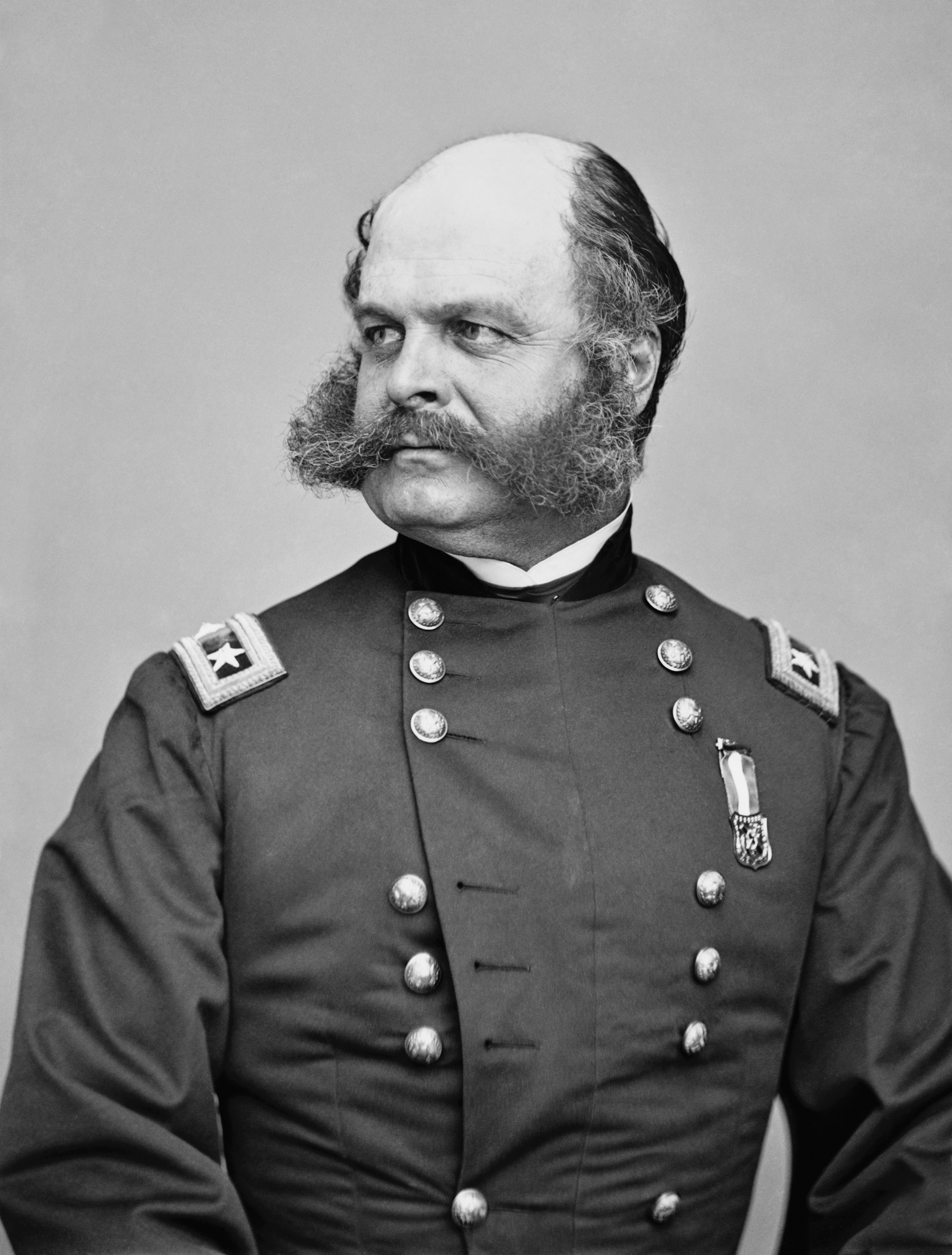
Ambrose Burnside

Many Union officers were proud of the way that their units executed maneuvers during the battle. The artillery of both sides took a prominent part; Roemer's battery fired 429 rounds during the action. The National Park Service estimated that there were 400 Union and 570 Confederate casualties at Campbell's Station. It noted that Burnside's troops won the "race" for Campbell's Station and that the Knoxville campaign might have ended differently if Longstreet's men had reached there first. Union losses at Campbell's Station amounted to 31 killed, 211 wounded, and 76 missing, for a total of 318 casualties. Ferrero's division lost 232, White's division lost 63, and Hartranft's division lost 15. Adding the 120 casualties at Lenoir's Station makes 438 Federal losses for November 14–16, exclusive of the cavalry fighting on the south bank. McLaws did not report losses, but Jenkins admitted sustaining 174 casualties, of which 124 came from Bratton's brigade. Local inhabitants reported that the Confederates lost 91 killed and 300 wounded, but that is probably an overestimate. In his Battles and Leaders article, Orlando Metcalfe Poe suggested that Union and Confederate losses were equal.

The actions at Campbell's Station and Lenoir's Station represented Longstreet's best chance of smashing Burnside and seizing Knoxville. Longstreet's failure to wreck Burnside's forces in the field greatly lessened his chances of capturing Knoxville. Later, Longstreet blamed his guides and a lack of maps for his inability to outmarch Burnside to Campbell's Station. In fact, he was informed of his opportunity by McLaws and others on the evening of November 15, but simply did not act. For his part, Burnside managed his outnumbered force well and kept ahead of the Confederate pursuit. Not only did this save Knoxville from capture, but it drew Longstreet's forces farther away from Bragg's army which was being threatened by Grant's buildup of Federal troops. This situation benefitted Federal overall strategy.

On November 29, 1863, only 30 minutes after the Confederate attack on Fort Sanders failed, Longstreet received official news that Grant had beaten Bragg at the Battle of Missionary Ridge. This defeat meant that Longstreet's line of communication with Bragg's army was cut. Major General William Tecumseh Sherman with 30,000 Union infantry set out from Chattanooga on November 29 in order to relieve Knoxville. Badly outnumbered, Longstreet raised the siege of Knoxville on December 4 and withdrew northeast to Rogersville.

== Preservation ==
Campbell's Station was incorporated as Farragut on January 16, 1980. The town was named after Admiral David Farragut who was born in the area. The Avery Russell House, also known as the Campbell's Station Inn, was built in the early 1800s and was used as a stopping place for people passing through Knoxville. Early visitors included Tennessee Governor John Sevier and President Andrew Jackson, who raced horses at a track in nearby Concord. The building is located at the corner of Kingston Pike and Campbell Station Road. There is an historical marker commemorating the Battle of Campbell's Station at Farragut Town Hall.

== See also ==
- Knoxville Union order of battle
