= Cole Strange =

American football player (born 1998)

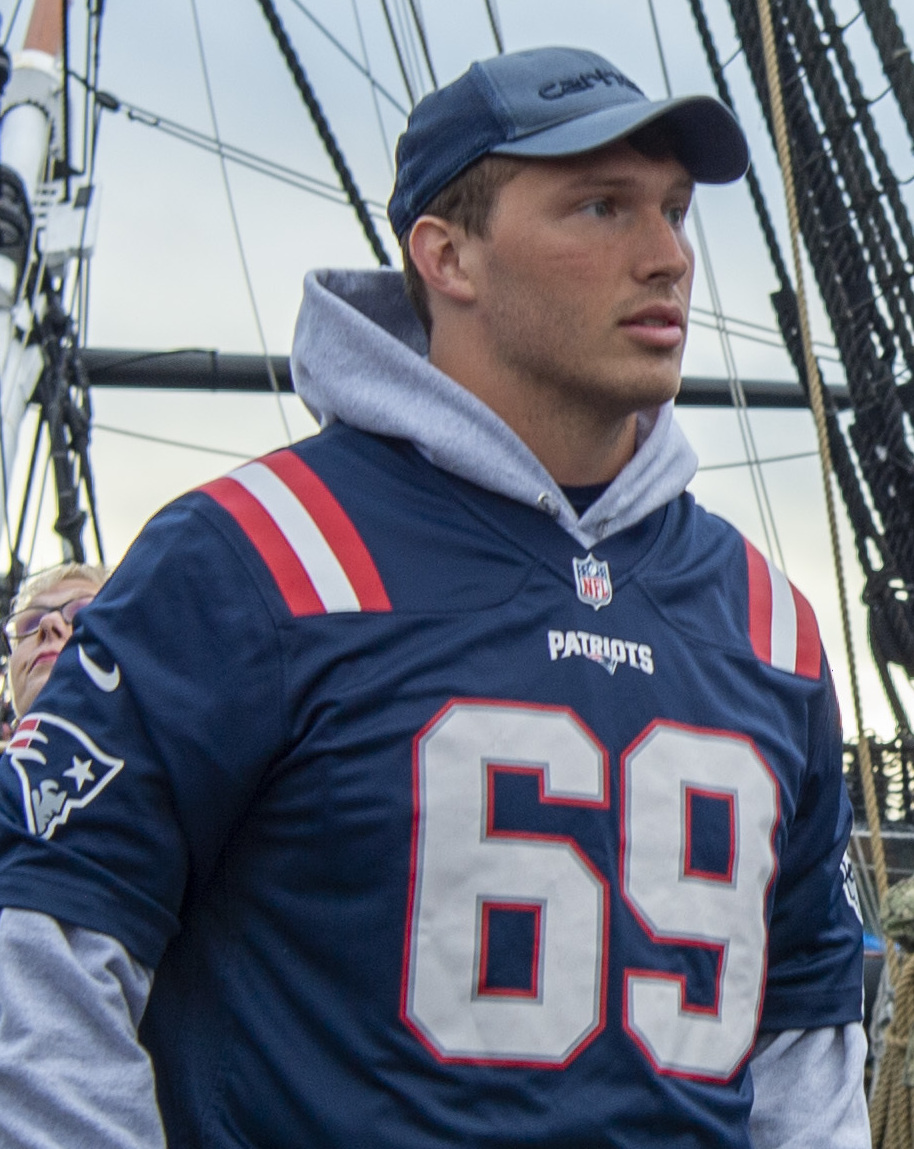
- Strange with the New England Patriots in 2022 aboard the USS Constitution

No. 69 – Los Angeles Chargers
- Position: Guard
- Roster status: Active

Personal information
- Born: July 31, 1998 (age 28); Knoxville, Tennessee, U.S.
- Listed height: 6 ft 5 in (1.96 m)
- Listed weight: 305 lb (138 kg)

Career information
- High school: Farragut (Farragut, Tennessee)
- College: Chattanooga (2016–2021)
- NFL draft: 2022: 1st round, 29th overall pick

Career history
- New England Patriots (2022–2024); Cleveland Browns (2025)*; Miami Dolphins (2025); Los Angeles Chargers (2026–present)
- * Offseason or practice squad member only

Awards and highlights
- 2× SoCon Jacobs Blocking Trophy (2020, 2021); First-team All-SoCon (2021); 3× Second-team All-SoCon (2018–2020)

Career NFL statistics as of Week 5, 2026
- Games played: 49
- Games started: 48
- Stats at Pro Football Reference

Devin Cole Strange (born July 31, 1998) is an American professional football guard for the Los Angeles Chargers of the National Football League (NFL). He played college football for the Chattanooga Mocs and was selected by the New England Patriots in the first round of the 2022 NFL draft.

== Early life ==
Strange grew up in Knoxville, Tennessee, and attended Farragut High School. He primarily played defensive end at Farragut and was named the Knoxville Interscholastic League Defensive Player of the Year as a senior after recording 103.5 tackles, 18 tackles for loss, and 7.5 sacks. Strange was rated a two-star recruit and initially committed to play college football at the University of Tennessee at Chattanooga, but later de-committed and signed a letter of intent to play at the Air Force Academy.

== College career ==
Strange briefly attended Air Force during the Basic Cadet Training period before transferring to Chattanooga and redshirting his freshman season. As a redshirt freshman, he played in ten games with six starts at left guard. Strange started all 11 games at left guard during his redshirt sophomore and was named second-team All-Southern Conference (SoCon). He repeated as a second-team All-SoCon selection as a redshirt junior after starting 11 games at left guard and the final game of the Mocs' season at center due to an injury.

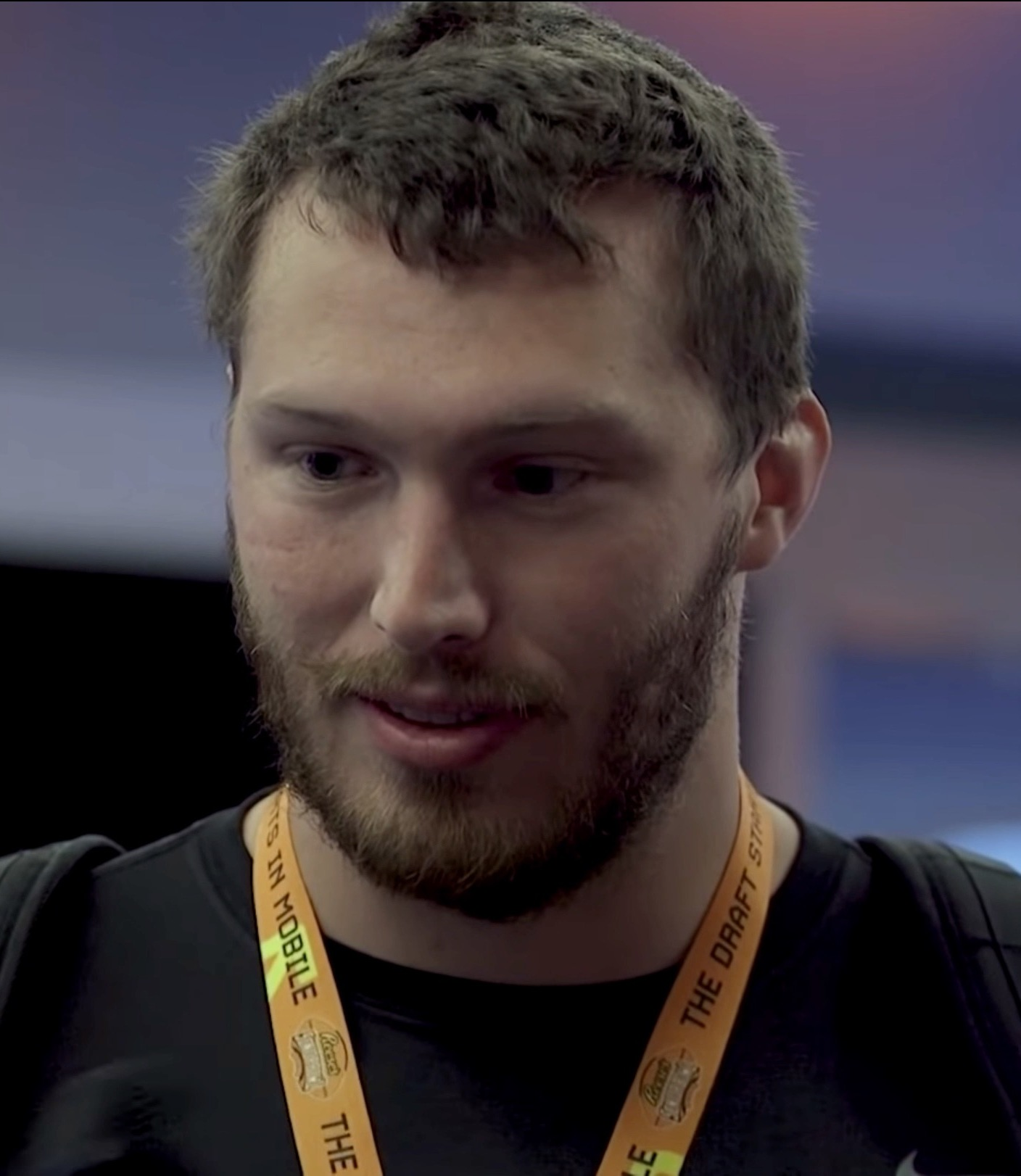
Strange in 2022

Strange started four of five possible games at left guard and won the Jacobs Blocking Award as the best blocker in the SoCon during redshirt senior season, which was shortened and played in the spring of 2021 due to the COVID-19 pandemic. He decided to utilize the extra year of eligibility granted to college athletes who played in the 2020 season due to the coronavirus pandemic and return to Chattanooga for a sixth season. In 2021, Strange was named first-team All-SoCon and won a second straight Jacobs Blocking Award. After the conclusion of his college career, he played in the 2022 Senior Bowl.

== Professional career ==
Pre-draft measurables
Height	Weight	Arm length	Hand span	Wingspan	40-yard dash	10-yard split	20-yard split	20-yard shuttle	Three-cone drill	Vertical jump	Broad jump	Bench press
6 ft 4 7/8 in (1.95 m)	307 lb (139 kg)	33 in (0.84 m)	10 1/8 in (0.26 m)	6 ft 7 3/4 in (2.03 m)	5.03 s	1.73 s	2.89 s	4.50 s	7.44 s	28.0 in (0.71 m)	10 ft 0 in (3.05 m)	31 reps
All values from NFL Combine

=== New England Patriots ===
Strange was selected by the New England Patriots in the first round (29th overall) of the 2022 NFL draft, despite many analysts predicting that he would still be available in the third or fourth round. He was named the Patriots' starting left guard as a rookie, and started every game.

In 2023, Strange started all 10 games that he appeared in, notching one fumble recovery. In Week 15 against the Kansas City Chiefs, Strange suffered a torn patellar tendon in his left knee, ending his season.

Strange was placed on the reserve/PUP list to begin the 2024 season while recovering from his knee injury. He was activated on December 10. Strange made three appearances and two starts in the 2024 season.

On August 26, 2025, Strange was released by the Patriots as part of final roster cuts.

=== Cleveland Browns ===
On August 28, 2025, Strange was signed to the Cleveland Browns' practice squad.

=== Miami Dolphins ===
On September 9, 2025, Strange was signed to the Miami Dolphins' active roster.

=== Los Angeles Chargers ===
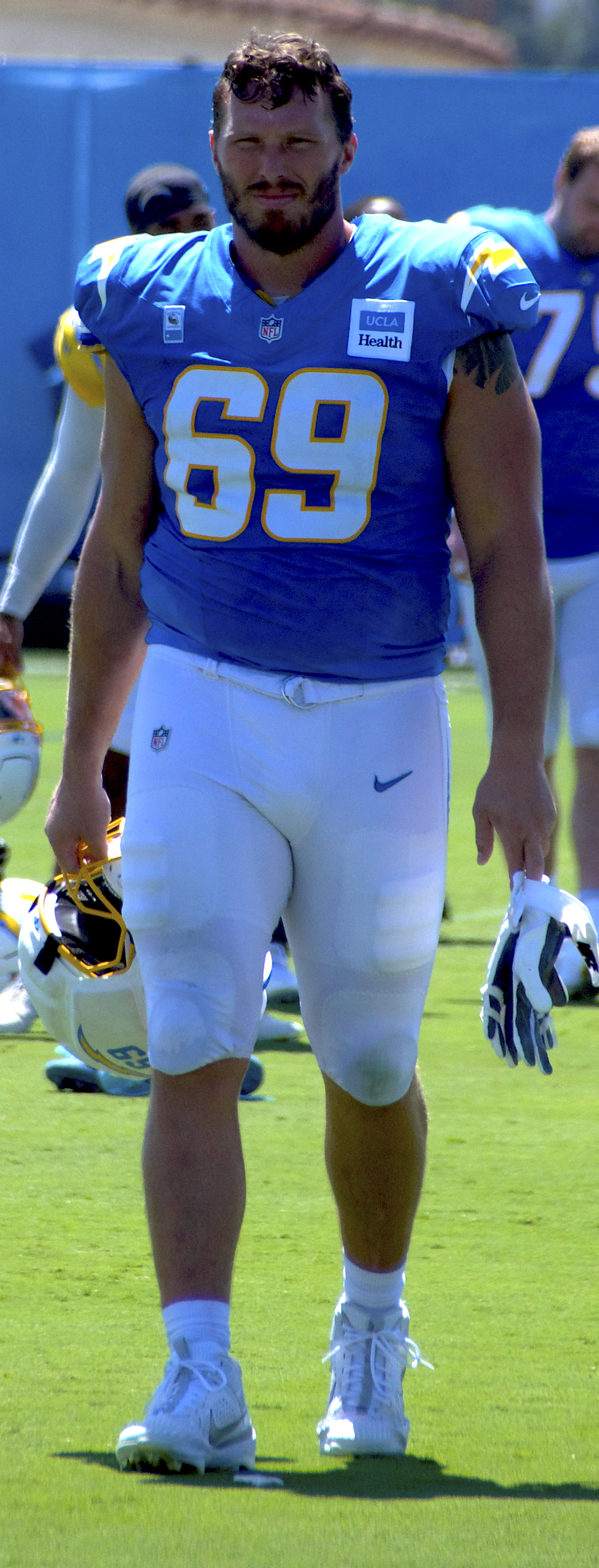
Strange during the 2026 training camp with the Chargers

On March 10, 2026, Strange signed a two-year, $13 million contract with the Los Angeles Chargers, reuniting him with his former head coach Mike McDaniel.

== Personal life ==
Strange has a bachelor's degree in psychology. He is currently working on a Masters in Engineering Management online from UTC.
