= Monica E. Peek =

American physician

- Born: Knoxville, Tennessee

Academic background
- Education: BSc, 1991, Vanderbilt University; MD, 1996, MPH, 1996, Johns Hopkins University

Academic work
- Institutions: Pritzker School of Medicine

Monica Elizabeth Peek is an American physician. She is the Ellen H. Block Professor for Health Justice and Associate Vice Chair for Research Faculty Development at the University of Chicago's Pritzker School of Medicine. Prior to joining the University of Chicago, Peek led outreach programs through the Rockwell Gardens to educate African-Americans about health.

== Early life and education ==
Peek was born and raised in Knoxville, Tennessee, to parents Marvin and Denice. Her father was a professor of African-American history while her mother was the director of development at Michigan State University. Growing up in Tennessee, she enrolled at Farragut High School and was crowned Miss Jabberwock 1985 as a senior. Peek graduated from Farragut with a GPA of 3.89 and choose to enrol at Vanderbilt University despite scholarship offers from Emory University and Oberlin College. During her undergraduate studies, Peek received the 1990 Time College Achievement Award after maintaining a 3.6 GPA while she was also involved in numerous clubs including Vanderbilt Against Apartheid, Students for Women's Concerns, Campus Kaleidoscope, and the Vanderbilt AIDS project. As president of the Black Student Alliance at Vanderbilt, she fought to have Hall W. Thompson ousted from the school's board due to his white's only Shoal Creek Club.

Peek completed her Bachelor of Science degree at Vanderbilt in 1991 and enrolled at Johns Hopkins University for her medical degree and Master of Public Health. While completing her medical degree, she took a year off between her 3rd and 4th year of medical school to get her public health degree. As a student at Johns Hopkins, Peek spent 15 days visiting indigenous Mayan populations in remote communities across Guatemala. After graduating in 1996, Peek completed her residency in internal medicine at Stanford University Medical Center.

== Career ==
Following her residency, Peek worked for two years at a free clinic in Ohio before moving to Chicago to work for the John H. Stroger Jr. Hospital of Cook County and Rush University Medical Center. During this time, she received funding from George Soros to remedy health disparities between black and white women. She worked with the Open Society Institute to assist women in public housing to be health educators and community health workers around breast cancer screening and general women’s health. This eventually developed into an outreach program she founded at Rockwell Gardens called "Sisters Working It Out." Her efforts earned her recognition from Crain's Chicago Business in 2001 as a "40 under 40."

After working for the National Health Service Corps for two years, Peeks joined the University of Chicago's Pritzker School of Medicine in 2006. As a professor at UChicago, Peek helped launch the South Side Diabetes Collaborative to educate African-Americans about diabetes. Her research team collected quantitative data by asking questions about patient-provider communications, trust, diabetes knowledge and history, and their confidence in managing the disease. She was also appointed Associate Director of the Chicago Center for Diabetes Translation Research and Director of Research at the MacLean Center for Clinical Medical Ethics. In 2018, she was presented with the Schweitzer Leadership Award from the Katten Muchin Rosenman LLP, Health & Medicine Policy Research Group and the Chicago Area Schweitzer Fellowship. Peek and her colleague Marshall Chin were co-appointed as directors of the national program office of Bridging the Gap: Reducing Disparities in Diabetes Care. The aim of the initiative is to "improve access to high-quality diabetes care among the most vulnerable and underserved communities across the country."

Throughout the COVID-19 pandemic, Peek continued her activism in addressing healthcare discrimination and structural racism. She specifically attempted to address vaccine hesitancy among African-Americans. Her efforts were recognized by CME Outfitters, LLC who appointed her to Chair their Educational Roundtable on Unconscious Bias and Disparities in Healthcare. The University of Chicago also appointed her to the rank of Distinguished Professor with a promotion to the Ellen H. Block Professor for Health Justice in their Department of Medicine.

In 2022, Peek was elected a Member of the National Academy of Medicine for her "international leadership in reducing health disparities, through research on how structural racism and the social determinants of health perpetuate disparities among African Americans." She later received the 2023 University of Chicago Diversity Award as a staff member who has shown a "commitment to fostering justice and equality."
