= Hardin Valley Academy =

Location
- 11345 Hardin Valley Rd; Knoxville, Tennessee; United States
- Coordinates: 35.936°N 84.181°W

Information
- Type: Public High School
- Motto: "Excellence for every child"
- Established: 2008
- Status: Open
- Teaching staff: 125.50 (FTE)
- Grades: 9-12
- Enrollment: 2,112 (2022-2023)
- Student to teacher ratio: 16.83
- Colors: Navy and Columbia Blue
- Athletics: Soccer, Tennis, Track, Cross Country, Swimming, Bowling, Wrestling, Football, Baseball, Cheerleading and Dance, Golf, Volleyball, Softball, Basketball, Marching Band, Lacrosse.
- Mascot: Hawk
- Nickname: Hawks
- Website: https://hardinvalleyac.knoxschools.org/

Hardin Valley Academy, located at 11345 Hardin Valley Road, is a Knox County high school that was founded in 2008. The school is split into four academies: Liberal Arts, STEM (Science, Technology, Engineering, and Mathematics), Health Sciences, and BLPA (Business, Law, and Public Affairs).

It serves portions of Farragut north of Interstate 75.

== City and state titles ==
=== State ===
- 2016 - 1st (259.0 Points)
- 2015 - 3rd (246.0 Points)
- 2014 - 8th (160.0 Points)
- 2013 - 11th (132.0 Points)
- 2012 - 7th (217.0 Points)
- 2011 - 10th (163.0 Points)
- 2010 - 12th (157.0 Points)
- 2009 - 8th (119.0 Points)

=== City ===
- 2015 - 1st (509.0 Points)
- 2014 - 4th (389.0 Points)
- 2013 - 5th (343.0 Points)
- 2012 - 3rd (535.0 Points)
- 2011 - 3rd (544.0 Points)
- 2010 - 3rd (497.5 Points)
- 2009 - 4th (349.0 Points)

=== The Nest Egg ===
Unique to Hardin Valley Academy is an official branch of the UT Federal Credit Union known as the Nest Egg. This bank, operated by students during lunch, provides all the amenities of a standard bank while also helping students learn firsthand the principles of finance.

=== Scholars' Bowl ===
Founded a year after the school's inception, Hardin Valley Academy hosts an official scholars' bowl team, which competes annually in the televised East Tennessee PBS Scholars' Bowl competition. In 2021, Hardin Valley won the tournament for the first time in school history.

=== Student government ===
The student government of Hardin Valley Academy sponsors the Knoxville Polar Plunge each year to benefit the Special Olympics of Tennessee. They also host a Special Olympics competition on Hardin Valley's campus every spring.

=== Technology Student Association ===
Twelve state officers of the Tennessee Technology Student Association and four national officers of the organization have been members of Hardin Valley Academy's chapter.
