= Avery Russell House =

Historic house in Tennessee, United States

- Campbell Station Inn (Avery Russell House)
- U.S. National Register of Historic Places
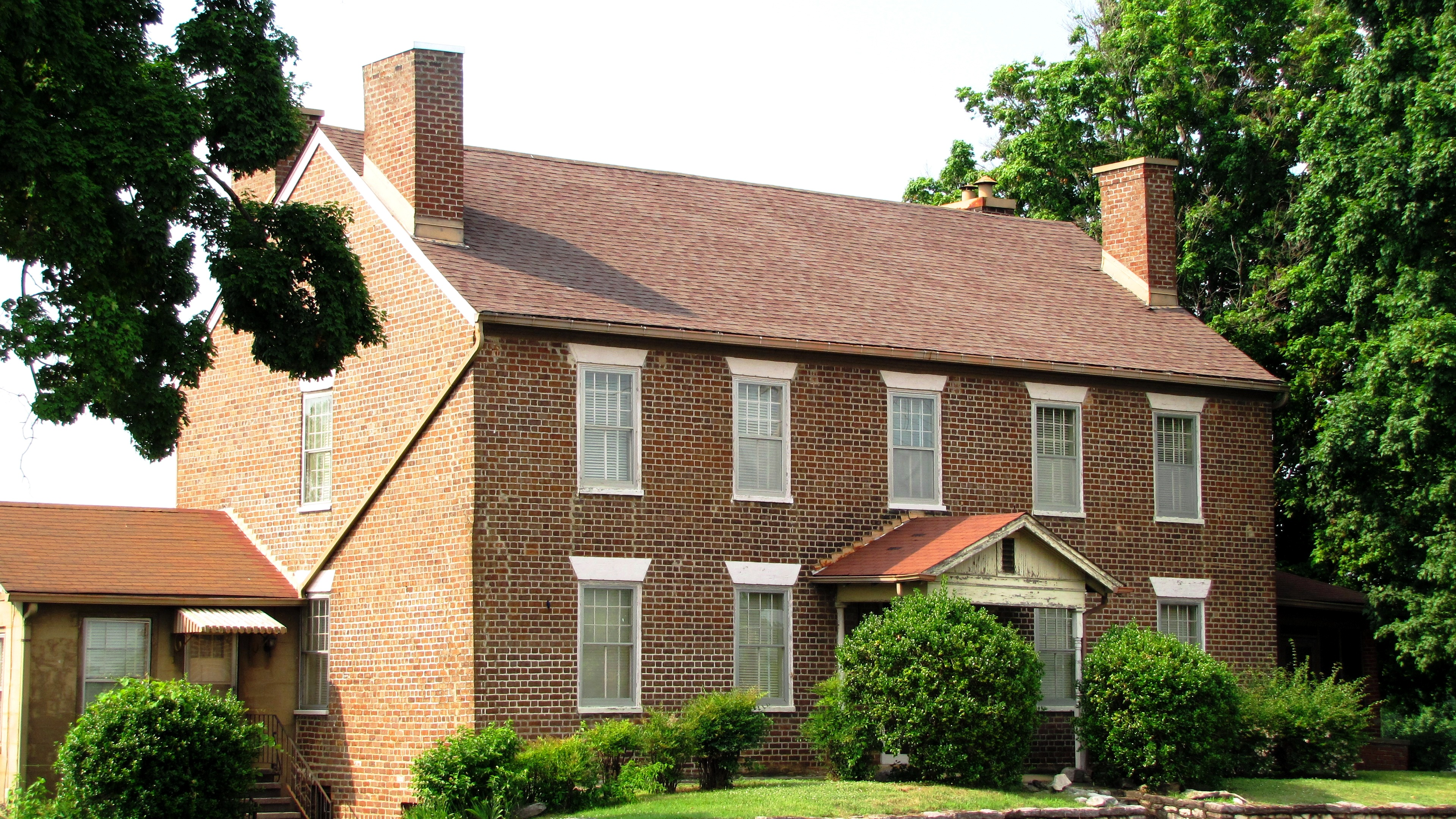

- Location within Tennessee Location within the United States
- Location: 11409 Kingston Pike; Farragut, Tennessee
- Coordinates: 35°52′51.42″N 84°9′41.31″W
- Built: 1835
- Architect: Samuel Martin
- Architectural style: Federal
- NRHP reference No.: 75001759
- Added to NRHP: June 5, 1975

The Avery Russell House, also called the Martin-Russell House or the Campbell's Station Inn, is a historic home located at 11409 Kingston Pike in Farragut, Tennessee, United States.

The Federal-style, two-story brick structure was built by Samuel Martin as an inn around 1835, on the site of Captain David Campbell's 1787 blockhouse. Just before the Civil War, the inn was sold to Avery Russell, who then used it as a family residence. It remained in the Russell family for six generations. During the Civil War Battle of Campbell's Station on November 16, 1863, the house served as a temporary hospital.

Although it has had several alterations, the house remains an example of rural East Tennessee architecture. It is listed on the National Register of Historic Places.
