= Jerry Sisk Jr. =

American gemologist (1953–2013)

Gerald D. "Jerry" Sisk Jr. (February 2, 1953 – January 13, 2013) was an American gemologist who co-founded Jewelry Television (JTV) in 1993. Sisk also served as the executive vice president of Jewelry Television until his death in 2013.

== Biography ==
Sisk was born in New York and raised in the New York City Metropolitan Area. He began working in the jewelry industry as an apprentice as a teenager. He earned a bachelor's degree from the University of Tennessee in Knoxville, where he was a member of the Pride of the Southland Band as a student.

Sisk, who spoke six languages fluently, was a graduate gemologist accredited through studies at the Gemological Institute of America (GIA). He traveled to approximately forty countries during his career. He was a national committee member for the Gemstone Industry and Laboratory Conference and a member of the International Colored Gemstone Association.

In 1993, Sisk co-founded what would become Jewelry Television together with two partners and longtime friends, Bob Hall and Bill Kouns. Kouns was a jewelry expert, while Hall had spent his career in the television industry. The new home shopping channel broadcast from a small studio in Greeneville, Tennessee, utilizing just one television camera. Eventually, Sisk and his partners moved to a larger, permanent television studio in Knoxville as business and viewers increased. Jewelry Television, which calls itself the largest retailer of loose gemstones in the United States, employed more than 1,200 people by the time of Sisk's death.

Sisk's best known book, Guide to Gems & Jewelry, has sold more than 15,000 copies, resulting in a second edition. In April 2012, the Jewelers Circular Keystone, an industry trade magazine, included Sisk on its "Power List of industry movers and shakers" within the gem and gemstone field. The magazine called Sisk the fourth most influential person in its "Gems and gemology" sublist.

Within the Knoxville area, Sisk served as a former President of the Knoxville Opera Company and held a seat on the Knoxville Symphony Orchestra.

Sisk died in his sleep at his home in Farragut, Tennessee, on January 13, 2013, at the age of 59. He was survived by his wife of thirty-seven years, Karen Lawhorn Sisk, his mother, Elaine Sisk, and his sister, Melanie. He was buried in Concord Masonic Cemetery in Concord, Tennessee.
