= Knoxville Christian School =

Coordinates: 35.907°N 84.172°W

- 11549 Snyder Rd, Knoxville, Tennessee; United States

Information
- Other name: KCS
- Type: Private Christian
- Religious affiliation: Christian
- Established: 1967 (59 years ago)
- President: Bobby Simpson
- Grades: K–12th grade
- Enrollment: >220 (2012)
- Nickname: Knights
- Website: kcsknights.org

Knoxville Christian School (KCS) is a private 18 months–12th grade Christian school in Farragut, Tennessee, near Knoxville.

== History ==
The school was started by local Church of Christ members in 1967 and moved to its present location at 11549 Snyder Road in 1979. The school added a new high school building in 2010, a new baseball complex in 2011, and a new gymnasium was completed in late 2013. The basketball courts are named The Wade & Allan Houston Courts through a partnership with the athletes.

The current President of KCS is Bobby Simpson. The vice president is Bud Ford.

== Academics ==
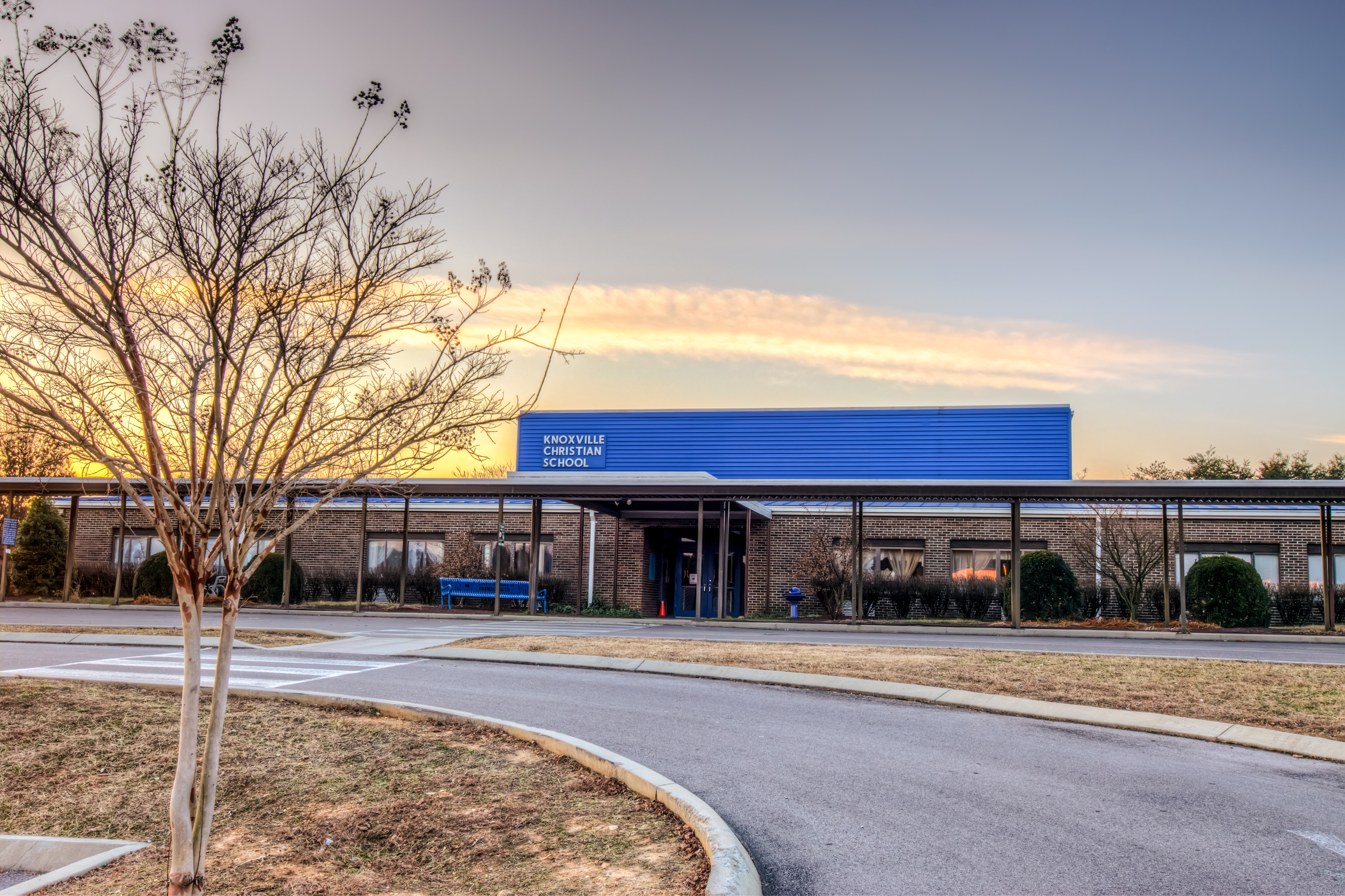
Exterior of Knoxville Christian School Elementary building.

Knoxville Christian School began as a K-5 institution but has expanded over the years to include a comprehensive K-12 offering. The school offers AP courses in core subject areas and has college-credit opportunities with nearby Pellissippi State Community College. As a Christian school, students take courses in the Bible and also attend a twice-weekly chapel.

Knoxville Christian has accreditations from AdvancED, formerly Southern Association of Colleges and Schools (SACS) and the National Christian School Association (NCSA).

In 2012 KCS had an enrollment of greater than 220 students, almost triple the amount the school had in 2008. Through college prep classes the students have improved ACT scores to a 24 average - higher than the state and national averages.

== Athletics ==
Knoxville Christian School currently offers athletic programs in several sports. Silas Clark is the current Athletic Director at KCS. They currently field teams in basketball for K-12 both boys and girls, volleyball for girls in Middle and High School, cheerleading at all levels, bowling for grades 8-12, cross country, soccer for middle school and high school, and flag football. The basketball team is coached by Justin Foster.
