= Neil Clabo =

American football player (1952–2024)

No. 12
- Position: Punter

Personal information
- Born: November 18, 1952; Miami Beach, Florida, U.S.
- Died: July 10, 2024 (aged 71); Knoxville, Tennessee, U.S.
- Listed height: 6 ft 2 in (1.88 m)
- Listed weight: 200 lb (91 kg)

Career information
- High school: Farragut (Farragut, Tennessee)
- College: Tennessee
- NFL draft: 1975: 10th round, 258th overall pick

Career history
- Minnesota Vikings (1975–1977)

Awards and highlights
- PFWA All-Rookie Team (1975); First-team All-SEC (1974); Second-team All-SEC (1973)

Career NFL statistics
- Punts: 225
- Punt yards: 8,977
- Longest punt: 69
- Stats at Pro Football Reference

William Neil Clabo (November 18, 1952 – July 10, 2024) was an American professional football player who was a punter for three season with the Minnesota Vikings of the National Football League (NFL) from 1975 to 1977. He was named to the PFWA All-Rookie Team. He was voted to the Pro Football Writers All-Pro second team for the 1975 season. He played in Super Bowl XI with the Vikings.

Neil Clabo is the uncle of retired NFL offensive tackle Tyson Clabo.

In 2013, Clabo was inducted into the Greater Knoxville Sports Hall of Fame.

Clabo died from complications of Alzheimer's disease on July 10, 2024, at the age of 71.
