= Farragut High School =

American public high school

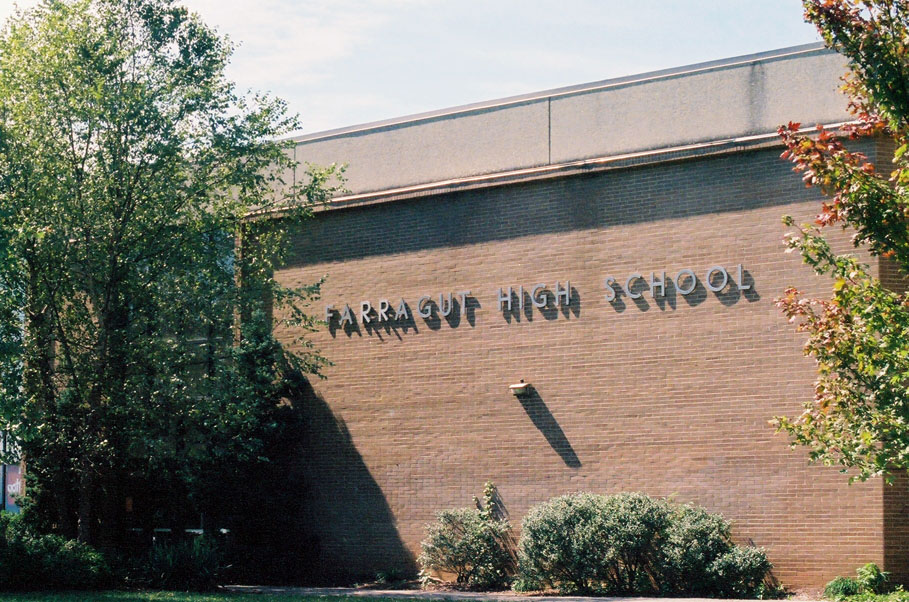

Location
- 11237 Kingston Pike; Farragut, Tennessee; United States; 35.8863°N 84.1586°W

Information
- Type: Public high school
- Established: 1904
- Principal: John Bartlett
- Teaching staff: 112.83 (FTE)
- Grades: 9-12
- Enrollment: 2,073 (2024-2025)
- Student to teacher ratio: 18.53
- Colors: Navy Blue and Gray
- Mascot: Admiral
- Nickname: Admirals
- Rival: Bearden High School
- Website: https://farraguths.knoxschools.org/

Farragut High School, located at 11237 Kingston Pike, serves as a high school in Farragut, a suburb of Knoxville, Tennessee. Knox County Schools, the unified Knox County, Tennessee school district, operates the school.

The school serves the majority of Farragut, portions south of Interstate 40.

The original Farragut High School, built in 1904, occupied a strip of land adjacent to Kingston Pike, becoming the first consolidated high school in Knox County. In 1976, the school relocated to its current location on a hill overlooking Farragut on the opposite side of Kingston Pike. A supermarket and strip mall dominate the original site, razed after the construction of the new buildings.

The school bears the name of Civil War hero David Glasgow Farragut, the Union admiral born in the area.

== Academics ==
In September 2007, Farragut High School tied with White Station High School for the most National Merit Semifinalists (16) in the state. In 2008, Farragut had the largest number of National Merit Finalists in the state with a total of 16 students. In 2005 and 2006, Farragut made the Newsweek list of the top 5 percent of public high schools in the nation based on its AP program.

== Athletics ==
The school fields a nationally ranked baseball team, claiming State Titles in 1982, 2003, 2004, 2006, 2008, 2009, 2010, 2011, 2014 and 2019, 2022, 2023, 2024, 2025, and 2026. Their football team won a state championship in 2016. Their softball team won State Titles in 1982, 2021, 2022 and 2023. Their Dance team has won two consecutive national titles and Universal Dance Association’s National Dance Team Championship: 2018 and 2019. They also have won five consecutive state titles. The lacrosse team have also won multiple state championships. The school also fields varsity teams in the following sports: Basketball, Soccer, Lacrosse, Track and Field, Cross Country, Golf, Swimming, Girls Volleyball and Wrestling.

== Notable alumni ==
- Bill Bates, NFL player
- Channon Christian, college student and murder victim
- Cole Strange, current NFL player
- Neil Clabo, former NFL player
- Tyson Clabo, former NFL player
- Lewis Cosby, Bass Player for the band 10 Years
- Elaine Davis, Tennessee State Representative
- John Davis, guitarist and lead singer of Superdrag
- Nicky Delmonico, former MLB player and current Minor League Baseball coach
- Ben Garant, actor and comedian
- Ben Joyce, MLB player
- Michael McKenry, former MLB player
- Chris Moneymaker, 2003 World Series of Poker Champion
- Monica E. Peek, physician
- Philip Pfeifer, MLB player
- Matt Ramsey, former MLB player
- Nick Senzel, MLB player
- Jake Thomas, actor
- Kyle Waldrop, former MLB player
- Matt Wantland, Guitarist for the band 10 Years
- Jason Zachary, politician
- Colin Britain, music producer and drummer for Linkin Park.
