= Rockwell Gardens =

Public housing complex in Chicago, Illinois, United States

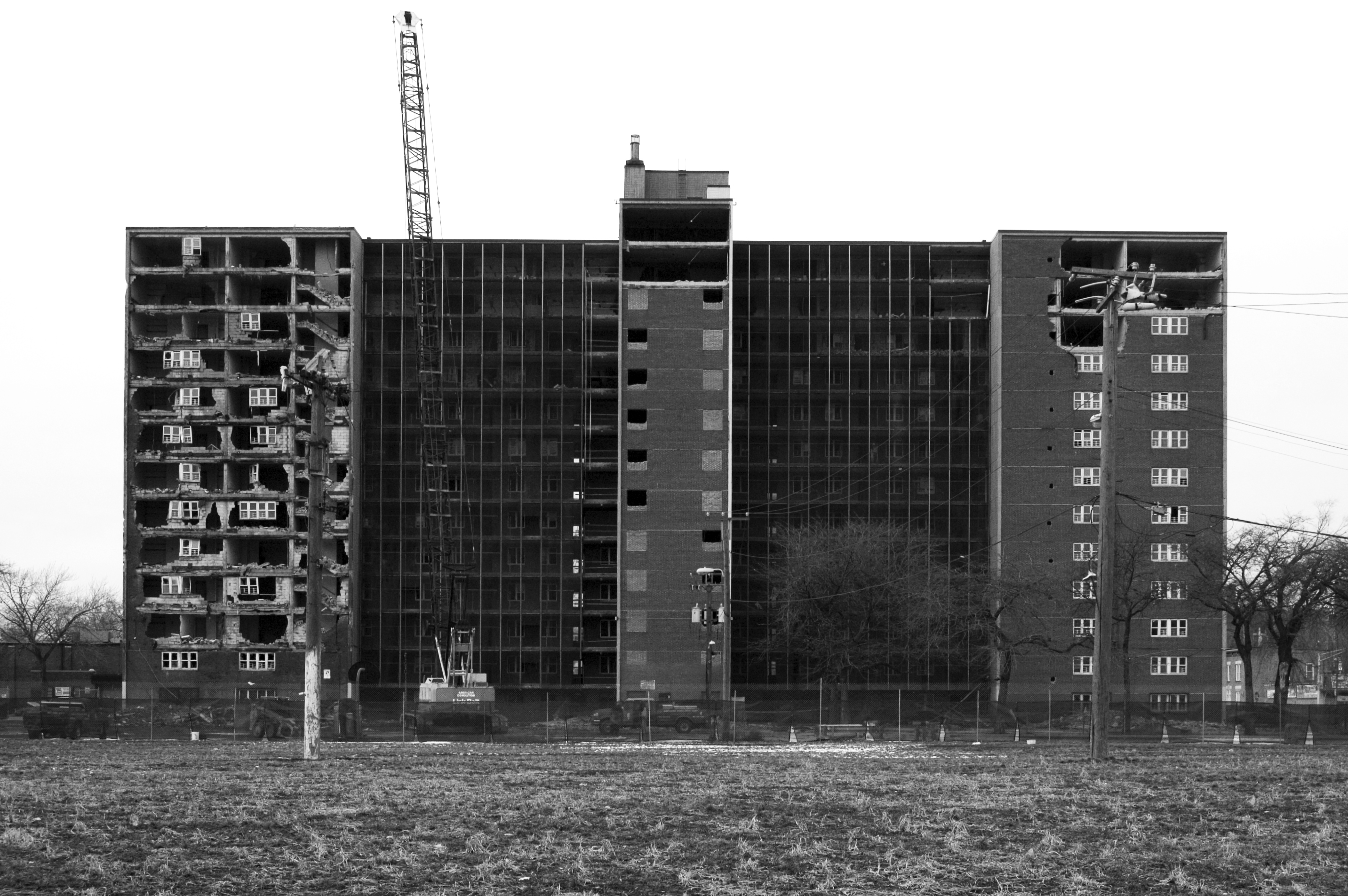
- Rockwell Gardens during demolition
- Interactive map of Rockwell Gardens

General information
- Location: Chicago, Illinois; United States
- Coordinates: 41°52′36″N 87°41′22″W
- Status: Demolished

Construction
- Constructed: 1958–1959

Listing
- Demolished: 2000–2006

Other information
- Governing body: Chicago Housing Authority

Rockwell Gardens was a Chicago Housing Authority (CHA) public housing project located in the East Garfield Park neighborhood on the West Side of Chicago, Illinois, United States. It was the first public housing development in the United States to be constructed using both federal and state funds. The original structures were designed by Nicol & Nicol and covered 17 acres (6.9 ha). 1,126 units of land. The second complex (Maplewood Courts) were located along Jackson Blvd and were standard Walk-up units in row like formations. This section is now a park as of 2014. The entire complex was located approximately 2.5 miles (4.0 km) west of the Chicago Loop, bordered by Madison Street, Van Buren Street, Western Avenue, and Rockwell Street.

== Operation Clean Sweep ==
In the late 1980s, Rockwell Gardens was a part of Chicago's "Operation Clean Sweep". This was a comprehensive government and police operation to clear city housing projects of the rampant gang activity, drug dealers, and other violent criminals who were a constant problem. The ultimate failure of this (and previous) cleanup programs eventually led to the Chicago Housing Authority's plan in the 1990s to demolish and redevelop city projects.

== Redevelopment ==
Rockwell Gardens is a part of the Chicago Housing Authority's "Plan for Transformation", which encompasses a complete demolition and reconstruction of virtually all public housing projects in the city of Chicago into mixed-income communities. Demolition and complete redevelopment began in 2000, intended to provide a total of 750 housing units, of which 264 are reserved for current CHA residents. Demolition was completed in 2006.
