= Tyson Clabo =

American football player (born 1981)

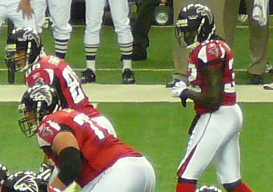
- Clabo with Jason Rader and Jerious Norwood

No. 77, 74
- Position: Offensive tackle

Personal information
- Born: October 17, 1981 (age 45); Knoxville, Tennessee, U.S.
- Listed height: 6 ft 6 in (1.98 m)
- Listed weight: 315 lb (143 kg)

Career information
- High school: Farragut (Farragut, Tennessee)
- College: Wake Forest
- NFL draft: 2004: undrafted

Career history
- Denver Broncos (2004)*; New York Giants (2004)*; San Diego Chargers (2004)*; Denver Broncos (2004); Hamburg Sea Devils (2005); Atlanta Falcons (2005–2012); Miami Dolphins (2013); Houston Texans (2014)
- * Offseason or practice squad member only

Awards and highlights
- Pro Bowl (2010); Atlanta Falcons All-Decade Team (2010–2019); First-team All-ACC (2003)

Career NFL statistics
- Games played: 132
- Games started: 116
- Fumble recoveries: 1
- Stats at Pro Football Reference

Tyson Clabo (born October 17, 1981) is an American former professional football player who was an offensive tackle in the National Football League (NFL). He was signed by the Denver Broncos as an undrafted free agent in 2004. He was also a member of the New York Giants, San Diego Chargers, Hamburg Sea Devils, Atlanta Falcons, Miami Dolphins, and Houston Texans. He played college football for the Wake Forest Demon Deacons.

Clabo is the nephew of retired NFL punter Neil Clabo.

== Early life ==
Clabo attended Farragut High School in Farragut, Tennessee, and lettered in football and basketball. In football, he was a two-time All-Conference selection, and as a senior, he was also named as an All-Region selection, an All-east Tennessee selection, and as an All-State selection.

== College career ==
Clabo played football at Wake Forest. Clabo started all 11 games at left tackle as a sophomore, and he was the only underclassman to start every contest that year. Clabo started all 13 games as a junior and moved to left guard after playing tackle in 2001, helping the Deacon ground game lead the ACC in rushing for the second-straight year. He started the final 36 games of his college career and a total of 37 contests of 47 games played at Wake Forest. Clabo earned first-team All-Atlantic Conference honors as a senior. In 2018 he was inducted into the Wake Forest Sports Hall of Fame.

== Professional career ==
=== Denver Broncos ===
Clabo originally signed with Denver Broncos as an undrafted rookie free agent and was waived by the Broncos during the 2004–05 offseason.

=== New York Giants ===
Clabo signed with the New York Giants as a practice squad member.

=== San Diego Chargers ===
Clabo signed with the San Diego Chargers as a practice squad member.

=== Atlanta Falcons ===
Clabo eventually was signed to the Falcons practice squad in September 2005 and re-signed by the Falcons team in January 2006.

Clabo started all 16 games and was a 2010 Pro Bowl selection.

On July 29, 2011, Clabo signed a five-year contract with the Atlanta Falcons. He started in all 16 games in the 2011 season.

In 2012, Clabo started every regular season game at right tackle for the fifth consecutive year including the two playoff games against Seattle and San Francisco. At the end of the season, Clabo received two all-pro votes for his play.

On April 4, 2013, Clabo was released by the Falcons. Clabo ended his career with the Falcons after 7 years and 101 starts, currently putting him 58th in franchise history. Between 2008 and 2012, Clabo started every single game and anchored an offensive line for 4 playoff teams. In July 2020, Clabo was named to the Atlanta Falcons all-decade team alongside longtime left tackle Jake Matthews.

=== Miami Dolphins ===
On May 5, 2013, Clabo signed with the Miami Dolphins. He appeared in and started 15 games in the 2013 season.

=== Houston Texans ===
On July 23, 2014, Clabo signed with the Houston Texans. He appeared in all 16 games for the Texans in the 2014 season. A majority of his offensive line snaps came in Week 16 against the Baltimore Ravens.
