= Farragut, Tennessee =

Farragut
- Town
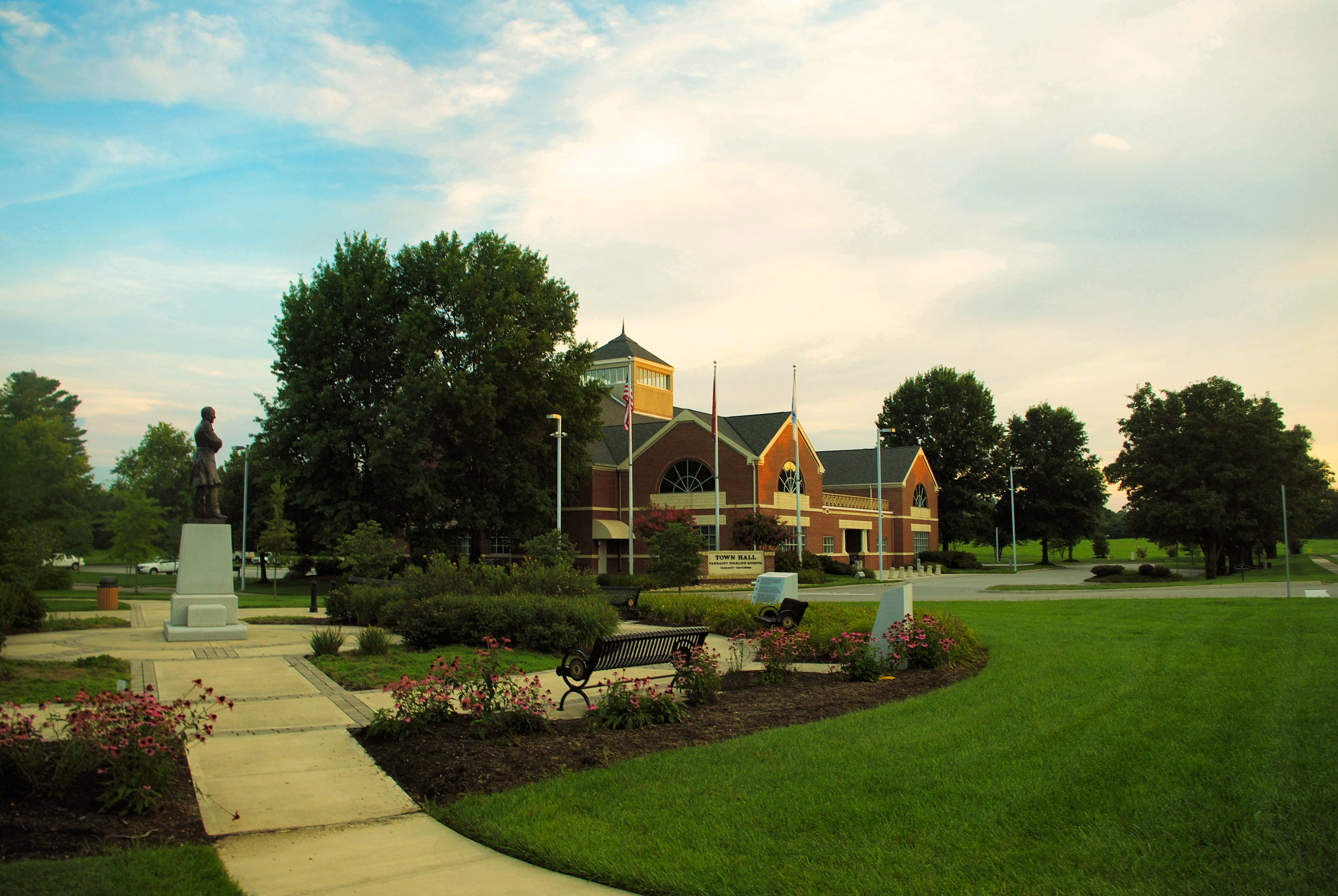
- Farragut Town Hall and Folklife Museum

- Flag Logo

- Location of Farragut in Knox and Loudon counties.
- Coordinates: 35°52′23″N 84°10′56″W
- Country: United States
- State: Tennessee
- Counties: Knox, Loudon
- Settled: 1787
- Incorporated: 1980
- Named for: David Farragut

Government
  - Type: Mayor-council
  - Mayor: Ron Williams
  - Vice Mayor: Scott Meyer
  - Town Council: List of Aldermen: Louise Povlin; Drew Burnette; Scott Meyer; Ron Pinchok

Area
  - Total: 16.14 sq mi (41.80 km^{2})
  - Land: 15.98 sq mi (41.38 km^{2})
  - Water: 0.16 sq mi (0.42 km^{2})
- Elevation: 958 ft (292 m)

Population (2020)
  - Total: 23,506
  - Density: 1,471.1/sq mi (568.01/km^{2})
- Time zone: UTC-5 (Eastern (EST))
  - Summer (DST): UTC-4 (EDT)
- ZIP code: 37922 and 37934
- Area code: 865
- FIPS code: 47-25760
- GNIS feature ID: 2406494
- Website: www.townoffarragut.org

Farragut is a suburban town located primarily in Knox County, Tennessee, with a small extension into Loudon County, Tennessee. The town's population was 23,506 at the 2020 census. It is included in the Knoxville Metropolitan Area. The town is named in honor of Union Admiral David Farragut, who was born just east of Farragut at Campbell's Station in 1801, and fought in the American Civil War.

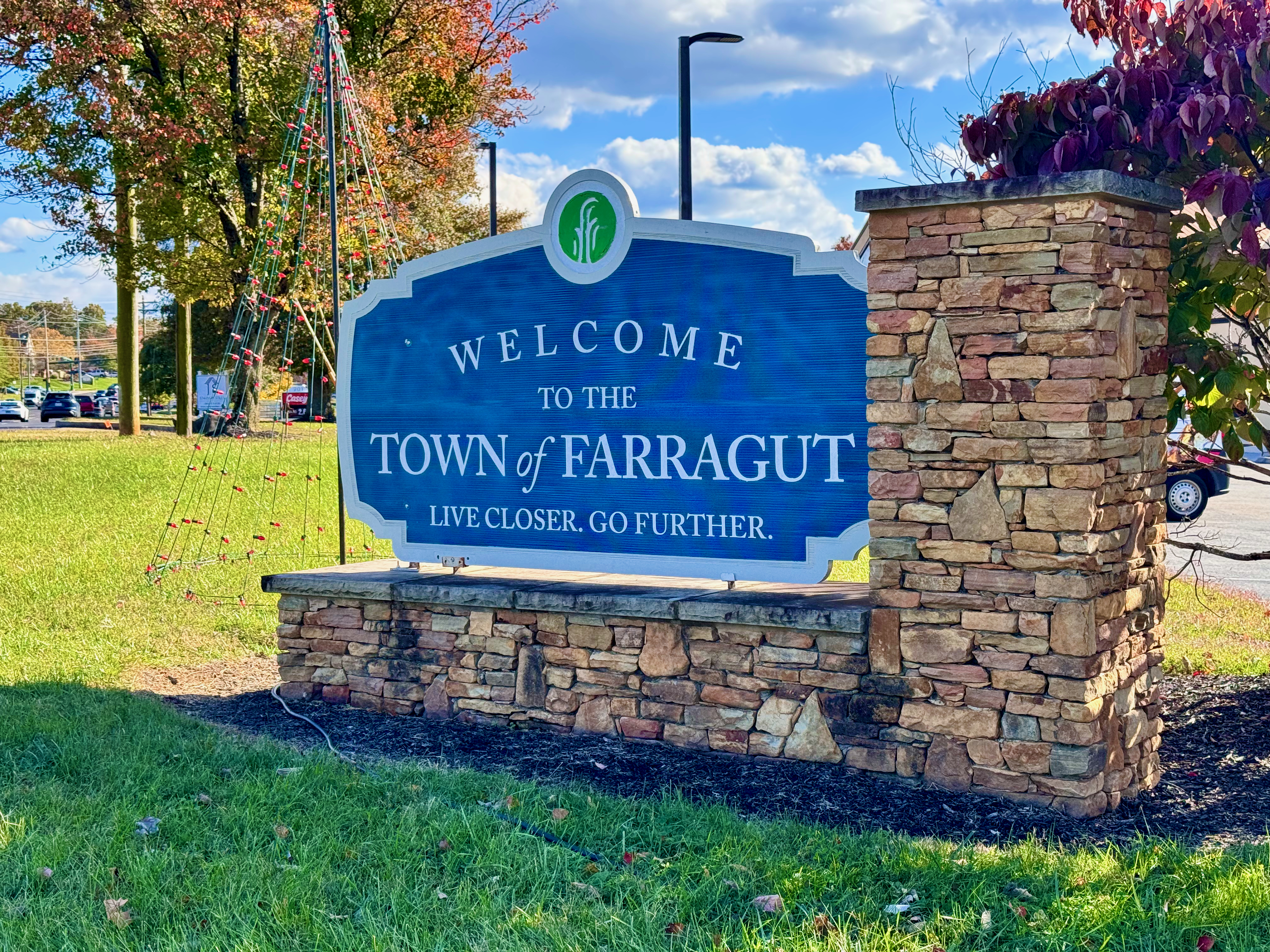
Farragut welcome sign

== History ==
The area was originally known as Campbell's Station after a fort and stage coach station erected by Captain David Campbell (1753–1832) in 1787. The brick Campbell's Station Inn was built in 1810 and still stands on Kingston Pike within sight of the Farragut Town Hall. The Civil War Battle of Campbell's Station was fought there on November 16, 1863.

The historic unincorporated village of Concord (listed on the National Register of Historic Places) was founded in 1854 just east of what would become the eastern boundary of Farragut. Concord is located on the main rail line to Atlanta and main channel of the Tennessee River, and was an important transloading center for the Tennessee marble industry in the late 19th century. Picturesque buildings, antebellum homes as well as several very old churches sit along the river.

The original Farragut High School was built by the community in 1904, and moved to its current location in 1976. Some parts of Farragut are zoned for Hardin Valley Academy in the neighboring suburb of Hardin Valley, built in 2008.

In early December 1979, the Knoxville City Council would vote to annex right-of-way acreage of I-40 in the Farragut area, prompting community residents to petition an incorporation election. On January 16, 1980, Farragut would vote to incorporate as a town preventing further annexation by Knoxville, which was trying to shore up its tax base by annexing affluent communities along Kingston Pike. The effort was led by a group of citizens who called themselves the Farragut Community Group. The first mayor, Bob Leonard, was elected April 1, 1980, along with four aldermen. Alderman Eddy Ford became mayor in 1993 and served in that position until April 2009, when he failed to win re-election, losing to Dr. Ralph McGill, an original founders of the town government.

== Geography ==
According to the United States Census Bureau, the town has a total area of 16.2 square miles (42.1 km^{2}), of which 16.1 square miles (41.7 km^{2}) is land and 0.2 square mile (0.4 km^{2}) (1.05%) is water.

The town of Farragut is bound to the north by I-40/75, except at Campbell's Station Road, Snyder Road, and the Outlets Drive area; to the south by Turkey Creek Road and the Norfolk Southern Railroad line; to the west at the Loudon County line; and to the east by Lovell Road (on the north side of Kingston Pike and Thornton Heights) and Concord Hills subdivisions (on the south side of Kingston Pike).

Farragut is situated in a hilly area between Blackoak Ridge to the north and the Tennessee River (Fort Loudoun Lake) to the south. Its municipal area is mostly located south of the merged Interstate 40 (I-40)/I-75, with the exception of a few neighborhoods. Kingston Pike, a merged stretch of U.S. Route 70 (US 70) and US 11, traverses the town. Concord lies immediately southeast of Farragut, and Hardin Valley lies opposite Blackoak Ridge to the north. The unincorporated community of Dixie Lee Junction lies along Kingston Pike, just across the Loudon County line.

== Demographics ==
Historical population
Census	Pop.	Note	%±
1990	12,793		—
2000	17,720		38.5%
2010	20,676		16.7%
2020	23,506		13.7%
2025 (est.)	25,121	▲	6.9%

=== 2020 census ===
As of the 2020 census, Farragut had a population of 23,506 and 6,744 families residing in the town. The median age was 46.7 years. 23.3% of residents were under the age of 18 and 23.7% of residents were 65 years of age or older. For every 100 females there were 93.3 males, and for every 100 females age 18 and over there were 90.6 males age 18 and over.

99.1% of residents lived in urban areas, while 0.9% lived in rural areas.

There were 8,521 households in Farragut, of which 34.6% had children under the age of 18 living in them. Of all households, 70.8% were married-couple households, 9.2% were households with a male householder and no spouse or partner present, and 17.8% were households with a female householder and no spouse or partner present. About 18.0% of all households were made up of individuals and 11.1% had someone living alone who was 65 years of age or older.

There were 8,992 housing units, of which 5.2% were vacant. The homeowner vacancy rate was 1.5% and the rental vacancy rate was 14.3%.

Farragut racial composition
Race	Number	Percentage
White (non-Hispanic)	19,720	83.89%
Black or African American (non-Hispanic)	431	1.83%
Native American	30	0.13%
Asian	1,661	7.07%
Pacific Islander	8	0.03%
Other/Mixed	869	3.7%
Hispanic or Latino	787	3.35%

=== 2000 census ===
As of the 2000 census, there were 17,720 people, 6,333 households, and 5,231 families residing in the town. The population density was 1,101.5 inhabitants per square mile (425.3/km^{2}). There were 8,992 housing units at an average density of 412.0 per square mile (159.1/km^{2}). The racial makeup of the town was 93.88% White, 1.80% African American, 0.15% Native American, 3.16% Asian, 0.33% from other races, and 0.69% from two or more races. Hispanic or Latino of any race were 1.07% of the population.

There were 6,333 households, out of which 39.4% had children under the age of 18 living with them, 76.0% were married couples living together, 5.0% had a female householder with no husband present, and 17.4% were non-families. 15.2% of all households were made up of individuals, and 5.5% had someone living alone who was 65 years of age or older. The average household size was 2.76 and the average family size was 3.08.

In the town, the population was spread out, with 26.7% under the age of 18, 5.3% from 18 to 24, 24.4% from 25 to 44, 32.2% from 45 to 64, and 11.4% who were 65 years of age or older. The median age was 42 years. For every 100 females, there were 97.8 males. For every 100 females age 18 and over, there were 94.4 males.

=== Income and poverty ===
The median income for a household in the town was $135,725, and the median income for a family was $91,423 as of 2020. Males had a median income of $70,873 versus $34,955 for females. The per capita income for the town was $66,779. About 2.6% of families and 2.9% of the population were below the poverty line, including 2.9% of those under age 18 and 4.1% of those age 65 or over.

== Historic sites ==
- Avery Russell House

== Education ==
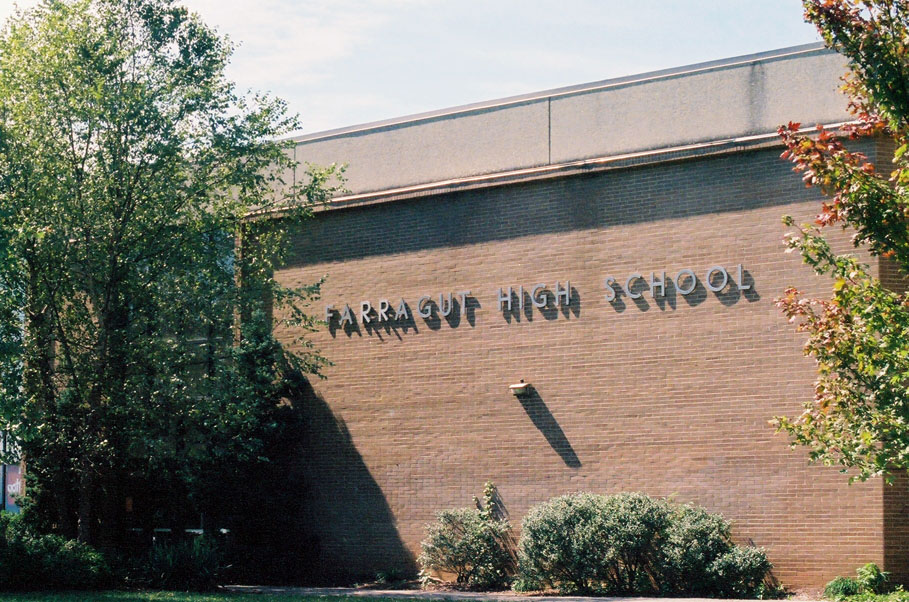
Farragut High School

These schools are a part of Knox County Schools.

Elementary schools for Farragut:

- Farragut Primary School (K-2)
- Farragut Intermediate School (3-5)
- Northshore Elementary School (K-5)

Most of Farragut is zoned to the following:

- Farragut Middle School (6-8)
- Farragut High School (9-12)

Although the schools are not in the town limits, Hardin Valley Middle School serves parts of Farragut north of Interstate 75 for grades 6-8, and Hardin Valley Academy serves that same portion for grades 9-12.

There are two private schools, Knoxville Christian School and Concord Christian School.

== Notable people ==
- Bill Bates, former NFL player and coach
- Tyson Clabo, former NFL player
- Nicky Delmonico, former Major League Baseball player and current Minor League Baseball coach
- David Farragut, Civil War (Union) admiral
- Robert Ben Garant, actor, comedian, writer, director, and producer
- Michael McKenry, former Major League Baseball player
- Tim Priest, attorney and Vol Network color commentator
- Archibald Roane, second Governor of Tennessee
- Nick Senzel, Major League Baseball player
- Jerry Sisk Jr., co-founder of Jewelry Television
- Kyle Waldrop, former Major League Baseball player
- Mitchell W. Stout, Medal of Honor recipient

== Media ==
- WFIV-FM
- Farragut Press
- Farragut Life Magazine
