= Concord, Tennessee =

- Unincorporated community
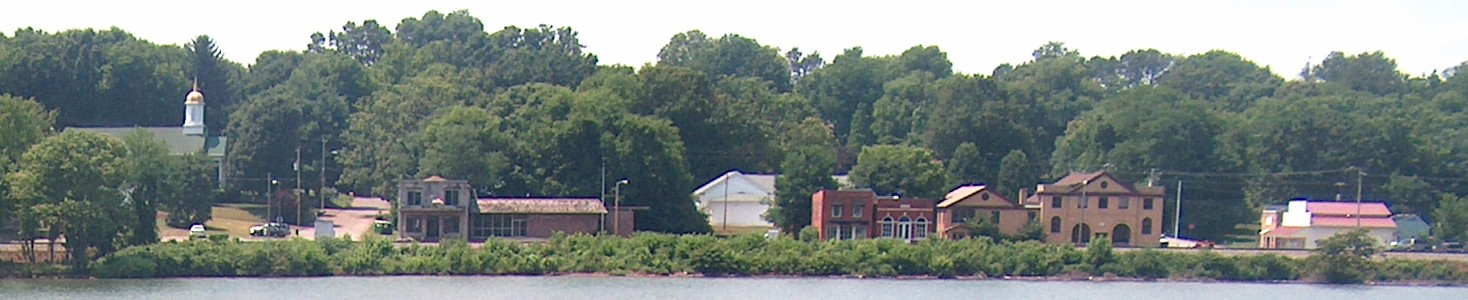

- Location in Tennessee and the United States Concord (the United States)
- Coordinates: 35°52′07″N 84°08′31″W
- Country: United States
- State: Tennessee
- County: Knox
- Named after: Concord Presbyterian Church

Government
  - Type: County commission
  - Mayor: Glenn Jacobs (R)
  - Commissioners: Angela Russell (R) (District 5); Kim Frazier (R) (At-Large); Larsen Jay (R) (At-Large)
- Elevation: 850 ft (260 m)
- Time zone: UTC-5 (Eastern (EST))
  - Summer (DST): UTC-4 (EDT)
- GNIS feature ID: 1281059

- Concord Village Historic District
- U.S. National Register of Historic Places
- U.S. Historic district
- Location within Tennessee Location within the United States
- Location: Roughly bounded by Lakeridge & Third Drs., Spring St., & the Masonic Hall & Cemetery, Concord, Tennessee
- Area: 40 acres (16 ha)
- Architect: Multiple
- NRHP reference No.: 87001888
- Added to NRHP: October 22, 1987

Concord is an unincorporated community in Knox County, Tennessee, United States and is listed on the National Register of Historic Places as a historic district, the Concord Village Historic District. The United States Geographic Names Information System classifies Concord as a populated place. It is located in western Knox County, east of Farragut and west of Knoxville. Mail destined for Concord is now addressed to Concord, Knoxville, or Farragut.

== History ==
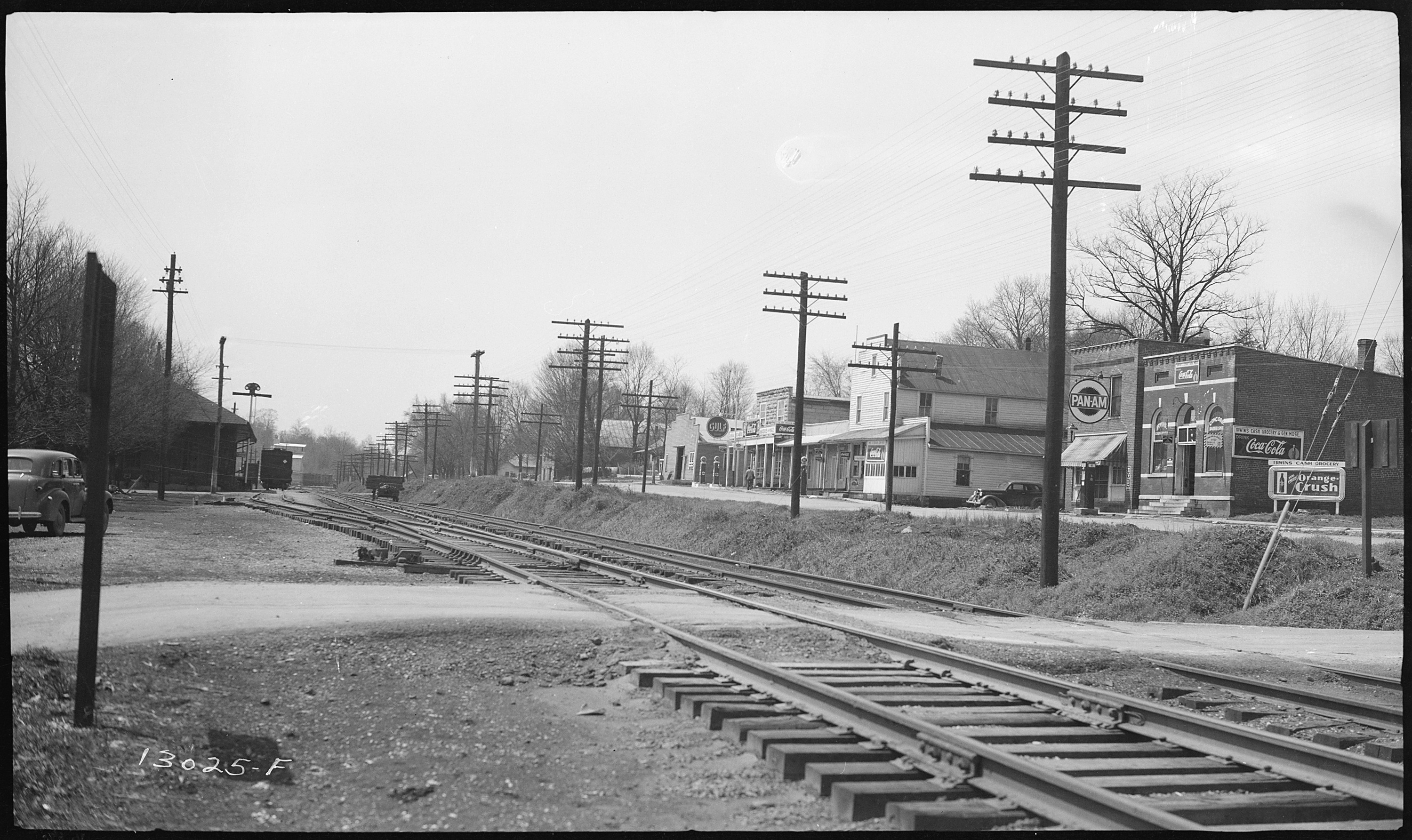
Concord in 1942

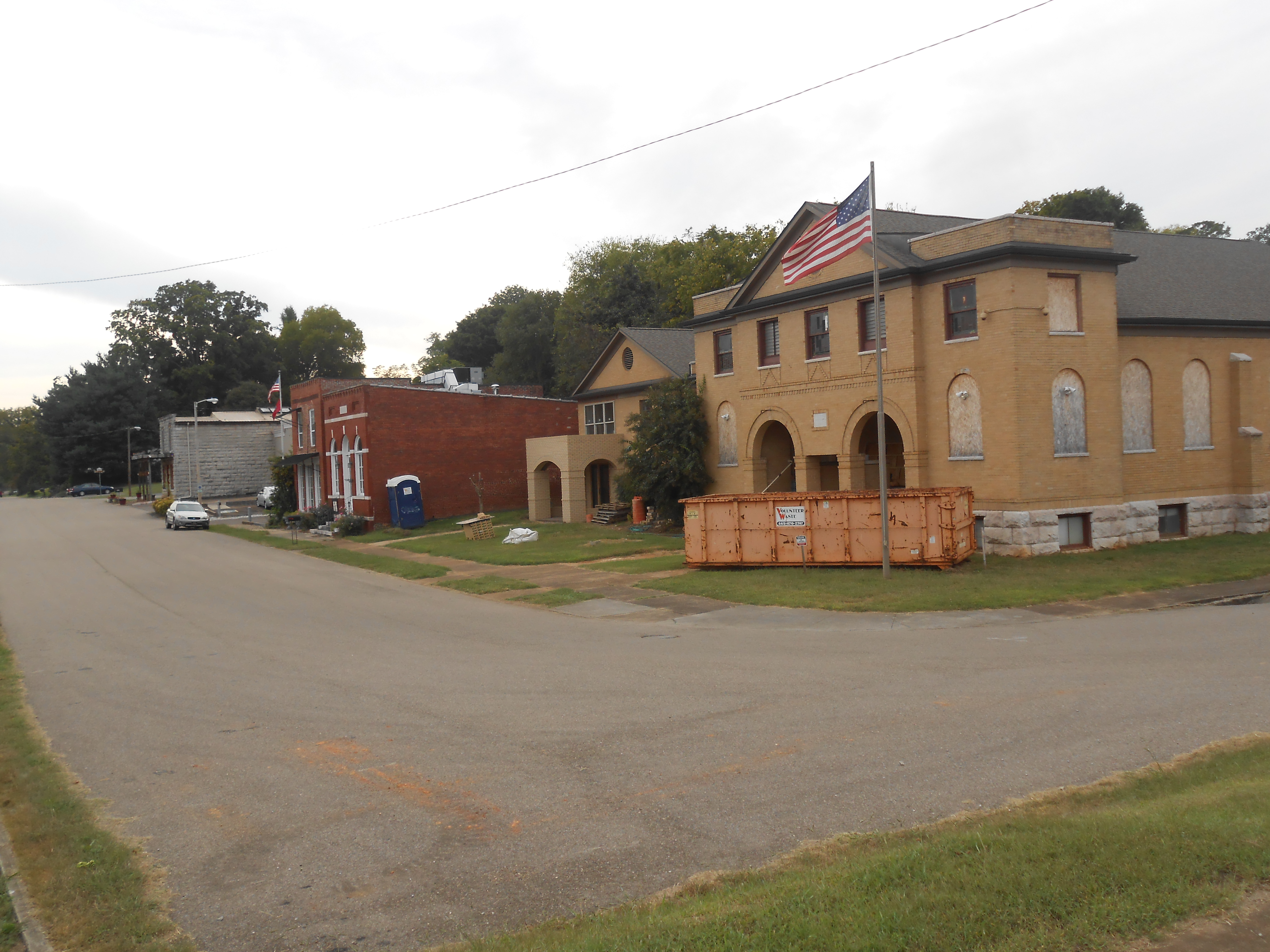
Concord today

The Village of Concord began to develop in 1854. Before that time, the area was sparsely settled. Large farms were centered on the Tennessee River, and relied on a nearby settlement, Campbell's Station (modern Farragut), for trade and other urban needs. In 1853, construction of the East Tennessee and Georgia Railroad along the north bank of the Tennessee River caused a population and development shift to the area that became Concord.

Concord was founded and platted in 1854 on land owned by James M. Rodgers. Rodgers laid out 55 lots, and named the new town Concord. It is believed the name was inspired by the nearby Concord Cumberland Presbyterian Church, of which Rodgers was a member ("Concord" being a common name for churches at the time). He began to sell lots in 1855, but later moved to California. Shortly before he moved, he bought several large tracts of land, some of which are still intact in some sections of the village.

Concord developed rapidly after the arrival of the railroad. The first dwelling in Concord, a boarding house, was built by Shadrack Callaway (First Post Master in Concord). Combining the existing river transportation with the railroad made Concord the nucleus of several communities on the north side of the river, including Campbell's Station, Loveville and Ebenezer.

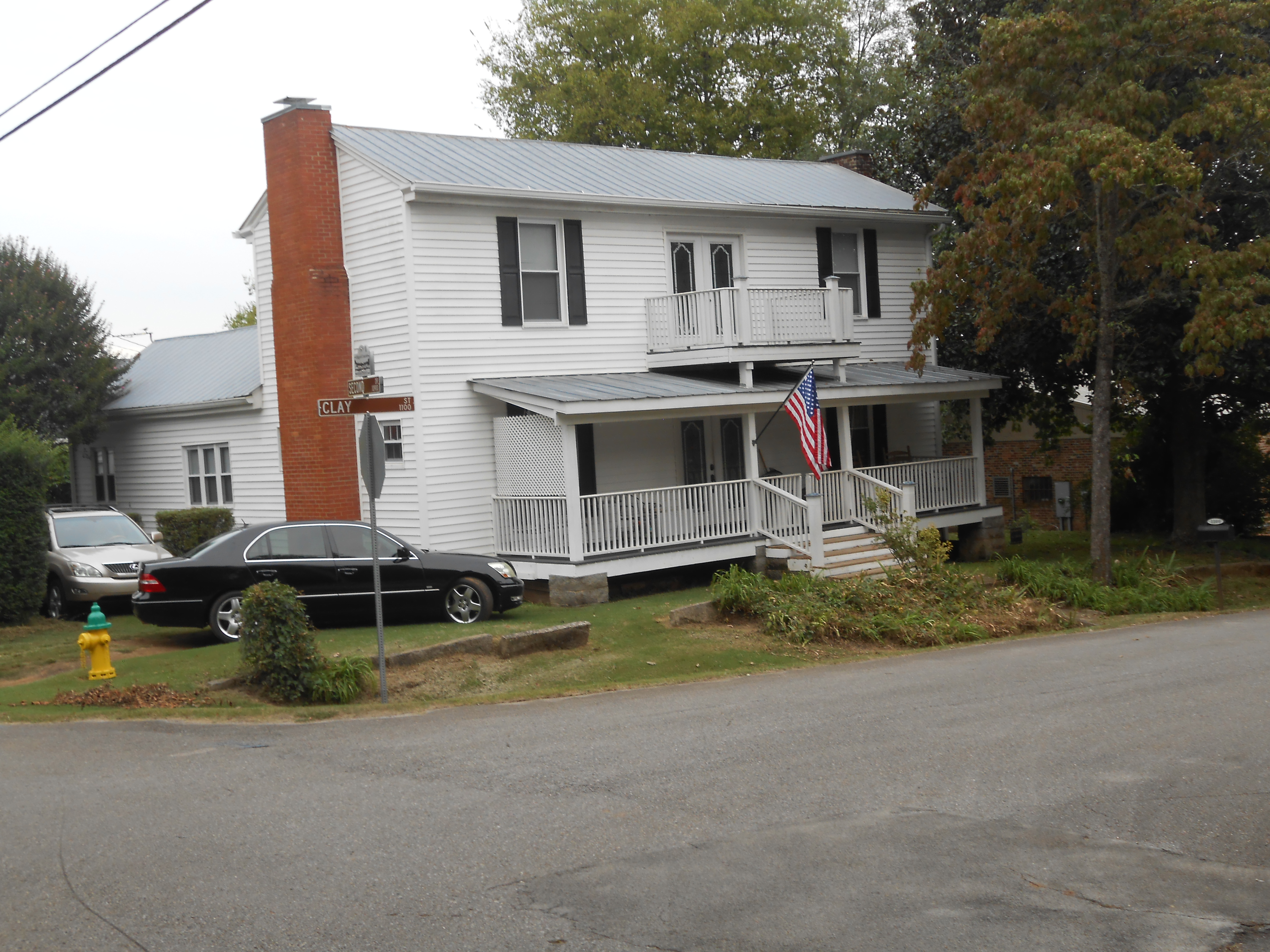
house at Clay Street & 2nd Drive

On the eve of the Civil War, Congressman T.A.R. Nelson and Knoxville attorney Oliver Perry Temple, both Union supporters, delivered anti-secession speeches before hostile crowds at Concord. During the war, in the fall of 1863 prior to the Battle of Campbell's Station, the 24th Kentucky Infantry and the 103rd Ohio Infantry camped near Concord.

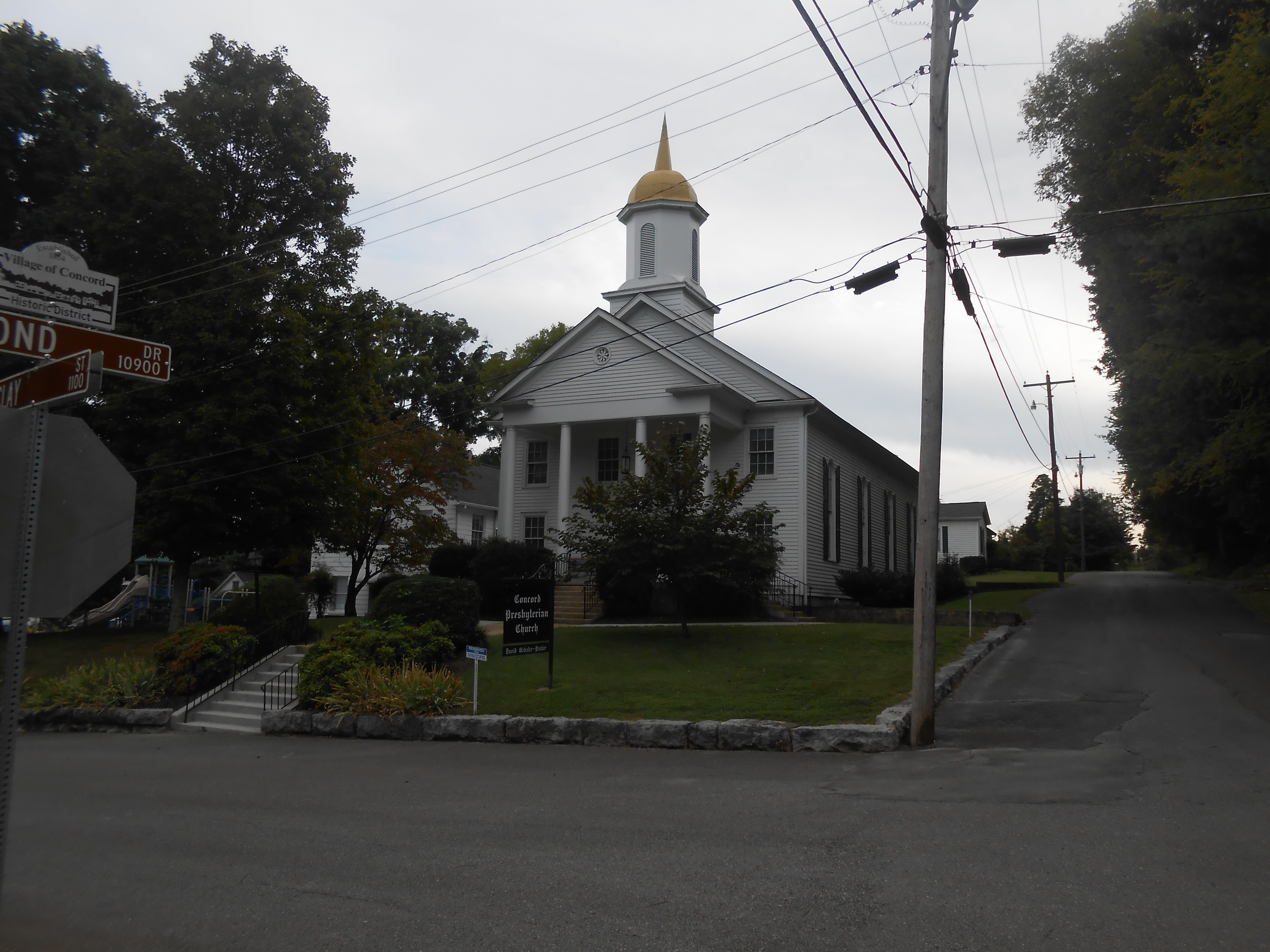
Concord Presbyterian Church

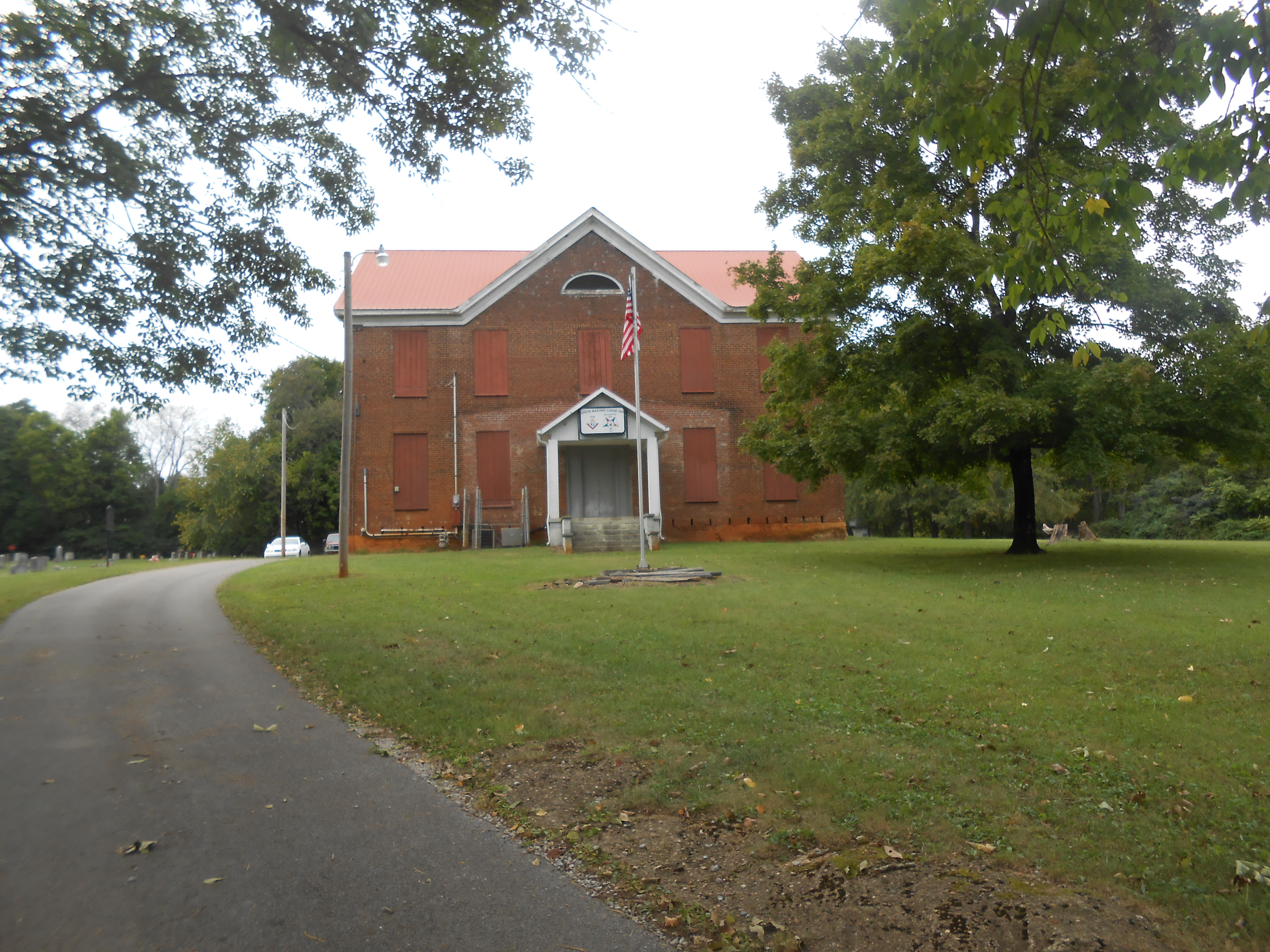
Masonic lodge

During this time supplies were appropriated from several area farms including Callaway's Landing and the Pleasant Forest Cumberland Presbyterian Church one mile north of Concord was dismantled. The bricks were used to build fireplaces for the Union Army.

The railroad also created a transportation market with communities in Blount County, including Friendsville and Louisville, which were connected to Concord by ferry, but were not to have rail transportation until the 1890s. The steamboat traveling from Chattanooga to Knoxville and back stopped at Callaway's Landing, hence the name, connecting Concord to Knoxville.

In the 1880s, Concord became the center of a large Tennessee marble production industry. Several quarries were located near the Holston (now Tennessee) River in Calloway's Ridge. The town also became the center of marble shipping. Quarries in the Louisville and Friendsville area, on the south side of the river, shipped Tennessee marble to Concord to take advantage of the town's rail connections. In 1883, four marble companies were operating: the Lima and East Tennessee Company, Stamps Wood & Company, the Stewart Company and the Republic Company.

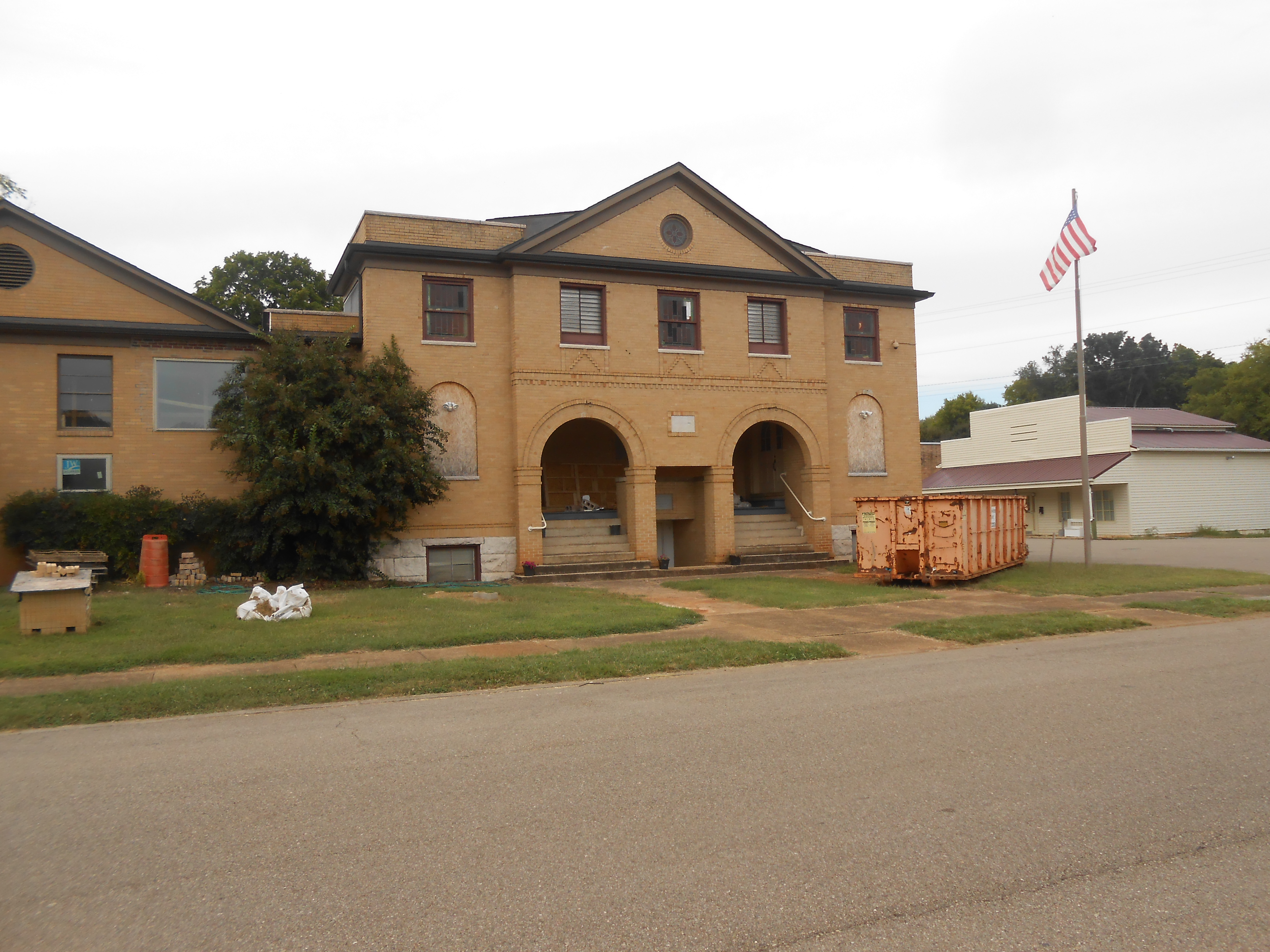
former Concord Baptist Church

The Juanita Company built a mill for sawing and polishing marble; the facility became the property of Enterprise Marble Company in 1886. The last company to quarry marble extensively was the Enterprise Marble Company. None of the buildings associated with the marble industry in Concord remain today; many were flooded when Fort Loudon Lake was impounded. Only the foundation on which a crusher sat remains; the crusher was used to produce terrazzo chips. The crusher foundation is located in the Rocky Point area of Concord Park and is visible from Concord Road's railroad bridge looking east.

By 1887, Concord was the second largest community in Knox County, second to Knoxville. The Village of Concord was a regional transportation center. Tennessee marble, crushed limestone, lime, logs, and farm produce were gathered at its public dock. Passenger ferries and commercial boats landed there. The railroad provided passenger connections to Knoxville and other cities. In addition to rail transportation, a paved road from Lenoir City to Knoxville traveled along the railroad from Lenoir City to what is now Olive Road. The road then followed what is now Olive Road to Loop Road, then to Concord Road and then north two miles to Kingston Pike. Kingston Pike was the main east–west road out of Knoxville from the early 19th century until Interstate 40/75 was completed through the area in the 1960s. This road network provided all-weather connections to other highways in the area.

In the early 20th century, the town had grown to include several general stores, a brickyard, lime kiln, inn, a saloon, two livery stables, an undertaking establishment, two flour mills, a railroad depot, private schools, a bank, a post office, an ice cream parlor, a drug store, specialty shops, a barber shop and churches. In 1916, fire destroyed much of the business district but it was quickly rebuilt.

The Great Depression of the 1930s brought economic hardship to Concord. New building materials lessened the use of Tennessee marble, and caused the marble industry to go into a decline from which it never recovered. The impoundment of Fort Loudon Lake inundated about one-third of the town (most of the business district) by 1944. Portions of the railroad were relocated to higher adjacent ground and continued to carry freight, but did not provide passenger service. The development of automobiles and new transportation routes also contributed to Concord's slow growth.

In the 1970s, the area began to rebound economically as it became a bedroom community for the fast-growing city of Knoxville. Since then, residential development and land subdivision has continued apace, transforming Concord and its environs into an affluent urban community that has left behind much of its rural roots.
