= Patriot League baseball tournament =

- Conference baseball championship
- Sport: Baseball
- Conference: Patriot League
- Number of teams: 4
- Format: Best-of-three series
- Played: 1993–present
- Last contest: 2026
- Current champion: Holy Cross (3)
- Most championships: Army (13)
- Official website: website

The Patriot League baseball tournament is the conference baseball championship of the NCAA Division I Patriot League. The top four finishers in the regular season of the conference's six teams advance to the best of three championship series, with each series hosted by the higher seeded team. The winner of the tournament receives an automatic berth to the NCAA Division I Baseball Championship.

== Format ==
For the first two seasons, the tournament matched the winners of the Patriot League's two divisions in a best-of-three series. After the end of divisional play (which coincided with Colgate's departure) for the 1995 season, no event was held. The new incarnation in 1996 featured the top three teams meeting at the home of the regular season champion. The second and third seeds played a single game to determine who would face the top seed in a best of three series. In 2008, the format expanded to four teams and returned to the best of three series format for both the semifinal and final rounds.

== Champions ==
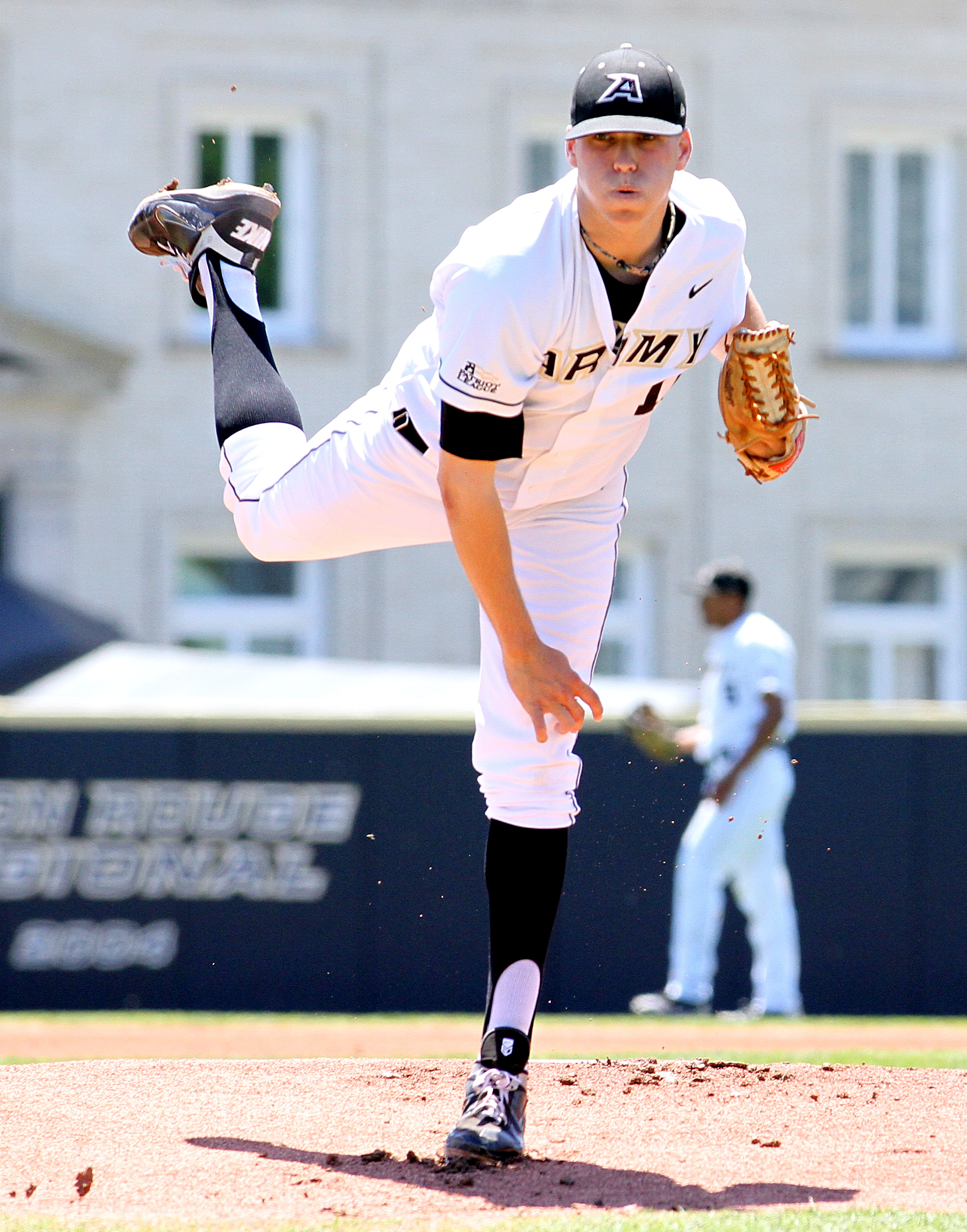
2013 Patriot League baseball tournament MVP Chris Rowley

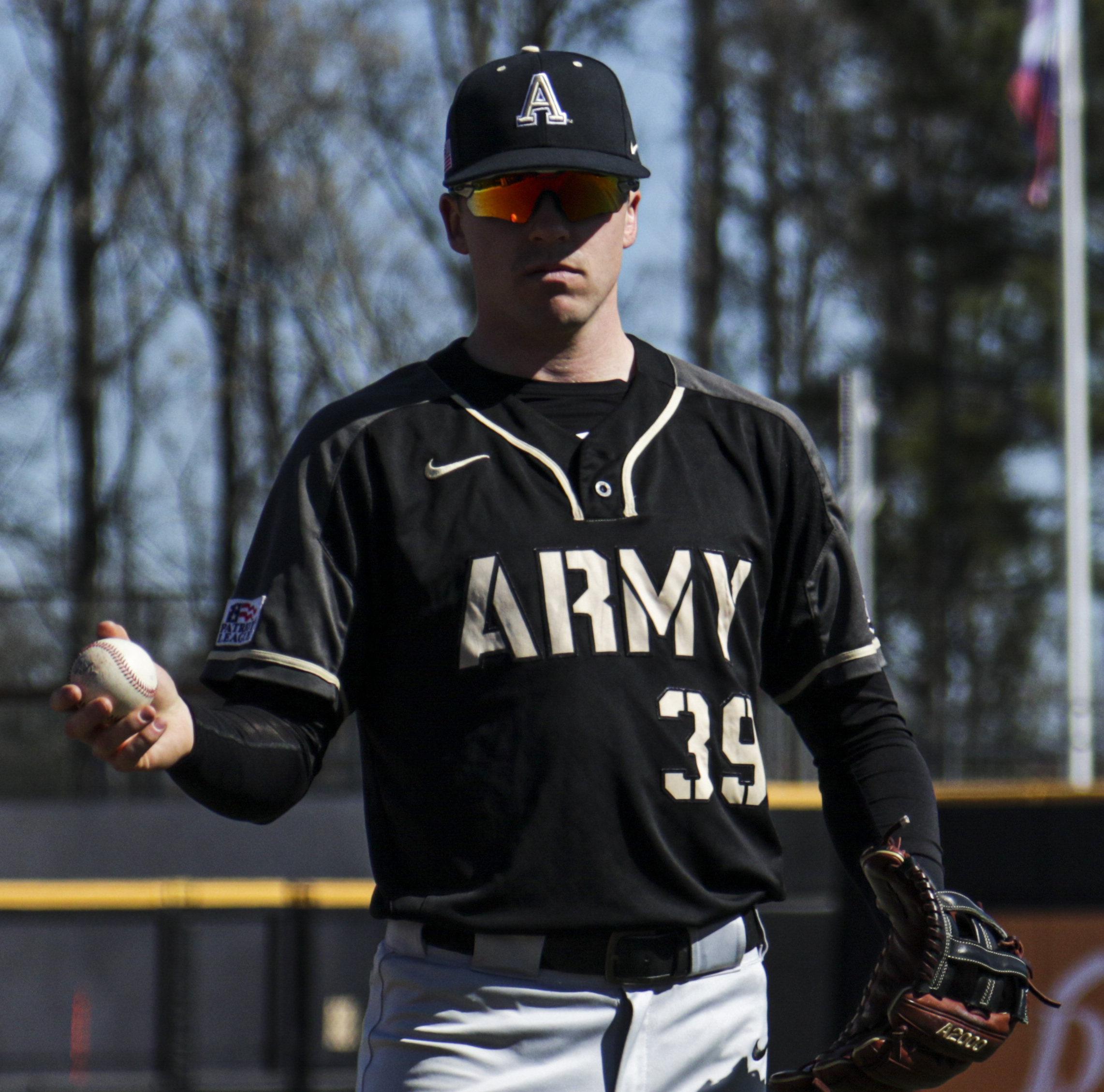
2019 Patriot League baseball tournament MVP Jacob Hurtubise

=== By year ===
The following is a list of conference champions listed by year.

Year	Champion	Runner-up	Venue	MVP
1993	Fordham	Navy	Houlihan Park • The Bronx, NY	Joe Schultz, Fordham
1994	Navy	Army	Max Bishop Stadium • Annapolis, MD	Steve Mauro, Navy
1995	No tournament held (Note: While no tournament was held, Navy, the regular season champion, was invited to the 1995 NCAA Division I baseball tournament)			
1996	Bucknell	Navy	Bucknell Field • Lewisburg, PA	Pete Cann, Bucknell
1997	Army	Bucknell	Johnson Stadium at Doubleday Field • West Point, NY	Bryan Price, Army
1998	Navy	Bucknell	Max Bishop Stadium • Annapolis, MD	Luke Braham, Navy
1999	Navy	Bucknell	Bucknell Field • Lewisburg, PA	Pat Klokow, Navy
2000	Army	Navy	Max Bishop Stadium • Annapolis, MD	Josh Minney, Army
2001	Bucknell	Navy	Max Bishop Stadium • Annapolis, MD	Brad Gething, Bucknell
2002	Navy	Lehigh	Max Bishop Stadium • Annapolis, MD	Matt Foster, Navy
2003	Bucknell	Navy	Eugene B. Depew Field • Lewisburg, PA	Brian Day, Bucknell
2004	Army	Lafayette	Johnson Stadium at Doubleday Field • West Point, NY	Justin Long, Army
2005	Army	Lehigh	Johnson Stadium at Doubleday Field • West Point, NY	Walker Gorham, Army
2006	Lehigh	Bucknell	Lehigh Baseball Field • Bethlehem, PA	Kyle Collina, Lehigh; Joe Matteo, Lehigh
2007	Lafayette	Army	Kamine Stadium • Easton, PA	Mike Raible, Lafayette
2008	Bucknell	Navy	Max Bishop Stadium • Annapolis, MD	Jason Buursma, Bucknell
2009	Army	Lafayette	Johnson Stadium at Doubleday Field • West Point, NY	Ben Koenigsfield, Army
2010	Bucknell	Holy Cross	Fitton Field • Worcester, MA	Doug Shribman, Bucknell
2011	Navy	Army	Max Bishop Stadium • Annapolis, MD	Ben Nelson, Navy
2012	Army	Holy Cross	Johnson Stadium at Doubleday Field • West Point, NY	Zach Price, Army
2013	Army	Holy Cross	Fitton Field • Worcester, MA	Chris Rowley, Army
2014	Bucknell	Lehigh	Eugene B. Depew Field • Lewisburg, PA	Joe Ogren, Bucknell
2015	Lehigh	Navy	Max Bishop Stadium • Annapolis, MD	Mike Garzillo, Lehigh
2016	Navy	Holy Cross	Max Bishop Stadium • Annapolis, MD	Leland Saile, Navy
2017	Holy Cross	Bucknell	Fitton Field • Worcester, MA	Brendan King, Holy Cross
2018	Army	Navy	Max Bishop Stadium • Annapolis, MD	Anthony Giachin, Army
2019	Army	Navy	Max Bishop Stadium • Annapolis, MD	Jacob Hurtubise, Army
2020	Cancelled due to the coronavirus pandemic			
2021	Army	Lehigh	Lehigh Baseball Field • Bethlehem, PA	Ross Friedrick, Army
2022	Army	Bucknell	Johnson Stadium at Doubleday Field • West Point, NY	Sam Ruta, Army
2023	Army	Bucknell	Johnson Stadium at Doubleday Field • West Point, NY	Kevin Dubrule, Army
2024	Army	Navy	Johnson Stadium at Doubleday Field • West Point, NY	Matthew Ronnebaum, Army
2025	Holy Cross	Army	Fitton Field • Worcester, MA	Danny Macchiarola, Holy Cross
2026	Holy Cross	Bucknell	Eugene B. Depew Field • Lewisburg, PA	Jaden Wywoda, Holy Cross

=== By school ===
The following is a list of conference champions listed by school.

Program	Championships	Years
Army	13	1997, 2000, 2004, 2005, 2009, 2012, 2013, 2018, 2019, 2021, 2022, 2023, 2024
Bucknell	6	1996, 2001, 2003, 2008, 2010, 2014
Navy	6	1994, 1998, 1999, 2002, 2011, 2016
Holy Cross	3	2017, 2025, 2026
Lehigh	2	2006, 2015
Fordham	1	1993
Lafayette	1	2007

- Italics indicate that the program no longer fields a baseball team in the Patriot League.
