= Joe Kinney (baseball) =

American baseball player and coach

Playing career
- 1985–1988: Lehigh
- Position: Outfielder

Coaching career (HC unless noted)
- 1989: Maplewood (NJ) Columbia (JV)
- 1990–1992: Lehigh (asst)
- 1993–1999: Navy (asst)
- 2000–2020: Lafayette

Head coaching record
- Overall: 358–593–5
- Tournaments: Patriot: 7–16; NCAA: 0–2

Accomplishments and honors

Championships
- Patriot League (2007); Patriot League tournament (2007)

Joseph A. Kinney III is an American baseball coach and former outfielder. He played college baseball at Lehigh for coach Stan Schultz from 1985–1988. He then served as the head coach of the Lafayette Leopards (2000–2020).

== Playing career ==
Raised in Maplewood, New Jersey, Kinney attended Columbia High School, where he played baseball and football before graduating in 1984. Upon graduation from high school, Kinney enrolled at Lehigh University and majored in economics.

As a freshman at Lehigh University in 1985, Kinney had a .332 batting average, a .402 on-base percentage (OBP) and a .441 SLG.

As a sophomore in 1986, Kinney batted .274 with a .387 SLG, 2 home run, and 6 RBIs.

In the 1987 season as a junior, Kinney hit 2 home runs and had 10 hits.

Kinney served as a team captain as a senior.

== Coaching career ==
On September 19, 1999, Kinney was named the head coach of the Lafayette Leopards baseball program.

Kinney's 2007 team won the Patriot League as well as the 2007 Patriot League baseball tournament, the team's first NCAA Regional berth since 1990.

Kinney announced the fall of 2019, that the 2020 season would be his last before retiring.

== Head coaching record ==
Statistics overview
Season	Team	Overall	Conference	Standing	Postseason
Lafayette Leopards (Patriot League) (2000–2020)
2000	Lafayette	12–27	6–16	6th	
2001	Lafayette	10–30	5–15	6th	
2002	Lafayette	23–22	12–8	3rd	Patriot tournament
2003	Lafayette	16–24	7–13	6th	
2004	Lafayette	23–25	11–9	2nd	Patriot tournament
2005	Lafayette	18–26–1	6–10	4th	
2006	Lafayette	27–24	11–9	3rd	Patriot tournament
2007	Lafayette	34–20	17–3	1st	NCAA Regional
2008	Lafayette	25–23	8–12	5th	
2009	Lafayette	24–29	9–11	4th	Patriot tournament
2010	Lafayette	15–30	7–13	5th	
2011	Lafayette	18–30–1	10–10	T-3rd	Patriot tournament
2012	Lafayette	14–37–1	7–13	T-4th	Patriot tournament
2013	Lafayette	10–40	6–14	5th	
2014	Lafayette	15–26	5–13	5th	
2015	Lafayette	14–27–1	9–11	4th	Patriot tournament
2016	Lafayette	14–29	7–13	5th	
2017	Lafayette	8–44	4–17	6th	
2018	Lafayette	16–34–1	4–20–1	6th	
2019	Lafayette	19–33	12–13	4th	Patriot tournament
2020	Lafayette	4–10	0–0		Season canceled due to COVID-19
Lafayette:		358–593–5	163-243-1		
Total:		358–593–5			
National champion Postseason invitational champion Conference regular season champion Conference regular season and conference tournament champion Division regular season champion Division regular season and conference tournament champion Conference tournament champion
