= Greg DiCenzo =

Current position
- Title: Manager
- Team: Akron RubberDucks
- Conference: Eastern League

Biographical details
- Born: October 25, 1975 (age 50); Duxbury, Massachusetts, U.S.

Playing career
- 1995–1999: St. Lawrence
- Positions: Pitcher, First baseman, Outfielder

Coaching career (HC unless noted)
- 1999–2002: St. Lawrence (asst.)
- 2002: St. Lawrence (Interim HC)
- 2003–2007: Northeastern (asst.)
- 2008–2019: Holy Cross
- 2020–2022: Lake County Captains
- 2023: Columbus Clippers (bench)
- 2024–present: Akron RubberDucks

Head coaching record
- Overall: 285–323–1
- Tournaments: Patriot: 20–20; NCAA: 1–2

Accomplishments and honors

Championships
- Patriot League Tournament (2017)

Awards
- 2× Patriot League Coach of the Year (2008, 2013); New England Division 1 Coach of the Year (2012)

Greg DiCenzo is a professional baseball coach and former football, soccer, and baseball player at St. Lawrence University. He is currently manager of the Akron RubberDucks, the Double-A affiliate of the Cleveland Guardians of Major League Baseball (MLB). He was previously the head baseball coach at the College of the Holy Cross from 2008 to 2019.

== Early life ==
DiCenzo attended Duxbury High School where he was a four-year starter on both the varsity soccer and varsity baseball teams, while a two-year member of the varsity basketball team. DiCenzo played for legendary coach Foster Cass.

Upon graduation, DiCenzo enrolled at St. Lawrence University, where he played for the football, men's soccer and baseball teams. In four seasons on the baseball team, he competed as a pitcher, a first-baseman, and an outfielder. Only playing soccer for one season, he played football for four seasons as both a punter and placekicker. He earned three degrees while at St. Lawrence: a Bachelor of Science degree, a master's degree in education, and a master's degree in education administration.

== Coaching career ==
Upon graduation, DiCenzo was named an assistant baseball coach at St. Lawrence. He coached baseball for four seasons at St. Lawrence and was an assistant with the football program for two seasons. After the 2002 baseball season with St. Lawrence, he became the pitching coach for the Northeastern Huskies baseball program, where he served from 2003 to 2007. On May 22, 2007, he resigned from his position at Northeastern. He also served as the pitching coach for the Falmouth Commodores from 2002 to 2005 in the Cape Cod Baseball League.

On July 2, 2007, DiCenzo was named the head coach of the Holy Cross Crusaders baseball team.

On January 23, 2020, DiCenzo was named the manager of the Lake County Captains of the Midwest League.

On October 9, 2021, DiCenzo was named the manager of the Scottsdale Scorpions, one of six clubs in Major League Baseball's Arizona Fall League.

DiCenzo was promoted to bench coach of the Guardians' Triple-A affiliate, the Columbus Clippers, on February 7, 2023. On January 24, 2024, DiCenzo was named manager of the Guardians' Double-A affiliate, the Akron RubberDucks.

== Head coaching record ==
Record table
Season	Team	Overall	Conference	Standing	Postseason
Holy Cross Crusaders (Patriot League) (2008–2019)
2008	Holy Cross	21–28	11–9	3rd	Patriot League tournament
2009	Holy Cross	22–27	11–7	3rd	Patriot League tournament
2010	Holy Cross	26–26	10–10	3rd	Patriot League tournament
2011	Holy Cross	24–23–1	9–11	5th	
2012	Holy Cross	33–22	13–7	2nd	Patriot League tournament
2013	Holy Cross	28–25	15–5	1st	Patriot League tournament
2014	Holy Cross	13–31	4–14	6th	
2015	Holy Cross	24–26	12–8	3rd	Patriot League tournament
2016	Holy Cross	30–27	14–6	2nd	Patriot League tournament
2017	Holy Cross	24–29	12–8	2nd	NCAA Regional
2018	Holy Cross	18–27	11–14	4th	Patriot League tournament
2019	Holy Cross	22–32	15–10	T-2nd	Patriot League tournament
Holy Cross:		285–323–1	137–109		
Total:		285–323–1			
National champion Postseason invitational champion Conference regular season champion Conference regular season and conference tournament champion Division regular season champion Division regular season and conference tournament champion Conference tournament champion
