= Sean Leary (baseball) =

Baseball coach and former shortstop

Current position
- Title: Head coach
- Team: Lehigh
- Conference: Patriot League
- Record: 636–789–8 (.447)

Playing career
- 1990–1993: Lehigh
- Position: Shortstop

Coaching career (HC unless noted)
- 1995: Lehigh (asst.)
- 1996: Lehigh (Interim HC)
- 1997–present: Lehigh

Head coaching record
- Overall: 636–789–8 (.447)
- Tournaments: NCAA: 0–4 (.000)

Accomplishments and honors

Championships
- 2× Patriot League (2002, 2006); 2× Patriot League Tournament (2006, 2015)

Awards
- 2× Patriot League Coach of the Year (2006, 2010)

Sean P. Leary is an American college baseball coach and former shortstop. He is the head baseball coach at Lehigh Mountain Hawks in Bethlehem, Pennsylvania. Leary played college baseball at Lehigh for coach Stan Schultz from 1990 to 1993.

== Playing career ==
Leary graduated from Bethlehem Catholic High School in Bethlehem, Pennsylvania. Leary enrolled at Lehigh University, to play college baseball for the Lehigh Engineers baseball team. Leary became a starter as a senior in 1993, hitting a .296 with 1 homer run and 15 RBIs.

== Coaching career ==
Leary was an assistant in 1995 for Lehigh under new head coach, Tom Morgan. With Morgan experiencing health issues during the 1996 season, which ultimately led to his death, Leary was named the interim head coach. After leading the Engineers to an 18–20–1 record in 1996, Leary was named the full-time head coach on December 12, 1996.

Leary lead the Mountain Hawks to a 28–28 record in 2006, tied for first place in the Patriot League. Leary was named the 2006 Patriot League Coach of the Year.

Leary engineered a 12-game turnaround from 2009 to 2010, leading to a second place Patriot League finish and being named the Patriot League Coach of the Year for the second time.

== Head coaching record ==
Record table
Season	Team	Overall	Conference	Standing	Postseason
Lehigh Engineers/Mountain Hawks (Patriot League) (1996–present)
1996	Lehigh	18–20–1	12–8	2nd	Patriot League tournament
1997	Lehigh	18–24–1	9–11	4th	
1998	Lehigh	13–26	7–13	5th	
1999	Lehigh	14–28	8–12	5th	
2000	Lehigh	21–22	8–12	4th	
2001	Lehigh	14–28	6–14	5th	
2002	Lehigh	29–21–1	13–7	T-1st	Patriot League tournament
2003	Lehigh	19–23	9–11	3rd	Patriot League tournament
2004	Lehigh	25–21	9–11	3rd	Patriot League tournament
2005	Lehigh	26–21–1	12–8	2nd	Patriot League tournament
2006	Lehigh	28–28	13–7	T-1st	NCAA Regional
2007	Lehigh	13–30–1	2–18	6th	
2008	Lehigh	23–27	7–13	6th	
2009	Lehigh	11–36–1	4–14	6th	
2010	Lehigh	23–27	12–8	2nd	Patriot League tournament
2011	Lehigh	24–21	8–12	6th	
2012	Lehigh	18–31–1	6–14	6th	
2013	Lehigh	18–29	5–15	6th	
2014	Lehigh	25–24	10–10	3rd	Patriot League tournament
2015	Lehigh	25–31	12–9	2nd	NCAA Regional
2016	Lehigh	25–29	9–10	3rd	Patriot League tournament
2017	Lehigh	21–29	8–12	5th	
2018	Lehigh	22–27	10–15	5th	
2019	Lehigh	21–28	9–16	5th	
2020	Lehigh	5–10	0–0		Season canceled due to COVID-19
2021	Lehigh	24–19	17–10	1st (South)	Patriot League tournament
2022	Lehigh	26–24	12–13	3rd	Patriot League tournament
2023	Lehigh	24–26	10–15	T-4th	
2024	Lehigh	24–23–1	9–16	5th	
2025	Lehigh	24–26	11–14	4th	Patriot League tournament
2026	Lehigh	15–31	8–18	5th	
Lehigh:		636–789–8 (.447)	275–366 (.429)		
Total:		636–789–8 (.447)			
National champion Postseason invitational champion Conference regular season champion Conference regular season and conference tournament champion Division regular season champion Division regular season and conference tournament champion Conference tournament champion

== See also ==
- List of current NCAA Division I baseball coaches
