= Scott Heather =

American college baseball coach (born 1975)

Current position
- Title: Head coach
- Team: Bucknell
- Conference: Patriot League
- Record: 268–355–2

Biographical details
- Born: September 14, 1975 (age 51); St. Paul, Minnesota, U.S.

Playing career
- 1995–1996: Arizona Western
- 1997–1998: Arkansas
- Position: Pitcher

Coaching career (HC unless noted)
- 1999: Arkansas (assistant)
- 2000–2004: Arkansas–Fort Smith (assistant)
- 2005–2012: Bucknell (assistant)
- 2013–present: Bucknell

Head coaching record
- Overall: 268–355–2
- Tournaments: NCAA: 1–2

Accomplishments and honors

Championships
- 2 Patriot League: 2014, 2026; Patriot League Tournament: 2014

Awards
- 2 Patriot League Coach of the Year: 2014, 2026

Scott Heather (born September 14, 1975) is an American college baseball coach, currently serving as head coach of the Bucknell Bison baseball program. He was named to that position prior to the 2013 season.

Heather began his playing career at Arizona Western, and completed his eligibility at Arkansas. He played on season with the independent Duluth–Superior Dukes and served as a student assistant at Arkansas in 1999. For the next five seasons, he worked as an assistant coach at Arkansas–Fort Smith, then a junior college. In 2005, Heather joined the staff at Bucknell, working with pitchers. He was elevated to the head coaching position after longtime head coach Gene Depew retired. After claiming a share of the conference regular season title and the top seed in the 2014 Patriot League baseball tournament, Heather was named Patriot League Coach of the Year in 2014.

== Head coaching record ==
The following table shows Heather's record as a head coach.

Record table
Season	Team	Overall	Conference	Standing	Postseason
Bucknell Bison (Patriot League) (2013–present)
2013	Bucknell	16–33	10–10	4th	Patriot League tournament (Note: The top four finishers of the Patriot League's six teams qualified for the tournament in 2013.)
2014	Bucknell	31–21	15–5	T-1st	NCAA Regional
2015	Bucknell	24–22	8–12	5th	
2016	Bucknell	18–34	8–12	4th	Patriot League tournament
2017	Bucknell	21–28	10–10	T-3rd	Patriot League tournament
2018	Bucknell	17–27–1	13–10–1	3rd	Patriot League tournament
2019	Bucknell	14–33	6–19	6th	
2020	Bucknell	4–12	0–0		Season canceled due to COVID-19
2021	Bucknell	11–22	11–15	3rd (South)	
2022	Bucknell	22–25	14–11	2nd	Patriot League tournament
2023	Bucknell	23–23–1	14–11	T-2nd	Patriot League tournament
2024	Bucknell	22–24	12–13	4th	Patriot League tournament
2025	Bucknell	18–27	10–15	5th	
2026	Bucknell	27–24	17–9	T–1st	Patriot League tournament
Bucknell:		268–355–2	148–142–1		
Total:		268–355–2			
National champion Postseason invitational champion Conference regular season champion Conference regular season and conference tournament champion Division regular season champion Division regular season and conference tournament champion Conference tournament champion

== See also ==
- List of current NCAA Division I baseball coaches
