= 1994 Patriot League baseball tournament =

- Teams: 2
- Format: Best of three series
- Finals site: Max Bishop Stadium; Annapolis, MD
- Champions: Navy (1st title)
- Winning coach: Bob MacDonald (1st title)
- MVP: Steve Mauro (Navy)

1994 Patriot League baseball standings
	Conf.						Overall
Team	W		L		T	PCT	W		L		T	PCT
North
Army ^{x}‍‍‍	17	–	3	–	0	.850	25	–	17	–	0	.595
Fordham ^{x}‍‍‍	17	–	3	–	0	.850	28	–	19	–	0	.596
Holy Cross ‍‍‍	11	–	9	–	0	.550	14	–	18	–	0	.438
Colgate ‍‍‍	1	–	17	–	0	.056	1	–	28	–	0	.034
South
Navy ^{x}‍‍‡‍	11	–	9	–	0	.550	24	–	18	–	1	.570
Lafayette ‍‍‍	8	–	12	–	0	.400	11	–	25	–	0	.306
Lehigh ‍‍‍	8	–	12	–	0	.400	11	–	17	–	0	.393
Bucknell ‍‍‍	5	–	13	–	0	.278	10	–	25	–	0	.286
x – Division champion ‡ – Tournament champion As of June 30, 1994; Rankings from Collegiate Baseball

The 1994 Patriot League baseball tournament was held on May 8, 1994 to determine the champion of the Patriot League for baseball for the 1994 NCAA Division I baseball season. The event matched Army and Navy, respectively the winners of the North Division and the winners of the South Division at Max Bishop Stadium, home field of the Navy Midshipmen in a best of three series. South Division Champion Navy won their first championship and advanced to a play-in round ahead of the 1994 NCAA Division I baseball tournament, where they were defeated by Wright State. Steve Mauro of Navy was named Tournament Most Valuable Player.

== Results ==
Finals
Army	4	6	—
Navy	8	7	—

Game One

Team	R	H	E
Army	4	4	2
Navy	8	11	0

Game Two

Team	R	H	E
Navy	7	8	4
Army	6	5	0
