= 1997 Patriot League baseball tournament =

- Teams: 3
- Format: Best of three series
- Finals site: Johnson Stadium at Doubleday Field; West Point, New York
- Champions: Army (1st title)
- Winning coach: Danny Roberts (1st title)
- MVP: Bryan Price (Army)

1997 Patriot League baseball standings
	Conf.						Overall
Team	W		L		T	PCT	W		L		T	PCT
Army ‍†‍‡‍	15	–	5	–	0	.750	26	–	20	–	1	.564
Navy ‍‍‍	12	–	6	–	0	.667	19	–	27	–	0	.413
Bucknell ‍‍‍	10	–	10	–	0	.500	25	–	24	–	1	.510
Lehigh ‍‍‍	9	–	11	–	0	.450	18	–	24	–	1	.430
Lafayette ‍‍‍	7	–	12	–	0	.368	11	–	26	–	0	.297
Holy Cross ‍‍‍	5	–	14	–	0	.263	11	–	25	–	0	.306
‡ – Tournament champion As of June 30, 1997; Rankings from Collegiate Baseball

The 1997 Patriot League baseball tournament was held on May 4 and 5, 1997 to determine the champion of the Patriot League for baseball for the 1997 NCAA Division I baseball season. The event matched the top three finishers of the six-team league in a double-elimination tournament. Regular season champion Army won their first championship and advanced to a play-in round ahead of the 1997 NCAA Division I baseball tournament, where they lost to Harvard in three games. Bryan Price of the Army was named Tournament Most Valuable Player.

== Format and seeding ==
The top three finishers by conference winning percentage from the league's regular season advanced to the tournament. The top seed earned a first-round bye and the right to host the event. The second and third seeds played an elimination game, with the winner meeting the top seed in a best-of-three series.

Team	W	L	Pct	GB	Seed
Army	15	5	.750	—	1
Navy	12	6	.667	2	2
Bucknell	10	10	.500	5	3
Lehigh	9	11	.450	6	—
Lafayette	7	12	.368	7.5	—
Holy Cross	5	14	.263	9	—

== Results ==
Semifinal			Final
			1	Army	16	5	11
2	Navy	4	3	Bucknell	14	6	10
3	Bucknell	9
