= 1999 Patriot League baseball tournament =

- Teams: 3
- Format: Best of three series
- Finals site: Bucknell Field; Lewisburg, Pennsylvania
- Champions: Navy (3rd title)
- Winning coach: Bob MacDonald (3rd title)
- MVP: Pat Klakow (Navy)

1999 Patriot League baseball standings
	Conf.						Overall
Team	W		L		T	PCT	W		L		T	PCT
Bucknell ‍†‍‍	15	–	5	–	0	.750	25	–	28	–	0	.472
Navy ‍†‍‡‍^{y}	15	–	5	–	0	.750	27	–	22	–	1	.550
Holy Cross ‍‍‍	9	–	11	–	0	.450	14	–	26	–	0	.350
Army ‍‍‍	9	–	11	–	0	.450	15	–	28	–	0	.349
Lehigh ‍‍‍	8	–	12	–	0	.400	14	–	28	–	0	.333
Lafayette ‍‍‍	4	–	16	–	0	.200	8	–	31	–	0	.205
‡ – Tournament champion y – Invited to the NCAA tournament As of June 30, 1999; Rankings from Collegiate Baseball

The 1999 Patriot League baseball tournament was held on May 17 and 18, 1999 to determine the champion of the Patriot League for baseball for the 1999 NCAA Division I baseball season. The event matched the top three finishers of the six-team league in a double-elimination tournament. Second seeded Navy won their third championship and claimed the Patriot's automatic bid to the 1999 NCAA Division I baseball tournament. Pat Klakow of Navy was named Tournament Most Valuable Player.

== Format and seeding ==
The top three finishers by conference winning percentage from the league's regular season advanced to the tournament. The top seed earned a first round by and the right to host the event. The second and third seeds played an elimination game, with the winner meeting the top seed in a best-of-three series.

Team	W	L	Pct	GB	Seed
Bucknell	15	5	.750	—	1
Navy	15	5	.750	—	2
Holy Cross	9	11	.450	6	3
Army	9	11	.450	6	—
Lehigh	8	12	.400	7	—
Lafayette	4	16	.200	11	—

== Results ==
Semifinal			Final
			1	Bucknell	7	7	9
2	Navy	8	2	Navy	10	4	13
3	Holy Cross	4
