= 2000 Patriot League baseball tournament =

- Teams: 3
- Format: Best of three series
- Finals site: Max Bishop Stadium; Annapolis, Maryland
- Champions: Army (2nd title)
- Winning coach: Danny Roberts (2nd title)
- MVP: Josh Minney (Army)

2000 Patriot League baseball standings
	Conf.						Overall
Team	W		L		T	PCT	W		L		T	PCT
Navy ‍†‍‍	14	–	6	–	0	.700	24	–	20	–	1	.544
Bucknell ‍‍‍	12	–	8	–	0	.600	22	–	25	–	0	.468
Army ‍‍‡‍^{y}	10	–	8	–	0	.556	24	–	20	–	1	.544
Lehigh ‍‍‍	8	–	12	–	0	.400	21	–	22	–	0	.488
Holy Cross ‍‍‍	8	–	12	–	0	.400	13	–	27	–	1	.329
Lafayette ‍‍‍	6	–	12	–	0	.333	12	–	27	–	0	.308
‡ – Tournament champion y – Invited to the NCAA tournament As of June 30, 2000; Rankings from Collegiate Baseball

The 2000 Patriot League baseball tournament was held on May 13 and 14, 2000 to determine the champion of the Patriot League for baseball for the 2000 NCAA Division I baseball season. The event matched the top three finishers of the six team league in a double-elimination tournament. Third seeded Army won their second championship and claimed the Patriot's automatic bid to the 2000 NCAA Division I baseball tournament. Josh Minney of Army was named Tournament Most Valuable Player.

== Format and seeding ==
The top three finishers by conference winning percentage from the league's regular season advanced to the tournament. The top seed earned a first round by and the right to host the event. The second and third seeds played an elimination game, with the winner meeting the top seed in a best-of-three series.

Team	W	L	Pct	GB	Seed
Navy	14	6	.700	—	1
Bucknell	12	8	.600	2	2
Army	10	8	.556	3	3
Lehigh	8	12	.400	6	—
Holy Cross	8	12	.400	6	—
Lafayette	6	16	.333	9	—

== Results ==
Semifinal			Final
			1	Navy	4	7^{10}	—
2	Bucknell	4	3	Army	13	8	—
3	Army	5
