= 1993 Patriot League baseball tournament =

- Teams: 2
- Format: Best of three series
- Finals site: Houlihan Park; Bronx, NY
- Champions: Fordham (1st title)
- Winning coach: Dan Gallagher (1st title)
- MVP: Joe Schultz (Fordham)

1993 Patriot League baseball standings
	Conf.				Overall
Team	W		L	PCT	W		L	PCT
North
Fordham ^{x}‍‍‡‍^{y}	13	–	7	.650	32	–	27	.542
Army ‍‍‍	11	–	9	.550	17	–	22	.436
Holy Cross ‍‍‍	9	–	11	.450	12	–	20	.375
Colgate ‍‍‍	6	–	14	.300	8	–	20	.286
South
Navy ^{x}‍‍‍	11	–	9	.550	20	–	16	.556
Lehigh ‍‍‍	10	–	10	.500	15	–	19	.441
Bucknell ‍‍‍	10	–	10	.500	15	–	25	.375
Lafayette ‍‍‍	10	–	10	.500	12	–	21	.364
x – Division champion ‡ – Tournament champion y – Invited to the NCAA tournament As of June 30, 1993; Rankings from Collegiate Baseball

The 1993 Patriot League baseball tournament was held on May 8 and 9, 1993 to determine the champion of the Patriot League for baseball for the 1993 NCAA Division I baseball season. The event matched Fordham and Navy, respectively the winners of the North Division and the winners of the South Division at Houlihan Park, home field of the Fordham Rams in a best of three series. This was the first postseason Patriot League baseball championship. North Division Champion Fordham won the first championship. Joe Shultz of Fordham was named Tournament Most Valuable Player.

Both participants also played in the Eastern College Athletic Conference baseball tournament, which offered an automatic bid to the 1993 NCAA Division I baseball tournament. Fordham would also win the 1993 ECAC baseball tournament, held in Waterbury, Connecticut.

== Results ==
Finals
Fordham	1	8	6
Navy	11	5	2
