= 1998 Patriot League baseball tournament =

- Teams: 3
- Format: Best of three series
- Finals site: Max Bishop Stadium; Annapolis, Maryland
- Champions: Navy (2nd title)
- Winning coach: Bob MacDonald (2nd title)
- MVP: Luke Braham (Navy)

1998 Patriot League baseball standings
| | Conf. | | | | Overall |
| Team | W | | L | PCT | W | | L | PCT |
|---|---|---|---|---|---|---|---|---|
| Navy ‍†‍‡‍ | 15 | – | 5 | .750 | 26 | – | 17 | .605 |
| Bucknell ‍‍‍ | 13 | – | 7 | .650 | 31 | – | 17 | .646 |
| Army ‍‍‍ | 12 | – | 8 | .600 | 26 | – | 29 | .473 |
| Lafayette ‍‍‍ | 8 | – | 12 | .400 | 10 | – | 26 | .278 |
| Lehigh ‍‍‍ | 7 | – | 13 | .350 | 13 | – | 26 | .333 |
| Holy Cross ‍‍‍ | 5 | – | 15 | .250 | 7 | – | 29 | .194 |
‡ – Tournament champion As of June 30, 1998; Rankings from Collegiate Baseball

The 1998 Patriot League baseball tournament was held on May 2 and 3, 1998 to determine the champion of the Patriot League for baseball for the 1998 NCAA Division I baseball season. The event matched the top three finishers of the six team league in a double-elimination tournament. Regular season champion Navy won their second championship and advanced to a play-in round ahead of the 1998 NCAA Division I baseball tournament, where they lost to Monmouth in three games. Luke Braham of Navy was named Tournament Most Valuable Player.

== Format and seeding ==
The top three finishers by conference winning percentage from the league's regular season advanced to the tournament. The top seed earned a first round by and the right to host the event. The second and third seeds played an elimination game, with the winner meeting the top seed in a best-of-three series.

| Team | W | L | Pct | GB | Seed |
|---|---|---|---|---|---|
| Navy | 15 | 5 | .750 | — | 1 |
| Bucknell | 13 | 7 | .650 | 2 | 2 |
| Army | 12 | 8 | .600 | 3 | 3 |
| Lafayette | 8 | 12 | .400 | 7 | — |
| Lehigh | 7 | 13 | .350 | 8 | — |
| Holy Cross | 5 | 15 | .250 | 10 | — |

== Results ==
| Semifinal | | | Final |
| | | | 1 | Navy | 11 | 8 | — |
| 2 | Bucknell | 9 | 2 | Bucknell | 3 | 6 | — |
| 3 | Army | 1 |
