= 2001 Patriot League baseball tournament =

- Teams: 3
- Format: Best of three series
- Finals site: Max Bishop Stadium; Annapolis, Maryland
- Champions: Bucknell (2nd title)
- Winning coach: Gene Depew (2nd title)
- MVP: Brad Gething (Bucknell)

2001 Patriot League baseball standings
	Conf.						Overall
Team	W		L		T	PCT	W		L		T	PCT
Navy ‍†‍‍	14	–	6	–	0	.700	21	–	25	–	1	.457
Bucknell ‍†‍‡‍^{y}	14	–	6	–	0	.700	31	–	19	–	0	.620
Holy Cross ‍‍‍	11	–	9	–	0	.550	19	–	23	–	0	.452
Army ‍‍‍	10	–	10	–	0	.500	17	–	27	–	1	.389
Lehigh ‍‍‍	6	–	14	–	0	.300	14	–	28	–	0	.333
Lafayette ‍‍‍	5	–	15	–	0	.250	10	–	32	–	0	.238
‡ – Tournament champion y – Invited to the NCAA tournament As of June 30, 2001; Rankings from Collegiate Baseball

The 2001 Patriot League baseball tournament was held on May 12 and 13, 2001 to determine the champion of the Patriot League for baseball for the 2001 NCAA Division I baseball season. The event matched the top three finishers of the six team league in a double-elimination tournament. Second seeded Bucknell won their second championship and claimed the Patriot's automatic bid to the 2001 NCAA Division I baseball tournament. Brad Gething of Bucknell was named Tournament Most Valuable Player.

== Format and seeding ==
The top three finishers by conference winning percentage from the league's regular season advanced to the tournament. The top seed earned a first round by and the right to host the event. The second and third seeds played an elimination game, with the winner meeting the top seed in a best-of-three series.

Team	W	L	Pct	GB	Seed
Navy	14	6	.700	—	1
Bucknell	14	6	.700	—	2
Holy Cross	11	9	.550	3	3
Army	10	10	.500	4	—
Lehigh	6	14	.300	8	—
Lafayette	5	15	.250	9	—

== Results ==
Semifinal			Final
			1	Navy	4	2	–
2	Bucknell	10	2	Bucknell	6	6	–
3	Holy Cross	4
