= 2014 Patriot League baseball tournament =

- Teams: 4
- Format: Best of three series
- Finals site: Eugene B. Depew Field; Lewisburg, PA
- Champions: Bucknell (6th title)
- Winning coach: Scott Heather (1st title)
- MVP: Joe Ogren (Bucknell)

2014 Patriot League baseball standings
	Conf.						Overall
Team	W		L		T	PCT	W		L		T	PCT
Bucknell ‍†‍‡‍^{y}	15	–	5	–	0	.750	31	–	21	–	1	.594
Army ‍†‍‍	15	–	5	–	0	.750	33	–	18	–	0	.647
Lehigh ‍‍‍	10	–	10	–	0	.500	25	–	24	–	0	.510
Navy ‍‍‍	9	–	11	–	0	.450	23	–	28	–	0	.451
Lafayette ‍‍‍	5	–	13	–	0	.278	15	–	26	–	0	.366
Holy Cross ‍‍‍	4	–	14	–	0	.222	13	–	31	–	0	.295
† – Conference champion ‡ – Tournament champion y – Invited to the NCAA tournament Rankings from Collegiate Baseball

The 2014 Patriot League baseball tournament took place on consecutive weekends, with the semifinals held May 10–11 and the finals May 17–18. The higher seeded teams each hosted best of three series. Bucknell won their sixth Tournament championship and earned the conference's automatic bid to the 2014 NCAA Division I baseball tournament.

== Seeding ==
The top four finishers from the regular season were seeded one through four, with the top seed hosting the fourth seed and second seed hosting the third. The visiting team was designated as the home team in the second game of each series. Top seeded Bucknell hosted fourth seeded Navy, while second seeded Army hosted third seeded Lehigh in the opening round. Bucknell claimed the top seed by tiebreaker over Army.

Team	Wins	Losses	Pct.	GB	Seed
Bucknell	15	5	.750	–	1
Army	15	5	.750	–	2
Lehigh	10	10	.500	5	3
Navy	9	11	.450	6	4
Lafayette	5	13	.278	9	–
Holy Cross	4	14	..222	10	–

== Results ==
Semifinals
1	Bucknell	15	8	—
4	Navy	6	4	—
2	Army	0	3	1
3	Lehigh	6	2	3

Finals
1	Bucknell	5	7	—
3	Lehigh	4	2	—

=== Semifinals ===
==== Bucknell vs. Navy ====
May 10, 2014 12:00 pm at Eugene B. Depew Field, Lewisburg, Pennsylvania
Team	1	2	3	4	5	6	7	8	9	R	H	E
4 Navy	0	0	0	1	2	0	0	0	3	6	10	0
1 Bucknell	0	0	2	1	3	4	0	5	X	15	16	0
WP: Hough (7–3) LP: Parenti (8–3); Notes: Game 1 Boxscore

May 10, 2014 4:00 pm at Eugene B. Depew Field, Lewisburg, Pennsylvania
Team	1	2	3	4	5	6	7	8	9	R	H	E
1 Bucknell	0	0	0	1	5	0	0	2	0	8	10	0
4 Navy	0	0	0	0	0	3	0	1	X	4	16	1
WP: Weigel (6–4) LP: Gillingham (2–6); Attendance: 450; Notes: Game 2 Boxscore

==== Army vs. Lehigh ====
May 10, 2014 12:00 pm at Johnson Stadium at Doubleday Field, West Point, New York
Team	1	2	3	4	5	6	7	8	9	R	H	E
3 Lehigh	0	0	1	0	0	0	1	0	4	6	9	2
2 Army	0	0	0	0	0	0	0	0	0	0	5	3
WP: Gozton (5–1) LP: Dignacco (6–3); Attendance: 237; Notes: Game 1 Boxscore

May 10, 2014 4:00 pm at Johnson Stadium at Doubleday Field, West Point, New York
Team	1	2	3	4	5	6	7	8	9	R	H	E
2 Army	0	0	0	0	0	1	0	2	0	3	5	1
3 Lehigh	1	0	0	0	0	0	0	0	1	2	5	3
WP: Robinett (6–3) LP: Long (4–4); Home runs: Army: None; Lehigh: Brong; Attendance: 237; Notes: Game 2 Boxscore

May 11, 2014 12:00 pm at Johnson Stadium at Doubleday Field, West Point, New York
Team	1	2	3	4	5	6	7	8	9	R	H	E
3 Lehigh	0	1	0	1	1	0	0	0	0	3	12	3
2 Army	0	1	0	0	0	0	0	0	0	1	5	2
WP: Cassell (5–3) LP: Carroll (8–4) Sv: McNamara (3); Attendance: 347; Notes: Game 3, if necessary Boxscore

=== Final ===
May 17, 2014 12:07 pm at Eugene B. Depew Field, Lewisburg, Pennsylvania
Team	1	2	3	4	5	6	7	8	9	R	H	E
3 Lehigh	2	0	0	0	0	0	0	0	2	4	5	0
1 Bucknell	0	2	0	0	0	0	0	3	X	5	11	1
WP: Hough (8–3) LP: Long (4–5) Sv: Hammond (3); Attendance: 178; Notes: Game 1 Boxscore

May 17, 2014 3:11 pm at Eugene B. Depew Field, Lewisburg, Pennsylvania
Team	1	2	3	4	5	6	7	8	9	R	H	E
1 Bucknell	0	0	0	5	0	1	1	0	0	7	9	1
3 Lehigh	0	0	0	0	0	0	2	0	0	2	6	2
WP: Weigel (7–4) LP: Burke (3–4); Attendance: 375; Notes: Game 2 Boxscore

== All-Tournament Team ==
The following players were named to the All-Tournament Team.

Name	School
Tyler Brong	Lehigh
Nick Cassell	Lehigh
Robert Currie	Navy
Xavier Hammond	Bucknell
Bryson Hough	Bucknell
Kash Manzelli	Navy
Justin Meier	Bucknell
Joe Ogren	Bucknell
Justin Pacchioli	Lehigh
Jacob Page	Army
Alex Robinett	Army

=== Most Valuable Player ===
Joe Ogren was named Tournament Most Valuable Player. Ogren was an outfielder for Bucknell.
