= 2011 Patriot League baseball tournament =

- Teams: 4
- Format: Best of three series
- Finals site: Max Bishop Stadium; Annapolis, Maryland
- Champions: Navy (5th title)
- Winning coach: Paul Kostacopoulos (1st title)
- MVP: Ben Nelson (Navy)

2011 Patriot League baseball standings
	Conf.						Overall
Team	W		L		T	PCT	W		L		T	PCT
Navy ‍†‍‡‍^{y}	12	–	8	–	0	.600	33	–	25	–	1	.568
Army ‍‍‍	11	–	9	–	0	.550	22	–	26	–	0	.458
Lafayette ‍‍‍	10	–	10	–	0	.500	18	–	30	–	0	.375
Bucknell ‍‍‍	10	–	10	–	0	.500	25	–	28	–	0	.472
Holy Cross ‍‍‍	9	–	11	–	0	.450	24	–	23	–	1	.510
Lehigh ‍‍‍	8	–	12	–	0	.400	24	–	21	–	0	.533
‡ – Tournament champion y – Invited to the NCAA tournament As of June 30, 2011; Rankings from Collegiate Baseball

The 2011 Patriot League baseball tournament was held on consecutive weekends with the semifinals held May 14–15 and the finals May 23–24, 2011 to determine the champion of the Patriot League for baseball for the 2011 NCAA Division I baseball season. The event matched the top four finishers of the six team league in a double-elimination tournament. Top seeded Navy won their fifth championship and claimed the Patriot's automatic bid to the 2011 NCAA Division I baseball tournament. Ben Nelson of Navy was named Tournament Most Valuable Player.

== Format and seeding ==
The top four finishers from the regular season were seeded one through four, with the top seed hosting the fourth seed and second seed hosting the third. The visiting team was designated as the home team in the second game of each series. Bucknell hosted Lafayette while Holy Cross visited Army.

Team	W	L	Pct	GB	Seed
Navy	12	8	.600	—	1
Army	11	9	.550	1	2
Lafayette	10	10	.500	2	3
Bucknell	10	10	.500	2	4
Holy Cross	9	11	.450	3	—
Lehigh	8	12	.450	4	—

== Results ==
Semifinals
1	Navy	0	6	6
4	Bucknell	1^{16}	1	0
2	Army	4	7	—
3	Lafayette	2	3	—

Finals
1	Navy	4	3	5
2	Army	3	6	3

== All-Tournament Team ==
Name	School
Alex Azor	Navy
Alex Cillo	Bucknell
Nick Driscoll	Navy
Ryan Ebner	Bucknell
Bobby Fargnoli	Lafayette
Zach Fritz	Lafayette
Preston Gainey	Navy
Joey Henshaw	Army
Ben Koenigsfeld	Army
Clint Moore	Army
Ben Nelson	Navy
