= 2008 Patriot League baseball tournament =

- Teams: 4
- Format: Best of three series
- Finals site: Max Bishop Stadium; Annapolis, Maryland
- Champions: Bucknell (4th title)
- Winning coach: Gene Depew (4th title)
- MVP: Jason Buursma (Bucknell)

2008 Patriot League baseball standings
	Conf.						Overall
Team	W		L		T	PCT	W		L		T	PCT
Army ‍†‍‍	13	–	7	–	0	.650	25	–	25	–	0	.500
Navy ‍‍‍	11	–	9	–	0	.550	32	–	25	–	1	.560
Holy Cross ‍‍‍	11	–	9	–	0	.550	21	–	28	–	0	.429
Bucknell ‍‍‡‍^{y}	10	–	10	–	0	.500	30	–	24	–	2	.554
Lafayette ‍‍‍	8	–	12	–	0	.400	25	–	23	–	0	.521
Lehigh ‍‍‍	7	–	13	–	0	.350	23	–	27	–	0	.460
‡ – Tournament champion y – Invited to the NCAA tournament As of June 30, 2008; Rankings from Collegiate Baseball

The 2008 Patriot League baseball tournament was held on consecutive weekends with the semifinals held May 10–11 and the finals May 16–17, 2008 to determine the champion of the Patriot League for baseball for the 2008 NCAA Division I baseball season. The event matched the top four finishers of the six team league in a double-elimination tournament. Fourth seeded Bucknell won their fourth championship and claimed the Patriot's automatic bid to the 2008 NCAA Division I baseball tournament. Jason Buursma of Bucknell was named Tournament Most Valuable Player.

== Format and seeding ==
The top four finishers from the regular season were seeded one through four, with the top seed hosting the fourth seed and second seed hosting the third. The visiting team was designated as the home team in the second game of each series. Army hosted Bucknell while Holy Cross visited Navy.

Team	W	L	Pct	GB	Seed
Army	13	7	.650	—	1
Navy	11	9	.550	2	2
Holy Cross	11	9	.550	2	3
Bucknell	10	10	.500	3	4
Lafayette	8	12	.400	5	—
Lehigh	7	13	.350	6	—

== Results ==
Semifinals
1	Army	4	12	0
4	Bucknell	5^{10}	3	1
2	Navy	0	12	9
3	Holy Cross	6	1	5

Finals
4	Bucknell	7	8	—
2	Navy	6	7	—

== All-Tournament Team ==
Name	School
Ben Allen	Bucknell
Kendall Bolt	Navy
Jason Buursma	Bucknell
Oliver Drake	Navy
Gil Gomez	Holy Cross
Thomas Hamilton	Navy
Shawn Hirsch	Bucknell
Bobby Holmes	Holy Cross
Ed Rubbo	Bucknell
Chris Simmons	Army
Cole White	Army
