= 2005 Patriot League baseball tournament =

- Teams: 3
- Format: Best of three series
- Finals site: Johnson Stadium at Doubleday Field; West Point, New York
- Champions: Army (4th title)
- Winning coach: Joe Sottolano (3rd title)
- MVP: Walker Gorham (Army)

2005 Patriot League baseball standings
	Conf.						Overall
Team	W		L		T	PCT	W		L		T	PCT
Army ‍†‍‡‍^{y}	17	–	3	–	0	.850	39	–	14	–	0	.736
Lehigh ‍‍‍	12	–	8	–	0	.600	26	–	21	–	1	.552
Bucknell ‍‍‍	10	–	10	–	0	.500	16	–	26	–	0	.381
Lafayette ‍‍‍	6	–	10	–	0	.375	18	–	26	–	0	.409
Holy Cross ‍‍‍	5	–	11	–	0	.313	13	–	23	–	0	.361
Navy ‍‍‍	6	–	14	–	0	.300	12	–	33	–	1	.272
‡ – Tournament champion y – Invited to the NCAA tournament As of June 30, 2005; Rankings from Collegiate Baseball

The 2005 Patriot League baseball tournament was held on May 14 and 15, 2005 to determine the champion of the Patriot League for baseball for the 2005 NCAA Division I baseball season. The event matched the top three finishers of the six team league in a double-elimination tournament. Top seeded Army won their fourth championship and claimed the Patriot's automatic bid to the 2005 NCAA Division I baseball tournament. Walker Gorham of Army was named Tournament Most Valuable Player.

== Format and seeding ==
The top three finishers by conference winning percentage from the league's regular season advanced to the tournament. The top seed earned a first round by and the right to host the event. The second and third seeds played an elimination game, with the winner meeting the top seed in a best-of-three series.

Team	W	L	Pct	GB	Seed
Army	17	3	.850	—	1
Lehigh	12	8	.600	5	2
Bucknell	10	10	.500	7	3
Lafayette	6	10	.375	9	—
Holy Cross	5	11	.313	10	—
Navy	6	14	.300	11	—

== Results ==
Semifinal			Final
			1	Army	6	10	—
2	Lehigh	5	2	Lehigh	2	1	—
3	Bucknell	2
