= 2003 Patriot League baseball tournament =

- Teams: 3
- Format: Best of three series
- Finals site: Eugene B. Depew Field; Lewisburg, Pennsylvania
- Champions: Bucknell (3rd title)
- Winning coach: Gene Depew (3rd title)
- MVP: Brian Day (Bucknell)

2003 Patriot League baseball standings
| | Conf. | | | | | | Overall |
| Team | W | | L | | T | PCT | W | | L | | T | PCT |
|---|---|---|---|---|---|---|---|---|---|---|---|---|
| Bucknell ‍†‍‡‍^{y} | 15 | – | 5 | – | 0 | .750 | 27 | – | 16 | – | 0 | .628 |
| Navy ‍‍‍ | 12 | – | 8 | – | 0 | .600 | 21 | – | 24 | – | 0 | .467 |
| Lehigh ‍‍‍ | 9 | – | 11 | – | 0 | .450 | 21 | – | 24 | – | 0 | .467 |
| Army ‍‍‍ | 9 | – | 11 | – | 0 | .450 | 17 | – | 25 | – | 1 | .407 |
| Holy Cross ‍‍‍ | 8 | – | 12 | – | 0 | .400 | 13 | – | 23 | – | 0 | .361 |
| Lafayette ‍‍‍ | 7 | – | 13 | – | 0 | .350 | 16 | – | 24 | – | 0 | .400 |
‡ – Tournament champion y – Invited to the NCAA tournament As of June 30, 2003; Rankings from Collegiate Baseball

The 2003 Patriot League baseball tournament was held on May 10 and 11, 2003 to determine the champion of the Patriot League for baseball for the 2003 NCAA Division I baseball season. The event matched the top three finishers of the six team league in a double-elimination tournament. Top seeded Bucknell won their third championship and claimed the Patriot's automatic bid to the 2003 NCAA Division I baseball tournament. Brian Day of Bucknell was named Tournament Most Valuable Player.

== Format and seeding ==
The top three finishers by conference winning percentage from the league's regular season advanced to the tournament. The top seed earned a first round by and the right to host the event. The second and third seeds played an elimination game, with the winner meeting the top seed in a best-of-three series.

| Team | W | L | Pct | GB | Seed |
|---|---|---|---|---|---|
| Bucknell | 15 | 5 | .750 | — | 1 |
| Navy | 12 | 8 | .600 | 3 | 2 |
| Lehigh | 9 | 11 | .450 | 6 | 3 |
| Army | 9 | 11 | .450 | 6 | — |
| Holy Cross | 8 | 12 | .400 | 7 | — |
| Lafayette | 7 | 13 | .350 | 8 | — |

== Results ==
| Semifinal | | | Final |
| | | | 1 | Bucknell | 3 | 10 | 20 |
| 2 | Navy | 6 | 2 | Navy | 16 | 4 | 9 |
| 3 | Lehigh | 3 |
