= 2017 Patriot League baseball tournament =

- Teams: 4
- Format: Best of three series
- Finals site: Fitton Field; Worcester, Massachusetts
- Champions: Holy Cross (1st title)
- Winning coach: Greg DiCenzo (1st title)
- MVP: Brendan King (Holy Cross)

2017 Patriot League baseball standings
	Conf.				Overall
Team	W		L	PCT	W		L	PCT
Navy ‍†‍‍	16	–	4	.800	37	–	17	.685
Holy Cross ‍‍‡‍	12	–	8	.600	24	–	29	.453
Army ‍‍‍	10	–	10	.500	25	–	31	.446
Bucknell ‍‍‍	10	–	10	.500	21	–	28	.429
Lehigh ‍‍‍	8	–	12	.400	21	–	29	.420
Lafayette ‍‍‍	4	–	16	.200	8	–	44	.154
† – Conference champion ‡ – Tournament champion As of June 30, 2017; Rankings from Collegiate Baseball

The 2017 Patriot League baseball tournament took place on consecutive weekends, with the semifinals held May 13–14 and the finals May 19–21. The higher seeded teams hosted each best of three series. Holy Cross won their first tournament championship and earned the conference's automatic bid to the 2017 NCAA Division I baseball tournament.

== Seeding ==
The top four finishers from the regular season are seeded one through four, with the top seed hosting the fourth seed and second seed hosting the third. The visiting team will be designated as the home team in the second game of each series.

== Results ==
Semifinals
1	Navy	1	0	—
4	Bucknell	4	5	—
2	Holy Cross	8	5	—
3	Army	2	4	—

Finals
4	Bucknell	3	7	—
2	Holy Cross	4	11	—

== All-Tournament team ==
The following players were named to the All-Tournament Team.

POS	Name	Class	School
P	Mike Castellani	Sr.	Bucknell
P	Kyle Condry	Sr.	Navy
P	Tyler Giovinco	So.	Army
P	Noah Song	So.	Navy
C	Jon Rosoff	Jr.	Army
1B	Anthony Critelli	Sr.	Holy Cross
1B	Danny Rafferty	Sr.	Bucknell
3B	Sam Clark	Sr.	Bucknell
OF	Josh Hassell	Sr.	Holy Cross
OF	Bill Schlich	Sr.	Holy Cross

=== Most Outstanding Player ===
Brendan King was named Tournament Most Outstanding Player. King was a senior pitcher for Holy Cross who won two games in the tournament with 14.1 IP and a 1.88 ERA.
