= 2015 Patriot League baseball tournament =

- Teams: 4
- Format: Best of three series
- Finals site: Max Bishop Stadium; Annapolis, Maryland
- Champions: Lehigh (2nd title)
- Winning coach: Sean Leary (2nd title)
- MVP: Mike Garzillo (Lehigh)

2015 Patriot League baseball standings
	Conf.						Overall
Team	W		L		T	PCT	W		L		T	PCT
Navy ‍†‍‍	13	–	7	–	0	.650	36	–	18	–	0	.667
Lehigh ‍‍‍	12	–	8	–	0	.600	23	–	26	–	0	.469
Holy Cross ‍‍‍	12	–	8	–	0	.600	24	–	26	–	0	.480
Lafayette ‍‍‍	9	–	11	–	0	.450	14	–	27	–	1	.345
Bucknell ‍‍‍	8	–	12	–	0	.400	24	–	22	–	0	.522
Army ‍‍‍	6	–	14	–	0	.300	21	–	26	–	0	.447
† – Conference champion ‡ – Tournament champion As of May 10, 2015; Rankings from Collegiate Baseball

The 2015 Patriot League baseball tournament took place on consecutive weekends, with the semifinals held May 9–10 and the finals May 16–17. The higher seeded teams hosted each best of three series. Lehigh won their second tournament championship to earn the conference's automatic bid to the 2015 NCAA Division I baseball tournament.

== Seeding ==
The top four finishers from the regular season are seeded one through four, with the top seed hosting the fourth seed and second seed hosting the third. The visiting team will be designated as the home team in the second game of each series.

Team	Wins	Losses	Pct.	GB	Seed
Navy	13	7	.650	–	1
Lehigh	12	8	.600	1	2
Holy Cross	12	8	.600	1	3
Lafayette	9	11	.450	4	4
Bucknell	8	12	.400	5	–
Army	6	14	.300	7	–

== Results ==
Semifinals
1	Navy	8	12	8
4	Lafayette	10	0	0
2	Lehigh	6	4	7
3	Holy Cross	2	7	1

Finals
1	Navy	3	9	3
2	Lehigh	7	8	4
