= 2007 Patriot League baseball tournament =

Patriot League baseball tournament

- Teams: 3
- Format: Best of three series
- Finals site: Kamine Stadium; Easton, Pennsylvania
- Champions: Lafayette (1st title)
- Winning coach: Joe Kinney (1st title)
- MVP: Mike Raible (Lafayette)

2007 Patriot League baseball standings
| | Conf. | | | | | | Overall |
| Team | W | | L | | T | PCT | W | | L | | T | PCT |
|---|---|---|---|---|---|---|---|---|---|---|---|---|
| Lafayette ‍†‍‡‍^{y} | 17 | – | 3 | – | 0 | .850 | 33 | – | 20 | – | 0 | .623 |
| Army ‍‍‍ | 12 | – | 7 | – | 0 | .632 | 25 | – | 23 | – | 1 | .520 |
| Navy ‍‍‍ | 12 | – | 8 | – | 0 | .600 | 35 | – | 20 | – | 0 | .636 |
| Holy Cross ‍‍‍ | 8 | – | 11 | – | 0 | .421 | 12 | – | 23 | – | 0 | .343 |
| Bucknell ‍‍‍ | 8 | – | 12 | – | 0 | .400 | 16 | – | 24 | – | 0 | .400 |
| Lehigh ‍‍‍ | 2 | – | 18 | – | 0 | .100 | 13 | – | 30 | – | 1 | .307 |
‡ – Tournament champion y – Invited to the NCAA tournament As of June 30, 2007; Rankings from Collegiate Baseball

The 2007 Patriot League baseball tournament was held on May 13 and 14, 2007 to determine the champion of the Patriot League for baseball for the 2007 NCAA Division I baseball season. The event matched the top three finishers of the six team league in a double-elimination tournament. Top seeded Lafayette won their first championship and claimed the Patriot's automatic bid to the 2007 NCAA Division I baseball tournament. Mike Raible of Lafayette was named Tournament Most Valuable Player.

== Format and seeding ==
The top three finishers by conference winning percentage from the league's regular season advanced to the tournament. The top seed earned a first round by and the right to host the event. The second and third seeds played an elimination game, with the winner meeting the top seed in a best-of-three series.

| Team | W | L | Pct | GB | Seed |
|---|---|---|---|---|---|
| Lafayette | 17 | 3 | .850 | — | 1 |
| Army | 12 | 7 | .632 | 4.5 | 2 |
| Navy | 12 | 8 | .600 | 5 | 3 |
| Holy Cross | 8 | 11 | .421 | 8.5 | — |
| Bucknell | 8 | 12 | .400 | 9 | — |
| Lehigh | 2 | 18 | .100 | 15 | — |

== Results ==
| Semifinal | | | Final |
| | | | 1 | Lafayette | 8 | 7 | — |
| 2 | Army | 5 | 2 | Army | 3 | 3 | — |
| 3 | Navy | 3 |
