= 2013 Patriot League baseball tournament =

- Teams: 4
- Format: Best of three series
- Finals site: Fitton Field; Worcester, MA
- Champions: Army (7th title)
- Winning coach: Joe Sottolano (6th title)
- MVP: Chris Rowley (Army)

2013 Patriot League baseball standings
	Conf.				Overall
Team	W		L	PCT	W		L	PCT
Holy Cross ‍†‍‍	15	–	5	.750	28	–	25	.528
Navy ‍‍‍	13	–	7	.650	28	–	23	.549
Army ‍‍‡‍^{y}	11	–	9	.550	29	–	21	.580
Bucknell ‍‍‍	10	–	10	.500	16	–	33	.327
Lafayette ‍‍‍	6	–	14	.300	10	–	40	.200
Lehigh ‍‍‍	5	–	15	.250	18	–	29	.383
† – Conference champion ‡ – Tournament champion y – Invited to the NCAA tournament As of May 19, 2013; Rankings from Collegiate Baseball

The 2013 Patriot League baseball tournament was held on consecutive weekends, with the semifinals held May 11–12 and the finals May 19-20. The higher seeded teams hosted each best of three series. Third seeded Army defeated Holy Cross for the second year in a row, and Army's seventh tournament title, to earn the conference's automatic bid to the 2013 NCAA Division I baseball tournament. Army and Holy Cross met in the final for the second consecutive year.

== Seeding ==
The top four finishers from the regular season were seeded one through four, with the top seed hosting the fourth seed and second seed hosting the third. The visiting team wa designated as the home team in the second game of each series. In the semifinals, Holy Cross hosted Bucknell, while Navy hosted defending champion Army.

Team	Wins	Losses	Pct.	GB	Seed
Holy Cross	15	5	.750	–	1
Navy	13	7	.650	2	2
Army	11	9	.550	4	3
Bucknell	10	10	.500	5	4
Lafayette	6	14	.300	9	–
Lehigh	5	15	.250	10	–

== Results ==
Semifinals
1	Holy Cross	9	3	—
4	Bucknell	6	0	—
2	Navy	2	3	—
3	Army	4	7	—

Finals
1	Holy Cross	4	4	—
3	Army	9	5	—

=== Semifinals ===
==== Holy Cross vs. Bucknell ====
May 11, 2013 12:00 pm at Fitton Field, Worcester, MA
Team	1	2	3	4	5	6	7	8	9	R	H	E
4 Bucknell	0	1	0	2	0	3	0	0	0	6	9	1
1 Holy Cross	0	0	2	6	0	0	0	1	X	9	9	1
WP: Marra (4–4) LP: Hough (3–6) Sv: Colella (7); Home runs: Bucknell: Ogren; Holy Cross: None; Attendance: 447; Notes: Game 1 Boxscore

May 11, 2013 4:00 pm at Fitton Field, Worcester, MA
Team	1	2	3	4	5	6	7	8	9	R	H	E
1 Holy Cross	1	1	1	0	0	0	0	0	0	3	6	2
4 Bucknell	0	0	0	0	0	0	0	0	0	0	3	2
WP: Murray (7–3) LP: Weigel (2–8) Sv: Colella (8); Attendance: 437; Notes: Game 2 Boxscore

==== Army vs. Navy ====
May 11, 2013 12:00 pm at Terwilliger Brothers Field at Max Bishop Stadium, Annapolis, MD
Team	1	2	3	4	5	6	7	8	9	R	H	E
3 Army	0	0	0	3	0	1	0	0	0	4	8	0
2 Navy	1	0	0	1	0	0	0	0	0	2	5	0
WP: Rowley (8–3) LP: Moore (4–3); Notes: Game 1 Boxscore

May 11, 2013 4:00 pm at Terwilliger Brothers Field at Max Bishop Stadium, Annapolis, MD
Team	1	2	3	4	5	6	7	8	9	R	H	E
2 Navy	1	0	0	1	0	0	1	0	0	3	11	1
3 Army	0	0	3	0	0	0	0	4	X	7	8	0
WP: Larimer (2–2) LP: Parenti (3–4); Attendance: 1,250; Notes: Game 2 Boxscore

=== Final ===
May 19, 2013 1:00 at Fitton Field, Worcester, MA
Team	1	2	3	4	5	6	7	8	9	R	H	E
3 Army	3	0	0	0	0	0	5	0	1	9	11	0
1 Holy Cross	2	0	0	0	0	0	0	1	1	4	11	5
WP: Rowley (9–3) LP: Marra (4–5); Attendance: 913; Notes: Game 1 Boxscore

May 19, 2013 4:40 pm at Fitton Field, Worcester, MA
Team	1	2	3	4	5	6	7	8	9	R	H	E
1 Holy Cross	0	0	1	0	1	2	0	0	0	4	7	3
3 Army	1	0	1	0	2	0	0	0	1	5	8	1
WP: Hapeman (2–1) LP: Colella (2–4); Attendance: 913; Notes: Game 2 Boxscore

== All-Tournament Team ==
The following players were named to the All-Tournament Team.

Name	School
Chris Rowley	Army
McCants	Army
Grant Van Orden	Army
Harold Earls	Army
Patrick Puentes	Holy Cross
Donny Murray	Holy Cross
John Colella	Holy Cross
Rob Krentzman	Bucknell
Anthony Gingerelli	Bucknell
Dave Milanes	Navy
Anthony Parenti	Navy

=== Most Valuable Player ===
Chris Rowley was named Tournament Most Valuable Player. Rowley was a pitcher for Army, earning a complete game victory in game one of each series.
