= 1996 Patriot League baseball tournament =

- Teams: 3
- Format: Best of three series
- Finals site: Bucknell Field; Lewisburg, PA
- Champions: Bucknell (1st title)
- Winning coach: Gene Depew (1st title)
- MVP: Pete Cann (Bucknell)

1996 Patriot League baseball standings
	Conf.						Overall
Team	W		L		T	PCT	W		L		T	PCT
Bucknell ‍†‍‡‍^{y}	14	–	6	–	0	.700	24	–	23	–	0	.511
Lehigh ‍‍‍	12	–	8	–	0	.600	18	–	20	–	1	.474
Navy ‍‍‍	11	–	9	–	0	.550	24	–	28	–	0	.462
Army ‍‍‍	9	–	11	–	0	.450	20	–	21	–	0	.488
Lafayette ‍‍‍	9	–	11	–	0	.450	12	–	28	–	0	.300
Holy Cross ‍‍‍	5	–	15	–	0	.250	7	–	26	–	0	.212
‡ – Tournament champion y – Invited to the NCAA tournament As of June 30, 1996; Rankings from Collegiate Baseball

The 1996 Patriot League baseball tournament was held on May 4 and 5, 1996 to determine the champion of the Patriot League for baseball for the 1996 NCAA Division I baseball season. The event matched the top three finishers of the six team league in a double-elimination tournament. Regular season champion Bucknell won their first championship and then won a play-in round to advance to the 1996 NCAA Division I baseball tournament. Pete Cann of Bucknell was named Tournament Most Valuable Player.

== Format and seeding ==
The top three finishers by conference winning percentage from the league's regular season advanced to the tournament. The top seed earned a first round by and the right to host the event. The second and third seeds played an elimination game, with the winner meeting the top seed in a best-of-three series.

Team	W	L	Pct	GB	Seed
Bucknell	14	6	.700	—	1
Lehigh	12	8	.600	2	2
Navy	11	9	.550	3	3
Army	9	11	.450	5	—
Lafayette	9	11	.450	5	—
Holy Cross	5	15	.250	9	—

== Results ==
Semifinal			Final
			1	Bucknell	10	5	12
2	Lehigh	0	3	Navy	6	8	7
3	Navy	10
