= Sean Leary =

Sean Leary may refer to:

- Sean Leary (climber) (1975–2014), American climber and BASE jumper
- Sean Leary (baseball), American baseball coach and former shortstop
