= 2004 Patriot League baseball tournament =

- Teams: 3
- Format: Best of three series
- Finals site: Johnson Stadium at Doubleday Field; West Point, New York
- Champions: Army (3rd title)
- Winning coach: Joe Sottolano (2nd title)
- MVP: Justin Long (Army)

2004 Patriot League baseball standings
	Conf.						Overall
Team	W		L		T	PCT	W		L		T	PCT
Army ‍†‍‡‍^{y}	17	–	3	–	0	.850	37	–	15	–	0	.712
Lafayette ‍‍‍	11	–	9	–	0	.550	23	–	26	–	0	.469
Lehigh ‍‍‍	9	–	11	–	0	.450	25	–	21	–	0	.543
Holy Cross ‍‍‍	9	–	11	–	0	.450	14	–	22	–	1	.392
Bucknell ‍‍‍	7	–	13	–	0	.350	20	–	24	–	0	.455
Navy ‍‍‍	7	–	13	–	0	.350	14	–	36	–	0	.280
‡ – Tournament champion y – Invited to the NCAA tournament As of June 30, 2004; Rankings from Collegiate Baseball

The 2004 Patriot League baseball tournament was a collegiate baseball tournament held on May 8 and 9, 2004 to determine the champion of the Patriot League for baseball for the 2004 NCAA Division I baseball season. The event matched the top three finishers of the six team league in a double-elimination tournament. Top seeded Army won their third championship and claimed the Patriot's automatic bid to the 2004 NCAA Division I baseball tournament. Justin Long of Army was named Tournament Most Valuable Player.

== Format and seeding. ==
- The top three finishers by conference winning percentage from the league's regular season advanced to the tournament. The top seed earned a first round by and the right to host the event. The second and third seeds played an elimination game, with the winner meeting the top seed in a best-of-three series.

Team	W	L	Pct	GB	Seed
Army	17	3	.850	—	1
Lafayette	11	9	.550	6	2
Lehigh	9	11	.450	8	3
Holy Cross	9	11	.450	8	—
Bucknell	8	13	.350	9	—
Navy	7	13	.350	9	—

== Results ==
Semifinal			Final
			1	Army	3	16	—
2	Lafayette	7	2	Lafayette	1	2	—
3	Lehigh	6
