= 2019 Patriot League baseball tournament =

- Teams: 4
- Format: Best of three series
- Finals site: Max Bishop Stadium; Annapolis, Maryland
- Champions: Army (9th title)
- Winning coach: Jim Foster (3rd title)
- MVP: Jacob Hurtubise (Army)
- Television: PLN

2019 Patriot League baseball standings
	Conf.				Overall
Team	W		L	PCT	W		L	PCT
Navy ‍†‍‍	18	–	7	.720	39	–	17	.696
Army ‍‍‡‍^{y}	15	–	10	.600	35	–	26	.574
Holy Cross ‍‍‍	15	–	10	.600	22	–	32	.407
Lafayette ‍‍‍	12	–	13	.480	19	–	33	.365
Lehigh ‍‍‍	9	–	16	.360	21	–	28	.429
Bucknell ‍‍‍	6	–	19	.240	14	–	33	.298
† – Conference champion ‡ – Tournament champion y – Invited to the NCAA tournament As of June 4, 2019; Rankings from D1Baseball

The 2019 Patriot League baseball tournament took place on consecutive weekends, with the semifinals held May 11–12 and the finals May 17–19. The higher seeded teams hosted each best of three series. The winner, Army, earned the conference's automatic bid to the 2019 NCAA Division I baseball tournament.

== Seeding ==
The top four finishers from the regular season were seeded one through four, with the top seed hosting the fourth seed and the second seed hosting the third. The visiting team was designated as the home team in the second game of each series.

== Results ==
Semifinals
1	Navy	3	10	–
4	Lafayette	0	2	–
2	Holy Cross	1	6	3
3	Army	5	4	5

Finals
1	Navy	2	4	3
3	Army	6	2	4

== Championship series ==
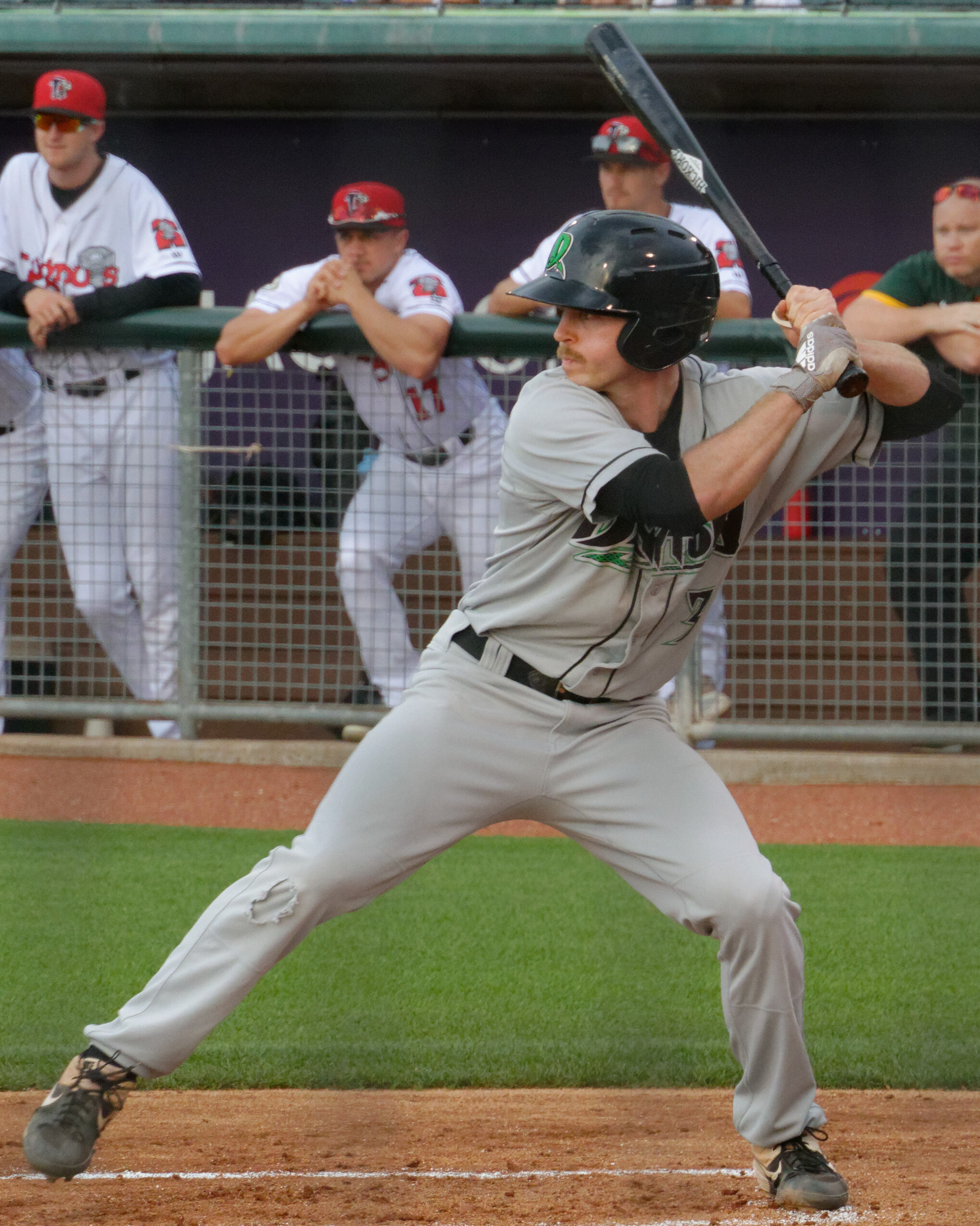
Tournament MVP Jacob Hurtubise

Patriot League Championship Series
(3) Army Black Knights	vs.	(1) Navy Midshipmen

May 17, 2019, 7:00 p.m. (EDT) at Max Bishop Stadium in Annapolis, Maryland
Team	1	2	3	4	5	6	7	8	9	R	H	E
(3) Army	2	3	0	0	0	0	0	0	1	6	9	2
(1) Navy	1	0	1	0	0	0	0	0	0	2	2	1
WP: Sam Messina (7–4) LP: Noah Song (11–1)

May 18, 2019, 2:00 p.m. (EDT) at Max Bishop Stadium in Annapolis, Maryland
Team	1	2	3	4	5	6	7	8	9	R	H	E
(3) Army	0	0	0	0	2	0	0	0	0	2	4	2
(1) Navy	0	3	0	0	0	0	1	0	X	4	11	0
WP: Jared Leins (3–1) LP: Tyler Giovinco (8–5) Sv: Jackson Zoch (1)

May 19, 2019, 2:00 p.m. (EDT) at Max Bishop Stadium in Annapolis, Maryland
Team	1	2	3	4	5	6	7	8	9	R	H	E
(3) Army	1	0	0	0	0	1	1	0	1	4	8	1
(1) Navy	0	0	0	1	1	0	0	1	0	3	6	0
WP: Cam Opp (5–1) LP: Trey Braithwaite (1–2); Home runs: ARMY: None; NAVY: Zach Biggers
