= 2009 Patriot League baseball tournament =

- Teams: 4
- Format: Best of three series
- Finals site: Johnson Stadium at Doubleday Field; West Point, New York
- Champions: Army (5th title)
- Winning coach: Joe Sottolano (4th title)
- MVP: Ben Koenigsfeld (Army)

2009 Patriot League baseball standings
	Conf.						Overall
Team	W		L		T	PCT	W		L		T	PCT
Bucknell ‍†‍‍	13	–	7	–	0	.650	22	–	25	–	0	.468
Army ‍†‍‡‍^{y}	13	–	7	–	0	.650	34	–	19	–	0	.642
Holy Cross ‍‍‍	11	–	7	–	0	.611	22	–	27	–	0	.449
Lafayette ‍‍‍	9	–	11	–	0	.450	24	–	29	–	0	.453
Navy ‍‍‍	8	–	12	–	0	.400	20	–	26	–	1	.436
Lehigh ‍‍‍	4	–	14	–	0	.222	11	–	36	–	1	.240
‡ – Tournament champion y – Invited to the NCAA tournament As of June 30, 2009; Rankings from Collegiate Baseball

The 2009 Patriot League baseball tournament was held on consecutive weekends with the semifinals held May 9–10 and the finals May 16–17, 2009 to determine the champion of the Patriot League for baseball for the 2009 NCAA Division I baseball season. The event matched the top four finishers of the six team league in a double-elimination tournament. Second seeded Army won their fifth championship and claimed the Patriot's automatic bid to the 2009 NCAA Division I baseball tournament. Ben Koenigsfeld of Army was named Tournament Most Valuable Player.

== Format and seeding ==
The top four finishers from the regular season were seeded one through four, with the top seed hosting the fourth seed and second seed hosting the third. The visiting team was designated as the home team in the second game of each series. Bucknell hosted Lafayette while Holy Cross visited Army.

Team	W	L	Pct	GB	Seed
Bucknell	13	7	.650	—	1
Army	13	7	.650	—	2
Holy Cross	11	7	.611	1	3
Lafayette	9	11	.450	4	4
Navy	8	12	.400	5	—
Lehigh	4	14	.222	8	—

== Results ==
Semifinals
1	Bucknell	6	9	2
4	Lafayette	4	20	10
2	Army	5	3	11
3	Holy Cross	1	5	0

Finals
4	Lafayette	2	1	—
2	Army	6	8	—

== All-Tournament Team ==
Name	School
Jeff Butler	Lafayette
Andy Ernesto	Army
Matt Fouch	Army
Rob Froio	Lafayette
Jake Gorman	Holy Cross
Ryan Hanna	Lafayette
Joey Henshaw	Army
Bobby Holmes	Holy Cross
Ben Koenigsfeld	Army
