= 2022 Patriot League baseball tournament =

- Teams: 4
- Format: Best of three series
- Finals site: Johnson Stadium at Doubleday Field; West Point, New York
- Champions: Army (11th title)
- Winning coach: Jim Foster (4th title)

2022 Patriot League baseball standings
	Conf.				Overall
Team	W		L	PCT	W		L	PCT
Army ‍†‍‡‍^{y}	18	–	7	.720	31	–	23	.574
Bucknell ‍‍‍	14	–	11	.560	22	–	26	.458
Lehigh ‍‍‍	12	–	13	.480	26	–	24	.520
Holy Cross ‍‍‍	11	–	14	.440	17	–	37	.315
Navy ‍‍‍	10	–	15	.400	19	–	26	.422
Lafayette ‍‍‍	10	–	15	.400	15	–	35	.300
† – Conference champion ‡ – Tournament champion y – Invited to the NCAA tournament Rankings from D1Baseball

The 2022 Patriot League baseball tournament took place on consecutive weekends, with the semifinals held on May 14–15 and the finals on May 24–26. The higher seeded teams hosted each best of three series. The winner, Army, earned the conference's automatic bid to the 2022 NCAA Division I baseball tournament.

== Seeding ==
The top four finishers from the regular season are seeded one through four, with the top seed hosting the fourth seed and second seed hosting the third. The visiting team will be designated as the home team in the second game of each series.

Team	W	L	Pct.	GB	Seed
Army	18	7	.720	—	1
Bucknell	14	11	.560	4	2
Lehigh	12	13	.480	6	3
Holy Cross	11	14	.440	7	4
Navy	10	15	.400	8	—
Lafayette	10	15	.400	8	—

== Results ==
Semifinals
1	Army	9	14	—
4	Holy Cross	3	2	—
2	Bucknell	10	7	—
3	Lehigh	8	4	—

Finals
1	Army	8	3	12
2	Bucknell	7	11	2
