= 2002 Patriot League baseball tournament =

- Teams: 3
- Format: Best of three series
- Finals site: Max Bishop Stadium; Annapolis, Maryland
- Champions: Navy (4th title)
- Winning coach: Steve Whitmyer (1st title)
- MVP: Matt Foster (Navy)

2002 Patriot League baseball standings
	Conf.						Overall
Team	W		L		T	PCT	W		L		T	PCT
Navy ‍†‍‡‍^{y}	13	–	7	–	0	.650	23	–	25	–	0	.479
Lehigh ‍†‍‍	13	–	7	–	0	.650	29	–	21	–	1	.578
Lafayette ‍‍‍	12	–	8	–	0	.600	23	–	22	–	0	.511
Army ‍‍‍	11	–	9	–	0	.550	22	–	21	–	0	.512
Bucknell ‍‍‍	6	–	14	–	0	.300	15	–	35	–	0	.300
Holy Cross ‍‍‍	5	–	15	–	0	.250	11	–	28	–	0	.282
‡ – Tournament champion y – Invited to the NCAA tournament As of June 30, 2002; Rankings from Collegiate Baseball

The 2002 Patriot League baseball tournament was held on May 11 and 12, 2002 to determine the champion of the Patriot League for baseball for the 2002 NCAA Division I baseball season. The event matched the top three finishers of the six team league in a double-elimination tournament. Top seeded Navy won their fourth championship and claimed the Patriot's automatic bid to the 2002 NCAA Division I baseball tournament. Matt Foster of Navy was named Tournament Most Valuable Player.

== Format and seeding ==
The top three finishers by conference winning percentage from the league's regular season advanced to the tournament. The top seed earned a first round by and the right to host the event. The second and third seeds played an elimination game, with the winner meeting the top seed in a best-of-three series.

Team	W	L	Pct	GB	Seed
Navy	13	7	.650	—	1
Lehigh	13	7	.650	—	2
Lafayette	12	8	.600	1	3
Army	11	9	.550	2	—
Bucknell	6	14	.300	7	—
Holy Cross	5	15	.250	8	—

== Results ==
Semifinal			Final
			1	Navy	5	11	—
2	Lehigh	12	2	Lehigh	3	7	—
3	Lafayette	6
