= 2018 Patriot League baseball tournament =

- Teams: 4
- Format: Best of three series
- Finals site: Max Bishop Stadium; Annapolis, Maryland
- Champions: Army (8th title)
- Winning coach: Jim Foster (1st title)
- MVP: Anthony Giachin (Army)
- Television: PLN (semifinals); Stadium (Championship)

2018 Patriot League baseball standings
	Conf.						Overall
Team	W		L		T	PCT	W		L		T	PCT
Navy ‍†‍‍	18	–	7	–	0	.720	36	–	13	–	0	.735
Army ‍†‍‡‍^{y}	18	–	7	–	0	.720	31	–	21	–	0	.596
Bucknell ‍‍‍	13	–	11	–	1	.540	16	–	25	–	1	.393
Holy Cross ‍‍‍	11	–	14	–	0	.440	17	–	25	–	0	.405
Lehigh ‍‍‍	10	–	15	–	0	.400	22	–	27	–	0	.449
Lafayette ‍‍‍	4	–	20	–	1	.180	16	–	34	–	1	.324
† – Conference champion ‡ – Tournament champion As of May 11, 2018; Rankings from Collegiate Baseball

The 2018 Patriot League baseball tournament took place on consecutive weekends, with the semifinals held May 12–13 and the finals May 18–20. The higher seeded teams each hosted best of three series. As champion, Army earned the conference's automatic bid to the 2018 NCAA Division I baseball tournament.

== Seeding ==
The top four finishers from the regular season were seeded one through four, with the top seed hosting the fourth seed and second seed hosting the third. The visiting team was designated as the home team in the second game of each series. Navy hosted Holy Cross while Army hosted Bucknell in the semifinals. Navy hosted Army in the final after both teams won their previous series.

Team	W	L	T	Pct.	GB	Seed
Navy	18	7	0	.720	—	1
Army	18	7	0	.720	—	2
Bucknell	13	11	1	.540	4.5	3
Holy Cross	11	14	0	.440	7	4
Lehigh	10	15	0	.400	8	—
Lafayette	4	20	1	.180	13.5	—

== Results ==
Semifinals
1	Navy	2	4	4
4	Holy Cross	4	0	1
2	Army	1	11	4
3	Bucknell	4	7	3

Finals
1	Navy	5	3
2	Army	8	5
