= 2012 Patriot League baseball tournament =

- Teams: 4
- Format: Best of three series
- Finals site: Johnson Stadium at Doubleday Field; West Point, NY
- Champions: Army (6th title)
- Winning coach: Joe Sottolano (5th title)
- MVP: Zach Price (Army)

2012 Patriot League baseball standings
	Conf.						Overall
Team	W		L		T	PCT	W		L		T	PCT
Army ‍†‍‡‍^{y}	18	–	2	–	0	.900	41	–	15	–	0	.732
Holy Cross ‍‍‍	13	–	7	–	0	.650	33	–	22	–	0	.600
Navy ‍‍‍	9	–	11	–	0	.450	23	–	29	–	0	.442
Lafayette ‍‍‍	7	–	13	–	0	.350	14	–	37	–	1	.279
Bucknell ‍‍‍	7	–	13	–	0	.350	21	–	28	–	0	.429
Lehigh ‍‍‍	6	–	14	–	0	.300	18	–	31	–	1	.370
† – Conference champion ‡ – Tournament champion y – Invited to the NCAA tournament As of June 30, 2012; Rankings from Collegiate Baseball

The 2012 Patriot League baseball tournament was held on consecutive weekends, with the semifinals held May 12–13 and the finals May 19-20. The higher seeded teams hosted each best of three series. Top seeded Army won their sixth championship and earned the conference's automatic bid to the 2012 NCAA Division I baseball tournament.

== Seeding ==
The top four finishers from the regular season were seeded one through four, with the top seed hosting the fourth seed and second seed hosting the third. The visiting team was designated as the home team in the second game of each series. Army hosted Lafayette, while Holy Cross hosted Navy in the semifinals. Holy Cross traveled to Army for the final.

Team	Wins	Losses	Pct.	GB	Seed
Army	18	2	.900	–	1
Holy Cross	13	7	.650	5	2
Navy	9	11	.450	9	3
Lafayette	7	13	.350	11	4
Bucknell	7	13	.350	11	–
Lehigh	6	14	.300	12	–

== Results ==
Semifinals
4	Lafayette	7	3	–
1	Army	8	6	–
3	Navy	0	2	–
2	Holy Cross	1	4	–

Finals
2	Holy Cross	0	7	4
1	Army	4	4	8

=== Semifinals ===
==== Lafayette vs. Army ====
May 12, 2012 12:11 pm at Johnson Stadium at Doubleday Field, West Point, NY
Team	1	2	3	4	5	6	7	8	9	R	H	E
4 Lafayette	2	3	0	1	0	0	0	1	0	7	9	1
1 Army	0	0	0	1	0	6	1	0	X	8	10	0
WP: Rowley LP: Boyce Sv: Carroll; Home runs: Lafayette: None; Army: McCants, Watkins; Notes: Game 1 Boxscore

May 12, 2012 4:01 pm at Johnson Stadium at Doubleday Field, West Point, NY
Team	1	2	3	4	5	6	7	8	9	R	H	E
1 Army	2	0	0	0	1	0	1	2	0	6	10	2
4 Lafayette	1	0	0	0	0	1	1	0	0	3	11	1
WP: Lee LP: Schwartz Sv: Carroll; Home runs: Army: None; Lafayette: Dunleavy; Attendance: 419; Notes: Game 2 Boxscore

==== Navy vs. Holy Cross ====
May 12, 2012 2:04 pm at Fitton Field, Worcester, MA
Team	1	2	3	4	5	6	7	8	9	R	H	E
3 Navy	0	0	0	0	0	0	0	0	0	0	3	3
2 Holy Cross	0	0	0	0	0	1	0	0	X	1	7	0
WP: Koneski LP: Gainey Sv: Colella; Attendance: 524; Notes: Game 1 Boxscore

May 12, 2012 5:05 pm at Fitton Field, Worceser, MA
Team	1	2	3	4	5	6	7	8	9	10	R	H	E
2 Holy Cross	0	0	0	2	0	0	0	0	0	2	4	6	0
3 Navy	0	0	0	0	2	0	0	0	0	0	2	4	0
WP: Colella LP: Rinehart; Home runs: Holy Cross: None; Navy: Simonsen; Attendance: 522; Notes: Game 2 Boxscore

=== Final ===
May 20, 2012 12:09 pm at Johnson Stadium at Doubleday Field, West Point, NY
Team	1	2	3	4	5	6	7	8	9	R	H	E
2 Holy Cross	0	0	0	0	0	0	0	0	0	0	3	1
1 Army	0	0	0	0	2	2	0	0	X	4	8	0
WP: Lee LP: Koneski; Notes: Game 1 Boxscore

May 20, 2012 at Johnson Stadium at Doubleday Field, West Point, NY
Team	1	2	3	4	5	6	7	8	9	R	H	E
1 Army	0	0	1	0	0	2	1	0	0	4	6	3
2 Holy Cross	0	0	0	2	1	0	2	2	X	7	10	5
WP: Colella LP: Fernandez; Home runs: Army: None; Holy Cross: Enos, Cipolla; Attendance: 617; Notes: Game 2 Boxscore

May 21, 2012 12:00 pm at Johnson Stadium at Doubleday Field, West Point, NY
Team	1	2	3	4	5	6	7	8	9	R	H	E
2 Holy Cross	0	0	1	1	1	1	0	0	0	4	6	2
1 Army	0	0	2	0	0	2	4	0	X	8	12	1
WP: Carroll LP: Murray; Home runs: Holy Cross: Puentes; Army: Watkins; Attendance: 519; Notes: Game suspended after 6 innings, tied at 4. Resumed Tuesday, May 22.

== All-Tournament Team ==
The following players were named to the All-Tournament Team.

POS	Name	School	Class
SP	Logan Lee	Army	Sr.
1B	Kevin McKague	Army	Sr.
2B	Zach Price	Army	Sr.
C	J.T. Watkins	Army	Sr.
3B	Mike Ahmed	Holy Cross	So.
CF	Brandon Cipolla	Holy Cross	So.
1B	Jordan Enos	Holy Cross	Jr.
C	Parker Hills	Lafayette	Fr.
CF	Andrew Santomauro	Lafayette	So.
SP	Preston Gainey	Navy	So.
SP	Ben Nelson	Navy	Jr.

=== Most Valuable Player ===
Zach Price was named tournament Most Valuable Player. Price was a senior second baseman for Army.
