= 2010 Patriot League baseball tournament =

2010 sports event

- Teams: 4
- Format: Best of three series
- Finals site: Fitton Field; Worcester, Massachusetts
- Champions: Bucknell (5th title)
- Winning coach: Gene Depew (5th title)
- MVP: Doug Shribman (Bucknell)

2010 Patriot League baseball standings
	Conf.				Overall
Team	W		L	PCT	W		L	PCT
Army ‍†‍‍	16	–	4	.800	28	–	17	.622
Lehigh ‍‍‍	12	–	8	.600	23	–	27	.460
Holy Cross ‍‍‍	10	–	10	.500	26	–	26	.500
Bucknell ‍‍‡‍^{y}	8	–	12	.400	23	–	25	.479
Lafayette ‍‍‍	7	–	13	.350	15	–	30	.333
Navy ‍‍‍	7	–	13	.350	30	–	21	.588
‡ – Tournament champion y – Invited to the NCAA tournament As of June 30, 2010; Rankings from Collegiate Baseball

The 2010 Patriot League baseball tournament was held on consecutive weekends with the semifinals held May 15–16 and the finals May 21–22, 2010 to determine the champion of the Patriot League for baseball for the 2010 NCAA Division I baseball season. The event matched the top four finishers of the six team league in a double-elimination tournament. Fourth seeded Bucknell won their fifth championship and claimed the Patriot's automatic bid to the 2010 NCAA Division I baseball tournament. Doug Shribman of Bucknell was named Tournament Most Valuable Player.

== Format and seeding ==
The top four finishers from the regular season were seeded one through four, with the top seed hosting the fourth seed and second seed hosting the third. The visiting team was designated as the home team in the second game of each series. Bucknell hosted Lafayette while Holy Cross visited Army.

Team	W	L	Pct	GB	Seed
Army	16	4	.800	—	1
Lehigh	12	8	.600	4	2
Holy Cross	10	10	.500	6	3
Bucknell	8	12	.400	8	4
Lafayette	7	13	.350	9	—
Navy	7	13	.350	9	—

== Results ==
Semifinals
1	Army	9	6	7
4	Bucknell	11	4	11
2	Lehigh	1	4	0
3	Holy Cross	2	1	3

Finals
4	Bucknell	7	4	12
3	Holy Cross	8	3	7

== All-Tournament Team ==
Name	School
Andrew Berger	Lehigh
Andrew Brouse	Bucknell
Ryan Ebner	Bucknell
Ben Koenigsfeld	Army
Nate Koneski	Holy Cross
Ken Longernecker	Lehigh
Kevin McKague	Army
Matt Perry	Holy Cross
Doug Shribman	Bucknell
Stephen Wadsworth	Holy Cross
Ben Yoder	Bucknell
