= 2021 Patriot League baseball tournament =

- Teams: 4
- Format: Best of three series
- Finals site: Lehigh University Baseball Field; Bethlehem, Pennsylvania
- Champions: Army (11th title)
- Winning coach: Jim Foster (3rd title)
- MVP: Ross Friedrick (Army)
- Television: ESPN+

2021 Patriot League baseball standings
	Conf.				Overall
Team	W		L	PCT	W		L	PCT
North Division
Army ‍‍‡‍^{y}	15	–	10	.600	28	–	25	.528
Lafayette ‍‍‍	12	–	13	.480	14	–	17	.452
Holy Cross ‍‍‍	9	–	15	.375	10	–	20	.333
South Division
Lehigh ‍†‍‍	17	–	10	.630	24	–	19	.558
Navy ‍‍‍	11	–	12	.478	17	–	15	.531
Bucknell ‍‍‍	11	–	15	.423	11	–	22	.333
† – Conference champion ‡ – Tournament champion y – Invited to the NCAA tournament As of June 5, 2021; Rankings from D1Baseball

The 2021 Patriot League baseball tournament took place in consecutive weeks, with the semifinals held May 15–16 and the finals May 26–28. The higher seeded teams hosted each best of three series. The winner will earn the conference's automatic bid to the 2021 NCAA Division I baseball tournament.

== Seeding ==
The top four finishers from the regular season were seeded one through four, with the top seed hosting the fourth seed and second seed hosting the third. The visiting team was designated as the home team in the second game of each series.

== Results ==
Semifinals
1	Lehigh	10	1	5
4	Navy	5	3	0
2	Army	8	1	7
3	Lafayette	6	10	3

Finals
1	Lehigh	7	3	1
3	Army	22	1	6
