= Paul R. Calvert =

American athlete and coach (1908–1990)

Biographical details
- Born: July 10, 1908; Terre Haute, Indiana, U.S.
- Died: November 23, 1990 (aged 82); Kettering, Ohio, U.S.

Playing career

Football
- 1929–1931: Purdue
- Position: End

Coaching career (HC unless noted)

Football
- 1932: Missouri (freshmen)
- 1933–1940: Lehigh (freshmen)
- 1941: Moravian (assistant)

Men's basketball
- 1933–1937: Lehigh (freshmen)
- 1937–1941: Lehigh

Baseball
- 1934–1937: Lehigh (freshmen)
- 1938–1941: Lehigh

Head coaching record
- Overall: 27–36 (.429) (men's basketball); 17–40 (.298) (baseball)

Paul Robert Calvert (July 10, 1908 – November 23, 1990) was an American athlete and coach who was the head men's basketball and baseball coach at Lehigh University.

== Career ==
Calvert played end for the Purdue Boilermakers football team from 1929 to 1931. He began his coaching career in 1932, as an assistant to former Purdue aide Frank Carideo at Missouri. In 1933, he became the freshman football, basketball, and baseball coach at Lehigh. He was promoted to varsity men's basketball coach in 1937. Over four seasons, he compiled a 27–35 record. From 1938 to 1941, he was Lehigh's varsity baseball coach and amassed an 18–40 record. Calvert left Lehigh in 1941 and served as an assistant football coach at Moravian College that fall.

== Personal life ==
In 1934, Calvert married Lillian Makar of East Chicago, Indiana. They were both graduates of Purdue University. Calvert died on November 23, 1990.
