= 2016 Patriot League baseball tournament =

- Teams: 4
- Format: Best of three series
- Finals site: Max Bishop Stadium; Annapolis, Maryland
- Champions: Navy (6th title)
- Winning coach: Paul Kostacopoulos (2nd title)
- MVP: Leland Saile (Navy)
- Television: PLN

2016 Patriot League baseball standings
	Conf.						Overall
Team	W		L		T	PCT	W		L		T	PCT
Navy ‍†‍‡‍^{y}	15	–	5	–	0	.750	43	–	16	–	1	.725
Holy Cross ‍‍‍	14	–	6	–	0	.700	30	–	27	–	0	.526
Lehigh ‍‍‍	9	–	10	–	0	.474	25	–	29	–	0	.463
Bucknell ‍‍‍	8	–	12	–	0	.400	18	–	34	–	0	.346
Lafayette ‍‍‍	7	–	13	–	0	.350	14	–	29	–	0	.326
Army ‍‍‍	6	–	13	–	0	.316	16	–	32	–	0	.333
‡ – Tournament champion y – Invited to the NCAA tournament As of June 11, 2016; Rankings from Collegiate Baseball

The 2016 Patriot League baseball tournament took place on consecutive weekends, with the semifinals held May 14–15 and the finals May 22–23 near the close of the 2016 NCAA Division I baseball season. The higher seeded teams hosted each best of three series. Navy won the tournament for the sixth time and earned the conference's automatic bid to the 2016 NCAA Division I baseball tournament.

== Seeding ==
The top four finishers from the regular season were seeded one through four, with the top seed hosting the fourth seed and second seed hosting the third. The visiting team was designated as the home team in the second game of each series.

Team	W	L	Pct	GB	Seed
Navy	15	5	.750	—	1
Holy Cross	14	6	.700	1	2
Lehigh	9	10	.474	5.5	3
Bucknell	8	12	.400	7	4
Lafayette	7	13	.350	8	—
Army	6	13	.316	8.5	—

== Results ==
Semifinals
1	Navy	3	5	13
4	Bucknell	9	3	6
2	Holy Cross	9	5	12
3	Lehigh	4	18	8

Finals
1	Navy	2	2	1
2	Holy Cross	1	3	0
