= Jim Foster (baseball) =

American baseball coach

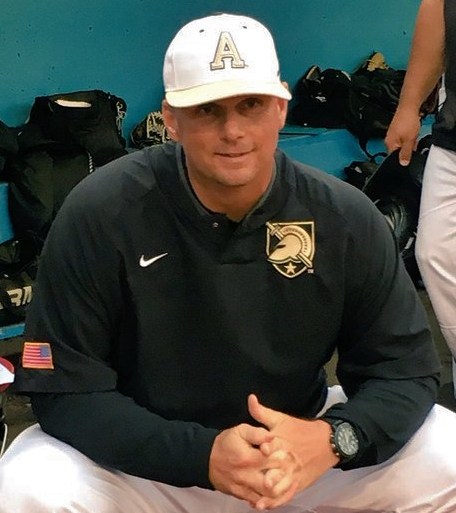
- Foster in 2017

Biographical details
- Born: August 18, 1971 (age 54); Warwick, Rhode Island, U.S.

Playing career
- 1990–1993: Providence
- Position: Catcher

Coaching career (HC unless noted)
- 2004–2005: Brown (asst.)
- 2006–2014: Rhode Island
- 2015–2016: Boston College (assoc. HC)
- 2017–2022: Army
- 2023: Northwestern

Head coaching record
- Overall: 440–410–3 (.518)
- Tournaments: NCAA: 1–8 (.111)

Accomplishments and honors

Championships
- 2× A-10 regular season (2006, 2013); 2x Patriot regular season (2018, 2022); 3× Patriot tournament (2018, 2019, 2021)

Awards
- A-10 Coach of the Year (2011)

James Thomas Foster (born August 18, 1971) is an American baseball coach and former catcher, who was most recently the head coach of Northwestern Wildcats. He played college baseball for the Providence Friars from 1990 to 1993. He served as the head coach of the Rhode Island Rams (2006–2014) and the Army Black Knights (2017–2022).

== Early life and playing career ==
Born in Warwick, Rhode Island, Foster attended Bishop Hendricken High School and Providence College and played at catcher on the Providence Friars baseball team under Paul Kostacopoulos, where he was named MVP of the 1992 Big East Conference baseball tournament. As a senior in 1993, Foster had the Friars' best batting average at .386, in addition to 61 hits, 38 RBI, and seven homers.

Selected by the Baltimore Orioles in the 22nd round of the 1993 MLB draft, Foster played for the Orioles organization from 1993 to 1999, starting with the Bluefield Orioles. In 1999 and 2000, Foster also played for the Anaheim Angels, Arizona Diamondbacks, and Chicago White Sox organizations. He ended his professional baseball career with the Birmingham Barons and Charlotte Knights in 2000. Foster was a Topps All-Rookie honoree in 1993 and Baseball Weekly Minor League Catcher of the Year in 1997.

== Coaching career ==
In 2004, Foster was an assistant coach at Brown University. In 2005, he was an assistant coach at the University of Rhode Island.

Foster served as head baseball coach at the University of Rhode Island from 2006 to 2014, compiling a record of 268–230–3. The 2006 and 2013 Rhode Island teams won Atlantic 10 Conference regular season titles. Following a 13–40 season, Foster resigned on July 17, 2014, with three years remaining on his contract to accept the associate head coach job with Boston College.

Foster served as associate head coach at Boston College in 2015 and 2016 under Mike Gambino.

Foster was named head baseball coach at the United States Military Academy on June 23, 2016. After a 25–31 season in 2017, Army won both the Patriot League regular season and tournament titles in 2018 and qualified for the NCAA tournament. In the NCAA tournament, Army went 1–2 in the regional round, including a 5–1 upset of regional host and nationally ranked NC State on opening day.

On June 28, 2022, Foster was named the head baseball coach of the Northwestern Wildcats. On July 13, 2023, Foster was fired after an investigation by the university human resources department revealed “bullying and a toxic environment within the program".

== Head coaching record ==
Statistics overview
Season	Team	Overall	Conference	Standing	Postseason
Rhode Island Rams (Atlantic 10 Conference) (2006–2014)
2006	Rhode Island	34–16	17–6	1st	
2007	Rhode Island	23–30	16–11	5th	
2008	Rhode Island	31–27–1	15–11–1	5th	
2009	Rhode Island	37–20–1	19–6	2nd	
2010	Rhode Island	31–26	17–10	3rd	
2011	Rhode Island	31–22	16–8	2nd	
2012	Rhode Island	33–25–1	16–8	3rd	
2013	Rhode Island	35–24	17–7	T–1st	
2014	Rhode Island	13–40	7–18	11th	
Rhode Island:		268–230–3 (.538)	140–85–1 (.622)		
Army Black Knights (Patriot League) (2017–2022)
2017	Army	25–31	10–10	T–3rd	
2018	Army	37–24	18–7	T–1st	NCAA Regional
2019	Army	35–26	15–10	T-2nd	NCAA Regional
2020	Army	6–9	0–0		Season canceled due to COVID-19
2021	Army	28–25	15–11	1st (North)	NCAA Regional
2022	Army	31–25	18–7	1st	NCAA Regional
Army:		162–140 (.536)	76–45 (.628)		
Northwestern Wildcats (Big Ten Conference) (2023)
2023	Northwestern	10–40	4–20	13th	
Northwestern:		10–40 (.200)	4–20 (.167)		
Total:		440–410–3 (.518)			
National champion Postseason invitational champion Conference regular season champion Conference regular season and conference tournament champion Division regular season champion Division regular season and conference tournament champion Conference tournament champion
