= 1993 ECAC baseball tournament =

1993 Eastern College Athletic Conference baseball tournament
- Teams: 8
- Format: Double-elimination tournament
- Finals site: Municipal Stadium; Waterbury, Connecticut
- Champions: Fordham
- Winning coach: Dan Gallagher

The 1993 Eastern College Athletic Conference baseball tournament was held from May 19 through 23 at Municipal Stadium in Waterbury, Connecticut. It matched teams from the Eastern College Athletic Conference, a loose arrangement of college baseball teams from the northeastern United States at the end of the 1993 NCAA Division I baseball season. The champion received an automatic bid to the 1993 NCAA Division I baseball tournament. Fordham won the championship.

== Bracket ==
Round 1	Round 2	Quarterfinals	Final
Fordham	13
LIU Post	6
Fordham	5
St Francis	3
St. Francis (NY)	1^{10}
Navy	0
Fordham	10
Le Moyne	6
Le Moyne	7
Iona	5
Le Moyne	16
Fairleigh Dickinson	8
Fairleigh Dickinson	9
Fairfield	7	Fordham	2	15
Le Moyne	15	14
Lower round 1	Lower round 2	Lower round 3	Lower final
Fairleigh Dickinson	13
LIU Post	5	Navy	7	Le Moyne	12
Navy	9	Fairleigh Dickinson	7	Fairleigh Dickinson	11
St. Francis	6
St Francis	13
Iona	10	Iona	4
Fairfield	9
