= Noah Song =

American baseball player (born 1997)

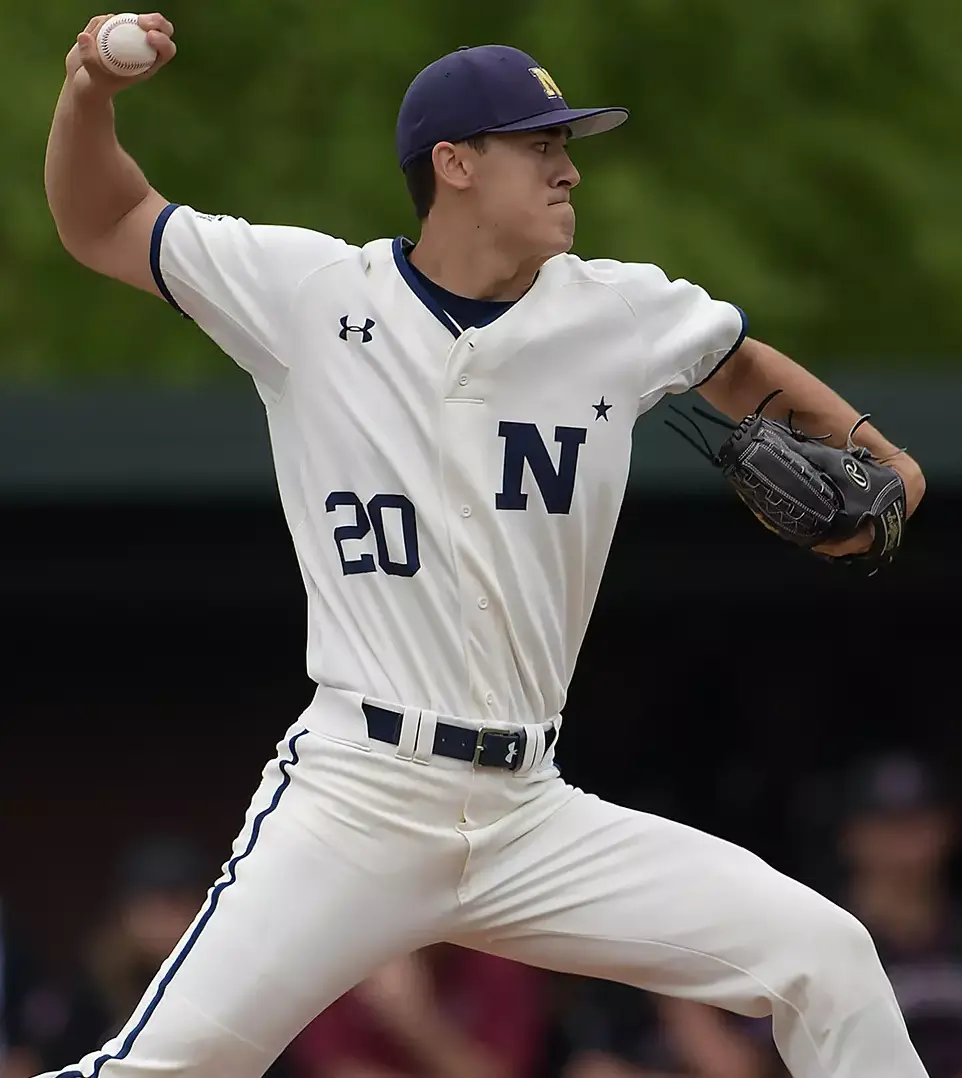
- Song with Navy in 2019

Boston Red Sox
- Pitcher
- Born: May 28, 1997 (age 29); Pomona, California, U.S.
- Bats: Right Throws: Right

Noah Benjamin Song (born May 28, 1997) is an American professional baseball pitcher in the Boston Red Sox organization, and a member of the United States Navy Selected Reserve. Song played college baseball for the Navy Midshipmen, and graduated from the United States Naval Academy in 2019. That season, he led NCAA Division I baseball in strikeouts, and in strikeouts-per-nine-innings. His fastball has been measured at 99 miles per hour (159 km/h). Song did not play professional baseball during the 2020–2022 seasons due to serving as an officer in the Navy.

== Amateur career ==
Song graduated from Claremont High School in Claremont, California, in 2015. Playing baseball for the high school team, in 2015 he received a Perfect Game All-California honorable mention and was named to the All-Sierra League second team.

Undrafted out of high school, Song attended the United States Naval Academy in Annapolis, Maryland, where he earned an engineering degree. In his freshman season of 2016, initially throwing in the mid-80s, Song produced a 9–3 record with a 2.75 earned run average (ERA) and 57 strikeouts over 75 1/3 innings. He was named the Patriot League rookie of the year and a Louisville Slugger Freshman All-American.

In his sophomore season in 2017, he went 6–4 with a 3.67 ERA and 89 strikeouts over 76 innings. During the summer of 2017, Song played in the Cape Cod League for the Harwich Mariners. In his junior season of 2018, Song produced a 6–5 record with a 1.92 ERA and 121 strikeouts over 89 innings. Song once again played in the Cape Cod League during the summer of 2018, this time for the Orleans Firebirds.

In his senior season of 2019, by which time his fastball velocity had increased to 95–97 mph and he added an 82–86 mph slider, Song produced an 11–1 record with a 1.44 ERA and 161 strikeouts (a new Navy record) over 94 innings. His 161 strikeouts was 3rd in NCAA Division I baseball in 2019, as did his strikeouts-per-nine-innings mark of 15.41 (the best in NCAA Division I since 2009, and 6th-best all-time in Division I history).

In his Navy career, he set school records for career wins (32), strikeouts (428), and innings pitched (334 1/3), and tied for the most shutouts in school history (9). During his time with Navy, Song won numerous awards and distinctions. He was a finalist for the 2019 Golden Spikes Award and 2019 Dick Howser Trophy. He was named the 2019 Patriot League Pitcher of the Year. He was named a 2019 First Team All-American by Collegiate Baseball, Baseball America, Perfect Game, NCBWA, D1Baseball, ABCA, and the National College Baseball Hall of Fame.

== Baseball career ==
=== Team USA ===
On October 10, 2019, Song was selected for the United States national baseball team in the 2019 WBSC Premier 12. In the tournament, his pitches were measured as fast as 99 mph (159 km/h). He was 0–0 with a 0.00 ERA in five relief appearances covering 5 1/3 innings, during which he gave up one hit and struck out six batters.

=== Boston Red Sox ===
Song was drafted by the Boston Red Sox in the 4th round, with the 137th overall selection, of the 2019 MLB draft. He became the highest selected MLB draft pick in Naval Academy history, and the ninth Navy graduate picked in the MLB draft. On June 6, 2019, Song signed with Boston.

Song spent his professional debut season of 2019 with the Lowell Spinners of the Low–A New York–Penn League, going 0–0 with a 1.06 ERA, a .167 batting average against, an 0.88 WHIP, and 19 strikeouts over 17 innings. Song did not play in the Boston organization after 2019, due to his military obligations.

=== Philadelphia Phillies ===
On December 7, 2022, Song was selected by the Philadelphia Phillies in the 2022 Rule 5 draft. On February 22, 2023, the Phillies announced that the Navy granted Song's request to change his duty status, allowing him to pursue his baseball career. In spring training, Song was shut down from throwing due to back tightness and was placed on the injured list to begin the season. On June 28, Song made his first professional appearance in almost 4 years, and tossed a perfect frame for the Single–A Clearwater Threshers. After rehab stints with the Double–A Reading Fightin Phils and Triple–A Lehigh Valley IronPigs, Song was activated from the injured list on July 29 and subsequently designated for assignment.

=== Boston Red Sox (second stint) ===
On August 4, 2023, after clearing waivers, Song was returned to the Boston Red Sox organization. In 7 games (6 starts) for the High–A Greenville Drive, he recorded a 4.15 ERA with 15 strikeouts across 21 2/3 innings pitched.

On March 27, 2024, it was revealed that Song required Tommy John surgery, ruling him out for the entirety of the 2024 season.

In 2025, he pitched in 31 games (4 starts) across 5 levels of the minors throwing 55 innings going 3-1 with a 4.58 ERA with 61 strikeouts and one save.

In 2026, he pitched in 41 games for Triple-A Worcester Red Sox throwing 73 innings of relief going 4-2 with a 5.42 ERA with 80 strikeouts and 2 saves.

== Naval career ==
Song was originally accepted to the Navy pilot program in college, but had to change after being deemed too tall at 6 feet 4 inches (1.93 m) to operate planes and helicopters in the field. His job path was then changed to a Naval flight officer and flight mission commander, serving on helicopters. Song was originally scheduled to report to Naval Air Station Pensacola on November 1, 2019, to start training as a naval flight officer and begin his five-year commitment to serve, until he was selected to play for the United States national baseball team at the 2019 WBSC Premier 12 tournament during November 2–17. After the tournament, he was scheduled to report to flight school in Pensacola in December 2019.

In December 2019, Admiral Robert P. Burke, Vice Chief of Naval Operations, denied Song’s petition to delay his active service time, requiring Song to attend flight school and delay his professional baseball career. Acting Secretary of the Navy Thomas Modly, along with Defense Secretary Mark Esper, could grant Song a waiver—against Admiral Burke's recommendation—but a Navy spokesperson said that no final decision had been made.

In June 2020, it was reported that Song had received orders to report to flight school in Pensacola by June 26. He was expected to be eligible to apply for early release from his training in May 2021. In May 2022, it was reported that Song had completed his flight training, and applied for a waiver to return to playing baseball. In February 2023, the Navy granted Song's request, allowing him to change status from active duty to selected reserve.

== Personal life ==
Song's father, Bill, immigrated to the United States from South Korea at the age of five. Bill has been a member of the Los Angeles County Sheriff’s Department, where he is a commander, since 1991. Song does not speak Korean but grew up eating Korean food. Song's mother, Stacy, is a special education instructional assistant. Song has three siblings.

== See also ==
- Rule 5 draft results
