= Chris Rowley =

American baseball player (born 1990)

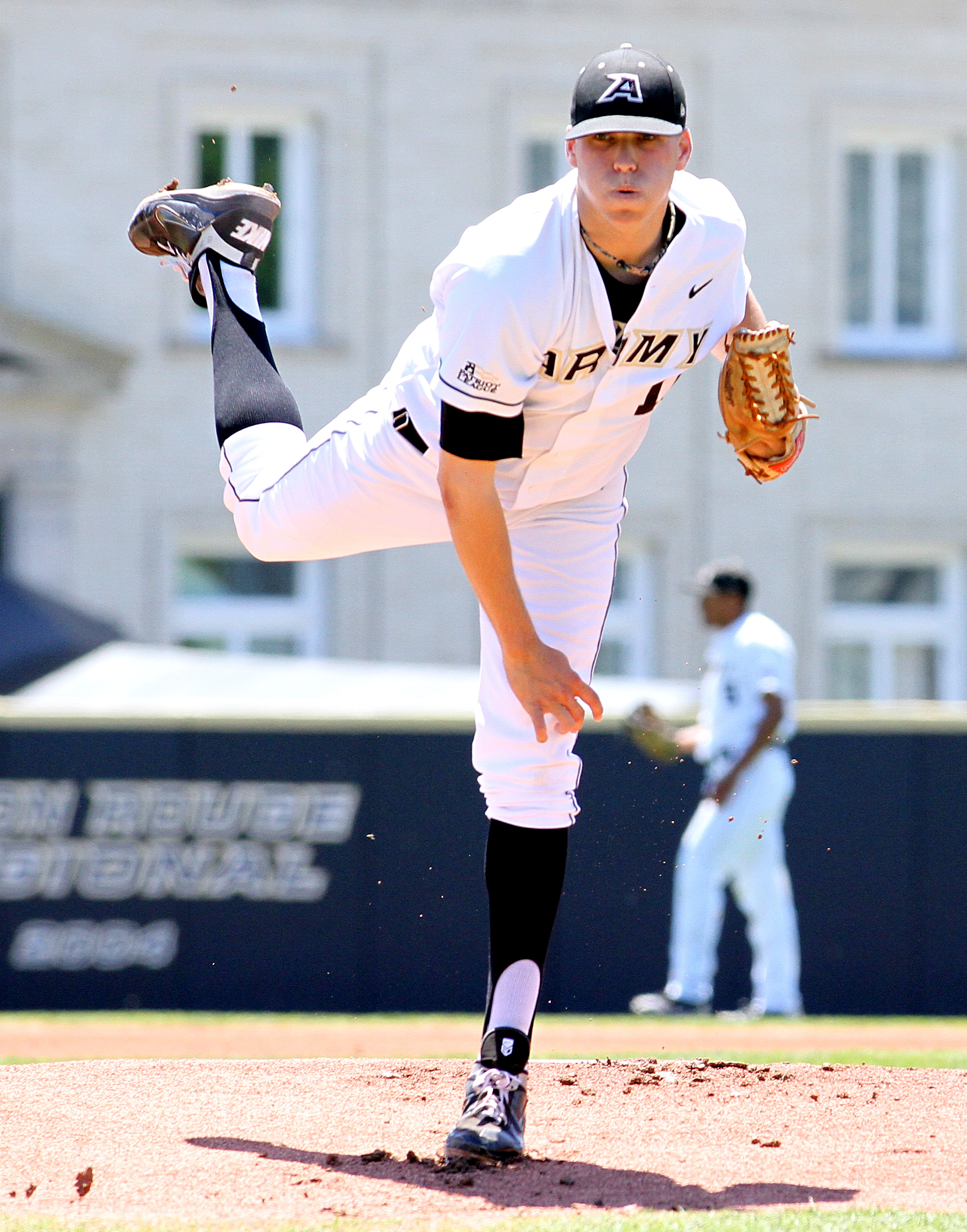
- Rowley with Army in 2012
- Pitcher
- Born: August 14, 1990 (age 36); Atlanta, Georgia, U.S.
- Batted: Right Threw: Right

MLB debut
- August 12, 2017, for the Toronto Blue Jays

Last MLB appearance
- July 15, 2018, for the Toronto Blue Jays

MLB statistics
- Win–loss record: 1–3
- Earned run average: 7.91
- Strikeouts: 11
- Stats at Baseball Reference

Teams
- Toronto Blue Jays (2017–2018)

Christopher Ryan Rowley (born August 14, 1990) is an American attorney, legal scholar, and former professional baseball pitcher. He played in Major League Baseball (MLB) for the Toronto Blue Jays. He was also a first lieutenant in the United States Army. Upon his major-league debut in August 2017, Rowley became the first West Point graduate to play in MLB.

== High school and college ==
Rowley attended South Forsyth High School in Cumming, Georgia, where he set school records in wins, earned run average (ERA), and strikeouts. After high school, Rowley was offered college baseball scholarships by Mercer University and the United States Military Academy (also called West Point). He chose the Military Academy over Mercer, as the Army Black Knights offered him a chance to start games, while the Mercer Bears wanted him in the bullpen, working as a relief pitcher. In his first season with Army, he appeared in three games for the Black Knights and posted a 13.00 ERA in nine innings pitched. The following year, Rowley pitched to a 5–4 win–loss record, 4.68 ERA, and 54 strikeouts in 73 total innings. Rowley finished the 2012 campaign with an 11–1 record, which included six complete games and five shutouts, and added a 2.40 earned run average and 80 strikeouts in 97 1/3 innings. Following the season, he was named the Patriot League's Pitcher of the Year. In his final season with the Black Knights, Rowley went 9–4 with a 2.67 ERA and 75 strikeouts in 97 2/3 innings pitched.

== Professional career ==
=== Toronto Blue Jays ===
==== Minor leagues and military ====
Chris Rowley
- Born: August 14, 1990 (age 36); Atlanta, Georgia
- Military career
- Allegiance: United States of America
- Branch: United States Army
- Service years: 2013–2016
- Rank: First lieutenant

Undrafted after graduation, Rowley was invited by the Toronto Blue Jays to play for the Gulf Coast League Blue Jays for the remainder of the 2013 season, after which he would begin his five-year active duty obligation to the United States Army. In nine games played, he pitched to a 4–0 record, 1.10 ERA, and 39 strikeouts in 32 2/3 innings. Rowley began his military service assigned to Fort Sill, Oklahoma, and was later assigned to Bulgaria and Romania as a Field Artillery fire support officer. While assigned to Bulgaria for Operation Atlantic Resolve, first lieutenant Rowley pitched to his company's senior medic to keep his arm in shape. After serving 30 months in the military, Rowley's application for an exception to the remainder of his commitment was approved on January 22, 2016, and he was assigned to Individual Ready Reserve. He played the entire year with the Advanced-A Dunedin Blue Jays, and posted a 10–3 win–loss record, 3.49 ERA, and 86 strikeouts in a career-high 123 2/3 innings. He was assigned to the Double-A New Hampshire Fisher Cats to begin the 2017 season, and earned a promotion to the Triple-A Buffalo Bisons on June 19. Rowley initially pitched out of the bullpen for Buffalo, and joined the starting rotation on July 4.

=== Major Leagues ===
On August 12, 2017, Rowley was called up from Triple-A Buffalo to start against the Pittsburgh Pirates. He pitched 5 1/3 innings and allowed a single run on five hits and one walk with three strikeouts, and earned the win in the 7–2 victory. In his rookie season, Rowley recorded a 6.75 ERA and 1–2 record in 6 games. Rowley was outrighted off the 40-man roster on November 20, 2017. On January 24, 2018, the Blue Jays invited him to spring training as a non-roster invitee. He did not make the club and was assigned to Triple-A Buffalo to begin the year. Rowley was added to the active roster on July 14, 2018. In two games for Toronto in 2018, Rowley allowed three earned runs in 2/3 innings pitched.

=== Texas Rangers ===
On July 23, 2018, Rowley was claimed off waivers by the Texas Rangers. He spent the remainder of the season with the Triple-A Round Rock Express, logging a 2–3 record and 3.46 ERA in 7 games. On September 10, Rowley was outrighted off of the 40-man roster. He declared free agency on October 5, 2018.

=== San Diego Padres ===
On February 28, 2019, Rowley signed a minor league contract with the San Diego Padres organization. He was assigned to the Triple-A El Paso Chihuahuas, where he pitched to a 11.02 ERA in 16 1/3 innings of work, missing much of the year due to injury. Rowley elected free agency following the season on November 4.

=== Minnesota Twins ===
On January 28, 2020, Rowley signed a minor league contract with the Minnesota Twins organization. Rowley did not play in a game in 2020 due to a career-ending shoulder injury and the cancellation of the minor league season because of the COVID-19 pandemic. He became a free agent on November 2.

== Legal career ==
=== Law School ===
During the cancelled 2020 minor league season, during which minor league contracts were voided and players were not paid, Rowley grew frustrated with the labor conditions and lack of collective bargaining for minor league players. Rowley began work in the minor league grassroots labor movement with Advocates for Minor Leaguers, a nonprofit formed to help players attain a "collective voice," and subsequently enrolled in the University of Colorado Law School. While there, he was awarded the Michael Weiner Scholarship for Labor Studies.

=== Practice ===
Following graduation from law school, Rowley joined Philadelphia law firm Fox Rothschild in its Denver, Colorado office, where he practices transactional real estate, zoning & land use, and financial services.

=== Publications ===
Following minor league players' unionization in September 2022, Rowley authored a law review article on the labor relationship in Minor League Baseball; the article, titled "It’s Past Time: Unionization and Self-Determinism in Minor League Baseball," was published in Volume 95 of the University of Colorado Law Review in June 2024. The article both criticizes past labor practices by Major League Baseball and proposes a new way forward in the Minor League labor relationship.

In May 2024, Rowley published another article, titled "Creative Jurisprudence: The Paradox of Free Speech Absolutism" alongside Indiana University law professor R. George Wright. The article critically examines constitutional paradoxes created by the Supreme Court's "absolutist" stance on the First Amendment's right to free speech in 303 Creative LLC v. Elenis.
