= J. David Walker Field at Legacy Park =

Baseball park at Lehigh University

- Location within Pennsylvania J. David Walker Field at Legacy Park (the United States)
- Interactive map of J. David Walker Field at Legacy Park
- Former names: Legacy Park (2015–2016)
- Address: 123 Goodman Drive; Bethlehem, Pennsylvania; U.S.
- Location: Goodman Campus of Lehigh University
- Coordinates: 40.582524°N 75.357633°W
- Owner: Lehigh University
- Operator: Lehigh University
- Capacity: 370
- Field size: Left Field: 320 ft (98 m); Left Center: 375 ft (114 m); Center Field: 400 ft (120 m); Right Center: 375 ft (114 m); Right Field: 320 ft (98 m)
- Surface: Synthetic turf (infield); Natural grass (outfield)
- Scoreboard: Electronic

Construction
- Opened: April 2015
- Renovated: Fall 2017

Tenants
- Lehigh Mountain Hawks baseball (PL)

J. David Walker Field at Legacy Park is a baseball venue in Bethlehem, Pennsylvania, United States. It is home to the Lehigh Mountain Hawks baseball team of the NCAA Division I Patriot League. It features batting cages, bullpens, a natural grass surface, and an electronic scoreboard.

== See also ==
- List of NCAA Division I baseball venues
