= Eugene B. Depew Field =

Baseball park at Bucknell University

- Depew Field
- Interactive map of Eugene B. Depew Field
- Former names: Bucknell Field (1990–2002)
- Location: Bucknell West Drive, Lewisburg, Pennsylvania, USA
- Coordinates: 40.951709°N 76.891599°W
- Owner: Bucknell University
- Operator: Bucknell University
- Capacity: 500
- Surface: FieldTurf (2009–present)
- Scoreboard: Electronic
- Field size: Left Field: 330 feet (100 m); Left Center Field: 385 feet (117 m); Center Field: 400 feet (120 m); Right Center Field: 385 feet (117 m); Right Field: 330 feet (100 m)

Construction
- Built: 1990
- Renovated: 2009, 2010

Tenant
- Bucknell Bison baseball (NCAA D1 Patriot) (1990–present)

Eugene B. Depew Field is a baseball venue located on the campus of Bucknell University in Lewisburg, Pennsylvania, USA. It is home to the Bucknell University Bison college baseball team of the Division I Patriot League. The field has a seating capacity of 500 spectators and was built in 1990.

== Naming ==
On April 17, 2003, it was dedicated to Bucknell baseball coach Eugene Depew, a Bucknell alumnus (Class of 1971) and coach of the program from 1982–2012. Depew retired after the 2012 season as the longest serving coach of Bucknell baseball.

== Renovations ==
In 2009, a FieldTurf surface was installed at the field. Renovations continued in 2010, when a new backstop, dugouts, and fencing were installed.

== See also ==
- List of NCAA Division I baseball venues
