= Johnson Stadium at Doubleday Field =

Baseball stadium on the campus of West Point, NY

Doubleday Field
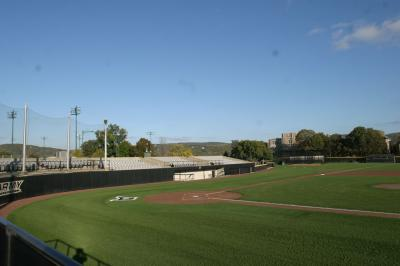
- The stadium as seen in 2009
- Interactive map of Doubleday Field
- Full name: Johnson Stadium at Doubleday Field
- Address: West Point, NY; United States
- Coordinates: 41.392796°N 73.954826°W
- Owner: United States Military Academy
- Operator: USMA Athletics
- Capacity: 880
- Type: Ballpark
- Surface: Natural grass
- Field size: Left field: 327 feet (100 m); Left center field: 370 feet (110 m); Center field: 400 feet (120 m); Right center field: 375 feet (114 m); Right field: 327 feet (100 m)
- Current use: Baseball

Construction
- Opened: 1939; 87 years ago
- Renovated: 1996, 2006
- Expanded: 2006

Tenants
- Army Black Knights baseball (NCAA DI PL) (1939–present); Patriot League baseball tournament Championship Series (2012)

Website
- goarmywestpoint.com/doubleday-field

Johnson Stadium at Doubleday Field is a baseball venue located on the campus of the United States Military Academy, in West Point, New York. It is the home of the Army Black Knights baseball team.

== History ==
Doubleday Field was named for Civil War Union Major General Abner Doubleday, a member of the West Point Class of 1842.

The field was dedicated in May 1939, which was celebrated by the American League and National League as the centennial year of baseball.

The field hosted the 2012 Patriot League baseball tournament Championship Series, in which Army defeated Holy Cross two games to one.

== 1996 renovation ==
After an extensive renovation, the new Johnson Stadium at Doubleday Field was formally dedicated on September 13, 1996. The project included new locker rooms, training rooms, clubhouse facilities, and 880 fixed chair-back seats.

== Cadets ==
Along the visitors bullpen there is usually a group of present and former cadets from the United States Military Academy, who are known to give opposing teams (and umpires) a hard time.

== Sights ==
Johnson Stadium is placed in the heart of West Point. Behind right field you can see the library and other buildings, and behind left field is Cullum Memorial Hall which sits directly across the road from Doubleday Field, where the New York Yankees occasionally played exhibition games in the 1920s.

In 2012, college baseball writer Eric Sorenson ranked the facility as the third best setting in Division I baseball.

== See also ==
- List of NCAA Division I baseball venues
