= Terwilliger Brothers Field at Max Bishop Stadium =

Baseball stadium on the campus of US Naval Academy

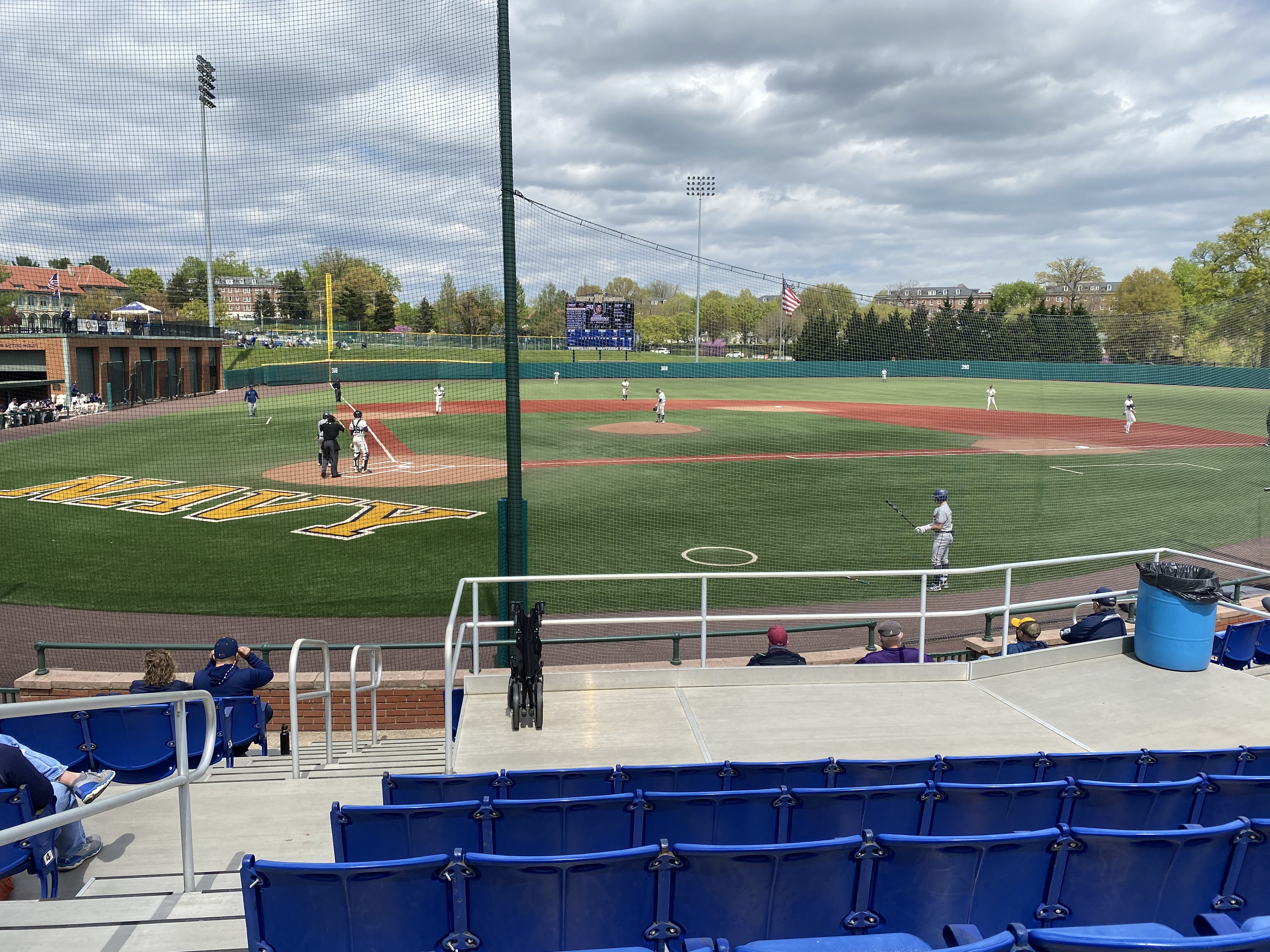

- Location within Maryland Location within the United States
- Interactive map of Terwilliger Brothers Field at Max Bishop Stadium
- Location: King George Street (east of Baltimore Boulevard) Annapolis, Maryland, U.S.
- Coordinates: 38.9864°N 76.495359°W
- Owner: United States Naval Academy
- Operator: United States Naval Academy
- Capacity: 1,500
- Surface: FieldTurf
- Scoreboard: Electronic
- Field size: Left field: 322 ft (98 m); Left center: 382 ft (116 m); Center field: 397 ft (121 m); Right center: 372 ft (113 m); Right field: 304 ft (93 m)

Construction
- Opened: 1946
- Renovated: 2005

Tenants
- Navy Midshipmen baseball (PL); Bowie Baysox (EL) 1994

Terwilliger Brothers Field at Max Bishop Stadium is a baseball venue in Annapolis, Maryland, United States. Opened in 1946, it is home to the Navy Midshipmen baseball team of the NCAA Division I Patriot League. This field has a capacity of 1,500 spectators. The stadium is named for Max Bishop, Navy head baseball coach from 1937 to 1961. In his tenure, the team's record was 306–143. The field is named for two Naval Academy alumni, Ron Terwilliger (class of 1963) and Bruce Terwilliger (class of 1964), both contributors to Navy athletics. The scoreboard at Navy–Marine Corps Memorial Stadium, Navy's football venue, is also named for the brothers.

The field features a full FieldTurf surface (with the exception of the pitcher's mound and the areas around home plate and the bases), which, at the time of construction, was only the third such full surface in college baseball. The venue also features an LED videoboard, restrooms, concessions, a patio area, and brick archways. In addition to hosting Navy baseball games, Max Bishop Stadium briefly played host to the Bowie Baysox in 1994, as delays in the construction of Prince George's Stadium forced them to play home games for three months at other venues in the region.

Starting in summer 2026, the stadium will receive $5 million in renovations "centered on player and team development" to be completed before the 2027 season. The renovations will include "a new team locker room, expanded athletic training room, wardroom [(player lounge)], nutrition center, expanded coaches' offices, two fan suites and a modern press box."

== See also ==
- List of NCAA Division I baseball venues
