= Bucknell Bison baseball =

College baseball team

Bucknell Bison
- 2026 Bucknell Bison baseball team
- Founded: 1886; 140 years ago
- University: Bucknell University
- Head coach: Scott Heather (14th season)
- Conference: Patriot League
- Location: Lewisburg, Pennsylvania
- Home stadium: Eugene B. Depew Field
- Nickname: Bison
- Colors: Blue and orange

NCAA tournament appearances
- 1996, 2001, 2003, 2008, 2010, 2014

Conference tournament champions
- 1996, 2001, 2003, 2008, 2010, 2014

Conference regular season champions
- 1996, 1999, 2001, 2003, 2006, 2009, 2014, 2026

The Bucknell Bison baseball team represents Bucknell University in NCAA Division I college baseball. The team participates in the Patriot League (PL), having joined as a founding member in 1991. Bucknell has played baseball since 1886. Prior to playing baseball in the Patriot League, they played in the Middle Atlantic Conferences (1965–1974) and the East Coast Conference (1975–1990). The Bison are currently led by head coach Scott Heather. The team plays its home games at Eugene B. Depew Field located on the university's campus.

== NCAA Tournament ==
Bucknell has participated in the NCAA Division I baseball tournament six times.

Year	Round	Opponent	Result
1996	Regionals	Florida; Central Florida	L 0–7; L 1–13
2001	Regionals	Miami; Stetson	L 6–14; L 0–7
2003	Regionals	Texas; Arkansas	L 0–7; L 7–10
2008	Regionals	Florida State; Tulane; Florida State	W 7–0; L 1–4; L 9–24
2010	Regionals	South Carolina; Virginia Tech	L 5–9; L 7–16
2014	Regionals	Virginia; Liberty; Arkansas	L 1–10; W 5–2; L 0–10

== List of head coaches ==
Cocah	Tenure	Record
Unknown	1886–1907	134–109–2
Paul G. Smith	1908	10–8
Unknown	1909	12–5
Byron W. Dickson	1910–1913	41–30–1
Frank Cruikshank	1914	12–8
George Cockill	1915–1917; 1921–1922	41–35–1
Haps Benfer	1919	2–5
Walter Blair	1920; 1926–1927	19–16–1
Moose McCormick	1923–1925	28–17–1
Carl Snavely	1928–1934	32–55
Edward Mylin	1935–1937	12–27–1
John Sitarsky	1938–1943	34–36
J. Ellwood Ludwig	1944	10–2
Russell E. Wright	1945	8–7
William H. Lane	1946–1957	91–88–2
Roger Oberlin	1958–1966	46–104–2
Tommy Thompson	1967–1981	109–201–2
Gene Depew	1982–2012	591–688–7
Scott Heather	2013–present	223–304–2

== Bison drafted by Major League Baseball ==
Bison in the Major League Baseball Draft
Round	Pick	Player	Position	Team	Year
72	970	Al Criswell	LHP	Reds	1967
42	762	Robert Zavorskas	SS	Reds	1967
5	112	Andy Nezelek	RHP	Braves	1986
11	344	Eric Junge	RHP	Dodgers	1999
15	447	Kevin McDowell	LHP	Tigers	2001
25	742	Kevin Miller	RHP	Pirates	2004
18	540	Kyle Walter	LHP	Blue Jays	2006
43	1280	Jason Buursma	RHP	Mariners	2007
25	755	Jason Buursma	RHP	Cardinals	2008
44	1313	Mark Angelo	LF	Mariners	2009
23	712	B.J. LaRosa	C	Dodgers	2010
35	1042	Danny Rafferty	LHP	Athletics	2016
8	247	Connor Van Hoose	RHP	Yankees	2018
