= Lehigh Mountain Hawks baseball =

College baseball team

Lehigh Mountain Hawks
- 2026 Lehigh Mountain Hawks baseball team
- Founded: 1885; 141 years ago
- University: Lehigh University
- Head coach: Sean Leary (31st season)
- Conference: Patriot League
- Location: Bethlehem, Pennsylvania
- Home stadium: J. David Walker Field at Legacy Park
- Nickname: Mountain Hawks
- Colors: Brown and white

NCAA tournament appearances
- 2006, 2015

Conference tournament champions
- 2006, 2015

Conference regular season champions
- 1984, 2002, 2006, 2021

The Lehigh Mountain Hawks baseball team represents Lehigh University in NCAA Division I college baseball. The team participates in the Patriot League (PL), having joined as a founding member in 1991. Lehigh has played baseball since 1885. From 1977 until 1990, the team was a member of the East Coast Conference. The Mountain Hawks are currently led by head coach Fran Troyan. The team plays its home games at Leadership Park located on the university's campus. On April 14, 2026, The Mountain Hawks set a couple of Division I and Patriot League records against the Coppin State Eagles by scoring 20 runs in the 1st inning along with 25 walks (Aidan Quinn alone had 7 walks), 12 hits and 9 HBPs with the final score being 38-6 in 8 innings.

== NCAA Tournament ==
Lehigh has participated in the NCAA Division I baseball tournament twice.

Year	Round	Opponent	Result
2006	Regional	Virginia; Evansville	L 11–5; L 10–6
2015	Regional	LSU; Tulane	L 10–3; L 15–3

== List of head coaches ==
Cocah	Tenure	Record
Captains/Managers	1885-1899	83-131-6
C.C. Carr	1900-1902	24-42
A.J. Mall	1903-1904	11-19
J.K. Lilley	1905	5-13
Dan Coogan	1906	4-12
Jim Garry	1907-1908	16-15
Byron W. Dickson	1909-1910	11-14
Ralph Caldwell	1911	4-7-1
Tom Keady	1912-1922	105-80-3
James A. Baldwin	1923-1925	26-17-1
Jing Johnson	1927-1928	13-30
Bob Adams	1929-1937	45-77
Paul R. Calvert	1938-1941	18-40
Elbert Caraway	1942-1952	82-101-1
Tony Packer	1953-1965	83-127-2
Ed Winchester	1966	4-11
Stan Schultz	1967-1994	326-388-6
Tom Morgan	1995	23-23
Sean Leary	1996-present	597-733-8

== Hawks drafted by Major League Baseball ==
Mountain Hawks in the Major League Baseball Draft
Year	Player	Round	Team
1971	Rich Revta	26th Round	Washington Senators
1973	Frank Zawatski	19th Round	San Francisco Giants
1975	Paul Hartzell	10th Round	California Angels
1977	Joe Carroll	20th Round	Texas Rangers
1989	Dave Norwood	40th Round	Cleveland Indians
1997	Ben Talbott	32nd Round	Anaheim Angels
2002	Jack Lyons	34th Round	Montreal Expos
2006	Matt McBride	2nd Round	Cleveland Indians
2010	Harris Fanaroff	50th Round	Washington Nationals
2015	Justin Pacchioli	10th Round	San Diego Padres
2015	Mike Garzillo	38th Round	New York Yankees
2016	Mike Garzillo	25th Round	Miami Marlins
2017	Mark Washington	25th Round	Los Angeles Dodgers
2019	Levi Stoudt	3rd Round	Seattle Mariners
2019	Jason Reynolds	32nd Round	San Diego Padres
2021	Mason Black	3rd Round	San Francisco Giants
2021	Matt Svanson	13th Round	Toronto Blue Jays
2022	Adam Retzbach	13th Round	Baltimore Orioles
2022	Carlos Torres	20th Round	Colorado Rockies
2024	Rafe Perich	7th Round	Texas Rangers
2024	Alex Bouchard	14th Round	Boston Red Sox
