= 2023 NCAA Division I baseball season =

2023 NCAA Division I season

- Duration: February 17 – June 26, 2023
- Number of teams: 300

Tournament
- Duration: June 2–26, 2023
- Most conference bids: SEC (10)

College World Series
- Champions: LSU (7th title)
- Runners-up: Florida (13th CWS Appearance)
- Winning coach: Jay Johnson (1st title)
- MOP: Paul Skenes, LSU

Seasons
- ← 2022 2024 →

The 2023 NCAA Division I baseball season was a college baseball season in the United States organized by the National Collegiate Athletic Association (NCAA) at the Division I level. It began on February 17, 2023, with play progressing through the regular season, various conference tournaments and championship series, and concluding with the 2023 NCAA Division I baseball tournament and 2023 Men's College World Series. The Men's College World Series, consisting of the eight remaining teams in the NCAA tournament and held annually in Omaha, Nebraska, at Charles Schwab Field Omaha, ended on June 26, 2023, with LSU winning the title.

== Realignment ==
A total of 22 baseball-sponsoring schools changed conferences after the 2022 season.

- The 2022 season proved to be the last for baseball in the Mid-Eastern Athletic Conference (MEAC) for the immediate future. On July 12, 2022, the Northeast Conference (NEC) and MEAC announced a partnership in which all MEAC members that sponsored baseball and men's and women's golf became NEC affiliates in those sports effective immediately. Accordingly, Coppin State, Delaware State, Maryland Eastern Shore, and Norfolk State became NEC baseball affiliates for the 2023 season and beyond.
- Austin Peay, Belmont, and Murray State left the Ohio Valley Conference. Peay joined the ASUN Conference, and Belmont and Murray State joined the Missouri Valley Conference (MVC).
- Bryant and Mount St. Mary's left the NEC, respectively for the America East Conference and Metro Atlantic Athletic Conference (MAAC).
- Dallas Baptist, a baseball-only member of the MVC, left for Conference USA (C-USA).
- Hartford, which began a transition to NCAA Division III in the 2021–22 school year, left the America East to become an independent for 2022–23 before joining the D-III Commonwealth Coast Conference in 2023.
- James Madison left the Colonial Athletic Association (CAA; since renamed Coastal Athletic Association) for the Sun Belt Conference (SBC).
- Lamar, which had announced it would leave the WAC to return to its former home of the Southland Conference (SLC) in 2023–24, expedited this move to 2022–23.
- Little Rock and UT Arlington left the SBC, respectively for the OVC and WAC.
- Marshall, Old Dominion, and Southern Miss left C-USA for the SBC.
- Monmouth left the MAAC for the CAA.
- North Carolina A&T left the Big South Conference after only one season for the CAA.
- Stony Brook left the America East for the CAA.
- UIC left the Horizon League for the MVC.

Incarnate Word had announced plans to leave the SLC for the WAC after the 2022 season, but days before that move was to take effect, the school announced it was staying in the SLC.

The 2023 season was the last for 15 baseball schools in their then-current conferences, as well as the aforementioned Hartford's only season as a D-I independent.

- BYU, Cincinnati, Houston, and UCF joined the Big 12 Conference. BYU left the West Coast Conference, and the others left the American Athletic Conference.
- Campbell left the Big South Conference for the CAA.
- Charlotte, Florida Atlantic, Rice, UAB, and UTSA left C-USA for The American.
- Jacksonville State, Liberty, New Mexico State, and Sam Houston joined C-USA. Jacksonville State and Liberty left the ASUN, and New Mexico State and Sam Houston the WAC.
- Western Illinois left the Summit League for the Ohio Valley Conference.

== Other changes from 2022 ==
Two Division I members adopted new names after the 2022 season. Neither school's nickname was affected.

- Dixie State University changed its forward-facing name to Utah Tech University in May 2022, ahead of the legal name change on July 1. The nickname remains Trailblazers.
- Houston Baptist University became Houston Christian University on September 21, 2022. The nickname remains Huskies.

== Other headlines ==
- On December 29, 2022, the Big West Conference announced it would add a postseason tournament effective as early as the 2025 season. The 2025 start date was confirmed by a vote of the conference chancellors and presidents on June 9, 2023.

== Season outlook ==
Collegiate Baseball News
Ranking	Team
1	LSU
2	Florida
3	Stanford
4	Texas A&M
5	Tennessee
6	Louisville
7	Arkansas
8	Miami (FL)
9	Vanderbilt
10	Wake Forest
11	North Carolina
12	Oklahoma State
13	UCLA
14	UC Santa Barbara
15	TCU
16	Virginia
17	Texas Tech
18	Southern Miss
19	Oregon
20	East Carolina
21	Maryland
22	Mississippi State
23	Georgia Tech
24	Ole Miss
25	Texas

== Conference standings ==
2023 America East Conference baseball standings
	Conf.						Overall
Team	W		L		T	PCT	W		L		T	PCT
Maine ‍†‍‡‍^{y}	19	–	5	–	0	.792	32	–	21	–	0	.604
UMBC ‍‍‍	16	–	8	–	0	.667	30	–	27	–	0	.526
Binghamton ‍‍‍	12	–	12	–	0	.500	29	–	23	–	0	.558
Bryant ‍‍‍	12	–	12	–	0	.500	26	–	24	–	0	.520
UMass Lowell ‍‍‍	11	–	13	–	0	.458	20	–	35	–	0	.364
NJIT ‍‍‍	11	–	13	–	0	.458	22	–	31	–	0	.415
Albany ‍‍‍	3	–	21	–	0	.125	9	–	34	–	1	.216
† – Conference champion ‡ – Tournament champion y – Invited to the NCAA tournament As of June 3rd, 2023; Rankings from D1Baseball

2023 American Athletic Conference baseball standings
	Conf.				Overall
Team	W		L	PCT	W		L	PCT
No. 24 East Carolina ‍†‍‍^{y}	18	–	6	.750	47	–	19	.712
Houston ‍‍‍	17	–	6	.739	36	–	23	.610
Wichita State ‍‍‍	13	–	10	.565	30	–	25	.545
UCF ‍‍‍	12	–	12	.500	33	–	26	.559
Cincinnati ‍‍‍	10	–	14	.417	24	–	33	.421
Memphis ‍‍‍	10	–	14	.417	29	–	28	.509
Tulane ‍‍‡‍^{y}	8	–	16	.333	19	–	42	.311
South Florida ‍‍‍	7	–	17	.292	21	–	39	.350
† – Conference champion ‡ – Tournament champion y – Invited to the NCAA tournament As of June 25, 2023; Rankings from D1Baseball

2023 Atlantic 10 Conference baseball standings
	Conf.						Overall
Team	W		L		T	PCT	W		L		T	PCT
Saint Joseph's ‍†‍‍	17	–	7	–	0	.708	28	–	24	–	1	.538
Davidson ‍‍‍	15	–	8	–	0	.652	30	–	24	–	0	.556
Saint Louis ‍‍‍	15	–	9	–	0	.625	33	–	23	–	0	.589
Dayton ‍‍‍	15	–	9	–	0	.625	26	–	34	–	0	.433
Richmond ‍‍‍	14	–	9	–	0	.609	27	–	28	–	0	.491
George Mason ‍‍‡‍^{y}	13	–	10	–	0	.565	36	–	27	–	0	.571
Rhode Island ‍‍‍	13	–	11	–	0	.542	23	–	29	–	0	.442
George Washington ‍‍‍	11	–	12	–	0	.478	21	–	34	–	0	.382
VCU ‍‍‍	11	–	13	–	0	.458	25	–	30	–	0	.455
Fordham ‍‍‍	7	–	17	–	0	.292	19	–	36	–	0	.345
UMass ‍‍‍	6	–	18	–	0	.250	14	–	35	–	0	.286
St. Bonaventure ‍‍‍	5	–	19	–	0	.208	8	–	40	–	0	.167
† – Conference champion ‡ – Tournament champion y – Invited to the NCAA tournament As of June 25, 2023; Rankings from D1Baseball

2023 Atlantic Coast Conference baseball standings
	Conf.				Overall
Team	W		L	PCT	W		L	PCT
Atlantic
No. 3 Wake Forest ^{x}‍‍‍^{y}	22	–	7	.759	54	–	12	.818
No. 18 Clemson ‍‍‡‍^{y}	20	–	10	.667	44	–	19	.698
Boston College ‍‍‍^{y}	16	–	14	.533	37	–	20	.649
Notre Dame ‍‍‍	15	–	15	.500	30	–	24	.556
NC State ‍‍‍^{y}	13	–	16	.448	36	–	21	.632
Louisville ‍‍‍	10	–	20	.333	31	–	24	.564
Florida State ‍‍‍	9	–	21	.300	23	–	31	.426
Coastal
No. 6 Virginia ^{x}‍‍‍^{y}	19	–	11	.633	50	–	13	.794
No. 20 Miami (FL) ‍‍‍^{y}	18	–	12	.600	42	–	21	.667
No. 15 Duke ‍‍‍^{y}	16	–	13	.552	39	–	23	.629
North Carolina ‍‍‍^{y}	14	–	14	.500	36	–	24	.600
Virginia Tech ‍‍‍	12	–	17	.414	30	–	23	.566
Georgia Tech ‍‍‍	12	–	18	.400	30	–	27	.526
Pittsburgh ‍‍‍	10	–	18	.357	24	–	31	.436
x – Division champion ‡ – Tournament champion y – Invited to the NCAA tournament As of June 25, 2023; Rankings from D1Baseball

2023 ASUN Conference baseball standings
	Conf.				Overall
Team	W		L	PCT	W		L	PCT
Lipscomb ‍†‍‡‍^{y}	23	–	7	.767	36	–	26	.581
Florida Gulf Coast ‍‍‍	20	–	10	.667	42	–	18	.700
Stetson ‍‍‍	20	–	10	.667	35	–	23	.603
Jacksonville State ‍‍‍	18	–	12	.600	27	–	30	.474
Jacksonville ‍‍‍	17	–	13	.567	34	–	24	.586
Liberty ‍‍‍	16	–	14	.533	27	–	31	.466
Eastern Kentucky ‍‍‍	15	–	15	.500	29	–	30	.492
Austin Peay ‍‍‍	15	–	15	.500	26	–	32	.448
Kennesaw State ‍‍‍	14	–	16	.467	25	–	29	.463
Central Arkansas ‍‍‍	14	–	16	.467	23	–	31	.426
North Florida ‍‍‍	13	–	17	.433	28	–	27	.509
Queens* ‍‍‍	9	–	21	.300	17	–	38	.309
North Alabama ‍‍‍	8	–	22	.267	14	–	37	.275
Bellarmine* ‍‍‍	8	–	22	.267	13	–	42	.236
† – Conference champion ‡ – Tournament champion y – Invited to the NCAA tournament * Ineligible for the 2023 NCAA tournament due to transition from Division II; As of June 25, 2023; Rankings from D1Baseball

2023 Big 12 Conference baseball standings
	Conf.				Overall
Team	W		L	PCT	W		L	PCT
No. 14 Texas ‍†‍‍^{y}	15	–	9	.625	42	–	22	.656
Oklahoma State ‍†‍‍^{y}	15	–	9	.625	41	–	20	.672
West Virginia ‍†‍‍^{y}	15	–	9	.625	40	–	20	.667
No. 5 TCU ‍‍‡‍^{y}	13	–	11	.542	44	–	24	.647
Kansas State ‍‍‍	13	–	11	.542	35	–	24	.593
Texas Tech ‍‍‍^{y}	12	–	12	.500	41	–	23	.641
Oklahoma ‍‍‍^{y}	11	–	13	.458	32	–	28	.533
Kansas ‍‍‍	8	–	16	.333	25	–	32	.439
Baylor ‍‍‍	6	–	18	.250	20	–	35	.364
† – Conference champion ‡ – Tournament champion y – Invited to the NCAA tournament As of June 25, 2023; Rankings from D1baseball

2023 Big East Conference baseball standings
	Conf.				Overall
Team	W		L	PCT	W		L	PCT
UConn ‍†‍‍	15	–	5	.750	40	–	13	.755
Xavier ‍‍‡‍^{y}	14	–	7	.667	34	–	22	.607
Seton Hall ‍‍‍	13	–	8	.619	31	–	22	.585
Georgetown ‍‍‍	10	–	10	.500	29	–	25	.537
Creighton ‍‍‍	10	–	11	.476	25	–	24	.510
St. John's ‍‍‍	8	–	12	.400	28	–	25	.528
Villanova ‍‍‍	7	–	13	.350	14	–	37	.275
Butler ‍‍‍	5	–	16	.238	12	–	43	.218
† – Conference champion ‡ – Tournament champion y – Invited to the NCAA tournament As of May 20, 2023; Rankings from D1Baseball

2023 Big South Conference baseball standings
	Conf.				Overall
Team	W		L	PCT	W		L	PCT
No. 22 Campbell ‍†‍‡‍^{y}	22	–	5	.815	41	–	13	.759
USC Upstate ‍‍‍	21	–	6	.778	36	–	20	.643
Gardner-Webb ‍‍‍	15	–	12	.556	31	–	23	.574
Winthrop ‍‍‍	15	–	12	.556	27	–	26	.509
Charleston Southern ‍‍‍	13	–	14	.481	22	–	28	.440
Presbyterian ‍‍‍	12	–	15	.444	21	–	34	.382
UNC Asheville ‍‍‍	12	–	15	.444	26	–	25	.510
High Point ‍‍‍	12	–	15	.444	20	–	34	.370
Longwood ‍‍‍	11	–	16	.407	23	–	31	.426
Radford ‍‍‍	2	–	25	.074	10	–	45	.182
† – Conference champion ‡ – Tournament champion y – Invited to the NCAA Tournament; As of May 20, 2023; Rankings from D1Baseball

2023 Big Ten Conference baseball standings
	Conf.						Overall
Team	W		L		T	PCT	W		L		T	PCT
Maryland ‍†‍‡‍^{y}	17	–	7	–	0	.708	42	–	19	–	0	.689
Indiana ‍‍‍^{y}	16	–	8	–	0	.667	41	–	18	–	0	.695
Iowa ‍‍‍^{y}	15	–	8	–	0	.652	43	–	14	–	0	.754
Nebraska ‍‍‍	15	–	9	–	0	.625	33	–	23	–	1	.588
Rutgers ‍‍‍	14	–	10	–	0	.583	33	–	23	–	0	.589
Michigan ‍‍‍	13	–	11	–	0	.542	28	–	28	–	0	.500
Michigan State ‍‍‍	12	–	12	–	0	.500	33	–	22	–	0	.600
Illinois ‍‍‍	12	–	12	–	0	.500	25	–	27	–	0	.481
Purdue ‍‍‍	11	–	13	–	0	.458	24	–	29	–	0	.453
Minnesota ‍‍‍	10	–	14	–	0	.417	18	–	34	–	0	.346
Ohio State ‍‍‍	9	–	15	–	0	.375	31	–	25	–	0	.554
Penn State ‍‍‍	7	–	16	–	0	.304	25	–	25	–	0	.500
Northwestern ‍‍‍	4	–	20	–	0	.167	10	–	40	–	0	.200
† – Conference champion ‡ – Tournament champion y – Invited to the NCAA tournament As of June 2, 2023; Rankings from D1Baseball

2023 Big West Conference baseball standings
	Conf.				Overall
Team	W		L	PCT	W		L	PCT
UC San Diego* ‍†‍‍	21	–	9	.700	34	–	18	.654
Cal State Northridge ‍‍‍	20	–	10	.667	34	–	17	.667
Cal State Fullerton ‍‍‍^{y}	20	–	10	.667	31	–	22	.585
UC Irvine ‍‍‍	19	–	11	.633	38	–	17	.691
UC Santa Barbara ‍‍‍	18	–	12	.600	35	–	20	.636
Hawai'i ‍‍‍	18	–	12	.600	29	–	20	.592
Long Beach State ‍‍‍	17	–	13	.567	33	–	22	.600
Cal Poly ‍‍‍	11	–	19	.367	21	–	35	.375
Cal State Bakersfield ‍‍‍	9	–	21	.300	18	–	34	.346
UC Davis ‍‍‍	7	–	23	.233	17	–	37	.315
UC Riverside ‍‍‍	5	–	25	.167	11	–	41	.212
† – Conference champion y – Invited to the NCAA tournament * Ineligible for the 2023 NCAA tournament due to transition from Division II; As of May 27, 2023; Rankings from D1Baseball

2023 Colonial Athletic Association baseball standings
	Conf.				Overall
Team	W		L	PCT	W		L	PCT
UNC Wilmington ‍†‍‡‍^{y}	20	–	8	.714	31	–	21	.596
Elon ‍‍‍	19	–	9	.679	32	–	20	.615
Northeastern ‍‍‍^{y}	20	–	10	.667	41	–	12	.774
Charleston ‍‍‍	18	–	12	.600	34	–	20	.630
Delaware ‍‍‍	17	–	13	.567	29	–	27	.518
William & Mary ‍‍‍	15	–	15	.500	32	–	23	.582
Stony Brook ‍‍‍	14	–	16	.467	23	–	29	.442
Hofstra ‍‍‍	13	–	15	.464	26	–	26	.500
North Carolina A&T ‍‍‍	11	–	17	.393	19	–	28	.404
Towson ‍‍‍	7	–	23	.233	19	–	37	.339
Monmouth ‍‍‍	6	–	22	.214	16	–	30	.348
† – Conference champion ‡ – Tournament champion y – Invited to the NCAA Tournament; As of May 20, 2023; Rankings from D1Baseball

2023 Conference USA baseball standings
	Conf.				Overall
Team	W		L	PCT	W		L	PCT
No. 25 Dallas Baptist ‍†‍‍^{y}	25	–	5	.833	44	–	13	.772
UTSA ‍‍‍	21	–	8	.724	38	–	19	.667
Charlotte ‍‍‡‍^{y}	17	–	12	.586	30	–	26	.536
Western Kentucky ‍‍‍	16	–	14	.533	32	–	25	.561
Florida Atlantic ‍‍‍	16	–	14	.533	34	–	24	.586
Louisiana Tech ‍‍‍	15	–	15	.500	28	–	30	.483
Middle Tennessee ‍‍‍	14	–	16	.467	27	–	27	.500
Rice ‍‍‍	9	–	21	.300	21	–	37	.362
FIU ‍‍‍	8	–	22	.267	21	–	34	.382
UAB ‍‍‍	8	–	22	.267	17	–	36	.321
† – Conference champion ‡ – Tournament champion y – Invited to the NCAA Tournament; As of May 21, 2023; Rankings from D1Baseball

2023 Horizon League baseball standings
	Conf.				Overall
Team	W		L	PCT	W		L	PCT
Wright State ‍†‍‡‍^{y}	22	–	8	.733	39	–	21	.650
Oakland ‍‍‍	18	–	12	.600	29	–	31	.483
Northern Kentucky ‍‍‍	17	–	13	.567	30	–	27	.526
Youngstown State ‍‍‍	13	–	16	.448	19	–	36	.345
Milwaukee ‍‍‍	11	–	18	.379	25	–	32	.439
Purdue Fort Wayne ‍‍‍	8	–	22	.267	13	–	43	.232
† – Conference champion ‡ – Tournament champion y – Invited to the NCAA Tournament; As of May 27, 2023; Rankings from D1Baseball

2023 Ivy League baseball standings
	Conf.				Overall
Team	W		L	PCT	W		L	PCT
Penn ‍†‍‡‍^{y}	16	–	5	.762	32	–	14	.696
Harvard ‍‍‍	15	–	6	.714	20	–	24	.455
Princeton ‍‍‍	13	–	8	.619	24	–	23	.511
Columbia ‍‍‍	11	–	10	.524	23	–	22	.511
Yale ‍‍‍	10	–	11	.476	17	–	23	.425
Brown ‍‍‍	9	–	12	.429	12	–	26	.316
Cornell ‍‍‍	8	–	13	.381	9	–	27	.250
Dartmouth ‍‍‍	2	–	19	.095	3	–	38	.073
† – Conference champion ‡ – Tournament champion y – Invited to the NCAA Tournament; As of May 27, 2023; Rankings from D1Baseball

2023 Metro Atlantic Athletic Conference baseball standings
	Conf.						Overall
Team	W		L		T	PCT	W		L		T	PCT
Fairfield ‍†‍‍	16	–	5	–	0	.762	38	–	18	–	0	.679
Rider ‍‍‡‍^{y}	14	–	7	–	0	.667	35	–	19	–	0	.648
Canisius ‍‍‍	16	–	8	–	0	.667	26	–	25	–	1	.510
Quinnipiac ‍‍‍	16	–	8	–	0	.667	30	–	26	–	0	.536
Niagara ‍‍‍	14	–	10	–	0	.583	24	–	22	–	1	.521
Manhattan ‍‍‍	13	–	11	–	0	.542	22	–	34	–	0	.393
Mount St. Mary's ‍‍‍	10	–	14	–	0	.417	25	–	27	–	0	.481
Marist ‍‍‍	10	–	14	–	0	.417	16	–	36	–	0	.308
Iona ‍‍‍	9	–	15	–	0	.375	13	–	38	–	0	.255
Siena ‍‍‍	7	–	17	–	0	.292	14	–	41	–	0	.255
Saint Peter's ‍‍‍	4	–	20	–	0	.167	9	–	41	–	0	.180
† – Conference champion ‡ – Tournament champion y – Invited to the NCAA Tournament; As of May 28, 2023; Rankings from D1Baseball

2023 Mid-American Conference baseball standings
	Conf.				Overall
Team	W		L	PCT	W		L	PCT
Kent State ‍†‍‍	24	–	6	.800	40	–	14	.741
Central Michigan ‍‍‍	19	–	11	.633	31	–	21	.596
Ball State ‍‍‡‍^{y}	19	–	11	.633	33	–	21	.611
Western Michigan ‍‍‍	18	–	11	.621	21	–	29	.420
Ohio ‍‍‍	15	–	15	.500	19	–	30	.388
Toledo ‍‍‍	14	–	16	.467	26	–	29	.473
Miami (OH) ‍‍‍	13	–	17	.433	21	–	35	.375
Bowling Green ‍‍‍	13	–	17	.433	20	–	30	.400
Eastern Michigan ‍‍‍	12	–	18	.400	27	–	26	.509
Akron ‍‍‍	12	–	18	.400	21	–	34	.382
Northern Illinois ‍‍‍	5	–	24	.172	10	–	43	.189
† – Conference champion ‡ – Tournament champion y – Invited to the NCAA Tournament; As of May 20, 2023; Rankings from D1Baseball

2023 Missouri Valley Conference baseball standings
	Conf.				Overall
Team	W		L	PCT	W		L	PCT
No. 11 Indiana State ‍†‍‡‍^{y}	24	–	3	.889	38	–	14	.731
Missouri State ‍‍‍	18	–	9	.667	31	–	21	.596
Southern Illinois ‍‍‍	15	–	12	.556	30	–	25	.545
Evansville ‍‍‍	15	–	12	.556	33	–	22	.600
Murray State ‍‍‍	14	–	13	.519	29	–	26	.527
UIC ‍‍‍	13	–	14	.481	27	–	23	.540
Valparaiso ‍‍‍	10	–	17	.370	20	–	25	.444
Belmont ‍‍‍	10	–	17	.370	25	–	31	.446
Illinois State ‍‍‍	9	–	18	.333	20	–	30	.400
Bradley ‍‍‍	7	–	20	.259	16	–	32	.333
† – Conference champion ‡ – Tournament champion y – Invited to the NCAA Tournament; As of May 20, 2023; Rankings from D1Baseball

2023 Mountain West Conference baseball standings
	Conf.				Overall
Team	W		L	PCT	W		L	PCT
San Jose State ‍†‍‡‍^{y}	18	–	11	.621	31	–	27	.534
San Diego State ‍†‍‍	18	–	11	.621	24	–	29	.453
Air Force ‍‍‍	17	–	13	.567	28	–	31	.475
Fresno State ‍‍‍	16	–	14	.533	30	–	27	.526
New Mexico ‍‍‍	13	–	17	.433	26	–	25	.510
UNLV ‍‍‍	12	–	18	.400	21	–	30	.412
Nevada ‍‍‍	10	–	20	.333	20	–	33	.377
† – Conference champion ‡ – Tournament champion y – Invited to the NCAA Tournament; As of June 19, 2023; Rankings from D1Baseball

2023 Northeast Conference baseball standings
	Conf.						Overall
Team	W		L		T	PCT	W		L		T	PCT
Central Connecticut ‍†‍‡‍^{y}	25	–	5	–	0	.833	32	–	11	–	0	.744
Wagner ‍‍‍	21	–	9	–	0	.700	30	–	22	–	0	.577
Fairleigh Dickinson ‍‍‍	20	–	10	–	0	.667	30	–	19	–	1	.610
Sacred Heart ‍‍‍	17	–	13	–	0	.567	25	–	28	–	0	.472
LIU ‍‍‍	16	–	14	–	0	.533	18	–	34	–	0	.346
Maryland Eastern Shore ‍‍‍	14	–	16	–	0	.467	18	–	35	–	0	.340
Coppin State ‍‍‍	14	–	16	–	0	.467	21	–	31	–	0	.404
Merrimack ‍‍‍	14	–	16	–	0	.467	21	–	30	–	0	.412
Stonehill ‍‍‍	10	–	20	–	0	.333	14	–	35	–	0	.286
Delaware State ‍‍‍	8	–	22	–	0	.267	13	–	35	–	0	.271
Norfolk State ‍‍‍	6	–	24	–	0	.200	9	–	42	–	0	.176
† – Conference champion ‡ – Tournament champion y – Invited to the NCAA Tournament; As of May 20, 2023; Rankings from D1Baseball

2023 Ohio Valley Conference baseball standings
	Conf.				Overall
Team	W		L	PCT	W		L	PCT
Morehead State ‍†‍‍	16	–	7	.696	34	–	19	.642
Little Rock ‍‍‍	14	–	8	.636	30	–	21	.588
Southeast Missouri State ‍‍‍	14	–	10	.583	23	–	19	.548
UT Martin ‍‍‍	14	–	10	.583	22	–	33	.400
Eastern Illinois ‍‍‡‍^{y}	13	–	11	.542	32	–	18	.640
Tennessee Tech ‍‍‍	10	–	14	.417	19	–	32	.373
SIU Edwardsville ‍‍‍	9	–	15	.375	26	–	27	.491
Southern Indiana* ‍‍‍	8	–	15	.348	17	–	37	.315
Lindenwood* ‍‍‍	8	–	16	.333	13	–	42	.236
† – Conference champion ‡ – Tournament champion y – Invited to the NCAA Tournament * Ineligible for the 2023 NCAA tournament due to transition from Division II; As of May 20, 2023; Rankings from D1Baseball

2023 Pac-12 Conference baseball standings
	Conf.						Overall
Team	W		L		T	PCT	W		L		T	PCT
No. 4 Stanford ‍†‍‍^{y}	23	–	7	–	0	.767	38	–	16	–	0	.704
No. 23 Oregon State ‍‍‍^{y}	18	–	12	–	0	.600	39	–	18	–	0	.684
Washington ‍‍‍^{y}	17	–	12	–	0	.586	35	–	18	–	0	.660
USC ‍‍‍	17	–	13	–	0	.567	34	–	23	–	1	.595
Arizona State ‍‍‍	16	–	13	–	0	.552	32	–	23	–	0	.582
No. 12 Oregon ‍‍‡‍^{y}	16	–	14	–	0	.533	38	–	20	–	0	.655
UCLA ‍‍‍	12	–	16	–	1	.431	28	–	24	–	1	.538
Arizona ‍‍‍^{y}	12	–	18	–	0	.400	33	–	24	–	0	.579
California ‍‍‍	12	–	18	–	0	.400	24	–	28	–	0	.462
Washington State ‍‍‍	10	–	19	–	0	.345	29	–	23	–	0	.558
Utah ‍‍‍	9	–	20	–	1	.317	22	–	32	–	1	.409
† – Conference champion ‡ – Tournament champion y – Invited to the NCAA Division I Baseball Championship; As of May 30, 2023; Rankings from D1Baseball

2023 Patriot League baseball standings
	Conf.						Overall
Team	W		L		T	PCT	W		L		T	PCT
Army ‍†‍‡‍^{y}	21	–	4	–	0	.840	37	–	16	–	0	.698
Navy ‍‍‍	14	–	11	–	0	.560	23	–	27	–	0	.460
Bucknell ‍‍‍	14	–	11	–	0	.560	23	–	22	–	1	.511
Lafayette ‍‍‍	10	–	15	–	0	.400	15	–	37	–	0	.288
Lehigh ‍‍‍	10	–	15	–	0	.400	24	–	36	–	0	.400
Holy Cross ‍‍‍	6	–	19	–	0	.240	16	–	35	–	0	.314
† – Conference champion ‡ – Tournament champion y – Invited to the NCAA Tournament; As of May 21, 2023; Rankings from D1Baseball

2023 Southeastern Conference baseball standings
	Conf.						Overall
Team	W		L		T	PCT	W		L		T	PCT
Eastern
No. 2 Florida ^{x}‍†‍‍^{y}	20	–	10	–	0	.667	54	–	17	–	0	.761
No. 19 Vanderbilt ‍‍‡‍^{y}	19	–	11	–	0	.633	42	–	20	–	0	.677
No. 13 South Carolina ‍‍‍^{y}	16	–	13	–	0	.552	42	–	21	–	0	.667
No. 7 Tennessee ‍‍‍^{y}	16	–	14	–	0	.533	44	–	22	–	0	.667
No. 17 Kentucky ‍‍‍^{y}	16	–	14	–	0	.533	40	–	21	–	0	.656
Georgia ‍‍‍	11	–	19	–	0	.367	29	–	27	–	0	.518
Missouri ‍‍‍	10	–	20	–	0	.333	30	–	24	–	0	.556
Western
No. 16 Arkansas ^{x}‍†‍‍^{y}	20	–	10	–	0	.667	43	–	18	–	0	.705
No. 1 LSU ‍‍‍^{y}	19	–	10	–	0	.655	54	–	17	–	0	.761
Auburn ‍‍‍^{y}	17	–	13	–	0	.567	34	–	23	–	1	.595
No. 10 Alabama ‍‍‍^{y}	16	–	14	–	0	.533	43	–	21	–	0	.672
Texas A&M ‍‍‍^{y}	14	–	16	–	0	.467	38	–	27	–	0	.585
Mississippi State ‍‍‍	9	–	21	–	0	.300	27	–	26	–	0	.509
Ole Miss ‍‍‍	6	–	24	–	0	.200	25	–	29	–	0	.463
x – Division champion † – Conference champion ‡ – Tournament champion y – Invited to the NCAA tournament As of June 26, 2023; Rankings from D1Baseball

2023 Southern Conference baseball standings
	Conf.				Overall
Team	W		L	PCT	W		L	PCT
Samford ‍†‍‡‍^{y}	15	–	6	.714	32	–	22	.593
Mercer ‍‍‍	13	–	8	.619	32	–	23	.582
Wofford ‍‍‍	12	–	9	.571	37	–	17	.685
East Tennessee State ‍‍‍	10	–	11	.476	25	–	27	.481
VMI ‍‍‍	9	–	11	.450	26	–	28	.481
UNC Greensboro ‍‍‍	9	–	12	.429	22	–	32	.407
Western Carolina ‍‍‍	8	–	12	.400	21	–	32	.396
The Citadel ‍‍‍	7	–	14	.333	22	–	29	.431
† – Conference champion ‡ – Tournament champion y – Invited to the NCAA tournament As of May 27, 2023; Rankings from D1Baseball

2023 Southland Conference baseball standings
	Conf.				Overall
Team	W		L	PCT	W		L	PCT
Nicholls ‍†‍‡‍^{y}	15	–	9	.625	34	–	24	.586
Incarnate Word ‍‍‍	14	–	10	.583	28	–	26	.519
New Orleans ‍‍‍	13	–	11	.542	36	–	24	.600
Lamar ‍‍‍	13	–	11	.542	32	–	23	.582
McNeese ‍‍‍	12	–	12	.500	35	–	23	.603
Northwestern State ‍‍‍	12	–	12	.500	29	–	27	.518
Texas A&M–Corpus Christi ‍‍‍	12	–	12	.500	24	–	30	.444
Southeastern Louisiana ‍‍‍	9	–	14	.391	25	–	25	.500
Houston Christian ‍‍‍	7	–	16	.304	11	–	37	.229
† – Conference champion ‡ – Tournament champion y – Invited to the NCAA Tournament; As of June 3, 2023; Rankings from D1Baseball

2023 Southwestern Athletic Conference baseball standings
	Conf.				Overall
Team	W		L	PCT	W		L	PCT
East
Alabama State ^{x}‍‍‍	26	–	4	.867	39	–	15	.722
Bethune–Cookman ‍‍‍	20	–	9	.690	29	–	25	.537
Florida A&M ‍‍‡‍^{y}	18	–	12	.600	24	–	27	.471
Jackson State ‍‍‍	13	–	17	.433	26	–	21	.553
Mississippi Valley State ‍‍‍	7	–	23	.233	15	–	37	.288
Alabama A&M ‍‍‍	5	–	24	.172	14	–	34	.292
West
Grambling State ^{x}‍‍‍	21	–	7	.750	27	–	24	.529
Texas Southern ‍‍‍	17	–	10	.630	31	–	20	.608
Southern ‍‍‍	17	–	10	.630	22	–	26	.458
Prairie View A&M ‍‍‍	14	–	15	.483	19	–	35	.352
Arkansas–Pine Bluff ‍‍‍	10	–	20	.333	18	–	33	.353
Alcorn State ‍‍‍	6	–	23	.207	9	–	39	.188
x – Division champion ‡ – Tournament champion y – Invited to the NCAA Tournament; As of May 20, 2023; Rankings from Collegiate Baseball

2023 Summit League baseball standings
	Conf.				Overall
Team	W		L	PCT	W		L	PCT
No. 8 Oral Roberts ‍†‍‡‍^{y}	23	–	1	.958	52	–	14	.788
North Dakota State ‍‍‍	16	–	7	.696	23	–	30	.434
South Dakota State ‍‍‍	13	–	11	.542	24	–	28	.462
Omaha ‍‍‍	9	–	14	.391	21	–	28	.429
Northern Colorado ‍‍‍	8	–	16	.333	11	–	34	.244
Western Illinois ‍‍‍	8	–	16	.333	12	–	40	.231
St. Thomas* ‍‍‍	6	–	18	.250	10	–	34	.227
† – Conference champion ‡ – Tournament champion y – Invited to the NCAA Tournament * Ineligible for the 2023 NCAA tournament due to transition from Division III; As of June 25, 2023; Rankings from D1Baseball

2023 Sun Belt Conference baseball standings
	Conf.				Overall
Team	W		L	PCT	W		L	PCT
No. 21 Coastal Carolina ‍†‍‍^{y}	23	–	7	.767	42	–	21	.667
No. 9 Southern Miss ‍‍‡‍^{y}	22	–	8	.733	46	–	20	.697
Troy ‍‍‍^{y}	18	–	12	.600	40	–	22	.645
Louisiana ‍‍‍^{y}	18	–	12	.600	41	–	24	.631
Texas State ‍‍‍	17	–	13	.567	36	–	23	.610
Appalachian State ‍‍‍	16	–	13	.552	30	–	25	.545
James Madison ‍‍‍	15	–	13	.536	31	–	25	.554
Georgia State ‍‍‍	16	–	14	.533	30	–	29	.508
Georgia Southern ‍‍‍	16	–	14	.533	27	–	29	.482
Old Dominion ‍‍‍	15	–	15	.500	32	–	23	.582
South Alabama ‍‍‍	11	–	19	.367	23	–	31	.426
Arkansas State ‍‍‍	9	–	19	.321	20	–	31	.392
Louisiana–Monroe ‍‍‍	6	–	23	.207	17	–	37	.315
Marshall ‍‍‍	5	–	25	.167	16	–	37	.302
† – Conference champion ‡ – Tournament champion y – Invited to the NCAA Tournament; As of June 25, 2023; Rankings from D1Baseball

2023 West Coast Conference baseball standings
	Conf.						Overall
Team	W		L		T	PCT	W		L		T	PCT
Loyola Marymount ‍†‍‍	21	–	6	–	0	.778	29	–	22	–	0	.569
Portland ‍‍‍	17	–	10	–	0	.630	29	–	21	–	0	.580
Santa Clara ‍‍‡‍^{y}	17	–	10	–	0	.630	31	–	18	–	0	.633
San Diego ‍‍‍	17	–	10	–	0	.630	24	–	23	–	1	.510
Saint Mary's ‍‍‍	14	–	13	–	0	.519	21	–	26	–	0	.447
Gonzaga ‍‍‍	14	–	13	–	0	.519	18	–	33	–	0	.353
BYU ‍‍‍	13	–	14	–	0	.481	24	–	28	–	0	.462
Pepperdine ‍‍‍	8	–	19	–	0	.296	19	–	30	–	0	.388
San Francisco ‍‍‍	8	–	19	–	0	.296	18	–	29	–	0	.383
Pacific ‍‍‍	6	–	21	–	0	.222	14	–	35	–	0	.286
† – Conference champion ‡ – Tournament champion y – Invited to the NCAA Tournament; As of May 20, 2023; Rankings from D1Baseball

2023 Western Athletic Conference baseball standings
	Conf.				Overall
Team	W		L	PCT	W		L	PCT
Grand Canyon ‍†‍‍	22	–	7	.759	36	–	19	.655
Sam Houston ‍‍‡‍^{y}	22	–	8	.733	33	–	22	.600
Utah Valley ‍‍‍	17	–	12	.586	31	–	22	.585
Seattle ‍‍‍	17	–	13	.567	21	–	30	.412
UT Arlington ‍‍‍	17	–	14	.548	26	–	27	.491
Abilene Christian ‍‍‍	16	–	14	.533	35	–	24	.593
UTRGV ‍‍‍	15	–	14	.517	23	–	16	.590
California Baptist ‍‍‍	15	–	15	.500	27	–	28	.491
Sacramento State ‍‍‍	14	–	16	.467	30	–	26	.536
Stephen F. Austin ‍‍‍	12	–	18	.400	22	–	28	.440
Tarleton* ‍‍‍	10	–	19	.345	26	–	26	.500
New Mexico State ‍‍‍	9	–	21	.300	14	–	37	.275
Utah Tech* ‍‍‍	8	–	23	.258	13	–	39	.250
† – Conference champion ‡ – Tournament champion y – Invited to the NCAA Tournament * Ineligible for the 2023 NCAA tournament due to transition from Division II; As of April 27, 2023; Rankings from D1Baseball

2023 NCAA Division I baseball independents standings
	Conf.				Overall
Team	W		L	PCT	W		L	PCT
Hartford ‍‍‍	0	–	0	–	4	–	33	.108
Rankings from D1Baseball

=== Conference winners and tournaments ===
Thirty athletic conferences each end their regular seasons with a single-elimination tournament or a double-elimination tournament. The teams in each conference that win their regular season title are given the number one seed in each tournament. The winners of these tournaments receive automatic invitations to the 2023 NCAA Division I baseball tournament.

Conference	Regular season winner	Conference Player of the Year	Conference Pitcher of the Year	Conference Coach of the Year	Conference tournament	Tournament venue (city)	Tournament winner
America East Conference	Maine	Jeremiah Jenkins, 1B, Maine	Luke Johnson, SP, UMBC	Nick Derba, Maine	2023 America East Conference baseball tournament	Bearcats Baseball Complex • Binghamton, NY	Maine
American Athletic Conference	East Carolina	Brock Rodden, 2B, Wichita State	Dalton Fowler, SP, Memphis	Loren Hibbs, Wichita State	2023 American Athletic Conference baseball tournament	BayCare Ballpark • Clearwater, FL	Tulane
ASUN Conference	Lipscomb	Edrick Felix, 2B, Florida Gulf Coast	Logan Van Treeck, SP, Lipscomb	Jeff Forehand, Lipscomb	2023 ASUN Conference baseball tournament	Melching Field at Conrad Park • DeLand, FL	Lipscomb
Atlantic 10 Conference	Saint Joseph's	Ryan Wilson, OF, Davidson	Chad Gartland, SP, George Mason	Fritz Hamburg, Saint Joseph's	2023 Atlantic 10 Conference baseball tournament	The Diamond • Richmond, VA	George Mason
Atlantic Coast Conference	Atlantic – Wake Forest (Note: Top seed in conference tournament.); Coastal – Virginia	Kyle Teel, C, Virginia	Rhett Lowder, SP, Wake Forest	Tom Walter, Wake Forest	2023 Atlantic Coast Conference baseball tournament	Durham Bulls Athletic Park • Durham, NC	Clemson
Big 12 Conference	Oklahoma State; Texas; West Virginia	JJ Weatherholt, 1B, West Virginia	Lucas Gordon, SP, Texas	Randy Mazey, West Virginia	2023 Big 12 Conference baseball tournament	Globe Life Field • Arlington, TX	TCU
Big East Conference	UConn	Dominic Freeberger, 3B, UConn	Jake Bloss, SP, Georgetown	Seton Hall (Rob Sheppard, head coach) (Note: The Big East's end-of-season coaching award is officially styled as the "Coaching Staff of the Year" award and is presented to the entire honored staff. The head coach is specifically named in the award announcement.)	2023 Big East Conference baseball tournament	Prasco Park • Mason, OH	Xavier
Big South Conference	Campbell	Lawson Harrill, OF, Campbell	Bobby Alcock, SP, Gardner–Webb	Justin Haire, Campbell	2023 Big South Conference baseball tournament	Truist Point • High Point, NC	Campbell
Big Ten Conference	Maryland	Matt Shaw, SS, Maryland	Connor O'Halloran, SP, Michigan	Rob Vaughn, Maryland	2023 Big Ten baseball tournament	Charles Schwab Field Omaha • Omaha, NE	Maryland
Big West Conference	Cal State Fullerton (Note: UC San Diego won the Big West regular season conference title, but was ineligible for the NCAA Tournament due to the team still transitioning from Division II.)	Caden Kendle, OF, UC Irvine & Jakob Simons, OF, CSUN (Note: The Big West styles its player award as "Field Player of the Year".)	Nico Zeglin, SP, Long Beach State	Eric Newman, UC San Diego	No tournament, regular season champion earns auto bid		
Colonial Athletic Association	UNC Wilmington	Ben Williamson, 3B, William & Mary	Ty Good, SP, Charleston	Mike Glavine, Northeastern	2023 Colonial Athletic Association baseball tournament	CofC Baseball Stadium at Patriots Point • Mount Pleasant, SC	UNC Wilmington
Conference USA	Dallas Baptist	Nolan Schanuel, 1B, Florida Atlantic	Simon Miller, RP, UTSA	Dan Heefner, Dallas Baptist	2023 Conference USA baseball tournament	Reckling Park • Houston, TX	Charlotte
Horizon League	Wright State	Noah Fisher, SS, Northern Kentucky	SP: Sebastian Gongora, Wright State; RP: Brandon Decker. Oakland (Note: The Horizon League's Pitcher of the Year award specifically honors starting pitchers. The conference presents a separate Relief Pitcher of the Year award.)	Alex Sogard, Wright State	2023 Horizon League baseball tournament	Nischwitz Stadium • Fairborn, OH	Wright State
Ivy League	Penn	Andy Blake, SS, Columbia	Ryan Dromboski, SP, Penn	John Yurkow, Penn	2023 Ivy League baseball tournament	Meiklejohn Stadium • Philadelphia, PA	Penn
Metro Atlantic Athletic Conference	Fairfield	Charlie Pagliarini, 3B, Fairfield	Matt Duffy, SP, Canisius	John Delaney, Quinnipiac	2023 Metro Atlantic Athletic Conference baseball tournament	Clover Stadium • Pomona, NY	Rider
Mid-American Conference	Kent State	Jeron Williams, SS, Toledo	Joe Whitman, SP, Kent State	Jeff Duncan, Kent State	2023 Mid-American Conference baseball tournament	Schoonover Stadium • Kent, OH	Ball State
Missouri Valley Conference	Indiana State	Spencer Nivens, OF, Missouri State	Connor Fenlong, SP, Indiana State	Mitch Hannahs, Indiana State	2023 Missouri Valley Conference baseball tournament	Bob Warn Field at Sycamore Stadium • Terre Haute, IN	Indiana State
Mountain West Conference	San Diego State; San Jose State	Sam Kulasingam, 1B, Air Force	TJ Fondtain, SP, San Diego State	Mark Martinez, San Diego State & Brad Sanfilippo, San Jose State	2023 Mountain West Conference baseball tournament	Pete Beiden Field at Bob Bennett Stadium • Fresno, CA	San Jose State
Northeast Conference	Central Connecticut	Sam Mongelli, SS, Sacred Heart	Dominic Niman, SP, Central Connecticut	Charlie Hickey, Central Connecticut	2023 Northeast Conference baseball tournament	Heritage Financial Park • Wappingers Falls, NY	Central Connecticut
Ohio Valley Conference	Morehead State	Ryley Preece, OF, Morehead State	Jackson Wells, SP, Little Rock	Mik Aoki, Morehead State	2023 Ohio Valley Conference baseball tournament	Rent One Park • Marion, IL	Eastern Illinois
Pac-12 Conference	Stanford	Alberto Rios, OF, Stanford	Quinn Matthews, SP, Stanford	David Esquer, Stanford	2023 Pac-12 Conference baseball tournament	Scottsdale Stadium • Scottsdale, AZ	Oregon
Patriot League	Army	Kevin Dubrule, SS, Army	Tanner Gresham, SP, Army	Chris Tracz, Army	2023 Patriot League baseball tournament	Campus Sites	Army
Southeastern Conference	East – Florida; West – Arkansas	Dylan Crews, OF, LSU	Paul Skenes, SP, LSU	Dave Van Horn, Arkansas	2023 Southeastern Conference baseball tournament	Hoover Metropolitan Stadium • Hoover, AL	Vanderbilt
Southern Conference	Samford	Ryan Galanie, 1B, Wofford	Jacob Cravey, SP, Samford	Tony David, Samford	2023 Southern Conference baseball tournament	Fluor Field at the West End • Greenville, SC	Samford
Southland Conference	Nicholls	Ryan Snell, C, Lamar	Grant Rogers, SP, McNeese	Mike Silva, Nicholls	2023 Southland Conference baseball tournament	Joe Miller Ballpark • Lake Charles, LA	Nicholls
Southwestern Athletic Conference	East - Alabama State; West - Grambling State (Note: This conference seeds its tournament on a divisional basis, with the division winners as top seeds on separate sides of the bracket.)	Daalen Adderley, SS, Texas Southern	Omar Melendez, SP, Alabama State	José Vázquez, Alabama State	2023 Southwestern Athletic Conference baseball tournament	Russ Chandler Stadium • Atlanta, GA	Florida A&M
Summit League	Oral Roberts	Jonah Cox, OF, Oral Roberts	Cade Denton, RP, Oral Roberts	Ryan Folmar, Oral Roberts	2023 Summit League baseball tournament	Newman Outdoor Field • Fargo, ND	Oral Roberts
Sun Belt Conference	Coastal Carolina	Shane Lewis, OF, Troy	Tanner Hall, SP, Southern Miss	Gary Gilmore, Coastal Carolina	2023 Sun Belt Conference baseball tournament	Montgomery Riverwalk Stadium • Montgomery, AL	Southern Miss
West Coast Conference	Loyola Marymount	Christian Almanza, 1B, Saint Mary's & Austin Deering, IF, BYU	Diego Barrera, SP, Loyola Marymount	Nathan Choate, Loyola Marymount	2023 West Coast Conference baseball tournament	Las Vegas Ballpark • Summerlin South, NV	Santa Clara
Western Athletic Conference	Grand Canyon	Grayson Tatrow, OF, Abilene Christian	Liam Rocha, SP, California Baptist	Gregg Wallis, Grand Canyon	2023 Western Athletic Conference baseball tournament	Hohokam Stadium • Mesa, AZ	Sam Houston

== Coaching changes ==
This table lists programs that changed head coaches at any point from the first day of the 2023 season until the day before the first day of the 2024 season.

Team	Former coach	Interim coach	New coach	Reason
Alabama	Brad Bohannon	Jason Jackson	Rob Vaughn	Fired
Boston College	Mike Gambino		Todd Interdonato	Became head coach at Penn State
Central Michigan	Jordan Bischel		Jake Sabol	Became head coach at Cincinnati
Cincinnati	Scott Googins		Jordan Bischel	Resigned
Eastern Michigan	Eric Roof		Robbie Britt	Fired
Georgia	Scott Stricklin		Wes Johnson	Fired
Jacksonville State	Jim Case		Steve Bieser	Retired
Long Beach State	Eric Valenzuela	Bryan Peters	T. J. Bruce	Valenzula became head coach at Saint Mary's; Peters not retained
Loyola Marymount	Nathan Choate		Donegal Fergus	Became head coach at Washington State
Maryland	Rob Vaughn		Matt Swope	Became head coach at Alabama
Maryland Eastern Shore	Brian Hollamon	Shawn Phillips	Danny Acosta	Unknown
Memphis	Kerrick Jackson		Matt Riser	Became head coach at Missouri
Miami (FL)	Gino DiMare		J.D. Arteaga	Resigned
Miami (OH)	Danny Hayden		Brian Smiley	Mutually agreed to part ways
Milwaukee	Scott Doffek		Shaun Wegner	Retired
Mississippi Valley State	Milton Barney Jr.		C. J. Bilbrey	Fired
Missouri	Steve Bieser		Kerrick Jackson	Fired/Became head coach at Jacksonville State
Morehead State	Mik Aoki		Brady Ward	Became head coach at Richmond
Navy	Paul Kostacopoulos		Chuck Ristano	Retired
New Mexico State	Mike Kirby	Keith Zuniga	Jake Angier	Fired
North Florida	Tim Parenton		Joe Mercadante	Resigned
Northern Illinois	Mike Kunigonis	Luke Stewart	Ryan Copeland	Contract not renewed
Northwestern State	Bobby Barbier		Chris Bertrand	Became head coach at Southeastern Louisiana
Northwestern	Jim Foster		Ben Greenspan	Fired
Penn State	Rob Cooper		Mike Gambino	Resigned
Queens	Ross Steadley		Jake Hendrick	Stepped down from position
Richmond	Tracy Woodson		Mik Aoki	Contract not renewed
Saint Mary's	Greg Moore		Eric Valenzuela	Fired
San Diego State	Mark Martinez		Shaun Cole	Retired
Siena	Tony Rossi	Joe Sheridan	Alex Jurczynski	Retired (effective March 20)
Southeastern Louisiana	Matt Riser		Bobby Barbier	Fired
Southern Miss	Scott Berry		Christian Ostrander	Retired (effective at season's end)
Tarleton	Aaron Meade	Wes Hunt	Fuller Smith	Removed from position
UCF	Greg Lovelady		Rich Wallace	Fired
UMass Lowell	Ken Harring		Nick Barese	Resigned
UNC Greensboro	Billy Godwin	Cody Ellis		Accepted scouting role with New York Yankees
Washington State	Brian Green		Nathan Choate	Became head coach at Wichita State
Wofford	Todd Interdonato		J.J. Edwards	Became head coach at Boston College

== See also ==
- 2023 NCAA Division I softball season
