= 2026 Boston College Eagles baseball team =

American college baseball season

2026 Boston College Eagles baseball
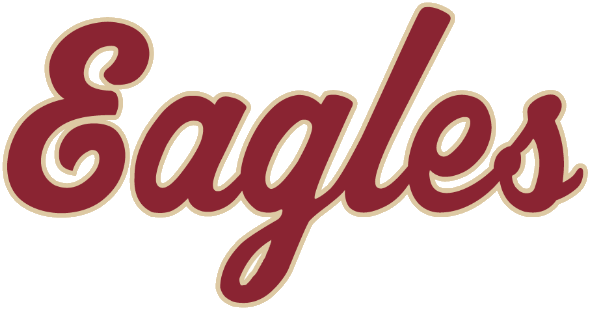

Baseball Beanpot champions

Athens Regional, 1–2
- Conference: Atlantic Coast Conference
- Record: 37–23 (17–13 ACC)
- Head coach: Todd Interdonato (3rd season)
- Assistant coaches: Jack Housinger (2nd season); John Creegan (1st season); Holden Wilder (1st season)
- Hitting coach: Greg Sullivan (13th season)
- Pitching coach: Ryan Forrest (1st season)
- Captains: Peter Schaefer; Sean Hard; Tyler Mudd
- Home stadium: Eddie Pellagrini Diamond

2026 Atlantic Coast Conference baseball standings
	Conf.						Overall
Team	W		L		T	PCT	W		L		T	PCT
No. 10 Georgia Tech ‍†‍‡‍^{y}	25	–	5	–	0	.833	50	–	11	–	0	.820
No. 2 North Carolina ‍‍‍^{y}	22	–	8	–	0	.733	54	–	14	–	1	.790
No. 18 Florida State ‍‍‍^{y}	19	–	11	–	0	.633	40	–	19	–	0	.678
Boston College ‍‍‍^{y}	17	–	13	–	0	.567	40	–	24	–	0	.625
Wake Forest ‍‍‍^{y}	16	–	14	–	0	.533	39	–	21	–	0	.650
Miami (FL) ‍‍‍^{y}	16	–	14	–	0	.533	39	–	20	–	0	.661
Virginia Tech ‍‍‍^{y}	15	–	15	–	0	.500	30	–	26	–	0	.536
Virginia ‍‍‍^{y}	14	–	16	–	0	.467	37	–	23	–	0	.617
NC State ‍‍‍^{y}	14	–	16	–	0	.467	32	–	24	–	0	.571
Louisville ‍‍‍	13	–	17	–	0	.433	30	–	27	–	0	.526
Notre Dame ‍‍‍	13	–	17	–	0	.433	31	–	22	–	0	.585
Stanford ‍‍‍	13	–	17	–	0	.433	28	–	26	–	0	.519
California ‍‍‍	12	–	18	–	0	.400	29	–	26	–	0	.527
Pittsburgh ‍‍‍	11	–	19	–	0	.367	33	–	24	–	0	.579
Clemson ‍‍‍	10	–	20	–	0	.333	31	–	26	–	0	.544
Duke ‍‍‍	10	–	20	–	0	.333	26	–	31	–	0	.456
† – Conference champion ‡ – Tournament champion y – Invited to the NCAA Tournament; As of June 23, 2026; Rankings from D1Baseball

The 2026 Boston College Eagles baseball team represented Boston College during the 2026 NCAA Division I baseball season. The Eagles played their home games at Eddie Pellagrini Diamond as a member of the Atlantic Coast Conference. They were led by third-year head coach Todd Interdonato.

== Previous season ==
The Hokies are coming off a 31–25 (12–18) season, where they went 1–1 in the 2025 Atlantic Coast Conference baseball tournament. The Hokies did not earn an at-large berth into the 2025 NCAA Division I baseball tournament.

== Preseason ==
=== Coaches poll ===
The coaches poll was released on January 29, 2026. Boston College was selected to finish last in the conference.

ACC coaches poll
Predicted finish	Team	Votes (1st place)
1	Georgia Tech	237 (7)
2	North Carolina	236 (6)
3	Florida State	221 (1)
4	Louisville	196
5	Clemson	185 (2)
6	NC State	169
7	Virginia	165
8	Miami	159
9	Wake Forest	145
10	Stanford	99
11	Virginia Tech	89
12	Notre Dame	87
13	Duke	67
14	Pittsburgh	45
15	California	41
16	Boston College	35

== Personnel ==
=== Starters ===
Lineup
Pos.	No.	Player.	Year
C	24	Cesar Gonzalez	Sophomore
1B	44	Nick Wang	Graduate
2B	2	Ty Mainolfi	Sophomore
3B	14	Luke Gallo	Freshman
SS	16	Julio Solier	Sophomore
LF	10	Colin Larson	Sophomore
CF	31	Carter Hendrickson	Graduate
RF	38	Jack Toomey	Senior
DH	55	Danny Surowiec	Sophomore

=== Pitching rotation ===
Weekend pitching rotation
Day	No.	Player.	Year
Friday	8	A.J. Colarusso	Senior
Saturday	23	Brady Miller	Sophomore
Sunday	21	Tyler Mudd	Graduate

=== Roster ===
2026 Boston College Eagles baseball team
Players
Coaches

#	Pos.	Name	B/T	Height	Weight	Year	Home town
1	INF	Sean Martinez	R/R	5 ft 11 in (1.8 m)	175 lb (79 kg)	So	Perkaise, PA
2	INF	Ty Mainolfi	L/R	6 ft 2 in (1.88 m)	185 lb (84 kg)	So	Staten Island, NY
4	OF	Charlie Comella	L/R	6 ft 1 in (1.85 m)	89 lb (40 kg)	So	Wellesley, MA
5	UTL	John Mass	S/R	5 ft 11 in (1.8 m)	195 lb (88 kg)	So	Portsmouth, RI
7	INF	Esteban Garcia	L/R	6 ft 2 in (1.88 m)	200 lb (91 kg)	Jr	Queens, NY
8	LHP	A.J. Colarusso	L/L	6 ft 0 in (1.83 m)	205 lb (93 kg)	Sr	Leominster, MA
9	OF	Gabe Malaret	S/R	6 ft 1 in (1.85 m)	190 lb (86 kg)	Fr	Boston, MA
10	OF	Colin Larson	L/L	5 ft 9 in (1.75 m)	185 lb (84 kg)	So	Easthampton, MA
11	C	Gunnar Johnson	R/R	6 ft 0 in (1.83 m)	200 lb (91 kg)	Gr	Newington, CT
12	INF	Owen DeShazo	R/R	6 ft 6 in (1.98 m)	230 lb (104 kg)	Sr	Glen Allen, VA
14	INF	Luke Gallo	R/R	5 ft 10 in (1.78 m)	185 lb (84 kg)	Fr	Shrewsbury, MA
15	UTL	Jace Roossien	S/R	6 ft 0 in (1.83 m)	185 lb (84 kg)	So	Nahant, MA
16	INF	Julio Solier	R/R	6 ft 0 in (1.83 m)	187 lb (85 kg)	So	Guayama, PR
17	RHP	Gavin Soares	R/R	6 ft 3 in (1.91 m)	220 lb (100 kg)	So	Ho-Ho-Kus, NJ
18	INF	Kyle Wolff	R/L	6 ft 1 in (1.85 m)	210 lb (95 kg)	Sr	Andover, MA
19	OF	Ben Williams	R/R	6 ft 0 in (1.83 m)	190 lb (86 kg)	So	Hanover, NH
21	LHP	Tyler Mudd	L/L	5 ft 9 in (1.75 m)	175 lb (79 kg)	Gr	Shrewsbury, MA
22	C	Easton Masse	R/R	5 ft 11 in (1.8 m)	190 lb (86 kg)	Fr	Manchester, CT
23	LHP	Brady Miller	R/L	6 ft 5 in (1.96 m)	210 lb (95 kg)	So	Harwich, MA
24	C	Cesar Gonzalez	R/R	5 ft 9 in (1.75 m)	185 lb (84 kg)	So	Maracaibo, VEN
25	RHP	Chase Hartsell	R/R	6 ft 2 in (1.88 m)	170 lb (77 kg)	Fr	Bridgewater, MA
26	LHP	Jacob Burnham	R/L	6 ft 0 in (1.83 m)	200 lb (91 kg)	So	Key West, FL
28	LHP	Zach Fronio	R/L	6 ft 4 in (1.93 m)	215 lb (98 kg)	Fr	Annandale, NJ
30	RHP	John Mitchell	L/R	6 ft 2 in (1.88 m)	182 lb (83 kg)	So	Spring, TX
31	OF	Carter Hendrickson	R/L/	5 ft 11 in (1.8 m)	190 lb (86 kg)	Gr	Farmington, MN
32	RHP	Sean Hard	R/R	6 ft 5 in (1.96 m)	210 lb (95 kg)	Gr	Mahwah, NJ
33	RHP	Logan Berenson	R/R	6 ft 3 in (1.91 m)	190 lb (86 kg)	Fr	Valley Village, CA
34	RHP	Luke D'Ancona	R/R	6 ft 3 in (1.91 m)	215 lb (98 kg)	Fr	Swarthmore, PA
35	RHP	Joe Gold	R/R	6 ft 0 in (1.83 m)	190 lb (86 kg)	Jr	Ballston Spa, NY
36	LHP	Sean Budis	L/L	6 ft 4 in (1.93 m)	200 lb (91 kg)	Fr	Kenilworth, NJ
37	LHP	John Kwiatkowski	L/L	6 ft 6 in (1.98 m)	245 lb (111 kg)	Sr	Floral Park, NY
38	OF	Jack Toomey	R/R	6 ft 3 in (1.91 m)	215 lb (98 kg)	Sr	Wellesley, MA
40	LHP	Aidan Gelbsman	L/L	5 ft 10 in (1.78 m)	185 lb (84 kg)	So	Oneonta, NY
43	RHP	Bobby Chicoine	R/R	6 ft 2 in (1.88 m)	225 lb (102 kg)	Sr	Armonk, NY
44	INF	Nick Wang	R/R	6 ft 1 in (1.85 m)	215 lb (98 kg)	Gr	Newton, MA
45	RHP	Drew Grumbles	R/R	6 ft 1 in (1.85 m)	190 lb (86 kg)	Jr	Maumelle, AR
46	RHP	Kyle Kipp	R/R	6 ft 2 in (1.88 m)	200 lb (91 kg)	Jr	Stamford, CT
47	LHP	Matthew Spada	L/L	6 ft 1 in (1.85 m)	200 lb (91 kg)	Sr	Westport, CT
49	RHP	Peter Schaefer	L/R	6 ft 0 in (1.83 m)	215 lb (98 kg)	Gr	Knoxville, TN
54	RHP	Ethan Marzo	R/R	6 ft 0 in (1.83 m)	200 lb (91 kg)	So	Middletown, NJ
55	INF	Danny Surowiec	L/R	6 ft 3 in (1.91 m)	225 lb (102 kg)	So	West Chester, PA

Head coach

- Todd Interdonato (UNC Asheville)

Assistant coach(es)

- Ryan Forrest (Maine)
- Jack Housinger (Xavier)
- Greg Sullivan (Fitchburg State)
- Nick Jaksa (UNC Asheville)
- Holden Wilder (Wofford)
- John Creegan (Northwestern)

Legend

- (C) Team captain
- (S) Suspended
- (I) Ineligible
- Injured
- Current redshirt

Roster
Last update: April 19, 2026

== Game log ==
2026 Boston College Eagles baseball game log (37–23)
Regular season: 36–20 (Home: 19–7; Away: 13–10; Neutral: 4–3)

February: 5–4 (Away: 1–1; Neutral: 4–3)
Date	Time	TV	Opponent	Rank	Stadium	Score	Win	Loss	Save	Attendance	Overall	SoCon
Puerto Rico Challenge
February 13	7:30 p.m.	Victory+	vs. Seton Hall*		Estadio Francisco Montaner; Ponce, PR	**W** 6–4	**Gonzalez** (1–0)	Barro (0–1)	**Soares** (1)	664	1–0	—
February 14	1:30 p.m.	Victory+	vs. Houston*		Estadio Francisco Montaner	**L** 1–5	Baker (1–0)	**D'Ancona** (0–1)	Tyler (1)	523	1–1	—
February 15	7:30 p.m.	Victory+	vs. Washington*		Estadio Francisco Montaner	**W** 10–0^{7}	**Mudd** (1–0)	Nichols (0–1)	None	406	2–1	—
February 20	4:00 p.m.		vs. Cornell*		Fifth Third Park; Spartanburg, SC	**W** 9–1	**Colarusso** (1–0)	Huxley (0–1)	None	340	3–1	—
February 21	4:00 p.m.		vs. Northwestern*		Fifth Third Park	**L** 4–5	Rifenburg (1–0)	**Kipp** (0–1)	None	377	3–2	—
February 22	10:00 a.m.		vs. Cornell*		Fifth Third Park	**W** 7–6	**Hartsell** (1–0)	Keller (0–1)	**Kwiatkowski** (1)	187	4–2	—
February 22	2:00 p.m.		vs. Northwestern*		Fifth Third Park	**L** 5–8	Fryer (1–0)	**Burnham** (0–1)	Dickson (1)	219	4–3	—
February 24	6:00 p.m.	ACCNX	Merrimack*		Eddie Pellagrini Diamond; Boston, MA	**Canceled (inclement weather)**						
February 27	6:30 p.m.	ESPN+	at Florida Gulf Coast*		Swanson Stadium; Fort Myers, FL	**W** 10–4	**Gonzalez** (2–0)	Rogers (1–1)	**Soares** (2)	391	5–3	—
February 28	5:00 p.m.	ESPN+	at Florida Gulf Coast*		Swanson Stadium	**L** 5–11	Diaz (1–0)	**Mudd** (1–1)	None	300	5–4	—

March: 16–5 (Home: 9–1; Away: 7–4)
Date	Time	TV	Opponent	Rank	Stadium	Score	Win	Loss	Save	Attendance	Overall	ACC
March 1	1:00 p.m.	ESPN+	at Florida Gulf Coast*		Swanson Stadium	**L** 3–4	Pocol (2–0)	**Hard** (0–1)	None	374	5–5	—
March 3	6:00 p.m.	ESPN+	at FIU*		FIU Baseball Stadium; Miami, FL	**W** 4–0	**Grumbles** (1–0)	Mlodzinski (1–1)	None	113	6–5	—
March 4	6:00 p.m.	ESPN+	at FIU*		FIU Baseball Stadium	**W** 9–4	**D'Ancona** (1–1)	Woodward (0–1)	None	104	7–5	—
March 6	7:00 p.m.	ACCNX	at No. 24 Miami (FL)		Alex Rodriguez Park; Coral Gables, FL	**W** 8–7	**Hard** (1–1)	Collera (1–1)	None	2,818	8–5	1–0
March 7	6:00 p.m.	ACCNX	at No. 24 Miami (FL)		Alex Rodriguez Park	**L** 3–5	Evans (3–1)	**Mudd** (1–2)	Bradley-Cooney (1)	2,876	8–6	1–1
March 8	1:00 p.m.	ACCNX	at No. 24 Miami (FL)		Alex Rodriguez Park	**W** 9–5	**Kwiatkowski** (1–0)	Durso (0–1)	**Kipp** (1)	2,894	9–6	2–1
March 10	3:05 p.m.	BEDN	at UConn*		Elliot Ballpark; Storrs, CT	**W** 26–19	**Hard** (2–1)	Aasland (1–2)	None	558	10–6	—
March 13	3:00 p.m.	ACCNX	at No. 10 NC State		Doak Field; Raleigh, NC	**L** 2–4	Marohn (3–0)	**Colarusso** (1–1)	Black (2)	2,361	10–7	2–2
March 14	2:00 p.m.	ACCNX	at No. 10 NC State		Doak Field	**W** 12–5	**Kwiatkowski** (2–0)	Black (2–1)	None	2,757	11–7	3–2
March 15	12:00 p.m.	ACCNX	at No. 10 NC State		Doak Field	**L** 1–5	Andrews (2–0)	**Burnham** (0–2)	Consiglio (1)	2,575	11–8	3–3
March 17	3:00 p.m.	ACCNX	Sacred Heart*		Eddie Pellagrini Diamond	**W** 5–4	**Mitchell** (1–0)	Emrich (0–1)	**Mudd** (1)	150	12–8	—
March 18	2:00 p.m.	ACCNX	UMass Lowell*		Eddie Pellagrini Diamond	**W** 12–2^{8}	**Burnham** (1–2)	DeMaro (1–3)	None	150	13–8	—
March 20	2:00 p.m.		California		Eddie Pellagrini Diamond	**W** 4–3	**Gonzalez** (3–0)	Clark (2–1)	None	152	14–8	4–3
March 21	1:00 p.m.		California		Eddie Pellagrini Diamond	**W** 9–6	**D'Ancona** (2–1)	Folley (2–2)	**Kipp** (2)	150	15–8	5–3
March 22	10:00 a.m.		California		Eddie Pellagrini Diamond	**W** 3–2	**Kwiatkowski** (3–0)	Colombara (0–1)	None	150	16–8	6–3
March 24	2:30 p.m.	FloSports	at Northeastern*		Friedman Diamond; Brookline, MA	**W** 3–2	**D'Ancona** (3–1)	Maher (2–1)	**Kipp** (3)	262	17–8	—
March 25	3:00 p.m.		Merrimack*		Eddie Pellagrini Diamond	**W** 12–2^{7}	**Hartsell** (2–0)	Nichols (1–1)	None	150	18–8	—
March 27	3:00 p.m.	ACCNX	No. 9 Virginia		Eddie Pellagrini Diamond	**W** 5–3	**Colarusso** (2–1)	Johnson (0–1)	**Gonzalez** (1)	400	19–8	7–3
March 28	2:00 p.m.	ACCNX	No. 9 Virginia		Eddie Pellagrini Diamond	**W** 17–0	**Mudd** (2–2)	Stammel (2–2)	None	1,128	20–8	8–3
March 29	1:00 p.m.	ACCNX	No. 9 Virginia		Eddie Pellagrini Diamond	**L** 1–3	Hartman (5–0)	**Soares** (0–1)	Kapa (6)	2,563	20–9	8–4
March 31	3:00 p.m.	ACCNX	Maine*	No. 22	Eddie Pellagrini Diamond	**W** 7–4	**Hard** (3–1)	Wheeler (0–4)	None	150	21–9	—

April: 14–3 (Home: 9–0; Away: 5–3)
Date	Time	TV	Opponent	Rank	Stadium	Score	Win	Loss	Save	Attendance	Overall	ACC
April 2	6:00 p.m.	ACCNX	at No. 6 North Carolina	No. 22	Boshamer Stadium; Chapel Hill, NC	**W** 6–1	**Colarusso** (3–1)	Lynch (2–3)	**Gonzalez** (2)	3,031	22–9	9–4
April 3	5:00 p.m.	ACCNX	at No. 6 North Carolina	No. 22	Boshamer Stadium	**L** 2–5	Glauber (3–0)	**Mudd** (2–3)	McDuffie (1)	3,381	22–10	9–5
April 4	12:00 p.m.	ACCNX	at No. 6 North Carolina	No. 22	Boshamer Stadium	**L** 7–8	Rose (2–0)	**Kipp** (0–2)	McDuffie (2)	3,259	22–11	9–6
The Baseball Beanpot
April 7	3:00 p.m.		UMass*	No. 23	Eddie Pellagrini Diamond	**W** 11–1^{8}	**Burnham** (2–2)	Lee (0–2)	None	101	23–11	—
April 8	3:00 p.m.	ACCNX	Dartmouth*	No. 23	Eddie Pellagrini Diamond	**W** 13–3	**Schaefer** (1–0)	Burke (1–3)	None	75	24–11	—
April 10	3:00 p.m.		Virginia Tech	No. 23	Eddie Pellagrini Diamond	**L** 8–9	Roe (3–1)	**Kipp** (0–3)	None	750	24–12	9–7
April 11	2:00 p.m.		Virginia Tech	No. 23	Fenway Park; Boston, MA	**W** 8–7	**Kwiatkowski** (4–0)	Grimm (0–3)	**Soares** (3)	3,213	25–12	10–7
April 12	1:00 p.m.		Virginia Tech	No. 23	Eddie Pellagrini Diamond	**W** 6–2	**Mudd** (3–3)	Stieg (2–2)	None	1,863	26–12	11–7
The Baseball Beanpot
April 14	6:00 p.m.		Northeastern*	No. 24	Eddie Pellagrini Diamond	**W** 3–1	**Kwiatkowski** (5–0)	Stieg (2–1)	**Kipp** (4)	1,828	27–12	—
April 15	3:00 p.m.	ACCNX	UConn*	No. 24	Eddie Pellagrini Diamond	**W** 8–5	**Kipp** (1–3)	Gilchrist (0–1)	**Mitchell** (1)	1,065	28–12	—
April 17	3:00 p.m.	ACCNX	Duke	No. 24	Eddie Pellagrini Diamond	**W** 11–1^{7}	**Colarusso** (4–1)	Weaver (4–5)	None	1,914	29–12	12–7
April 18 (DH 1)	1:00 p.m.	WEEI	Duke	No. 24	Eddie Pellagrini Diamond	**W** 4–2	Miller (1–0)	Lemke (1–4)	**Soares** (4)	2,216	30–12	13–7
April 18 (DH 2)	4:30 p.m.	ACCNX	Duke	No. 24	Eddie Pellagrini Diamond	**W** 14–6	**Kipp** (2–3)	Dean (6–1)	None	1,945	31–12	14–7
April 21	3:00 p.m.	ACCNX	Maine*	No. 22	Eddie Pellagrini Diamond	**L** 4–6	Wheeler (1–4)	**Gonzalez** (3–1)	Holt (3)	860	31–13	—
April 24	6:30 p.m.	ACCNX	at Notre Dame	No. 22	Frank Eck Stadium; South Bend, IN	**L** 2–12^{7}	Radel (5–3)	**Colarusso** (4–2)	None	811	31–14	14–8
April 25	2:00 p.m.	ACCNX	at Notre Dame	No. 22	Frank Eck Stadium	**W** 16–1^{8}	**Miller** (2–0)	Hirsch (2–4)	None	804	32–14	15–8
April 26	1:00 p.m.	ACCNX	at Notre Dame	No. 22	Frank Eck Stadium	**W** 7–6	**Soares** (1–1)	Jaisle (1–1)	None	845	33–14	16–8
April 28	6:00 p.m.	ESPN+	at UMass Lowell*	No. 20	Edward A. LeLacheur Park; Lowell, MA	**W** 7–6	**Hartsell** (3–0)	Doney (0–1)	**Hard** (1)	325	34–14	—

May: 2–6 (Home: 1–4; Away: 1–2; Neutral: 0–0)
Date	Time	TV	Opponent	Rank	Stadium	Score	Win	Loss	Save	Attendance	Overall	ACC
May 1	6:00 p.m.	ACCNX	at Clemson	No. 20	Doug Kingsmore Stadium; Clemson, SC	**W** 8–4	**Colarusso** (5–2)	Moehler (0–1)	None	4,743	35–14	17–8
May 2	1:00 p.m.	ACCN	at Clemson	No. 20	Doug Kingsmore Stadium	**L** 4–14^{7}	Sharman (6–1)	**Miller** (2–1)	None	4,527	35–15	17–9
May 3	12:00 p.m.	ACCNX	at Clemson	No. 20	Doug Kingsmore Stadium	**L** 3–4	Simmerson (1–1)	**Soares** (1–2)	None	4,334	35–16	17–10
May 10 (DH 1)	12:00 p.m.	ACCNX	NJIT	No. 22	Eddie Pellagrini Diamond	**L** 7–8	Riordan (3–6)	**Miller** (2–2)	None	568	35–17	—
May 10 (DH 2)	3:45 p.m.	ACCNX	NJIT	No. 22	Eddie Pellagrini Diamond	**W** 6–3	**Mudd** (4–3)	Peterson (2–3)	**Soares** (5)	732	36–17	—
May 12	4:00 p.m.	ACCNX	UMass Lowell*	No. 23	Gray–Minor Stadium	**Canceled**						
May 14	6:00 p.m.	ACCNX	No. 3 Georgia Tech	No. 23	Eddie Pellagrini Diamond	**L** 0–9	McKee (8–1)	**Colarusso** (5–3)	None	677	36–18	17–11
May 15	3:00 p.m.	ACCNX	No. 3 Georgia Tech	No. 23	Eddie Pellagrini Diamond	**L** 1–14	Ballard (6–0)	**Mudd** (4–4)	Patel (7)	1,642	36–19	17–12
May 16	1:00 p.m.	ACCN	No. 3 Georgia Tech	No. 23	Eddie Pellagrini Diamond	**L** 2–15	Blakely (7–1)	**Miller** (2–3)	None	2,828	36–20	17–13

Postseason: 1–3 (Home: 0–0; Away: 0–0; Neutral: 1–3)

ACC tournament: 0–1 (Home: 0–0; Away: 0–0; Neutral: 0–1)
Date	TV	Opponent	Rank	Stadium	Score	Win	Loss	Save	Attendance	Overall	ACCT Record
May 21	ACCN	vs. (5) Miami	(4)	Truist Field; Charlotte, NC	**L** 2–8	Collera (4–3)	**Colarusso** (5–4)	None	3,014	36–21	0–1

Athens Regional: 1–2 (Home: 0–0; Away: 0–0; Neutral: 1–2)
Date	TV	Opponent	Rank	Stadium	Score	Win	Loss	Save	Attendance	Overall	NCAAT Record
May 29	ESPN+	vs. (3) Liberty	(2)	Foley Field; Athens, GA	**L** 3–4	August (7–0)	**Soares** (1–3)	Harrington (14)	2,781	36–22	0–1
May 30	ESPN+	vs. (4) LIU	(2)	Foley Field	**W** 8–4	**Mudd** (5–4)	Decastro (7–3)	**Kipp** (5)	2,640	37–22	1–1
May 31	ESPN+	vs. (3) Liberty	(2)	Foley Field	**L** 3–8	Potts (4–2)	**Miller** (2–4)	None	2,867	37–23	1–2

Legend: = Win = Loss = Canceled
Bold = Boston College team member
Rankings are based on the team's current ranking in the D1Baseball poll.

Schedule Notes

== Rankings ==
Ranking movements Legend: ██ Increase in ranking ██ Decrease in ranking — = Not ranked RV = Received votes
	Week																	
Poll	Pre	1	2	3	4	5	6	7	8	9	10	11	12	13	14	15	16	Final
Coaches'	—	—*	—	—	—	—	RV	25	25	24	20	19	22	24	RV	RV	RV*	
Baseball America	—	—	—	—	—	—	—	21	23	22	17	14	21	—	—	—*	—*	
NCBWA†	—	—	—	—	—	RV	RV	25	25	25	22	21	25	25	RV	RV*	RV	
D1Baseball	—	—	—	—	—	—	—	22	23	24	22	20	22	23	—	—	—*	
Perfect Game	—	—	—	—	—	—	—	24	25	19	13	13	18	22	—	—*	—*	

† NCBWA ranks 30 teams in their preseason poll, but only ranks 25 teams weekly during the season.
* A new poll was not released for this week, so for comparison purposes, the previous week's ranking is inserted in this week's slot.
