= 2023 Ivy League baseball tournament =

- Teams: 4
- Format: Double elimination
- Finals site: Meiklejohn Stadium; Philadelphia, PA
- Champions: Penn (2nd title)
- Winning coach: John Yurkow (1st title)
- MVP: Jarrett Pokrovsky (Penn)
- Television: ESPN+

2023 Ivy League baseball standings
	Conf.				Overall
Team	W		L	PCT	W		L	PCT
Penn ‍†‍‡‍^{y}	16	–	5	.762	32	–	14	.696
Harvard ‍‍‍	15	–	6	.714	20	–	24	.455
Princeton ‍‍‍	13	–	8	.619	24	–	23	.511
Columbia ‍‍‍	11	–	10	.524	23	–	22	.511
Yale ‍‍‍	10	–	11	.476	17	–	23	.425
Brown ‍‍‍	9	–	12	.429	12	–	26	.316
Cornell ‍‍‍	8	–	13	.381	9	–	27	.250
Dartmouth ‍‍‍	2	–	19	.095	3	–	38	.073
† – Conference champion ‡ – Tournament champion y – Invited to the NCAA Tournament; As of May 27, 2023; Rankings from D1Baseball

The 2023 Ivy League baseball tournament was a postseason baseball tournament for the Ivy League in the 2023 NCAA Division I baseball season. The tournament took place from May 19–22, 2023 and was held at Meiklejohn Stadium from. After 28 previous Championship Series with two Ivy League teams competing to determine the automatic berth to the NCAA tournament, this was the first season in which the Ivy League would have a tournament to determine the postseason champion, with the best four teams in league play being matched against each other.

The regular season champion, Penn won all three games in the tournament and earned the automatic berth to the 2023 NCAA Division I baseball tournament. This was Penn's first Ivy League series/tournament title since 1995.

== Format ==
The top four teams in the Ivy League were seeded based on their records in league play. The tournament was a double elimination tournament played at the site of the regular season champion.

== Bracket ==
First Round
1	Penn	10
4	Columbia	6
Winner's bracket
2	Harvard	3
3	Princeton	2
4	Columbia	11
3	Princeton	13
Loser's bracket

Semifinal
1	Penn	10
2	Harvard	7
3	Princeton	10
2	Harvard	3

Final
1	Penn	16	-
3	Princeton	3	-

== Results ==
=== Game 1 ===
May 19, 2023 11:00 AM
Team	1	2	3	4	5	6	7	8	9	R	H	E
Princeton	0	0	0	0	0	0	2	0	0	2	5	2
Harvard	0	0	0	0	0	0	2	1	X	3	8	0
WP: Stovern (5–2) LP: Faulkner (2–3) Sv: Fang (5); Home runs: Princeton: Bandura; Harvard: None; Boxscore

=== Game 2 ===
May 19, 2023 3:00 PM
Team	1	2	3	4	5	6	7	8	9	R	H	E
Columbia	0	0	0	0	1	1	0	0	4	6	9	1
Penn	4	1	0	0	0	2	3	0	X	10	13	0
WP: Zeldin (2–1) LP: Sheets (3–4); Home runs: Columbia: Hage; Penn: Henseler; Boxscore

=== Game 3 ===
May 20, 2023 11:45 AM
Team	1	2	3	4	5	6	7	8	9	R	H	E
Columbia	3	1	1	0	0	0	1	5	0	11	11	3
Princeton	0	0	4	4	0	0	3	2	X	13	13	1
WP: Faulkner (3–3) LP: Palfrey (2–3) Sv: Rabin (1); Home runs: Columbia: Lazits; Princeton: Bandura, DiPietranton, Vinci; Notes: Columbia eliminated Boxscore

=== Game 4 ===
May 21, 2023 11:00 AM
Team	1	2	3	4	5	6	7	8	9	R	H	E
Harvard	0	0	1	1	2	3	0	0	0	7	8	4
Penn	3	0	0	0	6	0	1	0	X	10	15	1
WP: Trop (4–0) LP: Driver (3–3) Sv: Ozmer (6); Home runs: Harvard: Rounds; Penn: None; Boxscore

=== Game 5 ===
May 21, 2023 3:10 PM
Team	1	2	3	4	5	6	7	8	9	R	H	E
Harvard	1	1	1	0	0	0	0	0	0	3	7	0
Princeton	0	3	1	0	1	0	5	0	X	10	15	1
WP: Kim (7–2) LP: Matson (3–5); Home runs: Harvard: Berger; Princeton: DiPietranton, Cumming, Bandura; Notes: Harvard eliminated Boxscore

=== Game 6 ===
Ivy League Championship
(1) Penn Quakers	vs.	(3) Princeton Tigers

May 22, 2023 11:00 AM
Team	1	2	3	4	5	6	7	8	9	R	H	E
Penn	1	0	4	8	3	0	0	0	0	16	9	2
Princeton	0	0	0	0	2	0	0	0	1	3	9	1
WP: Zaffiro (5–2) LP: Chmielewski (6–6); Home runs: Penn: Pokrovsky, Baker; Princeton: Scannell; Notes: Penn wins Ivy League tournament Boxscore
