= Brian Murphy (baseball) =

American baseball coach, born 1980

Biographical details
- Born: September 23, 1980 (age 46)

Playing career
- 2000–2003: Merrimack
- Position: Catcher

Coaching career (HC unless noted)
- 2004–2005: Wheaton (MA) (asst.)
- 2006–2009: Bryant (asst.)
- 2010–2012: Brown (asst.)
- 2013: William & Mary (asst.)
- 2014–2021: William & Mary
- 2022–2026: Merrimack

Head coaching record
- Overall: 303–356–2
- Tournaments: CAA: 9–7; NEC: 3-2; NCAA: 2–2

Accomplishments and honors

Championships
- CAA regular season (2014); CAA tournament (2016)

Awards
- CAA Coach of the Year (2014); MAAC Coach of the Year (2026); VaSID Coach of the Year (2016)

Brian Murphy (born September 23, 1980) is an American baseball coach and former catcher, who is the current head baseball coach of the Merrimack Warriors. He played college baseball at Merrimack from 2000 to 2003. He then served as the head coach of the William & Mary Tribe (2014–2021)

== Playing career ==
Murphy was a catcher at Merrimack in North Andover, Massachusetts, where he served as captain in his senior season.

== Coaching career ==
He began his coaching career at Division III member Wheaton. He worked with the Lyons' catchers and served as hitting coach in his two seasons before moving to Bryant to work under Jamie Pinzino. Bryant was a member of Division II for his entire tenure with the Bulldogs, although the school began the reclassification process to Division I in his fourth and final season. Murphy served as recruiting coordinator and hitting coach, and worked with catchers and outfielders while at Bryant. In 2005 and 2006, Murphy served as hitting coach of the Hyannis Mets, a collegiate summer baseball team in the Cape Cod Baseball League. He next moved to nearby Brown, where he served three seasons and again served as recruiting coordinator and hitting coach. In his time in Providence, Murphy worked with ten All-Ivy League honorees.

In 2013, Murphy moved to William & Mary, where he served as the top assistant and hitting coach. After head coach Jamie Pinzino departed for Oklahoma, Murphy was elevated to his first head coaching position. Murphy finished with a 189–307 record at William & Mary, leading them to 4th NCAA tournament appearance in 2016. On September 16, 2021, Murphy resigned from his head coaching position at William & Mary.

On September 17, 2021, Murphy was named the head baseball coach at Merrimack.

== Head coaching record ==
The following is a table of Murphy's yearly records as an NCAA head coach.

Record table
| Season | Team | Overall | Conference | Standing | Postseason |
|---|---|---|---|---|---|
William & Mary Tribe (Colonial Athletic Association) (2014–2021)
| 2014 | William & Mary | 34–22 | 15–5 | 1st | CAA tournament |
| 2015 | William & Mary | 22–30 | 10–14 | 6th | CAA tournament |
| 2016 | William & Mary | 31–31 | 14–9 | 2nd | NCAA Regional |
| 2017 | William & Mary | 32–25 | 15–8 | 3rd | CAA tournament |
| 2018 | William & Mary | 15–39 | 3–21 | 9th | |
| 2019 | William & Mary | 33–22 | 12–12 | T-3rd | CAA tournament |
| 2020 | William & Mary | 8–9 | 0–0 | | Season canceled due to COVID-19 |
| 2021 | William & Mary | 14–29 | 10–14 | 4th (South) | CAA tournament |
| William & Mary: | | 189–207 | 79–83 | | |
Merrimack Warriors (Northeast Conference) (2022–2024)
| 2022 | Merrimack | 17–31–1 | 12–15 | 5th | |
| 2023 | Merrimack | 21–30 | 14–16 | T-6th | |
| 2024 | Merrimack | 33–26 | 22–11 | 3rd | Northeast tournament Semifinal |
| Merrimack: | | | 48–42 | | |
Merrimack Warriors (Metro Atlantic Athletic Conference) (2025–2026)
| 2025 | Merrimack | 16–33–1 | 11–18 | 11th | |
| 2026 | Merrimack | 27–29 | 20–10 | T–2nd | |
| Merrimack: | | 114–149–2 | 38–47 | | |
| Total: | | 303–356–2 | | | |
National champion Postseason invitational champion Conference regular season champion Conference regular season and conference tournament champion Division regular season champion Division regular season and conference tournament champion Conference tournament champion
