= Gene Roof =

American baseball player (born 1958)

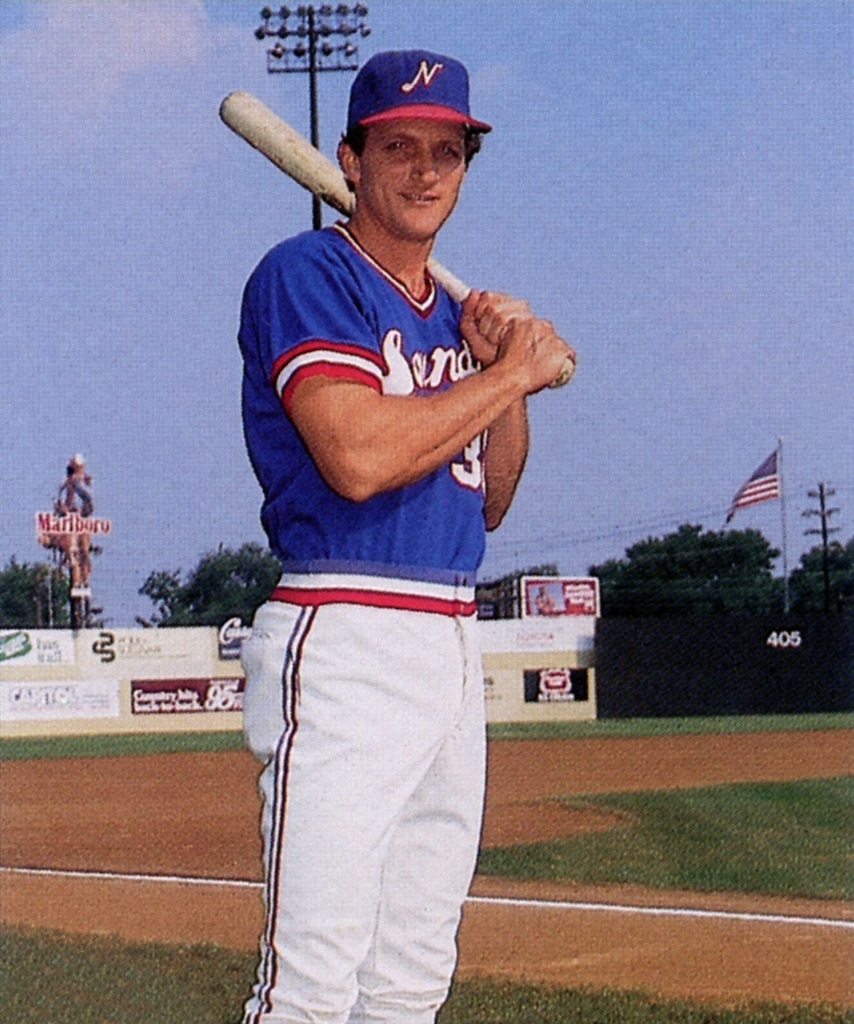
- Roof with the Nashville Sounds in 1986
- Outfielder
- Born: January 13, 1958 (age 68); Paducah, Kentucky, U.S.
- Batted: Switch Threw: Right

MLB debut
- September 3, 1981, for the St. Louis Cardinals

Last MLB appearance
- October 2, 1983, for the Montreal Expos

MLB statistics
- Batting average: .267
- Runs: 17
- Hits: 24
- Stats at Baseball Reference

Teams
- As player: St. Louis Cardinals (1981–1983); Montreal Expos (1983); As coach: Detroit Tigers (1992–1995)

Eugene Lawrence Roof (born January 13, 1958) is an American former Major League Baseball outfielder. He played during three seasons at the Major League level for the St. Louis Cardinals and Montreal Expos.

== Playing career ==
He was drafted by the Cardinals in the 12th round of the 1976 amateur draft. Roof played his first professional season with their Rookie league Gulf Coast Cardinals and Johnson City Cardinals in 1976, and his last with the Detroit Tigers' Triple-A Toledo Mud Hens in 1987. He is the brother of Phil Roof and cousin of Eddie Haas. His brothers Adrian, Paul, and David Roof played in the minor leagues.

== Coaching career ==
Since his retirement as a player in 1988, Roof has been a part of the Tigers organization as coach. He served as manager with Fayetteville Generals in 1989, London Tigers in 1991, Toledo Mud Hens from 1997 to 1999, and the Jacksonville Suns in 2000. He had also served as first base coach under Tigers manager Sparky Anderson from 1992 to 1995. Roof served as the Tigers minor league-wide outfield and base-running coordinator from 2001 until his retirement after the 2020 season.

== Personal life ==
All three of Roof's sons have played professionally. Shawn and Eric were minor leaguers in the Tigers organization, while the youngest, Jonathan, was drafted by the Rangers in 2010. Shawn Roof became a Minor League Baseball manager. Eric Roof became a college baseball coach.
