= 2023 The Citadel Bulldogs baseball team =

American college baseball season

2023 The Citadel Bulldogs baseball
- Conference: Southern Conference
- Record: 22–29 (7–14 SoCon)
- Head coach: Tony Skole (6th season)
- Hitting coach: Zach Lucas (4th season)
- Pitching coach: Blake Cooper (6th season)
- Home stadium: Joseph P. Riley Jr. Park

2023 Southern Conference baseball standings
	Conf.				Overall
Team	W		L	PCT	W		L	PCT
Samford ‍†‍‡‍^{y}	15	–	6	.714	32	–	22	.593
Mercer ‍‍‍	13	–	8	.619	32	–	23	.582
Wofford ‍‍‍	12	–	9	.571	37	–	17	.685
East Tennessee State ‍‍‍	10	–	11	.476	25	–	27	.481
VMI ‍‍‍	9	–	11	.450	26	–	28	.481
UNC Greensboro ‍‍‍	9	–	12	.429	22	–	32	.407
Western Carolina ‍‍‍	8	–	12	.400	21	–	32	.396
The Citadel ‍‍‍	7	–	14	.333	22	–	29	.431
† – Conference champion ‡ – Tournament champion y – Invited to the NCAA tournament As of May 27, 2023; Rankings from D1Baseball

2023 The Citadel Bulldogs baseball team represented The Citadel in the 2023 NCAA Division I baseball season. The Bulldogs played their home games at Joseph P. Riley Jr. Park in Charleston, South Carolina. The team were coached by Tony Skole, in his 6th season at The Citadel.

The Citadel recorded an overall record of 22–29, and finished in 8th place with a record of 7–14 in the Southern Conference.

== Previous season ==
The Bulldogs finished 26–31 overall, and 5–16 in the Southern Conference in 2022. They were 17–7 on March 29.

== Personnel ==
=== Roster ===
2023 The Citadel Bulldogs baseball roster
Pitchers: 4 - Will Bastian - Graduate Student; 9 - Ben Hutchins - Junior; 12 - Sam Swygert - Junior; 13 - George Derrick Floyd - Sophomore; 15 - Cameron Reeves - Graduate Student; 17 - Fisher Paulsen - Sophomore; 19 - Tyler Jones - Graduate Student; 23 - Will Holmes - Sophomore; 24 - Gant Starling - Senior; 28 - Aryan Patel - Freshman; 30 - Luke Kissenberth - Junior; 31 - Caleb Speedy - Senior; 33 - CJ Van Slooten - Freshman; 35 - Ethan Fewell - Junior; 36 - Brandon Gielow - Junior; 37 - Simon Graf - Senior; 38 - Conner Cummiskey - Junior; 39 - Chace Cooper - Senior; 42 - Matthew Polk - Sophomore; 44 - Yates Bland - Freshman	Catchers: 14 - Travis Lott - Senior; 21 - Phillips Daniels - Freshman; 34 - Calder Garris - Freshman; 40 - Gray Sobel - Junior; Infielders: 1 - Dylan Costa - Graduate Student; 2 - Thomas Rollauer - Sophomore; 5 - Sawyer Reeves - Junior; 6 - Anthony Badala - Senior; 8 - Garrett Dill - Sophomore; 10 - Crosby Jones - Senior; 20 - Travis Elliott - Junior; 32 - Noah Mitchell - Senior	Outfielders: 0 - Wells Sykes - Sophomore; 18 - Matthew Lively - Freshman; 22 - Chase Loggins - Sophomore; 29 - Clay Wilson - Senior; Utility: 3 - Luke Montenery - Senior; 25 - Antonio Colon - Junior; 50 - Billy Holmes - Freshman

=== Coaches ===
2023 The Citadel Bulldogs baseball coaching staff
- Tony Skole – Head coach – 6th year
- Zach Lucas – Assistant coach (hitting/recruiting) – 4th year
- Blake Cooper – Assistant coach (pitching) – 6th year
