= Todd Interdonato =

American college baseball coach

Current position
- Title: Head coach
- Team: Boston College
- Conference: ACC
- Record: 86–83 (.509)

Biographical details
- Born: 1978 or 1979 (age 46–47)

Playing career
- 1997–1998: South Mountain CC
- 1999–2000: UNC Asheville
- 2001: Evansville Otters
- Position: 1B / OF / P

Coaching career (HC unless noted)
- 2002: UNC Asheville (asst.)
- 2003–2004: Gardner–Webb (asst.)
- 2005: Fort Scott CC (asst.)
- 2006–2007: Wofford (asst.)
- 2008–2023: Wofford
- 2024–present: Boston College

Head coaching record
- Overall: 541–504–1 (.518)
- Tournaments: NCAA: 1–3

Accomplishments and honors

Championships
- SoCon Regular Season (2021, 2022)

Awards
- SoCon Coach of the Year (2021, 2022)

Records
- All-time wins at Wofford College

Todd Interdonato (born 1978 or 1979) is an American college baseball coach and former first baseman, outfielder and pitcher. Interdonato is currently the head baseball coach at Boston College. He played college baseball at South Mountain Community College from 1997 to 1998 before transferring to University of North Carolina at Asheville from 1999 to 2000 for coach Mike Roberts before playing professionally in 2001 for the Evansville Otters of the Frontier League. Interdonato and his wife, Melissa, were married in July 2012.

== Playing career ==
Interdonato spent two years at South Mountain Community College in Phoenix, Arizona before accepting a scholarship to continue his playing career at UNC Asheville Bulldogs baseball in 1998. He spent two years, the 1999 and 2000 spring seasons, playing for the Bulldogs.

== Coaching career ==
Interdonato was promoted to head coach of the Wofford program on June 27, 2007 after serving as an assistant for two seasons. After running the program at Wofford College for 17 seasons, he was named Boston College's ninth Head Coach in program history on July 13, 2023.

On May 3, 2025 — during Interdonato's second season at Boston College — the Eagles captured a 6-2 victory over Stanford, and this win marked the 500th of Interdonato's head coaching career between Wofford and Boston College.

== Head coaching record ==
Record table
Season	Team	Overall	Conference	Standing	Postseason
Wofford Terriers (Southern Conference) (2008–2023)
2008	Wofford	24–35	6–21	9th	SoCon tournament
2009	Wofford	17–32	7–22	11th	
2010	Wofford	17–38	9–21	9th	
2011	Wofford	22–33	9–21	9th	
2012	Wofford	22–32	9–21	10th	
2013	Wofford	20–36	10–20	11th	
2014	Wofford	32–28	12–14	6th	SoCon tournament
2015	Wofford	39–22	13–10	3rd	SoCon tournament
2016	Wofford	30–28	12–12	7th	SoCon tournament
2017	Wofford	28–30	13–11	5th	SoCon tournament
2018	Wofford	36–23	15–9	3rd	SoCon tournament
2019	Wofford	36–25	14–9	2nd	SoCon tournament
2020	Wofford	14–3	0–0		Season canceled due to COVID-19
2021	Wofford	36–21	21–9	1st	SoCon tournament
2022	Wofford	42–16–1	16–4–1	1st	SoCon tournament
2023	Wofford	40–19	12–9	3rd	SoCon tournament
Wofford:		455–421–1	178–213–1		
Boston College Eagles (Atlantic Coast Conference) (2024–present)
2024	Boston College	22–31	8–22	7th (Atlantic)	
2025	Boston College	27–29	11–19	T−13th	ACC Tournament
2026	Boston College	37–23	17–13	4th	NCAA Regional
Boston College:		86–83 (.509)	36–54 (.400)		
Total:		541–504–1 (.518)			
National champion Postseason invitational champion Conference regular season champion Conference regular season and conference tournament champion Division regular season champion Division regular season and conference tournament champion Conference tournament champion

== See also ==
- List of current NCAA Division I baseball coaches
