= 2023 Southern Conference baseball season =

- League: Southern Conference
- Sport: Baseball
- Teams: 8

Regular Season
- Season champions: Samford
- Season MVP: Ryan Galanie (Wofford)

Tournament
- Champions: Samford
- Runners-up: Wofford
- Finals MVP: Heath Clevenger (Samford)

Seasons
- ← 2022 2024 →

2023 Southern Conference baseball standings
	Conf.				Overall
Team	W		L	PCT	W		L	PCT
Samford ‍†‍‡‍^{y}	15	–	6	.714	32	–	22	.593
Mercer ‍‍‍	13	–	8	.619	32	–	23	.582
Wofford ‍‍‍	12	–	9	.571	37	–	17	.685
East Tennessee State ‍‍‍	10	–	11	.476	25	–	27	.481
VMI ‍‍‍	9	–	11	.450	26	–	28	.481
UNC Greensboro ‍‍‍	9	–	12	.429	22	–	32	.407
Western Carolina ‍‍‍	8	–	12	.400	21	–	32	.396
The Citadel ‍‍‍	7	–	14	.333	22	–	29	.431
† – Conference champion ‡ – Tournament champion y – Invited to the NCAA tournament As of May 27, 2023; Rankings from D1Baseball

The 2023 Southern Conference baseball season was the baseball season for the Southern Conference as part of the 2023 NCAA Division I baseball season. Wofford was predicted to win the conference in the preseason poll. The conference tournament was scheduled for May 24–28 at Fluor Field at the West End in Greenville, South Carolina.

== Regular season ==
The Southern Conference began conference play on March 24. Each team was scheduled to play 21 conference games.

=== Standings ===
Pos	Team	Pld	CW	CL	CPCT	GB	W	L	PCT	Qualification
1	Samford (C, T)	54	15	6	.714	—	32	22	.593	Qualification for the third round & NCAA tournament
2	Mercer	55	13	8	.619	2	32	23	.582	Qualification for the third round
3	Wofford	54	12	9	.571	3	37	17	.685	Qualification for the second round
4	East Tennessee State	52	10	11	.476	5	25	27	.481	Qualification for the second round
5	VMI	54	9	11	.450	5.5	26	28	.481	Qualification for the play-in round
6	UNC Greensboro	54	9	12	.429	6	22	32	.407	Qualification for the play-in round
7	Western Carolina	53	8	12	.400	6.5	21	32	.396	Qualification for the play-in round
8	The Citadel	51	7	14	.333	8	22	29	.431	Qualification for the play-in round

Source: SoCon
(C) Champion; (T) Tournament champion

=== Conference Game Results ===
Home \ Away	CIT	ETSU	MER	SAM	UNCG	VMI	WCU	WOF
The Citadel		1–2	1–2			2–1		0–3
East Tennessee State				1–2	2–1		2–1	1–2
Mercer		3–0		0–3	2–1		1–2	
Samford	3–0				2–1		2–1	
UNC Greensboro	1–2						2–1	2–1
VMI		1–2	1–2	1–2	2–1			
Western Carolina	2–1					0–2 (Note: The final game of the WCU-VMI series was cancelled due to inclement weather.)		1–2
Wofford			0–3	2–1		2–1		

Updated to match(es) played on May 20, 2023. Source: SoCon
Legend: Blue = home team win; Red = away team win.

== Tournament ==
2023 Southern Conference baseball tournament
- Teams: 8
- Format: Single-elimination play-in, then six-team double-elimination tournament with championship game
- Finals site: Fluor Field at the West End; Greenville, SC
- Champions: Samford (4th title)
- Winning coach: Tony David (1st title)
- MVP: Heath Clevenger (Samford)
- Television: ESPN+

The 2023 Southern Conference baseball tournament was held on May 24 through May 27 at Fluor Field at the West End in Greenville, South Carolina. The winner of the conference tournament received an automatic bid to the 2023 NCAA Division I baseball tournament.

All eight SoCon baseball teams participated in the tournament, with the bottom four seeds having played a single-elimination play-in round. The remaining teams then played a six-team double-elimination tournament, with the top two seeds receiving byes into the third round, and the third and fourth placed teams playing the play-in round winners in the second round. The UNC Greensboro Spartans were the defending champions, but were eliminated by the Samford Bulldogs in the loser's bracket final. Wofford came out as the only team to not go through the loser's bracket, but lost two games to Samford, giving the Bulldogs their fourth SoCon baseball tournament title. Samford's Heath Clevenger was named the Tournament Most Outstanding Player.

=== Bracket ===
Play-in round
Game 1
5	VMI	2
8	The Citadel	5
Game 2
6	UNC Greensboro	4
7	Western Carolina	3

Second round
Game 3
4	East Tennessee State	12^{7}
8	The Citadel	0
Game 4
3	Wofford	6
6	UNC Greensboro	1
Lower third round
Game 7
6	UNC Greensboro	4
4	East Tennessee State	2
Game 8
8	The Citadel	1
2	Mercer	8

Third round
Game 5
1	Samford	2
4	East Tennessee State	1
Game 6
2	Mercer	14
3	Wofford	16
Lower semifinal
Game 10
6	UNC Greensboro	9
2	Mercer	5

Semifinals
Game 9
1	Samford	6
3	Wofford	7
Lower final
Game 11
1	Samford	9
6	UNC Greensboro	5

Final
Games 12 and 13
3	Wofford	2	2
1	Samford	7	5

=== Schedule ===
Game	Time^{*}	Matchup^{#}	Score
Day 1 (Wednesday, May 24)
1	3:00 p.m.	No. 5 VMI vs. No. 8 The Citadel	2-5
2	7:00 p.m.	No. 6 UNC Greensboro vs. No. 7 Western Carolina	4-3
Day 2 (Thursday, May 25)
3	9:00 a.m.	No. 8 The Citadel vs. No. 4 East Tennessee State	0-12^{7}
4	12:30 p.m.	No. 6 UNC Greensboro vs. No. 3 Wofford	1-6
5	4:00 p.m.	No. 4 East Tennessee State vs. No. 1 Samford	1-2
6	7:30 p.m.	No. 3 Wofford vs. No. 2 Mercer	16-14
Day 3 (Friday, May 26)
7	9:00 a.m.	No. 6 UNC Greensboro vs. No. 4 East Tennessee State	4-2
8	12:30 p.m.	No. 8 The Citadel vs. No. 2 Mercer	1-8
9	4:00 p.m.	No. 1 Samford vs. No. 3 Wofford	6-7
10	7:30 p.m.	No. 6 UNC Greensboro vs. No. 2 Mercer	9-5
Day 4 (Saturday, May 27)
11	8:00 a.m.	No. 1 Samford vs. No. 6 UNC Greensboro	9-5
12	10:30 a.m.	No. 3 Wofford vs. No. 1 Samford	2-7
13	1:00 p.m.	No. 3 Wofford vs. No. 1 Samford	2-5
*Game times are in EDT. # – Rankings denote tournament seed.

== Conference leaders ==
Hitting leaders
Stat	Player	Total
AVG	Justin Starke (VMI)	.392
HR	John Anderson (SAM)	22
RBI	Ryan Galanie (WOF)	66
R	Treyson Hughes (MER)	74
H	Ryan Galanie (WOF)	88
SB	Ty Swaim (VMI)	35

Pitching leaders
Stat	Player	Total
W	Matthew Marchal (WOF)	11
L	Jay Miller (UNCG)	8
ERA	Lucas Mahlstedt (WOF)	2.69
K	Jacob Cravey (SAM)	121
IP	Jacob Cravey (SAM)	98.2
SV	Ben Petschke (SAM)	14

Conference leaders statistics include all regular season and SoCon tournament games.

== See also ==
- 2023 in baseball
