= Dan Hayden (baseball) =

American college baseball coach

Biographical details
- Born: May 29, 1984 (age 40); Cincinnati, Ohio, U.S.

Playing career
- 2004: Miami (OH)
- 2005–2008: Xavier
- Position(s): C

Coaching career (HC unless noted)
- 2009–2010: Miami (OH) (Asst.)
- 2011–2013: Xavier (Asst.)
- 2014–2023: Miami (OH)

Head coaching record
- Overall: 241–274
- Tournaments: MAC: 5–8

Dan Hayden, known as Danny Hayden, is an American college baseball coach, serving until May 2023 as head coach of the Miami RedHawks baseball program for 10 seasons. He was named to that position prior to the 2014 season. Miami announced that it had parted ways with Hayden in May 2023. His record in 10 seasons was 241-274.

Hayden played baseball at Miami for one season before transferring to Xavier when coaching staffs changed. After his college career, he served as director of baseball operations and volunteer assistant coach at Miami for one season each before earning a full-time assistant position at Xavier in 2011. In July 2013, he was named head coach of the RedHawks. His family has made significant financial contributions to the Miami athletic department. The RedHawks' home field, Hayden Park, is named for Dan's grandfather, Joseph P. Hayden. And the baseball office and practice facility, the Jay Hayden Baseball Center, is named for Dan's father.

== Head coaching record ==
Below is a table of Hayden's yearly records as an NCAA head baseball coach.

Statistics overview
Season	Team	Overall	Conference	Standing	Postseason
Miami RedHawks (Mid-American Conference) (2014–2023)
2014	Miami (OH)	30–27	18–9	1st (East)	MAC Tournament
2015	Miami (OH)	13–39	11–16	5th (East)	
2016	Miami (OH)	27–29	14–10	2nd (East)	MAC Tournament
2017	Miami (OH)	22–34	8–16	5th (East)	
2018	Miami (OH)	35–20	17–10	2nd	MAC Tournament
2019	Miami (OH)	37–19	15–11	4th	MAC Tournament
2020	Miami (OH)	8–7	0–0		Season canceled due to COVID-19
2021	Miami (OH)	25–31	18–22	T-7th	
2022	Miami (OH)	23–33	18–22	6th	
2023	Miami (OH)	21–35	13–17	T-7th	
Miami (OH):		241–274	132–133		
Total:		241–274			
National champion Postseason invitational champion Conference regular season champion Conference regular season and conference tournament champion Division regular season champion Division regular season and conference tournament champion Conference tournament champion

== See also ==
- List of current NCAA Division I baseball coaches
