= Nick Barese =

American baseball player and coach (born 1986)

Current position
- Title: Head Coach
- Team: UMass Lowell
- Conference: America East
- Record: 63–97 (.394)

Biographical details
- Born: October 29, 1986 (age 39)

Playing career
- 2005–2009: Saint Anselm Hawks
- 2009–2010: Rangers Redipuglia Baseball Club
- Position: Pitcher

Coaching career (HC unless noted)
- 2011–2014: Merrimack (asst)
- 2015–2021: Merrimack
- 2022–2023: UMass Lowell (asst)
- 2024–present: UMass Lowell

Head coaching record
- Overall: 216–227 (.488)
- Tournaments: NE: 2–4; NE10 8–6; NCAA: 0–2

Accomplishments and honors

Championships
- Northeast-10 Tournament (2018)

Nicholas Barese (November 29, 1986) is an American baseball coach and former pitcher, who is the current head baseball coach of the UMass Lowell River Hawks. Barese played college baseball at Saint Anselm College from 2005 to 2009 for coaches J. P. Pyne and Barry Rosen and in Saint Anselm College for two seasons from 2009 to 2010. He then served as the head coach of the Merrimack (2015–2021).

Barese was born in Braintree, Massachusetts. He attended Braintree High School in Braintree. After graduation from high school, he attend Saint Anselm College to play football and baseball. Upon graduation from Saint Anselm, he continued his baseball career playing professionally for Rangers Redipuglia Baseball Club.

In 2015, Barese was named the head coach of the Merrimack Warriors baseball program, succeeding his Jim Martin.

== Playing career ==
Barese was born in Braintree, Massachusetts. He attended Braintree High School in Braintree, and was a letterman in football, basketball, baseball and track.

Barese would go on to attend Saint Anselm College, while there he played both quarterback and pitched for the Hawks.

Barese would go on to play professional baseball for the Rangers Redipuglia Baseball Club.

== Coaching career ==
Barese was named an assistant for Merrimack College in 2011.

In September, 2014, he was named the interim head coach of the Warriors after Jim Martin left the team to become an assistant at Rhode Island.

Barese was promoted to head coach in January, 2015. In July, 2021, Barese was fired.

In December 2021, Barese joined the coaching staff of the UMass Lowell River Hawks.

In July 2023, Barese was initially named interim head coach of UMass Lowell for the 2024 season following the resignation of longtime head coach Ken Harring. On August 7, 2023, Barese was officially named as the new head coach of the program.

Record table
Season	Team	Overall	Conference	Standing	Postseason
Merrimack Warriors (Northeast-10 Conference) (2015–2019)
2015	Merrimack	17–19	11–12	4th (Northeast)	
2016	Merrimack	29–18	19–10	3rd (Northeast)	
2017	Merrimack	23–21	17–8	3rd (Northeast)	
2018	Merrimack	31–21	18–11	3rd (Northeast)	NCAA East Regional
2019	Merrimack	28–20	18–9	3rd (Northeast)	
Merrimack Warriors (Northeast Conference) (2020–2021)
2020	Merrimack	6–9	0–0		Season canceled due to COVID-19
2021	Merrimack	19–22	13–14	5th	
Merrimack:		153–130 (.541)	83–50 (.624)		
UMass Lowell River Hawks (America East Conference) (2024–present)
2024	UMass Lowell	24–31	11–12	4th	America East tournament
2025	UMass Lowell	18–35	8–16	T–6th	
2026	UMass Lowell	21–31	10–14	4th	America East tournament
UMass Lowell:		63–97 (.394)	29–42 (.408)		
Total:		216–227 (.488)			
National champion Postseason invitational champion Conference regular season champion Conference regular season and conference tournament champion Division regular season champion Division regular season and conference tournament champion Conference tournament champion
