= 2016 Colonial Athletic Association baseball tournament =

American college baseball tournament

- Teams: 6
- Format: Double-elimination tournament
- Finals site: CofC Baseball Stadium at Patriot's Point; Mount Pleasant, South Carolina
- Champions: William & Mary (2nd title)
- Winning coach: Brian Murphy (1st title)
- MVP: Josh Smith (William & Mary)

2016 Colonial Athletic Association baseball standings
	Conf.						Overall
Team	W		L		T	PCT	W		L		T	PCT
UNC Wilmington ‍†‍‍^{y}	16	–	6	–	0	.727	41	–	19	–	0	.683
William & Mary ‍‍‡‍^{y}	14	–	9	–	0	.609	31	–	31	–	0	.500
Elon ‍‍‍	13	–	10	–	0	.565	25	–	29	–	0	.463
James Madison ‍‍‍	13	–	11	–	0	.542	24	–	31	–	0	.436
Northeastern ‍‍‍	12	–	11	–	0	.522	31	–	27	–	0	.534
College of Charleston ‍‍‍	12	–	12	–	0	.500	31	–	26	–	1	.543
Delaware ‍‍‍	10	–	14	–	0	.417	32	–	22	–	0	.593
Towson ‍‍‍	10	–	14	–	0	.417	20	–	35	–	0	.364
Hofstra ‍‍‍	5	–	18	–	0	.217	15	–	37	–	0	.288
† – Conference champion ‡ – Tournament champion y – Invited to the NCAA tournament As of June 20, 2016; Rankings from Collegiate Baseball

The 2016 Colonial Athletic Association baseball tournament was held at CofC Baseball Stadium at Patriot's Point in Mount Pleasant, South Carolina, from May 25 through 28. The event matched the top six teams from the CAA's regular season to determine the conference champion for the 2016 season. William & Mary won their second title, and first in 15 years, and earned the Colonial Athletic Association's automatic bid to the 2016 NCAA Division I baseball tournament.

Entering the event, UNC Wilmington had won the most championships among active teams, with four. James Madison had claimed two titles, while William & Mary, Towson, and third-year member College of Charleston each had one. Former member East Carolina won 7 titles during their tenure in the conference.

== Seeding and format ==
Continuing the format adopted in 2012, the top six finishers from the regular season will compete in the double-elimination tournament. The top two teams received a single bye and played the winners of the opening round games.

Team	W	L	Pct	GB	Pct
UNC Wilmington	16	6	.727	—	1
William & Mary	14	9	.609	2.5	2
Elon	13	10	.565	3.5	3
James Madison	13	11	.542	4	4
Northeastern	12	11	.522	4.5	5
College of Charleston	12	12	.500	5	6
Delaware	10	14	.417	7	—
Towson	10	14	.417	7	—
Hofstra	5	18	.217	11.5	—

== Bracket ==
Upper round 1	Upper round 2	Upper final	Final
1	UNC Wilmington	5
4	James Madison	3	4	James Madison	4
5	Northeastern	2	1	UNC Wilmington	6
6	College of Charleston	1
2	William & Mary	2
3	Elon	8	6	College of Charleston	7
6	College of Charleston	9
1	UNC Wilmington	8	9
2	William & Mary	9	14
Lower round 1	Lower round 2	Lower round 3	Lower final
2	William & Mary	10
5	Northeastern	2	6	College of Charleston	3
5	Northeastern	19	2	William & Mary	5
5	Northeastern	3	4	James Madison	9
3	Elon	0

== All-Tournament Team ==
The following players were named to the All-Tournament Team.

Name	School
Charles Ameer	William & Mary
Zack Canada	UNC Wilmington
Aaron Civale	Northeastern
Ryan Foster	UNC Wilmington
David Hopkins	Northeastern
Steven Linkous	UNC Wilmington
Bailey Ober	College of Charleston
Dan Powers	William & Mary
Tommy Richter	College of Charleston
Hunter Smith	William & Mary
Josh Smith	William & Mary
Gavin Stupienski	UNC Wilmington

=== Most Valuable Player ===
Josh Smith was named Tournament Most Valuable Player. Smith was an outfielder for William & Mary, who hit a grand slam in the eight inning of the decisive championship game as part of a 3 for 5, 7-RBI game.
