= Chuck Ristano =

American college baseball coach

Current position
- Title: Head coach
- Team: Navy
- Conference: Patriot League
- Record: 54–48

Biographical details
- Education: Sacred Heart University

Playing career
- 2001–2004: Sacred Heart
- Position: Pitcher

Coaching career (HC unless noted)
- 2005: Sacred Heart (assistant)
- 2006–2009: Monmouth (assistant)
- 2010: Temple (pitching coach)
- 2011–2022: Notre Dame (pitching coach)
- 2023: Florida State (pitching coach)
- 2024–present: Navy

Head coaching record
- Overall: 54–48

Chuck Ristano is an American baseball coach, currently serving as the head baseball coach at the United States Naval Academy. Ristano attended Sacred Heart University from 2001 to 2004, where he pitched on the Sacred Heart Pioneers baseball team. Ristano served as an assistant baseball coach at Sacred Heart University in 2005, as an assistant baseball coach at Monmouth University from 2006 to 2009, as a pitching coach at Temple University in 2010, as a pitching coach at the University of Notre Dame from 2011 to 2022, and as a pitching coach at Florida State University in 2023. Ristano was named head baseball coach at the United States Naval Academy on June 17, 2023.

== Head coaching record ==
Record table
Season	Team	Overall	Conference	Standing	Postseason
Navy Midshipmen (Patriot League) (2024–present)
2024	Navy	28–23	15–10	2nd	Patriot League tournament
2025	Navy	26–25	14–11	T–2nd	Patriot League tournament
Navy:		54–48	29–21		
Total:		54–48			
National champion Postseason invitational champion Conference regular season champion Conference regular season and conference tournament champion Division regular season champion Division regular season and conference tournament champion Conference tournament champion
