= Merrimack Warriors baseball =

Merrimack Warriors
- 2026 Merrimack Warriors baseball team
- Founded: 1980
- University: Merrimack College
- Head coach: Jeff Mejia (1st season)
- Conference: Metro Atlantic Athletic Conference
- Location: North Andover, Massachusetts
- Home stadium: Warrior Baseball Diamond
- Nickname: Warriors
- Colors: Blue and gold

NCAA tournament appearances
- Division II: 1990, 1996, 1999, 2018

Conference tournament champions
- Northeast-10: 1990, 1995, 1996, 2018

Conference regular season champions
- Northeast-10: 1994, 1995, 1996, 1997, 1999

The Merrimack Warriors baseball team is the varsity intercollegiate athletic team of the Merrimack College in North Andover, Massachusetts, United States. The team competes in the National Collegiate Athletic Association's Division I and is a member of the Metro Atlantic Athletic Conference.

== History ==
The Merrimack baseball program was started in 1980. They joined the Northeast-10 Conference in 1985. While the first few seasons were dismal, the 1988 season saw the team go 9-7 in the NE-10 and 24-15 overall but they finished it off with a win in the ECAC North tournament. This was their first winning season since their inaugural season. They would follow this up next season by going 19-17-2 overall and winning their second straight ECAC North tournament title.

Under head coach Ed Morrison, the Warriors won the NE10 tournament in 1990 as the 4th seed to clinch their first NE-10 title and reach the NCAA Division II Tournament for the first time in program history. Morrison left after the 1992 season and was replaced by Barry Rosen. The Warriors won the regular season title four straight years from 1994 to 1997, with a ECAC title occurring in 1995 to go along with NE-10 tournament championships in 1995 and 1996. They reached the NCAA Tournament in 1996 for the second time in program history. The 1999 team won their fifth regular season title and despite losing in the tournament final, they received an invite to the NCAA Tournament.

The team did not make a major run again until 2013, when they went 30-19 and made it to the NE10 championship final, losing to New Haven. The 2018 team beat New Haven to win the NE-10 title and make the NCAA Tournament for the first time in nearly two decades. In 2020, the Warriors joined NCAA Division I with the Northeast Conference. Their season was cut short after going 6–9 due to the COVID-19 pandemic. In 2021, their first full season as a D-I program, they went 19–22. The 2024 team had their first winning season as a D-I program at 33–26 and advanced to their first NEC tournament and made it to the Semifinals before losing to Long Island.

In 2025, the Warriors joined the Metro Atlantic Athletic Conference.

== Head coaches ==
Years	Coach	Overall record	Regular season titles	Conference titles	NCAA appearances
1980-1980	James Licciardi	14-6-1	0	0	0
1984-1992	Ed Morrison	111-174-1	0	1	1
1993-2003	Barry Rosen	207-231-2	5	2	2
2004-2010	Joe Sarno	118-179	0	0	0
2011-2014	Jim Martin	82-100	0	0	0
2015-2021	Nick Barese	153-130	0	1	1
2022-2026	Brian Murphy	114–150–2	0	0	0

== Conference Memberships ==
- 1985-2019: Northeast10
- 2020-2024: Northeast Conference
- 2025-Present: Metro Athletic Conference

== Player/Coaches Awards ==
=== NEC Rookie of the year ===
- Dawson Bryce (2024)

=== ECAC Rookie of the year ===
- Dawson Bryce (2024)

=== NE10 Player of the year ===
- Jerry Parent (1995)
- Casey Cotter (2013)
- Frank Crinella (2014)
- Joey Porricelli (2019)

=== NE10 Rookie of the year ===
- George Evangelista (1988)
- Jamie Newell (1992)
- Frank Crinella (2013)

=== Bob Bellizzi NE10 Coach of the Year award ===
- Ed Morrison (1988,1990)

=== All Americans ===
- David Miles (1992) (A)
- Jerry Parent (1995)
- Chris MacDonald (1995, 1996) (A)
- Garret Larkin (1996)
- David Melchionda (1997)
- Joe Mantoni (2013) (A)
- Casey Cotter (2013)
- Frank Crinella (2014)
- Matthew Ronai (2018) (A)
- Joey Porricelli (2019) (A)
- Thomas Joyce (2020) (A)

=== Merrimack Athletics hall of fame ===
The following is a list of people associated with the Merrimack men's Baseball program who were elected into the Merrimack college Athletic Hall of Fame (induction date in parentheses)

- James Licciardi (1993)
- Donald Weinbach (1993)
- Ryan P. O'Rourke (2019)
- Jeff Bercume (2022)

== Warriors drafted to the MLB ==
Player	Position	Draft year	Round	Team
Frank Crinella	INF	2015	39th	Baltimore Orioles
Joe Mantoni	Pitcher	2013	18th	Cincinnati Reds
Ryan O'Rourke	Pitcher	2010	13th	Minnesota Twins
John Guilmet	Pitcher	1997	34th	Detroit Tigers
Garrett Larkin	3rd base	1996	19th	Pittsburgh Pirates
Jerry Parent	Out Fielder	1995	31st	Milwaukee Brewers
George Evangelista	3rd Base	1990	47th	Texas Rangers

== Postseason Results ==
=== Division II ===
Merrimack has participated in the NCAA Division II baseball tournament four times.

Year	Round	Opponents	Result
1990	First Round	Sacred Heart New Haven	L 10-6 L 19-2
1996	First Round Second Round	Adelphi New Haven Adelphi	L 8-2 W 2-1 L 9-2
1999	First Round Second Round	UMass Lowell Adelphi Umass Lowell	W 3-1 L 7-6 L 12-2
2018	First Round	Le Moyne Wilmington	L 3-2 L 10-5

=== ECAC Tournament ===
The warriors appeared in the ECAC tournament 3 times and were victorious all 3 times.

Year	Coach	Overall record	Result
1988	Ed Morrison	24-15	Champions
1989	Ed Morrison	19-17-1	Champions
1995	Barry Rosen	28-13	Champions
