= John Yurkow =

American college baseball coach

Current position
- Title: Head coach
- Team: Penn
- Conference: Ivy League
- Record: 250–216–1 (.536)

Playing career
- 1995–1999: Rowan
- Position: Second baseman

Coaching career (HC unless noted)
- 2000–2001: Rowan (Asst.)
- 2002–2005: Duke (Asst.)
- 2007–2013: Penn (Asst.)
- 2014–present: Penn

Head coaching record
- Overall: 250–216–1 (.536)
- Tournaments: NCAA: 2–4

Accomplishments and honors

Championships
- 2x Ivy League Tournament: (2023, 2024); 2x Ivy League: (2022, 2023); 3x Gehrig Division: (2014, 2015, 2017)

Awards
- Ivy League Coach of the Year (2023)

John Yurkow an American college baseball coach, currently serving as head coach of the Penn Quakers baseball program. He was named to that position prior to the 2014 season.

Raised in Washington Township, Gloucester County, New Jersey, Yurkow attended Gloucester Catholic High School.

Yurkow played second base at Rowan University, and earned his first coaching position with the Profs immediately after graduation. He served two years before moving to Duke for four seasons. He then accepted a position at Penn as the top assistant to head coach John Cole, who had previously coached him at Rowan. Upon Cole's firing after the 2013 seasons, Yurkow was elevated to the head coaching position.

== Head coaching record ==
Below is a table of Yurkow's yearly records as an NCAA head baseball coach.

Record table
Season	Team	Overall	Conference	Standing	Postseason
Penn Quakers (Ivy League) (2014–present)
2014	Penn	24–17	15–5	T-1st (Gehrig)	
2015	Penn	22–15	16–4	T-1st (Gehrig)	
2016	Penn	19–22	10–10	T-2nd (Gehrig)	
2017	Penn	23–22	13–8	T-1st (Gehrig)	Ivy League Championship Series
2018	Penn	16–25–1	9–11–1	5th	
2019	Penn	23–18	11–10	4th	
2020	Penn	3–5	0–0		Season canceled due to COVID-19
2021	Penn	6–8	0–0		Penn was only Ivy League school to play baseball
2022	Penn	33–15	17–4	T-1st	Ivy League Championship Series
2023	Penn	34–16	16–5	1st	NCAA Regional
2024	Penn	24–25	11–10	T–3rd	NCAA Regional
2025	Penn	21–20	13–8	3rd	Ivy League Tournament
2026	Penn	2–8	0–0		
Penn:		250–216–1 (.536)	131–76–1 (.632)		
Total:		250–216–1 (.536)			
National champion Postseason invitational champion Conference regular season champion Conference regular season and conference tournament champion Division regular season champion Division regular season and conference tournament champion Conference tournament champion

== See also ==
- List of current NCAA Division I baseball coaches
