= Ken Harring =

American college baseball coach (born 1967)

Kenneth Harring
Biographical details
- Born: February 10, 1967 (age 59); Troy, New York, U.S.
- Education: Le Moyne College '89 (B.A.)

Playing career
- 1986–1989: Le Moyne
- 1989: Idaho Falls Braves
- 1990: Durham Bulls

Coaching career (HC unless noted)
- 1997–2000: Northeastern (Asst.)
- 2001–2004: Saint Anselm
- 2005–2023: UMass Lowell

Head coaching record
- Overall: 541–555–1 (.494)

Accomplishments and honors

Awards
- NE–10 Coach of the Year (2004)

Kenneth Nils Harring (born February 10, 1967) is an American college baseball coach who was the head coach of UMass Lowell from 2004 until 2023.

== Playing career ==
Harring was a four-year player at NCAA Division II Le Moyne College where he helped the Dolphins to NCAA tournament bids in 1986, 1987 and 1989.

Among Le Moyne's Division I leaders, Harring ranks second in batting (.367), third in slugging percentage (.609) and 21st in hits (108). He led the Dolphins in runs, hits and doubles in his junior and senior years. He was inducted into Le Moyne's Gold Wave Hall of Fame in 2003, Harring helped the Dolphins to a collective record of 54-18-1 in his junior and senior seasons (.740), Le Moyne's first years as a Division I program.

After graduating from Le Moyne with a degree in business administration, Harring spent two years in the Atlanta Braves organization with the Durham Bulls of the Carolina League where his manager was former Boston Red Sox's manager Grady Little.

== Coaching career ==
=== Northeastern ===
Harring accepted his first coaching position at Northeastern University, where he remained from 1996–1999. During his stay, the Huskies posted a collective 105–88 record and captured the 1997 America East Conference Tournament. That year, the Huskies advanced to the NCAA tournament where it defeated Bethune–Cookman, before falling to Stanford and Cal State–Fullerton in the West Regional. While at Northeastern in 1999, Harring served as an assistant coach of the Cotuit Kettleers of the Cape Cod Baseball League.

=== Saint Anselm ===
In 2000, Harring was named the head coach at Saint Anselm College. Shortly after his appointment to Saint Anselm, Harring served as the manager of the Keene Swamp Bats, leading them to the 2000 New England Collegiate Baseball League (NECBL) championship.

Harring's teams at Saint Anselm significantly improved with each season, culminating with the record-breaking season in 2004. After struggling to a 9–35 finish in 2001, Harring guided the Hawks to a 17–32 clip in 2002, which included a 15–17 showing in the NE-10 (fourth place in the six-team Pepin Division).

The 2003 Saint Anselm squad posted a record of 23–20 (its first winning season in 23 years) and captured the Eastern College Athletic Conference (ECAC) Division II championship. Along the way, the Hawks finished third in the NE-10 Pepin Division and garnered their first appearance in the NE-10 Tournament.

The 2004 Northeast-10 Conference Coach of the Year, Harring guided Saint Anselm to its best season in school history with a 30–22 overall record (24-8 NE-10). He led the Hawks to the 2004 NE-10 regular season championship as well as its first NCAA tournament bid in school history. Under his guidance, the Hawks posted a record of 79–109 including a NE-10 conference record of 63–59.

=== UMass Lowell ===
Harring and UMass Lowell saw continued success in 2015, finishing third in the America East with a 17–26 overall record and a 10–10 record in conference. Four River Hawks earned America East All-Conference honors including shortstop Danny Mendick who was drafted in the 22nd round by the Chicago White Sox, becoming the third player to be drafted under Harring's tenure.

The UMass Lowell baseball team transitioned to Division I with little problems in 2014, finishing third in their new conference, the America East, with an overall record of 20–22 and a 10–10 in-conference.

UMass Lowell enjoyed a great deal of success in 2011, going 37–14 and clinching the fourth NCAA tournament bid of Harring's tenure. While there, the River Hawks eliminated Dowling in the East Regional.

Harring steered the 2009 squad to a 25–21 record and the Northeast-10 Conference Tournament semifinals. Under his watch, six River Hawks were named to the NE-10 All-Star Team and Jack Leathersich claimed the NE-10 Freshman Pitcher of the Year honor.

With 18 freshmen and sophomores on its 2008 roster, UMass Lowell compiled a 26–24 record and advanced to the Northeast-10 Conference Tournament. Over the season, Harring earned his 100th victory at UMass Lowell and the 200th of his career.

The 2007 season saw the River Hawks go 33–20, marking the second straight year and ninth time in school history UML has eclipsed the 30-victory plateau.

In 2006, the River Hawks (37–14) posted the second-highest win total in school history and captured their fifth Northeast-10 Conference Tournament championship in six years. UML also earned its second straight and eighth NCAA tournament appearance in the last nine years.

In his first season at UML, Harring led the River Hawks to a 28–20 record, up from a 22–21 clip in 2004. UML returned to the NCAA tournament as the No. 4 seed in the region, where it defeated No. 1 Franklin Pierce (8–2) before losing to No. 2 Southern Connecticut (10–3) and the Ravens (16–11).

In Harring's first three seasons, the River Hawks have had eight players named to the ABCA/Rawlings All-Northeast Region teams and 26 players named to the NE-10 All-Conference teams.

Herring announced he was resigning from UMass Lowell in July 2023.

== Personal life ==
Harring and his wife, Shauna, live in Amesbury, Massachusetts, with their daughter Mikaela and son Jacob.

== Head coaching record ==
Record table
Season	Team	Overall	Conference	Standing	Postseason
Saint Anselm College Hawks (Northeast-10 Conference) (2001–2004)
2001	Saint Anselm	9–35	9–24		
2002	Saint Anselm	17–32	15–17		
2003	Saint Anselm	23–20	15–10	1st	
2004	Saint Anselm	30–22	24–8		
Saint Anselm:		79–109 (.420)	63–59 (.516)		
UMass Lowell River Hawks (Northeast-10 Conference) (2005–2013)
2005	UMass Lowell	28–20			NCAA Division II baseball tournament
2006	UMass Lowell	37–14	20–10	4th	
2007	UMass Lowell	33–20	25–5	2nd	
2008	UMass Lowell	26–24	18–2	4th	
2009	UMass Lowell	25–21	15–15	6th	
2010	UMass Lowell	27–19	14–12	7th	
2011	UMass Lowell	37–14	18–8	4th	
2012	UMass Lowell	26–20–1	16–14	6th (Northeast)	
2013	UMass Lowell	30–19	15–12	5th (Northeast)	
UMass Lowell:			141–78 (.644)		
UMass Lowell River Hawks (America East Conference) (2014–2023)
2014	UMass Lowell	20–22	10–10	3rd	Ineligible
2015	UMass Lowell	17–26	10–10	4th	Ineligible
2016	UMass Lowell	20–32	5–19	7th	Ineligible
2017	UMass Lowell	22–26	10–13	5th	Ineligible
2018	UMass Lowell	25–29	13–11	2nd	America East tournament
2019	UMass Lowell	20–36	12–12	4th	America East tournament
2020	UMass Lowell	4–11	0–0		Season canceled due to COVID-19
2021	UMass Lowell	19–28	18–20	T–3rd (Division A)	
2022	UMass Lowell	28–30	15–15	2nd (Division A)	America East tournament
2023	UMass Lowell	20–35	11–13	T–5th	America East tournament
UMass Lowell:		462–446–1 (.509)	99–122 (.448)		
Total:		541–555–1 (.494)			
National champion Postseason invitational champion Conference regular season champion Conference regular season and conference tournament champion Division regular season champion Division regular season and conference tournament champion Conference tournament champion

== See also ==
- UMass Lowell River Hawks
