= Eric Roof =

American baseball coach (born 1986)

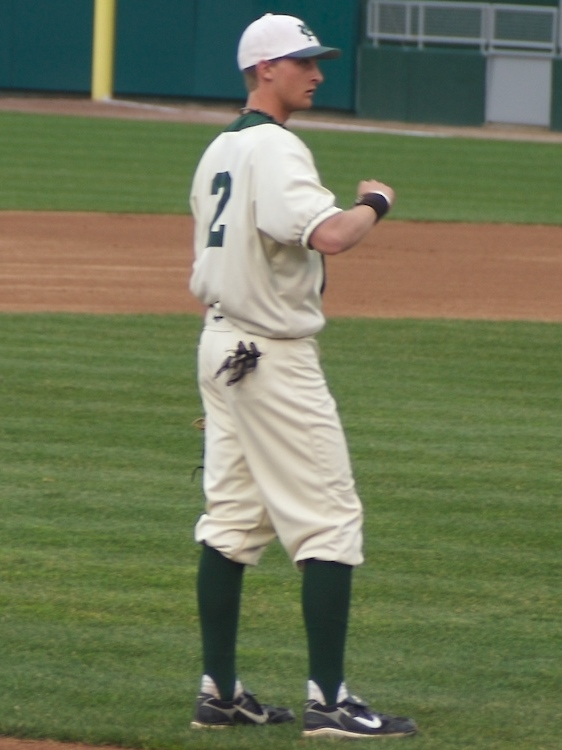
- Roof with Michigan State in 2007

Biographical details
- Born: November 15, 1986 (age 39); Paducah, Kentucky, U.S.

Playing career
- 2006: St. Catharine College
- 2007–2009: Michigan State
- 2009: Oneonta Tigers
- 2010: West Michigan Whitecaps
- 2010: Connecticut Tigers
- 2011: Lakeland Flying Tigers
- Position: Catcher

Coaching career (HC unless noted)
- 2013–2014: Michigan State (vol. asst.)
- 2015–2017: Eastern Michigan (asst.)
- 2018: Eastern Michigan (Interim HC)
- 2019–2023: Eastern Michigan

Head coaching record
- Overall: 78–153–1
- Tournaments: MAC: 4–2; NCAA: 0–0

Eric Christopher Roof (born November 15, 1986) is an American college baseball coach and former catcher. He is the former head baseball coach at Eastern Michigan University. Roof played college baseball at St. Catharine College and at Michigan State University for coaches David Grewe and Jake Boss from 2007 to 2009.

== Amateur career ==
Roof attended St. Mary High School in Paducah, Kentucky. Roof then enrolled at St. Catharine College, to play college baseball for the Patriots baseball team.

As a freshman at St. Catharine College in 2006, Roof had a .345 batting average, 4 home runs and a 33 RBIs.

As a sophomore in 2007, Roof transferred to Michigan State University to play for the Michigan State Spartans baseball team. He batted .247 with a .333 SLG, 1 home run, and 9 RBIs.

In the 2008 season as a junior, Roof hit .308 with a .423 SLG, 3 home runs, and 33 RBIs. Roof was drafted in the 46th round of the 2008 Major League Baseball draft by the Detroit Tigers, but Roof opted to return to Michigan State for his senior season.

Roof had his best season as a senior in 2009, hitting a career high in doubles (14), home runs (6), RBIs (41) and slugged (.525).

== Professional career ==
Roof was drafted by the Tigers again, this time in the 18th round of the 2009 Major League Baseball draft. Roof played 3 years in the Tigers's organization. Playing for the Oneonta Tigers, West Michigan Whitecaps, Connecticut Tigers and Lakeland Flying Tigers.

== Coaching career ==
Roof returned to Michigan State as a volunteer assistant in 2013 and remained with the program through 2014. In late December 2017, Van Ameyde left Eastern Michigan to become the pitching coach at Michigan State. On January 3, 2018, Roof was named the interim head coach for the Eagles.

On June 4, 2018, Roof was named the full-time head coach of the Eastern Michigan program.

== Head coaching record ==
Statistics overview
Season	Team	Overall	Conference	Standing	Postseason
Eastern Michigan Eagles (Mid-American Conference) (2018–2023)
2018	Eastern Michigan	22–34	14–13	6th	Mid-American Tournament
2019	Eastern Michigan	11–43–1	6–21	9th	
2020	Eastern Michigan	2–12	0–0		Season canceled due to COVID-19
2021	Eastern Michigan	21–30	15–25	T-9th	
2022	Eastern Michigan	22–34	16–24	7th	
2023	Eastern Michigan	27-26	12–18	T-9th	
Eastern Michigan:		105–179–1	63–101		
Total:		105–179–1			
National champion Postseason invitational champion Conference regular season champion Conference regular season and conference tournament champion Division regular season champion Division regular season and conference tournament champion Conference tournament champion
