= Navy Midshipmen baseball =

Varsity intercollegiate athletic team

Navy Midshipmen
- 2026 Navy Midshipmen baseball team
- Founded: 1893
- University: United States Naval Academy
- Head coach: Chuck Ristano (3rd season)
- Conference: Patriot League
- Location: Annapolis, Maryland
- Home stadium: Terwilliger Brothers Field at Max Bishop Stadium (Capacity: 1,500)
- Nickname: Midshipmen
- Colors: Navy blue and gold

NCAA tournament appearances
- 1954, 1979, 1982, 1986, 1995, 1999, 2002, 2011, 2016

Conference tournament champions
- 1994, 1998, 1999, 2002, 2011, 2016

Conference regular season champions
- EIBL: 1954, 1959, 1961, 1962, 1963, 1979, 1982, 1986 Patriot League: 1995, 1998, 1999, 2000, 2001, 2002, 2011, 2015, 2016, 2017, 2018, 2019

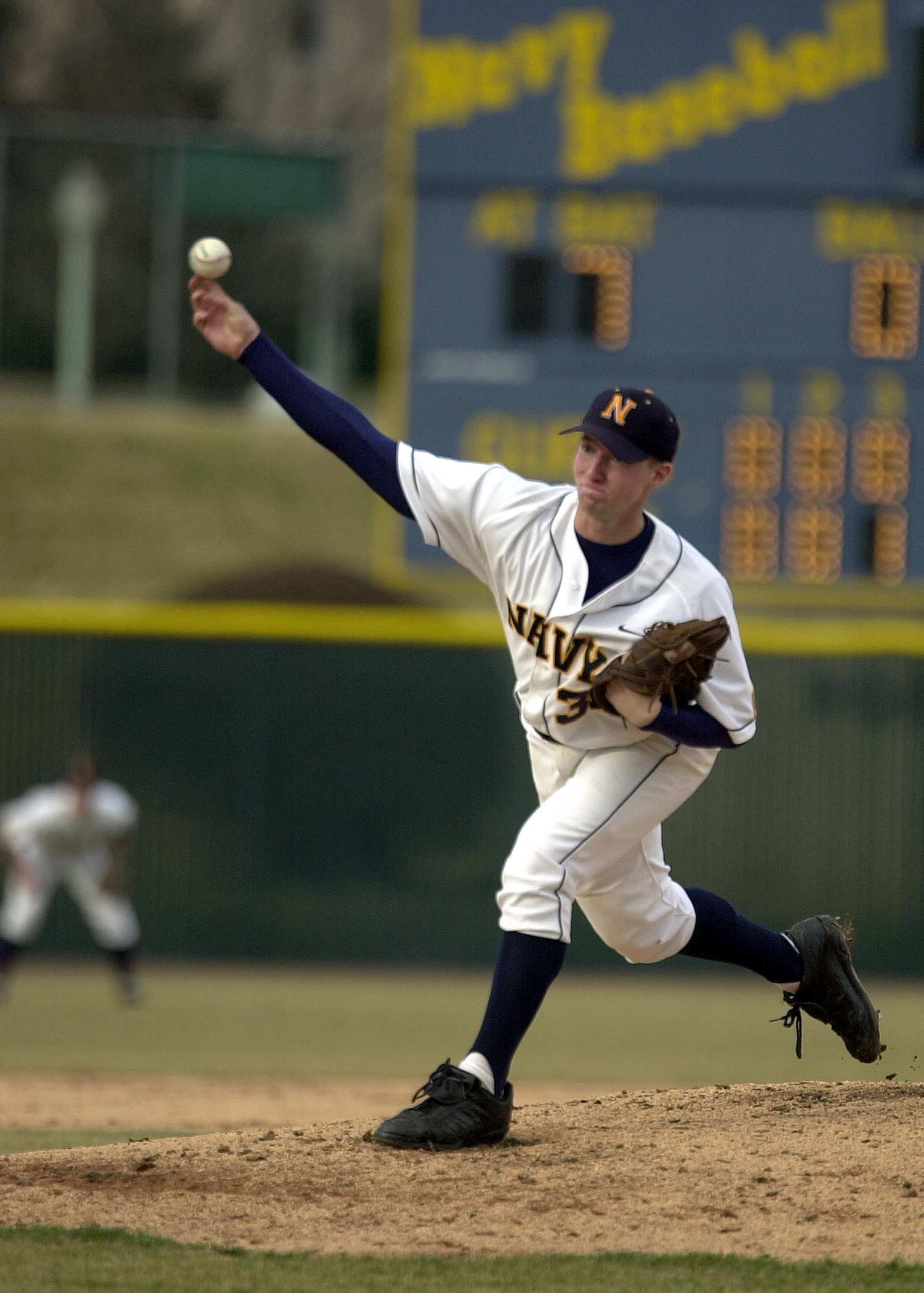
US Naval Academy baseball player

The Navy Midshipmen baseball team is a varsity intercollegiate athletic team of the United States Naval Academy in Annapolis, Maryland, United States. The team is a member of the Patriot League, which is part of the National Collegiate Athletic Association's Division I. Navy's first baseball team was fielded in 1893. The team plays its home games at Terwilliger Brothers Field at Max Bishop Stadium in Annapolis, Maryland. The Midshipmen are currently coached by Chuck Ristano. Navy has won the Patriot League baseball tournament six times (1994, 1998, 1999, 2002, 2011, 2016) and have represented the League in NCAA tournament play seven times (1995 saw them selected with no prior tournament play) while winning the regular season championship twelve times.

== Navy in the NCAA Tournament ==
The NCAA Division I baseball tournament started in 1947. The Midshipmen have played in the tournament nine times, most recently in 2016.

Season	Region	Opponent	Result
1954	District 2 Semifinals	St. John's	L 2–4
1979	Northeast Regional	Connecticut; Nebraska	L 4–5; L 4–13
1982	Northeast Regional	Delaware; Seton Hall; Delaware; Maine	L 3–4; W 15–5; W 3–1; L 3–4
1986	Atlantic Regional	Georgia Tech; Alabama	L 8–9 (14); L 1–4
1995	Atlantic II Regional	Clemson; Alabama	L 4–8; L 0–7
1999	Tuscaloosa Regional	Alabama; South Alabama	L 3–16; L 0–10
2002	Winston-Salem Regional	Richmond; George Washington; Wake Forest	L 5–15; W 6–4; L 1–13
2011	Charlottesville Regional	Virginia; East Carolina	L 0–6; L 1–6
2016	Raleigh Regional	NC State; Saint Mary's (CA); NC State	L 8–13; W 8–5 (13); L 1–17
TOTALS	4–17	.190	9 Tournaments

== Major League Baseball ==
Navy has had 10 Major League Baseball draft selections since the draft began in 1965.

Midshipmen in the Major League Baseball Draft
Year	Player	Round	Team
2003	Matt Foster	13	Blue Jays
2007	Jonathan Johnston	42	Athletics
2007	Mitch Harris	24	Braves
2008	Oliver Drake	43	Orioles
2008	Mitch Harris	13	Cardinals
2012	Preston Gainey	11	Brewers
2012	Alex Azor	10	Blue Jays
2015	Stephen Moore	10	Braves
2016	Luke Gillingham	37	Blue Jays
2019	Noah Song	4	Red Sox

== See also ==
- List of NCAA Division I baseball programs
