= Aaron Meade =

American baseball player and coach

Biographical details
- Born: May 2, 1988 (age 38); Kansas City, Missouri, U.S.

Playing career
- 2007–2010: Missouri State
- 2010: Arizona League Angels
- 2010–2011: Orem Owlz
- 2012: Cedar Rapids Kernels
- 2012: Inland Empire 66ers
- 2013: Kansas City T-Bones
- Position: Pitcher

Coaching career (HC unless noted)
- 2014: Missouri State (P)
- 2015: William Jewell (P)
- 2016–2019: Pittsburg State (P)
- 2020–2023: Tarleton State

Head coaching record
- Overall: 51–81
- Tournaments: WAC: 0–0; NCAA: 0–0

Aaron Meade (born May 2, 1988) is an American baseball coach and former pitcher. He was the head baseball coach of the Tarleton State Texans. Meade played college baseball at Missouri State from 2007 to 2010 and in Minor League Baseball (MiLB) for four seasons from 2010 to 2013.

== Playing career ==
Meade attended Rockhurst High School in Kansas City, Missouri, where he played for the school's baseball team. As a senior, he pitched in the All-Missouri East/West All-Star Game. After high school, Meade signed to play college baseball for the Missouri State Bears. In 2009, he played collegiate summer baseball with the Harwich Mariners of the Cape Cod Baseball League and was named a league all-star.

== Coaching career ==
On August 20, 2015, Meade was hired as the pitching coach at Pittsburg State University.

On July 24, 2019, Meade was named the head baseball coach of the Tarleton State Texans.

== Head coaching record ==
Record table
| Season | Team | Overall | Conference | Standing | Postseason |
|---|---|---|---|---|---|
Tarleton State Texans (Lone Star Conference) (2020)
| 2020 | Tarleton State | 14–10 | 14–10 | | Season canceled due to COVID-19 |
| Tarleton State: | | | 14–10 | | |
Tarleton State Texans (Western Athletic Conference) (2021–present)
| 2021 | Tarleton State | 20–35 | 13–23 | 7th | ineligible |
| 2022 | Tarleton State | 17–36 | 10–20 | 5th (Southwest) | |
| Tarleton State: | | 51–81 | 23–43 | | |
| Total: | | 51–81 | | | |
National champion Postseason invitational champion Conference regular season champion Conference regular season and conference tournament champion Division regular season champion Division regular season and conference tournament champion Conference tournament champion

== See also ==
- List of current NCAA Division I baseball coaches
