= UMass Lowell River Hawks baseball =

Baseball team at the University of Massachusetts Lowell

UMass Lowell River Hawks
- 2026 UMass Lowell River Hawks baseball team
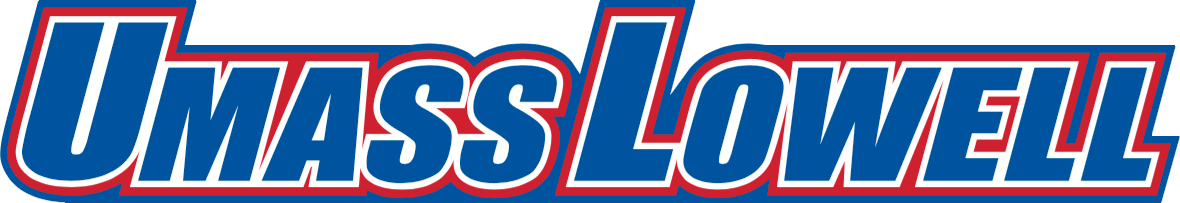
- Founded: 1976
- Overall record: 128–182
- University: University of Massachusetts Lowell
- Head coach: Nick Barese (3rd season)
- Conference: America East Conference
- Location: Lowell, Massachusetts
- Home stadium: Edward A. LeLacheur Park (Capacity: 4,797)
- Nickname: River Hawks
- Colors: Blue, white, and red

College World Series appearances
- Division II: 2001, 2002

NCAA tournament appearances
- Division II; 1979, 1981, 1984, 1987, 1988, 1991, 1995, 1997, 1999, 2000, 2001, 2002, 2003, 2005, 2006, 2007, 2011

Conference tournament champions
- NE-10: 2001, 2002, 2003, 2004, 2006

Conference regular season champions
- NE-10: 2001, 2002, 2003

The UMass Lowell River Hawks baseball team represents University of Massachusetts Lowell, which is located in Lowell, Massachusetts. The River Hawks are an NCAA Division I college baseball program that competes in the America East Conference. They began competing in Division I in 2014 and joined the America East Conference the same season.

The UMass Lowell River Hawks play all home games at Edward A. LeLacheur Park. Over their two seasons of postseason eligibility in the America East Conference, the River Hawks have played in two America East Tournaments, advancing to the semifinals in 2018 but have yet to play in the NCAA Division I Tournament.

Since the program's inception in 1976, five River Hawks have gone on to play in Major League Baseball, highlighted by 1987 Gold Glove catcher Mike LaValliere. Over the program's 35 seasons, 22 River Hawks have been drafted, including Jack Leathersich who was selected in the fifth round of the 2011 Major League Baseball draft.

== Conference membership history (Division I only) ==
- 2014–present: America East Conference

== Edward A. LeLacheur Park ==
The River Hawks' home field is Edward A. LeLacheur Park, a ballpark on the UMass Lowell campus that seats 4,767 people and opened in 1998.

== Head coaches (Division I only) ==
Records taken from the 2020 UMass Lowell baseball record book.

Season	Coach	Years	Record	Pct.
2014–2023	Ken Harring	10	195–275	.415
2024–present	Nick Barese	1	24–31	.436
Totals	2 coaches	11 seasons	219–306	.417

== Awards and honors (Division I only) ==
- Over their 11 seasons in the America East Conference, 14 different River Hawks have been named to the all-conference first-team.

=== Freshman First-Team All-Americans ===
Year	Position	Name	Selector
2014	OF	Ian Strom	CB
2017	DH	Cam Climo	CB
2021	C	Jimmy Sullivan	CB

=== America East Conference First-Team All-Conference ===
Year	Position	Name
2014	3B	Matt Sanchez
2014	OF	Ian Strom
2015	SS	Danny Mendick
2017	OF	Cam Climo
2017	SP	Andrew Ryan
2018	SP	Andrew Ryan
2018	OF	Russ Olive
2019	SP	Nick Rand
2019	C	Ciaran Devenney
2021	C	Jimmy Sullivan
2022	SP	Joshua Becker
2022	OF	Gerry Siracusa
2023	3B	Robert Gallagher
2024	C	Ryan Proto
2024	OF	Carlos Martinez

Taken from the 2025 America East baseball record book. Updated August 4, 2025.

== River Hawks in Major League Baseball ==
Athlete	Seasons in MLB	MLB teams
Bill Morrell	1926, 1930–1931	Washington Senators, New York Giants
Mike LaValliere	1984–1995	Philadelphia Phillies, St. Louis Cardinals, Pittsburgh Pirates, Chicago White Sox
Matt Tupman	2008	Kansas City Royals
Jack Leathersich	2015, 2017	New York Mets, Chicago Cubs, Pittsburgh Pirates
Danny Mendick	2019–2024	Chicago White Sox, New York Mets

Taken from the 2020 UMass Lowell baseball record book. Updated March 16, 2020.

== See also ==
- List of NCAA Division I baseball programs
