= 2025 NCAA Division I baseball season =

2025 NCAA Division I season

- Duration: February 14 – June 22, 2025
- Number of teams: 303
- Preseason No. 1: Texas A&M

Tournament
- Duration: May 30–June 22, 2025

Men's College World Series
- Champions: LSU (8th title)
- Runners-up: Coastal Carolina
- MOP: Kade Anderson, LSU

Seasons
- ← 2024 2026 →

The 2025 NCAA Division I baseball season was a college baseball season in the United States organized by the National Collegiate Athletic Association (NCAA) at the Division I level. It began on February 14, 2025, with play progressing through the regular season, various conference tournaments and championship series, and concluded with the 2025 NCAA Division I baseball tournament and 2025 Men's College World Series (MCWS). The MCWS, consisted of the eight remaining teams in the NCAA Tournament and held annually in Omaha, Nebraska at Charles Schwab Field Omaha, ended on June 22, 2025, with LSU winning the title.

== Conference realignment ==
Two schools transitioned from NCAA Division II to Division I after the 2024 season.

- Mercyhurst joined the NEC.
- West Georgia joined the ASUN.

A total of 18 baseball-sponsoring schools changed conferences after the 2024 season.

- Arizona, Arizona State, and Utah joined the Big 12 Conference.
- California and Stanford joined the Atlantic Coast Conference.
- Oklahoma and Texas joined the Southeastern Conference.
- Oregon, UCLA, USC, and Washington joined the Big Ten Conference.
- Kennesaw State joined Conference USA.
- Merrimack and Sacred Heart joined the Metro Atlantic Athletic Conference.
- Stephen F. Austin and UT Rio Grande Valley joined the Southland Conference.
- The two remaining members of the Pac-12 Conference, Oregon State and Washington State, respectively became an independent and an associate member of the Mountain West Conference during the Pac-12's effective hiatus.

The 2025 season was the last for six Division I baseball schools in their current conferences.

- Delaware and Missouri State joined Conference USA.
- Grand Canyon joined the Mountain West Conference.
- Seattle joined the West Coast Conference.
- UMass joined the Mid-American Conference.
- Horizon League member Purdue Fort Wayne dropped baseball after the 2025 season.

The 2025 season was also the last for New Haven in the Division II Northeast-10 Conference. The school started a transition to Division I in July 2025 as a new member of the Northeast Conference.

== Other news ==
- March 4 – During the second inning of its 26–6 win over Holy Cross, George Mason set a new Division I record with 23 runs. The previous record of 21 had been shared by three teams — Penn in 1983, Wichita State in 1984, and Valparaiso in 2010.
- The Big West Conference reinstated its postseason tournament to determine the winner of the automatic bid to the NCAA tournament; the conference tournament had not been held since 1998. This shift marked the first time in the NCAA tournament era in which every conference held a postseason tournament to decide its champion.

== Season outlook ==
ESPN/USA Today Coaches
Ranking	Team
1	Texas A&M
2	Tennessee
3	LSU
4	Virginia
5	Arkansas
6	Florida State
7	Oregon State
8	North Carolina
9	Georgia
10	Florida
11	Clemson
12	Duke
13	Texas
14	Oregon
15	Wake Forest
16	NC State
17	Oklahoma State
18	Vanderbilt
19	Mississippi State
20	Arizona
21	Dallas Baptist
22	UC Santa Barbara
23	TCU
24	Kentucky
25	Troyт Oklahomaт

Perfect Game
Ranking	Team
1	Texas A&M
2	LSU
3	Virginia
4	Georgia
5	Tennessee
6	Florida State
7	Texas
8	Clemson
9	Duke
10	Oregon State
11	Florida
12	Arizona
13	Arkansas
14	Oregon
15	Vanderbilt
16	Wake Forest
17	Dallas Baptist
18	TCU
19	North Carolina
20	Oklahoma
21	West Virginia
22	Auburn
23	Coastal Carolina
24	UC Santa Barbara
25	Oklahoma State

D1Baseball
Ranking	Team
1	Texas A&M
2	Virginia
3	LSU
4	Tennessee
5	Arkansas
6	North Carolina
7	Oregon State
8	Georgia
9	Florida State
10	Florida
11	Duke
12	Oregon
13	NC State
14	Wake Forest
15	Clemson
16	Vanderbilt
17	Oklahoma State
18	Mississippi State
19	Texas
20	Dallas Baptist
21	Arizona
22	UC Santa Barbara
23	TCU
24	Nebraska
25	Troy

Baseball America
Ranking	Team
1	Texas A&M
2	LSU
3	Tennessee
4	Arkansas
5	Virginia
6	Florida State
7	Florida
8	Clemson
9	Oregon State
10	Duke
11	Georgia
12	North Carolina
13	Oklahoma State
14	Texas
15	Vanderbilt
16	NC State
17	Wake Forest
18	Mississippi State
19	Oregon
20	Kentucky
21	Dallas Baptist
22	Arizona
23	UC Santa Barbara
24	UC Irvine
25	Indiana

NCBWA
Ranking	Team
1	Texas A&M
2	Tennessee
3	Virginia
4	LSU
5	Arkansas
6	Florida State
7	Oregon State
8	North Carolina
9	Clemson
10	Florida
11	Duke
12	Oregon
13	Georgia
14	Vanderbilt
15	NC Stateт
15	Wake Forestт
17	Texas
18	Oklahoma State
19	Mississippi State
20	Dallas Baptist
21	Arizona
22	UC Santa Barbara
23	TCU
24	Nebraska
25	Indiana

== Final Polls ==
ESPN/USA Today Coaches
Ranking	Team
1	LSU
2	Coastal Carolina
3	Arkansas
4	Oregon State
5	UCLA
6	Louisville
7	Arizona
8	North Carolina
9	Florida State
10	Tennessee
11	Murray State
12	Texas
13	Auburn
14	Vanderbilt
15	Georgia
16	Oregon
17	West Virginia
18	Ole Miss
19	Southern Miss
20	Clemson
21	Duke
22	UTSA
23	UC Irvine
24	Miami (FL)
25	Georgia Tech

Perfect Game
Ranking	Team
1	LSU
2	Coastal Carolina
3	Arkansas
4	Louisville
5	UCLA
6	Oregon State
7	Murray State
8	Arizona
9	North Carolina
10	Florida State
11	Auburn
12	Tennessee
13	UTSA
14	West Virginia
15	Miami (FL)
16	Duke
17	Vanderbilt
18	Texas
19	Georgia
20	Ole Miss
21	Clemson
22	Southern Miss
23	Oregon
24	Georgia Tech
25	UC Irvine

D1Baseball
Ranking	Team
1	LSU
2	Coastal Carolina
3	Arkansas
4	Oregon State
5	UCLA
6	Louisville
7	Arizona
8	Murray State
9	North Carolina
10	Florida State
11	Auburn
12	Tennessee
13	UTSA
14	West Virginia
15	Duke
16	Miami (FL)
17	Texas
18	Vanderbilt
19	Georgia
20	Oregon
21	Ole Miss
22	Southern Miss
23	Clemson
24	Georgia Tech
25	UC Irvine

Baseball America
Ranking	Team
1	LSU
2	Coastal Carolina
3	Arkansas
4	Louisville
5	Oregon State
6	UCLA
7	Arizona
8	Murray State
9	North Carolina
10	Auburn
11	Florida State
12	Tennessee
13	West Virginia
14	Duke
15	UTSA
16	Miami (FL)
17	Vanderbilt
18	Texas
19	Ole Miss
20	Georgia
21	Southern Miss
22	Oregon
23	Florida
24	Clemson
25	Georgia Tech

NCBWA
Ranking	Team
1	LSU
2	Coastal Carolina
3	Arkansas
4	Oregon State
5	Louisville
6	UCLA
7	Arizona
8	Murray State
9	Florida State
10	Tennessee
11	North Carolina
12	West Virginia
13	Auburn
14	UTSA
15	Miami (FL)
16	Duke
17	Texas
18	Vanderbilt
19	Georgia
20	Southern Miss
21	Oregon
22	Clemson
23	Ole Miss
24	Florida
25	Northeastern

== Conference standings ==
2025 America East Conference baseball standings
	Conf.						Overall
Team	W		L		T	PCT	W		L		T	PCT
Bryant ‍†‍‍	18	–	6	–	0	.750	36	–	19	–	1	.652
NJIT ‍‍‍	14	–	10	–	0	.583	27	–	26	–	0	.509
Binghamton ‍‍‡‍^{y}	13	–	11	–	0	.542	29	–	26	–	0	.527
Maine ‍‍‍	13	–	11	–	0	.542	20	–	31	–	0	.392
Albany ‍‍‍	10	–	14	–	0	.417	22	–	32	–	0	.407
UMBC ‍‍‍	8	–	16	–	0	.333	18	–	28	–	0	.391
UMass Lowell ‍‍‍	8	–	16	–	0	.333	18	–	35	–	0	.340
† – Conference champion ‡ – Tournament champion y – Invited to the NCAA tournament As of May 31, 2025; Rankings from D1Baseball

2025 American Athletic Conference baseball standings
	Conf.				Overall
Team	W		L	PCT	W		L	PCT
UTSA ‍†‍‍^{y}	23	–	4	.852	47	–	13	.783
Charlotte ‍‍‍	18	–	9	.667	36	–	22	.621
South Florida ‍‍‍	16	–	11	.593	31	–	25	.554
Florida Atlantic ‍‍‍	15	–	12	.556	37	–	21	.638
Tulane ‍‍‍	13	–	14	.481	33	–	25	.569
East Carolina ‍‍‡‍^{y}	13	–	14	.481	35	–	27	.565
Wichita State ‍‍‍	11	–	16	.407	20	–	36	.357
Rice ‍‍‍	10	–	17	.370	17	–	40	.298
UAB ‍‍‍	8	–	19	.296	24	–	30	.444
Memphis ‍‍‍	8	–	19	.296	22	–	33	.400
† – Conference champion ‡ – Tournament champion y – Invited to the NCAA tournament As of May 31, 2025; Rankings from D1Baseball

2025 Atlantic 10 Conference baseball standings
	Conf.						Overall
Team	W		L		T	PCT	W		L		T	PCT
Rhode Island ‍†‍‡‍^{y}	22	–	8	–	0	.733	38	–	22	–	0	.633
George Mason ‍‍‍	20	–	10	–	0	.667	40	–	21	–	0	.656
Saint Louis ‍‍‍	18	–	12	–	0	.600	33	–	26	–	0	.559
Davidson ‍‍‍	18	–	12	–	0	.600	27	–	29	–	0	.482
Saint Joseph's ‍‍‍	17	–	13	–	0	.567	24	–	28	–	0	.462
Fordham ‍‍‍	15	–	15	–	0	.500	25	–	33	–	0	.431
Dayton ‍‍‍	14	–	16	–	0	.467	27	–	31	–	0	.466
Richmond ‍‍‍	14	–	16	–	0	.467	33	–	19	–	0	.635
George Washington ‍‍‍	14	–	16	–	0	.467	27	–	27	–	0	.500
St. Bonaventure ‍‍‍	11	–	19	–	0	.367	20	–	29	–	0	.408
VCU ‍‍‍	10	–	20	–	0	.333	17	–	37	–	0	.315
UMass ‍‍‍	7	–	24	–	0	.226	14	–	34	–	1	.296
† – Conference champion ‡ – Tournament champion y – Invited to the NCAA tournament As of May 31, 2025; Rankings from D1Baseball

2025 Atlantic Coast Conference baseball standings
	Conf.				Overall
Team	W		L	PCT	W		L	PCT
No. 24 Georgia Tech ‍†‍‍^{y}	19	–	11	.633	41	–	19	.683
No. 10 Florida State ‍‍‍^{y}	17	–	10	.630	41	–	14	.745
No. 9 North Carolina ‍‍‡‍^{y}	18	–	11	.621	46	–	13	.780
NC State ‍‍‍^{y}	17	–	11	.607	35	–	21	.625
No. 23 Clemson ‍‍‍^{y}	18	–	12	.600	45	–	18	.714
Virginia ‍‍‍	16	–	11	.593	32	–	18	.640
No. 15 Duke ‍‍‍^{y}	17	–	13	.567	40	–	19	.678
Wake Forest ‍‍‍^{y}	16	–	14	.533	39	–	22	.639
No. 16 Miami (FL) ‍‍‍^{y}	15	–	14	.517	34	–	26	.567
No. 6 Louisville ‍‍‍^{y}	15	–	15	.500	39	–	21	.650
Notre Dame ‍‍‍	14	–	16	.467	32	–	21	.604
Virginia Tech ‍‍‍	12	–	18	.400	31	–	25	.554
Stanford ‍‍‍	11	–	19	.367	27	–	25	.519
Boston College ‍‍‍	11	–	19	.367	28	–	29	.491
Pittsburgh ‍‍‍	10	–	20	.333	28	–	27	.509
California ‍‍‍	9	–	21	.300	24	–	31	.436
† – Conference champion ‡ – Tournament champion y – Invited to the NCAA Tournament; As of June 23, 2025; Rankings from D1Baseball

2025 ASUN Conference baseball standings
	Conf.						Overall
Team	W		L		T	PCT	W		L		T	PCT
Gold
Austin Peay ^{x}‍‍‍	26	–	4	–	0	.867	45	–	14	–	0	.763
Lipscomb ‍‍‍	17	–	13	–	0	.567	25	–	30	–	0	.455
North Alabama ‍‍‍	16	–	14	–	0	.533	24	–	31	–	0	.436
Central Arkansas ‍‍‍	12	–	18	–	0	.400	20	–	35	–	0	.364
Bellarmine ‍‍‍	11	–	19	–	0	.367	17	–	38	–	0	.309
Eastern Kentucky ‍‍‍	8	–	22	–	0	.267	11	–	44	–	0	.200
Graphite
Stetson ^{x}‍‍‡‍^{y}	24	–	6	–	0	.800	41	–	22	–	0	.651
Jacksonville ‍‍‍	17	–	13	–	0	.567	30	–	26	–	0	.536
Florida Gulf Coast ‍‍‡‍	16	–	14	–	0	.533	31	–	29	–	0	.517
North Florida ‍‍‍	15	–	15	–	0	.500	27	–	29	–	0	.482
West Georgia* ‍‍‍	11	–	19	–	0	.367	20	–	31	–	0	.392
Queens* ‍‍‍	7	–	23	–	0	.233	9	–	44	–	0	.170
x – Division champion ‡ – Tournament champion y – Invited to the NCAA tournament * Ineligible for the 2025 NCAA tournament due to transition from Division II; As of June 1, 2025; Rankings from D1Baseball

2025 Big 12 Conference baseball standings
	Conf.				Overall
Team	W		L	PCT	W		L	PCT
No. 14 West Virginia ‍†‍‍^{y}	19	–	9	.679	44	–	16	.733
Kansas ‍‍‍^{y}	20	–	10	.667	43	–	17	.717
TCU ‍‍‍^{y}	19	–	11	.633	39	–	20	.661
No. 7 Arizona ‍‍‡‍^{y}	18	–	12	.600	44	–	21	.677
Arizona State ‍‍‍^{y}	18	–	12	.600	36	–	24	.600
Kansas State ‍‍‍^{y}	17	–	13	.567	32	–	26	.552
Oklahoma State ‍‍‍^{y}	15	–	12	.556	30	–	25	.545
Cincinnati ‍‍‍^{y}	16	–	14	.533	33	–	26	.559
Texas Tech ‍‍‍	13	–	17	.433	20	–	33	.377
Baylor ‍‍‍	13	–	17	.433	33	–	22	.600
Houston ‍‍‍	12	–	17	.414	30	–	25	.545
BYU ‍‍‍	10	–	20	.333	28	–	27	.509
UCF ‍‍‍	9	–	21	.300	29	–	26	.527
Utah ‍‍‍	8	–	22	.267	21	–	29	.420
† – Conference champion ‡ – Tournament champion y – Invited to the NCAA tournament As of June 23, 2025; Rankings from D1baseball

2025 Big East Conference baseball standings
	Conf.				Overall
Team	W		L	PCT	W		L	PCT
Creighton ‍†‍‡‍^{y}	17	–	4	.810	43	–	16	.729
UConn ‍†‍‍	17	–	4	.810	38	–	21	.644
Xavier ‍‍‍	14	–	7	.667	32	–	27	.542
St. John's ‍‍‍	13	–	8	.619	29	–	24	.547
Seton Hall ‍‍‍	10	–	11	.476	24	–	30	.444
Villanova ‍‍‍	6	–	15	.286	22	–	28	.440
Butler ‍‍‍	4	–	17	.190	15	–	39	.278
Georgetown ‍‍‍	3	–	18	.143	16	–	40	.286
† – Conference champion ‡ – Tournament champion y – Invited to the NCAA tournament As of June 1, 2025; Rankings from D1Baseball

2025 Big South Conference baseball standings
	Conf.						Overall
Team	W		L		T	PCT	W		L		T	PCT
USC Upstate ‍†‍‡‍^{y}	19	–	5	–	0	.792	36	–	25	–	0	.590
High Point ‍‍‍	18	–	6	–	0	.750	39	–	19	–	0	.672
Charleston Southern ‍‍‍	14	–	10	–	0	.583	31	–	22	–	0	.585
Winthrop ‍‍‍	13	–	11	–	0	.542	31	–	29	–	0	.517
Radford ‍‍‍	13	–	11	–	0	.542	28	–	28	–	0	.500
Presbyterian ‍‍‍	9	–	15	–	0	.375	17	–	35	–	0	.327
UNC Asheville ‍‍‍	8	–	16	–	0	.333	15	–	35	–	1	.304
Longwood ‍‍‍	8	–	16	–	0	.333	14	–	38	–	0	.269
Gardner–Webb ‍‍‍	6	–	18	–	0	.250	17	–	36	–	0	.321
† – Conference champion ‡ – Tournament champion y – Invited to the NCAA Tournament; As of May 31, 2025; Rankings from D1Baseball

2025 Big Ten Conference baseball standings
	Conf.						Overall
Team	W		L		T	PCT	W		L		T	PCT
No. 5 Oregon ‍†‍‍^{y}	22	–	8	–	0	.733	42	–	16	–	0	.724
No. 13 UCLA ‍†‍‍^{y}	22	–	8	–	0	.733	48	–	16	–	0	.750
Iowa ‍‍‍	21	–	9	–	0	.700	33	–	22	–	1	.598
USC ‍‍‍^{y}	18	–	12	–	0	.600	37	–	23	–	0	.617
Washington ‍‍‍	17	–	13	–	0	.567	29	–	28	–	0	.509
Indiana ‍‍‍	16	–	14	–	0	.533	32	–	24	–	0	.571
Michigan ‍‍‍	16	–	14	–	0	.533	33	–	23	–	0	.589
Nebraska ‍‍‡‍^{y}	15	–	15	–	0	.500	33	–	29	–	0	.532
Penn State ‍‍‍	15	–	15	–	0	.500	33	–	23	–	0	.589
Rutgers ‍‍‍	15	–	15	–	0	.500	29	–	28	–	0	.509
Illinois ‍‍‍	14	–	16	–	0	.467	30	–	24	–	0	.556
Michigan State ‍‍‍	13	–	17	–	0	.433	28	–	27	–	0	.509
Northwestern ‍‍‍	13	–	17	–	0	.433	25	–	27	–	0	.481
Maryland ‍‍‍	12	–	18	–	0	.400	27	–	29	–	0	.482
Purdue ‍‍‍	11	–	19	–	0	.367	31	–	23	–	0	.574
Minnesota ‍‍‍	10	–	20	–	0	.333	24	–	28	–	0	.462
Ohio State ‍‍‍	5	–	25	–	0	.167	13	–	37	–	0	.260
† – Conference champion ‡ – Tournament champion y – Invited to the NCAA tournament As of June 2, 2025; Rankings from D1Baseball

2025 Big West Conference baseball standings
	Conf.						Overall
Team	W		L		T	PCT	W		L		T	PCT
No. 25 UC Irvine ‍†‍‍^{y}	24	–	6	–	0	.800	43	–	17	–	0	.717
Cal Poly ‍‍‡‍^{y}	23	–	7	–	0	.767	43	–	19	–	0	.694
Cal State Fullerton ‍‍‍	19	–	11	–	0	.633	29	–	27	–	0	.518
UC Santa Barbara ‍‍‍	16	–	14	–	0	.533	36	–	18	–	0	.667
Hawai'i ‍‍‍	16	–	14	–	0	.533	35	–	21	–	0	.625
UC San Diego ‍‍‍	15	–	15	–	0	.500	26	–	25	–	0	.510
Long Beach State ‍‍‍	15	–	15	–	0	.500	22	–	31	–	0	.415
UC Davis ‍‍‍	13	–	17	–	0	.433	27	–	28	–	0	.491
CSUN ‍‍‍	10	–	20	–	0	.333	15	–	34	–	0	.306
Cal State Bakersfield ‍‍‍	9	–	21	–	0	.300	18	–	38	–	0	.321
UC Riverside ‍‍‍	5	–	25	–	0	.167	16	–	36	–	0	.308
† – Conference champion ‡ – Tournament champion y – Invited to the NCAA tournament As of June 23, 2025; Rankings from D1Baseball

2025 Coastal Athletic Association baseball standings
	Conf.				Overall
Team	W		L	PCT	W		L	PCT
No. 19 Northeastern ‍†‍‡‍^{y}	25	–	2	.926	49	–	11	.817
UNCW ‍‍‍	19	–	8	.704	34	–	24	.586
Charleston ‍‍‍	15	–	12	.556	37	–	22	.627
Campbell ‍‍‍	15	–	12	.556	25	–	31	.446
William & Mary ‍‍‍	14	–	13	.519	21	–	35	.375
Elon ‍‍‍	13	–	14	.481	25	–	32	.439
Delaware ‍‍‍	12	–	15	.444	28	–	25	.528
Stony Brook ‍‍‍	11	–	16	.407	25	–	27	.481
Towson ‍‍‍	11	–	16	.407	21	–	35	.375
Monmouth ‍‍‍	10	–	17	.370	24	–	30	.444
North Carolina A&T ‍‍‍	9	–	18	.333	15	–	37	.288
Hofstra ‍‍‍	8	–	19	.296	18	–	36	.333
† – Conference champion ‡ – Tournament champion y – Invited to the NCAA Tournament; As of June 1, 2025; Rankings from D1Baseball

2025 Conference USA baseball standings
	Conf.				Overall
Team	W		L	PCT	W		L	PCT
No. 20 Dallas Baptist ‍†‍‍^{y}	21	–	6	.778	41	–	18	.695
Western Kentucky ‍‍‡‍^{y}	18	–	9	.667	46	–	14	.767
Kennesaw State ‍‍‍	17	–	9	.654	31	–	27	.534
Jacksonville State ‍‍‍	15	–	12	.556	37	–	25	.597
Louisiana Tech ‍‍‍	14	–	12	.538	32	–	25	.561
FIU ‍‍‍	13	–	13	.500	31	–	27	.534
New Mexico State ‍‍‍	11	–	15	.423	23	–	33	.411
Liberty ‍‍‍	10	–	17	.370	30	–	27	.526
Middle Tennessee ‍‍‍	8	–	19	.296	23	–	32	.418
Sam Houston ‍‍‍	6	–	21	.222	12	–	43	.218
† – Conference champion ‡ – Tournament champion y – Invited to the NCAA Tournament; As of June 1, 2025; Rankings from D1Baseball

2025 Horizon League baseball standings
	Conf.				Overall
Team	W		L	PCT	W		L	PCT
Wright State ‍†‍‡‍^{y}	25	–	5	.833	40	–	21	.656
Northern Kentucky ‍‍‍	18	–	12	.600	31	–	25	.554
Milwaukee ‍‍‍	16	–	13	.552	24	–	35	.407
Youngstown State ‍‍‍	11	–	19	.367	15	–	42	.263
Oakland ‍‍‍	10	–	20	.333	19	–	41	.317
Purdue Fort Wayne ‍‍‍	9	–	20	.310	11	–	42	.208
† – Conference champion ‡ – Tournament champion y – Invited to the NCAA Tournament; As of June 1, 2025; Rankings from D1Baseball

2025 NCAA Division I baseball independents standings
	Conf.						Overall
Team	W		L		T	PCT	W		L		T	PCT
No. 4 Oregon State ‍‍‍^{y}	0	–	0	–	0	–	48	–	16	–	1	.746
y – Invited to the NCAA tournament As of June 23, 2025; Rankings from D1Baseball

2025 Ivy League baseball standings
	Conf.				Overall
Team	W		L	PCT	W		L	PCT
Yale ‍†‍‍	16	–	5	.762	31	–	14	.689
Columbia ‍†‍‡‍^{y}	16	–	5	.762	30	–	19	.612
Penn ‍‍‍	13	–	8	.619	21	–	20	.512
Harvard ‍‍‍	9	–	12	.429	14	–	28	.333
Dartmouth ‍‍‍	8	–	13	.381	11	–	25	.306
Princeton ‍‍‍	8	–	13	.381	12	–	31	.279
Cornell ‍‍‍	7	–	14	.333	12	–	22	.353
Brown ‍‍‍	7	–	14	.333	11	–	28	.282
† – Conference champion ‡ – Tournament champion y – Invited to the NCAA Tournament; As of June 1, 2025; Rankings from D1Baseball

2025 Metro Atlantic Athletic Conference baseball standings
	Conf.						Overall
Team	W		L		T	PCT	W		L		T	PCT
Rider ‍†‍‍	22	–	6	–	0	.786	34	–	18	–	0	.654
Fairfield ‍‍‡‍^{y}	21	–	8	–	0	.724	39	–	19	–	0	.672
Sacred Heart ‍‍‍	17	–	13	–	0	.567	28	–	26	–	0	.519
Siena ‍‍‍	17	–	13	–	0	.567	22	–	32	–	0	.407
Quinnipiac ‍‍‍	17	–	13	–	0	.567	29	–	26	–	1	.527
Mount St. Mary's ‍‍‍	15	–	13	–	0	.536	23	–	28	–	0	.451
Marist ‍‍‍	14	–	14	–	0	.500	26	–	28	–	0	.481
Niagara ‍‍‍	14	–	16	–	0	.467	19	–	27	–	0	.413
Manhattan ‍‍‍	12	–	15	–	0	.444	20	–	28	–	0	.417
Iona ‍‍‍	13	–	17	–	0	.433	19	–	33	–	0	.365
Merrimack ‍‍‍	11	–	19	–	0	.367	16	–	34	–	1	.324
Canisius ‍‍‍	10	–	19	–	0	.345	14	–	31	–	0	.311
Saint Peter's ‍‍‍	5	–	24	–	0	.172	11	–	37	–	0	.229
† – Conference champion ‡ – Tournament champion y – Invited to the NCAA Tournament; As of May 31, 2025; Rankings from D1Baseball

2025 Mid-American Conference baseball standings
	Conf.				Overall
Team	W		L	PCT	W		L	PCT
Kent State ‍†‍‍	23	–	7	.767	38	–	18	.679
Miami (OH) ‍‍‡‍^{y}	23	–	7	.767	35	–	23	.603
Ball State ‍‍‍	21	–	9	.700	36	–	22	.621
Bowling Green ‍‍‍	19	–	11	.633	33	–	22	.600
Toledo ‍‍‍	17	–	13	.567	32	–	29	.525
Eastern Michigan ‍‍‍	12	–	18	.400	21	–	30	.412
Western Michigan ‍‍‍	12	–	18	.400	19	–	32	.373
Central Michigan ‍‍‍	11	–	19	.367	20	–	35	.364
Northern Illinois ‍‍‍	9	–	21	.300	21	–	33	.389
Akron ‍‍‍	9	–	21	.300	20	–	34	.370
Ohio ‍‍‍	9	–	21	.300	14	–	37	.275
† – Conference champion ‡ – Tournament champion y – Invited to the NCAA Tournament; As of May 31, 2025; Rankings from D1Baseball

2025 Missouri Valley Conference baseball standings
	Conf.				Overall
Team	W		L	PCT	W		L	PCT
Murray State ‍†‍‡‍^{y}	17	–	8	.680	42	–	14	.750
Missouri State ‍†‍‍	17	–	8	.680	30	–	25	.545
Southern Illinois ‍‍‍	16	–	11	.593	37	–	20	.649
UIC ‍‍‍	16	–	11	.593	22	–	33	.400
Illinois State ‍‍‍	15	–	12	.556	28	–	28	.500
Belmont ‍‍‍	13	–	14	.481	26	–	34	.433
Indiana State ‍‍‍	12	–	15	.444	24	–	31	.436
Bradley ‍‍‍	12	–	15	.444	16	–	35	.314
Evansville ‍‍‍	10	–	17	.370	17	–	37	.315
Valparaiso ‍‍‍	5	–	22	.185	10	–	40	.200
† – Conference champion ‡ – Tournament champion y – Invited to the NCAA Tournament; As of June 2, 2025; Rankings from D1Baseball

2025 Mountain West Conference baseball standings
	Conf.				Overall
Team	W		L	PCT	W		L	PCT
Nevada ‍†‍‍	19	–	11	.633	34	–	23	.596
Fresno State ‍‍‡‍^{y}	18	–	12	.600	31	–	29	.517
New Mexico ‍‍‍	17	–	13	.567	30	–	23	.566
UNLV ‍‍‍	16	–	14	.533	31	–	23	.574
San Diego State ‍‍‍	14	–	16	.467	20	–	39	.339
San Jose State ‍‍‍	13	–	17	.433	29	–	30	.492
Air Force ‍‍‍	12	–	18	.400	20	–	34	.370
Washington State ‍‍‍	11	–	19	.367	18	–	36	.333
† – Conference champion ‡ – Tournament champion y – Invited to the NCAA Tournament; As of May 31, 2025; Rankings from D1Baseball

2025 Northeast Conference baseball standings
	Conf.				Overall
Team	W		L	PCT	W		L	PCT
LIU ‍†‍‍	24	–	6	.800	35	–	23	.603
Central Connecticut ‍‍‡‍^{y}	23	–	7	.767	31	–	17	.646
Wagner ‍‍‍	23	–	7	.767	31	–	22	.585
Stonehill ‍‍‍	18	–	12	.600	20	–	32	.385
Le Moyne ‍‍‍	17	–	13	.567	20	–	28	.417
Fairleigh Dickinson ‍‍‍	16	–	14	.533	16	–	37	.302
Mercyhurst ‍‍‍	15	–	15	.500	17	–	35	.327
Coppin State ‍‍‍	13	–	17	.433	15	–	34	.306
Delaware State ‍‍‍	6	–	24	.200	7	–	34	.171
Maryland Eastern Shore ‍‍‍	6	–	24	.200	7	–	41	.146
Norfolk State ‍‍‍	4	–	26	.133	4	–	38	.095
† – Conference champion ‡ – Tournament champion y – Invited to the NCAA Tournament; As of May 31, 2025; Rankings from D1Baseball

2025 Ohio Valley Conference baseball standings
	Conf.				Overall
Team	W		L	PCT	W		L	PCT
Eastern Illinois ‍†‍‍	17	–	7	.708	31	–	22	.585
SIU Edwardsville ‍‍‍	18	–	8	.692	26	–	28	.481
Tennessee Tech ‍‍‍	18	–	9	.667	37	–	20	.649
Southeast Missouri State ‍‍‍	16	–	11	.593	30	–	25	.545
Southern Indiana ‍‍‍	15	–	12	.556	27	–	29	.482
Lindenwood ‍‍‍	14	–	12	.538	30	–	30	.500
UT Martin ‍‍‍	11	–	14	.440	20	–	34	.370
Little Rock ‍‍‡‍^{y}	8	–	16	.333	27	–	34	.443
Western Illinois ‍‍‍	9	–	18	.333	18	–	32	.360
Morehead State ‍‍‍	4	–	23	.148	14	–	39	.264
† – Conference champion ‡ – Tournament champion y – Invited to the NCAA Tournament; As of June 2, 2025; Rankings from D1Baseball

2025 Patriot League baseball standings
	Conf.				Overall
Team	W		L	PCT	W		L	PCT
Holy Cross ‍†‍‡‍^{y}	17	–	8	.680	31	–	27	.534
Navy ‍‍‍	14	–	11	.560	26	–	25	.510
Army ‍‍‍	14	–	11	.560	25	–	25	.500
Lehigh ‍‍‍	11	–	14	.440	24	–	26	.480
Bucknell ‍‍‍	10	–	15	.400	18	–	27	.400
Lafayette ‍‍‍	9	–	16	.360	14	–	35	.286
† – Conference champion ‡ – Tournament champion y – Invited to the NCAA Tournament; As of May 31, 2025; Rankings from D1Baseball

2025 Southeastern Conference baseball standings
	Conf.				Overall
Team	W		L	PCT	W		L	PCT
No. 17 Texas ‍†‍‍^{y}	22	–	8	.733	44	–	14	.759
No. 3 Arkansas ‍‍‍^{y}	20	–	10	.667	50	–	15	.769
No. 1 LSU ‍‍‍^{y}	19	–	11	.633	53	–	15	.779
No. 18 Vanderbilt ‍‍‡‍^{y}	19	–	11	.633	43	–	18	.705
No. 19 Georgia ‍‍‍^{y}	18	–	12	.600	43	–	17	.717
No. 11 Auburn ‍‍‍^{y}	17	–	13	.567	41	–	20	.672
No. 21 Ole Miss ‍‍‍^{y}	16	–	14	.533	43	–	21	.672
No. 12 Tennessee ‍‍‍^{y}	16	–	14	.533	46	–	19	.708
Alabama ‍‍‍^{y}	16	–	14	.533	41	–	18	.695
Florida ‍‍‍^{y}	15	–	15	.500	39	–	22	.639
Mississippi State ‍‍‍^{y}	15	–	15	.500	36	–	23	.610
Oklahoma ‍‍‍^{y}	14	–	16	.467	38	–	22	.633
Kentucky ‍‍‍^{y}	13	–	17	.433	31	–	26	.544
Texas A&M ‍‍‍	11	–	19	.367	30	–	26	.536
South Carolina ‍‍‍	6	–	24	.200	28	–	29	.491
Missouri ‍‍‍	3	–	27	.100	16	–	39	.291
† – Conference champion ‡ – Tournament champion y – Invited to the NCAA Tournament; As of June 22, 2025; Rankings from D1Baseball

2025 Southern Conference baseball standings
	Conf.				Overall
Team	W		L	PCT	W		L	PCT
East Tennessee State ‍†‍‡‍^{y}	14	–	7	.667	41	–	17	.707
Samford ‍‍‍	13	–	8	.619	30	–	27	.526
The Citadel ‍‍‍	12	–	9	.571	31	–	26	.544
Mercer ‍‍‍	12	–	9	.571	35	–	25	.583
Western Carolina ‍‍‍	10	–	11	.476	30	–	28	.517
UNC Greensboro ‍‍‍	9	–	12	.429	21	–	33	.389
Wofford ‍‍‍	8	–	13	.381	33	–	27	.550
VMI ‍‍‍	6	–	15	.286	27	–	26	.509
† – Conference champion ‡ – Tournament champion y – Invited to the NCAA tournament As of May 31, 2025; Rankings from D1Baseball

2025 Southland Conference baseball standings
	Conf.				Overall
Team	W		L	PCT	W		L	PCT
Southeastern Louisiana ‍†‍‍	22	–	8	.733	38	–	16	.704
UT Rio Grande Valley ‍†‍‍	22	–	8	.733	36	–	18	.667
Lamar ‍‍‍	20	–	10	.667	40	–	17	.702
McNeese ‍‍‍	19	–	11	.633	31	–	17	.646
Northwestern State ‍‍‍	19	–	11	.633	35	–	21	.625
Houston Christian ‍‍‡‍^{y}	17	–	13	.567	32	–	25	.561
New Orleans ‍‍‍	12	–	18	.400	28	–	26	.519
Texas A&M–Corpus Christi ‍‍‍	12	–	18	.400	21	–	31	.404
Nicholls ‍‍‍	10	–	20	.333	17	–	32	.347
Stephen F. Austin ‍‍‍	9	–	21	.300	18	–	31	.367
Incarnate Word ‍‍‍	3	–	27	.100	17	–	33	.340
† – Conference champion ‡ – Tournament champion y – Invited to the NCAA Tournament; As of May 31, 2025; Rankings from D1Baseball

2025 Southwestern Athletic Conference baseball standings
	Conf.				Overall
Team	W		L	PCT	W		L	PCT
Bethune–Cookman ‍†‍‡‍^{y}	24	–	5	.828	37	–	23	.617
Florida A&M ‍‍‍	24	–	6	.800	33	–	25	.569
Alabama State ‍‍‍	21	–	9	.700	31	–	29	.517
Arkansas–Pine Bluff ‍‍‍	17	–	9	.654	19	–	34	.358
Grambling State ‍‍‍	18	–	11	.621	26	–	28	.481
Jackson State ‍‍‍	16	–	12	.571	29	–	21	.580
Southern ‍‍‍	15	–	13	.536	24	–	27	.471
Texas Southern ‍‍‍	15	–	15	.500	22	–	32	.407
Prairie View A&M ‍‍‍	13	–	14	.481	17	–	36	.321
Mississippi Valley State ‍‍‍	7	–	23	.233	12	–	29	.293
Alabama A&M ‍‍‍	2	–	27	.069	10	–	40	.200
Alcorn State ‍‍‍	1	–	29	.033	6	–	43	.122
† – Conference champion ‡ – Tournament champion y – Invited to the NCAA Tournament; As of May 31, 2025; Rankings from D1Baseball

2025 Summit League baseball standings
	Conf.				Overall
Team	W		L	PCT	W		L	PCT
Oral Roberts ‍†‍‍	21	–	9	.700	37	–	22	.627
St. Thomas* ‍†‍‍	21	–	9	.700	29	–	21	.580
North Dakota State ‍‍‡‍^{y}	13	–	15	.464	21	–	34	.382
Omaha ‍‍‍	12	–	16	.429	20	–	30	.400
South Dakota State ‍‍‍	12	–	18	.400	16	–	36	.308
Northern Colorado ‍‍‍	9	–	21	.300	18	–	33	.353
† – Conference champion ‡ – Tournament champion y – Invited to the NCAA Tournament * Ineligible for the 2025 NCAA tournament due to transition from Division III; Rankings from D1Baseball

2025 Sun Belt Conference baseball standings
	Conf.				Overall
Team	W		L	PCT	W		L	PCT
No. 11 Coastal Carolina ‍†‍‡‍^{y}	26	–	4	.867	51	–	11	.823
No. 12 Southern Miss ‍‍‍^{y}	24	–	6	.800	47	–	16	.746
Troy ‍‍‍	18	–	12	.600	39	–	21	.650
Marshall ‍‍‍	16	–	14	.533	33	–	26	.559
Louisiana ‍‍‍	16	–	14	.533	27	–	31	.466
Old Dominion ‍‍‍	15	–	15	.500	22	–	31	.415
Arkansas State ‍‍‍	14	–	16	.467	26	–	28	.481
Texas State ‍‍‍	14	–	16	.467	27	–	31	.466
Georgia Southern ‍‍‍	13	–	17	.433	28	–	31	.475
Appalachian State ‍‍‍	13	–	17	.433	23	–	31	.426
South Alabama ‍‍‍	12	–	18	.400	23	–	28	.451
Georgia State ‍‍‍	11	–	19	.367	26	–	30	.464
James Madison ‍‍‍	10	–	20	.333	17	–	38	.309
Louisiana–Monroe ‍‍‍	8	–	22	.267	22	–	33	.400
† – Conference champion ‡ – Tournament champion y – Invited to the NCAA Tournament; As of June 1, 2025; Rankings from D1Baseball

2025 West Coast Conference baseball standings
	Conf.				Overall
Team	W		L	PCT	W		L	PCT
San Diego ‍†‍‍	19	–	5	.792	28	–	30	.483
Gonzaga ‍‍‍	16	–	8	.667	26	–	27	.491
Saint Mary's ‍‍‡‍^{y}	15	–	9	.625	36	–	26	.581
Loyola Marymount ‍‍‍	14	–	10	.583	29	–	29	.500
Portland ‍‍‍	13	–	11	.542	22	–	30	.423
San Francisco ‍‍‍	9	–	15	.375	26	–	30	.464
Pacific ‍‍‍	8	–	16	.333	20	–	36	.357
Santa Clara ‍‍‍	7	–	17	.292	20	–	30	.400
Pepperdine ‍‍‍	7	–	17	.292	12	–	42	.222
† – Conference champion ‡ – Tournament champion y – Invited to the NCAA Tournament; As of June 1, 2025; Rankings from D1Baseball

2025 Western Athletic Conference baseball standings
	Conf.				Overall
Team	W		L	PCT	W		L	PCT
Sacramento State ‍†‍‍	15	–	9	.625	32	–	26	.552
Abilene Christian ‍†‍‍	15	–	9	.625	34	–	23	.596
Utah Valley ‍‍‡‍^{y}	13	–	11	.542	33	–	29	.532
Grand Canyon ‍‍‍	13	–	11	.542	31	–	27	.534
California Baptist ‍‍‍	12	–	12	.500	30	–	27	.526
Tarleton ‍‍‍	12	–	12	.500	24	–	32	.429
UT Arlington ‍‍‍	11	–	13	.458	21	–	33	.389
Utah Tech ‍‍‍	9	–	15	.375	24	–	31	.436
Seattle ‍‍‍	8	–	16	.333	20	–	32	.385
† – Conference champion ‡ – Tournament champion y – Invited to the NCAA Tournament; As of June 1, 2025; Rankings from D1Baseball

=== Conference winners and tournaments ===
Twenty-nine athletic conferences each end their regular seasons with a single-elimination tournament or a double-elimination tournament. The teams in each conference that win their regular season title are given the number one seed in each tournament. The winners of these tournaments receive automatic invitations to the 2025 NCAA Division I baseball tournament.

Conference	Regular Season Winner	Conference Player of the Year	Conference Pitcher of the Year	Conference Coach of the Year	Conference Tournament	Tournament Venue (City)	Tournament Winner
America East Conference	Bryant	Drew Wyers, Bryant	Caleb Leys, Maine	Ryan Klosterman, Bryant	2025 America East Conference baseball tournament	Mahaney Diamond • Orono, ME	Binghamton
American Athletic Conference	UTSA	Mason Lytle, UTSA	Blake Gillespie, Charlotte	Patrick Hallmark, UTSA	2025 American Athletic Conference baseball tournament	BayCare Ballpark • Clearwater, FL	East Carolina
Atlantic 10 Conference	Rhode Island	James Quinn-Irons, George Mason	Colton Book, Saint Joseph's	Raphael Cerrato, Rhode Island	2025 Atlantic 10 Conference baseball tournament	Capital One Park • Tysons, VA	Rhode Island
Atlantic Coast Conference	Georgia Tech	Alex Lodise, Florida State	Jake Knapp, North Carolina	Danny Hall, Georgia Tech	2025 Atlantic Coast Conference baseball tournament	Durham Bulls Athletic Park • Durham, NC	North Carolina
Atlantic Sun Conference	Gold – Austin Peay; Graphite – Stetson	Cameron Nickens, Austin Peay	Jonathan Gonzalez, Stetson	Roland Fanning, Austin Peay	2025 ASUN Conference baseball tournament	Melching Field at Conrad Park • DeLand, FL	Florida Gulf Coast & Stetson (Note: The first game of the ASUN tournament championship game between Stetson and FGCU was called after 7 innings due to inclement weather, with FGCU being declared the winner, which would have forced a 2nd game to be played. As a result, the rest of the tournament was canceled and both FGCU and Stetson were declared conference tournament co-champions, with Stetson getting the automatic NCAA tournament berth per conference policy.)
Big 12 Conference	West Virginia	Kerrington Cross, Cincinnati	Antoine Jean, Houston	Dan Fitzgerald, Kansas	2025 Big 12 Conference baseball tournament	Globe Life Field • Arlington, TX	Arizona
Big East Conference	UConn & Creighton (Note: Top seed in conference tournament.)	Ryan Daniels, UConn	Dominic Cancellieri, Creighton	Creighton (Note: The Big East's end-of-season coaching award is officially styled as the "Coaching Staff of the Year" award and is presented to the entire honored staff. The head coach is specifically named in the award announcement.)	2025 Big East Conference baseball tournament	Prasco Park • Mason, OH	Creighton
Big South Conference	USC Upstate	Konni Durschlag, High Point	Clay Edmondson, UNC Asheville	Kane Sweeney, USC Upstate	2025 Big South Conference baseball tournament	CofC Baseball Stadium at Patriots Point • Mount Pleasant, SC	USC Upstate
Big Ten Conference	Oregon & UCLA	Roch Cholowsky, UCLA	Joseph Dzierwa, Michigan State	Mark Wasikowski, Oregon	2025 Big Ten baseball tournament	Charles Schwab Field Omaha • Omaha, NE	Nebraska
Big West Conference	UC Irvine	Colin Yeaman, UC Irvine	Ricky Ojeda, UC Irvine	Ben Orloff, UC Irvine	2025 Big West Conference baseball tournament	Goodwin Field • Fullerton, CA	Cal Poly
Coastal Athletic Association	Northeastern	Harrison Feinberg, Northeastern & Ben Parker, William & Mary	Zane Taylor, UNC Wilmington	Mike Glavine, Northeastern	2025 Coastal Athletic Association baseball tournament	Brooks Field • Wilmington, NC	Northeastern
Conference USA	Dallas Baptist	Ryan Wideman, Western Kentucky	Drew Whalen, Western Kentucky	Marc Rardin, Western Kentucky	2025 Conference USA baseball tournament	Liberty Baseball Stadium • Lynchburg, VA	Western Kentucky
Horizon League	Wright State	Kyle Fossum, Youngstown State	Gavin Theis, Milwaukee	Alex Sogard, Wright State	2025 Horizon League baseball tournament	Nischwitz Stadium • Fairborn, OH	Wright State
Ivy League	Columbia & Yale	Sam Miller, Columbia	Jack Ohman, Yale	Yale (Note: The Ivy League's end-of-season coaching award is officially styled as the "Coaching Staff of the Year" award and is presented to the entire honored staff.)	2025 Ivy League baseball tournament	Campus Sites	Columbia
Metro Atlantic Athletic Conference	Rider	Joe Tiroly, Rider	Brian Young, Rider	Lee Lipinski, Rider	2025 Metro Atlantic Athletic Conference baseball tournament	Clover Stadium • Pomona, NY	Fairfield
Mid-American Conference	Kent State & Miami (OH)	Hayden Jatczak, Kent State	Cooper Katskee, Miami (OH)	Brian Smiley, Miami (OH)	2025 Mid-American Conference baseball tournament	Mercy Health Stadium • Avon, OH	Miami (OH)
Missouri Valley Conference	Murray State & Missouri State	Nick Rodriguez, Missouri State	Joe Ruzicka, Belmont	Dan Skirka, Murray State	2025 Missouri Valley Conference baseball tournament	Duffy Bass Field • Normal, IL	Murray State
Mountain West Conference	Nevada	Murf Gray, Fresno State & Dean Toigo, UNLV	Aidan Cremarosa, Fresno State	Jake McKinley, Nevada	2025 Mountain West Conference baseball tournament	Sloan Park • Mesa, AZ	Fresno State
Northeast Conference	LIU	Aidan Redahan, Central Connecticut	Garrett Yawn, LIU	Charlie Hickey, Central Connecticut	2025 Northeast Conference baseball tournament	Heritage Financial Park • Fishkill, NY	Central Connecticut
Ohio Valley Conference	Eastern Illinois	Mack Whitcomb, Tennessee Tech	Josh Newell, Lindenwood	Jason Anderson, Eastern Illinois	2025 Ohio Valley Conference baseball tournament	Marion Stadium • Marion, IL	Little Rock
Patriot League	Holy Cross	CJ Egrie, Holy Cross	Jaden Wywoda, Holy Cross	Ed Kahovec, Holy Cross	2025 Patriot League baseball tournament	Campus Sites	Holy Cross
Southeastern Conference	Texas	Wehiwa Aloy, Arkansas	Liam Doyle, Tennessee	Jim Schlossnagle, Texas	2025 Southeastern Conference baseball tournament	Hoover Metropolitan Stadium • Hoover, AL	Vanderbilt
Southern Conference	East Tennessee State	Cooper Torres, ETSU	Brady Frederick, ETSU	Joe Pennucci, ETSU	2025 Southern Conference baseball tournament	Fluor Field at the West End • Greenville, SC	East Tennessee State
Southland Conference	Southeastern Louisiana & UTRGV	Armani Raygoza, UTRGV	Brennan Stuprich, Southeastern Louisiana	Bobby Barbier, Southeastern Louisiana	2025 Southland Conference baseball tournament	Campus Sites	Houston Christian
Southwestern Athletic Conference	Bethune–Cookman	Cardell Thibodeaux, Southern	Eric Elliott, Jackson State	Jonathan Hernandez, Bethune–Cookman	2025 Southwestern Athletic Conference baseball tournament	Rickwood Field • Birmingham, AL	Bethune–Cookman
Summit League	Oral Roberts & St. Thomas (Note: St. Thomas ineligible due to transition from NCAA Division III, Oral Roberts top seed in tournament)	Henry Zipay, Omaha	Nolan Johnson, North Dakota State	Ryan Folmar, Oral Roberts	2025 Summit League baseball tournament	Tal Anderson Field • Omaha, NE	North Dakota State
Sun Belt Conference	Coastal Carolina	Nick Monistere, Southern Miss	Jacob Morrison, Coastal Carolina	Kevin Schnall, Coastal Carolina	2025 Sun Belt Conference baseball tournament	Montgomery Riverwalk Stadium • Montgomery, AL	Coastal Carolina
West Coast Conference	San Diego	Mikey Bell, Gonzaga	Cal Scolari, San Diego	Brock Ungricht, San Diego	2025 West Coast Conference baseball tournament	Las Vegas Ballpark • Las Vegas, NV	Saint Mary's
Western Athletic Conference	Sacramento State & Abilene Christian	Nick Dumesnil, California Baptist	Evan Gibbons, Sacramento State	Reggie Christiansen, Sacramento State	2025 Western Athletic Conference baseball tournament	Hohokam Stadium • Mesa, AZ	Utah Valley

== Award winners ==
Award	Player	Position	School
Golden Spikes Award	Wehiwa Aloy	SS	Arkansas
Dick Howser Trophy	Alex Lodise	SS	Florida State
Bobby Bragan Collegiate Slugger Award	Dylan Crews	OF	LSU
Baseball America College Player of the Year Award	Roch Cholowsky	SS	UCLA
National Pitcher of the Year Award	Jake Knapp	P	North Carolina
Buster Posey Award	Caden Bodine	C	Coastal Carolina
Brooks Wallace Award	Roch Cholowsky	SS	UCLA
John Olerud Award	Evan Dempsey	/P	Florida Gulf Coast
Stopper of the Year Award	Tony Pluta	RP	Arizona
Tony Gwynn Community Service Award	Chris Stanfield	OF	LSU
College World Series Most Outstanding Player	Kade Anderson	SP	LSU

== Coaching changes ==
This table lists programs that changed head coaches at any point from the first day of the 2025 season until the day before the first day of the 2026 season.

Team	Former coach	Interim coach	New coach	Reason
Bradley	Elvis Dominguez	—N/a	Justin Dedman	Retired
Brown	Grant Achilles	—N/a	Frank Holbrook	Fired
Creighton	Ed Servais	—N/a	Mark Kingston	Retiring at end of season
Dartmouth	Bob Whalen	Blake McFadden		Retired
Dayton	Scott Loiseau	—N/a	Jayson King	Resigned
Duke	Chris Pollard	—N/a	Corey Muscara	Became head coach at Virginia
Eastern Kentucky	Walt Jones	—N/a	Jan Weisberg	Fired
Eastern Michigan	Robbie Britt	Trevor Beerman		Became field coordinator for Boston Red Sox
Georgia Tech	Danny Hall	—N/a	James Ramsey	Stepping down at end of season
Incarnate Word	Ryan Shotzberger	—N/a	Nick Zaleski	Fired
Louisiana–Monroe	Michael Federico	—N/a	Ford Pemberton	Stepped down
Mississippi State	Chris Lemonis	Justin Parker	Brian O'Connor	Fired
Nevada	Jake McKinley	—N/a	Jordan Getzelman	Became field coordinator for Seattle Mariners
Norfolk State	Keith Shumate	—N/a	Merrill Morgan	Stepped down
Ohio	Craig Moore	—N/a	Andrew See	Contract not renewed
Prairie View A&M	Auntwan Riggins	—N/a	Daniel Dulin	Departed from position
Rice	José Cruz Jr.	Parker Bangs	David Pierce	Fired
Saint Louis	Darin Hendrickson	Miles Miller		Fired
Saint Peter's	Grant Neary	—N/a	TJ Ward	Resigned
San Diego State	Shaun Cole	—N/a	Kevin Vance	Fired
Stonehill	Patrick Boen	—N/a	Sean Callahan	Retired
Stony Brook	Matt Senk	—N/a	Jim Martin	Retiring at end of season
Tennessee	Tony Vitello	—N/a	Josh Elander	Became manager of the San Francisco Giants
UMass	Matt Reynolds	Brandon Shileikis & Max Weir	Max Weir	Became head coach at Division III Wesleyan University
UNC Asheville	Scott Friedholm	Alex Raburn		Resigned
Virginia	Brian O'Connor	—N/a	Chris Pollard	Became head coach at Mississippi State

== See also ==
- 2025 NCAA Division I softball season
