= Craig Moore (disambiguation) =

Craig Moore (born 1975) is an Australian soccer player.

Craig Moore may also refer to:

- Craig Moore (footballer, born 1994), Scottish footballer (Motherwell FC)
- Craig Moore (footballer, born 2005), Scottish footballer (Dundee United FC)
- Craig Moore (basketball) (born 1987), American basketball player
- Craig Moore (baseball), American baseball coach and shortstop
- Craig Moore (politician), American politician
