= Riggins (surname) =

Riggins is an Anglicized form of the Irish surname Ó Riagáin ("son of Riagán") derived from the Irish personal name Riagán, which means "little king".

== People ==
- Auntwan Riggins (born 1976), American college baseball coach
- Bill Riggins (1900–1943), American baseball player
- Charles Riggins (born 1959), American football player
- David Riggins, American murderer and subject of Riggins v. Nevada
- John Riggins (born 1949), American football player
- J.R. Riggins, American politician
- Karriem Riggins (born 1975), American jazz drummer
- Mark Riggins (born 1957), American baseball coach
- Quentin Riggins (born 1966), American football player
- Reno Riggins (born 1967), American professional wrestler

== Fictional ==
- Tim Riggins, character on Friday Night Lights television series

== See also ==
- Riggins (disambiguation)
- Riggin
