= Riggins =

Riggins may refer to:

- Riggins, Idaho, a city in Idaho County, Idaho, United States
- Riggins, Mississippi, an unincorporated community in Monroe County, Mississippi, United States
- Riggins Motel, a historical hotel building in Idaho, United States
- Riggins Lake, a lake in Michigan, United States
- Riggins (surname)

== See also ==
- Riggin
