= 2026 Patriot League baseball tournament =

- Teams: 4
- Format: Best-of-three series
- Finals site: Eugene B. Depew Field; Lewisburg, Pennsylvania
- Champions: Holy Cross (3rd title)
- Winning coach: Ed Kahovec (2nd title)
- MVP: Jaden Wywoda (Holy Cross)
- Television: ESPN+

2026 Patriot League baseball standings
	Conf.				Overall
Team	W		L	PCT	W		L	PCT
Army ‍†‍‍	17	–	9	.654	28	–	20	.583
Bucknell ‍†‍‍	17	–	9	.654	28	–	23	.549
Navy ‍‍‍	16	–	10	.615	30	–	19	.612
Holy Cross ‍‍‡‍^{y}	13	–	13	.500	25	–	28	.472
Lehigh ‍‍‍	8	–	18	.308	14	–	31	.311
Lafayette ‍‍‍	7	–	19	.269	12	–	33	.267
† – Conference champion ‡ – Tournament champion y – Invited to the NCAA Tournament; As of May 20, 2026; Rankings from D1Baseball

The 2026 Patriot League baseball tournament took place on consecutive weekends, with the semifinals held on May 9–11 and the finals on May 18–20. The higher seeded teams, Army and Bucknell, hosted the semifinals. Bucknell is hosting the finals series. Holy Cross won the conference's automatic bid to the 2026 NCAA Division I baseball tournament.

== Seeding and format ==
The top four finishers from the regular season are seeded one through four, with the top seed hosting the fourth seed and second seed hosting the third. The higher seeded team was designated as the home team for each game of the series.

Seed	School	Conference	Tie-breaker #1
1	Army	17–9	3–1 vs Bucknell
2	Bucknell	17–9	1–3 vs Army
3	Navy	16–10	
4	Holy Cross	13–13	

Note: Lehigh and Lafayette failed to qualify. American, Boston University, Colgate, and Loyola-Maryland do not sponsor a baseball team.

== Bracket ==
Semifinals
1	Army	3	2	–
4	Holy Cross	5	6	–
2	Bucknell	16	6	–
3	Navy	4	4	–

Championship
4	Holy Cross	11	5	14
2	Bucknell	2	9	11

== Results ==
=== Semifinal Series ===
==== #4 Holy Cross at #1 Army ====
May 9, 2026 6:30 PM at Doubleday Field Game 1
Team	1	2	3	4	5	6	7	8	9	R	H	E
Holy Cross	0	0	0	0	1	0	2	1	1	5	8	2
Army	0	0	1	0	0	1	1	0	0	3	8	2
WP: Thomas Skrobe (3–1) LP: Andrew Berg (6–3); Home runs: Holy Cross: Nick Andersen (3); Army: Josiah Overbeek (16); Attendance: 907; Boxscore

May 10, 2026 2:00 PM at Doubleday Field Game 2
Team	1	2	3	4	5	6	7	8	9	R	H	E
Holy Cross	1	0	0	0	3	0	0	1	1	6	10	0
Army	0	0	0	0	0	2	0	0	0	2	6	0
WP: Jake Lenahan (3–5) LP: Kevin Reavy (3–6); Home runs: Holy Cross: Gianni Royer (6); Army: Josiah Overbeek (17); Attendance: 917; Boxscore

==== #3 Navy at #2 Bucknell ====
May 10, 2026 1:05 PM at Depew Field Game 1
Team	1	2	3	4	5	6	7	8	9	R	H	E
Navy	0	0	0	0	2	1	1	0	0	4	6	0
Bucknell	0	1	3	6	1	5	0	0	X	16	17	0
WP: Jake Schultz (3–0) LP: Brady Bendik (6–4) Sv: Tyler Hawkins (1); Home runs: Navy: Jake Hooten (3); Bucknell: None; Attendance: 310; Boxscore

May 11, 2026 1:05 PM at Depew Field Game 2
Team	1	2	3	4	5	6	7	8	9	R	H	E
Navy	1	0	0	0	0	3	0	0	0	4	6	2
Bucknell	0	0	3	2	0	0	1	0	X	6	7	1
WP: Brady Hoar (7–3) LP: Tyler Grenn (3–4) Sv: Hadley Maxwell (11); Attendance: 310; Boxscore

=== Championship Series ===
==== #4 Holy Cross at #2 Bucknell ====
May 18, 2026 1:00 PM at Eugene B. Depew Field Game 1
Team	1	2	3	4	5	6	7	8	9	R	H	E
Holy Cross	1	0	0	0	0	2	5	2	1	11	11	0
Bucknell	0	0	0	0	0	0	0	0	2	2	4	1
WP: Jaden Wywoda (6–4) LP: Jake Schultz (3–1); Home runs: Holy Cross: CJ Egrie (3), Braden Connors (3); Bucknell: None; Boxscore

May 19, 2026 2:00 PM at Eugene B. Depew Field Game 2
Team	1	2	3	4	5	6	7	8	9	R	H	E
Holy Cross	0	0	2	2	0	0	0	1	0	5	10	2
Bucknell	0	0	1	1	1	0	3	2	X	9	10	0
WP: Everett Garber (4–3) LP: Jake Lenahan (3–6); Home runs: Holy Cross: Braden Connors (4); Bucknell: Ty Lagoni (5)

May 20, 2026 2:00 PM at Eugene B. Depew Field Game 3
Team	1	2	3	4	5	6	7	8	9	R	H	E
Holy Cross	2	0	1	2	4	4	0	1	0	14	12	0
Bucknell	0	0	5	0	0	0	3	1	1	11	13	1
WP: Aidan Gilbert (2–1) LP: Bryce Mitchell (2–2) Sv: Jaden Wywoda (1); Home runs: Holy Cross: Ryan Gundy (5); Bucknell: None

== All–Tournament Team ==
Player	Team
**Jaden Wywoda**	Holy Cross
CJ Egrie	Holy Cross
Braden Connors	Holy Cross
Ryan Grundy	Holy Cross
Deacon Bowne	Bucknell
Everett Garber	Bucknell
Michael Trommer	Bucknell
Chris Barr	Army
Thomas Schreck	Army
Evan Brown	Navy
Andrew Manning	Navy

MVP in bold
