= Patrick Boen =

American baseball coach (born 1967)

Pat Boen
Current position
- Record: 667–616–4

Biographical details
- Born: March 1, 1967 (age 59)

Playing career

Basketball
- 1985–1989: Stonehill

Baseball
- 1986–1989: Stonehill
- Positions: Point guard, Shortstop

Coaching career (HC unless noted)
- 1998–2025: Stonehill

Head coaching record
- Overall: 667–616–4
- Tournaments: NCAA DI: 0–0; NCAA DII: 5–6

Accomplishments and honors

Championships
- 2× NE-10 Regular Season (1999–2000) 2x NE-10 Tournament (2000, 2006)

Awards
- 3× NE-10 Coach of the Year (1999, 2000, 2006)

Patrick John Boen (born March, 1967) is a baseball coach and former shortstop, who was the head baseball coach of the Stonehill Skyhawks. He played college baseball at Stonehill from 1986 to 1989. He also was a point guard on the Stonehill men's basketball team.

== Playing career ==
Boen grew up in Brockton, Massachusetts, where he attended Brockton High School, where he was a letterwinner for the Boxers in baseball. He also participated in basketball, where he help lead the Boxers to a state championship as a senior in 1985. Boen would go on to attend Stonehill College, where he would play both basketball and baseball.

== Coaching career ==
Boen registered his 600th career victory on March 8, 2022, with a 17–6 win over Bloomfield. In 2022, Stonehill announced it would be moving to Division I for athletics, Boen will lead the Skyhawks into the Northeast Conference in 2023.

== Head coaching record ==
Record table
Season	Team	Overall	Conference	Standing	Postseason
Stonehill Skyhawks (Northeast-10 Conference) (1998–2022)
1998	Stonehill	25–16	15–8	2nd	NE-10 Tournament
1999	Stonehill	23–21	15–9	T-1st	NE-10 Tournament
2000	Stonehill	34–20	19–5	T-1st	NCAA Regional
2001	Stonehill	27–20	21–11	4th	NE-10 Tournament
2002	Stonehill	27–22–1	19–13	2nd (Pepin)	NE-10 Tournament
2003	Stonehill	28–18	20–13	4th (Pepin)	NE-10 Tournament
2004	Stonehill	27–22–1	19–13	2nd	NE-10 Tournament
2005	Stonehill	27–20	17–13	T-3rd	NE-10 Tournament
2006	Stonehill	28–17	22–8	2nd	NE-10 Tournament
2007	Stonehill	21–24	13–17	T-7th	
2008	Stonehill	25–22	16–14	7th	
2009	Stonehill	24–22	14–16	T-7th	
2010	Stonehill	31–18	17–9	4th	NCAA Regional
2011	Stonehill	30–18	13–12	6th	NE-10 Tournament
2012	Stonehill	30–19	18–11	T-3rd (Northeast)	NE-10 Tournament
2013	Stonehill	23–22	11–16	6th (Northeast)	
2014	Stonehill	30–20	17–10	T-3rd (Northeast)	NE-10 Tournament
2015	Stonehill	34–15–1	15–6	3rd (Northeast)	NCAA Regional
2016	Stonehill	24–20	12–13	5th (Northeast)	
2017	Stonehill	15–27	9–14	4th (Northeast)	
2018	Stonehill	17–21–1	10–15–1	5th (Northeast)	
2019	Stonehill	22–25	13–14	6th (Northeast)	
2020	Stonehill	8–5	0–0		Season canceled due to COVID-19
2021	Stonehill	17–15	12–12	5th (Northeast)	NE-10 Tournament
2022	Stonehill	18–29	7–17	6th (Northeast)	
Stonehill:			364–289–1		
Stonehill Skyhawks (Northeast Conference) (2023–2025)
2023	Stonehill	14–35	10–20	9th	
2024	Stonehill	18–29	13–17	9th	
2025	Stonehill	20–32	18–12	4th	
Stonehill:		667–616–4	41–49		
Total:		667–616–4			
National champion Postseason invitational champion Conference regular season champion Conference regular season and conference tournament champion Division regular season champion Division regular season and conference tournament champion Conference tournament champion
