= Jason Anderson (baseball) =

American baseball player and coach (born 1979)

Eastern Illinois Panthers
- Manager
- Born: June 9, 1979 (age 46); Danville, Illinois, U.S.
- Batted: Left Threw: Right

MLB debut
- March 31, 2003, for the New York Yankees

Last MLB appearance
- July 15, 2005, for the New York Yankees

MLB statistics
- Win–loss record: 2–0
- Earned run average: 6.39
- Strikeouts: 19
- Stats at Baseball Reference

Teams
- New York Yankees (2003); New York Mets (2003); Cleveland Indians (2004); New York Yankees (2005)

Career highlights and awards
- OVC Coach of the Year (2025)

Jason Roger Anderson (born June 9, 1979) is an American former professional baseball pitcher and current college baseball coach. He is currently serving as head coach of the Eastern Illinois Panthers baseball team.

== Career ==
In 1997, Anderson was all-state during his senior year at Danville High School. He compiled a 14–1 record and tied the Illinois state record for consecutive shutouts with six in a row.

Anderson attended the University of Illinois on a baseball scholarship for two years, earning All-American and Academic All-American honors. He was named the Illinois Co-Newcomer of the Year in 1998 and received the George Huff Academic Award in 1999. Anderson was named Big Ten Pitcher of the Year in 2000.

Anderson was drafted by the New York Yankees in the 2000 Major League Baseball draft and signed by scout Steve Lemke. In the 2003 season, he became the first player from the Staten Island Yankees to become a New York Yankee. (Wily Mo Peña was the first Staten Island alum to make it to the majors, but he did it with the Cincinnati Reds.) The "Baby Bombers" retired Anderson's #19 on July 14, 2003, in tribute. That day was also proclaimed "Jason Anderson Day" in Staten Island. Anderson earned his first major league win that year in 22 appearances with the Yankees, but midway through the year, he was traded to the New York Mets in a deal that brought Armando Benítez to the Yankees.

In the 2004 season, Anderson was designated for assignment by the Mets, and the Cleveland Indians claimed him off waivers. He only pitched one inning for the team all year, giving up five runs, and in the next year, he rejoined the Yankees, making the major league roster after Paul Quantrill and Mike Stanton were designated for assignment.

The San Diego Padres claimed Anderson off waivers from the Yankees on February 15, 2006. Anderson was signed November 16, 2006, by the Chicago Cubs to a minor league contract.

Anderson landed in the Phillies organization May 9, 2007, when he was signed to a minor league contract and sent to the Ottawa Lynx; however, he did not get called up in 2007 and on December 7, 2007, was re-signed by the Phillies to a minor league contract. He split the 2007 season between the Triple-A Ottawa Lynx and the Double-A Reading Phillies. He split 2008 between the Triple-A Lehigh Valley IronPigs and Double-A Reading Phillies. He became a free agent after the 2008 season and re-signed with the Phillies in January 2009.

On March 7, 2011, he signed a contract with the Somerset Patriots. He retired on July 19.

In fall 2012, he was named the pitching coach of Eastern Illinois, an NCAA Division I college baseball program. After serving in this role for three seasons, he was promoted to head coach.

== Head coaching record ==
Statistics overview
Season	Team	Overall	Conference	Standing	Postseason
Eastern Illinois Panthers (Ohio Valley Conference) (2016–present)
2016	Eastern Illinois	15–39	8–22	10th	
2017	Eastern Illinois	21–35	12–18	T–8th	
2018	Eastern Illinois	23–31	12–18	8th	
2019	Eastern Illinois	26–30	13–17	7th	
2020	Eastern Illinois	8–6	2–1		Season canceled due to COVID-19
2021	Eastern Illinois	25–23	14–16	T–7th	
2022	Eastern Illinois	33–20	11–12	T–4th	
2023	Eastern Illinois	38–21	13–11	5th	NCAA regional
2024	Eastern Illinois	20–33	13–14	6th	Ohio Valley Tournament
2025	Eastern Illinois	31–22	17–7	1st	Ohio Valley Tournament
Eastern Illinois:		240–258 (.482)	115–136 (.458)		
Total:		240–258 (.482)			
National champion Postseason invitational champion Conference regular season champion Conference regular season and conference tournament champion Division regular season champion Division regular season and conference tournament champion Conference tournament champion
