= Elvis Dominguez =

Basketball Coach

Biographical details
- Born: 1963 (age 61–62); Cienfuegos, Cuba

Playing career
- 1983–1986: Creighton
- Position: Shortstop

Coaching career (HC unless noted)
- 1987–1988: Creighton (asst.)
- 1989–1992: Omaha (NE) Central HS
- 1993–1997: Creighton (asst.)
- 1998–2001: Iowa (asst.)
- 2002–2008: Eastern Kentucky
- 2009–2025: Bradley

Head coaching record
- Overall: 542–652–4
- Tournaments: NCAA: 1–2

Elvis Dominguez (born 1963) is an American college baseball coach and former shortstop, who is the former head baseball coach of the Bradley Braves. He was the 15th head coach all time for the Bradley Braves, and in 2015 lead the Bradley Braves to their first regional in 40 years.

== Playing career ==
Dominguez grew up in Cienfuegos, Cuba. He enrolled at Creighton University to play college baseball for the Creighton Bluejays baseball team.

As a freshman at Creighton University in 1983, Dominguez had a .237 batting average, a .462 on-base percentage (OBP) and a .339 SLG.

As a sophomore in 1984, Dominguez batted .304 with a .511 SLG, 4 home runs and 20 RBIs.

In the 1985 season as a junior, Dominguez hit 3 home runs and 9 doubles.

Dominguez had his best season as a senior in 1986, having career highs in doubles (13), home runs (8), RBIs (38), batting average (.348) and slugging (.613).

== Coaching career ==
In 1987, Dominguez became a graduate assistant for Creighton. After two seasons with the Bluejays, he accepted the head coaching position at Omaha Central High School. Dominguez lead Omaha Central for three seasons and, serving as a Spanish teacher, returned to Creighton as an assistant. He then spent 4 years as an assistant at the University of Iowa, where he instructed infielders, hitting and recruiting.

On August 13, 2001, Dominguez was introduced as the head coach for Eastern Kentucky Colonels.

On June 24, 2008, Dominguez was named the head coach at Bradley. During the 2015 season, he guided the Braves back to the NCAA tournament for the first time since 1968.

In September 2018, Dominguez was invited to the White House by President Trump as an influential Hispanic person in the United States.

== Head coaching record ==
Statistics overview
| Season | Team | Overall | Conference | Standing | Postseason |
|---|---|---|---|---|---|
Eastern Kentucky Colonels (Ohio Valley Conference) (2002–2008)
| 2002 | Eastern Kentucky | 15–40 | 9–11 | T-5th | |
| 2003 | Eastern Kentucky | 24–29 | 8–11 | 5th | |
| 2004 | Eastern Kentucky | 34–17 | 15–11 | T-4th | |
| 2005 | Eastern Kentucky | 26–31 | 14–12 | 5th | |
| 2006 | Eastern Kentucky | 29–26 | 16–10 | 4th | |
| 2007 | Eastern Kentucky | 24–29–1 | 12–12 | 5th | |
| 2008 | Eastern Kentucky | 26–27–1 | 12–15 | 8th | |
| Eastern Kentucky: | | 178–199–2 | 86–82 | | |
Bradley Braves (Missouri Valley Conference) (2009–2025)
| 2009 | Bradley | 17–31 | 4–17 | 9th | |
| 2010 | Bradley | 20–33 | 8–13 | 7th | |
| 2011 | Bradley | 22–32 | 4–17 | 8th | |
| 2012 | Bradley | 27–27–1 | 8–13 | 6th | |
| 2013 | Bradley | 17–32 | 2–19 | 7th | |
| 2014 | Bradley | 24–27 | 5–16 | 7th | |
| 2015 | Bradley | 36–21 | 10–11 | 3rd | NCAA Regional |
| 2016 | Bradley | 29–21 | 11–9 | 3rd | |
| 2017 | Bradley | 20–31 | 6–14 | 7th | |
| 2018 | Bradley | 32–19 | 11–10 | 3rd | |
| 2019 | Bradley | 31–19 | 11–10 | T-4th | |
| 2020 | Bradley | 4–6 | 0–0 | | Season canceled due to COVID-19 |
| 2021 | Bradley | 20–22 | 12–10 | 3rd | MVC tournament |
| 2022 | Bradley | 20–29 | 11–10 | 4th | MVC tournament |
| 2023 | Bradley | 16–32 | 7–20 | 10th | |
| 2024 | Bradley | 13–37–1 | 6–21 | 10th | |
| 2025 | Bradley | 16–34 | 12–15 | T–7th | MVC tournament |
| Bradley: | | 364–453-2 | 128–225 | | |
| Total: | | 542–652–4 | | | |
National champion Postseason invitational champion Conference regular season champion Conference regular season and conference tournament champion Division regular season champion Division regular season and conference tournament champion Conference tournament champion

== See also ==
- List of current NCAA Division I baseball coaches
