= Jim Schmitz (baseball coach) =

College baseball coach

Biographical details
- Education: Wilmington (OH) '79

Coaching career (HC unless noted)
- 1984–1986: Wilmington (OH)
- 1987–1990: Cincinnati
- 1991–1994: Ole Miss (Asst.)
- 1995–2015: Eastern Illinois

Head coaching record
- Overall: 699–742–1

Accomplishments and honors

Championships
- Ohio Valley (1998, 1999, 2001, 2009)

Jim Schmitz is an American college baseball coach, formerly the head coach at Wilmington (OH) (1984–1986), Cincinnati (1987–1990), and Eastern Illinois (1995–2015).

== Coaching career ==
Schmitz earned his first head coaching job at his alma mater Wilmington in Wilmington, Ohio in 1984. He served three seasons and led the program to its first 20 win season and first NAIA Tournament appearance in 1986. He then became head coach at Cincinnati. While with the Bearcats, he led the program to a then-record 31 wins and its first back to back winning seasons in the Metro Conference. Nine Bearcats went on to play professionally. After four seasons, he moved to Ole Miss as an assistant. He served as recruiting coordinator, and his 1993 class was ranked 17th by Collegiate Baseball. He served four seasons with the Rebels before moving to Eastern Illinois. In 21 seasons, his Panthers were regular contenders in the Ohio Valley Conference, winning four regular season titles and a pair of tournament titles while usually finishing in the top half of the league. His 1999 team reached the NCAA Division I Baseball Championship for the first time in program history. He was named OVC Coach of the Year three times. 20 of his players were drafted, including Tyler Kehrer at number 48 overall in 2009. Schmitz holds the record for most wins in program history.

== Head coaching record ==
The following table reflects Schmitz's record as a head coach at the collegiate level.

Record table
| Season | Team | Overall | Conference | Standing | Postseason |
|---|---|---|---|---|---|
Wilmington Quakers (NAIA) (1984–1986)
| 1984 | Wilmington | 18–20 | | | |
| 1985 | Wilmington | 18–20 | | | |
| 1986 | Wilmington | 25–20 | | | |
| Wilmington: | | 61–60 | | | |
Cincinnati Bearcats (Metro Conference) (1987–1990)
| 1987 | Cincinnati | 31–21 | 5–8 | 6th (7) | |
| 1988 | Cincinnati | 28–21 | 7–10 | 6th (7) | |
| 1989 | Cincinnati | 21–30 | 3–14 | 7th (7) | |
| 1990 | Cincinnati | 23–29 | 5–10 | 6th (8) | |
| Cincinnati: | | 103–101 | 20–42 | | |
Eastern Illinois Panthers (Mid-Continent Conference) (1995–1996)
| 1995 | Eastern Illinois | 28–19 | 15–5 | 1st Western (5) | |
| 1996 | Eastern Illinois | 25–22 | 15–3 | 1st Western (5) | |
| Eastern Illinois (Mid-Continent): | | 53–41 | 30–8 | | |
Eastern Illinois Panthers (Ohio Valley Conference) (1997–2015)
| 1997 | Eastern Illinois | 25–28 | 13–11 | | |
| 1998 | Eastern Illinois | 37–16 | 17–6 | 1st (9) | |
| 1999 | Eastern Illinois | 33–23 | 17–7 | 1st (9) | NCAA Regional |
| 2000 | Eastern Illinois | 22–33 | 10–13 | 6th (9) | |
| 2001 | Eastern Illinois | 35–20 | 19–1 | 1st (8) | |
| 2002 | Eastern Illinois | 25–26 | 12–8 | 2nd (8) | |
| 2003 | Eastern Illinois | 26–31 | 8–12 | 6th (8) | |
| 2004 | Eastern Illinois | 26–30 | 17–9 | 2nd (10) | |
| 2005 | Eastern Illinois | 17–39 | 14–13 | 6th (10) | |
| 2006 | Eastern Illinois | 31–24 | 17–10 | 3rd (10) | |
| 2007 | Eastern Illinois | 23–28 | 12–14 | 7th (10) | |
| 2008 | Eastern Illinois | 27–30 | 13–13 | 4th (10) | NCAA Regional |
| 2009 | Eastern Illinois | 36–14 | 14–4 | 1st (9) | |
| 2010 | Eastern Illinois | 18–35 | 11–12 | 5th (9) | |
| 2011 | Eastern Illinois | 18–33 | 9–12 | 7th (9) | |
| 2012 | Eastern Illinois | 29–29 | 15–11 | 4th (10) | OVC tournament (Note: The top six finishers of the OVC's 9 eligible teams qualified for the Tournament in 2012.) |
| 2013 | Eastern Illinois | 22–27 | 11–17 | 7th (11) | |
| 2014 | Eastern Illinois | 22–33-1 | 15–14-1 | 6th (11) | OVC tournament |
| 2015 | Eastern Illinois | 13-36 | 9-21 | 11th | |
| Eastern Illinois (OVC): | | 492-535-1 | 253–208-1 | | |
| Total: | | 699-742-1 | | | |
National champion Postseason invitational champion Conference regular season champion Conference regular season and conference tournament champion Division regular season champion Division regular season and conference tournament champion Conference tournament champion
