= Grant Neary =

American college baseball coach

Biographical details
- Education: Kean University; California University of Pennsylvania

Playing career
- 1997: Gettysburg College
- 1998: Lynchburg College
- Position: INF

Coaching career (HC unless noted)
- 2009–2010: CCNY (AHC)
- 2011: CCNY
- 2012: Bloomfield (AC/RC)
- 2013–2018: NJIT (AHC)
- 2019–2020: McDaniel
- 2021: Iona (Asst)
- 2022: Saint Peter's (AC/RC)
- 2023–2025: Saint Peter's
- 2025-Present: New Jersey Jackals (AC)

Head coaching record
- Overall: 58–162–1 (.265)
- Tournaments: 0–0

Grant Neary is an American baseball coach who was previously the head baseball coach of the Saint Peter's Peacocks (2023–25). He was also the head baseball coach of the CCNY Beavers (2011) and McDaniel Green Terror (2019–2020). He became an Assistant Coach for the New Jersey Jackals of the Frontier League (2025). Neary was a 1st Team All-State Selection at Bridgewater-Raritan High School before multiple shoulder injuries and subsequent surgeries ended his college playing career.

== Head coaching record ==
Record table
Season	Team	Overall	Conference	Standing	Postseason
CCNY Beavers (City University of New York Athletic Conference) (2011–2011)
2011	CCNY	7–27	4–6	4th	CUNY Tournament
CCNY:		7-27	4–6		
McDaniel Green Terror (Centennial Conference) (2019–2020)
2019	McDaniel	12–22–1	4–14	10th	
2020	McDaniel	8–4	0–0		Season canceled due to COVID-19
McDaniel:		20–26–1	4–14		
Saint Peter's Peacocks (Metro Atlantic Athletic Conference) (2023–2025)
2023	Saint Peter's	9–41	4–20	11th	
2024	Saint Peter's	12–40	6–18	11th	
2025	Saint Peter's	11-37	5-24	13th	
Saint Peter's:		32-118	15–62		
Total:		59–171–1			
National champion Postseason invitational champion Conference regular season champion Conference regular season and conference tournament champion Division regular season champion Division regular season and conference tournament champion Conference tournament champion
