= 2025 Patriot League baseball tournament =

- Teams: 4
- Format: Best-of-three series
- Finals site: Fitton Field; Worcester, Massachusetts
- Champions: Holy Cross (2nd title)
- Winning coach: Ed Kahovec (1st title)
- MVP: Danny Macchiarola (Holy Cross)
- Television: ESPN+

2025 Patriot League baseball standings
	Conf.				Overall
Team	W		L	PCT	W		L	PCT
Holy Cross ‍†‍‡‍^{y}	17	–	8	.680	31	–	27	.534
Navy ‍‍‍	14	–	11	.560	26	–	25	.510
Army ‍‍‍	14	–	11	.560	25	–	25	.500
Lehigh ‍‍‍	11	–	14	.440	24	–	26	.480
Bucknell ‍‍‍	10	–	15	.400	18	–	27	.400
Lafayette ‍‍‍	9	–	16	.360	14	–	35	.286
† – Conference champion ‡ – Tournament champion y – Invited to the NCAA Tournament; As of May 31, 2025; Rankings from D1Baseball

The 2025 Patriot League baseball tournament took place on consecutive weekends, with the semifinals held on May 10–11 and the finals on May 18–19. The higher seeded teams hosted each best of three series. The winner, Holy Cross won their first Patriot League title since 2017 and earned the conference's automatic bid to the 2025 NCAA Division I baseball tournament.

== Seeding ==
The top four finishers from the regular season are seeded one through four, with the top seed hosting the fourth seed and second seed hosting the third. The higher seeded team was designated as the home team for each game of the series.

Team	W	L	Pct.	GB	Seed	Tiebreaker
Holy Cross	17	8	.680	—	1	—
Navy	14	11	.560	3	2	4–1 vs. Army
Army	14	11	.560	3	3	1–4 vs. Navy
Lehigh	11	14	.440	6	4	—
Bucknell	10	15	.400	7	—	—
Lafayette	9	16	.360	8	—	—

== Bracket ==
Semifinals
1	Holy Cross	10	2	19
4	Lehigh	0	7	9
2	Navy	18	2	5
3	Army	11	13	6^{(10)}

Championship
1	Holy Cross	12	8^{(10)}	–
3	Army	1	7	–

== Results ==
=== Semifinal Series ===
==== #4 Lehigh at #1 Holy Cross ====
May 10, 2025 7:05 PM at Fitton Field Game 1
Team	1	2	3	4	5	6	7	8	9	R	H	E
Lehigh	0	0	0	0	0	0	0	0	0	0	7	3
Holy Cross	1	0	0	1	6	1	0	1	X	10	10	1
WP: Danny Macchiarola (8–4) LP: Marcus Danchision (5–4); Boxscore

May 11, 2025 2:00 PM at Fitton Field Game 2
Team	1	2	3	4	5	6	7	8	9	R	H	E
Lehigh	0	1	0	0	0	4	0	0	2	7	10	0
Holy Cross	2	0	0	0	0	0	0	0	0	2	6	3
WP: Liam O'Hearen (5–6) LP: Jaden Wywoda (9–2); Home runs: Lehigh: Owen Walewander; Holy Cross: None; Boxscore

May 11, 2025 5:30 PM at Fitton Field Game 3
Team	1	2	3	4	5	6	7	8	9	R	H	E
Lehigh	0	2	0	4	0	0	0	0	0	9	11	3
Holy Cross	3	0	0	0	0	6	6	4	X	19	16	3
WP: Luke LeMond (1–1) LP: Marcus Danchision (5–5) Sv: Pedro Leon (3); Home runs: Lehigh: Andrew Kohl; Holy Cross: John LaFleur; Notes: Holy Cross wins series 2–1; Boxscore

==== #3 Army at #2 Navy ====
May 10, 2025 1:05 PM at Terwilliger Brothers Field at Max Bishop Stadium Game 1
Team	1	2	3	4	5	6	7	8	9	R	H	E
Army	0	2	2	0	0	3	1	0	3	11	15	1
Navy	1	0	0	0	1	5	0	11	X	18	15	1
WP: Spencer Stephens (6–2) LP: Kevin Reavey (2–2); Boxscore

May 11, 2025 1:05 PM at Terwilliger Brothers Field at Max Bishop Stadium Game 2
Team	1	2	3	4	5	6	7	8	9	R	H	E
Army	0	0	0	1	2	5	1	2	2	13	12	1
Navy	0	0	1	0	0	0	0	1	0	2	13	4
WP: Justin Lehamn (5–4) LP: Matt Archibald (4–4); Boxscore

May 11, 2025 5:00 PM at Terwilliger Brothers Field at Max Bishop Stadium Game 3 (10 innings)
Team	1	2	3	4	5	6	7	8	9	10	R	H	E
Army	2	0	1	0	2	0	0	0	0	1	6	11	1
Navy	2	0	0	1	2	0	0	0	0	0	5	12	0
WP: Trey Ates (5–4) LP: Landon Kruer (3–3); Home runs: Army: William Parker; Navy: Ty DePerno; Notes: Army wins series 2–1; Boxscore

=== Championship Series ===
Patriot League Championship
(3) Army Black Knights	vs.	(1) Holy Cross Crusaders

May 18, 2025 1:05 PM at Fitton Field Game 1
Team	1	2	3	4	5	6	7	8	9	R	H	E
Army	0	0	0	1	0	0	0	0	0	1	7	2
Holy Cross	1	4	3	1	0	1	2	0	X	12	15	1
WP: Danny Macchiarola (9–4) LP: Andrew Berg (5–3); Home runs: Army: None; Holy Cross: Chris Baillargeon, Brendan Jones; Boxscore

May 19, 2025 6:05 PM at Fitton Field Game 2 (10 innings)
Team	1	2	3	4	5	6	7	8	9	10	R	H	E
Army	0	0	1	1	2	1	0	2	0	0	7	12	4
Holy Cross	0	1	2	0	0	0	4	0	0	1	8	10	5
WP: Jake Lenahan (4–2) LP: Trey Ates (5–5); Home runs: Army: Addison Ainsworth; Holy Cross: None; Notes: Winning run scored with no outs; Holy Cross wins Patriot League tournament Boxscore

== All–Tournament Team ==
Player	Team
**Danny Macchiarola**	Holy Cross
Chris Baillargeon	Holy Cross
Jimmy King	Holy Cross
Gianni Royer	Holy Cross
Justin Lehman	Army
Coleson Titus	Army
Thomas Schreck	Army
Brock Murtha	Navy
Mason Ceccarelli	Navy
Aidan Quinn	Lehigh
Liam O’Hearen	Lehigh

MVP in bold
