= Craig Moore (baseball) =

American baseball player and coach

Biographical details
- Education: Lake Erie College

Playing career
- 1996–1999: Nebraska
- Position: Shortstop

Coaching career (HC unless noted)
- 2002–2003: Lake Erie (GA)
- 2004–2006: Tennessee Tech (H)
- 2007–2010: Western Texas College
- 2011–2012: Creighton (P/AHC)
- 2013–2020: Ohio (INF)
- 2021–2025: Ohio

Head coaching record
- Overall: 108–148 (NCAA); 81–130 (NJCAA)
- Tournaments: NCAA: 0–0

Craig Moore is an American baseball coach and former shortstop, who served as the head baseball coach of the Ohio Bobcats. He played college baseball at Nebraska. He then served as the head coach of the Western Texas Westerners (2007–2010).

== Playing career ==
Moore attended Archbishop Bergan High School and played college baseball at Nebraska.

== Coaching career ==
Moore began his coaching career as the hitting coach at Tennessee Tech under head coach, Matt Bragga. After three years as the top assistant to Bragga, Moore was named the head baseball coach at Western Texas College. Moore would lead the Western Texas program for four seasons. His stint in Texas ended when he accepted an assistant coaching position for the Creighton Bluejays, returning to his home state. After two season at Creighton, Moore joined the coaching staff of the Ohio Bobcats.

On January 21, 2021, Ohio head coach Rob Smith retired, and Moore was named the interim head coach of the Bobcats. On July 20, 2021, Moore was promoted to the full time head coach of the Bobcats.

== Head coaching record ==
Record table
Season	Team	Overall	Conference	Standing	Postseason
Western Texas College Westerners (WJCAC) (2007–2010)
2007	Western Texas College	17–36			
2008	Western Texas College	18–35			
2009	Western Texas College	21–32			
2010	Western Texas College	25–27			
Western Texas College (NJCAA):		81–130			
Ohio Bobcats (Mid-American Conference) (2021–2025)
2021	Ohio	28–25	19–21	6th	
2022	Ohio	29–24	21–15	4th	MAC Tournament
2023	Ohio	19–30	15–15	5th	
2024	Ohio	18–32	13–17	8th	
2025	Ohio	14–37	9–21	T–9th	
Ohio:		108–148	77–89		
Total:		108–148			
National champion Postseason invitational champion Conference regular season champion Conference regular season and conference tournament champion Division regular season champion Division regular season and conference tournament champion Conference tournament champion
