= 2025 Ivy League baseball tournament =

- Teams: 4
- Format: Double elimination
- Finals site: George H. W. Bush Field; New Haven, CT
- Champions: Columbia (7th title)
- Winning coach: Brett Boretti (7th title)
- MVP: Anton Lazits (Columbia)
- Television: ESPN+

2025 Ivy League baseball standings
	Conf.				Overall
Team	W		L	PCT	W		L	PCT
Yale ‍†‍‍	16	–	5	.762	31	–	14	.689
Columbia ‍†‍‡‍^{y}	16	–	5	.762	30	–	19	.612
Penn ‍‍‍	13	–	8	.619	21	–	20	.512
Harvard ‍‍‍	9	–	12	.429	14	–	28	.333
Dartmouth ‍‍‍	8	–	13	.381	11	–	25	.306
Princeton ‍‍‍	8	–	13	.381	12	–	31	.279
Cornell ‍‍‍	7	–	14	.333	12	–	22	.353
Brown ‍‍‍	7	–	14	.333	11	–	28	.282
† – Conference champion ‡ – Tournament champion y – Invited to the NCAA Tournament; As of June 1, 2025; Rankings from D1Baseball

The 2025 Ivy League Baseball Tournament was a postseason baseball tournament for the Ivy League in the 2025 NCAA Division I baseball season. The tournament took place from May 16–18, 2025 and was held at George H. W. Bush Field. The 31st annual postseason Ivy tournament, Columbia defeated Harvard to earn the automatic berth to the 2025 NCAA Division I baseball tournament.

== Format ==
The top four teams in the Ivy League were seeded based on their records in league play. Ties in the standings were broken based on head-to-head record. The tournament was a double elimination tournament played at the site of the regular season champion.

== Bracket ==
First Round
1	Yale	1
4	Harvard	3
Winner's bracket
2	Columbia	4^{(10)}
3	Penn	3
1	Yale	7
3	Penn	2
Loser's bracket

Semifinal
4	Harvard	1
2	Columbia	4^{(10)}
1	Yale	6
4	Harvard	8

Final
2	Columbia	14	–
4	Harvard	6	–

== Results ==
=== Game 1 ===
May 16, 2025 12:00 PM
Team	1	2	3	4	5	6	7	8	9	R	H	E
Harvard	1	0	2	0	0	0	0	0	0	3	9	0
Yale	0	0	0	0	1	0	0	0	0	1	6	0
WP: Callan Fang (3–3) LP: Jack Ohman (8–1) Sv: Gio Colasante (1); Boxscore

=== Game 2 ===
May 16, 2025 4:00 PM
Team	1	2	3	4	5	6	7	8	9	10	R	H	E
Penn	0	0	3	0	0	0	0	0	0	0	3	9	0
Columbia	3	0	0	0	0	0	0	0	0	1	4	6	0
WP: Tomas Lopez (1–0) LP: Marty Coyne (4–2); Notes: Winning run scored with 2 outs Boxscore

=== Game 3 ===
May 17, 2025 12:00 PM
Team	1	2	3	4	5	6	7	8	9	R	H	E
Penn	0	0	0	0	0	1	0	0	1	2	4	4
Yale	2	3	0	0	0	0	2	0	0	7	6	0
WP: Colton Shaw (6–2) LP: Josh Katz (4–4); Home runs: Penn: None; Yale: Tommy Martin; Notes: Penn eliminated Boxscore

=== Game 4 ===
May 17, 2025 4:30 PM
Team	1	2	3	4	5	6	7	8	9	10	R	H	E
Columbia	0	1	0	0	0	0	0	0	0	3	4	7	0
Harvard	0	1	0	0	0	0	0	0	0	0	1	7	3
WP: Baylor Hicks (3–1) LP: Ryan McHugh (1–3); Home runs: Columbia: None; Harvard: Gio Colasante; Boxscore

=== Game 5 ===
May 18, 2025 12:00 PM
Team	1	2	3	4	5	6	7	8	9	R	H	E
Yale	1	3	0	0	0	0	1	1	0	6	9	1
Harvard	0	1	0	1	3	0	0	3	X	8	13	2
WP: Charley Bergsma (1–3) LP: Tate Evans (3–3) Sv: Ryan McHugh (4); Home runs: Yale: Kaiden Dossa; Harvard: None; Notes: Yale eliminated Boxscore

=== Game 6 ===
Ivy League Championship
(4) Harvard Crimson	vs.	(2) Columbia Lions

May 18, 2025 4:30 PM
Team	1	2	3	4	5	6	7	8	9	R	H	E
Harvard	0	0	0	1	1	2	0	0	2	6	12	2
Columbia	1	2	7	1	0	0	3	0	X	14	16	1
WP: Jagger Edwards (4–3) LP: Jack Smith (1–1) Sv: Will Harrigan (5); Home runs: Harvard: Gio Colasante; Columbia: Sam Miller, Anton Lazits 2, Cole Fellows, Tate Vogler, Owen Estabrook 2 Notes: Columbia wins Ivy League tournament Boxscore

== All–Tournament Team ==
Player	Team
Jake Moss	Penn
Marty Coyne	Penn
Colton Shaw	Yale
Max Imhoff	Yale
Gio Colasante	Harvard
Truman Pauley	Harvard
Callan Fang	Harvard
Thomas Santana	Columbia
Jack Kail	Columbia
Cole Fellows	Columbia
**Anton Lazits**	Columbia

MVP in bold
