= Scott Friedholm =

American baseball coach (born 1975)

Biographical details
- Born: March 14, 1975 (age 50); Norwood, Massachusetts, U.S.

Playing career
- 1995–1998: Providence
- 1998: St. Petersburg Devil Rays
- Position: Catcher

Coaching career (HC unless noted)
- 1999–2001: Bryant (asst.)
- 2002–2005: Maine (asst.)
- 2006–2010: Navy (asst.)
- 2011–2014: Boston College (asst.)
- 2015–2025: UNC Asheville

Head coaching record
- Overall: 195–339–1
- Tournaments: Big South: 3–4; NCAA: 0–0

Scott A. Friedholm (born March 14, 1975) is an American college baseball coach and former catcher. Friedholm is the former head coach of the UNC Asheville Bulldogs baseball team.

== Amateur career ==
Friedholm attended Walpole High School in Walpole, Massachusetts. Friedholm played for the school's varsity baseball team. Friedholm then enrolled at Providence College, to play college baseball for the Providence Friars baseball team.

As a freshman at Providence College in 1995, Friedholm was a member of the Friars team that won a school record 44 games and winning the Big East Conference. In 1996, he played collegiate summer baseball for the Chatham A's of the Cape Cod Baseball League, where he was a league all-star and helped lead the team to the league title.

As a sophomore in 1997, Friedholm had a .381 batting average, a .471 on-base percentage (OBP) and a .636 SLG.

In the 1998 season as a junior, Friedholm batted .352 with a .525 SLG, 3 home run, and 30 RBIs. He was named First Team All-Big East.

During his senior season, he hit 13 home runs, 21 doubles, 3 triples and 66 RBIs. He was named First Team All-Big East.

== Professional career ==
Friedholm began his professional career with the St. Petersburg Devil Rays of the Class A-Advanced Florida State League, where he batted .200 with one RBI.

== Coaching career ==
Friedholm began his coaching career in 1999 as a pitching coach for the Bryant Bulldogs baseball program. In 2002, Friedholm left Bryant to join the coaching staff of the Maine Black Bears to serve under Paul Kostacopoulos, whom recruited Friedholm at Providence. On August 30, 2005, he followed Kostacopoulos to work for the Navy Midshipmen baseball program. On July 28, 2010, he joined Mike Gambino's coaching staff at Boston College.

On June 18, 2014, Friedholm was the head coach of the UNC Asheville Bulldogs baseball program. Friedholm led the Bulldogs to a 21–34 record in his first season. In 2017, he led the Bulldogs to the first berth in the Big South Conference baseball tournament since 2012.

== Head coaching record ==
Statistics overview
Season	Team	Overall	Conference	Standing	Postseason
UNC Asheville Bulldogs (Big South Conference) (2015–2025)
2015	UNC Asheville	21–34	5–19	11th	
2016	UNC Asheville	16–38	5–19	11th	
2017	UNC Asheville	25–32	11–13	6th	Big South Tournament
2018	UNC Asheville	13–38	8–19	10th	
2019	UNC Asheville	16–36	9–18	9th	
2020	UNC Asheville	5–11	0–0		
2021	UNC Asheville	15–33	14–26	8th	
2022	UNC Asheville	21–29–1	14–9–1	3rd	Big South Tournament
2023	UNC Asheville	26–25	12–15	T-6th	
2024	UNC Asheville	22–28	10–14	T-5th	
2025	UNC Asheville	15–35	8–16	T-7th	
UNC Asheville:		195–339–1	96–168–1		
Total:		195–339–1			
National champion Postseason invitational champion Conference regular season champion Conference regular season and conference tournament champion Division regular season champion Division regular season and conference tournament champion Conference tournament champion

== See also ==
- List of current NCAA Division I baseball coaches
