= Grant Achilles =

American baseball player and coach

Biographical details
- Born: June 11, 1983 (age 41); Lynchburg, Virginia, U.S.

Playing career
- 2002–2006: Wake Forest
- Position(s): First Baseman, Second Baseman, Outfielder

Coaching career (HC unless noted)
- 2007: Charlotte (asst.)
- 2008–2009: Western Carolina (asst.)
- 2010–2011: Wake Forest (asst.)
- 2012: Georgetown (asst.)
- 2013–2014: Brown (asst.)
- 2015–2025: Brown

Head coaching record
- Overall: 119–252
- Tournaments: NCAA: 0–0

Grant Achilles (born June 11, 1983) is an American college baseball coach and former infielder, who was the head baseball coach of the Brown Bears.

== Playing career ==
Achilles attended Heritage High School in Lynchburg, Virginia. Achilles played for the school's varsity baseball team. Achilles then enrolled at Wake Forest University, to play college baseball for the Wake Forest Demon Deacons baseball team.

During his freshman and sophomore season, Achilles appeared in 13 games gathering twelve plate appearances going 0-for-6. He missed the entire 2004 season with a medical redshirt.

As a junior in 2005, Achilles had a .254 batting average, a .343 on-base percentage (OBP) and a .339 SLG.

As a senior in 2006, Achilles batted .185 with a .296 SLG, 1 home run, and 4 RBIs.

== Coaching career ==
Achilles began his coaching career in 2007 as an assistant with the Charlotte 49ers baseball program. On August 28, 2007, Achilles was hired as a volunteer coach for the Western Carolina Catamounts baseball program. After three years at Western Carolina, Achilles returned to Wake Forest as a volunteer assistant. On September 22, 2011, Achilles was named an assistant at Georgetown. After just a season at Georgetown, Achilles left to become the top assistant at Brown.

On April 11, 2014, Marek Drabinski stepped down as the head coach and Achilles and Mike McCormack were named the interim head coaches the remainder of the year. After going 7–9 as the co-interim head coach, Achilles was named the lone head coach of Brown on June 23, 2014.

Brown announced on May 8, 2025, that Achilles will no longer serve as head coach after 11 seasons.

== Head coaching record ==
Statistics overview
Season	Team	Overall	Conference	Standing	Postseason
Brown Bears (Ivy League) (2014–2025)
2014	Brown	7–9	6–6	3rd (Red Rolfe)	
2015	Brown	11–28	6–14	T-3rd (Red Rolfe)	
2016	Brown	15–24	9–11	T-3rd (Red Rolfe)	
2017	Brown	13–24	6–14	4th (Red Rolfe)	
2018	Brown	11–26	6–15	8th	
2019	Brown	12–27	9–12	5th	
2020	Brown	3–9	0–0		Season canceled due to COVID-19
2021	Brown	0–0	0–0		Ivy League opted-out of the 2021 season
2022	Brown	13–23	8–13	6th	
2023	Brown	12–26	9–12	6th	
2024	Brown	11–28	6–15	8th	
2025	Brown	11–28	7–14	T–7th	
Brown:		119–252	72–126		
Total:		119–252			
National champion Postseason invitational champion Conference regular season champion Conference regular season and conference tournament champion Division regular season champion Division regular season and conference tournament champion Conference tournament champion
