= Lou Gorman Field =

Sports field in Massachusetts

- Interactive map of Lou Gorman Field
- Location: Stonehill College; 320 Washington Street, North Easton, Massachusetts, USA
- Coordinates: 42.058099°N 71.083813°W
- Owner: Stonehill College
- Operator: Stonehill College
- Capacity: 500
- Surface: Grass
- Field size: Left field: 325 feet (99 m); Center field: 390 feet (120 m); Right field: 325 feet (99 m)

Construction
- Opened: 2005

Tenant
- Stonehill Skyhawks baseball (NCAA D1 NEC)

Lou Gorman Field is a baseball field located on the campus of Stonehill College in North Easton, Massachusetts, named after Stonehill alumnus and former Boston Red Sox manager Lou Gorman. The field is home to the Stonehill Skyhawks baseball team of the NCAA Division I Northeast Conference.

== History ==
The stadium was built in 2005 in order to facilitate expansion of W. B. Mason Stadium.

== Facilities ==
There are no concessions stands or permanent restrooms, and most of the seating comes from two sections of bleachers. Occasionally, due to the New England climate and the grass field, games may have to be moved to other venues.

== See also ==
- List of NCAA Division I baseball venues
