= 2025 Horizon League baseball tournament =

- Teams: 6
- Format: Double-elimination
- Finals site: Nischwitz Stadium; Fairborn, Ohio
- Champions: Wright State (12th title)
- Winning coach: Alex Sogard (4th title)
- MVP: Patrick Fultz (Wright State)
- Television: ESPN+

2025 Horizon League baseball standings
	Conf.				Overall
Team	W		L	PCT	W		L	PCT
Wright State ‍†‍‡‍^{y}	25	–	5	.833	40	–	21	.656
Northern Kentucky ‍‍‍	18	–	12	.600	31	–	25	.554
Milwaukee ‍‍‍	16	–	13	.552	24	–	35	.407
Youngstown State ‍‍‍	11	–	19	.367	15	–	42	.263
Oakland ‍‍‍	10	–	20	.333	19	–	41	.317
Purdue Fort Wayne ‍‍‍	9	–	20	.310	11	–	42	.208
† – Conference champion ‡ – Tournament champion y – Invited to the NCAA Tournament; As of June 1, 2025; Rankings from D1Baseball

The 2025 Horizon League baseball tournament was held from May 21 through 24 at Nischwitz Stadium in Fairborn, Ohio. All six teams in the league competed in the double-elimination tournament. Wright State won the tournament for the fourth time in five years, and league leading 11th time overall, to earn the Horizon League's automatic bid to the 2025 NCAA Division I baseball tournament.

== Seeding and format ==
All of the league's six teams qualify for the double-elimination tournament. Teams are seeded based on conference winning percentage, with the first tiebreaker being head-to-head record. The top two seeds receive a single bye.

Team	W	L	Pct	GB	Seed
Wright State	25	5	.833	—	1
Northern Kentucky	18	12	.600	7	2
Milwaukee	16	13	.552	8.5	3
Youngstown State	11	19	.367	14	4
Oakland	10	20	.333	15	5
Purdue Fort Wayne	9	20	.310	15.5	6

== Bracket ==
Upper round 1	Upper round 2	Upper final	Final
1	Wright State	8
3	Milwaukee	15	5	Oakland	2
6	Purdue Fort Wayne	4	1	Wright State	6
3	Milwaukee	12
3	Milwaukee	8
4	Youngstown State	2	2	Northern Kentucky	6
5	Oakland	13
3	Milwaukee	4	0
1	Wright State	13	2
Lower round 1	Lower round 2	Lower round 3	Lower final
1	Wright State	18
5	Oakland	8	2	Northern Kentucky	1
4	Youngstown State	18	2	Northern Kentucky	10
6	Purdue Fort Wayne	8	5	Oakland	22^{10}
4	Youngstown State	13

== Schedule ==
Game	Time*	Matchup^{#}	Score	Notes	Reference
Wednesday, May 21
1	11:00 am	No. 6 Purdue Fort Wayne vs No. 3 Milwaukee	4−15		
2	3:00 pm	No. 5 Oakland vs No. 4 Youngstown State	13−2		
3	7:00 pm	No. 6 Purdue Fort Wayne vs No. 4 Youngstown State	5−13	Purdue Fort Wayne Eliminated	
Thursday, May 22
4	11:00 am	No. 5 Oakland vs No. 1 Wright State	2−8		
5	3:00 pm	No. 3 Milwaukee vs No. 2 Northern Kentucky	8−6		
6	7:00 pm	No. 4 Youngstown State vs No. 5 Oakland	18−22 (F/10)	Youngstown State Eliminated	
Friday, May 23
7	11:00 am	No. 1 Wright State vs No. 3 Milwaukee	6−12		
8	3:00 pm	No. 5 Oakland vs No. 2 Northern Kentucky	8−10	Oakland Eliminated	
9	7:00 pm	No. 2 Northern Kentucky vs No. 1 Wright State	1−18	Northern Kentucky Eliminated	
Saturday, May 24
10	12:00 pm	No. 3 Milwaukee vs No. 1 Wright State	4−13		
11	4:00 pm	No. 3 Milwaukee vs No. 1 Wright State	0−2		

== All-Tournament Team ==
The following players were named to the All-Tournament Team.

Pos.	Player	School
P	Chet Lax	Wright State
P	Garrett Peters	Wright State
P	Hunter Pidek	Oakland
C	Boston Smith	Wright State
1B	Nathan Beckley	Youngstown State
2B	Tyler Bickers	Milwaukee
3B	Patrick Fultz	Wright State
SS	Luke Arnold	Wright State
OF	Brayden Kuriger	Youngstown State
OF	John Lauinger	Oakland
OF	Q Phillips	Milwaukee
DH	Charlie Marion	Milwaukee

=== All-Tournament Team ===
Patrick Fultz was named Tournament MVP. Fultz was a third baseman for Wright State.
