= 2025 Ohio Valley Conference baseball tournament =

- Teams: 8
- Format: Single-elimination/Double-elimination
- Finals site: Mtn Dew Park; Marion, Illinois
- Champions: Little Rock (1st title)
- Winning coach: Chris Curry (1st title)
- MVP: Cade Martin (Little Rock)
- Television: ESPN+

2025 Ohio Valley Conference baseball standings
| | Conf. | | | | Overall |
| Team | W | | L | PCT | W | | L | PCT |
|---|---|---|---|---|---|---|---|---|
| Eastern Illinois ‍†‍‍ | 17 | – | 7 | .708 | 31 | – | 22 | .585 |
| SIU Edwardsville ‍‍‍ | 18 | – | 8 | .692 | 26 | – | 28 | .481 |
| Tennessee Tech ‍‍‍ | 18 | – | 9 | .667 | 37 | – | 20 | .649 |
| Southeast Missouri State ‍‍‍ | 16 | – | 11 | .593 | 30 | – | 25 | .545 |
| Southern Indiana ‍‍‍ | 15 | – | 12 | .556 | 27 | – | 29 | .482 |
| Lindenwood ‍‍‍ | 14 | – | 12 | .538 | 30 | – | 30 | .500 |
| UT Martin ‍‍‍ | 11 | – | 14 | .440 | 20 | – | 34 | .370 |
| Little Rock ‍‍‡‍^{y} | 8 | – | 16 | .333 | 27 | – | 34 | .443 |
| Western Illinois ‍‍‍ | 9 | – | 18 | .333 | 18 | – | 32 | .360 |
| Morehead State ‍‍‍ | 4 | – | 23 | .148 | 14 | – | 39 | .264 |
† – Conference champion ‡ – Tournament champion y – Invited to the NCAA Tournament; As of June 2, 2025; Rankings from D1Baseball

The 2025 Ohio Valley Conference baseball tournament was held from May 21 through 24 at Mtn Dew Park in Marion, Illinois. The top eight regular season finishers of the conference's ten teams met in the tournament, with the top 4 teams receiving byes to the double elimination rounds.

== Seeding and format ==
The top eight finishers of the league's ten teams qualify for the conference tournament. Teams are seeded based on conference winning percentage, with the first tiebreaker being head-to-head record.

== Bracket ==
Upper round 1
5 | Southern Indiana | 1
8 | Little Rock | 10
6 | Lindenwood | 6
7 | UT Martin | 5

Upper round 2
4 | Southeast Missouri State | 7
8 | Little Rock | 9
3 | Tennessee Tech | 1
6 | Lindenwood | 9

Upper final
1 | Eastern Illinois | 8
8 | Little Rock | 9
2 | SIU-Edwardsville | 4
6 | Lindenwood | 7
Lower round 3
1 | Eastern Illinois | 11
2 | SIU-Edwardsville | 6

Semifinals
8 | Little Rock | 4
6 | Lindenwood | 1
Lower final
6 | Lindenwood | 1
1 | Eastern Illinois | 3

Final
8 | Little Rock | 2 | –
1 | Eastern Illinois | 1 | –

== Schedule ==
| Game | Time* | Matchup^{#} | Score | Notes | Reference |
Wednesday, May 21
| 1 | 9:00 am | No. 8 Little Rock vs No. 5 Southern Indiana | 10−1 | Southern Indiana Eliminated | |
| 2 | 12:30 pm | No. 7 UT Martin vs No. 6 Lindenwood | 5−6 | UT Martin Eliminated | |
| 3 | 4:00 pm | No. 8 Little Rock vs No. 4 Southeast Missouri State | 9−7 | Southeast Missouri State Eliminated | |
| 4 | 7:30 pm | No. 6 Lindenwood vs No. 3 Tennessee Tech | 9−1 | Tennessee Tech Eliminated | |
Thursday, May 22
| 5 | 11:00 am | No. 8 Little Rock vs No. 1 Eastern Illinois | 9−8 | | |
| 6 | 3:00 pm | No. 6 Lindenwood vs No. 2 SIU-Edwardsville | 7−4 | | |
| 7 | 3:00 pm | No. 1 Eastern Illinois vs No. 2 SIU-Edwardsville | 11−6 | SIU-Edwardsville Eliminated | |
Friday, May 23
| 8 | 2:00 pm | No. 8 Little Rock vs No. 6 Lindenwood | 4-1 | | |
| 9 | 6:00 pm | No. 6 Lindenwood vs No. 1 Eastern Illinois | 1-3 | Lindenwood Eliminated | |
Saturday, May 24
| 10 | 12:00 pm | No. 8 Little Rock vs No. 1 Eastern Illinois | | | |
| 11 | 4:00 pm | Game 10 Winner vs Game 10 Loser (if necessary) | | | |

== All–Tournament Team ==
| Player | Team |
|---|---|
| Easton Rakers | Lindenwood |
| Ethan Smith | Lindenwood |
| Bryce Riggs | Eastern Illinois |
| Tyler Castro | Eastern Illinois |
| Ethan Rossi | Eastern Illinois |
| Mike O’Conor | Eastern Illinois |
| Jackson Wells | Little Rock |
| Brody Bunting | Little Rock |
| Zach Henry | Little Rock |
| Cooper Chaplain | Little Rock |
| Alex Seguine | Little Rock |
| Jack Cline | Little Rock |
| **Cade Martin** | Little Rock |

MVP in bold
