= 2025 Conference USA baseball tournament =

- Teams: 8
- Format: Double-elimination
- Finals site: Liberty Baseball Stadium; Lynchburg, Virginia
- Champions: Western Kentucky (1st title)
- Winning coach: Marc Rardin (1st title)
- MVP: Ethan Lizama (Western Kentucky)
- Television: ESPN+

2025 Conference USA baseball standings
	Conf.				Overall
Team	W		L	PCT	W		L	PCT
No. 20 Dallas Baptist ‍†‍‍^{y}	21	–	6	.778	41	–	18	.695
Western Kentucky ‍‍‡‍^{y}	18	–	9	.667	46	–	14	.767
Kennesaw State ‍‍‍	17	–	9	.654	31	–	27	.534
Jacksonville State ‍‍‍	15	–	12	.556	37	–	25	.597
Louisiana Tech ‍‍‍	14	–	12	.538	32	–	25	.561
FIU ‍‍‍	13	–	13	.500	31	–	27	.534
New Mexico State ‍‍‍	11	–	15	.423	23	–	33	.411
Liberty ‍‍‍	10	–	17	.370	30	–	27	.526
Middle Tennessee ‍‍‍	8	–	19	.296	23	–	32	.418
Sam Houston ‍‍‍	6	–	21	.222	12	–	43	.218
† – Conference champion ‡ – Tournament champion y – Invited to the NCAA Tournament; As of June 1, 2025; Rankings from D1Baseball

The 2025 Conference USA baseball tournament was held from May 21 through 25 at Liberty Baseball Stadium in Lynchburg, Virginia. The top eight regular season finishers of the conference's ten teams met in the double-elimination tournament, and were split into two double elimination brackets of 4 teams each, before playing a single elimination championship game. This was the same format as 2024.

== Seeding and format ==
The top eight finishers of the league's ten teams qualified for the double-elimination tournament. Teams are seeded based on conference winning percentage, with the first tiebreaker being head-to-head record.

== Bracket ==
First round	Quarterfinals
3	Kennesaw State	3
6	Florida International	9
6	Florida International	6
2	Western Kentucky	7
2	Western Kentucky	7(10)
7	New Mexico State	6
Group 1
3	Kennesaw State	10
7	New Mexico State	5
6	Florida International	0
3	Kennesaw State	8
1	Dallas Baptist	5
8	Liberty	3
1	Dallas Baptist	2
4	Jacksonville State	1
4	Jacksonville State	9
5	Louisiana Tech	7
Group 2
5	Louisiana Tech	5
8	Liberty	2
4	Jacksonville State	7
5	Louisiana Tech	6

Semifinals
2	Western Kentucky	10	–
3	Kennesaw State	2	–
1	Dallas Baptist	7	3
4	Jacksonville State	11	5

Finals
2	Western Kentucky	6(11)
4	Jacksonville State	5

== Schedule ==
Game	Time*	Matchup^{#}	Score	Notes	Reference
Wednesday, May 21
1	9:00 am	No. 6 Florida International vs No. 3 Kennesaw State	9−3		
2	12:30 pm	No. 7 New Mexico State vs No. 2 Western Kentucky	6−7		
3	4:00 pm	No. 8 Liberty vs No. 1 Dallas Baptist	3−5		
4	7:30 pm	No. 5 Louisiana Tech vs No. 4 Jacksonville State	7−9		
Thursday, May 22
5	9:00 am	No. 7 New Mexico State vs No. 3 Kennesaw State	5−10	New Mexico State Eliminated	
6	12:30 pm	No. 6 Florida International vs No. 2 Western Kentucky	6−7		
7	4:00 pm	No. 8 Liberty vs No. 5 Louisiana Tech	2−5	Liberty Eliminated	
8	7:30 pm	No. 4 Jacksonville State vs No. 1 Dallas Baptist	1−2		
Friday, May 23
9	2:00 pm	No. 6 Florida International vs No. 3 Kennesaw State	0−8	Florida International Eliminated	
10	7:30 pm	No. 5 Louisiana Tech vs No. 4 Jacksonville State	6−7	Louisiana Tech Eliminated	
Saturday, May 24
11	9:00 am	No. 3 Kennesaw State vs No. 2 Western Kentucky	2−10	Kennesaw State Eliminated	
12	12:30 pm	No. 4 Jacksonville State vs No. 1 Dallas Baptist	11−7		
13	4:00 pm	No. 4 Jacksonville State vs No. 1 Dallas Baptist	5−3	Dallas Baptist Eliminated	
Sunday, May 25
	1:00 pm	No. 2 Western Kentucky vs No. 4 Jacksonville State	6−5^{11}	Jacksonville State Eliminated	

== All–Tournament Team ==
Position	Player	Team
C	Grayson Ashe	Jacksonville State
INF	Chayton Krauss	Dallas Baptist
INF	Cooper Blauser	Jacksonville State
INF	Austin Haller	Western Kentucky
INF	Carlos Vasquez	Western Kentucky
OF	Drew Collins	Jacksonville State
OF	**Ethan Lizama**	Western Kentucky
OF	Ryan Wideman	Western Kentucky
DH	Donovan Cash	Kennesaw State
P	James Ellwanger	Dallas Baptist
P	Smith Pinson	Kennesaw State
P	Karson Bonaparte	Jacksonville State
P	Jackson Phipps	Jacksonville State

MVP in bold
