= Holy Cross Crusaders baseball =

- 2026 Holy Cross Crusaders baseball team
- Founded: 1876; 150 years ago
- University: College of the Holy Cross
- Head coach: Ed Kahovec (7th season)
- Conference: Patriot League
- Location: Worcester, Massachusetts
- Home stadium: Hanover Insurance Park at Fitton Field (capacity: 3,000)
- Nickname: Crusaders
- Colors: Royal purple

College World Series champions
- 1952

College World Series appearances
- 1952, 1958, 1962, 1963

NCAA tournament appearances
- 1952, 1954, 1955, 1958, 1960, 1962, 1963, 1965, 1967, 1978, 2017, 2025, 2026

Conference tournament champions
- Patriot League: 2017, 2025, 2026

Conference regular season champions
- MAAC: 1986; Patriot League: 2013, 2025

The Holy Cross Crusaders baseball team is a varsity intercollegiate athletic team of the College of the Holy Cross in Worcester, Massachusetts, United States. The team is a member of the Patriot League, which is part of the National Collegiate Athletic Association's Division I. The team plays its home games at Hanover Insurance Park at Hanover Insurance Park at Fitton Field in Worcester, Massachusetts. The Crusaders are coached by Ed Kahovec. Holy Cross has participated in the NCAA tournament 12 times and has advanced to the College World Series on four occasions, capturing the title in 1952. The team earned its first Patriot League regular season title in 2013 before falling in the Patriot League Championship Series for the third time in four years. The team also boasts recent wins over top 10 teams, defeating #4 Texas A&M in 2012 and #7 Mississippi State in 2014.

In 2017, the team won its first Patriot League Tournament championship by sweeping Army and Bucknell. It was the fifth PLCS appearance for the Crusaders in eight years. They captured their second Patriot League Tournament championship in 2025, defeating Lehigh in the semifinal series and sweeping Army in the championship series. In 2026, as the No. 4 seed, the Crusaders won back-to-back Patriot League Tournament Championships for the first time in program history, sweeping Army in the semifinal series before beating Bucknell in three games in the championship series. Holy Cross became the first No. 4 seed to win the Patriot League Tournament Championship since 2010.

The Crusaders have had 33 players selected by Major League teams in the MLB draft, most recently Nick Lovullo (Boston Red Sox, 2016), Brendan King (Chicago Cubs, 2017), Declan Cronin (Chicago White Sox, 2019) and Danny Macchiarola (Seattle Mariners, 2025).

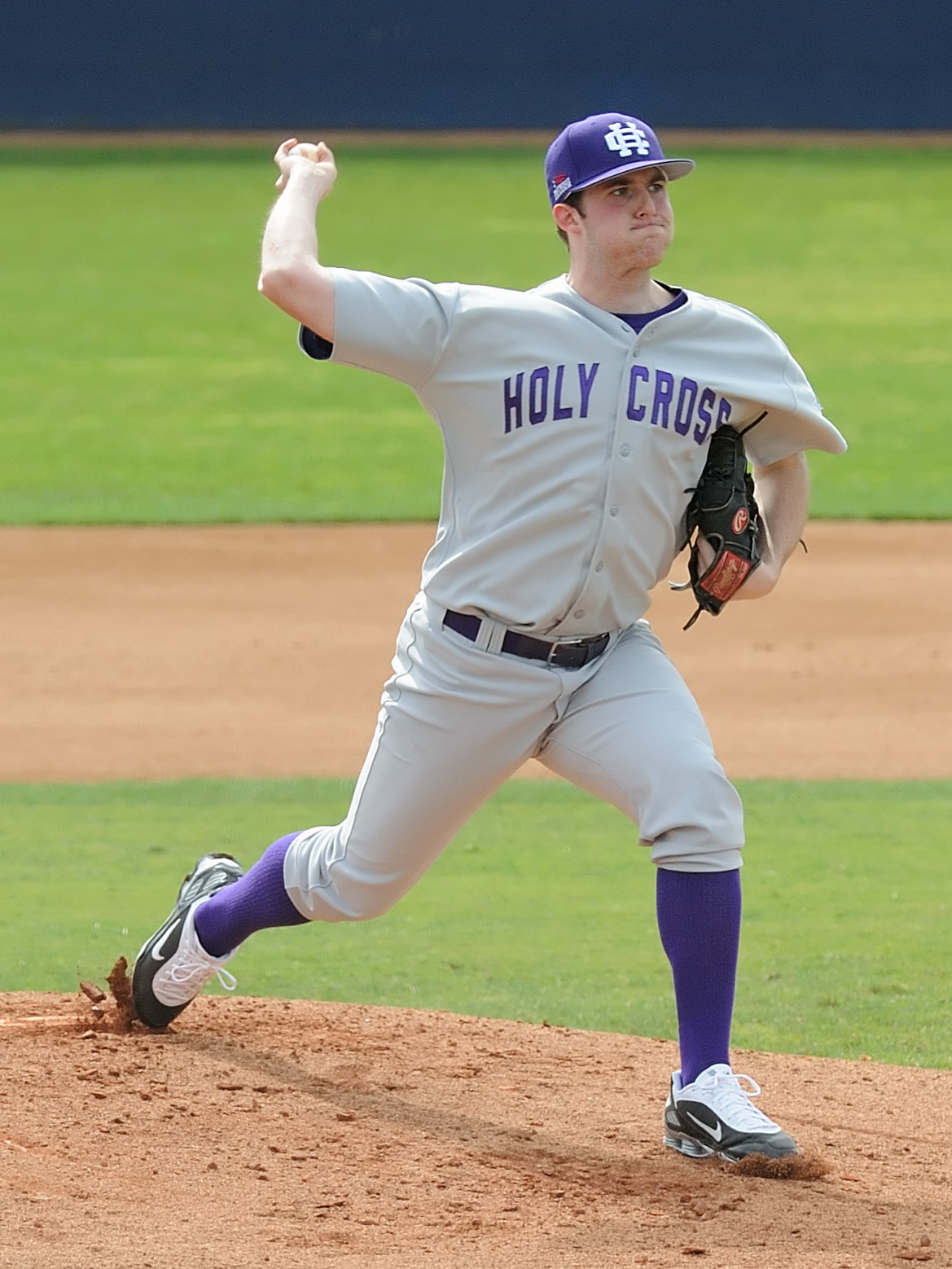
A Crusaders pitcher at George C. Page Stadium in 2009

== NCAA tournament ==
The Crusaders have participated in the NCAA tournament on thirteen occasions and have advanced to the College World Series four times, winning in 1952.

Season	Region	Round	Opponent	Result
1952	College World Series	Upper Round 1 Upper Round 2 Lower Round 2 Lower Round 2 Semifinals; Final Game 1 Final Game 2	Western Michigan; Missouri; Texas; Western Michigan; Penn State; Missouri; Missouri	W 5–1; L 0–1; W 2–1; W 15–3; W 15–4; W 7–3; W 8–4
1954	District 1	Semifinals	Boston University	L 1–8
1955	District 1	Semifinals	Massachusetts	L 0–1
1958	District 1 College World Series	Semifinals Game 1 Semifinals Game 2 District Final; CWS Upper Round 1 CWS Upper Round 2 CWS Upper Round 3 CWS Semifinals	Colby; Colby; Connecticut; USC; Clemson; Missouri; USC	W 4–3; W 5–1; W 2–1 (10); W 3–0; W 17–4; L 1–4; L 2–6
1960	District 1	Semifinals; District Final	American International; Boston College	W 5–1; L 4–5
1962	District 1 College World Series	Quarterfinals; Semifinals; District Final; CWS Round 1 CWS Round 2 CWS Lower Round 2	Vermont; Bridgeport; Vermont; Colorado State College; Michigan; Santa Clara	W 7–5; W 5–2; W 12–5; W 4–3; L 4–11; L 7–12
1963	District 1 College World Series	Semifinals Game 1 Semifinals Game 2 Final Game 1 Final Game 2 CWS Upper Round 1 CWS Lower Round 1	Boston College; Providence; Missouri; USC	W 4–0; W 7–4; W 11–0; W 7–4; L 0–3; L 5–6
1965	District 1	Finals	Connecticut	L 4–7; W 5–0; L 0–7
1967	District 1	Semifinals	Massachusetts	L 0–4; L 0–6
1978	Northeast Regional	Round 1 Round 2 Quarterfinals	St. John's; Temple; St. John's	W 5–3; L 7–8; L 12–14
2017	Corvallis Regional	Regionals	Oregon State; Nebraska; Yale	L 2–8; W 7–4; L 5–9
2025	Chapel Hill Regional	Regionals	North Carolina; Nebraska	L 0–4; L 1–4
2026	Austin Regional	Regionals	Texas; UC Santa Barbara	L 1–19; L 1-15
TOTALS	23–22	.511		

=== College World Series Most Outstanding Player ===
- 1952–James O'Neill

== Awards and honors ==
=== NCAA ===
All-American

- Jim Sweeney (3rd Team), 1999

Academic All-American

- Nick DeAngelis (2nd Team), 1970
- Bill Doran (2nd Team), 1976
- Ron Perry (1st Team), 1978-1980
- Todd Dextradeur (1st Team), 1990
- Tom Miller (2nd Team), 1991
- Gerard Lambert (3rd Team), 1991-1992
- Paige Brennan (2nd Team), 1993; (3rd Team), 1994

Freshman All-American

- Austin Masel, 2017
- Ben Dellacono, 2020

=== Patriot League ===
Patriot League Player of the Year

- Jim Sweeney, 1999
- Peter Summa, 2001
- Matt Perry, 2009
- Jordan Enos, 2013
- CJ Egrie, 2025
- CJ Egrie, 2026

Patriot League Pitcher of the Year

- Matt Shapiro, 2008
- John Colella, 2013
- Jaden Wywoda, 2025

Patriot League Rookie of the Year

- Tyler Stampone, 2006
- Stephen Wadsworth, 2010
- Cam O'Neill, 2015
- Austin Masel, 2017

Patriot League All-Decade Team

- Terrence Butt, 1990s

Patriot League 25th Anniversary Team (2015)

- John Colella
- Matt Perry
- Jim Sweeney

Patriot League Outstanding Leadership & Character Award

- Declan Cronin, 2019

== See also ==
- 1952 Holy Cross Crusaders baseball team
- 1952 College World Series
- Jack Barry
- List of NCAA Division I baseball programs
