= Craig Moore (politician) =

American politician

Member of New Hampshire House of Representatives for Hillsborough 25
- In office 2016–2018

Personal details
- Party: Republican

Craig C. Moore is an American politician. He was a member of the New Hampshire House of Representatives and represented Hillsborough 25th district from 2016 to 2018.
