= Auntwan Riggins =

American baseball coach

Biographical details
- Born: June 17, 1976 (age 50); Lufkin, Texas, U.S.
- Education: Texas Southern University

Playing career
- 1996–1998: Texas Southern
- 1998: Medicine Hat Blue Jays
- 1998–1999: St. Catharines Stompers
- 2000: Hagerstown Suns
- 2001: Fort Wayne Wizards
- 2001: Lake Elsinore Storm
- 2001: Fort Wayne Wizards
- 2001: Portland Beavers
- 2002: Lake Elsinore Storm
- 2003: Evansville Otters
- 2004: Coastal Bend Aviators
- Position: Outfielder

Coaching career (HC unless noted)
- 2016–2025: Prairie View A&M

Head coaching record
- Overall: 176–303
- Tournaments: SWAC: 8–14

Accomplishments and honors

Championships
- SWAC West division (2021)

Auntwan Demone Riggins (born June 17, 1976) is an American college baseball coach who served as head coach of the Prairie View A&M Panthers baseball team.

== Head coaching record ==
Record table
| Season | Team | Overall | Conference | Standing | Postseason |
|---|---|---|---|---|---|
Prairie View A&M Panthers (Southwestern Athletic Conference) (2016–2025)
| 2016 | Prairie View A&M | 10–32 | 5–18 | 5th (West) | |
| 2017 | Prairie View A&M | 20–37 | 11–13 | 3rd (West) | SWAC Tournament |
| 2018 | Prairie View A&M | 14–40 | 8–16 | 4th (West) | SWAC Tournament |
| 2019 | Prairie View A&M | 18–35 | 9–14 | 4th (West) | SWAC Tournament |
| 2020 | Prairie View A&M | 4–15 | 1–5 | (West) | Season canceled due to COVID-19 |
| 2021 | Prairie View A&M | 14–18 | 12–7 | 1st (West) | SWAC Tournament |
| 2022 | Prairie View A&M | 30–27 | 19–11 | 4th (West) | SWAC Tournament |
| 2023 | Prairie View A&M | 20–37 | 14–15 | 4th (West) | SWAC Tournament |
| 2024 | Prairie View A&M | 29–26 | 18–9 | 3rd (West) | SWAC Tournament |
| 2025 | Prairie View A&M | 17–36 | 13–14 | 9th | |
| Prairie View A&M: | | 176–303 | 110–122 | | |
| Total: | | 176–303 | | | |
National champion Postseason invitational champion Conference regular season champion Conference regular season and conference tournament champion Division regular season champion Division regular season and conference tournament champion Conference tournament champion
