= Rob Smith (baseball) =

Playing career
- 1991–1992: Vincennes
- 1993–1994: Indiana–Southeast

Coaching career (HC unless noted)
- 1999: Purdue (Asst.)
- 2001–2006: Purdue (Asst.)
- 2007–2012: Creighton (Asst.)
- 2013–2020: Ohio

Head coaching record
- Overall: 159–230
- Tournaments: NCAA: 0–4

Rob Smith in an American baseball coach and former outfielder. He played college baseball at Vincennes for two seasons, then completed his eligibility at Indiana–Southeast before completing his degree at Indiana University Bloomington in 1998. He then spent a year as an assistant coach at Purdue in 1999, and returned to the Boilermakers from 2001 through 2006. Smith was hired as associate head coach at Creighton. He was hired as head coach at Ohio in June 2012, retiring in January 2021.

== Head coaching record ==
Record table
Season	Team	Overall	Conference	Standing	Postseason
Ohio Bobcats (Mid-American Conference) (2013–2020)
2013	Ohio	14–39	9–18	6th (East)	
2014	Ohio	11–40	7–20	6th (East)	
2015	Ohio	36–21	17–10	2nd (East)	NCAA Regionals
2016	Ohio	23–29	8–16	3rd (East)	
2017	Ohio	31–28	13–11	2nd (East)	NCAA Regionals
2018	Ohio	21–32	9–18	8th	
2019	Ohio	20–34	12–14	6th	
2020	Ohio	3–7	0–0		Season canceled due to COVID-19
Ohio:		159–230	75–107		
Total:		159–230			
National champion Postseason invitational champion Conference regular season champion Conference regular season and conference tournament champion Division regular season champion Division regular season and conference tournament champion Conference tournament champion
