= Riggins Lake =

- Location within Michigan
- Location: Berrien County
- Coordinates: 41°56′10″N 86°15′55″W
- Type: lake

Riggins Lake is a lake in Berrien County, in the U.S. state of Michigan.

Riggins Lake has the name of David Riggins, a pioneer who settled at the lake in 1834. It has a size of 45.559 acres (18.437 ha).
