= Riggin =

Riggin is an Anglicized form of the Irish surname Ó Riagáin ("son of Riagán") derived from the Irish personal name Riagán, which means "little king". Notable people with the surname include:

- Aileen Riggin (1906–2002), American Olympic swimmer and diver
- Dennis Riggin (1936–2016), Canadian ice hockey player
- Pat Riggin (born 1959), Canadian ice hockey player

== See also ==
- Riggins (disambiguation)
- Riggin o Fife, an upland area in Scotland
