= 2025 Mountain West Conference baseball tournament =

- Teams: 6
- Format: Single-elimination/Double-elimination
- Finals site: Sloan Park; Mesa, Arizona
- Champions: Fresno State (4th title)
- Winning coach: Ryan Overland (2nd title)
- MVP: Murf Gray (Fresno State)
- Television: Mountain West Network; Ryz Sports Network (championship)

2025 Mountain West Conference baseball standings
	Conf.				Overall
Team	W		L	PCT	W		L	PCT
Nevada ‍†‍‍	19	–	11	.633	34	–	23	.596
Fresno State ‍‍‡‍^{y}	18	–	12	.600	31	–	29	.517
New Mexico ‍‍‍	17	–	13	.567	30	–	23	.566
UNLV ‍‍‍	16	–	14	.533	31	–	23	.574
San Diego State ‍‍‍	14	–	16	.467	20	–	39	.339
San Jose State ‍‍‍	13	–	17	.433	29	–	30	.492
Air Force ‍‍‍	12	–	18	.400	20	–	34	.370
Washington State ‍‍‍	11	–	19	.367	18	–	36	.333
† – Conference champion ‡ – Tournament champion y – Invited to the NCAA Tournament; As of May 31, 2025; Rankings from D1Baseball

The 2025 Mountain West Conference baseball tournament was held from May 21 through 24 at Sloan Park in Mesa, Arizona. The top six regular season finishers of the conference's eight teams met in the tournament, with the top 2 teams receiving byes to the double-elimination rounds.

== Seeding and format ==
The top six finishers of the league's eight teams qualify for the conference tournament. Teams are seeded based on conference winning percentage, with the first tiebreaker being head-to-head record.

== Bracket ==
Upper round 1
3	New Mexico	3
6	San Jose State	6
4	UNLV	0
5	San Diego State	8

Upper round 2
1	Nevada	15 (7)
5	San Diego State	4
2	Fresno State	7
6	San Jose State	3
Lower round 2
5	San Diego State	6
6	San Jose State	7

Upper final
1	Nevada	7
2	Fresno State	12 (14)
Lower final
1	Nevada	3
6	San Jose State	4 (10)

Final
2	Fresno State	9	−
6	San Jose State	1	−

== Schedule ==
Game	Time*	Matchup^{#}	Score	Notes	Reference
Wednesday, May 21
1	1:05 pm	No. 6 San Jose State vs No. 3 New Mexico	6−3	New Mexico Eliminated	
2	6:05 pm	No. 5 San Diego State vs No. 4 UNLV	8−0	UNLV Eliminated	
Thursday, May 22
3	1:05 pm	No. 5 San Diego State vs No. 1 Nevada	4−15 (F/7)		
4	6:05 pm	No. 6 San Jose State vs No. 2 Fresno State	3−7		
Friday, May 23
5	11:05 am	No. 5 San Diego State vs No. 6 San Jose State	6−7	San Diego State Eliminated	
6	3:05 pm	No. 1 Nevada vs No. 2 Fresno State	7−12 (F/14)		
7	7:05 pm	No. 6 San Jose State vs No. 1 Nevada	4−3 (F/10)	Nevada Eliminated	
Saturday, May 24
8	12:05 pm	No. 6 San Jose State vs No. 2 Fresno State	1−9		

== All–Tournament Team ==
Player	Team
**Murf Gray**	Fresno State
Bryce Armstrong	Fresno State
Sky Collins	Fresno State
Lee Trevino	Fresno State
Michael Ball	Nevada
Jackson Waller	Nevada
Nevan Noonan	San Diego State
Marko Sipila	San Diego State
Tyler Alabanese	San Jose State
Kyle Calzdiaz	San Jose State
Alex Fernnades	San Jose State

MVP in bold
