= Stonehill Skyhawks baseball =

Stonehill Skyhawks
- 2026 Stonehill Skyhawks baseball team
- University: Stonehill College
- Head coach: Sean Callahan (1st season)
- Conference: Northeast Conference
- Location: Easton, Massachusetts
- Home stadium: Lou Gorman Field
- Nickname: Skyhawks
- Colors: Purple and white

NCAA tournament appearances
- Division II: 2000, 2010, 2015

Conference tournament champions
- Northeast-10 Conference: 2000, 2010

Conference regular season champions
- 1985, 1999, 2000

The Stonehill Skyhawks baseball team is the varsity intercollegiate athletic team of the Stonehill College in Easton, Massachusetts, United States. The team competes in the National Collegiate Athletic Association's Division I and is a member of the Northeast Conference since 2023. They will become full members in the 2026 season after finishing the four-year NCAA Division I reclassification period.

== NCAA tournament ==
Stonehill appeared in the NCAA Division II baseball tournament three times. They went 5–6.

Year	Opponent	Result
2000	Concordia (NY); Saint Rose; Concordia (NY); Saint Rose	W 10–5; L 2–5; W 2–0; L 3–6
2010	New Haven; Franklin Pierce; LIU Post; Franklin Pierce	W 5–0; L 0–6; W 8–1; L 0–2
2015	Dowling; Wilmington (DE)	W 5–3; L 3–4
