= Ed Kahovec =

American college baseball coach

Current position
- Title: Head coach
- Team: Holy Cross
- Conference: Patriot League
- Record: 130–186

Playing career
- 2005–2008: Rochester
- 2008: Erbach Grasshoppers
- Position: Shortstop

Coaching career (HC unless noted)
- 2009–2012: Rochester (asst.)
- 2013–2016: Bard
- 2017–2019: Holy Cross (asst.)
- 2020–present: Holy Cross

Head coaching record
- Overall: 162–285–1

Accomplishments and honors

Championships
- Patriot League regular season (2025); 2x Patriot League Tournament (2025, 2026)

Awards
- 2× Patriot Coach of the Year (2024, 2025)

Ed Kahovec is an American college baseball coach and former shortstop, who is currently the head baseball coach of the Holy Cross Crusaders. Kahovec played college baseball at the University of Rochester from 2005 to 2008. He served as the head coach at Bard College (2013–2016).

== Playing career ==
Kahovec attended Victor Senior High School in Victor, New York. Kahovec then attended University of Rochester where he would continue his baseball career. After playing as a backup as a freshman, Kahovec took over the starting shortstop role as a sophomore. He made the All-University Athletic Association First Team twice, and the All-Liberty League First Team once. He batted .372 in his senior year, leading the Yellowjackets to the regular season Liberty League title.

On May 20, 2008, Kahovec signed with the Erbach Grasshoppers of the German Baseball League.

== Coaching career ==
Kahovec returned to Rochester in 2009 as an assistant for the Yellowjackets. On August 2, 2012, Kahovec was named the head baseball coach at Bard College.

In January, 2020, Kahovec was named the interim head baseball coach at Holy Cross. At the conclusion of the 2020 season, he was announced as the head coach for the Crusaders baseball program.

== Head coaching record ==
Record table
Season	Team	Overall	Conference	Standing	Postseason
Bard Raptors (Independent) (2013)
2013	Bard	8–18			
Bard Raptors (Liberty League) (2014–2016)
2014	Bard	3–26–1	0–20–1		
2015	Bard	11–25	6–18		
2016	Bard	10–30	5–19		
Bard:		32–99–1	11–57–1		
Holy Cross Crusaders (Patriot League) (2020–present)
2020	Holy Cross	5–10	0–0		Season canceled due to COVID-19
2021	Holy Cross	10–20	9–15	3rd (North)	
2022	Holy Cross	17–37	11–14	4th	Patriot League Tournament
2023	Holy Cross	16–35	6–19	6th	
2024	Holy Cross	26–27	14–11	3rd	Patriot League Tournament
2025	Holy Cross	31–27	17–8	1st	NCAA Regional
2026	Holy Cross	25–30	13–13	4th	NCAA Regional
Holy Cross:		130–186	73–70		
Total:		162–285–1			
National champion Postseason invitational champion Conference regular season champion Conference regular season and conference tournament champion Division regular season champion Division regular season and conference tournament champion Conference tournament champion
