= Eastern Illinois Panthers baseball =

- 2026 Eastern Illinois Panthers baseball team
- Founded: 1904
- University: Eastern Illinois University
- Athletic director: Tom Michael
- Head coach: Jason Anderson (11th season)
- Conference: Ohio Valley Conference
- Location: Charleston, Illinois
- Home stadium: Coaches Stadium at Monier Field (capacity: 500)
- Nickname: Panthers
- Colors: Blue and gray

College World Series runner-up
- 1981*

College World Series appearances
- 1973*, 1978*, 1981*

NCAA tournament appearances
- 1973*, 1975*, 1976*, 1978*, 1981*, 1999, 2008, 2023 *at Division II level

Conference tournament champions
- OVC: 1999, 2008, 2023

Conference regular season champions
- IIAC: 1947, 1949, 1953; Mid-Cont: 1985, 1987, 1991; OVC: 1998, 1999, 2001, 2009, 2025

The Eastern Illinois Panthers baseball team is a varsity intercollegiate athletic team of Eastern Illinois University in Charleston, Illinois. The team is a member of the Ohio Valley Conference, which is part of the National Collegiate Athletic Association's Division I. Eastern Illinois’ first baseball team was fielded in 1904. The team plays its home games at Coaches Stadium at Monier Field in Charleston, Illinois. The Panthers are coached by Jason Anderson.

== Eastern Illinois in the NCAA Tournament ==
Year	Record	Pct	Notes
1999	1–2	.333	Waco Regional
2008	0–2	.000	Lincoln Regional
2023	0–2	.000	Nashville Regional
TOTALS	1–6	.143	

== Head coaches ==
Year(s)	Coach	Seasons	Overall record	Pct
1904–11	A.B. Crowe	8	32–17	.653
1912–50; 1952	Charles Lantz	39	171–216	.442
1951	Henry Miller	1	10–5	.667
1953–56	Clifton White	4	45–38	.542
1957	Bill Rogers	1	4–11	.267
1958–62	Jack Kaley	5	75–61	.551
1963–65; 1967–74	Bill McCabe	11	201–133	.602
1966	Ben Newcomb	1	9–17	.346
1975–77	J.W. Sanders	3	84–49	.632
1978–88	Tom McDevitt	11	299–187–3	.615
1989–94	Dan Callahan	6	154–158–1	.494
1995–2015	Jim Schmitz	20	533–581–1	.478
2016–present	Jason Anderson	9	209–236	.470
Totals	13 Coaches	119 Years	1,846–1,711–5	.519

== Season Results ==
Year	Coach	Overall record	Conference record	Conference standing	Postseason
Independent 1904–1946
1904	A.B. Crowe	4–0	—	—	—
1905	A.B. Crowe	2–0	—	—	—
1906	A.B. Crowe	4–2	—	—	—
1907	A.B. Crowe	5–0	—	—	—
1908	A.B. Crowe	9–3	—	—	—
1909	A.B. Crowe	4–2	—	—	—
1910	A.B. Crowe	2–5	—	—	—
1911	A.B. Crowe	2–5	—	—	—
1912	Charles Lantz	2–5	—	—	—
1913	Charles Lantz	5–2	—	—	—
1914	Charles Lantz	3–4	—	—	—
1915	Charles Lantz	3–4	—	—	—
1916	Charles Lantz	3–3	—	—	—
1917	Charles Lantz	1–5	—	—	—
1918	Charles Lantz	6–4	—	—	—
1919	Charles Lantz	2–5	—	—	—
1920	Charles Lantz	6–2	—	—	—
1921	Charles Lantz	4–4	—	—	—
1922	Charles Lantz	3–4	—	—	—
1923	Charles Lantz	2–4	—	—	—
1924	Charles Lantz	6–3	—	—	—
1925	Charles Lantz	4–5	—	—	—
1926	Charles Lantz	3–7	—	—	—
1927	Charles Lantz	4–5	—	—	—
1928	Charles Lantz	1–9	—	—	—
1929	Charles Lantz	2–5	—	—	—
1930	Charles Lantz	1–5	—	—	—
1931	Charles Lantz	3–6	—	—	—
1932	Charles Lantz	4–7	—	—	—
1933	Charles Lantz	5–6	—	—	—
1934	Charles Lantz	3–7	—	—	—
1935	Charles Lantz	5–4	—	—	—
1936	Charles Lantz	4–6	—	—	—
1937	Charles Lantz	1–7	—	—	—
1938	Charles Lantz	6–7	—	—	—
1939	Charles Lantz	5–8	—	—	—
1940	Charles Lantz	4–10	—	—	—
1941	Charles Lantz	7–5	—	—	—
1942	Charles Lantz	6–7	—	—	—
1943	Charles Lantz	4–7	—	—	—
1944	No Games Played	N/A	N/A	N/A	N/A
1945	Charles Lantz	3–6	—	—	—
1946	Charles Lantz	3–7	—	—	—
Interstate Intercollegiate Athletic Conference 1947–1969
1947	Charles Lantz	10–5	—	1st	
1948	Charles Lantz	13–4	—	2nd	
1949	Charles Lantz	10–7	—	1st	
1950	Charles Lantz	6–8	—	3rd	
1951	Henry Miller	10–5	—	4th	
1952	Charles Lantz	7–8	—	4th	
1953	Clifton White	11–3	—	1st	
1954	Clifton White	14–6	—	T-2nd	
1955	Clifton White	12–13	—	6th	
1956	Clifton White	8–16	—	7th	
1957	Bill Rogers	4–11	—	7th	
1958	Jack Kaley	7–13	—	7th	
1959	Jack Kaley	14–15	—	T-3rd	
1960	Jack Kaley	19–12	7–7	3rd	
1961	Jack Kaley	18–11	11–6	2nd	
1962	Jack Kaley	17–10	10–4	2nd	
1963	Bill McCabe	15–10	6–6	T-2nd	
1964	Bill McCabe	23–7	8–4	2nd	
1965	Bill McCabe	15–8	5–5	T-2nd	
1966	Ben Newcomb	9–17	3–7	3rd	
1967	Bill McCabe	14–17	3–6	3rd	
1968	Bill McCabe	18–7	3–4	2nd	
1969	Bill McCabe	10–14	1–5	3rd	
Independent 1970–1984
1970	Bill McCabe	13–20	—	—	
1971	Bill McCabe	25–12	—	—	
1972	Bill McCabe	19–11	—	—	
1973	Bill McCabe	27–13	—	—	
1974	Bill McCabe	22–14	—	—	
1975	J. W. Sanders	25–15	—	—	
1976	J. W. Sanders	36–11	—	—	
1977	J. W. Sanders	23–23	—	—	
1978	Tom McDevitt	27–19	—	—	
1979	Tom McDevitt	20–18	—	—	
1980	Tom McDevitt	26–20	—	—	
1981	Tom McDevitt	36–14	—	—	
1982	Tom McDevitt	29–12	—	—	
1983	Tom McDevitt	22–12	—	—	
1984	Tom McDevitt	19–11	—	—	
Mid-Continent Conference 1985–1996
1985	Tom McDevitt	33–14–1	8–0	1st (Gray)	
1986	Tom McDevitt	29–22–1	4–7	3rd	
1987	Tom McDevitt	31–22–1	9–3	1st (Gray)	
1988	Tom McDevitt	27–23	6—6	2nd (Gray)	
1989	Dan Callahan	31–19	6–2	2nd (Gray)	
1990	Dan Callahan	24–30	4–7	2nd (Gray)	
1991	Dan Callahan	27–32	8–0	1st (West)	
1992	Dan Callahan	24–30	13–7	1st (West)	
1993	Dan Callahan	23–23–1	9–6–1	3rd	
1994	Dan Callahan	24–24	14–8	2nd	
1995	Jim Schmitz	28–19	15–5	1st (West)	
1996	Jim Schmitz	25–22	15–3	1st (West)	
Ohio Valley Conference 1997–present
1997	Jim Schmitz	25–28	13–11	4th	
1998	Jim Schmitz	37–16	17–6	1st	
1999	Jim Schmitz	33–23	17–7	1st	NCAA First Round
2000	Jim Schmitz	22–33	10–13	6th	
2001	Jim Schmitz	35–20	19—1	1st	
2002	Jim Schmitz	25–26	12–8	2nd	
2003	Jim Schmitz	26–31	8–12	6th	
2004	Jim Schmitz	26–30	17–9	2nd	
2005	Jim Schmitz	17–39	14–13	T-6th	
2006	Jim Schmitz	31–24	17–10	3rd	
2007	Jim Schmitz	23–28	12–15	7th	
2008	Jim Schmitz	27–30	13–13	4th	NCAA First Round
2009	Jim Schmitz	31–19	13–5	1st	
2010	Jim Schmitz	18–35	11–12	5th	
2011	Jim Schmitz	18–33	9–12	7th	
2012	Jim Schmitz	29–29	15–11	4th	
2013	Jim Schmitz	22–27	11–17	7th	
2014	Jim Schmitz	22–33–1	15–14–1	6th	
2015	Jim Schmitz	13–36	9–21	11th	
2016	Jason Anderson	15–39	8–22	10th	
2017	Jason Anderson	21–35	12–18	9th	
2018	Jason Anderson	23–31	12–18	8th	
2019	Jason Anderson	26–30	13–17	7th	
2020	Jason Anderson	8–6	2–1	T-3rd	
2021	Jason Anderson	25-23	14-16	T-7th	
2022	Jason Anderson	33–20	12–12	T-4th	
2023	Jason Anderson	38–21	13–11	5th	NCAA First Round
2024	Jason Anderson	20–33	13–14	T-5th	
2025	Jason Anderson	31–22	17–7	1st	
Totals	120 Years; 13 Coaches	1,857–1,733–5 (.517)			7 appearances

== Retired Numbers ==
No.	Player	Position	Career	Date of Retirement
2	Kevin Seitzer	3B	1980–83	October 13, 2012
19	Marty Pattin	P	1962–65	April 18, 2009

== Notable former players ==
- Tim Bogar, Major League Baseball (MLB) infielder and coach
- Zach Borenstein, professional baseball player
- Randy Myers, MLB pitcher with the New York Mets, Cincinnati Reds, San Diego Padres, Chicago Cubs, Baltimore Orioles and the Toronto Blue Jays between 1985 and 1998. 4x MLB All-Star.
- Marty Pattin, MLB All-Star pitcher
- Stan Royer, MLB player for the St. Louis Cardinals and Boston Red Sox
- Kevin Seitzer, MLB All-Star and hitting coach

== See also ==
- NCAA Division II baseball tournament
