= Army Black Knights baseball statistical leaders =

The Army Black Knights baseball statistical leaders are individual statistical leaders of the Army Black Knights baseball program in various categories, including batting average, home runs, runs batted in, runs, hits, stolen bases, ERA, and Strikeouts. Within those areas, the lists identify single-game, single-season, and career leaders. The Black Knights represent the United States Military Academy in the NCAA's Patriot League.

Army began competing in intercollegiate baseball in 1890. These lists are updated through the end of the 2025 season.

== Batting Average ==
Career (Min. 200 AB)
Rk	Player	AVG	Seasons
1	Glenn Donelin	.378	1988 1989 1990
2	Bill Mullee	.369	1993 1994 1995 1996
3	Shaun Salmon	.362	1997 1998 1999 2000
4	Paul Divis	.360	1978 1979 1980 1981
	Kenny Smith	.360	1965 1966 1967
6	Cole White	.359	2005 2006 2007 2008
7	Kevin McKague	.356	2008 2009 2010 2011 2012
8	Joey Henshaw	.349	2008 2009 2010 2011
9	Ross Friedrick	.345	2020 2021 2022 2023
10	Josh Holden	.341	2001 2002 2003
	Tom Cascino	.341	1984 1985 1986 1987

Season (Min. 50 AB)
Rk	Player	AVG	Season
1	Tom Cascino	.430	1986
2	Mike Scioletti	.415	1997
3	Nate Stone	.414	2004
4	Darin Souza	.412	1996
5	Cole White	.408	2007
6	Glenn Donelin	.406	1990
7	Kevin Dubrule	.405	2023
8	Roger Zailskas	.403	1960
9	Paul Divis	.400	1980
	Kenny Smith	.400	1965

== Home Runs ==
Career
Rk	Player	HR	Seasons
1	Sam Ruta	40	2021 2022 2023 2024
2	Clint Moore	35	2008 2009 2010 2011
3	Derek Berg	29	2021 2022 2023 2024
4	Cole White	28	2005 2006 2007 2008
5	Ross Friedrick	27	2020 2021 2022 2023
	William Parker	27	2023 2024 2025 2026
7	Mike Scioletti	26	1995 1996 1997 1998
8	Kevin McKague	24	2008 2009 2010 2011 2012
	Braden Golinski	24	2021 2022 2023 2024
10	Joey Henshaw	23	2008 2009 2010 2011
	Schuyler Williamson	23	2002 2003 2004 2005
	Lance Boyce	23	1990 1991 1992 1993

Season
Rk	Player	HR	Season
1	Ross Friedrick	17	2023
	Josiah Overbeek	17	2026
3	Sam Ruta	15	2024
	Derek Berg	15	2024
5	William Parker	13	2024
	Joey Henshaw	13	2009
	Braden Golinski	13	2023
	Sam Ruta	13	2023
9	Schuyler Williamson	12	2004
	Derek Berg	12	2023
	Mike Scioletti	12	1997

Single Game
Rk	Player	HR	Season	Opponent
1	Clint Moore	3	2011	Lafayette
	Walker Gorham	3	2005	Lehigh

== Runs Batted In ==
Career
Rk	Player	RBI	Seasons
1	Sam Ruta	187	2021 2022 2023 2024
2	Clint Moore	185	2008 2009 2010 2011
3	Kevin McKague	183	2008 2009 2010 2011 2012
4	Mike Scioletti	152	1995 1996 1997 1998
5	Kevin Dubrule	147	2020 2021 2022 2023
6	William Parker	145	2023 2024 2025 2026
7	Milan Dinga	139	2004 2005 2006 2007
	Joey Henshaw	139	2008 2009 2010 2011
9	Anthony Giachin	137	2018 2019 2020 2021
10	Ross Friedrick	129	2020 2021 2022 2023

Season
Rk	Player	RBI	Season
1	Joey Henshaw	75	2009
2	Kevin Dubrule	68	2023
3	Anthony Giachin	67	2019
	Mike Scioletti	67	1997
5	Clint Moore	65	2009
6	William Parker	62	2024
7	Ross Friedrick	59	2023
8	Sam Ruta	58	2023
9	Nate Stone	53	2004
10	Sam Ruta	53	2024

Single Game
Rk	Player	RBI	Season	Opponent
1	Anthony Giachin	8	2019	Air Force
	Mike Scioletti	8	1997	New York Tech
	Dan Kirk	8	1987	Brooklyn
	William Parker	8	2024	Bucknell
	Sam Ruta	8	2024	Holy Cross

== Runs ==
Career
Rk	Player	R	Seasons
1	Zach Price	174	2009 2010 2011 2012
	Clint Moore	174	2008 2009 2010 2011
3	Derek Berg	169	2021 2022 2023 2024
4	Milan Dinga	165	2004 2005 2006 2007
	Sam Ruta	165	2021 2022 2023 2024
6	Jacob Hurtubise	163	2017 2018 2019 2020
7	Kevin McKague	159	2008 2009 2010 2011 2012
8	Chris Barr	155	2022 2023 2024 2025 2026
9	Schuyler Williamson	137	2002 2003 2004 2005
10	Josh White	132	2016 2017 2018 2019
	Bryan Price	132	1995 1996 1997 1998

Season
Rk	Player	R	Season
1	Jacob Hurtubise	71	2019
2	Derek Berg	66	2023
3	Bryan Price	65	1997
4	Derek Berg	60	2024
5	Zach Price	59	2009
	Sam Ruta	59	2023
7	Clint Moore	58	2009
	Ross Friedrick	58	2023
9	Jacob Hurtubise	56	2018
10	Braden Golinski	54	2024

Single Game
Rk	Player	R	Season	Opponent
1	Several Players	5	Most recent: Chris Barr, 2026 vs. Wagner	

== Hits ==
Career
Rk	Player	H	Seasons
1	Kevin McKague	283	2008 2009 2010 2011 2012
2	Milan Dinga	257	2004 2005 2006 2007
3	Zach Price	241	2009 2010 2011 2012
4	Sam Ruta	238	2021 2022 2023 2024
5	Clint Moore	233	2008 2009 2010 2011
6	Cole White	232	2005 2006 2007 2008
7	Jon Rosoff	230	2015 2016 2017 2018
8	Kevin Dubrule	225	2020 2021 2022 2023
9	Anthony Giachin	211	2018 2019 2020 2021
10	Shaun Salmon	209	1997 1998 1999 2000

Season
Rk	Player	H	Season
1	Kevin Dubrule	92	2023
2	Ross Friedrick	84	2023
3	Kyle Scogin	81	2005
4	Joey Henshaw	80	2009
5	Kevin McKague	79	2009
6	Kevin Dubrule	77	2022
7	Jacob Hurtubise	75	2019
	Kevin McKague	75	2012
	Milan Dinga	75	2005
	Nate Stone	75	2004

Single Game
Rk	Player	H	Season	Opponent
1	John McCarthy	6	2017	Bucknell
	Clint Moore	6	2008	Sacred Heart
	Eric Wolf	6	1992	Fordham

== Stolen Bases ==
Career
Rk	Player	SB	Seasons
1	Jacob Hurtubise	105	2017 2018 2019 2020
2	Harold Earls	77	2012 2013 2014 2015
	Chris Barr	77	2022 2023 2024 2025 2026
4	Miguel Gastellum	75	1999 2000 2001 2002
5	Josh Holden	70	2001 2002 2003
6	Lance Boyce	60	1990 1991 1992 1993
7	Zach Price	55	2009 2010 2011 2012
8	Schuyler Williamson	53	2002 2003 2004 2005
9	Jim Bagwell	50	1978 1979 1980 1981
10	Gary Donaldson	48	1980 1981 1982 1983
	Paul Divis	48	1978 1979 1980 1981

Season
Rk	Player	SB	Season
1	Jacob Hurtubise	45	2019
2	Jacob Hurtubise	42	2018
3	Hunter Meade	32	2022
	Chris Barr	32	2025
5	Miguel Gastellum	31	2001
6	Josh Holden	27	2003
7	Miguel Gastellum	26	2002
	Harold Earls	26	2014
	Jim Bagwell	26	1981
10	Chris Barr	25	2026
	Andre Walden	25	2019
	Lance Boyce	25	1992

Single Game
Rk	Player	SB	Season	Opponent
1	Jacob Hurtubise	6	2018	Bucknell

== Earned Run Average ==
Career (Min. 75 IP)
Rk	Player	ERA	Seasons
1	Barry DeBolt	1.62	1964 1965 1966
2	Doug Rogers	1.72	1967 1968 1969
3	Mel Brinkley	1.90	1972 1973
4	Bob Kewley	2.09	1959 1960 1961
5	Nick Hill	2.20	2004 2005 2006 2007
6	Eric Pedersen	2.31	1968 1969 1970
7	Steve Reich	2.49	1990 1991 1992 1993
8	Alex Robinett	2.53	2012 2013 2014 2015
9	Monte Jones	2.63	2003 2004 2005 2006
10	Lance Boyce	2.66	1990 1991 1992 1993

Season (Min. 40 IP)
Rk	Player	ERA	Season
1	Joe Fowler	0.57	1968
2	Ron Petricka	0.98	1973
3	Steve Reich	1.11	1990
4	Nick Hill	1.21	2005
5	Barry DeBolt	1.26	1966
6	Bob Kewley	1.41	1961
7	Barry DeBolt	1.50	1965
8	Mel Brinkley	1.70	1973
9	Nick Hill	1.91	2007
10	Alex Robinett	2.05	2014

== Strikeouts ==
Career
Rk	Player	K	Seasons
1	Nick Hill	336	2004 2005 2006 2007
2	Alex Robinett	281	2012 2013 2014 2015
3	Steve Reich	259	1990 1991 1992 1993
4	Barry DeBolt	255	1964 1965 1966
5	Chris Rowley	216	2010 2011 2012 2013
6	Daniel Burggraaf	215	2016 2017 2018 2019
7	Bob Kewley	214	1959 1960 1961
8	Tyler Giovinco	211	2016 2017 2018 2019
9	Justin Kashner	198	2002 2003 2004 2005
10	Matt Cini	194	1997 1998 1999 2000

Season
Rk	Player	K	Season
1	Bill Shepherd	103	1957
2	Barry DeBolt	102	1966
3	Nick Hill	100	2007
4	Bob Kewley	98	1960
5	Matt Ball	93	2018
6	Alex Robinett	92	2015
7	Nick Hill	90	2005
8	Barry DeBolt	89	1964
9	Connelly Early	88	2022
	Steve Reich	88	1993
	John Brudvig	88	1981

Single Game
Rk	Player	K	Season	Opponent
1	Alex Robinett	21	2015	Air Force
