= Nicholas Hill =

Nicholas Hill may refer to:

- Nicholas Hill (printer) (died c. 1553), native of the Low Countries who came to England in 1519
- Nicholas Hill (Virginia Burgess) (1603–1675), politician and planter in the English colony of Virginia
- Nicholas Hill, 9th Marquess of Downshire (born 1959), British peer, landowner, and accountant
- Nicholas Hill (scientist) (1570–1610), English natural philosopher
- Nick Hill (born 1985), American football player
- Nick Hill (baseball) (born 1985), baseball pitcher
- Nick Awde (Nick Awde Hill, born 1961), British writer, artist and singer-songwriter
- Nic Hill (born 1981), American film director
- Nicky Hill (born 1981), English footballer
- Nicholas Hill (priest), Dean of St Patrick’s Cathedral, Dublin, 1428–1457

== See also ==
- Nicolas Hill, English musician with the alt folk band Flyte
