= Lanford =

Lanford may refer to:

- Lanford Monroe (1950–2000), American realist painter and sculptor
- Lanford Wilson (born 1937), American playwright
- Sam Lanford (1886–1970), American baseball player
- Oscar Eramus Lanford III (1940–2013), American mathematician

== See also ==
- Roseanne, set in the fictional town of Lanford, Illinois
