= Roxbury Center =

- U.S. National Register of Historic Places
- U.S. Historic district
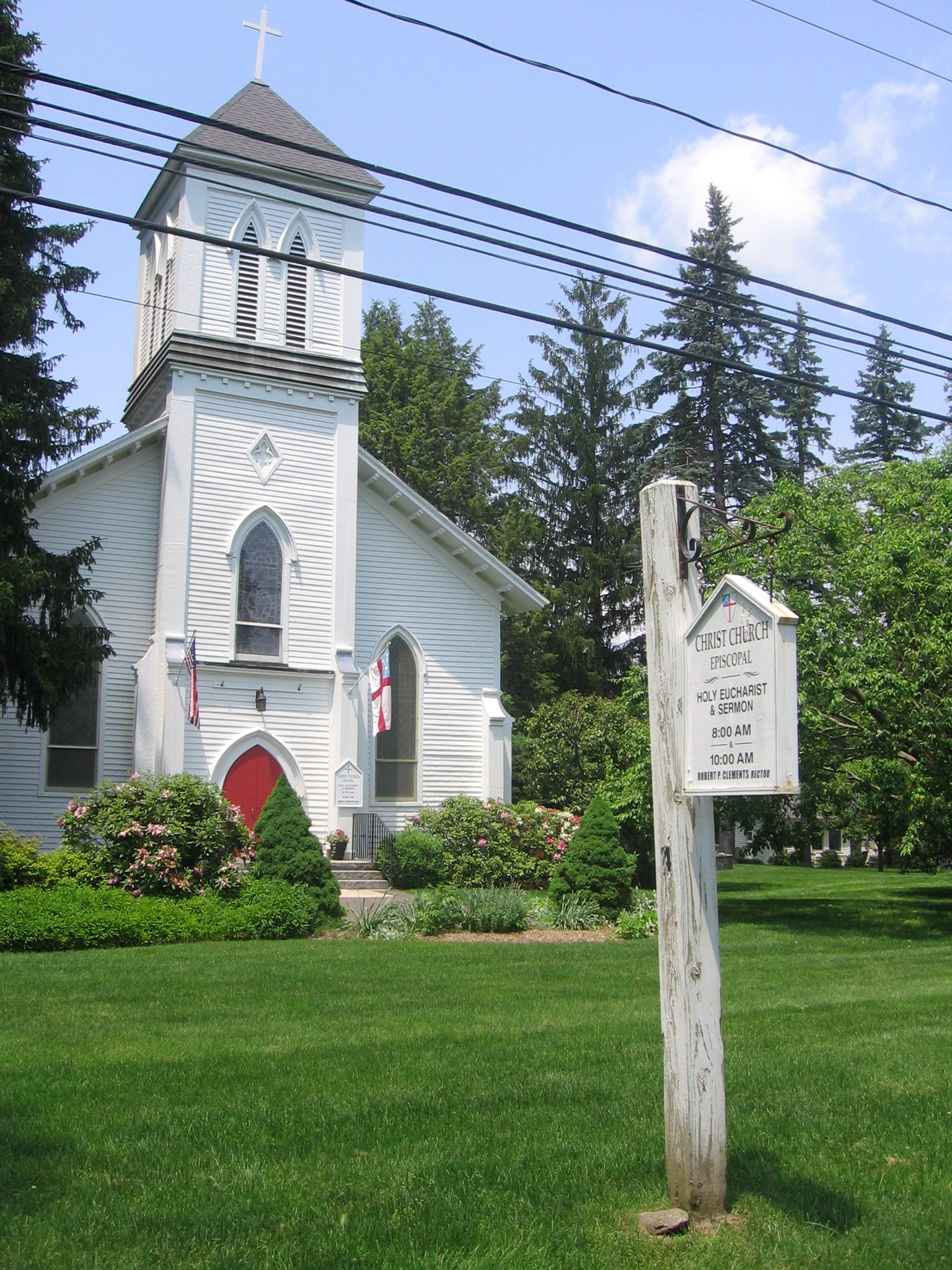

- Location within Connecticut Location within the United States
- Location: Connecticut 67, Weller's Bridge Road, South and Church Streets, Roxbury, Connecticut
- Coordinates: 41°33′20″N 73°18′28″W
- Area: 217 acres (88 ha)
- Architect: Multiple
- Architectural style: Mixed (more Than 2 Styles From Different Periods)
- NRHP reference No.: 83001271
- Added to NRHP: July 28, 1983

Roxbury Center is the central village of Roxbury, Connecticut. Centered at the junction of Connecticut Routes 67 and 317, it has been the center of town civic life since the mid-18th century. The village was listed on the National Register of Historic Places in 1983.

== Description and history ==
Roxbury is a rural hill community in northwestern Connecticut, just east of New Milford. Originally part of Woodbury, it was separately incorporated in 1796. It was established as a separate parish of Woodbury in the 1730s, with a church built at a small settlement southeast of the present town center. The oldest building in the current center is a 1740 tavern, later modified to have Greek Revival features. It became the dominant village in the community beginning the 1790s, and its architecture is dominated by that period and the following 50–60 years. One of the town's most famous native sons, American Revolutionary War hero Seth Warner, is buried beneath an obelisk on the town green.

The historic district is organized mainly around the triangular Junction of Weller's Bridge Road, North Street, and Church Street, with South Street extending South just West of that Junction. It covers more than 200 acres (81 ha) of surrounding land, including land cleared for agriculture, which set the village apart from its surroundings. Most of the buildings included in the district are on Weller's Bridge Road or Church Street, the majority of them residences in the Federal or Greek Revival style. Examples of later Victorian or Colonial Revival style are also present. Prominent public buildings include the Roxbury Public Library, built in 1937, the mid-19th century town hall, and two churches.

== See also ==
- National Register of Historic Places listings in Litchfield County, Connecticut
