= Bridgewater, Connecticut =

- Town
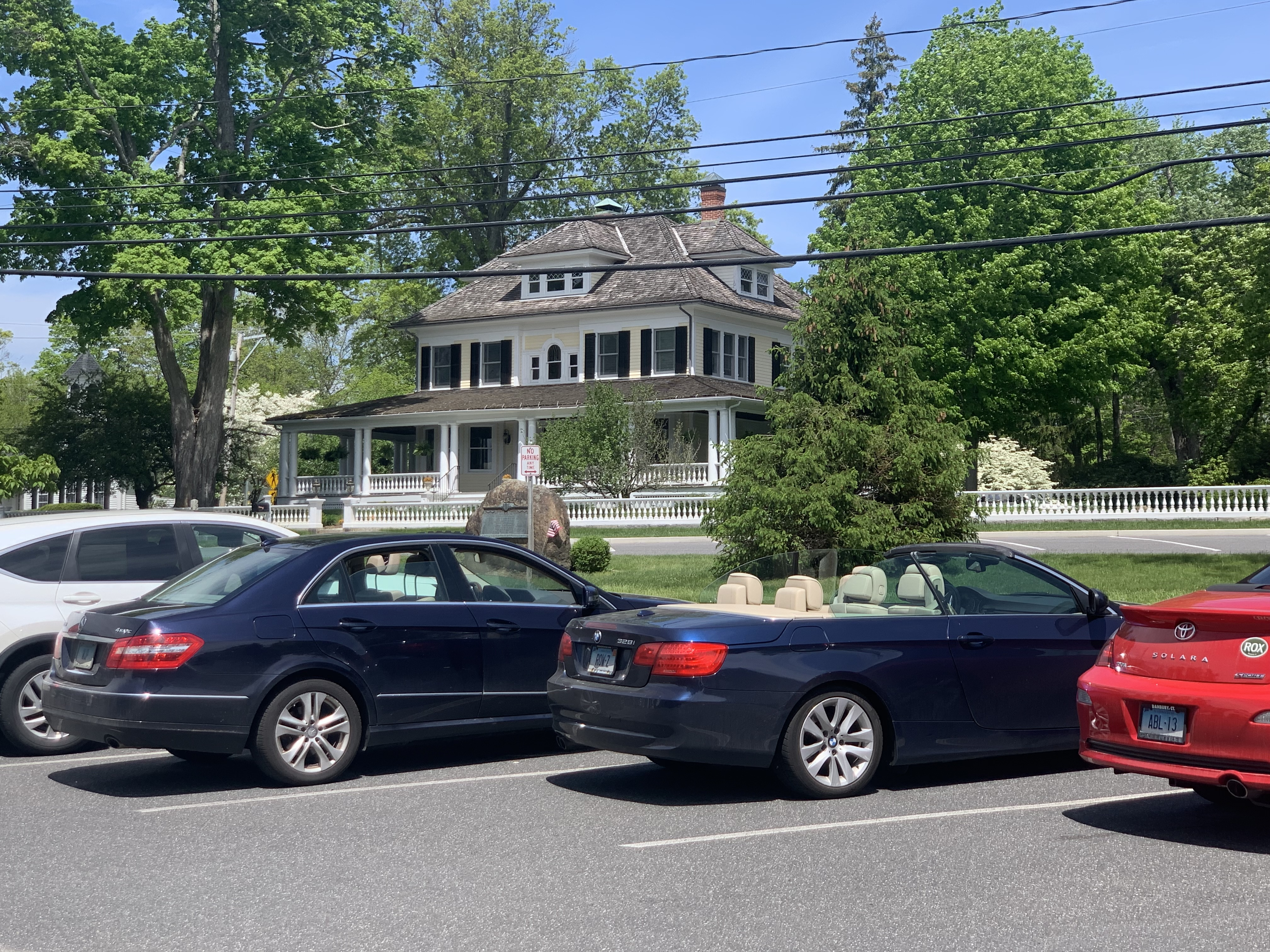
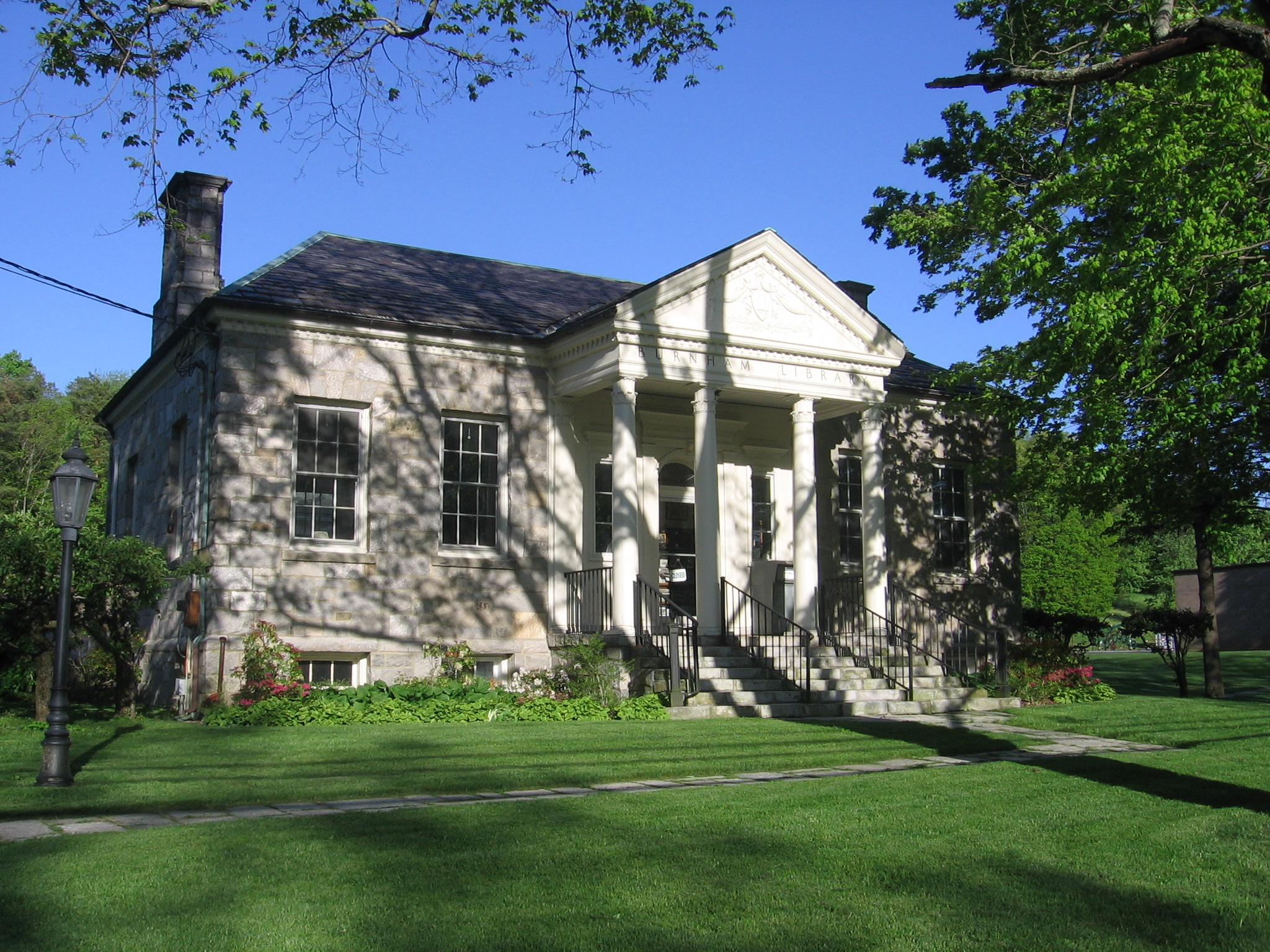
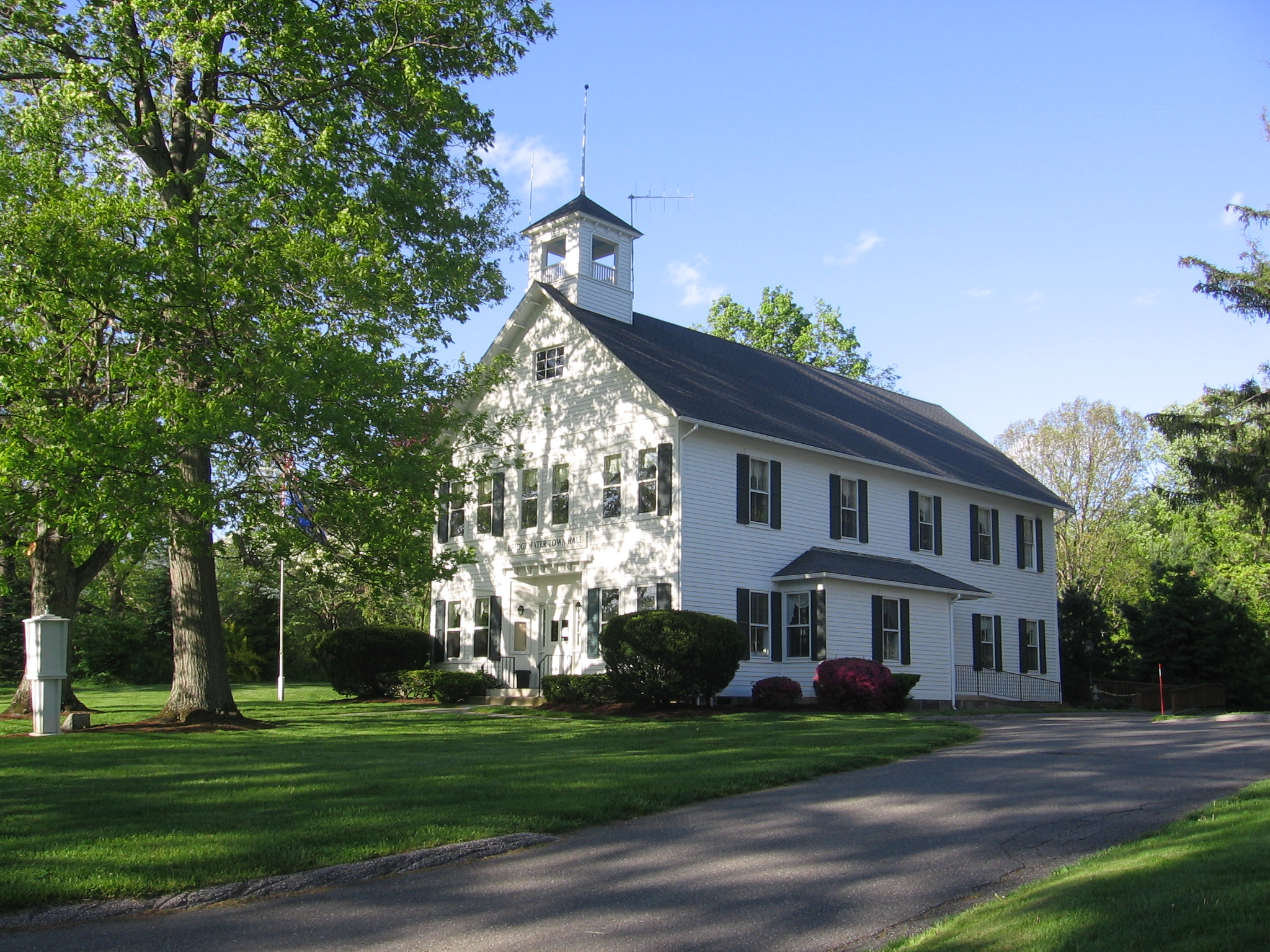
- Town Center Burnham Library Town Hall

- Seal

- Coordinates: 41°31′33″N 73°21′39″W
- Country: United States
- U.S. state: Connecticut
- County: Litchfield
- Region: Western CT
- Incorporated: 1856

Government
  - Type: Selectman-town meeting
  - First selectman: Curtis Read (D)
  - Selectmen: Laszlo Pinter (R); Alan Brown (D)

Area
  - Total: 17.31 sq mi (44.82 km^{2})
  - Land: 16.39 sq mi (42.46 km^{2})
  - Water: 0.91 sq mi (2.36 km^{2})
- Elevation: 715 ft (218 m)

Population (2020)
  - Total: 1,662
  - Density: 101.4/sq mi (39.14/km^{2})
- Time zone: UTC−5 (Eastern)
  - Summer (DST): UTC−4 (Eastern)
- ZIP Code: 06752
- Area codes: 860/959
- FIPS code: 09-08210
- GNIS feature ID: 0213397
- Website: bridgewater-ct.gov

Bridgewater is a town in Litchfield County, Connecticut, United States. The population was 1,662 at the 2020 census, a decline from the figure of 1,727 tabulated in 2010. The town is part of the Western Connecticut Planning Region.

Bridgewater is well known as being a weekend getaway for wealthy New Yorkers, due to its scenic wooded areas, location on the banks of Lake Lillinonah and proximity to New York City. Bridgewater was one of the last remaining dry towns (Eastford is still a dry town) in Connecticut until voters approved the sale of alcohol in a 2014 referendum, by a 660–246 vote. The Bridgewater Country Fair is a popular annual event held every August, attracting visitors from all over New England and the Tri-state area.

== Geography ==
Bridgewater is in southwestern Litchfield County and is bordered by Fairfield County to the south and New Haven County to the southeast. According to the United States Census Bureau, the town has a total area of 17.3 square miles (44.8 km^{2}), of which 16.4 square miles (42.5 km^{2}) are land and 0.93 square miles (2.4 km^{2}), or 5.27%, are water. Bridgewater is located on the northeastern bank of the Housatonic River, on a section that is impounded to form Lake Lillinonah. Danbury is 13 miles (21 km) to the southwest, and Waterbury is 20 miles (32 km) to the east.

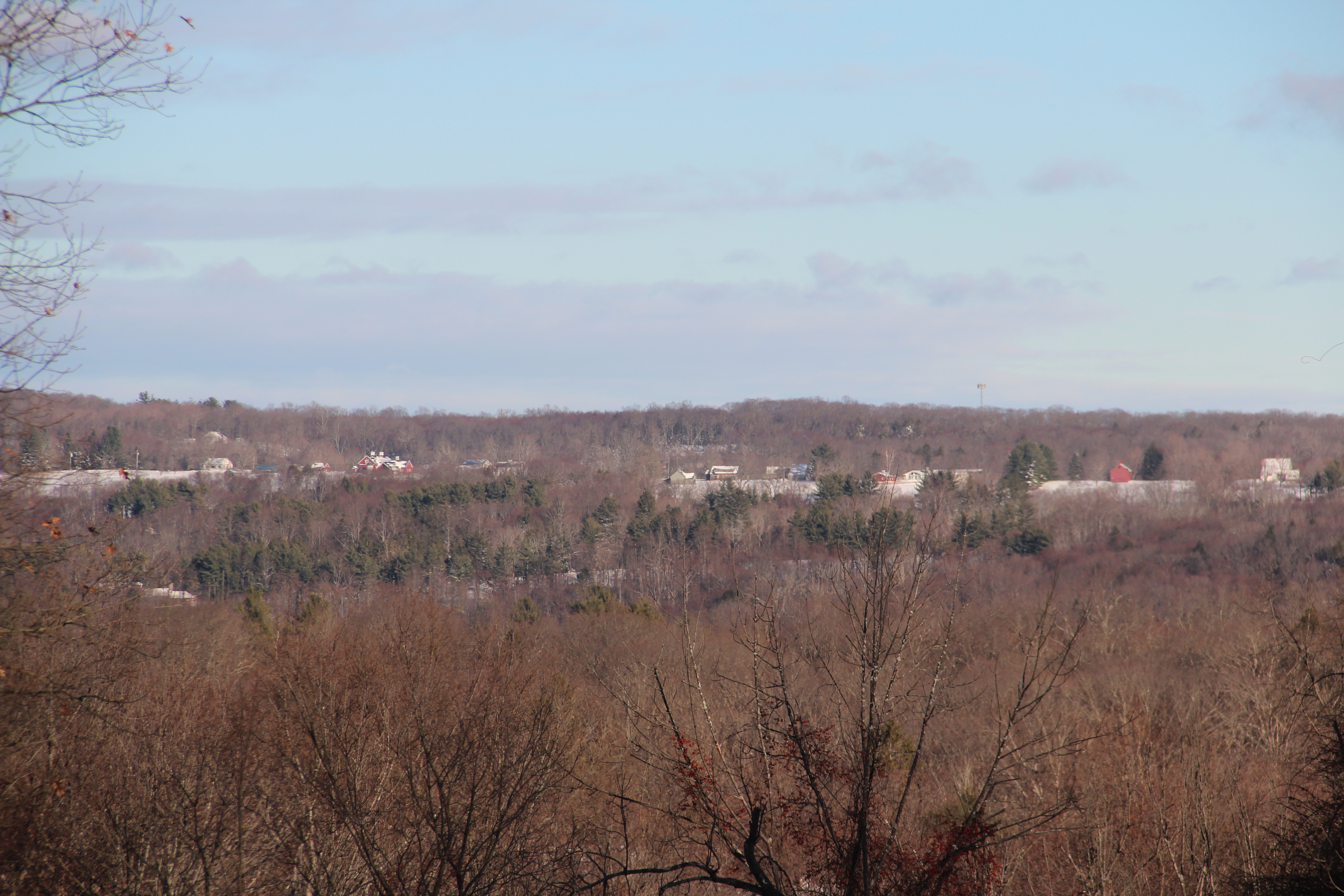
Bridgewater houses, farms, and fields, as seen from Brookfield, December 17, 2020

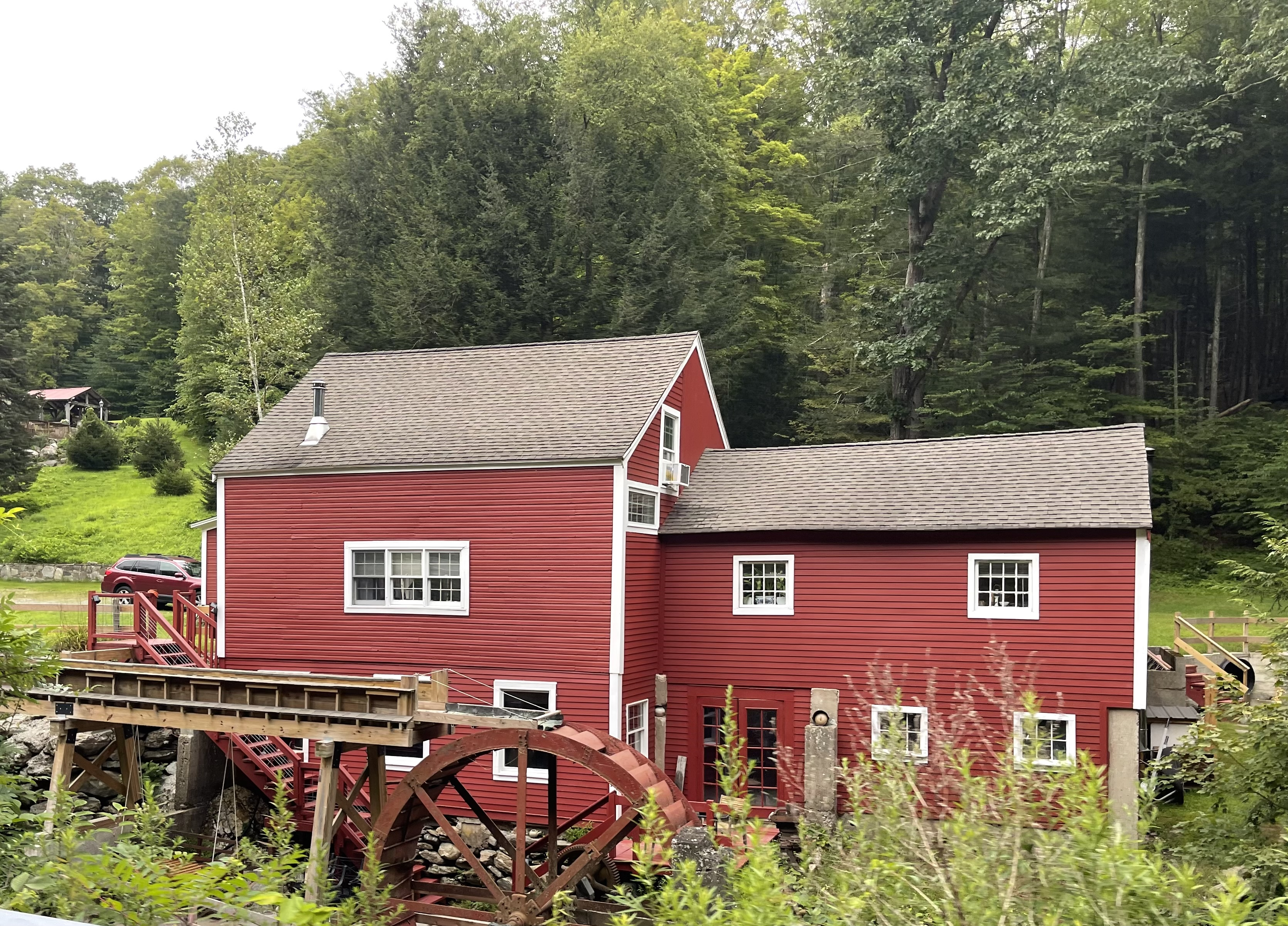
A water wheel in Bridgewater, Connecticut

== Demographics ==
Historical population
Census	Pop.	Note	%±
1850	815		—
1860	1,048		28.6%
1870	877		−16.3%
1880	708		−19.3%
1890	617		−12.9%
1900	649		5.2%
1910	600		−7.6%
1920	481		−19.8%
1930	432		−10.2%
1940	537		24.3%
1950	639		19.0%
1960	898		40.5%
1970	1,277		42.2%
1980	1,563		22.4%
1990	1,654		5.8%
2000	1,824		10.3%
2010	1,727		−5.3%
2020	1,662		−3.8%
U.S. Decennial Census

As of the census of 2000, there were 1,824 people, 703 households, and 525 families residing in the town. The population density was 112.4 inhabitants per square mile (43.4/km^{2}). There were 779 housing units at an average density of 48.0 per square mile (18.5/km^{2}). The racial makeup of the town was 97.53% White, 0.93% African American, 0.05% Native American, 0.71% Asian, 0.11% from other races, and 0.66% from two or more races. Hispanic or Latino of any race were 0.49% of the population.

There were 703 households, out of which 29.4% had children under the age of 18 living with them, 67.4% were married couples living together, 5.5% had a female householder with no husband present, and 25.2% were non-families. 21.1% of all households were made up of individuals, and 8.1% had someone living alone who was 65 years of age or older. The average household size was 2.55 and the average family size was 2.96.

In the town, the population was spread out, with 22.1% under the age of 18, 4.9% from 18 to 24, 23.8% from 25 to 44, 35.9% from 45 to 64, and 13.3% who were 65 years of age or older. The median age was 45 years. For every 100 females, there were 98.0 males. For every 100 females age 18 and over, there were 95.5 males.

The median income for a household in the town was $80,420, and the median income for a family was $94,720. Males had a median income of $61,750 versus $40,455 for females. The per capita income for the town was $42,505. About 2.3% of families and 4.1% of the population were below the poverty line, including 4.8% of those under age 18 and 0.8% of those age 65 or over.

Voter registration and party enrollment as of October 26, 2021
Party	Active voters	Inactive voters	Total voters	Percentage
Democratic	466	3	469	32.71%
Republican	417	9	426	29.71%
Unaffiliated	513	7	520	36.26%
Minor Parties	19	0	19	1.32%
Total	1,415	19	1,434	100%

Presidential Election Results
Year	Democratic	Republican	Third Parties
2020	54.1% 667	44.5% 549	1.4% 17
2016	45.6% 518	50.1% 571	4.3% 50
2012	44.4% 472	54.5% 580	1.1% 12
2008	49.9% 587	49.3% 580	0.8% 9
2004	44.4% 521	53.5% 628	2.1% 25
2000	45.3% 508	48.6% 545	6.1% 69
1996	42.5% 439	44.6% 461	12.9% 132
1992	36.2% 411	39.5% 448	24.3% 276
1988	40.2% 425	59.1% 624	0.7% 7
1984	33.3% 328	66.4% 655	0.3% 3
1980	31.4% 285	52.5% 477	16.1% 146
1976	41.3% 325	58.2% 458	0.5% 3
1972	32.9% 248	64.8% 488	2.3% 17
1968	34.6% 229	62.7% 415	2.7% 18
1964	62.4% 378	37.6% 228	0.00% 0
1960	29.6% 166	70.4% 394	0.00% 0
1956	22.8% 102	77.2% 345	0.00% 0

== Transportation ==
Bridgewater is served by two state highways: Route 67 running east–west in the northern part of town, and Route 133 running north–south. Route 67 leads northwest to New Milford and east to Roxbury, while Route 133 leads south across the Housatonic River into Brookfield. The Danbury Metro-North Railroad station is located roughly 10 miles from the town center.

== Local media ==
- Waterbury Republican-American, a Waterbury-based independent daily newspaper
- The News-Times, a Danbury-based daily newspaper
- The Greater New Milford Spectrum, a MediaNews Group-owned weekly paper
- Voices, a local newspaper serving Southbury, Middlebury, Oxford, Seymour, Naugatuck, Woodbury, Bethelhem, New Preston, Washington, Washington Depot, Roxbury, Bridgewater, Monroe, Sandy Hook and Newtown

== Education ==
Regional School District 12 is the area school district. Residents are served by REACH Preschool in Washington, Burnham Elementary School in Bridgewater, and Shepaug Valley School (secondary school) in Washington.

=== The Burnham Library ===
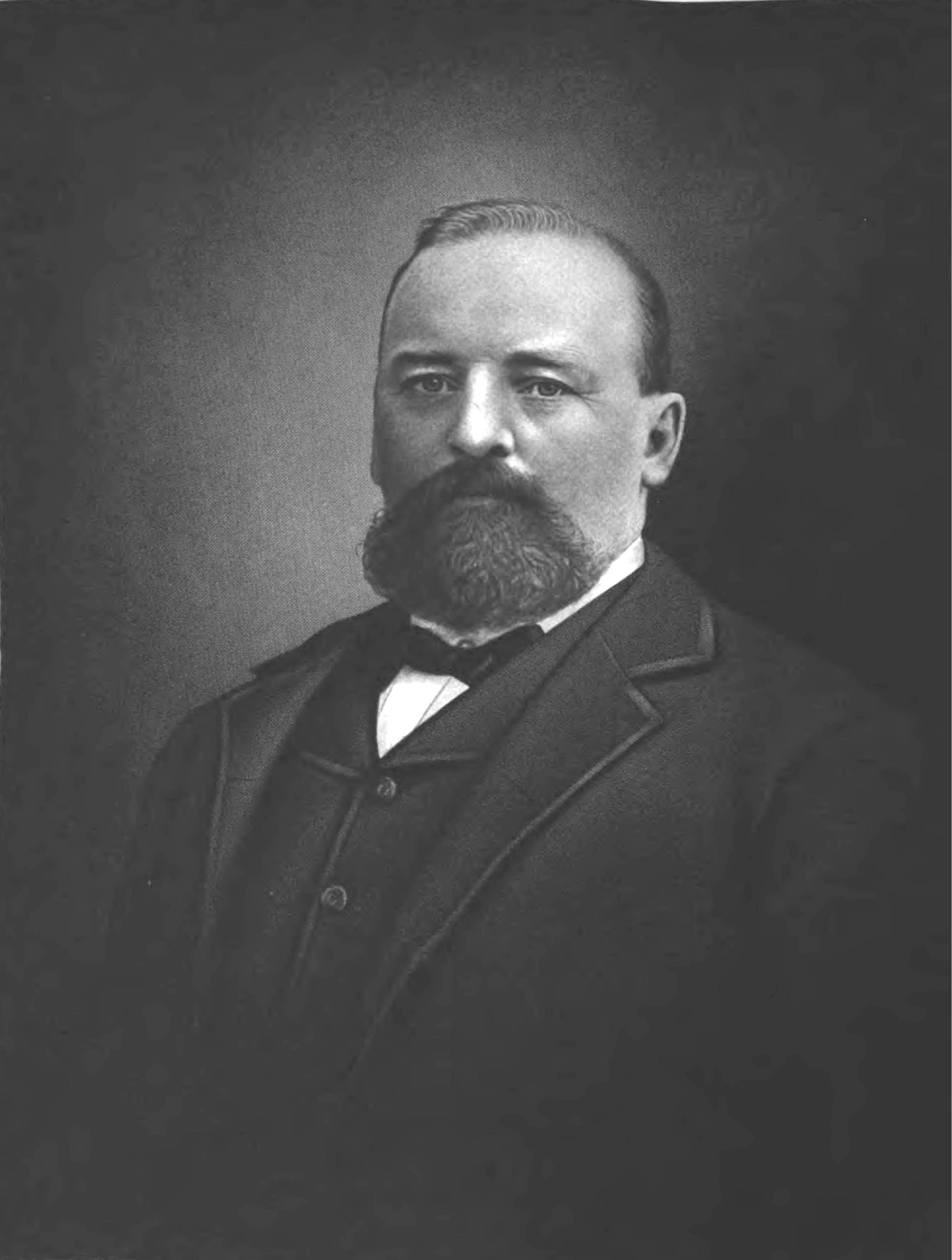
William Dixon Burnham c. 1919

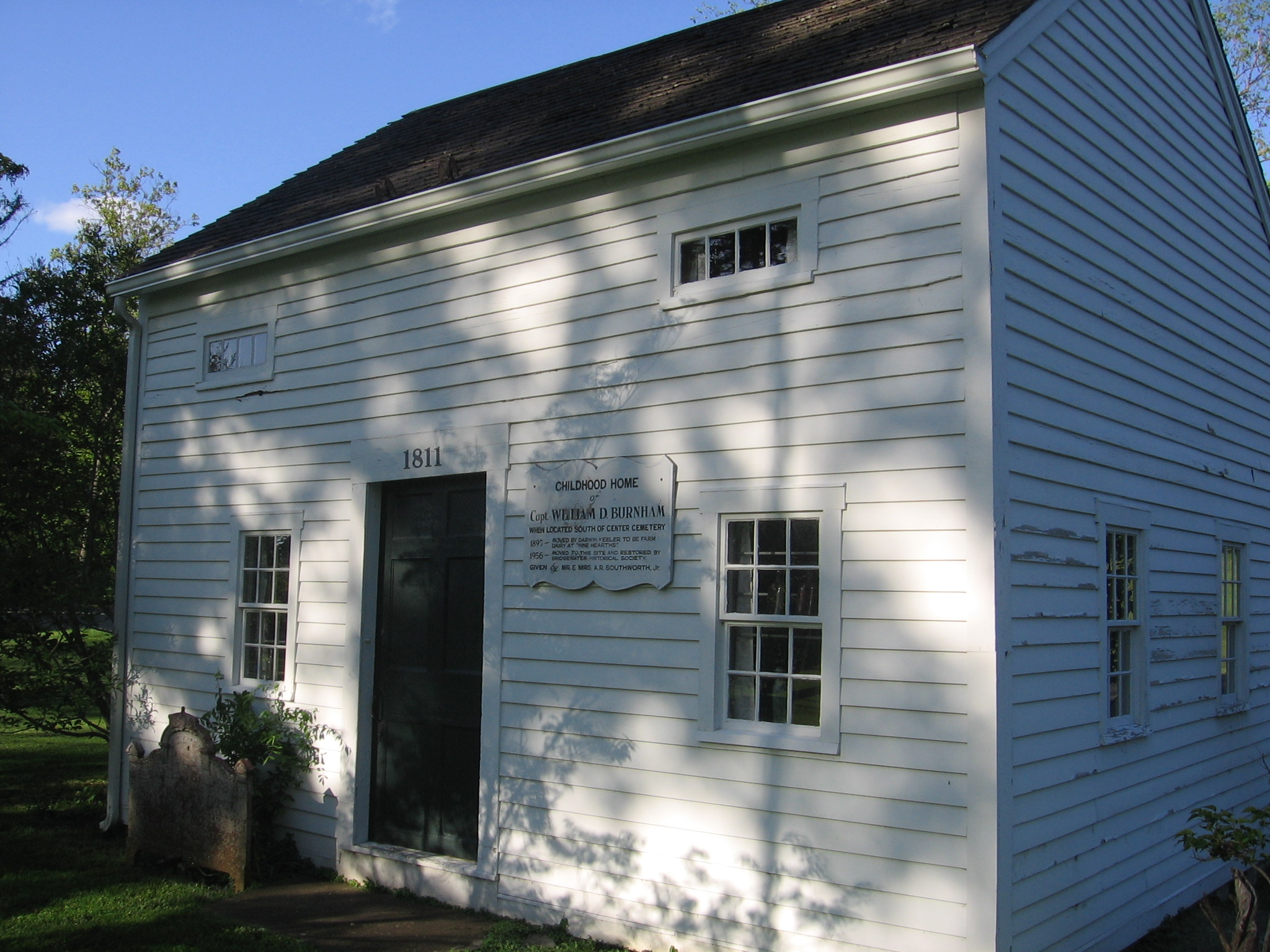
Captain Burnham's boyhood home

In 1904, the Bridgewater Library Association was established, succeeding previous lending libraries operated by individuals in town. In 1909 room for library purposes was set aside in recently built town hall. A bequest from William Dixon Burnham, a native who made his fortune in shipping, allowed a Greek Revival style building to be erected from 1925 to 1926, using Mine Hill granite from nearby Roxbury. The dedication took place on August 26, 1926.

By the early 1960s, the library's two floors were finally becoming cramped. With the death of town resident Van Wyck Brooks, a biographer and critic, a "Van Wyck Brooks Memorial Fund was set up to raise money for a library wing in his name. The effort, however, flopped, despite support from such celebrities as Pearl Buck and Archibald MacLeish. Just enough money was raised for a bust of the author and a display of some of his memorabilia. His desk, books, and other items can be found on display in the library's biography section. The fund-raising committee disbanded in 1972, but a year later, a surprising source of funding became known.

Charles E. Piggott, a hermit, misanthrope, and miser living in a Los Angeles slum, died in 1973. As a bulldozer operator razed the shack that had been Piggott's home, the operator happened to notice something shiny. It was a bottle with Piggott's holographic will inside.

Despite apparently having no discernible connection with Bridgewater, Piggott left the fund $300,000—money from careful investments over the years. The state of California contested the will and the library hired a lawyer, at considerable cost, to defend the bequest. Eventually, the lawyer won the case and the library got $210,000.

By 1980, the Van Wyck Brooks Memorial Wing was dedicated, doubling the size of the library.

Burton Bernstein, a longtime town resident, looked into why Piggott would leave money to the library, then wrote an article on the bequest, which appeared in the December 18, 1978, issue of The New Yorker. Piggott, as it turned out, had been a voracious reader on any number of subjects and loved public libraries (which are, after all, free). Bernstein believes that Piggott came across Van Wyck Brooks' The Flowering of New England, which describes the hermit Henry David Thoreau. Piggott may have compared himself to Thoreau, or saw wisdom in some of Thoreau's ideas as presented by Brooks. Perhaps this quote stuck in his mind: "The mass of men led lives of quiet desperation... Did they not know that the wisest had always lived, with respect to comforts and luxuries, a life more simple and meager than the poor?... Poverty had given him all this wealth."

Piggott heard of the Van Wyck Brooks Memorial Fund, recognized the name, and, Bernstein believes, decided to contribute.

== Notable people ==
- Woody Allen (born 1935), film director, writer, actor, and comedian
- Cathie Black (born 1944), media executive and New York City Schools Chancellor
- Dan Briody, author
- Van Wyck Brooks (1886–1963), literary critic, biographer, and historian
- Philip Evergood (1901–1973), artist
- Mia Farrow (born 1945), actress
- Louise Fitzhugh (1928–1974), author of children's books including Harriet the Spy
- Susie Gharib (born 1950), journalist
- Kathy Godfrey (1915–1981), talk show host
- Susan Kinsolving, author and poet
- E.G. Marshall (1914–1998), actor
- Lanford Monroe (1950–2000), artist
- Mike Nichols (1931–2014), director and comedian
- Drake Olson (born 1955), racing driver
- Lee Pockriss (1924–2011), songwriter
- Diane Sawyer (born 1945), television broadcast journalist
- Charles Seeger (1886–1979), musicologist and composer
- Luman Hamlin Weller (1833–1914), U.S. Representative from Iowa
- Teresa Wright (1918–2005), actress
