= Briody =

Briody, from Old Irish personal name Ó Bruaideadha, is a surname. Notable people with the surname include:

- Fatty Briody (1858–1903), American baseball player
- Dan Briody, American journalist and author, active 1999–present

== See also ==
- Brody (name)
