= Shepaug Valley School =

Location
- 159 South Street; Washington, Connecticut 06793; United States; 41°36′06″N 73°18′22″W

Information
- Type: Public
- Established: 1969 (57 years ago)
- School district: Regional School District 12
- CEEB code: 070830
- Principal: Silvia Ouellette
- Faculty: 109
- Teaching staff: 53.90 (FTE)
- Grades: 6 to 12
- Enrollment: 496 (2023–2024)
- Student to teacher ratio: 9.20
- Colors: White and Navy Blue
- Athletics conference: Berkshire League; CIAC Class S
- Team name: Shepaug Spartans
- Website: www.region-12.org/our-schools/shepaug-valley-school-6-12

Shepaug Valley School (SVS) is a seven-year (grades 6–12) public, coeducational middle and high school in Washington, Connecticut. Shepaug Valley School is the only public secondary school of Regional School District 12, which serves Washington, Bridgewater, and Roxbury.

It was formerly two separate schools, Shepaug Valley Middle School (SVMS) and Shepaug Valley High School (SVHS). It was chosen as Connecticut's only public high school to receive the blue-ribbon school in 1998, and one of two in New England.

== History ==
Prior to 2000 the school received block scheduling. In 2012 the superintendent of the school district, Patricia Cosentino, wanted to establish a "flexible schedule" (using elements of both block and traditional scheduling) regime for both the middle and high schools, and therefore end block scheduling for high school students. The high school parent council opposed the plan. In 2012 there were about 320 students in the high school, and the enrollment was decreasing. 10 years later in 2022, there has been a continued decline in the amount of attendees at the institution, with a total enrollment of 434 students across grades 6–12.

== Ground plan ==
Shepaug is a one-floor building housed on an 80-acre (320,000 m^{2}) campus. Since the space is shared with students of Shepaug Valley Middle School, who have their own wing in the building, high school students take academic courses in their own section of the building, a long hallway off of which classrooms branch.

The rest of the building is shared between middle and high school students. It consists of a cafeteria, a large, central cavity known as "the mall", a library resource center with more than 10,000 print volumes, gymnasium, planetarium, swimming pool, band and choir practice rooms, fine arts, auto, and woodworking shops, and a professionally equipped theatre.

Outdoors on campus, there is a peace pole and reflection area, a swing-set, a pond, and a memorial to former student Tam Farrow. Shepaug also hosts soccer and field hockey fields, a competitive cross country trail, and a track that was recently under renovation.

== Athletics ==
Wins in CIAC State Championships
Sport	Class	Year(s)
Baseball	S	1973, 1987, 1995, 1999
Basketball (boys)	V	2025
Cross country (boys)	S	1984, 1997, 1998, 1999, 2002, 2003, 2004, 2010, 2014, 2015
Cross country (girls)	S	1980, 1981, 1982, 1985, 1986
Field hockey	S	2001, 2002, 2024
Soccer (boys)	S	2024
Softball	S	1978, 1983, 1992
Tennis (boys)	S	1987
Track and field (outdoor, boys)	S	1999
Track and field (outdoor, girls)	S	1986

== Notable alumni ==
- Stephen C. Reich, United States Army Major killed during Operation Red Wings
- Evan Scribner, former MLB player (San Diego Padres, Oakland Athletics)
- Joe Moravsky, athlete and reality television contestant
- Sadie Dupuis, lead vocals and guitar in band Speedy Ortiz
