= Sullivan East High School =

Location
- 4180 Weaver Pike; Bluff City, Tennessee 37618; United States
- Coordinates: 36°30′20″N 82°12′32″W

Information
- Type: Public high school
- Founded: 1968
- School district: Sullivan County Schools
- Superintendent: David Cox
- Principal: Andy Hare
- Teaching staff: 60.00 (on an FTE basis)
- Grades: 9–12
- Enrollment: 827 (2023–2024)
- Student to teacher ratio: 13.78
- Colors: Red; White; Blue
- Athletics conference: Three Rivers Conference
- Nickname: Patriots
- Website: www.sullivank12.net/ehs/

Sullivan East High School is a 9th–12th grade public high school located in Bluff City, Tennessee, United States.

== History ==
The school opened after the consolidation of Bluff City High School, Mary Hughes High School, and Holston Valley High School.

In October 2002, Sullivan East High School was forced to temporarily close its doors for about six weeks and underwent $600,000 worth of repairs when some students became ill and several classrooms tested positive for black mold. The cause was later determined to be poorly insulated cold water piping. Classes were held in the skyboxes at nearby Bristol Motor Speedway until the necessary repairs were completed.

In January 2020, Bluff City Middle School, Mary Hughes Middle School, and Holston Valley Middle School consolidated to form Sullivan East Middle School. Upon completion the eighth grade East Middle students enroll at Sullivan East High School.

In 2021, West Ridge High School opened. This combined Sullivan North, Sullivan South, and Sullivan Central into one high school.

== Notable alumni ==
- Nick Hill, professional baseball player
- Pamela L. Reeves, Federal Judge
- Hunter Stratton, professional baseball player
