= Regional School District 12 =

School district in Connecticut, United States

Address
- 11A School Street Washington Depot, Connecticut, 6794; United States

District information
- Type: Public
- Grades: PreK–12
- NCES District ID: 0903530

Students and staff
- Students: 686
- Teachers: 75.67
- Staff: 135.09
- Student–teacher ratio: 9.07

Other information
- Website: www.region-12.org

Regional School District 12 (RSD 12) is a school district headquartered in the Washington Depot area of Washington, Connecticut. It serves Washington, Bridgewater, and Roxbury.

In 2012 the district had 841 students.

== Schools ==
Secondary:

- Shepaug Valley School – Grades 6–12

Primary (all K-5):

- Burnham School (Bridgewater)
- Booth Free School (Roxbury)
- Washington Primary School (Washington)
