= 2023 Army Black Knights baseball team =

American college baseball season

2023 Army Black Knights baseball

Patriot League regular season and tournament champions

NCAA tournament
- Conference: Patriot League
- Record: 38–16 (21–4 Patriot)
- Head coach: Chris Tracz (1st season)
- Associate head coach: Mike Cole (1st season)
- Hitting coach: Franklin Jennings (1st season)
- Pitching coach: Jeremy Hileman (1st season)
- Home stadium: Doubleday Field

2023 Patriot League baseball standings
	Conf.						Overall
Team	W		L		T	PCT	W		L		T	PCT
Army ‍†‍‡‍^{y}	21	–	4	–	0	.840	37	–	16	–	0	.698
Navy ‍‍‍	14	–	11	–	0	.560	23	–	27	–	0	.460
Bucknell ‍‍‍	14	–	11	–	0	.560	23	–	22	–	1	.511
Lafayette ‍‍‍	10	–	15	–	0	.400	15	–	37	–	0	.288
Lehigh ‍‍‍	10	–	15	–	0	.400	24	–	36	–	0	.400
Holy Cross ‍‍‍	6	–	19	–	0	.240	16	–	35	–	0	.314
† – Conference champion ‡ – Tournament champion y – Invited to the NCAA Tournament; As of May 21, 2023; Rankings from D1Baseball

The 2023 Army Black Knights baseball team represented the United States Military Academy during the 2023 NCAA Division I baseball season. The Black Knights played their home games at Johnson Stadium at Doubleday Field as a member of the Patriot League. They were led by first-year head coach Chris Tracz.

Army won their fifth consecutive Patriot League tournament title and second consecutive regular season title, amassing a conference record of 21–4 in the regular season and going 4–1 in the tournament.

== Game log ==
2023 Army Black Knights Hawks baseball game log (38–16)
Regular season (38–16)

February (1–2)
Date	Opponent	Rank	Site/stadium	Score	Win	Loss	Save	TV	Attendance	Overall record	A10 record
February 17	at Duke*		Durham Bulls Athletic Park; Durham, NC	**L** 0–16	Santucci (1–0)	**Picone** (0–1)	None	ACCNX	364	0–1	—
February 18	at Duke*		Durham Bulls Athletic Park	**L** 1–2	Higgins (1–0)	**Stetzar** (0–1)	Tallon (1)	ACCNX	638	0–2	—
February 19	at Duke*		Durham Bulls Athletic Park	**W** 5–4^{10}	**Gabrysh** (1–0)	Beilenson (0–1)	**Stetzar** (1)	ACCNX	717	1–2	—

March (8–10)
Date	Opponent	Rank	Site/stadium	Score	Win	Loss	Save	TV	Attendance	Overall record	A10 record
March 1	at Rutgers*		Bainton Field; Piscataway, NJ	**L** 3–6	Parliament (1–0)	**Gabrysh** (1–1)	Gorski (1)	BTN+	322	1–3	—
March 3	at Old Dominion*		Bud Metheny Baseball Complex; Norfolk, VA	**L** 4–15	Morgan (2–0)	**Picone** (0–2)	None	ESPN+	779	1–4	—
March 4	at Old Dominion*		Bud Metheny Baseball Complex	**L** 0–11	Armstrong (2–0)	**McCausland** (0–1)	None	ESPN+	779	1–5	—
March 5	at Old Dominion*		Bud Metheny Baseball Complex	**L** 11–13	Cook (2–0)	**Owsik** (0–1)	Bashara (1)	ESPN+	362	1–6	—
March 10	UMass Lowell*		Smithson Field; Merion, PA	**W** 4–3	**McCausland** (1–1)	Keevan (0–4)	**Gallo** (1)	ESPN+	110	2–6	—
March 11	UMass Lowell*		Smithson Field	**W** 7–1	**McShane** (1–0)	Draper (1–2)	None	ESPN+	212	3–6	—
March 12	UMass Lowell*		Smithson Field	**W** 9–3	**Falco** (1–0)	DiRito (1–1)	None	ESPN+	220	4–6	—
Ting Stadium Series
March 14	vs. Notre Dame*		Ting Stadium; Holly Springs, NC	**L** 3–6	Hely (1–1)	**Ciccone** (0–1)	Bosch (2)	ESPN+	163	4–7	—
March 15	vs. Notre Dame*		Ting Stadium	**L** 9–10	Cooper (1–0)	**Rodriguez** (0–1)	None	ESPN+	147	4–8	—
March 17	Iona*		Smithson Field	**W** 15–5	**Gallo** (1–0)	Torrado (0–3)	**Ciccone** (1)	ESPN+	171	5–8	—
March 18	Iona*		Smithson Field	**W** 16–6^{8}	**McShane** (2–0)	Chiaia (0–3)	None	ESPN+	318	6–8	—
March 19	Iona*		Smithson Field	**W** 13–0^{7}	**Picone** (1–2)	Untracht (0–3)	None	ESPN+	308	7–8	—
March 21	Monmouth*		Smithson Field	**L** 8–9	Horvath (1–0)	**Stetzar** (0–2)	Kent (1)	ESPN+	221	7–9	—
March 24	Maine*		Smithson Field	**W** 3–2	**Stetzar** (1–2)	Baeyens (0–1)	None	ESPN+	180	8–9	—
March 25	Maine*		Smithson Field	**L** 12–17	Scott (1–2)	**Ciccone** (0–2)	None	ESPN+	155	8–10	—
March 26	Maine*		Smithson Field	**L** 13–15	Lewis (2–1)	**Picone** (1–3)	None	ESPN+	325	8–11	—
Liberty Bell Classic
March 28	at Delaware*		Bob Hannah Stadium; Newark, DE	**L** 3–9	Grome (2–0)	**Owsik** (0–2)	Margolis (1)	FloSports	4,228	8–12	—
March 31	at Richmond		Malcolm U. Pitt Field; Richmond, VA	**W** 19–13	**McCausland** (2–1)	Argomaniz (2–3)	None	ESPN+	313	9–12	1–0

April (10–7–1)
Date	Opponent	Rank	Site/stadium	Score	Win	Loss	Save	TV	Attendance	Overall record	A10 record
April 1	at Richmond		Malcolm U. Pitt Field	**W** 15–0	**DeSanto** (1–0)	Weirather (2–2)	None	ESPN+	303	10–12	2–0
April 2	at Richmond		Malcolm U. Pitt Field	**L** 2–7	Subers (2–0)	**Picone** (1–4)	None	ESPN+	413	10–13	2–1
Liberty Bell Classic
April 5	Penn*		Smithson Field	**L** 6–18	Cerwinski (2–0)	**Picollo** (0–1)	None	ESPN+	182	10–14	—
April 7	VCU		Smithson Field	**W** 5–3	**McCausland** (3–1)	Gordon (2–2)	**McShane** (1)	ESPN+	274	11–14	3–1
April 8	VCU		Smithson Field	**W** 12–3	**Stetzar** (2–2)	Peters (1–3)	None	ESPN+	308	12–14	4–1
April 9	VCU		Smithson Field	**L** 7–11	Ellis (4–2)	**Shearer** (0–1)	None	ESPN+	302	12–15	4–2
April 11	at Delaware*		Bob Hannah Stadium	**L** 10–13	Margolis (3–0)	Ciccone (0–3)	None	FloSports	165	12–16	—
April 14	at Saint Louis		Billiken Sports Center; St. Louis, MO	**L** 2–4	Litman (4–1)	**McCausland** (3–2)	Bell (1)	ESPN+	180	12–17	4–3
April 15	at Saint Louis		Billiken Sports Center	**L** 6–10	Chaffin (4–1)	**DeSanto** (1–1)	Weber (1)	ESPN+	201	12–18	4–4
April 16	at Saint Louis		Billiken Sports Center	**L** 8–14	Holmes (2–0)	**Picone** (1–5)	None	ESPN+	121	12–19	4–5
April 21	UMass		Smithson Field	**W** 5–3	**McCausland** (4–2)	Belliveau (0–1)	**Stetzar** (2)	ESPN+	201	13–19	5–5
April 22	UMass		Smithson Field	**W** 12–3	**Owsik** (1–2)	Perrett (1–5)	None	ESPN+	400	14–19	6–5
April 23	UMass		Smithson Field	**W** 7–3	**Picone** (2–5)	Steele (0–3)	**McShane** (2)	ESPN+	323	15–19	7–5
April 25	Delaware*		Smithson Field	**W** 5–2	**Gallo** (2–0)	Grome (2–2)	**Stetzar** (3)	ESPN+	152	16–19	—
April 26	Bucknell*		Smithson Field	**T** 7–7^{7}	None	None	None	ESPN+	126	16–19–1	—
April 28	Fordham		Smithson Field	**W** 2–1	**McShane** (3–0)	Hughes (1–3)	**Stetzar** (4)	ESPN+	122	17–19–1	8–5
April 29	Fordham		Smithson Field	**W** 23–10	**Falco** (2–0)	Sachen (0–3)	None	ESPN+	129	18–19–1	9–5
April 30	Fordham		Smithson Field	**W** 7–1	**Picone** (3–5)	Egan (0–1)	None	ESPN+	153	19–19–1	10–5

May (8–3)
Date	Opponent	Rank	Site/stadium	Score	Win	Loss	Save	TV	Attendance	Overall record	A10 record
May 3	Villanova*		Smithson Field	**W** 13–6	**Gallo** (3–0)	Povey (0–1)	None	ESPN+	220	20–19–1	—
May 5	at Dayton		Woerner Field; Dayton, OH	**L** 9–16	Zapka (2–0)	**Falco** (2–1)	None	ESPN+	163	20–20–1	10–6
May 6	at Dayton		Woerner Field	**W** 7–5	**DeSanto** (2–1)	Majick (3–4)	**Stetzar** (5)	ESPN+	163	21–20–1	11–6
May 7	at Dayton		Woerner Field	**W** 15–2	**Picone** (4–5)	Steinhauer (1–5)	None	ESPN+	138	22–20–1	12–6
May 12	Rhode Island		Smithson Field	**W** 15–3	**McCausland** (5–2)	Sposato (3–6)	None	ESPN+	374	23–20–1	13–6
May 13	Rhode Island		Smithson Field	**W** 12–6	**DeSanto** (3–1)	Levesque (5–4)	None	ESPN+	413	24–20–1	14–6
May 14	Rhode Island		Smithson Field	**W** 6–5	**Gabrysh** (2–1)	Hsu (0–1)	None	ESPN+	425	25–20–1	15–6
May 16	at Villanova*		Villanova Ballpark; Plymouth Meeting, PA	**L** 4–8	Udell (1–6)	**Rodriguez** (0–2)	None	SECN+	197	25–21–1	—
May 18	at George Mason		Spuhler Field; Fairfax, VA	**W** 9–4	**Falco** (3–1)	Stewart (1–2)	None	ESPN+	65	26–21–1	16–6
May 19	at George Mason		Spuhler Field	**L** 3–4	Mracna (3–1)	**Stetzar** (2–3)	None	ESPN+	143	26–22–1	16–7
May 20	at George Mason		Spuhler Field	**W** 13–6	**Picone** (5–5)	Grant (0–1)	None	ESPN+	266	27–22–1	17–7

Post-Season (0–0)

Patriot League tournament (0–0)
Date	Time (ET)	TV	Opponent	Rank	Stadium	Score	Win	Loss	Save	Attendance	Overall	A10T Record	Sources
Winner's bracket
May 24	11:00 a.m.	ESPN+	vs. (4) Saint Louis or (5) Richmond	(1)	The Diamond; Richmond, VA								

NCAA TBD Regional (0–0)
Date	Time (ET)	TV	Opponent	Rank	Stadium	Score	Win	Loss	Save	Attendance	Overall	A10T Record	Sources
Winner's bracket
May 24	11:00 a.m.	ESPN+	vs. (4) Saint Louis or (5) Richmond	(1)	The Diamond; Richmond, VA								

*Denotes non–conference game • Schedule source • Rankings based on the teams' current ranking in the D1Baseball poll
**W** Saint Joseph's win • **L** Saint Joseph's loss • **T** Saint Joseph's tie • Postponement or cancellation • **Bold** denotes Saint Joseph's player

== Postseason ==
=== Patriot League tournament ===
Patriot League Tournament Teams
(1) Army Black Knights	(2) Bucknell Bison	(3) Navy Midshipmen	(4) Lafayette Leopards

Semifinals					Finals
1	Army	5	15	5
4	Lafayette	7	6	1	1	Army	20	21	—
2	Bucknell	2	7	—	2	Bucknell	5	6	—
3	Navy	0	6	—

=== NCAA tournament ===
Tournament field to be announced.

== Rankings ==
Ranking movements Legend: — = Not ranked
	Week																			
Poll	Pre	1	2	3	4	5	6	7	8	9	10	11	12	13	14	15	16	17	18	Final
Coaches'	—	—*	—	—	—	—	—	—	—	—	—	—	—	—	—					
Baseball America	—	—	—	—	—	—	—	—	—	—	—	—	—	—	—					
Collegiate Baseball^	—	—	—	—	—	—	—	—	—	—	—	—	—	—	—					
NCBWA†	—	—	—	—	—	—	—	—	—	—	—	—	—	—	—					
D1Baseball	—	—	—	—	—	—	—	—	—	—	—	—	—	—	—					

^ Collegiate Baseball ranked 40 teams in their preseason poll, but only ranked 30 teams weekly during the season.
† NCBWA ranks 30 teams in their preseason poll, but only ranks 25 teams weekly during the season.
* A new poll was not released for this week, so for comparison purposes, the previous week's ranking is inserted in this week's slot.
