= 2023 Patriot League baseball tournament =

- Teams: 4
- Format: Best of three series
- Finals site: Johnson Stadium at Doubleday Field; West Point, New York
- Champions: Army (12th title)
- Winning coach: Chris Tracz (1st title)
- MVP: Kevin Dubrule (Army)
- Television: ESPN+

2023 Patriot League baseball standings
	Conf.						Overall
Team	W		L		T	PCT	W		L		T	PCT
Army ‍†‍‡‍^{y}	21	–	4	–	0	.840	37	–	16	–	0	.698
Navy ‍‍‍	14	–	11	–	0	.560	23	–	27	–	0	.460
Bucknell ‍‍‍	14	–	11	–	0	.560	23	–	22	–	1	.511
Lafayette ‍‍‍	10	–	15	–	0	.400	15	–	37	–	0	.288
Lehigh ‍‍‍	10	–	15	–	0	.400	24	–	36	–	0	.400
Holy Cross ‍‍‍	6	–	19	–	0	.240	16	–	35	–	0	.314
† – Conference champion ‡ – Tournament champion y – Invited to the NCAA Tournament; As of May 21, 2023; Rankings from D1Baseball

The 2023 Patriot League baseball tournament took place on consecutive weekends, with the semifinals held on May 13–14 and the finals on May 21–22. The higher seeded teams hosted each best of three series. The winner, Army, earned the conference's automatic bid to the 2023 NCAA Division I baseball tournament.

== Seeding ==
The top four finishers from the regular season are seeded one through four, with the top seed hosting the fourth seed and second seed hosting the third. The higher seeded team was designated as the home team for each game of the series.

Team	W	L	Pct.	GB	Seed	Tiebreaker
Army	21	4	.840	—	1	—
Bucknell	14	11	.560	7	2	3–2 vs. Navy
Navy	14	11	.560	7	3	2–3 vs. Bucknell
Lafayette	10	15	.400	11	4	3–2 vs. Lehigh
Lehigh	10	15	.400	11	—	2–3 vs. Lafayette
Holy Cross	6	19	.240	15	—	—

== Bracket ==
Semifinals
1	Army	5	15	5
4	Lafayette	7	6	1
2	Bucknell	2	7	–
3	Navy	0	6	–

Championship
1	Army	20	21	–
2	Bucknell	5	6	–

== Results ==
=== Semifinal Series ===
==== #4 Lafayette at #1 Army ====
May 13, 2023 1:00 PM at Johnson Stadium at Doubleday Field Game 1
Team	1	2	3	4	5	6	7	8	9	R	H	E
Lafayette	2	0	3	0	0	2	0	0	0	7	11	1
Army	0	2	0	0	0	1	0	2	0	5	8	0
WP: Alex Walsh (6–2) LP: Matthew Ronnebaum (6–4) Sv: Luke Craytor (1); Home runs: Lafayette: Michael Zarrillo, Seif Ingram, Ben Petrone; Army: Coleson Titus 2, Ethan Ellis; Boxscore

May 14, 2023 12:00 PM at Johnson Stadium at Doubleday Field Game 2
Team	1	2	3	4	5	6	7	8	9	R	H	E
Lafayette	0	2	1	0	0	0	1	1	1	6	9	2
Army	0	0	0	0	7	3	2	3	X	15	13	2
WP: Mike Ruggieri (8–1) LP: Adam Bogosian (2–6) Sv: Trevor Finan (1); Home runs: Lafayette: Pete Ciuffreda, Justin Grech, Ethan Swidler; Army: Derek Berg, Sam Ruta, Braden Golinski, Coleson Titus; Boxscore

May 14, 2023 3:50 PM at Johnson Stadium at Doubleday Field Game 3
Team	1	2	3	4	5	6	7	8	9	R	H	E
Lafayette	0	1	0	0	0	0	0	0	0	1	3	0
Army	0	1	2	0	1	0	1	0	X	5	7	0
WP: Robbie Buecker (5–3) LP: Joe Skapinetz (2–4); Home runs: Lafayette: Ethan Swidler; Army: None; Notes: Army wins series 2–1; Boxscore

==== #3 Navy at #2 Bucknell ====
May 13, 2023 12:00 PM at Eugene B. Depew Field Game 1
Team	1	2	3	4	5	6	7	8	9	R	H	E
Navy	0	0	0	0	0	0	0	0	0	0	3	0
Bucknell	1	0	0	0	0	1	0	0	0	2	9	0
WP: Chris DiFiore (6–5) LP: Nate Mitchell (6–5); Boxscore

May 13, 2023 3:00 PM at Eugene B. Depew Field Game 2
Team	1	2	3	4	5	6	7	8	9	R	H	E
Navy	0	0	0	3	0	1	0	2	0	6	10	0
Bucknell	2	0	1	1	0	0	0	1	2	7	11	0
WP: Nick Mulvey (3–0) LP: Landon Kruer (0–1); Home runs: Navy: Kyle Rausch; Bucknell: None; Notes: Winning run scored with 2 outs; Bucknell wins series 2–0; Boxscore

=== Championship Series ===
May 21, 2023 1:00 PM at Johnson Stadium at Doubleday Field Game 1
Team	1	2	3	4	5	6	7	8	9	R	H	E
Bucknell	1	0	2	0	2	0	0	0	0	5	10	4
Army	0	1	10	0	0	0	8	1	X	20	19	0
WP: Matthew Ronnebaum (7–4) LP: Chris DiFiore (6–6); Home runs: Bucknell: Jacob Corson, Sean Keys; Army: Sam Ruta, Ross Friedrick, Braden Golinski; Notes: Postponed from May 20 due to inclement weather Boxscore

May 22, 2023 1:00 PM at Johnson Stadium at Doubleday Field Game 2
Team	1	2	3	4	5	6	7	8	9	R	H	E
Bucknell	2	2	0	1	0	0	1	0	0	6	9	0
Army	0	4	7	5	0	1	0	4	X	21	17	2
WP: Mike Ruggieri (9–1) LP: Tyler O'Neill (3–5); Home runs: Bucknell: None; Army: Derek Berg, Kevin Dubrule 2, Braden Golinski; Notes: Army wins Patriot League tournament Boxscore
