= Army Black Knights baseball =

- 2026 Army Black Knights baseball team
- Founded: 1890; 136 years ago
- University: United States Military Academy
- Head coach: Chris Tracz (4th season)
- Conference: Patriot League
- Location: West Point, New York
- Home stadium: Johnson Stadium at Doubleday Field (capacity: 880)
- Nickname: Black Knights
- Colors: Black, gold, and gray

NCAA tournament appearances
- 2000, 2004, 2005, 2009, 2012, 2013, 2018, 2019, 2021, 2022, 2023, 2024

Conference tournament champions
- 1997, 2000, 2004, 2005, 2009, 2012, 2013, 2018, 2019, 2021, 2022, 2023, 2024

Conference regular season champions
- EIBL: 1950, 1960, 1965, 1966; Patriot League: 1997, 2000, 2004, 2005, 2008, 2010, 2012, 2014, 2018, 2022, 2023, 2024, 2026

For information on all United States Military Academy sports, see Army Black Knights

The Army Black Knights baseball team is a varsity intercollegiate athletic team of the United States Military Academy in West Point, New York, United States. The team is a member of the Patriot League, which is part of the National Collegiate Athletic Association's Division I. Army's first baseball team was fielded in 1890. The team plays its home games at Johnson Stadium at Doubleday Field in West Point, New York. The Black Knights are coached by Chris Tracz.

== Army in the NCAA Tournament ==
The NCAA Division I baseball tournament started in 1947. Army has won the Patriot League baseball tournament thirteen times, starting in 1997. They competed in a play-in best-of-three series with Ivy League champion Harvard for the right to play in the NCAA Tournament but lost in three games. Army won the Patriot League again in 2000 and received an automatic bid to the tournament. The Black Knights have played in the tournament (a double-elimination format) twelve times, most recently in 2024.

Season	Region	Opponent	Result
2000	Montclair Regional	Rutgers; Penn State	L 3–4; L 1–3
2004	Baton Rouge Regional	LSU; College of Charleston	L 0–9; L 1–2
2005	Tallahassee Regional	Florida State; South Alabama; Auburn	L 2–3; W 8–5; L 3–12
2009	Austin Regional	Texas; Texas State; Boston College; Texas	L 1–3; W 7–4; W 4–3; L 10–14
2012	Charlottesville Regional	Virginia; Oklahoma	L 1–9; L 1–2 (10)
2013	Charlottesville Regional	Virginia; UNC Wilmington	L 1–2; L 5–9
2018	Raleigh Regional	NC State; Auburn; NC State	W 5–1; L 1–12; L 1–11
2019	Lubbock Regional	Texas Tech; Florida	L 2–11; L 5–13
2021	Lubbock Regional	Texas Tech; UCLA	L 3–6; L 6–13
2022	Hattiesburg Regional	Southern Miss; Kennesaw State	L 0–2; L 8–9
2023	Charlottesville Regional	Virginia; Oklahoma	L 1–15; L 1–10
2024	Athens Regional	Georgia; Georgia Tech	L 7–8; L 2–4
TOTALS	12 Tournaments	4–22	.154

== Major League Baseball ==
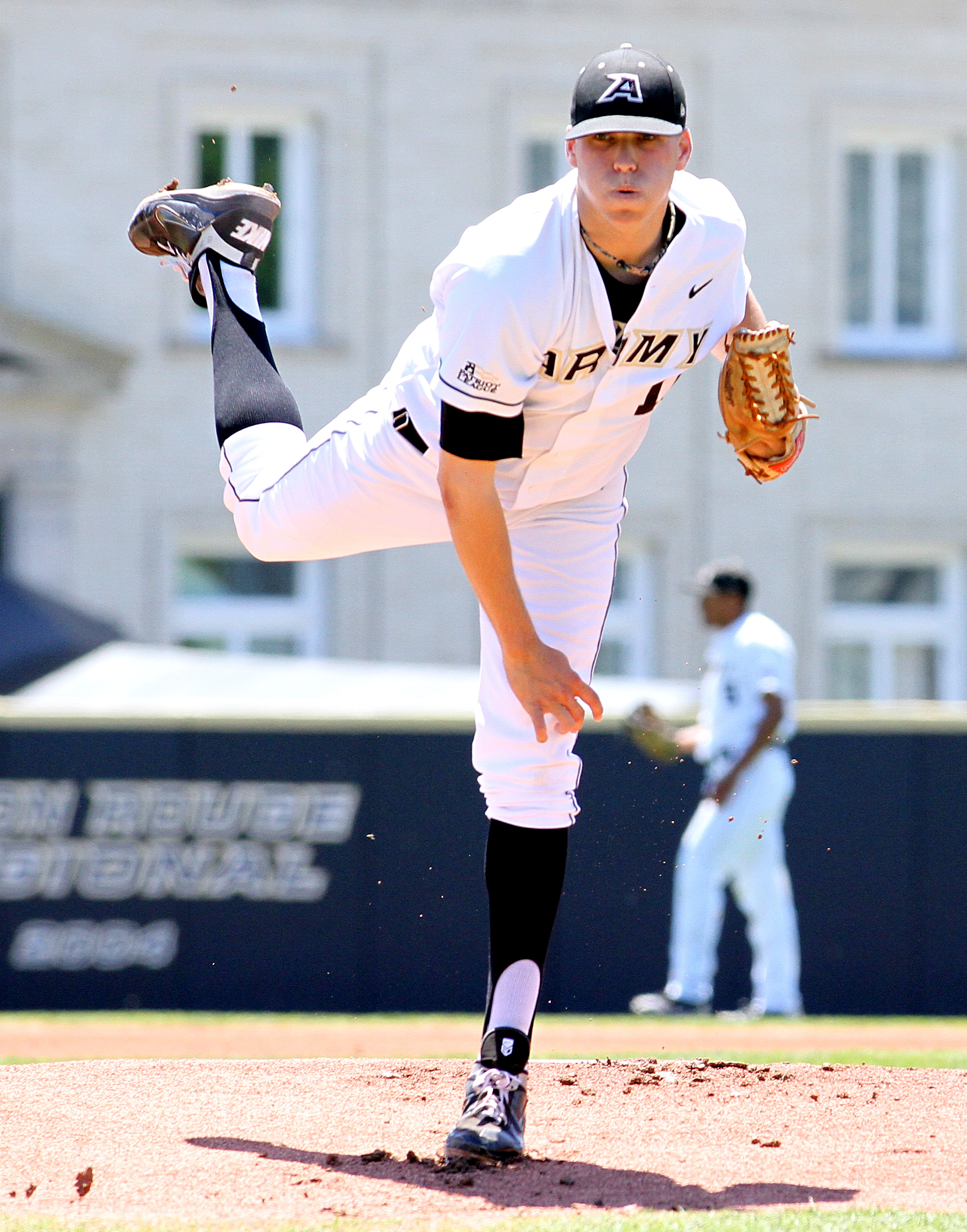
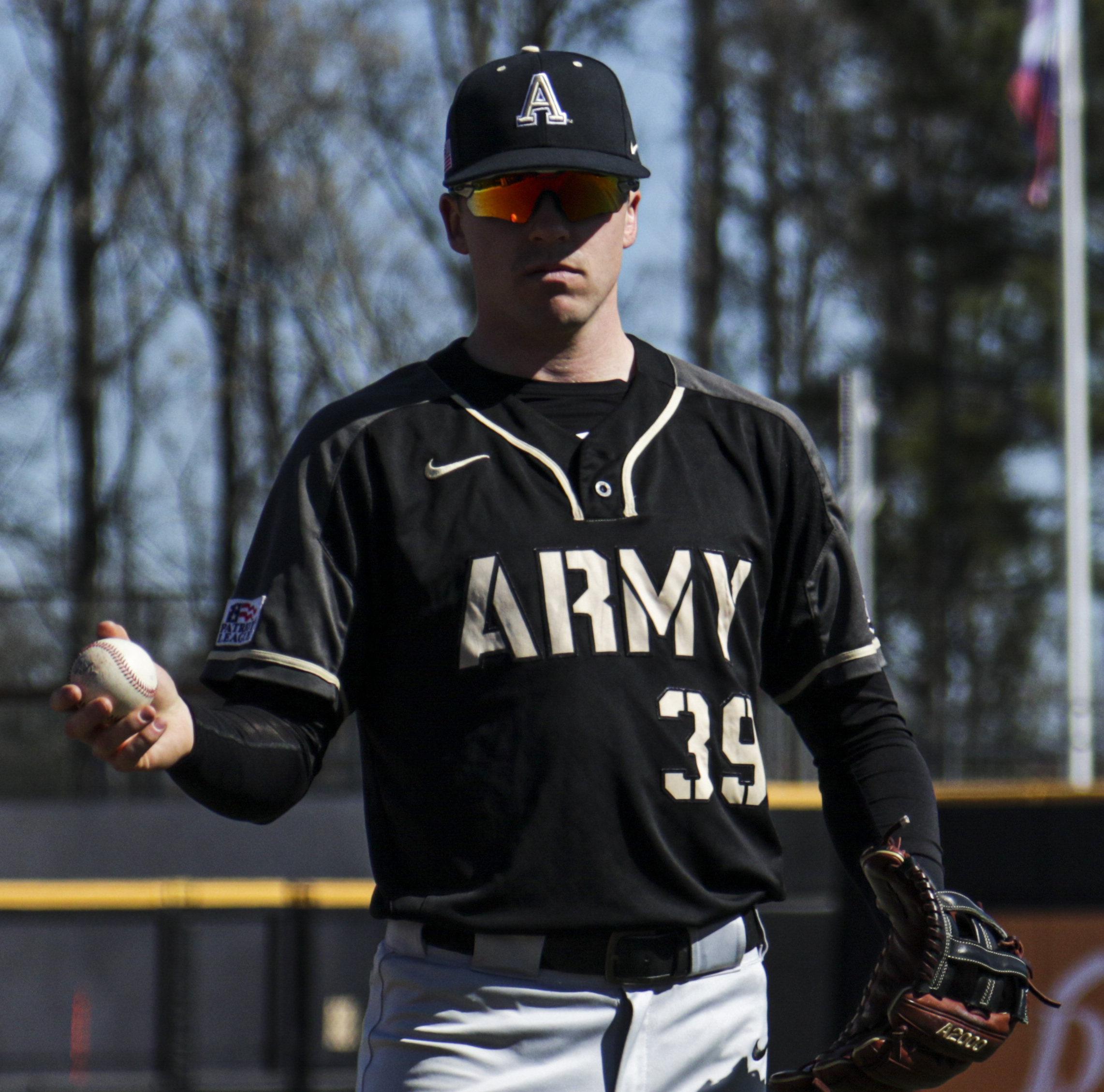
Chris Rowley (left) in 2012 and Jacob Hurtubise (right) in 2020

Army has had 20 Major League Baseball draft selections since the draft began in 1965.

Black Knights in the Major League Baseball Draft
Year	Player	Round	Team
1971	Lee Daney	41	Cardinals
1971	David Carey	4	Expos
1979	Craig Jones	3	Mets
1980	Craig Jones	4	Braves
1998	Mike Scioletti	43	White Sox
2005	Schuyler Williamson	26	Tigers
2006	Nick Hill	47	Red Sox
2007	Milan Dinga	10	Angels
2007	Nick Hill	7	Mariners
2008	Cole White	42	Pirates
2008	Chris Simmons	41	Pirates
2008	Drew Clothier	37	Marlins
2010	Matt Fouch	34	Braves
2011	Kevin McKague	50	Braves
2011	Clint Moore	31	Padres
2012	Kevin McKague	23	Braves
2012	J.T. Watkins	10	Red Sox
2014	Nick Dignacco	40	Rangers
2015	Alex Robinett	32	Yankees
2019	Jacob Hurtubise	39	Mariners

On August 12, 2017, Chris Rowley (2010–13) became the first West Point graduate to play in the Major Leagues, pitching 5.2 innings and allowing 1 run against the Pittsburgh Pirates, earning the win.

=== Games versus professional baseball teams ===
Date	Opponent	Result	Score
May 10, 1914	New York Giants	L	7-2
April 15, 1922	New York Giants	L	11-3
April 16, 1923	New York Giants	L	14-2
April 23, 1924	New York Giants	L	10-3
April 13, 1925	New York Giants	L	7-0
April 11, 1927	New York Giants	L	19-6
May 26, 1927	New York Yankees	L	2-0
April 9, 1928	New York Giants	L	16-4
May 3, 1928	New York Yankees	L	20-9
April 15, 1929	New York Giants	L	6-1
April 14, 1930	New York Giants	L	18-0
May 23, 1930	New York Yankees	L	20-2
April 13, 1931	New York Giants	L	4-3
April 17, 1931	New York Yankees	L	15-1
May 31, 1932	New York Yankees	L	9-3
April 10, 1933	New York Yankees	L	9-0
June 11, 1934	New York Yankees	L	7-0
April 15, 1935	New York Giants	L	9-0
April 22, 1935	New York Yankees	L	5-1
June 1, 1936	New York Yankees	L	6-2
April 19, 1937	New York Yankees	L	19-4
April 17, 1939	New York Giants	L	4-2
April 15, 1940	New York Giants	L	7-1
April 14, 1941	New York Giants	L	9-0
April 13, 1942	New York Giants	L	12-3
April 2, 1943	Brooklyn Dodgers	L	12-8
April 5, 1943	Montreal Royals	L	6-3
March 31, 1944	Brooklyn Dodgers	L	18-4
April 1, 1944	Montreal Royals	W	8-6
April 10, 1944	Montreal Royals	T	6-6
April 17, 1944	New York Giants	L	11-9
May 8, 1944	New York Yankees	L	14-0
March 24, 1945	Brooklyn Dodgers	L	9-5
March 28, 1945	Brooklyn Dodgers	W	5-4
April 7, 1945	Brooklyn Dodgers	W	4-0
April 9, 1945	Montreal Royals	W	12-8
April 11, 1945	Montreal Royals	L	8-4
April 12, 1945	Montreal Royals	L	9-3
April 15, 1946	New York Giants	T	2-2
April 19, 1946	Brooklyn Dodgers	L	7-3
April 28, 1947	Brooklyn Dodgers	L	16-5
April 19, 1948	New York Giants	L	7-2
April 2, 1949	Brooklyn Dodgers	L	4-3
April 17, 1950	New York Giants	L	8-0
April 12, 1954	New York Giants	L	6-5
April 11, 1955	New York Giants	L	14-1
April 15, 1957	New York Giants	L	16-0
May 26, 1958	San Francisco Giants	L	17-1
April 14, 1961	New York Yankees	L	14-0
May 7, 1962	New York Yankees	L	8-4
April 22, 1963	New York Yankees	L	15-2
May 6, 1963	New York Mets	L	3-0
April 27, 1964	New York Yankees	L	8-2
May 10, 1965	New York Mets	L	8-0
April 29, 1966	New York Yankees	L	1-0
May 8, 1967	New York Mets	L	4-0
May 9, 1968	New York Yankees	L	9-0
May 22, 1969	New York Yankees	L	4-0
April 15, 1971	New York Mets	L	8-0
April 27, 1972	New York Yankees	L	10-1
April 30, 1973	New York Mets	L	7-1
April 23, 1974	New York Yankees	L	7-0
May 5, 1975	New York Mets	L	5-0
April 19, 1976	New York Yankees	L	2-0
April 19, 1979	New York Mets	L	19-0
April 11, 1983	Detroit Tigers	L	11-1
April 26, 1984	New York Mets	L	6-0
May 6, 1986	Houston Astros	L	9-0
March 30, 2013	New York Yankees	L	10-5
March 31, 2017	New York Mets	PPD	0-0

==== Records ====
Opponent	Wins	Loses	Ties	Cancelled
N.Y./S.F. Giants	0	23	0	0
New York Yankees	0	22	0	0
New York Mets	0	8	0	1
Brooklyn Dodgers	2	6	0	0
Montreal Royals	2	3	1	0
Detroit Tigers	0	1	0	0
Houston Astros	0	1	0	0

== See also ==
- List of NCAA Division I baseball programs
