= Dan Briody =

American political writer

Dan Briody is the author of the books The Halliburton Agenda: The Politics of Oil and Money (2004) and The Iron Triangle: Inside the Secret World of the Carlyle Group (2003). Born in Ridgefield, Connecticut, he and his family now live in Bridgewater.

== Career ==
Prior to writing about corporations and their political ties, Briody was a technology journalist, including working as an editor and columnist for InfoWorld. He later began writing for the magazine Red Herring, for whom he initially wrote about the Carlyle Group in 2001.

Briody expanded his Red Herring Carlyle Group article, turning it into his first book in 2003. The Iron Triangle landed on several best-seller lists, with The New York Times describing it as "one-stop shopping for anyone who wants a laundry list of accusations against Carlyle since its inception in 1987."

The Iron Triangle put Briody in the media spotlight, commenting to audiences curious about the confluence of the military business and politics. Briody appeared in Michael Moore's movie Fahrenheit 9/11, talking about how the Carlyle Group benefited from 9/11 and the Bush family's connections with the Carlyle Group and Saudi Arabia. Briody has since appeared on a number of national broadcasts including The Today Show, Nightline, The NewsHour with Jim Lehrer, Countdown with Keith Olbermann, and NPR's Fresh Air.

In 2004, Briody published The Halliburton Agenda, a detailed account of Halliburton, the oil services and logistics company formerly run by Dick Cheney. In particular, he covered its subsidiary KBR (formerly named Kellogg Brown & Root).

More recently, Briody writes freelance articles for a variety of magazines, including Martha Stewart Living, Golf Digest, BusinessWeek, MSN, and Inc. He is also the founder of a communications consultancy for Fortune 500 companies.

== Books ==
- Briody, Dan (2004). The Halliburton Agenda: The Politics of Oil and Money. John Wiley & Sons. ISBN 978-0-471-63860-5.
- —— (2003). The Iron Triangle: Inside the Secret World of the Carlyle Group. John Wiley & Sons. ISBN 978-0-471-28108-5.
