= Jacob Hurtubise =

American baseball player (born 1997)

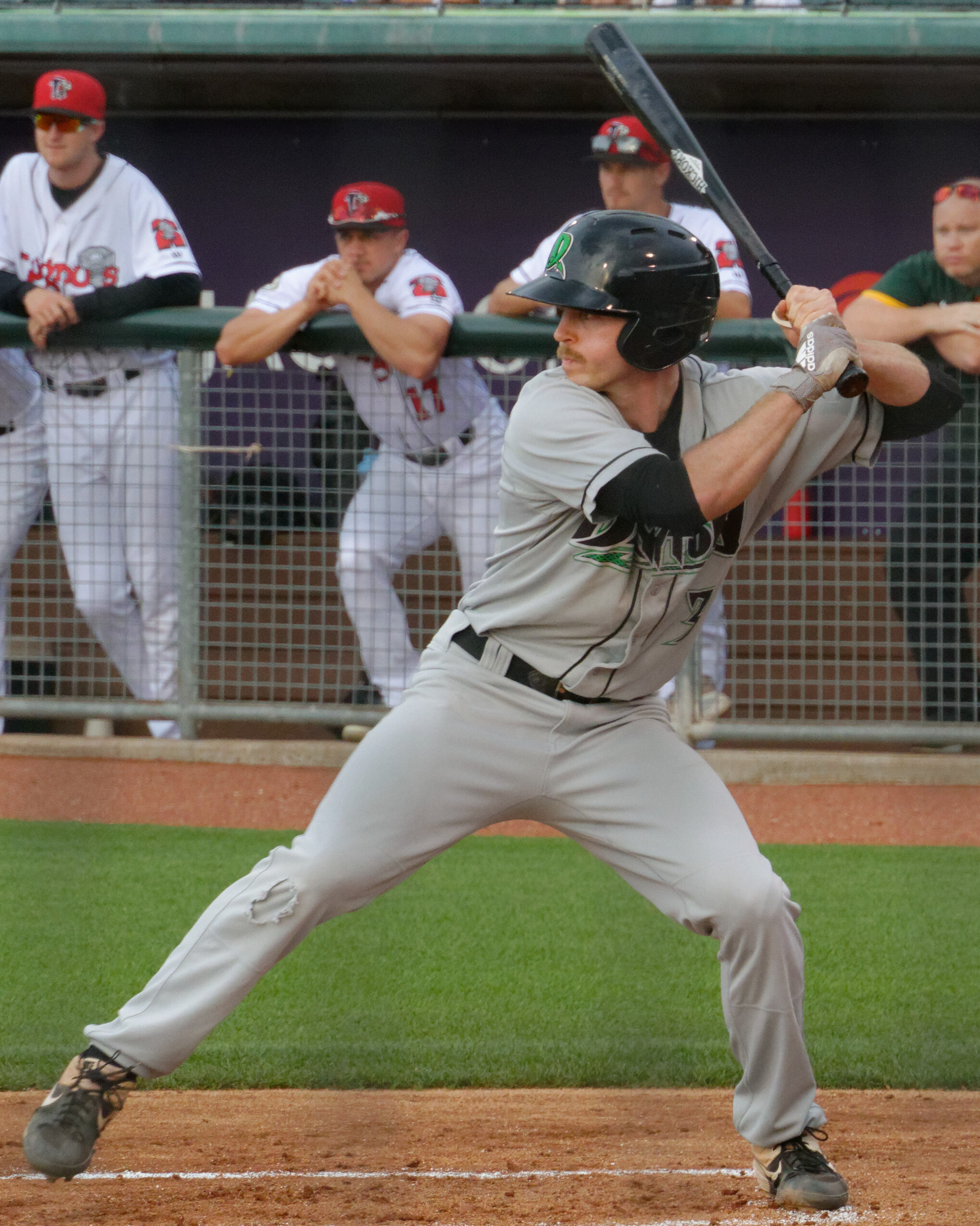
- Hurtubise with the Dayton Dragons in 2021

Free agent
- Outfielder
- Born: December 11, 1997 (age 28); Indianapolis, Indiana, U.S.
- Bats: Left Throws: Right

MLB debut
- May 13, 2024, for the Cincinnati Reds

MLB statistics (through 2025 season)
- Batting average: .167
- Home runs: 0
- Runs batted in: 4
- Stats at Baseball Reference

Teams
- Cincinnati Reds (2024–2025)

Jacob Gilles Hurtubise (born December 11, 1997) is an American professional baseball outfielder who is a free agent. He has previously played in Major League Baseball (MLB) for the Cincinnati Reds.

== Amateur career ==
Hurtubise attended Zionsville Community High School in Zionsville, Indiana, and the United States Military Academy, where he played college baseball for the Army Black Knights. Despite playing only three full seasons at Army due to the COVID-19 pandemic, he set Patriot League career records in stolen bases and walks. He was twice named to the All-Patriot League First Team and in 2019 was named the Patriot League Defensive Player of the Year. In 2019, he played collegiate summer baseball with the Harwich Mariners and the Orleans Firebirds of the Cape Cod Baseball League. He was drafted by the Seattle Mariners in the 39th round of the 2019 MLB draft, but did not sign.

== Professional career ==
=== Cincinnati Reds ===
On July 17, 2020, Hurtubise signed with the Cincinnati Reds as an undrafted free agent. He, along with Cole Christiansen, Elijah Riley, Connor Slomka and Zac McGraw, was among the first athletes to be granted a delay in his military service to pursue a professional sports career under a new policy. Hurtubise did not play in any games for the organization in 2020 due to the cancellation of the minor league season because of the COVID-19 pandemic.

Hurtubise made his professional debut in 2021 with the High–A Dayton Dragons, batting .283/.413/.337 with no home runs, 33 RBI, and 39 stolen bases across 102 games. In 2022, he played in 63 games for the Double–A Chattanooga Lookouts, hitting .250/.385/.308 with one home run, nine RBI, and 16 stolen bases.

Hurtubise split the 2023 campaign between the Double–A Chattanooga and the Triple–A Louisville Bats. In 119 games split between the two affiliated, he hit a cumulative .330/.479/.483 with seven home runs, 46 RBI, and 45 stolen bases. Hurtubise was named the Reds' minor league position player of the year following the season.

On November 14, 2023, the Reds added Hurtubise to their 40-man roster to protect him from the Rule 5 draft. He was optioned to the Triple–A Louisville Bats to begin the 2024 season. On May 13, 2024, Hurtubise was promoted to the major leagues for the first time. He made his debut that night as an eighth-inning pinch runner for Mike Ford against the Arizona Diamondbacks at Chase Field in Arizona. He became the second USMA graduate to play in MLB. In 29 appearances for Cincinnati during his rookie campaign, Hurtubise batted .185/.297/.241 with four RBI and two stolen bases.

Hurtubise played in 12 games for the Reds, going 1-for-12 (.083) with one walk. Hurtubise was designated for assignment following the acquisition of Ryan Vilade on June 14, 2025.

=== Seattle Mariners ===
On June 17, 2025, Hurtubise was claimed off waivers by the Seattle Mariners. On July 9, Hurtubise was removed from the 40-man roster and sent outright to the Triple-A Tacoma Rainiers. In 12 appearances for Tacoma, he went 4-for-24 (.167) with three RBI and three stolen bases. Hurtubise was released by the Mariners organization on July 22.

=== Houston Astros ===
On July 24, 2025, Hurtubise signed a minor league contract with the Houston Astros. In 10 appearances for the Triple-A Sugar Land Space Cowboys, he batted .207/.395/.276 with two RBI and three stolen bases. Hurtubise was released by the Astros organization on September 7.

=== Milwaukee Brewers ===
On February 3, 2026, Hurtubise signed a minor league contract with the Milwaukee Brewers. In 88 games between Triple-A and Double-A he batted .258/.385/.319 with no home runs, 28 RBIs and 21 stolen bases. He elected free agency on November 2.
