= Nicholas Hill (Virginia Burgess) =

American politician (c. 1603–1675)

Lieutenant Colonel Nicholas Hill (c. 1603 – October 1675) was a politician and planter in the English colony of Virginia. He served in the House of Burgesses 1659–1666, representing Isle of Wight County.

Hill was born in England around 1603. By 1635, he was living in Elizabeth City County, Virginia. In 1653 he married Silvestra Bennett, daughter of the Puritan Edward Bennett. He served as a major in the Isle of Wight county militia and was elected to represent the county from 1659 to 1666. He was later promoted to lieutenant colonel. On April 19, 1675 he made out his will and died before October 20, 1675 when his will was probated at the county court.
