= Nicholas Hill (printer) =

English printer

Nicholas Hill (died 1557) was an English printer. He was also known as Montanus or Van de Berghe.

He was a native of the Low Countries who came to England in 1519.

In 1544 the earliest book attributed to him as a printer was issued (De termino Michaelis anno regni Regis Henrici sexti primo.), and between this date and 1553 he printed twenty-three books, mostly for other people. He appears to have done no retail trade as a bookseller, which may account for his house having no sign or at least none ever mentioned.
