= Stephen C. Reich =

American baseball player (1971–2005)

Stephen Reich
- Reich as a cadet at West Point
- Born: Stephen Charles Reich; May 22, 1971; Solon, Ohio, U.S.
- Died: June 28, 2005 (aged 34); Kunar Province, Afghanistan
- Military career
- Allegiance: United States
- Branch: United States Army
- Service years: 1993–2005
- Rank: Major
- Unit: 160th Special Operations Aviation Regiment
- Conflicts: Operation Allied Force; War in Afghanistan: Operation Red Wings †
- Awards: Bronze Star; Purple Heart

Major Stephen C. Reich (May 22, 1971 – June 28, 2005) was an American soldier and Minor League Baseball player who was killed in action while on a rescue mission in Afghanistan at age 34. Reich played for the "Team USA" baseball team in 1993, and has more wins than any other pitcher in the history of the United States Military Academy.

== Biography ==
Born in Solon, Ohio, and raised in Connecticut, Reich was the star pitcher at Shepaug Valley High School, a left-hander who led the varsity baseball team to a state championship in 1987 where he pitched and won the championship game. He led the team back to title contention in 1989. Coming out of high school, Reich was a highly touted pitching prospect, but he chose the military over professional baseball.

Reich attended the United States Military Academy where he pitched for the Army baseball team. Reich was a star pitcher for Army and holds the record for most wins by a West Point pitcher. "He was one of the best to ever come through here," said Bob Beretta, a spokesman for the Army baseball team. "When we say someone here is the best since, it's always the best since Steve Reich."

Reich was known for his fastball and command, rarely walking a batter. He signed with the Baltimore Orioles organization in 1996 after completing two years of a four-year military commitment, and pitched two games for their Class–A High Desert Mavericks affiliate in that year before being recalled by the Army.

Even after his initial military commitment ended, Reich was a highly touted pitcher, but he chose military service over professional baseball.

In 1993, Reich was named to the "Team USA" baseball team. He carried the American flag while representing Team USA in 1993 at the World University Games. He made 17 appearances for Team USA playing in Italy, Nicaragua and Cuba and at the World University Games.

In 1996, Reich was ordered to Germany. He served in Operation Allied Force in Hungary, Bosnia, Albania, and Kosovo.

Reich served four tours of duty in Afghanistan and was killed in action on June 28, 2005, during Operation Red Wings to rescue a four-man Navy SEAL team. Reich was one of 16 troops (eight Nightstalkers and eight Navy SEALs) aboard an Army Special Operations MH-47 Chinook helicopter that was struck by a rocket-propelled grenade in the mountains of eastern Afghanistan's Kunar province. This mission was described in the book, Lone Survivor by Marcus Luttrell. Reich was assigned to 3rd Battalion 160th Special Operations Aviation Regiment (Airborne) from Hunter Army Airfield, Georgia.

== Awards and decorations ==
During his military career, Reich was awarded the following:

Badge	Combat Action Badge		
Badge	Senior Army Aviator Wings		
1st Row	Bronze Star with 2 Oak leaf clusters		
2nd Row	Purple Heart	Meritorious Service Medal with 1 Oak leaf cluster	Air Medal with "V" device
3rd Row	Army Commendation Medal	Army Achievement Medal with 2 Oak leaf clusters	National Defense Service Medal with 1 Service star
4th Row	Armed Forces Expeditionary Medal	Afghanistan Campaign Medal with 1 Campaign star	Global War on Terrorism Expeditionary Medal
5th Row	Global War on Terrorism Service Medal	Korea Defense Service Medal	Armed Forces Service Medal
6th Row	Army Service Ribbon	Army Overseas Service Ribbon	NATO Medal for the former Yugoslavia with 1 Service star
Badges	Parachutist Badge		Air Assault Badge
Unit awards	Joint Meritorious Unit Award	Valorous Unit Award	Army Superior Unit Award with 1 Oak leaf cluster
Badge	160th Special Operations Aviation Regiment (Airborne); Distinctive unit insignia		

- 4 Overseas Service Bars.
