= Lanford Monroe =

American painter

Lanford Monroe (1950–2000) was an internationally known American realist painter and sculptor. She was best known for impressionistic oil paintings frequently featuring wildlife or equine subjects. She was the daughter of noted magazine illustrator C.E. Monroe, Jr. and portraitist Betty Monroe, and was also influenced by artist neighbors John Clymer and Bob Kuhn in her hometown of Bridgewater, Connecticut. Lanford grew up in Huntsville, Alabama and graduated from Huntsville High School in 1968.

Having completed her first commission at six years of age, Monroe spent most of her life with her work. She attended the Ringling School of Art in Sarasota, Florida, and thereafter traveled throughout the country in pursuit of new projects. As Monroe's career developed, she moved from watercolor as her primary medium to oils. Her awards include the Society of Animal Artists Award of Excellence, the American Academy of Equine Art Popular and Landscape Awards and the Grand Teton Natural History Association Award.

Monroe died in 2000 due to a heart attack at her home near Taos, New Mexico. Following her death, Monroe's husband published a biography, Homefields: The Art of Lanford Monroe. He also helped the National Museum of Wildlife Art establish an artist-in-residence program in her memory.
