= Nick Hill (baseball) =

American professional baseball pitcher

- Pitcher
- Born: January 30, 1985 (age 41); Knoxville, Tennessee, U.S.
- Bats: Left Throws: Left
- Stats at Baseball Reference

Nicholas Hill (born January 30, 1985 in Knoxville, Tennessee) is an American former professional baseball pitcher.

== Army career ==
Hill was a Second Lieutenant in the United States Army. As an Army reserve there was still a possibility that Hill could have been sent overseas to Iraq or Afghanistan while he was playing in the Mariners farm system. He was involved in an Army program that allowed athletes to apply for an early discharge after two years of active duty after they signed their contracts. His active duty requirement expired in the 2009 season.

== Amateur career ==
=== High school ===
Hill graduated from Sullivan East High School in June 2003 where he was a three-time letterwinner and was named region player of the year and all-state selection as a senior. Hill established Tennessee state record by pitching 56 consecutive shutout innings.

=== College ===
In May 2007 Hill graduated from the United States Military Academy where he was named Patriot League Pitcher of the Year three times and earned First-Team All-Patriot League accolades four times. Hill was named to second team All-America squads by the American Baseball Coaches' Association and Collegiate Baseball in 2005. He was named to the Brooks Wallace Award Watch List in 2006 and 2007. Hill was also on the '07 Roger Clemens Award Watch List and the '06 National Collegiate Baseball Writers Association Preseason All-America First Team. He was selected to '06 Louisville Slugger Preseason All-American Second Team and the United States national baseball team in the same year, becoming the first Army player since Steve Reich to play for Team USA. He was drafted by the Boston Red Sox in the 47th round of the 2006 Major League Baseball draft, but could not sign due to military obligations. During his time in college he played on the United States national baseball team.

== Professional career ==
=== Seattle Mariners ===
Hill was the Seattle Mariners' seventh round selection in the 2007 Major League Baseball draft; signed by Mariners scout Robert Mummau. In his professional debut with the Short-Season Everett AquaSox he went 1–3 with a 0.51 ERA with two saves in 18 games in 2007.

He began the 2008 season with the Class-A High Desert Mavericks where he went 2–1 with one save and a 4.30 ERA in 25 relief appearances and 0–6 with a 4.65 ERA in 10 starts. He tossed a season-high 6 2/3 innings on June 2, while striking out a season-high seven batters in five innings on May 7. Hill appeared in nine games with the Double-A West Tennessee Diamond Jaxx from June 23 to July 12.

In 2009 Hill spent the entire season with the Diamond Jaxx going 5–6 with a 3.10 ERA, 100 strikeouts, 95 2/3 innings pitched in 36 games, nine starts. He and other Mariners' prospects were sent to the Arizona Fall League at the end of the season.
