= Roxbury, Connecticut =

- Town
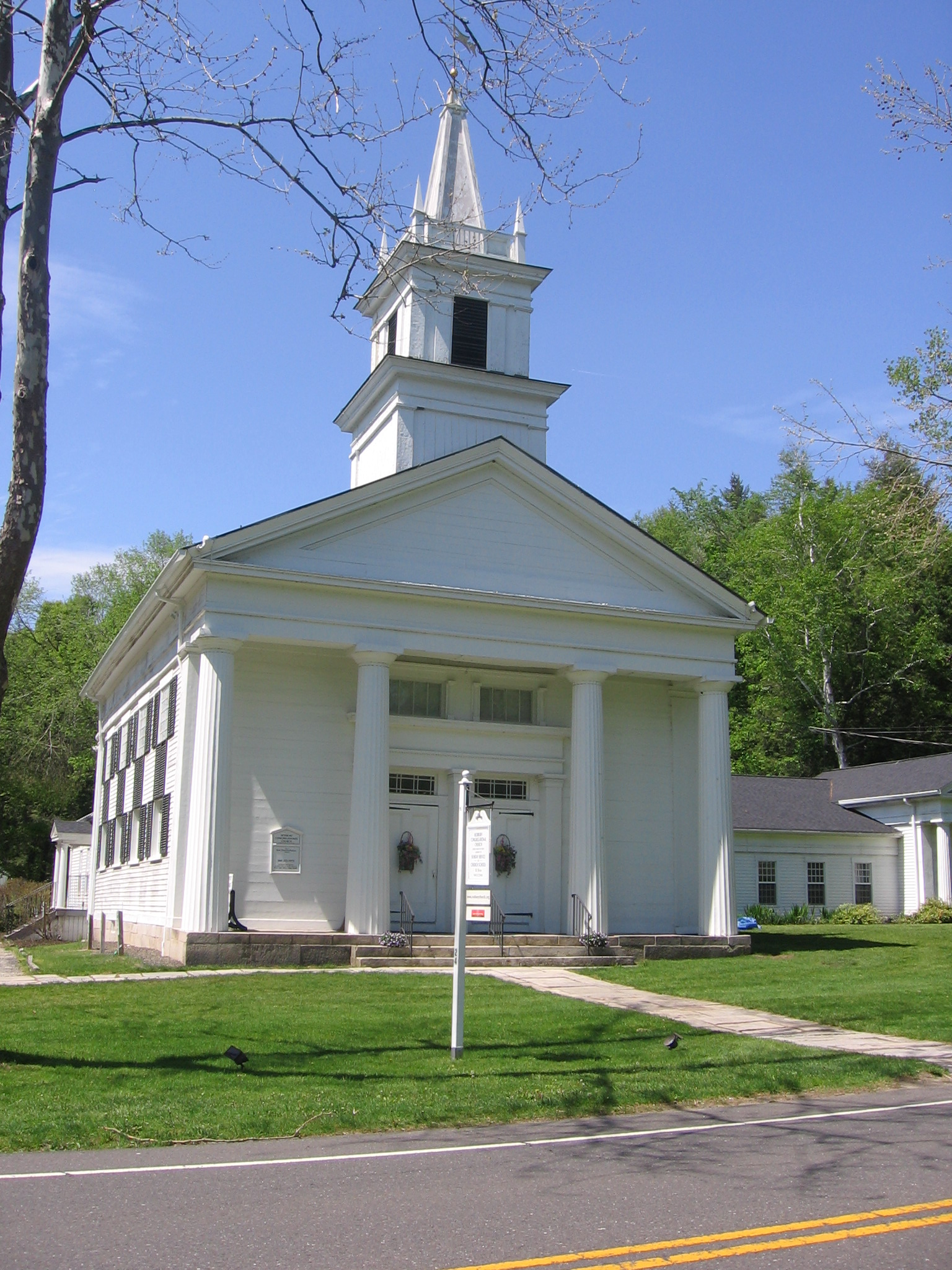
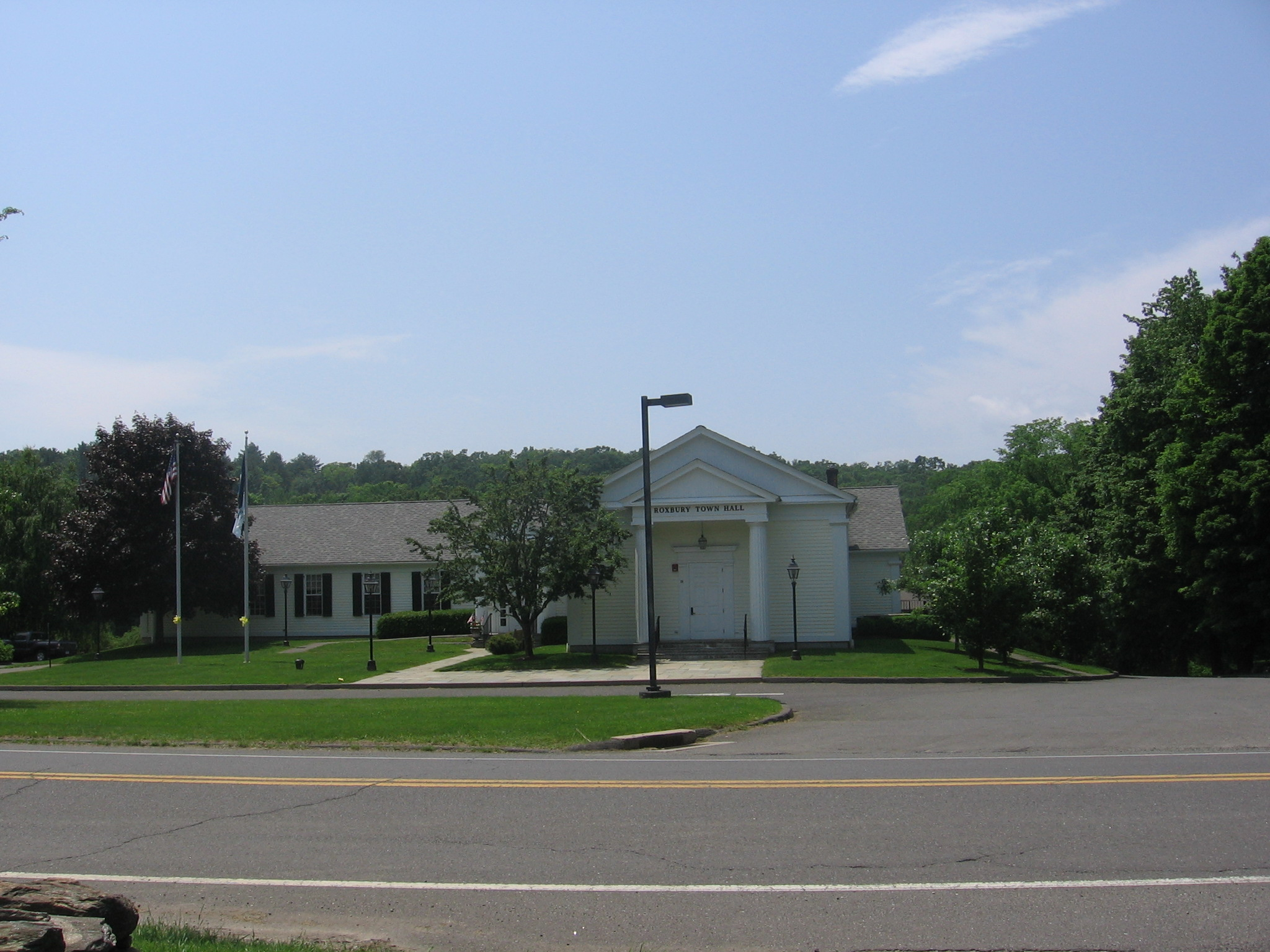
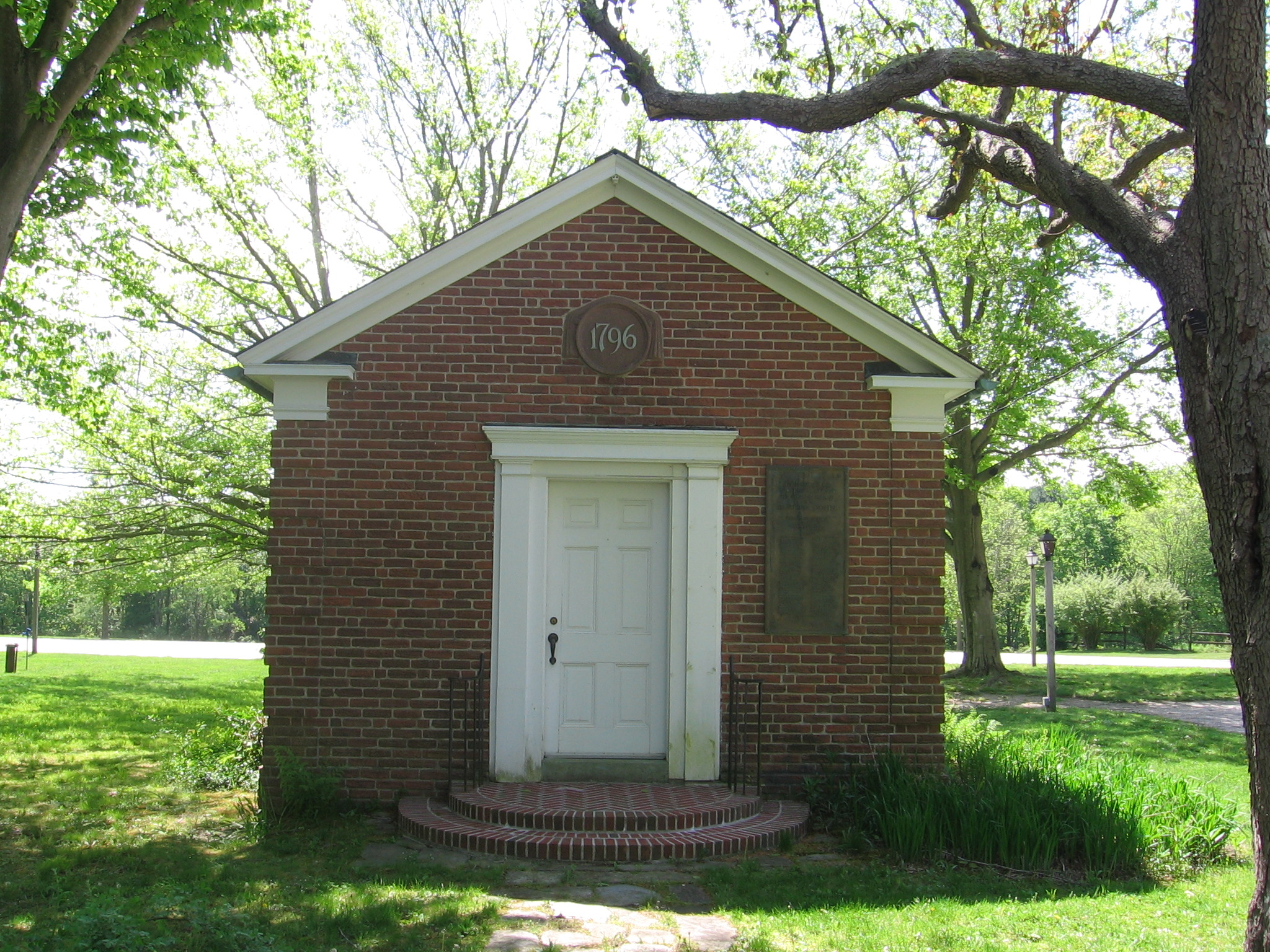
- Roxbury Congregational Church Town Hall Roxbury Museum

- Seal

- Coordinates: 41°33′07″N 73°18′09″W
- Country: United States
- U.S. state: Connecticut
- County: Litchfield
- Region: Northwest Hills
- Incorporated: 1796

Government
  - Type: Selectman-town meeting
  - First selectman: Patrick Roy (D)
  - Selectman: Russell Dirienzo (R)
  - Selectwoman: Kim Tester (D)

Area
  - Total: 26.4 sq mi (68.3 km^{2})
  - Land: 26.3 sq mi (68.1 km^{2})
  - Water: 0.039 sq mi (0.1 km^{2})
- Elevation: 541 ft (165 m)

Population (2020)
  - Total: 2,260
  - Density: 86.0/sq mi (33.2/km^{2})
- Time zone: UTC−5 (Eastern)
  - Summer (DST): UTC−4 (Eastern)
- ZIP code: 06783
- Area codes: 203/475, 860/959
- FIPS code: 09-65930
- GNIS feature ID: 0213498
- Website: www.roxburyct.com

Roxbury is a town in Litchfield County, Connecticut, United States. The population was 2,260 at the 2020 census. The town is located 65 miles (105 km) northeast of New York City, and is part of the Northwest Hills Planning Region.

== History ==
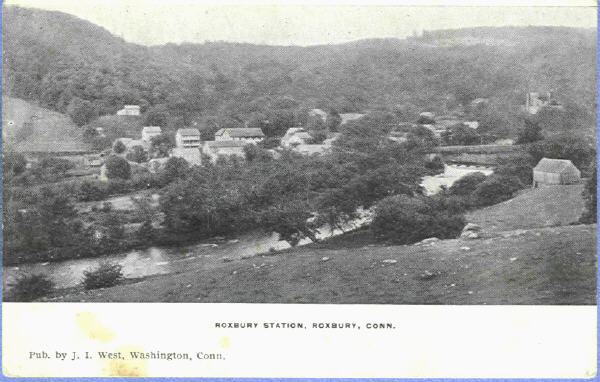
Roxbury Station, c. 1905

Roxbury, whose Native name was Shepaug, a Mahican word signifying "rocky water", was settled about 1713 as a parish of Woodbury, which meant that the parish rate, a household-based tax, supported the local Roxbury puritan church rather than the Woodbury church. About a decade after the end of the American Revolution, Roxbury incorporated as a town in October 1796. Roxbury is either descriptively named, or the name is a transfer from Roxbury, Massachusetts.

Mine Hill and its minerals have been associated with Roxbury since the middle of the 18th century. A silver mine was opened here and was later found to contain spathic iron, specially adapted to steel making, and a small smelting furnace was built. The abundance of granite found in many of Mine Hill's quarries provided the building material for the ore roaster and blast furnace, as well as for such world wonders as the Brooklyn Bridge and Grand Central Terminal in New York City.

== Geography ==
Roxbury is in southern Litchfield County and is bordered to the south by New Haven County. It is 16 miles (26 km) northeast of Danbury and the same distance west of Waterbury. According to the United States Census Bureau, the town has a total area of 26.4 square miles (68.3 km^{2}), of which 0.04 square miles (0.1 km^{2}), or 0.21%, are water.

=== Principal communities ===
- Judd's Bridge
- Roxbury Center
- Roxbury Falls
- Roxbury Station

=== On the National Register of Historic Places ===
Three places in Roxbury are included on the National Register of Historic Places. They are:

- Roxbury Center (CT 67, Weller's Bridge Road, South and Church Streets); 32 buildings in designated local historic district.
- Roxbury Iron Mine and Furnace Complex
- Roxbury Station Historic District (added 2009) (CT 67, Botsford Hill, Hodge, and Mine Hill Roads)

== Demographics ==
Historical population
Year	Pop.	±%
1830	1,122	—
1840	971	−13.5%
1850	1,114	+14.7%
1860	992	−11.0%
1870	919	−7.4%
1880	950	+3.4%
1890	936	−1.5%
1900	1,087	+16.1%
1910	837	−23.0%
1920	647	−22.7%
1930	553	−14.5%
1940	660	+19.3%
1950	740	+12.1%
1960	912	+23.2%
1970	1,238	+35.7%
1980	1,468	+18.6%
1990	1,825	+24.3%
2000	2,136	+17.0%
2010	2,262	+5.9%
2020	2,260	−0.1%

As of the census of 2000, there were 2,136 people, 848 households, and 620 families residing in the town. The population density was 81.4 inhabitants per square mile (31.4/km^{2}). There were 1,018 housing units at an average density of 38.8 per square mile (15.0/km^{2}). The racial makeup of the town was 97.24% White, 0.23% African American, 0.19% Native American, 0.94% Asian, 0.66% from other races, and 0.75% from two or more races. Hispanic or Latino of any race were 1.31% of the population.

There were 848 households, out of which 29.2% had children under the age of 18 living with them, 66.5% were married couples living together, 4.2% had a female householder with no husband present, and 26.8% were non-families. 20.3% of all households were made up of individuals, and 7.1% had someone living alone who was 65 years of age or older. The average household size was 2.52 and the average family size was 2.95.

In the town, the population was spread out, with 22.8% under the age of 18, 3.7% from 18 to 24, 25.5% from 25 to 44, 34.3% from 45 to 64, and 13.8% who were 65 years of age or older. The median age was 44 years. For every 100 females, there were 104.0 males. For every 100 females age 18 and over, there were 102.0 males.

The median income for a household in the town was $87,794, and the median income for a family was $97,672. Males had a median income of $61,477 versus $45,417 for females. The per capita income for the town was $56,769. About 3.0% of families and 3.9% of the population were below the poverty line, including 4.1% of those under age 18 and 6.3% of those age 65 or over.

Registration and Party Enrollment Statistics as of October 17, 2025
Party	Active voters	Inactive voters	Total voters	Percentage
Republican	484	13	497	26.8%
Democratic	595	31	626	33.7%
Unaffiliated	667	36	703	37.9%
Minor parties	28	1	29	1.6%
Total	1,774	81	1,855	100%

== Transportation ==
Connecticut Route 67 is the main thoroughfare in the town, leading west 7 miles (11 km) to New Milford and southeast 8 miles (13 km) to Southbury. The town is also served by secondary highways Route 199 (leading north 5 miles (8 km) to Washington) and Route 317 (leading east 6 miles (10 km) to Woodbury).

=== Roads in Roxbury on the List of Connecticut State Scenic Highways ===
The following roads are Connecticut State Scenic Highways:

- Connecticut Route 317; 0.40 from Painter Hill Road, west to Route 67. (added November 14, 1990)
- Connecticut Route 67; 0.87 mile from Ranny Hill Road, south to 0.30 mile south of Route 317. (added November 14, 1990)
- Connecticut Route 67; 2.90 miles from the Roxbury/Bridgewater Town line, east to Ranny Hill Road. (added August 23, 1996)

== Local media ==
- Waterbury Republican-American, a Waterbury-based independent daily newspaper
- The Danbury News-Times, a Danbury-based daily newspaper
- The Greater New Milford Spectrum, a MediaNews Group-owned weekly paper
- Voices, a local newspaper serving Southbury, Middlebury, Oxford, Seymour, Naugatuck, Woodbury, Bethlehem, New Preston, Washington, Washington Depot, Roxbury, Bridgewater, Monroe, Sandy Hook and Newtown.

== Education ==
Regional School District 12 operates the Booth Free School in Roxbury, as well as the Shepaug Valley School (secondary) in Washington.

== Notable people ==
- Remember Baker (1737–1775), militiaman
- Candace Bushnell, author, journalist and television producer
- Alexander Calder (1898–1976), artist
- Graydon Carter (born 1949), editor, Vanity Fair
- Tom Cole, playwright
- Dustin Hoffman (born 1937), actor
- Elizabeth Hubbard (born 1933), actress, "As the World Turns"
- Lindsey Jacobellis (born 1985), Olympic snowboarder
- Marianna Mayer (born 1945), children's book author and illustrator
- Mercer Mayer (born 1943), children's book author (Little Critter)
- Frank McCourt (1930–2009), author, Angela's Ashes
- Arthur Miller (1915–2005), playwright
- Rebecca Miller (born 1962), actress and filmmaker
- Marilyn Monroe (1926–1962), actress and model
- Inge Morath (1923–2002), Austrian photographer
- Ron Norsworthy (born 1966), visual artist and designer
- Rex Reed (1938-2026), film critic
- Nathan Smith (1770–1835), U.S. senator
- Stephen Sondheim (1930–2021), composer and lyricist
- William Styron (1925–2006), author, Sophie's Choice
- Gay Talese, writer and journalist
- Joe Wanag (born 1966), Olympic athlete
- Seth Warner (1743–1784), Green Mountain Boys
- Richard Widmark (1914–2008), actor
- Betty Gilpin (born 1986), actress
