= Cole White =

American baseball player (born 1985)

- Outfielder
- Born: April 3, 1985 (age 41); Midland, Texas, U.S.
- Bats: Right Throws: Right
- Stats at Baseball Reference

Cole Michael White (born April 3, 1985) is an American former professional baseball outfielder. As a graduate of the United States Military Academy at West Point, he is best known for being one of a few players who sought to delay their entry into military service to begin a professional sports career under conflicting guidelines established in 2005 and 2008.

== Education ==
White grew up in Midland, Texas, and later attended Midland High School. Upon graduation, he attended West Point. Feeling that he "needed to do something" after the September 11, 2001 terrorist attacks, which took place during his junior year of high school, White eventually turned down an offer from Texas Tech University and several junior colleges in favor of Army. Prior to White joining the Army, the only member of his family with any military experience is his grandfather on his mother's side, Michael Carroll, who was in the Navy during World War II.

While at Army, White played baseball for the Army Black Knights. During his college playing career, he was named the 2005 Patriot League Rookie of the Year and the 2007 conference player of the year. He led all Patriot League players in hit-by-pitch during his junior year which earned him the"Stay Tight" team award. He finished what he called "the best four years of his life" baseball-wise by leading his team to the 2008 Patriot League regular-season championship, primarily as a pitcher and outfielder."

== Military service ==
In the spring of 2008, he graduated from West Point and was drafted by the Pittsburgh Pirates that June, and assigned to the State College Spikes. However, due to a United States Army policy, all West Point cadets are required to serve two years of active duty upon graduation. While the Alternative Service Option in 2005 allowed professional athletes to delay this obligation until the conclusion of their playing careers, new guidelines in 2008 stated that any cadet interested in pursuing a professional sports career must serve two years of active duty before applying for a release from the military." Cole though had a five-year commitment to the Army.

The rule states:

Cadets accepted into the program, "will owe two years of active service in the Army, during which time they will be allowed to play their sport in the player-development systems of their respective organizations and be assigned to recruiting stations. If they remain in professional sports following those two years, they will be provided the option of buying out the remaining three years of their active-duty commitment in exchange for six years of reserve time."

Prior to his call-up to the Army, White obtained a .366 batting average in over 71 at-bats with the Spikes. He returned to West Point, where he enrolled in an officer training program while serving as an intern in the athletic department. He later served as a first lieutenant, serving as a tank platoon leader with the 1st Cavalry Division. During his 2-year Army career, White was stationed at West Point, Fort Sill in Oklahoma, Fort Knox in Kentucky and Fort Hood in Texas. He arrived at Fort Hood a month before the 2009 terrorist shootings by Army psychiatrist Major Nidal Malik Hasan."

== Return to baseball ==
In June 2010 the Assistant Secretary of the Army, Thomas R. Lamont, gave White an early release from his 5-year active-duty commitment. He then rejoined the Pirates organization, who reassigned him back to the State College Spikes. At the end of his professional career, White would still owe three more years of service to the Army. In 2010, White had a batting average of .250 in 144 at-bats. In April 2011, White was promoted to Pirates' Single A-Advance team, the Bradenton Marauders. In May 2011 the Pirates moved White down from Bradenton to the Low-A West Virginia Power. At 26, White was the oldest player on the Power roster by more than two years.

However, with the Power, White hit .288 with 23 RBI in 35 games. Once Marauders first baseman Aaron Baker was dealt to the Baltimore Orioles - as part of the Pittsburgh Pirates' trade for Derrek Lee - on July 30, 2011, White returned to Bradenton. In his first 18 at-bats since being called-up, White posted at .440 batting average, going 8–18.

White retired prior to the 2012 season.
