= Summit League baseball tournament =

- Conference baseball championship
- Sport: Baseball
- Conference: Summit League
- Number of teams: 4
- Format: Double-elimination
- Current stadium: Chapman Park
- Current location: Tulsa, Oklahoma
- Played: 1984–present
- Last contest: 2026
- Current champion: South Dakota State (2)
- Most championships: Oral Roberts (22)

Host stadiums
- Chapman Park/J. L. Johnson Stadium (1998-2003, 2005-2006, 2008–2010, 2012, 2016–19, 2022, 2024, 2027); Siebert Field (2026); Tal Anderson Field (2021, 2025); Newman Outdoor Field (2023); Erv Huether Field (2014–15); Oakland University Baseball Field (2013); Sioux Falls Stadium (2011); Alfred D. Boyer Stadium (2007); Fair Grounds Field (2004); Les Miller Field (1997); Riddle–Pace Field (1996); Monier Field (1985, 1995)

Host locations
- Tulsa, OK (1998-2003, 2005-2006, 2008–2010, 2012, 2016–19, 2022, 2024, 2027); Minneapolis, MN (2026); Omaha, NE (2021, 2025); Fargo, ND (2023); Rochester, MI (2013); Sioux Falls, SD (2011, 2014-2015); Macomb, IL (2007); Shreveport, LA (2004); Chicago, IL (1984, 1986-1993, 1997); Troy, AL (1996); Charleston, IL (1985, 1995)

The Summit League baseball tournament is the conference baseball championship of the NCAA Division I's Summit League. The top four finishers in the regular season of the conference's seven teams advance to the double-elimination tournament. In 2027 the tournament will return to Chapman Park in Tulsa, Oklahoma. The winner of the tournament receives an automatic berth to the NCAA Division I Baseball Championship.

The league changed its name from the Mid-Continent Conference prior to the 2008 season. Oral Roberts has won the most championships with 22. South Dakota State (2) is the most recent champion.

== Champions ==
=== By year ===
The following is a list of conference champions and sites listed by year.

Year	Champion	Runner-up	Site	MVP
1984	Southwest Missouri State (Note: Southwest Missouri State is now known as Missouri State)	Northern Iowa	Chicago, IL	N/A
1985	Southwest Missouri State	Eastern Illinois	Monier Field • Charleston, IL	N/A
1986	Southwest Missouri State	Western Illinois	Chicago, IL	Steve Jeffers, Western Illinois
1987	Southwest Missouri State	Eastern Illinois	Chicago, IL	Larry Doss, Missouri State
1988	Southwest Missouri State	Eastern Illinois	Chicago, IL	Tony Floyd, Missouri State
1989	Southwest Missouri State	Eastern Illinois	Chicago, IL	Earnie Johnson, Missouri State
1990	UIC	Southwest Missouri State	Chicago, IL	Kevin Walker, UIC
1991	Akron	UIC	Chicago, IL	Larry Rubin, UIC
1992	Wright State	Akron	Chicago, IL	Jon Sbrocco, Wright State
1993	UIC	Cleveland State	Chicago, IL	Jody Brown, UIC
1994	No tournament held			
1995	Troy	Western Illinois	Monier Field • Charleston, IL	Jason Fawcett, Troy
1996	Northeastern Illinois	Troy State (Note: Troy State is now known as Troy)	Riddle–Pace Field • Troy, AL	Matt Dunne, Northeastern Illinois
1997	Troy State	Northeastern Illinois	Les Miller Field • Chicago, IL	Bryan Kelly, Troy
1998	Oral Roberts	Valparaiso	J. L. Johnson Stadium • Tulsa, OK	Paul Weeks, Oral Roberts
1999	Oral Roberts	Valparaiso	J. L. Johnson Stadium • Tulsa, OK	Ryan Neill, Oral Roberts
2000	Oral Roberts	Southern Utah	J. L. Johnson Stadium • Tulsa, OK	Eric Vandeventer, Oral Roberts
2001	Oral Roberts	Southern Utah	J. L. Johnson Stadium • Tulsa, OK	Trevor Leu, Oral Roberts
2002	Oral Roberts	Southern Utah	J. L. Johnson Stadium • Tulsa, OK	Erick Donaldson, Oral Roberts
2003	Oral Roberts	Southern Utah	J. L. Johnson Stadium • Tulsa, OK	Dennis Bigley, Oral Roberts
2004	Oral Roberts	Southern Utah	Fair Grounds Field • Shreveport, LA	Ricky Rivera, Oral Roberts
2005	Oral Roberts	Centenary	J. L. Johnson Stadium • Tulsa, OK	Michael Hollimon, Oral Roberts
2006	Oral Roberts	Western Illinois	J. L. Johnson Stadium • Tulsa, OK	Sean Jarrett, Oral Roberts
2007	Oral Roberts	Centenary	Alfred D. Boyer Stadium • Macomb, IL	Chad Rothford, Oral Roberts
2008	Oral Roberts	Southern Utah	J. L. Johnson Stadium • Tulsa, OK	Brian Van Kirk, Oral Roberts
2009	Oral Roberts	South Dakota State	J. L. Johnson Stadium • Tulsa, OK	Johnny Roberts, Oral Roberts
2010	Oral Roberts	South Dakota State	J. L. Johnson Stadium • Tulsa, OK	Chris Elder, Oral Roberts
2011	Oral Roberts	South Dakota State	Sioux Falls Stadium • Sioux Falls, SD	Alex Gonzalez, Oral Roberts
2012	Oral Roberts	North Dakota State	J. L. Johnson Stadium • Tulsa, OK	Drew Bowen, Oral Roberts
2013	South Dakota State	North Dakota State	Oakland University Baseball Field • Rochester, MI	Daniel Telford, South Dakota State
2014	North Dakota State	Western Illinois	Sioux Falls Stadium Sioux Falls, SD	Reed Pfannenstein, North Dakota State
2015	Oral Roberts	IPFW	Sioux Falls Stadium Sioux Falls, SD	Derrian James, Oral Roberts
2016	Oral Roberts	IPFW	J. L. Johnson Stadium • Tulsa, OK	Nick Rotola, Oral Roberts
2017	Oral Roberts	North Dakota State	J. L. Johnson Stadium • Tulsa, OK	Miguel Ausua, Oral Roberts
2018	Oral Roberts	South Dakota State	J. L. Johnson Stadium • Tulsa, OK	Cal Hernanez, Oral Roberts
2019	Omaha	Oral Roberts	J. L. Johnson Stadium • Tulsa, OK	Payton Kinney, Omaha
2020	Cancelled due to the coronavirus pandemic			
2021	North Dakota State	Oral Roberts	Tal Anderson Field • Omaha, NE	Jake Malec, North Dakota State
2022	Oral Roberts	Omaha	J. L. Johnson Stadium • Tulsa, OK	Holden Breeze, Oral Roberts
2023	Oral Roberts	South Dakota State	Newman Outdoor Field • Fargo, ND	Justin Quinn, Oral Roberts
2024	Oral Roberts	Northern Colorado	J. L. Johnson Stadium • Tulsa, OK	Drew Stahl, Oral Roberts
2025	North Dakota State	Oral Roberts	Tal Anderson Field • Omaha, NE	Nolan Johnson, North Dakota State
2026	South Dakota State	Oral Roberts	Siebert Field (Note: St. Thomas hosted the tournament on campus of the University of Minnesota) • Minneapolis, MN	Ty Madison, South Dakota State
2027			Chapman Park (Note: Oral Roberts renamed J. L. Johnson Stadium to Chapman Park in February 2025) • Tulsa, OK	

=== By school ===
The following is a list of conference champions listed by school.

School	W	L	PCT	Finals	Championships	Title Years
Akron	7	4	.636	2	1	1991
Missouri State*	23	5	.821	7	6	1984, 1985, 1986, 1987, 1988, 1988
Northern Colorado	3	4	.429	1	0	—
North Dakota State	20	20	.500	6	3	2014, 2021, 2025
Northeastern Illinois	6	2	.750	2	1	1996
Omaha	6	15	.286	2	1	2019
Oral Roberts	82	11	.882	26	22	1998, 1999, 2000, 2001, 2002, 2003, 2004, 2005, 2006, 2007, 2008, 2009, 2010, 2011, 2012, 2015, 2016, 2017, 2018, 2022, 2023, 2024
St. Thomas	0	0	–	0	0	—
South Dakota State	23	28	.451	7	2	2013, 2026
Troy	8	3	.727	3	2	1995, 1997
UIC	13	12	.520	2	1	1990, 1993
Wright State	6	2	.750	1	1	1992

As of May 23, 2026

- Italics indicate that the program is no longer a member of The Summit League.
- Missouri State used to be known as Southwest Missouri State while competing in The Summit League.
