= 2010 Summit League baseball tournament =

- Teams: 4
- Format: Double-elimination
- Finals site: J. L. Johnson Stadium; Tulsa, Oklahoma
- Champions: Oral Roberts (13th title)
- Winning coach: Rob Walton (7th title)
- MVP: Chris Elder, (Oral Roberts)

2010 Summit League baseball standings
	Conf.				Overall
Team	W		L	PCT	W		L	PCT
Oral Roberts ‍†‍‡‍^{y}	19	–	9	.679	36	–	27	.571
South Dakota State ‍†‍‍	19	–	9	.679	39	–	21	.650
Centenary ‍‍‍	17	–	9	.654	28	–	26	.519
Oakland ‍‍‍	13	–	14	.481	23	–	34	.404
IPFW ‍‍‍	13	–	15	.464	17	–	38	.309
North Dakota State ‍‍‍	11	–	16	.407	22	–	30	.423
Southern Utah ‍‍‍	11	–	16	.407	18	–	36	.333
Western Illinois ‍‍‍	6	–	21	.222	14	–	39	.264
‡ – Tournament champion y – Invited to the NCAA tournament As of June 30, 2010; Rankings from Collegiate Baseball

The 2010 Summit League Tournament took place from May 27 through 29. The top four regular season finishers from the regular season met in the double-elimination tournament held at J. L. Johnson Stadium on the campus of Oral Roberts University in Tulsa, Oklahoma. Oral Roberts won the tournament for the thirteenth consecutive time.

== Format and seeding ==
The top four finishers advanced to the tournament. South Dakota State claimed the top seed by tiebreaker. For the first time since joining the conference in 1998, Oral Roberts was not a top seed.

Team	W	L	Pct.	GB	Seed
South Dakota State	19	9	.679	—	1
Oral Roberts	19	9	.679	—	2
Centenary	17	9	.654	1	3
Oakland	13	14	.481	5.5	4
IPFW	13	15	.464	6	—
North Dakota State	11	16	.407	7.5	—
Southern Utah	11	16	.407	7.5	—
Western Illinois	6	21	.222	12.5	—

== Tournament ==
Upper round 1
1	South Dakota State	6
4	Oakland	5
3	Centenary	2
2	Oral Roberts	4
Lower round 1
4	Oakland	7
3	Centenary	2

Upper final
1	South Dakota State	6
2	Oral Roberts	21
Lower final
1	South Dakota State	20
4	Oakland	4

Final
2	Oral Roberts	12
1	South Dakota State	2

=== Game-by-game results ===
Game	Winner	Score	Loser	Comment
1	(1) South Dakota State	6–5	(4) Oakland	
2	(2) Oral Roberts	4–2	(3) Centenary	
3	(4) Oakland	7–2	(3) Centenary	Centenary eliminated
4	(2) Oral Roberts	21–6	(1) South Dakota State	
5	(1) South Dakota State	20–4	(4) Oakland	Oakland eliminated
6	(2) Oral Roberts	12–2	(1) South Dakota State	Oral Roberts wins Summit Championship

== All-Tournament Team ==
Name	School
Keegan Acker	Centenary
Nick Baligod	Oral Roberts
Joel Blake	South Dakota State
Chris Elder	Oral Roberts
Seth Furmanek	Oral Roberts
Beau Hanowski	South Dakota State
Connor Mielock	Oakland
Zach Rhodes	South Dakota State
Tim Ryan	Oakland
P.J. Sequeira	Oral Roberts
Bryce Smolen	Oral Roberts
Brett Sowers	Oral Roberts
Billy Stitz	South Dakota State
Kyle Teague	Oakland

=== Tournament Most Valuable Player ===
Chris Elder of Oral Roberts was named Tournament MVP.
