= 2011 Summit League baseball tournament =

- Teams: 4
- Format: Double-elimination
- Finals site: Sioux Falls Stadium; Sioux Falls, SD
- Champions: Oral Roberts (14th title)
- Winning coach: Rob Walton (8th title)
- MVP: Alex Gonzalez (Oral Roberts)

2011 Summit League baseball standings
	Conf.						Overall
Team	W		L		T	PCT	W		L		T	PCT
Oral Roberts ‍†‍‡‍^{y}	21	–	7	–	0	.750	39	–	22	–	0	.639
South Dakota State ‍‍‍	20	–	8	–	0	.714	37	–	20	–	0	.649
North Dakota State ‍‍‍	15	–	12	–	0	.556	22	–	32	–	0	.407
Western Illinois ‍‍‍	13	–	15	–	0	.464	21	–	38	–	0	.356
IPFW ‍‍‍	12	–	16	–	0	.429	17	–	34	–	0	.333
Southern Utah ‍‍‍	11	–	17	–	0	.393	23	–	31	–	0	.426
Oakland ‍‍‍	10	–	18	–	0	.357	19	–	31	–	0	.380
Centenary ‍‍‍	9	–	18	–	0	.333	12	–	31	–	0	.279
† – Conference champion ‡ – Tournament champion y – Invited to the NCAA tournament As of March 10, 2019; Rankings from Collegiate Baseball

The 2011 Summit League baseball tournament took place from May 24 through 26. The top four regular season finishers of the league's seven teams met in the double-elimination tournament held at the City of Sioux Falls, South Dakota's Sioux Falls Stadium. Oral Roberts won their fourteenth consecutive championship, claiming the tournament title every year but one of the fifteenth seasons that they have been in the league, and represented The Summit League in the 2011 NCAA Division I baseball tournament.

== Seeding ==
The top four finishers from the regular season will be seeded one through four.

Team	W	L	Pct.	GB	Seed
Oral Roberts	21	7	.750	–	1
South Dakota State	20	8	.714	1	2
North Dakota State	15	12	.556	6.5	3
Western Illinois	13	15	.464	8	4
IPFW	12	16	.429	9	–
Southern Utah	11	17	.393	10	–
Oakland	10	18	.357	11	–
Centenary	9	18	.333	11.5	–

== Results ==
Upper round 1
4	Western Illinois	0
1	Oral Roberts	12
3	North Dakota State	1
2	South Dakota State	4
Lower round 1
1	Oral Roberts	7
2	South Dakota State	4

Upper final
2	South Dakota State	4
1	Oral Roberts	7
Lower final
2	South Dakota State	13
3	North Dakota State	10

Final
1	Oral Roberts	5
2	South Dakota State	4

== Most Valuable Player ==
Alex Gonzalez was named Tournament Most Valuable Player. Gonzalez played for Oral Roberts.
