= 2009 Summit League baseball tournament =

- Teams: 4
- Format: Double-elimination
- Finals site: J. L. Johnson Stadium; Tulsa, Oklahoma
- Champions: Oral Roberts (12th title)
- Winning coach: Rob Walton (6th title)
- MVP: Johnny Roberts (Oral Roberts)

2009 Summit League baseball standings
	Conf.				Overall
Team	W		L	PCT	W		L	PCT
Oral Roberts ‍†‍‡‍^{y}	16	–	2	.889	33	–	15	.688
Southern Utah ‍‍‍	15	–	7	.682	27	–	24	.529
South Dakota State ‍‍‍	17	–	10	.630	26	–	30	.464
Centenary ‍‍‍	16	–	10	.615	33	–	19	.635
North Dakota State ‍‍‍	10	–	14	.417	16	–	28	.364
Oakland ‍‍‍	10	–	18	.357	22	–	34	.393
Western Illinois ‍‍‍	8	–	16	.333	13	–	33	.283
IPFW ‍‍‍	6	–	21	.222	13	–	38	.255
‡ – Tournament champion y – Invited to the NCAA tournament As of June 30, 2009; Rankings from Collegiate Baseball

The 2009 Summit League Tournament took place from May 21 through 23. The top four regular season finishers from the regular season met in the double-elimination tournament held at J. L. Johnson Stadium on the campus of Oral Roberts University in Tulsa, Oklahoma. Oral Roberts won the tournament for the twelfth consecutive time.

== Format and seeding ==
The top four finishers advanced to the tournament.

Team	W	L	Pct.	GB	Seed
Oral Roberts	16	2	.889	—	1
Southern Utah	15	7	.682	3	2
South Dakota State	17	10	.630	3.5	3
Centenary	16	10	.615	4	4
North Dakota State	10	14	.417	9	—
Oakland	10	18	.357	11	—
Western Illinois	8	16	.333	11	—
IPFW	6	21	.222	14.5	—

== Tournament ==
Upper round 1
1	Oral Roberts	8
4	Centenary	1
3	South Dakota State	8
2	Southern Utah	11
Lower round 1
4	Centenary	3
3	South Dakota State	7^{10}

Upper final
1	Oral Roberts	9
2	Southern Utah	6
Lower final
2	Southern Utah	4
3	South Dakota State	9

Final
1	Oral Roberts	6
3	South Dakota State	2

=== Game-by-game results ===
Game	Winner	Score	Loser	Comment
1	(2) Southern Utah	11–8	(3) South Dakota State	
2	(1) Oral Roberts	9–1	(4) Centenary	
3	(3) South Dakota State	7–3^{10}	(4) Centenary	Centenary eliminated
4	(1) Oral Roberts	9–6	(2) Southern Utah	
5	(3) South Dakota State	9–4	(2) Southern Utah	Southern Utah eliminated
6	(1) Oral Roberts	6–2	(3) South Dakota State	Oral Roberts wins Summit Championship

== All-Tournament Team ==
Name	School
Bucky Aona	Southern Utah
Joel Blake	South Dakota State
Tyler Garewal	Oral Roberts
Andre Lamontagne	Oral Roberts
Juan Martinez	Oral Roberts
Kyle Melling	Southern Utah
Colby Price	Oral Roberts
Johnny Roberts	Oral Roberts
Jesse Sawyer	South Dakota State
Layne Somsen	South Dakota State
Billy Stitz	South Dakota State
Jerry Sullivan	Oral Roberts
Caleb Thielbar	South Dakota State
Boone Whiting	Centenary

=== Tournament Most Valuable Player ===
Johnny Roberts of Oral Roberts was named Tournament MVP.
