= 2008 Summit League baseball tournament =

- Teams: 4
- Format: Double-elimination
- Finals site: J. L. Johnson Stadium; Tulsa, Oklahoma
- Champions: Oral Roberts (11th title)
- Winning coach: Rob Walton (5th title)
- MVP: Brian Van Kirk (Oral Roberts)

2008 Summit League baseball standings
	Conf.				Overall
Team	W		L	PCT	W		L	PCT
Oral Roberts ‍†‍‡‍^{y}	24	–	4	.857	48	–	14	.774
Southern Utah ‍‍‍	16	–	11	.593	31	–	28	.525
Western Illinois ‍‍‍	13	–	11	.542	21	–	33	.389
Centenary ‍‍‍	13	–	15	.464	30	–	26	.536
South Dakota State ‍‍‍	9	–	11	.450	22	–	27	.449
IPFW ‍‍‍	10	–	17	.370	14	–	36	.280
Oakland ‍‍‍	7	–	14	.333	15	–	30	.333
North Dakota State ‍‍‍	7	–	16	.304	15	–	30	.333
‡ – Tournament champion y – Invited to the NCAA tournament As of June 30, 2008; Rankings from Collegiate Baseball

The 2008 Summit League Tournament took place from May 22 through 24. The top four regular season finishers from the regular season met in the double-elimination tournament held at J. L. Johnson Stadium on the campus of Oral Roberts University in Tulsa, Oklahoma. Oral Roberts won the tournament for the eleventh consecutive time.

== Format and seeding ==
The top four finishers advanced to the tournament. North Dakota State and South Dakota State were ineligible for postseason play as they reclassified to Division I.

Team	W	L	Pct.	GB	Seed
Oral Roberts	24	4	.857	—	1
Southern Utah	16	11	.593	7.5	2
Western Illinois	13	11	.542	9	3
Centenary	13	15	.464	11	4
South Dakota State	9	11	.450	11	—
IPFW	10	17	.370	13.5	—
Oakland	7	14	.333	13.5	—
North Dakota State	7	16	.304	14.5	—

== Tournament ==
Upper round 1
1	Oral Roberts	11
4	Centenary	5
3	Western Illinois	9
2	Southern Utah	6
Lower round 1
4	Centenary	1
2	Southern Utah	4

Upper final
1	Oral Roberts	15^{10}
3	Western Illinois	9
Lower final
3	Western Illinois	3
2	Southern Utah	9

Final
1	Oral Roberts	9
2	Southern Utah	0

=== Game-by-game results ===
Game	Winner	Score	Loser	Comment
1	(3) Western Illinois	9–6	(3) Southern Utah	
2	(1) Oral Roberts	11–5	(4) Centenary	
3	(2) Southern Utah	4–1	(4) Centenary	Centenary eliminated
4	(1) Oral Roberts	15–9^{10}	(3) Western Illinois	
5	(2) Southern Utah	9–3	(3) Western Illinois	Western Illinois eliminated
6	(1) Oral Roberts	9–0	(2) Southern Utah	Oral Roberts wins Summit Championship

== All-Tournament Team ==
Name	School
Ryan Bernsen	Centenary
Brendan Duffy	Oral Roberts
Nick Freitas	Southern Utah
David Genao	Oral Roberts
Drew Laidig	Western Illinois
Juan Martinez	Oral Roberts
Kelly Minissale	Oral Roberts
Mac Nelson	Southern Utah
Todd Nelson	Western Illinois
Jacob Noyes	Southern Utah
Ben Petralli	Oral Roberts
Jerry Sullivan	Oral Roberts
Brian Van Kirk	Oral Roberts
Cole Waddell	Western Illinois

=== Tournament Most Valuable Player ===
Brian Van Kirk of Oral Roberts was named Tournament MVP.
