= Ryan Brownlee =

American baseball coach (born 1974)

Biographical details
- Born: June 14, 1974 (age 52); Evansville, Indiana, U.S.

Playing career
- 1994–1997: Evansville
- 1997: Evansville Otters
- Position: Second baseman

Coaching career (HC unless noted)
- 1998–1999: Evansville (assistant)
- 2000–2003: James Madison (assistant)
- 2004–2012: Iowa (assistant)
- 2013–2019: Western Illinois

Head coaching record
- Overall: 128–232
- Tournaments: Summit: 3–10; NCAA: 0–0

Ryan Brownlee (born June 14, 1974) in an American college baseball coach and former professional second baseman.

== Playing career ==
A native of Evansville, Indiana, Brownlee played four seasons of college baseball under his father Jim at the University of Evansville. In 1996, he played collegiate summer baseball with the Cotuit Kettleers of the Cape Cod Baseball League. Brownlee went on to play one professional season in 1997 with the independent Evansville Otters.

== Coaching career ==
Brownlee coached two seasons with the Purple Aces before moving to James Madison in 2000, where he remained for four seasons. Brownlee moved to Iowa in 2004, and added recruiting coordinator duties during his nine seasons with the Hawkeyes. During that time, 32 players he recruited or coached were drafted by Major League teams. In September 2012, he was named to his first head coaching position with the Western Illinois Leathernecks baseball program. He then served as the head coach of the Western Illinois Leathernecks.

== Head coaching record ==
Record table
Season	Team	Overall	Conference	Standing	Postseason
Western Illinois Leathernecks (Summit League) (2013–2019)
2013	Western Illinois	19–37	9–17	5th	Summit League Tournament (Note: The top four finishers of the Summit League's six teams, excluding Nebraska–Omaha which was reclassifying to Division I and therefore ineligible, qualified for the tournament in 2013.)
2014	Western Illinois	21–32	11–13	T–3rd	Summit League Tournament (Note: The top four finishers of the Summit League's six teams, excluding Nebraska–Omaha which was reclassifying to Division I and therefore ineligible, qualified for the tournament in 2014.)
2015	Western Illinois	17–33	10–20	6th	
2016	Western Illinois	14–36	11–19	6th	
2017	Western Illinois	18–32	12–15	4th	Summit League Tournament
2018	Western Illinois	17–31	14–12	4th	Summit League Tournament
2019	Western Illinois	22–31	16–14	4th	Summit League Tournament
Western Illinois:		128–232	83–110		
Total:		128–232			

== See also ==
- List of current NCAA Division I baseball coaches
