= 2016 Summit League baseball tournament =

- Teams: 4
- Format: Double-elimination
- Finals site: J. L. Johnson Stadium; Tulsa, OK
- Champions: Oral Roberts (17th title)
- Winning coach: Ryan Folmar (2nd title)
- MVP: Nick Rotola (Oral Roberts)

2016 Summit League baseball standings
	Conf.				Overall
Team	W		L	PCT	W		L	PCT
Oral Roberts ‍†‍‡‍^{y}	22	–	8	.733	38	–	21	.644
Omaha ‍‍‍	18	–	12	.600	28	–	28	.500
IPFW ‍‍‍	14	–	16	.467	33	–	26	.559
South Dakota State ‍‍‍	13	–	17	.433	22	–	35	.386
North Dakota State ‍‍‍	12	–	18	.400	29	–	25	.537
Western Illinois ‍‍‍	11	–	19	.367	14	–	36	.280
† – Conference champion ‡ – Tournament champion y – Invited to the NCAA tournament As of June 11, 2016; Rankings from Collegiate Baseball

The 2016 Summit League baseball tournament was a tournament that took place from May 25-28, 2016. The top four regular season finishers of the league's six teams met in the double-elimination tournament held at J. L. Johnson Stadium on the campus of Oral Roberts in Tulsa, Oklahoma. The champion of the tournament was Oral Roberts, beating IPFW for the title. They subsequently earned a bid to the 2016 NCAA Division I baseball tournament.

== Seeding ==
The top four finishers from the regular season were seeded one through four based on conference winning percentage during the double round robin regular season. The teams played in a double elimination tournament.

Team	W	L	Pct	GB	Seed
Oral Roberts	22	8	.733	—	1
Omaha	18	12	.600	4	2
IPFW	14	16	.467	8	3
South Dakota State	13	17	.433	9	4
North Dakota State	12	18	.400	10	—
Western Illinois	11	19	.367	11	—

== Results ==
First round
1	Oral Roberts	6
4	South Dakota State	5
3	IPFW	8
2	Omaha	6
Lower round 1
4	South Dakota State	8
2	Omaha	0

Semi-finals
1	Oral Roberts	5
3	IPFW	6
Lower final
4	South Dakota State	2
1	Oral Roberts	5

Finals
3	IPFW	1	3
1	Oral Roberts	4	14
