= 2012 Summit League baseball tournament =

- Teams: 4
- Format: Double-elimination
- Finals site: J. L. Johnson Stadium; Oklahoma City, Oklahoma
- Champions: Oral Roberts (15th title)
- Winning coach: Rob Walton (9th title)
- MVP: Drew Bowen (Oral Roberts)

2012 Summit League baseball standings
	Conf.						Overall
Team	W		L		T	PCT	W		L		T	PCT
Oral Roberts ‍†‍‡‍^{y}	17	–	6	–	0	.739	38	–	25	–	0	.603
Oakland ‍‍‍	15	–	6	–	0	.714	25	–	31	–	0	.446
North Dakota State ‍‍‍	14	–	10	–	0	.583	40	–	20	–	0	.667
Southern Utah ‍‍‍	12	–	11	–	0	.522	18	–	36	–	0	.333
IPFW ‍‍‍	8	–	16	–	0	.333	16	–	40	–	0	.286
South Dakota State ‍‍‍	7	–	14	–	0	.333	18	–	33	–	1	.356
Western Illinois ‍‍‍	7	–	17	–	0	.292	17	–	35	–	1	.330
† – Conference champion ‡ – Tournament champion y – Invited to the NCAA tournament As of June 30, 2012; Rankings from Collegiate Baseball

The 2012 Summit League baseball tournament took place from May 24 to 26. The top four regular season finishers of the league's seven teams met in the double-elimination tournament held at Oral Roberts University's J. L. Johnson Stadium. Oral Roberts won their fifteenth consecutive championship, claiming the tournament title every year but one of the sixteen seasons that they have been in the league, and will represent The Summit League in the 2012 NCAA Division I baseball tournament.

== Seeding ==
The top four finishers from the regular season will be seeded one through four.

Team	W	L	Pct.	GB	Seed
Oral Roberts	17	6	.739	–	1
Oakland	15	6	.714	1	2
North Dakota State	14	10	.583	3.5	3
Southern Utah	12	11	.522	5	4
IPFW	8	16	.333	9.5	–
South Dakota State	7	14	.333	9	–
Western Illinois	7	17	.292	10.5	–

== Results ==
Upper round 1
4	Southern Utah	1
1	Oral Roberts	2
3	North Dakota State	3
2	Oakland	2
Lower round 1
2	Oakland	4
4	Southern Utah	2

Upper final
1	Oral Roberts	3
3	North Dakota State	4
Lower final
2	Oakland	2
1	Oral Roberts	3

Final
1	Oral Roberts	4	4
3	North Dakota State	1	3

== All-Tournament Team ==
The following players were named to the All-Tournament Team.

Name	School
Simon Anderson	North Dakota State
Drew Bowen	Oral Roberts
Tim Colwell	North Dakota State
Jason Hager	Oakland
Nolan Jacoby	Oakland
Brandon King	Oral Roberts
Kyle Kingsley	North Dakota State
Kyle Kleinendorst	North Dakota State
Brad Royer	Southern Utah
Tim Ryan	Oakland
Jared Schlehuber	Oral Roberts
Joe Spring	Oral Roberts
Mike Torrence	Oral Roberts
Jose Trevino	Oral Roberts

== Most Valuable Player ==
Drew Bowen was named Tournament Most Valuable Player. Bowen played for Oral Roberts and earned the save in the championship game.
