= 2017 Summit League baseball tournament =

- Teams: 4
- Format: Double-elimination
- Finals site: J. L. Johnson Stadium; Tulsa, Oklahoma
- Champions: Oral Roberts (18th title)
- Winning coach: Ryan Folmar (3rd title)
- MVP: Miguel Ausua (Oral Roberts)

2017 Summit League baseball standings
	Conf.				Overall
Team	W		L	PCT	W		L	PCT
Oral Roberts ‍†‍‡‍^{y}	25	–	4	.862	42	–	14	.750
North Dakota State ‍‍‍	19	–	11	.633	31	–	25	.554
South Dakota State ‍‍‍	18	–	12	.600	26	–	24	.520
Western Illinois ‍‍‍	12	–	15	.444	18	–	32	.360
Omaha ‍‍‍	9	–	19	.321	12	–	40	.231
Fort Wayne ‍‍‍	4	–	26	.133	9	–	43	.173
† – Conference champion ‡ – Tournament champion y – Invited to the NCAA Division I Baseball Championship; As of May 27, 2017; Rankings from Collegiate Baseball

The 2017 Summit League baseball tournament took place from May 24 through 27. The top four regular season finishers of the league's six teams met in the double-elimination tournament held at J. L. Johnson Stadium on the campus of Oral Roberts in Tulsa, Oklahoma. The winner of the tournament will earn the Summit League's automatic bid to the 2017 NCAA Division I baseball tournament.

== Seeding ==
The top four finishers from the regular season will be seeded one through four based on conference winning percentage during the double round robin regular season. The teams will then play a double elimination tournament.

== Results ==
First round
1	Oral Roberts	5
4	Western Illinois	2
3	South Dakota State	6
2	North Dakota State	5
Lower round 1
4	Western Illinois	4
2	North Dakota State	11

Semi-finals
1	Oral Roberts	5
3	South Dakota State	3
Lower final
2	North Dakota State	8
3	South Dakota State	2

Finals
1	Oral Roberts	7
2	North Dakota State	0
