= 2013 Summit League baseball tournament =

Amateur baseball tournament

- Teams: 4
- Format: Double-elimination
- Finals site: Oakland University Baseball Field; Rochester, MI
- Champions: South Dakota State (1st title)
- Winning coach: Dave Schrage (1st title)
- MVP: Daniel Telford (South Dakota State)

2013 Summit League baseball standings
	Conf.				Overall
Team	W		L	PCT	W		L	PCT
Nebraska–Omaha ‍†‍‍	20	–	6	.769	27	–	22	.551
South Dakota State ‍‍‡‍^{y}	16	–	10	.615	35	–	24	.593
Oakland ‍‍‍	15	–	13	.536	20	–	33	.377
North Dakota State ‍‍‍	11	–	13	.458	24	–	25	.490
Western Illinois ‍‍‍	9	–	17	.346	19	–	35	.352
IPFW ‍‍‍	9	–	21	.300	22	–	32	.407
† – Conference champion ‡ – Tournament champion y – Invited to the NCAA tournament As of June 30, 2013; Rankings from Collegiate Baseball

The 2013 Summit League baseball tournament took place from May 23 through 26. The top four regular season finishers of the league's five eligible teams met in the double-elimination tournament held at Oakland University Baseball Field in Rochester, Michigan. Nebraska–Omaha was not eligible. South Dakota State claimed their first tournament championship and earned the Summit League's automatic bid to the 2013 NCAA Division I baseball tournament.

== Seeding ==
The top four finishers from the regular season were seeded one through four based on conference winning percentage. The teams then played a double elimination tournament. Nebraska–Omaha, in its first year in the Summit League and second at the Division I level, was not eligible for the tournament due to NCAA reclassification rules.

Team	W	L	Pct.	GB	Seed
Nebraska–Omaha	20	6	.769	–	–
South Dakota State	16	10	.615	4	1
Oakland	15	13	.536	6	2
North Dakota State	11	13	.458	8	3
Western Illinois	9	17	.346	11	4
IPFW	9	21	.300	13	–

== Results ==
First round
1	South Dakota State	2
4	Western Illinois	4
2	Oakland	0
3	North Dakota State	2
Lower round 1
1	South Dakota State	8
2	Oakland	4

Semi-finals
4	Western Illinois	0
3	North Dakota State	3
Lower final
1	South Dakota State	5
4	Western Illinois	4

Finals
3	North Dakota State	0	0
1	South Dakota State	2	1

== All-Tournament Team ==
The following players were named to the All-Tournament Team.

Name	School
Stephen Bougher	South Dakota State
Dan Dispensa	Western Illinois
Kolton Emery	South Dakota State
David Ernst	North Dakota State
Tanner Glore	Western Illinois
Jason Hager	Oakland
Nolan Jacoby	Oakland
Kyle Kleinendorst	North Dakota State
Aaron Michel	Western Illinois
J. D. Moore	South Dakota State
Wes Satzinger	North Dakota State
Scott Splett	South Dakota State
John Straka	North Dakota State
Daniel Telford	South Dakota State

=== Most Valuable Player ===
Daniel Telford of South Dakota State was named Tournament Most Valuable Player, recording a pair of doubles and driving in the only run of the championship game.
