= Ritchie Price =

American college baseball coach (born 1984)

Current position
- Title: Hitting coach
- Team: Fresno State
- Conference: Pac-12

Biographical details
- Born: July 13, 1984 (age 42); Palo Alto, California, U.S.

Playing career
- 2003–2006: Kansas
- 2006: Brooklyn Cyclones
- 2006: Kingsport Mets
- Position: Shortstop

Coaching career (HC unless noted)
- 2007–2008: South Dakota State (GA)
- 2009–2011: South Dakota State
- 2012–2022: Kansas (asst)
- 2023–present: Fresno State (H)

Head coaching record
- Overall: 102–71
- Tournaments: Summit: 6–7; NCAA: 0–0

Accomplishments and honors

Championships
- Summit League (2010)

Awards
- Summit League Coach of the Year (2010)

Ritchie L. Price (born July 13, 1984) is an American college baseball coach and former shortstop. He is an assistant baseball coach at Fresno State University. Price played college baseball at the University of Kansas before pursuing a professional career. Price was the head baseball coach at South Dakota State University from 2007 to 2011.

== Amateur career ==
Price attended San Luis Obispo High School in San Luis Obispo, California. Playing for the school's varsity baseball team for three years, he recorded a .392 batting average and 24 career stolen bases. Upon graduation, he enrolled at the University of Kansas, to play college baseball for the Kansas Jayhawks baseball team.

As a freshman at Kansas in 2003, Price had a .319 batting average, a .400 on-base percentage (OBP), and a .366 SLG, with eleven doubles. He was named an All-Big 12 Conference honorable mention at shortstop.

As a sophomore in 2004, Price batted .339 with a .399 SLG, 1 home run, and 47 RBIs. He was named second team All-Big 12 and he also set a school record for hits by a sophomore with 84.

In the 2005 season as a junior, Price hit 2 home runs and 14 doubles. He was named a Big 12 honorable mention. Following his junior season at Kansas, Price played collegiate summer baseball for the Yarmouth–Dennis Red Sox of the Cape Cod Baseball League, where he batted 6-for-24 (.250) and had a .471 OBP.

Price returned to school for a senior season in 2006, helping the Jayhawks to their first-ever Big 12 Conference Tournament championship and third ever NCAA Tournament appearance.

== Professional career ==
The New York Mets chose Price with the eighteenth pick of the 18th round of the 2006 Major League Baseball draft. Price began his professional career with the Brooklyn Cyclones of the Class A-Short Season New York–Penn League, where he batted .000 with one run scored. He was demoted to the Kingsport Mets of the Rookie Appalachian League on June 29. He hit .252 with three doubles for Kingston.

== Coaching career ==
In 2007, Price was named a graduate assistant at South Dakota State.

On June 15, 2008, Price was named the full-time head coach of the Jackrabbits.

On June 30, 2011, Price was named an assistant coach for the Kansas Jayhawks baseball team.

== Head coaching record ==
Record table
Season	Team	Overall	Conference	Standing	Postseason
South Dakota State Jackrabbits (Summit League) (2009–2011)
2009	South Dakota State	26–30	17–10	3rd	Summit Tournament
2010	South Dakota State	39–21	19–9	1st	Summit Tournament
2011	South Dakota State	37–20	20–8	2nd	Summit Tournament
South Dakota State:		102–71	56–27		
Total:		102–71			
National champion Postseason invitational champion Conference regular season champion Conference regular season and conference tournament champion Division regular season champion Division regular season and conference tournament champion Conference tournament champion
