= Dave Schrage =

American college baseball coach

Playing career
- 1980–1983: Creighton
- Position: OF

Coaching career (HC unless noted)
- 1984: St. Thomas (FL) (Asst.)
- 1985–1986: Creighton (Asst.)
- 1988–1990: Waldorf
- 1991–1999: Northern Iowa
- 2000–2002: Northern Illinois
- 2003–2006: Evansville
- 2007–2010: Notre Dame
- 2012–2016: South Dakota State
- 2017–2022: Butler

Head coaching record
- Overall: 804–870–3 (NCAA) 61-66 (NAIA)

Accomplishments and honors

Awards
- MVC Coach of the Year: 1995, 1997

Dave Schrage is an American baseball coach and former outfielder. He played college baseball at Creighton University for head coach Dave Underwood from 1980 to 1983. He then served as the head coach of the Waldorf Warriors (1988–1990), Northern Iowa Panthers (1991–1999), Northern Illinois Huskies (2000–2002), Evansville Purple Aces (2003–2006), Notre Dame Fighting Irish (2007–2010) South Dakota State Jackrabbits (2012–2016) and the Butler Bulldogs (2017–2022).

== Playing career ==
Schrage played four seasons as an outfielder at Creighton from 1980 to 1983, earning all-conference and Academic All-American honors. He hit .400 or higher in both his junior and senior seasons.

== Coaching career ==
After completing his degree at Creighton, Schrage accepted a position as a graduate assistant at St. Thomas, working for Paul Mainieri in 1984. The following season, he returned to Creighton as an assistant coach before coaching the Queensland Rams club team in Australia. He earned his first head coaching job at Waldorf, then a junior college in 1987. After three seasons and a 61–66 record, Schrage moved to Northern Iowa. He would remain with the Panthers for nine seasons, improving the team's win totals from 2 to 18 during his tenure and earning a pair of Missouri Valley Conference Coach of the Year awards. He would be honored as the only person to be named All-Conference and Coach of the Year in baseball by the MVC at their Centennial Celebration. From 2000 to 2002, Schrage served as head coach at Northern Illinois. He took over a team that recorded only 4 wins the previous season and guided them to 24 wins in his first year and a winning season in his second. He was named runner-up for the National Coach of the Year Award by Collegiate Baseball. Schrage then moved to Evansville, where he led the Purple Aces to 130 wins and a regional final in the 2006 NCAA tournament. Schrage then earned what he called his dream job, succeeding Mainieri as head coach at Notre Dame. Prior to coaching a game, his wife Jody died from cancer. Schrage was not able to continue Mainieri's success with the Irish, and was fired after four years. During his one year absence, he spent time with the Dowagiac Union high School (MI) where fellow Notre Dame coach was the Athletic Director. He was hired to coach the Jackrabbits in the summer of 2011. After coaching the Jackrabbits to a 136–144–1 record over the past 5 seasons, on July 5, 2016, he was hired to be the head coach of Butler University within the Big East conference. Retired from coaching on 5/21/22

== Head coaching record ==
Below is a table of Schrage's yearly records as a head baseball coach.

Record table
Season	Team	Overall	Conference	Standing	Postseason
Waldorf Warriors (Iowa Community College Athletic Conference) (1988–1990)
Waldorf:		61–66			
Northern Iowa (Mid-Continent Conference) (1991)
1991	Northern Iowa	13–44	1–9	3rd (Gray)	Mid-Con Tournament
Northern Iowa Panthers (Missouri Valley Conference) (1992–1999)
1992	Northern Iowa	22–34	2–17	8th	
1993	Northern Iowa	12–39	1–20	8th	
1994	Northern Iowa	24–32	5–16	T-7th	
1995	Northern Iowa	24–32	12–20	T-7th	
1996	Northern Iowa	26–32	13–19	6th	MVC Tournament
1997	Northern Iowa	32–23	18–8	2nd	MVC Tournament
1998	Northern Iowa	26–30	9–22	8th	
1999	Northern Iowa	28–26	13–17	7th	
Northern Iowa:		211–292	74–148		
Northern Illinois Huskies (Mid-American Conference) (2000–2002)
2000	Northern Illinois	24–33	11–15	3rd (West)	MAC Tournament
2001	Northern Illinois	28–27	10–17	T-5th (West)	
2002	Northern Illinois	23–32	11–14	5th (West)	
Northern Illinois:		75–92	32–46		
Evansville Purple Aces (Missouri Valley Conference) (2003–2006)
2003	Evansville	24–31	12–20	9th	
2004	Evansville	28–32	12–20	T-5th	MVC Tournament
2005	Evansville	35–22	12–12	4th	MVC Tournament
2006	Evansville	43–22	16–8	1st	NCAA Regional
Evansville:		130–108	52–60		
Notre Dame Fighting Irish (Big East Conference) (2007–2010)
2007	Notre Dame	28–28	11–15	7th (12)	Big East tournament (Note: The top 8 finishers of the Big East's 12 teams qualified for the tournament in 2007.)
2008	Notre Dame	33–21–1	16–10	3rd (12)	Big East tournament (Note: The top 8 finishers of the Big East's 12 teams qualified for the tournament in 2008.)
2009	Notre Dame	36–23	15–12	5th (12)	Big East tournament (Note: The top 8 finishers of the Big East's 12 teams qualified for the tournament in 2009.)
2010	Notre Dame	22–32	10–17	9th (12)	
Notre Dame:		119–104–1	52–54		
South Dakota State Jackrabbits (Summit League) (2012–2016)
2012	South Dakota State	18–33–1	7–14	6th (7)	
2013	South Dakota State	35–24	16–10	2nd (6)	NCAA Regional
2014	South Dakota State	28–29	11–11	2nd (5)	Summit tournament
2015	South Dakota State	33–23	17–11	2nd (6)	Summit tournament
2016	South Dakota State	22–35	13–17	4th (6)	Summit tournament
South Dakota State:		136–144-1	64–63		
Butler Bulldogs (Big East Conference) (2017–2022)
2017	Butler	31–20	7–10	5th	
2018	Butler	34–20	9–8	3rd	
2019	Butler	26–26	6–11	6th	
2020	Butler	8–6	0–0		Season canceled due to COVID-19
2021	Butler	14–23	8–13	7th	
2022	Butler	20–35–1	4–16–1	8th	
Butler:		133–130-1	34–58-1		
Total:		804–870–3			
National champion Postseason invitational champion Conference regular season champion Conference regular season and conference tournament champion Division regular season champion Division regular season and conference tournament champion Conference tournament champion

== Personal ==
Schrage's wife Jody died on January 9, 2007. They had two daughters, Kaitlyn and Brianne.
