= 2006 Mid-Continent Conference baseball tournament =

- Teams: 4
- Format: Double-elimination
- Finals site: J. L. Johnson Stadium; Tulsa, Oklahoma
- Champions: Oral Roberts (9th title)
- Winning coach: Rob Walton (3rd title)
- MVP: Sean Jarrett (Oral Roberts)

2006 Mid-Continent Conference baseball standings
	Conf.				Overall
Team	W		L	PCT	W		L	PCT
No. 14 Oral Roberts ‍†‍‡‍^{y}	17	–	2	.895	41	–	16	.719
Western Illinois ‍‍‍	14	–	8	.636	32	–	32	.500
Oakland ‍‍‍	13	–	11	.542	20	–	38	.345
Centenary ‍‍‍	11	–	11	.500	23	–	30	.434
Southern Utah ‍‍‍	11	–	13	.458	26	–	28	.481
Valparaiso ‍‍‍	9	–	14	.391	17	–	34	.333
Chicago State ‍‍‍	2	–	18	.100	7	–	4	.636
‡ – Tournament champion y – Invited to the NCAA tournament As of June 30, 2006; Rankings from Collegiate Baseball

The 2006 Mid-Continent Conference Tournament took place from May 25 through 27. The top four regular season finishers from the regular season met in the double-elimination tournament held at J. L. Johnson Stadium on the campus of Oral Roberts University in Tulsa, Oklahoma. Oral Roberts won the tournament for the ninth consecutive time.

== Format and seeding ==
The top four finishers advanced to the tournament.

Team	W	L	Pct.	GB	Seed
Oral Roberts	17	2	.895	—	1
Western Illinois	14	8	.636	4.5	2
Oakland	12	11	.542	7	3
Centenary	11	11	.500	7.5	4
Southern Utah	11	13	.458	8.5	—
Valparaiso	9	14	.391	10	—
Chicago State	2	18	.100	15.5	—

== Tournament ==
Upper round 1
1	Oral Roberts	5
4	Centenary	4
3	Oakland	6
2	Western Illinois	9
Lower round 1
4	Centenary	5
3	Oakland	10

Upper final
1	Oral Roberts	21
2	Western Illinois	2
Lower final
2	Western Illinois	12
3	Oakland	5

Final
1	Oral Roberts	2
2	Western Illinois	1

=== Game-by-game results ===
Game	Winner	Score	Loser	Comment
1	(1) Oral Roberts	5–4	(4) Centenary	
2	(2) Western Illinois	9–6	(3) Oakland	
3	(3) Oakland	10–5	(4) Centenary	Centenary eliminated
4	(1) Oral Roberts	21–2	(2) Western Illinois	
5	(2) Western Illinois	12–5	(3) Oakland	Oakland eliminated
6	(1) Oral Roberts	2–1	(2) Western Illinois	Oral Roberts wins Mid-Con Championship

== All-Tournament Team ==
Name	School
Chris Ashman	Oral Roberts
Jimmy Baker	Centenary
Andy Bouchie	Oral Roberts
Kevin Carkeek	Oakland
Travis Check	Western Illinois
Kyle Crepeau	Oakland
Brendan Duffy	Oral Roberts
Brandon Fulenchek	Centenary
Daniel Greenwalt	Oral Roberts
Sean Jarrett	Oral Roberts
Rob Johnson	Western Illinois
Ryan Schmidgall	Western Illinois
John Paul Shore	Western Illinois
Pat Warfle	Oral Roberts

=== Tournament Most Valuable Player ===
Sean Jarrett of Oral Roberts was named Tournament MVP.
