= 2004 Mid-Continent Conference baseball tournament =

- Teams: 4
- Format: Double-elimination
- Finals site: Fair Grounds Field; Shreveport, Louisiana
- Champions: Oral Roberts (7th title)
- Winning coach: Rob Walton (1st title)
- MVP: Ricky Rivera (Oral Roberts)

2004 Mid-Continent Conference baseball standings
	Conf.				Overall
Team	W		L	PCT	W		L	PCT
No. 22 Oral Roberts ‍†‍‡‍^{y}	21	–	1	.955	50	–	11	.820
Western Illinois ‍‍‍	13	–	11	.542	29	–	36	.446
Centenary ‍‍‍	10	–	11	.476	23	–	31	.426
Southern Utah ‍‍‍	11	–	13	.458	19	–	30	.388
Valparaiso ‍‍‍	11	–	13	.458	20	–	34	.370
Oakland ‍‍‍	10	–	13	.435	20	–	34	.370
Chicago State ‍‍‍	5	–	19	.208	8	–	52	.133
‡ – Tournament champion y – Invited to the NCAA tournament As of June 30, 2004; Rankings from Collegiate Baseball

The 2004 Mid-Continent Conference Tournament took place from May 27 through 29. The top four regular season finishers from the regular season met in the double-elimination tournament held at Fair Grounds Field in Shreveport, Louisiana. Oral Roberts won the tournament for the seventh consecutive time.

== Format and seeding ==
The top four finishers advanced to the tournament.

Team	W	L	Pct.	GB	Seed
Oral Roberts	21	1	.955	—	1
Western Illinois	13	11	.542	9	2
Centenary	10	11	.476	10.5	3
Southern Utah	11	13	.458	11	4
Valparaiso	11	13	.458	11	—
Oakland	10	13	.435	11.5	—
Chicago State	5	19	.208	17	—

== Tournament ==
Upper round 1
1	Oral Roberts	28
4	Southern Utah	8
3	Centenary	3
2	Western Illinois	5
Lower round 1
4	Southern Utah	7
3	Centenary	4

Upper final
1	Oral Roberts	8
2	Western Illinois	5
Lower final
2	Western Illinois	5
4	Southern Utah	6

Final
1	Oral Roberts	12
4	Southern Utah	4

=== Game-by-game results ===
Game	Winner	Score	Loser	Comment
1	(1) Oral Roberts	28–8	(4) Southern Utah	
2	(2) Western Illinois	5–3	(3) Centenary Gentlemen baseball	
3	(4) Southern Utah	7–4	(3) Centenary Gentlemen baseball	Centenary eliminated
4	(1) Oral Roberts	8–5	(2) Western Illinois	
5	(4) Southern Utah	6–5	(2) Western Illinois	Western Illinois eliminated
6	(1) Oral Roberts	12–4	(4) Southern Utah	Oral Roberts wins Mid-Con Championship

== All-Tournament Team ==
Name	School
Justin Abbott	Southern Utah
Amos Burgess	Southern Utah
Corey Ferger	Western Illinois
Shelby Guest	Southern Utah
Brian Hanson	Oral Roberts
David Kiefer	Centenary
Josh Lex	Oral Roberts
Kyle Malan	Western Illinois
Taylor McIntyre	Oral Roberts
Grant Plumley	Oral Roberts
Ricky Rivera	Oral Roberts
Ryan Schmidgall	Western Illinois
Blake Schultz	Western Illinois
Ryan Zimmerman	Southern Utah

=== Tournament Most Valuable Player ===
Ricky Rivera of Oral Roberts was named Tournament MVP.
