= 2007 Mid-Continent Conference baseball tournament =

- Teams: 4
- Format: Double-elimination
- Finals site: Alfred D. Boyer Stadium; Macomb, Illinois
- Champions: Oral Roberts (10th title)
- Winning coach: Rob Walton (4th title)
- MVP: Chad Rothford (Oral Roberts)

2007 Mid-Continent Conference baseball standings
	Conf.				Overall
Team	W		L	PCT	W		L	PCT
Oral Roberts ‍†‍‡‍^{y}	19	–	1	.950	40	–	17	.702
Western Illinois ‍‍‍	11	–	9	.550	31	–	26	.544
Valparaiso ‍‍‍	10	–	10	.500	22	–	34	.393
Centenary ‍‍‍	9	–	11	.450	28	–	31	.475
Oakland ‍‍‍	5	–	15	.250	20	–	34	.370
Southern Utah (Note: Southern Utah vacated the results of their six conference wins in 2007.) ‍‍‍	0	–	14	.000	5	–	45	.100
‡ – Tournament champion y – Invited to the NCAA tournament Records above are after conference sanctions against Southern Utah. As of June 30, 2007; Rankings from Collegiate Baseball

The 2007 Mid-Continent Conference Tournament took place from May 24 through 26. The top four regular season finishers from the regular season met in the double-elimination tournament held at Alfred D. Boyer Stadium on the campus of Western Illinois University in Macomb, Illinois. Oral Roberts won the tournament for the tenth consecutive time.

== Format and seeding ==
The top four finishers advanced to the tournament. Southern Utah vacated six wins due to conference sanctions. The on-field results are included in the standings below, as the sanctions were imposed after seeding of the tournament.

Team	W	L	Pct.	GB	Seed
Oral Roberts	19	1	.950	—	1
Western Illinois	11	9	.550	8	2
Valparaiso	10	10	.500	9	3
Centenary	9	11	.450	10	4
Southern Utah	6	14	.300	13	—
Oakland	5	15	.250	14	—

== Tournament ==
Upper round 1
1	Oral Roberts	20
4	Centenary	0
3	Valparaiso	13
2	Western Illinois	10
Lower round 1
4	Centenary	9
2	Western Illinois	3

Upper final
1	Oral Roberts	4
3	Valparaiso	2
Lower final
3	Valparaiso	1
4	Centenary	6

Final
1	Oral Roberts	9
4	Centenary	1

=== Game-by-game results ===
Game	Winner	Score	Loser	Comment
1	(1) Oral Roberts	20–0	(4) Centenary	
2	(3) Valparaiso	13–10	(2) Western Illinois	
3	(4) Centenary	9–3	(2) Western Illinois	Western Illinois eliminated
4	(1) Oral Roberts	4–2	(3) Valparaiso	
5	(4) Centenary	6–1	(3) Valparaiso	Valparaiso eliminated
6	(1) Oral Roberts	9–1	(4) Centenary	Oral Roberts wins Mid-Con Championship

== All-Tournament Team ==
Name	School
Dallas Cawiezell	Valparaiso
Chance Chapman	Oral Roberts
Justin Darr	Centenary
Brendan Duffy	Oral Roberts
Jeremy Hefner	Oral Roberts
Cameron Penny	Centenary
Zach Rodeghero	Valparaiso
Chad Rothford	Oral Roberts
Nate Santiago	Centenary
Jeremy Sheehan	Centenary
Jerry Sullivan	Oral Roberts
Kyle Surprenant	Western Illinois
Pat Warfle	Oral Roberts
Adam Younger	Oral Roberts

=== Tournament Most Valuable Player ===
Chad Rothford of Oral Roberts was named Tournament MVP.
