= 2014 Summit League baseball tournament =

- Teams: 4
- Format: Double-elimination
- Finals site: Sioux Falls Stadium; Sioux Falls, SD
- Champions: North Dakota State (1st title)
- Winning coach: Tod Brown (1st title)
- MVP: Reed Pfannestein (North Dakota State)

2014 Summit League baseball standings
	Conf.				Overall
Team	W		L	PCT	W		L	PCT
Nebraska–Omaha ‍†‍‍	15	–	9	.625	31	–	20	.608
South Dakota State ‍‍‍	11	–	11	.500	28	–	29	.491
Western Illinois ‍‍‍	11	–	13	.458	21	–	32	.396
IPFW ‍‍‍	11	–	13	.458	19	–	36	.345
North Dakota State ‍‍‡‍^{y}	10	–	12	.455	25	–	24	.510
† – Conference champion ‡ – Tournament champion y – Invited to the NCAA tournament As of May 24, 2014; Rankings from Collegiate Baseball

The 2014 Summit League baseball tournament took place from May 22 through 24. The top four regular season finishers of the league's five teams met in the double-elimination tournament held at Sioux Falls Stadium in Sioux Falls, South Dakota hosted by South Dakota State. North Dakota State won its first tournament championship to earn The Summit League's automatic bid to the 2014 NCAA Division I baseball tournament.

== Seeding ==
The top four finishers from the regular season were seeded one through four based on conference winning percentage. The teams then played a double elimination tournament. Nebraska–Omaha was ineligible as it transitioned to Division I.

Team	W	L	Pct	GB	Seed
Nebraska–Omaha	15	9	.609	–	–
South Dakota State	11	11	.524	2	1
Western Illinois	11	13	.478	3	2
IPFW	11	13	.458	3.5	3
North Dakota State	10	12	.429	4	4

== Results ==
First round
1	South Dakota State	3
4	North Dakota State	4
2	Western Illinois	8
3	IPFW	7
Lower round 1
1	South Dakota State	6
3	IPFW	3

Semi-finals
4	North Dakota State	6
2	Western Illinois	1
Lower final
1	South Dakota State	2
2	Western Illinois	5

Finals
4	North Dakota State	9
2	Western Illinois	0

== All-Tournament Team ==
The following players were named to the All-Tournament Team.

Name	School
Nick Altavilla	North Dakota State
Tom Constand	Western Illinois
David Ernst	North Dakota State
Kristian Gayday	Fort Wayne
Tanner Glore	Western Illinois
Jon Hechtner	North Dakota State
Jameson Henning	Western Illinois
Chad Hodges	South Dakota State
Michael Leach	North Dakota State
Reed Pfannenstein	North Dakota State (MVP)
JJ Reimer	Western Illinois
Scott Splett	South Dakota State
Parker Trewin	North Dakota State
Evan VanSumeren	Fort Wayne

=== Most Valuable Player ===
Reed Pfannenstein was named Tournament Most Valuable Player. Pfannenstein was a pitcher for North Dakota State.
