= 2005 Mid-Continent Conference baseball tournament =

- Teams: 4
- Format: Double-elimination
- Finals site: J. L. Johnson Stadium; Tulsa, Oklahoma
- Champions: Oral Roberts (8th title)
- Winning coach: Rob Walton (2nd title)
- MVP: Michael Holliman (Oral Roberts)

2005 Mid-Continent Conference baseball standings
	Conf.				Overall
Team	W		L	PCT	W		L	PCT
Oral Roberts ‍†‍‡‍^{y}	22	–	2	.917	42	–	20	.677
Western Illinois ‍‍‍	14	–	10	.583	24	–	34	.414
Southern Utah ‍‍‍	12	–	10	.545	26	–	28	.481
Centenary ‍‍‍	12	–	12	.500	27	–	30	.474
Valparaiso ‍‍‍	10	–	12	.455	21	–	31	.404
Oakland ‍‍‍	9	–	15	.375	14	–	38	.269
Chicago State ‍‍‍	3	–	21	.125	6	–	50	.107
‡ – Tournament champion y – Invited to the NCAA tournament As of June 30, 2005; Rankings from Collegiate Baseball

The 2005 Mid-Continent Conference Tournament took place from May 26 through 28. The top four regular season finishers from the regular season met in the double-elimination tournament held at J. L. Johnson Stadium on the campus of Oral Roberts University in Tulsa, Oklahoma. Oral Roberts won the tournament for the eighth consecutive time.

== Format and seeding ==
The top four finishers advanced to the tournament.

Team	W	L	Pct.	GB	Seed
Oral Roberts	22	2	.917	—	1
Western Illinois	14	10	.583	8	2
Southern Utah	12	10	.545	9	3
Centenary	12	12	.500	10	4
Valparaiso	10	12	.455	11	—
Oakland	9	15	.375	13	—
Chicago State	3	21	.125	19	—

== Tournament ==
Upper round 1
1	Oral Roberts	6
4	Centenary	1
3	Southern Utah	6
2	Western Illinois	2
Lower round 1
4	Centenary	6
2	Western Illinois	5

Upper final
1	Oral Roberts	11
3	Southern Utah	2
Lower final
3	Southern Utah	3
4	Centenary	7

Final
1	Oral Roberts	9
4	Centenary	1

=== Game-by-game results ===
Game	Winner	Score	Loser	Comment
1	(1) Oral Roberts	6–1	(4) Centenary	
2	(3) Southern Utah	6–2	(2) Western Illinois	
3	(4) Centenary	6–5	(2) Western Illinois	Western Illinois eliminated
4	(1) Oral Roberts	11–2	(3) Southern Utah	
5	(4) Centenary	16–12 ^{10}	(3) Southern Utah	Southern Utah eliminated
6	(1) Oral Roberts	9–1	(4) Centenary	Oral Roberts wins Mid-Con Championship

== All-Tournament Team ==
Name	School
Brian Aguailar	Oral Roberts
J.C. Biagi	Centenary
Dennis Bigley	Oral Roberts
Brandon Fulenchek	Centenary
Michael Hollimon	Oral Roberts
Kasey Hubbard	Southern Utah
T.J. Kistner	Western Illinois
Bobby Mahon	Western Illinois
Taylor McIntyre	Oral Roberts
Kelly Minissale	Oral Roberts
Aaron Nelson	Southern Utah
Jeff Oliverson	Southern Utah
Tim Ryan	Centenary
Tim Torres	Oral Roberts

=== Tournament Most Valuable Player ===
Michael Holliman of Oral Roberts was named Tournament MVP.
