= 2003 Mid-Continent Conference baseball tournament =

- Teams: 4
- Format: Double-elimination
- Finals site: J. L. Johnson Stadium; Tulsa, Oklahoma
- Champions: Oral Roberts (6th title)
- Winning coach: Sunny Golloway (6th title)
- MVP: Dennis Bigley (Oral Roberts)

2003 Mid-Continent Conference baseball standings
	Conf.						Overall
Team	W		L		T	PCT	W		L		T	PCT
Oral Roberts ‍†‍‡‍^{y}	19	–	1	–	0	.950	41	–	20	–	0	.672
Southern Utah ‍‍‍	11	–	9	–	0	.550	21	–	29	–	0	.420
Western Illinois ‍‍‍	10	–	10	–	0	.500	25	–	38	–	0	.397
Valparaiso ‍‍‍	9	–	11	–	0	.450	22	–	33	–	1	.402
Oakland ‍‍‍	7	–	13	–	0	.350	20	–	34	–	0	.370
Chicago State ‍‍‍	4	–	16	–	0	.200	9	–	47	–	0	.161
‡ – Tournament champion y – Invited to the NCAA tournament As of June 30, 2003; Rankings from Collegiate Baseball

The 2003 Mid-Continent Conference Tournament took place from May 22 through 24. The top four regular season finishers from the regular season met in the double-elimination tournament held at J. L. Johnson Stadium on the campus of Oral Roberts University in Tulsa, Oklahoma. Oral Roberts won the tournament for the sixth consecutive time.

== Format and seeding ==
The top four finishers advanced to the tournament.

Team	W	L	Pct.	GB	Seed
Oral Roberts	19	1	.950	—	1
Southern Utah	11	9	.550	8	2
Western Illinois	10	10	.500	9	3
Valparaiso	9	11	.450	10	4
Oakland	7	13	.350	12	—
Chicago State	4	16	.200	15	—

== Tournament ==
Upper round 1
1	Oral Roberts	8
4	Valparaiso	0
3	Western Illinois	10
2	Southern Utah	11^{12}
Lower round 1
4	Valparaiso	6^{11}
3	Western Illinois	5

Upper final
1	Oral Roberts	6
2	Southern Utah	2
Lower final
2	Southern Utah	16^{10}
4	Valparaiso	12

Final
1	Oral Roberts	8
2	Southern Utah	1

=== Game-by-game results ===
Game	Winner	Score	Loser	Comment
1	(1) Oral Roberts	8–0	(4) Valparaiso	
2	(2) Southern Utah	11–10 ^{12}	(3) Western Illinois	
3	(4) Valparaiso	6–5 ^{11}	(3) Western Illinois	Western Illinois eliminated
4	(1) Oral Roberts	6–2	(2) Southern Utah	
5	(2) Southern Utah	16–12 ^{10}	(4) Valparaiso	Valparaiso eliminated
6	(1) Oral Roberts	8–2	(2) Southern Utah	Oral Roberts wins Mid-Con Championship

== All-Tournament Team ==
Name	School
Dennis Bigley	Oral Roberts
Marc Boggio	Valparaiso
Scott Campbell	Oral Roberts
David Castillo	Oral Roberts
Ryan DuVall	Southern Utah
Tom Ford	Southern Utah
Jason Gillins	Southern Utah
Nate Griffin	Oral Roberts
Josh Lex	Oral Roberts
Dallas Martin	Oral Roberts
Sean Peickert	Valparaiso
Justin Ramsey	Oral Roberts
Jake Reynolds	Southern Utah
Nick Simmons	Western Illinois

=== Tournament Most Valuable Player ===
Dennis Bigley of Oral Roberts was named Tournament MVP.
