= 2002 Mid-Continent Conference baseball tournament =

- Teams: 4
- Format: Double-elimination
- Finals site: J. L. Johnson Stadium; Tulsa, Oklahoma
- Champions: Oral Roberts (5th title)
- Winning coach: Sunny Golloway (5th title)
- MVP: Erick Donaldson (Oral Roberts)

2002 Mid-Continent Conference baseball standings
	Conf.						Overall
Team	W		L		T	PCT	W		L		T	PCT
Oral Roberts ‍†‍‡‍^{y}	16	–	2	–	0	.889	48	–	19	–	0	.716
Southern Utah ‍‍‍	11	–	7	–	0	.611	18	–	37	–	0	.327
Oakland ‍‍‍	9	–	8	–	0	.529	19	–	35	–	0	.352
Valparaiso ‍‍‍	7	–	9	–	0	.438	15	–	32	–	1	.323
Western Illinois ‍‍‍	6	–	9	–	0	.400	12	–	39	–	0	.235
Chicago State ‍‍‍	0	–	14	–	0	.000	5	–	36	–	0	.122
‡ – Tournament champion y – Invited to the NCAA tournament As of June 30, 2002; Rankings from Collegiate Baseball

The 2002 Mid-Continent Conference Tournament took place from May 23 through 25. The top four regular season finishers from the regular season met in the double-elimination tournament held at J. L. Johnson Stadium on the campus of Oral Roberts University in Tulsa, Oklahoma. Oral Roberts won the tournament for the fifth consecutive time.

== Format and seeding ==
The top four finishers advanced to the tournament.

Team	W	L	Pct.	GB	Seed
Oral Roberts	16	2	.889	—	1
Southern Utah	11	7	.611	5	2
Oakland	9	8	.529	6.5	3
Valparaiso	7	9	.438	8	4
Western Illinois	6	9	.400	8.5	—
Chicago State	0	14	.000	16	—

== Tournament ==
Upper round 1
1	Oral Roberts	8
4	Valparaiso	0
3	Oakland	8
2	Southern Utah	6
Lower round 1
4	Valparaiso	4
2	Southern Utah	10

Upper final
1	Oral Roberts	12
3	Oakland	3
Lower final
3	Oakland	6
2	Southern Utah	7

Final
1	Oral Roberts	7
2	Southern Utah	1

=== Game-by-game results ===
Game	Winner	Score	Loser	Comment
1	(1) Oral Roberts	8–0	(4) Valparaiso	
2	(3) Oakland	8–6	(2) Southern Utah	
3	(2) Southern Utah	10–4	(4) Valparaiso	Valparaiso eliminated
4	(1) Oral Roberts	12–3	(3) Oakland	
5	(2) Southern Utah	7–6	(3) Oakland	Oakland eliminated
6	(1) Oral Roberts	7–1	(2) Southern Utah	Oral Roberts wins Mid-Con Championship

== All-Tournament Team ==
Name	School
Doug Bernier	Oral Roberts
Dennis Bigley	Oral Roberts
Danny Boyle	Oral Roberts
David Castillo	Oral Roberts
Stockton Davis	Oral Roberts
Erick Donaldson	Oral Roberts
Ryan DuVall	Southern Utah
Ryan Freiburger	Oakland
Ty Herriott	Oakland
Chris Nelson	Southern Utah
Shane Perkins	Southern Utah
Jake Reynolds	Southern Utah
Peter Varon	Oakland
Rick White	Southern Utah

=== Tournament Most Valuable Player ===
Erick Donaldson of Oral Roberts was named Tournament MVP.
