= 1984 Association of Mid-Continent Universities baseball tournament =

- Teams: 7
- Format: Double-elimination
- Finals site: Chicago, Illinois
- Champions: Southwest Missouri State (1st title)
- Winning coach: Keith Guttin (1st title)

1984 Association of Mid-Continent Universities baseball standings
	Conf.						Overall
Team	W		L		T	PCT	W		L		T	PCT
Western Illinois ‍‍‍	0	–	0	–	0	–	28	–	8	–	1	.770
Eastern Illinois ‍‍‍	0	–	0	–	0	–	19	–	11	–	0	.633
Southwest Missouri State ‍‍‡‍	0	–	0	–	0	–	35	–	22	–	0	.614
Valparaiso ‍‍‍	0	–	0	–	0	–	26	–	20	–	1	.564
Northern Iowa ‍‍‍	0	–	0	–	0	–	12	–	18	–	0	.400
UIC ‍‍‍	0	–	0	–	0	–	19	–	35	–	0	.352
Cleveland State ‍‍‍	0	–	0	–	0	–	10	–	38	–	1	.214
‡ – Tournament champion As of 1984

The 1984 Association of Mid-Continent Universities Tournament took place from May 4 through 6. All regular season finishers of the league's seven teams met in the double-elimination tournament held in Chicago, Illinois. Southwest Missouri State won the tournament.

== Format and seeding ==
The first year of the conference did not have a round-robin regular season schedule. Teams were matched for the first round by a random draw, and then played a double-elimination tournament.

== Tournament ==
Upper round 1	Upper round 2	Upper final	Final
Northern Iowa	4
UIC	1
UIC	2^{15}
Western Illinois	1
Northern Iowa	8
Eastern Illinois	6
Valparaiso	10
Cleveland State	1
Valparaiso	1
Eastern Illinois	9
Eastern Illinois	5
Southwest Missouri State	3
Northern Iowa	2	0
Southwest Missouri State	7	17
Lower round 1	Lower round 2	Lower round 3	Lower final
UIC	2
Cleveland State	5	Southwest Missouri State	14	Eastern Illinois	0
Southwest Missouri State	11	Southwest Missouri State	6	Southwest Missouri State	1
Western Illinois	1
Valparaiso	7
Western Illinois	11

== All-Tournament Team ==
Name	School
Bruce Bax	Southwest Missouri State
Rick Clarkston	Southwest Missouri State
Loren Hackman	Northern Iowa
Danny Iseminger	Southwest Missouri State
Brian Jones	Eastern Illinois
Kevin Keister	Southwest Missouri State
Ken Kokar	Valparaiso
Terry McDevitt	Eastern Illinois
Scott Prince	Southwest Missouri State
Mike Snodgrass	Southwest Missouri State
Mike Stokes	Western Illinois
Bob Villasenor	UIC
