= 1988 Association of Mid-Continent Universities baseball tournament =

- Teams: 4
- Format: Double-elimination
- Finals site: Chicago
- Champions: Southwest Missouri State (5th title)
- Winning coach: Keith Guttin (5th title)
- MVP: Tony Floyd (Southwest Missouri State)

1988 Association of Mid-Continent Universities baseball standings
	Conf.						Overall
Team	W		L		T	PCT	W		L		T	PCT
Blue Division
Valparaiso ^{x}‍‍‍	6	–	5	–	0	.545	14	–	40	–	0	.259
UIC ‍‍‍	6	–	6	–	0	.500	27	–	29	–	0	.482
Cleveland State ‍‍‍	5	–	6	–	0	.455	16	–	32	–	0	.333
Gray Division
Southwest Missouri State ^{x}‍‍‡‍	12	–	0	–	0	1.000	41	–	17	–	0	.707
Eastern Illinois ‍‍‍	6	–	6	–	0	.500	27	–	23	–	0	.540
Western Illinois ‍‍‍	4	–	8	–	0	.333	17	–	19	–	1	.473
Northern Iowa ‍‍‍	2	–	10	–	0	.167	11	–	43	–	0	.204
‡ – Tournament champion As of June 30, 1988; Rankings from Collegiate Baseball

The 1988 Association of Mid-Continent Universities Tournament took place from May 13 through 16. The top 4 regular season finishers of the league's seven teams met in the double-elimination tournament held in Chicago, Illinois. Southwest Missouri State won the tournament for the fifth time, en route to winning the first six titles.

== Format and seeding ==
The top two teams from each division advanced to the tournament. The top seed from each division played the second seed from the opposite division in the second round.

Blue Division
Team	W	L	Pct.	GB	Seed
Valparaiso	6	5	.545	—	1B
UIC	6	6	.500	.5	2B
Cleveland State	5	6	.455	1	—

Gray Division
Team	W	L	Pct.	GB	Seed
Southwest Missouri State	12	0	1.000	—	1G
Eastern Illinois	6	6	.500	6	2G
Western Illinois	4	8	.333	8	—
Northern Iowa	2	10	.167	10	—

== Tournament ==
Upper round 1
1B	Valparaiso	0
2G	Eastern Illinois	1
1G	Southwest Missouri State	5
2B	UIC	1
Lower round 1
1B	Valparaiso	2
2B	UIC	3

Upper final
2G	Eastern Illinois	3
1G	Southwest Missouri State	4
Lower final
2G	Eastern Illinois	6
2B	UIC	4

Final
1G	Southwest Missouri State	5	9
2G	Eastern Illinois	15	2

== All-Tournament Team ==
Name	School
Dale Bowling	Southwest Missouri State
Mike DiBenedetto	Eastern Illinois
Tony Floyd	Southwest Missouri State
Dan Hargis	Eastern Illinois
Jeff Jetel	Eastern Illinois
Jeff Kaiser	Southwest Missouri State
Pat Kelly	Southwest Missouri State
Dana Leibovitz	Eastern Illinois
Dave McDevitt	Eastern Illinois
Mark Neff	Southwest Missouri State
Jim Phillos	UIC
Mike Ruble	Southwest Missouri State

=== Tournament Most Valuable Player ===
Tony Floyd of Southwest Missouri State was named Tournament MVP.
