= 1989 Association of Mid-Continent Universities baseball tournament =

- Teams: 4
- Format: Double-elimination
- Finals site: Chicago
- Champions: Southwest Missouri State (6th title)
- Winning coach: Keith Guttin (6th title)
- MVP: Earnie Johns (Southwest Missouri State)

1989 Association of Mid-Continent Universities baseball standings
	Conf.						Overall
Team	W		L		T	PCT	W		L		T	PCT
Blue Division
Cleveland State ^{x}‍‍‍	7	–	3	–	0	.700	24	–	21	–	0	.533
UIC ‍‍‍	5	–	4	–	0	.556	33	–	29	–	0	.532
Valparaiso ‍‍‍	3	–	8	–	0	.273	14	–	32	–	1	.309
Gray Division
Southwest Missouri State ^{x}‍‍‡‍	8	–	2	–	0	.800	41	–	10	–	0	.804
Eastern Illinois ‍‍‍	6	–	2	–	0	.750	31	–	19	–	0	.620
Western Illinois ‍‍‍	3	–	7	–	0	.300	20	–	18	–	0	.526
Northern Iowa ‍‍‍	1	–	7	–	0	.125	13	–	37	–	0	.260
‡ – Tournament champion As of June 30, 1989; Rankings from Collegiate Baseball

The 1989 Association of Mid-Continent Universities Tournament took place from May 12 through 14. The top 4 regular season finishers of the league's seven teams met in the double-elimination tournament held in Chicago, Illinois. Southwest Missouri State won the tournament for the sixth time. The Bears would leave the conference after the 1990 season, the first time they did not win the Tournament.

== Format and seeding ==
The top two teams from each division advanced to the tournament. The top seed from each division played the second seed from the opposite division in the second round.

Blue Division
Team	W	L	Pct.	GB	Seed
Cleveland State	7	3	.700	—	1B
UIC	5	4	.556	1.5	2B
Valparaiso	3	8	.273	4.5	—

Gray Division
Team	W	L	Pct.	GB	Seed
Southwest Missouri State	8	2	.800	—	1G
Eastern Illinois	6	2	.750	1	2G
Western Illinois	3	7	.300	5	—
Northern Iowa	1	7	.125	6	—

== Tournament ==
Upper round 1
1B	Cleveland State	3
2G	Eastern Illinois	2
1G	Southwest Missouri State	1
2B	UIC	0
Lower round 1
2G	Eastern Illinois	12
2B	UIC	6

Upper final
1B	Cleveland State	3
1G	Southwest Missouri State	6
Lower final
1B	Cleveland State	3
2G	Eastern Illinois	4^{10}

Final
1G	Southwest Missouri State	4	5
2G	Eastern Illinois	6	1

== All-Tournament Team ==
Name	School
Scott Asche	Cleveland State
Dale Bowling	Southwest Missouri State
Dan Briese	Eastern Illinois
Jim Clinton	UIC
Jim Cseh	Cleveland State
Corby Fister	Southwest Missouri State
Dan Hargis	Eastern Illinois
Earnie Johnson	Southwest Missouri State
Matt Legaspi	Eastern Illinois
Dana Leibovitz	Eastern Illinois
Ken O’Rell	Cleveland State
Jim Phillos	UIC
Julius Smith	Eastern Illinois
Chris Steil	Eastern Illinois

=== Tournament Most Valuable Player ===
Earnie Johns of Southwest Missouri State was named Tournament MVP.
