= 1987 Association of Mid-Continent Universities baseball tournament =

- Teams: 4
- Format: Double-elimination
- Finals site: Chicago
- Champions: Southwest Missouri State (4th title)
- Winning coach: Keith Guttin (4th title)
- MVP: Larry Doss (Southwest Missouri State)

1987 Association of Mid-Continent Universities baseball standings
	Conf.						Overall
Team	W		L		T	PCT	W		L		T	PCT
Blue Division
Valparaiso ^{x}‍‍‍	8	–	4	–	0	.667	31	–	23	–	2	.571
Cleveland State ‍‍‍	5	–	5	–	0	.500	20	–	17	–	2	.538
UIC ‍‍‍	3	–	7	–	0	.300	23	–	27	–	0	.460
Gray Division
Eastern Illinois ^{x}‍‍‍	9	–	3	–	0	.750	31	–	22	–	1	.583
Southwest Missouri State ‍‍‡‍^{y}	7	–	3	–	0	.700	38	–	14	–	0	.731
Western Illinois ‍‍‍	3	–	7	–	0	.300	20	–	18	–	0	.526
Northern Iowa ‍‍‍	3	–	9	–	0	.250	26	–	21	–	0	.553
‡ – Tournament champion y – Invited to the NCAA tournament As of June 30, 1987; Rankings from Collegiate Baseball

The 1987 Association of Mid-Continent Universities Tournament took place from May 8 through 10. The top 4 regular season finishers of the league's seven teams met in the double-elimination tournament held in Chicago, Illinois. Southwest Missouri State won the tournament for the fourth time, en route to winning the first six titles.

== Format and seeding ==
The top two teams from each division advanced to the tournament. The top seed from each division played the second seed from the opposite division in the second round.

Blue Division
Team	W	L	Pct.	GB	Seed
Valparaiso	8	4	.667	—	1B
Cleveland State	5	5	.500	2	2B
UIC	3	7	.300	4	—

Gray Division
Team	W	L	Pct.	GB	Seed
Eastern Illinois	9	3	.750	—	1G
Southwest Missouri State	7	3	.700	1	2G
Western Illinois	3	7	.300	5	—
Northern Iowa	3	9	.250	6	—

== Tournament ==
Upper round 1
1B	Valparaiso	2
2G	Southwest Missouri State	4
1G	Eastern Illinois	6
2B	Cleveland State	3
Lower round 1
1B	Valparaiso	5
2B	Cleveland State	6

Upper final
2G	Southwest Missouri State	22
1G	Eastern Illinois	11
Lower final
1G	Eastern Illinois	18
2B	Cleveland State	11

Final
2G	Southwest Missouri State	10^{13}	—
1G	Eastern Illinois	9	—

== All-Tournament Team ==
Name	School
Tim Bogar	Eastern Illinois
Shannon Coppell	Eastern Illinois
Larry Doss	Southwest Missouri State
Jim Gibbs	Southwest Missouri State
Dan Hickman	Southwest Missouri State
Al Kieboom	Eastern Illinois
Kevin Miller	Cleveland State
Mike Rooney	Eastern Illinois
Stan Royer	Eastern Illinois
Al Stacey	Cleveland State

=== Tournament Most Valuable Player ===
Larry Doss of Southwest Missouri State was named Tournament MVP.
