= List of professional sports teams in South Dakota =

South Dakota is the 46th most populated state in the United States and has a rich history of professional sports.

== Active teams ==
Baseball
League	Team	City	Stadium	Capacity
AAPB (Ind.)	Sioux Falls Canaries	Sioux Falls	Sioux Falls Stadium	5,462
Basketball
League	Team	City	Arena	Capacity
G-League	Sioux Falls Skyforce	Sioux Falls	Sanford Pentagon	3,250
Ice hockey
League	Team	City	Arena	Capacity
ECHL	Rapid City Rush	Rapid City	The Monument	7,500

=== Map of cities with a professional sports team ===
Location with a professional sports team

== See also ==
- Sports in South Dakota
