= 1986 Association of Mid-Continent Universities baseball tournament =

- Teams: 4
- Format: Double-elimination
- Finals site: Chicago
- Champions: Southwest Missouri State (3rd title)
- Winning coach: Keith Guttin (3rd title)
- MVP: Steve Jeffers (Western Illinois)

1986 Association of Mid-Continent Universities baseball standings
	Conf.						Overall
Team	W		L		T	PCT	W		L		T	PCT
Blue Division
Cleveland State ^{x}‍‍‍	7	–	4	–	0	.636	23	–	24	–	0	.489
UIC ‍‍‍	6	–	6	–	0	.500	26	–	26	–	0	.500
Valparaiso ‍‍‍	4	–	7	–	0	.364	22	–	25	–	1	.469
Gray Division
Southwest Missouri State ^{x}‍‍‡‍	11	–	1	–	0	.917	47	–	14	–	0	.770
Western Illinois ‍‍‍	6	–	6	–	0	.500	19	–	22	–	0	.463
Eastern Illinois ‍‍‍	4	–	7	–	0	.364	29	–	22	–	1	.567
Northern Iowa ‍‍‍	2	–	9	–	0	.182	25	–	18	–	1	.580
‡ – Tournament champion As of June 30, 1986; Rankings from Collegiate Baseball

The 1986 Association of Mid-Continent Universities Tournament took place from May 9 through 11. The top 4 regular season finishers of the league's seven teams met in the double-elimination tournament held in Chicago, Illinois. Southwest Missouri State won the tournament for the third time, en route to winning the first six titles.

== Format and seeding ==
The top two teams from each division advanced to the tournament. The top seed from each division played the second seed from the opposite division in the second round.

Blue Division
Team	W	L	Pct.	GB	Seed
Cleveland State	7	4	.636	—	1B
UIC	6	6	.500	1.5	2B
Valparaiso	4	7	.364	3	—

Gray Division
Team	W	L	Pct.	GB	Seed
Southwest Missouri State	11	1	.917	—	1G
Western Illinois	6	6	.500	5	2G
Eastern Illinois	4	7	.583	3	—
Northern Iowa	2	9	.182	8.5	—

== Tournament ==
Upper round 1
1B	Cleveland State	3
2G	Western Illinois	4^{10}
1G	Southwest Missouri State	3
2B	UIC	0
Lower round 1
1B	Cleveland State	6
2B	UIC	10

Upper final
2G	Western Illinois	4
1G	Southwest Missouri State	9
Lower final
2G	Western Illinois	14
2B	UIC	3

Final
1G	Southwest Missouri State	8	—
2G	Western Illinois	7	—

== All-Tournament Team ==
Name	School
Howard Bell	Southwest Missouri State
Greg Brewer	Southwest Missouri State
Stacey Burkey	Southwest Missouri State
Pat Hise	Western Illinois
Chris Howard	Western Illinois
Steve Jeffers	Western Illinois
Scott Metz	UIC
Steve Meyer	Southwest Missouri State
Mike Mohr	Western Illinois
Matt Nowak	Southwest Missouri State
Stan Scott	Western Illinois

=== Tournament Most Valuable Player ===
Steve Jeffers of Western Illinois was named Tournament MVP.
