= 2026 Summit League baseball tournament =

College baseball tournament

- Teams: 4
- Format: Double-elimination
- Finals site: Siebert Field; Minneapolis, Minnesota
- Champions: South Dakota State (2nd title)
- Runner-up: Oral Roberts
- Winning coach: Rob Bishop (1st title)
- MVP: Ty Madison (South Dakota State)
- Attendance: 535 (total); 178 (finals)
- Television: Summit League Network

2026 Summit League baseball standings
	Conf.				Overall
Team	W		L	PCT	W		L	PCT
Oral Roberts ‍†‍‍	22	–	6	.786	35	–	24	.593
Omaha ‍‍‍	16	–	11	.593	21	–	26	.447
Northern Colorado ‍‍‍	13	–	15	.464	17	–	38	.309
South Dakota State ‍‍‡‍^{y}	12	–	15	.444	24	–	31	.436
North Dakota State ‍‍‍	9	–	16	.360	13	–	32	.289
St. Thomas ‍‍‍	9	–	18	.333	12	–	38	.240
† – Conference champion ‡ – Tournament champion y – Invited to the NCAA Tournament; As of May 23, 2026; Rankings from D1Baseball

The 2026 Summit League baseball tournament took place from May 20 through 23, 2026. The top four out of six teams in the conference's regular season met in the double-elimination tournament held at Siebert Field on the campus of the University of Minnesota in Minneapolis, Minnesota. St. Thomas was the league host of the tournament, but elected to host this and the softball tournament at the University of Minnesota. South Dakota State won the tournament and received the Summit League's automatic bid to the 2026 NCAA Division I baseball tournament.

== Standings and seeding ==
The top four teams from the regular season were seeded one through four based on conference winning percentage during the double round-robin regular season. The teams then played a double-elimination tournament.

Place	Seed	Team	Conference			Overall		
Place	Seed	Team	W	L	%	W	L	%
1	1	Oral Roberts	22	6	.786	32	22	.593
2	2	Omaha	16	11	.593	21	24	.467
3	3	Northern Colorado	13	15	.464	16	36	.308
4	4	South Dakota State	12	15	.444	21	30	.412
5		North Dakota State	9	16	.360	13	32	.289
6		St. Thomas	9	18	.333	12	38	.240

== Results ==
First round May 20/21; MidcoSN/SLN
1	Oral Roberts	3
4	South Dakota State	7
2	Omaha	3
3	Northern Colorado	5
Lower round 1
1	Oral Roberts	9
2	Omaha	0

Semi-finals; May 21/22; MidcoSN/SLN
4	South Dakota State	2
3	Northern Colorado	1
Lower final
1	Oral Roberts	3
3	Northern Colorado	1

Finals; May 23; MidcoSN/SLN
4	South Dakota State	1	9
1	Oral Roberts	4	6

== All–Tournament Team ==
The following players were named to the All–Tournament Team:

Player	School
Ty Madison (MVP)	South Dakota State
Luke Jones	South Dakota State
Kaden Rylance	South Dakota State
Owen Siegert	South Dakota State
Nate Wachter	South Dakota State
Nic Werk	South Dakota State
Will Edmundson	Oral Roberts
Jackson Farrell	Oral Roberts
Nathan Love	Oral Roberts
Matthew Mainord	Oral Roberts
Makani Tanaka	Oral Roberts
Ethan Mooser	Northern Colorado
Reece Wagner	Northern Colorado
Jackson Trout	Omaha
