= 1990 Mid-Continent Conference baseball tournament =

- Teams: 4
- Format: Double-elimination
- Finals site: Chicago
- Champions: UIC (1st title)
- Winning coach: Dean Refakes (1st title)
- MVP: Kevin Walker (Southwest Missouri State)

1990 Mid-Continent Conference baseball standings
	Conf.				Overall
Team	W		L	PCT	W		L	PCT
Blue Division
UIC ^{x}‍‍‡‍	8	–	3	.727	33	–	24	.579
Akron ‍‍‍	7	–	5	.583	25	–	29	.463
Cleveland State ‍‍‍	3	–	6	.333	13	–	27	.325
Valparaiso ‍‍‍	3	–	7	.300	20	–	35	.364
Gray Division
Southwest Missouri State ^{x}‍‍‍	11	–	0	1.000	42	–	15	.737
Eastern Illinois ‍‍‍	4	–	7	.364	24	–	30	.444
Western Illinois ‍‍‍	4	–	8	.333	19	–	20	.487
Northern Iowa ‍‍‍	4	–	8	.333	20	–	39	.339
‡ – Tournament champion As of June 30, 1990; Rankings from Collegiate Baseball

The 1990 Mid-Continent Conference Tournament took place from May 11 through 14. The top 4 regular season finishers of the league's eight teams met in the double-elimination tournament held in Chicago, Illinois. UIC won the tournament for the first time.

== Format and seeding ==
The top two teams from each division advanced to the tournament. The top seed from each division played the second seed from the opposite division in the second round.

Blue Division
Team	W	L	Pct.	GB	Seed
UIC	8	3	.727	—	1B
Akron	7	5	.583	1.5	2B
Cleveland State	3	6	.333	4	—
Valparaiso	3	7	.300	4.5	—

Gray Division
Team	W	L	Pct.	GB	Seed
Southwest Missouri State	11	0	1.000	—	1G
Eastern Illinois	4	7	.364	7	2G
Western Illinois	4	8	.333	7.5	—
Northern Iowa	4	8	.333	7.5	—

== Tournament ==
Upper round 1
1B	UIC	5
2G	Eastern Illinois	2
1G	Southwest Missouri State	5^{12}
2B	Akron	4
Lower round 1
2G	Eastern Illinois	8
2B	Akron	1

Upper final
1B	UIC	5^{13}
1G	Southwest Missouri State	4
Lower final
1G	Southwest Missouri State	9
2G	Eastern Illinois	2

Final
1B	UIC	4	—
1G	Southwest Missouri State	0	—

== All-Tournament Team ==
Name	School
Brent Bartlett	Southwest Missouri State
Brett Davis	UIC
Greg Faron	Southwest Missouri State
Corby Fister	Southwest Missouri State
Steve Hall	UIC
Jeff Jetel	Eastern Illinois
Cory Krueger	Southwest Missouri State
John Mallee	UIC
Jeff Nelson	Eastern Illinois
Jim Phillos	UIC
Jeff Rollyson	Akron
Kevin Walker	UIC

=== Tournament Most Valuable Player ===
Kevin Walker of UIC was named Tournament MVP.
