= 1991 Mid-Continent Conference baseball tournament =

- Teams: 6
- Format: Double-elimination
- Finals site: Chicago
- Champions: Akron (1st title)
- Winning coach: Dave Fross (1st title)
- MVP: Larry Rubin (UIC)

1991 Mid-Continent Conference baseball standings
	Conf.						Overall
Team	W		L		T	PCT	W		L		T	PCT
Blue Division
Akron ^{x}‍‍‡‍	12	–	5	–	0	.706	38	–	21	–	1	.642
UIC ‍‍‍	11	–	6	–	0	.647	25	–	30	–	0	.455
Valparaiso ‍‍‍	7	–	8	–	0	.467	20	–	39	–	2	.344
Cleveland State ‍‍‍	2	–	10	–	0	.167	19	–	22	–	0	.463
Gray Division
Eastern Illinois ^{x}‍‍‍	9	–	2	–	0	.818	27	–	32	–	0	.458
Western Illinois ‍‍‍	5	–	5	–	0	.500	21	–	23	–	0	.477
Northern Iowa ‍‍‍	1	–	9	–	0	.100	13	–	44	–	0	.228
‡ – Tournament champion As of June 30, 1991; Rankings from Collegiate Baseball

The 1991 Mid-Continent Conference Tournament took place from May 10 through 13. The top 4 regular season finishers of the league's seven teams met in the double-elimination tournament held in Chicago, Illinois. Akron won the tournament for the first and only time.

== Format and seeding ==
The top three teams from each division advanced to the tournament. With four teams in the Blue Division, only Cleveland State did not participate.

Blue Division
Team	W	L	Pct.	GB	Seed
Akron	12	5	.706	—	1B
UIC	11	6	.647	1	2B
Valparaiso	7	8	.467	4	3B
Cleveland State	2	10	.167	7.5	—

Gray Division
Team	W	L	Pct.	GB	Seed
Eastern Illinois	9	2	.818	—	1G
Western Illinois	5	5	.500	3.5	2G
Northern Iowa	1	9	.100	7.5	3G

== Tournament ==
Bracket to be included

=== Game-by-game results ===
Game	Winner	Score	Loser	Comment
1	(1B) Akron	4–0	(2G) Western Illinois	
2	(2B) UIC	12–6	(3G) Northern Iowa	
3	(1G) Eastern Illinois	11–7	(3B) Valparaiso	
4	(2G) Western Illinois	12–4	(3G) Northern Iowa	Northern Iowa eliminated
5	(1B) Akron	3–2	(1G) Eastern Illinois	
6	(3B) Valparaiso	12–11	(2B) UIC	
7	(2G) Western Illinois	11–2	(3B) Valparaiso	Valparaiso eliminated
8	(2B) UIC	11–7	(1G) Eastern Illinois	Eastern Illinois eliminated
9	(1B) Akron	6–5	(2G) Western Illinois	Western Illinois eliminated
10	2B UIC	6–5	(1B) Akron	
11	1B Akron	10–9	(2B) UIC	Akron wins Mid-Con Championship

== All-Tournament Team ==
Name	School
Bob Bortz	Valparaiso
Steve Hall	Akron
Mike Kimler	Akron
Adam Kocik	Akron
Kelly Kropp	UIC
R.C. Lichtenstein	UIC
John Mallee	UIC
Ken Manning	Valparaiso
Steve Muller	Valparaiso
Ron Nuñez	Western Illinois
Brad Owens	Western Illinois
Larry Rubin	UIC

=== Tournament Most Valuable Player ===
Larry Rubin of UIC was named Tournament MVP.
