= Shreveport-Bossier Captains =

Shreveport–Bossier Captains
Logo
Cap insignia

Information
- League: American Association (2006–11) (South Division)
- Location: Shreveport, Louisiana
- Ballpark: Fair Grounds Field
- Founded: 2003
- Nickname: The Captains
- League championships: 2010
- Division championships: 2004, 2006, 2010
- Former name: Shreveport–Bossier Captains (2009–11); Shreveport Sports (2003–08)
- Former league: Central Baseball League (2003–05)
- Colors: Cardinal, black, silver, white, tan, beige
- Ownership: Scott Berry & Gary Elliston
- Media: Shreveport Times

The Shreveport–Bossier Captains were a professional baseball team based in Shreveport, Louisiana, in the United States. Following the 2011 season, the team was sold to new ownership and moved to Laredo, Texas, to continue play as the Laredo Lemurs. The Captains were a member of the South Division of the American Association of Independent Professional Baseball, which was not affiliated with Major League Baseball at the time. From the 2003 season to the 2011 season, the Captains played their home games at Shreveport's Fair Grounds Field.

The latest incarnation of the Captains was founded in 2003 as the Shreveport–Bossier Sports, after the Class-AA Texas League Shreveport Swamp Dragons moved to Frisco, Texas, to become the RoughRiders. On January 8, 2009, the Captains unveiled their new name (themed as a pirate captain rather than a tribute to Captain Henry Miller Shreve, the founder of Shreveport), logo, and color scheme; unlike prior teams, this incarnation of the Captains also encompasses neighboring Bossier City in its locale name.

After the 2010 season, the Captains' owners were awarded an American Association team to be based in Amarillo to replace a United League Baseball team. At first it was assumed the Captains would be relocating to Amarillo. However, the Pensacola Pelicans' owners later purchased the Carolina Mudcats and folded the American Association incarnation of the team for the 2011 season so that the Mudcats could relocate to Pensacola for the 2012 baseball season. This move was expected to keep the Captains in Shreveport and in the American Association for the foreseeable future. However, the Shreveport–Bossier Captains announced on November 29, 2011, that the team had been sold to a new ownership group and would move. The team was purchased by Laredo Baseball Investors, LLC.

== History of Shreveport baseball ==
Professional baseball has been in Shreveport at various levels since 1895, including several teams named the Shreveport Sports and one prior team named the Shreveport Captains:

- 1895 — Shreveport Grays (Texas-Southern League)
- 1901–1903 — Shreveport Giants (Southern Association)
- 1904–1907 — Shreveport Pirates (Southern Association)
- 1908–1910 — Shreveport Pirates (Texas League)
- 1915–1924 — Shreveport Gassers (Texas League)
- 1925–1932 — Shreveport Sports (Texas League)
- 1933 — Shreveport Sports (Dixie League)
- 1934 — Shreveport Sports (East Dixie League)
- 1935 — Shreveport Sports (West Dixie League)
- 1938–1942 — Shreveport Sports (Texas League)
- 1946–1957 — Shreveport Sports (Texas League)
- 1959–1961 — Shreveport Sports (Southern Association)
- 1968–1970 — Shreveport Braves (Texas League)
- 1971–2000 — Shreveport Captains (Texas League)
- 2001–2002 — Shreveport Swamp Dragons (Texas League)
- 2003–2005 — Shreveport Sports (Central League)
- 2006–2008 — Shreveport Sports (American Association)
- 2009–2011 — Shreveport–Bossier Captains (American Association)

=== Major leaguers who played in a Shreveport uniform ===
- Tony Peña (Pirates, Cardinals, Red Sox, Indians, White Sox, and Astros) (Baseball Hall of Fame inductee)-----(Captains)
- Mike Aldrete (SF Giants, Montreal Expos, SD Padres, CLE Indians, Oakland Athletics, CA Angels, NY Yankees)-----(Captains)
- Marvin Benard (SF Giants)-----(Captains)
- Pedro Feliz (SF Giants)-----(Captains)
- Randall Johnson (Engine 12 C) ----(SwampDragons)
- Royce Clayton (SF Giants, STL Cardinals, TX Rangers, CHI White Sox, Milwaukee Brewers, CO Rockies, AZ Diamondbacks, WA Nationals)-----(Captains)
- Russ Ortiz (Giants, Braves, Diamondbacks, Orioles)-----(Captains)
- Yorvit Torrealba (Giants, Rockies, Mariners)-----(Captains)
- Chili Davis (Giants, Angels, Yankees, Twins, Royals)-----(Captains)
- Bill Mueller (Giants, Cubs, Red Sox, Dodgers)-----(Captains)
- Doug Mirabelli (Giants, Red Sox, Rangers, Padres)-----(Captains)
- George Sisler (Browns, Braves) (Baseball Hall of Fame inductee)-----(Sports)
- Al Simmons (Philadelphia A's, White Sox, Senators) (Baseball Hall of Fame inductee)-----(Gassers)
- Zack Wheat (Brooklyn Dodgers, Philadelphia A's) (Baseball Hall of Fame inductee)-----(Sports)
- Bill Terry (New York Giants) (Baseball Hall of Fame inductee)-----(Sports)
- Dusty Baker (Braves, Dodgers, A's)-----(Shreveport Braves)
- Ralph Garr (Braves, White Sox, Angels)-----(Shreveport Braves)
- Tom O'Malley (Giants, Mets, Orioles, Rangers)-----(Captains)
- Rick Honeycutt (Mariners, Dodgers, A's, Rangers, Cardinals)-----(Captains)
- Sixto Lezcano (Brewers, Padres, Phillies, Cardinals)-----(Captains)
- Ramón Martínez (Giants, Cubs, Tigers, Phillies, Dodgers)-----(Captains)
- Calvin Murray (Giants, Rangers, Cubs)-----(Captains)
- Aaron Fultz (Giants, Rangers, Twins, Phillies)-----(Captains)
- Chris Singleton (White Sox, Orioles, A's, Devil Rays)-----(Captains)
- Rich Aurilia (Giants, Mariners, Reds)-----(Captains)
- Jay Canizaro (Giants, Twins)-----(Captains)
- Keith Foulke (Giants, White Sox, Red Sox)-----(Captains)
- Dennis Cook (Giants, Indians, Mets, Angels)-----(Captains)
- Damon Minor (SF Giants)-----(Captains)
- Joe Nathan (Giants, Twins, Rangers)-----(Captains, Swamp Dragons)
- Lance Niekro (SF Giants)-----(Swamp Dragons)
- Jesse Foppert (SF Giants)-----(Swamp Dragons)
- Scott Linebrink (Giants, Astros, Padres, Brewers, White Sox, Braves)-----(Captains)
- John Burkett (SF Giants, Texas Rangers, Atlanta Braves, Boston Red Sox)-----(Captains)
- Jeff Brantley (SF Giants, Reds, Cardinals, Philies, Rangers)-----(Captains)
- Joey Gathright (Devil Rays, Royals, Cubs, Red Sox)-----(Captains)
- Nate Bump (Marlins)-----(Captains)

== Championships ==
- 1919 Texas League Championship (Gassers)
- 1942 Texas League Championship (Sports)
- 1952 Texas League Championship (Sports)
- 1955 Texas League Championship (Sports)
- 1990 Texas League Championship (Captains)
- 1991 Texas League Championship (Captains)
- 1995 Texas League Championship (Captains)
- 2010 American Association Championship (Captains)

== Ballparks ==
- Gasser Park 1915–1924
- Biedenharn Park 1925–1932
- Texas League Park 1938–1942, 1946–1957
- Bonneau Peters Field 1968
- Braves Field 1968–1970
- SPAR Stadium 1971–1985
- Fair Grounds Field 1986–2011

== Major league affiliation ==
- 1923–1924: Philadelphia A's
- 1939, 1942, 1946: Chicago White Sox
- 1968–1970: Atlanta Braves
- 1971–1972: California Angels
- 1973–1974: Milwaukee Brewers
- 1975–1978: Pittsburgh Pirates
- 1979–2002: San Francisco Giants

== Year-by-year results (bold denotes a postseason appearance) ==
- 2011 Shreveport–Bossier Captains 45 55 .450
- **2010 Shreveport–Bossier Captains 58 37 .611**
- 2009 Shreveport–Bossier Captains 48 48 .500
- 2008 Shreveport Sports 26 68 .277
- 2007 Shreveport Sports 47 48 .495
- **2006 Shreveport Sports 54 39 .581**
- 2005 Shreveport Sports 46 48 .489
- **2004 Shreveport Sports 50 45 .526**
- 2003 Shreveport Sports 51 44 .537
- 2002 Shreveport Swamp Dragons 60 79 .432
- 2001 Shreveport Swamp Dragons 54 81 .400
- **2000 Shreveport Captains 58 81 .417**
- **1999 Shreveport Captains 71 69 .507**
- 1998 Shreveport Captains 57 83 .407
- **1997 Shreveport Captains 76 62 .551** (Lost in TL Finals)
- 1996 Shreveport Captains 73 66 .525
- **1995 Shreveport Captains 88 47 .652**
- **1994 Shreveport Captains 73 63 .537**
- **1993 Shreveport Captains 66 70 .485**
- **1992 Shreveport Captains 77 59 .566** (Lost in TL Finals)
- **1991 Shreveport Captains 86 50 .632**
- **1990 Shreveport Captains 65 68 .489**
- **1989 Shreveport Captains 75 61 .551**
- **1988 Shreveport Captains 74 62 .544**
- **1987 Shreveport Captains 78 57 .578**
- **1986 Shreveport Captains 80 56 .588**
- 1985 Shreveport Captains 72 64 .529
- 1984 Shreveport Captains 59 77 .434
- 1983 Shreveport Captains 72 64 .529
- 1982 Shreveport Captains 62 73 .459
- 1981 Shreveport Captains 68 67 .504
- 1980 Shreveport Captains 49 87 .360
- **1979 Shreveport Captains 73 62 .541**
- 1978 Shreveport Captains 55 81 .404
- 1977 Shreveport Captains 62 68 .477
- **1976 Shreveport Captains 70 66 .515** (Lost in TL Finals)
- 1975 Shreveport Captains 76 52 .594
- 1974 Shreveport Captains 59 79 .428
- 1973 Shreveport Captains 70 68 .507
- 1972 Shreveport Captains 64 76 .457
- 1971 Shreveport Captains 69 73 .486
