= 1993 Mid-Continent Conference baseball tournament =

- Teams: 6
- Format: Double-elimination
- Finals site: Chicago
- Champions: UIC (2nd title)
- Winning coach: Dean Refakes (2nd title)
- MVP: Jody Brown (UIC)

1993 Mid-Continent Conference baseball standings
	Conf.						Overall
Team	W		L		T	PCT	W		L		T	PCT
Wright State ‍†‍‍	17	–	3	–	0	.850	39	–	15	–	0	.722
UIC ‍‍‡‍	13	–	8	–	0	.619	31	–	26	–	0	.544
Eastern Illinois ‍‍‍	9	–	6	–	1	.594	23	–	23	–	1	.500
Cleveland State ‍‍‍	10	–	10	–	0	.500	23	–	26	–	0	.469
Valparaiso ‍‍‍	8	–	12	–	0	.400	12	–	39	–	1	.240
Western Illinois ‍‍‍	7	–	12	–	1	.375	12	–	28	–	1	.305
Northern Illinois ‍‍‍	6	–	13	–	0	.316	16	–	34	–	1	.324
Youngstown State ‍‍‍	5	–	11	–	0	.313	20	–	26	–	0	.435
Milwaukee ‍‍‍	0	–	0	–	0	–	10	–	19	–	0	.345
‡ – Tournament champion As of June 30, 1993; Rankings from Collegiate Baseball

The 1993 Mid-Continent Conference baseball tournament took place from May 20 through 23. The top six regular season finishers of the league's nine teams met in the double-elimination tournament held in Chicago, Illinois. UIC won the tournament for the second time.

== Format and seeding ==
The top six teams advanced to the tournament.

Team	W	L	T	Pct.	GB	Seed
Wright State	17	3	0	.850	—	1
UIC	13	8	0	.619	4.5	2
Eastern Illinois	9	6	1	.594	6	3
Cleveland State	10	10	0	.500	7	4
Valparaiso	8	12	0	.400	9	5
Western Illinois	7	12	1	.375	10	6
Northern Illinois	6	13	0	.316	10.5	—
Youngstown State	5	11	0	.313	10	—
Milwaukee	0	0	0	.000	—	—

== Tournament ==
Bracket to be included

=== Game-by-game results ===
Game	Winner	Score	Loser	Comment
1	(1) Wright State	6–3	(6) Western Illinois	
2	(2) UIC	12–5	(5) Valparaiso	
3	(3) Eastern Illinois	11–10	(4) Cleveland State	
4	(5) Valparaiso	6–5	(6) Western Illinois	Western Illinois eliminated
5	(4) Cleveland State	10–7	(1) Wright State	
6	(2) UIC	5–4	(3) Eastern Illinois	
7	(1) Wright State	5–3	(3) Eastern Illinois	Eastern Illinois eliminated
8	(4) Cleveland State	18–2	(5) Valparaiso	Valparaiso eliminated
9	(2) UIC	12–9	(1) Wright State	Wright State eliminated
10	(2) UIC	13–12	(4) Cleveland State	UIC wins Mid-Con Championship

== All-Tournament Team ==
Name	School
Brian Anderson	Wright State
Jody Brown	UIC
Pat Burwitz	Western Illinois
Steve Horley	Cleveland State
Kris Jarosz	Wright State
Mike Petak	UIC
Shawn Ramion	Cleveland State
Tony Ramsdell	Wright State
Jon Sbrocco	Wright State
Dennis Skoda	UIC
Chris Zunich	Cleveland State

=== Tournament Most Valuable Player ===
Jody Brown of UIC was named Tournament MVP.
