= Fair Grounds Field =

Baseball field in Louisiana with no current primary tenant

Coordinates: 32.478350°N 93.783057°W

- Captains Field
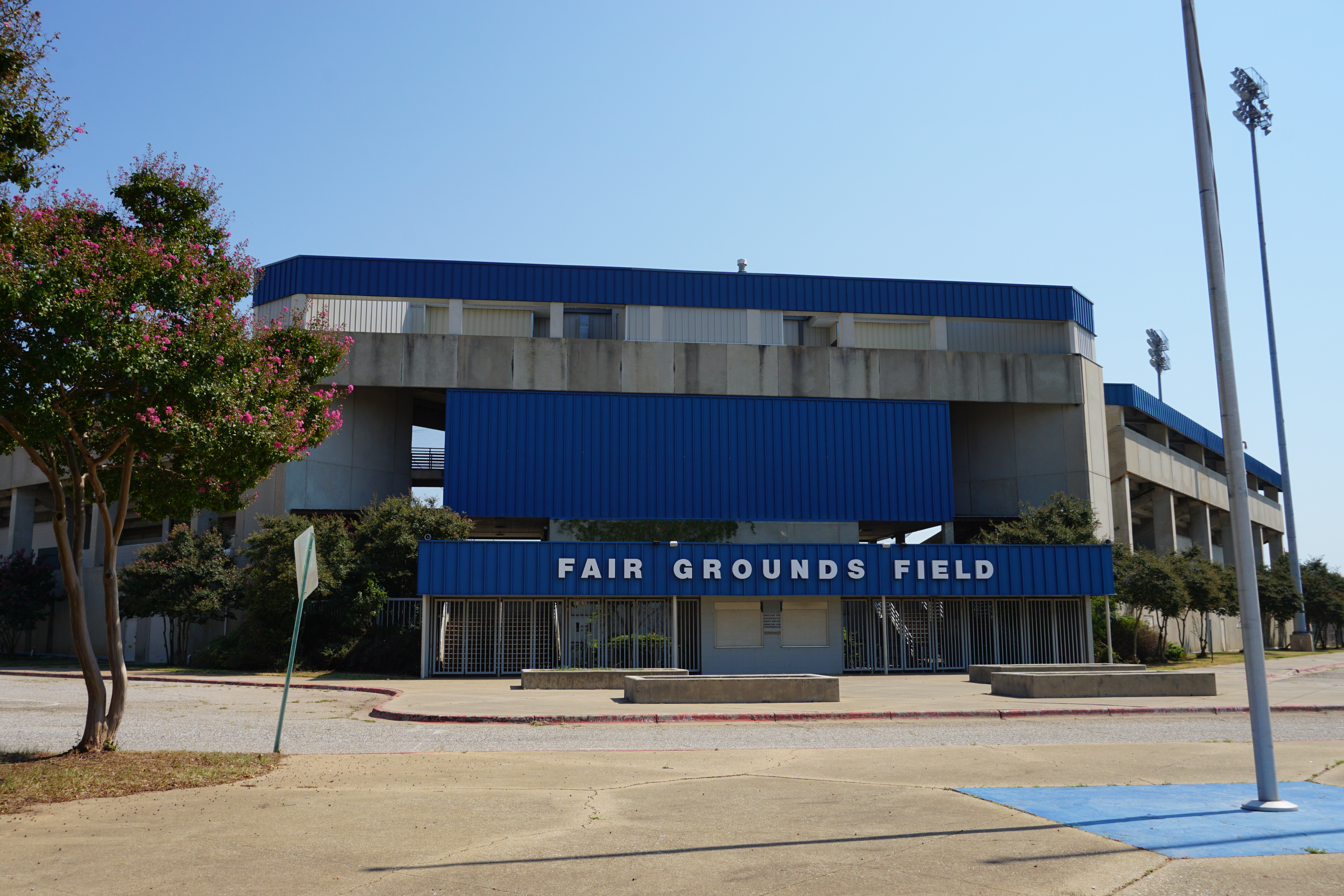
- Interactive map of Fair Grounds Field
- Location: 2901 Pershing Blvd; Shreveport, LA 71109
- Owner: City of Shreveport
- Capacity: 4,200
- Surface: Grass

Construction
- Opened: 1986
- Demolished: 2024–present

Tenants
- Shreveport Captains (TL) 1986–2000; Shreveport Swamp Dragons (TL) 2001–2002; Shreveport-Bossier Sports (CBL/AA) 2003–2008; Shreveport-Bossier Captains (AA) 2009–2011

Fair Grounds Field was a baseball stadium in Shreveport, Louisiana, located next to Independence Stadium on the Louisiana State Fair Grounds just off Interstate 20. Fair Grounds Field opened in 1986 and underwent renovations in 1999, 2009, and 2011. The stadium had a seating capacity of 4,200 people.

In the past Fair Grounds Field served as the home field of the Shreveport Captains, Shreveport Swamp Dragons, Shreveport-Bossier Sports, and Shreveport-Bossier Captains minor league and independent baseball teams. Fair Grounds Field hosted the 1986 and 1995 Texas League All-Star Games; 1995 Double-A All-Star Game; 1995, 1996, and 1998 Southland Conference baseball tournament; 2004 Summit League baseball tournament; and 2011 Southwestern Athletic Conference baseball tournament. Fair Grounds Field has hosted many college baseball teams including LSU, Louisiana Tech, Northwestern State, Centenary, and LSU–Shreveport. The facility has also been used by local high school baseball teams.

In 2019, there was a $1 million bond issue, however local voters didn't support it, and as of late, there are no plans from the city of Shreveport on what the future of the property will look like. The city decided to demolish the venue, and a 60 day contract was signed in 2024, with the works expected to be completed in late 2024 or early 2025.
