= Alfred D. Boyer Stadium =

Baseball stadium in Macomb, Illinois

- Interactive map of Alfred D. Boyer Stadium
- Location: Western Avenue and University Drive, Macomb, Illinois, USA
- Coordinates: 40.472853°N 90.686839°W
- Owner: Western Illinois University
- Operator: Western Illinois Athletics
- Capacity: 500
- Surface: Natural grass
- Scoreboard: Daktronics
- Field size: 330 feet (Left field); 372 feet (LCF); 400 feet (Center field); 372 feet (RCF); 330 feet (Right field)

Construction
- Opened: May 6, 2006

Tenant
- Western Illinois Leathernecks (NCAA)

Alfred D. Boyer Stadium is a baseball venue in Macomb, Illinois, United States. It is home to the Western Illinois Leathernecks baseball team of the NCAA Division I Ohio Valley Conference.

The stadium opened on May 6, 2006, and has a seating capacity of 500. The stadium is named for Alfred D. Boyer, Western Illinois Class of 1972, whose $150,000 donation allowed the facility to be built. The venue features a press box, chairback seating, a Daktronics scoreboard, and 60-foot-long dugouts.

== See also ==
- Western Illinois Leathernecks baseball
- Western Illinois Leathernecks
- List of NCAA Division I baseball venues
