= Sioux Falls Stadium =

Baseball stadium in Sioux Falls, South Dakota

Coordinates: 43.559721°N 96.7492°W

Sioux Falls Stadium is a multi-purpose stadium in Sioux Falls, South Dakota. It originally opened in 1941 and was renovated in 2000.

The ballpark first hosted the minor league baseball Sioux Falls Canaries of the Northern League in 1941 to 1942 and 1946 to 1953. The Canaries were followed by the Sioux Falls Packers who played in the facility from 1966 to 1971 as a Cincinnati Reds minor league affiliate in the Northern League.

It is primarily used for baseball and is the home field of the unaffiliated Sioux Falls Canaries baseball team of the American Association. It was their home stadium when they won the American Association championship in 2008. It has also been the home of the Sioux Falls Cougars baseball team since 2017. The stadium is nicknamed "The Birdcage". The stadium has a capacity of up to 4,462 people.

Events and tenants
Preceded by Cohen Stadium	Host of the AAB All-Star Game; Sioux Falls Stadium; 2007	Succeeded by Midway Stadium
