= Missouri State Bears baseball =

Missouri State Bears
- 2026 Missouri State Bears baseball team
- Founded: 1964
- University: Missouri State University
- Head coach: Joey Hawkins (2nd season)
- Conference: Conference USA
- Location: Springfield, Missouri
- Home stadium: Route 66 Stadium (capacity: 8,000)
- Nickname: Bears
- Colors: Maroon and white

College World Series appearances
- 2003

NCAA regional champions
- 2003, 2015, 2017

NCAA tournament appearances
- 1987, 1995, 1996, 1997, 1999, 2002, 2003, 2012, 2015, 2017, 2018, 2022, 2026

Conference tournament champions
- 1984, 1985, 1986, 1987, 1988, 1989, 1996, 1997, 2015, 2018, 2022

Conference regular season champions
- 1986, 1988, 1989, 1990, 2001, 2003, 2009, 2015, 2017, 2018, 2025

The Missouri State Bears baseball team represents Missouri State University, which is located in Springfield, Missouri. The Bears are an NCAA Division I college baseball program that competes in Conference USA. They began competing in Division I in 1983, and joined the Missouri Valley Conference in 1991 after seven seasons with the Mid-Continent Conference. They joined Conference USA in 2025.

The Missouri State Bears play all home games on campus at Route 66 Stadium. Under the direction of former head coach Keith Guttin, the Bears have played in 12 NCAA Tournaments, and they reached the College World Series in 2003. Over their 29 seasons in the Missouri Valley Conference, they have won six MVC regular-season titles and four MVC tournaments.

Since the program's inception in 1964, 20 Bears have gone on to play in Major League Baseball, highlighted by three-time All-Star and 2006 NL MVP Ryan Howard.

== Missouri State in the NCAA Tournament ==
Year	Record	Pct	Notes
1987	0–2	.000	West II Regional
1995	0–2	.000	West Regional
1996	2–2	.500	Central I Regional
1997	2–2	.500	Central Regional
1999	2–2	.500	Fayetteville Regional
2002	2–2	.500	Lincoln Regional
2003	5-3	.625	College World Series 7th place, Columbus Super Regional Champions, Lincoln Regional Champions
2012	1–2	.333	Coral Gables Regional
2015	4–2	.667	Fayetteville Super Regional, hosted Springfield Regional
2017	3-3	.500	Fort Worth Super Regional, Fayetteville Regional Champions
2018	1–2	.333	Oxford Regional
2022	1–2	.333	Stillwater Regional
2026	0–2	.000	Lawrence Regional
Totals	23-30	.434	
