= Purdue Fort Wayne Mastodons =

Athletic team of Purdue University Fort Wayne

- University: Purdue University Fort Wayne
- Conference: Horizon League (primary); MIVA (men's volleyball)
- NCAA: Division I
- Athletic director: Kelley Hartley Hutton
- Location: Fort Wayne, Indiana
- Varsity teams: 14
- Basketball arena: Hilliard Gates Sports Center
- Soccer stadium: Hefner Soccer Complex
- Mascot: Don the Mastodon
- Nickname: Mastodons
- Fight song: Go 'Dons!
- Colors: Black and gold
- Website: gomastodons.com

The Purdue Fort Wayne Mastodons, formerly known as the IPFW Mastodons and Fort Wayne Mastodons, are the intercollegiate athletic teams that represent Purdue University Fort Wayne (PFW). The school's athletic program includes 14 varsity sports teams. Their mascot is a Mastodon named Don, and the school colors are black and gold. The university participates in the NCAA's Division I as members of the Horizon League in all varsity sports except for men's volleyball, which competes in the Midwestern Intercollegiate Volleyball Association. Purdue Fort Wayne offers seven varsity sports for men and seven for women.

== History ==
=== IPFW ===
At the start of athletics competition, the school was known as IPFW, the abbreviation for Indiana University–Purdue University Fort Wayne. In 1968, a large bone was discovered during the installation of a farm pond near Angola, Indiana, about 40 miles (65 km) north of Fort Wayne. The farmer who owned the property contacted professors in the IPFW geology department, who identified his discovery as the leg bone of a mastodon. Faculty and students from the geology department excavated the greater part of an adult mastodon, including the skull and tusks. The bones were cleaned, preserved, and placed on permanent display at IPFW. In 1970, members of the geology club, led by professors who oversaw the excavation, successfully lobbied the student government committee charged with choosing a name for the university mascot to select the mastodon. And thus, the IPFW Mastodons were born. In addition to serving as a mascot, “Mastodon” is used as the athletic moniker for team members and school-spirited references to the student body. The selection of the mastodon as mascot, as well as a tongue-in-cheek borrowing of the term “Don” from its academic British English use, lends itself to use as a suffix to refer to the athletics teams as well, such as "Volleydons" for the volleyball teams. In a related reference, the Mastodon STOMP pep band instills school spirit among the fans during home matches and games. By using the nickname "Mastodons," Purdue Fort Wayne is one of the few schools to use an extinct organism as a nickname, along with the Amherst Mammoths and the Maranatha Baptist Sabercats.

When the school first fielded athletic teams, it competed as an NCAA Division III independent. In the summer of 1981, the Mastodons made a jump to NCAA Division II where they remained independent. Prior to the 1984–85 school year, the Mastodons joined the Great Lakes Valley Conference, their first-ever conference affiliation. At the start of the 2001–02 academic year, the Mastodons joined NCAA Division I as an independent. IPFW joined its first Division I conference in July 2007, joining the Summit League.

IPFW was reorganized in the mid-2010s, eventually splitting into Indiana University Fort Wayne and Purdue University Fort Wayne. One of the first results of this action was the discontinuation of the tennis teams at the end of the 2014–2015 academic year. The teams had won Summit League regular-season (men's: 2012; women's: 2009, 2010, 2011, 2013) and tournament (women's 2010, 2011, 2013) championships.

=== Fort Wayne ===
On August 8, 2016, shortly before the start of the 2016–17 school year, IPFW athletic director Kelley Hartley Hutton announced that effective immediately, "Fort Wayne" would be the university's exclusive athletic brand. The school's "IPFW" academic branding was not affected. The Summit League has called the athletic program "Fort Wayne" since 2012, in line with a conference initiative to use geographic names to describe metropolitan campuses such as IPFW. When the school announced the athletic brand change, it noted,

Some Mastodon teams have already been using Fort Wayne on uniforms since this recommendation, but the use has been limited and resulted in some confusion. Outside of northeast Indiana, there is also considerable confusion about the "IPFW" acronym, with misnomers being common—even among those involved in Division I athletics.

=== Purdue Fort Wayne ===
Indiana University and Purdue University in Fort Wayne officially separated on July 1, 2018, with IU taking responsibility for IPFW's degree programs in health sciences and Purdue retaining all other academic programs. Thereafter, the Mastodons represented Purdue University Fort Wayne. With the name change, the school's colors changed from royal blue and White to the old gold and black used by the other three Purdue University campuses. On June 18, 2018, the school announced that beginning July 1, 2018 all NCAA sports teams will be known as the Purdue Fort Wayne Mastadons. In addition, a new logo was revealed in which the color blue is incorporated as a secondary color to the university's official school colors of gold and black.

Because NCAA rules bar players from two different schools from competing on the same team, IU Fort Wayne students became ineligible for Mastodons athletics. At the time the separation was announced, five of the roughly 240 Fort Wayne varsity athletes were in academic majors that became part of the new IU Fort Wayne campus, with three possibly requiring NCAA waivers to remain athletically eligible.

The school moved from the Summit League to the Horizon League in July 2020. The official announcement of this move noted that PFW would be near the geographic center of its new league, with an average distance of 170 miles (274 km) from the other members. At that time, media also noted that PFW's longest road trip in the Horizon League — 344 miles (554 km) to Green Bay — would be shorter than its shortest Summit League trip, which was 367 miles (591 km) to Western Illinois. PFW's Horizon League announcement took place several months before Robert Morris University, located in suburban Pittsburgh, Pennsylvania, announced it would also join the Horizon League in 2020. The addition of Robert Morris increased PFW's average conference road trip to about 210 miles (338 km), but Green Bay remains PFW's longest Horizon League road trip.

== Branding ==
Purdue Fort Wayne was originally named Indiana University, Purdue University Fort Wayne. Following a rebrand to Purdue Fort Wayne in 2018, the athletic department instituted a new logo. That logo was then refreshed in 2025 to the current mark.

== Sports sponsored ==
Purdue Fort Wayne has 14 NCAA Division I varsity teams: seven varsity sports for men and seven for women. The men's volleyball team is a member of the Midwestern Intercollegiate Volleyball Association. The newest Mastodon sports are men's indoor and outdoor track & field, reinstated in 2019–20 after having been dropped by IPFW in 2005.

=== Baseball/Softball ===
The baseball and softball programs were discontinued after the 2025 seasons.

=== Men's basketball ===
Before joining NCAA Division I athletics, Fort Wayne competed in the Great Lakes Valley Conference in most sports in the NCAA Division II, where in 1993, the men's basketball team led, by brothers Sean and Shane Gibson, achieved the ranking of No. 4 in the country in NCAA Division II competition. Dane Fife was named the IPFW men's basketball head coach during summer 2005. Fife, who left after the 2010–11 season, was the youngest NCAA Division I head coach at the time of his appointment, at the age of 26. Tony Jasick replaced Fife as the head coach. Jon Coffman is the current head coach of the program, announced on April 10, 2014.

== Venues ==
During its existence as IPFW, it hosted the 2000 NCAA Men's Volleyball Championship matches at the Allen County War Memorial Coliseum, which is adjacent to the campus. Most athletic events are held in the Hilliard Gates Sports Center, Hefner Soccer Complex or the Lutheran Health Fieldhouse on the PFW campus.

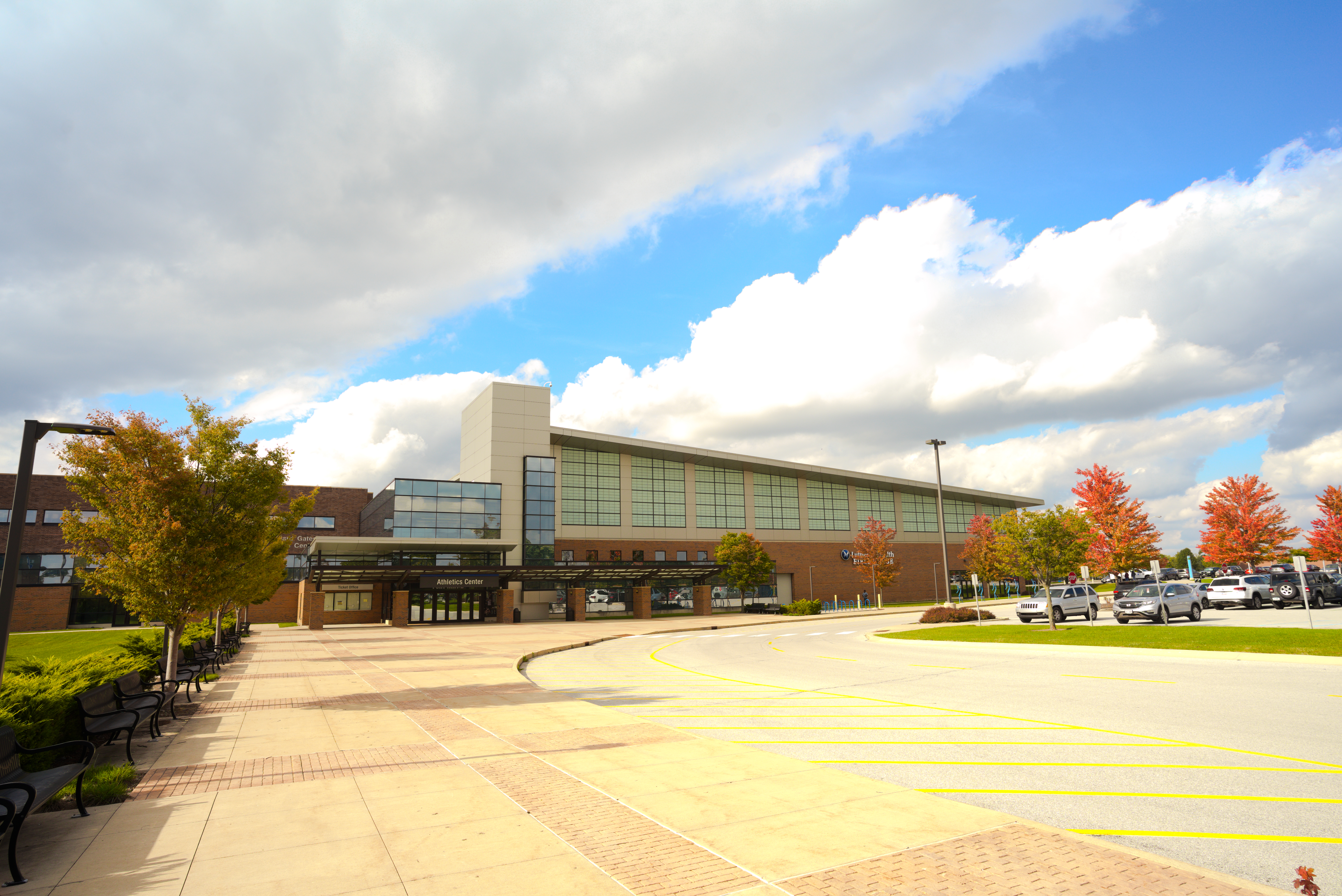
Hilliard Gates Sports Center & Athletic Center

== Club sports ==
Purdue Fort Wayne announced in 2025 the reinstatement of several club sports, including football, basketball and soccer.
