= Centenary Gentlemen baseball =

- University: Centenary College of Louisiana
- Head coach: Mike Diaz (7th season)
- Conference: SCAC
- Location: Shreveport, Louisiana
- Home stadium: Shehee Stadium
- Nickname: Gentlemen
- Colors: Maroon and white

The Centenary Gentlemen baseball team is a varsity intercollegiate athletic team of Centenary College of Louisiana in Shreveport, Louisiana, United States. The team is a member of the Southern Collegiate Athletic Conference (SCAC), which is part of the National Collegiate Athletic Association's Division III. Prior to 2011, Centenary was a member of the NCAA Division I, and competed in the Summit League. The Gentlemen are coached by Mike Diaz. In 2013, the Gents won the Southern Collegiate Athletic Conference regular season, the school's first regular season championship since 1988. The Gents repeated as SCAC regular season champions in 2015.

The team plays its home games in Shreveport at Shehee Stadium. The stadium, originally named Centenary Park, was completely renovated in 2000 under then Centenary baseball head coach Ed McCann and renamed Shehee Stadium.

== Major League Baseball ==
Centenary has had 20 Major League Baseball draft selections since the draft began in 1965.

Gentlemen in the Major League Baseball Draft
Year	Player	Round	Team
1979	Mitchell Ashmore	36	Rangers
1979	Kenneth Babcock	33	Athletics
1980	Kenneth Babcock	22	Astros
1980	Larry Kiesling	19	Astros
1980	Mitchell Ashmore	12	Twins
1981	Larry Kiesling	9	Padres
1981	Mitchell Ashmore	1	Royals
1982	Andy Watson	16	Pirates
1982	Dave Coss	8	Pirates
1988	Roy Gilbert	22	Orioles
1992	Steve Nutt	24	Phillies
1992	Michael Porter	12	Orioles
1993	Brett McCabe	61	Cubs
1993	Tom Schneider	14	Expos
1995	Mitch McNeely	30	Dodgers
2000	John Lockhart	24	Cardinals
2000	Ralph Hicks	17	Astros
2010	Dakota Robinson	26	Angels
2010	Boone Whiting	18	Cardinals
2011	Seth Lugo	34	Mets
2015	Taylor Henry	21	Mets
