= North Dakota State Bison baseball =

- 2026 North Dakota State Bison baseball team
- Founded: 1909
- Conference history: North Central Conference (1958–2004, Division II) Independent (2005–2007) Summit League (2008–Present)
- University: North Dakota State University
- Athletic director: Matt Larsen
- Head coach: Tyler Oakes (5th season)
- Conference: Summit League
- Location: Fargo, North Dakota
- Home stadium: Newman Outdoor Field (capacity: 4,513)
- Nickname: Bison
- Colors: Green and yellow

NCAA tournament appearances
- Division I 2014, 2021, 2025; Division II; 1969; Pre–Divisions; 1956

Conference tournament champions
- Summit League; 2014, 2021, 2025; North Central Conference; 1969, 1973, 2004

Conference regular season champions
- Summit League; 2022; North Central Conference; 2000

The North Dakota State Bison baseball team is the varsity intercollegiate baseball program of North Dakota State Bison in Fargo, North Dakota, United States. The program's first season was in 1909, and it has been a member of the NCAA Division I Summit League since the start of the 2008 season. Its home venue is Newman Outdoor Field, located on North Dakota State's campus. Tyler Oakes is the team's head coach in his second season. The program has appeared in 3 NCAA Division I tournaments. It has won 6 conference tournament championships and 2 regular season conference titles. As of the start of the 2024 Major League Baseball season, 2 former Bison have appeared in Major League Baseball and 3 are currently in Minor League Baseball.

== History ==
=== Early history ===
The program's first season of play was 1909.

=== Conference affiliations ===
- North Central Conference (1958–2004)
- Independent (2005–2007)
- Summit League (2008–present)

== Newman Outdoor Field ==
The stadium contains the Maury Wills Museum in honor of the former Major League Baseball player who worked for the RedHawks as a coach and a radio analyst.

The first number retired at the stadium was the #8 worn by hometown hero Roger Maris when he played for the Fargo-Moorhead Twins in the 1950s. The outfield distances replicate those of Yankee stadium where Maris made history.

In 2012, college baseball writer Eric Sorenson ranked the field the sixth most underrated venue in Division I baseball.

In 2021, the stadium played host to the second NDSU Baseball team to make it to the 2021 NCAA Division I baseball tournament as the Bison went 14–4 at home that season.

In 2023, the stadium hosted the 2023 Summit League baseball tournament after the NDSU Baseball team won their first Summit League regular season title in program history.

== Head coaches ==
North Dakota State's longest tenured head coach was Mitch McLeod, who coached the team from 1993 to 2007. North Dakota State's most successful coach in the Division 1 era is Tod Brown who had a record of 341–350 in his 14 seasons at NDSU. He also led the Bison to two NCAA tournament berths in 2014 and 2021, including the Bison's first NCAA tournament win when they defeated Nevada 6–1 at the Stanford Regional in the 2021 NCAA Division I baseball tournament.

#	Name	Year	Record
1	Art Rueber	1909–1913	36–16–1
2	Bert Haskins	1914	11–2
3	Howard Wood	1915	8–7
4	Stan Borleske	1920–1921, 1923–1924	21–14–1
5	F.H. Watkins	1922	4–4
6	Stan Kostka	1947	5–3
7	Packy Schaffer	1951	2–8
8	B.C. Bentson	1952–1954, 1957–1961	35–53
9	Cliff Rothrock	1955–1956	19–12
10	Ross Fortier	1962	5–10
11	Roger Shelstad	1963	4–9
12	Vern McKee	1964–1965	21–27
13	Ev Kjelbertson	1966–1968	24–41
14	Ron Bodine	1969–1970	26–15
15	Arlo Brunsberg	1971–1973	45–30
16	Bucky Burgau	1974–1977	41–73
17	Rolf Kopperud	1978–1979	15–39
18	George Ellis	1980–1984	62–138
19	Jim Pettersen	1985–1992	131–203–3
20	Mitch McLeod	1993–2007	347–322–4
21	Tod Brown	2008–2021	341–350
22	Tyler Oakes	2022–present	95–113–1
Overall		1909–2025 (123 years)	1297–1487–10

== Postseason history ==
=== NCAA Division I Tournament results ===
The Bison have appeared in three NCAA Division I tournaments. Their combined record is 2–6.

Year	Regional	Regional Seed	Opponent	Result
2014	Corvallis	#4	#1 Oregon State #2 UNLV	L 1–2; L 1–2
2021	Stanford	#4	#1 Stanford #3 Nevada #2 UC Irvine	L 1–9; W 6–1; L 3–18
2025	Fayetteville	#4	#1 Arkansas #2 Kansas #3 Creighton	L 2–6; W 4–3; L 10–11

=== NCAA Division II Tournament results ===
The Bison appeared in one NCAA Division II tournament. Their record was 2–2.

Year	Regional	Opponent	Result
1969	Mankato	Luther; Southwest Missouri State; Minnesota State Mankato; Southwest Missouri State	W 10-0; L 1-6; W 12-10; L 2-4

=== NCAA Pre–Division Tournament results ===
Before the 1957 season, the NCAA did not divide member schools into any divisions, thus having a master tournament. The Bison appeared in one of these such tournaments, their record was 1–1.

Year	Regional	Opponent	Result
1956	District 5 (Stillwater, OK)	Oklahoma; Bradley	W 8-3; L 2-11

== Notable former players ==
Below is a list of notable former Bison and the seasons in which they played for North Dakota State.

- Neil Wagner (2003–2005) Played for Oakland Athletics in 2011 and the Toronto Blue Jays in 2013–14
- Jay Flaa (2013–2015) Played for the Baltimore Orioles and Atlanta Braves in 2021
- Bennett Hostetler (2017–2021) Currently Plays on Triple-A Jacksonville for the Miami Marlins

== Division I Awards and Honors ==
=== All-Summit League ===
- First Team
  - 2012
    - Tim Colwell
    - John Straka
  - 2013
    - Wes Satzinger
    - Tim Colwell
    - Kyle Kleinendorst
    - Jon Hechtner
  - 2014
    - Michael Leach
  - 2016
    - Drew Fearing
  - 2017
    - Logan Busch
  - 2019
    - Max Loven
  - 2021
    - Bennett Hostetler
    - Jake Malec
    - Cade Feeney
    - Parker Harm
  - 2022
    - Calen Schwabe
    - Logan Williams
  - 2023
    - Peter Brookshaw
    - Druw Sackett
    - Cade Feeney
    - Tristen Roehrich
  - 2024
    - Jake Schaffner
    - Joey Danielson
  - 2025
    - Jake Schaffner
    - Nolan Johnson
    - Danny Lachenmeyer
  - 2026
    - Parker Puetz

=== Summit League Player of the Year ===
- Tim Colwell (2014)

=== Summit League Coach of the Year ===
- Tyler Oakes (2022)

=== Summit League Newcomer of the Year ===
- Max Loven (2019)
- Sheamus Ryan (2026)

=== Summit League Pitcher of the Year ===
- Nolan Johnson (2025)

=== Summit League Defensive Player of the Year ===
- Jake Schaffner (2025)

== See also ==
- List of NCAA Division I baseball programs
