= Chapman Park =

College baseball venue in Tulsa, Oklahoma, US

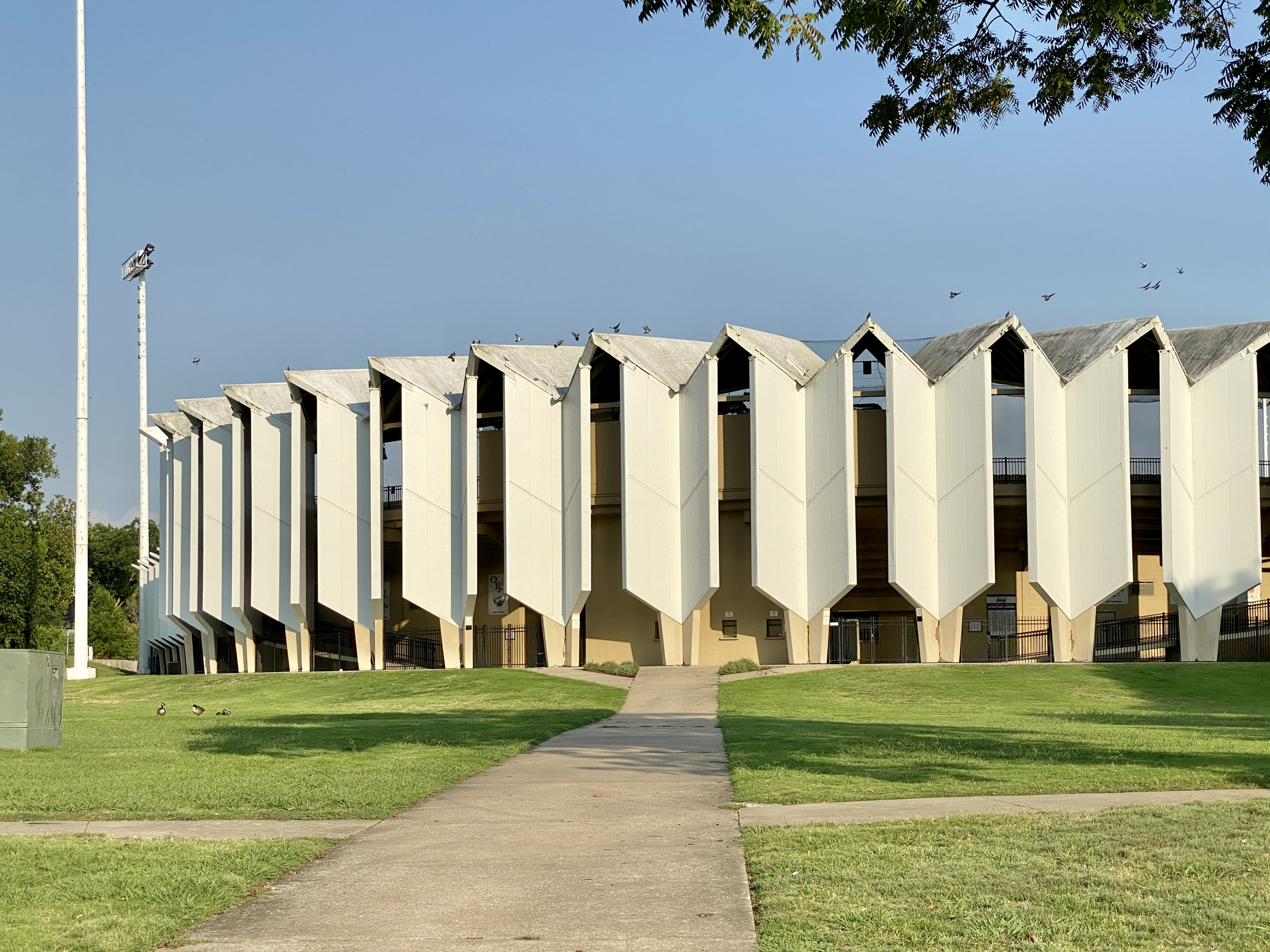
- Interactive map of Chapman Park
- Location: 81st Street and Lewis Avenue, Tulsa, OK, United States
- Coordinates: 36.049894°N 95.948662°W
- Owner: Oral Roberts University
- Operator: Oral Roberts University
- Capacity: 2,418
- Surface: AstroTurf
- Scoreboard: Electronic
- Field size: 330 ft. (LF), 375 ft. (LCF), 400 ft. (CF), 375 ft. (RCF), 330 ft. (RF)

Construction
- Built: 1977–1978
- Opened: March 6, 1978
- Renovated: 2009, 2025

Tenant
- Oral Roberts Golden Eagles baseball (NCAA Division I Summit League) (1978–present)

Chapman Park is a baseball venue in Tulsa, Oklahoma, United States. It is home to the Oral Roberts Golden Eagles baseball team of the NCAA Division I The Summit League. Dedicated on June 17, 1977, the stadium was opened on March 6, 1978, for a game against Southeastern Oklahoma State University. Oral Roberts won the game 7–6. The venue's seated capacity is 2,418 spectators. The ballpark was formerly known as J. L. Johnson Stadium from 1977 to 2025. In 2025, the venue was renovated and renamed Chapman Park following a donation from the Chapman Foundation.

== Features ==
Chapman Park's most notable feature is its cantilevered roof, similar to that of San Juan, Puerto Rico's Estadio Hiram Bithorn and Lynn, Massachusetts's Fraser Field. White, zig-zag patterned paneling forms a roof and facade which cover most of the venue's seating. This seating is elevated, with the first row of seats starting at the dugout roofs' height.

A thirty-foot batter's eye stands in center field, with an electronic scoreboard in right center. The stadium's outfield walls were replaced during 2009 renovations.

The venue also features stadium lighting, dugouts, a mesh backstop, a press box, locker rooms, and practice facilities. In 2006, the Golden Eagle Sports Complex, which includes workout space, an indoor practice facility, baseball offices, and the Grand Slam Room (from which program boosters can watch games), was added. The complex cost $1.6 million on the project.

== Tournaments hosted ==
Chapman Park has hosted many postseason tournaments, the dates of which are listed below.

- NCAA Midwest Regional: 1978, 1980, 1981
- Midwestern Collegiate Conference Tournament: 1981, 1983, 1985
- Mid-Continent Conference Tournament: 1998, 1999, 2000, 2001, 2002, 2003, 2005, 2006
- Summit League Tournament: 2008, 2009, 2010, 2012, 2016, 2017, 2018, 2019, 2022, 2024, 2027

== See also ==
- List of NCAA Division I baseball venues
