= South Dakota State Jackrabbits baseball =

South Dakota State Jackrabbits
- 2026 South Dakota State Jackrabbits baseball team
- Founded: 1947
- Conference history: North Central Conference (1958–2004); Independent (2005–2007)
- University: South Dakota State University
- Athletic director: Justin Sell
- Head coach: Rob Bishop (10th season)
- Conference: Summit League
- Location: Brookings, South Dakota
- Home stadium: Erv Huether Field (capacity: 600)
- Nickname: Jackrabbits
- Colors: Blue and yellow

College World Series appearances
- NCAA Division II; 1984

NCAA tournament appearances
- NCAA Division II; 1973, 1975, 1984, 1990, 1992, 1993, 1994, 1995, NCAA Division I 2013, 2026

Conference tournament champions
- 2013, 2026

Conference regular season champions
- 2010

The South Dakota State Jackrabbits baseball team is the varsity intercollegiate baseball program of South Dakota State Jackrabbits in Brookings, South Dakota, United States. The program's first season was in 1947, and it has been a member of the NCAA Division I Summit League since the start of the 2008 season. Its home venue is Erv Huether Field, located on South Dakota State's campus. Rob Bishop is the team's head coach starting in the 2017 season. The program has appeared in 2 NCAA tournaments at the Division I level, while making 8 at the Division II level. It has won 2 conference tournament championships and 1 regular season conference title. As of the start of the 2026 Major League Baseball season, 6 former Jackrabbits have appeared in Major League Baseball.

== History ==
=== Early history ===
The program's first season of play was 1947.

=== Conference affiliations ===
- North Central Conference (1958–2004)
- Independent (2005–2007)
- Summit League (2008–present)

== Erv Huether Field ==
Erv Huether Field was also the name (from 1974 to 2001) of the Jackrabbit baseball program's home from 1958 to 2001. The old Erv Huether Field was demolished in 2001. From 2001 to 2007, the program played at Bob Shelden Field, a municipal venue in Brookings.

In the spring of 2006, construction began on the present Erv Huether Field. Walls were completed in 2007, and batting cages and dugouts were added in the spring of 2008. On April 21, 2008, the new facility opened with a game against Presentation (SD), which South Dakota State won 22–3. In 2012, permanent seating was added, increasing the capacity for the stadium to 600. A new pressbox was added to the stadium also.

== Head coaches ==
Erv Huether, for whom the venue is named, coached the South Dakota State baseball program for 34 seasons, from 1950 to 1983. His overall record was 352–376–2, and he was awarded several accolades, including a 1984 induction into the American Baseball Coaches Association Hall of Fame.

== NCAA Tournament ==
South Dakota State has appeared in the NCAA Division I baseball tournament twice.

Year	Region	Regional Seed	Opponent	Result
2013	Eugene Regional	#4	Oregon; San Francisco	L 2–3; L 3–4
2026	Lincoln Regional	#4	Nebraska; Arizona State	L 1-4; L 0-17

== Jackrabbits in MLB ==
Below is a list of Jackrabbits alumni and the seasons in which they played in MLB.

- Vean Gregg (1911-1916, 1918, 1925)
- Jerry Crider (1969-1970)
- Caleb Thielbar (2013-15, 2020-present)
- Blake Treinen (2014-2022, 2024-present)
- Layne Somsen (2016)
- Adam Mazur (2024-present)

== See also ==
- List of NCAA Division I baseball programs
