= Western Illinois Leathernecks baseball =

- 2026 Western Illinois Leathernecks baseball team
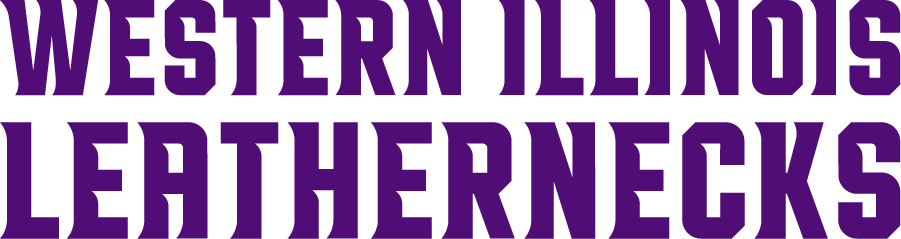
- Founded: 1903–04
- Conference history: Interstate Intercollegiate Athletic (1948–1970); Independent (1971–1984); Summit League (1985–2023)
- University: Western Illinois University
- Athletic director: Paul Bubb
- Head coach: Terry Davis (3rd season)
- Conference: Ohio Valley Conference
- Location: Macomb, Illinois
- Home stadium: Alfred D. Boyer Stadium (Capacity: 500)
- Nickname: Leathernecks
- Colors: Purple and gold

NCAA tournament appearances
- NAIA: 1957, 1968, 1969, 1970; NCAA DII: 1965, 1974, 1978

Conference regular season champions
- IIAC: 1965, 1969; Mid-Cont: 1984

The Western Illinois Leathernecks baseball team is the varsity intercollegiate baseball program of Western Illinois University in Macomb, Illinois, United States. The team is a member of the Ohio Valley Conference, which is part of the National Collegiate Athletic Association's Division I. Western Illinois’ first baseball team was fielded in 1903–04. The team plays its home games at Alfred D. Boyer Stadium, located on Western Illinois's campus. The Leathernecks are coached by Terry Davis. The Leathernecks became a member of the Ohio Valley Conference on July 1, 2023.

== History ==
=== Early history ===
The program's first season of play was 1903–04. On September 19, 2019, Andy Pascoe was named the seventh head coach in Leathernecks history.

=== Conference affiliations ===
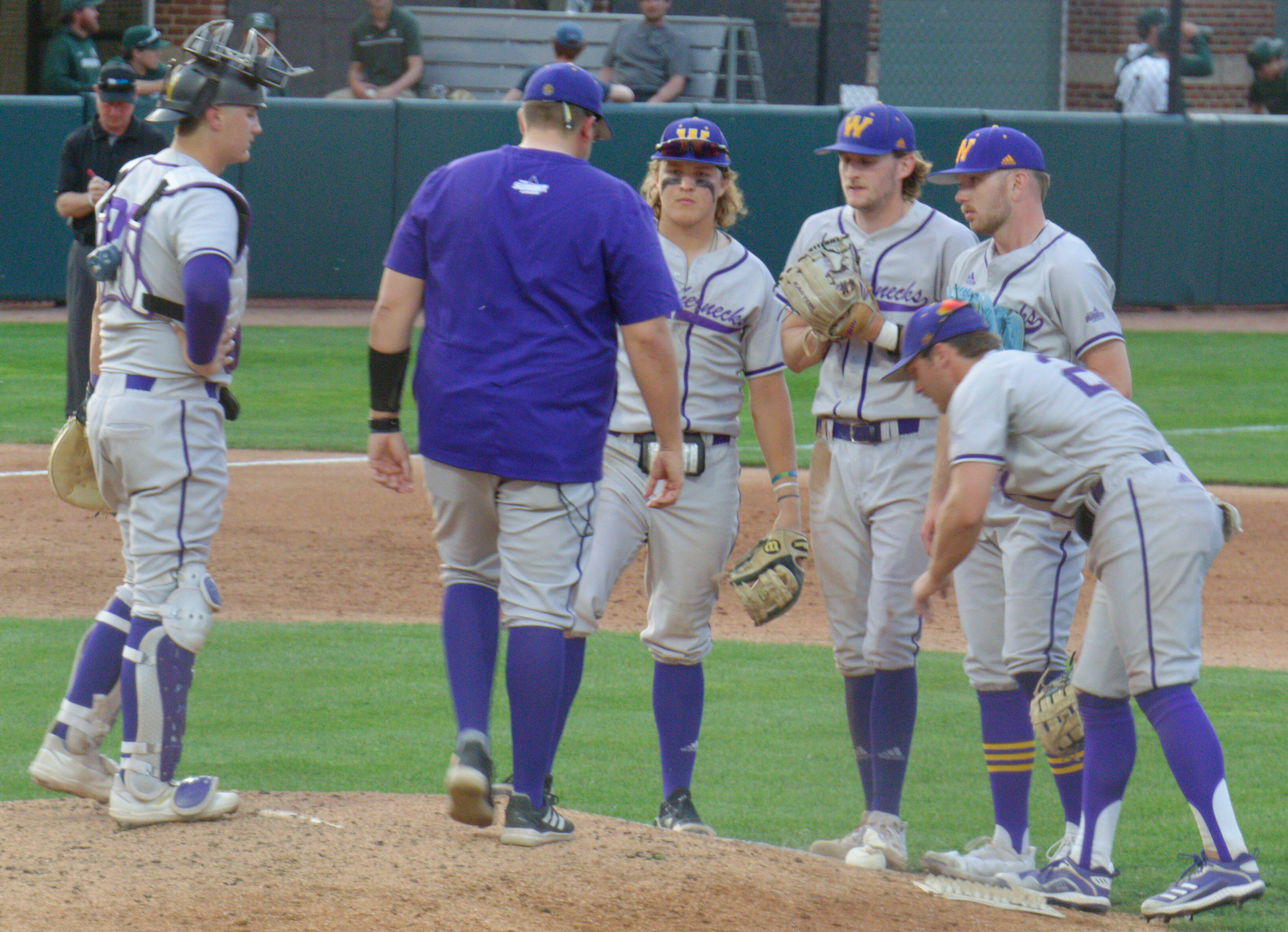
The Leathernecks baseball team conducts a mound visit during a game in 2023

- Interstate Intercollegiate Athletic Conference (1948–1970)
- Independent (1971–1984)
- Summit League (1985–2023)
- Ohio Valley Conference (2024–present)

== Alfred D. Boyer Stadium ==
The stadium opened on May 6, 2006, and has a seating capacity of 500. The stadium is named for Alfred D. Boyer, Western Illinois Class of 1972, whose $150,000 donation allowed the facility to be built. The venue features a press box, chairback seating, a Daktronics scoreboard, and 60-foot-long dugouts.

== Head coaches ==
Western Illinois's longest tenured head coach was Dick Pawlow, who coached the team from 1970 to 1998, winning 545 games.

== Notable former players ==
Below is a list of notable former Leathernecks and the seasons in which they played for Western Illinois.

- Paul Reuschel (1965–1968)
- Rick Reuschel (1967–1970)
- Rick Short (1993–1994)

== See also ==
- List of NCAA Division I baseball programs
