= 2023 North Dakota State Bison baseball team =

American college baseball season

2023 North Dakota State Bison baseball
- Conference: Summit League
- Record: 23–30 (16–7 Summit)
- Head coach: Tyler Oakes (2nd season)
- Assistant coaches: Brandon Hunt; Tanner Neale
- Home stadium: Newman Outdoor Field

2023 Summit League baseball standings
	Conf.				Overall
Team	W		L	PCT	W		L	PCT
No. 8 Oral Roberts ‍†‍‡‍^{y}	23	–	1	.958	52	–	14	.788
North Dakota State ‍‍‍	16	–	7	.696	23	–	30	.434
South Dakota State ‍‍‍	13	–	11	.542	24	–	28	.462
Omaha ‍‍‍	9	–	14	.391	21	–	28	.429
Northern Colorado ‍‍‍	8	–	16	.333	11	–	34	.244
Western Illinois ‍‍‍	8	–	16	.333	12	–	40	.231
St. Thomas* ‍‍‍	6	–	18	.250	10	–	34	.227
† – Conference champion ‡ – Tournament champion y – Invited to the NCAA Tournament * Ineligible for the 2023 NCAA tournament due to transition from Division III; As of June 25, 2023; Rankings from D1Baseball

The 2023 North Dakota State Bison baseball team represented North Dakota State University during the 2023 NCAA Division I baseball season. The Bison played their home games at Newman Outdoor Field adjacent to NDSU's campus. The team was coached by second year head coach Tyler Oakes.

NDSU made the Summit League tournament as the second seed. They lost in the opening round to South Dakota State, survived elimination once with a win over Omaha, but lost to South Dakota State again to be eliminated on day 3 for the second year in a row. The Bison finished the season with a 23–30 overall record with a 16–7 record in Summit League play.

== Previous season ==
The Bison finished last season with a 31-19 overall record, and a 17-5 record in the Summit League good for the team's first Summit League Regular season title. Their conference record was also the program's best since entering the conference. In the Summit League tournament, the Bison opened as the number 1 seed. They lost to Omaha in the opening round, then beat South Dakota State to advance to the elimination round semifinals. However, the Bison fell to Omaha yet again to end their chances of defending their conference title from the previous season.

== Personnel ==
=== Roster ===
2023 North Dakota State Roster
Pitchers: 16 - Nolan Johnson - RS Freshman; 18 - Konnor Kirchoffner - RS Sophomore; 22 - Hayden Sylte - RS Sophomore; 24 - Hunter Rosenbaum - Junior; 25 - Parker Puetz - Freshman; 29 - Kale Hopke - Freshman; 30 - Reese Lightenberg - RS Sophomore; 31 - Max Loven - Senior; 32 - Andrew Baumgart - RS Freshman; 33 - Carson Jacobs - Junior; 35 - Leland Wilson - RS Sophomore; 36 - Zak Endres - Freshman; 37 - Jaxon Edwards - RS Sophomore; 38 - Shea Zetterman - Senior; 40 - Tristen Roehrich - Senior; 44 - Skyler Riedinger - RS Sophomore	Catchers: 7 - Will Busch - Junior; 12 - Stephen Lund - RS Junior; 15 - Bennett Freiter - RS Freshman; Infielders: 2 - Peter Brookshaw - Senior; 5 - Davis Hamilton - Freshman; 6 - James Dunlap - Junior; 9 - Garret Hill - Junior; 11 - Jack Steil - Junior; 13 - Druw Sackett - Senior; 17 - Zach Kluvers - RS Sophomore; 23 - Kale Jensen - Freshman; 26 - Carson Hake - Junior	Outfielders: 1 - Terrell Huggins - Senior; 3 - Kyle Law - Freshman; 4 - Dallan Quigley - Junior; 19 - Cadyn Schwabe - Junior; 20 - Chase Nett - Junior; Utility: 8 - Caden Edwards (LHP/INF) - RS Sophomore; 10 - Cade Feeney (RHP/INF) - Junior; 14 - Wyatt Nelson (RHP/OF) - Junior; 28 - Jack Luster (INF/OF) - Junior; 34 - Joey Danielson (RHP/C) - Junior
Reference:'

=== Coaching staff ===
2023 North Dakota State Coaching Staff
Name	Position
Tyler Oakes	Head coach
Brandon Hunt	Assistant Coach
Tanner Neale	Assistant Coach
Trent Keefer	Volunteer Assistant Coach

== Schedule and results ==
2023 North Dakota State Bison baseball game log
Regular season (22–28)

February (1–7)
Date	Opponent	Rank	Site/stadium	Score	Win	Loss	Save	Attendance	Overall record	Summit League Record
February 17	at Sacramento State		John Smith Field; Sacramento, CA	3–5	Takacs (1–0)	**Feeney (0–1)**	None	307	0–1	–
February 18	at Sacramento State		John Smith Field	6–8	Gibbons (1–0)	**Jacobs (0–1)**	Zalasky (1)	307	0–2	–
February 19	at Sacramento State		John Smith Field	2–3	Lucchesi (1–0)	**Roehrich (0–1)**	Zalasky (2)	260	0–3	–
February 19	at Sacramento State		John Smith Field	13–4	**Johnson (1–0)**	Stewart (0–1)	None	260	1–3	–
February 26	vs. San Diego		Triton Ballpark	Cancelled, Weather Restricting Travel					1–3	–
February 26	vs. Hawaii		Tony Gwynn Stadium; San Diego, CA	1–13	Giroux (1–0)	**Feeney (0–2)**	None		1–4	–
February 26	at San Diego State		Tony Gwynn Stadium	2–9	Brodell (1–1)	**Loven (0–1)**	None	596	1–5	–
February 27	at UC San Diego		Triton Ballpark; La Jolla, CA	1–7	Martinez (1–0)	**Roehrich (0–2)**	None	313	1–6	–
February 27	at UC San Diego		Triton Ballpark	6–14	Alvarez (1–0)	**Danielson (0–1)**	None	313	1–7	–

March (5–13)
Date	Opponent	Rank	Site/stadium	Score	Win	Loss	Save	Attendance	Overall Record	Summit League Record
March 1	at Arizona State		Phoenix Municipal Stadium; Phoenix, AZ	9–10	Lebamoff (1–0)	**Riedinger (0–1)**	None		1–8	–
March 3	at Arizona		Hi Corbett Field; Tucson, AZ	6–8	Nichols (2–0)	**Feeney (0–3)**	Long (2)	2,409	1–9	–
March 4	at Arizona		Hi Corbett Field	6–7^{(12)}	Drees (1–0)	**Jacobs (0–2)**	None	2,755	1–10	–
March 5	at Arizona		Hi Corbett Field	1–11^{(8)}	Zastrow (2–0)	**Roehrich (0–3)**	None	2,324	1–11	–
March 10	at Texas State		Bobcat Ballpark; San Marcos, TX	7–8	Kerbow (1–0)	**Danielson (0–2)**	Dixon (3)	1,453	1–12	–
March 11	at Texas State		Bobcat Ballpark	18–19	Gould (1–0)	**Riedinger (0–2)**	None	1,548	1–13	–
March 12	at Texas State		Bobcat Ballpark	1–5	Wells (3–0)	**Roehrich (0–4)**	None	1,438	1–14	–
March 14	at Texas		UFCU Disch-Falk Field; Austin, TX	2–7	Hurley (1–0)	**Jacobs (0–3)**	None	6,457	1–15	–
March 15	at Texas		UFCU Disch-Falk Field	4–7	Howard (1–0)	**Danielson (0–3)**	Morehouse (1)	6,522	1–16	–
March 18	at Houston Christian		Husky Field; Houston, TX	10–7	**Ligtenberg (1–0)**	Ricker (1–2)	**Riedinger (1)**	103	2–16	–
March 18	at Houston Christian		Husky Field	6–5	**Loven (1–1)**	Wells (0–2)	**Jacobs (1)**	135	3–16	–
March 19	at Houston Christian		Husky Field	5–6	Ricker (2–2)	**Nelson (0–1)**	Ryan (1)	121	3–17	–
March 24	at Omaha		Tal Anderson Field; Omaha, NE	10–2	**Feeney (1–3)**	Riedel (1–3)	None	497	4–17	1–0
March 25	at Omaha		Tal Anderson Field	6–7	Tenney (2–2)	**Loven (1–2)**	Sanders (3)	819	4–18	1–1
March 25	at Omaha		Tal Anderson Field	7–2	**Roehrich (1–4)**	Bell (1–2)	None	819	5–18	2–1
March 28	at Nebraska		Hawks Field; Lincoln, NE	1–4	Walsh (1–1)	**Ligtenberg (1–1)**	Schanaman (3)	4,218	5–19	–
March 31	at South Dakota State		Doc Ross Field; Council Bluffs, IA	10–2	**Feeney (2–3)**	Goble (2–1)	None	103	6–19	3–1
March 31	at South Dakota State		Doc Ross Field	8–9	Bourassa (1–2)	**Johnson (1–1)**	None	103	6–20	3–2

April (9–6)
Date	Opponent	Rank	Site/stadium	Score	Win	Loss	Save	Attendance	Overall Record	Summit League Record
April 1	at South Dakota State		Tal Anderson Field; Omaha, NE	5–4	**Roehrich (2–4)**	Kruger (0–2)	**Puetz (1)**	90	7–20	4–2
April 7	at No. 23 Texas Tech		Dan Law Field at Rip Griffin Park; Lubbock, TX	8–1	**Feeney (3–3)**	Girton (2–1)	**Riedinger (3)**	3,685	8–20	–
April 8	at No. 23 Texas Tech		Dan Law Field at Rip Griffin Park	5–8	Molina (3–2)	**Roehrich (2–5)**	Free (1)	4,432	8–21	–
April 8	at No. 23 Texas Tech		Dan Law Field at Rip Griffin Park	3–8	Parish (2–0)	**Jacobs (0–4)**	Robinson (1)	4,432	8–22	–
April 11	at Minnesota		Siebert Field; Minneapolis, MN	9–12	Clausen (2–0)	**Johnson (1–2)**	None	541	8–23	–
April 14	at St. Thomas		Koch Diamond; St. Paul, MN	13–3^{(8)}	**Feeney (4–3)**	Gartner (1–4)	None	225	9–23	5–2
April 14	at St. Thomas		Koch Diamond	10–4	**Roehrich (3–5)**	Retz (0–3)	**Danielson (1)**	225	10–23	6–2
April 15	at St. Thomas		Koch Diamond	1–2	Coborn (2–2)	**Riedinger (0–3)**	None	241	10–24	6–3
April 18	Mayville State		Newman Outdoor Field; Fargo, ND	Cancelled, Field Conditions					10–24	–
April 21	vs. Oral Roberts; Series Relocated - Field Conditions		Doc Ross Field; Council Bluffs, IA	0–10^{(7)}	Hall (5–3)	**Feeney (4–4)**	None	57	10–25	6–4
April 22	vs. Oral Roberts		Doc Ross Field	4–2	**Riedinger (1–3)**	Denton (1–1)	None	64	11–25	7–4
April 23	vs. Oral Roberts		Doc Ross Field	4–8^{(13)}	Patten (1–1)	**Danielson (0–4)**	None	54	11–26	7–5
April 25	at Minnesota		Siebert Field; Minneapolis, MN	10–3	**Johnson (2–2)**	Malec (0–3)	None	447	12–26	–
April 28	Western Illinois		Newman Outdoor Field	10–0^{(8)}	**Feeney (5–4)**	Armstrong (2–4)	None	258	13–26	8–5
April 29	Western Illinois		Newman Outdoor Field	13–3^{(7)}	**Roehrich (4–5)**	Kapraun (2–6)	None	227	14–26	9–5
April 30	Western Illinois		Newman Outdoor Field	21–3^{(7)}	**Puetz (1–0)**	Kratz (0–4)	None	166	15–26	10–5

May (7–2)
Date	Opponent	Rank	Site/stadium	Score	Win	Loss	Save	Attendance	Overall Record	Summit League Record
May 3	at Nebraska		Hawks Field; Lincoln, NE	6–5	**Jacobs (1–4)**	Perry (0–1)	None	5,374	16–26	–
May 5	at Northern Colorado		Jackson Field; Greeley, CO	7–5^{(10)}	**Riedinger (2–3)**	Sharp (1–1)	None	120	17–26	11–5
May 6	at Northern Colorado		Jackson Field	18–3^{(7)}	**Roehrich (5–5)**	Cruz (1–5)	None	103	18–26	12–5
May 7	at Northern Colorado		Jackson Field	10–0^{(7)}	**Puetz (2–0)**	Murphy (1–4)	None	124	19–26	13–5
May 13	Omaha		Newman Outdoor Field	Cancelled, Rain					19–26	13–5
May 14	Omaha		Newman Outdoor Field	5–0	**Feeney (6–4)**	Tenney (5–6)	None	249	20–26	14–5
May 14	Omaha		Newman Outdoor Field	3–5	Gainer (1–2)	**Roehrich (5–6)**	Sellers (2)	249	20–27	14–6
May 18	South Dakota State		Newman Outdoor Field	5–6	Hawkins (2–4)	**Nelson (0–2)**	Bourassa (8)	206	20–28	14–7
May 19	South Dakota State		Newman Outdoor Field	5–2	**Johnson (3–2)**	Kunz (1–6)	None	228	21–28	15–7
May 20	South Dakota State		Newman Outdoor Field	12–9	**Jacobs (2–4)**	Goble (4–3)	None	322	22–28	16–7

Postseason (1–2)

Summit League Tournament (1–2)
Date	Opponent	Rank	Site/stadium	Score	Win	Loss	Save	Attendance	Overall Record	Summit League Tournament Record
May 24	(3) South Dakota State	(2)	Newman Outdoor Field; Fargo, ND	4–17	Driessen (5–4)	**Feeney (6–5)**	None	581	22–29	0–1
May 25	(4) Omaha; Elimination Game	(2)	Newman Outdoor Field	7–6^{(12)}	**Puetz (3–0)**	Potter (1–1)	None	176	23–29	1–1
May 26	(3) South Dakota State; Elimination Game	(2)	Newman Outdoor Field	2–8	Goble (5–3)	**Jacobs (2–5)**	None	354	23–30	1–2

- Win
- Loss
- Postponement
- Bold: Bison team member
- Rankings from D1Baseball.com:
- (#) Tournament seedings in parentheses.

== Awards and honors ==
First Team All-Summit League

- SS Peter Brookshaw
- OF Druw Sackett
- P Cade Feeney
- P Tristen Roehrich

Second Team All-Summit League

- 1B James Dunlap
- CF Cadyn Schwabe
- P Parker Puetz
- P Skyler Riedinger

Honorable Mention All-Summit League

- C Stephen Lund

Summit League All-Tournament Team

- P Tristen Roehrich
- 1B James Dunlap
