= TSE =

The abbreviation TSE can refer to:

== Education ==
- TSE (examination), Test of Spoken English
- Toulouse School of Economics, in Toulouse, France
- Turku School of Economics, in Turku, Finland

== Finance ==
- Taiwan Stock Exchange
- Tallinn Stock Exchange
- Tehran Stock Exchange
- Tirana Stock Exchange
- Tokyo Stock Exchange
- Toronto Stock Exchange, now TSX

== Health ==
- Testicular self-examination
- Transmissible spongiform encephalopathy
- Turbo spin echo, a sequence of magnetic resonance imaging

== People ==
- Tse (surname), a Chinese surname, the Cantonese spelling of Xie (谢; 謝)
- T. S. Eliot, Anglo-American poet
- Thomas Sayers Ellis, American poet
- Thomas Saunders Evans, was an eminent British scholar of and translator into Latin and Ancient Greek

== Technology ==
- IEEE Transactions on Software Engineering
- The SemWare Editor, a text editor for DOS, OS/2, Windows, and Linux
- Torque Shader Engine, a video game engine used in Xbox and Xbox 360 console systems
- Truck stop electrification, a plan to reduce idling of highway trucks
- Windows NT 4.0 Terminal Server Edition, a Microsoft operating system that provided remote access

== Other uses ==
- Tse (Cyrillic) (Ц, ц), a letter of the Cyrillic alphabet
- Tse Monastery, a 4th-century Christian monastery in Egypt
- Superior Electoral Court (Portuguese: Tribunal Superior Eleitoral, TSE), the highest electoral court in Brazil
- Supreme Electoral Court (disambiguation) (Spanish: Tribunal Supremo Electoral, TSE), a name given to a number of different courts in South America
- Texas South-Eastern Railroad, a Class III Texas railroad
- Total solar eclipse, a rare astronomical event
- Total Sports Entertainment, a sports entertainment and game software company
- Turkish Standards Institution (Turkish: Türk Standardları Enstitüsü, TSE), a public standards organization in Turkey
- An old IATA airport code for Nursultan Nazarbayev International Airport, now NQZ

== See also ==
- Tsetse (disambiguation)
