= 2023 Summit League baseball tournament =

- Teams: 4
- Format: Double-elimination
- Finals site: Newman Outdoor Field; Fargo, North Dakota
- Champions: Oral Roberts (21st title)
- Winning coach: Ryan Folmar (6th title)
- MVP: Justin Quinn (Oral Roberts)
- Television: WDAY Xtra/WDAY Sports+

2023 Summit League baseball standings
	Conf.				Overall
Team	W		L	PCT	W		L	PCT
No. 8 Oral Roberts ‍†‍‡‍^{y}	23	–	1	.958	52	–	14	.788
North Dakota State ‍‍‍	16	–	7	.696	23	–	30	.434
South Dakota State ‍‍‍	13	–	11	.542	24	–	28	.462
Omaha ‍‍‍	9	–	14	.391	21	–	28	.429
Northern Colorado ‍‍‍	8	–	16	.333	11	–	34	.244
Western Illinois ‍‍‍	8	–	16	.333	12	–	40	.231
St. Thomas* ‍‍‍	6	–	18	.250	10	–	34	.227
† – Conference champion ‡ – Tournament champion y – Invited to the NCAA Tournament * Ineligible for the 2023 NCAA tournament due to transition from Division III; As of June 25, 2023; Rankings from D1Baseball

The 2023 Summit League baseball tournament took place from May 24 through 27, 2023. The top four out of seven teams in the conference's regular season will meet in the double-elimination tournament held at Newman Outdoor Field on the campus of North Dakota State University in Fargo, North Dakota. The defending champion was Oral Roberts, who successfully defended their title and earned the Summit League's automatic bid to the 2023 NCAA Division I baseball tournament.

== Standings and seeding ==
The top four teams from the regular season were seeded one through four based on conference winning percentage during the modified double round-robin regular season. The teams then played a double-elimination tournament.

Place	Seed	Team	Conference			Overall		
Place	Seed	Team	W	L	%	W	L	%
1	1	Oral Roberts	23	1	.958	43	11	.796
2	2	North Dakota State	16	7	.696	22	28	.440
3	3	South Dakota State	13	11	.542	22	26	.458
4	4	Omaha	9	14	.391	21	26	.447
5		Northern Colorado	8	16	.333	11	33	.250
6		Western Illinois	8	16	.333	11	41	.212
7		St. Thomas	6	18	.250	10	34	.227

- St. Thomas is not eligible for the Summit League and NCAA tournaments until 2026
- Northern Colorado and Western Illinois did not participate in the tournament

== Results ==
First round May 24/25; WDAY Xtra/Sports+
1	Oral Roberts	9
4	Omaha	2
2	North Dakota State	4
3	South Dakota State	17
Lower round 1
2	North Dakota State^{(12)}	7
4	Omaha	6

Semi-finals; May 25/26; WDAY Xtra/Sports+
1	Oral Roberts	15
3	South Dakota State	2
Lower final
2	North Dakota State	2
3	South Dakota State	8

Finals; May 27; WDAY Xtra/Sports+
1	Oral Roberts	12	–
3	South Dakota State	4	–

== All-Tournament Team ==
The following players were named to the all-tournament team:

Player	School
Justin Quinn (MVP)	Oral Roberts
Jakob Hall	Oral Roberts
Harley Gollert	Oral Roberts
Mac McCroskey	Oral Roberts
Jacob Godman	Oral Roberts
Holden Breeze	Oral Roberts
Nic Nelson	South Dakota State
Jess Bellows	South Dakota State
Reece Anderson	South Dakota State
Ryan Bourassa	South Dakota State
Jake Goble	South Dakota State
Tristen Roehrich	North Dakota State
James Dunlap	North Dakota State
Eddie Satisky	Omaha
