= 2023 Oral Roberts Golden Eagles baseball team =

College Baseball Season

2023 Oral Roberts Golden Eagles baseball

Summit League Regular season champions Summit League tournament champions Stillwater Regional champions Eugene Super Regional champions

College World Series, 1–2
- Conference: Summit League

Ranking
- Coaches: No. 8
- CB: No. 5
- Record: 52–14 (23–1 Summit)
- Head coach: Ryan Folmar (11th season)
- Assistant coaches: Ryan Neill (14th season); Wes Davis (3rd season); Jimmy Turk (1st season)
- Home stadium: J. L. Johnson Stadium

2023 Summit League baseball standings
	Conf.				Overall
Team	W		L	PCT	W		L	PCT
No. 8 Oral Roberts ‍†‍‡‍^{y}	23	–	1	.958	52	–	14	.788
North Dakota State ‍‍‍	16	–	7	.696	23	–	30	.434
South Dakota State ‍‍‍	13	–	11	.542	24	–	28	.462
Omaha ‍‍‍	9	–	14	.391	21	–	28	.429
Northern Colorado ‍‍‍	8	–	16	.333	11	–	34	.244
Western Illinois ‍‍‍	8	–	16	.333	12	–	40	.231
St. Thomas* ‍‍‍	6	–	18	.250	10	–	34	.227
† – Conference champion ‡ – Tournament champion y – Invited to the NCAA Tournament * Ineligible for the 2023 NCAA tournament due to transition from Division III; As of June 25, 2023; Rankings from D1Baseball

The 2023 Oral Roberts Golden Eagles baseball team represented Oral Roberts University during the 2023 NCAA Division I baseball season. The Golden Eagles played their home games at J. L. Johnson Stadium as a member of the Summit League. They were led by head coach Ryan Folmar, in his eleventh season at Oral Roberts.

== Previous season ==
The 2022 team finished the season with a 38–20 record and a 17–7 record in the Summit League. In the 2022 Summit League baseball tournament, the second-seeded Golden Eagles beat in the final Omaha 21–2 and earned a bid into the 2022 NCAA Division I baseball tournament, where they were fourth seed in the College Station Regional. There, the Golden Eagles lost against top-seed Texas A&M and next day against the second-seeded TCU and eliminated.

== Preseason ==
=== Summit League Coaches'poll ===
Predicted finish	Team	Votes (1st place)
1	Oral Roberts	42 (6)
2	North Dakota State	36 (1)
3	Omaha	30
4	South Dakota State	24
5	St. Thomas	17
6	Northern Colorado	12
7	Western Illinois	7

Source: 2023 Summit League Baseball Preseason Poll

=== Award watch lists ===
First Team All-Americans
Player	No.	Position	Class	Selector(s)
Cade Denton	36	RP	Junior	NCBWA

Stopper of the Year Award
Player	No.	Position	Class	Selector(s)
Cade Denton	36	RP	Junior	NCBWA

== Offseason ==
=== Signing Day Recruits ===
The following players signed National Letter of Intents to play for Oral Roberts in 2023.

Player	Hometown	High School
Pitchers
Hudson Hart	Gretna, Nebraska	Gretna HS
Hitters
—

=== 2022 MLB draft ===
Two Oral Roberts players were drafted in the 2022 MLB draft.

Round	Pick	Player	Position	MLB Team
10	309	Isaac Coffey	RHP	Boston Red Sox
13	403	Jackson Loftin	SS	Houston Astros

== Schedule and results ==
2023 Oral Roberts Golden Eagles baseball game log
Regular season (43–11)

February (6–2)
Date	Opponent	Rank	Site/stadium	Score	Win	Loss	Save	TV	Attendance	Overall record	Summit Record	Notes
February 17; 3:00 pm	Northern Illinois*		J. L. Johnson Stadium; Tulsa, OK	**W** 16–2	**Jakob Hall (1–0)**	Dominic Hann (0–1)	—	ORUSN	1,213	1–0	—	Stats; Story
February 18 (Note: Part of a doubleheader.); 2:00 pm	Northern Illinois*		J. L. Johnson Stadium	**W** 8–2	**Harley Gollert (1–0)**	Jacob Wilde (0–1)	**Dalton Patten (1)**	ORUSN	620	2–0	—	Stats; Story
February 18; 5:30 pm	Northern Illinois*		J. L. Johnson Stadium	**W** 3–2^{10}	**Conner Floyd (1–0)**	Reagan Klawiter (0–1)	—	ORUSN	212	3–0	—	Stats; Story
February 19; 12:00 pm	Northern Illinois*		J. L. Johnson Stadium	**W** 6–1	**Brooks Fowler (1–0)**	DJ Hess (0–1)	—	ORUSN	463	4–0	—	Stats; Story
February 22; 3:00 pm	Missouri State*		J. L. Johnson Stadium	**L** 5–8	Tyler Tscherter (1–0)	**Joshua Caravalho (0–1)**	Scott Youngbrandt (1)	ORUSN	302	4–1	—	Stats; Story
February 24; 6:00 pm	at Texas State*		Bobcat Ballpark; San Marcos, TX	**L** 2–3	Levi Wells (2–0)	**Jakob Hall (1–1)**	Triston Dixon (1)		1,623	4–2	—	Stats; Story
February 25; 2:30 pm	at Texas State*		Bobcat Ballpark	**W** 6–3	**Harley Gollert (2–0)**	Zeke Wood (1–1)	**Cade Denton (1)**	ESPN+	1,715	5–2	—	Stats; Story
February 26; 3:00 pm	at Texas State*		Bobcat Ballpark	**W** 8–4	**Caleb Isaacs (1–0)**	Nathan Medrano (0–1)	—	ESPN+	1,408	6–2	—	Stats; Story

March (12–7)
Date	Opponent	Rank	Site/stadium	Score	Win	Loss	Save	TV	Attendance	Overall record	Summit Record
March 1	Tarleton State*		J. L. Johnson Stadium	**W** 6–5	**Joshua Caravalho (1–1)**	Cris Enriquez (1–1)	**Dalton Patten (2)**	ORUSN	764	7–2	—
March 3	Stephen F. Austin*		J. L. Johnson Stadium	**L** 9–16	Skyler Jaco (1–1)	**Jakob Hall (1–2)**	—	ORUSN	613	7–3	—
March 4	Stephen F. Austin*		J. L. Johnson Stadium	**L** 2–4^{12}	Benny Emmons III (1–0)	**Jacob Widener (0–1)**	—	ORUSN	813	7–4	—
March 5	Stephen F. Austin*		J. L. Johnson Stadium	**W** 9–1	**Brooks Fowler (2–0)**	Conner Woods (0–1)	**Evan Kowalski (1)**	ORUSN	764	8–4	—
March 7	at Wichita State*		Eck Stadium; Wichita, KS	**W** 6–5	**Joshua Caravalho (2–1)**	Caden Favors (1–1)	**Cade Denton (2)**	ESPN+	1,147	9–4	—
March 10	at Dallas Baptist*		Horner Ballpark; Dallas, TX	**L** 1–2	Brady Rose (1–0)	**Jakob Hall (1–3)**	Kyle Amendt (2)	PBN	851	9–5	—
March 11	at Dallas Baptist*		Horner Ballpark	**L** 5–15	Alec Baker (1–0)	**Dalton Patten (0–1)**	—	PBN	892	9–6	—
March 12	at Dallas Baptist*		Horner Ballpark	**L** 0–3	Bryson Hammer (3–1)	**Brooks Fowler (2–1)**	Kyle Amendt (3)	PBN	896	9–7	—
March 14	at Tarleton State*		Tarleton Baseball Complex; Stephenville, TX	**W** 9–6	**Cade Denton (1–0)**	Grant Garza (2–1)	—	WAC International	120	10–7	—
March 15	at Abilene Christian*		Crutcher Scott Field; Abilene, TX	**L** 8–10	Zach Smith (1–0)	**Jacob Widener (0–2)**	Blake Anderson (2)	WAC International	563	10–8	—
March 17	St. Thomas		J. L. Johnson Stadium	**W** 10–2	**Jakob Hall (2–3)**	Evan Esch (1–2)	—	ORUSN	544	11–8	1–0
March 18	St. Thomas		J. L. Johnson Stadium	**W** 21–2^{7}	**Harley Gollert (3–0)**	Jacob Mrosko (0–2)	—	ORUSN	585	12–8	2–0
March 19	St. Thomas		J. L. Johnson Stadium	**W** 8–2	**Caleb Isaacs (2–0)**	Duke Coborn (0–1)	**Cade Denton (3)**	ORUSN	586	13–8	3–0
March 21	Wichita State*		J. L. Johnson Stadium	**W** 5–2	**Evan Kowalski (1–0)**	Caden Favors (2–2)	**Cade Denton (4)**	ORUSN	713	14–8	—
March 24	at Memphis*		FedExPark; Memphis, TN	**W** 11–1	**Jakob Hall (3–3)**	David Warren (2–1)	**Evan Kowalski (2)**		177	15–8	—
March 25	at Memphis*		FedExPark	**L** 5–7	Dalton Fowler (2–3)	**Harley Gollert (3–1)**	—		528	15–9	—
March 26	at Memphis*		FedExPark	**W** 10–3	**Joshua Caravalho (3–1)**	JT Durham (3–2)	**Cade Denton (5)**		411	16–9	—
March 28	at Missouri State*		Hammons Field; Springfield, MO	**W** 4–0	**Jacob Widener (1–2)**	Forrest Barnes (1–1)	—		383	17–9	—
March 31	Western Illinois		J. L. Johnson Stadium	**W** 16–5^{7}	**Caleb Isaacs (3–0)**	Eric Cunning (0–1)	—	ORUSN	734	18–9	4–0

April (14–2)
Date	Opponent	Rank	Site/stadium	Score	Win	Loss	Save	TV	Attendance	Overall record	Summit Record
April 1	Western Illinois		J. L. Johnson Stadium	**W** 7–2	**Harley Gollert (4–1)**	Jake Armstrong (2–3)	**Dalton Patten (3)**	ORUSN	801	19–9	5–0
April 2	Western Illinois		J. L. Johnson Stadium	**W** 13–3^{8}	**Joshua Caravalho (4–1)**	Jack Bell (0–2)	—	ORUSN	607	20–9	6–0
April 4	Oklahoma*		J. L. Johnson Stadium	**L** 2–12	Braden Carmichael (1–0)	**Evan Kowalski (1–1)**	—	ORUSN	1,941	20–10	—
April 6	at Omaha		Tal Anderson Field; Omaha, NE	**W** 5–4	**Brooks Fowler (3–1)**	Caleb Riedel (1–4)	**Cade Denton (6)**		378	21–10	7–0
April 7	at Omaha		Tal Anderson Field	**W** 16–9	**Joshua Caravalho (5–1)**	Preston Tenney (3–3)	—		505	22–10	8–0
April 8	at Omaha		Tal Anderson Field	**W** 8–5	**Caleb Isaacs (4–0)**	Brennen Bales (0–1)	**Cade Denton (7)**		506	23–10	9–0
April 11	at No. 18 Oklahoma State*		O'Brate Stadium; Stillwater, OK	**W** 8–5	**Caleb Isaacs (5–0)**	Gabe Davis (0–2)	**Cade Denton (8)**	ESPN+	4,781	24–10	—
April 14	Northern Colorado		J. L. Johnson Stadium	**W** 10–0^{8}	**Jakob Hall (4–3)**	Dylan Smith (2–6)	—	ORUSN	1,347	25–10	10–0
April 15	Northern Colorado		J. L. Johnson Stadium	**W** 12–6	**Harley Gollert (5–1)**	Trey Cruz (0–5)	**Cade Denton (9)**	ORUSN	813	26–10	11–0
April 16	Northern Colorado		J. L. Johnson Stadium	**W** 13–3^{8}	**Brooks Fowler (4–1)**	Zack Herrick (0–4)	—	ORUSN	904	27–10	12–0
April 21	vs. North Dakota State		Doc Ross Field (Note: Series Relocated - Field Conditions.); Council Bluffs, IA	**W** 10–0^{7}	**Jakob Hall (5–3)**	Cade Feeney (4–4)	—		57	28–10	13–0
April 22	vs. North Dakota State		Doc Ross Field	**L** 2–4	Skyler Riedinger (1–3)	**Cade Denton (1–1)**	—		64	28–11	13–1
April 23	vs. North Dakota State		Doc Ross Field	**W** 8–4^{13}	**Dalton Patten (1–1)**	Joey Danielson (1–3)	—		54	29–11	14–1
April 25	at Oklahoma		Mitchell Park; Norman, OK	**Canceled due to inclement weather**							
April 28	South Dakota State		J. L. Johnson Stadium	**W** 5–3	**Jakob Hall (6–3)**	Brady Hawkins (0–4)	**Cade Denton (10)**	ORUSN	1,025	30–11	15–1
April 29	South Dakota State		J. L. Johnson Stadium	**W** 10–3	**Harley Gollert (6–1)**	Blake Kunz (0–4)	**Jacob Widener (1)**	ORUSN	1,213	31–11	16–1
April 30	South Dakota State		J. L. Johnson Stadium	**W** 18–7^{7}	**Brooks Fowler (5–1)**	Jake Goble (4–2)	—	ORUSN	1,026	32–11	17–1

May (11–0)
Date	Opponent	Rank	Site/stadium	Score	Win	Loss	Save	TV	Attendance	Overall record	Summit Record	Notes
May 2; 6:00 pm	Oklahoma State*		J. L. Johnson Stadium	**W** 9–7	Jacob Widener (2–2)	Brian Hendry (2–1)	—	ORUSN	2,273	33–11	—	Stats; Story
May 5; 1:00 pm	at St. Thomas		Koch Diamond; St. Paul, MN	**W** 8–3	Caleb Isaacs (6–0)	Duke Coborn (2–4)	—		229	34–11	18–1	Stats; Story
May 6; 12:00 pm	at St. Thomas		Koch Diamond	**W** 11–2	Harley Gollert (7–1)	Nolan Kemp (0–3)	**Dalton Patten (4)**		230	35–11	19–1	Stats; Story
May 7; 1:00 pm	at St. Thomas		Koch Diamond	**W** 8–1	Brooks Fowler (6–1)	Evan Esch (2–3)	—		413	36–11	20–1	Stats; Story
May 9; 6:00 pm	at Wichita State*		Eck Stadium	**W** 4–1	Dalton Patten (2–1)	Robert Cranz (1–2)	**Cade Denton (11)**	ESPN+	1,692	37–11	—	Stats; Story
May 12; 6:00 pm	Southern Indiana*		J. L. Johnson Stadium	**W** 12–4	Jakob Hall (7–3)	Trent Robinson (1–3)	—	ORUSN	1,084	38–11	—	Stats; Story
May 13; 2:00 pm	Southern Indiana*		J. L. Johnson Stadium	**W** 9–2	Harley Gollert (8–1)	Blake Ciuffetelli (2–1)	—	ORUSN	1,247	39–11	—	Stats; Story
May 14; 1:00 pm	Southern Indiana*		J. L. Johnson Stadium	**W** 5–0	Brooks Fowler (7–1)	Tyler Hutson (1–7)	—	ORUSN	1,170	40–11	—	Stats; Story
May 18; 3:00 pm	at Western Illinois		Alfred D. Boyer Stadium; Macomb, IL	**W** 7–4	Harley Gollert (9–1)	Jack Bell (2–5)	**Cade Denton (12)**		94	41–11	21–1	Stats; Story
May 19; 2:00 pm	at Western Illinois		Alfred D. Boyer Stadium	**W** 12–2	Dalton Patten (3–1)	Tyler Kapraun (3–7)	—		67	42–11	22–1	Stats; Story
May 20; 1:00 pm	at Western Illinois		Alfred D. Boyer Stadium	**W** 12–0^{8}	Brooks Fowler (8–1)	Jake Armstrong (4–6)	—		150	43–11	23–1	Stats; Story

Postseason (9–1)

Summit League Tournament (3–0)
Date	Opponent	Rank	Site/stadium	Score	Win	Loss	Save	TV	Attendance	Overall record	SummitT Record	Notes
May 24; 12:00 pm	vs. (4) Omaha	(1)	Newman Outdoor Field; Fargo, ND	**W** 9–2	**Harley Gollert (10–1)**	Harrison Kreiling (0–4)	—	WDAY Xtra/WDAY Sports+	89	44–11	1–0	Stats; Story
May 25; 6:00 pm	vs. (3) South Dakota State	(1)	Newman Outdoor Field	**W** 15–2	**Jakob Hall (8–3)**	Blake Kunz (1–7)	—	WDAY Xtra/WDAY Sports+	283	45–11	2–0	Stats; Story
May 27; 1:00 pm	vs. (3) South Dakota State	(1)	Newman Outdoor Field	**W** 12–4	**Brooks Fowler (9–1)**	Ryan Bourassa (3–3)	—	WDAY Xtra/WDAY Sports+	162	46–11	3–0	Stats; Story

Stillwater Regional (3–0)
Date	Opponent	Rank	Site/stadium	Score	Win	Loss	Save	TV	Attendance	Overall record	NCAAT record	Notes
June 2; 6:00 pm	at (1) No. 16 Oklahoma State	(4)	O'Brate Stadium	**W** 6–4	**Caleb Isaacs (7–0)**	Nolan McLean (1–2)	**Cade Denton (13)**	ESPN+	5,423	47–11	1–0	Stats; Story
June 3; 8:00 pm	vs. (3) Washington	(4)	O'Brate Stadium	**W** 15–12	**Evan Kowalski (2–1)**	Grant Cunningham (1–3)	**Cade Denton (14)**	ESPN+	4,716	48–11	2–0	Stats; Story
June 4; 8:00 pm	vs. (2) No. 18 Dallas Baptist	(4)	O'Brate Stadium	**W** 6–5	**Dalton Patten (4–1)**	Brady Rose (7–2)	**Cade Denton (15)**	ESPN+	4,782	49–11	3–0	Stats; Story

Eugene Super Regional (2–1)
Date	Opponent	Rank	Site/stadium	Score	Win	Loss	Save	TV	Attendance	Overall record	NCAAT record	Notes
June 9; 7:00 pm	at No. 29 Oregon		PK Park; Eugene, OR	**L** 8–9	Josh Mollerus (3–2)	**Dalton Patten (4–2)**	—	ESPN	4,476	49–12	3–1	Stats; Story
June 10; 8:00 pm	at No. 29 Oregon		PK Park	**W** 8–7	**Cade Denton (2–1)**	Josh Mollerus (3–3)	—	ESPNU	4,476	50–12	4–1	Stats; Story
June 11; 5:00 pm	at No. 29 Oregon		PK Park	**W** 11–6	**Caleb Isaacs (8–0)**	Jackson Pace (2–4)	**Dalton Patten (5)**	ESPNU	4,476	51–12	5–1	Stats; Story

College World Series (1–2)
Date	Opponent	Rank	Site/stadium	Score	Win	Loss	Save	TV	Attendance	Overall record	NCAAT record	Notes
June 16; 1:00 pm	vs No. 17 TCU		Charles Schwab Field Omaha; Omaha, NE	**W** 6–5	**Cade Denton (3–1)**	Luke Savage (5–4)	—	ESPN	24,134	52–12	6–1	Stats; Story
June 18; 6:00 pm	vs (2) No. 2 Florida		Charles Schwab Field Omaha	**L** 4–5	Hurston Waldrep (10–3)	**Harley Gollert (10–2)**	Cade Fisher (2)	ESPN2	24,841	52–13	6–2	Stats; Story
June 20; 1:00 pm	vs No. 17 TCU		Charles Schwab Field Omaha	**L** 1–6	Luke Savage (6–4)	**Brooks Fowler (9–2)**	—	ESPN	23,496	52–14	6–3	Stats; Story

Legend: = Win = Loss = Canceled
Bold = Oral Roberts team member
"*" indicates a non-conference game.
"#" represents ranking. All rankings are based on the team's current ranking in the D1Baseball poll.
"()" represents postseason seeding in the Summit League Tournament or NCAA Regional, respectively.
All times are in Central Time.

== Statistics ==
=== Team batting ===
Team	AB	Avg.	H	2B	3B	HR	RBI	BB	SO	SB
Oral Roberts	2340	.321	750	132	19	98	489	332	496	99
Opponents	2153	.241	519	80	8	81	269	229	615	40

=== Team pitching ===
Team	IP	H	R	ER	BB	SO	SV	ERA
Oral Roberts	582.1	519	279	261	229	615	23	4.03
Opponents	565.1	750	544	480	332	496	6	7.64

== Rankings ==
Ranking movements Legend: ██ Increase in ranking ██ Decrease in ranking — = Not ranked RV = Received votes
	Week																		
Poll	Pre	1	2	3	4	5	6	7	8	9	10	11	12	13	14	15	16	17	Final
Coaches'	—	—*	—	—	—	—	—	—	—	—	—	—	—	—	—	—	—*	—*	8
Baseball America	—	—	—	—	—	—	—	—	—	—	—	—	—	—	—	—	—*	—*	7
Collegiate Baseball^	RV	—	—	—	—	—	—	—	—	30	30	24	16	12	10	10	7	6	5
NCBWA†	RV	RV	RV	—	—	—	—	RV	RV	RV	RV	RV	RV	RV	29	RV	14	14*	6
D1Baseball	—	—	—	—	—	—	—	—	—	—	—	—	—	—	—	—	—*	—*	8

^ Collegiate Baseball ranked 40 teams in their preseason poll, but only ranked 30 teams weekly during the season.
† NCBWA ranks 35 teams in their preseason poll, but only ranks 30 teams weekly during the season.
* A new poll was not released for this week, so for comparison purposes, the previous week's ranking is inserted in this week's slot.

== Awards and honors ==
Summit League honors
Honors	Player	Year	Position
Summit League Player of the Year	Jonah Cox	Junior	INF/OF
Summit League Pitcher of the Year	Cade Denton	Junior	RHP
Summit League Newcomer of the Year	Jonah Cox	Junior	INF/OF
Summit League Defensive Player of the Year	Mac McCroskey	Redshirt Senior	INF
Summit League Coach of the Year	Ryan Folmar	11th season	Manager
All-Summit League First Team	Jake McMurray	Senior	1B
All-Summit League First Team	Jonah Cox	Junior	OF
All-Summit League First Team	Matt Hogan	Redshirt Senior	OF
All-Summit League First Team	Drew Stahl	Junior	DH
All-Summit League First Team	Jakob Hall	Sophomore	SP
All-Summit League First Team	Cade Denton	Junior	RP
All-Summit League Second Team	Jacob Godman	Senior	C
All-Summit League Second Team	Holden Breeze	Redshirt Junior	3B
All-Summit League Second Team	Mac McCroskey	Redshirt Senior	SS
All-Summit League Second Team	Justin Quinn	Senior	OF
All-Summit League Second Team	Brooks Fowler	Sophomore	SP
All-Summit League Second Team	Harley Gollert	Redshirt Senior	SP
All-Summit League Honorable Mention	Blaze Brothers	Senior	UT

Regional honors
Honors	Player	Year	Position	Performance
Stillwater Regional Most Outstanding Player	Cade Denton	Junior	RHP	3 SV, 4.0 IP, 7 SO, 2.25 ERA

National honors
Honors	Player	Year	Position	Selector(s)
Stopper of the Year	Cade Denton	Junior	RHP	NCBWA
All-American First Team	Cade Denton	Junior	RP	ABCA
All-American First Team	Cade Denton	Junior	RP	BA
All-American First Team	Cade Denton	Junior	RP	NCBWA
All-American First Team	Jonah Cox	Junior	OF	ABCA
All-American First Team	Jonah Cox	Junior	OF	CB
All-American Second Team	Jonah Cox	Junior	OF	NCBWA
All-American Second Team	Cade Denton	Junior	RP	CB
All-American Third Team	Jonah Cox	Junior	OF	BA
All-American Third Team	Matt Hogan	Redshirt Senior	OF	NCBWA
Coach of the Year	Ryan Folmar	11th	Manager	NCBWA
