= Newman Field =

Newman Field may refer to:

- Newman Field (Salisbury, North Carolina), a stadium on the campus of Catawba College, Salisbury, North Carolina
- Newman Outdoor Field, a baseball stadium in Fargo, North Dakota
