= Total Sports =

Total Sports may refer to:

- Total Sports Publishing
- Total Sports Entertainment
- Total Sports TV
- Total Sports Network
