= Tsetse (disambiguation) =

Tsetse flies are one of the large biting flies inhabiting much of mid-continental Africa between the Sahara and the Kalahari deserts.

Tsetse may also refer to:

- Tse Tse Fly (band), a late 1980s/early 1990s British rock band
- De Havilland Mosquito, FB Mk XVIII version was nicknamed Tsetse
- Tsetse (nuclear primary), the common design nuclear fission bomb core for several Cold War designs for American nuclear and thermonuclear weapons
- Tsetse, South Africa, a village in South Africa
