= Supreme Electoral Tribunal =

Supreme Electoral Tribunal may refer to:

- Supreme Electoral Tribunal of Bolivia
- Superior Electoral Court, Brazil
- Supreme Electoral Court of Costa Rica
- Supreme Electoral Court (El Salvador)
- Supreme Electoral Tribunal (Guatemala)
- Supreme Electoral Tribunal (Honduras)

== See also ==
- Supreme Electoral Court (disambiguation)
