= 2023 Oklahoma Sooners baseball team =

College Baseball Season

2023 Oklahoma Sooners baseball

Charlottesville Regional, 1–2
- Conference: Big 12 Conference
- Record: 32–28 (11–13 Big 12)
- Head coach: Skip Johnson (6th season)
- Associate head coach: Reggie Willits (2nd season)
- Assistant coaches: Clay Overcash (6th season); Russell Raley (1st season)
- Home stadium: L. Dale Mitchell Baseball Park

2023 Big 12 Conference baseball standings
	Conf.				Overall
Team	W		L	PCT	W		L	PCT
No. 14 Texas ‍†‍‍^{y}	15	–	9	.625	42	–	22	.656
Oklahoma State ‍†‍‍^{y}	15	–	9	.625	41	–	20	.672
West Virginia ‍†‍‍^{y}	15	–	9	.625	40	–	20	.667
No. 5 TCU ‍‍‡‍^{y}	13	–	11	.542	44	–	24	.647
Kansas State ‍‍‍	13	–	11	.542	35	–	24	.593
Texas Tech ‍‍‍^{y}	12	–	12	.500	41	–	23	.641
Oklahoma ‍‍‍^{y}	11	–	13	.458	32	–	28	.533
Kansas ‍‍‍	8	–	16	.333	25	–	32	.439
Baylor ‍‍‍	6	–	18	.250	20	–	35	.364
† – Conference champion ‡ – Tournament champion y – Invited to the NCAA tournament As of June 25, 2023; Rankings from D1baseball

The 2023 Oklahoma Sooners baseball team represented the University of Oklahoma during the 2023 NCAA Division I baseball season. The Sooners played their home games at L. Dale Mitchell Baseball Park as a member of the Big 12 Conference. They were led by head coach Skip Johnson, in his 6th season at Oklahoma.

== Previous season ==
The Sooners finished the 2022–23 season with a 45–24 overall record and a 15–9 record in Big 12 play. Coming in as the third-seed in the 2022 Big 12 Conference baseball tournament, the Sooners defeated their longtime rivals fifth-seeded Texas to win their third Big 12 conference tournament championship. Receiving an automatic bid for the 2022 NCAA Division I baseball tournament, the Sooners defeated Liberty, Florida, and Virginia Tech in the Blacksburg Super Regional. In the 2022 College World Series, the Sooners defeated Texas A&M in the first round and the semifinals, Notre Dame in the second round, before falling to Ole Miss in the finals, losing both games.

== Offseason ==
=== Departures ===
Outgoing transfers
Player	Position	Height	Year	New team	Ref.
Ben Abram	RHP	6'7"	Redshirt junior	Oklahoma State	
Keegan Allen	RHP/OF	6'0"	Freshman	West Virginia	
Cade Brown	RHP	6'4"	Redshirt junior	Murray State	
Luke Carrell	LHP	6'2"	Freshman	Northwest Florida State	
Brock Daniels	INF	6'1"	Freshman	Missouri	
Luc Fladda	LHP	6'1"	Freshman	Johnson County	
Mason Lowe	INF	5'11"	Redshirt junior	Central Missouri	
Brayden Luikart	LHP/OF	6'0"	Freshman	Johnson County	
Max McGwire	INF	6'2"	Freshman	San Diego	
Hudson Polk	C	6'1"	Sophomore	Arkansas	
Creed Watkins	RHP	6'5"	Redshirt sophomore	NC State	

Draft
Round	Pick	Player	Position	Height	Team	Ref.
1	7	Cade Horton	IF/RHP	6'1"	Chicago Cubs	
2	45	Jake Bennett	LHP	6'6"	Washington Nationals	
2	51	Peyton Graham	INF	6'4"	Detroit Tigers	
4	127	Jimmy Crooks	C	6'0"	St. Louis Cardinals	
7	224	Blake Robertson	INF	6'5"	Tampa Bay Rays	
10	290	Tanner Tredaway	OF	6'0"	Pittsburgh Pirates	
10	297	Trevin Michael	RHP	6'2"	Detroit Tigers	
11	325	David Sandlin	RHP	6'4"	Kansas City Royals	
17	505	Chazz Martinez	LHP/OF	6'3"	Kansas City Royals	
18	536	Javier Ramos	RHP	6'6"	Colorado Rockies	
19	579	Jaret Godman	RHP	6'1"	Boston Red Sox	
Undrafted
Undrafted		Brett Squires	IF/OF	6'3"	Kansas City Royals	

Cade Horton, Jake Bennett, and Peyton Graham's draft selections marked the first time the Sooners ever had three players selected in the first two rounds of the MLB draft. Under head coach Skip Johnson, the Sooners have produced three first-round draft picks in five years with Horton being selected seventh overall. Horton became the Sooner's highest draft pick since Jon Gray in 2013.

=== Additions ===
Incoming transfers
Player	Position	Height	Year	Former team	Ref.
Blake Bales	RHP	6'5"	Graduate student	Virginia	
Will Carsten	RHP	6'7"	Junior	McLennan	
Kale Davis	RHP	6'3"	Redshirt junior	Oklahoma State	
Braxton Douthit	RHP	5'10"	Graduate student	Lamar	
Dakota Harris	IF	6'0"	Junior	Polk State	
Gray Harrison	RHP	6'1"	Junior	McLennan	
James Hitt	LHP	6'0"	Redshirt sophomore	Texas Tech	
Anthony Mackenzie	IF	5'11"	Junior	Sam Houston	
Bryce Madron	OF	5'8"	Junior	Cowley	
Peyton Olejnik	RHP	6'9"	Sophomore	Triton	
Carson Pierce	RHP	6'3"	Junior	Cowley	
Mason Strong	C	5'11"	Sophomore	BYU	
Gray Thomas	RHP	6'3"	Sophomore	TCU	
Adam Walker	RHP	6'2"	Junior	Dodge City	
Aaron Weber	RHP	6'4"	Sophomore	Cowley	

Incoming recruits
Player	Position	Height	Hometown	High school	Ref.
Easton Carmichael	C	6'1"	Prosper, Texas	Prosper High School	
Camden Chalfant	RHP	6'1"	Edmond, Oklahoma	Edmond Memorial High School	
Patrick Engskov	IF	6'0"	Little Rock, Arkansas	Pulaski Academy	
Rocco Garza-Gongora	OF/1B	6'2"	Laredo, Texas	John B. Alexander High School	
Julien Hachem	LHP	6'7"	Oak Park, Illinois	Mount Carmel High School	
Gabe Murrell	RHP	6'1"	Edmond, Oklahoma	Edmond North High School	
Caden Powell	IF	6'2"	Clinton, Oklahoma	Clinton High School	
Carson Turnquist	RHP	6'5"	Paso Robles, California	Paso Robles High School	
Eric Van Valkenburg	RHP	6'2"	Solana Beach, California	Torrey Pines High School	
Tavion Vaughns	OF	6'1"	Grand Prairie, Texas	Cedar Hill High School	

== Preseason ==
=== Big 12 media poll ===
Predicted finish	Team	Votes (1st place)
1	TCU	61 (5)
2	Oklahoma State	59 (4)
3	Texas Tech	48
4	Texas	43
5	Oklahoma	38
6	West Virginia	28
7	Kansas State	17
8	Kansas	16
9	Baylor	14

Source: 2023 Big 12 Baseball Preseason Poll

=== Preseason Big 12 Awards ===
Position	Player	Class
All-Big 12 Team
Jackson Nicklaus	IF	Sophomore
John Spikerman	OF	Sophomore

Source: 2023 Big 12 Baseball Preseason Awards

== Roster and personnel ==
=== Roster ===
Oklahoma Sooners Roster
Pitchers: 13 – Peyton Olejnik – Sophomore (6'9", 174); 17 – Aaron Calhoun – Sophomore (5'10", 165); 21 – Carson Pierce – Junior (6'3", 215); 22 – Aaron Weber – Sophomore (6'4", 222); 23 – Braxton Douthit – Graduate (5'10", 200); 29 – Jett Lodes – Junior (5'10", 172); 32 – Colton Sundloff – Sophomore (6'5", 200); 34 – Carson Atwood – Junior (6'0", 195); 35 – Gray Thomas – Sophomore (6'3", 212); 37 – Carson Turnquist – Freshman (6'5", 224); 40 – Kale Davis – (redshirt) RS Junior (6'3", 217); 41 – Gray Harrison – Junior (6'1", 165); 45 – Will Carsten – Junior (6'7", 226); 50 – Gabe Murrell – Freshman (6'1", 178); 52 – Griffin Miller – (redshirt) RS Senior (6'2", 187); 55 – Adam Walker – Junior (6'2", 184); 58 – Camden Chalfant – Freshman (6'1", 204); 99 – Eric Van Valkenburg – Freshman (6'2", 189)	Catchers: 2 – Easton Carmichael – Freshman (6'1", 189); 19 – Mason Strong – Sophomore (5'11", 183)'; 31 Kade Fletcher – (redshirt) RS Junior (6'1", 196)'; Infielders: 3 – Anthony Mackenzie – Junior (5'11", 182); 6 – Wallace Clark – Sophomore (6'0", 192); 9 – Patrick Engskov – Freshman (6'0", 182); 10 – Dakota Harris – Junior (6'0", 197); 15 – Jackson Nicklaus – Sophomore (6'0", 182); 18 – Caden Powell – Freshman (6'2", 208); Outfielders: 7 – Kendall Pettis – (redshirt) RS Junior (5'11", 190); 8 – John Spikerman – Sophomore (6'0", 177); 11 – Sebastian Orduno – (redshirt) RS Junior (5'10", 190); 12 – Bryce Madron – Junior (5'8", 175); 16 – Tavion Vaughns – Freshman (6'1", 208); 20 – Rocco Garza-Gongora – Freshman (6'2", 167); Utility Players: 1 – Diego Muniz – 5th (5'8", 205)

=== Personnel ===
Oklahoma Sooners Coaching Staff
Skip Johnson – Head coach; Reggie Willits – Associate head coach; Clay Overcash – Assistant coach; Russell Raley – Volunteer assistant; Ryan Gaines – Director of operations; Britt Bonneau – Director of player development

Reggie Willits was promoted to associate head coach after joining the Sooners staff as a volunteer assistant during the 2022 season. After five seasons as an assistant coach for the Sooners, Clay Van Hook was named head coach of the UT Arlington baseball program.

== Schedule ==
2023 Oklahoma baseball game log
Legend: = Win = Loss = Canceled Bold = Oklahoma team member
Regular season (30–24)

February (4–4)
Date	Time (CT)	TV	Opponent	Rank	Stadium	Score	Win	Loss	Save	Attendance	Overall Record	Big 12 Record	Sources
Feb. 17	3:00 pm	ESPN+	vs. California Baptist*	—	Mitchell Park; Norman, OK	**W** 5–2	**Davis** **(1–0)**	Mattox (0–1)	**Calhoun** **(1)**	1,405	1–0	—	Stats; Recap
Feb. 18	2:00 pm	ESPN+	vs. California Baptist*	—	Mitchell Park; Norman, OK	**L** 2–5	Downer (1–0)	**Harrison** **(0–1)**	Olsen (1)	1,261	1–1	—	Stats; Recap
Feb. 19	2:00 pm	ESPN+	vs. California Baptist*	—	Mitchell Park; Norman, OK	**L** 3–6	Wilson (1–0)	**Calhoun** **(0–1)**	Delgado (1)	1,635	1–2	—	Stats
Feb. 20	3:00 pm	ESPN+	vs. Air Force*	—	Mitchell Park; Norman, OK	**W** 8–6	**Pierce** **(1–0)**	Peters (0–1)	–	1,250	2–2	—	Stats; Recap
Feb. 22	6:00 pm	ESPN+	vs. Abilene Christian*	—	Globe Life Field; Arlington, TX	**L** 3–4	Huffling (1–0)	**Thomas** **(0–1)**	–	—	2–3	—	Stats; Recap
Feb. 24	3:00 pm	ESPN+	vs. Rider*	—	Mitchell Park; Norman, OK	**L** 3–6	Sachais (2–1)	**Campbell** **(0–1)**	Kirwin (2)	377	2–4	—	Stats; Recap
Feb. 25	1:00 pm	ESPN+	vs. Rider*	—	Mitchell Park; Norman, OK	**W** 7–2	**Carsten** **(1–0)**	Doelling (1–1)	**Pierce** **(1)**	378	3–4	—	Stats; Recap
Feb. 26	1:00 pm	ESPN+	vs. Rider*	—	Mitchell Park; Norman, OK	**W** 11–1	**Douthit** **(1–0)**	Young (0–1)	–	908	4–4	—	Stats; Recap

March (10–9)
Date	Time (CT)	TV	Opponent	Rank	Stadium	Score	Win	Loss	Save	Attendance	Overall Record	Big 12 Record	Sources
Mar. 1	6:30 pm	—	vs. UT Arlington*	—	Clay Gould Ballpark; Arlington, TX	Canceled due to weather and field conditions.							
Mar. 3	2:00 pm	D1Baseball	vs. California*	—	Dr. Pepper Ballpark; Frisco, TX	**W** 9–5				—	5–4	—	Stats
Mar. 4	1:00 pm	D1Baseball	vs. Mississippi State*	—	Dr. Pepper Ballpark; Frisco, TX	**W** 15–9				—	6–4	—	Stats; Recap
Mar. 5	3:00 pm	D1Baseball	vs. Ohio State*	—	Dr. Pepper Ballpark; Frisco, TX	**L** 9–12				—	6–5	—	Stats; Recap
Mar. 7	1:00 pm	ESPN+	vs. UNLV*	—	Mitchell Park; Norman, OK	**W** 11–6				301	7–5	—	Stats; Recap
Mar. 8	1:00 pm	ESPN+	vs. UNLV*	—	Mitchell Park; Norman, OK	**W** 8–7				304	8–5	—	Stats; Recap
Mar. 10	6:30 pm	ESPN+	vs. Houston*	—	Schroeder Park; Houston, TX	**W** 13–1				1,150	9–5	—	Stats; Recap
Mar. 11	6:30 pm	ESPN+	vs. Houston*	—	Schroeder Park; Houston, TX	**W** 8–3				1,483	10–5	—	Stats
Mar. 12	1:00 pm	ESPN+	vs. Houston*	—	Schroeder Park; Houston, TX	**W** 7–6				1,439	11–5	—	Stats; Recap
Mar. 14	6:00 pm	ESPN+	vs. Wichita State*	—	Eck Stadium; Wichita, KS	**L** 2–6				1,784	11–6	—	Stats; Recap
Mar. 17	6:30 pm	ESPN+	vs. TCU	—	Mitchell Park; Norman, OK	**L** 5–13				1,591	11–7	0–1	Stats; Recap
Mar. 18	4:00 pm	ESPN+	vs. TCU	—	Mitchell Park; Norman, OK	**W** 3–1				1,704	12–7	1–1	Stats; Recap
Mar. 19	2:00 pm	ESPN+	vs. TCU	—	Mitchell Park; Norman, OK	**W** 7–5				1,479	13–7	2–1	Stats; Recap
Mar. 21	6:30 pm	ESPN+	vs. Dallas Baptist*	—	Mitchell Park; Norman, OK	**L** 6–8				1,093	13–8	—	Stats; Recap
Mar. 24	6:00 pm	ESPN+	vs. Kansas State	—	Tointon Family; Manhattan, KS	**L** 1–7				1,389	13–9	2–2	Stats; Recap
Mar. 25	1:00 pm	ESPN+	vs. Kansas State	—	Tointon Family; Manhattan, KS	**L** 6–7				1,626	13–10	2–3	Stats; Recap
Mar. 26	1:00 pm	ESPN+	vs. Kansas State	—	Tointon Family; Manhattan, KS	**L** 7–8				1,337	13–11	2–4	Stats; Recap
Mar. 28	6:00 pm	—	vs. Wichita State*	—	Riverfront Stadium; Wichita, KS	**L** 7–8				2,094	13–12		Stats; Recap
Mar. 30	6:30 pm	ESPN+	vs. Stanford*	—	Mitchell Park; Norman, OK	**L** 11–23				1,434	13–13		Stats; Recap
Mar. 31	6:30 pm	ESPN+	vs. Stanford*	—	Mitchell Park; Norman, OK	**W** 2–0				1,669	14–13		Stats; Recap

April (10–7)
Date	Time (CT)	TV	Opponent	Rank	Stadium	Score	Win	Loss	Save	Attendance	Overall Record	Big 12 Record	Sources
Apr. 1	4:00 pm	ESPN+	vs. Stanford*	—	Mitchell Park; Norman, OK	**W** 6–5				2,031	15–13	—	Stats; Recap
Apr. 2	1:00 pm	ESPN+	vs. Stanford*	—	Mitchell Park; Norman, OK	**L** 5–16				1,604	15–14	—	Stats; Recap
Apr. 4	6:00 pm	—	vs. Oral Roberts*	—	J. L. Johnson Stadium; Tulsa, OK	**W** 12–2				1,941	16–14	—	Stats; Recap
Apr. 6	6:30 pm	ESPN+	vs. Baylor	—	Baylor Ballpark; Waco, TX	**L** 6–10				1,619	16–15	2—5	Stats; Recap
Apr. 7	6:30 pm	ESPN+	vs. Baylor	—	Baylor Ballpark; Waco, TX	**W** 6–3				1,835	17–15	3—5	Stats; Recap
Apr. 8	2:00 pm	ESPN+	vs. Baylor	—	Baylor Ballpark; Waco, TX	**L** 3–5				2,176	17–16	3—6	Stats; Recap
Apr. 11	6:30 pm	ESPN+	vs. Wichita State*	—	Mitchell Park; Norman, OK	**W** 8–1				1,751	18–16	—	Stats; Recap
Apr. 14	6:30 pm	ESPN+	vs. Texas Tech	—	Mitchell Park; Norman, OK	**L** 7–13				2,577	18–17	3—7	Stats; Recap
Apr. 15	4:00 pm	ESPN+	vs. Texas Tech	—	Mitchell Park; Norman, OK	**L** 5–9				3,074	18–18	3—8	Stats; Recap
Apr. 16	2:00 pm	ESPN+	vs. Texas Tech	—	Mitchell Park; Norman, OK	**W** 12–2				2,426	19–18	4—8	Stats; Recap
Bedlam Series
Apr. 18	6:00 pm	ESPN+	vs. Oklahoma State*	—	O'Brate Stadium; Stillwater, OK	**L** 8–19				6,769	19–19	–	Stats; Recap
Apr. 21	7:00 pm	LHN	vs. Texas	—	UFCU Disch–Falk Field; Austin, TX	**W** 2–1				7,156	20–19	5—8	Stats; Recap
Apr. 22	2:30 pm	LHN	vs. Texas	—	UFCU Disch–Falk Field; Austin, TX	**W** 9–6				7,345	21–19	6—8	Stats; Recap
Apr. 22	6:30 pm	LHN	vs. Texas	—	UFCU Disch–Falk Field; Austin, TX	**W** 6–4				7,887	22–19	7—8	Stats; Recap
Apr. 25	6:30 pm	ESPN+	vs. Oral Roberts*	—	Mitchell Park; Norman, OK	Canceled due to inclement weather.							
Apr. 28	12:30 pm	ESPN+	vs. Kansas	—	Mitchell Park; Norman, OK	**L** 2–8				501	22–20	7—9	Stats; Recap
Apr. 29	3:00 pm	ESPN+	vs. Kansas	—	Mitchell Park; Norman, OK	**W** 11–6				1,876	23–20	8—9	Stats; Recap
Apr. 30	2:00 pm	ESPN+	vs. Kansas	—	Mitchell Park; Norman, OK	**W** 7–4				1,894	24–20	9—9	Stats; Recap

May (6–4)
Date	Time (CT)	TV	Opponent	Rank	Stadium	Score	Win	Loss	Save	Attendance	Overall Record	Big 12 Record	Sources
May. 2	6:30 pm	—	vs. Dallas Baptist*	—	Horner Ballpark; Dallas, TX	**W** 10–7				1,452	25–20	—	Stats; Recap
May. 5	5:30 pm	ESPN+	vs. West Virginia	—	Monongalia County Ballpark; Morgantown, WV	**L** 3–9				3,411	25–21	9—10	Stats; Recap
May. 6	3:00 pm	ESPN+	vs. West Virginia	—	Monongalia County Ballpark; Morgantown, WV	**W** 6–3				4,387	26–21	10—10	Stats; Recap
May. 7	10:00 am	ESPN+	vs. West Virginia	—	Monongalia County Ballpark; Morgantown, WV	**L** 3–9				2,873	26–22	10—11	Stats; Recap
May. 12	8:00 pm	WCCTV	vs. Gonzaga*	—	Patterson BB Complex; Spokane, WA	**W** 5–2				1,196	27–22	—	Stats; Recap
May. 13	8:00 pm	WCCTV	vs. Gonzaga*	—	Patterson BB Complex; Spokane, WA	**W** 19–12				1,315	28–22	—	Stats; Recap
May. 14	5:00 pm	WCCTV	vs. Gonzaga*	—	Patterson BB Complex; Spokane, WA	**W** 9–1				884	29–22	—	Stats; Recap
May. 16	—	—	vs. UT Arlington*	—	Mitchell Park; Norman, OK	Mutually agreed to cancel.							
May. 18	6:30 pm	ESPN+	vs. Oklahoma State	—	Mitchell Park; Norman, OK	**L** 2–13				2,571	29–23	10—12	Stats; Recap
May. 19	6:30 pm	ESPN+	vs. Oklahoma State	—	Mitchell Park; Norman, OK	**W** 5–0				3,044	30–23	11—12	Stats; Recap
May. 20	4:00 pm	ESPN+	vs. Oklahoma State	—	Mitchell Park; Norman, OK	**L** 1–11				3,371	30–24	11—13	Stats; Recap

Postseason (1–2)

Big 12 Tournament (1–2)
Date	Time (CT)	TV	Opponent	Seed	Stadium	Score	Win	Loss	Save	Attend	Overall Record	Tourney Record	Sources
May. 24	4:00 pm	ESPN+	vs. Oklahoma State	—	Globe Life Field; Arlington, TX	**W** 9–5	**Hitt** **(6—1)**	Benge (2—2)	**Campbell** **(2)**	—	31–24	—	Stats; Recap
May. 25	7:30 pm	ESPNU	vs. Texas Tech	—	Globe Life Field; Arlington, TX	**L** 9–10	Sanders (3—1)	**Douthit** **(4—6)**	—	—	31–25	—	Stats; Recap
May. 26	6:30 pm	ESPN+	vs. Oklahoma State	—	Globe Life Field; Arlington, TX	**L** 3–8	Abram (8—2)	**Carsten** **(1—3)**	—	—	31–26	—	Stats; Recap

NCAA Tournament: Charlottesville Super Regional (1–2)
Date	Time (CT)	TV	Opponent	Seed	Stadium	Score	Win	Loss	Save	Attend	Overall Record	Tourney Record	Sources
Jun. 2	6:00 pm	ESPN2	vs. East Carolina	—	Disharoon Park; Charlottesville, VA	**L** 5–14	Yesavage (7–1)	**Carmichael** **(7–1)**	—	4,391	31–27	0–1	Stats; Recap
Jun. 3	11:00 am	ESPN	vs. Army	—	Disharoon Park; Charlottesville, VA	**W** 10–1	**Douthit** **(5–6)**	Ruggieri (9–2)	—	4,054	32–27	1–1	Stats; Recap
Jun. 4	12:00 pm	ESPN+	vs. East Carolina	—	Disharoon Park; Charlottesville, VA	**L** 5–8	Ginn (6–0)	**Hitt (6–2)**	—	3,985	32–28	1–2	Stats; Recap

* indicates a non-conference game.

== Statistics ==
Legend
GP	Games played	GS	Games started	AB	At-bats
H	Hits	Avg.	Batting average	2B	Doubles
3B	Triples	HR	Home runs	RBI	Runs batted in
IP	Innings pitched	W	Wins	L	Losses
ERA	Earned run average	SO	Strikeouts	BB	Base on balls
SV	Saves	SB	Stolen bases	High	Team high

=== Individual batting ===
A darker background denotes not meeting the minimum requirement of 2 PA/G and 75% of games played

Player	GP	AB	Avg.	H	2B	3B	HR	RBI	BB	SO	SB
Dakota Harris	46	186	.328	61	12	1	7	48	19	37	5
Bryce Madron	60	219	.320	70	15	3	12	51	61	36	15
Kendall Pettis	54	178	.309	55	6	3	1	24	36	35	17
Anthony Mackenzie	60	242	.306	74	9	1	6	41	39	53	21
Easton Carmichael	51	193	.306	59	8	4	6	48	13	44	4
Rocco Garza-Gongora	51	164	.293	48	6	1	3	27	15	44	4
John Spikerman	60	222	.270	60	14	1	3	33	49	53	27
Wallace Clark	47	139	.237	33	8	2	1	18	31	31	4
Jackson Nicklaus	59	197	.234	46	9	3	6	39	51	78	9
Diego Muniz	37	111	.270	30	6	0	1	17	15	24	4
Caden Powell	16	35	.257	9	4	0	0	3	2	14	0
Sebastian Orduno	38	93	.226	21	3	0	1	8	19	20	3
Patrick Engskov	11	10	.200	2	0	0	0	0	0	3	1
Mason Strong	8	8	.000	0	0	0	0	0	0	3	0
Kade Fletcher	3	1	.000	0	0	0	0	0	0	0	0

Source: 2023 Baseball Cumulative Statistics
