= Ryan Folmar =

American baseball coach and former catcher

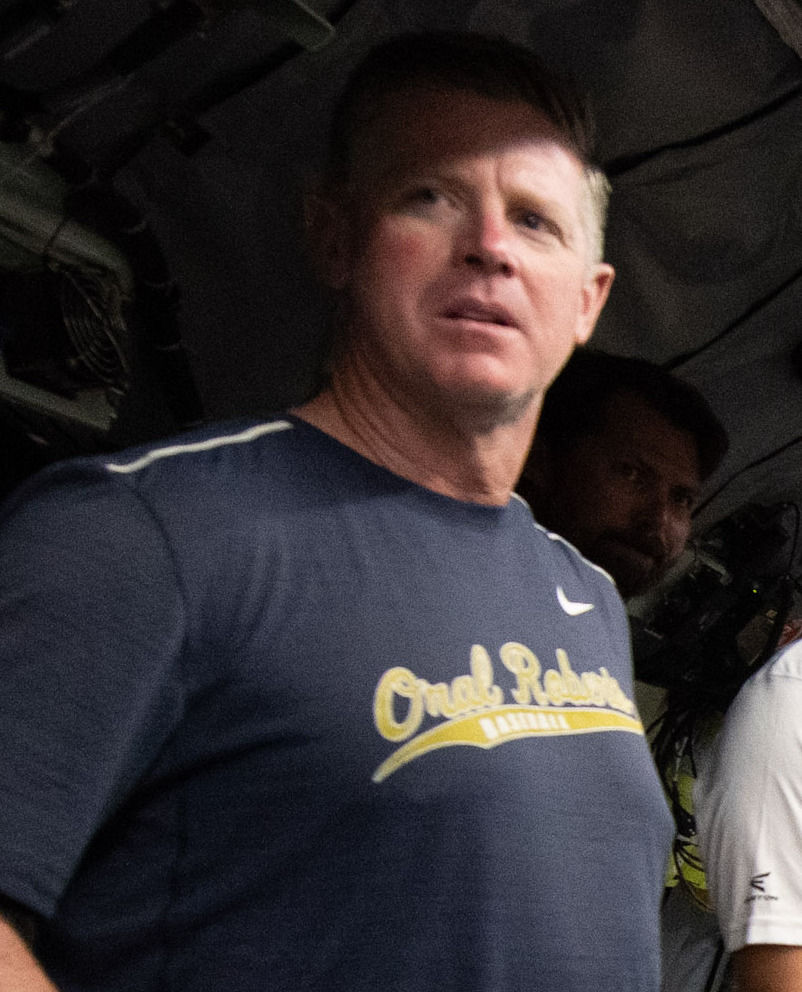
- Folmar in 2023

Current position
- Title: Head coach
- Team: Oral Roberts
- Conference: Summit League
- Record: 470–302–1 (.609)

Biographical details
- Born: November 8, 1974 (age 51); Hillsdale, Michigan, U.S.

Playing career
- 1994–1997: Oklahoma State
- 1997: Portland Rockies
- 1997: AZL Rockies
- 1998: Asheville Tourists
- Position: Catcher

Coaching career (HC unless noted)
- 2004–2012: Oral Roberts (assistant)
- 2013–present: Oral Roberts

Administrative career (AD unless noted)
- 1999–2003: Oklahoma State (Dir. of Operations)

Head coaching record
- Overall: 470–302–1 (.609)
- Tournaments: NCAA: 16–18

Accomplishments and honors

Championships
- NCAA Super Regional Champion (2023); NCAA Regional Champion (2023); 8× Summit League (2015–2018, 2021, 2023, 2025, 2026); 6× Summit League Tournament (2015–2018, 2022, 2023)

Awards
- NCBW Coach of the Year (2023); 8× Summit League Coach of the Year (2015–2018, 2021, 2023, 2025, 2026)

Ryan Folmar (born November 8, 1974) in an American baseball coach and former catcher. He is the current head baseball coach of the Oral Roberts Golden Eagles. He played college baseball at Oklahoma State from 1994 to 1997 for head coaches Gary Ward and Tom Holliday before playing professionally in the Colorado Rockies organization from 1997 to 1998.

== Playing career ==
Folmar was drafted out of Chambersburg Area Senior High School in Chambersburg, Pennsylvania in the 46th round of the 1993 Major League Baseball draft by the California Angels, but elected to attend Oklahoma State instead. After the 1994 season, he played collegiate summer baseball with the Cotuit Kettleers of the Cape Cod Baseball League. A four year starter with the Cowboys, he helped lead the team to the 1996 College World Series in his junior season. After completing his collegiate career, he played two seasons in the Colorado Rockies organization.

== Coaching career ==
He served as Director of Baseball Operations at Oklahoma State for five years, from 1999–2003 before accepting an assistant coach position at Oral Roberts. He worked with infielders and served as hitting coach for nine seasons and saw several players join the professional ranks. He was named to his first head coaching position with the Golden Eagles in July 2012.

== Head coaching record ==
Record table
Season	Team	Overall	Conference	Standing	Postseason
Oral Roberts Golden Eagles (Southland Conference) (2013–2014)
2013	Oral Roberts	25–32	16–11	3rd	
2014	Oral Roberts	30–26	15–15	9th	
Oral Roberts Golden Eagles (Summit League) (2015–present)
2015	Oral Roberts	41–16	25–5	1st	NCAA Regional
2016	Oral Roberts	38–21	22–8	1st	NCAA Regional
2017	Oral Roberts	43–16	25–4	1st	NCAA Regional
2018	Oral Roberts	38–20	24–6	1st	NCAA Regional
2019	Oral Roberts	29–26	17–12	3rd	Summit League tournament
2020	Oral Roberts	6–10	0–0		Season canceled due to COVID-19
2021	Oral Roberts	31–23	19–7	1st	Summit League tournament
2022	Oral Roberts	38–20	17–7	2nd	NCAA Regional
2023	Oral Roberts	52–14	23–1	1st	College World Series
2024	Oral Roberts	27–32–1	13–15–1	4th	NCAA Regional
2025	Oral Roberts	37–22	21–9	T–1st	Summit League tournament
2026	Oral Roberts	35–24	22–6	1st	Summit League tournament
Oral Roberts:		470–302–1	236–106–1		
Total:		470–302–1			
National champion Postseason invitational champion Conference regular season champion Conference regular season and conference tournament champion Division regular season champion Division regular season and conference tournament champion Conference tournament champion

== See also ==
- List of current NCAA Division I baseball coaches
