= 2023 NCAA Division I baseball tournament =

American college sports championship

- Season: 2023
- Teams: 64
- Finals site: Charles Schwab Field Omaha; Omaha, Nebraska
- Champions: LSU (7th title)
- Runner-up: Florida (13th CWS Appearance)
- Winning coach: Jay Johnson (1st title)
- MOP: Paul Skenes (LSU)
- Attendance: 39,294
- Television: ESPN; ESPN2; ESPNU; ACCN; SECN; LHN; ESPN+

The 2023 NCAA Division I baseball tournament was the 76th edition of the NCAA Division I Baseball Championship. The 64-team tournament began on Friday, June 2, as part of the 2023 NCAA Division I baseball season and ended with the 2023 Men's College World Series in Omaha, Nebraska, which began on June 16 and ended on June 26. LSU defeated Florida in the best-of-three final series to win their seventh national championship in program history and the 51st national title in all sports.

The 64 participating NCAA Division I college baseball teams were selected from an eligible 300 teams. 30 teams were awarded automatic bids as champions of their conferences, and 34 teams were selected at-large by the NCAA Division I Baseball Committee. Teams were then divided into sixteen regionals of four teams, each of which is conducted via a double-elimination tournament. Regional champions then faced each other in Super Regionals, a best-of-three-game series, to determine the eight participants in the Men's College World Series.

== Tournament procedure ==
A total of 64 teams entered the tournament, with 31 of them receiving an automatic bid by either winning their conference's tournament or by finishing in first place in their conference. The remaining 33 bids were at-large, with selections extended by the NCAA Selection Committee.

== National seeds ==
The sixteen national seeds were announced on the Selection Show on May 29. Teams in italics advanced to the Super Regionals. Teams in bold advanced to the 2023 Men's College World Series.

1. **Wake Forest**
2. **Florida**
3. Arkansas
4. Clemson
5. **LSU**
6. Vanderbilt
7. **Virginia**
8. **Stanford**
9. Miami (FL)
10. Coastal Carolina
11. Oklahoma State
12. Kentucky
13. Auburn
14. Indiana State
15. South Carolina
16. Alabama

One of the national seeds, Kentucky, faced serious logistical challenges due to multiple events scheduled in the area during the regional weekend:

- The Railbird Music Festival, headlined by country stars Tyler Childers and Zach Bryan, was held at The Red Mile, a harness racing track in Lexington.
- The Kentucky High School Athletic Association held its state baseball and softball tournaments, as well as its state championship meets in track and field, in Lexington. The softball and track events were held on the Kentucky campus; the early rounds of the baseball championship were played at a separate Lexington ballpark.
- The Great American Brass Band Festival, which typically draws more than 40,000 spectators, was held about 45 minutes' drive away in Danville.

The NCAA cleared Kentucky as a regional host due to the school's contingency plans. Three residence halls, all newer facilities with apartment-style accommodations located near the UK ballpark, were secured for use by participating teams. UK also secured hotel rooms an hour's drive away in Louisville for potential use. All participating teams, including Kentucky, were ultimately housed in the residence halls.

== Schedule and venues ==
On May 28, the NCAA Division I Baseball Committee announced the sixteen regional host sites.

Regionals

- June 2–5
  - Plainsman Park, Auburn, Alabama (Host: Auburn University)
  - Alex Box Stadium, Baton Rouge, Louisiana (Host: Louisiana State University)
  - Disharoon Park, Charlottesville, Virginia (Host: University of Virginia)
  - Doug Kingsmore Stadium, Clemson, South Carolina (Host: Clemson University)
  - Founders Park, Columbia, South Carolina (Host: University of South Carolina)
  - Springs Brooks Stadium, Conway, South Carolina (Host: Coastal Carolina University)
  - Alex Rodriguez Park, Coral Gables, Florida (Host: University of Miami)
  - Baum–Walker Stadium, Fayetteville, Arkansas (Host: University of Arkansas)
  - Condron Ballpark, Gainesville, Florida (Host: University of Florida)
  - Kentucky Proud Park, Lexington, Kentucky (Host: University of Kentucky)
  - Hawkins Field, Nashville, Tennessee (Host: Vanderbilt University)
  - Sunken Diamond, Stanford, California (Host: Stanford University)
  - O'Brate Stadium, Stillwater, Oklahoma (Host: Oklahoma State University)
  - Bob Warn Field, Terre Haute, Indiana (Host: Indiana State University)
  - Sewell–Thomas Stadium, Tuscaloosa, Alabama (Host: University of Alabama)
  - David F. Couch Ballpark, Winston-Salem, North Carolina (Host: Wake Forest University)

Super Regionals

- June 9–11
  - Disharoon Park, Charlottesville, Virginia (Host: University of Virginia)
  - PK Park, Eugene, Oregon (Host: University of Oregon)
  - Lupton Stadium, Fort Worth, Texas (Host: Texas Christian University)
  - Condron Ballpark, Gainesville, Florida (Host: University of Florida)
- June 10–12
  - Alex Box Stadium, Baton Rouge, Louisiana (Host: Louisiana State University)
  - Pete Taylor Park, Hattiesburg, Mississippi (Host: University of Southern Mississippi)
  - Sunken Diamond, Stanford, California (Host: Stanford University)
  - David F. Couch Ballpark, Winston-Salem, North Carolina (Host: Wake Forest University)

Men's College World Series

- June 16–26
  - Charles Schwab Field Omaha, Omaha, Nebraska, (Host: Creighton University)

== Bids ==
=== Automatic bids ===
School	Conference	Record (Conf)	Berth	Last NCAA Appearance
Maine	America East	32–19 (19–5)	Tournament	2011 (Chapel Hill Regional)
Tulane	American	19–40 (8–16)	Tournament	2016 (Oxford Regional)
Lipscomb	ASUN	36–24 (23–7)	Tournament	2015 (Louisville Regional)
Clemson	ACC	43–17 (20–10)	Tournament	2019 (Oxford Regional)
George Mason	Atlantic 10	34–25 (13–10)	Tournament	2014 (Houston Regional)
TCU	Big 12	37–22 (13–11)	Tournament	2022 (College Station Super Regional)
Xavier	Big East	37–23 (14–7)	Tournament	2017 (Louisville Regional)
Campbell	Big South	44–13 (22–5)	Tournament	2022 (Knoxville Regional)
Maryland	Big Ten	41–19 (17–7)	Tournament	2022 (College Park Regional)
Cal State Fullerton	Big West	31–22 (20–10)	Regular season	2018 (Fullerton Super Regional)
UNC Wilmington	Colonial	34–21 (20–8)	Tournament	2019 (Chapel Hill Regional)
Charlotte	Conference USA	30–26 (17–12)	Tournament	2021 (Greenville Regional)
Wright State	Horizon	39–21 (22–8)	Tournament	2022 (Blacksburg Regional)
Penn	Ivy League	32–14 (16–5)	Tournament	1995 (Midwest II Regional)
Rider	Metro Atlantic	35–19 (14–7)	Tournament	2021 (Ruston Regional)
Ball State	Mid-American	36–21 (19–11)	Tournament	2006 (Lexington Regional)
Indiana State	Missouri Valley	42–15 (24–3)	Tournament	2021 (Nashville Regional)
San Jose State	Mountain West	31–25 (18–11)	Tournament	2002 (Palo Alto Regional)
Central Connecticut	Northeast	36–12 (25–5)	Tournament	2021 (Eugene Regional)
Eastern Illinois	Ohio Valley	38–19 (13–11)	Tournament	2008 (Lincoln Regional)
Oregon	Pac-12	37–20 (16–14)	Tournament	2022 (Louisville Regional)
Army	Patriot	38–16 (21–4)	Tournament	2022 (Hattiesburg Regional)
Vanderbilt	SEC	41–18 (19–11)	Tournament	2022 (Corvallis Regional)
Samford	Southern	36–23 (15–6)	Tournament	2021 (Starkville Regional)
Nicholls	Southland	34–22 (15–9)	Tournament	1998 (South II Regional)
Florida A&M	Southwestern Athletic	29–28 (18–12)	Tournament	2015 (Gainesville Regional)
Oral Roberts	Summit	46–11 (23–1)	Tournament	2022 (College Station Regional)
Southern Miss	Sun Belt	41–17 (22–8)	Tournament	2022 (Hattiesburg Super Regional)
Santa Clara	West Coast	35–18 (17–10)	Tournament	1997 (West Regional)
Sam Houston	Western Athletic	38–23 (22–8)	Tournament	2017 (Tallahassee Super Regional)

=== By conference ===
Conference	Total	Schools
SEC	10	Alabama, Arkansas, Auburn, Florida, Kentucky, LSU, South Carolina, Tennessee, Texas A&M, Vanderbilt
ACC	8	Boston College, Clemson, Duke, Miami (FL), North Carolina, NC State, Virginia, Wake Forest
Big 12	6	Oklahoma, Oklahoma State, Texas, TCU, Texas Tech, West Virginia
Pac-12	5	Arizona, Oregon, Oregon State, Stanford, Washington
Sun Belt	4	Coastal Carolina, Louisiana, Southern Miss, Troy
Big Ten	3	Indiana, Iowa, Maryland
American	2	East Carolina, Tulane
Big East	2	UConn, Xavier
Colonial	2	Northeastern, UNC Wilmington
Conference USA	2	Charlotte, Dallas Baptist
ASUN	1	Lipscomb
America East	1	Maine
Atlantic 10	1	George Mason
Big South	1	Campbell
Big West	1	Cal State Fullerton
Horizon	1	Wright State
Ivy League	1	Penn
Metro Atlantic	1	Rider
Mid-American	1	Ball State
Missouri Valley	1	Indiana State
Mountain West	1	San Jose State
Northeast	1	Central Connecticut
Ohio Valley	1	Eastern Illinois
Patriot	1	Army
Southern	1	Samford
Southland	1	Nicholls
Southwestern Athletic	1	Florida A&M
Summit	1	Oral Roberts
Western Athletic	1	Sam Houston
West Coast	1	Santa Clara

== Regionals and Super Regionals ==
Bold indicates winner. Seeds for regional tournaments indicate seeds within regional. Seeds for super regional tournaments indicate national seeds only. Game times are listed in ET.

=== Eugene Super Regional ===
Hosted by Oregon at PK Park

Regional	Regional
1	**Vanderbilt**	**12**
4	Eastern Illinois	2
1	Vanderbilt	7
2	**Oregon**	**8**
3	Xavier	4
2	**Oregon**	**5**
Nashville Regional – Hawkins Field
4	Eastern Illinois	0
3	**Xavier**	**7**
3	**Xavier**	**2**
1	Vanderbilt	1
1	Oklahoma State	4
4	**Oral Roberts**	**6**
4	**Oral Roberts**	**15**
3	Washington	12
3	**Washington**	**9**
2	Dallas Baptist	5
Stillwater Regional – O'Brate Stadium
1	Oklahoma State	4
2	**Dallas Baptist**	**18**
2	**Dallas Baptist**	**9**
3	Washington	1

Regional Final
2	**Oregon**	**11**	–
3	Xavier	2	–
4	**Oral Roberts**	**6**	–
2	Dallas Baptist	5	–

Super Regional; June 9–11
Oregon	**9**	7	6
**Oral Roberts**	8	**8**	**11**

=== Fort Worth Super Regional ===
Hosted by TCU at Lupton Stadium due to logistical issues presented because of Terre Haute hosting the Special Olympics Indiana Summer Games

Regional	Regional
1	**Arkansas**	**13**
4	Santa Clara	6
1	Arkansas	5
2	**TCU**	**20**
3	Arizona	4
2	**TCU**	**12**
Fayetteville Regional – Baum–Walker Stadium
4	**Santa Clara**	**9**
3	Arizona	3
4	Santa Clara	4
1	**Arkansas**	**6**
1	**Indiana State**	**6**
4	Wright State	5
1	**Indiana State**	**7**
2	Iowa	4
3	North Carolina	4
2	**Iowa**	**5**
Terre Haute Regional – Bob Warn Field at Sycamore Stadium
4	Wright State	0
3	**North Carolina**	**5**
3	North Carolina	5
2	**Iowa**	**6**^{13}

Regional Final
2	**TCU**	**12**	–
1	Arkansas	4	–
1	**Indiana State**	**11**	–
2	Iowa	8	–

Super Regional; June 9–11
**TCU**	**4**	**6**	–
14	Indiana State	1	4	–

=== Charlottesville Super Regional ===
Regional	Regional
1	**Virginia**	**15**
4	Army	1
1	**Virginia**	**2**
2	East Carolina	1
3	Oklahoma	5
2	**East Carolina**	**14**
Charlottesville Regional – Disharoon Park
4	Army	1
3	**Oklahoma**	**10**
3	Oklahoma	5
2	**East Carolina**	**8**
1	Coastal Carolina	10
4	**Rider**	**11**^{10}
4	Rider	1
2	**Duke**	**2**
3	UNC Wilmington	3
2	**Duke**	**12**
Conway Regional – Springs Brooks Stadium
1	**Coastal Carolina**	**12**
3	UNC Wilmington	2
1	**Coastal Carolina**	**13**
4	Rider	5

Regional Final
1	**Virginia**	**8**	–
2	East Carolina	3	–
2	**Duke**	6	**12**
1	Coastal Carolina	**8**	3

Super Regional; June 9–11
7	**Virginia**	4	**14**	**12**
Duke	**5**	4	2

=== Gainesville Super Regional ===
Regional	Regional
1	**Florida**	**3**
4	Florida A&M	0
1	Florida	4
3	**Texas Tech**	**5**
3	**Texas Tech**	**3**
2	UConn	2
Gainesville Regional – Condron Ballpark
4	Florida A&M	6
2	**UConn**	**9**
2	UConn	2
1	**Florida**	**8**
1	**South Carolina**	**19**
4	Central Connecticut	1
1	**South Carolina**	**6**
3	NC State	3
3	**NC State**	**5**
2	Campbell	1
Columbia Regional – Founders Park
4	Central Connecticut	5
2	**Campbell**	**10**
2	**Campbell**	**11**
3	NC State	1

Regional Final
3	Texas Tech	1	0
1	**Florida**	**7**	**6**
1	**South Carolina**	**16**	–
2	Campbell	7	–

Super Regional; June 9–11
2	**Florida**	**5**	**4**	–
15	South Carolina	4	0	–

=== Winston-Salem Super Regional ===
Regional	Regional
1	**Wake Forest**	**12**
4	George Mason	0
1	**Wake Forest**	**21**
2	Maryland	6
3	Northeastern	2
2	**Maryland**	**7**
Winston-Salem Regional – David F. Couch Ballpark
4	**George Mason**	**11**
3	Northeastern	3
4	**George Mason**	**11**
2	Maryland	10
1	**Alabama**	**4**
4	Nicholls	3
1	**Alabama**	**11**
3	Troy	8
3	**Troy**	**11**
2	Boston College	10
Tuscaloosa Regional – Sewell–Thomas Stadium
4	Nicholls	6
2	**Boston College**	**14**
2	**Boston College**	**4**
3	Troy	1

Regional Final
1	**Wake Forest**	**15**	–
4	George Mason	1	–
1	**Alabama**	**8**	–
2	Boston College	0	–

Super Regional; June 10–12
1	**Wake Forest**	**5**	**22**	–
16	Alabama	4	5	–

=== Stanford Super Regional ===
Regional	Regional
1	**Stanford**	**13**
4	San Jose State	2
1	Stanford	5
2	**Texas A&M**	**8**
3	Cal State Fullerton	7
2	**Texas A&M**	**12**
Stanford Regional – Sunken Diamond
4	San Jose State	5
3	**Cal State Fullerton**	**9**
3	Cal State Fullerton	5
1	**Stanford**	**6**
1	**Miami (FL)**	**9**
4	Maine	1
1	Miami (FL)	1
2	**Texas**	**4**
3	Louisiana	2
2	**Texas**	**4**
Coral Gables Regional – Alex Rodriguez Park at Mark Light Field
4	Maine	10
3	**Louisiana**	**19**
3	Louisiana	5
1	**Miami (FL)**	**8**

Regional Final
2	Texas A&M	5	1
1	**Stanford**	**13**	**7**
2	**Texas**	**10**	–
1	Miami (FL)	6	–

Super Regional; June 10–12
8	**Stanford**	5	**8**	**7**
Texas	**7**	3	6

=== Baton Rouge Super Regional ===
Regional	Regional
1	**LSU**	**7**
4	Tulane	2
1	**LSU**	**6**
2	Oregon State	5
3	Sam Houston	2
2	**Oregon State**	**18**
Baton Rouge Regional – Alex Box Stadium
4	Tulane	2
3	**Sam Houston**	**10**
3	Sam Houston	1
2	**Oregon State**	**3**
1	**Kentucky**	**4**
4	Ball State	0
1	Kentucky	3
3	**Indiana**	**5**
3	**Indiana**	**12**
2	West Virginia	6
Lexington Regional – Kentucky Proud Park
4	Ball State	5
2	**West Virginia**	**13**
2	West Virginia	0
1	**Kentucky**	**10**

Regional Final
1	**LSU**	**13**	–
2	Oregon State	7	–
3	Indiana	6	2
1	**Kentucky**	**16**	**4**

Super Regional; June 10–12
5	**LSU**	**14**	**8**	–
12	Kentucky	0	3	–

=== Hattiesburg Super Regional ===
Hosted by Southern Miss at Pete Taylor Park

Regional	Regional
1	**Clemson**	**12**
4	Lipscomb	5
1	Clemson	5
2	**Tennessee**	**6**^{14}
3	Charlotte	1
2	**Tennessee**	**8**
Clemson Regional – Doug Kingsmore Stadium
4	Lipscomb	2
3	**Charlotte**	**9**
3	**Charlotte**	**3**
1	Clemson	2
1	Auburn	3
4	**Penn**	**6**^{11}
4	**Penn**	**5**
3	Samford	4
3	**Samford**	**4**
2	Southern Miss	2^{10}
Auburn Regional – Plainsman Park
1	Auburn	2
2	**Southern Miss**	**7**
2	**Southern Miss**	**9**
3	Samford	4

Regional Final
2	**Tennessee**	**9**	–
3	Charlotte	2	–
4	Penn	2	7
2	**Southern Miss**	**11**	**11**

Super Regional; June 10–12
**Tennessee**	3	**8**	**5**
Southern Miss	**5**	4	0

== Men's College World Series ==
The Men's College World Series was held at Charles Schwab Field in Omaha, Nebraska.

=== Participants ===
School	Conference	Record (Conf)	Head Coach	Super Regional	Previous MCWS Appearances	MCWS Best Finish	MCWS W–L Record
LSU	SEC	48–15 (19–10)	Jay Johnson	Baton Rouge	18 (last: 2017)	1st (1991, 1993, 1996, 1997, 2000, 2009)	40–27
Florida	SEC	50–15 (20–10)	Kevin O'Sullivan	Gainesville	12 (last: 2018)	1st (2017)	21–24
Virginia	ACC	50–13 (19–11)	Brian O'Connor	Charlottesville	5 (last: 2021)	1st (2015)	13–10
Wake Forest	ACC	52–10 (22–7)	Tom Walter	Winston-Salem	2 (last: 1955)	1st (1955)	7–3
Stanford	Pac-12	44–18 (23–7)	David Esquer	Stanford	18 (last: 2022)	1st (1987, 1988)	41–33
Tennessee	SEC	43–20 (16–14)	Tony Vitello	Hattiesburg	5 (last: 2021)	2nd (1951)	8–10
TCU	Big 12	42–22 (13–11)	Kirk Saarloos	Fort Worth	5 (last: 2017)	3rd (2010, 2015, 2016, 2017)	11–10
Oral Roberts	Summit League	51–12 (23–1)	Ryan Folmar	Eugene	1 (last: 1978)	5th (1978)	1–2

=== Bracket ===
Sources: Seeds listed below indicate national seeds only

First round	Second round
TCU	5
Oral Roberts	6
Oral Roberts	4
2	Florida	5
7	Virginia	5
2	Florida	6
Bracket 1
TCU	4
7	Virginia	3
TCU	6
Oral Roberts	1
1	Wake Forest	3
8	Stanford	2
1	Wake Forest	3
5	LSU	2
5	LSU	6
Tennessee	3
Bracket 2
8	Stanford	4
Tennessee	6
Tennessee	0
5	LSU	5

Semifinals
2	Florida	3	–
TCU	2	–
1	Wake Forest	2	0
5	LSU	5	2^{11}

Finals
2	Florida	3	24	4
5	LSU	4^{11}	4	18

=== Game results ===
==== Bracket 1 ====
June 16, 2023; 1:00 pm CDT (UTC-5); Game 1	Oral Roberts	6–5	TCU	Charles Schwab Field Omaha; Attendance: 24,134; Umpires: HP: Jeff Head, 1B: Angel Campos, 2B: Ramon Armenderiz, 3B: Brandon Cooper
June 16, 2023; 1:00 pm CDT (UTC-5); Game 1	WP: Cade Denton (2–1)	Box Score	LP: Luke Savage (5–3)	Charles Schwab Field Omaha; Attendance: 24,134; Umpires: HP: Jeff Head, 1B: Angel Campos, 2B: Ramon Armenderiz, 3B: Brandon Cooper
June 16, 2023; 1:00 pm CDT (UTC-5); Game 1	HR: Mac McCroskey (14)	Box Score	HR: Cole Fontenelle (14)	Charles Schwab Field Omaha; Attendance: 24,134; Umpires: HP: Jeff Head, 1B: Angel Campos, 2B: Ramon Armenderiz, 3B: Brandon Cooper

June 16, 2023; 6:00 pm CDT (UTC-5); Game 2	No. 7 Virginia	5–6	No. 2 Florida	Charles Schwab Field Omaha; Attendance: 24,801; Umpires: HP: Billy Van Raaphorst, 1B: David Savage, 2B: Travis Reininger, 3B: Casey Moser
June 16, 2023; 6:00 pm CDT (UTC-5); Game 2	LP: Jake Berry (0–5)	Box Score	WP: Brandon Neely (1–2)	Charles Schwab Field Omaha; Attendance: 24,801; Umpires: HP: Billy Van Raaphorst, 1B: David Savage, 2B: Travis Reininger, 3B: Casey Moser
June 16, 2023; 6:00 pm CDT (UTC-5); Game 2		Box Score	HR: Wyatt Langford (19), BT Riopelle (17), Ty Evans (5)	Charles Schwab Field Omaha; Attendance: 24,801; Umpires: HP: Billy Van Raaphorst, 1B: David Savage, 2B: Travis Reininger, 3B: Casey Moser

June 18, 2023; 1:00 pm CDT (UTC-5); Game 5	TCU	4–3	No. 7 Virginia	Charles Schwab Field Omaha; Attendance: 24,479; Umpires: HP: Ramon Armenderiz, 1B: Brandon Cooper, 2B: Jeff Head, 3B: Angel Campos
June 18, 2023; 1:00 pm CDT (UTC-5); Game 5	WP: Garrett Wright (3–2); Sv: Ben Abeldt (2)	Box Score	LP: Connelly Early (11–3)	Charles Schwab Field Omaha; Attendance: 24,479; Umpires: HP: Ramon Armenderiz, 1B: Brandon Cooper, 2B: Jeff Head, 3B: Angel Campos
June 18, 2023; 1:00 pm CDT (UTC-5); Game 5		Box Score	HR: Ethan Anderson (15)	Charles Schwab Field Omaha; Attendance: 24,479; Umpires: HP: Ramon Armenderiz, 1B: Brandon Cooper, 2B: Jeff Head, 3B: Angel Campos

June 18, 2023; 6:00 pm CDT (UTC-5); Game 6	Oral Roberts	4–5	No. 2 Florida	Charles Schwab Field Omaha; Attendance: 24,841; Umpires: HP: Travis Reininger, 1B: Casey Moser, 2B: Billy Van Raaphorst, 3B: David Savage
June 18, 2023; 6:00 pm CDT (UTC-5); Game 6	LP: Harley Gollert (10–2)	Box Score	WP: Hurston Waldrep (10–3); Sv: Cade Fisher (2)	Charles Schwab Field Omaha; Attendance: 24,841; Umpires: HP: Travis Reininger, 1B: Casey Moser, 2B: Billy Van Raaphorst, 3B: David Savage
June 18, 2023; 6:00 pm CDT (UTC-5); Game 6	HR: Justin Quinn (8), Matt Hogan (19)	Box Score	HR: Ty Evans (6), Josh Rivera (18), Luke Heyman (12)	Charles Schwab Field Omaha; Attendance: 24,841; Umpires: HP: Travis Reininger, 1B: Casey Moser, 2B: Billy Van Raaphorst, 3B: David Savage

June 20, 2023; 1:00 pm CDT (UTC-5); Game 9	TCU	6–1	Oral Roberts	Charles Schwab Field Omaha; Attendance: 23,496; Umpires: HP: Angel Campos, 1B: Ramon Armenderiz, 2B: Billy Van Raaphorst, 3B: Brandon Cooper
June 20, 2023; 1:00 pm CDT (UTC-5); Game 9	WP: Luke Savage (6–4)	Box Score	LP: Brooks Fowler (9–2)	Charles Schwab Field Omaha; Attendance: 23,496; Umpires: HP: Angel Campos, 1B: Ramon Armenderiz, 2B: Billy Van Raaphorst, 3B: Brandon Cooper

June 21, 2023; 1:00 pm CDT (UTC-5); Game 11	No. 2 Florida	3–2	TCU	Charles Schwab Field Omaha; Attendance: 23,889; Umpires: HP: Jeff Head, 1B: Casey Moser, 2B: Travis Reininger, 3B: David Savage
June 21, 2023; 1:00 pm CDT (UTC-5); Game 11	WP: Brandon Neely (2–2)	Box Score	LP: Ben Abeldt (3–4)	Charles Schwab Field Omaha; Attendance: 23,889; Umpires: HP: Jeff Head, 1B: Casey Moser, 2B: Travis Reininger, 3B: David Savage
June 21, 2023; 1:00 pm CDT (UTC-5); Game 11	HR: Josh Rivera (19)	Box Score		Charles Schwab Field Omaha; Attendance: 23,889; Umpires: HP: Jeff Head, 1B: Casey Moser, 2B: Travis Reininger, 3B: David Savage

==== Bracket 2 ====
June 17, 2023; 1:00 pm CDT (UTC-5); Game 3	No. 8 Stanford	2–3	No. 1 Wake Forest	Charles Schwab Field Omaha; Attendance: 23,943; Umpires: HP: David Savage, 1B: Travis Reininger, 2B: Casey Moser, 3B: Billy Van Raaphorst
June 17, 2023; 1:00 pm CDT (UTC-5); Game 3	LP: Ryan Bruno (2–2)	Box Score	WP: Seth Keener (8–1); Sv: Camden Minacci (13)	Charles Schwab Field Omaha; Attendance: 23,943; Umpires: HP: David Savage, 1B: Travis Reininger, 2B: Casey Moser, 3B: Billy Van Raaphorst
June 17, 2023; 1:00 pm CDT (UTC-5); Game 3		Box Score	HR: Brock Wilkin (31)	Charles Schwab Field Omaha; Attendance: 23,943; Umpires: HP: David Savage, 1B: Travis Reininger, 2B: Casey Moser, 3B: Billy Van Raaphorst

June 17, 2023; 6:00 pm CDT (UTC-5); Game 4	Tennessee	3–6	No. 5 LSU	Charles Schwab Field Omaha; Attendance: 25,010; Umpires: HP: Angel Campos, 1B: Ramon Armenderiz, 2B: Brandon Cooper, 3B: Jeff Head
June 17, 2023; 6:00 pm CDT (UTC-5); Game 4	LP: Andrew Lindsey (3–4)	Box Score	WP: Paul Skenes (13–2); Sv: Riley Cooper (1)	Charles Schwab Field Omaha; Attendance: 25,010; Umpires: HP: Angel Campos, 1B: Ramon Armenderiz, 2B: Brandon Cooper, 3B: Jeff Head
June 17, 2023; 6:00 pm CDT (UTC-5); Game 4	HR: Hunter Ensley (7)	Box Score	HR: Gavin Dugas (11)	Charles Schwab Field Omaha; Attendance: 25,010; Umpires: HP: Angel Campos, 1B: Ramon Armenderiz, 2B: Brandon Cooper, 3B: Jeff Head

June 19, 2023; 1:00 pm CDT (UTC-5); Game 7	No. 8 Stanford	4–6	Tennessee	Charles Schwab Field Omaha; Attendance: 23,886; Umpires: HP: Brandon Cooper, 1B: Jeff Head, 2B: Angel Campos, 3B: Ramon Armenderiz
June 19, 2023; 1:00 pm CDT (UTC-5); Game 7	LP: Matt Scott (5–5)	Box Score	WP: Chase Burns (5–3)	Charles Schwab Field Omaha; Attendance: 23,886; Umpires: HP: Brandon Cooper, 1B: Jeff Head, 2B: Angel Campos, 3B: Ramon Armenderiz

June 19, 2023; 6:00 pm CDT (UTC-5); Game 8	No. 1 Wake Forest	3–2	No. 5 LSU	Charles Schwab Field Omaha; Attendance: 24,958; Umpires: HP: Casey Moser, 1B: Billy Van Raaphorst, 2B: David Savage, 3B: Travis Reininger
June 19, 2023; 6:00 pm CDT (UTC-5); Game 8	WP: Camden Minacci (1–1)	Box Score	LP: Thatcher Hurd (6–3)	Charles Schwab Field Omaha; Attendance: 24,958; Umpires: HP: Casey Moser, 1B: Billy Van Raaphorst, 2B: David Savage, 3B: Travis Reininger

June 20, 2023; 6:00 pm CDT (UTC-5); Game 10	Tennessee	0–5	No. 5 LSU	Charles Schwab Field Omaha; Attendance: 24,874; Umpires: HP: David Savage, 1B: Travis Reininger, 2B: Jeff Head, 3B: Casey Moser
June 20, 2023; 6:00 pm CDT (UTC-5); Game 10	LP: Drew Beam (12–5)	Box Score	WP: Nate Ackenhausen (3–0); Sv: Riley Cooper (2)	Charles Schwab Field Omaha; Attendance: 24,874; Umpires: HP: David Savage, 1B: Travis Reininger, 2B: Jeff Head, 3B: Casey Moser
June 20, 2023; 6:00 pm CDT (UTC-5); Game 10		Box Score	HR: Dylan Crews (18)	Charles Schwab Field Omaha; Attendance: 24,874; Umpires: HP: David Savage, 1B: Travis Reininger, 2B: Jeff Head, 3B: Casey Moser

June 21, 2023; 6:00 pm CDT (UTC-5); Game 12	No. 1 Wake Forest	2–5	No. 5 LSU	Charles Schwab Field Omaha; Attendance: 25,214; Umpires: HP: Billy Van Raaphorst, 1B: Brandon Cooper, 2B: Ramon Armenderiz, 3B: Angel Campos
June 21, 2023; 6:00 pm CDT (UTC-5); Game 12	LP: Seth Keener (8–2)	Box Score	WP: Griffin Herring (5–2); Sv: Riley Cooper (3)	Charles Schwab Field Omaha; Attendance: 25,214; Umpires: HP: Billy Van Raaphorst, 1B: Brandon Cooper, 2B: Ramon Armenderiz, 3B: Angel Campos
June 21, 2023; 6:00 pm CDT (UTC-5); Game 12		Box Score	HR: Cade Beloso (15)	Charles Schwab Field Omaha; Attendance: 25,214; Umpires: HP: Billy Van Raaphorst, 1B: Brandon Cooper, 2B: Ramon Armenderiz, 3B: Angel Campos

June 22, 2023; 6:00 pm CDT (UTC-5); Game 13	No. 1 Wake Forest	0–2 (F/11)	No. 5 LSU	Charles Schwab Field Omaha; Attendance: 23,993; Umpires: HP: Travis Reininger, 1B: Jeff Head, 2B: David Savage, 3B: Casey Moser
June 22, 2023; 6:00 pm CDT (UTC-5); Game 13	LP: Michael Massey (3–1)	Box Score	WP: Thatcher Hurd (7–3)	Charles Schwab Field Omaha; Attendance: 23,993; Umpires: HP: Travis Reininger, 1B: Jeff Head, 2B: David Savage, 3B: Casey Moser
June 22, 2023; 6:00 pm CDT (UTC-5); Game 13		Box Score	HR: Tommy White (23)	Charles Schwab Field Omaha; Attendance: 23,993; Umpires: HP: Travis Reininger, 1B: Jeff Head, 2B: David Savage, 3B: Casey Moser

==== Finals ====
===== Game 1 =====
June 24, 2023 6:00 p.m. (CDT) at Charles Schwab Field Omaha in Omaha, Nebraska
Team	1	2	3	4	5	6	7	8	9	10	11	R	H	E
LSU	1	0	1	0	0	0	0	1	0	0	1	4	11	0
Florida	0	0	1	0	1	1	0	0	0	0	0	3	6	1
WP: Riley Cooper (5–3) LP: Brandon Neely (2–3); Home runs: LSU: Cade Beloso (16), Gavin Dugas (17), Tommy White (24); FLA: BT Riopelle (18); Attendance: 25,258; Box Score

===== Game 2 =====
June 25, 2023 2:00 p.m. (CDT) at Charles Schwab Field Omaha in Omaha, Nebraska
Team	1	2	3	4	5	6	7	8	9	R	H	E
Florida	0	1	6	1	0	5	2	4	5	24	23	1
LSU	1	2	0	0	0	0	0	0	1	4	7	5
WP: Blake Purnell (2–0) LP: Nate Ackenhausen (3–1) Sv: Nick Ficarrotta (2); Home runs: FLA: Ty Evans 2 (8), Wyatt Langford (20), Jac Caglianone 2 (33), BT Riopelle (19); LSU: Brayden Jobert (13); Attendance: 25,292; Box Score

===== Game 3 =====
June 26, 2023 6:00 p.m. (CDT) at Charles Schwab Field Omaha in Omaha, Nebraska
Team	1	2	3	4	5	6	7	8	9	R	H	E
LSU	0	6	0	4	0	0	1	3	4	18	24	1
Florida	2	0	0	0	0	0	1	1	0	4	5	0
WP: Thatcher Hurd (8–3) LP: Jac Caglianone (7–4); Home runs: LSU: Josh Pearson (4), Brayden Jobert (14); FLA: Wyatt Langford (21), Ty Evans (9), Cade Kurland (17); Attendance: 24,878; Box Score

== All-Tournament Team ==
The following players were members of the Men's College World Series All-Tournament Team.

Position	Player	School
P	Paul Skenes (MOP)	LSU
P	Ty Floyd	LSU
C	BT Riopelle	Florida
1B	Tre' Morgan	LSU
2B	Gavin Dugas	LSU
3B	Tommy White	LSU
SS	Josh Rivera	Florida
OF	Dylan Crews	LSU
OF	Ty Evans	Florida
OF	Wyatt Langford	Florida
DH	Cade Beloso	LSU

== Final standings ==
Seeds listed below indicate national seeds only

Place	School	Record
1st	No. 5 LSU	11–2
2nd	No. 2 Florida	10–3
3rd	No. 1 Wake Forest	7–2
3rd	TCU	7–2
5th	Oral Roberts	6–3
5th	Tennessee	6–3
7th	No. 8 Stanford	6–4
7th	No. 7 Virginia	5–3
9th	No. 16 Alabama	3–2
9th	Duke	4–3
9th	No. 14 Indiana State	3–2
9th	No. 12 Kentucky	4–2
9th	Oregon	4–2
9th	No. 15 South Carolina	3–2
9th	Southern Miss	5–3
9th	Texas	4–2
17th	No. 3 Arkansas	2–2
17th	Boston College	2–2
17th	Campbell	2–2
17th	Charlotte	2–2
17th	No. 10 Coastal Carolina	3–2
17th	Dallas Baptist	2–2
17th	East Carolina	2–2
17th	George Mason	2–2
17th	Indiana	2–2
17th	Iowa	2–2
17th	No. 9 Miami (FL)	2–2
17th	Oregon State	2–2
17th	Penn	2–2
17th	Texas A&M	2–2
17th	Texas Tech	2–2
17th	Xavier	2–2
33rd
33rd	Cal State Fullerton	1–2
33rd	No. 4 Clemson	1–2
33rd	Louisiana	1–2
33rd	Maryland	1–2
33rd	North Carolina	1–2
33rd	NC State	1–2
33rd	Oklahoma	1–2
33rd	Rider	1–2
33rd	Samford	1–2
33rd	Sam Houston	1–2
33rd	Santa Clara	1–2
33rd	Troy	1–2
33rd	UConn	1–2
33rd	No. 6 Vanderbilt	1–2
33rd	Washington	1–2
33rd	West Virginia	1–2
49th	Arizona	0–2
49th	Army	0–2
49th	No. 13 Auburn	0-2
49th	Ball State	0–2
49th	Central Connecticut	0–2
49th	Eastern Illinois	0–2
49th	Florida A&M	0–2
49th	Lipscomb	0–2
49th	Maine	0–2
49th	Nicholls	0–2
49th	UNC Wilmington	0–2
49th	Northeastern	0–2
49th	No. 11 Oklahoma State	0–2
49th	San Jose State	0–2
49th	Tulane	0–2
49th	Wright State	0–2

== Record by conference ==
Conference	# of Bids	Record	Win %	Nc Record	Nc Win %	RF	SR	WS	NS	CS	NC
SEC	10	42–23	.646	33–14	.702	8	6	3	2	2	1
ACC	8	23–18	.561	20–15	.571	5	3	2	1	–	–
Big 12	6	15–12	.556	15–12	.556	3	2	1	1	–	–
Summit	1	6–3	.667	6–3	.667	1	1	1	–	–	–
Pac-12	5	13–12	.520	13–12	.520	3	2	1	–	–	–
Missouri Valley	1	3–2	.600	3–2	.600	1	1	–	–	–	–
Sun Belt	4	10–9	.526	10–9	.526	2	1	–	–	–	–
Conference USA	2	4–4	.500	4–4	.500	2	–	–	–	–	–
Big Ten	3	5–6	.455	5–6	.455	2	–	–	–	–	–
Ivy League	1	2–2	.500	2–2	.500	1	–	–	–	–	–
Atlantic 10	1	2–2	.500	2–2	.500	1	–	–	–	–	–
Big South	1	2–2	.500	2–2	.500	1	–	–	–	–	–
Big East	2	3–4	.429	3–4	.429	1	–	–	–	–	–
American	2	2–4	.333	2–4	.333	1	–	–	–	–	–
Big West	1	1–2	.333	1–2	.333	–	–	–	–	–	–
Metro Atlantic	1	1–2	.333	1–2	.333	–	–	–	–	–	–
Southern	1	1–2	.333	1–2	.333	–	–	–	–	–	–
West Coast	1	1–2	.333	1–2	.333	–	–	–	–	–	–
Western Athletic	1	1–2	.333	1–2	.333	–	–	–	–	–	–
Colonial	2	0–4	.000	0–4	.000	–	–	–	–	–	–
America East	1	0–2	.000	0–2	.000	–	–	–	–	–	–
ASUN	1	0–2	.000	0–2	.000	–	–	–	–	–	–
Horizon	1	0–2	.000	0–2	.000	–	–	–	–	–	–
Mid-American	1	0–2	.000	0–2	.000	–	–	–	–	–	–
Mountain West	1	0–2	.000	0–2	.000	–	–	–	–	–	–
Northeast	1	0–2	.000	0–2	.000	–	–	–	–	–	–
Ohio Valley	1	0–2	.000	0–2	.000	–	–	–	–	–	–
Patriot	1	0–2	.000	0–2	.000	–	–	–	–	–	–
Southland	1	0–2	.000	0–2	.000	–	–	–	–	–	–
Southwestern Athletic	1	0–2	.000	0–2	.000	–	–	–	–	–	–

== Media coverage ==
=== Radio ===
NRG Media provided nationwide radio coverage of the Men's College World Series through its Omaha Station KOZN, in association with Westwood One. It also streamed all MCWS games at westwoodonesports.com, Tunein, the Varsity Network, and on SiriusXM.

==== Broadcast assignments ====
- John Bishop, Gary Sharp, and Connor Happer (Gms 1–3, 5–6)
- John Bishop, Gary Sharp, and Nick Handley (Gm 4)
- John Bishop, Mike Ferrin, and Gary Sharp (Gms 7–8, 10–14)
- John Bishop, Nick Handley, and Gary Sharp (Gm 9)
- Kevin Kugler, Scott Graham, and John Bishop (Championship Series)

=== Television ===
ESPN aired every game from the Regionals, Super Regionals, and the Men's College World Series across its networks.

==== Broadcast assignments ====
Regionals

- Clay Matvick and Gregg Olson: Auburn, Alabama
- Dave Neal and Ben McDonald: Baton Rouge, Louisiana
- Anish Shroff and Devon Travis: Charlottesville, Virginia
- Tom Hart and Kyle Peterson: Clemson, South Carolina
- Derek Jones and Roddy Jones: Columbia, South Carolina
- Dani Wexelman and Jay Walker: Conway, South Carolina
- Roy Philpott and Gaby Sánchez: Coral Gables, Florida
- Mike Ferrin and Greg Swindell: Fayetteville, Arkansas
- Mike Monaco and Xavier Scruggs: Gainesville, Florida
- John Schriffen and Todd Walker: Lexington, Kentucky
- Mike Morgan and David Dellucci: Nashville, Tennessee
- Roxy Bernstein and Wes Clements: Stanford, California
- Victor Rojas and Keith Moreland: Stillwater, Oklahoma
- Sam Ravech and Danan Hughes: Terre Haute, Indiana
- Richard Cross and Lance Cormier: Tuscaloosa, Alabama
- Kevin Fitzgerald and Bobby Moranda: Winston-Salem, North Carolina

Super Regionals

- Tom Hart and Ben McDonald: Baton Rouge, Louisiana
- John Schriffen and Lance Cormier: Charlottesville, Virginia
- Roxy Bernstein and Xavier Scruggs: Eugene, Oregon
- Clay Matvick and Gregg Olson: Fort Worth, Texas
- Dave Neal and Chris Burke: Gainesville, Florida
- Roy Philpott and Todd Walker: Hattiesburg, Mississippi
- Mike Monaco and Kyle Peterson: Stanford, California
- Mike Ferrin and Gaby Sánchez: Winston-Salem, North Carolina

Men's College World Series

- Karl Ravech, Eduardo Pérez, Ben McDonald, and Dani Wexelman: June 16 & 17 afternoons
- Mike Monaco, Ben McDonald, and Dani Wexelman: June 18 afternoon
- Mike Monaco, Kyle Peterson, Chris Burke, and Kris Budden: June 16–18 evenings
- Mike Monaco, Ben McDonald, Chris Burke, and Dani Wexelman: June 19–22 afternoons
- Karl Ravech, Eduardo Pérez, Kyle Peterson, and Kris Budden: June 19–22 evenings

MCWS Championship Series

- Karl Ravech (Games 1 & 3) or Mike Monaco (Game 2), Kyle Peterson, Chris Burke, and Kris Budden

== See also ==
- 2023 NCAA Division I softball tournament
- 2023 NCAA Division II baseball tournament
- 2023 NCAA Division III baseball tournament
