= Total Sports Entertainment =

Game software company

TSE Services
- Type: Sports Entertainment
- Founded: 1984
- Founder: Bob Masewicz
- Headquarters: La Crosse, Wisconsin
- Key people: Bob Masewicz (Owner and Chief Consultant); Matt Baker ( National Marketing Director); Jamel Mallad (Director of AV Integration)
- Divisions: Management Systems; Equipment Solutions; Consulting Services

TSE Services (Total Sports Entertainment, Total Sports Services) was a sports entertainment and game software company. TSE works in the field of sports franchise consulting, A/V production and equipment integration, game operations and sponsorship sales systems management software.

TSE's equipment division provided audio/video production systems design and integration. TSE's Management Solutions division provided event management technology including TSE GameTime ScriptPRO, a game management solution for building and executing event scripts and schedules, and SponsorPRO, a sponsorship sales automation system used to organize, execute, and track sponsorship inventory. TSE sold its services to teams such as the Binghamton Mets as well as the Wilmington Blue Rocks.

== Management Systems Division ==
In March 2011, TSE upgraded the company's technology platform with the implementation of CoSentry's secure cloud computing network.

=== TSE GameTime ScriptPRO ===
GameTime ScriptPRO is a patented internet based event management software program used by teams and schools of all levels to streamline events, produce scripts, and generate reports. The customizable interface allows users to build their accounts based on their specific needs. ScriptPRO is designed to prevent scripting errors, save time building event schedules, and enhance the efficiency of the production as a whole. The multi-user system allows real time changes to be viewed system wide. The changes can be made on any device with an internet connection including smart phones. Since 2007 over 40,000 games have been produced by ScriptPRO.

Current GameTime users include: San Francisco Giants, Denver Broncos, Miami Heat, and Vancouver Canucks.

=== TSE GameTime SponsorPRO ===
In October 2010, TSE released a new addition to GameTime. It is an internet-based tool for organizing, tracking and validating all sponsored inventory.

On May 16, 2018, the entire TSE Gametime Suite (ScriptPRO, SponsorPRO and PromoPRO) was acquired by Shoflo, an award-winning event production software company based in Orlando FL.

== Equipment Solutions - AV Design and Integration ==
TSE provided equipment, installation and support for a facility. Video Boards, Video Equipment, Sound Systems, Security Systems. TSE Design-build new audio and video productions or retrofit existing systems/facilities throughout North America. Recent clients included: Pensacola Blue Wahoos, Colorado Springs Sky Sox and West Michigan Whitecaps.

=== Recent Projects ===
Facility	Location	Team Name
BB&T Ballpark (Charlotte)	Charlotte, NC	Charlotte Knights
MacInnes Ice Arena	Houghton, MI	Michigan Tech
Convocation Center	Ypsilanti, MI	Eastern Michigan University
FirstEnergy Stadium	Reading, PA	Reading Fightin Phils
Wings Stadium	Kalamazoo, MI	Kalamazoo Wings
Centennial Field	Burlington, VT	Vermont Lake Monsters
Newman Outdoor Field	Fargo, ND	Fargo-Moorhead RedHawks
Pringles Park	Jackson, TN	Jackson Generals
Boomers Stadium	Schaumburg, IL	Schaumburg Boomers
Fifth Third Ballpark	Grand Rapids, MI	West Michigan Whitecaps
Blue Wahoos Park	Pensacola, FL	Pensacola Blue Wahoos
New Bridge Bank Park	Greensboro, NC	Greensboro Grasshoppers
State Mutual Stadium	Rome, GA	Rome Braves
Smokies Park	Sevierville, TN	Tennessee Smokies
NYSEG Stadium	Binghamton, NY	Binghamton Mets
Metro Bank Park	Harrisburg, PA	Harrisburg Senators
John Thurman Field	Modesto, CA	Modesto Nuts
Amsoil Arena	Duluth, MN	U of MN - Duluth

== Consulting Services Division - Fan Experience Enhancement, Creative Services and Event Production ==
Total Sports Entertainment’s Consulting Services Division offers expertise and guidance from former executives in the sports and entertainment industries. Services include: Content Creation for video displays, Video Board Design and Sourcing, Seminars and Training, Staffing and Recruitment/Head Hunting, among others. TSE is also known for supporting teams in the opening of new franchises, ballparks and new facility renovations.

=== List of Recent TSE Partners and Franchise Openings ===
Team Name	Location	League
Wheeling Nailers	Wheeling, WV	ECHL
Great Lake Loons	Midland, MI	Midwest League
Washington Wild Things	Washington, PA	Frontier League
Muskegon Lumberjacks	Muskegon, MI	United States Hockey League
Normal Cornbelters	Normal, IL	Frontier League
Pensacola Blue Wahoos	Pensacola, FL	Southern League
Southern Illinois Miners	Marion, IL	Frontier League
Sioux Falls Fighting Pheasants	Sioux Falls, SD	American Association of Independent Professional Baseball
Wilmington Blue Rocks	Wilmington, DE	Carolina League
Southern Maryland Blue Crabs	Waldorf, MD	Atlantic League
Binghamton Mets	Binghamton, NY	Eastern League
Quad Cities River Bandits	Davenport, IA	Midwest League

== History ==
In 1984 childhood friends (Bobby Blues) Bob Masewicz and Bill La Rue were dared to enter a talent competition at Big Al's restaurant and Bar in La Crosse, WI.

Sensing the high demand for entertainers in sports venues during the early 1990s, Bob and Bill founded B&B entertainment (now Total Sports Entertainment). The agency focused on providing sports entertainers to companies worldwide.

At the start of the new millennium, Bob Masewicz developed Total Sports Entertainment. In 2002, Bob joined the Altoona Curve Baseball baseball team as their Director of Entertainment/Promotions.

TSE GameTime ScriptPRO was developed and first released in 2006. The TSE suite of software for the event management sector has grown to include a CRM integrated directly to ScriptPRO. SponsorPRO is designed to assist a staff in selling and managing their inventory of sponsorships.
