= Tsetse, South Africa =

Tsetse
- Location within North West (South African province) Location within South Africa
- Coordinates: 25.731°S 25.671°E
- Country: South Africa
- Province: North West
- District: Ngaka Modiri Molema
- Municipality: Mahikeng

Area
  - Total: 2.92 km^{2} (1.13 sq mi)

Population (2011)
  - Total: 4,003
  - Density: 1,370/km^{2} (3,550/sq mi)

Racial makeup (2011)
  - Black African: 99.1%
  - Coloured: 0.6%
  - Indian/Asian: 0.2%
  - Other: 0.1%

First languages (2011)
  - Tswana: 82.9%
  - Sotho: 5.9%
  - Xhosa: 4.6%
  - Zulu: 2.3%
  - Other: 4.3%
- Time zone: UTC+2 (SAST)
- PO box: 2752

Tsetse is a village in Ngaka Modiri Molema District Municipality in the North West province of South Africa.
