= Supreme Electoral Court =

Supreme Electoral Court may refer to:

- Superior Electoral Court of Brazil
- Supreme Electoral Court of Costa Rica
- Supreme Electoral Court (El Salvador)

== See also ==
- Supreme Electoral Tribunal (disambiguation)
