= Oral Roberts Golden Eagles baseball =

American collegiate team

Oral Roberts Golden Eagles
- 2026 Oral Roberts Golden Eagles baseball team
- University: Oral Roberts University
- Head coach: Ryan Folmar (14th season)
- Conference: Summit League
- Location: Tulsa, Oklahoma
- Home stadium: Chapman Park (capacity: 2,418)
- Nickname: Golden Eagles
- Colors: Navy blue, Vegas gold, and white

College World Series appearances
- 1978, 2023

NCAA regional champions
- 1978, 2006, 2023

NCAA tournament appearances
- 1978, 1980, 1981, 1982, 1983, 1985, 1986, 1987 1998, 1999, 2000, 2001, 2002, 2003, 2004, 2005, 2006, 2007, 2008, 2009, 2010, 2011, 2012, 2015, 2016, 2017, 2018, 2022, 2023, 2024

Conference tournament champions
- 1998, 1999, 2000, 2001, 2002, 2003, 2004, 2005, 2006, 2007, 2008, 2009, 2010, 2011, 2012, 2015, 2016, 2018, 2022, 2023, 2024

Conference regular season champions
- 1998, 1999, 2000, 2001, 2002, 2003, 2004, 2005, 2006, 2007, 2008, 2009, 2010, 2011, 2012, 2015, 2016, 2018, 2021, 2023, 2025, 2026

The Oral Roberts Golden Eagles baseball team is the intercollegiate baseball team of Oral Roberts University. It plays in the NCAA Division I Summit League. The team won the Mid-Con and Summit League regular season and tournament titles for 15 years straight between 1998 and 2012. Upon returning to the Summit League, the team repeated the feat in 2015 and 2016. In 2006, they advanced to the NCAA Super Regional.

== Key moments ==
The ORU baseball team advanced to the College World Series in 1978 and has made 22 NCAA tournament appearances overall. In addition, ORU baseball made 15 consecutive NCAA tournament appearances from 1998 to 2012 and played in the regional finals in 2002, 2004, 2005, 2006, 2008, 2009, and 2011, winning the 2006 Regional Championship.

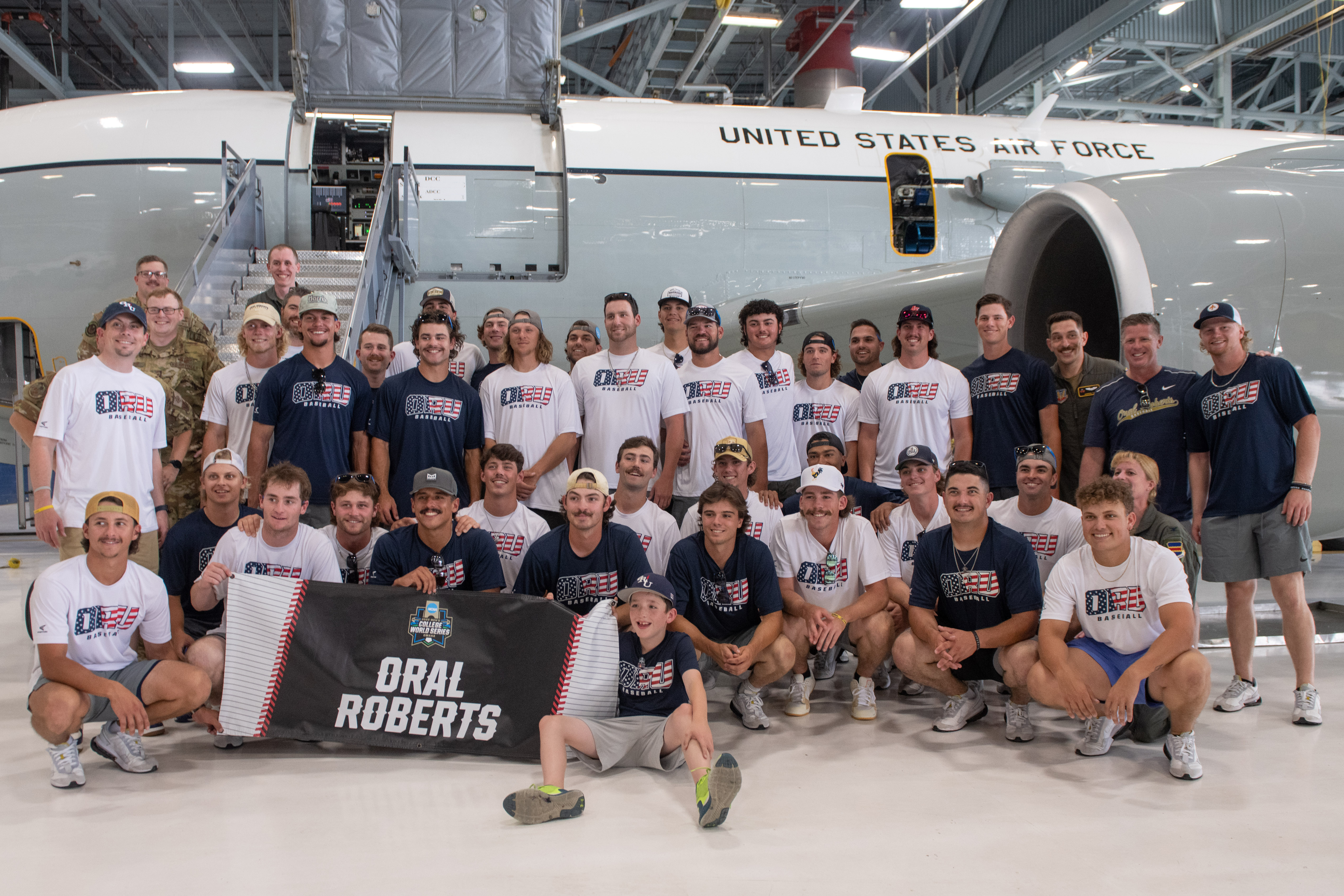
The 2023 team in Omaha during the World Series

In 2023, the team went 23-1 in Summit League play, winning the regular season and conference tournament titles. As the #4 seed in the Stillwater Regional, they defeated Oklahoma State, Washington, and Dallas Baptist University to advance to the Super Regional round of the NCAA tournament. In the Eugene Super Regional, they defeated the host Oregon Ducks to advance to the second College World Series in program history. It was only the third time ever that a #4 seed reached the Men's College World Series. The team went 1-2 in Omaha, finishing the season 52-14, and #8 in the final Coaches Poll of the season.

== Notable players ==
Mike Moore was an ORU standout from 1979–81 and first-round draft pick. He played 14 seasons in the big leagues and was selected an American League All-Star in 1989. He played in consecutive World Series with the Oakland Athletics (1989 and 1990), winning a championship in 1989. Todd Burns (1982–84) was Moore's teammate in Oakland and helped the A's win three straight American League pennants (1988–90) and the 1989 World Series. Keith Lockhart (1985–86) played in the 1999 World Series as a member of the Atlanta Braves and helped that team win five consecutive National League Eastern Division titles. Tom Nieto (1981) played in the 1985 World Series with St. Louis Cardinals and won a championship in 1987 as a member of the Minnesota Twins. Doug Bernier, Michael Hollimon and Steve Holm all made their Major League debuts in 2008. Mike Mason, Keith Miller, Bob Zupcic, Larry Casian and Craig Colbert also played in the Major Leagues.

== Notable coaches ==
Former head coach Larry Cochell guided ORU from 1977–86, leading the school to seven NCAA Regional appearances and the 1978 College World Series. Former coach Sunny Golloway was one of the best skippers in the NCAA Division I, guiding the Golden Eagles to a 294–136 record and five NCAA Regional appearances in seven years at the helm. He was an assistant coach for Team USA in the summer of 2002.

As first year head coach in 2004, Rob Walton guided ORU to the nation's best winning percentage (.820) while also setting a Summit League Conference mark with a 50–11 overall record. The 2004 Golden Eagles were ranked in the Top 20 for 12 consecutive weeks, reaching a high of No. 13 in late May. Walton led ORU to its ninth consecutive Summit League Tournament title and the program's 18th NCAA Regional appearance in 2006. Walton also earned ABCA Midwest Region Coach of the Year honors after guiding the Golden Eagles to a regional championship and final Top 25 ranking in all three major, a program first. Walton also served as the head coach for USA Baseball's National Team during the summer of 2008.

== Chapman Park ==
Chapman Park has been the home of Golden Eagles baseball since 1978. It hosted its first game on March 6, 1978.

In 2008, a 20,000-square-foot (1,900 m^{2}) facility was added which includes coaches' offices, a state-of-the-art weight room and the Grand Slam Room in which boosters and fans can watch ORU games in a climate-controlled environment. The facility is located down the right-field line.

Chapman Park has been host to three NCAA Regionals (1978,1980,1981), 14 conference tournaments, and many All-Americans. Many Major Leaguers have played at Chapman Park, including Roger Clemens, Joe Carter, Kirk Gibson, Tony Gwynn, Keith Lockhart, Pete Incaviglia, Kevin McReynolds, Mike Moore, and Robin Ventura.

Following renovations, the ballpark was renamed to Chapman Park in 2025. The venue was formerly named J. L. Johnson Stadium (1977–2025).

== H.A. Chapman Indoor Practice Facility ==
The H.A. Chapman Indoor Practice Facility opened in the Fall of 2009. The 35,000-square-foot (3,300 m^{2}) facility, located just west of J. L. Johnson Stadium, features indoor practices areas for both baseball and track & field programs. Built at a cost of $1.2 million, the facility was funded exclusively through private donations, including a lead gift from the H.A. and Mary K. Chapman Charitable Trust. The baseball portion of the facility features a regulation-sized infield, three pitching areas and three netted batting cages. The track and field area features a complete pole vault area, high jump pit and long jump and triple jump practice areas.

== Mid-Continent Conference/Summit League achievements ==
- Overall Record of 567–222 (.719)
- 12 Summit League Regular-Season Titles
- 13 Summit League Tournament Titles
- 13 NCAA post-season appearances
- 2006 Regional Champion
- 2002, 2004, 2005, 2008 and 2009 NCAA Regional Runner-up
- Ranked as high as No. 23 nationally in 2008
- Ranked as high as No. 24 nationally in 2007
- Ranked as high as No. 14 nationally in 2006
- Ranked as high as No. 13 nationally in 2004
- Ranked as high as No. 20 nationally in 2002
- Ranked as high as No. 23 nationally in 1998
- Ranked No. 11 nationally in 1987 year end rankings
- 21 All-Americans
- 10 Freshman All-Americans
- 4 Summit League Players of the Year
- 11 Summit League Pitchers of the Year
- 88 First Team All-Summit league selections
- 42 Second Team All-Summit League selections
- 70 Summit League All-Tournament selections
- 13 Summit League Tournament MVPs

== NCAA First-Team All-Americans selections ==
- 1977 Bob Volk
- 1978 Bill Springman
- 1981 Mike Moore
- 1981 Tom Nieto
- 1982 Keith Mucha
- 1984 Todd Burns
- 1999 Jeff Stallings
- 2004 Dennis Bigley
- 2008 Brian Van Kirk

== Major League Baseball ==
Oral Roberts has had 139 Major League Baseball draft selections since the draft began in 1965.

Golden Eagles in the Major League Baseball Draft

Year	Player	Round	Team
1973	Gregory Davis	14	Orioles
1977	William Springman	1	Pirates
1977	Robert Volk	16	White Sox
1978	Asa Slemp	32	Tigers
1978	Wayne Stone	31	Cubs
1978	Robert Volk	17	Padres
1978	William Springman	7	Angels
1978	George Bjorkman	4	Cardinals
1978	Ron Meridith	4	Astros
1979	Alfredo Mejia	1	Dodgers
1979	Warren Hollier	8	Angels
1980	Mike Mason	1	Rangers
1980	Jeff Heathcock	1	Astros
1980	Mark Bonner	22	Braves
1980	Gary D'Onofrio	13	Astros
1980	Dave Yobs	8	Yankees
1981	Ray Krawczyk	1	Pirates
1981	Bruce Heiser	19	Braves
1981	Robert Macias	18	Padres
1981	Dave Yobs	14	White Sox
1981	Bud Bartholow	11	Phillies
1981	Tom Nieto	3	Cardinals
1981	Kelvin Torve	2	Giants
1981	Mike Moore	1	Mariners
1982	Keith Mucha	31	Athletics
1983	Roger Lewis	19	Athletics
1983	Kenny Houp	16	Reds
1983	Dave Atten	15	Giants
1983	Keith Mucha	14	Orioles
1983	Steven Wolff	13	Padres
1983	Gregory Cottrell	13	Twins
1983	Ron Henika	7	Reds
1984	Todd Burns	7	Athletics
1984	Keith Miller	2	Yankees
1985	Tim McCoy	3	Rangers
1985	Page Odle	34	Pirates
1985	Michael Batesole	14	Dodgers
1985	Joe Dunlap	4	Reds
1986	Michael Shambaugh	28	Orioles
1986	Craig Colbert	20	Giants
1986	Tony Lapoint	19	Cubs
1986	Keith Lockhart	11	Reds
1986	Tim McCoy	6	Giants
1987	Peter Schmidt	38	Phillies
1987	Kyle Irvin	21	Mets
1987	Brad Robinson	19	Reds
1987	Brad Harvick	14	Cardinals
1987	Steve Hecht	5	Giants
1987	Bob Zupcic	1	Red Sox
1988	Sean Grubb	27	Cardinals
1988	Kyle Irvin	23	Royals
1988	Rick Vaughn	18	Blue Jays
1988	Anthony Ward	10	Blue Jays
1989	Jay Franklin	8	Rangers
1990	David Marcon	26	Blue Jays
1991	John O'Brien	34	Cardinals
1991	Paul Meade	9	Indians
1992	Mark Moore	50	Athletics
1993	Bryan Wolff	18	Padres
1995	Nick Kast	60	Cardinals
1995	Harold Frazier	32	Mariners
1996	Brian Rios	18	Tigers
1996	Brandon Marsters	9	Phillies
1997	Brett Casper	8	Giants
1998	Mike Dean	3	Giants
1999	Matt Hoffman	21	Rockies
1999	Jason Clements	19	Athletics
1999	Mike Hill	18	Astros
2000	Bryan Gann	47	Giants
2000	Jordan Gerk	41	Tigers
2000	Ryan Neill	22	Tigers
2000	Mike Rose	15	Expos
2000	Jackson Markert	11	Giants
2001	Trevor Leu	32	Tigers
2001	Michael Rogers	20	Indians
2001	Steve Holm	17	Giants
2002	Stockton Davis	21	Expos
2002	Troy Pickford	8	Tigers
2002	Wilton Reynolds	7	Tigers
2003	David Castillo	7	Athletics
2004	Rene Recio	47	Tigers
2004	Nate Griffin	40	Yankees
2004	Josh Lex	28	Blue Jays
2004	Grant Plumley	9	Yankees
2004	Matt Van Der Bosch	9	Red Sox
2005	Timothy Robertson	31	Tigers
2005	Matt Hancock	27	Red Sox
2005	Travis DeBondt	22	Dodgers
2005	Dennis Bigley	22	Blue Jays
2005	Michael Hollimon	16	Tigers
2006	Tim Torres	23	Astros
2006	Sean Jarrett	20	Rockies
2006	Andy Bouchie	7	Brewers
2007	Chad Rothford	42	Giants
2007	Erik Crichton	20	Tigers
2007	Jake Kahaulelio	20	Reds
2007	Chance Chapman	8	Phillies
2007	Jeremy Hefner	5	Padres
2008	Brendan Duffy	41	Diamondbacks
2008	Ben Petralli	33	Rangers
2008	Carlos Luna	30	Rockies
2008	Michael Jarman	26	Rays
2008	Ryan Groth	22	Angels
2008	Brian Van Kirk	21	Blue Jays
2008	Adam Younger	18	Angels
2008	David Genao	18	Rays
2009	Juan Martinez	46	Giants
2009	Andre Lamontagne	11	Brewers
2009	Mark Serrano	6	Reds
2009	Jerry Sullivan	3	Padres
2010	Dallas Beeler	41	Cubs
2010	Tyler Saladino	7	White Sox
2011	Nick Baligod	40	Blue Jays
2012	Bennett Pickar	11	Tigers
2012	Cam Schiller	7	Rangers
2013	Nathan Goro	27	Angels
2013	Chi Chi Gonzalez	1	Rangers
2014	Gavin Glanz	23	Rockies
2014	Jordan Romano	10	Blue Jays
2014	Jose Trevino	6	Rangers
2015	Jacob McDavid	40	Angels
2015	Guillermo Trujillo	35	Orioles
2015	Xavier Altamirano	27	Athletics
2015	Austin Afenir	25	Yankees
2015	Anthony Sequeira	23	Phillies
2016	Holden Cammack	16	Cubs
2017	Matt Whatley	3	Rangers
2017	Dylan Snypes	15	Mets
2017	Bryce Howe	18	Marlins
2017	Josh McMinn	36	Twins
2018	Kyler Stout	18	Diamondbacks
2018	Cal Hernandez	26	Mariners
2018	Taylor Varnell	29	White Sox
2018	Miguel Ausua	29	Rockies
2018	Justin McGregor	31	Reds
2018	Grant Townsend	34	Blue Jays
2019	Spencer Henson	9	Yankees
2019	Josh McMinn	27	Diamondbacks
2022	Isaac Coffey	10	Red Sox
2022	Jackson Loftin	13	Astros
2023	Jonah Cox	6	Athletics
2023	Cade Denton	6	Rockies
2023	Jacob Widener	9	Royals
2023	Mac McCroskey	20	Angels
2024	Jakob Hall	8	Twins
2024	Brooks Fowler	15	Rangers

== See also ==
- List of NCAA Division I baseball programs
