= Newman Outdoor Field =

Baseball stadium in Fargo, North Dakota, US

Coordinates: 46°53′54.56″N 96°48′15.37″W

- The Nest

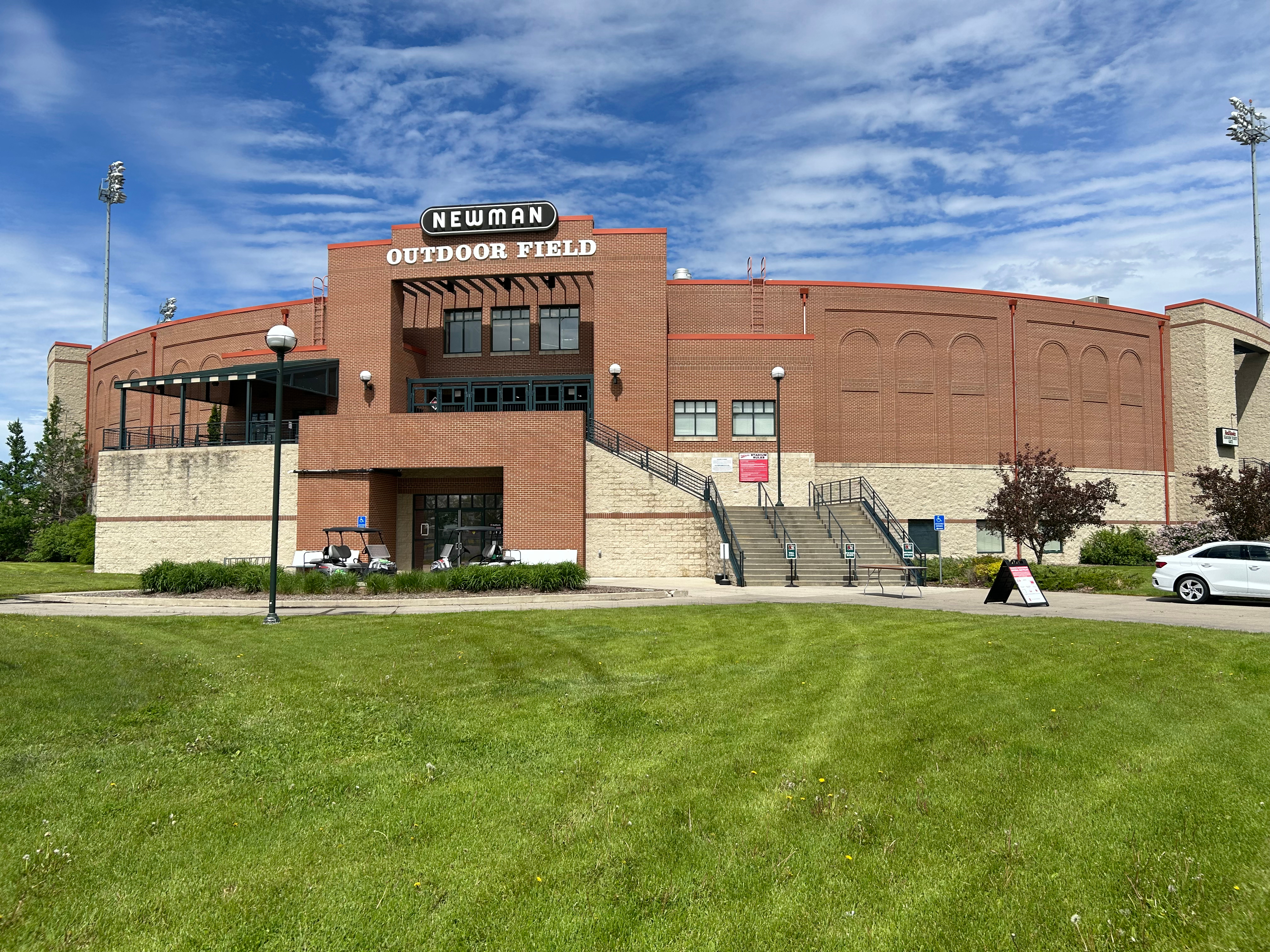
- Interactive map of Newman Outdoor Field
- Former names: The Nest (1996-2000)
- Location: 1515 15th Avenue North; Fargo, North Dakota 58102
- Owner: North Dakota State University
- Capacity: 4,465 (1996–2002); 4,623 (2002–2015); 4,513 (2015–present)
- Field size: Left – 318'; Left-center – 398'; Center – 408'; Right-center – 353'; Right – 314'

Construction
- Groundbreaking: 1995
- Opened: June 21, 1996
- Architects: R.L. Engebretson P.C. & Sink Combs Dethlefs

Tenants
- Fargo-Moorhead RedHawks (AA) (1996–present); North Dakota State Bison (NCAA) (1996–present); Winnipeg Goldeyes (AA) (2020)

Newman Outdoor Field is a baseball stadium in Fargo, North Dakota. It is located on the campus of North Dakota State University and is the home of the independent American Association's Fargo-Moorhead RedHawks and the North Dakota State Bison baseball team.

The 4,513-seat facility opened in 1996. In 1998, naming rights were sold to Newman Outdoor Advertising for $1.5 million. Fargo based architect firm R.L. Engebretson P.C. worked on the design with RedHawks GM John Dittrich and Assistant GM Tim Flakoll and City of Fargo leaders.

The stadium contained the Maury Wills Museum in honor of the former Major League Baseball player who worked for the RedHawks as a coach and a radio analyst until the conclusion of the 2017 Season.

The stadium at Newman Outdoor Field holds the world's largest wooden bat. That designation has been confirmed by the Guinness Book of World Records. The idea came to GM Tim Flakoll after seeing the large wooden bat at the end of the movie "A League of Their Own." It is 161 inches long and made by specs to replicate a Louisville Slugger bat. It was made by Cinderwit company in Wahpeton, ND and unveiled in 2000. It was named "Big Bruce" after RedHawks' executive and one-time owner Bruce Thom.

The first number retired at the stadium was the #8 worn by hometown hero Roger Maris when he played for the Fargo-Moorhead Twins in the 1950s. The outfield distances replicate those of Yankee Stadium where Maris made history.

In 2009, Newman Outdoor Field hosted the American Legion World Series which was won by Post 165 from Midland, Michigan.

In 2012, college baseball writer Eric Sorenson ranked the field the sixth most underrated venue in Division I baseball.

The stadium was of the four hub stadiums used for the six team shortened American Association season in 2020. It was the hub stadium for the RedHawks as well as the Winnipeg Goldeyes.

In 2021, the stadium played host to the second NDSU Baseball team to make it to the 2021 NCAA Division I baseball tournament as the Bison went 14–4 at home that season.

In 2023, the stadium hosted the 2023 Summit League baseball tournament after the NDSU Baseball team won their first Summit League regular season title in program history.

== See also ==
- List of NCAA Division I baseball venues

Events and tenants
Preceded by Lewis and Clark Park	Host of the NoL All-Star Game; Newman Outdoor Field; 1999	Succeeded by Yogi Berra Stadium
Preceded by CommunityAmerica Ballpark	Host of the NoL All-Star Game; Newman Outdoor Field; 2007	Succeeded by Canwest Park
