= 2025 North Dakota State Bison baseball team =

American college baseball season

2025 North Dakota State Bison baseball

Summit League Champion Fayetteville Regional
- Conference: Summit League
- Record: 21–34 (13–15 Summit)
- Head coach: Tyler Oakes (4th season)
- Assistant coaches: Brandon Hunt; Tanner Neale; Trent Keefer
- Home stadium: Newman Outdoor Field

2025 Summit League baseball standings
	Conf.				Overall
Team	W		L	PCT	W		L	PCT
Oral Roberts ‍†‍‍	21	–	9	.700	37	–	22	.627
St. Thomas* ‍†‍‍	21	–	9	.700	29	–	21	.580
North Dakota State ‍‍‡‍^{y}	13	–	15	.464	21	–	34	.382
Omaha ‍‍‍	12	–	16	.429	20	–	30	.400
South Dakota State ‍‍‍	12	–	18	.400	16	–	36	.308
Northern Colorado ‍‍‍	9	–	21	.300	18	–	33	.353
† – Conference champion ‡ – Tournament champion y – Invited to the NCAA Tournament * Ineligible for the 2025 NCAA tournament due to transition from Division III; Rankings from D1Baseball

The 2025 North Dakota State Bison baseball team represented North Dakota State University during the 2025 NCAA Division I baseball season. The Bison played home games at Newman Outdoor Field on NDSU's campus and were coached by fourth-year head coach Tyler Oakes.

The Bison finished the season with a 21–34 overall record and a 13–15 conference record, which was good for 3rd in the Summit League. NDSU made the Summit League tournament as the second seed, since the 2nd place team in the regular season (St. Thomas) was ineligible, and played Omaha in the opening round. The Bison defeated the Mavericks and then defeated Oral Roberts in the semifinals to reach the championship games. In the final round, NDSU would rematch with the Golden Eagles and win the second game to win the program's third Summit League tournament and NCAA tournament berth. In the NCAA tournament, the Bison would fall to Arkansas before defeating Kansas for the program's second ever NCAA Division I baseball tournament win. They would fall to Creighton to be eliminated from the tournament.

== Previous season ==
The Bison finished the 2024 season with a 20–30–1 overall record, and a 14–12–1 record in the Summit League. In the Summit League tournament, the Bison lost the opening round game to Oral Roberts, won the first elimination game over Omaha, but fell to Northern Colorado in the last lower bracket game to be eliminated from the tournament.

== Personnel ==
=== Roster ===
2025 North Dakota State Roster
Pitchers: 12 – Matt Sargeant – Sophomore; 13 – Roman Trapani – Sophomore; 16 – Nolan Johnson – RS Junior; 17 – Sam Roberts – Senior; 20 – Logan Knight – Senior; 22 – Hayden Sylte – RS Senior; 25 – Parker Puetz – RS Sophomore; 26 – Ethan Swaby – Freshman; 27 – Julien Hachem – Junior; 28 – Danny Lachenmayer – Freshman; 29 – Ben Berkhof – RS Freshman; 30 – Reese Ligtenberg – RS Senior; 31 – Seth Thompson – Senior; 33 – Landon Koenig – Sophomore; 34 – Cade Wiegert – Junior; 35 – Leland Wilson – RS Senior; 36 – Garrett Shupe – Freshman; 37 – Cole Mahlum – Senior; 38 – Alex Karns – Senior; 40 – Austin Bergum – Senior; 41 – Luke Agnew – RS Freshman; 44 – Skyler Riedinger – RS Senior	Catchers: 7 – Evan Gustafson – RS Freshman; 15 – Bennett Freiter – RS Junior; Infielders: 4 – Jake Schaffner – Sophomore; 5 – Davis Hamilton – Junior; 6 – Alex Urlaub – Senior; 10 – Luis Garcia – Senior; 18 – Aiden Schenk – RS Freshman; 19 – Tommy Simon – Freshman; 24 – Luke Shannahan – Junior	Outfielders: 3 – Kyle Law – Junior; 8 – Sam Canton – Senior; 9 – Will Mann – Junior; 14 – Colten Becker – Senior; 32 – Dante Smith – Freshman; Utility: 1 – Noah Gordon (C/UTIL) – Sophomore; 2 – Blake Timmons (OF/INF) – RS Freshman; 11 – Tate Martin (INF/RHP) – Freshman

=== Coaching staff ===
2025 North Dakota State Coaching Staff
Name	Position
Tyler Oakes	Head coach
Brandon Hunt	Assistant Coach
Tanner Neale	Assistant Coach
Trent Keefer	Assistant Coach

== Schedule and results ==
2025 North Dakota State Bison baseball game log
Regular season (17–31)

February (1–8)
Date	Opponent	Rank	Site/stadium	Score	Win	Loss	Save	Attendance	Overall record	Summit League Record
February 14	at No. 21 Dallas Baptist		Horner Ballpark; Dallas, TX	6–11	Bonn (1–0)	**Johnson (0–1)**	None	973	0–1	–
February 15	at No. 21 Dallas Baptist		Horner Ballpark	2–5	Pettitte (1–0)	**Knight (0–1)**	Peters (1)	998	0–2	–
February 16	at No. 21 Dallas Baptist		Horner Ballpark	1–11	Schwede (1–0)	**Martin (0–1)**	None	779	0–3	–
February 18	at Lamar		Vincent-Beck Stadium; Beaumont, TX	3–10	Sutton (1–0)	**Agnew (0–1)**	None	568	0–4	–
February 19	at Lamar		Vincent-Beck Stadium	2–13^{(7)}	Stallings (1–0)	**Sargeant (0–1)**	None	543	0–5	–
February 22	at UTRGV		UTRGV Baseball Stadium; Edinburg, TX	Canceled, Rain					0–5	–
February 23	at UTRGV		UTRGV Baseball Stadium	3–10^{(7)}	Loa (1–1)	**Johnson (0–2)**	Thayer (1)	1,173	0–6	–
February 23	at UTRGV		UTRGV Baseball Stadium	7–5	**Riedinger (1–0)**	Oliva (0–1)	None	1,173	1–6	–
February 28	at No. 20 Alabama		Sewell–Thomas Stadium; Tuscaloosa, AL	4–12	Myers (1–0)	**Johnson (0–3)**	None	4,180	1–7	–

March (7–9)
Date	Opponent	Rank	Site/stadium	Score	Win	Loss	Save	Attendance	Overall Record	Summit League Record
March 1	at No. 20 Alabama		Sewell–Thomas Stadium	7–9	Quick (3–0)	**Knight (0–2)**	Ozmer (3)	4,019	1–8	–
March 2	at No. 20 Alabama		Sewell–Thomas Stadium	3–11	Alcock (2–0)	**Martin (0–2)**	None	3,419	1–9	–
March 4	at No. 2 LSU		Alex Box Stadium; Baton Rouge, LA	9–11	Cowan (2–0)	**Lachenmayer (0–1)**	Evans (3)	9,892	1–10	–
March 5	at No. 2 LSU		Alex Box Stadium	3–13^{(7)}	Schmidt (2–0)	**Shupe (0–1)**	None	10,446	1–11	–
March 7	at Tulane		Greer Field at Turchin Stadium	6–7	Moore (2–1)	**Lachenmayer (0–2)**	None	1,642	1–12	–
March 8	at Tulane		Greer Field	3–9	Cehajic (3–1)	**Knight (0–3)**	None	1,241	1–13	–
March 9	at Tulane		Greer Field	12–3	**Ligtenberg (1–0)**	Rodriguez (1–1)	None	1,449	2–13	–
March 15	at Oral Roberts		J. L. Johnson Stadium; Tulsa, OK	9–8	**Johnson (1–3)**	Rouse (1–1)	**Lachenmayer (1)**	511	3–13	1–0
March 15	at Oral Roberts		J. L. Johnson Stadium	3–0	**Knight (1–3)**	Love (2–3)	None	479	4–13	2–0
March 16	at Oral Roberts		J. L. Johnson Stadium	6–9	Patten (2–0)	**Bergum (0–1)**	Floyd (4)	517	4–14	2–1
March 18	at Oklahoma State		O'Brate Stadium; Stillwater, OK	1–9	Pesca (1–0)	**Shupe (0–2)**	None	4,491	4–15	–
March 19	at Oklahoma State		O'Brate Stadium	Canceled, Weather Conditions					4–15	–
March 21	at Northern Colorado		Jackson Field; Greeley, CO	8–7	**Lachenmayer (1–2)**	Hose (0–1)	None	260	5–15	3–1
March 22	at Northern Colorado		Jackson Field	3–4	Hose (1–1)	**Ligtenberg (1–1)**	None	251	5–16	3–2
March 23	at Northern Colorado		Jackson Field	11–8	**Riedinger (2–0)**	Tuttle (2–2)	**Lachenmayer (2)**	257	6–16	4–2
March 28	South Dakota State		Newman Outdoor Field; Fargo, ND	5–2	**Johnson (2–3)**	Duerr (1–3)	**Lachenmayer (3)**	214	7–16	5–2
March 28	South Dakota State		Newman Outdoor Field	3–2	**Riedinger (3–0)**	Driessen (1–1)	None	214	8–16	6–2

April (7–10)
Date	Opponent	Rank	Site/stadium	Score	Win	Loss	Save	Attendance	Overall Record	Summit League Record
April 4	at Omaha		Tal Anderson Field; Omaha, NE	6–3	**Johnson (3–3)**	Teinert (0–4)	**Lachenmayer (4)**	467	9–16	7–2
April 5	at Omaha		Tal Anderson Field	1–5	Weber (1–3)	**Knight (1–4)**	Foerstch (1)	538	9–17	7–3
April 6	at Omaha		Tal Anderson Field	1–11^{(7)}	Curtis (1–3)	**Puetz (0–1)**	None	529	9–18	7–4
April 8	at Creighton		Charles Schwab Field Omaha; Omaha, NE	3–2	**Wiegert (1–0)**	Langrell (3–1)	**Lachenmayer (5)**	1,265	10–18	–
April 11	St. Thomas		Newman Outdoor Field	1–7	Kruzan (6–0)	**Johnson (3–4)**	None	423	10–19	7–5
April 12	St. Thomas		Newman Outdoor Field	8–6	**Koenig (1–0)**	Dalen (1–1)	**Lachenmayer (6)**	383	11–19	8–5
April 13	St. Thomas		Newman Outdoor Field	6–1	**Puetz (1–1)**	Cano (1–2)	None	288	12–19	9–5
April 15	at Minnesota		Siebert Field; Minneapolis, MN	2–9	Urban (2–0)	**Wilson (0–1)**	None	698	12–20	–
April 17	Northern Colorado		Newman Outdoor Field	11–3	**Johnson (4–4)**	Gienger (1–3)	None	146	13–20	10–5
April 18	Northern Colorado		Newman Outdoor Field	5–8	Landen (1–2)	**Knight (1–5)**	None	142	13–21	10–6
April 19	Northern Colorado		Newman Outdoor Field	4–6	Storey (2–2)	**Shupe (0–3)**	Hudson (1)	225	13–22	10–7
April 22	at Creighton		Charles Schwab Field Omaha	2–5	Koosman (5–3)	**Wilson (0–2)**	Wendt (2)	982	13–23	–
April 25	at South Dakota State		Erv Huether Field; Brookings, SD	3–6	Driessen (2–1)	**Riedinger (3–1)**	None	192	13–24	10–8
April 26	at South Dakota State		Erv Huether Field	8–4	**Knight (2–5)**	Duerr (3–4)	**Sylte (1)**	306	14–24	11–8
April 26	at South Dakota State; Rescheduled from March 29		Erv Huether Field	6–8	Goble (2–1)	**Koenig (1–1)**	Driessen (4)	306	14–25	11–9
April 27	at South Dakota State		Erv Huether Field	6–9	Madison (2–2)	**Wilson (0–3)**	Driessen (5)	231	14–26	11–10
April 29	at Minnesota		Siebert Field	6–3	**Roberts (1–0)**	Ryerse (0–2)	**Lachenmayer (7)**	570	15–26	–

May (2–5)
Date	Opponent	Rank	Site/stadium	Score	Win	Loss	Save	Attendance	Overall Record	Summit League Record
May 2	Oral Roberts		Newman Outdoor Field	1–2^{(10)}	Patten (4–0)	**Lachenmayer (1–3)**	None	417	15–27	11–11
May 3	Oral Roberts		Newman Outdoor Field	8–4	**Knight (3–4)**	Love (6–6)	None	376	16–27	12–11
May 4	Oral Roberts		Newman Outdoor Field	8–9^{(10)}	Floyd (2–0)	**Riedinger (3–2)**	None	486	16–28	12–12
May 7	Fargo-Moorhead RedHawks; Exhibition Game		Newman Outdoor Field	4–5	Rodriguez	**Sargeant**	Quesada	1,908	–	–
May 9	at St. Thomas		Koch Diamond; St. Paul, MN	4–5	Kruzan (8–1)	**Johnson (4–5)**	Endres (3)	461	16–29	12–13
May 10	at St. Thomas		Koch Diamond	1–3	Ritter (5–1)	**Knight (3–5)**	Skilbeck (6)	498	16–30	12–14
May 11	at St. Thomas		Koch Diamond	2–9	Retz (5–1)	**Puetz (1–2)**	None	407	16–31	12–15
May 16	Omaha		Newman Outdoor Field	Canceled, Cold Temperatures					16–31	12–15
May 16	Omaha		Newman Outdoor Field	Canceled, Cold Temperatures					16–31	12–15
May 17	Omaha		Newman Outdoor Field	12–2^{(7)}	**Wilson (1–3)**	Foerstch (2–3)	None	159	17–31	13–15

Postseason (4–3)

Summit League Tournament (3–1)
Date	Opponent	Rank	Site/stadium	Score	Win	Loss	Save	Attendance	Overall Record	Summit League Tournament Record
May 21	at (3) Omaha; First Round	(2)	Tal Anderson Field; Omaha, NE	1–0^{(10)}	**Lachenmayer (2–3)**	Mabee (1–2)	None	560	18–31	1–0
May 22	vs. (1) Oral Roberts; Winners Semifinal	(2)	Tal Anderson Field	4–0	**Knight (4–5)**	Love (6–7)	None	197	19–31	2–0
May 24	vs. (1) Oral Roberts; Finals Game 1	(2)	Tal Anderson Field	1–3	Patten (6–0)	**Puetz (1–3)**	Floyd (9)	322	19–32	2–1
May 24	vs. (1) Oral Roberts; Finals Game 2	(2)	Tal Anderson Field	4–2	**Sylte (1–0)**	Ruthardt (0–1)	**Lachenmayer (8)**	322	20–32	3–1

NCAA Tournament (1–2)
Date	Opponent	Rank	Site/stadium	Score	Win	Loss	Save	Attendance	Overall Record	NCAA Tournament Record
May 30	at No. 3 (1) Arkansas	(4)	Baum–Walker Stadium; Fayetteville, AR	2–6	Coil (3–0)	**Johnson (4–6)**	None	9,994	20–33	0–1
May 31	vs. (2) Kansas	(4)	Baum–Walker Stadium	4–3	**Knight (5–6)**	Moore (7–3)	**Lachenmayer (9)**	9,685	21–33	1–1
June 1	vs. (3) Creighton	(4)	Baum–Walker Stadium	10–11	Langrell (7–1)	**Lachenmayer (2–4)**	None	9,588	21–34	1–2

- Win
- Loss
- Postponement
- Bold: Bison team member
- Rankings from D1Baseball.com:
- (#) Tournament seedings in parentheses.
- NCAA tournament rankings are overall seeds.

=== Fayetteville Regional ===
Fayetteville Regional Teams
(1) Arkansas Razorbacks	(2) Kansas Jayhawks	(3) Creighton Bluejays	(4) North Dakota State Bison
