= 2021 North Dakota State Bison baseball team =

2021 NDSU Baseball team

2021 North Dakota State Bison baseball

Summit League Champion Stanford Regional
- Conference: Summit League
- Record: 42-19 (20-11 Summit)
- Head coach: Tod Brown (14th season)
- Assistant coaches: Tyler Oakes; David Pearson; Tanner Neale
- Home stadium: Newman Outdoor Field

2021 Summit League baseball standings
	Conf.				Overall
Team	W		L	PCT	W		L	PCT
Oral Roberts ‍†‍‍	19	–	7	.731	31	–	23	.574
North Dakota State ‍‍‡‍^{y}	20	–	11	.645	42	–	19	.689
Omaha ‍‍‍	14	–	12	.538	22	–	25	.468
South Dakota State ‍‍‍	9	–	19	.321	15	–	32	.319
Western Illinois ‍‍‍	7	–	20	.259	11	–	29	.275
† – Conference champion ‡ – Tournament champion y – Invited to the NCAA tournament As of June 6, 2021; Rankings from D1Baseball

The 2021 North Dakota State Bison baseball team represented North Dakota State University during the 2021 NCAA Division I baseball season. The Bison play their home games at Newman Outdoor Field adjacent to NDSU's campus. The team was coached by Tod Brown in his 14th season at NDSU. The Bison won the Summit League tournament for the second time since entering Division 1 and first time since the 2014 season. After entering the NCAA tournament the Bison went 1-2 and were eliminated after being defeated by No. 7 overall Stanford and No. 17 overall UC Irvine. They defeated Nevada for the team's first ever NCAA Division I Tournament game win.

== Previous season ==
The Bison began the 2020 season 8-9 before the NCAA's decision to cancel the season on March 12 due to the COVID-19 pandemic. Due to the season's cancellation, all Division I college baseball players were granted an extra year of eligibility.

== Personnel ==
=== Roster ===
2021 North Dakota State roster
Pitchers: 12 - Thomas Bruchu – Junior; 18 - Jake Drew – Junior; 22 - Hayden Sylte – Freshman; 23 - Zach Smith – Junior; 24 - Evan Sankey – Junior; 25 - Riley Johnson – Junior; 27 - Ben Smith – Sophomore; 28 - Barron Holtz – Sophomore; 30 - Reese Ligtenberg – Freshman; 31 - Max Loven – Sophomore; 32 - Parker Harm – Senior; 35 - Gabe Pilla – Sophomore; 37 - Jaxon Edwards – Freshman; 38 - Shea Zetterman – Sophomore; 40 - Tristen Roehrich – Sophomore; 44 - Skyler Riedinger – Freshman	Catchers: 7 - Will Busch – Freshman; 20 - Nick Emanuel – Senior; Infielders: 1 - Bennett Hostetler – Senior; 2 - Peter Brookshaw – Sophomore; 3 - Noah Dehne – Freshman; 4 - Charley Hesse – Junior; 5 - Tucker Rohde – Senior; 9 - Garret Hill – Freshman; 16 - Jason Chiu – Freshman; 17 - Zach Kluvers – Freshman; 26 - Carson Hake – Freshman	Outfielders: 6 - Calen Schwabe – Junior; 13 - Zach Solano – Sophomore; 19 - Jake Malec – Senior; 36 - Nathan Vermaas – Freshman; Utility: 8 - Caden Edwards (P/INF) – Freshman; 10 - Cade Feeney (P/INF) – Freshman; 11 - Brock Anderson (UTIL/P) – Sophomore; 14 - Wyatt Nelson (P/OF) – Freshman; 29 - Jack Simonsen (C/OF) – Junior; 33 - Hunter Koep (P/INF) – Junior; 34 - Joey Danielson (P/C) – Sophomore

=== Coaching staff ===
2021 North Dakota State Coaching Staff
Name	Position
Tod Brown	Head coach
David Pearson	Assistant Coach
Tyler Oakes	Associate head coach/recruiting coordinator
Tanner Neale	Volunteer assistant coach

== Schedule and results ==
2021 North Dakota State Bison baseball game log
Regular season (38-16)

February (5-1)
Date	Opponent	Rank	Site/stadium	Score	Win	Loss	Save	Overall record	Summit League Record
February 21	at Western Kentucky		Nick Denes Field; Bowling Green, KY	4-10	Kates (1-0)	**Harm (0-1)**	None	0-1	-
February 22	at Western Kentucky		Nick Denes Field	8-5	**Smith (1-0)**	Hicks (0-1)	**Anderson (1)**	1-1	-
February 22	at Western Kentucky		Nick Denes Field	10-2	**Sankey (1-0)**	O'Connell (0-1)	None	2-1	-
February 26	at Saint Louis		Billiken Sports Center; St. Louis, MO	7-4	**Drew (1-0)**	Harris (0-1)	**Nelson (1)**	3-1	-
February 27	at Saint Louis		Billiken Sports Center	5-4	**Feeney (1-0)**	Finkelburg (0-1)	**Harm (1)**	4-1	-
February 27	at Saint Louis		Billiken Sports Center	6-5	**Smith (2-0)**	Dauman (0-1)	**Riedinger (1)**	5-1	-
February 28	at Saint Louis		Billiken Sports Center	Canceled, Rain				5-1	-

March (11-5)
Date	Opponent	Rank	Site/stadium	Score	Win	Loss	Save	Overall Record	Summit League Record
March 5	at Northern Colorado		Nottingham Field; Greeley, CO	4-8	Wyatt (1-0)	**Riedinger (0-1)**	None	5-2	-
March 6	at Northern Colorado		Nottingham Field	11-1	**Sankey (2-0)**	Leach (0-1)	None	6-2	-
March 6	at Northern Colorado		Nottingham Field	4-14^{(8)}	Salim (1-0)	**Roehrich (0-1)**	None	6-3	-
March 7	at Northern Colorado		Nottingham Field	11-1^{(7)}	**Smith (3-0)**	Mazzetti (0-1)	None	7-3	-
March 12	at Dayton		Woerner Field; Dayton, OH	5-1	**Feeney (2-0)**	Jones (0-1)	**Harm (2)**	8-3	-
March 13	at Dayton		Woerner Field	9-1	**Sankey (3-0)**	Olson (0-1)	None	9-3	-
March 14	at Dayton		Woerner Field	4-3	**Smith (4-0)**	Keller (0-1)	**Roehrich (1)**	10-3	-
March 16	at Dayton		Woerner Field	9-3	**Smith (5-0)**	Pletka (0-1)	None	11-3	-
March 19	at Western Illinois		Alfred D. Boyer Stadium; Macomb, IL	11-2	**Feeney (3-0)**	Sears (0-1)	None	12-3	1-0
March 20	at Western Illinois		Alfred D. Boyer Stadium	7-3	**Smith (6-0)**	Fochs (0-1)	**Nelson (1)**	13-3	2-0
March 20	at Western Illinois		Alfred D. Boyer Stadium	8-4^{(8)}	**Drew (2-0)**	Edwards (0-1)	**Harm (3)**	14-3	3-0
March 21	at Western Illinois		Alfred D. Boyer Stadium	7-9	Gray (1-0)	**Pilla (0-1)**	Edwards (1)	14-4	3-1
March 26	at Oral Roberts		J. L. Johnson Stadium; Tulsa, OK	6-3^{(12)}	**Harm (1-1)**	Pierce (0-1)	**Nelson (3)**	15-4	4-1
March 26	at Oral Roberts		J. L. Johnson Stadium	4-5	Scoggins (1-0)	**Riedinger (0-2)**	None	15-5	4-2
March 27	at Oral Roberts		J. L. Johnson Stadium	3-5	Kowalski (1-0)	**Smith (6-1)**	Archambo (1)	15-6	4-3
March 28	at Oral Roberts		J. L. Johnson Stadium	9-7	**Loven (1-0)**	Notary (0-1)	**Nelson (4)**	16-6	5-3

April (11-6)
Date	Opponent	Rank	Site/stadium	Score	Win	Loss	Save	Overall Record	Summit League Record
April 2	at Omaha		Tal Anderson Field; Omaha, NE	4-15	Machado (1-0)	**Feeney (3-1)**	Smith (1)	16-7	5-4
April 2	at Omaha		Tal Anderson Field	8-2	**Sankey (4-0)**	Koelewyn (0-1)	None	17-7	6-4
April 3	at Omaha		Tal Anderson Field	0-7	Holetz (1-0)	**Smith (6-2)**	Blunt (1)	17-8	6-5
April 4	at Omaha		Tal Anderson Field	10-4	**Pilla (1-1)**	Scott (0-1)	None	18-8	7-5
April 9	Western Illinois		Newman Outdoor Field; Fargo, ND	2-0	**Feeney (4-1)**	Warkentien (0-1)	None	19-8	8-5
April 10	Western Illinois		Newman Outdoor Field	10-7	**Smith (7-2)**	Fochs (0-1)	**Nelson (5)**	20-8	9-5
April 10	Western Illinois		Newman Outdoor Field	6-3	**Sankey (5-0)**	Beck (0-1)	**Harm (4)**	21-8	10-5
April 11	Western Illinois		Newman Outdoor Field	6-5^{(14)}	**Pilla (2-1)**	Gray (0-1)	None	22-8	11-5
April 16	Oral Roberts		Newman Outdoor Field	6-8	Weber (1-0)	**Harm (1-2)**	Scoggins (1)	22-9	11-6
April 17	Oral Roberts		Newman Outdoor Field	14-11	**Smith (8-2)**	Kowalski (0-1)	**Nelson (6)**	23-9	12-6
April 17	Oral Roberts		Newman Outdoor Field	2-18	Coffey (1-0)	**Sankey (5-1)**	None	23-10	12-7
April 18	Oral Roberts		Newman Outdoor Field	Canceled, Weather				23-10	12-7
April 23	at South Dakota State		Erv Huether Field; Brookings, SD	5-0	**Drew (3-0)**	Mazur (0-1)	**Harm (5)**	24-10	13-7
April 23	at South Dakota State		Erv Huether Field	2-3	Sundquist (1-0)	**Nelson (0-1)**	None	24-11	13-8
April 24	at South Dakota State		Erv Huether Field	2-12^{(8)}	Carlson (1-0)	**Smtih (8-3)**	None	24-12	13-9
April 24	at South Dakota State		Erv Huether Field	13-12^{(10)}	**Drew (3-0)**	Mazur (0-1)	**Harm (5)**	25-12	14-9
April 27	Valley City State		Newman Outdoor Field	5-3^{(10)}	**Nelson (1-1)**	Suda (0-1)	None	26-12	-
April 30	at Kansas		Hoglund Ballpark; Lawrence, KS	5-3^{(10)}	**Nelson (2-1)**	Cyr (0-1)	**Drew (1)**	27-12	-

May (11-4)
Date	Opponent	Rank	Site/stadium	Score	Win	Loss	Save	Overall Record	Summit League Record
May 1	at Kansas		Hoglund Ballpark	2-10	Davis (1-0)	**Smith (8-4)**	None	27-13	-
May 2	at Kansas		Hoglund Ballpark	5-3	**Sankey (6-1)**	Barry (0-1)	**Drew (2)**	28-13	-
May 4	Mayville State		Newman Outdoor Field	6-2	**Koep (1-0)**	Taliaferro (0-1)	**Pilla (1)**	29-13	-
May 7	Omaha		Newman Outdoor Field	8-7	**Pilla (4-1)**	Blunt (0-1)	**Harm (6)**	30-13	15-9
May 7	Omaha		Newman Outdoor Field	2-0^{(7)}	**Loven (2-0)**	Maifeld (0-1)	None	31-13	16-9
May 8	Omaha		Newman Outdoor Field	8-7	**Drew (4-0)**	Koelewyn (0-1)	**Harm (7)**	32-13	17-9
May 9	omaha		Newman Outdoor Field	4-5	Timmins (1-0)	**Nelson (2-2)**	Mohler (1)	32-14	17-10
May 10	Concordia Moorhead		Newman Outdoor Field	8-7	**Sylte (1-0)**	Wiedeman (0-1)	**Zetterman (1)**	33-14	-
May 14	South Dakota State		Newman Outdoor Field	7-4	**Roehrich (1-1)**	Mazur (0-1)	**Harm (8)**	34-14	18-10
May 14	South Dakota State		Newman Outdoor Field	0-5	Beazley (1-0)	**Loven (2-1)**	Bourassa (1)	34-15	18-11
May 15	South Dakota State		Newman Outdoor Field	5-3	**Drew (5-0)**	Sundquist (0-1)	**Harm (9)**	35-15	19-11
May 16	South Dakota State		Newman Outdoor Field	10-4	**Feeney (5-1)**	Bishop (0-1)	None	36-15	20-11
May 20	at Eastern Kentucky		Turkey Hughes Field; Richmond, KY	3-15^{(7)}	Fox (1-0)	**Loven (2-2)**	None	36-16	-
May 21	at Eastern Kentucky		Turkey Hughes Field	8-1	**Sankey (7-1)**	Williams (0-1)	None	37-16	-
May 22	at Eastern Kentucky		Turkey Hughes Field	6-1	**Feeney (6-1)**	Laster (0-1)	None	38-16	-

Postseason (4-3)

Summit League Tournament (3-1)
Date	Opponent	Rank	Site/stadium	Score	Win	Loss	Save	Overall Record	Summit LeagueT Record
May 27	(3) Omaha	(2)	Tal Anderson Field; Omaha, NE	3-1	**Loven (3-2)**	Holetz (0-1)	**Harm (10)**	39-16	1-0
May 28	(1) Oral Roberts	(2)	Tal Anderson Field	5-0	**Feeney (7-1)**	Coffey (0-1)	**Smith (2)**	40-16	2-0
May 29	(1) Oral Roberts	(2)	Tal Anderson Field	5-15	Swift (1-0)	**Sankey (7-2)**	None	40-17	2-1
May 29	(1) Oral Roberts	(2)	Tal Anderson Field	11-6	**Roehrich (2-1)**	Rogen (0-1)	**Harm (11)**	41-17	3-1

Stanford Regional (1-2)
Date	Opponent	Rank	Site/stadium	Score	Win	Loss	Save	Overall Record	Stanford Regional Record
June 4	(1) #7 Stanford	(4)	Klein Field; Stanford, CA	1-9	Williams (1-0)	**Loven (3-3)**	None	41-18	0-1
June 5	(3) Nevada	(4)	Klein Field	6-1	**Feeney (8-1)**	Murillo (0-1)	**Harm (12)**	42-18	1-1
June 6	(2) #17 UC Irvine	(4)	Klein Field	3-18	Denholm (1-0)	**Sankey (7-3)**	None	42-19	1-2

- Win
- Loss
- Postponement
- Bold: Bison team member
- Rankings from D1Baseball.com:
- (#) Tournament seedings in parentheses.

=== Stanford Regional ===
Stanford Regional Teams
(1) Stanford Cardinal	(2) UC Irvine Anteaters	(3) Nevada Wolfpack	(4) North Dakota State Bison
