= 2025 Creighton Bluejays baseball team =

American college baseball team

2025 Creighton Bluejays baseball
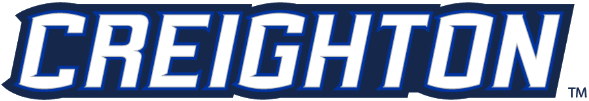

Big East regular season champions Big East Tournament champions

Fayetteville Regional, 2–2
- Conference: Big East Conference
- Record: 43–16 (17–4 Big East)
- Head coach: Ed Servais (22nd season)
- Assistant coaches: Mark Kingston; Billy Mohl Mike Current
- Home stadium: Charles Schwab Field Omaha

2025 Big East Conference baseball standings
	Conf.				Overall
Team	W		L	PCT	W		L	PCT
Creighton ‍†‍‡‍^{y}	17	–	4	.810	43	–	16	.729
UConn ‍†‍‍	17	–	4	.810	38	–	21	.644
Xavier ‍‍‍	14	–	7	.667	32	–	27	.542
St. John's ‍‍‍	13	–	8	.619	29	–	24	.547
Seton Hall ‍‍‍	10	–	11	.476	24	–	30	.444
Villanova ‍‍‍	6	–	15	.286	22	–	28	.440
Butler ‍‍‍	4	–	17	.190	15	–	39	.278
Georgetown ‍‍‍	3	–	18	.143	16	–	40	.286
† – Conference champion ‡ – Tournament champion y – Invited to the NCAA tournament As of June 1, 2025; Rankings from D1Baseball

The 2025 Creighton Bluejays baseball team represented Creighton University in the 2025 NCAA Division I baseball season. The Bluejays played their home games at Charles Schwab Field Omaha in Omaha, Nebraska. The team was led by head coach Ed Servais in his 22nd and final season in the position.

The team shared the Big East regular season championship with UConn and won the 2025 Big East Conference baseball tournament, thereby earning the Big East's automatic bid to the NCAA Tournament. They were assigned to the Fayetteville Regional, hosted by No. 3 national seed Arkansas at Baum–Walker Stadium. There, they defeated No. 25 Kansas and North Dakota State but lost to the hosts twice and were eliminated. They finished the season with a 43–16 record.

== Schedule and results ==
2025 Creighton Bluejays baseball game log (43–16)
Regular season (38–14)

February (4–3)
Date	Opponent	Rank	Site/stadium	Score	Win	Loss	Save	TV	Attendance	Overall record	Big East record
February 14 (DH-1)	at UNC Greensboro		UNCG Baseball Stadium; Greensboro, North Carolina	**L** 3–5	Murchison (1–0)	**Koosman** (0–1)	Chapman (1)		211	0–1	—
February 14 (DH-2)	at UNC Greensboro		UNCG Baseball Stadium	**L** 0–3	Miller (1–0)	**Hauser** (0–1)	Thompson Jr. (1)		211	0–2	—
February 16	at UNC Greensboro		UNCG Baseball Stadium	**W** 17–1 (7)	**Magers** (1–0)	Ready (0–1)			201	1–2	—
February 21 (DH-1)	at Portland		Joe Etzel Field; Portland, Oregon	**W** 5–2	**Aukerman** (1–0)	Gaston (0–2)	**Langrell** (1)		179	2–2	—
February 21 (DH-2)	at Portland		Joe Etzel Field	**L** 9–10	Rembisz (1–0)	**Magers** (1–1)	Swygart (1)		323	2–3	—
February 22	at Portland		Joe Etzel Field	**W** 6–3	**Langrell** (1–0)	Segel (0–1)			264	3–3	—
February 23	at Portland		Joe Etzel Field	Canceled due to rain							
February 28	at Charleston		CofC Baseball Stadium at Patriots Point; Mount Pleasant, South Carolina	**W** 8–6	**Aukerman** (2–0)	Brink (2–1)			633	4–3	—

March (12–4)
Date	Opponent	Rank	Site/stadium	Score	Win	Loss	Save	TV	Attendance	Overall record	Big East record
March 1	at Charleston		CofC Baseball Stadium at Patriots Point	**L** 6–18	Hunter (3–0)	**Koosman** (0–2)			794	4–4	—
March 2	at Charleston		CofC Baseball Stadium at Patriots Point	**W** 8–4	**Magers** (2–1)	Brooks (1–1)	**Langrell** (2)		656	5–4	—
March 5	at Kansas State		Tointon Family Stadium; Manhattan, Kansas	Canceled due to forecasted inclement weather							
March 8	UC Davis		Charles Schwab Field Omaha; Omaha, Nebraska	Canceled due to frozen field							
March 9 (DH-1)	UC Davis		Charles Schwab Field Omaha	**W** 9–3	**Aukerman** (3–0)	Frutchey (0–1)		FloBaseball	1,270	6–4	—
March 9 (DH-2)	UC Davis		Charles Schwab Field Omaha	**W** 4–0	**Burke** (4–0)	Valdez (1–1)		FloBaseball	1,270	7–4	—
March 11	Kansas State		Charles Schwab Field Omaha	**W** 9–8	**Koosman** (1–2)	Slack (0–2)	**Curtin** (1)		1,153	8–4	—
March 14	at San Francisco		Dante Benedetti Diamond at Max Ulrich Field; San Francisco, California	**L** 1–6	Holzemer (2–1)	**Burke** (1–1)	Pohorski (1)		207	8–5	—
March 15	at San Francisco		Dante Benedetti Diamond at Max Ulrich Field	**W** 5–2	**Curtin** (1–0)	Soberon (2–2)			177	9–5	—
March 16	at San Francisco		Dante Benedetti Diamond at Max Ulrich Field	**W** 7–1	**Magers** (3–1)	Risse (2–2)			137	10–5	—
March 18	South Dakota State		Charles Schwab Field Omaha	**W** 1–0	**Koosman** (2–2)	Augedahl (3–1)	**Langrell** (3)	FloBaseball	1,060	11–5	—
March 22	Saint Mary's		Charles Schwab Field Omaha	**L** 6–11	Delvecchio (2–0)	**Curtin** (1–1)		FloBaseball	1,405	11–6	—
March 23 (DH-1)	Saint Mary's		Charles Schwab Field Omaha	**W** 6–2 (7)	**Langrell** (2–0)	Kretsch (2–2)		FloBaseball	1,124	12–6	—
March 23 (DH-2)	Saint Mary's		Charles Schwab Field Omaha	**W** 6–5 (8)	**Aukerman** (4–0)	Emerling (1–3)		FloBaseball	1,124	13–6	—
March 25	at Omaha		Tal Anderson Field; Omaha, Nebraska	**W** 10–0 (7)	**Koosman** (3–2)	Foerstch (1–1)		Summit League Network	835	14–6	—
March 28	at Samford		Joe Lee Griffin Stadium; Birmingham, Alabama	**W** 6–5	**Langrell** (3–0)	Steckmesser (1–1)			578	15–6	—
March 29	at Samford		Joe Lee Griffin Stadium	**W** 11–8 (10)	**Aukerman** (5–0)	Malone (1–2)	**Langrell** (4)		418	16–6	—
March 30	at Samford		Joe Lee Griffin Stadium	**L** 0–5	Blasche (3–0)	**Magers** (3–2)			311	16–7	—

April (12–6)
Date	Opponent	Rank	Site/stadium	Score	Win	Loss	Save	TV	Attendance	Overall record	Big East record
April 1	at Nebraska		Haymarket Park; Lincoln, Nebraska	**W** 9–5	**Burke** (2–1)	Nowaczyk (0–1)	**Langrell** (5)	B1G+	4,392	17–7	—
April 4	UConn		Charles Schwab Field Omaha	**L** 7–8	Pudvar (4–1)	**Cancellieri** (0–1)	Afthim (1)		1,089	17–8	0–1
April 5	UConn		Charles Schwab Field Omaha	**W** 14–2	**Pineau** (1–0)	Suchy (3–4)			1,445	18–8	1–1
April 6	UConn		Charles Schwab Field Omaha	**W** 11–7	**Aukerman** (6–0)	Finn (2–1)	**Langrell** (6)		1,167	19–8	2–1
April 8	North Dakota State		Charles Schwab Field Omaha	**L** 2–3	Wiegart (1–0)	**Langrell** (3–1)	Lachenmayer (1)		1,265	19–9	—
April 11	at Seton Hall		Owen T. Carroll Field; South Orange, New Jersey	Postponed to Sunday (as part of a seven-inning doubleheader) due to rain							
April 12	Seton Hall		Owen T. Carroll Field	**L** 6–8	Reich (1–6)	**Koosman** (3–3)	Downing (1)		289	19–10	2–2
April 13 (DH-1)	Seton Hall		Owen T. Carroll Field	**W** 7–3 (7)	**Langrell** (4–1)	Curry (2–2)			301	20–10	3–2
April 13 (DH-2)	Seton Hall		Owen T. Carroll Field	**L** 6–7 (7)	Frontera (2–2)	**Curtin** (1–2)			305	20–11	3–3
April 15	Nebraska		Charles Schwab Field Omaha	**L** 3–6	Bender (2–0)	**Unga** (0–1)	Broderick (1)	Fox Sports 1	5,846	20–12	—
April 17	St. John's		Charles Schwab Field Omaha	**W** 12–8	**Koosman** (4–3)	Falcon (1–2)	**Langrell** (7)		924	21–12	4–3
April 18	St. John's		Charles Schwab Field Omaha	**W** 4–3	**Burke** (3–1)	Chase (0–3)	**Wendt** (1)		1,281	22–12	5–3
April 19	St. John's		Charles Schwab Field Omaha	**W** 4–3	**Burke** (4–1)	Frederick (2–1)	**Langrell** (8)		1,442	23–12	6–3
April 22	North Dakota State		Charles Schwab Field Omaha	**W** 5–2	**Koosman** (5–3)	Wilson (0–2)	**Wendt** (2)		982	24–12	—
April 23	vs. South Dakota State		Sioux Falls Stadium; Sioux Falls, South Dakota	**W** 12–2 (7)	**Prindl** (1–0)	Jirschele (0–1)			213	25–12	—
April 25	Villanova		Charles Schwab Field Omaha	**W** 3–2 (12)	**Langrell** (5–1)	Sachais (4–4)			1,040	26–12	7–3
April 26	Villanova		Charles Schwab Field Omaha	**W** 6–3	**Pineau** (2–0)	Francis (2–5)	**Burke** (1)		2,788	27–12	8–3
April 27	Villanova		Charles Schwab Field Omaha	**W** 12–3	**Magers** (4–2)	Olsen (1–4)	**Koosman** (1)		3,116	28–12	9–3
April 29	Omaha		Charles Schwab Field Omaha	**L** 5–11	Gainer (6–3)	**Wendt** (0–1)			8,610	28–13	—

May (10–1)
Date	Opponent	Rank	Site/stadium	Score	Win	Loss	Save	TV	Attendance	Overall record	Big East record
May 2	at Butler		Bulldog Park; Indianapolis, Indiana	**W** 12–7	**Aukerman** (7–0)	Rosser (2–3)			550	29–13	10–3
May 3	at Butler		Bulldog Park	**W** 13–1	**Pineau** (3–0)	Goodpaster (3–4)			303	30–13	11–3
May 4	at Butler		Bulldog Park	**W** 16–4	**Magers** (5–2)	Snyder (0–5)			222	31–13	12–3
May 6	at Nebraska		Haymarket Park	**W** 8–7	**Koosman** (6–3)	Walsh (4–7)	**Langrell** (9)		5,802	32–13	—
May 9	Xavier		Charles Schwab Field Omaha	**W** 6–3	**Cancellieri** (1–1)	Schmidt (2–4)			4,317	33–13	13–3
May 10	Xavier		Charles Schwab Field Omaha	**W** 6–5	**Langrell** (6–1)	Hoskins (3–4)			3,113	34–13	14–3
May 11	Xavier		Charles Schwab Field Omaha	**L** 2–4	Piech (4–1)	**Koosman** (6–4)	Hooker (1)		2,150	34–14	14–4
May 13	at Omaha		Tal Anderson Field	**W** 19–3 (7)	**Burke** (5–1)	Cychosz (0–1)			1,486	35–14	—
May 15	at Georgetown		Capital One Park; Tysons, Virginia	**W** 5–3	**Cancellieri** (2–1)	Raab (4–3)	**Langrell** (10)		247	36–14	15–4
May 16	at Georgetown		Capital One Park	**W** 8–6	**Koosman** (7–4)	O'Connor (3–4)	**Aukerman** (1)		277	37–14	16–4
May 17	at Georgetown		Capital One Park	**W** 12–1	**Magers** (6–2)	Williams (3–5)			377	38–14	17–4

Postseason (5–2)

Big East Tournament (3–0)
Date	Opponent	Seed	Site/stadium	Score	Win	Loss	Save	TV	Attendance	Overall record	Big East Tournament record
May 21	vs. (4) St. John's	(1)	Prasco Park; Mason, Ohio	**W** 10–8	**Aukerman** (8–0)	Chaffee (1–5)	**Langrell** (11)			39–14	1–0
May 22	vs. (3) Xavier	(1)	Prasco Park	**W** 11–8	**Koosman** (8–4)	Wylie (1–1)	**Magers** (1)		2,928	40–14	2–0
May 24	vs. (2) UConn	(1)	Prasco Park	**W** 7–4	**Strenke** (1–0)	Cooke (2–5)	**Langrell** (12)	Fox Sports 1	4,683	41–14	3–0

Fayetteville Regional (2–2)
Date	Opponent	Seed	Site/stadium	Score	Win	Loss	Save	TV	Attendance	Overall record	NCAAT record
May 30	vs. (2) No. 25 Kansas	(3)	Baum–Walker Stadium; Fayetteville, Arkansas	**W** 11–4	**Koosman** (9–4)	Voegele (7–5)		ESPN+	9,681	42–14	1–0
May 31	at (1) No. 6 Arkansas	(3)	Baum–Walker Stadium	**L** 1–12	Root (7–5)	**Magers** (6–3)		ESPN+	10,115	42–15	1–1
June 1	vs. (4) North Dakota State	(3)	Baum–Walker Stadium	**W** 11–10	**Langrell** (7–1)	Lachenmayer (2–4)		ESPN+	9,588	43–15	2–1
June 1	at (1) No. 6 Arkansas	(3)	Baum–Walker Stadium	**L** 3–8	Wood (3–1)	**Langrell** (7–2)	Gaeckle (1)	SEC Network	9,946	43–16	2–2

- Win
- Loss
- Postponement or cancellation
- Bold: Creighton player
- Rankings from D1Baseball.com.
- (#) Tournament seedings in parentheses.
