= Rob Bishop (baseball) =

American college baseball coach

Current position
- Title: Head coach
- Team: South Dakota State
- Conference: Summit League
- Record: 203–269

Playing career
- 1991–1994: Jamestown College

Coaching career (HC unless noted)
- 1998–1999: South Dakota State (GA)
- 2000: Huron
- 2001–2010: Miles Community College
- 2011–2016: Montana State Billings
- 2017–present: South Dakota State

Head coaching record
- Overall: 375–422–1 (NCAA); 377–151 (NJCAA); 38–18 (NAIA)
- Tournaments: Summit: 10–11; NCAA: 0–3

Accomplishments and honors

Championships
- SDIC Regular Season (2000); 10x MonDak Regular Season (2001-10); NJCAA World Series Appearance (2007); 2x GNAC Regular Season (2015–16); Summit League tournament (2026)

Awards
- SDIC Coach of the Year (2000)

Rob Bishop is an American college baseball coach and former player. Bishop is the head coach of the South Dakota State Jackrabbits baseball team.

== Playing career ==
Bishop enrolled at Jamestown College, to play college baseball for the Knights baseball team. As a senior in 1994, Bishop hit .439. As a sophomore in 1992 and as a senior in 1994, Bishop was named a National Association of Intercollegiate Athletics (NAIA) All-American.

== Coaching career ==
Bishop began his coaching career a graduate assistant for the South Dakota State Jackrabbits baseball team. In 2000, Bishop received his first head coaching job at Huron University. In Bishop's lone season at Huron, he led the Screaming Eagles to a South Dakota Intercollegiate Conference (SDIC) title as well as was named the Coach of the Year. Bishop then moved on to Miles Community College, who was reviving their baseball program. Bishop led Miles to a Mon-Dak Conference championship every season he was at Miles (2001–2010). In the Fall 2010, Bishop was hired as the head baseball coach at the Montana State University Billings.

On August 1, 2016, Bishop was named the head coach at South Dakota State.

== Head coaching record ==
The following is a record of Bishop's record at 4-year institutions.

Record table
Season	Team	Overall	Conference	Standing	Postseason
Huron Screaming Eagles (South Dakota Intercollegiate Conference) (2000)
2000	Huron	38–18	–	1st	
Huron NAIA:		38–18	–		
Miles Community College Pioneers (MonDak Conference) (2001–2010)
Miles Community College (NJCAA):		377–151	NJCAA World Series Appearance (2007)		
Montana State Billings Yellowjackets (Great Northwest Athletic Conference) (2011–2016)
2011	Montana State Billings	18–29	9–23	4th	
2012	Montana State Billings	22–24	13–19	3rd	Great Northwest tournament
2013	Montana State Billings	21–27–1	17–14	3rd	Great Northwest tournament
2014	Montana State Billings	16–30	13–19	5th	
2015	Montana State Billings	27–23	22–10	1st	Great Northwest tournament
2016	Montana State Billings	30–20	23–15	T-1st	Great Northwest tournament
Montana State Billings:		172–153–1	97–100		
South Dakota State Jackrabbits (Summit League) (2017–present)
2017	South Dakota State	26–24	18–12	3rd	Summit League tournament
2018	South Dakota State	18–32	14–13	4th	Summit League tournament
2019	South Dakota State	28–22	19–10	2nd	Summit League tournament
2020	South Dakota State	5–12	0–0		Season canceled due to COVID-19
2021	South Dakota State	15–32	9–19	4th	Summit League tournament
2022	South Dakota State	22–23	13–9	3rd	
2023	South Dakota State	24–28	13–11	3rd	Summit League tournament
2024	South Dakota State	20–29	11–17	6th	
2025	South Dakota State	21–34	13–15	3rd	Summit League tournament
2026	South Dakota State	24–33	12–15	4th	NCAA tournament
South Dakota State:		203–269	122–121		
Total:		375–422–1			
National champion Postseason invitational champion Conference regular season champion Conference regular season and conference tournament champion Division regular season champion Division regular season and conference tournament champion Conference tournament champion

== See also ==
- List of current NCAA Division I baseball coaches
