= 2024 North Dakota State Bison baseball team =

American college baseball season

2024 North Dakota State Bison baseball
- Conference: Summit League
- Record: 20–30–1 (14–12–1 Summit)
- Head coach: Tyler Oakes (3rd season)
- Assistant coaches: Brandon Hunt; Tanner Neale; Trent Keefer
- Home stadium: Newman Outdoor Field

2024 Summit League baseball standings
	Conf.						Overall
Team	W		L		T	PCT	W		L		T	PCT
St. Thomas* ‍†‍‍	16	–	10	–	0	.615	22	–	23	–	0	.489
Omaha ‍‍‍	16	–	13	–	1	.550	18	–	32	–	1	.363
North Dakota State ‍‍‍	14	–	12	–	1	.537	20	–	30	–	1	.402
Oral Roberts ‍‍‡‍^{y}	13	–	15	–	1	.466	27	–	30	–	1	.474
Northern Colorado ‍‍‍	13	–	16	–	1	.450	14	–	36	–	1	.284
South Dakota State ‍‍‍	11	–	17	–	0	.393	20	–	29	–	0	.408
† – Conference champion ‡ – Tournament champion y – Invited to the NCAA Tournament * Ineligible for the 2024 NCAA tournament due to transition from Division III; As of May 25, 2024; Rankings from D1Baseball

The 2024 North Dakota State Bison baseball team represented North Dakota State University during the 2024 NCAA Division I baseball season. The Bison played home games at Newman Outdoor Field on NDSU's campus. The team was coached by third year head coach Tyler Oakes.
The Bison finished the season with a 20–30–1 overall record and a 14–12–1 record, which was good for third in the Summit League. NDSU made the Summit League tournament as the second seed, since regular season winner St. Thomas was ineligible, and played Oral Roberts in the first round. The Bison would fall to the Golden Eagles, defeat top-seeded Omaha in the first elimination game, but fell to Northern Colorado in extra innings in the second elimination game.

== Previous season ==
The Bison finished the 2023 season with a 23–30 overall record, and a 16–7 record in the Summit League - which was good for second in the league. In the Summit League tournament, which was the first tournament NDSU had held at Newman Outdoor Field in the Division I era, the Bison lost to South Dakota State, beat Omaha, but fell to South Dakota State again in the final elimination game.

== Personnel ==
=== Roster ===
2024 North Dakota State Roster
Pitchers: 12 – Matt Sargeant – Freshman; 13 – Roman Trapani – Freshman; 16 – Nolan Johnson – RS Sophomore; 20 – Logan Knight – Junior; 22 – Hayden Sylte – RS Junior; 24 – Hunter Rosenbaum – Senior; 25 – Parker Puetz – Sophomore; 27 – Julien Hachem – Sophomore; 28 – Ben Soke – Freshman; 29 – Ben Berkhof – Freshman; 30 – Reese Ligtenberg – RS Junior; 31 – Seth Thompson – Junior; 32 – Andrew Baumgart – RS Sophomore; 33 – Landon Koenig – Freshman; 34 – Joey Danielson – Senior; 35 – Leland Wilson – RS Junior; 36 – Colbey Klepper – Senior; 37 – Cole Mahlum – Junior; 38 – Alex Karns – Junior; 40 – Austin Bergum – Junior; 44 – Skyler Riedinger – RS Junior	Catchers: 7 – Will Busch – Senior; 15 – Bennett Freiter – RS Sophomore; Infielders: 4 – Jake Schaffner – Freshman; 5 – Davis Hamilton – Sophomore; 6 – James Dunlap – Senior; 9 – Garret Hill – Senior; 10 – Luis Garcia – Junior; 11 – Jack Steil – Senior; 17 – Zach Kluvers – RS Junior; 18 – Aiden Schenk – Freshman; 26 – Carson Hake – Senior	Outfielders: 3 – Kyle Law – Sophomore; 8 – Sam Canton – Junior; 14 – Colten Becker – Junior; 19 – Cadyn Schwabe – Senior; Utility: 1 – Noah Gordon (C/UTIL) – Freshman; 2 – Blake Timmons (OF/INF) – Freshman

=== Coaching staff ===
2024 North Dakota State Coaching Staff
Name	Position
Tyler Oakes	Head coach
Brandon Hunt	Assistant Coach
Tanner Neale	Assistant Coach
Trent Keefer	Assistant Coach

== Schedule and results ==
2024 North Dakota State Bison baseball game log
Regular season (19–28–1)

February (2–6)
Date	Opponent	Rank	Site/stadium	Score	Win	Loss	Save	Attendance	Overall record	Summit League Record
February 16	at UC Irvine		Cicerone Field at Anteater Ballpark; Irvine, CA	2–14	Pinto (1–0)	**Puetz (0–1)**	None	826	0–1	–
February 17	at UC Irvine		Cicerone Field at Anteater Ballpark	2–7	Luu (1–0)	**Knight (0–1)**	None	745	0–2	–
February 18	at UC Irvine		Cicerone Field at Anteater Ballpark	4–10	Brooks (1–0)	**Koenig (0–1)**	None	718	0–3	–
February 20	at Long Beach State		Blair Field; Long Beach, CA	Canceled, Field Conditions					0–3	–
February 21	at Cal Poly		Baggett Stadium; San Luis Obispo, CA	4–5	Sagouspe (1–0)	**Danielson (0–1)**	None	1,185	0–4	–
February 23	at Pacific		Klein Family Field; Stockton, CA	6–7	Martinez (1–0)	**Riedinger (0–1)**	None	302	0–5	–
February 24	at Pacific		Klein Family Field	9–7	**Wilson (1–0)**	Cruz (0–1)	None	500	1–5	–
February 25	at Pacific		Klein Family Field	6–4	**Bergum (1–0)**	Carter (0–2)	None	450	2–5	–
February 29	at No. 6 Oregon State		Goss Stadium at Coleman Field; Corvallis, OR	7–19^{(7)}	Hutcheson (1–1)	**Ligtenburg (0–1)**	None	3,193	2–6	–

March (5–10)
Date	Opponent	Rank	Site/stadium	Score	Win	Loss	Save	Attendance	Overall Record	Summit League Record
March 1	at No. 6 Oregon State		Goss Stadium at Coleman Field; Corvallis, OR	5–6	Holmes (2–0)	**Danielson (0–2)**	None	3,191	2–7	–
March 2	at No. 6 Oregon State		Goss Stadium at Coleman Field	0–10^{(8)}	Kmatz (2–0)	**Knight (0–2)**	None	3,332	2–8	–
March 3	at No. 6 Oregon State		Goss Stadium at Coleman Field	7–13	Segura (2–0)	**Koenig (0–2)**	None	3,308	2–9	–
March 9	at Southeastern Louisiana		Pat Kenelly Diamond at Alumni Field; Hammond, LA	6–3	**Johnson (1–0)**	Stuprich (1–2)	**Danielson (1)**	1,396	3–9	–
March 9	at Southeastern Louisiana		Pat Kenelly Diamond at Alumni Field	6–8	Polk (3–0)	**Wilson (1–1)**	Rodriguez (1)	1,115	3–10	–
March 10	at Southeastern Louisiana		Pat Kenelly Diamond at Alumni Field	10–11	Fabre (1–0)	**Danielson (0–3)**	None	1,287	3–11	–
March 12	at No. 2 LSU		Alex Box Stadium; Baton Rouge, LA	1–6	Loer (1–0)	**Wilson (1–2)**	Coleman (1)	9,909	3–12	–
March 13	at No. 2 LSU		Alex Box Stadium	0–7	Hellmers (1–0)	**Sargeant (0–1)**	None	9,833	3–13	–
March 15	at Omaha		Tal Anderson Field; Omaha, NE	4–1	**Johnson (2–0)**	Bell (0–2)	**Danielson (2)**	497	4–13	1–0
March 16	at Omaha		Tal Anderson Field	4–7	Hackmann (1–0)	**Bergum (0–1)**	Gainer (2)	365	4–14	1–1
March 16	at Omaha		Tal Anderson Field	8–5	**Karns (1–0)**	Byhre (0–3)	**Danielson (3)**	365	5–14	2–1
March 20	at Nebraska		Haymarket Park; Lincoln, NE	1–3	Walsh (2–0)	**Trapani (0–1)**	Sanders (1)	3,991	5–15	–
March 22	at Oral Roberts		J. L. Johnson Stadium; Tulsa, OK	3–7	Hall (2–2)	**Karns (1–1)**	None	963	5–16	2–2
March 23	at Oral Roberts		J. L. Johnson Stadium	8–5	**Knight (1–2)**	Caravalho (0–2)	**Danielson (4)**	867	6–16	3–2
March 24	at Oral Roberts		J. L. Johnson Stadium	8–6	**Ligtenberg (1–1)**	Carmack (1–3)	**Danielson (5)**	832	7–16	4–2
March 28	at St. Thomas		Koch Diamond; St. Paul, MN	Postponed – Field Conditions					–	–
March 29	at St. Thomas		Koch Diamond	Postponed – Field Conditions					–	–
March 30	at St. Thomas		Koch Diamond	Postponed – Field Conditions					–	–

April (6–7–1)
Date	Opponent	Rank	Site/stadium	Score	Win	Loss	Save	Attendance	Overall Record	Summit League Record
April 3	at Creighton		Charles Schwab Field Omaha; Omaha, NE	7–8	Primeaux (1–0)	**Hachem (4–1)**	Burke (1)	1,167	7–17	–
April 5	South Dakota State		Newman Outdoor Field; Fargo, ND	1–5	McCay (3–0)	**Wilson (1–3)**	None	570	7–18	4–3
April 6	South Dakota State		Newman Outdoor Field	9–8	**Knight (2–2)**	Peters (0–2)	None	492	8–18	5–3
April 6	South Dakota State		Newman Outdoor Field	7–11	Goble (3–4)	**Karns (1–2)**	None	492	8–19	5–4
April 9	at Minnesota		Siebert Field; Minneapolis, MN	3–11	Kennedy (1–0)	**Hachem (0–2)**	None	513	8–20	–
April 12	at Northern Colorado		Jackson Field; Greeley, CO	12–13	Gienger (1–2)	**Danielson (0–3)**	None	221	8–21	5–5
April 13	at Northern Colorado		Jackson Field	3–2	**Knight (3–2)**	Gibson (1–4)	**Danielson (6)**	115	9–21	6–5
April 14	at Northern Colorado		Jackson Field	11–3	**Koenig (1–2)**	Tuttle (0–1)	None	110	10–21	7–5
April 16	at Minnesota		Siebert Field	Canceled, Inclement Weather					–	–
April 20	Oral Roberts		Newman Outdoor Field	3–10	Hall (5–2)	**Wilson (1–4)**	None	276	10–22	7–6
April 20	Oral Roberts		Newman Outdoor Field	7–6	**Riedinger (1–1)**	Patten (1–1)	None	276	11–22	8–6
April 21	Oral Roberts		Newman Outdoor Field	5–4	**Danielson (1–4)**	Patten (1–2)	None	293	12–22	9–6
April 23	Mayville State		Newman Outdoor Field	13–3^{(7)}	**Ligtenberg (2–1)**	Thompson (2–3)	None	252	13–22	–
April 27	Omaha		Newman Outdoor Field	6–7	Bell (2–5)	**Wilson (1–5)**	Gainer (4)	181	13–23	9–7
April 27	Omaha		Newman Outdoor Field	3–6	Caleb (5–1)	**Knight (3–3)**	Mattingley (1)	181	13–24	9–8
April 28	Omaha		Newman Outdoor Field	2–2	None – Tie			145	13–24–1	9–8–1

May (6–3)
Date	Opponent	Rank	Site/stadium	Score	Win	Loss	Save	Attendance	Overall Record	Summit League Record
May 1	at Iowa		Duane Banks Field; Iowa City, IA	21–14	**Sargeant (1–1)**	Beuter (1–3)	**Danielson (7)**	925	14–24–1	–
May 3	St. Thomas		Newman Outdoor Field	3–11	Esch (4–2)	**Wilson (1–6)**	None	268	14–25–1	9–9–1
May 4	St. Thomas		Newman Outdoor Field	7–4	**Knight (4–3)**	Retz (2–3)	**Danielson (8)**	352	15–25–1	10–9–1
May 5	St. Thomas		Newman Outdoor Field	5–4	**Thompson (1–0)**	Gartner (3–4)	**Danielson (9)**	279	16–25–1	11–9–1
May 10	at South Dakota State		Erv Huether Field; Brookings, SD	11–10	**Karns (2–2)**	Clemons (4–4)	**Danielson (11)**	241	17–25–1	12–9–1
May 11	at South Dakota State		Erv Huether Field	7–6^{(11)}	**Thompson (2–0)**	Driessen (2–3)	**Rosenbaum (1)**	306	18–25–1	13–9–1
May 12	at South Dakota State		Erv Huether Field	5–8	Kent (3–4)	**Hachem (0–3)**	Schlecht (1)	175	18–26–1	13–10–1
May 16	Northern Colorado		Newman Outdoor Field	9–3	**Knight (5–3)**	Smith (2–10)	None	156	19–26–1	14–10–1
May 17	Northern Colorado		Newman Outdoor Field	2–5	Gienger (5–3)	**Koenig (1–3)**	Carvajal (2)	323	19–27–1	14–11–1
May 18	Northern Colorado		Newman Outdoor Field	12–18	Storey (2–4)	**Sargeant (1–2)**	None	281	19–28–1	14–12–1

Postseason (1–2)

Summit League Tournament (1–2)
Date	Opponent	Rank	Site/stadium	Score	Win	Loss	Save	Attendance	Overall Record	Summit League Tournament Record
May 22	vs. (3) Oral Roberts	(2)	J. L. Johnson Stadium; Tulsa, OK	3–11	Hall (9–2)	**Knight (5–4)**	None	627	19–29–1	0–1
May 23	vs. (1) Omaha; Elimination Game	(2)	J. L. Johnson Stadium	7–5	**Riedinger (2–1)**	Dreher (0–2)	None	519	20–29–1	1–1
May 24	vs. (4) Northern Colorado; Elimination Game	(2)	J. L. Johnson Stadium	9–10^{(10)}	Carvajal (3–0)	**Danielson (1–5)**	None	421	20–30–1	1–2

- Win
- Loss
- Postponement
- Bold: Bison team member
- Rankings from D1Baseball.com:
- (#) Tournament seedings in parentheses.
