= 2025 Villanova Wildcats baseball team =

Season of Villanova Wildcats baseball team

2025 Villanova Wildcats baseball
- Conference: Big East Conference
- Record: 22–28 (6–15 Big East)
- Head coach: Kevin Mulvey (1st season)
- Assistant coach: Jack O'Reilly
- Hitting coach: Eddie Brown (7th season)
- Pitching coach: Jabin Weaver (6th season)
- Home stadium: Villanova Ballpark at Plymouth

2025 Big East Conference baseball standings
	Conf.				Overall
Team	W		L	PCT	W		L	PCT
Creighton ‍†‍‡‍^{y}	17	–	4	.810	43	–	16	.729
UConn ‍†‍‍	17	–	4	.810	38	–	21	.644
Xavier ‍‍‍	14	–	7	.667	32	–	27	.542
St. John's ‍‍‍	13	–	8	.619	29	–	24	.547
Seton Hall ‍‍‍	10	–	11	.476	24	–	30	.444
Villanova ‍‍‍	6	–	15	.286	22	–	28	.440
Butler ‍‍‍	4	–	17	.190	15	–	39	.278
Georgetown ‍‍‍	3	–	18	.143	16	–	40	.286
† – Conference champion ‡ – Tournament champion y – Invited to the NCAA tournament As of June 1, 2025; Rankings from D1Baseball

The 2025 Villanova Wildcats baseball team represents Villanova University during the 2025 NCAA Division I baseball season. The Wildcats play their home games at Villanova Ballpark at Plymouth as a member of the Big East Conference. The team is led by head coach Kevin Mulvey in his eighth season.

== Previous season ==
The 2024 Villanova Wildcats finished the season with an overall record of 17–37 and a conference record of 8–13, failing to qualify for the 2024 NCAA Division I baseball tournament.

== Roster ==
2025 Villanova Wildcats baseball team
Players
Coaches

#	Pos.	Name	B/T	Height	Weight	Year	Home town
1	UTL	JoJo Montgomery	R/R	6 ft 0 in (1.83 m)	193 lb (88 kg)	Fr	Buford, GA
43	RHP	Graham Moore	R/R	6 ft 2 in (1.88 m)	185 lb (84 kg)	Jr	Jacksonville, FL

Head coach

Kevin Mulvey

Assistant coach(es)

- Eddie Brown (Associate Head Coach/Hitting/Infield)
- Jabin Weaver (Pitching/Recruiting)
- Jack O'Reilly (Assistant Coach).
- Jack Mahoney (Director of Operations)

Legend

- (C) Team captain
- (S) Suspended
- (I) Ineligible
- Injured
- Current redshirt

Roster
Last update: February 22, 2025
