= 2025 UConn Huskies baseball team =

American college baseball season

2025 UConn Huskies baseball

Big East Conference regular season champions
- Conference: Big East Conference
- Record: 38–21 (17–4 Big East)
- Head coach: Jim Penders (22nd season)
- Assistant coaches: Jeff Hourigan (14th season); Joshua McDonald (14th season); Chris Podeszwa (22nd season)
- Home stadium: Elliot Ballpark

2025 Big East Conference baseball standings
	Conf.				Overall
Team	W		L	PCT	W		L	PCT
Creighton ‍†‍‡‍^{y}	17	–	4	.810	43	–	16	.729
UConn ‍†‍‍	17	–	4	.810	38	–	21	.644
Xavier ‍‍‍	14	–	7	.667	32	–	27	.542
St. John's ‍‍‍	13	–	8	.619	29	–	24	.547
Seton Hall ‍‍‍	10	–	11	.476	24	–	30	.444
Villanova ‍‍‍	6	–	15	.286	22	–	28	.440
Butler ‍‍‍	4	–	17	.190	15	–	39	.278
Georgetown ‍‍‍	3	–	18	.143	16	–	40	.286
† – Conference champion ‡ – Tournament champion y – Invited to the NCAA tournament As of June 1, 2025; Rankings from D1Baseball

The 2025 UConn Huskies baseball team represented the University of Connecticut in the 2025 NCAA Division I baseball season. The Huskies played their home games at Elliot Ballpark on campus in Storrs, Connecticut. The team is coached by Jim Penders, in his 22nd season at UConn. They played as members of the Big East Conference.

The Huskies finished the regular season with a 17–4 conference record, claiming a share of the Big East title. They entered the 2025 Big East Conference baseball tournament as the second seed, as Creighton claimed a tiebreaker from an early season series. UConn finished the tournament 2–2 and was not included in the NCAA Tournament field.

== Previous season ==
The 2024 Huskies finished with a record of 35–26, 17–4 in the Big East. They won the Big East regular season and finished fourth in the Tournament. They were seeded third in the NCAA Norman Regional. They won the regional, defeating Duke once and host Oklahoma twice to advance to the Tallahassee Super Regional. They were defeated in two games in their third overall appearance (and second in three years) in a Super Regional by eventual College World Series semifinalist Florida State.

== Personnel ==
=== Roster ===
2025 Connecticut Huskies roster
Pitchers: 10 - Jude Abbadessa - Redshirt Sophomore; 12 - Sean Finn - Sophomore; 13 - Charlie West - Sophomore; 15 - Hector Alejandro - Redshirt Senior; 18 - Jack Sullivan - Senior; 20 - Evan Hamberger - Junior; 21 - Gabe Van Emon - Graduate Student; 22 - Ian Cooke - Senior; 25 - Thomas Ellisen - Redshirt Junior; 30 - Frank Spirito IV - Redshirt Freshman; 31 - Devin Wolff - Redshirt Freshman; 32 - Cole Taylor - Freshman; 34 - Brady Afthim - Senior; 36 - Paxton Meyers - Graduate Student; 37 - Sam Hutchinson - Sophomore; 38 - JT Caruso - Sophomore; 39 - Kyle Peters - Redshirt Freshman; 40 - Drew Smith - Freshman; 41 - Greg Shaw III - Junior; 44 - Ben Schild - Sophomore; 45 - Cayden Suchy - Freshman; 46 - Oliver Pudvar - Redshirt Sophomore; 49 - Cameron Mayer - Graduate Student; 50 - Owen Norrell - Freshman; 51 - Giovanni Conte - Redshirt Freshman; 54 - Thomas Galusha - Redshirt Freshman; 55 - Garret Garbinski - Junior	Catchers: 5 - Matt Garbowski - Senior; 11 - Connor Lane - Freshman; 42 - Gabriel Tirado - Freshman; Outfielders: 4 - Sam Biller - Graduate Student; 9 - Caleb Shpur - Graduate Student; 23 - Carter Groen - Sophomore; 24 - Beau Root - Graduate Student	Infielders: 1 - Bryan Padilla - Graduate Student; 2 - Tyler Minick - Sophomore; 3 - Rob Rispoli - Redshirt Freshman; 8 - Jack LaRose - Freshman; 26 - Grant MacArthur - Junior; 43 - Maddix Dalena - Junior; Utility: 7 - Ryan Daniels - Junior; 47 - Anthony Belisario - Freshman; 52 - Aidan Dougherty - Junior

=== Coaches ===
2025 Connecticut Huskies baseball coaching staff
- 16 – Jim Penders – Head coach – 22nd season
- 29 – Jeff Hourigan – Assistant coach/Recruiting coordinator – 14th season
- 33 – Joshua MacDonald – Assistant coach – 14th season
- 14 – Chris Podeszwa – Volunteer assistant coach – 22nd season

== Schedule ==
Legend
	UConn win
	UConn loss
	Cancellation
**Bold**	UConn team member
*	Non-Conference game

2025 Connecticut Huskies baseball game log (35–21)
Regular season (33–19)

February (1–6)
Date	Opponent	Rank	Site/Stadium	Score	Win	Loss	Save	Attendance	Overall Record	BE Record
Feb 14	vs Stetson*		Parque Yldefonso Solá Morales • Caguas, Puerto Rico (Puerto Rico Challenge)	**L** 6–10	Gorelick (1–0)	**Suchy (0–1)**	None	650	0–1	
Feb 15	vs Missouri*		Parque Yldefonso Solá Morales • Caguas, Puerto Rico (Puerto Rico Challenge)	**L** 7–11	Jacobi (1–0)	**Cooke (0–1)**	None	431	0–2	
Feb 16	vs Penn State*		Parque Yldefonso Solá Morales • Caguas, Puerto Rico (Puerto Rico Challenge)	**L** 6–7	DeSanto (1–0)	**Ellison (0–1)**	DeMell (1)	559	0–3	
Feb 21	at Florida Atlantic*		FAU Baseball Stadium • Boca Raton, FL	**L** 4–5	Andrews (1–0)	**Suchy (0–2)**	Bollinger (1)	477	0–4	
Feb 22	at Florida Atlantic*		FAU Baseball Stadium • Boca Raton, FL	**L** 17–25	Martzolf (1–0)	**Cooke (0–2)**	None	601	0–5	
Feb 23	at Florida Atlantic*		FAU Baseball Stadium • Boca Raton, FL	**W** 5–3^{10}	**Afthim (1–0)**	Bollinger (0–1)	None	531	1–5	
Feb 28	at USC*		OC Great Park Baseball Complex • Irvine, CA (Dodger Classic)	**L** 5–8	Hunter (2–0)	**Suchy (0–3)**	Govel (1)	879	1–6	

March (10–9)
Date	Opponent	Rank	Site/Stadium	Score	Win	Loss	Save	Attendance	Overall Record	BE Record
Mar 1	at UCLA*		Jackie Robinson Stadium • Los Angeles, CA (Dodger Classic)	**L** 6–8	Bott (1–0)	**Cooke (0–3)**	Moss (2)	427	1–7	
Mar 2	vs No. 14 Vanderbilt*		Jackie Robinson Stadium • Los Angeles, CA (Dodger Classic)	**W** 6–2	**Ellison (1–1)**	Bowker (1–1)	None	290	2–7	
Mar 7	at Miami (FL)*		Alex Rodriguez Park at Mark Light Field • Coral Gables, FL	**W** 7–2	**Pudvar (1–0)**	Robert (2–2)	None	2,965	3–7	
Mar 8	at Miami (FL)*		Alex Rodriguez Park at Mark Light Field • Coral Gables, FL	**W** 12–8	**Suchy (1–3)**	Hugus (2–2)	None	2,865	4–7	
Mar 9	at Miami (FL)*		Alex Rodriguez Park at Mark Light Field • Coral Gables, FL	**L** 11–15	Smith (1–0)	**Ellisen (1–2)**	None	2,812	4–8	
Mar 11	LIU*		Elliot Ballpark • Storrs, CT	**W** 11–1^{7}	**Galusha (1–0)**	Francisco (0–1)	None	519	5–8	
Mar 14	at Campbell*		Jim Perry Stadium • Buies Creek, NC	**W** 6–5	**Pudvar (2–0)**	Murray (1–2)	**Afthim (1)**	750	6–8	
Mar 15 (DH Game 1)	at Campbell*		Jim Perry Stadium • Buies Creek, NC	**L** 6–7^{10}	Schares (1–0)	**Afthim (1–1)**	None	582	6–9	
Mar 15 (DH Game 2)	at Campbell*		Jim Perry Stadium • Buies Creek, NC	**L** 5–8	Rossow (2–2)	**Cooke (0–4)**	Brown (1)	582	6–10	
Mar 18	at Duke*		Jack Coombs Field • Durham, NC	**L** 2–12	Zatkowski (2–1)	**Van Emon (0–1)**	None	574	6–11	
Mar 19	at No. 17 North Carolina*		Boshamer Stadium • Chapel Hill, NC	**W** 5–1	**Hamberger (1–0)**	Padgett (2–1)	**Afthim (2)**	3,375	7–11	
Mar 21	at UNC Greensboro*		UNCG Baseball Stadium • Greensboro, NC	**W** 3–1	**Pudvar (3–0)**	Murchison (3–2)	**Afthim (3)**	171	8–11	
Mar 22	at UNC Greensboro*		UNCG Baseball Stadium • Greensboro, NC	**W** 5–2	**Suchy (2–3)**	Miller (1–3)	**Afthim (4)**	295	9–11	
Mar 23	at UNC Greensboro*		UNCG Baseball Stadium • Greensboro, NC	**W** 6–4	**Finn (1–0)**	Thompson Jr. (1–1)	**Shaw III (1)**	324	10–11	
Mar 25	Boston College*		Elliot Ballpark • Storrs, CT	**L** 6–18	Kipp (2–1)	**Spirito IV (0–1)**	None	375	10–12	
Mar 26	at Northeastern*		Parsons Field • Brookline, MA	**L** 0–3	Gitlin (2–1)	**Hamberger (1–1)**	None	221	10–13	
Mar 28	at Xavier		J. Page Hayden Field • Cincinnati, OH	**L** 6–8	Piech (2–1)	**Pudvar (3–1)**	Hooker (1)		10–14	0–1
Mar 29 (DH Game 1)	at Xavier		J. Page Hayden Field • Cincinnati, OH	**W** 9–4	**Suchy (3–3)**	Hoskins (2–1)	**Cooke (1)**	371	11–14	1–1
Mar 29 (DH Game 2)	at Xavier		J. Page Hayden Field • Cincinnati, OH	**L** 7–10	Weber (3–2)	**Ellisen (1–3)**	Hooker (2)	357	11–15	1–2

April (16–3)
Date	Opponent	Rank	Site/Stadium	Score	Win	Loss	Save	Attendance	Overall Record	BE Record
Apr 1	Quinnipiac*		Elliot Ballpark • Storrs, CT	**W** 9–3	**Finn (2–0)**	Siebel (0–2)	None	385	12–15	
Apr 4	at Creighton		Charles Schwab Field • Omaha, NE	**W** 8–7	**Pudvar (4–1)**	Cancellieri (0–1)	**Afthim (5)**	1,089	13–15	2–2
Apr 5	at Creighton		Charles Schwab Field • Omaha, NE	**L** 2–14	Pineau (1–0)	**Suchy** (3–4)	None	1,445	13–16	2–3
Apr 6	at Creighton		Charles Schwab Field • Omaha, NE	**L** 7–11	Aukerman (6–0)	**Finn** (2–1)	Langrell (7)	1,167	13–17	2–4
Apr 8	Bryant*		Elliot Ballpark • Storrs, CT	Canceled						
Apr 9	Hofstra*		Elliot Ballpark • Storrs, CT	**W** 12–4	**West (1–0)**	Brown (1–4)	None	276	14–17	
Apr 11	Georgetown		Elliot Ballpark • Storrs, CT	**W** 4–2	**Finn (3–1)**	Leckszas (0–3)	**Afthim (6)**	312	15–17	3–4
Apr 12	Georgetown		Elliot Ballpark • Storrs, CT	**W** 10–3	**Ellison (2–3)**	Yoo (2–1)	**Cooke (2)**	493	16–17	4–4
Apr 13	Georgetown		Elliot Ballpark • Storrs, CT	**W** 8–3	**West (2–0)**	Williams (2–3)	**Cooke (3)**	698	17–17	5–4
Apr 15	at Boston College*		Eddie Pellagrini Diamond • Brighton, MA	**W** 21–9	**Shaw III (1–0)**	Meyer (0–1)	None	517	18–17	
Apr 17	Seton Hall		Elliot Ballpark • Storrs, CT	**W** 5–3	**Cooke (1–4)**	Torres (0–2)	**Afthim (7)**	678	19–17	6–4
Apr 18	Seton Hall		Elliot Ballpark • Storrs, CT	**W** 5–4	**Finn (4–1)**	Curry (2–3)	None	809	20–17	7–4
Apr 19	Seton Hall		Elliot Ballpark • Storrs, CT	**W** 8–6	**Finn (5–1)**	Hansen (1–3)	**Afthim (8)**	914	21–17	8–4
Apr 22	UMass*		Dunkin' Donuts Park • Hartford, CT	**W** 12–2^{7}	**Shaw III (2–0)**	Thomason (0–1)	None	1,035	22–17	
Apr 23	Army*		Elliot Ballpark • Storrs, CT	**W** 12–5	**Caruso (1–0)**	Ates (3–4)	None	589	23–17	
Apr 25	at St. John's		Jack Kaiser Stadium • Queens, NY	**W** 13–8	**Shaw III (3–0)**	Ruiz (0–1)	None	457	24–17	9–4
Apr 26	at St. John's		Jack Kaiser Stadium • Queens, NY	**W** 17–6	**Ellisen (3–3)**	Chaffee (0–4)	None	417	25–17	10–4
Apr 27	at St. John's		Jack Kaiser Stadium • Queens, NY	**W** 14–3^{8}	**West (3–0)**	Victor (2–2)	None	497	26–17	11–4
Apr 29	Rutgers*		Elliot Ballpark • Storrs, CT	**L** 11–13	Gleason (1–2)	**Hutchinson (0–1)**	Berglin (2)	683	26–18	
Apr 30	Rhode Island*		Elliot Ballpark • Storrs, CT	**W** 16–6^{7}	**Cooke (2–4)**	Jones (1–3)	None	858	27–18	

May (6–1)
Date	Opponent	Rank	Site/Stadium	Score	Win	Loss	Save	Attendance	Overall Record	BE Record
May 2	at Villanova		Villanova Ballpark at Plymouth • Plymouth Meeting, PA	**W** 19–7	**Finn (6–1)**	Sachais (4–5)	None	307	28–18	12–4
May 3	at Villanova		Villanova Ballpark at Plymouth • Plymouth Meeting, PA	**W** 29–10	**Ellisen (4–3)**	Francis (5–3)	**Alejandro (1)**	297	29–18	13–4
May 4	at Villanova		Villanova Ballpark at Plymouth • Plymouth Meeting, PA	**W** 7–5	**Afthim (2–1)**	Sachais (4–6)	None	266	30–18	14–4
May 10 (DH Game 1)	Butler		Elliot Ballpark • Storrs, CT	**W** 18–4	**Pudvar (5–1)**	Hendrickx (1–4)	**Peters (1)**	567	31–18	15–4
May 10 (DH Game 2)	Butler		Elliot Ballpark • Storrs, CT	**W** 11–6	**Ellisen (5–3)**	Goodpaster (3–5)	None	1,359	32–18	16–4
May 11	Butler		Elliot Ballpark • Storrs, CT	**W** 7–1	**West (4–0)**	Whiteside (1–2)	None	759	33–18	17–4
May 13	No. 25 Northeastern*		Elliot Ballpark • Storrs, CT	**L** 1–7	Gitlin (8–1)	**Abbadessa** (0–1)	Bowery (4)	811	33–19	
May 15	Maine*		Elliot Ballpark • Storrs, CT	**W** 13–4	**Pudvar (6–1)**	Larisa (0–1)	None	561	34–19	
May 16	Maine*		Elliot Ballpark • Storrs, CT	**W** 10–3	**Ellisen (6–3)**	Fitgerald (5–6)	None	869	35–19	
May 17	Maine*		Elliot Ballpark • Storrs, CT	**W** 5–1	**West (5–0)**	Friendman (1–2)	**Afthim (1)**	1,067	36–19	

Post-Season (2–2)

Big East Tournament (2–2)
Date	Opponent	Rank	Site/Stadium	Score	Win	Loss	Save	Attendance	Overall Record	BET Record
May 21	(3) Xavier	(2)	Prasco Park • Mason, OH	**L** 8–11^{10}	Hooker (4–7)	**Afthim (2–2)**	None	3,217	36–20	0–1
May 22	(4) St. John's	(2)	Prasco Park • Mason, OH	**W** 13–3	**Shaw III (4–0)**	Batuyios (2–1)	None		37–20	1–1
May 23	(3) Xavier	(2)	Prasco Park • Mason, OH	**W** 11–2	**West (6–0)**	Schmidt (2–5)	None	2,413	38–20	2–1
May 24	(1) Creighton	(2)	Prasco Park • Mason, OH	**L** 4–7	Strenke (1–0)	**Cooke (2–5)**	Langrell (1)	4,683	38–21	2–2

Rankings from D1Baseball. Parentheses indicate tournament seedings.
