= Robert Bishop =

Robert Bishop may refer to:

- Robert Hamilton Bishop (1777–1855), Scottish-American educator and Presbyterian minister
- Robert R. Bishop (1834–1910), Massachusetts lawyer and politician
- Bob Bishop, chief scout for Manchester United in Northern Ireland in the 1960s, who is credited with discovering George Best
- Rob Bishop (born 1951), U.S. Representative from Utah
- Bob Bishop (Heroes), fictional character on Heroes whose real name is Robert Bishop
- Rob Bishop (baseball), American baseball coach
- Robert Bishop (artist) (1945–1991), American fetish artist
