= Billy O'Conner =

Current position
- Title: Head coach
- Team: Xavier
- Conference: Big East
- Record: 242–228

Biographical details
- Born: January 2, 1987 (age 39); Cincinnati, Ohio, U.S.

Playing career
- 2006–2007: Indiana
- 2008–2009: Xavier
- 2009: Arizona League Rangers
- 2009: Spokane Indians
- 2010: Washington Wild Things
- Position: Catcher

Coaching career (HC unless noted)
- 2011–2012: Xavier (vol. asst.)
- 2013: Northern Kentucky (vol. asst.)
- 2014–2017: Xavier (asst.)
- 2018–present: Xavier

Head coaching record
- Overall: 242–228
- Tournaments: Big East: 12–13; NCAA: 2–2

Accomplishments and honors

Championships
- Big East Conference Tournament (2023); Big East regular season (2026)

William O'Conner Jr. (born January 2, 1987) is an American college baseball coach and former catcher. O'Conner is the head coach of the Xavier Musketeers baseball team. O'Conner played college baseball at the Indiana University for coach Tracy Smith before transferring to the Xavier University to play for coach Scott Googins from 2008 to 2009.

== Playing career ==
O'Conner attended Elder High School in Cincinnati, Ohio. O'Conner then enrolled at the Indiana University, to play college baseball for the Indiana Hoosiers baseball team.

As a freshman at the Indiana University in 2006, O'Conner had a .176 batting average, a .233 on-base percentage (OBP) and a .206 SLG.

As a sophomore in 2007, O'Conner batted .310 with a .310 SLG, 9 hits, and 9 RBIs.

In the 2008 season as a junior, O'Conner transferred to the Xavier University to play for the Xavier Musketeers baseball team and hit 5 doubles and 21 RBIs.

O'Conner had his best season as a senior in 2009, with home runs (2) and was a key contributor with RBIs (39), batting average (.333) and slugging (.412). He was named Honorable mention All-Atlantic 10 Conference baseball tournament Team.

== Coaching career ==
O'Conner joined the Xavier coaching staff as a volunteer coach in 2011. He stayed with the Musketeers through the 2012 season. O'Conner joined the Northern Kentucky Norse baseball staff as a volunteer coach in 2013. He re-joined the Xavier staff in 2013 as a full-time assistant. O'Conner spent 4 seasons as an assistant for the Xavier baseball staff.

=== Xavier ===
In June 2017, O'Conner was named the head coach of the Musketeers program. O'Conner lead the Musketeers to a 21–35 finish in his first season.

== Head coaching record ==
Record table
Season	Team	Overall	Conference	Standing	Postseason
Xavier Musketeers (Big East Conference) (2018–present)
2018	Xavier	20–35	7–11	6th	
2019	Xavier	27–31	12–4	2nd	Big East tournament
2020	Xavier	5–10	0–0		Season canceled due to COVID-19
2021	Xavier	28–26	15–11	4th	Big East tournament
2022	Xavier	33–27	13–8	3rd	Big East tournament
2023	Xavier	39–25	14–7	2nd	NCAA Regional
2024	Xavier	30–27	12–9	4th	Big East tournament
2025	Xavier	32–27	14–7	3rd	Big East tournament
2026	Xavier	28–30	15–6	T–1st	Big East tournament
Xavier:		242–238	102–63		
Total:		242–238			
National champion Postseason invitational champion Conference regular season champion Conference regular season and conference tournament champion Division regular season champion Division regular season and conference tournament champion Conference tournament champion

== See also ==
- List of current NCAA Division I baseball coaches
