= Evan Porter =

American baseball coach and former second baseman and shortstop

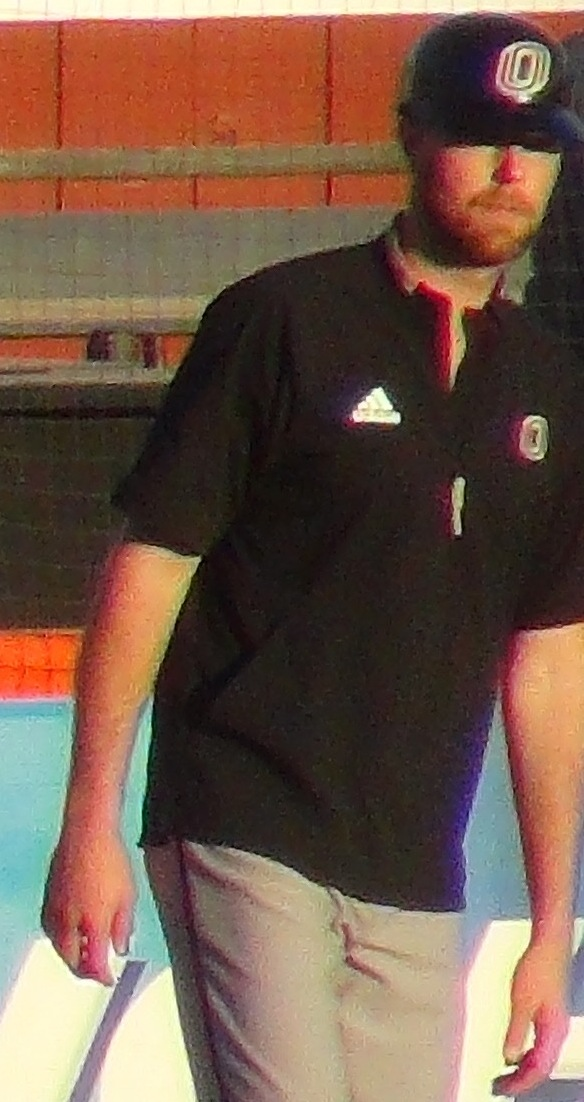
- Porter in 2022

Biographical details
- Born: March 13, 1987 (age 39); Omaha, Nebraska

Playing career
- 2005–2009: Omaha
- 2009: Williamsport Crosscutters
- 2010: Solingen Alligators
- 2011: Gothenburg Sharks
- 2011–2012: Victoria Park Reds
- 2012: SV ADO
- Position: Second baseman / Shortstop

Coaching career (HC unless noted)
- 2013–2016: Omaha (asst.)
- 2017–2026: Omaha

Head coaching record
- Overall: 196–274–2 (.417)
- Tournaments: 0–2 (NCAA)

Accomplishments and honors

Championships
- Summit League regular season (2019); Summit League tournament (2019)

Awards
- Summit League Coach of the Year (2019); Summit League Coach of the Year (2024)

Evan Thomas Porter (born March 13, 1987) is an American baseball coach and former second baseman and shortstop, who was the head baseball coach of the Omaha Mavericks. He played college baseball at Omaha for coach Bob Herold from 2005 to 2009 before playing professional baseball for 4 season from 2009 to 2012. He returned to Omaha in 2013 as an assistant.

== Amateur career ==
Porter attended Millard North High School in Omaha, Nebraska, where he was a teammate of Conor Gillaspie. Porter then enrolled at the University of Nebraska Omaha, to play college baseball for the Omaha Mavericks baseball team.

As a freshman at the University of Nebraska Omaha in 2006, Porter had a .338 batting average, a .381 on-base percentage (OBP) and a .510 SLG.

As a sophomore in 2007, Porter batted .336 with a .574 SLG, 12 home run, and 61 RBIs.

In the 2008 season as a junior, Porter hit 15 home runs, 18 doubles, and 76 RBIs.

Porter had his best season as a senior in 2009, leading the team in doubles (23), home runs (10), RBIs (62), batting average (.424) and slugging (.655).

== Professional career ==
Porter was drafted in the 23rd round of the 2009 Major League Baseball draft by the Philadelphia Phillies.

Porter signed with the Solingen Alligators on April 14, 2010. Porter spent the 2011 and 2012 seasons with the Gothenburg Sharks and the Victoria Park Reds.

Porter signed with SV ADO for the 2012 season.

== Coaching career ==
Porter returned to the United States in 2013 as an assistant coach at Omaha. He remained an assistant through the 2016 season. When the university parted ways with Bob Herold as head coach, Porter was named the interim head coach. After winning just 27 games in his first two seasons as head coach, Porter's 2019 team was projected to finish 5th in the Summit League, but the Mavericks won both the Summit League regular season and Tournament on route to their first ever NCAA Division I baseball tournament appearance.

In April 2026, Porter announced that he will be stepping down as Omaha head coach at the end of the season, citing family reasons.

== Head coaching record ==
Record table
Season	Team	Overall	Conference	Standing	Postseason
Omaha Mavericks (Summit League) (2017–2026)
2017	Omaha	12–40	9–19	5th	
2018	Omaha	15–35	10–17	5th	
2019	Omaha	31–24–1	20–10	1st	NCAA Regional
2020	Omaha	10–4	0–0		Season canceled due to COVID-19
2021	Omaha	22–25	14–12	3rd	
2022	Omaha	26–30	12–12	4th	
2023	Omaha	21–28	9–14	4th	
2024	Omaha	18–32–1	16–13–1	2nd	
2025	Omaha	20–30	12–16	4th	Summit League tournament
2026	Omaha	21–26	16–11	2nd	Summit League tournament
Omaha:		196–274–2 (.417)	118–124–1 (.488)		
Total:		196–274–2 (.417)			
National champion Postseason invitational champion Conference regular season champion Conference regular season and conference tournament champion Division regular season champion Division regular season and conference tournament champion Conference tournament champion
