= Miles Community College =

Community college in Miles City, Montana, U.S.

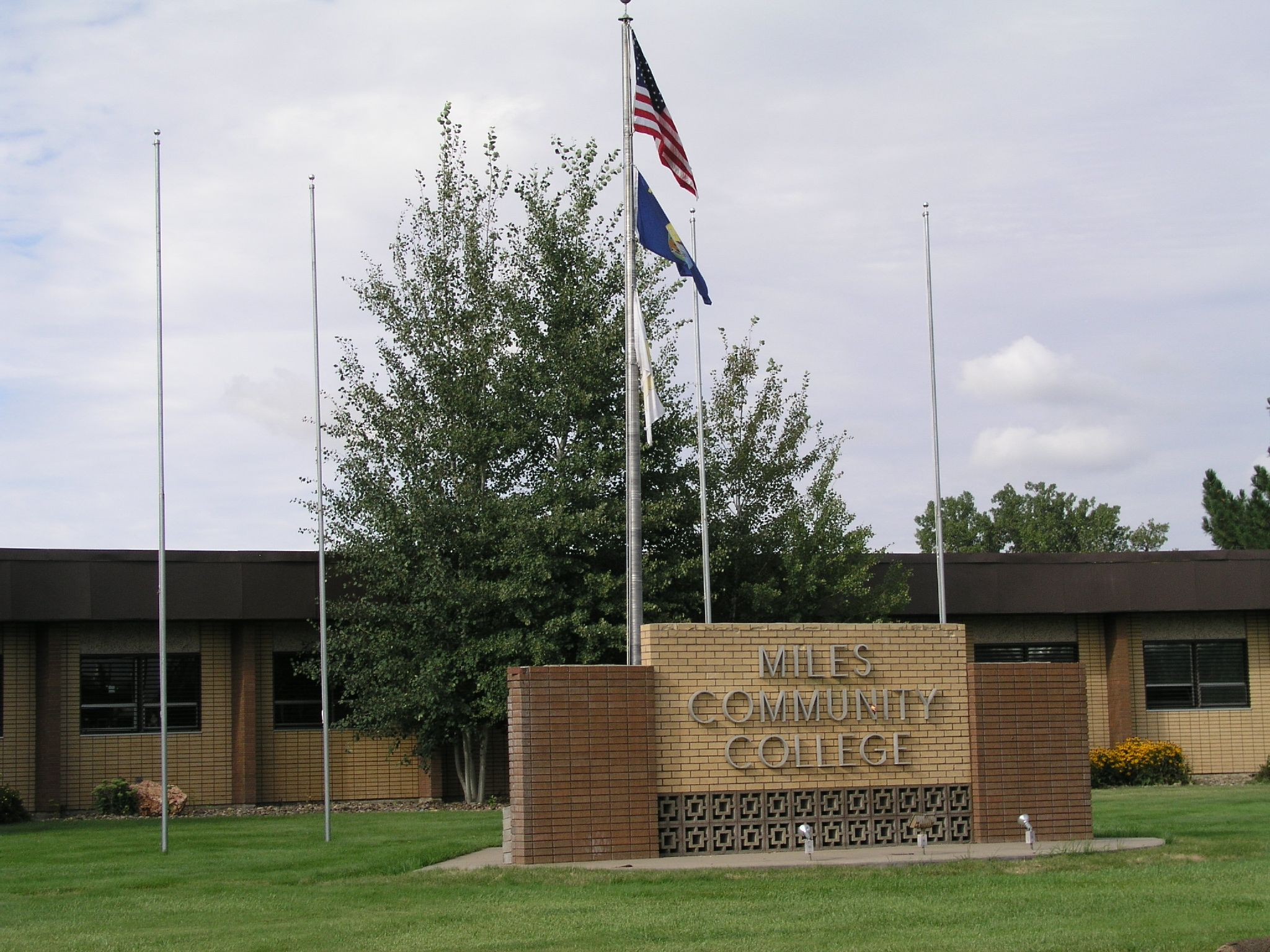
- Motto: Start Here – Go Anywhere!
- Type: Public community college
- Established: 1939; 87 years ago
- Accreditation: NCCU
- Academic affiliations: Space-grant
- President: Ron Slinger
- Students: 383
- Location: Miles City, Montana, United States; 46°24′20″N 105°49′35″W
- Campus: 46 acres (19 ha)
- Nickname: Pioneers
- Website: milescc.edu
- Location within Montana

Miles Community College is a public community college in Miles City, Montana. It is a two-year college offering a variety of credentials: Certificate, Certificate of Applied Science, and Associate of Applied Science. They also have courses for credit in Commercial Driver's License and Certified Nursing Assistant.

== History ==
The college was founded in 1939 as Custer County Junior College. For almost 20 years it operated out of a few rooms in the local public high school. In 1957, MCC moved into the former Milwaukee Railroad Depot building.

In 1966 the name was changed to Miles Community College. Then in 1967, they moved into a new building which is on the current campus location. It was constructed after passage of a bond issued by county voters. On April 4, 1970, the first independent board of trustees was elected. In 1971, Miles Community College was granted accreditation by the Northwest Commission on Colleges and Universities.

During academic year 1971-72, a new student center was constructed. A grant of $1.5 million from the Montana Coal Board in 1977 enabled the college to construct a new vocational building and a library learning resource center classroom addition. Construction of a physical education complex was completed in November 1980. In August 1997, four new dormitory buildings were added to the student housing complex. Six years later, in October 2003, the college completed a new $2.3 million dormitory.

The distance-learning program began in 1992 utilizing interactive television. In 2002 distance learning also included on-line classes and sending mobile classrooms into rural high schools.

Robin Gerber, the History and Social Sciences Instructor, was awarded the 2006 Professor of the Year for the state of Montana.

== Athletics ==
Miles Community College is known as the Pioneers and the school colors are blue and white. In the 2025-2026 school year, they competed in Men's baseball, basketball, and rodeo and Women's basketball, rodeo, volleyball, and softball.

MCC competes in Region 13 of the National Junior College Athletic Association in the Mon-Dak Conference. They are in Division I for basketball and Division II for baseball, softball, and volleyball. For rodeo they are part of the National Intercollegiate Rodeo Association in the Big Sky Region.

Baseball Coach Rob Bishop earned NJCAA Region IX Coach of the Year four years in a row from 2007 to 2010. During his ten seasons the baseball team won 10 conference championships, five consecutive regional championships (2006-2010) and qualified for the NJCAA College World Series in 2007. He also was named Mon-Dak Athletic Conference Coach of the Year all ten years at MCC.

In 2008 the women’s basketball team, led by Coach Dwight Gunnare, won the Mon-Dak Conference and ranked 12th in the nation.

The men's basketball team won Region IX North Championship in the 2011-12 season.

Patrycja Jaworska was named to the 2019 WBCA Two-Year College Coaches' All-American Team. She led the basketball team to their first undefeated regular season.

Athletic director Jerry Olson announced he will retire after the 2025–26 Pioneer athletic season. Chase Tait, head coach for men's basketball and assistant athletic director, will become the new athletic director on June 1, 2026.

== Leadership ==
- 1939 - George Gloege, Dean of Students
- 1949 to 1970 - Kenneth Smith, Dean
- 1970 to 1979 - Vern Kailey, President
- 1979 Jud Flower, President
- 1995 Frank Williams, President
- 2001 to 2006 - Darrell Hammon, President
- 2006 - Stefani Gray Hicswa, President
- 2014 - Stacy Klippenstein, President
- 2020 - Ron Slinger, President
