= 2024 Summit League baseball tournament =

College baseball tournament

- Teams: 4
- Format: Double-elimination
- Finals site: J. L. Johnson Stadium; Tulsa, Oklahoma
- Champions: Oral Roberts (22nd title)
- Winning coach: Ryan Folmar (7th title)
- MVP: Drew Stahl (Oral Roberts)
- Television: MidcoSN/Summit League Network

2024 Summit League baseball standings
	Conf.						Overall
Team	W		L		T	PCT	W		L		T	PCT
St. Thomas* ‍†‍‍	16	–	10	–	0	.615	22	–	23	–	0	.489
Omaha ‍‍‍	16	–	13	–	1	.550	18	–	32	–	1	.363
North Dakota State ‍‍‍	14	–	12	–	1	.537	20	–	30	–	1	.402
Oral Roberts ‍‍‡‍^{y}	13	–	15	–	1	.466	27	–	30	–	1	.474
Northern Colorado ‍‍‍	13	–	16	–	1	.450	14	–	36	–	1	.284
South Dakota State ‍‍‍	11	–	17	–	0	.393	20	–	29	–	0	.408
* Ineligible for the 2024 NCAA tournament due to transition from Division III
† – Conference champion ‡ – Tournament champion y – Invited to the NCAA Tournament; As of May 25, 2024; Rankings from D1Baseball

The 2024 Summit League baseball tournament took place from May 25 through 28, 2024. The top four out of six teams in the conference's regular season met in the double-elimination tournament held at J. L. Johnson Stadium on the campus of Oral Roberts University in Tulsa, Oklahoma. The defending champion was Oral Roberts, and they successfully defended their title with their 22nd tournament championship. The Golden Eagles earned the Summit League's automatic bid to the 2024 NCAA Division I baseball tournament.

== Standings and seeding ==
The top four teams form the regular season will be seeded one through four based on conference winning percentage during the double round-robin regular season. The teams then play a double-elimination tournament.

Place	Seed	Team	Conference				Overall			
Place	Seed	Team	W	L	T	%	W	L	T	%
1		St. Thomas	16	10	0	.615	22	24	0	.478
2	1	Omaha	16	13	1	.550	18	30	1	.378
3	2	North Dakota State	14	12	1	.537	19	28	1	.406
4	3	Oral Roberts	13	15	1	.466	24	30	1	.445
5	4	Northern Colorado	13	16	1	.450	14	36	1	.284
6		South Dakota State	11	17	0	.393	20	29	0	.408

- St. Thomas is ineligible for postseason tournaments until 2026
- St. Thomas and South Dakota State did not participate in the tournament

== Results ==
First round May 22/23; MidcoSN/SLN
1	Omaha	2
4	Northern Colorado	4
2	North Dakota State	3
3	Oral Roberts	11
Lower round 1
1	Omaha	5
2	North Dakota State	7

Semi-finals; May 23/24; MidcoSN/SLN
4	Northern Colorado	0
3	Oral Roberts	14
Lower final
2	North Dakota State	9
4	Northern Colorado ^{(10)}	10

Finals; May 25; MidcoSN/SLN
3	Oral Roberts	11
4	Northern Colorado	4

== All-Tournament Team ==
The following players were named to the all-tournament team:

Player	School
Drew Stahl (MVP)	Oral Roberts
Elijah Rodriguez	Oral Roberts
David Herring	Oral Roberts
Jakob Hall	Oral Roberts
Brooks Fowler	Oral Roberts
Caleb Isaacs	Oral Roberts
Murphy Gienger	Northern Colorado
Carter Monda	Northern Colorado
Jake Storey	Northern Colorado
Caden Wagner	Northern Colorado
Kai Wagner	Northern Colorado
Sam Canton	North Dakota State
Joey Danielson	North Dakota State
Harrison Krieling	Omaha
