= Tyler Oakes =

American college baseball coach

Current position
- Title: Head coach
- Team: North Dakota State
- Conference: Summit League
- Record: 95–113–1

Biographical details
- Born: November 8, 1986 (age 39)

Playing career
- 2006–2009: Minnesota
- 2009: Princeton Rays
- Position: Pitcher

Coaching career (HC unless noted)
- 2010–2011: South Dakota State (GA/P)
- 2012–2013: Minnesota (volunteer assistant)
- 2014–2016: North Dakota State (P)
- 2017–2018: North Dakota State (P/RC)
- 2019–2021: North Dakota State (associate HC)
- 2022–present: North Dakota State

Head coaching record
- Overall: 108–145–1

Accomplishments and honors

Championships
- Summit League regular season (2022); Summit League tournament (2025)

Records
- Summit League Coach of the Year (2022)

Tyler Oakes (born November 8, 1986) is an American college baseball coach, head coach of the NCAA Division I Summit League's North Dakota State Bison. He was the pitching coach, recruiting coordinator and associate head coach at North Dakota State from 2014 to 2021. Prior to North Dakota State, Oakes was an assistant for South Dakota State and Minnesota.

== Playing career ==
Tyler Oakes played four years of college baseball at Minnesota from 2006 to 2009 before being signed as an undrafted free agent by the Tampa Bay Rays. Oakes played one season in the Appalachian League for the Princeton Rays in 2009 before retiring from professional baseball.

== Coaching career ==
On June 22, 2021, North Dakota State announced that Oakes would become the 22nd head coach in the team's history after Tod Brown departed to take the head coaching job at New Mexico.

On May 20, 2022, North Dakota State clinched their first Summit League regular season title under Oakes' leadership. For that leadership he received the 2022 Summit League Coach of the Year award. In Oakes' first Summit League Tournament as head coach; the Bison went 1-2, losing to Omaha twice and beating South Dakota State in their lone win.

On May 24, 2025, Oakes led the Bison to their first Summit League tournament title under his leadership, and the program's first since 2021. They defeated Oral Roberts en route to the program's third NCAA tournament berth. In Oakes' first NCAA tournament as head coach, his Bison were defeated by Arkansas before defeating Kansas - which was the program's second-ever Division I NCAA tournament win. They would be eliminated in the next game by Creighton.

== Head coaching record ==
Record table
Season	Team	Overall	Conference	Standing	Postseason
North Dakota State Bison (Summit League) (2022–present)
2022	North Dakota State	31–19	17–5	1st	
2023	North Dakota State	23–30	16–7	2nd	
2024	North Dakota State	20–30–1	14–12–1	3rd	
2025	North Dakota State	21–34	13–15	3rd	NCAA Regional
2026	North Dakota State	13–32	9–16	5th	
North Dakota State:		108–145–1 (.427)	69–55–1 (.556)		
Total:		108–145–1 (.427)			
National champion Postseason invitational champion Conference regular season champion Conference regular season and conference tournament champion Division regular season champion Division regular season and conference tournament champion Conference tournament champion
