= 2021 Summit League baseball tournament =

- Teams: 4
- Format: Double-elimination
- Finals site: Tal Anderson Field; Omaha, Nebraska
- Champions: North Dakota State (2nd title)
- Winning coach: Tod Brown (2nd title)
- MVP: Jake Malec (North Dakota State)

2021 Summit League baseball standings
	Conf.				Overall
Team	W		L	PCT	W		L	PCT
Oral Roberts ‍†‍‍	19	–	7	.731	31	–	23	.574
North Dakota State ‍‍‡‍^{y}	20	–	11	.645	42	–	19	.689
Omaha ‍‍‍	14	–	12	.538	22	–	25	.468
South Dakota State ‍‍‍	9	–	19	.321	15	–	32	.319
Western Illinois ‍‍‍	7	–	20	.259	11	–	29	.275
† – Conference champion ‡ – Tournament champion y – Invited to the NCAA tournament As of June 6, 2021; Rankings from D1Baseball

The 2021 Summit League baseball tournament took place from May 27 through 29. The top four regular-season finishers of the league's six teams met in the double-elimination tournament held at Tal Anderson Field on the campus of the University of Nebraska Omaha in Omaha, Nebraska. The winner of the tournament, North Dakota State, earned the Summit League's automatic bid to the 2021 NCAA Division I baseball tournament.

== Seeding ==
The top four finishers from the regular season were seeded one through four based on conference winning percentage during the double round-robin regular season. The teams then played a double-elimination tournament.

== Results ==
First round May 27; MidcoSN
1	Oral Roberts	7
4	South Dakota State	1
2	North Dakota State	3
3	Omaha	1
Lower round 1
4	South Dakota State	7
3	Omaha	0

Semi-finals; May 28; MidcoSN
1	Oral Roberts	0
2	North Dakota State	5
Lower final
1	Oral Roberts ^{(11)}	5
4	South Dakota State	3

Finals; May 29; MidcoSN
1	Oral Roberts	15	6
2	North Dakota State	5	11

== All-Tournament Team ==
The following players were named to the all-tournament team:

Player	School
Jake Malec (MVP)	North Dakota State
Nick Emanuel	North Dakota State
Max Loven	North Dakota State
Cade Feeney	North Dakota State
Parker Harm	North Dakota State
Bennett Hostetler	North Dakota State
Anthony Martinez	Oral Roberts
Ryan Cash	Oral Roberts
Blake Hall	Oral Roberts
Matt Gaskins	Oral Roberts
Adam Scoggins	Oral Roberts
Reece Anderson	South Dakota State
Drew Beazley	South Dakota State
Richie Holetz	Omaha
