= 2025 Big East Conference baseball tournament =

American college baseball tournament

- Teams: 4
- Format: Double-elimination
- Finals site: Prasco Park; Mason, Ohio
- Champions: Creighton (2nd title)
- Winning coach: Ed Servais (2nd title)
- MVP: Connor Capece (Creighton)
- Television: FloSports, FS2, FS1

2025 Big East Conference baseball standings
	Conf.				Overall
Team	W		L	PCT	W		L	PCT
Creighton ‍†‍‡‍^{y}	17	–	4	.810	43	–	16	.729
UConn ‍†‍‍	17	–	4	.810	38	–	21	.644
Xavier ‍‍‍	14	–	7	.667	32	–	27	.542
St. John's ‍‍‍	13	–	8	.619	29	–	24	.547
Seton Hall ‍‍‍	10	–	11	.476	24	–	30	.444
Villanova ‍‍‍	6	–	15	.286	22	–	28	.440
Butler ‍‍‍	4	–	17	.190	15	–	39	.278
Georgetown ‍‍‍	3	–	18	.143	16	–	40	.286
† – Conference champion ‡ – Tournament champion y – Invited to the NCAA tournament As of June 1, 2025; Rankings from D1Baseball

The 2025 Big East Conference baseball tournament was held from May 21 through 24 at Prasco Park in Mason, Ohio. The event, held at the end of the conference regular season, determined the champion of the Big East Conference for the 2025 season. Top seeded Creighton won their second championship and earned an automatic bid to the 2025 NCAA Division I baseball tournament.

== Seeding and format ==
The top four finishers of the league's eight teams qualify for the double-elimination tournament. Teams are seeded based on conference winning percentage, with the first tiebreaker being head-to-head record. Creighton claimed the top seed over UConn due to their winning the head-to-head series.

Team	W	L	Pct.	GB	Seed
Creighton	17	4	.810	—	1
UConn	17	4	.810	—	2
Xavier	14	7	.667	3	3
St. John's	13	8	.619	4	4
Seton Hall	10	11	.476	7	—
Villanova	6	15	.286	11	—
Butler	4	17	.190	13	—
Georgetown	3	18	.143	14	—

== Bracket ==
First round
1	Creighton	10
4	St. John's	8
Winner's bracket
2	UConn	8
3	Xavier	11 ^{(10)}
4	St. John's	3
2	UConn	13
Loser's bracket

Semi-finals
1	Creighton	11
3	Xavier	8
3	Xavier	2
2	UConn	11

Finals
1	Creighton	7	−
2	UConn	4	−

== Schedule ==
Game	Time*	Matchup^{#}	Score	Notes	Reference
Wednesday, May 21
1	2:30 pm	No. 4 St. John's vs No. 1 Creighton	8−10		
2	6:30 pm	No. 3 Xavier vs No. 2 UConn	11−8 ^{(10)}		
Thursday, May 22
3	2:30 pm	No. 4 St. John's vs No. 2 UConn	3−13	St. John's Eliminated	
4	6:30 pm	No. 1 Creighton vs No. 3 Xavier	11−8		
Friday, May 23
5	5:00 pm	No. 2 UConn vs No. 3 Xavier	11–2	Xavier Eliminated	
Saturday, May 24
6	5:00 pm	No. 1 Creighton vs No. 2 UConn	7–4	Creighton wins Big East Tournament	

== All-Tournament Team ==
The following players were named to the All-Tournament team.

Po.	Name	School	CLass
P	Garrett Langrell	Creighton	Gr.
P	Luke Hoskins	Xavier	Sr.
C	Connor Capece	Creighton	So.
1B	Connor Misch	Xavier	Jr.
IF	Ryan Daniels	UConn	Jr.
IF	Tyler Minick	UConn	So.
IF	Matt Scherrman	Creighton	Gr.
OF	Jon LeGrande	St. John's	Jr.
OF	Caleb Shpur	UConn	Sr.
OF	Nolan Sailors	Creighton	Sr.
OF	Tate Gillen	Creighton	Jr.

=== Jack Kaiser Award ===
Connor Capece won the Jack Kaiser Award as the tournament Most Outstanding Player. Capece was a sophomore catcher for Creighton who batted 7 for 12 with 5 RBI and 2 runs scored during the tournament.
