= 2025 Summit League baseball tournament =

College baseball tournament

- Teams: 4
- Format: Double-elimination
- Finals site: Tal Anderson Field; Omaha, Nebraska
- Champions: North Dakota State (3rd title)
- Runner-up: Oral Roberts
- Winning coach: Tyler Oakes (1st title)
- MVP: Nolan Johnson (North Dakota State)
- Television: MidcoSN/Summit League Network

2025 Summit League baseball standings
	Conf.				Overall
Team	W		L	PCT	W		L	PCT
Oral Roberts ‍†‍‍	21	–	9	.700	37	–	22	.627
St. Thomas* ‍†‍‍	21	–	9	.700	29	–	21	.580
North Dakota State ‍‍‡‍^{y}	13	–	15	.464	21	–	34	.382
Omaha ‍‍‍	12	–	16	.429	20	–	30	.400
South Dakota State ‍‍‍	12	–	18	.400	16	–	36	.308
Northern Colorado ‍‍‍	9	–	21	.300	18	–	33	.353
† – Conference champion ‡ – Tournament champion y – Invited to the NCAA Tournament * Ineligible for the 2025 NCAA tournament due to transition from Division III; As of June 1, 2025; Rankings from D1Baseball

The 2025 Summit League baseball tournament took place from May 21 through 24, 2025. The top four out of the eligible five teams (St. Thomas is ineligible) in the conference's regular season met in the double-elimination tournament held at Tal Anderson Field on the campus of the University of Nebraska–Omaha in Omaha, Nebraska. North Dakota State won the tournament and earned the Summit League's automatic bid to the 2025 NCAA Division I baseball tournament. The defending champion was Oral Roberts, who fell short of repeating their title in the tournament finals.

== Standings and seeding ==
The top four teams from the regular season were seeded one through four based on conference winning percentage during the double round-robin regular season. The teams then played a double-elimination tournament.

Place	Seed	Team	Conference			Overall		
Place	Seed	Team	W	L	%	W	L	%
1	1	Oral Roberts	21	9	.700	34	20	.630
2		St. Thomas	21	9	.700	29	21	.580
3	2	North Dakota State	13	15	.464	17	31	.354
4	3	Omaha	12	16	.429	19	28	.404
5	4	South Dakota State	12	18	.400	16	34	.320
6		Northern Colorado	9	21	.300	18	33	.353

- St. Thomas is ineligible for postseason tournaments until 2026
- St. Thomas and Northern Colorado did not participate in the tournament

== Results ==
First round May 21/22; MidcoSN/SLN
1	Oral Roberts	11
4	South Dakota State	2
2	North Dakota State	1
3	Omaha	0
Lower round 1
3	Omaha	7
4	South Dakota State	6

Semi-finals; May 22/23; MidcoSN/SLN
1	Oral Roberts	0
2	North Dakota State	4
Lower final
1	Oral Roberts	8
3	Omaha	1

Finals; May 24; MidcoSN/SLN
2	North Dakota State	1	4
1	Oral Roberts	3	2

== All-Tournament Team ==
The following players were named to the All-Tournament Team:

Player	School
Nolan Johnson (MVP)	North Dakota State
Sam Canton	North Dakota State
Davis Hamilton	North Dakota State
Logan Knight	North Dakota State
Danny Lachenmayer	North Dakota State
Jake Schaffner	North Dakota State
Brenden Asher	Oral Roberts
Cooper Combs	Oral Roberts
Wailele Kane-Yates	Oral Roberts
Dalton Patten	Oral Roberts
Jack Schark	Oral Roberts
Drew Borner	Omaha
Ben Weber	Omaha
Carter Sintek	South Dakota State
