= 2019 Summit League baseball tournament =

- Teams: 4
- Format: Double-elimination
- Finals site: J. L. Johnson Stadium; Tulsa, Oklahoma
- Champions: Omaha (1st title)
- Winning coach: Evan Porter (1st title)
- MVP: Payton Kinney (Omaha)

2019 Summit League baseball standings
	Conf.						Overall
Team	W		L		T	PCT	W		L		T	PCT
Omaha ‍†‍‡‍^{y}	20	–	10	–	0	.667	31	–	24	–	1	.563
South Dakota State ‍‍‍	19	–	10	–	0	.655	28	–	22	–	0	.560
Oral Roberts ‍‍‍	17	–	12	–	0	.586	29	–	26	–	0	.527
Western Illinois ‍‍‍	16	–	14	–	0	.533	22	–	31	–	0	.415
North Dakota State ‍‍‍	15	–	15	–	0	.500	19	–	24	–	0	.442
Purdue Fort Wayne ‍‍‍	2	–	28	–	0	.067	7	–	45	–	0	.135
† – Conference champion ‡ – Tournament champion y – Invited to the NCAA tournament As of June 5, 2019; Rankings from D1Baseball

The 2019 Summit League baseball tournament took place from May 22 through 25. The top four regular season finishers of the league's six teams met in the double-elimination tournament held at J. L. Johnson Stadium on the campus of Oral Roberts in Tulsa, Oklahoma. The winner of the tournament, Omaha, earned the Summit League's automatic bid to the 2019 NCAA Division I baseball tournament.

== Seeding ==
The top four finishers from the regular season were seeded one through four based on conference winning percentage during the double round robin regular season. The teams then played a double elimination tournament.

== Results ==
First round
1	Omaha	15
4	Western Illinois	9
2	South Dakota State	2
3	Oral Roberts	5
Lower round 1
4	Western Illinois	5
2	South Dakota State	9

Semi-finals
1	Omaha	3
3	Oral Roberts	2
Lower final
2	South Dakota State	0
3	Oral Roberts	4

Finals
1	Omaha	0	4
3	Oral Roberts	6	0

== Conference championship ==
Summit League Championship
(1) Omaha Mavericks	vs.	(3) Oral Roberts Golden Eagles

May 25, 2019, 11:00 a.m. (CDT), at J. L. Johnson Stadium in Tulsa, Oklahoma
Team	1	2	3	4	5	6	7	8	9	R	H	E
(1) Omaha	0	0	0	0	0	0	0	0	0	0	4	1
(3) Oral Roberts	3	0	1	1	1	0	0	0	X	6	7	0
WP: Trey Wolf (1–3) LP: Andrew Brighton (2–4)

May 25, 2019, 2:00 p.m. (CDT), at J. L. Johnson Stadium in Tulsa, Oklahoma
Team	1	2	3	4	5	6	7	8	9	R	H	E
(3) Oral Roberts	0	0	0	0	0	0	0	0	0	0	2	2
(1) Omaha	0	2	0	0	0	2	0	0	X	4	8	0
WP: Payton Kinney (11–1) LP: AJ Archambo (4–3); Home runs: ORU: None; OMAHA: Braden Rogers×2; Attendance: 763
