= Tod Brown (baseball) =

American baseball coach

Current position
- Title: Head coach
- Team: New Mexico
- Conference: Mountain West
- Record: 105–107 (.495)

Biographical details
- Born: June 27, 1971 (age 55); Charleston, South Carolina, U.S.

Playing career
- 1991–1994: Arizona
- 1994: Brainerd Bears
- 1996: Minot Mallards
- Position: Pitcher

Coaching career (HC unless noted)
- 1997–1998: Sabino HS (assistant)
- 1999: Arizona (volunteer asst.)
- 2000–2007: Bowling Green (assistant)
- 2008–2021: North Dakota State
- 2022–present: New Mexico

Head coaching record
- Overall: 446–457 (.494)
- Tournaments: 1–4 (NCAA)

Accomplishments and honors

Championships
- 2× Summit tournament (2014, 2021)

Tod Markey Brown (born June 27, 1971) is an American baseball coach and former pitcher, currently serving as head baseball coach of the New Mexico Lobos. He played college baseball for Arizona for four seasons, helping the team to the 1992 Pac-10 Conference championship and falling just shy of the 1993 College World Series. He then served as the head coach of the North Dakota State Bison (2008–2021).

== Early life, education, and pro baseball career ==
Born in Charleston, South Carolina, Brown grew up in Tucson, Arizona and graduated from Sabino High School in 1989. At the University of Arizona, Brown was a left-handed pitcher for Arizona Wildcats baseball from 1991 to 1994. Setting a school record with 35 appearances, Brown had six wins and eight saves for Arizona in 1993. In 1993, he played collegiate summer baseball with the Harwich Mariners of the Cape Cod Baseball League. Brown graduated from Arizona in 1994 with a bachelor's degree in regional development.

Not selected in the 1994 Major League Baseball draft, Brown played two seasons of independent league baseball after college. With the Brainerd Bears of the North Central League in 1994, Brown had 17 appearances (12 starts), a 5–2 record, and 3.15 ERA on a Bears team that won the North Central League playoffs. After the season, Brown later signed with the Cleveland Indians but was released during 1995 spring training due to an injury.

Returning to baseball in 1996, Brown had four appearances with three starts, an 0–1 record, and 9.88 ERA for the Minot Mallards of the Prairie League. In 1997, Brown completed a post-baccalaureate degree in education at Chapman University.

== Coaching career ==
=== Early coaching career (1997–2007) ===
From 1997 to 1998, Brown was an assistant coach at Sabino High School, helping Sabino win the 1997 Arizona 4A state championship. Staying in Tucson, Brown returned to the University of Arizona on August 18, 1998 as volunteer assistant coach under head coach Jerry Stitt.

Then from 2000 to 2007, Brown was pitching coach and recruiting coordinator at Bowling Green. Bowling Green won back-to-back Mid-American Conference East Division titles in 2001 and 2002.

=== North Dakota State (2008–2021) ===
On July 3, 2007, North Dakota State University hired Brown as head coach of North Dakota State Bison baseball. Brown inherited a program that had three straight losing seasons; the North Dakota State athletic program was also in the final year of a four-year transition from Division II to Division I.

In his first five seasons, North Dakota State consistently improved its win total, reaching a program record 40 wins in 2012. On February 18, 2012, North Dakota State upset no. 5 Arizona 8–2 for the first win in program history over a ranked Division I opponent.

Then in 2014, despite a fifth and last place finish in conference standings, Brown led North Dakota State to two new historical firsts: the Summit League tournament title, which resulted in an automatic NCAA Division I tournament bid. The 2021 North Dakota State baseball team reached a new program high 42 wins with the second Summit tournament title and NCAA tournament.

Brown had a 341–350 record in 14 seasons at North Dakota State from 2008 to 2021.

=== New Mexico (2022–present) ===
On June 17, 2021, Brown was named the head baseball coach at the University of New Mexico.

== Head coaching record ==
Record table
Season	Team	Overall	Conference	Standing	Postseason
North Dakota State Bison (Summit League) (2008–2021)
2008	North Dakota State	15–30	7–16	8th	
2009	North Dakota State	16–28	10–14	5th	
2010	North Dakota State	22–30	11–16	T–6th	
2011	North Dakota State	22–32	15–12	3rd	
2012	North Dakota State	40–20	14–10	3rd	
2013	North Dakota State	26–27	11–13	4th	
2014	North Dakota State	25–26	10–12	5th	NCAA Regional
2015	North Dakota State	20–31	11–19	5th	
2016	North Dakota State	29–25	12–18	5th	
2017	North Dakota State	31–25	19–11	2nd	
2018	North Dakota State	26–24	15–13	3rd	
2019	North Dakota State	19–24	15–15	5th	
2020	North Dakota State	8–9	0–0		Season canceled due to COVID-19
2021	North Dakota State	42–19	20–11	2nd	NCAA Regional
North Dakota State:		341–350 (.493)	170–180 (.486)		
New Mexico Lobos (Mountain West Conference) (2022–present)
2022	New Mexico	21–33	10–20	T–6th	
2023	New Mexico	26–25	13–17	5th	
2024	New Mexico	28–26	17–13	2nd	
2025	New Mexico	30–23	17–13	3rd	
New Mexico:		105–107 (.495)	57–63 (.475)		
Total:		446–457 (.494)			
National champion Postseason invitational champion Conference regular season champion Conference regular season and conference tournament champion Division regular season champion Division regular season and conference tournament champion Conference tournament champion

== See also ==
- List of current NCAA Division I baseball coaches
