= Villanova Ballpark at Plymouth =

Baseball stadium in Pennsylvania, U.S.

- Ballpark
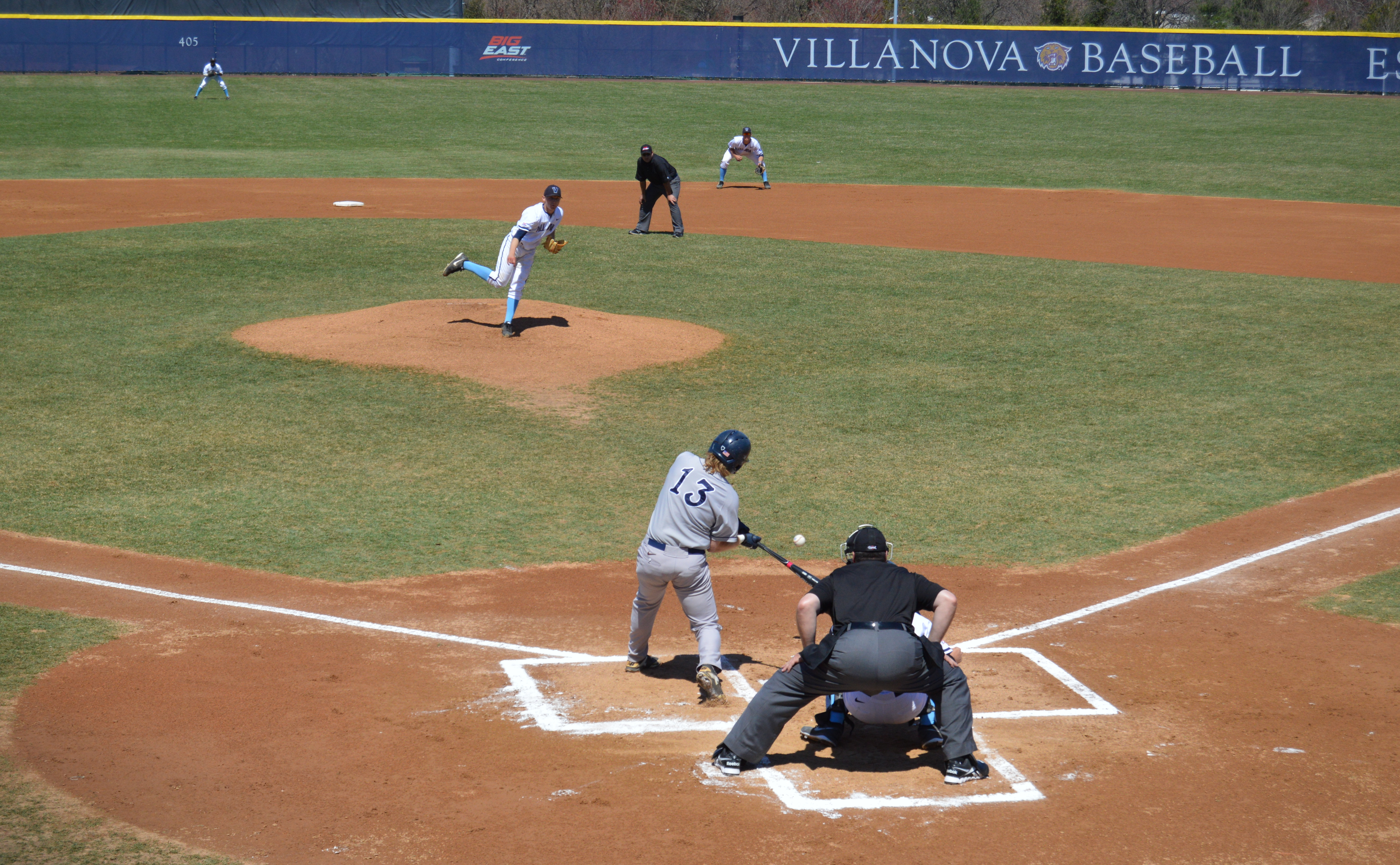
- A 2015 game between Villanova and Georgetown at Villanova Ballpark
- Interactive map of Villanova Ballpark at Plymouth
- Location: Plymouth Meeting, Pennsylvania
- Coordinates: 40.1232°N 75.2893°W
- Owner: Villanova University
- Operator: Villanova University
- Capacity: 750
- Surface: Natural grass with synthetic turf infield
- Field size: Left Field: 330 ft Left Center Field: 375 ft Center Field: 405 ft Right Center Field: 375 ft Right Field: 330 ft

Construction
- Opened: March 23, 2003
- Renovated: 2016

Tenant
- Villanova Wildcats (NCAA Division I Big East) (2003–present)

Villanova Ballpark at Plymouth is a baseball stadium in Plymouth Meeting, Pennsylvania. It is the home field of the college baseball team of Villanova University, the Wildcats. The stadium holds 750 spectators.

Prior to the venue's construction, Villanova played on campus at McGeehan Field until 1998 and at Richie Ashburn Field from 1999 to 2002.

== See also ==
- List of NCAA Division I baseball venues
