= Erv Huether Field =

Baseball park in Brookings, South Dakota, U.S.

- Interactive map of Erv Huether Field
- Location: 16th Avenue W, Brookings, SD, United States
- Coordinates: 44.322088°N 96.777765°W
- Owner: South Dakota State University
- Operator: South Dakota State University
- Capacity: 600
- Surface: Natural grass
- Scoreboard: Electronic

Construction
- Groundbreaking: 2006
- Built: 2006-8
- Opened: 2008

Tenant
- South Dakota State Jackrabbits baseball (Summit) (2008–present)

Erv Huether Field is a baseball venue in Brookings, South Dakota, United States. It is home to the South Dakota State Jackrabbits baseball team of the NCAA Division I Summit League. The field opened in 2008 and is named for former South Dakota State baseball coach Erv Huether. It has a capacity of approximately 600 spectators.

== History ==
Erv Huether Field was also the name (1974–2001) of the Jackrabbit baseball program's home from 1958 to 2001. The old Erv Huether Field was demolished in 2001. From 2001 to 2007, the program played at Bob Shelden Field, a municipal venue in Brookings.

In the spring of 2006, construction began on the present Erv Huether Field. Walls were completed in 2007, and batting cages and dugouts were added in the spring of 2008. On April 21, 2008, the new facility opened with a game against Presentation (SD), which South Dakota State won 22–3. In 2012, permanent seating was added, increasing the capacity for the stadium to 600. A new pressbox was added to the stadium also.

== Naming ==
Erv Huether, for whom the venue is named, coached the South Dakota State baseball program for 34 seasons, from 1950 to 1983. His overall record was 352-376-2, and he was awarded several accolades, including a 1984 induction into the American Baseball Coaches Association Hall of Fame.

== See also ==
- List of NCAA Division I baseball venues
