= Xavier Musketeers baseball =

- 2026 Xavier Musketeers baseball team
- Founded: 1926; 100 years ago
- Conference history: Midwestern City Conference (1981–1995); Atlantic 10 Conference (1996–2013)
- University: Xavier University
- Athletic director: Greg Christopher
- Head coach: Billy O'Conner (9th season)
- Conference: Big East Conference
- Location: Cincinnati, Ohio
- Home stadium: J. Page Hayden Field (capacity: 500)
- Nickname: Musketeers
- Colors: Navy blue, white, and gray

NCAA tournament appearances
- 2009, 2014, 2016, 2017, 2023

Conference tournament champions
- 2009, 2014, 2016, 2017, 2023

Conference regular season champions
- 2008, 2016, 2026

The Xavier Musketeers baseball team is the varsity intercollegiate baseball program of Xavier University in Cincinnati, Ohio, United States. The program's first season was in 1974, and it has been a member of the NCAA Division I Big East Conference since the start of the 2014 season. Its home venue is J. Page Hayden Field, located on Xavier's campus. Billy O'Conner is the team's head coach starting in the 2018 season. The program has appeared in 5 NCAA Tournaments, with the most recent appearance in 2023. It has won four conference tournament championships and 2 regular season conference titles. As of the start of the 2022 Major League Baseball season, 8 former Musketeers have appeared in Major League Baseball.

== History ==
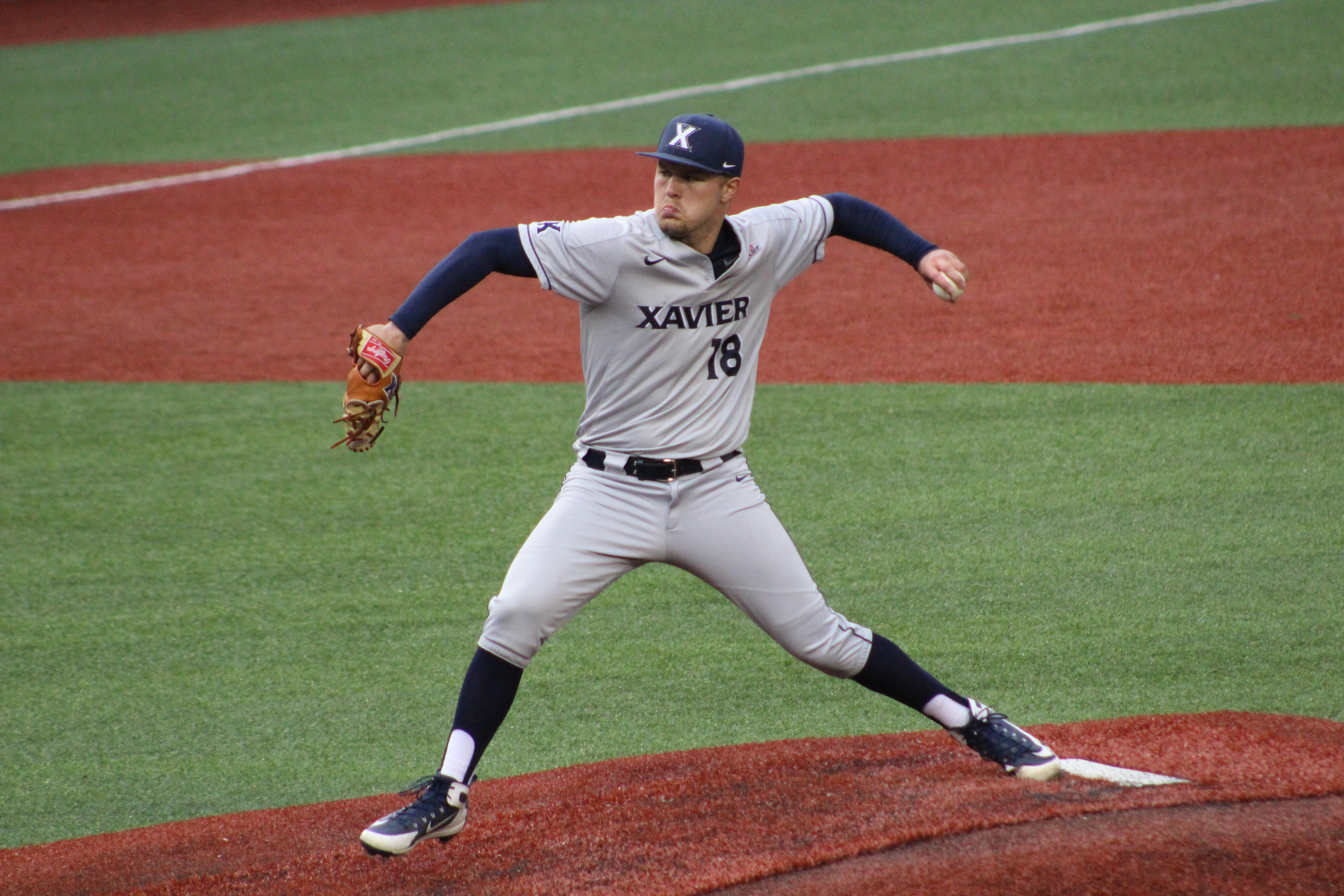
A Xavier pitcher in 2018

=== Early history ===
The program's first season of play was 1926.

=== Conference affiliations ===
- Midwestern City Conference (1981–1995)
- Atlantic 10 Conference (1996–2013)
- Big East Conference (2014–present)

== Xavier in the NCAA Tournament ==
Year	Record	Pct	Notes
2009	1–2	.333	Houston Regional
2014	1–2	.333	Nashville Regional
2016	2–2	.500	Nashville Regional
2017	2–2	.500	Louisville Regional
2023	2–2	.500	Nashville Regional
TOTALS	8–10	.444	

== J. Page Hayden Field ==
Xavier began playing at the location in the 1920s. In 1935, the field's dimensions were adjusted with the construction of the O'Connor Sports Center beyond the right center field fence. The field was renovated again in 1982 because of a donation made under the name of J. Page Hayden (1898–1979), the field's namesake. Following the 2010 season, a new playing surface, brick backstop, and dugouts were added.

From 1980 to 2013, Xavier baseball has a 450–307–3 overall record at the field.

== Head coaches ==
Xavier's longest tenured head coach is John Morrey, who had coached the team for 12 years from 1993-2004 before resigning following the 2004 season with an overall record of 287-371-2.

=== Current coaching staff ===
- Head coach – Billy O'Conner
- Pitching coach – Ethan Landon
- Assistant coach – Troy LaNeve
- Assistant coach – Riley Bertram

== Major League alumni ==
= All-Star	= Baseball Hall of Famer

Athlete	Years in MLB	MLB teams
Red Dooin	1902–1916	Philadelphia Phillies, Cincinnati Reds, New York Giants
Jim Boyle	1926	New York Giants
Buzz Boyle	1929–1930, 1933–1935	Boston Braves, Brooklyn Dodgers
Gordon McNaughton	1932	Boston Red Sox
Jim Brosnan	1954, 1956–1963	Chicago Cubs, St. Louis Cardinals, Cincinnati Reds, Chicago White Sox
Jim Bunning	1955–1971	Detroit Tigers, Philadelphia Phillies, Los Angeles Dodgers
Ron Moeller	1956, 1958, 1961, 1963	Baltimore Orioles, Los Angeles Angels, Washington Senators
Charles Leesman	2013–2014	Chicago White Sox
Vinny Nittoli	2021–present	Seattle Mariners, Philadelphia Phillies, New York Mets, Oakland Athletics
Zac Lowther	2021–2022	Baltimore Orioles

Taken from Baseball Reference. Updated June 28, 2021.

== See also ==
- List of NCAA Division I baseball programs
