= Omaha Mavericks baseball =

NCAA Division I college baseball team

- 2026 Omaha Mavericks baseball team
- Founded: 1947
- University: University of Nebraska Omaha
- Head coach: Rob Fournier (0th season)
- Conference: Summit League
- Location: Omaha, Nebraska
- Home stadium: Tal Anderson Field (capacity: 1,500)
- Nickname: Mavericks
- Colors: Crimson and black

NCAA tournament appearances
- Division II; 1975, 1976, 1977, 1981, 2002, 2005, 2006, 2007, 2008, 2009, 2010 Division I 2019

Conference tournament champions
- 2019

Conference regular season champions
- 2013, 2014, 2019

The Omaha Mavericks baseball team represents University of Nebraska Omaha, which is located in Omaha, Nebraska, United States. The Mavericks are an NCAA Division I college baseball program that competes in the Summit League. They began competing in Division I in 2012 and joined the Summit League in 2013.

The Omaha Mavericks play all home games on-campus at Tal Anderson Field. The Mavericks have played in one NCAA Division I Tournament. Over their 8 seasons in the Summit League, they have won three Summit League regular season titles and one Summit League Tournament.

Since the program's inception in 1947, two Mavericks have gone on to play in Major League Baseball, including two-time All-Star catcher Bruce Benedict.

== Conference membership history ==
- 1947-1976: Independent
- 1977-2008: North Central Conference
- 2009-2011: Mid-America Intercollegiate Athletics Association
- 2012: Independent
- 2013–present: Summit League

== Tal Anderson Field ==
Tal Anderson Field broke ground in 2019 and was ready in spring 2021. The field is named for former UNO baseball standout and long-time donor and supporter Tal Anderson who owned Baxter Auto Group. The field is the first on-campus home for the Omaha baseball team; prior to its construction, the team played at numerous high school and municipal facilities around Omaha. The field has fixed seating for 1,500 fans as well as berm seating on each baseline for additional fans. It features a state-of-the art artificial surface to extend the Mavericks' playing season. The facility includes a 34-foot by 25-foot scoreboard and video board in the outfield. The raised concourse also serves the adjoining Connie Claussen Field (the home of Omaha softball) with premium seating, a press box, concession areas, and restrooms. The Nebraska Philanthropic Trust led the fundraising for the Omaha baseball/softball Complex, which was able to be funded entirely with private donations. Construction of the facility was managed by the Tetrad Property Group, with Kiewit Corporation as the lead contractor.

== Head coaches ==
Records taken from the Omaha baseball record book.

Season	Coach	Years	Record	Pct.
1947-1951; 1953-1969; 1971-1976	Virgil Yelkin	28	439-196	.691
1952	Thurman Johnson	1	10-3	.769
1970	Carl Meyers	1	19-13	.594
1977-1999	Bob Gates	23	464-473	.495
2000–2016	Bob Herold	17	527-381-2	.580
2017–2026	Evan Porter	10	196–274–2	.417
Totals	6 coaches	80 seasons	1,509–1,349–2	.530

== Year-by-year NCAA Division I results ==
Records taken from the Omaha baseball record book.

Record table
Season	Coach	Overall	Conference	Standing	Postseason
Independent (2012)
2012	Bob Herold	12–36			
Summit League (2013–present)
2013	Bob Herold	27–22	20–6	1st	Ineligible (Division I transition)
2014	Bob Herold	31–20	15–9	1st	Ineligible (Division I transition)
2015	Bob Herold	21–31	12–18	4th	Ineligible (Division I transition)
2016	Bob Herold	28–28	18–12	2nd	Summit League tournament first round
2017	Evan Porter	12–40	9–19	5th	
2018	Evan Porter	15–35	10–17	5th	
2019	Evan Porter	31–24–1	20–10	1st	Summit League tournament champions Los Angeles Regional
2020	Evan Porter	10–4			Season cancelled on March 13 due to coronavirus pandemic
2021	Evan Porter	22-25	14-12	3rd	Summit League tournament first round
2022	Evan Porter	26-31	12-12	4th	Summit League tournament runner-up
2023	Evan Porter	21-28	9-14	4th	Summit League tournament first round
2024	Evan Porter	18-32-1	16-13-1	2nd	Summit League tournament first round
2025	Evan Porter	20-30	12-16	4th	Summit League tournament semifinals
Total:		294–376–2	167-158-1		
National champion Postseason invitational champion Conference regular season champion Conference regular season and conference tournament champion Division regular season champion Division regular season and conference tournament champion Conference tournament champion

== NCAA Division I tournament history ==
Omaha has participated in the NCAA Division I baseball tournament once.

Year	Region	Round	Opponent	Result
2019	Los Angeles Regional	First Round; Lower Round 1	UCLA; Baylor	L 2–5; L 6–24

== Awards and honors (Division I only) ==
- Over their 14 seasons in Division I, one Maverick has been named to an NCAA-recognized All-America team.
- Over their 13 seasons in the Summit League, 13 different Mavericks have been named to the all-conference first-team.

=== All-Americans ===
Year	Position	Name	Team	Selector
2019	SP	Payton Kinney	3rd	ABCA

=== Freshman First-Team All-Americans ===
Year	Position	Name	Selector
2013	2B	Clayton Taylor	CB

=== Summit League Coach of the Year ===
Year	Name
2013	Bob Herold
2014	Bob Herold
2019	Evan Porter

=== Summit League Player of the Year ===
Year	Position	Name
2013	OF	Ryan Keely
2016	3B	Clayton Taylor

=== Summit League Pitcher of the Year ===
Year	Handedness	Name
2014	Right	Tyler Fox
2016	Right	Tyler Fox
2019	Right	Payton Kinney

=== Summit League Newcomer of the Year ===
Year	Position	Name
2013	OF	Ryan Keely

Taken from the Omaha baseball record book. Updated March 21, 2020.

== Mavericks in the Major Leagues ==
= All-Star	= Baseball Hall of Famer

Athlete	Years in MLB	MLB teams
Bruce Benedict	1978–1989	Atlanta Braves
Tyler Cloyd	2012–2013, 2017–2018	Philadelphia Phillies, Seattle Mariners, Miami Marlins

Taken from Baseball Reference.

== See also ==
- List of NCAA Division I baseball programs
