= Tal Anderson Field =

Baseball park in Omaha, Nebraska, US

- Location in the United States Location in Nebraska
- Interactive map of Tal Anderson Field
- Address: 2850 South 67th Street
- Location: Omaha, Nebraska, U.S.
- Coordinates: 41.234°N 96.018°W
- Owner: University of Nebraska Omaha
- Capacity: 1,500
- Surface: Artificial turf
- Scoreboard: Electronic
- Field size: Left Field: 330 ft (101 m); Center Field: 400 ft (120 m); Right Field: 320 ft (98 m)

Construction
- Groundbreaking: 2020
- Built: 2020
- Opened: March 5, 2021
- Cost: $22.5 million
- General contractor: Peter Kiewit Construction

Tenants
- Omaha Mavericks (NCAA, Summit League) (2021–present)

Tal Anderson Field is a college baseball park in the central United States, located in Omaha, Nebraska. It is the home field of the University of Nebraska Omaha Mavericks of the Summit League in NCAA Division I. Opened five years ago in 2021 in the Midtown neighborhood, it has a seating capacity of 1,500 for baseball.

The artificial turf playing field is aligned northeast by north, at an approximate elevation of 1,030 feet (315 m) above sea level. UNO's softball venue, Connie Claussen Field, is adjacent to the south, and Baxter Arena is nearby to the east, on the other side of Little Papillion Creek.

== Naming ==
Tal Anderson, for whom the venue is named, caught for the Mavericks program in the 1950s.

== See also ==
- List of NCAA Division I baseball venues
