= 2023 North Dakota State Bison softball team =

American college softball season

2023 North Dakota State Bison softball
- Conference: Summit League
- Record: 30–21 (13–8 Summit)
- Head coach: Darren Mueller (22nd season)
- Assistant coaches: Gerice Olson; Kayti Grable
- Home stadium: Tharaldson Park

2023 Summit League softball standings
	Conf.				Overall
Team	W		L	PCT	W		L	PCT
South Dakota State ‍†‍‍	17	–	0	1.000	37	–	17	.685
Omaha ‍‍‡‍^{y}	15	–	5	.750	33	–	17	.660
North Dakota State ‍‍‍	13	–	8	.619	30	–	21	.588
South Dakota ‍‍‍	11	–	9	.550	24	–	28	.462
North Dakota ‍‍‍	9	–	10	.474	12	–	38	.240
St. Thomas* ‍‍‍	6	–	14	.300	18	–	35	.340
Kansas City ‍‍‍	4	–	17	.190	9	–	43	.173
Western Illinois ‍‍‍	3	–	15	.167	9	–	36	.200
† – Conference champion ‡ – Tournament champion y – Invited to the NCAA tournament * Ineligible for the 2023 NCAA tournament due to transition from Division III; As of May 20, 2023; Rankings from NFCA/USA Today

The 2023 North Dakota State Bison softball team was an American college softball team that represented North Dakota State University during the 2023 NCAA Division I softball season. The Bison were led by Darren Mueller in his twenty-second season, and played their home games at Tharaldson Park. They competed in the Summit League. The Bison finished the regular season in third place in the conference and claimed the three seed in the 2023 Summit League softball tournament. NDSU beat Kansas City on day 1, but lost to Omaha and South Dakota State on day 2 to be eliminated before the semifinals for the third year in a row.

== Previous season ==
The Bison finished the 2022 season with a 30-23 record, and a 10-8 record in Summit League play. NDSU played in the Summit League tournament as the 3rd seed. They defeated North Dakota and Omaha, before falling to South Dakota State and then Omaha in the elimination game to end their season in the semifinals.

== Personnel ==
=== Roster ===
2023 North Dakota State Roster
Pitchers: 9 – Paige Vargas – Senior; 18 – Lainey Lyle – Senior; 54 – Piper Reed – Freshman; 99 – Savy Williams – Sophomore; Catchers: 5 – Kaylee Moore – Senior; Outfielders: 1 – Emilee Buringa – Junior; 17 – Faith Daehlin – Sophomore; 22 – Ella Claus – Freshman	Infielders: 3 – Anjolee Aguilar-Beaucage – Junior; 8 – Skylar Padgett – Senior; 11 – Riley Leadstrom – Freshman; 12 – Bella Dean – Freshman; 31 – Carley Goetschius – Senior; 42 – Chloe Woldruff – Sophomore; Utility: 14 – Reanna Rudd (C/INF) – Junior; 35 – Zoe King (C/INF) – Freshman; 47 – Ava Chavarria (C/INF) – Freshman

=== Coaching staff ===
2023 North Dakota State Coaching Staff
Name	Position
Darren Mueller	Head coach
Gerice Olson	Associate head coach
Kayti Grable	Assistant Coach

== Schedule ==
2023 North Dakota State Bison softball game log
Regular Season (29–19)

February (6–8)
Date Time	Opponent	Rank	Site/stadium	Score	Win	Loss	Save	Attendance	Overall Record	Summit League Record
February 10; 10 AM	vs. California Baptist		Nancy Almaraz Field; Puerto Vallarta, Mexico	4–0	**Vargas (1–0)**	Mcconnell (0–1)	None	203	1–0	–
February 11; 12:30 PM	vs. BYU		Nancy Almaraz Field	1–10^{(5)}	Temples (1–0)	**Lyle (0–1)**	None	248	1–1	–
February 12; 8:30 AM	vs. No. 24 Oregon		Nancy Almaraz Field	3–4	Hansen (1–0)	**Vargas (1–1)**	None	378	1–2	–
February 12; 1:30 PM	vs. Maryland		Nancy Almaraz Field	2–4	Schlotterbeck (1–0)	**Lyle (0–2)**	Bucher (1)	275	1–3	–
February 13; 12 PM	vs. No. RV Ole Miss		Nancy Almaraz Field	0–8^{(5)}	Vestal (1–0)	**Reed (0–1)**	None	125	1–4	–
February 13; 2:30 PM	vs. No. RV Ole Miss		Nancy Almaraz Field	3–5	Furbush (1–0)	**Vargas (1–2)**	None	125	1–5	–
February 16; 3 PM	vs. Sacramento State		Nancy Almaraz Field	4–1	**Vargas (2–2)**	Bertuccio (0–1)	None	185	2–5	–
February 17; 10 AM	vs. Southern Illinois		Nancy Almaraz Field	5–3	**Lyle (1–2)**	Eberle (0–1)	**Vargas (1)**	185	3–5	–
February 17; 12:30 PM	vs. No. 11 Tennessee		Nancy Almaraz Field	0–8^{(6)}	Pickens (1–0)	**Lyle (1–3)**	None	122	3–6	–
February 18; 3 PM	vs. Cal State Fullerton		Nancy Almaraz Field	2–1	**Vargas (3–2)**	Sutherlin (0–1)	None	185	4–6	–
February 24; 10 AM	vs. Merrimack		Jane B. Moore Field; Auburn, AL	Cancelled - Weather Preventing Travel					4–6	–
February 25; 10 AM	vs. Brown		Jane B. Moore Field	6–0	**Vargas (4–2)**	Aguirre (0–1)	None		5–6	–
February 25; 3 PM	at No. 20 Auburn		Jane B. Moore Field	0–9^{(6)}	Penta (8–0)	**Lyle (1–4)**	None		5–7	–
February 26; 9 AM	vs. Brown		Jane B. Moore Field	2–0	**Lyle (2–4)**	Guevara (0–2)	None		6–7	–
February 26; 12 PM	at No. 20 Auburn		Jane B. Moore Field	0–4	Lowe (1–0)	**Vargas (4–3)**	Penta (1)	1,440	6–8	–

March (13–3)
Date Time	Opponent	Rank	Site/stadium	Score	Win	Loss	Save	Attendance	Overall Record	Summit League Record
March 3; 12:30 PM	vs. Drake		Tigers Softball Complex; Memphis, TN	Canceled, Rain					6–8	–
March 3; 5 PM	vs. UTSA		Tigers Softball Complex	2–3	Smith (1–5)	**Vargas (4–4)**	Estell (1)	217	6–9	–
March 4; 9 AM	vs. SIU-Edwardsville		Tigers Softball Complex	9–1	**Lyle (3–4)**	Ray (1–5)	**Vargas (2)**	147	7–9	–
March 4; 2 PM	at Memphis		Tigers Softball Complex	15–4	**Vargas (5–4)**	Hoschak (0–1)	None	273	8–9	–
March 5; 11:30 AM	vs. UTSA		Tigers Softball Complex	7–4	**Lyle (4–4)**	Estell (2–4)	**Reed (1)**	150	9–9	–
March 10; 2 PM	vs. Idaho State		U.S. Bank Stadium; Minneapolis, MN	9–3	**Lyle (5–4)**	Newman (2–2)	None		10–9	–
March 10; 7 PM	at Minnesota		U.S. Bank Stadium	0–2	Pease (6–3)	**Vargas (5–5)**	None	1,096	10–10	–
March 11; 11:30 AM	vs. Drake		U.S. Bank Stadium	7–2	**Williams (1–0)**	Bedsworth (0–3)	None		11–10	–
March 12; 11:30 AM	vs. Idaho State		U.S. Bank Stadium	4–1	**Vargas (6–5)**	McMurray (0–2)	None		12–10	–
March 12; 2 PM	vs. Drake		U.S. Bank Stadium	4–2	**Lyle (6–4)**	Hupke (3–3)	None		13–10	–
March 14; 4 PM	at No. RV Mississippi State		Nusz Park; Mississippi State, MS	2–0	**Vargas (7–5)**	Faapito (2–1)	None	146	14–10	–
March 15; 2 PM	vs. Purdue		Nusz Park	1–2	Echazarreta (5–6)	**Lyle (6–5)**	None	112	14–11	–
March 16; 4 PM	vs. Purdue		Nusz Park	4–0	**Vargas (8–5)**	Pinarski (1–1)	None	53	15–11	–
March 18; 10:30 AM	vs. Samford		Nusz Park	7–1	**Reed (1–1)**	Bond (3–4)	None	57	16–11	–
March 25; 12 PM	at Kansas City		Urban Youth Academy Softball Complex; Kansas City, MO	10–0^{(5)}	**Vargas (9–5)**	Stickel (0–1)	None		17–11	1–0
March 25; 2 PM	at Kansas City		Urban Youth Academy Softball Complex	4–1	**Lyle (7–5)**	Noble (2–7)	None	121	18–11	2–0
March 26; 11 AM	at Kansas City		Urban Youth Academy Softball Complex	11–1^{(5)}	**Vargas (10–5)**	Milan (0–4)	None	87	19–11	3–0

April (9–6)
Date Time	Opponent	Rank	Site/stadium	Score	Win	Loss	Save	Attendance	Overall Record	Summit League Record
April 1; 3 PM	at Western Illinois		Mary Ellen McKee Softball Stadium; Macomb, IL	5–6^{(8)}	Rodriguez (4–7)	**Reed (1–2)**	None	147	19–12	3–1
April 2; 10 AM	at Western Illinois		Mary Ellen McKee Softball Stadium	1–0	**Lyle (8–5)**	Rodriguez (4–9)	None	89	20–12	4–1
April 2; 12 PM	at Western Illinois		Mary Ellen McKee Softball Stadium	13–4^{(5)}	**Vargas (11–5)**	Price (3–8)	None	89	21–12	5–1
April 7; 4 PM	vs. South Dakota; Series Relocated – Weather		Bowden Field; Sioux Falls, SD	0–8	Edwards (10–6)	**Vargas (11–6)**	None	99	21–13	5–2
April 8; 2 PM	vs. South Dakota		Bowden Field	2–0	**Lyle (9–5)**	Wedeking (6–9)	None	108	22–13	6–2
April 8; 4 PM	vs. South Dakota		Bowden Field	5–4	**Vargas (12–6)**	Edwards (10–7)	None	108	23–13	7–2
April 16; 3 PM	at South Dakota State		Jackrabbit Softball Stadium; Brookings, SD	0–4	Kniesche (16–4)	**Vargas (12–7)**	None	150	23–14	7–3
April 17; 11 AM	at South Dakota State		Jackrabbit Softball Stadium	3–12^{(5)}	Lasey (10–6)	**Lyle (10–5)**	None	149	23–15	7–4
April 17; 1 PM	at South Dakota State		Jackrabbit Softball Stadium	0–1	Kniesche (17–4)	**Vargas (12–8)**	None	149	23–16	7–5
April 22; 12 PM	at St. Thomas		South Field; St. Paul, MN	5–0	**Vargas (13–8)**	Cook (3–6)	None	250	24–16	8–5
April 22; 2 PM	at St. Thomas		South Field	9–0^{(6)}	**Lyle (11–5)**	True (0–1)	None	250	25–16	9–5
April 23; 11 AM	at St. Thomas		South Field	6–2	**Lyle (12–5)**	Murphy (2–11)	None	75	26–16	10–5
April 29; 12 PM	North Dakota		Tharaldson Park; Fargo, ND	8–5	**Vargas (14–8)**	Carr (6–10)	None	222	27–16	11–5
April 29; 2 PM	North Dakota		Tharaldson Park	4–2	**Lyle (12–6)**	Albrecht (2–15)	None	222	28–16	12–5
April 30; 11 AM	North Dakota		Tharaldson Park	3–4	Albrecht (3–15)	**Vargas (14–9)**	Lasota (3)	153	28–17	12–6

May (1–2)
Date Time	Opponent	Rank	Site/stadium	Score	Win	Loss	Save	Attendance	Overall Record	Summit League Record
May 5; 12 PM	Omaha		Tharaldson Park; Fargo, ND	1–7	Meyer (14–7)	**Vargas (14–10)**	None	255	28–18	12–7
May 5; 2 PM	Omaha		Tharaldson Park	2–3^{(10)}	Nuismer (13–7)	**Lyle (12–7)**	None	255	28–19	12–8
May 6; 11 AM	Omaha		Tharaldson Park	3–0	**Vargas (15–10)**	Flanagan (1–1)	None	206	29–19	13–8

Post-Season (1–2)

Summit League Tournament (1–2)
Date	Opponent	Rank	Site/stadium	Score	Win	Loss	Save	Attendance	Overall Record	Summit League Tournament record
May 10–11; 4:30 PM	vs. (6) Kansas City; Played across 5/10-5/11	(3)	Jackrabbit Softball Stadium; Brookings, SD	3–0	**Vargas (16–10)**	Noble (3–14)	None	143	30–19	1–0
May 11; 2:30 PM	vs. (2) Omaha	(3)	Jackrabbit Softball Stadium	1–5	Meyer (15–7)	**Vargas (16–11)**	None	273	30–20	1–1
May 11; 5 PM	at (1) South Dakota State	(3)	Jackrabbit Softball Stadium	2–10^{(5)}	Lasey (15–6)	**Lyle (12–8)**	None	254	30–21	1–2

- Win
- Loss
- Postponement
- Bold: Bison team member
- Rankings from NFCA:
- (#) Tournament seedings in parentheses.
- All times in Central Time Zone
