= Summit League softball tournament =

- Conference softball championship
- Sport: Softball
- Conference: Summit League
- Number of teams: 6
- Format: Modified Double-elimination
- Current stadium: Jane Sage Cowles Stadium
- Current location: Minneapolis, Minnesota
- Played: 1993–present
- Last contest: 2026
- Current champion: South Dakota (1)
- Most championships: North Dakota State (10)
- TV partner(s): MidcoSN, Summit League Network

Host stadiums
- Connie Claussen Field (2027); Jane Sage Cowles Stadium (2026); Jerald T. Moriarty Field/Jackrabbit Softball Stadium (2022–25); Tharaldson Park/Ellig Sports Complex (2010, 2013–19, 2021); Missouri 3&2 Field (2012); Mary Ellen McKee Stadium (2000–01, 2003–04, 2009, 2011); Kathryn Berg Field (2006, 2008); Cacciatore Stadium (1995, 1997, 1999)

Host locations
- Omaha, Nebraska (2027); Minneapolis, Minnesota (2026); Brookings, South Dakota (2022–25); Fargo, North Dakota (2010, 2013–19, 2021); Kansas City, Missouri (2012); Macomb, Illinois (1993, 1996, 1998, 2000–01, 2003–04, 2009, 2011); Cedar City, Utah (2006, 2008); Shreveport, Louisiana (2007); Independence, Missouri (2002, 2005); Chicago, Illinois (1995, 1997, 1999); DeKalb, Illinois (1994)

The Summit League softball tournament is the conference softball championship of the NCAA Division I's Summit League. The top six finishers in the regular season of the conference's eight teams advance to the modified double-elimination tournament. In 2027 the tournament will be held at Connie Claussen Field in Omaha, Nebraska on the campus of the University of Nebraska–Omaha for the first time. The winner of the tournament receives an automatic berth to the NCAA Division I softball championship.

The league changed its name from the Mid-Continent Conference prior to the 2008 season. North Dakota State has won the most championships with 10. South Dakota (1) is the most recent champion.

== Champions ==
=== By year ===
The following is a list of conference champions and sites listed by year.

| Year | Program | Site | Most Valuable Player |
|---|---|---|---|
| 1993 | Western Illinois | Macomb, IL | Veronica Wilson, Western Illinois |
| 1994 | Illinois-Chicago | DeKalb, IL | Missy Porzel, Eastern Illinois |
| 1995 | DePaul | Cacciatore Stadium • Chicago, IL | Missy Nowak, DePaul |
| 1996 | Troy | Macomb, IL | Shawn Starling, Troy |
| 1997 | DePaul | Cacciatore Stadium • Chicago, IL | Erin Hickey, DePaul |
| 1998 | DePaul | Macomb, IL | Liza Brown, DePaul |
| 1999 | DePaul | Cacciatore Stadium • Chicago, IL | Nicole Terpstra, DePaul |
| 2000 | Western Illinois | Mary Ellen McKee Stadium • Macomb, IL | Holly Killion, Western Illinois |
| 2001 | Western Illinois | Mary Ellen McKee Stadium • Macomb, IL | Bridget Maxwell, Western Illinois |
| 2002 | Oakland | Independence, MO | Ericka Burns, Oakland |
| 2003 | Oakland | Mary Ellen McKee Stadium • Macomb, IL | Ericka Burns, Oakland |
| 2004 | Centenary | Mary Ellen McKee Stadium • Macomb, IL | Cheyenne Daries, Centenary |
| 2005 | Centenary | Independence, MO | Lindsey Jones, Centenary |
| 2006 | Southern Utah | Kathryn Berg Field • Cedar City, UT | Tiffany Burt, Southern Utah |
| 2007 | Southern Utah | Shreveport, LA | Bobbi Jo Merrill, Southern Utah |
| 2008 | Western Illinois | Kathryn Berg Field • Cedar City, UT | Nikki Marinec, Western Illinois; Samantha Valentine, Western Illinois |
| 2009 | North Dakota State | Mary Ellen McKee Stadium • Macomb, IL | Andi Padilla, North Dakota State |
| 2010 | North Dakota State | Ellig Sports Complex • Fargo, ND | Whitney Johnson, North Dakota State |
| 2011 | North Dakota State | Mary Ellen McKee Stadium • Macomb, IL | Whitney Johnson, North Dakota State |
| 2012 | North Dakota State | Missouri 3&2 Field • Kansas City, MO | Brea Konz, North Dakota State |
| 2013 | Purdue Fort Wayne | Ellig Sports Complex • Fargo, ND | Ashleigh Bousquet, Purdue Fort Wayne |
| 2014 | North Dakota State | Ellig Sports Complex • Fargo, ND | Krista Menke, North Dakota State |
| 2015 | North Dakota State | Ellig Sports Complex • Fargo, ND | Krista Menke, North Dakota State |
| 2016 | North Dakota State | Ellig Sports Complex • Fargo, ND | Kaitlyn Leddy, North Dakota State |
| 2017 | North Dakota State | Ellig Sports Complex • Fargo, ND | Bre Beatty, North Dakota State |
| 2018 | North Dakota State | Ellig Sports Complex • Fargo, ND | Jacquelyn Sertic, North Dakota State |
| 2019 | North Dakota State | Tharaldson Park • Fargo, ND | Paige Vargas, North Dakota State |
| 2020 | Cancelled due to the coronavirus pandemic | | |
| 2021 | South Dakota State | Tharaldson Park • Fargo, ND | Jocelyn Carrillo, South Dakota State |
| 2022 | South Dakota State | Jackrabbit Softball Stadium • Brookings, SD; Nygaard Field • Vermillion, SD | Tori Kniesche, South Dakota State |
| 2023 | Omaha | Jackrabbit Softball Stadium • Brookings, SD | Kamryn Meyer, Omaha |
| 2024 | Omaha | Jackrabbit Softball Stadium • Brookings, SD | Kamryn Meyer, Omaha |
| 2025 | Omaha | Jerald T. Moriarty Field • Brookings, SD | Katherine Johnson, Omaha |
| 2026 | South Dakota | Jane Sage Cowles Stadium (Note: St. Thomas is hosting the tournament on the campus of the University of Minnesota) • Minneapolis, MN | Madison Evans, South Dakota |
| 2027 | | Connie Claussen Field • Omaha, NE | |

=== By school ===
The following is a list of tournament performance listed by school.

| School | W | L | PCT | Finals | Championships | Title Years |
|---|---|---|---|---|---|---|
| Centenary | 6 | 8 | .429 | 2 | 2 | 2004, 2005 |
| DePaul | 20 | 8 | .714 | 5 | 4 | 1995, 1997, 1998, 1999 |
| Illinois–Chicago | 7 | 3 | .700 | 1 | 1 | 1994 |
| Kansas City | 13 | 23 | .361 | 3 | 0 | — |
| North Dakota | 2 | 8 | .200 | 0 | 0 | — |
| North Dakota State | 40 | 14 | .741 | 11 | 10 | 2009, 2010, 2011, 2012, 2014, 2015, 2016, 2017, 2018, 2019 |
| Oakland | 12 | 7 | .632 | 3 | 2 | 2002, 2003 |
| Omaha | 21 | 13 | .618 | 6 | 3 | 2023, 2024, 2025 |
| Purdue Fort Wayne | 13 | 16 | .448 | 4 | 1 | 2013 |
| St. Thomas | 0 | 2 | .000 | 0 | 0 | — |
| South Dakota | 20 | 23 | .465 | 4 | 1 | 2026 |
| South Dakota State | 18 | 21 | .462 | 5 | 2 | 2021, 2022 |
| Southern Utah | 16 | 22 | .421 | 4 | 2 | 2006, 2007 |
| Troy | 4 | 3 | .571 | 1 | 1 | 1996 |
| Western Illinois | 38 | 38 | .500 | 12 | 4 | 1993, 2000, 2001, 2008 |

As of May 9, 2026

- Italics indicate that the program is no longer a member of The Summit League.
