= 2022 North Dakota State Bison baseball team =

2022 NDSU Baseball team

2022 North Dakota State Bison baseball

Summit League Regular season Champion
- Conference: Summit League
- Record: 31-19 (17-5 Summit)
- Head coach: Tyler Oakes (1st season)
- Assistant coaches: Brandon Hunt; Tanner Neale
- Home stadium: Newman Outdoor Field

2022 Summit League baseball standings
	Conf.				Overall
Team	W		L	PCT	W		L	PCT
North Dakota State ‍†‍‍	17	–	5	.773	31	–	19	.620
Oral Roberts ‍‍‡‍^{y}	17	–	7	.708	38	–	18	.679
South Dakota State ‍‍‍	13	–	9	.591	22	–	23	.489
Omaha ‍‍‍	12	–	12	.500	26	–	31	.456
St. Thomas* ‍‍‍	10	–	14	.417	16	–	29	.356
Northern Colorado ‍‍‍	8	–	16	.333	12	–	39	.235
Western Illinois ‍‍‍	5	–	19	.208	8	–	44	.154
† – Conference champion ‡ – Tournament champion y – Invited to the NCAA tournament * Ineligible for the 2022 NCAA tournament due to transition from Division III; Rankings from D1Baseball

The 2022 North Dakota State Bison baseball team represented North Dakota State University during the 2022 NCAA Division I baseball season. The Bison played their home games at Newman Outdoor Field adjacent to NDSU's campus. The team was coached by Tyler Oakes in his 1st season as head coach at NDSU. Oakes had been associated with NDSU Baseball since December 2013. The Bison claimed their first Summit League Regular season title during the season, winning every conference series played.
The Bison entered the Summit League tournament as the No. 1 overall seed. They lost to Omaha to start the tournament, then beat South Dakota State to advance to the semifinals, before falling to Omaha yet again to be eliminated from the tournament. NDSU finished the season with a 31-19 record and a 17-5 record in the Summit League, the second of which is their best for the program since entering Division I.

== Previous season ==
The Bison finished last season 42-19 and 20-11 in Summit League play. This led them to the Summit League tournament where they won; beating Omaha and Oral Roberts to advance to their second NCAA tournament berth since entering Division I. It was their first conference tournament title since 2014. NDSU entered the NCAA tournament as the four seed in the Stanford Regional. The Bison lost to number 7 overall seed Stanford before winning their first NCAA Division I Tournament game against regional three seed Nevada. NDSU was eliminated from the tournament when they lost to number 17 overall seed UC Irvine.

== Personnel ==
=== Roster ===
2022 North Dakota State Roster
Pitchers: 16 - Nolan Johnson - Freshman; 18 - Jake Drew - Senior; 22 - Hayden Style - Sophomore; 24 - Evan Sankey - Senior; 25 - Riley Johnson - Senior; 27 - Ben Smith - Junior; 28 - Tyler Kliniske - Junior; 30 - Reese Ligtenberg - Freshman; 31 - Max Loven - Junior; 32 - Andrew Baumgart - Freshman; 35 - Leland Wilson - Freshman; 37 - Jaxon Edwards - Freshman; 38 - Shea Zetterman - Junior; 40 - Tristen Roehrich - Junior; 44 - Skyler Riedinger - Freshman	Catchers: 5 - Logan Williams - Senior; 7 - Will Busch - Sophomore; 15 - Bennett Freiter - Freshman; Infielders: 2 - Peter Brookshaw - Junior; 3 - Noah Dehne - Sophomore; 9 - Garret Hill - Sophomore; 12 - Drew Grindahl - Sophomore; 13 - Druw Sackett - Junior; 17 - Zach Kluvers - Freshman; 26 - Carson Hake - Sophomore	Outfielders: 1 - Terrell Huggins - Junior; 6 - Calen Schwabe - Senior; 19 - Cadyn Schwabe - Sophomore; 20 - Chase Nett - Sophomore; Utility: 4 - Charley Hesse (INF/OF) - Senior; 8 - Caden Edwards (P/INF) - Freshman; 10 - Cade Feeney (P/INF) - Sophomore; 11 - Brock Anderson (UTIL/P) - Junior; 14 - Wyatt Nelson (P/OF) - Sophomore; 33 - Hunter Koep (P/INF) - Senior; 34 - Joey Danielson (P/C) - Junior
Reference:'

=== Coaching staff ===
2022 North Dakota State Coaching Staff
Name	Position
Tyler Oakes	Head coach
Brandon Hunt	Assistant Coach
Tanner Neale	Assistant Coach
Trent Keefer	Volunteer Assistant Coach

== Schedule and results ==
2022 North Dakota State Bison baseball game log
Regular season (30-17)

February (4-4)
Date	Opponent	Rank	Site/stadium	Score	Win	Loss	Save	Attendance	Overall record	Summit League Record
February 18	at Abilene Christian		Crutcher Scott Field; Abilene, TX	3-5	Riley (1-0)	**Roehrich (0-1)**	None	342	0-1	–
February 19	at Abilene Christian		Crutcher Scott Field	7-4	**Feeney (1-0)**	Eichelberger (0-1)	**Drew (1)**	327	1-1	–
February 19	at Abilene Christian		Crutcher Scott Field	4-0	**Sankey (1-0)**	Stephenson (0-1)	**Riedinger (1)**	282	2-1	–
February 20	at Abilene Christian		Crutcher Scott Field	10-7	**Zetterman (1-0)**	Sells (0-1)	**Drew (2)**	327	3-1	–
February 25	at Dixie State		Bruce Hurst Field; St. George, UT	1-4	Holliday (0-1)	**Loven (0-1)**	None	297	3-2	–
February 26	at Dixie State		Bruce Hurst Field	2-6	Porthan (1-0)	**Feeney (1-1)**	None		3-3	–
February 26	at Dixie State		Bruce Hurst Field	6-2	**Sankey (2-0)**	Newman (0-1)	**Roehrich (1)**	313	4-3	–
February 27	at Dixie State		Bruce Hurst Field	4-6	Thomas (1-0)	**Smith (0-1)**	Hardman (1)	316	4-4	–

March (11-4)
Date	Opponent	Rank	Site/stadium	Score	Win	Loss	Save	Attendance	Overall Record	Summit League Record
March 4	at #25 Long Beach State		Blair Field; Long Beach, CA	5-4	**Loven (1-1)**	Clough (0-1)	**Roehrich (2)**		5-4	–
March 5	at #25 Long Beach State		Blair Field	2-5	Noble (1-0)	**Sankey (2-1)**	Devereaux (1)	1,403	5-5	–
March 6	at #25 Long Beach State		Blair Field	5-8	Devereaux (1-0)	**Riedinger (0-1)**	None	1,982	5-6	–
March 8	at Minnesota		U.S. Bank Stadium; Minneapolis, MN	5-2	**Johnson (1-0)**	Schoeberl (0-1)	**Riedinger (2)**	700	6-6	–
March 11	Maine		Chain of Lakes Park; Orlando, FL	9-4	**Roehrich (1-0)**	Pushard (0-1)	None	317	7-6	–
March 12	Maine		Chain of Lakes Park	Canceled, Rain					7-6	–
March 13	Maine		Chain of Lakes Park	0-7^{(7)}	Schulefand (1-0)	**Sankey (2-2)**	None		7-7	–
March 13	Maine		Chain of Lakes Park	4-2	**Feeney (2-1)**	Labonte (0-1)	**Drew (1)**		8-7	–
March 15	at Florida Atlantic		FAU Baseball Stadium; Boca Raton, FL	12-3	**Roehrich (2-0)**	Del Prado (0-1)	None	334	9-7	–
March 16	at Florida Gulf Coast		Swanson Stadium; Fort Myers, FL	8-9	Mugavero (1-0)	**Danielson (0-1)**	None	425	9-8	–
March 18	Fairfield		Centennial Park; Port Charlotte, FL	8-2	**Loven (2-1)**	Sansone (0-1)	**Roehrich (3)**	88	10-8	–
March 19	Fairfield		Centennial Park	12-9	**Riedinger (1-1)**	Tolis (0-1)	**Drew (2)**		11-8	–
March 19	Fairfield		Centennial Park	5-1	**Feeney (2-1)**	Cafaro (0-1)	None		12-8	–
March 25	at Northern Colorado		Jackson Field; Greeley, CO	20-3^{(7)}	**Loven (3-1)**	Torpey (0-1)	None	133	13-8	1-0
March 26	at Northern Colorado		Jackson Field	9-5	**Roehrich (3-0)**	Mansur (0-1)	None	137	14-8	2-0
March 27	at Northern Colorado		Jackson Field	15-1^{(7)}	**Sankey (3-2)**	Day (0-1)	None		15-8	3-0

April (9-5)
Date	Opponent	Rank	Site/stadium	Score	Win	Loss	Save	Attendance	Overall Record	Summit League Record
April 1	at Western Illinois		Alfred D. Boyer Stadium; Macomb, IL	15-6	**Loven (4-1)**	Fochs (0-1)	**Nelson (1)**		16-8	4-0
April 2	at Western Illinois		Alfred D. Boyer Stadium	6-4	**Drew (1-0)**	Rosenfeld (0-1)	None	250	17-8	5-0
April 3	at Western Illinois		Alfred D. Boyer Stadium	2-6	Kratz (1-0)	**Sankey (3-3)**	Carberry (1)	250	17-9	5-1
April 5	at Minnesota		Siebert Field; Minneapolis, MN	Canceled, Weather					17-9	–
April 9	at St. Thomas; Series Relocated - Field Conditions		Koch Diamond; St. Paul, MN	0-6	Laubscher (1-0)	**Loven (4-2)**	None	310	17-10	5-2
April 9	at St. Thomas		Koch Diamond	4-1	**Feeney (3-1)**	Esch (0-1)	**Drew (3)**	265	18-10	6-2
April 10	at St. Thomas		Koch Diamond	8-7	**Roehrich (4-0)**	Gartner (0-1)	None	205	19-10	7-2
April 12	Dakota Wesleyan		Newman Outdoor Field; Fargo, ND	Canceled, Weather					19-10	-
April 15	at Omaha; Series Relocated - Weather		Tal Anderson Field; Omaha, NE	1-0	**Loven (5-2)**	Riedel (0-1)	**Roehrich (4)**	301	20-10	8-2
April 16	at Omaha		Tal Anderson Field	2-10	Bell (1-0)	**Feeney (3-2)**	Machado (1)	303	20-11	8-3
April 16	at Omaha		Tal Anderson Field	2-0	**Drew (2-0)**	Timmins (0-1)	None	305	21-11	9-3
April 20	at Nebraska		Hawks Field; Lincoln, NE	3-4	Hood (1-0)	**Smith (0-2)**	Bragg (1)	4,462	21-12	–
April 22	at Oral Roberts		J. L. Johnson Stadium; Tulsa, OK	4-10	Kowalski (1-0)	**Loven (5-3)**	McCullough (1)	801	21-13	9-4
April 23	at Oral Roberts		J. L. Johnson Stadium	2-1	**Feeney (4-2)**	Smith (0-1)	**Drew (4)**	952	22-13	10-4
April 23	at Oral Roberts		J. L. Johnson Stadium	10-2	**Sankey (4-3)**	Coffey (0-1)	**Roehrich (5)**	884	23-13	11-4
April 26	Valley City State		Newman Outdoor Field	Canceled, Weather					23-13	11-4
April 29	at South Dakota State		Erv Huether Field; Brookings, SD	8-3	**Loven (6-3)**	McCay (0-1)	None	134	24-13	12-4

May (6-4)
Date	Opponent	Rank	Site/stadium	Score	Win	Loss	Save	Attendance	Overall Record	Summit League Record
May 1	at South Dakota State		Erv Huether Field	Canceled					24-13	12-4
May 1	at South Dakota State		Erv Huether Field	Canceled					24-13	12-4
May 3	Mayville State		Newman Outdoor Field	10-0^{(7)}	**Edwards (1-0)**	Greenburg (0-1)	None	596	25-13	–
May 6	at #5 Miami		Alex Rodriguez Park at Mark Light Field; Coral Gables, FL	0-22	Palmquist (1-0)	**Loven (5-4)**	None	2,838	25-14	–
May 7	at #5 Miami		Alex Rodriguez Park at Mark Light Field	1-16	Ligon (1-0)	**Feeney (4-3)**	None	3,018	25-15	–
May 8	at #5 Miami		Alex Rodriguez Park at Mark Light Field	4-6	Ziehl (1-0)	**Roehrich (4-2)**	Walters (1)	2,463	25-16	–
May 13	Northern Colorado		Newman Outdoor Field	7-4	**Roehrich (5-2)**	Lockner (0-1)	**Drew (6)**	308	26-16	13-4
May 14	Northern Colorado		Newman Outdoor Field	13-12^{(11)}	**Drew (3-0)**	Chase (0-1)	None	249	27-16	14-4
May 15	Northern Colorado		Newman Outdoor Field	13-6	**Sankey (5-3)**	Metz (0-1)	None	250	28-16	15-4
May 20	Western Illinois		Newman Outdoor Field	8-3	**Loven (7-3)**	Warkentien (0-1)	**Roehrich (6)**		29-16	16-4
May 20	Western Illinois		Newman Outdoor Field	7-3	**Feeney (5-3)**	Carberry (0-1)	**Drew (7)**	167	30-16	17-4
May 21	Western Illinois		Newman Outdoor Field	3-6	Rosenfeld (1-0)	**Nelson (0-1)**	None	209	30-17	17-5

Postseason (1-2)

Summit League Tournament (1-2)
Date	Opponent	Rank	Site/stadium	Score	Win	Loss	Save	Attendance	Overall Record	Summit League Tournament Record
May 26	(4) Omaha	(1)	J. L. Johnson Stadium; Tulsa, OK	2-10	Riedel (1-0)	**Loven (7-4)**	None		30-18	0-1
May 27	(3) South Dakota State	(1)	J. L. Johnson Stadium	7-4	**Feeney (6-3)**	Bishop (0-1)	None		31-18	1-1
May 28	(4) Omaha	(1)	J. L. Johnson Stadium	3-5	Bell (1-0)	**Sankey (5-4)**	Kreiling (1)	378	31-19	1-2

- Win
- Loss
- Postponement
- Bold: Bison team member
- Rankings from D1Baseball.com:
- (#) Tournament seedings in parentheses.

== Awards and honors ==
Summit League Coach of the Year

- HC Tyler Oakes

First Team All-Summit League

- OF Calen Schwabe
- DH Logan Williams

Second Team All-Summit League

- C Will Busch
- 1B Brock Anderson
- 2B Druw Sackett
- SS Peter Brookshaw
- OF Jack Simonsen
- P Evan Sankey

Summit League All-Tournament Team

- P Cade Feeney
- 2B Druw Sackett
