= 2026 Summit League softball tournament =

- Teams: 6
- Format: Double-elimination
- Finals site: Jane Sage Cowles Stadium; Minneapolis, Minnesota
- Champions: South Dakota (1st title)
- Runner-up: Omaha
- Winning coach: Robert Wagner (1st title)
- MVP: Madison Evans (USD)
- Attendance: 578 (total); 145 (finals)
- Television: Summit League Network

2026 Summit League softball standings
| | Conf. | | | | | | Overall |
| Team | W | | L | | T | PCT | W | | L | | T | PCT |
|---|---|---|---|---|---|---|---|---|---|---|---|---|
| Omaha ‍†‍‍ | 15 | – | 2 | – | 0 | .882 | 37 | – | 12 | – | 0 | .755 |
| St. Thomas ‍‍‍ | 12 | – | 5 | – | 0 | .706 | 34 | – | 19 | – | 0 | .642 |
| North Dakota State ‍‍‍ | 11 | – | 7 | – | 0 | .611 | 27 | – | 23 | – | 0 | .540 |
| South Dakota ‍‍‡‍^{y} | 7 | – | 11 | – | 0 | .389 | 21 | – | 36 | – | 1 | .371 |
| Kansas City ‍‍‍ | 6 | – | 12 | – | 0 | .333 | 16 | – | 32 | – | 0 | .333 |
| North Dakota ‍‍‍ | 5 | – | 12 | – | 0 | .294 | 28 | – | 24 | – | 0 | .538 |
| South Dakota State ‍‍‍ | 5 | – | 12 | – | 0 | .294 | 25 | – | 34 | – | 0 | .424 |
† – Conference champion ‡ – Tournament champion y – Invited to the NCAA tournament As of May 17, 2026; Rankings from NFCA/USA Today

The 2026 Summit League softball tournament took place from May 6 to 9, 2026. The top six of the league's seven teams met in the modified double-elimination tournament at Jane Sage Cowles Stadium on the campus of the University of Minnesota in Minneapolis, Minnesota. St. Thomas was the league host of the tournament, but elected to host this and the baseball tournament at the University of Minnesota. South Dakota won the tournament, defeating Omaha in final, and received the Summit League's automatic bid to the 2026 NCAA Division I softball tournament.

== Standings ==
| Place | Seed | Team | Conference | | | Overall | | | |
| Place | Seed | Team | W | L | % | W | L | T | % |
|---|---|---|---|---|---|---|---|---|---|
| 1 | 1 | Omaha | 15 | 2 | .882 | 34 | 10 | 0 | .773 |
| 2 | 2 | St. Thomas | 12 | 5 | .706 | 34 | 17 | 0 | .667 |
| 3 | 3 | North Dakota State | 11 | 7 | .611 | 27 | 22 | 0 | .551 |
| 4 | 4 | South Dakota | 7 | 11 | .389 | 16 | 33 | 1 | .330 |
| 5 | 5 | Kansas City | 6 | 12 | .333 | 16 | 31 | 0 | .340 |
| 6 | 6 | South Dakota State | 5 | 12 | .294 | 23 | 32 | 0 | .418 |
| 7 | | North Dakota | 5 | 12 | .294 | 28 | 24 | 0 | .538 |

- South Dakota State held a head-to-head tiebreaker over North Dakota, therefore - North Dakota did not participate in the tournament

== Format and seeding ==
The top six teams were seeded based on the conference winning percentage during the conference's regular season. The tournament played out as a modified double-elimination tournament, with the bottom four seeds playing each other in the single-elimination first round and the rest of the tournament as a double-elimination.

== Schedule and results ==
| Game | Time* | Matchup^{#} | Television | Attendance |
First Round – Wednesday, May 6
| 1 | 1:00 PM | No. 4 South Dakota 5 vs. No. 5 Kansas City 4 | SLN | 128 |
| 2 | 4:00 PM | No. 3 North Dakota State 2 vs. No. 6 South Dakota State 14 (5 inn.) | SLN | 128 |
Quarterfinals – Thursday, May 7
| 3 | 11:00 AM | No. 1 Omaha 0 vs. No. 4 South Dakota 1 | SLN | 148 |
| 4 | 2:00 PM | No. 2 St. Thomas 5 vs. No. 6 South Dakota State 7 | SLN | 157 |
| 5 | 5:00 PM | No. 1 Omaha 12 vs. No. 2 St. Thomas 2 (5 inn.) | SLN | N/A |
Semifinals – Friday, May 8
| 6 | 1:00 PM | No. 4 South Dakota 2 vs. No. 6 South Dakota State 0 | SLN | N/A |
| 7 | 4:00 PM | No. 1 Omaha 8 vs. No. 6 South Dakota State 0 (5 inn.) | SLN | N/A |
Finals – Saturday, May 9
| 8 | 1:00 PM | No. 4 South Dakota 1 vs. No. 1 Omaha 10 (6 inn.) | SLN | 145 |
| 9 (if necessary) | 4:00 PM | No. 1 Omaha 1 vs. No. 4 South Dakota 2 | SLN | 145 |
*Game times in CDT. # - Rankings denote tournament seed. Reference:

== All–Tournament team ==
The following players were named to the All–Tournament team:

| Player | School |
|---|---|
| Madison Evans (MVP) | South Dakota |
| Brooke Carey | South Dakota |
| Autumn Iversen | South Dakota |
| Kiya Johnson | South Dakota |
| Delaney White | South Dakota |
| Maddia Groff | Omaha |
| Rylinn Groff | Omaha |
| Bailey Sample | Omaha |
| Alexis Wiggins | Omaha |
| Akayla Barnard | South Dakota State |
| Madi Mangulis | South Dakota State |
| Amanda Vacanti | South Dakota State |
| Ella Cook | St. Thomas |
| Laken Lienhard | St. Thomas |
| Amai Hanta | North Dakota State |
| Elleana Navarro | Kansas City |
