= 2022 North Dakota State Bison softball team =

2022 North Dakota State Softball Team

2022 North Dakota State Bison softball
- Conference: Summit League
- Record: 30–23 (10–8 Summit)
- Head coach: Darren Mueller (21st season)
- Home stadium: Tharaldson Park

2022 Summit League softball standings
| | Conf. | | | | Overall |
| Team | W | | L | PCT | W | | L | PCT |
|---|---|---|---|---|---|---|---|---|
| South Dakota State ‍†‍‡‍^{y} | 18 | – | 2 | .900 | 41 | – | 13 | .759 |
| Omaha ‍‍‍ | 17 | – | 4 | .810 | 32 | – | 14 | .696 |
| North Dakota State ‍‍‍ | 10 | – | 8 | .556 | 30 | – | 23 | .566 |
| South Dakota ‍‍‍ | 11 | – | 10 | .524 | 28 | – | 25 | .528 |
| Kansas City ‍‍‍ | 9 | – | 11 | .450 | 13 | – | 34 | .277 |
| St. Thomas (MN) ‍‍‍ | 8 | – | 13 | .381 | 14 | – | 36 | .280 |
| North Dakota ‍‍‍ | 4 | – | 16 | .200 | 14 | – | 39 | .264 |
| Western Illinois ‍‍‍ | 4 | – | 17 | .190 | 8 | – | 37 | .178 |
† – Conference champion ‡ – Tournament champion y – Invited to the NCAA tournament As of June 5, 2022; Rankings from NFCA/USA Today

The 2022 North Dakota State Bison softball team was an American college softball team that represented North Dakota State University during the 2022 NCAA Division I softball season. The Bison were led by Darren Mueller in his twenty-first season, and played their home games at Tharaldson Park. They competed in the Summit League.
The Bison finished the season with a 30-23 record, and a 10-8 record in Summit League play. NDSU made it to the Summit League Tournament as the 3 seed. They defeated North Dakota and Omaha, before falling to South Dakota State and Omaha in the elimination game to be eliminated from contention.

== Previous season ==
The Bison finished the 2021 season 11–12 in Summit League play and 16–29 on the season. They entered the Summit League tournament as the 3 seed but lost to North Dakota in the first round, 5–6 in 10 innings.

== Personnel ==
=== Roster ===
2022 North Dakota State Roster
| Pitchers: 9 – Paige Vargas – Senior; 13 – Lainey Lyle – Junior; 20 – Mac Schulz – Junior; 99 – Savy Williams – Freshman; Catchers: 5 – Kaylee Moore – Junior; 7 – Avery Wysong – Senior; Outfielders: 1 – Emilee Buringa – Sophomore; 3 – Molly Gates – Sophomore; 11 – Dez Cardenas – Junior; 17 – Faith Daehlin – Freshman | Infielders: 00 – Ciara Jensen – Sophomore; 8 – Skylar Padgett – Junior; 15 – Nicole Licea – Senior; 32 – Carley Goetschius – Junior; 33 – Cameryn Maykut – Senior; 42 – Chloe Woldruff – Freshman; Utility: 14 – Reanna Rudd (C/INF) – Sophomore; 23 – Aba Turner (C/OF) – Junior |

=== Coaching staff ===
2022 north dakota state coaching Staff
| Name | Position |
|---|---|
| Darren Mueller | Head coach |
| Gerice Olson | Associate head coach |
| Kayti Grable | Assistant Coach |

== Schedule ==
2022 North Dakota State Bison softball game log
Regular Season (28–21)

February (10–4)
| Date Time | Opponent | Rank | Site/stadium | Score | Win | Loss | Save | Attendance | Overall Record | Summit League Record |
|---|---|---|---|---|---|---|---|---|---|---|
| February 11; 11:30 AM | Utah State | | Campus Diamond; Santa Barbara, CA | 10-3 | **Vargas (1-0)** | Reynolds (0-1) | None | 175 | 1-0 | – |
| February 11; 1:30 PM | at UC Santa Barbara | | Campus Diamond | 17-2^{(6)} | **Schulz (1-0)** | Mills (0-2) | None | 140 | 2-0 | – |
| February 12; 11:30 AM | Utah State | | Campus Diamond | 4-6 | Reynolds (1-0) | **Williams (0-1)** | Toone (1) | 176 | 2-1 | – |
| February 12; 4:00 PM | at UC Santa Barbara | | Campus Diamond | 3-4 | Snyder (1-0) | **Vargas (1-1)** | None | 123 | 2-2 | – |
| February 13; 10:45 AM | Utah State | | Campus Diamond | 15-9 | **Williams (1-1)** | Millemon (0-2) | None | | 3-2 | – |
| February 19; 9 AM | UT Martin | | Eagle Field; Statesboro, GA | 10-0^{(5)} | **Vargas (2-1)** | Dreiling (0-1) | None | 50 | 4-2 | – |
| February 19; 4:30 PM | Maine Black Bears | | Eagle Field | 12-2 | **Williams (2-1)** | Gruitch (0-1) | None | 84 | 5-2 | – |
| February 20; 8 AM | Maine Black Bears | | Eagle Field | 8-2 | **Vargas (3-1)** | Reid (0-1) | None | 50 | 6-2 | – |
| February 20; 10:30 AM | at Georgia Southern | | Eagle Field | 5-0 | **Schulz (2-0)** | Belogorska (0-1) | None | 269 | 7-2 | – |
| February 25; 1:30 PM | Buffalo | | Lobo Softball Field; Albuquerque, NM | 6-3 | **Vargas (4-1)** | Tarantino (2-3) | None | | 8-2 | – |
| February 25; 6:30 PM | at New Mexico | | Lobo Softball Field | 4-6 | Guindon (4-1) | **Schulz (2-1)** | Linton (2) | | 8-3 | – |
| February 26; 11 AM | UTEP | | Lobo Softball Field | 8-9 | Collins (1-1) | **Williams (2-2)** | Alarcon (2) | | 8-4 | – |
| February 26; 1:30 PM | Tarleton | | Lobo Softball Field | 8-4 | **Vargas (5-1)** | Ellett (0-1) | None | | 9-4 | – |
| February 27; 11 AM | Tarleton | | Lobo Softball Field | 9-1 | **Williams (3-2)** | Chism (3-2) | None | | 10-4 | – |

March (9–11)
| Date Time | Opponent | Rank | Site/stadium | Score | Win | Loss | Save | Attendance | Overall Record | Summit League Record |
|---|---|---|---|---|---|---|---|---|---|---|
| March 4; 3 PM | CSU Northridge | | John C Funk Stadium; Riverside, CA | 2-1 | **Vargas (6-1)** | Jamerson (0-1) | None | 53 | 11-4 | – |
| March 4; 8 PM | California Baptist | | John C Funk Stadium | 9-4 | **Lyle (1-0)** | Castaneda (0-1) | None | 309 | 12-4 | – |
| March 5; 1 PM | at UC Riverside | | Amy S. Harrison Field | 2-3 | Barbarick (1-0) | **Lyle (1-1)** | None | | 12-5 | – |
| March 5; 3:30 PM | at UC Riverside | | Amy S. Harrison Field | 7-9 | Heinlin (1-0) | **Schulz (2-2)** | None | 205 | 12-6 | – |
| March 6; 12 PM | Oregon State | | John C Funk Stadium | 1-3 | Stepto (1-0) | **Vargas (6-2)** | None | 143 | 12-7 | – |
| March 11; 1 PM | Portland State | | Jane Sanders Stadium; Eugene, OR | 0-9(9) | Grey (1-0) | **Vargas (6-3)** | None | | 12-8 | – |
| March 11; 3:30 PM | Oregon State | | Jane Sanders Stadium | 4-11 | Haendiges (1-0) | **Schulz (2-3)** | None | | 12-9 | – |
| March 12; 3 PM | at #11 Oregon | | Jane Sanders Stadium | 1-14^{(5)} | Kliethermes (1-0) | **Lyle (1-1)** | None | | 12-10 | – |
| March 12; 5:30 PM | at #11 Oregon | | Jane Sanders Stadium | 2-10^{(6)} | Hansen (1-0) | **Vargas (6-4)** | None | 1,883 | 12-11 | – |
| March 13; 1 PM | Portland State | | Jane Sanders Stadium | 9-0^{(5)} | **Schulz (3-3)** | Frost (0-1) | None | 57 | 13-11 | – |
| March 13; 3:30 PM | at Oregon State | | Jane Sanders Stadium | 1-3 | Stepto (1-0) | **Lyle (1-2)** | None | 171 | 13-12 | – |
| March 15; 4 PM | at Virginia | | Palmer Park; Charlottesville, VA | 2-0 | **Vargas (7-4)** | Houge (0-1) | None | 521 | 14-12 | – |
| March 18; 10:45 AM | Binghamton Bearcats | | Maryland Softball Stadium; College Park, MD | 5-4 | **Williams (4-2)** | Howard (0-1) | **Vargas (1)** | 121 | 15-12 | – |
| March 18; 3:15 PM | at Maryland | | Maryland Softball Stadium | 3-2 | **Vargas (8-4)** | Wyche (0-1) | None | 334 | 16-12 | – |
| March 19; 8:30 AM | Army | | Maryland Softball Stadium | 6-5^{(9)} | **Vargas (9-4)** | Farris (0-1) | None | 200 | 17-12 | – |
| March 19; 10:45 AM | Monmouth | | Maryland Softball Stadium | 6-1 | **Vargas (10-4)** | Gletow (0-1) | None | 170 | 18-12 | – |
| March 20; 9:00 AM | at Maryland | | Maryland Softball Stadium | 3-5 | Schlotterbeck (1-0) | **Schulz (3-4)** | None | 250 | 18-13 | – |
| March 26; 12 PM | at South Dakota | | Nygaard Field; Vermillion, SD | 4-5 | Edwards (1-0) | **Vargas (10-5)** | None | | 18-14 | 0-1 |
| March 26; 2 PM | at South Dakota | | Nygaard Field | 7-1 | **Lyle (2-2)** | Marquez (0-1) | None | 75 | 19-14 | 1-1 |
| March 27; 11 AM | at South Dakota | | Nygaard Field | 1-8 | Edwards (2-0) | **Vargas (10-6)** | None | 55 | 19-15 | 1-2 |

April (6–4)
| Date Time | Opponent | Rank | Site/stadium | Score | Win | Loss | Save | Attendance | Overall Record | Summit League Record |
|---|---|---|---|---|---|---|---|---|---|---|
| April 2; 12 PM | at Omaha | | Connie Claussen Field; Omaha, NE | 0-4 | Meyer (1-0) | **Vargas (10-7)** | None | 243 | 19-16 | 1-3 |
| April 2; 2 PM | at Omaha | | Connie Claussen Field | 7-2 | **Lyle (3-2)** | Hampton (0-1) | None | 392 | 20-16 | 2-3 |
| April 3; 11 AM | at Omaha | | Connie Claussen Field | 0-1 | Meyer (1-0) | **Vargas (10-8)** | None | 139 | 20-17 | 2-4 |
| April 9; 12 PM | Kansas City | | Tharaldson Park; Fargo, ND | 1-0 | **Vargas (11-8)** | Hoveland (0-1) | None | | 21-17 | 3-4 |
| April 9; 2 PM | Kansas City | | Tharaldson Park | 4-1 | **Lyle (4-2)** | Stout (0-1) | None | | 22-17 | 4-4 |
| April 10; 11 AM | Kansas City | | Tharaldson Park | Canceled, Rain | | | | | 22-17 | 4-4 |
| April 15; 12 PM | Western Illinois; Series Relocated - Weather | | Connie Claussen Field; Omaha, NE | 7-0 | **Vargas (12-8)** | Carlin (0-1) | None | | 23-17 | 5-4 |
| April 15; 2 PM | Western Illinois | | Connie Claussen Field | 12-1^{(5)} | **Lyle (5-2)** | Rodriguez (0-1) | None | 78 | 24-17 | 6-4 |
| April 16; 11 AM | Western Illinois | | Connie Claussen Field | 10-1^{(5)} | **Vargas (13-8)** | Carlin (0-2) | None | 81 | 25-17 | 7-4 |
| April 23; 12 PM | South Dakota State | | Tharaldson Park | 1-8^{(10)} | Glanzer (1-0) | **Vargas (13-9)** | None | | 25-18 | 7-5 |
| April 23; 2 PM | South Dakota State | | Tharaldson Park | 1-8 | Kniesche (1-0) | **Lyle (5-3)** | None | | 25-19 | 7-6 |
| April 24; 11 AM | South Dakota State | | Tharaldson Park | Canceled, Weather | | | | | 25-19 | 7-6 |
| April 30; 12 PM | at North Dakota | | Apollo Park; Grand Forks, ND | Canceled, Weather | | | | | 25-19 | 7-6 |

May (3–2)
| Date Time | Opponent | Rank | Site/stadium | Score | Win | Loss | Save | Attendance | Overall Record | Summit League Record |
|---|---|---|---|---|---|---|---|---|---|---|
| May 1; 11 AM | North Dakota; Doubleheader Relocated-Field Conditions | | Tharaldson Park; Fargo, ND | 10-11 | Jones (1-0) | **Williams (4-3)** | None | | 25-20 | 7-7 |
| May 1; 1 PM | North Dakota | | Tharaldson Park | 7-3 | **Lyle (6-3)** | Albrecht (0-1) | None | 121 | 26-20 | 8-7 |
| May 6; 12 PM | St. Thomas | | Tharaldson Park | 2-0 | **Vargas (14-9)** | Crawford (0-1) | None | | 27-20 | 9-7 |
| May 6; 2 PM | St. Thomas | | Tharaldson Park | 3-0 | **Lyle (7-3)** | Baniecke (0-1) | None | | 28-20 | 10-7 |
| May 7; 11 AM | St. Thomas | | Tharaldson Park | 1-2 | Crawford (1-1) | **Schulz (3-5)** | None | 413 | 28-21 | 10-8 |

Post-Season (2–2)

Summit League Tournament (2–2)
| Date | Opponent | Rank | Site/stadium | Score | Win | Loss | Save | Attendance | Overall Record | Summit League Tournament record |
|---|---|---|---|---|---|---|---|---|---|---|
| May 12 | (6) North Dakota | (3) | Jackrabbit Softball Stadium; Brookings, SD | 5-2 | **Vargas (15-9)** | Jones (0-1) | None | 151 | 29-21 | 1-0 |
| May 13 | (2) Omaha | (3) | Nygaard Field; Vermillion, SD | 2-0 | **Vargas (16-9)** | Meyer (0-1) | None | 150 | 30-21 | 2-0 |
| May 14 | (1) South Dakota State | (3) | Nygaard Field | 0-2 | Kniesche (1-0) | **Vargas (16-10)** | None | | 30-22 | 2-1 |
| May 14 | (2) Omaha | (3) | Nygaard Field | 2-3 | Meyer (1-0) | **Lyle (7-4)** | None | 120 | 30-23 | 2-2 |

- Win
- Loss
- Postponement
- Bold: Bison team member
- Rankings from NFCA:
- (#) Tournament seedings in parentheses.

== Awards and honors ==
First Team All-Summit League

- Dez Cardenas
- Cameryn Maykut

Second Team All-Summit League

- Paige Vargas
- Emilee Buringa
- Reanna Rudd

Summit League All-Tournament Team

- Paige Vargas
- Skylar Padgett
- Nicole Licea
