= 2022 Summit League baseball tournament =

- Teams: 4
- Format: Double-elimination
- Finals site: J. L. Johnson Stadium; Tulsa, Oklahoma
- Champions: Oral Roberts (20th title)
- Runner-up: Omaha
- Winning coach: Ryan Folmar (5th title)
- MVP: Holden Breeze (Oral Roberts)
- Television: Midco SN+

2022 Summit League baseball standings
	Conf.				Overall
Team	W		L	PCT	W		L	PCT
North Dakota State ‍†‍‍	17	–	5	.773	31	–	19	.620
Oral Roberts ‍‍‡‍^{y}	17	–	7	.708	38	–	18	.679
South Dakota State ‍‍‍	13	–	9	.591	22	–	23	.489
Omaha ‍‍‍	12	–	12	.500	26	–	31	.456
St. Thomas* ‍‍‍	10	–	14	.417	16	–	29	.356
Northern Colorado ‍‍‍	8	–	16	.333	12	–	39	.235
Western Illinois ‍‍‍	5	–	19	.208	8	–	44	.154
† – Conference champion ‡ – Tournament champion y – Invited to the NCAA tournament * Ineligible for the 2022 NCAA tournament due to transition from Division III; Rankings from D1Baseball

The 2022 Summit League baseball tournament took place from May 26 through 29, 2022. It initially was supposed to start on May 25, but the tournament was pushed back a day due to inclement weather in the area. The top four regular-season teams of the league's seven teams met in the double-elimination tournament held at J. L. Johnson Stadium on the campus of Oral Roberts University in Tulsa, Oklahoma. The winner of the tournament, Oral Roberts, earned the Summit League's automatic bid to the 2022 NCAA Division I baseball tournament.

== Standings and seeding ==
The top four teams from the regular season will be seeded one through four based on conference winning percentage during the double round-robin regular season. The teams then play a double-elimination tournament.

Place	Seed	Team	Conference			Overall		
Place	Seed	Team	W	L	%	W	L	%
1	1	North Dakota State	17	5	.773	30	17	.638
2	2	Oral Roberts	17	7	.708	35	18	.660
3	3	South Dakota State	13	9	.591	22	21	.512
4	4	Omaha	12	12	.500	24	29	.453
5		St. Thomas	10	14	.417	16	29	.356
6		Northern Colorado	8	16	.333	12	39	.235
7		Western Illinois	5	19	.208	8	44	.154

- St. Thomas, Northern Colorado, and Western Illinois did not participate in the tournament
- St. Thomas is not eligible for postseason play until 2026

== Results ==
First round May 26/27; MidcoSN
1	North Dakota State	2
4	Omaha	10
2	Oral Roberts	9
3	South Dakota State	4
Lower round 1
1	North Dakota State	7
3	South Dakota State	4

Semi-finals; May 27/28; MidcoSN
4	Omaha	8
2	Oral Roberts	12
Lower final
1	North Dakota State	3
4	Omaha	5

Finals; May 29; MidcoSN
2	Oral Roberts	21	–
4	Omaha	2	–

== All-Tournament Team ==
The following players were named to the all-tournament team:

Player	School
Holden Breeze (MVP)	Oral Roberts
Mac McCroskey	Oral Roberts
Kaleb McCullough	Oral Roberts
Jackson Loftin	Oral Roberts
Jake McMurray	Oral Roberts
Noah Greise	Omaha
Caleb Riedel	Omaha
Jack Lombardi	Omaha
Harrison Kreiling	Omaha
Eduardo Rosario	Omaha
Cade Feeney	North Dakota State
Druw Sackett	North Dakota State
Henry George	South Dakota State
