= 2023 Summit League softball tournament =

- Teams: 6
- Format: Double-elimination
- Finals site: Jackrabbit Softball Stadium; Brookings, South Dakota
- Champions: Omaha (1st title)
- Runner-up: South Dakota State
- Winning coach: Mike Heard (1st title)
- MVP: Kamryn Meyer (Omaha)
- Attendance: 1,723
- Television: MidcoSN

2023 Summit League softball standings
	Conf.				Overall
Team	W		L	PCT	W		L	PCT
South Dakota State ‍†‍‍	17	–	0	1.000	37	–	17	.685
Omaha ‍‍‡‍^{y}	15	–	5	.750	33	–	17	.660
North Dakota State ‍‍‍	13	–	8	.619	30	–	21	.588
South Dakota ‍‍‍	11	–	9	.550	24	–	28	.462
North Dakota ‍‍‍	9	–	10	.474	12	–	38	.240
St. Thomas* ‍‍‍	6	–	14	.300	18	–	35	.340
Kansas City ‍‍‍	4	–	17	.190	9	–	43	.173
Western Illinois ‍‍‍	3	–	15	.167	9	–	36	.200
† – Conference champion ‡ – Tournament champion y – Invited to the NCAA tournament * Ineligible for the 2023 NCAA tournament due to transition from Division III; As of May 20, 2023; Rankings from NFCA/USA Today

The 2023 Summit League softball tournament took place from May 10–14, 2023. The top six regular-season finishers of the league's eight teams met in the modified double-elimination tournament at Jackrabbit Softball Stadium on the campus of South Dakota State University in Brookings, South Dakota. The schedule for the tournament was modified a few times due to rain in the Brookings area during the tournament, with the title games suspended and moved to Sunday, May 14. Omaha won the tournament and earned the Summit League's automatic bid to the 2023 NCAA Division I softball tournament. The defending champion, South Dakota State, made the title game of the tournament but was defeated by the Mavericks.

== Standings ==
Place	Seed	Team	Conference			Overall		
Place	Seed	Team	W	L	%	W	L	%
1	1	South Dakota State	17	0	1.000	35	15	.700
2	2	Omaha	15	5	.750	28	15	.651
3	3	North Dakota State	13	8	.619	29	19	.604
4	4	South Dakota	11	9	.550	22	26	.458
5	5	North Dakota	9	10	.474	12	37	.245
6		St. Thomas	6	14	.300	18	35	.340
7	6	Kansas City	4	17	.190	9	42	.176
8		Western Illinois	3	15	.167	9	36	.200

- St. Thomas is ineligible for the Summit League and NCAA tournaments through 2026
- St. Thomas and Western Illinois did not participate in the tournament

== Format and seeding ==
The top six finishers from the regular season were seeded one through six based on conference winning percentage during the conference's regular season. The tournament played out as a modified double-elimination tournament, with the bottom four seeds playing each other in the single-elimination first round and the rest of the tournament as a double-elimination.
Due to their transition from Division III to Division I, St. Thomas is ineligible for the Summit League tournament and NCAA tournament until 2026.

== Schedule ==
Game	Time*	Matchup^{#}	Television	Location	Attendance
First Round – Wednesday, May 10
1	2:00 PM	No. 4 South Dakota 2 vs. No. 5 North Dakota 0	MidcoSN	Jackrabbit Softball Stadium	160
2	4:30 PM	No. 3 North Dakota State 3 vs. No. 6 Kansas City 0 Played across 5/10-5/11	MidcoSN	Jackrabbit Softball Stadium	143
Quarterfinals – Thursday, May 11
3	12:00 PM	No. 1 South Dakota State 0 vs. No. 4 South Dakota 2	MidcoSN	Jackrabbit Softball Stadium	273
4	2:30 PM	No. 2 Omaha 5 vs. No. 3 North Dakota State 1	MidcoSN	Jackrabbit Softball Stadium	273
5	5:00 PM	No. 1 South Dakota State 10 vs. No. 3 North Dakota State 2 ^{(5)}	MidcoSN	Jackrabbit Softball Stadium	254
Semifinals – Friday, May 12
6	2:00 PM	No. 2 Omaha 14 vs. No. 4 South Dakota 2^{(5)}	MidcoSN	Jackrabbit Softball Stadium	147
7	4:30 PM	No. 1 South Dakota State 3 vs. No. 4 South Dakota 0	MidcoSN	Jackrabbit Softball Stadium	263
Finals – Sunday, May 13
8	1:00 PM	No. 1 South Dakota State 0 vs. No. 2 Omaha 1 Played on 5/13 and 5/14	MidcoSN	Jackrabbit Softball Stadium	210
*Game times in CDT. # - Rankings denote tournament seed. Reference:

== All-Tournament Team ==
The following players were named to the All-Tournament Team:

Player	School
Kamryn Meyer (MVP)	Omaha
Rachel Weber	Omaha
Maggie O'Brien	Omaha
Lynsey Tucker	Omaha
Olivia Aden	Omaha
Shannon Lasey	South Dakota State
Tori Kniesche	South Dakota State
Rozelyn Carrillo	South Dakota State
Brooke Dumont	South Dakota State
Gabby Moser	South Dakota
Courtney Wilson	South Dakota
Clara Edwards	South Dakota
Paige Vargas	North Dakota State
Carley Goetschius	North Dakota State
Jackie Albrecht	North Dakota
Lexy Smith	Kansas City
