= 2022 Summit League softball tournament =

- Teams: 6
- Format: Double-elimination
- Finals site: Jackrabbit Softball Stadium/Nygaard Field
- Champions: South Dakota State (2nd title)
- Runner-up: Omaha
- Winning coach: Krista Wood (2nd title)
- MVP: Tori Kniesche (South Dakota State)
- Television: MidcoSN

2022 Summit League softball standings
	Conf.				Overall
Team	W		L	PCT	W		L	PCT
South Dakota State ‍†‍‡‍^{y}	18	–	2	.900	41	–	13	.759
Omaha ‍‍‍	17	–	4	.810	32	–	14	.696
North Dakota State ‍‍‍	10	–	8	.556	30	–	23	.566
South Dakota ‍‍‍	11	–	10	.524	28	–	25	.528
Kansas City ‍‍‍	9	–	11	.450	13	–	34	.277
St. Thomas (MN) ‍‍‍	8	–	13	.381	14	–	36	.280
North Dakota ‍‍‍	4	–	16	.200	14	–	39	.264
Western Illinois ‍‍‍	4	–	17	.190	8	–	37	.178
† – Conference champion ‡ – Tournament champion y – Invited to the NCAA tournament As of June 5, 2022; Rankings from NFCA/USA Today

The 2022 Summit League softball tournament took place from May 12–15, 2022. It was initially scheduled to begin on May 11 but was postponed due to severe weather. The top six regular-season finishers of the league's eight teams met in the double-elimination tournament at Jackrabbit Softball Stadium on the campus of South Dakota State University in Brookings, South Dakota. The winner of the tournament, South Dakota State, earned the Summit League's automatic bid to the 2022 NCAA Division I softball tournament. After weather delays and power outages on South Dakota State's campus on May 13, the remaining games in the tournament were moved to Nygaard Field on the campus of the University of South Dakota in Vermillion, South Dakota.

== Standings ==
Place	Seed	Team	Conference			Overall		
Place	Seed	Team	W	L	%	W	L	%
1	1	South Dakota State	18	2	.900	37	10	.787
2	2	Omaha	17	4	.810	29	12	.707
3	3	North Dakota State	10	8	.556	28	21	.571
4	4	South Dakota	11	10	.524	27	23	.540
5	5	Kansas City	9	11	.450	13	33	.283
6		St. Thomas*	8	13	.381	14	36	.280
7	6	North Dakota	4	16	.200	14	38	.269
8		Western Illinois	4	17	.190	8	37	.178

- St. Thomas and Western Illinois did not participate in the tournament
- St. Thomas is ineligible for postseason play through 2026

== Format and Seeding ==
The top six finishers from the regular season were seeded one through six based on conference winning percentage during the conference's regular season. The tournament played out as a modified double-elimination tournament, with the bottom four seeds playing each other in the single-elimination first round and the rest of the tournament as a double-elimination.

== Schedule ==
Game	Time*	Matchup^{#}	Television	Location	Attendance
Day 1 – Thursday, May 12
1	12:00 PM (first round)	#4 South Dakota 4 vs. #5 Kansas City 3	MidcoSN	Jackrabbit Softball Stadium	
2	2:30 PM (first round)	#3 North Dakota State 5 vs. #6 North Dakota 2	MidcoSN	Jackrabbit Softball Stadium	151
Day 2 – Friday, May 13
3	5:00 PM (second round)	#2 Omaha 0 vs. #3 North Dakota State 2		Nygaard Field; Vermillion, SD	150
Day 3 – Saturday, May 14
4	9:00 AM (second round)	#1 South Dakota State 5 vs. #4 South Dakota 2		Nygaard Field	
5	11:30 AM (second round)	#2 Omaha 3 vs. #4 South Dakota 1		Nygaard Field	
6	2:00 PM (semifinals)	#3 North Dakota State 0 vs. #1 South Dakota State 2		Nygaard Field	
7	4:30 PM (semifinals)	#2 Omaha 3 vs. #3 North Dakota State 2		Nygaard Field	
Day 4 – Sunday, May 15
8	10:00 AM (finals)	#1 South Dakota State vs. #2 Omaha 3	MidcoSN	Nygaard Field	
9	12:30 PM (finals)	#2 Omaha vs. #1 South Dakota State 5	MidcoSN	Nygaard Field	
*Game times in CDT. # - Rankings denote tournament seed. Reference:

== All-Tournament Team ==
The following players were named to the All-Tournament Team:

Player	School
Tori Kniesche (MVP)	South Dakota State
Emma Osmundson	South Dakota State
Cylie Halvorson	South Dakota State
Grace Glanzer	South Dakota State
Jocelyn Carrillo	South Dakota State
Jamie White	Omaha
Sydney Nuismer	Omaha
Lexi Burkhardt	Omaha
Kamryn Meyer	Omaha
Paige Vargas	North Dakota State
Skylar Padgett	North Dakota State
Nicole Licea	North Dakota State
Gabby Moser	South Dakota
Lauren Eamiguel	South Dakota
Cassie Castaneda	North Dakota
Lexi D'Ambrossio	Kansas City
