= Chris Olean =

American baseball player and coach (born 1977)

Current position
- Title: Head coach
- Team: St. Thomas (MN)
- Conference: Summit League
- Record: 413–256–1

Biographical details
- Born: May 29, 1977 (age 49); Owatonna, Minnesota, U.S.

Playing career
- 1996–1999: St. Thomas (MN)
- 1999: Ogden Raptors
- 1999: Helena Brewers
- 2000: Beloit Snappers
- 2001: St. Paul Saints
- Position: Pitcher

Coaching career (HC unless noted)
- 2001–2009: St. Thomas (MN) (P)
- 2010–present: St. Thomas (MN)

Head coaching record
- Overall: 413–256–1
- Tournaments: Summit: 0–0; MIAC: 5–6; NCAA: 0–0

Accomplishments and honors

Championships
- 8× MIAC regular season (2010–2014, 2016, 2017, 2021); 2x Summit League regular season (2024, 2025); 3× MIAC Tournament (2010, 2013, 2014)

Christopher R. Olean (born May 29, 1977) is a baseball coach and former pitcher, who is the current head baseball coach of the St. Thomas (MN) Tommies. He played college baseball at St. Thomas (MN) where he played for head coach Dennis Denning from 1996 to 1999 before playing professionally from 1999 to 2001.

== Playing career ==
Olean attended Washburn High School, in Minneapolis, Minnesota and played college baseball at University of St. Thomas (Minnesota). He was named the MIAC Pitcher of the Year in 1999. He finished his career with the 2nd most strikeouts in Tommie history with 246. Olean was then drafted in the 17th round of the 1999 Major League Baseball draft by the Milwaukee Brewers. He began his professional career with the Ogden Raptors before moving to the Helena Brewers. For the 2000 season, Olean played for the Beloit Snappers. Olean joined the St. Paul Saints during the summer of 2001.

== Coaching career ==
After serving as interim head coach for the 2010 season, Olean was named the permanent head coach of the Tommies on January 12, 2011. During their final season of playing Division III, Olean lead the Tommies to the College World Series, finishing as the runner-up. Olean will lead the Tommies into the Division I ranks as St. Thomas joins the Summit League for the 2022 season.

== Head coaching record ==
Record table
Season	Team	Overall	Conference	Standing	Postseason
St. Thomas Tommies (Minnesota Intercollegiate Athletic Conference) (2010–2021)
2010	St. Thomas (MN)	35–9	15–5	1st	NCAA Midwest Regional
2011	St. Thomas (MN)	28–18	16–4	T-1st	NCAA Midwest Regional
2012	St. Thomas (MN)	41–10	19–1	1st	College World Series
2013	St. Thomas (MN)	34–7	19–1	1st	NCAA Midwest Regional
2014	St. Thomas (MN)	39–9	18–2	1st	College World Series
2015	St. Thomas (MN)	24–16–1	11–7	4th	MIAC Tournament
2016	St. Thomas (MN)	25–15	14–6	1st	MIAC Tournament
2017	St. Thomas (MN)	29–18	16–4	T-1st	NCAA Midwest Regional
2018	St. Thomas (MN)	20–18	13–7	T-3rd	MIAC Tournament
2019	St. Thomas (MN)	20–17	11–9	5th	
2020	St. Thomas (MN)	6–1	0–0		Season canceled due to COVID-19
2021	St. Thomas (MN)	37–10	17–2	1st	College World Series
St. Thomas (MN):			169–48		
St. Thomas Tommies (Summit League) (2022–present)
2022	St. Thomas (MN)	16–29	10–14	5th	
2023	St. Thomas (MN)	10–34	6–18	7th	
2024	St. Thomas (MN)	20–24	15–10	1st	
2025	St. Thomas (MN)	29–21	21–9	T–1st	
St. Thomas (MN):		413–256–1	46–52		
Total:		413–256–1			
National champion Postseason invitational champion Conference regular season champion Conference regular season and conference tournament champion Division regular season champion Division regular season and conference tournament champion Conference tournament champion
