= 2000 NCAA Division II softball tournament =

- Format: Double-elimination tournament
- Finals site: South Commons Softball Complex; (Georgia (U.S. state)) Columbus, Georgia
- Champions: North Dakota State (1st title)
- Runner-up: Kennesaw State (3rd title game)
- Winning coach: Mitch Hanson (1st title)
- Attendance: 6,227

The 2000 NCAA Division II softball tournament was the 19th annual postseason tournament hosted by the NCAA to determine the national champion of softball among its Division II members in the United States, held at the end of the 2000 NCAA Division II softball season.

The final, eight-team double elimination tournament, also known as the Division II Women's College World Series, was played at the South Commons Softball Complex in Columbus, Georgia.

Emerging from the winner's bracket, North Dakota State defeated Kennesaw State in a single game championship series, 3–1, to capture the Bison's first Division II national title.

== Bracket ==
=== College World Series ===
First Round
Lewis (IL)	1
North Dakota State	9
Bloomsburg	6
Merrimack	0
UC Davis	11
West Florida	10
Kennesaw State	6
Mesa State	3

Second Rounda
North Dakota State	3
Bloomsburg	1
UC Davis	0
Kennesaw State	1
Second Round
Lewis (IL)	0
Merrimack	3
West Florida	12
Mesa State	4

Third Round
North Dakota State	10
Kennesaw State	5
Third Round
UC Davis	4
Merrimack	3
Bloomsburg	6
West Florida	4

Semifinals
North Dakota State	6
UC Davis	1
Kennesaw State	7
Bloomsburg	1

Championship
North Dakota State	3
Kennesaw State	1

== All-tournament team ==
- Liza Pepper, 1B, Bloomsburg
- Tanya Heath, 2B, Bloomsburg
- Nikki Flynn-Gregg, SS, North Dakota State
- Christine Hochdorfer, 3B, Kennesaw State
- Michelle Wiest, OF, North Dakota State
- Sheryl Marshall, OF, Merrimack
- Shyamala White, OF, UC Davis
- Julie Fromm, P, North Dakota State
- Lacey Gardner, P, Kennesaw State
- Melanie Anderson, C, Bloomsburg
- Gerice Olson, DP, North Dakota State
- Audra Thomas, AL, Kennesaw State
- Seeley Bair, AL, UC Davis

== See also ==
- 2000 NCAA Division I softball tournament
- 2000 NCAA Division III softball tournament
- 2000 NAIA softball tournament
- 2000 NCAA Division II baseball tournament
