= Southeastern Oklahoma State Savage Storm =

Academic offering

- University: Southeastern Oklahoma State University
- Nickname: Savage Storm
- NCAA: Division II
- Conference: Great American Conference
- Athletic director: Keith Baxter
- Location: Durant, Oklahoma
- Varsity teams: 10
- Football stadium: Paul Laird Field
- Basketball arena: Bloomer Sullivan Arena
- Baseball stadium: The Ballpark in Durant
- Other venues: Bloomer Sullivan Gymnasium
- Colors: Blue and gold
- Website: gosoutheastern.com
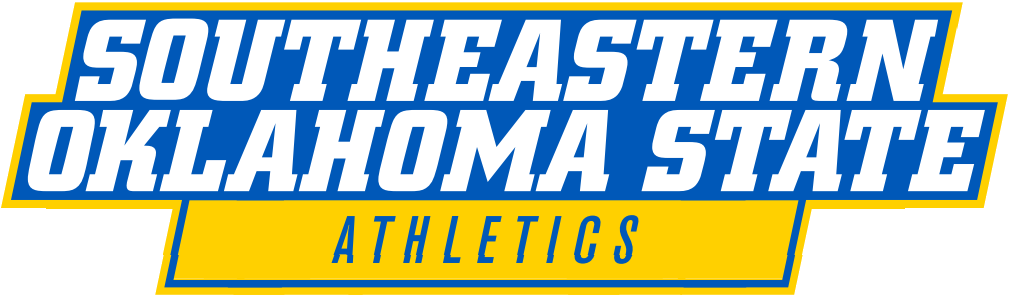

The Southeastern Oklahoma State Savage Storm (also Southeastern Savage Storm and SOSU Savage Storm), formerly known as the Savages until 2006, are the athletic teams that represent Southeastern Oklahoma State University, located in Durant, Oklahoma, in NCAA Division II intercollegiate sports. The Savage Storm compete as members of the Great American Conference for all 10 varsity sports.

== Varsity teams ==
=== List of teams ===
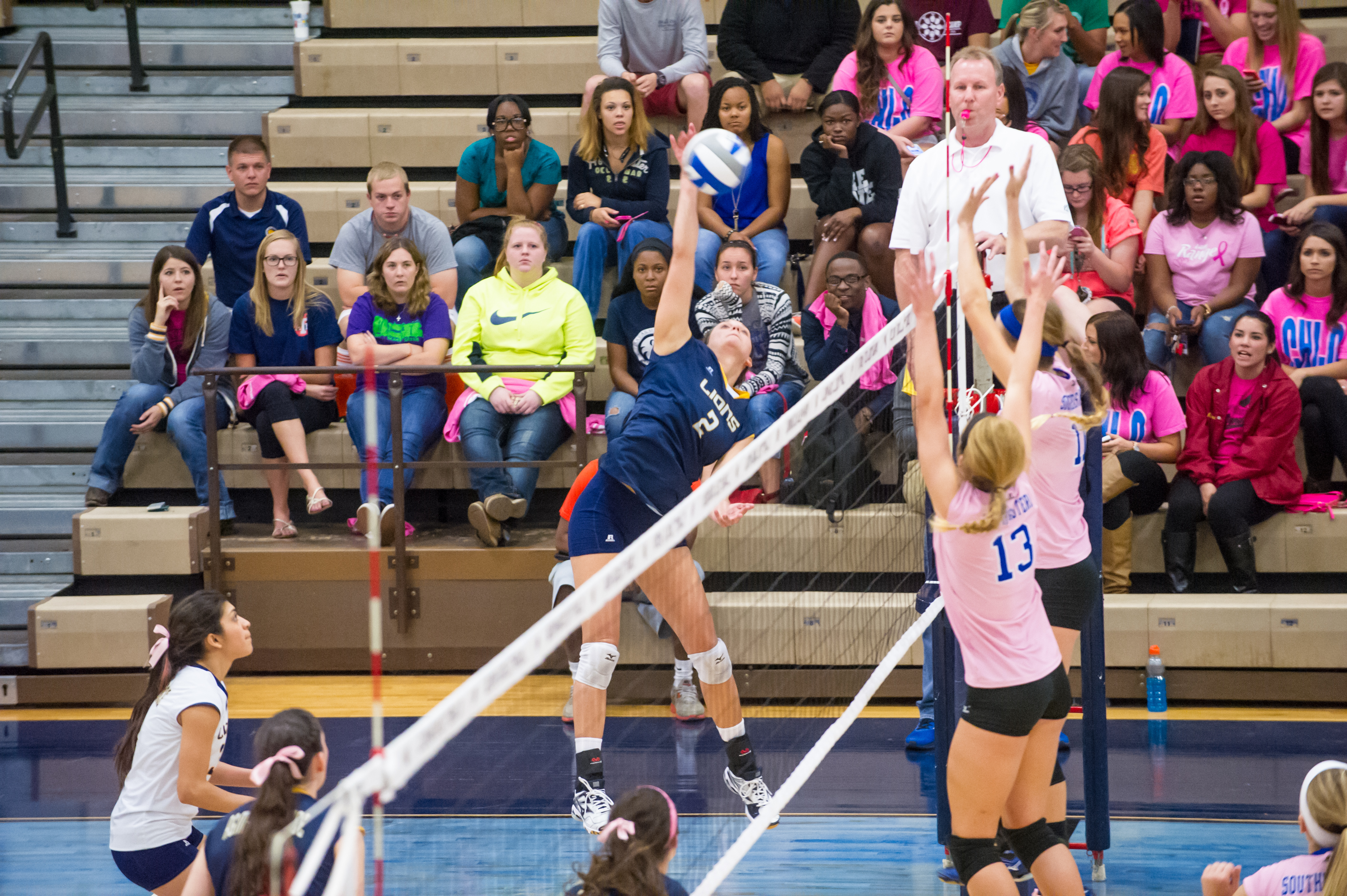
The Savage Storm volleyball team in action against the Texas A&M–Commerce Lions in 2014

Men's sports

- Baseball
- Basketball
- Football
- Golf
- Rodeo
- Tennis

Women's sports

- Basketball
- Cross Country
- Rodeo
- Softball
- Tennis
- Volleyball

== National championships ==
=== Team (1) ===
Association	Division	Sport	Year	Opponent	Score
NCAA	Division II	Baseball	2000	Fort Hays State	7–2

== Individual sports ==
=== Baseball ===
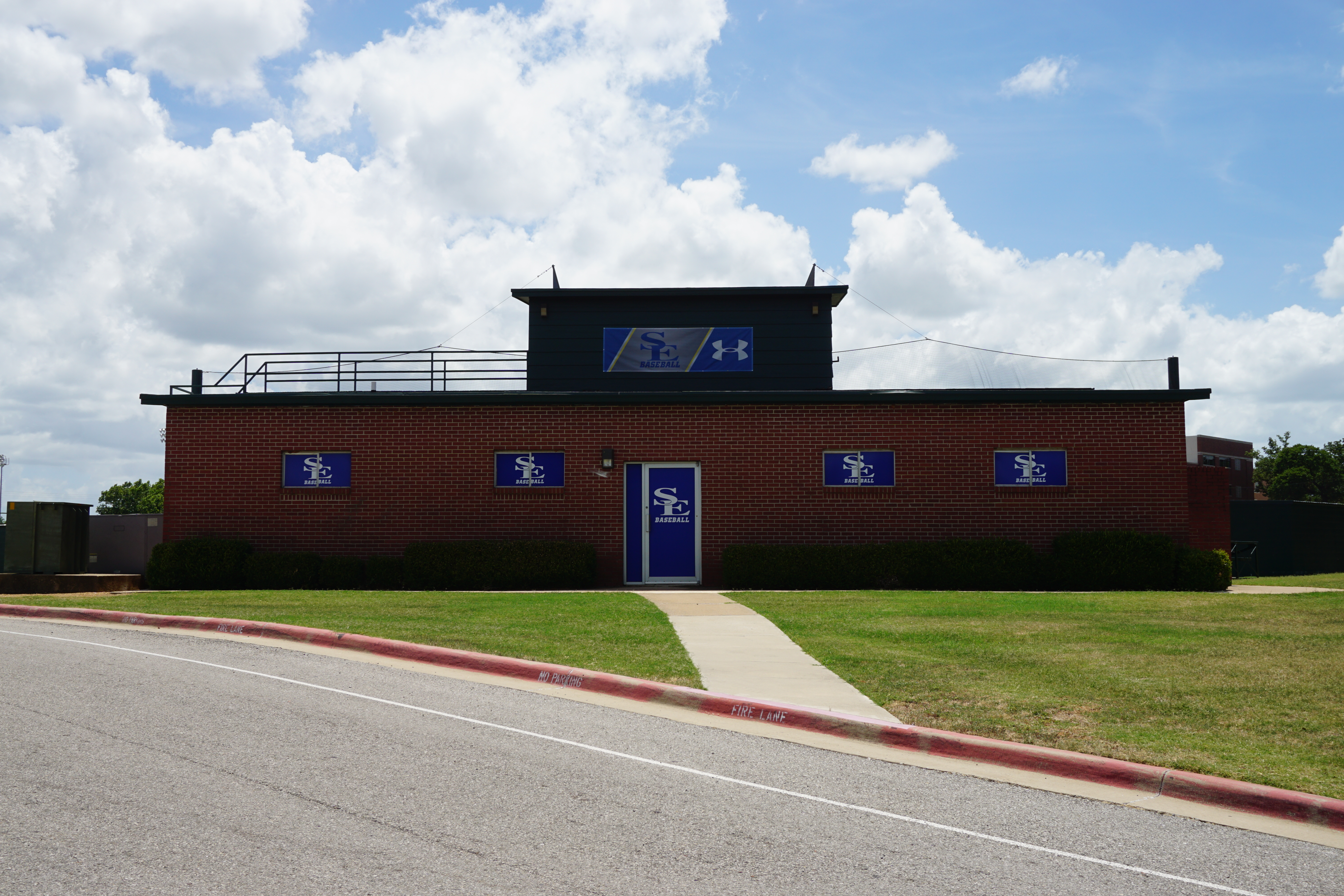
Baseball Field on the Southeastern campus

Southeastern's Baseball team has made 11 College World Series appearances, has had the most (66) All-American honors of any college baseball program in the state of Oklahoma, and 64 players have gone on to play professionally. The 2000 team won the NCAA Division II Baseball National Championship.

== Alumni ==
- Brett Butler, major league baseball player
- Daren Brown, major league baseball coach in the Seattle Mariners organization
- Jeff Frye, major league baseball player
- Earnest Hunter, former NFL Running back for the Cleveland Browns, Baltimore Ravens and New Orleans Saints
- Kirby Minter, member of the 1950 US FIBA World championship basketball team
- Crystal Robinson, professional basketball player
- Dennis Rodman, Hall of Fame basketball player, celebrity
- Jerry Shipp, captain and leading scorer of the 1964 Gold Medal Olympic men's basketball team
- Randall Burks, former Chicago Bears wide receiver
- Codey McElroy, professional American football player
