= 2000 NCAA Division II baseball tournament =

- Season: 2000
- Finals site: Paterson Field; Montgomery, Alabama
- Champions: Southeastern Oklahoma State (1st title)
- Runner-up: Fort Hays State (1st CWS Appearance)
- Winning coach: Mike Metheny (1st title)
- MOP: Aaron Thompson, P (SE Oklahoma State)
- Attendance: 20,057

The 2000 NCAA Division II baseball tournament was the postseason tournament hosted by the NCAA to determine the national champion of baseball among its Division II members at the end of the 2000 NCAA Division II baseball season.

The final, eight-team double elimination tournament, also known as the College World Series, was played at Paterson Field in Montgomery, Alabama from May 27–June 3, 2000.

Southeastern Oklahoma State defeated Fort Hays State, 7–2, in the championship game to claim the Savages' first Division II national title.

== Bracket ==
=== College World Series ===
First Rounds; May 27–30, 2000
Saint Rose	1
SE Oklahoma State	7
Indianapolis	0
North Florida	9
Saint Rose	5
Indianapolis	16
Slippery Rock	10
Central Missouri State	9
Gardner–Webb	2
Fort Hays State	6
Central Missouri State	10
Gardner–Webb	1

Second Rounds; May 29–31, 2000
SE Oklahoma State	3
North Florida	0
Slippery Rock	4
Indianapolis	9
Slippery Rock	5
Fort Hays State	8
North Florida	12
Central Missouri State	1

Semifinals; June 1, 2000
SE Oklahoma State	7
Indianapolis	1
Fort Hays State	13
North Florida	10

Championship; June 3, 2000
SE Oklahoma State	7
Fort Hays State	2

== See also ==
- 2000 NCAA Division I baseball tournament
- 2000 NCAA Division III baseball tournament
- 2000 NAIA World Series
- 2000 NCAA Division II softball tournament
