= Koch Diamond =

Baseball venue in St. Paul, Minnesota, United States

- Interactive map of Koch Diamond
- Location: Cretin Avenue S, St. Paul, MN, United States
- Coordinates: 44.945179°N 93.190971°W
- Owner: University of St. Thomas (Minnesota)
- Operator: University of St. Thomas (Minnesota)
- Capacity: 250
- Surface: AstroTurf (infield); Natural grass (outfield)
- Scoreboard: Electronic
- Field size: Left Field: 320 ft Center Field: 465 ft Right Field: 320 ft

Construction
- Groundbreaking: 2005
- Built: 2005
- Opened: April 22, 2006
- Renovated: 2017
- Cost: $300,000

Tenant
- St. Thomas (Minnesota) Tommies baseball (Summit) (2006–present)

Koch Diamond is a baseball venue in St. Paul, Minnesota, United States. It is home to the St. Thomas Tommies baseball team of the NCAA Division I Summit League. The field opened in 2006 and is named for the former St. Thomas pitcher David Koch.

== Features ==
The park is located along Cretin Avenue in the Union Park neighborhood of St. Paul. The outfield is also used as both a football and soccer practice facility, which results in the centerfield fence being the deepest in all of college baseball, at 465 feet.

== Naming ==
David Koch, for whom the venue is named, pitched for the St. Thomas baseball program in 1952.

== See also ==
- List of NCAA Division I baseball venues
