= St. Thomas Tommies (Minnesota) baseball =

NCAA Division I college baseball team

St. Thomas (Minnesota) Tommies baseball
- 2026 St. Thomas (Minnesota) Tommies men's baseball team
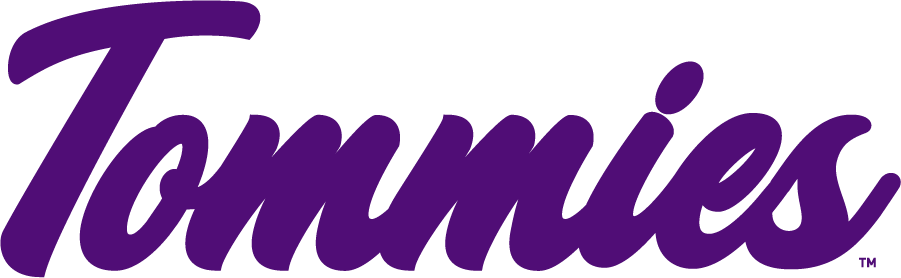
- Founded: 1920
- University: University of St. Thomas (Minnesota)
- Head coach: Chris Olean (17th season)
- Conference: Summit League
- Location: Saint Paul, Minnesota
- Home stadium: Koch Diamond (capacity: 250)
- Nickname: Tommies
- Colors: Purple and gray

College World Series champions
- Division III: 2001, 2009

College World Series runner-up
- Division III: 1999, 2000, 2021

College World Series appearances
- Division III: 1999, 2000, 2001, 2009, 2012, 2014, 2021

NCAA tournament appearances
- Division III: 1986, 1995, 1996, 1997, 1998, 1999, 2000, 2001, 2006, 2007, 2008, 2009, 2010, 2011, 2012, 2013, 2014, 2017, 2021

Conference tournament champions
- MIAC: 2000, 2001, 2002, 2004, 2005, 2007, 2008, 2010, 2013, 2014

Conference regular season champions
- MIAC: 1920, 1923, 1924, 1934, 1938, 1940, 1946, 1951, 1956, 1959, 1960, 1962, 1965, 1967, 1971, 1972, 1982, 1983, 1986, 1996, 1997, 1998, 1999, 2003, 2004, 2005, 2006, 2007, 2008, 2009, 2010, 2011, 2012, 2013, 2014, 2016, 2017, 2021; Summit: 2024, 2025

The St. Thomas Tommies baseball team is the varsity intercollegiate athletic team of the University of St. Thomas in Saint Paul, Minnesota, United States. The team competes in the National Collegiate Athletic Association's Division I and are members of the Summit League.

== History ==
The Tommies formerly competed in the Minnesota Intercollegiate Athletic Conference in NCAA Division III from 1920 to 2021. In baseball, they won 38 titles in the conference. They competed for the NCAA Division III championship on five occasions, winning two titles in 2001 and 2009.

It was announced in the summer of 2020 that they had received permission by the NCAA for a move to Division I for the 2021-2022 season, a move that skipped Division II that no program had ever done before. They are the second of two Division I teams for baseball in the state of Minnesota.
