= North Dakota State Bison softball =

- University: North Dakota State University
- Head coach: Darren Mueller (25th season)
- Conference: Summit League
- Location: Fargo, North Dakota, US
- Home stadium: Tharaldson Park (capacity: 735)
- Nickname: Bison

NCAA Tournament champions
- D II: 2000

NCAA WCWS appearances
- pre-NCAA: 1973, 1974, 1975; D II: 1999, 2000, 2001

NCAA Tournament appearances
- D I: 2009, 2010, 2011, 2012, 2014, 2015, 2016, 2017, 2018, 2019; D II: 1998, 1999, 2000, 2001, 2002, 2003, 2004

Conference tournament championships
- Summit: 2009, 2010, 2011, 2012, 2014, 2015, 2016, 2017, 2018, 2019; North Central Conference: 1999, 2002

Regular-season conference championships
- Summit: 2008, 2012, 2013, 2014, 2015, 2016, 2017, 2018, 2019; NCC: 1999, 2000, 2001, 2002, 2003, 2004

The North Dakota State Bison softball team is part of the athletic program at North Dakota State University in Fargo, North Dakota. They are members of the NCAA Division I and the Summit League. The current Bison softball head coach is Darren Mueller in his 25th season. The Bison softball team has appeared in six Women's College World Series, in 1973, 1974, 1975, 1999, 2000 and 2001.

== Head coaches ==
| # | Name | Term |
|---|---|---|
| 1 | Judy Strachan | 1976–1977 |
| 2 | Pam Larson | 1978 |
| 3 | Donna Palivec | 1979–1981 |
| 4 | Kathy Frederickson | 1982–1984 |
| 5 | Sue Collins | 1985 |
| 6 | Pam Hehrens | 1986–1987 |
| 7 | Michelle Woodward | 1988–1990 |
| 8 | Nadine Roth | 1991 |
| 9 | Karla McCrory | 1992 |
| 10 | Greg Crowley | 1993–1994 |
| 11 | Mitch Hanson | 1995–2001 |
| 12 | Darren Mueller and Jamie Trachsel | 2011–2016 |
| 12 | Darren Mueller | 2002–present |

== Postseason history ==
NCAA Division I Championships

- 2009 Norman Region Champions

=== NCAA Division I tournament ===
The Bison have appeared in 10 NCAA Tournaments. Their combined record is 10-20.

| Year | Regional | Opponent | Result |
|---|---|---|---|
| 2009 | Norman Tempe Super Regional | #7 Oklahoma; Tulsa; Tulsa #10 Arizona State #10 Arizona State | W 1-0 ^{11} W 3-2; W 4-1; L 0-11 ^{5} L 0-3 |
| 2010 | Seattle | #3 Washington; Nebraska | L 0-3; L 1-5 |
| 2011 | Tempe | #1 Arizona State; San Diego State | L 0-10^{5} L 4-5 |
| 2012 | Tucson | #13 Arizona; Hawai'i; Notre Dame | L 0-11^{5} W 9-7; L 4-8 |
| 2014 | Minneapolis | Auburn #16 Minnesota; Auburn | W 5-2; L 1-4^{10} 0-1 |
| 2015 | Eugene | Fresno State #2 Oregon; BYU; Oregon | W 4-0; L 3-4; W 7-0; L 1-6 |
| 2016 | Seattle | Minnesota; Weber State; Minnesota | L 2-7; W 5-2; L 2-7 |
| 2017 | Norman | #10 Oklahoma; Tulsa #10 Oklahoma | W 3-2^{9} L 1-2; L 2-10^{5} |
| 2018 | Tucson | Mississippi State #14 Arizona; Mississippi State | W 5-4; L 0-6; L 0-12^{5} |
| 2019 | Minneapolis | #7 Minnesota; Drake | L 0-3; L 0-8^{5} |

All seeds denote National Seeds

=== NCAA Division II tournament ===
- 2000 National Champions

=== Summit League ===
- 2008 Regular Season Champions
- 2009 Tournament Champions
- 2010 Tournament Champions
- 2011 Tournament Champions
- 2012 Regular Season & Tournament Champions
- 2013 Regular Season Champions
- 2014 Regular Season & Tournament Champions
- 2015 Regular Season & Tournament Champions
- 2016 Regular Season & Tournament Champions
- 2017 Tournament Champions
- 2018 Regular Season & Tournament Champions
- 2019 Regular Season & Tournament Champions

=== North Central Conference ===
- 1999 Regular Season & Tournament Champions
- 2000 Regular Season Champions
- 2001 Regular Season Champions
- 2002 Regular Season & Tournament Champions
- 2003 Regular Season Champions
- 2004 Regular Season Champions

== Stadium ==
- Tharaldson Park

== See also ==
- List of NCAA Division I softball programs
