= St. Thomas Tommies (Minnesota) =

Sports teams of the University of Saint Thomas

- University: University of St. Thomas
- Nickname: Tommies
- NCAA: Division I (FCS)
- Conference: Summit League; Pioneer Football League (football); NCHC (men's ice hockey); WCHA (women's ice hockey)
- Athletic director: Dr. Phil Esten
- Location: St. Paul, Minnesota
- First year: 1904
- Varsity teams: 21
- Football stadium: O'Shaughnessy Stadium
- Basketball arena: Lee & Penny Anderson Arena
- Ice hockey arena: Lee & Penny Anderson Arena
- Baseball stadium: Koch Diamond
- Softball stadium: South Field
- Soccer stadium: South Soccer Field
- Other venues: AARC Pool and Aquatic Center
- Mascot: Tommie
- Fight song: Tommie Fight Song
- Website: tommiesports.com

The St. Thomas Tommies are the intercollegiate athletic teams that represent the University of Saint Thomas in Minnesota. The school's athletic program includes 21 varsity sports teams. Their mascot is a tiger named Tommie, and the school colors are purple and gray. The university participates in the NCAA's Division I as members of the Summit League in all varsity sports except for football, which competes in the Pioneer Football League, the men's ice hockey team, which competes in the National Collegiate Hockey Conference, and the women's ice hockey team, which competes in the Western Collegiate Hockey Association. St. Thomas offers 10 varsity sports for men and 11 for women.

== History ==
Varsity intercollegiate sports began in 1904, and St. Thomas celebrated 100 years of varsity athletics in 2003–04. In 1920, St. Thomas was one of seven charter members of the Minnesota Intercollegiate Athletic Conference (MIAC). However, in 1922, St. Thomas also became a founding member of the North Central Conference. The Tommie football team played in the 1922 NCC season, but withdrew afterwards due to travel burdens. The Tommies returned to the NCC in 1926, and left permanently in 1928, when the school became a full member of the MIAC.

Since 1973, when the MIAC became affiliated with NCAA Division III, St. Thomas has won more than one-third of the conference's 39 team championships, with 15 NCAA titles in eight different sports, as well as 13 NCAA team runner-up finishes, which includes three additional sports. Overall, St. Thomas has top-five national team finishes in 21 different sports.

In May 2019, the MIAC expelled St. Thomas from the league, due to concerns about "athletic competitive parity." As Sports Illustrated put it, "St. Thomas is just too good at sports for the rest of the MIAC," which was causing other teams to consider abandoning the league and threatening its continued existence. By this time, St. Thomas had twice the undergraduate enrollment of any other MIAC school, and was one of two member schools with a 100-man football roster.

On October 5, 2019, St. Thomas officially announced its intent to move directly from Division III to Division I, a move that had not occurred since the NCAA established Divisions I, II, and III in 1973, and that was specifically prohibited in 2011. Normally a transition from Division III to I first requires teams to participate for several years in Division II, meaning the entire process would take approximate 12 years to complete. St. Thomas requested a waiver from the NCAA to allow the move, and announced that it had been invited to join the Summit League, a Division I conference that was supporting the school's waiver request.

On July 15, 2020, the NCAA granted permission for St. Thomas to move directly from Division III to Division I beginning in 2021. All but three of the school's 22 teams would compete in the Summit League; the football team would join the Pioneer Football League, a non-scholarship football-only conference with teams in New York, North Carolina, South Carolina, Florida, Kentucky, Ohio, Indiana, Iowa, and California. Men's ice hockey would join the CCHA and the women's ice hockey team would play in the WCHA. The transition process was originally intended to take 5 years to complete (as opposed to the 4 years then required of schools transitioning from Division II), meaning that St. Thomas would achieve full Division I membership in 2026. With the January 2025 approval of a Division I rule change that reduced transitional periods by one year for moves from both lower divisions, St. Thomas became a full Division I member in July 2025.

== Sports sponsored ==
Men's sports	Women's sports
Baseball	Softball
Basketball	Basketball
Cross country	Cross country
Golf	Golf
Ice hockey	Ice hockey
Soccer	Soccer
Swimming	Swimming
Track and field^{1}	Track and field^{1}
Football	Tennis
	Volleyball
^{1} – includes both indoor and outdoor

=== National championships ===
Association for Intercollegiate Athletics for Women (AIAW)

- Women's cross country 1981

National Collegiate Athletic Association (Division III)

- Women's cross country 1982, 1984, 1986, 1987
- Men's cross country 1984, 1986
- Baseball 2001, 2009
- Softball 2004, 2005
- Men's indoor track & field 1985
- Women's basketball 1991
- Men's basketball 2011, 2016
- Volleyball 2012
