= Summit League =

American college athletic conference

- Formerly: Association of Mid-Continent Universities (1982–1989); Mid-Continent Conference (1989–2007)
- Association: NCAA
- Founded: June 18, 1982; 44 years ago
- Commissioner: Josh Fenton (since 2021)
- Sports fielded: 18; men's: 8; women's: 10
- Division: Division I
- Subdivision: non-football
- No. of teams: 8 full (5 associates)
- Headquarters: Sioux Falls, South Dakota
- Region: Midwestern United States; Western United States; Southern United States
- Broadcaster: Midco Sports
- Website: thesummitleague.org

Locations

The Summit League, or The Summit, is an NCAA Division I intercollegiate athletic conference with its membership mostly located in the Midwestern United States, from Minnesota in the east, to the Dakotas, Nebraska and Colorado to the West, and Missouri and Oklahoma to the South. Founded as the Association of Mid-Continent Universities in 1982, it rebranded as the Mid-Continent Conference in 1989, then again as the Summit League on June 1, 2007. The league headquarters are in Sioux Falls, South Dakota.

The membership currently consists of nine full members plus five associate members. The most recent change in the core conference membership is the departure of two longtime members, Western Illinois University and the University of Denver. Western Illinois was the last remaining charter member of the original conference membership, and they left the conference completely by 2023 and Denver left in 2026. WIU left for the Ohio Valley Conference and Denver left for the West Coast Conference. Other recent core changes include the 2021 arrival of the University of St. Thomas, which began an unprecedented transition from NCAA Division III to Division I. A year earlier, the University of Missouri–Kansas City returned as a full member after a seven-year absence with the new athletic identity of the Kansas City Roos, while Purdue University Fort Wayne left for the Horizon League. A total of 32 schools have been full members in the league's history.

The Summit does not sponsor football, but four of its five full football-playing members play the sport in the NCAA Division I Football Championship Subdivision (FCS), and since 2025 the Summit has had a formal relationship with the single-sport Missouri Valley Football Conference, the football home of three of those four schools. The fifth member, North Dakota State University, plays football in the Mountain West Conference of the NCAA Division I Football Bowl Subdivision (FBS).

== History ==
Summit League
Location of Summit League members:
full member
affiliate member
Not shown: current affiliates Delaware and UMass

=== 1980s: Early days and foundation ===
The conference can trace its roots back to 1978, when the Mid-Continent Athletic Association was founded as a football-only conference playing in Division II at the time. Its inaugural members were the University of Akron, Eastern Illinois University, University of Northern Iowa, Northern Michigan University, Western Illinois University, and Youngstown State University; Wayne State University had also expressed interest in joining, but ultimately never did. Akron left after the 1979 season, while Northern Michigan and Youngstown State left the following year; they were replaced by Southwest Missouri State (now known as Missouri State University) in 1981. The 1981 season also saw the conference as a whole move from Division II to Division I-AA; this would be the conference's final season under the name of the Mid-Continent Athletic Association.

The new association was officially created on June 18, 1982, at the O'Hare Hilton Hotel in Chicago, Illinois as the Association of Mid-Continent Universities (or AMCU or AMCU-8, pronounced Am-cue), which it was known as until 1989. Covering all men's sports now in addition to football, the new conference consisted of current MCAA members Eastern Illinois, Northern Iowa, Southwest Missouri State, and Western Illinois, along with non-football sponsoring Cleveland State University, University of Illinois Chicago, Valparaiso University and University of Wisconsin–Green Bay. The conference continued to sponsor football at the Division I-AA level, now under the new AMCU name, from 1982 until 1984, when the football sponsoring members of the Missouri Valley Conference joined with the football sponsoring members of the AMCU to form the beginnings of what is now the Missouri Valley Football Conference; current members University of North Dakota, North Dakota State University, University of South Dakota, and South Dakota State University continue to house their FCS football programs there to this day.

Mid-Continent Conference logo, 1982–2007

=== 1990s: Changes and the addition of women's sports ===
The conference saw its first changes in the early 1990s. Southwest Missouri State departed for membership in the Missouri Valley Conference as the University of Akron and Northern Illinois University joined in 1990. Then Wright State University joined in 1991 as Northern Iowa followed Southwest Missouri State to the MVC.

Major changes came to the conference in 1992. First, Akron left for the Mid-American Conference (MAC) and another Ohio school, Youngstown State University, replaced it. More significantly, the Mid-Continent added women's sports by absorbing the North Star Conference (NSC), a women's-only league whose final seven members were in the Mid-Continent. All of the final NSC members except for Akron moved their women's sports into the Mid-Continent. At the same time, Eastern Illinois and Western Illinois moved their women's sports into the Mid-Continent when their former women's sports home, the Gateway Conference, merged into the Missouri Valley Conference. The University of Wisconsin–Milwaukee joined the Mid-Continent a year later.

In 1994, charter members Cleveland State, UIC and UWGB, as well as newer members Northern Illinois, Wisconsin–Milwaukee, and Wright State left the conference to join the Midwestern Collegiate Conference, now known as the Horizon League.

The Mid-Continent absorbed Central Connecticut State University, Chicago State University, Northeastern Illinois University, the University at Buffalo, and Troy State University (now Troy University) from the collapsed East Coast Conference in response. None of these institutions remain in the league.

The University of Missouri–Kansas City, formerly an independent, also joined the Mid-Continent Conference in 1994.

Eastern Illinois moved to the Ohio Valley Conference in 1996, reducing membership to nine programs. Troy State departed for the Trans America Athletic Conference while Central Connecticut State joined the Northeast Conference in 1997. Buffalo joined the Mid-American Conference in 1998 while Northeastern Illinois ceased intercollegiate athletics at that time. Oral Roberts University and Southern Utah University replaced the former pair while Indiana University–Purdue University Indianapolis (IUPUI; its athletic program is now IU Indy) and Oakland University moved into the latter duo's spots a year later.

=== 2000s: Renewed expansion ===
Youngstown State switched to the Horizon League in 2001, and Centenary College replaced it in 2003. Chicago State University announced in the spring of 2006 that it would withdraw from the conference to compete as an independent starting in the 2006–07 school year. Charter member Valparaiso then moved to the Horizon in 2007.

Conference expansion was discussed at length at the Mid-Continent Conference annual Presidents Council meeting in 2006, and Indiana University–Purdue University Fort Wayne (IPFW, now Purdue Fort Wayne), North Dakota State, and South Dakota State were approved for site visits. On August 30, 2006, IPFW accepted an invitation to join the Mid-Continent Conference as a full member starting July 1, 2007. Both North Dakota State and South Dakota State also accepted invitations to join the conference the next day.

=== 2010s: Continued expansion ===
The Summit League continued its renewed expansion push with the admission of the University of South Dakota. The Coyotes began conference play in the 2011–12 academic year and become eligible for all championships the following season. Centenary College subsequently announced that it would leave the Summit League following the 2010–2011 campaign.

The University of North Dakota had also been openly rumored to have been courted by the Summit League, but controversy over the Fighting Sioux nickname in all likelihood prevented UND's admission at that time. Expectations that UND would join the Summit League came to an end on November 1, 2010, when North Dakota instead accepted an invitation to join the Big Sky Conference. The University of South Dakota entered into very brief negotiations to join the Big Sky as well, rather than continuing their plans to join the Summit. However, South Dakota chose instead to remain with the more compact Summit League (along with other Dakota schools, NDSU and SDSU). As the University of Nebraska Omaha began the transition to Division I athletics in all sports, it joined the Summit League on July 1, 2012. With the departures of Centenary to Division III at the end of the 2010–11 athletic year, and Oral Roberts (Southland Conference) and Southern Utah (Big Sky Conference) for other Division I conferences at the end of the 2011–12 athletic year, the Summit League continued with nine institutions, all within the Midwest geographical region.

The conference unveiled the University of Denver (DU) as its tenth member on November 27, 2012, and the Pioneers joined in July 2013. While Denver is slightly outside The Summit's current Midwestern base, the city's status as a major air hub seemingly minimized travel issues for the other members. With Denver among the eight of ten Western Athletic Conference (WAC) members switching to other conferences, that league searched for new members. UMKC announced on February 7, 2013, that it would be one of six schools joining the WAC for the 2013–14 season, dropping The Summit League back to nine member schools. Membership fell to eight schools on May 7, 2013, when Oakland announced that it was joining the Horizon League. Eight of the nine then-current Horizon League programs were former Summit League members with Oakland's move (the Horizon has since added two more members that were never in The Summit League, Northern Kentucky and Robert Morris, as well as another former Summit member in Purdue Fort Wayne).

In December 2013, The Summit League office announced that Oral Roberts University would return to the conference in all sports, effective July 1, 2014.

The next changes to the conference's core membership were announced in 2017. First, on January 26, North Dakota, which had resolved its controversy by selecting the new nickname Fighting Hawks, unveiled as a new member beginning in 2018. Then, on June 28, IUPUI announced it would leave the conference to join the Horizon League effective July 1, 2017.

=== 2020s: Associate membership growth and declining full-time membership ===
For much of 2018, speculation involving further league expansion focused on Augustana University, a Division II school located in the Summit's headquarters city of Sioux Falls. Many of the school's boosters have ties to Sanford Health, a hospital company that has long been a major league sponsor and also owns the office complex that houses the league headquarters. The university announced on December 14 that it would start a transition to Division I, though stating at the time that no such move would take place until at least 2021. However, on May 22, 2020, the Summit League commissioner, Tom Douple, informed Augustana president Stephanie Herseth Sandlin that the conference would not be adding more new teams "at this time." The conference expanded anyway, announcing in June 2019 that UMKC would return in 2020 after a seven-year absence. However, shortly thereafter, Purdue Fort Wayne announced its 2020 departure for the Horizon League, maintaining the full-time conference membership at nine schools. Then, on October 4, 2019, the University of St. Thomas, a Minnesota school that was set to be expelled from its longtime athletic home of the NCAA Division III Minnesota Intercollegiate Athletic Conference (MIAC) in 2021, announced that it received an invitation to join the Summit upon its MIAC departure. St. Thomas eventually received a waiver of an NCAA rule mandating that Division III schools can only transition to Division II, allowing the school to move directly to D-I on the originally announced schedule.

Shortly before St. Thomas' future conference membership was confirmed, the University of Northern Colorado was announced as a baseball-only member effective in 2021–22. The most recent change to the affiliate membership was announced on May 11, 2022, when Lindenwood University and the University of Southern Indiana were announced as new affiliates in men's soccer plus men's and women's swimming & diving effective in 2022–23. Both institutions began transitions from Division II as new members of the Ohio Valley Conference (OVC), which at the time did not sponsor any of these schools' Summit League sports, in July 2022. Southern Indiana started its swimming & diving program for both sexes in 2022–23. In late March 2023, the OVC announced that it would begin sponsoring men's soccer that fall, leading to Eastern Illinois, Lindenwood, and Southern Indiana moving that sport to their full-time home. Eastern Illinois and Southern Indiana remain swimming & diving affiliates, while Lindenwood dropped both of its swimming & diving programs after the 2023–24 season.

In early May 2023, it was announced that founding member Western Illinois would be leaving the Summit League in all sports and would join the Ohio Valley Conference beginning in fall 2023. In mid-June, Western Illinois announced that its men's soccer team would remain in the Summit League for the fall 2023 season, and depart for the OVC after that.

On April 4, 2024, both entities announced that Delaware would be joining the conference as an associate member in men's soccer starting in 2025.

On May 7, 2024, the league announced that Northern Colorado, who is also an affiliate in baseball, and Weber State would be joining the league for men's golf starting in the fall of 2024. However, they would return these programs to the Big Sky Conference only a year later, which is the full-time conference for both schools.

On December 23, 2024, the league announced that UMass would be joining the conference as an affiliate in men's soccer starting in the 2025 season.

In May 2025, the Missouri Valley Football Conference, a football-only league that competes in the NCAA Division I Football Championship Subdivision, adopted a new governing structure that created a formal relationship between it and the Summit League, and also formalized the MVFC's decades-long ties with the Missouri Valley Conference. At the time, four of the five Summit members that sponsored football housed those teams in the MVFC.

On October 31, 2025, it was announced that Denver would be leaving the Summit League for the West Coast Conference in all the sports it plays in the former league, beginning on July 1, 2026.

On February 9, 2026, North Dakota State University accepted an invitation to move its football program to the Mountain West Conference after 18 years in the Missouri Valley Football Conference. This does not affect NDSU's membership in the Summit, and they will remain a full member.

On April 28, 2026, Illinois State University announced it would be discontinuing their men's tennis program after the conclusion of the spring 2026 semester.

On June 23, 2026, after the departure of Denver, and the discontinuation of the men's tennis programs at the University of North Dakota and Illinois State University, the conference dropped the sport completely. At that time, the only full league members that still sponsored men's tennis were the University of Nebraska–Omaha and Oral Roberts University, as well as associate member Drake University. Omaha and Drake moved their programs to the Mid-American Conference, while Oral Roberts moved its program to the Horizon League.

== Member schools ==
=== Current full members ===
Institution	Location	Founded	Type	Enrollment	Nickname	Joined (Note: Represents the calendar year when fall sports competition begins.)	Colors
University of Missouri–Kansas City (Kansas City (Note: Formerly branded athletically as Missouri–Kansas City (or UMKC).))	Kansas City, Missouri	1933	Public	14,732	Roos (Note: Since July 1, 2019, UMKC has branded its athletic program, previously the UMKC Kangaroos, as the Kansas City Roos.)	1994	
University of Missouri–Kansas City (Kansas City)	Kansas City, Missouri	1933	Public	14,732	Roos	2020 (Note: Kansas City left the Summit after the 2012–13 school year (under its former athletic identity of the UMKC Kangaroos on its first stint), before rejoining as a full member in 2020–21.)	
University of Nebraska Omaha (Omaha (Note: Formerly branded athletically as Nebraska–Omaha (or UNO).))	Omaha, Nebraska	1908	Public	14,972	Mavericks	2012	
University of North Dakota	Grand Forks, North Dakota	1883	Public	15,908	Fighting Hawks	2018	
North Dakota State University	Fargo, North Dakota	1890	Public	11,609	Bison	2007	
Oral Roberts University	Tulsa, Oklahoma	1963	Evangelical	5,936	Golden Eagles	1997	
Oral Roberts University	Tulsa, Oklahoma	1963	Evangelical	5,936	Golden Eagles	2014 (Note: Oral Roberts left the Summit after the 2011–12 school year, before rejoining as a full member in 2014–15.)	
University of St. Thomas	Saint Paul, Minnesota	1885	Catholic (A.S.P.M.)	9,410	Tommies	2021	
University of South Dakota	Vermillion, South Dakota	1862	Public	10,040	Coyotes	2011	
South Dakota State University	Brookings, South Dakota	1881	Public	11,901	Jackrabbits	2007	

=== Current associate members ===
Institution	Location	Founded	Type	Enrollment	Nickname	Joined (Note: Represents the calendar year when fall sports competition begins.)	Summit sport(s)	Primary conference
Eastern Illinois University	Charleston, Illinois	1895	Public	8,505	Panthers	2005	Men's swimming & diving	Ohio Valley
Eastern Illinois University	Charleston, Illinois	1895	Public	8,505	Panthers	2005	Women's swimming & diving	Ohio Valley
University of Delaware	Newark, Delaware	1743	Public	24,414	Blue Hens	2025	Men's soccer	Conference USA
University of Northern Colorado	Greeley, Colorado	1889	Public	8,869	Bears	2021	Baseball	Big Sky
University of Southern Indiana	Evansville, Indiana (Note: The campus has an Evansville mailing address but is located in unincorporated Vanderburgh County.)	1965	Public	9,488	Screaming; Eagles	2022	Men's swimming & diving	Ohio Valley
University of Southern Indiana	Evansville, Indiana	1965	Public	9,488	Screaming; Eagles	2022	Women's swimming & diving	Ohio Valley
University of Massachusetts Amherst (UMass)	Amherst, Massachusetts	1863	Public	31,726	Minutemen	2025	Men's soccer	Mid-American

=== Former members ===
All institutional names and nicknames used reflect those in the final school year of conference membership.

==== Former full members ====
The Summit League has 23 former members.

Institution	Location	Founded	Type	Nickname	Joined (Note: Represents the calendar year when fall sports competition begins.)	Left (Note: Represents the calendar year when spring sports competition ends.)	Subsequent conference	Current conference
University of Akron	Akron, Ohio	1870	Public	Zips	1990	1992	Mid-American	
University at Buffalo (Note: Also known as the State University of New York at Buffalo.)	Buffalo, New York (Note: The UB campus has a Buffalo mailing address, but is mostly located in the adjacent town of Amherst.)	1846	Public	Bulls	1994	1998	Mid-American	
Centenary College of Louisiana	Shreveport, Louisiana	1825	United; Methodist	Gentlemen & Ladies	2003	2011	American Southwest (Note: Currently an NCAA Division III athletic conference)	Southern (SCAC)
Central Connecticut State University (Central Connecticut)	New Britain, Connecticut	1849	Public	Blue Devils	1994	1997	Northeast (NEC)	
Chicago State University	Chicago, Illinois	1867	Public	Cougars	1994	2006	NCAA D-I Independent	Northeast (NEC)
Cleveland State University	Cleveland, Ohio	1964	Public	Vikings	1982 (Note: This school joined the then-Mid-Continent Conference before the league began sponsoring women's sports in the 1992–93 school year. It had previously been a member of the women's sports-only North Star Conference, which was absorbed by the Mid-Con after the 1991–92 school year.)	1994	Horizon League	
University of Denver	Denver, Colorado	1864	Nonsectarian (Note: Though founded by Methodists, Denver has been a nonsectarian institution since its founding.)	Pioneers	2013	2026	WCC	
Eastern Illinois University	Charleston, Illinois	1895	Public	Panthers	1982 (Note: Before the Mid-Con began sponsoring women's sports in the 1992–93 school year, Eastern Illinois had been a member of the Gateway Collegiate Athletic Conference, which began as a women's-only conference and added football in the 1985 fall season (1985–86 school year); EIU was a member of both sides of the conference. When the Gateway merged its women's side into the Missouri Valley Conference (MVC), EIU moved its women's sports into the Mid-Con, but kept its football team in the Gateway until it moved its entire athletic program into the Ohio Valley Conference (OVC), effective with the 1996–97 school year.)	1996	Ohio Valley	
University of Illinois Chicago (UIC)	Chicago, Illinois	1858	Public	Flames	1982	1994	Horizon	Missouri Valley
Indiana University–Purdue University Indianapolis (Note: The Indiana University and Purdue University systems dissolved IUPUI at the end of the 2023–24 school year, replacing it with separate IU- and Purdue-affiliated institutions. The new IU Indianapolis, which took over the vast majority of IUPUI academic programs, inherited the athletic program, now known as the IU Indy Jaguars.) (IUPUI)	Indianapolis, Indiana	1969	Public	Jaguars	1998	2017	Horizon League	
Missouri State University	Springfield, Missouri	1905	Public	Bears & Lady Bears (Note: The women's beach volleyball team uses the nickname "Beach Bears" instead of "Lady Bears".)	1982	1990	Missouri Valley	Conference USA
Northeastern Illinois University	Chicago, Illinois	1867	Public	Golden Eagles	1994	1998	N/A (Note: Northeastern Illinois discontinued its intercollegiate athletics program at the end of the 1997–98 academic year.)	
Northern Illinois University (NIU)	DeKalb, Illinois	1895	Public	Huskies	1990	1994	Horizon League (Note: Northern Illinois was a member of the Mid-American Conference from 1975-85, and 1997-2026.)	
University of Northern Iowa	Cedar Falls, Iowa	1876	Public	Panthers	1982	1991	Missouri Valley	
Oakland University	Rochester, Michigan (Note: The Oakland campus has a Rochester mailing address, but is physically divided between the separate cities of Auburn Hills and Rochester Hills.)	1957	Public	Golden Grizzlies	1998	2013	Horizon League	
Purdue University Fort Wayne (PFW, PU Fort Wayne)	Fort Wayne, Indiana	1964 (Note: Purdue Fort Wayne (PFW) did not begin operation until 2018, but inherited its athletic program from Indiana University–Purdue University Fort Wayne (IPFW), founded in 1964. IPFW dissolved in 2018, and the Purdue University and Indiana University systems each established a new Fort Wayne campus.)	Public	Mastodons	2007	2020	Horizon League	
Southern Utah University	Cedar City, Utah	1897	Public	Thunderbirds	1997	2012	Big Sky (Note: Southern Utah later competed as a full member of the Western Athletic Conference (WAC) from 2022–23 to 2025–26.)	
Troy University	Troy, Alabama	1887	Public	Trojans	1994	1997	Trans America	Sun Belt
Valparaiso University	Valparaiso, Indiana	1859	Lutheran	Crusaders (Note: Dropped nickname of Crusaders in February 2021; adopted new nickname of Beacons that August.)	1982	2007	Horizon League	Missouri Valley
Western Illinois University	Macomb, Illinois	1899	Public	Leathernecks	1982 (Note: The Mid-Con did not sponsor women's sports until the 1992–93 school year. Before that time, Western Illinois had been a member of the Gateway Collegiate Athletic Conference, which began as a women's-only conference and added football in the 1985–86 school year; WIU was a member of both sides of the conference. When the Gateway merged its women's side into the Missouri Valley Conference, WIU moved its women's sports into the Mid-Con, but kept its football team in the Gateway (now known as the Missouri Valley Football Conference) through the 2023 season.)	2023 (Note: Western Illinois departed the Summit League as its full-time conference on July 1, 2023, but elected to keep its men's soccer team in the league until the conclusion of the 2023 fall season.)	Ohio Valley	
University of Wisconsin–Green Bay (Green Bay)	Green Bay, Wisconsin	1965	Public	Phoenix	1982	1994	Horizon League	
University of Wisconsin–Milwaukee (Milwaukee)	Milwaukee, Wisconsin	1885	Public	Panthers	1993	1994	Horizon League	
Wright State University	Dayton, Ohio (Note: The Wright State campus has a Dayton mailing address, but is physically located in the adjacent city of Fairborn.)	1967	Public	Raiders	1991	1994	Horizon League	
Youngstown State University	Youngstown, Ohio	1908	Public	Penguins	1992	2001	Horizon League	

==== Former associate members ====
Institution	Location	Founded	Type	Nickname	Joined (Note: Represents the calendar year when fall sports competition begins.)	Left (Note: Represents the calendar year when spring sports competition ends.)	Summit sport(s)	Primary conference during associate membership	Current conference in former Summit sport (Note: Except as noted, this matches each school's current primary conference.)
University of Akron	Akron, Ohio	1870	Public	Zips	1978	1980	Football	D-II Independent	Mid-American
DePaul University	Chicago, Illinois	1898	Catholic (Vincentian)	Blue; Demons	1992	1999	Softball	Great Midwest; Conference USA (Note: When DePaul joined for softball, it was a member of the Great Midwest Conference. In 1995, that conference merged with the Metro Conference to form Conference USA.)	Big East
Drake University	Des Moines, Iowa	1881	Nonsectarian	Bulldogs	2017	2026	Men's tennis	Missouri Valley	MAC
Howard University	Washington, D.C.	1867	Nonsectarian (Note: Also a historically black college and university.)	Bison	1996	1999	Men's soccer	Mid-Eastern (MEAC)	Northeast (NEC) (Note: Howard remains a full member of the Mid-Eastern Athletic Conference, which does not sponsor soccer for either men or women.)
Illinois State University	Normal, Illinois	1857	Public	Redbirds	2017	2026	Men's tennis	Missouri Valley	—N/a (Note: Illinois State dropped men's tennis after the 2025–26 school year.)
Lindenwood University	St. Charles, Missouri	1827	Nonsectarian	Lions	2022	2024	Men's swimming & diving	Ohio Valley	—N/a (Note: Lindenwood dropped men's swimming & diving after the 2023–24 school year.)
C.W. Post of Long Island University (LIU Post)	Brookville, New York	1954	Nonsectarian	Pioneers	1994	1998	Baseball	East Coast (ECC) (Note: Currently an NCAA Division II athletic conference.)	Northeast (NEC) (Note: After the 2018–19 school year, Long Island University merged the LIU Post athletic program with the program of its other principal campus, LIU Brooklyn, creating a new Division I program that now competes as the LIU Sharks. The unified athletic program, which maintains Brooklyn's memberships in Division I and the Northeast Conference (NEC), now fields a single baseball team that plays on the Post campus in Brookville.)
New York Institute of Technology (NYIT or New York Tech)	New York, New York	1955	Nonsectarian	Bears	1994	1998	Baseball	East Coast (ECC) (Note: NYIT remained in Division I baseball through the 2017 spring season (2016–17 school year), after which it downgraded baseball to Division II and added that sport to its existing ECC membership.)	TBA (Note: NYIT shut down its athletic program after the 2019–20 school year due to COVID-19 impacts. It was expected to resume athletics in 2022–23, but has yet to do so by far or announce a future conference affiliation as of since.)
University of Northern Colorado	Greeley, Colorado	1889	Public	Bears	2024	2025	Men's golf	Big Sky	
Northern Michigan University	Marquette, Michigan	1899	Public	Wildcats	1978	1981	Football	D-II Independent	Great Lakes
Oral Roberts University	Tulsa, Oklahoma	1963	Evangelical	Golden; Eagles	2012	2014	Men's soccer	Southland (Note: Between Oral Roberts' 2012 departure for the Southland Conference and 2014 return to the Summit League, it maintained Summit associate membership in men's soccer.)	Summit
Pace University	New York, New York	1906	Nonsectarian	Setters	1994	1998	Baseball	East Coast (ECC); Northeast-10 (NE-10) (Note: When Pace joined for baseball, it was a member of the ECC (then known as the New York Collegiate Athletic Conference (NYCAC). In 1997, it joined the Northeast-10.)	Northeast-10
Quincy University	Quincy, Illinois	1860	Catholic (Franciscan)	Hawks	1994	1996	Men's soccer	Great Lakes	
Southern Illinois University Edwardsville (SIU Edwardsville or SIUE)	Edwardsville, Illinois	1957	Public	Cougars	1994	1996	Men's soccer	Great Lakes	Ohio Valley
University of South Dakota	Vermillion, South Dakota	1862	Public	Coyotes	2009	2011	Men's swimming & diving	Great West	Summit
University of South Dakota	Vermillion, South Dakota	1862	Public	Coyotes	2009	2011	Women's swimming & diving	Great West	Summit
South Dakota State University	Brookings, South Dakota	1881	Public	Jackrabbits	2005	2007	Men's swimming & diving	D-I Independent	Summit
South Dakota State University	Brookings, South Dakota	1881	Public	Jackrabbits	2005	2007	Women's swimming & diving	D-I Independent	Summit
State University of New York at Oneonta (SUNY Oneonta, Oneonta)	Oneonta, New York	1889	Public	Red; Dragons	1996	1998	Men's soccer	S.U. New York (Note: Currently an NCAA Division III athletic conference.)	
Valparaiso University	Valparaiso, Indiana	1859	Lutheran	Crusaders	2017	2020	Men's tennis	Missouri Valley	—N/a (Note: Valparaiso dropped men's tennis after the 2019–20 school year.)
Valparaiso University	Valparaiso, Indiana	1859	Lutheran	Crusaders	2017	2021	Men's swimming (Note: Valparaiso's men's aquatics program fields swimmers, but no divers.)	Missouri Valley	Missouri Valley
Weber State University	Ogden, Utah	1889	Public	Wildcats	2024	2025	Men's golf	Big Sky	
Youngstown State University	Youngstown, Ohio	1908	Public	Penguins	1978	1981	Football	D-II Independent	Missouri Valley (MVFC)

=== Membership timeline ===
Full member (all sports) Full member (non-football) Associate member (football) Associate member (sport) Other Conference Other Conference

- IUPUI was dissolved in 2024 and replaced by separate institutions affiliated with the Indiana University and Purdue University systems. The IUPUI athletic program transferred to Indiana University Indianapolis and is now known as IU Indy.
- Purdue Fort Wayne joined the league as IPFW. The athletic branding was changed to "Fort Wayne" in 2016, and to Purdue Fort Wayne shortly before the dissolution of IPFW on July 1, 2018.
- Southwest Missouri State adopted its current name of Missouri State University in 2005.
- The two former members that are part of the University of Wisconsin System, namely UW–Green Bay and UW–Milwaukee, now brand themselves for athletic purposes as "Green Bay" and "Milwaukee".
- Troy State adopted its current name of Troy University in 2004.
- UMKC rebranded its athletic program as "Kansas City" in 2019, a year before its return to the league.

== Sponsored sports ==
The Summit League sponsors championship competition in eight men's and ten women's NCAA sanctioned sports. Former full member Eastern Illinois is an associate member for men's and women's swimming and diving and men's soccer. Drake and Illinois State became associate members in men's tennis starting in 2017–18, and former full member Valparaiso rejoined for men's swimming and men's tennis at the same time. Valparaiso dropped men's tennis after the 2019–20 season; it remained a swimming associate until moving that sport to the Mid-American Conference in 2021. Northern Colorado became a baseball associate starting in the 2022 season (2021–22 school year), and Lindenwood and Southern Indiana became associates in men's soccer plus men's and women's swimming & diving in the 2022–23 school year. Eastern Illinois, Lindenwood, and Southern Indiana moved men's soccer to their primary home of the Ohio Valley Conference in 2023–24 while remaining Summit affiliates in swimming & diving. Western Illinois elected to leave the league full time in 2023, but its men's soccer team remained in the Summit through the fall 2023 season. Delaware and UMass joined for men's soccer in 2025.

Teams in Summit League competition
Sport	Men's	Women's
Baseball	6	–
Basketball	8	8
Cross country	7	8
Golf	8	8
Soccer	6	8
Softball	–	7
Swimming and diving	7	7
Tennis	–	4
Track and field (indoor)	7	8
Track and field (outdoor)	7	8
Volleyball	–	8

=== Men's sponsored sports by school ===
School	Baseball	Basketball	Cross country	Golf	Soccer	Swimming & diving	Indoor Track & field	Outdoor Track & field	Total Summit League sports
Kansas City	No	Yes	Yes	Yes	Yes	No	Yes	Yes	6
North Dakota	No	Yes	Yes	Yes	No	No	Yes	Yes	5
North Dakota State	Yes	Yes	Yes	Yes	No	No	Yes	Yes	6
Omaha	Yes	Yes	No	Yes	Yes	Yes	No	No	5
Oral Roberts	Yes	Yes	Yes	Yes	Yes	No	Yes	Yes	8
St. Thomas	Yes	Yes	Yes	Yes	Yes	Yes	Yes	Yes	8
South Dakota	No	Yes	Yes	Yes	No	Yes	Yes	Yes	6
South Dakota State	Yes	Yes	Yes	Yes	No	Yes	Yes	Yes	7
Associate members
Delaware					Yes				1
Eastern Illinois						Yes			1
Northern Colorado	Yes								1
Southern Indiana						Yes			1
UMass					Yes				1
Totals	6	8	7	8	6	6	7	7	55

Men's varsity sports not sponsored by The Summit League which are played by member schools:

School	Football	Ice hockey	Tennis	Wrestling
North Dakota	MVFC	NCHC	—	—
North Dakota State	Mountain West	—	—	Pac-12
Omaha	—	NCHC	MAC	—
Oral Roberts	—	—	Horizon	—
St. Thomas	Pioneer	NCHC	—	—
South Dakota	MVFC	—	—	—
South Dakota State	MVFC	—	—	Pac-12

=== Women's sponsored sports by school ===
School	Basketball	Cross country	Golf	Soccer	Softball	Swimming & diving	Tennis	Indoor track & field	Outdoor track & field	Volleyball	Total Summit League sports
Kansas City	Yes	Yes	Yes	Yes	Yes	No	No	Yes	Yes	Yes	8
North Dakota	Yes	Yes	Yes	Yes	Yes	No	No	Yes	Yes	Yes	9
North Dakota State	Yes	Yes	Yes	Yes	Yes	No	No	Yes	Yes	Yes	8
Omaha	Yes	Yes	Yes	Yes	Yes	Yes	Yes	Yes	Yes	Yes	10
Oral Roberts	Yes	Yes	Yes	Yes	No	No	Yes	Yes	Yes	Yes	8
St. Thomas	Yes	Yes	Yes	Yes	Yes	Yes	Yes	Yes	Yes	Yes	10
South Dakota	Yes	Yes	Yes	Yes	Yes	Yes	Yes	Yes	Yes	Yes	10
South Dakota State	Yes	Yes	Yes	Yes	Yes	Yes	No	Yes	Yes	Yes	9
Associate members
Eastern Illinois						Yes					1
Southern Indiana						Yes					1
Totals	8	8	8	8	7	6	5	8	8	8	73

Women's varsity sports not sponsored by the Summit League which are played by member schools:

School	Equestrian	Ice hockey
St. Thomas	—	WCHA
South Dakota State	ECAC	—

== Men's basketball ==
=== Men's basketball in the NCAA tournament ===
Year	Team	Seed	Results
1983	none		
1984	none		
1985	none		
1986	Cleveland State	14*	defeated Indiana defeated Saint Joseph's lost to Navy
1987	Southwest Missouri State	13	defeated Clemson lost to Kansas
1988	Southwest Missouri State	13	lost to UNLV
1989	Southwest Missouri State	14	lost to Seton Hall
1990	Southwest Missouri State	9*	lost to North Carolina
1990	Northern Iowa	14	defeated Missouri lost to Minnesota
1991	Green Bay	12	lost to Michigan State
1991	Northern Illinois	13*	lost to St. John's
1992	Eastern Illinois	15	lost to Indiana
1993	Wright State	16	lost to Indiana
1994	Green Bay	12	defeated California lost to Syracuse
1995	none		
1996	Valparaiso	14	lost to Arizona
1997	Valparaiso	12	lost to Boston College
1998	Valparaiso	13	defeated Ole Miss defeated Florida State lost to Rhode Island
1999	Valparaiso	15	lost to Maryland
2000	Valparaiso	16	lost to Michigan State
2001	Southern Utah	14	lost to Boston College
2002	Valparaiso	13	lost to Kentucky
2003	IUPUI	16	lost to Kentucky
2004	Valparaiso	15	lost to Gonzaga
2005	Oakland	16	defeated Alabama A&M**; Lost to North Carolina
2006	Oral Roberts	16	lost to Memphis
2007	Oral Roberts	14	lost to Washington State
2008	Oral Roberts	13	lost to Pittsburgh
2009	North Dakota State	14	lost to Kansas
2010	Oakland	14	lost to Pittsburgh
2011	Oakland	13	lost to Texas
2012	South Dakota State	14	lost to Baylor
2013	South Dakota State	13	lost to Michigan
2014	North Dakota State	12	defeated Oklahoma lost to San Diego State
2015	North Dakota State	15	lost to Gonzaga
2016	South Dakota State	12	lost to Maryland
2017	South Dakota State	16	lost to Gonzaga
2018	South Dakota State	12	lost to Ohio State
2019	North Dakota State	16	defeated NCCU** lost to Duke
2021	Oral Roberts	15	defeated Ohio State defeated Florida lost to Arkansas
2022	South Dakota State	13	lost to Providence
2023	Oral Roberts	12	lost to Duke
2024	South Dakota State	15	lost to Iowa State
2025	Omaha	15	lost to St. John's
2026	North Dakota State	14	lost to Michigan State

* At-large bid
** First Four game

=== Summit League championships won per school ===
School	Conference		Tournament	
School	Titles	Last title	Titles	Last title
Valparaiso	9	2003–04	8	2004
South Dakota State	9	2023–24	7	2024
Oral Roberts	7	2022–23	5	2023
Missouri State	4	1989–90	2	1989
North Dakota State	4	2019–20	5	2020
Oakland	3	2010–11	3	2011
Cleveland State	3	1992–93	1	1986
Western Illinois	2	2012–13	1	1984
Green Bay	2	1993–94	2	1994
Purdue Fort Wayne	1	2015–16	0	N/A
South Dakota	1	2016–17	0	N/A
IUPUI	1	2005–06	1	2003
Illinois-Chicago	1	1983–84	0	N/A
Northern Illinois	1	1990–91	0	N/A
Omaha	1	2024–25	1	2025
Southern Utah	1	2000–01	1	2001
Eastern Illinois	0	N/A	2	1992
Wright State	0	N/A	1	1993
Northern Iowa	0	N/A	1	1990

Italics indicate a school no longer a part of the Summit League.

== Women's basketball ==
=== Summit League championships won per school ===
School	Conference		Tournament	
School	Titles	Last title	Titles	Last title
South Dakota State	11	2024–25	12	2025
Western Illinois	6	2016–17	2	2017
Youngstown State	5	1998–99	3	2000
South Dakota	5	2021–22	4	2022
Oakland	3	2006–07	2	2006
Northern Illinois	2	1993–94	1	1993
Valparaiso	2	2001–02	2	2004
Oral Roberts	2	2010–11	5	2008
Buffalo	1	1994–95	0	N/A
Troy	1	1996–97	1	1997
Green Bay	0	N/A	1	1994

Italics indicate a school no longer a part of the Summit League.

== Facilities ==
School	Soccer stadium	Capacity	Basketball arena	Capacity	Baseball field	Capacity	Softball field	Capacity
Kansas City	Durwood Soccer Stadium	850	Municipal Auditorium (men); Swinney Recreation Center (women) (Note: The women's team will play select games at Municipal, their main arena will continue to be Swinney Recreation Center)	7,300; 1,500	Non-baseball school		Urban Youth Academy (softball)	584
Omaha	Al F. Caniglia Field	3,097	Baxter Arena	7,898	Tal Anderson Field	1,500	Connie Claussen Field	650
North Dakota	Bronson Field	—N/a	Betty Engelstad Sioux Center (Note: North Dakota also schedules basketball games at the Ralph Engelstad Arena.)	3,300	Non-baseball school		Albrecht Field (Note: North Dakota previously played at Apollo Sports Park before moving into Albrecht Field in 2024)	500
North Dakota State	Dacotah Field	2,600	Scheels Center	5,460	Newman Outdoor Field	4,600	Tharaldson Park	735
Oral Roberts	Case Soccer Complex	1,000	Mabee Center	10,575	Chapman Park (Note: Prior to 2025, the venue was known as J. L. Johnson Stadium)	2,418	Non-softball school	
St. Thomas	South Field	800	Lee & Penny Anderson Arena	5,300	Koch Diamond	250	South Field	150
South Dakota	First Bank & Trust Soccer Complex	800	Sanford Coyote Sports Center	6,000	Non-baseball school		Nygard Field	500
South Dakota State	Fishback Soccer Park	1,500	First Bank and Trust Arena (Note: Prior to a renovation completed in 2024, the arena was known as Frost Arena)	6,500	Erv Huether Field	600	Jerald T. Moriarty Field (Note: Prior to a donation and field renovation completed in 2025, the field was known as Jackrabbit Softball Stadium)	200
Affiliate members
Delaware	Stuart and Suzanne Grant Stadium	1,400	Men's soccer-only member					
Northern Colorado	Baseball-only member				Jackson Field	1,500	Baseball-only member	
UMass	Rudd Field	800	Men's soccer-only member					

== Media rights ==
On August 10, 2023, the Summit League announced the signing of a new three-year media rights deal that would tie the league with CBS Sports Network and even closer ties with Midco Sports through the 2025–26 academic year. The new deal transfers the Summit League's men's/women's basketball championship game rights over to CBS Sports Network from ESPN, and adds a guaranteed six regular-season men's basketball games on the network with an option of six more men's or women's basketball games during the season. For the 2024 tournament, CBS Sports Network will also broadcast the women's basketball tournament semifinal. In 2025 and 2026 there will remain an option to have the men's and women's tournaments semifinals on CBS Sports Network if scheduling allows.

The Midco contract will now expand to the creation of a new all-league media platform called The Summit League Network. It will provide access to all nine member institutions' live streams of every home game, both non-conference and in-conference, as well as interviews and other league info. This expansion will preserve the local media rights given out at select institutions, as the provider for the university will supply Midco with that broadcast/live stream to be simulcast on the Summit League Network.

On June 16, 2026, a four-year extension of their media rights deal with CBS Sports Network with more games being aired from 7 to 9 games, with 2 guaranteed games of women's basketball in the regular season. The conference's title games in men's and women's basketball and selected semifinals will continue to air on CBSSN.

== See also ==
- List of Summit League champions
- Summit League women's soccer tournament
- Summit League men's soccer tournament
- Summit League men's basketball tournament
- Summit League women's basketball tournament
- Summit League baseball tournament
- Summit League softball tournament
