= 2022 LSU Tigers baseball team =

2022 season of Louisiana State University baseball team

2022 LSU Tigers baseball

NCAA Hattiesburg Regional, 2–2
- Conference: Southeastern Conference
- Western Division
- Record: 40–22 (17–13 SEC)
- Head coach: Jay Johnson (1st season)
- Assistant coaches: Dan Fitzgerald; Jason Kelly; Marc Wanaka
- Home stadium: Alex Box Stadium

2022 Southeastern Conference baseball standings
| | Conf. | | | | Overall |
| Team | W | | L | PCT | W | | L | PCT |
|---|---|---|---|---|---|---|---|---|
Eastern
| No. 9 Tennessee ^{x}‍†‍‡‍^{y} | 25 | – | 5 | .833 | 57 | – | 9 | .864 |
| No. 21 Florida ‍‍‍^{y} | 15 | – | 15 | .500 | 42 | – | 24 | .636 |
| Georgia ‍‍‍^{y} | 15 | – | 15 | .500 | 36 | – | 23 | .610 |
| Vanderbilt ‍‍‍^{y} | 14 | – | 16 | .467 | 39 | – | 23 | .629 |
| South Carolina ‍‍‍ | 13 | – | 17 | .433 | 27 | – | 28 | .491 |
| Kentucky ‍‍‍ | 12 | – | 18 | .400 | 33 | – | 26 | .559 |
| Missouri ‍‍‍ | 10 | – | 20 | .333 | 28 | – | 23 | .549 |
Western
| No. 3 Texas A&M ^{x}‍‍‍^{y} | 19 | – | 11 | .633 | 44 | – | 20 | .688 |
| No. 4 Arkansas ‍‍‍^{y} | 18 | – | 12 | .600 | 46 | – | 21 | .687 |
| No. 25 LSU ‍‍‍^{y} | 17 | – | 13 | .567 | 40 | – | 22 | .645 |
| No. 7 Auburn ‍‍‍^{y} | 16 | – | 13 | .552 | 43 | – | 22 | .662 |
| No. 1 Ole Miss ‍‍‍^{y} | 14 | – | 16 | .467 | 42 | – | 23 | .646 |
| Alabama ‍‍‍ | 12 | – | 17 | .414 | 31 | – | 27 | .534 |
| Mississippi State ‍‍‍ | 9 | – | 21 | .300 | 26 | – | 30 | .464 |
x – Division champion † – Conference champion ‡ – Tournament champion y – Invited to the NCAA tournament Rankings from D1Baseball

The 2022 LSU Tigers baseball team represented Louisiana State University in the 2022 NCAA Division I baseball season. The Tigers played their home games at Alex Box Stadium.

After the season, pitcher Eric Reyzelman was picked in the 5th round of the MLB Draft by the New York Yankees.

== Previous season ==
The Tigers' season was marked with inconsistency, as the team began the year 15–3 in non-conference play, but then struggled against their early SEC competition, going 1–8 through their first three series. The Tigers finished their SEC schedule 12–9 after the rough start, yet went one-and-done in the SEC tournament after losing their opener to Georgia, going winless in the SEC Tournament for the first time since 2005. Still, the Tigers earned a berth in the NCAA tournament, where they won the Eugene Regional by beating regional host Oregon despite losing their opening game. After advancing to the Knoxville Super Regional, the Tigers' season ended after losing to No. 3 overall seeded Tennessee in two games. The Tigers finished 2021 38–25 overall, 13–17 in the SEC, with a final ranking of 18 in both the USA Today Coaches' and D1 Baseball Polls.

== Preseason ==
=== SEC Coaches poll ===
The SEC coaches poll was released in February at the SEC Media Days.

Media poll (West)
| Predicted finish | Team | Votes (1st place) |
| 1 | Arkansas | 5 |
| T-2 | Ole Miss | 4 |
| T-2 | Mississippi State | 4 |
| 5 | Alabama | |
| 6 | Texas A&M | |
| 7 | Auburn | |

=== Preseason All-SEC teams ===
The preseason All-SEC teams was revealed in February at the SEC Media Days.

== Personnel ==
=== Roster ===
2022 LSU Tigers roster
| Pitchers: 0 – Jason Bollman – Junior; 9 – Ty Floyd – Sophomore; 21 – Bryce Collins – Sophomore; 22 – Eric Reyzelman – Sophomore; 28 – Devin Fontenot – Graduate Student; 30 – Trent Vietmeier – Graduate Student; 32 – Trey Shaffer – Graduate Student; 33 – Michael Fowler – Sophomore; 34 – Cale Lansville – Freshman; 35 – Paul Gervase – Junior; 38 – Riley Cooper – Sophomore; 40 – Grant Fontenot – Freshman; 43 – Garrett Edwards – Sophomore; 44 – Blake Money – Sophomore; 45 – Samuel Dutton – Freshman; 47 – Jacob Hasty – Sophomore; 48 – Will Hellmers – Sophomore; 49 – Javen Coleman – Sophomore; 50 – Grant Taylor – Freshman; 52 – Ma'Khail Hilliard – Senior | Catchers: 20 – Alex Milazzo – Sophomore; 25 – Hayden Travinski – Sophomore; 26 – Tyler McManus – Graduate Student; Infielders: 1 – Brennan Holt – Freshman; 4 – Cade Doughty – Sophomore; 13 – Jordan Thompson – Sophomore; 14 – Jacob Berry – Sophomore; 16 – Collier Cranford – Sophomore; 17 – Will Safford – Sophomore; 18 – Tre' Morgan – Sophomore; 24 – Cade Beloso – Junior; 29 – Luke Leto – Freshman; 37 – Connor Simon – Freshman; 53 – Jack Merrifield – Sophomore | Outfielders: 3 – Dylan Crews – Sophomore; 7 – Giovanni Digiacomo – Junior; 8 – Gavin Dugas – Junior; 10 – Brody Drost – Sophomore; 39 – Josh Pearson – Freshman; 41 – Josh Stevenson – Freshman; Utility: 5 – Drew Bianco (INF/OF) – Junior; 6 – Brayden Jobert (OF/1B) – Sophomore |

=== Coaching staff ===
2022 LSU Tigers coaching staff
| Name | Position |
|---|---|
| Jay Johnson | Head coach |
| Dan Fitzgerald | Assistant coach/Recruiting Coordinator |
| Jason Kelly | Pitching Coach |
| Marc Wanaka | Assistant coach |
| Tyler Nordgren | Director of Operations |
| Jamie Tutko | Director of Video and Scouting |

== Schedule and results ==
2022 LSU Tigers baseball game log (40–22)
Regular season (37–18)

February (7–1)
| Date | Opponent | Rank | Site/stadium | Score | Win | Loss | Save | TV | Attendance | Overall record | SEC record |
|---|---|---|---|---|---|---|---|---|---|---|---|
| February 18 | Maine | No. 8 | Alex Box Stadium; Baton Rouge, LA | W 13–1 | Blake Money (1–0) | Brett Erwin (0–1) | None | SECN+ | 11,036 | 1–0 | |
| February 19 | Maine | No. 8 | Alex Box Stadium | W 17–8 | Javen Coleman (1–0) | Noah Lewis (0–1) | None | SECN+ | 10,816 | 2–0 | |
| February 20 | Maine | No. 8 | Alex Box Stadium | W 21–6 | Ty Floyd (1–0) | Jordan Schulefand (0–1) | None | SECN+ | 10,303 | 3–0 | |
| February 23 | at Louisiana Tech | No. 8 | J. C. Love Field at Pat Patterson Park; Ruston, LA | L 6–11 | Cade Gibson (1–0) | Riley Cooper (0–1) | None | ESPN+ | 2,529 | 3–1 | |
| February 25 | Towson | No. 8 | Alex Box Stadium | W 6–0 | Blake Money (2–0) | Teddy Blumenauer (0–2) | None | SECN+ | 10,042 | 4–1 | |
| February 26 | Southern | No. 8 | Alex Box Stadium | W 9–2 | Paul Gervase (1–0) | Jerry Burkett II (0–1) | None | SECN+ | 10,081 | 5–1 | |
| February 27 | Towson | No. 8 | Alex Box Stadium | W 11–1 | Ty Floyd (2–0) | Nick Ramanjulu (0–2) | None | SECN+ | 9,787 | 6–1 | |
| February 27 | Southern | No. 8 | Alex Box Stadium | W 15–0^{7} | Will Hellmers (1–0) | Mykel Page (0–1) | None | SECN+ | 9,886 | 7–1 | |

March (11–7)
| Date | Opponent | Rank | Site/stadium | Score | Win | Loss | Save | TV | Attendance | Overall record | SEC record |
|---|---|---|---|---|---|---|---|---|---|---|---|
| March 2 | New Orleans | No. 7 | Alex Box Stadium | W 11–3 | Grant Taylor (1–0) | Kyle Khachadourian (0–1) | None | SECN+ | 10,203 | 8–1 | |
Shriners Children's College Classic
| March 4 | vs. Oklahoma | No. 7 | Minute Maid Park; Houston, TX | W 5–4^{11} | Bryce Collins (1–0) | Griffin Miller (0–1) | None | AT&T SportsNet Southwest | 16,515 | 9–1 | |
| March 5 | vs. No. 1 Texas | No. 7 | Minute Maid Park | L 1–6 | Tristan Stevens (3–0) | Ty Floyd (2–1) | Luke Harrison (1) | AT&T SportsNet Southwest | 24,787 | 9–2 | |
| March 6 | vs. Baylor | No. 7 | Minute Maid Park | L 6–9 | Matt Voelker (1–1) | Paul Gervase (1–1) | Mason Marriott (1) | AT&T SportsNet Southwest | 12,577 | 9–3 | |
| March 9 | McNeese State | No. 12 | Alex Box Stadium | W 6–3 | Will Hellmers (2–0) | Christian Vega (1–1) | None | SECN+ | 9,907 | 10–3 | |
| March 11 | Bethune–Cookman | No. 12 | Alex Box Stadium | W 8–7 | Devin Fontenot (1–0) | Knickolas Billings (0–1) | None | SECN+ | 9,702 | 11–3 | |
| March 12 | Bethune–Cookman | No. 12 | Alex Box Stadium | W 5–1 | Ty Floyd (3–1) | Nolan Santos (1–1) | Eric Reyzelman (1) | SECN+ | 10,102 | 12–3 | |
| March 13 | Bethune–Cookman | No. 12 | Alex Box Stadium | W 15–0 | Ma'khail Hilliard (1–0) | Hector Vazquez (1–2) | None | SECN+ | 10,008 | 13–3 | |
| March 15 | Tulane | No. 13 | Alex Box Stadium | W 7–5 | Eric Reyzelman (1–0) | Carter Robinson (1–2) | Devin Fontenot (1) | SECN+ | 10,552 | 14–3 | |
| March 18 | Texas A&M | No. 13 | Alex Box Stadium | L 4–6 | Chris Cortez (3–1) | Eric Reyzelman (1–1) | None | SECN+ | 10,538 | 14–4 | 0–1 |
| March 19 | Texas A&M | No. 13 | Alex Box Stadium | L 7–11 | Robert Hogan (1–1) | Devin Fontenot (1–1) | None | SECN+ | 10,904 | 14–5 | 0–2 |
| March 20 | Texas A&M | No. 13 | Alex Box Stadium | W 7–6 | Riley Cooper (1–1) | Jacob Palisch (2–2) | None | SECN | 10,261 | 15–5 | 1–2 |
| March 23 | Louisiana Tech | No. 21 | Alex Box Stadium | L 6–7^{12} | Kyle Crigger (2–1) | Ty Floyd (3–2) | None | SECN+ | 10,314 | 15–6 | |
| March 25 | at No. 8 Florida | No. 21 | Florida Ballpark; Gainesville, FL | L 2–7 | Hunter Barco (5–1) | Blake Money (2–1) | None | SECN | 6,226 | 15–7 | 1–3 |
| March 26 | at No. 8 Florida | No. 21 | Florida Ballpark | W 16–4 | Ma'Khail Hilliard (2–0) | Brandon Sproat (3–2) | None | SECN+ | 8,306 | 16–7 | 2–3 |
| March 27 | at No. 8 Florida | No. 21 | Florida Ballpark | W 11–2 | Grant Taylor (2–0) | Ryan Slater (2–1) | None | SECN+ | 5,746 | 17–7 | 3–3 |
| March 29 | Louisiana–Monroe | No. 13 | Alex Box Stadium | W 15–4 | Trent Vietmeier (1–0) | Mikel Howell (0–1) | None | SECN+ | 10,206 | 18–7 | |
| March 31 | Auburn | No. 13 | Alex Box Stadium | L 5–6 | Carson Skipper (2–0) | Blake Money (2–2) | Blake Burkhalter (1) | SECN | 10,247 | 18–8 | 3–4 |

April (10–6)
| Date | Opponent | Rank | Site/stadium | Score | Win | Loss | Save | TV | Attendance | Overall record | SEC record |
|---|---|---|---|---|---|---|---|---|---|---|---|
| April 1 | Auburn | No. 13 | Alex Box Stadium | W 9–2 | Ma'Khail Hilliard (3–0) | Trace Bright (2–2) | None | SECN+ | 11,111 | 19–8 | 4–4 |
| April 2 | Auburn | No. 13 | Alex Box Stadium | L 4–6 | Joseph Gonzalez (3–0) | Samuel Dutton (0–1) | Blake Burkhalter (6) | SECN+ | 11,071 | 19–9 | 4–5 |
| April 5 | Grambling State | No. 19 | Alex Box Stadium | W 16–3^{7} | Grant Taylor (3–0) | Roy Peguero (1–3) | None | SECN+ | 9,789 | 20–9 | |
| April 8 | at Mississippi State | No. 19 | Dudy Noble Field; Starkville, MS | W 5–2 | Riley Cooper (2–1) | Jackson Fristoe (3–3) | Paul Gervase (1) | SECN | 11,893 | 21–9 | 5–5 |
| April 9 | at Mississippi State | No. 19 | Dudy Noble Field | W 4–3 | Devin Fontenot (2–1) | Brandon Smith (2–2) | Paul Gervase (2) | SECN+ | 14,228 | 22–9 | 6–5 |
| April 10 | at Mississippi State | No. 19 | Dudy Noble Field | W 13–3 | Grant Taylor (4–0) | Cade Smith (4–2) | None | SECN+ | 10,515 | 23–9 | 7–5 |
| April 14 | at No. 6 Arkansas | No. 15 | Baum–Walker Stadium; Fayetteville, AR | L 4–5 | Evan Taylor (3–0) | Riley Cooper (2–2) | Brady Tygart (1) | SECN+ | 10,270 | 23–10 | 7–6 |
| April 15 | at No. 6 Arkansas | No. 15 | Baum–Walker Stadium | L 0–4 | Hagen Smith (6–2) | Blake Money (2–3) | Evan Taylor (1) | SECN | 10,811 | 23–11 | 7–7 |
| April 16 | at No. 6 Arkansas | No. 15 | Baum–Walker Stadium | L 2–6 | Jaxon Wiggins (5–0) | Grant Taylor (4–1) | None | SECN+ | 11,049 | 23–12 | 7–8 |
| April 19 | Louisiana-Lafayette | No. 22 | Alex Box Stadium | W 8–4 | Ty Floyd (4–2) | Brandon Talley (2–2) | Eric Reyzelman (2) | SECN+ | 6,789 | 24–12 | |
| April 21 | Missouri | No. 22 | Alex Box Stadium | W 5–3 | Ma'Khail Hilliard (4–0) | Spencer Miles (2–4) | Paul Gervase (3) | ESPNU | 10,287 | 25–12 | 8–8 |
| April 22 | Missouri | No. 22 | Alex Box Stadium | W 4–3^{10} | Riley Cooper (3–2) | Austin Troesser (3–1) | None | SECN+ | 10,919 | 26–12 | 9–8 |
| April 23 | Missouri | No. 22 | Alex Box Stadium | W 8–6 | Bryce Collins (2–0) | Austin Marozas (1–2) | Riley Cooper (1) | SECN+ | 10,288 | 27–12 | 10–8 |
| April 26 | at New Orleans | No. 22 | Maestri Field at Privateer Park; New Orleans, LA | L 4–9 | Beau Blanchard (1–0) | Ty Floyd (4–3) | None | ESPN+ | 5,000 | 27–13 | |
| April 29 | No. 14 Georgia | No. 22 | Alex Box Stadium | W 6–2 | Ma'Khail Hilliard (5–0) | Nolan Crisp (1–2) | Paul Gervase (4) | SECN+ | 11,145 | 28–13 | 11–8 |
| April 30 | No. 14 Georgia | No. 22 | Alex Box Stadium | L 7–12 | Jonathan Cannon (8–1) | Bryce Collins (2–1) | Jack Gowen (9) | SECN+ | 11,067 | 28–14 | 11–9 |

May (9–4)
| Date | Opponent | Rank | Site/stadium | Score | Win | Loss | Save | TV | Attendance | Overall record | SEC record |
|---|---|---|---|---|---|---|---|---|---|---|---|
| May 1 | No. 14 Georgia | No. 22 | Alex Box Stadium | W 4–3 | Paul Gervase (2–1) | Jaden Woods (1–1) | None | SECN+ | 10,481 | 29–14 | 12–9 |
| May 3 | Nicholls | No. 20 | Alex Box Stadium | W 10–6 | Jacob Hasty (1–0) | Josh Mancuso (2–1) | None | SECN+ | 10,856 | 30–14 | |
| May 6 | at Alabama | No. 20 | Sewell–Thomas Stadium; Tuscaloosa, AL | W 6–5 | Riley Cooper (4–2) | Brock Guffey (2–3) | Paul Gervase (5) | SECN+ | 3,508 | 31–14 | 13–9 |
| May 7 | at Alabama | No. 20 | Sewell–Thomas Stadium | L 3–8 | Jacob McNairy (5–2) | Blake Money (2–4) | None | SECN | 3,843 | 31–15 | 13–10 |
| May 8 | at Alabama | No. 20 | Sewell–Thomas Stadium | W 12–3 | Jacob Hasty (2–0) | Grayson Hitt (4–3) | None | SECN+ | 3,326 | 32–15 | 14–10 |
| May 10 | Southeastern Louisiana | No. 17 | Alex Box Stadium | W 17–3^{7} | Samuel Dutton (1–1) | Andrew Yuratich (1–1) | None | SECN+ | 10,601 | 33–15 | |
| May 14 | Ole Miss | No. 17 | Alex Box Stadium | L 3–5 | Dylan DeLucia (5–0) | Ma'Khail Hilliard (5–1) | Brandon Johnson (8) | ESPN2 | 11,242 | 33–16 | 14–11 |
| May 14 | Ole Miss | No. 17 | Alex Box Stadium | L 1–11 | Hunter Elliott (3–3) | Devin Fontenot (2–2) | None | SECN | 11,124 | 33–17 | 14–12 |
| May 15 | Ole Miss | No. 17 | Alex Box Stadium | L 5–8 | John Gaddis (3–1) | Eric Reyzelman (1–2) | Brandon Johnson (9) | SECN+ | 10,671 | 33–18 | 14–13 |
| May 17 | Northwestern State | – | Alex Box Stadium | W 19–7^{7} | Paul Gervase (3–1) | Dawson Flowers (0–3) | None | SECN+ | 10,423 | 34–18 | |
| May 19 | at No. 21 Vanderbilt | – | Hawkins Field; Nashville, TN | W 13–2 | Ma'Khail Hilliard (6–1) | Devin Futrell (8–2) | Eric Reyzelman (1) | ESPN2 | 3,802 | 35–18 | 15–13 |
| May 20 | at No. 21 Vanderbilt | – | Hawkins Field | W 8–3 | Ty Floyd (5–3) | Christian Little (1–2) | None | SECN+ | 3,802 | 36–18 | 16–13 |
| May 21 | at No. 21 Vanderbilt | – | Hawkins Field | W 21–10 | Bryce Collins (3–1) | Thomas Schultz (4–2) | None | SECN | 3,802 | 37–18 | 17–13 |

Postseason (3–4)

SEC Tournament (1–2)
| Date | Opponent | Seed/Rank | Site/stadium | Score | Win | Loss | Save | TV | Attendance | Overall record | SECT Record |
|---|---|---|---|---|---|---|---|---|---|---|---|
| May 26 | vs. (12) Kentucky | No. 21 (4) | Hoover Metropolitan Stadium; Hoover, AL | W 11–6 | Ma'Khail Hilliard (7–1) | Mason Hazelwood (1–1) | None | SECN | 9,697 | 38–18 | 1–0 |
| May 27 | vs. No. 1 (1) Tennessee | No. 21 (4) | Hoover Metropolitan Stadium | L 2–5 | Chase Dollander (9–0) | Ty Floyd (5–4) | Redmond Walsh (7) | SECN | 12,215 | 38–19 | 1–1 |
| May 28 | vs. (12) Kentucky | No. 21 (4) | Hoover Metropolitan Stadium | L 2–7 | Tyler Bosma (4–3) | Jacob Hasty (2–1) | None | SECN | 7,102 | 38–20 | 1–2 |

NCAA tournament – Hattiesburg Regional (2–2)
| Date | Opponent | Seed/Rank | Site/stadium | Score | Win | Loss | Save | TV | Attendance | Overall record | NCAAT record |
|---|---|---|---|---|---|---|---|---|---|---|---|
| June 3 | vs. (3) Kennesaw State | (2) | Pete Taylor Park; Hattiesburg, MS | W 14–11 | Devin Fontenot (3–2) | Smith Pinson (6–6) | Paul Gervase (1) | ESPN+ | 5,039 | 39–20 | 1–0 |
| June 4 | at No. 15 (1) Southern Miss | (2) | Pete Taylor Park | W 7–6^{10} | Paul Gervase (4–1) | Garrett Ramsey (5–1) | None | ESPN+ | 5,211 | 40–20 | 2–0 |
| June 5 | at No. 15 (1) Southern Miss | (2) | Pete Taylor Park | L 4–8 | Justin Storm (3–0) | Riley Cooper (4–3) | None | ESPN+ | 5,179 | 40–21 | 2–1 |
| June 6 | at No. 15 (1) Southern Miss | (2) | Pete Taylor Park | L 7–8 | Tyler Stuart (4–0) | Eric Reyzelman (1–3) | None | ESPNU | 5,256 | 40–22 | 2–2 |

Schedule source:

*Rankings are based on the team's current ranking in the D1Baseball poll.

== Rankings ==
Ranking movements Legend: ██ Increase in ranking ██ Decrease in ranking — = Not ranked ( ) = First-place votes
| | Week | | | | | | | | | | | | | | | | |
| Poll | Pre | 1 | 2 | 3 | 4 | 5 | 6 | 7 | 8 | 9 | 10 | 11 | 12 | 13 | 14 | 15 | Final |
|---|---|---|---|---|---|---|---|---|---|---|---|---|---|---|---|---|---|
| Coaches' | 7 (1) | 7 (1)* | 7 | 9 | 8 | 18 | 12 | 16 | 12 | 23 | 20 | 19 | 15 | 24 | 20 | — | 22 |
| Baseball America | 10 | 11 | 8 | 16 | 16 | — | 21 | — | 24 | — | — | 20 | 14 | — | 21 | — | 24 |
| Collegiate Baseball^ | 3 | 2 | 3 | 6 | 4 | 14 | 17 | 23 | 17 | — | 27 | 23 | 19 | — | 16 | 19 | 23 |
| NCBWA† | 8 | 6 | 5 | 8 | 9 | 16 | 11 | 16 | 12 | 23 | 23 | 19 | 18 | 21 | 20 | 24 | 21 |
| D1Baseball | 8 | 8 | 7 | 12 | 13 | 21 | 13 | 19 | 15 | 22 | 22 | 20 | 17 | — | 21 | — | 25 |

^ Collegiate Baseball ranked 40 teams in their preseason poll, but only ranked 30 teams weekly during the season.
† NCBWA ranks 30 teams in their preseason poll, but only ranks 25 teams weekly during the season.
* A new poll was not released for this week, so for comparison purposes, the previous week's ranking is inserted in this week's slot.
