= 2022 South Carolina Gamecocks baseball team =

American college baseball season

2022 South Carolina Gamecocks baseball
- Conference: Southeastern Conference
- Eastern Division
- Record: 27–28 (13–17 SEC)
- Head coach: Mark Kingston (5th season)
- Assistant coaches: Chad Caillet (1st season); Scott Wingo (1st season)
- Pitching coach: Justin Parker (1st season)
- Home stadium: Founders Park

Uniform
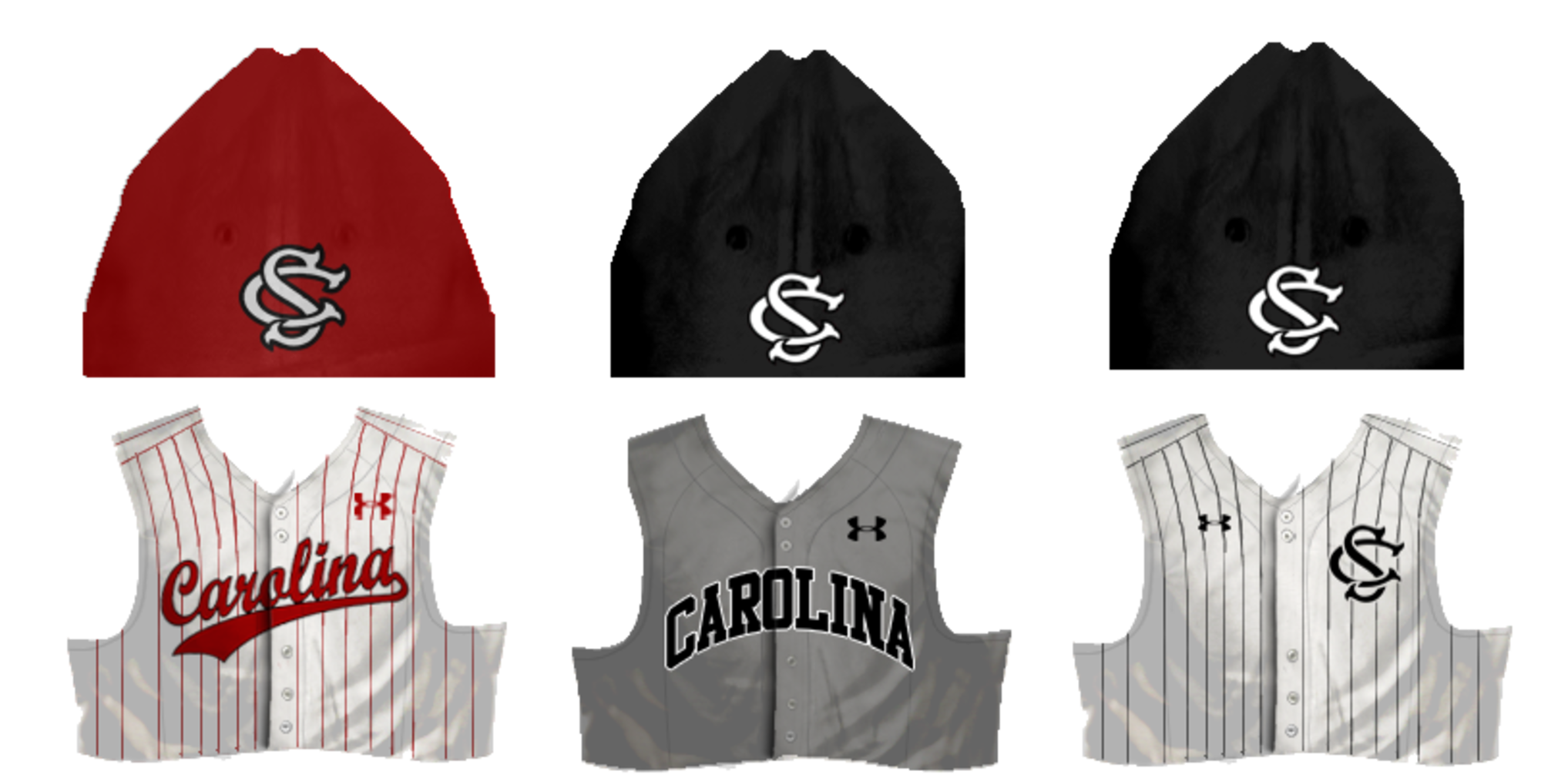

2022 Southeastern Conference baseball standings
	Conf.				Overall
Team	W		L	PCT	W		L	PCT
Eastern
No. 9 Tennessee ^{x}‍†‍‡‍^{y}	25	–	5	.833	57	–	9	.864
No. 21 Florida ‍‍‍^{y}	15	–	15	.500	42	–	24	.636
Georgia ‍‍‍^{y}	15	–	15	.500	36	–	23	.610
Vanderbilt ‍‍‍^{y}	14	–	16	.467	39	–	23	.629
South Carolina ‍‍‍	13	–	17	.433	27	–	28	.491
Kentucky ‍‍‍	12	–	18	.400	33	–	26	.559
Missouri ‍‍‍	10	–	20	.333	28	–	23	.549
Western
No. 3 Texas A&M ^{x}‍‍‍^{y}	19	–	11	.633	44	–	20	.688
No. 4 Arkansas ‍‍‍^{y}	18	–	12	.600	46	–	21	.687
No. 25 LSU ‍‍‍^{y}	17	–	13	.567	40	–	22	.645
No. 7 Auburn ‍‍‍^{y}	16	–	13	.552	43	–	22	.662
No. 1 Ole Miss ‍‍‍^{y}	14	–	16	.467	42	–	23	.646
Alabama ‍‍‍	12	–	17	.414	31	–	27	.534
Mississippi State ‍‍‍	9	–	21	.300	26	–	30	.464
x – Division champion † – Conference champion ‡ – Tournament champion y – Invited to the NCAA tournament Rankings from D1Baseball

The 2022 South Carolina Gamecocks baseball team represented the University of South Carolina in the 2022 NCAA Division I baseball season. The 2022 season marked the Gamecocks' 129th overall. The Gamecocks played their home games at Founders Park, and were led by fifth year head coach Mark Kingston.

== Previous season ==
The Gamecocks finished 34–23, 16–14 in the SEC, losing in the Columbia Regional to Virginia.

== Personnel ==
=== Roster ===
2022 South Carolina Gamecocks baseball team
Players
Coaches

#	Pos.	Name	B/T	Height	Weight	Year	Home town
2	INF	Jalen Vasquez	L/R	5 ft 11 in (1.8 m)	170 lb (77 kg)	So	North Charleston, SC
3	INF	Braylen Wimmer	R/R	6 ft 4 in (1.93 m)	200 lb (91 kg)	Jr	Yukon, OK
4	LHP	Jackson Phipps	L/L	6 ft 5 in (1.96 m)	230 lb (104 kg)	So	Dallas, GA
5	INF	Talmadge LeCroy	R/R	6 ft 2 in (1.88 m)	190 lb (86 kg)	Fr	Belton, SC
7	INF	Michael Braswell	R/R	6 ft 2 in (1.88 m)	180 lb (82 kg)	Fr	Mableton, GA
9	OF	Evan Stone	R/R	6 ft 0 in (1.83 m)	180 lb (82 kg)	Fr	Irmo, SC
10	C	Colin Burgess	R/R	5 ft 8 in (1.73 m)	195 lb (88 kg)	Jr	Lexington, KY
11	OF	Andrew Eyster	R/R	6 ft 3 in (1.91 m)	220 lb (100 kg)	Gr	Ocala, FL
12	INF	Josiah Sightler	L/L	6 ft 5 in (1.96 m)	234 lb (106 kg)	Sr	Gaston, SC
13	OF	Brandt Belk	L/R	6 ft 3 in (1.91 m)	180 lb (82 kg)	Gr	Houston, TX
14	RHP	Eli Jones	R/R	6 ft 1 in (1.85 m)	190 lb (86 kg)	Fr	Peachtree City, GA
15	INF	Carson Hornung	L/R	6 ft 3 in (1.91 m)	210 lb (95 kg)	Fr	Overland Park, KS
16	LHP	John Gilreath	L/L	5 ft 11 in (1.8 m)	179 lb (81 kg)	Sr	Rock Hill, SC
18	LHP	Julian Bosnic	L/L	6 ft 3 in (1.91 m)	218 lb (99 kg)	Jr	Lutz, FL
19	C	Cole Messina	R/R	6 ft 0 in (1.83 m)	215 lb (98 kg)	Fr	Summerville, SC
20	OF	Matt Hogan	L/R	6 ft 0 in (1.83 m)	195 lb (88 kg)	Sr	Melville, NY
21	RHP	Connor Cino	L/R	6 ft 1 in (1.85 m)	206 lb (93 kg)	So	Mount Pleasant, SC
22	OF	Elijah Lambros	R/R	6 ft 2 in (1.88 m)	195 lb (88 kg)	Fr	Fredericksburg, VA
23	RHP	Jack Mahoney	R/R	6 ft 2 in (1.88 m)	210 lb (95 kg)	Fr	Arlington Heights, IL
24	LHP	Michael Esposito	L/L	6 ft 3 in (1.91 m)	219 lb (99 kg)	Jr	Port Washington, NY
25	C	Sam Simpson	R/R	6 ft 1 in (1.85 m)	175 lb (79 kg)	Fr	Carrollton, GA
26	OF	Thad Ector	S/R	6 ft 1 in (1.85 m)	185 lb (84 kg)	Fr	Tyrone, GA
28	INF	Vytas Valincius	R/R	6 ft 4 in (1.93 m)	230 lb (104 kg)	Fr	Lockport, IL
29	LHP	Matthew Becker	R/L	6 ft 3 in (1.91 m)	185 lb (84 kg)	Fr	Chapin, SC
30	RHP	Brett Thomas	R/R	6 ft 5 in (1.96 m)	245 lb (111 kg)	Jr	Atlanta, GA
31	OF	David Cromer	R/R	6 ft 2 in (1.88 m)	232 lb (105 kg)	Fr	Lexington, SC
32	RHP	Will Sanders	R/R	6 ft 6 in (1.98 m)	208 lb (94 kg)	So	Atlanta, GA
33	RHP	Noah Hall	R/R	6 ft 0 in (1.83 m)	190 lb (86 kg)	Jr	Charlotte, NC
34	RHP	James Hicks	R/R	6 ft 2 in (1.88 m)	190 lb (86 kg)	Jr	Conway, AR
36	RHP	Cade Austin	R/R	6 ft 3 in (1.91 m)	220 lb (100 kg)	Fr	Chapin, SC
37	RHP	Cam Tringali	R/R	6 ft 4 in (1.93 m)	228 lb (103 kg)	Gr	Columbia, SC
38	RHP	Aiden Hunter	R/R	6 ft 4 in (1.93 m)	195 lb (88 kg)	Fr	Summerville, SC
40	RHP	Wesley Sweatt	R/R	6 ft 3 in (1.91 m)	225 lb (102 kg)	Sr	Rock Hill, SC
44	RHP	Parker Coyne	R/R	6 ft 2 in (1.88 m)	210 lb (95 kg)	Gr	Suwanee, GA
45	RHP	CJ Weins	R/R	6 ft 3 in (1.91 m)	223 lb (101 kg)	Sr	Lockport, IL
50	INF	Kevin Madden	R/R	6 ft 1 in (1.85 m)	215 lb (98 kg)	Sr	Glenwood, MD

Head coach

Mark Kingston

Assistant coach(es)

Scott Wingo
Chad Caillet
Justin Parker

Legend

- (C) Team captain
- (S) Suspended
- (I) Ineligible
- Injured
- Current redshirt

Roster

=== Coaching staff ===
2021 South Carolina Gamecocks baseball coaching staff
- Mark Kingston - Head coach - 5th year
- Scott Wingo - Assistant coach - 1st year
- Chad Caillet - Assistant coach - 1st year
- Justin Parker - Pitching coach - 1st year
- Mike Current - Player Development - 5th year

== Schedule and results ==
2022 South Carolina Gamecocks baseball game log (27–28)
Regular season (27–27)

February (6-1)
Date	Opponent	Rank	Site/stadium	Score	Win	Loss	Save	TV	Attendance	Overall record	SEC record
February 18	UNC Greensboro		Founders Park; Columbia, SC	9-7	**Sanders (1-0)**	Koehn (0-1)	**Sweatt (1)**	SECN+	7,427	1–0	
February 19	UNC Greensboro		Founders Park	4-5	Hoppe (1-0)	**Hicks (0-1)**	Parsley (1)	SECN+	6,814	1–1	
February 20	UNC Greensboro		Founders Park	8-7 (10)	**Braswell (1-0)**	Freeman (0-1)	None	SECN+	6,208	2–1	
February 22	Winthrop		Founders Park	7-1	**Austin (1-0)**	Sutton (0-1)	None	SECN+	6,230	3–1	
February 25	George Washington		Founders Park	13-4	**Sanders (2-0)**	Cohen (0-2)	None	SECN+	6,730	4–1	
February 26	George Washington		Founders Park	10-6	**Sweatt (1-0)**	Harris (0-2)	**Braswell (1)**	SECN+	6,345	5–1	
February 27	George Washington		Founders Park	5-0	**Hunter (1-0)**	Solt (0-2)	None	SECN+	6,412	6–1	

March (6-11)
Date	Opponent	Rank	Site/stadium	Score	Win	Loss	Save	TV	Attendance	Overall record	SEC record
March 1	vs. Appalachian State		Truist Field; Charlotte, NC	9-6	Hunter (2-0)	Ellington (0-1)	**Braswell (2)**	SECN+	2,345	7–1	
March 4	Clemson		Founders Park	2-3	Edmondson (2-0)	**Gilreath (0-1)**	Ammons (3)	SECN+	8,242	7–2	
March 5	vs. Clemson		Segra Park; Columbia, SC	2-10	Hoffmann (2-0)	**Hall (0-1)**	None	ACCN Extra	9,070	7–3	
March 6	at Clemson		Doug Kingsmore Stadium; Clemson, SC	2-5	Lindley (2-0)	**Hunter (2-1)**	Ammons (4)	ACCN	6,636	7–4	
March 8	Xavier		Founders Park	7-15	Lynch (1-0)	**Hunter (2-2)**	None	SECN+	5,623	7–5	
March 11	Texas		Founders Park	5-9	Hansen (3-0)	**Hall (0-2)**	None	SECN	6,754	7–6	
March 12	Texas		Founders Park	4-2 (7)	**Sanders (3-0)**	Stevens (3-1)	**Braswell (3)**	SECN+	6,572	8–6	
March 13	Texas		Founders Park	9-4	**Becker (1-0)**	Gordon (0-1)	None	SECN+	6,010	9–6	
March 15	Gardner–Webb		Founders Park	12-0 (7)	**Hunter (3-2)**	E'Toile (0-1)	None	SECN+	6,112	10–6	
March 18	at Tennessee		Lindsey Nelson Stadium; Knoxville, TN	3-8	Burns (4-0)	**Hall (0-3)**	None	SECN+	3,940	10–7	0–1
March 19	at Tennessee		Lindsey Nelson Stadium	2-5	Dollander (3-0)	**Sanders (3-1)**	Walsh (2)	SECN	3,987	10–8	0–2
March 20	at Tennessee		Lindsey Nelson Stadium	0-10	Beam (4-0)	**Becker (1-1)**	None	SECN+	4,283	10–9	0–3
March 22	at The Citadel		Joseph P. Riley Jr. Park; Charleston, SC	3-4	Dunn (1-0)	**Braswell (1-1)**	None	ESPN+	3,533	10–10	
March 24	Vanderbilt		Founders Park	0-10	McElvain (4-0)	**Hall (0-4)**	None	ESPN2	6,608	10–11	0–4
March 25	Vanderbilt		Founders Park	8-2	**Sanders (4-1)**	Holton (4-1)	None	SECN+	7,647	11–11	1–4
March 26	Vanderbilt		Founders Park	8-6	**Hunter (4-2)**	Owen (2-1)	**Austin (1)**	SECN+	8,032	12–11	2–4
March 29	Presbyterian		Founders Park	6-9	Dearman (1-0)	**Esposito (0-1)**	None	SECN+	6,012	12–12	

April (10–8)
Date	Opponent	Rank	Site/stadium	Score	Win	Loss	Save	TV	Attendance	Overall record	SEC record
April 1	at Missouri		Taylor Stadium; Columbia, MO	4–1	**Hall (1–4)**	Miles (2–2)	**Austin (2)**	SECN+	831	13–12	3–4
April 2	at Missouri		Taylor Stadium	7–8	Landry (2–2)	**Braswell (1–2)**	None	SECN+	1,237	13–13	3–5
April 3	at Missouri		Taylor Stadium	3–10	Marozas (1–0)	**Becker (1–2)**	Rustad (1)	SECN+	1,064	13–14	3–6
April 6	vs. No. 22 North Carolina		Truist Field	15–2	**Hunter (5–2)**	Gillian (1–2)	None	ACCNX	3,456	14–14	
April 8	No. 14 Georgia		Founders Park	2–3	Pearson (2–1)	**Austin (1–1)**	Gowen (1)	SECN+	6,684	14–15	3–7
April 9	No. 14 Georgia		Founders Park	13–7	**Sanders (5–1)**	Brown (0–1)	**Becker (1)**	SECN+	7,124	15–15	4–7
April 10	No. 14 Georgia		Founders Park	9–13	Sullivan (3–1)	**Hunter (5–3)**	Gowen (1)	SECN	6,024	15–16	4–8
April 12	North Florida		Founders Park	4–2	**Tringali (1–0)**	Boroski (0–1)	**Becker (1)**	SECN+	5,918	16–16	
April 14	No. 25 Ole Miss		Founders Park	1–9	DeLucia (2–0)	**Hunter (5–4)**	None	SECN+	6,239	16–17	4–9
April 15	No. 25 Ole Miss		Founders Park	4–2	**Hall (2–4)**	Diamond (3–3)	**Becker (3)**	SECN+	7,027	17–17	5–9
April 16	No. 25 Ole Miss		Founders Park	9–8	**Austin (2–1)**	McDaniel (3–1)	None	SECN+	7,162	18–17	6–9
April 20	at Winthrop		Winthrop Ballpark; Rock Hill, SC	5–2	**Austin (3–1)**	Butcher (0–2)	**Becker (1)**	ESPN+	1,210	19–17	
April 22	at No. 19 Auburn		Plainsman Park; Auburn, AL	3–6	Skipper (4–0)	**Gilreath (1–3)**	Burkhalter (9)	SECN+	3,698	19–18	6–10
April 23	at No. 19 Auburn		Plainsman Park	6–8	Swilling (1–2)	**Becker (1–3)**	Burkhalter (10)	SECN+	4,096	19–19	6–11
April 24	at No. 19 Auburn		Plainsman Park	0–2	Gonzalez (6–0)	**Sanders (5–2)**	Burkhalter (11)	SECN+	3,501	19–20	6–12
April 28	Alabama		Founders Park	6–5	**Austin (4–1)**	Guffey (2–2)	None	SECN	6,124	20–20	7–12
April 29	Alabama		Founders Park	2–1	**Becker (2–3)**	Ray (1–3)	None	SECN+	6,635	21–20	8–12
April 30	Alabama		Founders Park	11–5	**Sanders (6–2)**	Hitt (4–2)	None	SECN	6,564	22–20	9–12

May (5–7)
Date	Opponent	Rank	Site/stadium	Score	Win	Loss	Save	TV	Attendance	Overall record	SEC record
May 4	North Carolina A&T		Founders Park	9–4	**Jones (1–0)**	Hull (0–2)	None	SECN	5,944	23–20	
May 6	at No. 13 Texas A&M		Blue Bell Park; College Station, TX	4–16	Menefee (3–2)	**Thomas (0–1)**	None	SECN+	6,003	23–21	9–13
May 7	at No. 13 Texas A&M		Blue Bell Park	12–13	Palisch (4–3)	**Becker (2–4)**	None	SECN+	5,806	23–22	9–14
May 8	at No. 13 Texas A&M		Blue Bell Park	9–4	**Sanders (7–2)**	Prager (1–2)	None	SECN+	5,037	24–22	10–14
May 10	USC Upstate		Founders Park	6–9	Holguin (4–0)	**Jones (1–1)**	Morgan (1)		5,905	24–23	
May 13	Kentucky		Founders Park	11–3	**Thomas (1–1)**	Strickland (2–3)	None	SECN+	6,139	25–23	11–14
May 14	Kentucky		Founders Park	7–0	**Hall (3–4)**	Harney (5–4)	None	SECN	6,065	26–23	12–14
May 15	Kentucky		Founders Park	1–7	Hazelwood (2–2)	**Sanders (7–3)**	None	SECN+	5,846	26–24	12–15
May 17	Charlotte		Founders Park	3–8	Rossi (5–0)	**Hunter (5–5)**	None	SECN+	6,034	26–25	
May 19	at Florida		Condron Ballpark; Gainesville, FL	5–14	Sproat (8–4)	**Gilreath (0–3)**	None	SECN+	4,327	26–26	12–16
May 20	at Florida		Condron Ballpark	0–8	Neely (3–1)	**Hall (3–5)**	None	SECN+	4,992	26–27	12–17
May 21	at Florida		Condron Ballpark	4–1	**Austin (5–1)**	Pogue (3–3)	**Gilreath (1)**	SECN+	4,811	27–27	13–17

Postseason (0–1)

SEC Tournament (0–1)
Date	Opponent	Seed	Site/stadium	Score	Win	Loss	Save	TV	Attendance	Overall record	SECT Record
May 24	vs. (7) Florida	(10)	Hoover Metropolitan Stadium; Hoover, AL	1–2^{10}	Slater (5–3)	**Austin (5–2)**	None	SECN	5,506	27–28	0–1

Legend: = Win = Loss = Canceled
Bold = South Carolina team member
Rankings are based on the team's current ranking in the D1Baseball poll.

== Rankings ==
Ranking movements Legend: — = Not ranked
	Week																		
Poll	Pre	1	2	3	4	5	6	7	8	9	10	11	12	13	14	15	16	17	Final
Coaches'	—	—*																	
Baseball America	—																		
Collegiate Baseball^	—																		
NCBWA†	—																		
D1Baseball	—																		

^ Collegiate Baseball ranked 40 teams in their preseason poll, but only ranked 30 teams weekly during the season.
† NCBWA ranks 30 teams in their preseason poll, but only ranks 25 teams weekly during the season.
* A new poll was not released for this week, so for comparison purposes, the previous week's ranking is inserted in this week's slot.

== See also ==
- 2022 South Carolina Gamecocks softball team
