= 2022 Tennessee Volunteers baseball team =

College Baseball Season

2022 Tennessee Volunteers baseball

SEC Eastern Division champion SEC regular season champions SEC tournament champions NCAA Knoxville Regional champion

Knoxville Super Regional, 1–2
- Conference: Southeastern Conference
- Eastern Division

Ranking
- Coaches: No. 9
- CB: No. 9
- Record: 57–9 (25–5 SEC)
- Head coach: Tony Vitello (5th season)
- Assistant coaches: Frank Anderson; Josh Elander
- Home stadium: Lindsey Nelson Stadium

Uniform
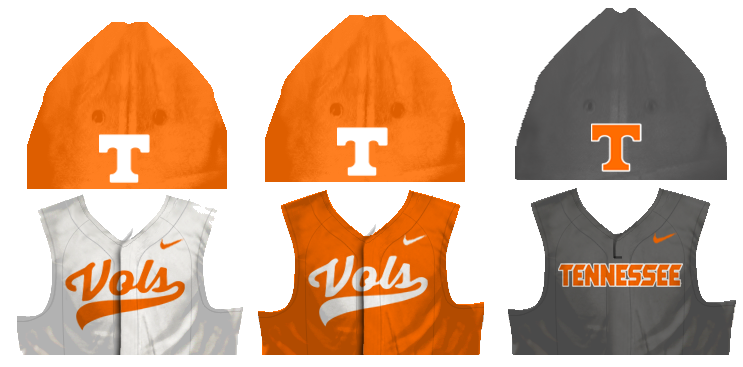

2022 Southeastern Conference baseball standings
	Conf.				Overall
Team	W		L	PCT	W		L	PCT
Eastern
No. 9 Tennessee ^{x}‍†‍‡‍^{y}	25	–	5	.833	57	–	9	.864
No. 21 Florida ‍‍‍^{y}	15	–	15	.500	42	–	24	.636
Georgia ‍‍‍^{y}	15	–	15	.500	36	–	23	.610
Vanderbilt ‍‍‍^{y}	14	–	16	.467	39	–	23	.629
South Carolina ‍‍‍	13	–	17	.433	27	–	28	.491
Kentucky ‍‍‍	12	–	18	.400	33	–	26	.559
Missouri ‍‍‍	10	–	20	.333	28	–	23	.549
Western
No. 3 Texas A&M ^{x}‍‍‍^{y}	19	–	11	.633	44	–	20	.688
No. 4 Arkansas ‍‍‍^{y}	18	–	12	.600	46	–	21	.687
No. 25 LSU ‍‍‍^{y}	17	–	13	.567	40	–	22	.645
No. 7 Auburn ‍‍‍^{y}	16	–	13	.552	43	–	22	.662
No. 1 Ole Miss ‍‍‍^{y}	14	–	16	.467	42	–	23	.646
Alabama ‍‍‍	12	–	17	.414	31	–	27	.534
Mississippi State ‍‍‍	9	–	21	.300	26	–	30	.464
x – Division champion † – Conference champion ‡ – Tournament champion y – Invited to the NCAA tournament Rankings from D1Baseball

The 2022 Tennessee Volunteers baseball team represented the University of Tennessee in the 2022 NCAA Division I baseball season. The Volunteers played their home games at Lindsey Nelson Stadium.

== Previous season ==
The Volunteers finished 50–18, 20–10 in the SEC to finish in first place in the East division. They hosted the 2021 Knoxville Regional and finished 3–0. The Vols then hosted LSU in the Knoxville Super Regional, winning the first two games to advance to their first College World Series since 2005. The Vols lost both of their games in Omaha to Virginia and Texas.

== Schedule and results ==
2022 Tennessee Volunteers baseball game log
Regular season (49–7)

February
Date	Opponent	Rank	Site/stadium	Score	Win	Loss	Save	TV	Attendance	Overall record	SEC record
February 18	Georgia Southern	No. 19	Lindsey Nelson Stadium; Knoxville, TN	**W** 9–0	Chase Burns	Ty Fisher	N/A	SEC Network +	4,335	1–0	0–0
February 19	Georgia Southern	No. 19	Lindsey Nelson Stadium	**W** 10–3	Ethan Smith	Thomas Higgins	N/A	SEC Network +	4,651	2–0	0–0
February 20	Georgia Southern	No. 19	Lindsey Nelson Stadium	**W** 14–0	Camden Sewell	Ben Johnson	N/A	SEC Network +	4,580	3–0	0–0
February 23	UNC Asheville	No. 18	Lindsey Nelson Stadium	**W** 16–1	Zander Sechrist	Justin Honeycutt	N/A	WatchESPN.com	3,543	4-0	0-0
February 25	Iona	No. 18	Lindsey Nelson Stadium	**W** 27–1	Chase Burns	Paul Sullivan	N/A	SEC Network +	3,783	5–0	0-0
February 26	Iona	No. 18	Lindsey Nelson Stadium	**W** 29–0	Chase Dollander	Blake Helmstetter	N/A	SEC Network +	3,853	6–0	0–0
February 27	Iona	No. 18	Lindsey Nelson Stadium	**W** 12–2 (7 inn)	Drew Beam	Nick Chiaia	N/A	SEC Network +	3,526	7–0	0–0

March
Date	Opponent	Rank	Site/stadium	Score	Win	Loss	Save	TV	Attendance	Overall record	SEC record
March 1	East Tennessee State	No. 17	Lindsey Nelson Stadium	**W** 4–1	**Camden Sewell**	Landon Smiddy	**Redmond Walsh**	WatchESPN.com	4,391	8–0	0–0
Shriners Children's College Classic
March 4	vs. No. 1 Texas	No. 17	Minute Maid Park; Houston, TX	**L** 7–2	Pete Hansen	**Camden Sewell**	N/A	MLB Network	16,515	8–1	0–0
March 5	vs. Baylor	No. 17	Minute Maid Park	**W** 10–5	**Kirby Connell**	Jake Jackson	N/A	MLB Network	24,787	9–1	0–0
March 6	vs. Oklahoma	No. 17	Minute Maid Park	**W** 8–0	**Drew Beam**	Chazz Martinez	N/A	MLB Network	12,577	10–1	0–0
March 8	James Madison	No. 10	Lindsey Nelson Stadium	**W** 9–8 (10 inn)	**Redmond Walsh**	Lliam Grubbs	N/A	WatchESPN.com	3,502	11–1	0–0
March 9	James Madison	No. 10	Lindsey Nelson Stadium	**W** 10–2	**Will Mabrey**	Sean Culkin	N/A	WatchESPN.com	3,524	12–1	0–0
March 11 (DH 1)	Rhode Island	No. 10	Lindsey Nelson Stadium	**W** 17–4	**Chase Burns**	Ryan Twitchell	N/A	SEC Network +	3,860	13–1	0–0
March 11 (DH 2)	Rhode Island	No. 10	Lindsey Nelson Stadium	**W** 8–3	**Chase Dollander**	Domenic Picone	N/A	SEC Network +	3,860	14–1	0–0
March 13	Rhode Island	No. 10	Lindsey Nelson Stadium	**W** 12–3	**Drew Beam**	Trystan Levesque	N/A	SEC Network +	3,607	15–1	0–0
March 15	Eastern Kentucky	No. 7	Lindsey Nelson Stadium	**W** 7–1	**Zander Sechrist**	Isaac Milburn	N/A	WatchESPN.com	3,925	16–1	0–0
March 18	South Carolina	No. 7	Lindsey Nelson Stadium	**W** 8–3	**Chase Burns**	Noah Hall	N/A	SEC Network +	3,940	17–1	1–0
March 19	South Carolina	No. 7	Lindsey Nelson Stadium	**W** 5–2	**Chase Dollander**	Will Sanders	**Redmond Walsh**	SEC Network	3,987	18–1	2–0
March 20	South Carolina	No. 7	Lindsey Nelson Stadium	**W** 10–0	**Drew Beam**	Matthew Becker	N/A	SEC Network +	4,233	19–1	3–0
March 22	Butler	No. 5	Lindsey Nelson Stadium	**W** 13–3	**Camden Sewell**	Luke Zmolik	N/A	WatchESPN.com	4,494	20–1	3–0
March 25	at No. 1 Ole Miss	No. 5	Swayze Field; Oxford, MS	**W** 12–1	**Chase Burns**	John Gaddis	N/A	SEC Network +	11,337	21–1	4–0
March 26	at No. 1 Ole Miss	No. 5	Swayze Field	**W** 10–3	**Chase Dollander**	Jack Dougherty	N/A	SEC Network	12,134	22–1	5–0
March 27	at No. 1 Ole Miss	No. 5	Swayze Field	**W** 4–3	**Drew Beam**	Derek Diamond	**Redmond Walsh**	SEC Network +	9,967	23–1	6–0
March 30	Western Carolina	No. 1	Lindsey Nelson Stadium	**W** 11–1	**Will Mabrey**	Zebby Matthews	N/A	SEC Network +	4,607	24–1	6–0

April
Date	Opponent	Rank	Site/stadium	Score	Win	Loss	Save	TV	Attendance	Overall record	SEC record
April 1	at No. 9 Vanderbilt	No. 1	Hawkins Field; Nashville, TN	**W** 6–2	**Chase Burns**	Chris McElvain	N/A	ESPN2	3,802	25–1	7–0
April 2	at No. 9 Vanderbilt	No. 1	Hawkins Field	**W** 5–2	**Chase Dollander**	Carter Holton	**Redmond Walsh**	SEC Network	3,802	26–1	8–0
April 3	at No. 9 Vanderbilt	No. 1	Hawkins Field	**W** 5–0	**Drew Beam**	Patrick Reilly	N/A	SEC Network +	3,802	27–1	9–0
April 5	Lipscomb	No. 1	Lindsey Nelson Stadium	**W** 5–1	**Ben Joyce**	Kaleb Kantoya	**Mark McLaughlin**	WatchESPN.com	3,953	28–1	9–0
April 8	Missouri	No. 1	Lindsey Nelson Stadium	**W** 8–3	**Mark McLaughlin**	Carter Rustad	N/A	SEC Network +	4,031	29–1	10–0
April 9	Missouri	No. 1	Lindsey Nelson Stadium	**W** 11–4	**Chase Dollander**	Austin Cheeley	N/A	SEC Network	4,249	30–1	11–0
April 10	Missouri	No. 1	Lindsey Nelson Stadium	**W** 4–3	**Drew Beam**	Austin Marozas	**Redmond Walsh**	SEC Network +	4,327	31–1	12–0
April 12	vs. Tennessee Tech (Wood Bat game)	No. 1	Smokies Stadium; Kodak, TN	**L** 3–2	Carter Gannaway	**Ben Joyce**	N/A	WatchESPN.com	8,183	31–2	12–0
April 15	No. 24 Alabama	No. 1	Lindsey Nelson Stadium	**L** 6–3	Garrett McMillan	**Chase Burns**	Dylan Ray	SEC Network +	4,597	31–3	12–1
April 16	No. 24 Alabama	No. 1	Lindsey Nelson Stadium	**W** 9–2	**Camden Sewell**	Jacob McNairy	N/A	SEC Network +	4,383	32–3	13–1
April 17	No. 24 Alabama	No. 1	Lindsey Nelson Stadium	**W** 15–4	**Drew Beam**	Grayson Hitt	N/A	SEC Network +	4,211	33–3	14–1
April 19	Bellarmine	No. 1	Lindsey Nelson Stadium	**W** 9–3	**Zander Schrist**	Matt Craven	N/A	SEC Network +	4,067	34–3	14–1
April 22	at Florida	No. 1	Condron Ballpark; Gainesville, FL	**W** 8–2	**Chase Burns**	Ryan Slater	N/A	SEC Network +	5,575	35–3	15–1
April 23	at Florida	No. 1	Condron Ballpark	**W** 3–0	**Blade Tidwell**	Brandon Sproct	**Camden Sewell**	SEC Network +	6,787	36–3	16–1
April 24	at Florida	No. 1	Condron Ballpark	**W** 6–4 (11 inn)	**Redmond Walsh**	Tyler Nesbitt	N/A	SEC Network+	5,470	37–3	17–1
April 26	Xavier	No. 1	Lindsey Nelson Stadium	**W** 10–1	**Zander Sechrist**	Conner Bailey	N/A	SEC Network +	4,385	38–3	17–1
April 29	Auburn	No. 1	Lindsey Nelson Stadium	**W** 17–4	**Mark McLaughlin**	Carson Skipper	N/A	SEC Network +	4,584	39–3	18–1
April 30	Auburn	No. 1	Lindsey Nelson Stadium	**L** 6–8	Konner Copeland	**Redmond Walsh**	N/A	SEC Network +	4,635	39–4	18–2

May
Date	Opponent	Rank	Site/stadium	Score	Win	Loss	Save	TV	Attendance	Overall record	SEC record
May 1	Auburn	No. 1	Lindsey Nelson Stadium	**W** 5–3	**Ben Joyce**	Joseph Gonzalez	N/A	SEC Network +	4,462	40–4	19–2
May 3	Alabama A&M	No. 1	Lindsey Nelson Stadium	**W** 14–1	**Gavin Brasosky**	Tyler Campbell	N/A	SEC Network+	4,329	41–4	19–2
May 5	at Kentucky	No. 1	Kentucky Proud Park; Lexington, KY	**L** 2–3	Tyler Guilfoil	**Mark McLaughlin**	N/A	SEC NETWORK+	2,394	41–5	19–3
May 6	at Kentucky	No. 1	Kentucky Proud Park	**L** 2–5	Zach Lee	**Blade Tidwell**	N/A	SEC Network +	2,661	41–6	19–4
May 7	at Kentucky	No. 1	Kentucky Proud Park	**W** 7–2 (7 inn)	**Redmond Walsh**	Wyatt Hudepohl	N/A	SEC Network +	3,209	42–6	20–4
May 10	Bellarmine	No. 1	Lindsey Nelson Stadium	**W** 11–5	**Kirby Connell**	Devin Ecklar	N/A	SEC Network +	4,269	43–6	20–4
May 12	Georgia	No. 1	Lindsey Nelson Stadium	**W** 5–2	**Chase Dollander**	Nolan Crisp	**Redmond Walsh**	ESPNU	4,580	44–6	21–4
May 13	Georgia	No. 1	Lindsey Nelson Stadium	**W** 9–2	**Camden Sewell**	Jonathan Cannon	N/A	SEC Network +	4,420	45–6	22–4
May 14	Georgia	No. 1	Lindsey Nelson Stadium	**L** 3–8	Jack Gowen	**Drew Beam**	N/A	SEC Network +	4,536	45–7	22–5
May 17	Belmont	No. 1	Lindsey Nelson Stadium	**W** 18–0	**J.D. McCracken**	Jordan Zuger	N/A	SEC Network +	4,599	46–7	22–5
May 19	at Mississippi State	No. 1	Dudy Noble Field; Starkville, MS	**W** 27–2	**Chase Dollander**	Brandon Smith	N/A	SEC Network	10,206	47–7	23–5
May 20	at Mississippi State	No. 1	Dudy Noble Field	**W** 4–3	**Blade Tidwell**	Preston Johnson	N/A	SEC Network +	10,592	48–7	24–5
May 21	at Mississippi State	No. 1	Dudy Noble Field	**W** 10–5	**Kirby Connell**	Cade Smith	N/A	SEC Network +	10,774	49–7	25–5

Postseason (7–0)

SEC Tournament
Date	Opponent	Seed	Site/stadium	Score	Win	Loss	Save	TV	Attendance	Overall record	SECT Record
May 26	(8) Vanderbilt; Second Round	No. 1 (1)	Hoover Metropolitan Stadium; Hoover, AL	**W** 10–1	**Camden Sewell**	Devin Futrell	N/A	SEC Network +	12,215	50–7	1–0
May 27	(4) LSU; Third round	No. 1 (1)	Hoover Metropolitan Stadium	**W** 5–2	**Chase Dollander**	Ty Floyd	**Redmond Walsh**	SEC Network+	12,215	51–7	2–0
May 28	(12) Kentucky; Semifinal	No. 1 (1)	Hoover Metropolitan Stadium	**W** 12–2	**Chase Burns**	Austin Strickland	N/A	SEC Network+	8,924	52–7	3–0
May 29	(7) Florida; Final	No. 1 (1)	Hoover Metropolitan Stadium	**W** 8–5	**Camden Sewell**	Carsten Finnvold	N/A	ESPN2	13,270	53–7	4–0

NCAA Knoxville Regional
Date	Time (ET)	Opponent	Seed	Site/stadium	Score	Win	Loss	Save	TV	Attendance	Overall record	NCAAT record	Sources
June 3	6:00 p.m.	(4) Alabama State; Regional First round	No. 1 (1)	Lindsey Nelson Stadium	**W** 10–0						54–7	1–0	
June 4	7:00 p.m.	(3) Campbell; Regional semifinal	No. 1 (1)	Lindsey Nelson Stadium	**W** 12–7						55–7	2–0	
June 5	7:00 p.m.	(2) Georgia Tech; Regional final – Game 1	No. 1 (1)	Lindsey Nelson Stadium	**W** 9–6						56–7	3–0	

NCAA Knoxville Super Regional
Date	Time (ET)	Opponent	Seed	Site/stadium	Score	Win	Loss	Save	TV	Attendance	Overall record	NCAAT record	Sources
June 10	6:00 p.m.	No. 17 Notre Dame; Super Regional – Game 1	No. 1 (1)	Lindsey Nelson Stadium	**L** 6–8						56–8	3–1	
June 11	2:00 p.m.	No. 17 Notre Dame; Super Regional – Game 2	No. 1 (1)	Lindsey Nelson Stadium	**W** 12–4						57–8	4–1	
June 12	1:00 p.m.	No. 17 Notre Dame; Super Regional – Game 3	No. 1 (1)	Lindsey Nelson Stadium	**L** 3–7						57–9	4–2	

Legend: = Win = Loss = Canceled
Bold = Tennessee team member
Rankings are based on the team's current ranking in the D1Baseball poll.

== Rankings ==
Ranking movements Legend: ██ Increase in ranking ██ Decrease in ranking
	Week																
Poll	Pre	1	2	3	4	5	6	7	8	9	10	11	12	13	14	15	Final
Coaches'	16	16*	11	4	5	5	1	1	1	1	1	1	1	1	1	1	9
Baseball America	17	17	16	11	9	7	1	1	1	1	1	1	2	1	1	1	8
Collegiate Baseball^	34	18	6	3	2	2	1	1	1	1	1	1	2	1	1	1	9
NCBWA†	16	15	14	9	7	3	1	1	1	1	1	1	2	1	1	1	9
D1Baseball	19	18	17	10	7	5	1	1	1	1	1	1	1	1	1	1	9

^ Collegiate Baseball ranked 40 teams in their preseason poll, but only ranked 30 teams weekly during the season.
† NCBWA ranks 30 teams in their preseason poll, but only ranks 25 teams weekly during the season.
* A new poll was not released for this week, so for comparison purposes, the previous week's ranking is inserted in this week's slot.
