= 2022 Mississippi State Bulldogs baseball team =

American college baseball season

2022 Mississippi State Bulldogs baseball
- Conference: Southeastern Conference
- Western Division
- Record: 26–30 (9–21 SEC)
- Head coach: Chris Lemonis (4th season)
- Assistant coaches: Scott Foxhall; Jake Gautreau
- Home stadium: Dudy Noble Field

2022 Southeastern Conference baseball standings
	Conf.				Overall
Team	W		L	PCT	W		L	PCT
Eastern
No. 9 Tennessee ^{x}‍†‍‡‍^{y}	25	–	5	.833	57	–	9	.864
No. 21 Florida ‍‍‍^{y}	15	–	15	.500	42	–	24	.636
Georgia ‍‍‍^{y}	15	–	15	.500	36	–	23	.610
Vanderbilt ‍‍‍^{y}	14	–	16	.467	39	–	23	.629
South Carolina ‍‍‍	13	–	17	.433	27	–	28	.491
Kentucky ‍‍‍	12	–	18	.400	33	–	26	.559
Missouri ‍‍‍	10	–	20	.333	28	–	23	.549
Western
No. 3 Texas A&M ^{x}‍‍‍^{y}	19	–	11	.633	44	–	20	.688
No. 4 Arkansas ‍‍‍^{y}	18	–	12	.600	46	–	21	.687
No. 25 LSU ‍‍‍^{y}	17	–	13	.567	40	–	22	.645
No. 7 Auburn ‍‍‍^{y}	16	–	13	.552	43	–	22	.662
No. 1 Ole Miss ‍‍‍^{y}	14	–	16	.467	42	–	23	.646
Alabama ‍‍‍	12	–	17	.414	31	–	27	.534
Mississippi State ‍‍‍	9	–	21	.300	26	–	30	.464
x – Division champion † – Conference champion ‡ – Tournament champion y – Invited to the NCAA tournament Rankings from D1Baseball

The 2022 Mississippi State Bulldogs baseball team represented Mississippi State University in the 2022 NCAA Division I baseball season. The Bulldogs played their home games at Dudy Noble Field. They entered this season as the defending national champions.

== Previous season ==
The Bulldogs finished 50–18, 20–10 in the SEC to finish in second place in the West. The Bulldogs swept the Starkville Regional and then hosted Notre Dame in the Starkville Super Regional. They advanced to the College World Series where they defeated Vanderbilt in the Championship Series to win the program's and institution's first team national championship, as there have been individual national champions in various sports.

== Schedule and results ==
2022 Mississippi State Bulldogs baseball game log
Regular season (26–30)

February (4–3)
Date	Opponent	Rank	Site/stadium	Score	Win	Loss	Save	TV	Attendance	Overall record	SEC record
February 18	No. 24 Long Beach State	No. 4	Dudy Noble Field • Starkville, MS	**L** 0–3	Luis Ramirez (1–0)	**Landon Sims (0–1)**	Devereaux Harrison (1)	SECN+	10,223	0–1	–
February 19	No. 24 Long Beach State	No. 4	Dudy Noble Field • Starkville, MS	**L** 3–13	Marques Johnson (1–0)	**KC Hunt (0–1)**	none	SECN+	13,351	0–2	–
February 20	No. 24 Long Beach State	No. 4	Dudy Noble Field • Starkville, MS	**W** 12–4	**Cade Smith (1–0)**	Juaron Watts-Brown (0–1)	none	SECN+	10,751	1–2	–
February 22	Arkansas–Pine Bluff	No. 7	Dudy Noble Field • Starkville, MS	**W** 17–1^{7}	**Jackson Fristoe (1–0)**	Mike Gerwitz (0–1)	none	SECN+	7,908	2–2	–
February 25	Northern Kentucky	No. 7	Dudy Noble Field • Starkville, MS	**L** 6–7	Kyle Klingenbeck (1–1)	**Landon Sims (0–2)**	Bryson Lonsbury (1)	SECN+	8,879	2–3	–
February 26	Northern Kentucky	No. 7	Dudy Noble Field • Starkville, MS	**W** 10–1	**Preston Johnson (1–0)**	Ben Gerl (0–2)	none	SECN+	9,894	3–3	–
February 27	Northern Kentucky	No. 7	Dudy Noble Field • Starkville, MS	**W** 7–2	**Cade Smith (2–0)**	Kaden Echeman (0–1)	none	SECN+	8,654	4–3	–

March (12–7)
Date	Opponent	Rank	Site/stadium	Score	Win	Loss	Save	TV	Attendance	Overall record	SEC record
March 1	Grambling State	No. 9	Dudy Noble Field • Starkville, MS	**W** 2–1	**Parker Stinnett (1–0)**	Jacorey Boudreaux (0–1)	none	SECN+	8,535	5–3	–
March 2	vs. Southern Miss	No. 9	Trustmark Park • Pearl, MS	**L** 1–7	Tanner Hall (1–0)	**Jackson Fristoe (1–1)**	none		6,387	5–4	–
March 4	at Tulane	No. 9	Turchin Stadium • New Orleans, LA	**W** 19–2	**Brandon Smith (1–0)**	Tyler Hoffman (0–2)	none	ESPN+	2,905	6–4	–
March 5	at Tulane	No. 9	Turchin Stadium • New Orleans, LA	**L** 10–11^{10}	Zach Devito (2–0)	**Mikey Tepper (0–1)**	none	ESPN+	3,264	6–5	–
March 6	at Tulane	No. 9	Turchin Stadium • New Orleans, LA	**L** 4–5	Lane Thomas (1–0)	**Drew Talley (0–1)**	Zach Devito (2)	ESPN+	2,886	6–6	–
Hancock Whitney Classic
March 8	vs. No. 17 Texas Tech	No. 23	MGM Park • Biloxi, MS	**W** 11–5	**Parker Stinnett (2–0)**	Chase Hampton (1–1)	none	SECN+	5,799	7–6	–
March 9	vs. No. 17 Texas Tech	No. 23	MGM Park • Biloxi, MS	**L** 2–7	Colin Clark (1–0)	**Jackson Fristoe (1–2)**	none	SECN+	5,382	7–7	–
March 11	Princeton	No. 23	Dudy Noble Field • Starkville, MS	**W** 11–2	**Preston Johnson (2–0)**	Jackson Emus (0–2)	none	SECN+	8,998	8–7	–
March 13	Princeton (DH-1)	No. 23	Dudy Noble Field • Starkville, MS	**W** 3–2	**Parker Stinnett (3–0)**	Andrew D'Alessio (0–1)	**Mikey Tepper (1)**	SECN+	9,331	9–7	–
March 13	Princeton (DH-2)	No. 23	Dudy Noble Field • Starkville, MS	**W** 9–1^{7}	**Cade Smith (3–0)**	Tom Chmielewski (0–2)	none	SECN+	9,331	10–7	–
March 14	Binghamton	No. 23	Dudy Noble Field • Starkville, MS	**W** 13–5	**Brooks Auger (1–0)**	Troy Butler (0–1)	none	SECN+	8,469	11–7	–
March 18	at No. 20 Georgia	No. 23	Foley Field • Athens, GA	**L** 0–11	Jonathan Canaan (4–1)	**Preston Johnson (2–1)**	none	SECN	3,235	11–8	0–1
March 19	at No. 20 Georgia	No. 23	Foley Field • Athens, GA	**L** 11–12	Jack Gowen (1–0)	**Brandon Smith (1–1)**	none	SECN+	3,692	11–9	0–2
March 20	at No. 20 Georgia	No. 23	Foley Field • Athens, GA	**W** 20–3	**Cade Smith (4–0)**	Will Pearson (0–1)	none	SECN	3,373	12–9	1–2
March 23	Southern	–	Dudy Noble Field • Starkville, MS	**W** 14–5	**Pico Kohn (1–0)**	Khristian Paul (0–2)	none	SECN+	8,191	13–9	–
March 25	Alabama	–	Dudy Noble Field • Starkville, MS	**W** 7–6^{10}	**Brooks Auger (2–0)**	Dylan Ray (0–2)	none	SECN+	11,865	14–9	2–2
March 26	Alabama	–	Dudy Noble Field • Starkville, MS	**W** 8–7	**Jackson Fristoe (2–2)**	Hunter Hoopes (0–1)	none	SECN+	14,077	15–9	3–2
March 27	Alabama	–	Dudy Noble Field • Starkville, MS	**L** 2–6	Grayson Hitt (2–0)	**Cade Smith (4–1)**	Antoine Jean (1)	SECN	11,144	15–10	3–3
March 29	at Memphis	–	AutoZone Park • Memphis, TN	**W** 10–4	**Mikey Tepper (1–0)**	JT Durham (0–1)	**Jackson Fristoe (1)**	ESPN+	4,525	16–10	–

April (9–9)
Date	Opponent	Rank	Site/stadium	Score	Win	Loss	Save	TV	Attendance	Overall record	SEC record
April 1	at No. 2 Arkansas	–	Baum–Walker Stadium • Fayetteville, AR	**L** 1–8	Connor Noland (4–1)	**Preston Johnson (2–2)**	none	SECN	11,548	16–11	3–4
April 2	at No. 2 Arkansas	–	Baum–Walker Stadium • Fayetteville, AR	**L** 5–12	Hagen Smith (5–1)	**Parker Stinnett (3–1)**	none	SECN+	11,522	16–12	3–5
April 3	at No. 2 Arkansas	–	Baum–Walker Stadium • Fayetteville, AR	**W** 5–3^{12}	**Jackson Fristoe (3–2)**	Kole Ramage (0–2)	none	SECN+	11,415	17–12	4–5
April 5	UT Martin	–	Dudy Noble Field • Starkville, MS	**W** 13–2^{7}	**Brandon Smith (2–1)**	Noah Walters (1–1)	none	SECN+	8,441	18–12	–
April 8	No. 19 LSU	–	Dudy Noble Field • Starkville, MS	**L** 2–5	Riley Cooper (2–1)	**Jackson Fristoe (3–3)**	Paul Gervase (1)	SECN	11,893	18–13	4–6
April 9	No. 19 LSU	–	Dudy Noble Field • Starkville, MS	**L** 3–4	Devin Fontenot (2–1)	**Brandon Smith (2–2)**	Paul Gervase (2)	SECN+	14,228	18–14	4–7
April 10	No. 19 LSU	–	Dudy Noble Field • Starkville, MS	**L** 3–13	Grant Taylor (4–0)	**Cade Smith (4–2)**	none	SECN+	10,515	18–15	4–8
April 12	UAB	–	Dudy Noble Field • Starkville, MS	**W** 6–5^{10}	**KC Hunt (1–1)**	Carson Myers (2–3)	none	SECN+	8,424	19–15	–
Super Bulldog Weekend
April 14	No. 17 Auburn	–	Dudy Noble Field • Starkville, MS	**W** 7–6	**Parker Stinnett (4–1)**	Blake Burkhalter (3–1)	none	SECN	10,663	20–15	5–8
April 15	No. 17 Auburn	–	Dudy Noble Field • Starkville, MS	**W** 9–5	**Preston Johnson (3–2)**	Trace Bright (2–4)	**KC Hunt (1)**	SECN+	12,346	21–15	6–8
April 16	No. 17 Auburn	–	Dudy Noble Field • Starkville, MS	**L** 2–3	Joseph Gonzalez (5–0)	**Jackson Fristoe (3–4)**	Blake Burkhalter (8)	SECN+	9,799	21–16	6–9
April 19	Jackson State	–	Dudy Noble Field • Starkville, MS	**W** 17–2^{7}	**Jack Walker (1–0)**	Nick Johnson (0–2)	none	SECN+	9,119	22–16	–
April 21	at Ole Miss	–	Swayze Field • Oxford, MS	**L** 2–4	Dylan DeLucia (3–0)	**Brandon Smith (2–3)**	none	SECN	10,474	22–17	6–10
April 22	at Ole Miss	–	Swayze Field • Oxford, MS	**W** 10–7	**Pico Kohn (2–0)**	Jack Dougherty (1–2)	none	SECN+	12,078	23–17	7–10
April 23	at Ole Miss	–	Swayze Field • Oxford, MS	**W** 7–6^{11}	**KC Hunt (2–1)**	Brandon Johnson (1–2)	none	ESPN2	12,503	24–17	8–10
April 26	vs. Ole Miss; Governor's Cup	–	Trustmark Park • Pearl, MS	**L** 2–5	Drew McDaniel (4–2)	**Lane Forsythe (0–1)**	Brandon Johnson (4)	SECN+	7,920	24–18	–
April 29	at Missouri	–	Taylor Stadium • Columbia, MO	**W** 13–4	**Brandon Smith (3–3)**	Tony Neubeck (3–2)	none	SECN+	1,472	25–18	9–10
April 30	at Missouri	–	Taylor Stadium • Columbia, MO	**L** 8–19	Spencer Miles (3–4)	**Preston Johnson (3–3)**	Austin Marozas (1)	SECN+	2,336	25–19	9–11

May (1–11)
Date	Opponent	Rank	Site/stadium	Score	Win	Loss	Save	TV	Attendance	Overall record	SEC record
May 1	at Missouri	–	Taylor Stadium • Columbia, MO	**L** 6–7	Ian Lohse (2–2)	**KC Hunt (2–2)**	none	SECN	1,467	25–20	9–12
May 6	Florida	–	Dudy Noble Field • Starkville, MS	**L** 6–8	Brandon Sproat (6–4)	**Brandon Smith (3–4)**	Ryan Slater (3)	SECN	11,533	25–21	9–13
May 7	Florida	–	Dudy Noble Field • Starkville, MS	**L** 3–9	Ryan Slater (3–3)	**KC Hunt (2–3)**	none	ESPNU	12,297	25–22	9–14
May 8	Florida	–	Dudy Noble Field • Starkville, MS	**L** 2–6	Fisher Jameson (1–0)	**Pico Kohn (2–1)**	none	SECN+	9,356	25–23	9–15
May 10	vs. Samford	–	Hoover Metropolitan Stadium • Hoover, AL	**L** 6–8	Alex Goff (5–2)	**Mikey Tepper (1–2)**	Carson Hobbs (9)	ESPN+	1,175	25–24	–
May 13	at No. 10 Texas A&M	–	Blue Bell Park • College Station, TX	**L** 7–8	Joseph Menefee (4–2)	**KC Hunt (2–4)**	Will Johnston (1)	SECN+	6,175	25–25	9–16
May 14	at No. 10 Texas A&M	–	Blue Bell Park • College Station, TX	**L** 6–9	Chris Cortez (5–2)	**Pico Kohn (2–2)**	none	SECN+	6,094	25–26	9–17
May 15	at No. 10 Texas A&M	–	Blue Bell Park • College Station, TX	**L** 2–8	Robert Hogan (3–1)	**Cade Smith (4–3)**	Will Johnston (2)	SECN	5,252	25–27	9–18
May 17	North Alabama	–	Dudy Noble Field • Starkville, MS	**W** 14–4^{8}	**Drew Talley (1–1)**	Jacob Bradshaw (1–8)	none	SECN+	8,515	26–27	–
May 19	No. 1 Tennessee	–	Dudy Noble Field • Starkville, MS	**L** 2–27	Chase Dollander (8–0)	**Brandon Smith (3–5)**	none	SECN	10,206	26–28	9–19
May 20	No. 1 Tennessee	–	Dudy Noble Field • Starkville, MS	**L** 3–4	Blade Tidwell (2–1)	**Preston Johnson (3–4)**	none	SECN+	10,592	26–29	9–20
May 21	No. 1 Tennessee	–	Dudy Noble Field • Starkville, MS	**L** 5–10	Ben Joyce (3–1)	**Cade Smith (4–4)**	none	SECN+	10,774	26–30	9–21

Legend: = Win = Loss = Canceled
Bold = Mississippi State team member
Rankings are based on the team's current ranking in the D1Baseball poll.

== MLB draft ==
Player	Position	Round	Overall	MLB team
Landon Sims	RHP	1	34	Arizona Diamondbacks
Logan Tanner	C	2	55	Cincinnati Reds
Preston Johnson	RHP	7	197	Baltimore Orioles
K.C. Hunt	RHP	12	350	Pittsburgh Pirates
Jackson Fristoe	RHP	12	370	New York Yankees
Kamren James	SS	16	494	Tampa Bay Rays

== Player Eligibility ==
The following players have used up their eligibility and will not return for the next season: Jess Davis OF, RJ Yeager INF, and Drew Talley RHP.

== High School Recruits ==
Before any draftees are signed by their major league team, Mississippi State was ranked 6th in the nation by Perfect Game. Perfect Game ranks players nationwide as the top 500. If there is no ranking, then the player was not in the top 500. If draft is not indicated, then the player was not drafted in this years draft.

Player	Position	PGRnk	DftRd	DftOA	Draft MLB Team
Jett Williams	SS	20	1	14	New York Mets
Jurrangelo Cijntje	BHP	34	18	552	Milwaukee Brewers
Dakota Jordan	OF	69	—	—	—
Ross Highfill	C	73	—	—	—
Bradley Loftin	LHP	98	—	—	—
McClain Ray	RHP	342	—	—	—
Logan Forsythe	RHP	353	—	—	—
Will Gibbs	RHP	380	—	—	—
Evan Siary	RHP	394	—	—	—
Charlie Keller	3B	433	—	—	—
Colton Bradley	OF	—	—	—	—
Bryce Hubbard	C	—	—	—	—
David Mershon	SS	—	—	—	—
Jay Murdock	1B	—	—	—	—
Jackson Parker	1B	—	—	—	—
Brock Tapper	LHP	—	—	—	—
Austin Tommasini	RHP	—	—	—	—
Ryan Williams	C	—	—	—	—

== See also ==
- 2022 Mississippi State Bulldogs softball team
