= 2022 Texas A&M Aggies baseball team =

2022 Texas A&M Aggies baseball

SEC Western Division Champions NCAA College Station Regional Champions NCAA College Station Super Regional Champions

College World Series
- Conference: Southeastern Conference
- Western Division
- Record: 44–20 (19–11 SEC)
- Head coach: Jim Schlossnagle (1st season)
- Assistant coaches: Nate Yeskie; Michael Earley
- Home stadium: Olsen Field at Blue Bell Park

2022 Southeastern Conference baseball standings
	Conf.				Overall
Team	W		L	PCT	W		L	PCT
Eastern
No. 9 Tennessee ^{x}‍†‍‡‍^{y}	25	–	5	.833	57	–	9	.864
No. 21 Florida ‍‍‍^{y}	15	–	15	.500	42	–	24	.636
Georgia ‍‍‍^{y}	15	–	15	.500	36	–	23	.610
Vanderbilt ‍‍‍^{y}	14	–	16	.467	39	–	23	.629
South Carolina ‍‍‍	13	–	17	.433	27	–	28	.491
Kentucky ‍‍‍	12	–	18	.400	33	–	26	.559
Missouri ‍‍‍	10	–	20	.333	28	–	23	.549
Western
No. 3 Texas A&M ^{x}‍‍‍^{y}	19	–	11	.633	44	–	20	.688
No. 4 Arkansas ‍‍‍^{y}	18	–	12	.600	46	–	21	.687
No. 25 LSU ‍‍‍^{y}	17	–	13	.567	40	–	22	.645
No. 7 Auburn ‍‍‍^{y}	16	–	13	.552	43	–	22	.662
No. 1 Ole Miss ‍‍‍^{y}	14	–	16	.467	42	–	23	.646
Alabama ‍‍‍	12	–	17	.414	31	–	27	.534
Mississippi State ‍‍‍	9	–	21	.300	26	–	30	.464
x – Division champion † – Conference champion ‡ – Tournament champion y – Invited to the NCAA tournament Rankings from D1Baseball

The 2022 Texas A&M Aggies baseball team represented Texas A&M University in the 2022 NCAA Division I baseball season. The Aggies played their home games at Blue Bell Park.

== Previous season ==
The Aggies finished 29–27, 9–21 in the SEC to finish in last place in the West. The Aggies were not invited to the postseason. Rob Childress was fired after sixteen seasons as head coach. TCU head coach Jim Schlossnagle was hired on June 9, 2021.

== Schedule and results ==
2022 Texas A&M Aggies baseball game log
Regular season

February (5-2)
Date	Opponent	Rank	Site/stadium	Score	Win	Loss	Save	TV	Attendance	Overall record	SEC record
February 18	Fordham		Blue Bell Park; College Station, TX	**W** 13-1	**Dettmer (1–0)**	Karlso (0–1)	—	SECN+	6,431	1–0	—
February 19	Fordham		Blue Bell Park	**W** 5-3	**Dallas (1–0)**	Ey (0–1)	**Hogan (1)**	SECN+	5,988	2–0	—
February 20	Fordham		Blue Bell Park	**W** 5-4	**Cortez (1–0)**	Quintal (0–1)	—	SECN+	5,166	3–0	—
February 22	Lamar		Blue Bell Park	**W** 9-3	**Curtis (1–0)**	Williams (1–1)	—	SECN+	4,578	4–0	—
February 25	Penn		Blue Bell Park	**L** 1-2	Coady(1-0)	**Palisch(0-1)**	—	SECN+	4,311	4-1	—
February 27	Penn		Blue Bell Park	**W** 5-0	**Dallas (2-0)**	Miller(0-1)	—	SECN+	5,054	5-1	—
February 27	Penn		Blue Bell Park	**L** 5-8	Bean(1-0)	**Menefee (0-1)**	—	SECN+	5,054	5-2	—

March (10-7)
Date	Opponent	Rank	Site/stadium	Score	Win	Loss	Save	TV	Attendance	Overall record	SEC record
March 1	Houston Baptist		Blue Bell Park	**W** 3-2	**Curtis (2-0)**	Spinney (0-1)	**Rudis (1)**	SECN+	4,777	6-2	—
Frisco College Baseball Classic (1-2)
March 4	vs. Washington State		Riders Field; Frisco, TX	**L** 6-11	Taylor	**Dettmer (1-1)**	—	FloBaseball	5,672	6-3	—
March 5	vs. Iowa		Riders Field	**W** 7-5	**Palisch (1-1)**	Brecht	—	FloBaseball	7,712	7-3	—
March 6	vs. Wichita State		Riders Field	**L** 5-6	Holden	**Hogan (0-1)**	—	FloBaseball	4,189	7-4	—
March 8	Tarleton State		Blue Bell Park	**W** 4-1	**Cortez (2-0)**	Boyd	**Hogan (2)**	SECN+	4,517	8-4	—
March 12	Santa Clara		Blue Bell Park	**W** 10-2	**Dallas (3-0)**	Hales	—	SECN+	—	9-4	—
March 12	Santa Clara		Blue Bell Park	**L** 5-16	Sando	**Dettmer (1-2)**	—	SECN+	6,377	9-5	—
March 13	Santa Clara		Blue Bell Park	**W** 5-2	**Palisch (2-1)**	Reelfs	—	SECN+	4,830	10-5	—
March 15	Houston		Blue Bell Park	**L** 2-8	Sears	**Cortez (2-1)**	—	SECN+	5,950	10-6	—
March 18	at No. 13 LSU		Alex Box Stadium; Baton Rouge, LA	**W** 6-4	**Cortez (3-1)**	Reyzelman	—	SECN+	10,538	11-6	1-0
March 19	at No. 13 LSU		Alex Box Stadium	**W** 11-7	**Hogan (1-1)**	Fontenot	—	SECN+	10,904	12-6	2-0
March 20	at No. 13 LSU		Alex Box Stadium	**L** 6-7	Cooper	**Palisch (2-2)**	—	SECN	10,261	12-7	2-1
March 22	at Rice		Reckling Park; Houston, TX	**W** 15-8	**Hogan (2-1)**	Greenwood	—	ESPN+	3,174	13-7	—
March 25	Auburn		Blue Bell Park	**L** 5-6	Armstrong	**Menefee (0-2)**	Burkhalter	SECN+	7,492	13-8	2-2
March 26	Auburn		Blue Bell Park	**W** 5-4	**Rudis (1-0)**	Isbell	—	SECN+	6,342	14-8	3-2
March 27	Auburn		Blue Bell Park	**L** 9-13	Allsup	**Palisch (2-3)**	—	SECN+	5,828	14-9	3-3
March 29	at No. 8 Texas		UFCU Disch–Falk Field; Austin, TX	**W** 12-9	**Hector (1-0)**	Southard	—	LHN	7,990	15-9	—

April (12-6)
Date	Opponent	Rank	Site/stadium	Score	Win	Loss	Save	TV	Attendance	Overall record	SEC record
April 1	at Alabama		Sewell–Thomas Stadium; Tuscaloosa, AL	**W** 3-2	**Dettmer (2-2)**	McMillan	**Rudis (2)**	SECN+	4,325	16-9	4-3
April 2	at Alabama		Sewell–Thomas Stadium	**L** 9-10	Jean	**Johnston (0-1)**	Ray	SECN	4,277	16-10	4-4
April 3	at Alabama		Sewell–Thomas Stadium	**L** 4-8	Furtado	**Dallas (3-1)**	—	SECN+	3,337	16-11	4-5
April 5	No. 10 Texas State		Blue Bell Park	**W** 8-4	**Cortez (4-1)**	Sundgren	—	SECN+	5,371	17-11	—
April 7	Kentucky		Blue Bell Park	**W** 3-2	**Palisch (3-3)**	Harney	—	SECN	5,755	18-11	5-5
April 8	Kentucky		Blue Bell Park	**L** 3-7	Harper	**Prager (0-1)**	Guilfoil	SECN+	6,529	18-12	5-6
April 9	Kentucky		Blue Bell Park	**W** 17-3	**Dallas (4-1)**	Bosma	—	SECN	6,478	19-12	6-6
April 12	at Texas A&M–Corpus Christi		Whataburger Field; Corpus Christi, TX	**W** 5-3	**Menefee (1-2)**	Purcell	**Palisch (1)**	FloBaseball	3,279	20-12	—
April 14	at No. 13 Georgia		Foley Field; Athens, GA	**W** 8-1	**Dettmer (3-2)**	Crisp	—	SECN+	3,269	21-12	7-6
April 15	at No. 13 Georgia		Foley Field	**L** 3-4	Marsh	**Cortez (4-2)**	Gowen	SECN+	3,391	21-13	7-7
April 16	at No. 13 Georgia		Foley Field	**W** 23-9	**Rudis (2-0)**	Polk	—	SECN+	3,209	22-13	8-7
April 19	No. 23 Dallas Baptist		Blue Bell Park	**W** 14-1	**Prager (1-1)**	Heaton	—	SECN	5,579	23-13	—
April 22	No. 4 Arkansas		Blue Bell Park	**W** 2-1	**Dettmer (4-2)**	Noland	**Palish (2)**	SECN	6,972	24-13	9-7
April 23	No. 4 Arkansas		Blue Bell Park	**L** 1-3	Morris	**Dallas (4-2)**	Tygart	SECN+	7,012	24-14	9-8
April 24	No. 4 Arkansas		Blue Bell Park	**W** 11-10	**Rudis (3-0)**	Wiggins	**Palisch (3)**	SECN+	6,016	25-14	10-8
April 26	Sam Houston State		Blue Bell Park	–	Cancelled						
April 28	at Vanderbiilt	No. 21	Hawkins Field; Nashville, TN	**W** 5-1	**Dettmer (5-2)**	McElvain	**Palisch (4)**	ESPNU	3,802	26-14	11-8
April 29	at Vanderbilt	No. 21	Hawkins Field	**L** 1-11	Holton	**Dallas (4-3)**	Little	SECN+	3,802	26-15	11-9
April 30	at Vanderbilt	No. 21	Hawkins Field	**W** 12-4	**Menefee (2-2)**	Cunningham	—	SECN+	3,802	27-15	12-9

May (8-2)
Date	Opponent	Rank	Site/stadium	Score	Win	Loss	Save	TV	Attendance	Overall record	SEC record
May 3	UT Arlington	No. 13	Blue Bell Park	**W** 10-5	**Johnston (1-1)**	Hunter	—	SECN+	5,168	28-15	—
May 6	South Carolina	No. 13	Blue Bell Park	**W** 16-4	**Menefee (3-2)**	Thomas	—	SECN+	6,003	29-15	13-9
May 7	South Carolina	No. 13	Blue Bell Park	**W** 13-12	**Palisch (4-3)**	Becker	—	SECN+	5,806	30-15	14-9
May 8	South Carolina	No. 13	Blue Bell Park	**L** 4-9	Sanders	**Prager (1-2)**	—	SECN+	5,037	30-16	14-10
May 13	Mississippi State	No. 10	Blue Bell Park	**W** 8-7	**Menefee (4-2)**	Hunt	**Johnston (1)**	SECN+	6,175	31-16	15-10
May 14	Mississippi State	No. 10	Blue Bell Park	**W** 9-6	**Cortez (5-2)**	Kohn	—	SECN+	6,094	32-16	16-10
May 15	Mississippi State	No. 10	Blue Bell Park	**W** 8-2	**Hogan (3-1)**	Smith	**Johnston (2)**	SECN	5,252	33-16	17-10
May 17	Incarnate Word		Blue Bell Park	–	Cancelled						
May 19	at Ole Miss	No. 6	Swayze Field; Oxford, MS	**W** 10-5	**Menefee (5-2)**	DeLucia	**Johnston (3)**	SECN+	9,293	34-16	18-10
May 20	at Ole Miss	No. 6	Swayze Field	**L** 6-14	Washburn	**Cortez (5-3)**	Mallitz	SECN+	9,609	34-17	18-11
May 21	at Ole Miss	No. 6	Swayze Field	**W** 12-5	**Menefee (6-2)**	McDaniel	—	SECN+	9,744	35-17	19-11

Postseason

SEC Tournament (2-1)
Date	Opponent	Seed	Site/stadium	Score	Win	Loss	Save	TV	Attendance	Overall record	SECT Record
May 26	Florida	(2)	Hoover Metropolitan Stadium; Hoover, AL	**W** 10-0	**Dallas (5-3)**	Neely	**Menefee (1)**	SECN	8,251	36-17	1-0
May 27	Alabama	(2)	Hoover Metropolitan Stadium	**W** 12-8	**Cortez (6-3)**	Guffey	**Johnston (4)**	SECN	—	37-17	2-0
May 28	Florida	(2)	Hoover Metropolitan Stadium	**L** 0-9	Manning	**Prager (1-3)**	Jameson	SECN	—	37-18	2-1

College Station Regional (3-0)
Date	Opponent	Seed	Site/stadium	Score	Win	Loss	Save	TV	Attendance	Overall record	NCAAT record
June 3	Oral Roberts	(1)	Blue Bell Park	**W** 8-2	**Dallas (6-3)**	Smith	—	ESPN+	6,215	38-18	1-0
June 4	Louisiana	(1)	Blue Bell Park	**W** 9-6	**Palisch (5-3)**	Ray	**Rudis (3)**	ESPN+	6,675	39-18	2-0
June 5	TCU	(1)	Blue Bell Park	**W** 15-9	**Johnston (2-1)**	Ridings	—	SECN	6,525	40-18	3-0

College Station Super Regional (2-0)
Date	Opponent	Seed	Site/stadium	Score	Win	Loss	Save	TV	Attendance	Overall record	NCAAT record
June 10	No. 12 Louisville	(1)	Blue Bell Park	**W** 8-2	**Palisch (6-3)**	Prosecky	—	ESPN	6,732	41-18	4-0
June 11	No. 12 Louisville	(1)	Blue Bell Park	**W** 9-6	**Johnston (3-1)**	Hawks	**Palisch (5)**	ESPN2	6,656	42-18	5-0

College World Series (2-2)
Date	Opponent	Rank	Site/stadium	Score	Win	Loss	Save	TV	Attendance	Overall record	CWS record
June 17	Oklahoma	No. 5	TD Ameritrade Park • Omaha, NE	**L** 8-13	Bennett	**Dettmer (5-3)**	—	ESPN	23,886	42-19	0-1
June 19	No. 9 Texas	No. 5	TD Ameritrade Park • Omaha, NE	**W** 10-2	**Dallas (7-3)**	Gordon	—	ESPN	24,056	43-19	1-1
June 21	Notre Dame	No. 5	TD Ameritrade Park • Omaha, NE	**W** 5-1	**Dettmer (6-3)**	Simon	**Menefee (2)**	ESPN	23,618	44-19	2-1
June 22	Oklahoma	No. 5	TD Ameritrade Park • Omaha, NE	**L** 1-5	Sandlin	**Prager (1-4)**	—	ESPN	23,827	44-20	2-2

Legend: = Win = Loss = Canceled
Bold = Texas A&M team member
Rankings are based on the team's current ranking in the D1Baseball poll.

== See also ==
- 2022 Texas A&M Aggies softball team
