= 2022 Ole Miss Rebels baseball team =

American college baseball season

2022 Ole Miss Rebels baseball

College World Series National champions Hattiesburg Super Regional Champion Coral Gables Regional Champion
- Conference: Southeastern Conference
- Western Division
- Record: 42–23 (14–16 SEC)
- Head coach: Mike Bianco (22nd season)
- Assistant coaches: Mike Clement; Carl Lafferty
- Home stadium: Swayze Field

2022 Southeastern Conference baseball standings
| | Conf. | | | | Overall |
| Team | W | | L | PCT | W | | L | PCT |
|---|---|---|---|---|---|---|---|---|
Eastern
| No. 9 Tennessee ^{x}‍†‍‡‍^{y} | 25 | – | 5 | .833 | 57 | – | 9 | .864 |
| No. 21 Florida ‍‍‍^{y} | 15 | – | 15 | .500 | 42 | – | 24 | .636 |
| Georgia ‍‍‍^{y} | 15 | – | 15 | .500 | 36 | – | 23 | .610 |
| Vanderbilt ‍‍‍^{y} | 14 | – | 16 | .467 | 39 | – | 23 | .629 |
| South Carolina ‍‍‍ | 13 | – | 17 | .433 | 27 | – | 28 | .491 |
| Kentucky ‍‍‍ | 12 | – | 18 | .400 | 33 | – | 26 | .559 |
| Missouri ‍‍‍ | 10 | – | 20 | .333 | 28 | – | 23 | .549 |
Western
| No. 3 Texas A&M ^{x}‍‍‍^{y} | 19 | – | 11 | .633 | 44 | – | 20 | .688 |
| No. 4 Arkansas ‍‍‍^{y} | 18 | – | 12 | .600 | 46 | – | 21 | .687 |
| No. 25 LSU ‍‍‍^{y} | 17 | – | 13 | .567 | 40 | – | 22 | .645 |
| No. 7 Auburn ‍‍‍^{y} | 16 | – | 13 | .552 | 43 | – | 22 | .662 |
| No. 1 Ole Miss ‍‍‍^{y} | 14 | – | 16 | .467 | 42 | – | 23 | .646 |
| Alabama ‍‍‍ | 12 | – | 17 | .414 | 31 | – | 27 | .534 |
| Mississippi State ‍‍‍ | 9 | – | 21 | .300 | 26 | – | 30 | .464 |
x – Division champion † – Conference champion ‡ – Tournament champion y – Invited to the NCAA tournament Rankings from D1Baseball

The 2022 Ole Miss Rebels baseball team represented the University of Mississippi in the 2022 NCAA Division I baseball season. The Rebels played their home games at Swayze Field. In 2022, the Rebels went from the last team into the field of 64 NCAA tournament to the National Champions. The Rebels began their post-season with a loss in the SEC Tournament to Vanderbilt before they got hot. As the 3 seed in the Miami regional, the Rebels demolished the field, defeating Arizona, the host team Miami, and Arizona again to head to a Super Regional. In the Super Regionals, the Rebels traveled to Hattiesburg, MS where Southern Mississippi played host. In front of record crowds, Ole Miss outscored Southern Miss 15-0 in a two-game routing to head to Omaha for the first time since 2014. In Omaha, the Rebels remained hot, taking down Auburn and SEC foe Arkansas, before losing its first postseason game to Arkansas in a potential elimination game for the Razorbacks. In game three of the series against Arkansas, Rebel pitcher Dylan DeLucia threw a complete-game shutout to push the Rebels to their first College World Series championship game in program history. The Rebels ran through Oklahoma in two games to win the 2022 College World Series and complete their last-to-first run. The team was featured in the 2022 documentary, Belief: The Season Ole Miss Baseball.

== Previous season ==
The Rebels finished 45–22, 18–12 in the SEC to finish in third place in the West division. They hosted and won the Oxford Regional as the No. 12 national seed before falling to No. 5 Arizona in game three of the Tucson Super Regional.

== Schedule and results ==
2022 Ole Miss Rebels baseball game log
Regular season

February
| Date | Opponent | Rank | Site/stadium | Score | Win | Loss | Save | TV | Attendance | Overall record | SEC record |
|---|---|---|---|---|---|---|---|---|---|---|---|
| February 18 | Charleston Southern | No. 5 | Swayze Field; Oxford, MS | **W** 9–3 | Derek Diamond (1–0) | Bryce Brock (0–1) | | SECN+ | 11,146 | 1–0 | |
| February 19 | Charleston Southern | No. 5 | Swayze Field | **W** 11–1^{7} | John Gaddis (1–0) | Jerry Couch (0–1) | | SECN+ | 11,621 | 2–0 | |
| February 20 | Charleston Southern | No. 5 | Swayze Field | **W** 12–2^{8} | Drew McDaniel (1–0) | Evan Truitt (0–1) | | SECN+ | 10,121 | 3–0 | |
| February 23 | Arkansas State | No. 3 | Swayze Field | **W** 15–5^{5} | Cole Baker (1–0) | Walker Williams (0–1) | | SECN+ | 8,653 | 4–0 | |
| February 25 | VCU | No. 3 | Swayze Field | **W** 10–4 | Derek Diamond (2–0) | Jack Masloff (0–1) | | SECN+ | 9,209 | 5–0 | |
| February 26 | VCU | No. 3 | Swayze Field | **Canceled (inclement weather)** | | | | | | | |
| February 27 | VCU | No. 3 | Swayze Field | **W** 14–3^{7} | Drew McDaniel (2–0) | Campbell Ellis (0–1) | | SECN+ | 8,926 | 6–0 | |

March
| Date | Opponent | Rank | Site/stadium | Score | Win | Loss | Save | TV | Attendance | Overall record | SEC record |
|---|---|---|---|---|---|---|---|---|---|---|---|
| March 1 | Louisiana–Monroe | No. 2 | Swayze Field | **W** 10–2 | **Hunter Elliott (1–0)** | Henry Shuffler (0–1) | **Jack Dougherty (1)** | SECN+ | 9,407 | 7–0 | |
| March 2 | Louisiana–Monroe | No. 2 | Swayze Field | **W** 11–1^{7} | **Jack Washburn (1–0)** | Cole Cressend (0–1) | | SECN+ | 9,499 | 8–0 | |
| March 4 | at UCF | No. 2 | John Euliano Park; Orlando, FL | **W** 8–7 | **Riley Maddox (1–0)** | Ben Vespi (0–2) | **Brandon Johnson (1)** | ESPN+ | 3,033 | 9–0 | |
| March 5 | at UCF | No. 2 | John Euliano Park | **L** 0–1^{12} | Chase Centala (1–0) | **Hunter Elliott (1–1)** | | ESPN+ | 2,921 | 9–1 | |
| March 6 | at UCF | No. 2 | John Euliano Park | **W** 9–1 | **Jackson Kimbrell (1–0)** | Hunter Patteson (2–1) | **Dylan DeLucia (1)** | ESPN+ | 2,331 | 10–1 | |
| March 9 | Alcorn State | No. 2 | Swayze Field | **W** 16–1^{7} | **Jack Washburn (2–0)** | Austin Guzman (0–1) | | SECN+ | 8,993 | 11–1 | |
| March 11 | Oral Roberts | No. 2 | Swayze Field | **W** 16–2 | **John Gaddis (2–0)** | Isaac Coffey (2–2) | | SECN+ | 9,195 | 12–1 | |
| March 13 | Oral Roberts | No. 2 | Swayze Field | **W** 6–2^{7} | **Derek Diamond (3–0)** | Ledgend Smith (2–1) | **Brandon Johnson (2)** | SECN+ | 9,497 | 13–1 | |
| March 13 | Oral Roberts | No. 2 | Swayze Field | **L** 4–8^{7} | AJ Archambo (3–0) | **Hunter Elliott (1–2)** | | SECN+ | 9,047 | 13–2 | |
| March 15 | at Southeastern Louisiana | No. 1 | Pat Kenelly Diamond at Alumni Field; Hammond, LA | **L** 1–5 | Adam Guth (1–0) | **Jack Washburn (2–1)** | | ESPN+ | 2,915 | 13–3 | |
| March 17 | at Auburn | No. 1 | Plainsman Park; Auburn, AL | **W** 13–6 | **Dylan DeLucia (1–0)** | Mason Barnett (1–1) | | SECN | 3,926 | 14–3 | 1–0 |
| March 18 | at Auburn | No. 1 | Plainsman Park | **L** 5–19 | Hayden Mullins (2–1) | **Derek Diamond (3–1)** | | SECN+ | 3,435 | 14–4 | 1–1 |
| March 19 | at Auburn | No. 1 | Plainsman Park | **W** 15–2 | **Jack Dougherty (1–0)** | Trace Bright (2–1) | | SECN+ | 4,096 | 15–4 | 2–1 |
| March 22 | at Memphis | No. 1 | AutoZone Park; Memphis, TN | **Canceled (inclement weather)** | | | | | | | |
| March 23 | Memphis | No. 1 | Swayze Field | **W** 11–8 | **Riley Maddox (2–0)** | David Warren (0–1) | **Brandon Johnson (3)** | SECN+ | 9,010 | 16–4 | |
| March 25 | No. 5 Tennessee | No. 1 | Swayze Field | **L** 1–12 | Chase Burns (5–0) | **John Gaddis (2–1)** | | SECN+ | 11,337 | 16–5 | 2–2 |
| March 26 | No. 5 Tennessee | No. 1 | Swayze Field | **L** 3–10 | Chase Dollander (4–0) | **Jack Dougherty (1–1)** | | SECN | 12,134 | 16–6 | 2–3 |
| March 27 | No. 5 Tennessee | No. 1 | Swayze Field | **L** 3–4 | Drew Beam (5–0) | **Derek Diamond (3–2)** | Redmond Walsh (3) | SECN+ | 9,967 | 16–7 | 2–4 |
| March 29 | North Alabama | No. 10 | Swayze Field | **W** 20-3^{7} | **Jack Washburn (3-1)** | Austin Nichols (0-4) | | SECN+ | 9,140 | 17–7 | |

April
| Date | Opponent | Rank | Site/stadium | Score | Win | Loss | Save | TV | Attendance | Overall record | SEC record |
|---|---|---|---|---|---|---|---|---|---|---|---|
| April 1 | at Kentucky | No. 10 | Kentucky Proud Park; Lexington, KY | **W** 2–1 | **Brandon Johnson (1–0)** | Sean Harney (4–1) | | SECN+ | 2,042 | 18–7 | 3–4 |
| April 2 | at Kentucky | No. 10 | Kentucky Proud Park | **L** 2–9 | Darren Williams (3–0) | **Riley Maddox (2–1)** | Daniel Harper (1) | SECN+ | 2,339 | 18–8 | 3–5 |
| April 3 | at Kentucky | No. 10 | Kentucky Proud Park | **W** 10–1 | **Jack Washburn (4–1)** | Tyler Bosma (3–2) | | SECN+ | 2,480 | 19–8 | 4–5 |
| April 5 | vs. No. 18 Southern Miss | No. 9 | Trustmark Park; Pearl, MS | **L** 7–10 | Garrett Ramsey (3–0) | **Brandon Johnson (1–1** | Landon Harper (4) | | 4,530 | 19–9 | |
| April 8 | Alabama | No. 9 | Swayze Field | **L** 4–7 | Garrett McMillan (3–2) | **Hunter Elliott (1–3)** | | SECN+ | 10,067 | 19–10 | 4–6 |
| April 9 | Alabama | No. 9 | Swayze Field | **L** 10–12^{10} | Dylan Ray (1–2) | **Brandon Johnson (1–2)** | | SECN+ | 12,045 | 19–11 | 4–7 |
| April 10 | Alabama | No. 9 | Swayze Field | **L** 3–7 | Grayson Hitt (3–0) | **Jack Washburn (4–2)** | | SECN | 9,649 | 19–12 | 4–8 |
| April 12 | Murray State | No. 25 | Swayze Field | **W** 8–2 | **Drew McDaniel (3–0)** | Ryan Fender (0–1) | | SECN+ | 11,331 | 20–12 | |
| April 14 | at South Carolina | No. 25 | Founders Park; Columbia, SC | **W** 9–1 | **Dylan DeLucia (2–0)** | Aidan Hunter (5–4) | | SECN+ | 6,239 | 21–12 | 5–8 |
| April 15 | at South Carolina | No. 25 | Founders Park | **L** 2–4 | Noah Hall (2–4) | **Derek Diamond (3–3)** | Matthew Becker (3) | SECN+ | 7,027 | 21–13 | 5–9 |
| April 16 | at South Carolina | No. 25 | Founders Park | **L** 8–9 | Cade Austin (2–1) | **Drew McDaniel (3–1)** | | SECN+ | 7,162 | 21–14 | 5–10 |
| April 19 | Southeast Missouri State | | Swayze Field | **L** 3–13 | Austin Williams (5–1) | **Drew McDaniel (3–2)** | | SECN+ | 8,854 | 21–15 | |
| April 21 | Mississippi State | | Swayze Field | **W** 4–2 | **Dylan DeLucia (3–0)** | Brandon Smith (2–3) | | SECN | 10,474 | 22–15 | 6–10 |
| April 22 | Mississippi State | | Swayze Field | **L** 7–10 | Pico Kohn (2–0) | **Jack Dougherty (1–2)** | | SECN+ | 12,078 | 22–16 | 6–11 |
| April 23 | Mississippi State | | Swayze Field | **L** 6–7^{11} | KC Hunt (2–1) | **Brandon Johnson (1–2)** | | ESPN2 | 12,503 | 22–17 | 6–12 |
| April 26 | vs. Mississippi State | | Trustmark Park | **W** 5–2 | **Drew McDaniel (4–2)** | Lane Forsythe (0–1) | **Brandon Johnson (4)** | SECN+ | 7,920 | 23–17 | |
| April 29 | at No. 5 Arkansas | | Baum–Walker Stadium; Fayetteville, AR | **W** 4–2 | **Dylan DeLucia (4–0)** | Connor Noland (5–3) | **Brandon Johnson (5)** | SECN+ | 11,651 | 24–17 | 7–12 |
| April 30 | at No. 5 Arkansas | | Baum–Walker Stadium | **L** 3–6 | Brady Tygart (2–1) | **Jack Dougherty (1–3)** | | ESPN2 | 11,736 | 24–18 | 7–13 |

May
| Date | Opponent | Rank | Site/stadium | Score | Win | Loss | Save | TV | Attendance | Overall record | SEC record |
|---|---|---|---|---|---|---|---|---|---|---|---|
| May 1 | at No. 5 Arkansas | | Baum–Walker Stadium | **L** 3–4 | Zack Morris (4–0) | **Derek Diamond (3–4)** | Brady Tygart (7) | ESPN2 | 11,409 | 24–19 | 7–14 |
| May 6 | Missouri | | Swayze Field | **W** 7–5 | **Jack Dougherty (2–3)** | Austin Troesser (3–2) | **Brandon Johnson (6)** | SECN+ | 9,176 | 25–19 | 8–14 |
| May 7 | Missouri | | Swayze Field | **W** 8–1 | **Hunter Elliott (2–3)** | Spencer Miles (3–5) | | SECN+ | 9,295 | 26–19 | 9–14 |
| May 8 | Missouri | | Swayze Field | **W** 10–2 | **Derek Diamond (4–4)** | Austin Marozas (1–3) | **John Gaddis (1)** | SECN+ | 8,929 | 27–19 | 10–14 |
| May 11 | at No. 14 Southern Miss | | Pete Taylor Park; Hattiesburg, MS | **W** 4–1 | **Drew McDaniel (5–2)** | Matthew Adams (1–1) | **Brandon Johnson (7)** | ESPN+ | 6,346 | 28–19 | |
| May 14 | at No. 17 LSU | | Alex Box Stadium; Baton Rouge, LA | **W** 5–3 | **Dylan DeLucia (5–0)** | Ma'Khail Hilliard (5–1) | **Brandon Johnson (8)** | ESPN2 | 11,242 | 29–19 | 11–14 |
| May 14 | at No. 17 LSU | | Alex Box Stadium | **W** 11–1 | **Hunter Elliott (3–3)** | Devin Fontenot (2–2) | | SECN | 11,124 | 30–19 | 12–14 |
| May 15 | at No. 17 LSU | | Alex Box Stadium | **W** 8–5 | **John Gaddis (3–1)** | Eric Reyzelman (1–2) | **Brandon Johnson (9)** | SECN+ | 10,671 | 31–19 | 13–14 |
| May 17 | at Arkansas State | | Tomlinson Stadium–Kell Field; Jonesboro, AR | | | | | | | | |
| May 19 | No. 6 Texas A&M | | Swayze Field | **L** 5–10 | Joseph Menefee (5–2) | **Dylan DeLucia (5–1)** | Will Johnston (3) | SECN+ | 9,293 | 31–20 | 13–15 |
| May 20 | No. 6 Texas A&M | | Swayze Field | **W** 14–6 | **Jack Washburn (5–2)** | Chris Cortez (5–3) | **Josh Mallitz (1)** | SECN+ | 9,609 | 32–20 | 14–15 |
| May 21 | No. 6 Texas A&M | | Swayze Field | **L** 5–12 | Joseph Menefee (6–2) | **Drew McDaniel (5–3)** | | SECN+ | 9,744 | 32–21 | 14–16 |

Postseason

SEC Tournament
| Date | Opponent | Seed | Site/stadium | Score | Win | Loss | Save | TV | Attendance | Overall record | SECT Record |
|---|---|---|---|---|---|---|---|---|---|---|---|
| May 24 | vs. (8) Vanderbilt | (9) | Hoover Metropolitan Stadium; Hoover, AL | **L** 1–3 | Carter Holton (8–3) | **Dylan DeLucia (5–2)** | Christian Little (3) | SECN | | 32–22 | 0–1 |

Coral Gables Regional
| Date | Opponent | Seed | Site/stadium | Score | Win | Loss | Save | TV | Attendance | Overall record | NCAAT record |
|---|---|---|---|---|---|---|---|---|---|---|---|
| June 4 | vs. (2) Arizona | (3) | Alex Rodriguez Park at Mark Light Field; Coral Gables, FL | **W** 7–4 | **Josh Mallitz (1–0)** | Javyn Pimental (1–1) | **Brandon Johnson (10)** | ESPN+ | 2,161 | 33–22 | 1–0 |
| June 5 | at (1) No. 6 Miami (FL) | (3) | Alex Rodriguez Park at Mark Light Field | **W** 2–1 | **Mason Nichols (1–0)** | Alex McFarlane (3–2) | **Brandon Johnson (11)** | ESPN+ | 3,039 | 34–22 | 2–0 |
| June 6 | vs. (2) Arizona | (3) | Alex Rodriguez Park at Mark Light Field | **W** 22–6 | **Jack Dougherty (3–3)** | Eric Orloff (2–3) | | ESPN+ | 2,098 | 35–22 | 3–0 |

Hattiesburg Super Regional
| Date | Opponent | Seed | Site/stadium | Score | Win | Loss | Save | TV | Attendance | Overall record | NCAAT record |
|---|---|---|---|---|---|---|---|---|---|---|---|
| June 11 | at (11) Southern Miss | | Pete Taylor Park | **W** 10–0 | **Dylan DeLucia (6–2)** | Hurston Waldrep (6–2) | **Jack Dougherty (2)** | ESPNU | 5,474 | 36–22 | 4–0 |
| June 12 | at (11) Southern Miss | | Pete Taylor Park | **W** 5–0 | **Hunter Elliott (4–3)** | Tanner Hall (9–3) | **Josh Mallitz (2)** | ESPNU | 5,469 | 37–22 | 5–0 |

College World Series
| Date | Opponent | Seed | Site/stadium | Score | Win | Loss | Save | TV | Attendance | Overall record | NCAAT record |
|---|---|---|---|---|---|---|---|---|---|---|---|
| June 18 | vs. (14) Auburn | | Charles Schwab Field Omaha; Omaha, NE | **W** 5–1 | **Dylan DeLucia (7–2)** | Joseph Gonzalez (7–4) | | ESPN2 | 25,217 | 38–22 | 6–0 |
| June 20 | vs. Arkansas | | Charles Schwab Field Omaha | **W** 13–5 | **Hunter Elliott (5–3)** | Zack Morris (6–1) | | ESPN | 25,246 | 39–22 | 7–0 |
| June 22 | vs. Arkansas | | Charles Schwab Field Omaha | **L** 2–3 | Hagen Smith (7-2) | **John Gaddis (3–2)** | Zach Morris (1) | ESPN | 25,401 | 39–23 | 7–1 |
| June 23 | vs. Arkansas | | Charles Schwab Field Omaha | **W** 2–0 | **Dylan DeLucia (8–2)** | Connor Noland (8–6) | | ESPN2 | 20,434 | 40–23 | 8–1 |
| June 25 | vs. Oklahoma | | Charles Schwab Field Omaha | **W** 10–3 | **Jack Dougherty (4–3)** | Jake Bennett (10–4) | | ESPN | 25,813 | 41–23 | 9–1 |
| June 26 | vs. Oklahoma | | Charles Schwab Field Omaha | **W** 4–2 | **John Gaddis (4–2)** | Trevin Michael (4–2) | **Brandon Johnson (12)** | ESPN | 25,972 | 42–23 | 10–1 |
Legend: = Win = Loss = Canceled Bold = Ole Miss team member Rankings are based on the team's current ranking in the D1Baseball poll.

== Roster ==
2022 Ole Miss Rebels baseball team
Players
Coaches

| # | Pos. | Name | B/T | Height | Weight | Year | Previous school | Home town |
|---|---|---|---|---|---|---|---|---|
| 1 | INF | Peyton Chatagnier | R/R | 5 ft 10 in (1.78 m) | 175 lb (79 kg) | Jr | Cy-Fair | Cypress, TX |
| 2 | RHP | Derek Diamond | R/R | 6 ft 2 in (1.88 m) | 200 lb (91 kg) | Jr | Ramona | Ramona, CA |
| 3 | OF | Hudson Sapp | R/R | 5 ft 10 in (1.78 m) | 190 lb (86 kg) | RS Fr | Dawson County | Dawsonville, GA |
| 4 | C | Knox Loposer | R/R | 5 ft 10 in (1.78 m) | 195 lb (88 kg) | Sr | Jackson Prep | Madison, MS |
| 6 | INF | Reagan Burford | R/R | 6 ft 0 in (1.83 m) | 180 lb (82 kg) | So | St. George's; Northwest Florida State College | Germantown, TN |
| 7 | INF | Jacob Gonzalez | L/R | 6 ft 2 in (1.88 m) | 200 lb (91 kg) | So | Glendora | Glendora, CA |
| 8 | OF | Justin Bench | R/R | 6 ft 0 in (1.83 m) | 185 lb (84 kg) | Sr | Calvary Christian | Redington Beach, FL |
| 9 | OF | Hayden Leatherwood | L/R | 6 ft 1 in (1.85 m) | 200 lb (91 kg) | Sr | Christian Brothers; Northwest Mississippi CC | Collierville, TN |
| 12 | OF | Kemp Alderman | R/R | 6 ft 3 in (1.91 m) | 265 lb (120 kg) | So | Newton County Academy | Decatur, MS |
| 13 | C | Hayden Dunhurst | L/R | 5 ft 11 in (1.8 m) | 220 lb (100 kg) | Jr | Pearl River Central | Carriere, MS |
| 14 | INF | Tim Simay | R/R | 6 ft 0 in (1.83 m) | 160 lb (73 kg) | Fr | Mill Creek | Hoschton, GA |
| 16 | INF | TJ McCants | L/R | 6 ft 3 in (1.91 m) | 190 lb (86 kg) | So | Pensacola Catholic | Cantonment, FL |
| 17 | OF | John Kramer | L/L | 6 ft 1 in (1.85 m) | 215 lb (98 kg) | Fr | Lafayette | Wildwood, MO |
| 18 | RHP | Mitch Murrell | R/R | 6 ft 4 in (1.93 m) | 210 lb (95 kg) | Jr | Ocean Springs | Ocean Springs, MS |
| 19 | RHP | Matt Parenteau | R/R | 6 ft 6 in (1.98 m) | 220 lb (100 kg) | Jr | Guerin College Prep; Parkland College | Carmel, IN |
| 20 | C | Calvin Harris | L/R | 6 ft 0 in (1.83 m) | 205 lb (93 kg) | So | Western Dubuque | Peosta, IA |
| 21 | RHP | Drew McDaniel | R/R | 6 ft 2 in (1.88 m) | 185 lb (84 kg) | Jr | St. Thomas More Catholic | Lafayette, LA |
| 22 | RHP | Max Cioffi | R/R | 6 ft 4 in (1.93 m) | 220 lb (100 kg) | Sr | St. Patrick | Chicago, IL |
| 23 | RHP | Josh Mallitz | R/R | 6 ft 3 in (1.91 m) | 195 lb (88 kg) | So | Tampa Jesuit | Tampa, FL |
| 24 | LHP | Jackson Kimbrell | R/L | 6 ft 1 in (1.85 m) | 195 lb (88 kg) | Jr | Oak Mountain | Birmingham, AL |
| 25 | INF | Tim Elko | R/R | 6 ft 4 in (1.93 m) | 240 lb (109 kg) | Sr | Hillsborough | Lutz, FL |
| 26 | LHP | Hunter Elliott | L/L | 6 ft 3 in (1.91 m) | 205 lb (93 kg) | Fr | Tupelo | Tupelo, MS |
| 27 | LHP | John Gaddis | L/L | 6 ft 0 in (1.83 m) | 190 lb (86 kg) | Sr | Calallen; Texas A&M–Corpus Christi | Corpus Christi, TX |
| 28 | OF | Banks Tolley | R/R | 6 ft 0 in (1.83 m) | 185 lb (84 kg) | Jr | St. Andrew's Episcopal; Meridian CC | Madison, MS |
| 31 | LHP | Luke Ellis | L/L | 6 ft 1 in (1.85 m) | 175 lb (79 kg) | Fr | St. Benedict at Auburndale | Somerville, TN |
| 32 | RHP | Noah Magee | R/R | 6 ft 0 in (1.83 m) | 220 lb (100 kg) | Jr | Simpson Academy; Hinds CC | Mount Olive, MS |
| 33 | INF | Ben Van Cleve | R/R | 6 ft 3 in (1.91 m) | 265 lb (120 kg) | Sr | Indianola Academy; Northwest Mississippi CC | Indianola, MS |
| 34 | RHP | Riley Maddox | R/R | 6 ft 1 in (1.85 m) | 185 lb (84 kg) | Fr | Jackson Prep | Pearl, MS |
| 35 | INF | Kevin Graham | L/R | 6 ft 1 in (1.85 m) | 195 lb (88 kg) | Sr | Westminster Christian Academy | O'Fallon, MO |
| 37 | RHP | Brandon Johnson | R/R | 6 ft 0 in (1.83 m) | 195 lb (88 kg) | Sr | Brookwood; Columbia State CC | Cottondale, AL |
| 38 | RHP | Logan Savell | R/R | 6 ft 4 in (1.93 m) | 185 lb (84 kg) | RS Jr | Madison Central | Madison, MS |
| 39 | RHP | Jack Dougherty | R/R | 6 ft 4 in (1.93 m) | 215 lb (98 kg) | So | Collierville | Collierville, TN |
| 40 | INF | Garrett Wood | R/R | 5 ft 11 in (1.8 m) | 175 lb (79 kg) | Sr | Claremore; Johnson County CC | Claremore, OK |
| 43 | RHP | Cole Baker | R/R | 6 ft 2 in (1.88 m) | 195 lb (88 kg) | Jr | Hoover | Hoover, AL |
| 44 | RHP | Dylan DeLucia | R/R | 6 ft 1 in (1.85 m) | 205 lb (93 kg) | Jr | New Smyrna Beach; Northwest Florida State College | Port Orange, FL |
| 45 | RHP | Mason Nichols | R/R | 6 ft 5 in (1.96 m) | 205 lb (93 kg) | Fr | Jackson Prep | Jackson, MS |
| 46 | RHP | Brayden Jones | R/R | 6 ft 0 in (1.83 m) | 185 lb (84 kg) | Fr | Madison-Ridgeland Academy | Madison, MS |
| 49 | RHP | Brayden Sanders | R/R | 5 ft 10 in (1.78 m) | 190 lb (86 kg) | Fr | Lewisburg | Olive Branch, MS |
| 50 | RHP | Blake McGehee | R/R | 6 ft 0 in (1.83 m) | 170 lb (77 kg) | Fr | Tioga | Tioga, LA |
| 51 | C | Hayden Scarbrough | R/R | 5 ft 11 in (1.8 m) | 180 lb (82 kg) | Jr | Corinth; Northeast Mississippi CC | Corinth, MS |
| 54 | INF | Tywone Malone Jr. | R/R | 6 ft 4 in (1.93 m) | 315 lb (143 kg) | Fr | Bergen Catholic | Jamesburg, NJ |
| 55 | RHP | Wes Burton | R/R | 6 ft 8 in (2.03 m) | 235 lb (107 kg) | Jr | Windward | Santa Monica, CA |
| 56 | RHP | Jack Washburn | R/R | 6 ft 2 in (1.88 m) | 211 lb (96 kg) | Jr | Webster; Oregon State | Webster, WI |

Head coach

Mike Bianco (LSU)

Assistant coach(es)

Mike Clement (Morningside)
Carl Lafferty (Ole Miss)

Legend

- (C) Team captain
- (S) Suspended
- (I) Ineligible
- Injured
- Current redshirt

Roster

== See also ==
- 2022 Ole Miss Rebels softball team
