= 2022 Missouri Tigers baseball team =

American college baseball season

2022 Missouri Tigers baseball
- Conference: Southeastern Conference
- Eastern Division
- Record: 28–23 (10–20 SEC)
- Head coach: Steve Bieser (6th season)
- Assistant coaches: Mitch Plassmeyer; Tyler Packanik; Jason Hagerty
- Home stadium: Taylor Stadium

2022 Southeastern Conference baseball standings
	Conf.				Overall
Team	W		L	PCT	W		L	PCT
Eastern
No. 9 Tennessee ^{x}‍†‍‡‍^{y}	25	–	5	.833	57	–	9	.864
No. 21 Florida ‍‍‍^{y}	15	–	15	.500	42	–	24	.636
Georgia ‍‍‍^{y}	15	–	15	.500	36	–	23	.610
Vanderbilt ‍‍‍^{y}	14	–	16	.467	39	–	23	.629
South Carolina ‍‍‍	13	–	17	.433	27	–	28	.491
Kentucky ‍‍‍	12	–	18	.400	33	–	26	.559
Missouri ‍‍‍	10	–	20	.333	28	–	23	.549
Western
No. 3 Texas A&M ^{x}‍‍‍^{y}	19	–	11	.633	44	–	20	.688
No. 4 Arkansas ‍‍‍^{y}	18	–	12	.600	46	–	21	.687
No. 25 LSU ‍‍‍^{y}	17	–	13	.567	40	–	22	.645
No. 7 Auburn ‍‍‍^{y}	16	–	13	.552	43	–	22	.662
No. 1 Ole Miss ‍‍‍^{y}	14	–	16	.467	42	–	23	.646
Alabama ‍‍‍	12	–	17	.414	31	–	27	.534
Mississippi State ‍‍‍	9	–	21	.300	26	–	30	.464
x – Division champion † – Conference champion ‡ – Tournament champion y – Invited to the NCAA tournament Rankings from D1Baseball

The 2022 Missouri Tigers baseball team represented the University of Missouri in the 2022 NCAA Division I baseball season. The Tigers played their home games at Taylor Stadium.

== Previous season ==
The Tigers finished 15–36, 8–22 in the SEC to finish in last place in the East division. They were not invited to the postseason.

=== 2021 MLB draft ===
The Tigers had one player drafted in the 2021 MLB draft.

Player	Position	Round	Overall	MLB Team
Seth Halvorsen	Pitcher	19	565	Philadelphia Phillies

== Personnel ==
=== Roster ===
2022 Missouri Tigers baseball team
Players
Coaches

#	Pos.	Name	B/T	Height	Weight	Year	Home town
1	OF	Juju Stevens	R/R	6 ft 0 in (1.83 m)	180 lb (82 kg)	Fr	Woodbridge, CT
2	C	Mike Coletta	R/R	5 ft 11 in (1.8 m)	200 lb (91 kg)	Sr	Flushing, NY
3	C	Tre Morris	R/R	5 ft 10 in (1.78 m)	190 lb (86 kg)	Sr	Columbia, MO
4	INF	Nander De Sedas	S/R	6 ft 2 in (1.88 m)	200 lb (91 kg)	Jr	Panama City, PR
5	INF	Josh Day	R/R	6 ft 2 in (1.88 m)	200 lb (91 kg)	Sr	Natchez, MS
6	INF	Dexter Swims	R/R	5 ft 10 in (1.78 m)	180 lb (82 kg)	Jr	St. Louis, MO
7	OF	Ross Lovich	L/L	6 ft 0 in (1.83 m)	170 lb (77 kg)	So	Overland Park, KS
8	P	Spencer Miles	R/R	6 ft 3 in (1.91 m)	180 lb (82 kg)	Jr	Columbia, MO
9		Ty Wilmsmeyer	R/R	6 ft 1 in (1.85 m)	185 lb (84 kg)	Jr	Springfield, MO
10	INF	Jackson Beaman	R/R	6 ft 1 in (1.85 m)	205 lb (93 kg)	So	Lincoln, MO
11		Luke Mann	L/R	6 ft 2 in (1.88 m)	200 lb (91 kg)	RS Jr	St. Louis, MO
12	INF	Justin Colon	R/R	6 ft 3 in (1.91 m)	170 lb (77 kg)	Fr	Carolina, PR
13	INF	Garrett Rice	R/R	6 ft 2 in (1.88 m)	240 lb (109 kg)	So	Willard, MO
14	OF	Isaiah Frost	L/L	5 ft 11 in (1.8 m)	190 lb (86 kg)	Fr	Lee's Summit, MO
17	P	Ben Pedersen	R/R	6 ft 6 in (1.98 m)	227 lb (103 kg)	So	Duluth, MN
18	C	Shea McGahan	R/R	6 ft 0 in (1.83 m)	185 lb (84 kg)	Fr	St. Louis, MO
19	INF	Trevor Austin	R/R	5 ft 10 in (1.78 m)	188 lb (85 kg)	So	Jefferson City, MO
20	P	Jacob Kush	R/R	5 ft 10 in (1.78 m)	175 lb (79 kg)	Sr	Guelph, ON
23	P	Ian Lohse	L/L	6 ft 0 in (1.83 m)	182 lb (83 kg)	So	St. Louis, MO
24	INF	Hector Mangual	R/R	6 ft 4 in (1.93 m)	180 lb (82 kg)	Fr	Río Grande, PR
25	P	Austin Troesser	R/R	6 ft 3 in (1.91 m)	160 lb (73 kg)	So	Loose Creek, MO
26	INF	Torin Montgomery	L/R	6 ft 3 in (1.91 m)	230 lb (104 kg)	Jr	Kirkland, WA
27	OF	Carlos Peña	L/R	6 ft 2 in (1.88 m)	215 lb (98 kg)	Fr	Bayside, NY
28	C	Garrison Bennett	R/R	5 ft 8 in (1.73 m)	162 lb (73 kg)	Jr	Green Oaks, IL
30	P	Carter Rustad	R/R	6 ft 4 in (1.93 m)	180 lb (82 kg)	So	Kansas City, MO
32	P	Drew Garrett	R/R	6 ft 6 in (1.98 m)	205 lb (93 kg)	Sr	Columbia, MO
35	P	Nathan Landry	L/L	6 ft 2 in (1.88 m)	200 lb (91 kg)	Jr	Quebec, CN
36	P	Parker Wright	R/R	6 ft 3 in (1.91 m)	208 lb (94 kg)	So	Columbia, MO
37	P	Holden Phelps	R/R	6 ft 5 in (1.96 m)	217 lb (98 kg)	So	Crystal Lake, IL
39	P	Shane Wilhelm	R/R	5 ft 10 in (1.78 m)	190 lb (86 kg)	Jr	Columbia, IL
41	P	Zach Hise	R/R	6 ft 5 in (1.96 m)	210 lb (95 kg)	So	Joliet, IL
42	INF	Fox Leum	L/R	6 ft 2 in (1.88 m)	230 lb (104 kg)	Gr	Excelsior, MN
43	P	Austin Marozas	R/R	6 ft 8 in (2.03 m)	230 lb (104 kg)	Jr	Plainfield, IL
44	P	Kyle Brown	R/R	5 ft 10 in (1.78 m)	180 lb (82 kg)	So	Columbia, MO
45	P	Christian Wall	L/L	6 ft 6 in (1.98 m)	230 lb (104 kg)	Gr	Wentzville, MO
47	P	Kyle Potthoff	R/R	6 ft 5 in (1.96 m)	190 lb (86 kg)	RS So	Chesterfield, MO
48	P	Trae Robertson	L/L	6 ft 5 in (1.96 m)	190 lb (86 kg)	Sr	Columbia, MO
49	P	Tony Neubeck	L/L	6 ft 2 in (1.88 m)	240 lb (109 kg)	Fr	Hugo, MN
51	P	Brenner Maloney	L/L	6 ft 2 in (1.88 m)	215 lb (98 kg)	RS So	Liberty, MO
52	P	Cameron Careswell	L/L	6 ft 2 in (1.88 m)	220 lb (100 kg)	Fr	Lee's Summit, MO
55	P	Austin Cheeley	R/R	6 ft 8 in (2.03 m)	250 lb (113 kg)	Sr	St. Louis, MO
56	P	Ray Schroeder	R/R	6 ft 3 in (1.91 m)	185 lb (84 kg)	Fr	Columbia, MO
57	P	Sam Bryan	R/R	6 ft 0 in (1.83 m)	175 lb (79 kg)	Fr	St. Louis, MO

Head coach

Steve Bieser

Assistant coach(es)

Mitch Plassmeyer
Tyler Packanik

Legend

- (C) Team captain
- (S) Suspended
- (I) Ineligible
- Injured
- Current redshirt

=== Coaching staff ===
2021 Missouri Tigers coaching staff
Name	Position
Steve Bieser	Head coach
Mitch Plassmeyer	Pitching Coach
Jason Hagerty	Hitting Coach
Tyler Packanik	Volunteer Assistant Coach
Justin Dedman	Graduate Assistant
Brian Sharp	Graduate Assistant

=== Transfers ===
Outgoing transfers
Name	No.	Pos.	Height	Weight	Hometown	Year	New school
Cameron Swanger	13	INF	6'5	210	Loveland, OH	Junior	St. Louis
Cameron Pferrer	42	P	5'11	182	Carmel, IN	Senior	St. Louis
Mark Vierling	9	INF	5'10	188	St. Louiss, MO	Senior	St. Louis
Alex Peterson	14	OF	5'10	185	Edmond, OK	Senior	St. Louis

Incoming transfers
Name	B/T	Pos.	Height	Weight	Hometown	Year	Previous school
Carter Rustad	R/R	P	6'4	180	Kansas City, MO	Sophomore	San Diego
Nander De Sedas	S/R	INF	6'2	200	Panama City, Panama	Junior	Florida State
Fox Leum	L/R	INF	6'2	230	Excelsior, MN	Graduate Student	Coastal Carolina
Chris Wall	L/L	P	6'6	230	Wentzville, MO	Graduate Student	Columbia College
Austin Cheeley	R/R	P	6'8	250	St. Louis, MO	Senior	Middle Tennessee
Dexter Swims	R/R	INF	5'10	180	St. Louis, MO	Junior	Missouri Southern
Austin Marozas	R/R	P	6'8	230	Plainfield, IL	Junior	Charlotte

== Schedule and results ==
2022 Missouri Tigers baseball game log
Regular season (28–23)

February (6–1)
Date	Opponent	Rank	Site/stadium	Score	Win	Loss	Save	TV	Attendance	Overall record	SEC record
February 18	at Nicholls*		Ray E. Didier Field; Thibodaux, LA	**W** 12–17	**Miles** (1–0)	Saltaformaggio (0–1)	**Potthoff** (1)		344	1–0	
February 19	at Nicholls*		Ray E. Didier Field	**W** 14–27	**Troesser** (1–0)	Theriot (0–1)	**Landry** (1)		301	2–0	
February 20	at Nicholls*		Ray E. Didier Field	**L** 8–9	Gearing (1–0)	**Neubeck** (0–1)			401	2–1	
February 21	at Nicholls*		Ray E. Didier Field	**W** 7–4	**Cheeley** (1–0)	Keith (0–1)			278	3–1	
February 23	at Southern*		Lee–Hines Field; Baton Rouge, LA	**W** 19–8	**Landry** (1–0)	Banks (0–1)			376	4–1	
February 25	at Louisiana–Monroe*		Warhawk Field; Monroe, LA	**W** 4–3	**Neubeck** (1–1)	Wepf (1–1)	**Cheeley** (1)		1,072	5−1	
February 26	at Louisiana–Monroe*		Warhawk Field	**Canceled (Rain out)**							
February 27	at Louisiana–Monroe*		Warhawk Field	**W** 4–2	**Troesser** (2–0)	Jans (0–2)	**Cheeley** (2)		1,013	6–1	

March (9–6)
Date	Opponent	Rank	Site/stadium	Score	Win	Loss	Save	TV	Attendance	Overall record	SEC record
March 4	Tarleton State*		Taylor Stadium; Columbia, MO	**W** 6–5	**Miles** (2–0)	Hackett (0–3)	**Cheeley** (3)		1,210	7–1	
March 5	Tarleton State*		Taylor Stadium	**W** 9–1	**Troesser** (3–0)	Mentzel (0–3)			871	8–1	
March 6	Tarleton State*		Taylor Stadium	**W** 11–6	**Rustad** (1–0)	Adams (2–1)			636	9–1	
March 9	No. 25 Gonzaga*		Taylor Stadium	**L** 5–10	Zeglin (1–0)	**Lohse** (0–1)			474	9–2	
March 11	Gonzaga*		Taylor Stadium	**Canceled (Inclement weather)**							
March 12	Gonzaga*		Taylor Stadium	**Canceled (Inclement weather)**							
March 12	San Francisco*		Phoenix Municipal Stadium; Phoenix, AZ	**W** 4–1	**Neubeck** (2–1)	Ornido (0–1)	**Cheeley** (4)			10–2	
March 13	Gonzaga*		Taylor Stadium	**Canceled (Inclement weather)**							
March 13	Arizona State*		Phoenix Municipal Stadium	**W** 6–2	**Rustad** (2–0)	Webster (0–2)	**Loshe** (1)		4,942	11–2	
March 15	Saint Louis*		Taylor Stadium	**W** 18–47	**Kush** (1–0)	Holmes (0–1)		SECN+	847	12–2	
March 18	at No. 4 Vanderbilt		Hawkins Field; Nashville, TN	**L** 2–15	McElvain (3–0)	**Miles** (2–1)		SECN+	3,802	12–3	0–1
March 19	at No. 4 Vanderbilt		Hawkins Field	**L** 0–6	Holton (4–0)	**Wall** (0–1)		SECN+	3,802	12–4	0–2
March 20	at No. 4 Vanderbilt		Hawkins Field	**L** 4–7	Berkwich (1–0)	**Landry** (1–1)	Schultz (4)	SECN+	3,802	12–5	0–3
March 25	No. 3 Arkansas		Taylor Stadium	**L** 5–7	Vermillion (2–0)	**Landry** (1–2)	Tygart (3)	SECN+	852	12–6	0–4
March 26	No. 3 Arkansas		Taylor Stadium	**W** 7–5	**Lohse** (1–1)	Trest (0–1)		SECN	907	13–6	1–4
March 27	No. 3 Arkansas		Taylor Stadium	**L** 4–6	Wiggins (4–0)	**Wall** (0–2)	Tygart (4)	SECN+	1,127	13–7	1–5
March 29	vs. Illinois*		GCS Ballpark; Sauget, IL	**W** 11–7	**Kush** (2–0)	Kutt (0–2)			4,681	14–7	
March 30	SIU Edwardsville*		Taylor Stadium	**W** 12–27	**Wall** (1–2)	Rogers (0–1)	**Potthoff** (2)	SECN+	212	15–7	

April (8–10)
Date	Opponent	Rank	Site/stadium	Score	Win	Loss	Save	TV	Attendance	Overall record	SEC record
April 1	South Carolina		Taylor Stadium	**L** 1–4	Hall (1–4)	**Miles** (2–2)	Austin (2)	SECN+	831	15–8	1–6
April 2	South Carolina		Taylor Stadium	**W** 8–7	**Landry** (2–2)	Brawell (1–2)		SECN+	1,237	16–8	2–6
April 3	South Carolina		Taylor Stadium	**W** 10–3	**Marozas** (1–0)	Becker (1–2)	**Rustad** (1)	SECN+	1,064	17–8	3–6
April 6	Kansas*		Taylor Stadium	**W** 14–6	**Landry** (3–2)	Adams (2–1)		SECN	3,031	18–8	
April 8	at No. 1 Tennessee		Lindsey Nelson Stadium; Knoxville, TN	**L** 3–8	McLaughlin (1–0)	**Rustad** (2–1)		SECN+	4,031	18–9	3–7
April 9	at No. 1 Tennessee		Lindsey Nelson Stadium	**L** 4–11	Dollander (6–0)	**Cheeley** (1–1)		SECN	4,249	18–10	3–8
April 10	at No. 1 Tennessee		Lindsey Nelson Stadium	**L** 3–4	Beam (7–0)	**Marozas** (1–1)	Walsh (5)	SECN+	4,327	18–11	3–9
April 12	Western Illinois*		Taylor Stadium	**W** 9–1	**Phelps** (1–0)	Armstrong (0–1)		SECN+	642	19–11	
April 14	Kentucky		Taylor Stadium	**L** 6–15	Hazelwood (1–0)	**Miles** (2–3)	Hagenow (1)	ESPNU	931	19–12	3–10
April 15	Kentucky		Taylor Stadium	**W** 9–4	**Neubeck** (4–9)	Harney (4–3)		SECN+	1,011	20–12	4–10
April 16	Kentucky		Taylor Stadium	**W** 10–6	**Rustad** (3–1)	Guilfoil (0–1)		SECN	1,231	21–12	5–10
April 19	Missouri State*		Taylor Stadium	**W** 6–5	**Wall** (2–2)	Lang (0–2)	**Loshe** (2)	SECN+	1,317	22–12	
April 21	at No. 22 LSU		Alex Box Stadium; Baton Rouge, LA	**L** 3–5	Hilliard (4–0)	**Miles** (2–4)	Gervase (3)	ESPNU	10,287	22–13	5–11
April 22	at No. 22 LSU		Alex Box Stadium	**L** 3–410	Cooper (3–2)	**Troesser** (3–1)		SECN+	10,919	22–14	5–12
April 23	at No. 22 LSU		Alex Box Stadium	**L** 6–8	Collins (2–0)	**Marozas** (1–2)	Cooper (1)	SECN+	10,288	22–15	5–13
April 26	at Missouri State*		Hammons Field; Springfield, MO	**L** 2–3	McMahill (1–1)	**Lohse** (1–2)			2,007	22–16	
April 29	Mississippi State		Taylor Stadium	**L** 4–13	Smith (3–3)	**Neubeck** (3–2)		SECN+	1,472	22–17	5–14
April 30	Mississippi State		Taylor Stadium	**W** 19–8	**Miles** (3–4)	Johnson (3–3)	**Marozas** (1)	SECN+	2,336	23–17	6–14

May (5–6)
Date	Opponent	Rank	Site/stadium	Score	Win	Loss	Save	TV	Attendance	Overall record	SEC record
May 1	Mississippi State		Taylor Stadium	**W** 7–6	**Lohse** (2–2)	Hunt (2–2)		SECN	1,467	24–17	7–14
May 3	Southeast Missouri State*		Taylor Stadium	**W** 9–3	**Kush** (3–0)	Wilma (0–1)	**Cheeley** (5)	SECN+	884	25–17	
May 6	at Ole Miss		Swayze Field; Oxford, MS	**L** 5–7	Dougherty (2–3)	**Troesser** (3–2)	Johnson (6)		9,176	25–18	7–15
May 7	at Ole Miss		Swayze Field	**L** 1–8	Elliott (2–3)	**Miles** (3–5)			9,295	25–19	7–16
May 8	at Ole Miss		Swayze Field	**L** 2–10	Diamond (4–4)	**Marozas** (1–3)			8,929	25–20	7–17
May 13	Florida		Taylor Stadium	**L** 1–13	Sproat (7–4)	**Neubeck** (3–3)		SECN+	1,039	25–21	7–18
May 14	Florida		Taylor Stadium	**W** 5–3	**Miles** (4–5)	Neely (2–1)	**Lohse** (3)	SECN+	1,526	26–21	8–18
May 15	Florida		Taylor Stadium	**L** 3–4	Pogue (3–2)	**Rustad** (3–2)	Slater (4)	SECN+	1,026	26–22	8–19
May 17	at Kansas*		Hoglund Ballpark; Lawrence, KS	**Canceled (Rain out)**							
May 19	at Georgia		Foley Field; Athens, GA	**W** 11–3	**Miles** (5–5)	Marsh (3–1)		SECN+	2,910	27–22	9–19
May 20	at Georgia		Foley Field	**W** 10–3	**Landry** (4–2)	Cannon (9–3)		SECN+	3,204	28–22	10–19
May 21	at Georgia		Foley Field	**L** 10–11	Marsh (4–1)	**Marozas** (1–4)		SECN+	2,883	28–23	10–20

Legend: = Win = Loss = Canceled
Bold = Missouri team member
Rankings are based on the team's current ranking in the D1Baseball poll.

== Player statistics ==
=== Batting ===
Individual player statistics (Final)
Player	GS	GP	AB	R	H	2B	3B	HR	RBI	BB	SO	SB	AVG	OB%	SLG	OPS
Austin, Trevor	50	50	145	50	67	8	0	6	22	19	32	3	.297	.417	.476	.893
Beaman, Jackson	0	13	11	1	1	0	0	1	3	1	2	0	.091	.167	.364	.531
Bennett, Garrison	0	3	1	2	1	0	0	0	1	1	0	0	1.000	1.000	1.000	2.000
Careswell, Cam	3	8	19	2	5	3	0	0	3	2	9	0	.263	.333	.421	.754
Coletta, Mike	26	34	95	10	25	3	0	0	13	12	26	1	.263	.346	.295	.641
Colon, Justin	6	20	34	11	10	3	1	2	6	5	6	1	.294	.385	.618	1.003
Day, Josh	50	50	197	50	67	10	1	7	29	20	47	9	.340	.435	.508	.943
De Sedas, Nander	37	43	133	24	37	7	1	2	26	15	39	3	.278	.373	.391	.764
Frost, Isaiah	0	13	7	3	0	0	0	0	0	3	3	0	.000	.300	.000	.300
Leum, Fox	35	40	125	27	33	4	0	8	28	23	48	2	.264	.400	.488	.888
Lovich, Ross	43	48	154	30	40	6	0	5	30	14	33	12	.260	.357	.396	.753
Mangual, Hector	2	10	15	3	4	1	0	0	3	4	3	0	.267	.421	.333	.754
Mann, Luke	50	50	185	48	50	7	1	17	43	28	56	6	.270	.401	.595	.996
McGahan, Shea	0	6	4	1	2	0	0	1	4	2	2	0	.500	.667	1.250	1.917
Montgomery, Torin	49	49	181	44	66	12	0	7	49	21	37	4	.365	.462	.547	1.009
Morris, Tre	28	36	119	15	29	8	0	1	17	7	9	2	.244	.300	.336	.636
Peña, Carlos	29	34	110	13	23	5	1	2	20	13	40	3	.209	.290	.327	.617
Rice, Garrett	6	15	19	2	4	1	0	0	3	6	4	0	.211	.444	.263	.707
Stevens, JuJu	3	6	12	2	6	0	0	0	4	1	2	1	.500	.538	.500	1.038
Swims, Dexter	0	4	4	2	1	0	0	0	3	1	0	0	.250	.333	.250	.583
Wilmsmeyer, Ty	51	51	183	31	50	6	0	3	21	12	42	8	.273	.332	.355	.687
Total	51	-	1753	356	497	84	5	62	328	210	440	55	.284	.384	.443	.827

=== Pitching ===
Individual player statistics (Final)
Player	W	L	ERA	G	GS	SV	IP	H	R	ER	BB	K
Brown, Kyle	0	0	5.65	12	0	0	14.1	17	9	9	3	7
Cheeley, Austin	1	1	6.18	23	0	5	27.2	35	21	19	12	21
Garrett, Drew	0	0	9.64	4	1	0	4.2	5	7	5	7	6
Kush, Jacob	3	0	8.57	12	1	0	21.0	22	20	20	15	19
Landry, Nathan	4	2	3.67	15	4	1	41.2	31	20	17	7	54
Lohse, Ian	2	2	3.80	17	0	3	23.2	14	11	10	17	31
Maloney, Brenner	0	0	0.00	1	0	0	0.2	0	1	0	2	2
Marozas, Austin	1	4	8.52	12	9	1	43.1	55	44	41	22	33
Miles, Spencer	5	5	6.20	13	13	0	69.2	90	49	48	23	67
Neubeck, Tony	3	3	5.63	15	9	0	54.1	52	40	34	29	60
Phelps, Holden	1	0	4.05	6	1	0	6.2	8	5	3	8	10
Pothoff, Kyle	0	0	5.40	5	0	2	10.0	11	6	6	2	9
Robertson, Trae	0	0	5.11	10	0	0	12.1	13	7	7	6	12
Rustad, Carter	3	2	4.73	16	3	1	51.1	50	29	27	15	42
Troesser, Austin	3	2	3.64	13	7	0	29.2	25	12	12	17	22
Wall, Christian	2	2	4.78	17	3	0	26.1	24	19	14	23	33
Wilhelm, Shane	0	0	0.00	1	0	0	1.0	1	1	0	1	0
Total	28	23	5.58	51	51	13	438.1	453	301	272	209	428

== Awards and honors ==
=== In-season awards ===
==== Fox Leum ====
- SEC Player of the Week for the week of March 28, 2022

=== Postseason awards ===
==== Josh Day ====
- All-SEC Second Team

== Rankings ==
Ranking movements Legend: RV = Received votes
	Week																		
Poll	Pre	1	2	3	4	5	6	7	8	9	10	11	12	13	14	15	16	17	Final
Coaches'		*	RV	RV	RV														
Baseball America																			
NCBWA†				RV	RV														

† NCBWA ranks 30 teams in their preseason poll, but only ranks 25 teams weekly during the season.
* A new poll was not released for this week, so for comparison purposes, the previous week's ranking is inserted in this week's slot.
