= Eric Reyzelman =

American baseball player (born 2001)

New York Yankees
- Pitcher
- Born: June 27, 2001 (age 24); San Ramon, California, U.S.
- Bats: Right Throws: Right
- Stats at Baseball Reference

Eric Michael Reyzelman (born June 27, 2001) is an American professional baseball pitcher in the New York Yankees organization.

== Early life ==
Reyzelman's parents immigrated to the United States from the Soviet Union; his father, Alex, moved to the United States from Moldova in 1986, and his mother, Victoria, came from Ukraine in 1989. He and his family are Jewish. Reyzelman grew up in San Ramon, California, with two brothers, one of whom played college football at Fresno State University. He grew up as a fan of pitcher Tim Lincecum and the San Francisco Giants of Major League Baseball (MLB).

== Amateur career ==
Reyzelman attended De La Salle High School in Concord, California. He played for the school's baseball team in his freshman and senior years, but was cut from the team in his sophomore and junior years. His parents suggested that he give up on baseball and focus on academics, but Reyzelman decided to try again. After his junior year, he began weightlifting, and his fastball velocity increased to 88 to 89 miles per hour (142 to 143 km/h). As a senior, he had an 8–0 win–loss record and a 0.55 earned run average (ERA).

Reyzelman enrolled at the University of San Francisco, where he played college baseball for the San Francisco Dons for two seasons. He had a 5–4 win–loss record and a 5.72 ERA, but also averaged 10 strikeouts per nine innings pitched. He had Tommy John surgery in March 2020, and returned to the Dons in 2021. After the 2021 college season, Reyzelman played collegiate summer baseball for the Harwich Mariners of the Cape Cod Baseball League (CCBL), where he posted a 2.66 ERA and 36 strikeouts in 23 2/3 innings, and was named a league all-star. He transferred to Louisiana State University (LSU) to play for the LSU Tigers for the 2022 season, and recorded 66 strikeouts in 42 1/3 innings pitched, averaging 13.7 strikeouts per 9 innings pitched. Reyzelman returned to Harwich in the summer of 2022 and was 1–1 with a 1.69 ERA.

== Professional career ==
The New York Yankees selected Reyzelman in the fifth round, with the 160th overall selection, of the 2022 MLB draft. He signed with the Yankees for a $340,700 signing bonus. Reyzelman missed most of the 2023 season due to a cyst in his lower back that required three surgeries to correct.

In the 2024 season, Reyzelman pitched at three different levels of Minor League Baseball, combining for a 1.16 ERA, an 0.96 WHIP, and 63 strikeouts in 38 2/3 innings (14.7 strikeouts per 9 innings pitched), finishing the season with the Somerset Patriots of the Double-A Eastern League. His fastball velocity increased to 95 to 99 miles per hour (153 to 159 km/h). He also threw an 82 to 85 miles per hour (132 to 137 km/h) slider as well as a changeup, both of which regularly fooled batters.

In 2025, the Yankees invited Reyzelman to spring training as a non-roster player.
