= 2022 College Baseball All-America Team =

This is a list of college baseball players named first team All-Americans for the 2022 NCAA Division I baseball season. From 2019 to 2023, there were seven generally recognized All-America selectors for baseball: the American Baseball Coaches Association, Baseball America, Collegiate Baseball Newspaper, the College Baseball Foundation, D1Baseball.com, the National Collegiate Baseball Writers Association, and Perfect Game. In order to be considered a "consensus" All-American, a player must have been selected by at least four of these.

== Key ==
A	American Baseball Coaches Association
B	Baseball America
C	Collegiate Baseball Newspaper
F	College Baseball Foundation
D	D1Baseball.com
N	National Collegiate Baseball Writers Association
P	Perfect Game
	Member of the National College Baseball Hall of Fame
	Consensus All-American – selected by all seven organizations
	Consensus All-American – selected by four, five, or six organizations

== All-Americans ==
Position	Name	School	#	A	B	C	F	D	N	P	Other awards and honors
Starting pitcher	John Michael Bertrand	Notre Dame	1	—	—	—	✓	—	—	—	
Starting pitcher	Chase Burns	Tennessee	1	—	—	—	—	—	✓	—	
Starting pitcher	Justin Campbell	Oklahoma State	1	—	—	—	—	—	✓	—	
Starting pitcher	Chase Dollander	Tennessee	6	✓	—	✓	✓	✓	✓	✓	
Starting pitcher	Tanner Hall	Southern Miss	5	✓	✓	✓	—	✓	—	✓	
Starting pitcher	Thomas Harrington	Campbell	2	✓	—	—	—	✓	—	—	
Starting pitcher	Cooper Hjerpe	Oregon State	7	✓	✓	✓	✓	✓	✓	✓	ABCA Pitcher of the Year National Pitcher of the Year
Starting pitcher	Gabriel Hughes	Gonzaga	2	—	—	✓	—	—	—	✓	
Starting pitcher	Rhett Lowder	Wake Forest	2	✓	✓	—	—	—	—	—	
Starting pitcher	Parker Messick	Florida State	1	—	—	—	—	—	✓	—	
Starting pitcher	Austin Peterson	UConn	1	—	—	—	—	—	✓	—	
Starting pitcher	Drew Thorpe	Cal Poly	6	✓	✓	✓	—	✓	✓	✓	
Starting pitcher	Alex Williams	Stanford	2	—	—	✓	✓	—	—	—	
Relief pitcher	Will Brian	Western Kentucky	1	—	—	—	—	—	✓	—	
Relief pitcher	Jack Gowen	Georgia	2	—	—	—	✓	—	✓	—	
Relief pitcher	Tyler Guilfoil	Kentucky	3	—	✓	—	—	—	✓	✓	
Relief pitcher	William Privette	Charleston	1	—	—	—	✓	—	—	—	
Relief pitcher	Tristan Stivors	Texas State	5	✓	—	✓	✓	✓	✓	—	Stopper of the Year
Relief pitcher	Andrew Walters	Miami (FL)	4	—	✓	—	—	✓	✓	✓	
Catcher	Kevin Parada	Georgia Tech	7	✓	✓	✓	✓	✓	✓	✓	Buster Posey Award Johnny Bench Award
First baseman / DH	Sonny DiChiara	Auburn	4	✓	✓	—	—	✓	—	✓	
First baseman	Ivan Melendez	Texas	7	✓	✓	✓	✓	✓	✓	✓	Dick Howser Trophy Golden Spikes Award ABCA Position Player of the Year Baseball America Player of the Year Collegiate Baseball Player of the Year
Second baseman	Mario Camilletti	Central Michigan	1	✓	—	—	—	—	—	—	
Second baseman	Jace Jung	Texas Tech	5	—	✓	—	✓	✓	✓	✓	
Second baseman	Harrison Spohn	California Baptist	1	—	—	✓	—	—	—	—	
Shortstop	Peyton Graham	Oklahoma	3	—	✓	—	—	✓	✓	—	
Shortstop	Brooks Lee	Cal Poly	3	✓	—	✓	✓	—	—	—	Brooks Wallace Award
Shortstop	Zach Neto	Campbell	1	—	—	—	—	—	—	✓	
Shortstop	Taylor Young	Louisiana Tech	1	✓	—	—	—	—	—	—	
Third baseman	Trey Lipscomb	Tennessee	2	—	—	—	✓	—	✓	—	
Third baseman	Max Wagner	Clemson	6	✓	✓	✓	—	✓	✓	✓	
Outfielder	Chris Alleyne	Maryland	5	✓	✓	✓	✓	—	✓	—	
Outfielder	Enrique Bradfield	Vanderbilt	1	—	—	—	—	—	✓	—	
Outfielder	Carlos Contreras	Sam Houston	1	✓	—	—	—	—	—	—	
Outfielder	Dylan Crews	LSU	7	✓	✓	✓	✓	✓	✓	✓	
Outfielder	Gavin Cross	Virginia Tech	1	—	—	—	—	—	—	✓	
Outfielder	Drew Gilbert	Tennessee	1	—	—	—	—	—	✓	—	
Outfielder	Wyatt Langford	Florida	1	—	—	—	—	✓	—	—	
Outfielder	Jacob Melton	Oregon State	7	✓	✓	✓	✓	✓	✓	✓	
Designated hitter	Tommy White	NC State	4	✓	—	✓	✓	—	✓	—	
Utility player	Paul Skenes	Air Force	7	✓	✓	✓	✓	✓	✓	✓	John Olerud Award

== See also ==
- List of college baseball awards
