= 2022 Southeastern Conference baseball season =

- League: Southeastern Conference
- Sport: Baseball
- Teams: 14

Regular Season
- East champions: Tennessee
- West champions: Texas A&M

Tournament
- Champions: Tennessee
- Runners-up: Florida
- Finals MVP: Drew Gilbert

Seasons
- ← 2021 2023 →

The 2022 Southeastern Conference baseball season was the baseball season for the Southeastern Conference as part of the 2022 NCAA Division I baseball season. Tennessee and Texas A&M won the East and West Division regular season titles respectively. In the conference tournament, Tennessee defeated Florida 8–5 in the final to be crowned SEC champions.

== Regular season ==
The Southeastern Conference released the regular season conference schedule on September 15, 2021. The regular season began March 18 and concluded May 21.

=== Division standings ===
East Division
Pos	Team	Pld	CW	CL	CPCT	GB	W	L	PCT	Qualification
1	y – Tennessee	66	25	5	.833	—	57	9	.864	Qualification for the second round & NCAA tournament
2	Georgia	59	15	15	.500	10	36	23	.610	Qualification for the first round & NCAA tournament
3	Florida	66	15	15	.500	10	42	24	.636	Qualification for the first round & NCAA tournament
4	Vanderbilt	62	14	16	.467	11	39	23	.629	Qualification for the first round & NCAA tournament
5	South Carolina	55	13	17	.433	12	27	28	.491	Qualification for the first round
6	Kentucky	59	12	18	.400	13	33	26	.559	Qualification for the first round
7	Missouri	51	10	20	.333	15	28	23	.549	

Source: SEC
y – Division champion

West Division
Pos	Team	Pld	CW	CL	CPCT	GB	W	L	PCT	Qualification
1	y – Texas A&M	64	19	11	.633	—	44	20	.688	Qualification for the second round & NCAA tournament
2	Arkansas	67	18	12	.600	1	46	21	.687	Qualification for the second round & NCAA tournament
3	LSU	62	17	13	.567	2	40	22	.645	Qualification for the second round & NCAA tournament
4	Auburn	65	16	13	.552	2.5	43	22	.662	Qualification for the first round & NCAA tournament
5	Ole Miss	65	14	16	.467	5	42	23	.646	Qualification for the first round & NCAA tournament
6	Alabama	58	12	17	.414	6.5	31	27	.534	Qualification for the first round
7	Mississippi State	56	9	21	.300	10	26	30	.464	

Source: SEC
y – Division champion

=== Conference standings ===
Pos	Div	Team	Pld	CW	CL	CPCT	GB	W	L	PCT	Qualification
1	E	Tennessee (C)	66	25	5	.833	—	57	9	.864	Qualification for the second round & NCAA tournament
2	W	Texas A&M	64	19	11	.633	6	44	20	.688	Qualification for the second round & NCAA tournament
3	W	Arkansas	67	18	12	.600	7	46	21	.687	Qualification for the second round & NCAA tournament
4	W	LSU	62	17	13	.567	8	40	22	.645	Qualification for the second round & NCAA tournament
5	W	Auburn	65	16	13	.552	8.5	43	22	.662	Qualification for the first round & NCAA tournament
6	E	Georgia	59	15	15	.500	10	36	23	.610	Qualification for the first round & NCAA tournament
7	E	Florida	66	15	15	.500	10	42	24	.636	Qualification for the first round & NCAA tournament
8	E	Vanderbilt	62	14	16	.467	11	39	23	.629	Qualification for the first round & NCAA tournament
9	W	Ole Miss	65	14	16	.467	11	42	23	.646	Qualification for the first round & NCAA tournament
10	E	South Carolina	55	13	17	.433	12	27	28	.491	Qualification for the first round
11	W	Alabama	58	12	17	.414	12.5	31	27	.534	Qualification for the first round
12	E	Kentucky	59	12	18	.400	13	33	26	.559	Qualification for the first round
13	E	Missouri	51	10	20	.333	15	28	23	.549	
14	W	Mississippi State	56	9	21	.300	16	26	30	.464	

Source: SEC
(C) Champion

=== Results ===
Home \ Away	ALA	ARK	AUB	UF	UGA	UK	LSU	MISS	MSST	MIZZ	SC	TENN	TAMU	VAN
Alabama		2–1		1–2	1–2		1–2						2–1	
Arkansas						3–0	3–0	2–1	2–1					1–2
Auburn	2–0	1–2						1–2			3–0			2–1
Florida		2–1				2–1	1–2				2–1	0–3		
Georgia				3–0					2–1	1–2			1–2	1–2
Kentucky			2–1		2–1			1–2				2–1		1–2
LSU			1–2		2–1			0–3	3–0				1–2	
Ole Miss	0–3								1–2	3–0		0–3	1–2	
Mississippi State	2–1		2–1	0–3			0–3					0–3		
Missouri		1–2		1–2		2–1			2–1		2–1			
South Carolina	3–0				1–2	2–1		2–1						2–1
Tennessee	2–1		2–1		2–1					3–0	3–0			
Texas A&M		1–2	1–2			2–1			3–0		2–1			
Vanderbilt				2–1			0–3			3–0		0–3	1–2	

Source: SEC
Legend: Blue = home team win; Red = away team win.

== Tournament ==
The 2022 Southeastern Conference baseball tournament was held from May 24 through May 29 at Hoover Metropolitan Stadium in Hoover, Alabama. Tennessee won the conference tournament for the first time since 1995.

=== Bracket ===
First round
May 24
6	Georgia	3
11	Alabama	5
May 24
7	Florida	2
10	South Carolina	1^{10}
May 24
8	Vanderbilt	3
9	Ole Miss	1
May 25
5	Auburn	1
12	Kentucky	3

Second round
May 25
3	Arkansas	3
11	Alabama	4
May 26
2	Texas A&M	10
7	Florida	0^{7}
May 27
3	Arkansas	5
7	Florida	7
May 26
1	Tennessee	10
8	Vanderbilt	1
May 26
4	LSU	11
12	Kentucky	6
May 27
8	Vanderbilt	2
12	Kentucky	10

Third round
May 27
11	Alabama	8
2	Texas A&M	12
May 28
11	Alabama	6
7	Florida	11
May 27
1	Tennessee	5
4	LSU	2
May 28
4	LSU	2
12	Kentucky	7

Semifinals
May 28
2	Texas A&M	0
7	Florida	9
May 28
1	Tennessee	12
12	Kentucky	2

Final
May 29
7	Florida	5
1	Tennessee	8

== NCAA Tournament ==
Nine SEC teams were selected for the NCAA tournament, with four being selected as regional hosts. Auburn, Florida, Tennessee, and Texas A&M were national seeds and hosted their respective regionals, while Arkansas, Georgia, LSU, Ole Miss, and Vanderbilt also were selected to the tournament. Six of the nine teams advanced to a regional final, with five advancing to the super regional round.

Texas A&M, Ole Miss, Auburn and Arkansas were four of the eight teams to advance to the 2022 College World Series in Omaha. Ultimately, Ole Miss swept Oklahoma in two games to claim the national championship.

== Conference leaders ==
Hitting leaders
Stat	Player	Total
AVG	Sonny DiChiara (AUB)	.383
HR	Wyatt Langford (UF)	26
RBI	Trey Lipscomb (TENN)	84
R	Wyatt Langford (UF); Dylan Crews (LSU)	73
H	Jack Moss (TAMU)	103
SB	Enrique Bradfield (VAN)	46

Pitching leaders
Stat	Player	Total
W	Chase Dollander (TENN)	10
L	Connor Noland (ARK)	6
ERA	Chase Dollander (TENN)	2.39
K	Preston Johnson (MSST)	117
IP	Connor Noland (ARK)	116.0
SV	Blake Burkhalter (AUB)	16

== Awards and honors ==
=== SEC Baseball Awards ===
Award	Winner	Pos.	Team
Co-Players of the Year	Dylan Crews, So.	OF	LSU
Co-Players of the Year	Sonny DiChiara Sr.	1B	Auburn
Pitcher of the Year	Chase Dollander, So.	RHP	Tennessee
Freshman of the Year	Drew Beam, Fr.	RHP	Tennessee
Scholar Athlete of the Year	Ben Anderson, Gr.	OF	Georgia
Coach of the Year	Tony Vitello	HC	Tennessee

Source: SEC

== See also ==
- 2022 in baseball
