= 2022 Alabama Crimson Tide baseball team =

American college baseball season

2022 Alabama Crimson Tide baseball
- Conference: Southeastern Conference
- Western Division
- Record: 31–27 (12–17 SEC)
- Head coach: Brad Bohannon (5th season)
- Assistant coaches: Jason Jackson; Matt Reida
- Home stadium: Sewell–Thomas Stadium

2022 Southeastern Conference baseball standings
	Conf.				Overall
Team	W		L	PCT	W		L	PCT
Eastern
No. 9 Tennessee ^{x}‍†‍‡‍^{y}	25	–	5	.833	57	–	9	.864
No. 21 Florida ‍‍‍^{y}	15	–	15	.500	42	–	24	.636
Georgia ‍‍‍^{y}	15	–	15	.500	36	–	23	.610
Vanderbilt ‍‍‍^{y}	14	–	16	.467	39	–	23	.629
South Carolina ‍‍‍	13	–	17	.433	27	–	28	.491
Kentucky ‍‍‍	12	–	18	.400	33	–	26	.559
Missouri ‍‍‍	10	–	20	.333	28	–	23	.549
Western
No. 3 Texas A&M ^{x}‍‍‍^{y}	19	–	11	.633	44	–	20	.688
No. 4 Arkansas ‍‍‍^{y}	18	–	12	.600	46	–	21	.687
No. 25 LSU ‍‍‍^{y}	17	–	13	.567	40	–	22	.645
No. 7 Auburn ‍‍‍^{y}	16	–	13	.552	43	–	22	.662
No. 1 Ole Miss ‍‍‍^{y}	14	–	16	.467	42	–	23	.646
Alabama ‍‍‍	12	–	17	.414	31	–	27	.534
Mississippi State ‍‍‍	9	–	21	.300	26	–	30	.464
x – Division champion † – Conference champion ‡ – Tournament champion y – Invited to the NCAA tournament Rankings from D1Baseball

The 2022 Alabama Crimson Tide baseball team represented the University of Alabama in the 2022 NCAA Division I baseball season. The Crimson Tide played their home games at Sewell–Thomas Stadium.

== Previous season ==
The Crimson Tide finished 32–26, 12–17 in the SEC to finish in fifth place in the West division. They were invited to the Ruston Regional where they finished 1–2.

== Schedule and results ==
2022 Alabama Crimson Tide baseball game log (31–27)
Regular season (29–25)

February (5–3)
Date	Opponent	Rank	Site/stadium	Score	Win	Loss	Save	TV	Attendance	Overall record	SEC record
February 18	Xavier		Sewell–Thomas Stadium; Tuscaloosa, AL	**W** 5–4	**Guffey (1–0)**	Flamm (0–1)	—	SECN+	2,975	1–0	—
February 19	Xavier		Sewell–Thomas Stadium	**W** 5–4	**Furtado (1–0)**	Barnett (0–1)	**Guffey (1)**	SECN+	3,673	2–0	—
February 20	Xavier		Sewell–Thomas Stadium	**W** 9–4	**Hitt (1–0)**	Eisenhardt (0–1)	—	SECN+	3,154	3–0	—
February 22	Jacksonville State		Sewell–Thomas Stadium	**W** 6–3	**McNairy (1–0)**	Peppers (0–1)	**Hoopes (1)**	SECN+	2,247	4–0	—
February 23	Alabama State		Sewell–Thomas Stadium	**W** 9–2	**Ruth (1–0)**	Palmer (0–1)	—	SECN+	2,292	5–0	—
February 25	at #1 Texas		UFCU Disch–Falk Field; Austin, TX	**L** 0–1	Sthele (1–0)	**Ray (0–1)**	Nixon (2)	LHN	6,361	5–1	—
February 26	at #1 Texas		UFCU Disch–Falk Field	**L** 0–2	Stevens (2–0)	**Antoine (0–1)**	Harrison (1)	LHN	6,509	5–2	—
February 27	at #1 Texas		UFCU Disch–Falk Field	**L** 1–6	Witt (2–0)	**Holman (0–1)**	—	LHN	7,160	5–3	—

March (10–8)
Date	Opponent	Rank	Site/stadium	Score	Win	Loss	Save	TV	Attendance	Overall record	SEC record
March 1	UT Martin		Sewell–Thomas Stadium	**L** 6–7	Dickey (1–1)	**Furtado (1–1)**	Davis (2)	SECN+	2,411	5–4	—
March 2	Troy		Sewell–Thomas Stadium	**W** 8–1	**McNairy (2–0)**	Stewart (1–1)	—	SECN+	2,719	6–4	—
March 4	Murray State		Sewell–Thomas Stadium	**W** 5–1	**McMillan (1–0)**	Wynja (0–1)	—	SECN+	3,357	7–4	—
March 5	Murray State		Sewell–Thomas Stadium	**W** 6–1	**Furtado (2–1)**	Vernon (1–1)	—	SECN+	3,421	8–4	—
March 6	Murray State		Sewell–Thomas Stadium	**W** 5–4	**Guffey (2–0)**	Jarrell (0–1)	**Hoopes (1)**	SECN+	2,860	9–4	—
March 9	North Alabama		Sewell–Thomas Stadium	**L** 5–9	James (1–0)	**Hess (0–1)**	—	SECN+	2,305	9–5	—
March 11	Binghamton		Sewell–Thomas Stadium	**W** 9–3	**McMillan (2–0)**	Babalis (1–2)	—	SECN+	2,314	10–5	—
March 12	Binghamton		Sewell–Thomas Stadium	**W** 14–2	**Jean (1–1)**	Lumpinski (0–4)	—	SECN+	2,275	11–5	—
March 13	Binghamton		Sewell–Thomas Stadium	**W** 5–3	**McNairy (3–0)**	Bryggman (1–1)	**Ray (1)**	SECN+	2,357	12–5	—
March 16	at Southern Miss		Pete Taylor Park; Hattiesburg, MS	**L** 2–3	Stuart (2–0)	**Banks (0–1)**	Ramsey (1)	ESPN+	5,388	12–6	—
March 18	#9 Florida		Sewell–Thomas Stadium	**L** 4–6	Barco (4–1)	**McMillan (2–1)**	Purnell (1)	SECN+	2,774	12–7	0–1
March 19	#9 Florida		Sewell–Thomas Stadium	**L** 6–13	Slater (2–0)	**Furtado (2–2)**	—	SECN+	3,745	12–8	0–2
March 20	#9 Florida		Sewell–Thomas Stadium	**W** 8–7	**McNairy (4–0)**	Purnell (2–1)	—	SECN+	3,238	13–8	1–2
March 23	at UAB		Regions Field; Birmingham, AL	**L** 4–5	Greene (2–0)	**Holman (0–2)**	Taylor (1)	C-USA TV	1,214	13–9	—
March 25	at Mississippi State		Dudy Noble Field; Starkville, MS	**L** 6–7^{(10)}	Auger (2–0)	**Ray (0–2)**	—	SECN+	11,865	13–10	1–3
March 26	at Mississippi State		Dudy Noble Field	**L** 7–8	Fristoe (2–2)	**Hoopes (0–1)**	—	SECN+	14,077	13–11	1–4
March 27	at Mississippi State		Dudy Noble Field	**W** 6–2	**Hitt (2–0)**	Smith (4–1)	**Jean (1)**	SECN+	11,144	14–11	2–4
March 29	South Alabama		Sewell–Thomas Stadium	**W** 5–4	**Leger (1–0)**	Boyd (0–1)	—	SECN+	3,435	15–11	—

April (10–9)
Date	Opponent	Rank	Site/stadium	Score	Win	Loss	Save	TV	Attendance	Overall record	SEC record
April 1	Texas A&M		Sewell–Thomas Stadium	**L** 2–3	Dettmer (2–2)	**McMillan (2–2)**	Rudis (2)	SECN+	4,325	15–12	2–5
April 2	Texas A&M		Sewell–Thomas Stadium	**W** 10–9	**Jean (2–1)**	Johnston (0–1)	**Ray (1)**	SECN	4,277	16–12	3–5
April 3	Texas A&M		Sewell–Thomas Stadium	**W** 8–4	**Furtado (3–2)**	Dallas (3–1)	—	SECN+	3,337	17–12	4–5
April 5	Samford		Sewell–Thomas Stadium	**W** 10–1	**Myers (1–0)**	Lynch (0–2)	—	SECN+	2,693	18–12	—
April 8	at #9 Ole Miss		Swayze Field; Oxford, MS	**W** 7–4	**McMillan (3–2)**	Elliott (1–3)	—	SECN+	10,067	19–12	5–5
April 9	#9 at Ole Miss		Swayze Field	**W** 12–10^{(10)}	**Ray (1–2)**	Johnson (1–2)	—	SECN+	12,045	20–12	6–5
April 10	#9 at Ole Miss		Swayze Field	**W** 7–3	**Hitt (3–0)**	Washburn (4–2)	—	SECN	9,649	21–12	7–5
April 12	Belmont	#24	Sewell–Thomas Stadium	**W** 3–1	**Hess (1–1)**	Zuger (1–1)	**Myers (1)**	SECN+	2,712	22–12	–
April 15	at #1 Tennessee	#24	Lindsey Nelson Stadium; Knoxville, TN	**W** 6–3	**McMillan (4–2)**	Burns (6–1)	**Ray (1)**	SECN+	4,597	23–12	8–5
April 16	at #1 Tennessee	#24	Lindsey Nelson Stadium	**L** 2–9	Sewell (4–1)	**McNairy (4–1)**	—	SECN+	4,383	23–13	8–6
April 17	at #1 Tennessee	#24	Lindsey Nelson Stadium	**L** 4–15	Beam (8–0)	**Hitt (3–1)**	—	SECN+	4,211	23–14	8–7
April 19	UAB		Sewell–Thomas Stadium	**L** 6–7	Moza (2–0)	**Guffey (2–1)**	—	SECN+	2,982	23–15	–
April 22	#14 Georgia		Sewell–Thomas Stadium	**L** 2–4	Crisp (1–1)	**McMillan (4–3)**	Gowen (1)	SECN+	3,442	23–16	8–8
April 23	#14 Georgia		Sewell–Thomas Stadium	**L** 0–3	Cannon (7–1)	**McNairy (4–2)**	Gowen (1)	SECN+	3,765	23–17	8–9
April 24	#14 Georgia		Sewell–Thomas Stadium	**W** 3–0	**Hitt (4–1)**	Sullivan (3–2)	**Ray (1)**	ESPN2	3,129	24–17	9–9
April 26	at Samford		Joe Lee Griffin Stadium; Birmingham, AL	**W** 9–3	**Hess (2–1)**	Lynch (0–4)	—	ESPN+	1,384	25–17	–
April 28	at South Carolina		Founders Park; Columbia, SC	**L** 5–6	Austin (4–1)	**Guffey (2–2)**	—	SECN	6,124	25–18	9–10
April 29	at South Carolina		Founders Park	**L** 1–2	Becker (2–3)	**Ray (1–3)**	—	SECN+	6,635	25–19	9–11
April 30	at South Carolina		Founders Park	**L** 5–11	Sanders (6–2)	**Hitt (4–2)**	—	SECN	6,564	25–20	9–12

May (4–5)
Date	Opponent	Rank	Site/stadium	Score	Win	Loss	Save	TV	Attendance	Overall record	SEC record
May 6	#20 LSU		Sewell–Thomas Stadium	**L** 5–6	Cooper (4–2)	**Guffey (2–3)**	Gervase (5)	SECN+	3,508	25–21	9–13
May 7	#20 LSU		Sewell–Thomas Stadium	**W** 8–3	**McNairy (5–2)**	Money (2–4)	—	SECN	3,843	26–21	10–13
May 8	#20 LSU		Sewell–Thomas Stadium	**L** 3–12	Hasty (2–0)	**Hitt (4–3)**	—	SECN+	3,326	26–22	10–14
May 10	at Jacksonville State		Rudy Abbott Field; Jacksonville, AL	**W** 13–6	**Jean (3–1)**	Fortner (1–4)	—	ESPN+	1,134	27–22	–
May 13	at #20 Auburn		Plainsman Park; Auburn, AL	**L** 2–3	Armstrong (1–0)	**McMillan (4–4)**	Burkhalter (12)	SECN	4,096	27–23	10–15
May 14	at #20 Auburn		Plainsman Park	**L** 4–6	Swilling (3–2)	**Ray (1–4)**	Allsup (2)	SECN+	4,096	27–24	10–16
May 15	at #20 Auburn		Plainsman Park	No Contest							
May 19	#7 Arkansas		Sewell–Thomas Stadium	**L** 3–7	Taylor (5–0)	**McMillan (4–5)**	Tygart (8)	SECN+	2,966	27–25	10–17
May 20	#7 Arkansas		Sewell–Thomas Stadium	**W** 8–6	**McNairy (6–2)**	Noland (5–4)	**Ray (6)**	SECN	3,257	28–25	11–17
May 21	#7 Arkansas		Sewell–Thomas Stadium	**W** 18–5	**Jean (4–1)**	Wiggins (6–3)	—	SECN+	3,109	29–25	12–17

Postseason (2–2)

SEC Tournament (2–2)
Date	Opponent	Seed	Site/stadium	Score	Win	Loss	Save	TV	Attendance	Overall record	SECT Record
May 24	vs. (6) Georgia	(11)	Hoover Metropolitan Stadium; Hoover, AL	**W** 5–3	**Hess (3–1)**	Wagner (5–2)	**Ray (1)**	SECN	—	30–25	1–0
May 25	vs. (3) #13 Arkansas	(11)	Hoover Metropolitan Stadium	**W** 4–3	**Jean (5–1)**	McEntire (1–2)	**Ray (8)**	SECN	5,742	31–25	2–0
May 27	vs. (2) #5 Texas A&M	(11)	Hoover Metropolitan Stadium	**L** 8–12	Cortez (6–3)	**Guffey (2–4)**	Johnston (1)	SECN	—	31–26	2–1
May 28	vs. (7) Florida	(11)	Hoover Metropolitan Stadium	**L** 6–11	Ficarrotta (4–0)	**Leger (1–1)**	—	SECN	7,102	31–27	2–2

Legend: = Win = Loss = Canceled
Bold = Alabama team member
Rankings are based on the team's current ranking in the D1Baseball poll.

== Rankings ==
Ranking movements
	Week																
Poll	Pre	1	2	3	4	5	6	7	8	9	10	11	12	13	14	15	Final
Coaches'		*															
Baseball America																	
NCBWA†									30								

† NCBWA ranks 30 teams in their preseason poll, but only ranks 25 teams weekly during the season.
* A new poll was not released for this week, so for comparison purposes, the previous week's ranking is inserted in this week's slot.
