= 2022 Kentucky Wildcats baseball team =

2022 season of University of Kentucky baseball team

2022 Kentucky Wildcats baseball
- Conference: Southeastern Conference
- Eastern Division
- Record: 33–26 (12–18 SEC)
- Head coach: Nick Mingione (6th season)
- Assistant coaches: Will Coggin; Dan Roszel
- Home stadium: Kentucky Proud Park

2022 Southeastern Conference baseball standings
	Conf.				Overall
Team	W		L	PCT	W		L	PCT
Eastern
No. 9 Tennessee ^{x}‍†‍‡‍^{y}	25	–	5	.833	57	–	9	.864
No. 21 Florida ‍‍‍^{y}	15	–	15	.500	42	–	24	.636
Georgia ‍‍‍^{y}	15	–	15	.500	36	–	23	.610
Vanderbilt ‍‍‍^{y}	14	–	16	.467	39	–	23	.629
South Carolina ‍‍‍	13	–	17	.433	27	–	28	.491
Kentucky ‍‍‍	12	–	18	.400	33	–	26	.559
Missouri ‍‍‍	10	–	20	.333	28	–	23	.549
Western
No. 3 Texas A&M ^{x}‍‍‍^{y}	19	–	11	.633	44	–	20	.688
No. 4 Arkansas ‍‍‍^{y}	18	–	12	.600	46	–	21	.687
No. 25 LSU ‍‍‍^{y}	17	–	13	.567	40	–	22	.645
No. 7 Auburn ‍‍‍^{y}	16	–	13	.552	43	–	22	.662
No. 1 Ole Miss ‍‍‍^{y}	14	–	16	.467	42	–	23	.646
Alabama ‍‍‍	12	–	17	.414	31	–	27	.534
Mississippi State ‍‍‍	9	–	21	.300	26	–	30	.464
x – Division champion † – Conference champion ‡ – Tournament champion y – Invited to the NCAA tournament Rankings from D1Baseball

The 2022 Kentucky Wildcats baseball team represented the University of Kentucky in the 2022 NCAA Division I baseball season. The Wildcats play their home games at Kentucky Proud Park.

== Previous season ==
The Wildcats finished 29–23, 12–18 in the SEC to finish in sixth place in the East division. They were not invited to the postseason.

== Personnel ==
=== Roster ===
2021 Kentucky Wildcats roster
Pitchers: 14 - Tyler Guilfoil - Junior; 16 - Cole Stupp - Junior; 21 - Wyatt Hudepohl - Sophomore; 24 - Ryan Hagenow - Sophomore; 25 - Seth Logue - Sophomore; 31 - Alex Degen - Senior; 34 - Sean Harney - Graduate Student; 41 - Evan Byers - (redshirt) Freshman; 48 - Zack Lee - Junior; 49 - Austin Strickland - Sophomore; 50 - Mason Hazelwood - Graduate Student; 54 - Daniel Harper - Graduate Student	Catchers: 7 - Devin Burkes - (redshirt) Freshman; 9 - Alonzo Rubalcaba - Senior; Infielders: 1 - Daniel Harris IV - Graduate Student; 4 - Émilien Pitre - Freshman; 6 - Reuben Church - Sophomore; 12 - Chase Estep - Junior; 26 - Jacob Plastiak - Senior; 30 - Michael Dallas - Freshman; 47 - Ryan Ritter - Junior	Outfielders: 10 - Hunter Jump - Graduate Student; 19 - Nolan McCarthy - (redshirt) Freshman; 22 - John Thrasher - Graduate Student; 28 - Oraj Anu - Graduate Student; 55 - Adam Fogel - Graduate Student; Utility: 8 - Kirk Liebert - Senior

=== Coaching staff ===
2020 Kentucky Wildcats coaching staff
Name	Position
Nick Mingione	Head coach
Dan Roszel	Assistant Coach/Pitching
Will Coggin	Assistant Coach/Recruiting Coordinator
Nick Ammirati	Volunteer Assistant Coach

== Schedule and results ==
2022 Kentucky Wildcats baseball game log
Regular season

February
Date	Opponent	Rank	Site/stadium	Score	Win	Loss	Save	TV	Attendance	Overall record	SEC record
February 18	at Jacksonville State		Rudy Abbott Field; Jacksonville, AL	10-8	Harney (1–0)	Causey (0–1)	None		1,028	1-0	
February 19	at Jacksonville State		Rudy Abbott Field	6-2	Cotto (1–0)	Jones (0–1)	None		1,566	2-0	
February 20	at Jacksonville State		Rudy Abbott Field	15-1	Bosma (1–0)	Fortner (0–1)	None		989	3-0	
February 22	Southeast Missouri State		Kentucky Proud Park; Lexington, KY	Cancelled							
February 23	Bellarmine		Kentucky Proud Park	3-2	Strickland (1–0)	Craven(1-1)	None		1,568	4-0	
February 25	Western Michigan		Kentucky Proud Park	14-3	Stupp (1–0)	Huisman (0–1)	None		1,594	5-0	
February 26	Western Michigan		Kentucky Proud Park	13-12	Strickland (2–0)	Berg (0–1)	None		1,669	6-0	
February 27	Western Michigan		Kentucky Proud Park	16-5	Williams (1–0)	Vlcek (0–1)	None		1,709	7-0	

March
Date	Opponent	Rank	Site/stadium	Score	Win	Loss	Save	TV	Attendance	Overall record	SEC record
March 1	Western Kentucky		Kentucky Proud Park	5-7	Vinyard (2–0)	Strickland (2–1)	None		1,597	7-1	
March 2	Evansville		Kentucky Proud Park	5-4	Moore (1–0)	Reinhardt (0–1)	Williams (1)		1,737	8-1	
March 4	TCU		Kentucky Proud Park	13-11	Harney (2–0)	Perez (1-1)	None		1,776	9-1	
March 5	TCU		Kentucky Proud Park	5-1	Bosma (2–0)	Cornelio (1-1)	None		2,270	10-1	
March 6	TCU		Kentucky Proud Park	8-12	Ridings (1–0)	Harper (0–1)	None		2,270	10-2	
March 8	Murray State		Kentucky Proud Park	9-1	Logue (1–0)	Roulette (0–1)	None		1,653	11-2	
March 9	Ohio		Kentucky Proud Park	8-9	Sells (1–0)	Strickland (2-2)	None		1,527	11-3	
March 11	High Point		Kentucky Proud Park	14-3	Stupp (2–0)	Merritt (1–3)	None		3,104	12-3	
March 12	High Point		Kentucky Proud Park	9-5	Williams (2–0)	Keith (0–2)	None		3,104	13-3	
March 13	High Point		Kentucky Proud Park	4-3	Harney (3–0)	Garcia (1–2)	None		1,591	14-3	
March 15	at Indiana		Bart Kaufman Field; Bloomington, IN	7-20	Kraft (1–0)	Logue (1-1)	Holderfield (1)		1,884	14-4	
March 18	at Arkansas		Baum–Walker Stadium; Fayetteville, AR	2-6	Noland (3–1)	Stupp (2–1)	None		9,993	14-5	0-1
March 19	at Arkansas		Baum–Walker Stadium	3-9	Smith (4–1)	Cotto (1-1)	Vermillion (1)		10,300	14-6	0-2
March 20	at Arkansas		Baum–Walker Stadium	1-3	Wiggins (3–0)	Bosma (2–1)	Tygart (1)		10,317	14-7	0-3
March 22	Morehead State		Kentucky Proud Park	7-5	Hudepohl (1–0)	Callahan (0–2)	Guilfoil (1)		1,697	15-7	
March 25	Georgia		Kentucky Proud Park	2-4	Cannon (5–1)	Stupp (2-2)	Woods (1)		1,785	15-8	0-4
March 26	Georgia		Kentucky Proud Park	10-8	Harney (4–0)	Wagner (5–1)	Guilfoil (1)		1,981	16-8	1-4
March 27	Georgia		Kentucky Proud Park	18-5	Bosma (3–1)	Melear (1-1)	None		1,819	17-8	2-4
March 29	Eastern Kentucky		Kentucky Proud Park	3-6	Kalandros (3–0)	Logue (1–2)	Brian (1)		1,865	17-9	

April
Date	Opponent	Rank	Site/stadium	Score	Win	Loss	Save	TV	Attendance	Overall record	SEC record
April 1	Ole Miss		Kentucky Proud Park	1-2	Harney (4–1)	Johnson (1–0)	None		2,042	17-10	2–5
April 2	Ole Miss		Kentucky Proud Park	9-2	Williams (3–0)	Maddox (2–1)	None		2,339	18-10	3-5
April 3	Ole Miss		Kentucky Proud Park	1-10	Washburn (4–1)	Bosma (3–2)	None		2,480	18-11	3-6
April 5	Louisville	Cancelled	Kentucky Proud Park								
April 7	at Texas A&M		Blue Bell Park; College Station, TX	2-3	Palisch (3-3)	Harney (4–2)	None		5,755	18-12	3-7
April 8	at Texas A&M		Blue Bell Park	7-3	Harper (1-1)	Prager (0–1)	Guilfoil (1)		6,529	19-12	4-7
April 9	at Texas A&M		Blue Bell Park	3-17	Dallas (4–1)	Bosma (3-3)	None		6,478	19-13	4-8
April 12	Bellarmine		Kentucky Proud Park	11-1	Harper (2–1)	Johnson (0–2)	None		1,693	20-13	
April 14	at Missouri		Taylor Stadium; Columbia, MO	15-6	Hazelwood (1–0)	Miles (2–3)	Hagenow (1)		931	21-13	5-8
April 15	at Missouri		Taylor Stadium	4-9	Neubeck (3–1)	Harney (4–3)	None		1,011	21-14	5-9
April 16	at Missouri		Taylor Stadium	6-10	Guilfoil (0–1)	Carter (3–1)	None		1,231	21-15	5-10
April 19	at Louisville		Jim Patterson Stadium; Louisville, KY	2-4	Walter (2–0)	Logue (1–3)	Prosecky (1)		3,615	25-11	
April 22	Vanderbilt		Kentucky Proud Park	0-10	McElvain (5–2)	Hazelwood (1-1)	None		2,506	21-17	5-11
April 23	Vanderbilt		Kentucky Proud Park	3-2	Lee (1–0)	Holton (4–3)	Guilfoil (1)		2,394	22-17	6-11
April 24	Vanderbilt		Kentucky Proud Park	3-5	Cunningham (2–0)	Logue (1–4)	Schultz (1)		2,833	22-18	6-12
April 26	Dayton		Kentucky Proud Park	12-1	Cotto (2–1)	Whitten (2–1)	None		1,625	23-18	
April 29	at Florida		Condron Ballpark; Gainesville, FL	2-9	Sproat (5–4)	Hazelwood (1–2)	None		4,836	23-19	6-13
April 30	at Florida		Condron Ballpark	1-9	Neely (2–0)	Lee (1-1)	None		5,245	23-20	6-14

May
Date	Opponent	Rank	Site/stadium	Score	Win	Loss	Save	TV	Attendance	Overall record	SEC record
May 1	at Florida		Condron Ballpark	8-1	Harney (5–3)	Slater (2–3)	None		4,542	24-20	7-14
May 5	Tennessee		Kentucky Proud Park	3-2	Guilfoil (1-1)	Mclaughlin (2–1)	None		2,394	25-20	8-14
May 6	Tennessee		Kentucky Proud Park	5-2	Lee (2–1)	Tidwell (1-1)	Harney (1)		2,661	26-20	9-14
May 7	Tennessee		Kentucky Proud Park	2-7	Walsh (3–1)	Hudepohl (1-1)	None		3,209	26-21	9-15
May 10	UT Martin		Kentucky Proud Park	Cancelled							
May 13	at South Carolina		Founders Park; Columbia, SC	3-11	Thomas (1-1)	Strickland (2–3)	None		6,139	26-22	9-16
May 14	at South Carolina		Founders Park	0-7	Hall (3–4)	Harney (5–4)	None		6,065	26-23	12-14
May 15	at South Carolina		Founders Park	7-1	Hazelwood (2-2)	Sanders (7–3)	None		5,846	27-23	12-15
May 17	Tennessee Tech		Kentucky Proud Park	13-0	Cotto (3–1)	Hewitt (0–1)	None		1,780	28-23	10-17
May 19	Auburn		Kentucky Proud Park	5-1	Harper (3–1)	Barnett (2-2)	Harney (2)		2,734	29-23	11-18
May 20	Auburn		Kentucky Proud Park	3-6	Bright (3–4)	Hudepohl (1–2)	Burkhalter (13)		2,734	29-23	11-17
May 21	Auburn		Kentucky Proud Park	6-3	Guilfoil (2–1)	Skipper(5–3)	None		2,355	30-24	12-18

Postseason

SEC Tournament
Date	Opponent	Seed	Site/stadium	Score	Win	Loss	Save	TV	Attendance	Overall record	SECT Record
May 24	Auburn	5	Hoover Metropolitan Stadium; Hoover, AL	3-1	Guilfoil (3–1)	Burkhalter (4–2)	None	SECN	5,742	31-24	1-0
May 26	LSU	4	Hoover Metropolitan Stadium	6-11	Hilliard (7–1)	Hazelwood (2–3)	None	SECN	9,697	31-25	1-1
May 27	Vanderbilt	8	Hoover Metropolitan Stadium	10-2	Harper (4–1)	McElvain (5-5)	Guilfoil (1)	SECN	5,743	32-25	2-1
May 28	LSU	4	Hoover Metropolitan Stadium	7-2	Bosma (4–3)	Hasty (2–1)	None	SECN	7,102	33-25	3-1
May 28	Tennessee	1	Hoover Metropolitan Stadium	1-12	Burns (8–1)	Strickland (2–4)	None	SECN	8,924	33-26	3-2

Legend: = Win = Loss = Canceled
Bold = Kentucky team member
Rankings are based on the team's current ranking in the D1Baseball poll.
