= 2022 Arkansas Razorbacks baseball team =

American college baseball season

2022 Arkansas Razorbacks baseball
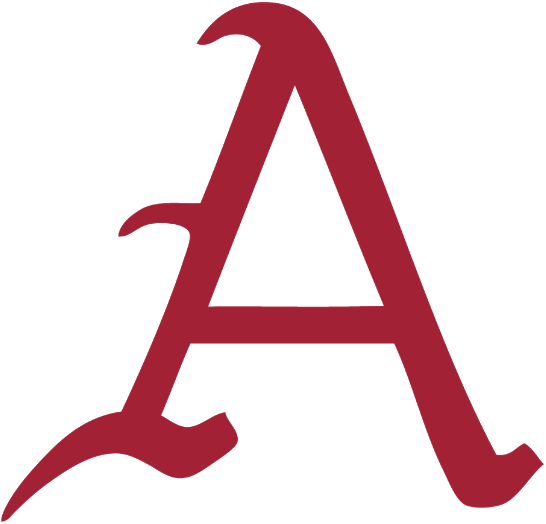

Chapel Hill Super Regional Champions Stillwater Regional Champions

College World Series, 3rd
- Conference: Southeastern Conference
- Western Division

Ranking
- Coaches: No. 10
- CB: No. 8
- Record: 46–21 (18–12 SEC)
- Head coach: Dave Van Horn (20th season)
- Assistant coaches: Matt Hobbs; Nate Thompson
- Home stadium: Baum–Walker Stadium

2022 Southeastern Conference baseball standings
	Conf.				Overall
Team	W		L	PCT	W		L	PCT
Eastern
No. 9 Tennessee ^{x}‍†‍‡‍^{y}	25	–	5	.833	57	–	9	.864
No. 21 Florida ‍‍‍^{y}	15	–	15	.500	42	–	24	.636
Georgia ‍‍‍^{y}	15	–	15	.500	36	–	23	.610
Vanderbilt ‍‍‍^{y}	14	–	16	.467	39	–	23	.629
South Carolina ‍‍‍	13	–	17	.433	27	–	28	.491
Kentucky ‍‍‍	12	–	18	.400	33	–	26	.559
Missouri ‍‍‍	10	–	20	.333	28	–	23	.549
Western
No. 3 Texas A&M ^{x}‍‍‍^{y}	19	–	11	.633	44	–	20	.688
No. 4 Arkansas ‍‍‍^{y}	18	–	12	.600	46	–	21	.687
No. 25 LSU ‍‍‍^{y}	17	–	13	.567	40	–	22	.645
No. 7 Auburn ‍‍‍^{y}	16	–	13	.552	43	–	22	.662
No. 1 Ole Miss ‍‍‍^{y}	14	–	16	.467	42	–	23	.646
Alabama ‍‍‍	12	–	17	.414	31	–	27	.534
Mississippi State ‍‍‍	9	–	21	.300	26	–	30	.464
x – Division champion † – Conference champion ‡ – Tournament champion y – Invited to the NCAA tournament Rankings from D1Baseball

The 2022 Arkansas Razorbacks baseball team represented the University of Arkansas in the 2022 NCAA Division I baseball season. The Razorbacks played their home games at Baum–Walker Stadium.

== Previous season ==
The Razorbacks finished 50–13, 22–8 in the SEC to win the regular season conference title. The Razorbacks also went on to win the 2021 Southeastern Conference baseball tournament. They entered the NCAA tournament as the #1 seed. They hosted the Fayetteville Regional and went 3–1 to advance to Super Regionals. The Razorbacks hosted the Fayetteville Super Regional in which they lost to NC State to close their season.

== Schedule and results ==
2022 Arkansas Razorbacks baseball game log (46–21)
Regular season (38–16)

February (4–2)
Date	Opponent	Rank	Site/stadium	Score	Win	Loss	Save	TV	Attendance	Overall record	SEC record
February 18	Illinois State	No. 2	Baum–Walker Stadium; Fayetteville, AR	**L** 2–3	Hart (1–0)	**Ramage** (0–1)	Kubiatowicz (1)	SECN+	10,116	0–1	—
February 19	Illinois State	No. 2	Baum–Walker Stadium	**W** 5–1	**Smith** (1–0)	Sinisko (0–1)	**Tole** (1)	SECN+	10,906	1–1	—
February 20	Illinois State	No. 2	Baum–Walker Stadium	**W** 4–2	**Wiggins** (1–0)	Salata (0–1)	**Ramage** (1)	SECN+	10,434	2–1	—
Karbach Round Rock Classic
February 25	vs. Indiana	No. 2	Dell Diamond; Round Rock, TX	**W** 5–2	**Noland** (1–0)	Biagio-Modugno (0–2)	**Ramage** (2)	FloSports	9,421	3–1	—
February 27	vs. No. 6 Stanford	No. 2	Dell Diamond	**L** 0–5	Matthews (1–1)	**Smith** (1–1)	None	FloSports	N/A	3–2	—
February 27	vs. Louisiana	No. 2	Dell Diamond	**W** 6–4	**Vermillion** (1–0)	Theut (0–1)	**Ramage** (3)	FloSports	DH	4–2	—

March (15–4)
Date	Opponent	Rank	Site/stadium	Score	Win	Loss	Save	TV	Attendance	Overall record	SEC record
March 2	Omaha	No. 3	Baum–Walker Stadium	**W** 15–3	**Taylor** (1–0)	Gordon (0–1)	None	SECN+	10,326	5–2	—
March 4	Southeastern Louisiana	No. 3	Baum–Walker Stadium	**L** 3–7	Kinzeler (1–0)	**Noland** (1–1)	Trahan (2)	SECN+	9,273	5–3	—
March 5	Southeastern Louisiana	No. 3	Baum–Walker Stadium	**W** 4–2	**Smith** (2–1)	Harrington (0–2)	**Tygart** (1)	SECN+	10,321	6–3	—
March 6	Southeastern Louisiana	No. 3	Baum–Walker Stadium	**W** 11–1^{8}	**Wiggins** (2–0)	O'Toole (0–2)	None	SECN+	DH	7–3	—
March 10	UIC	No. 3	Baum–Walker Stadium	**W** 12–4	**Noland** (2–1)	Peterson (1–2)	None	SECN+	10,420	8–3	—
March 10	UIC	No. 3	Baum–Walker Stadium	**W** 5–4	**Tygart** (1–0)	Shears (1–1)	None	SECN+	DH	9–3	—
March 12	UIC	No. 3	Baum–Walker Stadium	**W** 10–1	**Smith** (3–1)	Lopez (1–1)	None	SECN+	10,221	10–3	—
March 13	UIC	No. 3	Baum–Walker Stadium	**W** 10–8	**Adamiak** (1–0)	Shears (1–2)	None	SECN+	10,101	11–3	—
March 15	Grambling State	No. 3	Baum–Walker Stadium	**W** 14–1^{8}	**Adamiak** (2–0)	Peguero (1–1)	None	SECN+	9,381	12–3	—
March 16	Grambling State	No. 3	Baum–Walker Stadium	**W** 13–3^{8}	**Morris** (1–0)	Boudreaux (0–2)	None	SECN+	9,496	13–3	—
March 18	Kentucky	No. 3	Baum–Walker Stadium	**W** 6–2	**Noland** (3–1)	Stupp (2–1)	None	SECN+	9,993	14–3	1–0
March 19	Kentucky	No. 3	Baum–Walker Stadium	**W** 9–3	**Smith** (4–1)	Cotto (1–1)	**Vermillion** (1)	SECN+	10,300	15–3	2–0
March 20	Kentucky	No. 3	Baum–Walker Stadium	**W** 3–1	**Wiggins** (3–0)	Bosma (2–1)	**Tygart** (2)	SECN+	10,317	16–3	3–0
March 23	vs. Omaha		Kauffman Stadium; Kansas City, MO	Cancelled due to cold temperatures							
March 25	at Missouri	No. 3	Taylor Stadium; Columbia, MO	**W** 7–5	**Vermillion** (2–0)	Landry (1–2)	**Tygart** (3)	SECN+	852	17–3	4–0
March 26	at Missouri	No. 3	Taylor Stadium	**L** 5–7	Lohse (1–1)	**Trest** (0–1)	None	SECN	907	17–4	4–1
March 27	at Missouri	No. 3	Taylor Stadium	**W** 6–4	**Wiggins** (4–0)	Wall (0–2)	**Tygart** (4)	SECN+	1,127	18–4	5–1
March 29	Little Rock	No. 2	Baum–Walker Stadium	**W** 16–8	**Taylor** (2–0)	Davis (0–3)	None	SECN+	9,502	19–4	—
March 30	Little Rock	No. 2	Baum–Walker Stadium	Cancelled due to cold temperatures							

April (14–6)
Date	Opponent	Rank	Site/stadium	Score	Win	Loss	Save	TV	Attendance	Overall record	SEC record
April 1	Mississippi State	No. 2	Baum–Walker Stadium	**W** 8–1	**Noland** (4–1)	Johnson (2–2)	None	SECN	11,548	20–4	6–1
April 2	Mississippi State	No. 2	Baum–Walker Stadium	**W** 12–5	**Smith** (5–1)	Stinnett (3–1)	None	SECN+	11,522	21–4	7–1
April 3	Mississippi State	No. 2	Baum–Walker Stadium	**L** 3–5 ^{12}	Fristoe (3–2)	**Ramage** (0–2)	None	SECN+	11,415	21–5	7–2
April 5	Central Arkansas	No. 2	Baum–Walker Stadium	**W** 21–9	**Morris** (2–0)	Fenton (0–2)	None	SECN+	9,614	22–5	—
April 7	at Florida	No. 2	Florida Ballpark; Gainesville, FL	**W** 8–1	**Noland** (5–1)	Barco (5–2)	**Vermillion** (2)	SECN	4,643	23–5	8–2
April 8	at Florida	No. 2	Florida Ballpark	**L** 2–7	Sproat (4–3)	**Smith** (5–2)	Purnell (3)	SECN+	5,795	23–6	8–3
April 9	at Florida	No. 2	Florida Ballpark	**L** 7–9	Purnell (3–2)	**Tygart** (1–1)	None	SECN+	5,806	23–7	8–4
April 12	Arkansas–Pine Bluff	No. 6	Baum–Walker Stadium	**W** 15–0^{7}	**Ramage** (1–2)	Elarton (2–5)	None	SECN+	8,959	24–7	—
April 12	Arkansas–Pine Bluff	No. 6	Baum–Walker Stadium	**W** 6–0^{7}	**McEntire** (1–0)	Little (1–2)	None	SECN+	8,973	25–7	—
April 14	No. 15 LSU	No. 6	Baum–Walker Stadium	**W** 5–4	**Taylor** (3–0)	Cooper (2–2)	**Tygart** (5)	SECN+	10,270	26–7	9–4
April 15	No. 15 LSU	No. 6	Baum–Walker Stadium	**W** 4–0	**Smith** (6–2)	Money (2–3)	**Taylor** (1)	SECN	10,811	27–7	10–4
April 16	No. 15 LSU	No. 6	Baum–Walker Stadium	**W** 6–2	**Wiggins** (5–0)	Taylor (4–1)	None	SECN+	11,049	28–7	11–4
Arkansas–Arkansas State Series
April 19	Arkansas State	No. 4	Baum–Walker Stadium	**W** 10–1	**Ramage** (2–2)	Holt (0–2)	None	SECN+	9,286	29–7	—
April 20	Arkansas State	No. 4	Baum–Walker Stadium	**W** 10–3	**Tole** (1–0)	Frederick (0–2)	None	SECN+	9,002	30–7	—
April 22	at Texas A&M	No. 4	Blue Bell Park; College Station, TX	**L** 1–2	Dettmer (4–2)	**Noland** (5–2)	Palisch (2)	SECN	6,972	30–8	11–5
April 23	at Texas A&M	No. 4	Blue Bell Park	**W** 3–1	**Morris** (3–0)	Dallas (4–2)	**Tygart** (6)	SECN+	7,012	31–8	12–5
April 24	at Texas A&M	No. 4	Blue Bell Park	**L** 10–11	Rudis (3–0)	**Wiggins** (5–1)	Palisch (3)	SECN+	6,016	31–9	12–6
April 26	vs. Central Arkansas	No. 5	Dickey–Stephens Park; North Little Rock, AR	**W** 2–1^{10}	**Tole** (2–0)	Shoultz (3–4)	None	None	10,333	32–9	—
April 29	Ole Miss	No. 5	Baum–Walker Stadium	**L** 2–4	DeLucia (4–0)	**Noland** (5–3)	Johnson (5)	SECN+	11,651	32–10	12–7
April 30	Ole Miss	No. 5	Baum–Walker Stadium	**W** 6–3	**Tygart** (2–1)	Dougherty (1–3)	None	ESPN2	11,736	33–10	13–7

May (5–6)
Date	Opponent	Rank	Site/stadium	Score	Win	Loss	Save	TV	Attendance	Overall record	SEC record
May 1	Ole Miss	No. 5	Baum–Walker Stadium	**W** 4–3	**Morris** (4–0)	Diamond (3–4)	**Tygart** (7)	ESPN	11,409	34–10	14–7
May 3	Missouri State	No. 4	Baum–Walker Stadium	**L** 4–6	Lang (2–2)	**McEntire** (1–1)	McMahill (2)	SECN+	9,419	34–11	—
May 6	at No. 19 Auburn	No. 4	Plainsman Park; Auburn, AL	**W** 11–8	**Taylor** (4–0)	Skipper (4–2)	None	SECN+	3,738	35–11	15–7
May 7	at No. 19 Auburn	No. 4	Plainsman Park	**L** 3–5	Swilling (2–2)	**Tygart** (2–2)	None	SECN	3,875	35–12	15–8
May 8	at No. 19 Auburn	No. 4	Plainsman Park	**W** 7–4	**Wiggins** (6–1)	Gonzalez (6–2)	**Taylor** (2)	SECN+	3,515	36–12	16–8
May 13	No. 24 Vanderbilt	No. 4	Baum–Walker Stadium	**L** 6–9 ^{10}	Schultz (4–1)	**Tygart** (2–3)	None	SECN+	11,772	36–13	16–9
May 14	No. 24 Vanderbilt	No. 4	Baum–Walker Stadium	**W** 11–6	**Morris** (5–0)	McElvain (5–4)	**McEntire** (1)	SECN+	11,761	37–13	17–9
May 15	No. 24 Vanderbilt	No. 4	Baum–Walker Stadium	**L** 0–5^{7}	Holton (7–3)	**Wiggins** (6–2)	None	SECN+	10,806	37–14	17–10
May 19	at Alabama	No. 7	Sewell–Thomas Stadium; Tuscaloosa, AL	**W** 7–3	**Taylor** (5–0)	McMillan (4–5)	**Tygart** (8)	SECN+	2,966	38–14	18–10
May 20	at Alabama	No. 7	Sewell–Thomas Stadium	**L** 6–8	McNairy (6–2)	**Noland** (5–4)	Ray (6)	SECN	3,257	38–15	18–11
May 21	at Alabama	No. 7	Sewell–Thomas Stadium	**L** 5–18	Jean (4–1)	**Wiggins** (6–3)	None	SECN+	3,109	38–16	18–12

Postseason (5–3)

SEC Tournament (0–2)
Date	Opponent	Seed/rank	Site/stadium	Score	Win	Loss	Save	TV	Attendance	Overall record	SECT record
May 25	(11) Alabama	(3) No. 13	Hoover Metropolitan Stadium; Hoover, AL	**L** 3–4	Jean (5–1)	**McEntire** (1–2)	Ray (8)	SECN	5,742	38–17	0–1
May 27	(7) Florida	(3) No. 13	Hoover Metropolitan Stadium; Hoover, AL	**L** 5–7	Pogue (4–3)	**Noland** (5–5)	Slater (5)	SECN	5,743	38–18	0–2

NCAA Stillwater Regional (3–1)
Date	Opponent	Seed/rank	Site/stadium	Score	Win	Loss	Save	Attendance	Overall record	NCAAT record
June 3	vs. (3) Grand Canyon	(2) No. 23	O'Brate Stadium • Stillwater, OK	**W** 7–1	**Noland** (6–5)	Avitia (8–5)	None	5,448	39–18	1–0
June 4	vs. (1) No. 6 Oklahoma State	(2) No. 23	O'Brate Stadium • Stillwater, OK	**W** 20–12	**Tygart** (3–3)	Phansalkar (6–3)	None	5,993	40–18	2–0
June 5	vs. (1) No. 6 Oklahoma State	(2) No. 23	O'Brate Stadium • Stillwater, OK	**L** 10–14 ^{10}	McLean (2–1)	**Tygart** (3–4)	None	5,735	40–19	2–1
June 6	vs. (1) No. 6 Oklahoma State	(2) No. 23	O'Brate Stadium • Stillwater, OK	**W** 7–3	**Ramage** (3–2)	Bogusz (3–1)	None	7,048	41–19	3–1

NCAA Chapel Hill Super Regional (2–0)
Date	Opponent	Seed/rank	Site/stadium	Score	Win	Loss	Save	Attendance	Overall record	NCAAT record
June 11	vs. (10) No. 11 North Carolina	No. 23	Boshamer Stadium • Chapel Hill, NC	**W** 4–1	**Noland** (7–5)	Carlson (4–3)	None	3,794	42–19	1–0
June 12	vs. (10) No. 11 North Carolina	No. 23	Boshamer Stadium • Chapel Hill, NC	**W** 4–3	**Morris** (6–0)	O'Brien (3–1)	None	3,831	43–19	2–0

NCAA College World Series (3–2)
Date	Opponent	Seed/rank	Site/stadium	Score	Win	Loss	Save	Attendance	Overall record	NCAAT record
June 18	(2) No. 2 Stanford	No. 23	Charles Schwab Field Omaha • Omaha, Nebraska,	**W** 17–2	**Noland** (8–5)	Williams (8–4)	None	24,337	44–19	1–0
June 20	Ole Miss	No. 23	Charles Schwab Field Omaha • Omaha, Nebraska,	**L** 5–13	Elliott (5–3)	**Morris** (6–1)	None	25,246	44–20	1–1
June 21	(14) No. 25 Auburn	No. 23	Charles Schwab Field Omaha • Omaha, Nebraska,	**W** 11–1	**McEntire** (2–2)	Barnett (3–3)	None	24,636	45–20	2–1
June 22	Ole Miss	No. 23	Charles Schwab Field Omaha • Omaha, Nebraska,	**W** 3–2	**Smith** (7–2)	Gaddis (3–2)	Morris (1)	25,401	46–20	3–1
June 23	Ole Miss	No. 23	Charles Schwab Field Omaha • Omaha, Nebraska,	**L** 0–2	DeLucia (8–2)	**Noland** (8–6)	None	20,434	46–21	3–2

*Denotes non–conference game • Schedule source • Rankings based on the teams' current ranking in the D1Baseball poll
**W** Arkansas win • **L** Arkansas loss • Postponement or cancellation • **Bold** denotes Arkansas player

== Postseason ==
Arkansas finished in second place in the SEC West, and lost back-to-back games in the SEC Tournament. But the team would go on a run in the NCAA tournament, winning the Stillwater Regional over the host Oklahoma State Cowboys. The Razorbacks would also win the Chapel Hill Super Regional in Chapel Hill, NC over North Carolina, which would send them to the 2022 College World Series. The Razorbacks would finish 3rd in the CWS going 3-2, and finishing with an overall record of 46-21.

=== Awards ===
Arkansas placed two players on the SEC All-Defensive Team: SP Connor Noland and 2B Robert Moore.

Arkansas also placed two players on the Freshman All-SEC Team: RP Brady Tygart and SP Hagen Smith.

Catcher Michael Turner was named the MVP of the Stillwater Regional. In addition to Turner, Connor Noland, Jalen Battles, Peyton Stovall, and Cayden Wallace were all named to the Stillwater All-Regional Team.

2nd baseman Robert Moore also became Arkansas' first ever winner of the Rawlings Gold Glove Award, which is given to the best defensive player at each position nationally.

== See also ==
- 2022 Arkansas Razorbacks softball team
