= 2022 Southeastern Conference baseball tournament =

- Teams: 12
- Format: See below
- Finals site: Hoover Metropolitan Stadium; Hoover, AL
- Champions: Tennessee (4th title)
- Winning coach: Tony Vitello (1st title)
- MVP: Drew Gilbert (Tennessee)
- Television: SEC Network, ESPN2 (Championship game)

2022 Southeastern Conference baseball standings
	Conf.				Overall
Team	W		L	PCT	W		L	PCT
Eastern
No. 9 Tennessee ^{x}‍†‍‡‍^{y}	25	–	5	.833	57	–	9	.864
No. 21 Florida ‍‍‍^{y}	15	–	15	.500	42	–	24	.636
Georgia ‍‍‍^{y}	15	–	15	.500	36	–	23	.610
Vanderbilt ‍‍‍^{y}	14	–	16	.467	39	–	23	.629
South Carolina ‍‍‍	13	–	17	.433	27	–	28	.491
Kentucky ‍‍‍	12	–	18	.400	33	–	26	.559
Missouri ‍‍‍	10	–	20	.333	28	–	23	.549
Western
No. 3 Texas A&M ^{x}‍‍‍^{y}	19	–	11	.633	44	–	20	.688
No. 4 Arkansas ‍‍‍^{y}	18	–	12	.600	46	–	21	.687
No. 25 LSU ‍‍‍^{y}	17	–	13	.567	40	–	22	.645
No. 7 Auburn ‍‍‍^{y}	16	–	13	.552	43	–	22	.662
No. 1 Ole Miss ‍‍‍^{y}	14	–	16	.467	42	–	23	.646
Alabama ‍‍‍	12	–	17	.414	31	–	27	.534
Mississippi State ‍‍‍	9	–	21	.300	26	–	30	.464
x – Division champion † – Conference champion ‡ – Tournament champion y – Invited to the NCAA tournament Rankings from D1Baseball

The 2022 Southeastern Conference baseball tournament was held from May 24 through 29 at Hoover Metropolitan Stadium in Hoover, Alabama as the conclusion of the 2022 Southeastern Conference baseball season. The annual tournament determined the tournament champion of the Division I Southeastern Conference in college baseball. The Tennessee Volunteers earned the conference's automatic bid to the 2022 NCAA Division I baseball tournament.

The tournament has been held every year since 1977 (with the exception of 2020), with LSU claiming twelve championships, the most of any school. Original members Georgia and Kentucky along with 2013 addition Missouri have never won the tournament. This is the twenty-third consecutive year and twenty-fifth overall that the event has scheduled to be held at Hoover Metropolitan Stadium, known from 2007 through 2012 as Regions Park.

== Format ==
The regular season division winners claim the top two seeds and the next ten teams by conference winning percentage, regardless of division, claim the remaining berths in the tournament. The bottom eight teams play a single-elimination opening round, followed by a double-elimination format until the semifinals, when the format reverts to single elimination through the championship game. This is the ninth year of this format.

== Standings ==
Pos	Div	Team	Pld	W	L	PCT	GB	Qualification
1	E	Tennessee (C)	30	25	5	.833	—	Qualification for the second round & NCAA tournament
2	W	Texas A&M	30	19	11	.633	6	Qualification for the second round & NCAA tournament
3	W	Arkansas	30	18	12	.600	7	Qualification for the second round & NCAA tournament
4	W	LSU	30	17	13	.567	8	Qualification for the second round & NCAA tournament
5	W	Auburn	29	16	13	.552	8.5	Qualification for the first round & NCAA tournament
6	E	Georgia	30	15	15	.500	10	Qualification for the first round & NCAA tournament
7	E	Florida	30	15	15	.500	10	Qualification for the first round & NCAA tournament
8	E	Vanderbilt	30	14	16	.467	11	Qualification for the first round & NCAA tournament
9	W	Ole Miss	30	14	16	.467	11	Qualification for the first round & NCAA tournament
10	E	South Carolina	30	13	17	.433	12	Qualification for the first round
11	W	Alabama	29	12	17	.414	12.5	Qualification for the first round
12	E	Kentucky	30	12	18	.400	13	Qualification for the first round
13	E	Missouri	30	10	20	.333	15	
14	W	Mississippi State	30	9	21	.300	16	

Source: SEC
(C) Champion

== Bracket ==
First round
May 24
6	Georgia	3
11	Alabama	5
May 24
7	Florida	2
10	South Carolina	1^{10}
May 24
8	Vanderbilt	3
9	Ole Miss	1
May 25
5	Auburn	1
12	Kentucky	3

Second round
May 25
3	Arkansas	3
11	Alabama	4
May 26
2	Texas A&M	10
7	Florida	0^{7}
May 27
3	Arkansas	5
7	Florida	7
May 26
1	Tennessee	10
8	Vanderbilt	1
May 26
4	LSU	11
12	Kentucky	6
May 27
8	Vanderbilt	2
12	Kentucky	10

Third round
May 27
11	Alabama	8
2	Texas A&M	12
May 28
11	Alabama	6
7	Florida	11
May 27
1	Tennessee	5
4	LSU	2
May 28
4	LSU	2
12	Kentucky	7

Semifinals
May 28
2	Texas A&M	0
7	Florida	9
May 28
1	Tennessee	12
12	Kentucky	2

Final
May 29
7	Florida	5
1	Tennessee	8

== Schedule ==
Game	Time*	Matchup^{#}	Score	Television	Attendance
Tuesday, May 24
1	9:30 a.m.	No. 6 Georgia vs. No. 11 Alabama	3–5	SEC Network	5,506
2	6:45 p.m.	No. 7 Florida vs. No. 10 South Carolina	2–1^{10}	SEC Network	5,506
3	9:45 p.m.	No. 8 Vanderbilt vs. No. 9 Ole Miss	3–1	SEC Network	5,506
Wednesday, May 25
4	12:45 p.m.	No. 5 Auburn vs. No. 12 Kentucky	1–3	SEC Network	5,742
5	4:30 p.m.	No. 3 Arkansas vs. No. 11 Alabama	3–4	SEC Network	
Thursday, May 26
6	2:45 p.m.	No. 2 Texas A&M vs. No. 7 Florida	10–0^{7}	SEC Network	8,251
7	6:15 p.m.	No. 1 Tennessee vs. No. 8 Vanderbilt	10–1	SEC Network	9,697
8	9:45 p.m.	No. 4 LSU vs. No. 12 Kentucky	11–6	SEC Network	9,697
Friday, May 27
9	9:30 a.m.	No. 3 Arkansas vs. No. 7 Florida	5–7	SEC Network	5,743
10	1:15 p.m.	No. 8 Vanderbilt vs. No. 12 Kentucky	2–10	SEC Network	5,743
11	5:30 p.m.	No. 2 Texas A&M vs No. 11 Alabama	12–8	SEC Network	12,215
12	10:05 p.m.	No. 1 Tennessee vs. No. 4 LSU	5–2	SEC Network	12,215
Semifinals – Saturday, May 28
13	9:30 a.m.	No. 7 Florida vs. No. 11 Alabama	11–6	SEC Network	7,102
14	1:10 p.m.	No. 12 Kentucky vs. No. 4 LSU	7–2	SEC Network	7,102
15	5:20 p.m.	No. 7 Florida vs. No. 2 Texas A&M	9–0	SEC Network	8,924
16	8:55 p.m.	No. 12 Kentucky vs. No. 1 Tennessee	2–12	SEC Network	8,924
Championship – Sunday, May 29
17	2:00 p.m.	No. 7 Florida vs. No. 1 Tennessee	5–8	ESPN2	13,270
*Game times in CDT. # – Rankings denote tournament seed.

== Conference championship ==
SEC Championship
(1) Tennessee Volunteers	vs.	(7) Florida Gators

May 29, 2022, 2:04 p.m. (CDT) at Hoover Met in Hoover, Alabama
Team	1	2	3	4	5	6	7	8	9	R	H	E
(1) Tennessee	0	0	0	0	4	3	0	0	1	8	11	1
(7) Florida	0	0	0	0	0	0	0	3	2	5	13	2
WP: Camden Sewell (7–1) LP: Carsten Finnvold (1–1); Home runs: Tenn: Drew Gilbert (9); UF: BT Riopelle (15); Attendance: 13,270
