= 2022 Auburn Tigers baseball team =

American college baseball season

2022 Auburn Tigers baseball

NCAA Auburn Regional champions NCAA Corvallis Super Regional champions

College World Series, 1–2
- Conference: Southeastern Conference
- Western Division
- Record: 43–22 (16–13 SEC)
- Head coach: Butch Thompson (7th season)
- Assistant coaches: Gabe Gross; Karl Nonemaker; Tim Hudson
- Home stadium: Plainsman Park

2022 Southeastern Conference baseball standings
	Conf.				Overall
Team	W		L	PCT	W		L	PCT
Eastern
No. 9 Tennessee ^{x}‍†‍‡‍^{y}	25	–	5	.833	57	–	9	.864
No. 21 Florida ‍‍‍^{y}	15	–	15	.500	42	–	24	.636
Georgia ‍‍‍^{y}	15	–	15	.500	36	–	23	.610
Vanderbilt ‍‍‍^{y}	14	–	16	.467	39	–	23	.629
South Carolina ‍‍‍	13	–	17	.433	27	–	28	.491
Kentucky ‍‍‍	12	–	18	.400	33	–	26	.559
Missouri ‍‍‍	10	–	20	.333	28	–	23	.549
Western
No. 3 Texas A&M ^{x}‍‍‍^{y}	19	–	11	.633	44	–	20	.688
No. 4 Arkansas ‍‍‍^{y}	18	–	12	.600	46	–	21	.687
No. 25 LSU ‍‍‍^{y}	17	–	13	.567	40	–	22	.645
No. 7 Auburn ‍‍‍^{y}	16	–	13	.552	43	–	22	.662
No. 1 Ole Miss ‍‍‍^{y}	14	–	16	.467	42	–	23	.646
Alabama ‍‍‍	12	–	17	.414	31	–	27	.534
Mississippi State ‍‍‍	9	–	21	.300	26	–	30	.464
x – Division champion † – Conference champion ‡ – Tournament champion y – Invited to the NCAA tournament Rankings from D1Baseball

The 2022 Auburn Tigers baseball team represented Auburn University in the 2022 NCAA Division I baseball season. The Tigers played their home games at Plainsman Park.

== Previous season ==
The Tigers finished 25–27, 10–20 in the SEC to finish in sixth place in the West division. They were not invited to the postseason.

== Schedule and results ==
2022 Auburn Tigers baseball game log
Regular season

February
Date	Opponent	Rank	Site/stadium	Score	Win	Loss	Save	TV	Attendance	Overall record	SEC record
State Farm College Baseball Showdown
February 18	vs. Oklahoma		Globe Life Field; Arlington, TX	**L** 0-3	Sundloff (1-0)	**Mullins** (0-1)	Godman (1)			0-1	0-0
February 19	vs. No. 12 Texas Tech		Globe Life Field	**W** 2-1	**Gonzalez** (1-0)	Birdsell (0-1)	**Burkhalter** (1)			1-1	0-0
February 20	vs. Kansas State		Globe Life Field	**W** 12-1	**Bright** (1-0)	Ruebeck (0-1)	None			2-1	0-0
February 23	Troy		Plainsman Park; Auburn, AL	**W** 13-1	**Mullins** (1-0)	Fletcher (0-1)	None			3-1	0-0
February 25	Yale		Plainsman Park	**W** 9-0	**Armstrong** (1-0)	Kipp (0-1)	None		3,344	4-1	0-0
February 26 (DH)	Yale		Plainsman Park	**W** 4-3	**Burkhalter** (1-0)	Easterly (0-1)	None		3,733	5-1	0-0
February 26 (DH)	Yale		Plainsman Park	**L** 4-5	Capell (1-0)	**Swilling** (0-1)	None		3,733	5-2	0-0

March
Date	Opponent	Rank	Site/stadium	Score	Win	Loss	Save	TV	Attendance	Overall record	SEC record
March 1	Alabama State		Plainsman Park	**W** 13-7	**Drabick** (1-0)	Melendez (0-1)	None		2,984	6-2	0-0
March 2	UAB		Plainsman Park	**W** 16-1	**Barnett** (1-0)	Ballard (1-1)	None		3,152	7-2	0-0
March 4	Rhode Island		Plainsman Park	**W** 7-2	**Skipper** (1-0)	Twitchell (0-3)	**Burkhalter** (2)		3,435	8-2	0-0
March 5 (DH)	Rhode Island		Plainsman Park	**W** 16-0	**Gonzalez** (2-0)	Picone (0-2)	None		3,721	9-2	0-0
March 5 (DH)	Rhode Island		Plainsman Park	**W** 12-0 (7)	**Bright** (2-0)	Fernandez (0-1)	None		3,721	10-2	0-0
March 6	Rhode Island		Plainsman Park	**W** 14-1	**Carlson** (1-0)	Levesque (0-2)	**Sheehan** (1)		3,103	11-2	0-0
March 8	vs. Tennessee Tech		Toyota Field; Madison, AL	**W** 4-3	**Burkhalter** (2-0)	Sylvester (1-1)	None		6,710	12-2	0-0
March 11	Middle Tennessee		Plainsman Park	**L** 8-10	Seibert (1-2)	**Armstrong** (1)	None		2,867	12-3	0-0
March 13 (DH)	Middle Tennessee		Plainsman Park	**W** 10-7	**Sheehan** (1-0)	Swan (0-2)	**Burkhalter** (3)		3,146	13-3	0-0
March 13 (DH)	Middle Tennessee		Plainsman Park	**L** 3-4 (8)	Wigginton (2-2)	**Swilling** (0-2)	None		3,146	13-4	0-0
March 15	Kennesaw State		Plainsman Park	Postponed							
March 17	No. 1 Ole Miss		Plainsman Park	**L** 6-13	DeLucia (1-0)	**Barnett** (1-1)	None		3,926	13-5	0-1
March 18	No. 1 Ole Miss		Plainsman Park	**W** 19-5	**Mullins** (2-1)	Diamond (3-1)	None		3,435	14-5	1-1
March 19	No. 1 Ole Miss		Plainsman Park	**L** 2-15	Dougherty (1-1)	Bright (2-1)	None		4,096	14-6	1-2
March 22	vs. South Alabama		Riverwalk Stadium; Montgomery, AL	**W** 13-12	**Burkhalter** (3-0)	Lin (1-1)	None		1,535	15-6	1-2
March 25	at Texas A&M		Blue Bell Park; College Station, TX	**W** 6-5 (10)	**Armstrong** (2-1)	Menefee (0-2)	**Burkhalter** (4)		7,492	16-6	2-2
March 26	at Texas A&M		Blue Bell Park	**L** 4-5 (11)	Rudis (1-0)	**Isbell** (0-1)	None		6,342	16-7	2-3
March 27	at Texas A&M		Blue Bell Park	**W** 13-9	**Allsup** (1-0)	Palisch (2-3)	None		5,828	17-7	3-3
March 29	Jacksonville State		Plainsman Park	**L** 2-5	Turner (1-0)	**Carlson** (1-1)	Fortner (1)		4,096	17-8	3-3
March 31	at No. 11 LSU		Alex Box Stadium; Baton Rouge, LA	**W** 6-5	**Skipper** (2-0)	Money (2-2)	**Burkhalter** (5)		10,247	18-8	4-3

April
Date	Opponent	Rank	Site/stadium	Score	Win	Loss	Save	TV	Attendance	Overall record	SEC record
April 1	at No. 11 LSU		Alex Box Stadium	**L** 2-9	Hilliard (3-0)	**Bright** (2-2)	None		11,111	18-9	4-4
April 2	at No. 11 LSU		Alex Box Stadium	**W** 6-4	**Gonzalez** (3-0)	Dutton (0-1)	**Burkhalter** (6)		11,071	19-9	5-4
April 5	at UAB	25	Regions Field; Birmingham, AL	**W** 6-4	**Armstrong** (3-1)	Harris (1-1)	**Allsup** (1)		2,252	20-9	5-4
April 8	No. 12 Vanderbilt	25	Plainsman Park	**W** 5-1	**Skipper** (3-0)	McElvain (4-2)	**Burkhalter** (7)		3,925	21-9	6-4
April 9	No. 12 Vanderbilt	25	Plainsman Park	**L** 4-19	Cunningham (1-0)	**Bright** (2-3)	None		4,096	21-10	6-5
April 10	No. 12 Vanderbilt	25	Plainsman Park	**W** 8-2	**Gonzalez** (4-0)	Reilly (2-2)	None		3,796	22-10	7-5
April 12	Samford	17	Plainsman Park	**W** 4-1	**Barnett** (2-1)	McCormack (0-1)	Armstrong (1)		3,725	23-10	7-5
April 14	at Mississippi State	17	Dudy Noble Field; Starkville, MS	**L** 6-7	Stinnett (4-1)	**Burkhalter** (3-1)	None		10,663	23-11	7-5
April 15	at Mississippi State	17	Dudy Noble Field	**L** 5-9	Preston (3-2)	**Bright** (2-4)	Hunt (1)		12,346	23-12	7-6
April 16	at Mississippi State	17	Dudy Noble Field	**W** 3-2	**Gonzalez** (5-0)	Fristoe (3-4)	**Burkhalter** (8)		9,799	24-12	7-7
April 19	Alabama State	19	Plainsman Park	**W** 6-5 (10)	**Burkhalter** (4-1)	Colon (0-1)	None		3,013	25-12	8-7
April 20	Kennesaw State	19	Plainsman Park	**W** 14-1	**Copeland** (1-0)	Stills (1-1)	None		2,996	26-12	8-7
April 22	South Carolina	19	Plainsman Park	**W** 6-3	**Skipper** (4-0)	Gilreath (1-3)	**Burkhalter** (9)		3,698	27-12	9-7
April 23	South Carolina	19	Plainsman Park	**W** 8-6	**Swilling** (1-2)	Becker (1-3)	**Burkhalter** (10)		4,096	28-12	10-7
April 24	South Carolina	19	Plainsman Park	**W** 2-0	**Gonzalez** (6-0)	Sanders (5-2)	**Burkhalter** (11)		3,501	29-12	11-7
April 26	at Jacksonville State	19	Rudy Abbott Field; Jacksonville, AL	**W** 8-4	**Copeland** (2-0)	Fortner (1-3)	None		1,673	30-12	11-7
April 29	at No. 1 Tennessee	19	Lindsey Nelson Stadium; Knoxville, TN	**L** 4-17	McLaughlin (2-0)	**Skipper** (4-1)	None		4,584	30-13	11-8
April 30	at No. 1 Tennessee	19	Lindsey Nelson Stadium	**W** 8-6	**Copeland** (3-0)	Walsh (2-1)	None		4,635	31-13	12-8

May
Date	Opponent	Rank	Site/stadium	Score	Win	Loss	Save	TV	Attendance	Overall record	SEC record
May 1	at No. 1 Tennessee	19	Lindsey Nelson Stadium	**L** 3-5	Joyce (2-1)	**Gonzalez** (6-1)	None		4,462	31-14	12-9
May 6	No. 3 Arkansas	18	Plainsman Park	**L** 8-11	Taylor (4-0)	**Skipper** (4-2)	None		3,738	31-15	12-10
May 7	No. 3 Arkansas	18	Plainsman Park	**W** 5-3	**Swilling** (2-2)	Tygart (2-2)	None		3,875	32-15	13-10
May 8	No. 3 Arkansas	18	Plainsman Park	**L** 4-7	Wiggins (6-1)	**Gonzalez** (6-2)	Taylor (2)		3,515	32-16	13-11
May 10	at Troy	20	Riddle–Pace Field; Troy, AL	**W** 11-4	**Isbell** (1-1)	Witcher (3-3)	None		3,212	33-16	13-11
May 13	Alabama	20	Plainsman Park	**W** 3-2	**Armstrong** (1-0)	McMillan (4-4)	**Burkhalter** (12)		4,096	34-16	14-11
May 14	Alabama	20	Plainsman Park	**W** 6-4	**Swilling** (3-2)	Ray (1-4)	**Allsup** (2)		4,096	35-16	15-11
May 15	Alabama		Plainsman Park	No Contest							
May 17	vs. Samford	18	Hoover Metropolitan Stadium; Hoover, AL	**W** 8-4	**Skipper** (5-2)	Fryman (0-1)	None		2,345	36-16	15-11
May 20 (DH)	at Kentucky	18	Kentucky Proud Park; Lexington, KY	**L** 1-5	Harper (3-1)	**Barnett** (2-2)	Harney (2)			36-17	15-12
May 20 (DH)	at Kentucky	18	Kentucky Proud Park	**W** 6-3	**Bright** (3-4)	Hudepohl (1-2)	**Burkhalter** (13)		2,734	37-17	16-12
May 21	at Kentucky		Kentucky Proud Park	**L** 3-6	Guilfoil (2-1)	**Skipper** (5-3)	None		2,355	37-18	16-13

Postseason

SEC Tournament
Date	Opponent	Seed/Rank	Site/stadium	Score	Win	Loss	Save	TV	Attendance	Overall record	NCAAT Record
May 25	(12) Kentucky	20 (5)	Hoover Metropolitan Stadium	**L** 1-3	Guilfoil (3-1)	**Burkhalter** (4-2)	None		5,742	37-19	0-1

NCAA Tournament - Auburn Regional
Date	Opponent	Seed/Rank	Site/stadium	Score	Win	Loss	Save	TV	Attendance	Overall record	NCAAT Record
June 3	(4) Southeastern Louisiana	14 (1)	Plainsman Park	**W** 19-7	**Bright** (4-4)	Guth (4-2)	None		4,096	38-19	1-0
June 4	(3) Florida State	14 (1)	Plainsman Park	**W** 21-7	**Gonzalez** (7-2)	Hubbart (8-3)	None		4,096	39-19	2-0
June 5	(2) UCLA	14 (1)	Plainsman Park	**W** 11-4	**Barnett** (3-2)	Hepp (1-2)	None		4,096	40-19	3-0

NCAA Tournament - Corvallis Super Regional
Date	Opponent	Seed/Rank	Site/stadium	Score	Win	Loss	Save	TV	Attendance	Overall record	NCAAT Record
June 11	at No. 3 Oregon State	14	Goss Stadium at Coleman Field; Corvallis, OR	**W** 19-7	**Sheehan** (2-0)	Pfennigs (4-1)	**Burkhalter** (14)		4,112	41-19	1-0
June 12	at No. 3 Oregon State	14	Goss Stadium at Coleman Field	**L** 3-4	Hjerpe (11-2)	**Gonzalez** (7-3)	Ferrer (3)		4,101	41-20	1-1
June 13	at No. 3 Oregon State	14	Goss Stadium at Coleman Field	**W** 4-3	**Skipper** (6-3)	Hunter (2-2)	**Burkhalter** (15)		4,174	42-20	2-1

College World Series
Date	Opponent	Seed/Rank	Site/stadium	Score	Win	Loss	Save	TV	Attendance	Overall record	NCAAT Record
June 18	Ole Miss	14	Charles Schwab Field; Omaha, NE	**L** 1-5	DeLucia (7-2)	**Gonzalez** (7-4)	None		25,217	42-21	0-1
June 20	No. 2 Stanford	14	Charles Schwab Field	**W** 6-2	**Bright** (5-2)	Mathews (9-2)	**Burkhalter** (16)		23,594	43-21	1-1
June 21	Arkansas	14	Charles Schwab Field	**L** 1-11	McEntire (2-2)	**Barnett** (3-3)	None		24,636	43-22	1-2

Legend: = Win = Loss = Canceled
Bold = Auburn team member
Rankings are based on the team's current ranking in the D1Baseball poll.

== See also ==
- 2022 Auburn Tigers softball team
