= 2022 Vanderbilt Commodores baseball team =

University Baseball Team

2022 Vanderbilt Commodores baseball

NCAA Corvallis Regional, 3–2
- Conference: Southeastern Conference
- Eastern Division
- Record: 39–23 (14–16 SEC)
- Head coach: Tim Corbin (20th season)
- Assistant coaches: Scott Brown; Mike Baxter
- Home stadium: Hawkins Field

2022 Southeastern Conference baseball standings
	Conf.				Overall
Team	W		L	PCT	W		L	PCT
Eastern
No. 9 Tennessee ^{x}‍†‍‡‍^{y}	25	–	5	.833	57	–	9	.864
No. 21 Florida ‍‍‍^{y}	15	–	15	.500	42	–	24	.636
Georgia ‍‍‍^{y}	15	–	15	.500	36	–	23	.610
Vanderbilt ‍‍‍^{y}	14	–	16	.467	39	–	23	.629
South Carolina ‍‍‍	13	–	17	.433	27	–	28	.491
Kentucky ‍‍‍	12	–	18	.400	33	–	26	.559
Missouri ‍‍‍	10	–	20	.333	28	–	23	.549
Western
No. 3 Texas A&M ^{x}‍‍‍^{y}	19	–	11	.633	44	–	20	.688
No. 4 Arkansas ‍‍‍^{y}	18	–	12	.600	46	–	21	.687
No. 25 LSU ‍‍‍^{y}	17	–	13	.567	40	–	22	.645
No. 7 Auburn ‍‍‍^{y}	16	–	13	.552	43	–	22	.662
No. 1 Ole Miss ‍‍‍^{y}	14	–	16	.467	42	–	23	.646
Alabama ‍‍‍	12	–	17	.414	31	–	27	.534
Mississippi State ‍‍‍	9	–	21	.300	26	–	30	.464
x – Division champion † – Conference champion ‡ – Tournament champion y – Invited to the NCAA tournament Rankings from D1Baseball

The 2022 Vanderbilt Commodores baseball team represented Vanderbilt University in the 2022 NCAA Division I baseball season. The Commodores played their home games at Hawkins Field.

== Previous season ==
The Commodores finished 49–18, 19–10 in the SEC to finish in second place in the East division. They hosted the 2021 Nashville Regional and finished 3–0. The Commodores then hosted East Carolina in the Nashville Super Regional, winning the first two games to advance to the College World Series. The Commodores advanced to the Championship Series of the CWS, finishing as Runner-up to Mississippi State.

== Schedule and results ==
2022 Vanderbilt Commodores baseball game log
Regular season (35–19)

February (5–2)
Date	Opponent	Rank	Site/stadium	Score	Win	Loss	Save	TV	Attendance	Overall record	SEC record
February 18	No. 7 Oklahoma State*	No. 3	Hawkins Field; Nashville, TN	**W** 3–0	**McElvain** (1–0)	Campbell (0–1)	**Schultz** (1)	SECN+	3,802	1–0	—
February 19	No. 7 Oklahoma State*	No. 3	Hawkins Field	**L** 3–4	Phansalkar (1–0)	**Maldonado** (0–1)	Martin (1)	SECN+	3,802	1–1	—
February 20	No. 7 Oklahoma State*	No. 3	Hawkins Field	**L** 5–7	Martin (1–0)	**Schultz** (0–1)	None	ESPNU	3,802	1–2	—
February 22	North Alabama*	No. 5	Hawkins Field	**Canceled (inclement weather)**						1–2	—
February 23	Evansville*	No. 5	Hawkins Field	**W** 9–0	**Futrell** (1–0)	Denu (0–1)	None	SECN+	854	2–2	—
February 25	Army*	No. 5	Hawkins Field	**W** 7–2	**Reilly** (1–0)	Gresham (0–1)	None	SECN+	3,609	3–2	—
February 26	Army*	No. 5	Hawkins Field	**W** 10–7	**Holton** (1–0)	Loricco (0–1)	None	SECN+	3,671	4–2	—
February 27	Army*	No. 5	Hawkins Field	**W** 6–0	**Maldonado** (1–1)	Ruggieri (0–2)	None	SECN+	3,727	5–2	—

March (15–2)
Date	Opponent	Rank	Site/stadium	Score	Win	Loss	Save	TV	Attendance	Overall record	SEC record
March 1	Central Arkansas*	No. 5	Hawkins Field	**W** 5–2	**Futrell** (2–0)	Shoultz (0–1)	**Schultz** (2)	SECN+	3,569	6–2	—
March 4	at Hawaii*	No. 5	Les Murakami Stadium; Honolulu, HI	**W** 9–2	**McElvain** (2–0)	Atkins (0–1)	None	OC16	3,681	7–2	—
March 5	at Hawaii*	No. 5	Les Murakami Stadium	**W** 12–1^{7}	**Holton** (2–0)	Archer (0–2)	None	OC16	1,214	8–2	—
March 5	at Hawaii*	No. 5	Les Murakami Stadium	**W** 13–1	**Owen** (1–0)	Gustin (0–2)	None	OC16	3,160	9–2	—
March 6	at Hawaii*	No. 5	Les Murakami Stadium	**W** 2–1	**Futrell** (3–0)	Gustin (0–2)	**Schultz** (3)	OC16	2,741	10–2	—
March 11	Wagner*	No. 4	Hawkins Field	**W** 12–7	**Reilly** (1–0)	Duquette (0–1)	None	SECN+	3,416	11–2	—
March 12	Wagner*	No. 4	Hawkins Field	**W** 13–0	**Holton** (3–0)	Merkel (0–2)	None	SECN+	3,481	12–2	—
March 13	Wagner*	No. 4	Hawkins Field	**W** 15–5	**Owen** (2–0)	Crouse (0–1)	None	SECN+	3,674	13–2	—
March 15	Michigan*	No. 4	Hawkins Field	**W** 5–4	**Schultz** (1–1)	Weiss (0–2)	None	SECN+	3,802	14–2	—
March 18	Missouri	No. 4	Hawkins Field	**W** 15–2	**McElvain** (3–0)	Miles (2–1)	None	SECN+	3,802	15–2	1–0
March 19	Missouri	No. 4	Hawkins Field	**W** 6–0	**Holton** (4–0)	Wall (0–1)	None	SECN+	3,802	16–2	2–0
March 20	Missouri	No. 4	Hawkins Field	**W** 7–4	**Berkwich** (1–0)	Landry (1–1)	**Schultz** (4)	SECN	3,802	17–2	3–0
March 22	vs. Belmont*	No. 4	First Horizon Park; Nashville, TN	**W** 13–4	**Futrell** (4–0)	C. Schultz (0–1)	None	WZTV	8,283	18–2	—
March 24	at South Carolina	No. 4	Founders Park; Columbia, SC	**W** 10–0	**McElvain** (4–0)	Hall (0–4)	None	SECN+	6,608	19–2	4–0
March 25	at South Carolina	No. 4	Founders Park	**L** 2–8	Sanders (4–1)	**Holton** (4–1)	None	SECN	7,647	19–3	4–1
March 26	at South Carolina	No. 4	Founders Park	**L** 6–8	Hunter (4–2)	**Owen** (2–1)	Austin (1)	SECN+	8,032	19–4	4–2
March 29	vs. Lipscomb*	No. 9	First Horizon Park	**W** 7–1	**Futrell** (5–0)	Witzke (0–1)	None	WZTV	2,344	20–4	—

April (9–9)
Date	Opponent	Rank	Site/stadium	Score	Win	Loss	Save	TV	Attendance	Overall record	SEC record
April 1	No. 1 Tennessee	No. 9	Hawkins Field	**L** 2–6	Burns (6–0)	**McElvain** (4–1)	None	ESPN2	3,802	20–5	4–3
April 2	No. 1 Tennessee	No. 9	Hawkins Field	**L** 2–5	Dollander (5–0)	**Holton** (4–2)	Walsh (4)	SECN	3,802	20–6	4–4
April 3	No. 1 Tennessee	No. 9	Hawkins Field	**L** 0–5	Beam (6–0)	Reilly (2–1)	None	SECN+	3,802	20–7	4–5
April 5	Austin Peay*	No. 16	Hawkins Field	**W** 12–2	**Futrell** (6–0)	Loose (0–2)	None	SECN+	3,314	21–7	—
April 8	at No. 22 Auburn	No. 16	Plainsman Park; Auburn, AL	**L** 1–5	Skipper (3–0)	**McElvain** (4–2)	Burkhalter (7)	SECN+	3,925	21–8	4–6
April 9	at No. 22 Auburn	No. 16	Plainsman Park	**W** 19–4	**Cunningham** (1-0)	Bright (2-3)	None	SECN+	4,096	22–8	5–6
April 10	at No. 22 Auburn	No. 16	Plainsman Park	**L** 2–8	Gonzalez (4-0)	**Reilly** (2-2)	None	SECN+	3,796	22–9	5–7
April 12	Western Kentucky*	No. 17	Hawkins Field	**W** 7–4	**Futrell** (7-0)	Stofel (0-4)	**Little** (1)	SECN+	3,777	23–9	—
April 15	No. 18 Florida	No. 17	Hawkins Field	**W** 5–4	**Schultz** (2–1)	Purnell (3-3)	None		3,802	24–9	6–7
April 16	No. 18 Florida	No. 17	Hawkins Field	**W** 8–6	**Maldonado** (2-1)	Nesbitt (0-2)	None		3,802	25–9	7–7
April 17	No. 18 Florida	No. 17	Hawkins Field	**L** 3–4^{10}	Nesbitt (1-2)	**Little** (0-1)	None		3,802	25–10	7–8
April 19	Tennessee Tech*	No. 19	Hawkins Field	**W** 7–0	**Futrell** (8-0)	Bro. Smith (0-2)	None	SECN+	3,788	26–10	—
April 22	at Kentucky	No. 19	Kentucky Proud Park; Lexington, KY	**W** 10–0	**McElvain** (5-2)	Hazelwood (1-1)	None		2,506	27–10	8–8
April 23	at Kentucky	No. 19	Kentucky Proud Park	**L** 2–3	Lee (1-0)	**Holton** (4-3)	None		2,394	27–11	8–9
April 24	at Kentucky	No. 19	Kentucky Proud Park	**W** 5–3	**Cunningham** (2-0)	Logue (1-4)	**Schultz** (6)		2,833	28–11	9–9
April 28	No. 21 Texas A&M	No. 22	Hawkins Field	**L** 1–5	Dettmer (5-2)	**McElvain** (5-3)	Palisch (4)		3,802	28–12	9–10
April 29	No. 21 Texas A&M	No. 22	Hawkins Field	**W** 11–1	**Holton** (5-3)	Dallas (4-3)	**Little** (2)		3,802	29–12	10–10
April 30	No. 21 Texas A&M	No. 22	Hawkins Field	**L** 4–12	Menefee (2-2)	**Cunningham** (2-1)	None		3,802	29–13	10–11

May (6–6)
Date	Opponent	Rank	Site/stadium	Score	Win	Loss	Save	TV	Attendance	Overall record	SEC record
May 3	No. 10 Louisville*	No. 23	Hawkins Field	**L** 0–1	Phillips (4-1)	**Futrell** (8-1)	Prosecky (9)		3,802	29–14	—
May 6	at No. 16 Georgia	No. 23	Foley Field; Athens, GA	**W** 11–9	**Little** (1–1)	Crisp (1–3)	**Schultz** (7)		3,217	30–14	11–11
May 7	at No. 16 Georgia	No. 23	Foley Field	**L** 7–13	Cannon (9–1)	**Reilly** (2–3)	None		3,405	30–15	11–12
May 8	at No. 16 Georgia	No. 23	Foley Field	**W** 4–0	**Holton** (6–3)	Sullivan (3–3)	None		3,115	31–15	12–12
May 10	Indiana State*	No. 21	Hawkins Field	**W** 8–7^{11}	**Schultz** (3–1)	Spencer (1–3)	None	SECN+	3,696	32–15	—
May 13	at No. 4 Arkansas	No. 21	Baum–Walker Stadium; Fayetteville, AR	**W** 9–6^{10}	**Schultz** (4–1)	Tygart (2–3)	None		11,772	33–15	13–12
May 15	at No. 4 Arkansas	No. 21	Baum–Walker Stadium	**L** 6–11	Morris (5–0)	**McElvain** (5–4)	McEntire (1)		11,761	33–16	13–13
May 15	at No. 4 Arkansas	No. 21	Baum–Walker Stadium	**W** 5–0^{7}	**Holton** (7–3)	Wiggins (6–2)	None		10,806	34–16	14–13
May 17	Middle Tennessee*	No. 24	Hawkins Field	**W** 7–2	**Moore** (1–0)	Sells (4–2)	None	SECN+	3,802	35–16	—
May 19	No. 20 LSU	No. 24	Hawkins Field	**L** 2–13	Hilliard (6–1)	**Futrell** (8–2)	Reyzelman (3)		3,802	35–17	14–14
May 20	No. 20 LSU	No. 24	Hawkins Field	**L** 3–8	Floyd (5–3)	**Little** (1–2)	None		3,802	35–18	14–15
May 21	No. 20 LSU	No. 24	Hawkins Field	**L** 10–21	Collins (3–1)	**Schultz** (4–2)	None		3,802	35–19	14–16

Postseason (4–4)

SEC Tournament (1–2)
Date	Opponent	Seed	Site/stadium	Score	Win	Loss	Save	TV	Attendance	Overall record	SECT Record
May 24	vs. (9) No. 25 Ole Miss	(8)	Hoover Metropolitan Stadium; Hoover, AL	**W** 3–1	**Holton** (8–3)	DeLucia (5–2)	**Little** (3)	SECN	5,506	36–19	1–0
May 26	vs. (1) No. 1 Tennessee	(8)	Hoover Metropolitan Stadium	**L** 1–10	Sewell (6–1)	**Futrell** (8–3)	None'	SECN	9,697	36–20	1–1
May 27	vs. (10) Kentucky	(8)	Hoover Metropolitan Stadium	**L** 2–10	Harper (4–1)	**McElvain** (5–5)	Guilfoil (6)	SECN	5,743	36–21	1–2

NCAA Corvallis Regional (3–2)
Date	Opponent	Seed	Site/stadium	Score	Win	Loss	Save	TV	Attendance	Overall record	NCAAT record
June 3	vs. (3) San Diego	(2) No. 24	Goss Stadium; Corvallis, OR	**L** 2–3	Mautz (10–2)	**Holton** (8–4)	Churchill (4)	ESPN+	3,424	36–22	0–1
June 4	vs. (4) New Mexico State	(2) No. 24	Goss Stadium	**W** 21–1	**McElvain** (6–5)	Cortes (4–5)	None	ESPN+	3,388	37–22	1–1
June 5	vs. (3) San Diego	(2) No. 24	Goss Stadium	**W** 14–4	**Maldonado** (3–1)	Romero (4–4)	None	ESPN+	3,411	38–22	2–1
June 5	at (1) No. 3 Oregon State	(2) No. 24	Goss Stadium	**W** 8–1	**Futrell** (9–3)	Kmatz (8–2)	**Schultz** (8)	ESPN+	4,025	39–22	3–1
June 6	at (1) No. 3 Oregon State	(2) No. 24	Goss Stadium	**L** 6–7	Sebby (2–2)	**Moore** (1–1)	Hjerpe (1)	ESPN+	3,828	39–23	3–2

Legend: = Win = Loss = Canceled
Bold = Vanderbilt team member
Rankings are based on the team's current ranking in the D1Baseball poll.

== Corvallis Regional ==
Corvallis Regional Teams
(1) No. 3 Oregon State Beavers	(2) Vanderbilt Commodores	(3) San Diego Toreros	(4) New Mexico State Aggies

First round
1	3 Oregon State	5
4	New Mexico State	4^{10}
3	San Diego	3
2	Vanderbilt	2
Lower round 1
4	New Mexico State	1
2	Vanderbilt	21

Semi-finals
1	3 Oregon State	12
3	San Diego	3
Lower final
2	Vanderbilt	14
3	San Diego	4

Finals
1	3 Oregon State	1	7
2	Vanderbilt	8	6
