= 2022 Florida Gators baseball team =

American college baseball season

2022 Florida Gators baseball

Gainesville Regional, 3–2
- Conference: Southeastern Conference
- Eastern Division

Ranking
- Coaches: No. 21
- CB: No. 27
- Record: 42–24 (15–15 SEC)
- Head coach: Kevin O'Sullivan (15th season)
- Assistant coaches: Craig Bell; Chuck Jeroloman
- Home stadium: Condron Ballpark (Note: Florida Ballpark was renamed to Condron Ballpark on April 22, 2022.)

2022 Southeastern Conference baseball standings
	Conf.				Overall
Team	W		L	PCT	W		L	PCT
Eastern
No. 9 Tennessee ^{x}‍†‍‡‍^{y}	25	–	5	.833	57	–	9	.864
No. 21 Florida ‍‍‍^{y}	15	–	15	.500	42	–	24	.636
Georgia ‍‍‍^{y}	15	–	15	.500	36	–	23	.610
Vanderbilt ‍‍‍^{y}	14	–	16	.467	39	–	23	.629
South Carolina ‍‍‍	13	–	17	.433	27	–	28	.491
Kentucky ‍‍‍	12	–	18	.400	33	–	26	.559
Missouri ‍‍‍	10	–	20	.333	28	–	23	.549
Western
No. 3 Texas A&M ^{x}‍‍‍^{y}	19	–	11	.633	44	–	20	.688
No. 4 Arkansas ‍‍‍^{y}	18	–	12	.600	46	–	21	.687
No. 25 LSU ‍‍‍^{y}	17	–	13	.567	40	–	22	.645
No. 7 Auburn ‍‍‍^{y}	16	–	13	.552	43	–	22	.662
No. 1 Ole Miss ‍‍‍^{y}	14	–	16	.467	42	–	23	.646
Alabama ‍‍‍	12	–	17	.414	31	–	27	.534
Mississippi State ‍‍‍	9	–	21	.300	26	–	30	.464
x – Division champion † – Conference champion ‡ – Tournament champion y – Invited to the NCAA tournament Rankings from D1Baseball

The 2022 Florida Gators baseball team represented the University of Florida in the sport of baseball during the 2022 college baseball season. Florida competed in the Eastern Division of the Southeastern Conference (SEC). Home games were played at Condron Ballpark on the university's Gainesville, Florida, campus, in the second season at the ballpark. The team was coached by Kevin O'Sullivan in his fifteenth season as Florida's head coach. The Gators entered the season looking to return to the College World Series after an early regional exit from the 2021 NCAA tournament.

== Previous season ==
The 2021 Gators entered the season as the unanimous No. 1 team, but stumbled to a 17–13 SEC record to enter the SEC tournament as the sixth seed, where they made the semifinals before being eliminated by eventual tournament runner-up Tennessee. The Gators were then selected to host a regional in the 2021 NCAA Division I baseball tournament in the Austin Super Regional, but were eliminated in only two games, suffering a 19–1 loss to South Alabama, who scored 10 runs with two outs in the sixth inning.

== Personnel ==
=== Coaching staff ===
2022 Florida Gators coaching staff
Name	Position	Seasons at Florida	Alma mater
Kevin O'Sullivan	Head coach	15	Virginia (1991)
Craig Bell	Assistant coach	15	North Florida (1989)
Chuck Jeroloman	Assistant coach	3	Auburn (2005)
David Kopp	Volunteer assistant coach	1	Clemson (2007)
Austin Langworthy	Student assistant coach	1	Florida (2020)
Shawn Burke	Strength & conditioning coach	1	Rochester (2014)

== Schedule ==
Legend
	Florida win
	Florida loss
	Postponement
**Bold**	Florida team member

2022 Florida Gators baseball game log
Regular season

February (6–2)
Date	Opponent	Rank	Stadium Site	Score	Win	Loss	Save	Attendance	Overall Record	SEC Record
February 18	Liberty	No. 9	Florida Ballpark; Gainesville, FL	**W** 7–2	**H. Barco** (1–0)	J. Adametz III (0–1)	**R. Slater** (1)	6,463	1–0	–
February 19	Liberty	No. 9	Florida Ballpark	**L** 4–6	D. Erickson (1–0)	**B. Sproat** (0–1)	C. Hungate (1)	6,350	1–1	–
February 20	Liberty	No. 9	Florida Ballpark	**L** 3–5	J. Beamon (1–0)	**P. Abner** (0–1)	C. Hungate (2)	5,377	1–2	–
February 22	at Stetson	No. 15	Conrad Park; DeLand, FL	**W** 8–1	**N. Ficarrotta** (1–0)	A. DeFabbia (0–1)	None	1,622	2–2	–
February 23	North Florida	No. 15	Florida Ballpark	**W** 3–1	**B. Sproat** (1–1)	D. Kilfoyl (0–1)	**R. Slater** (2)	4,507	3–2	–
February 25	Georgia State	No. 15	Florida Ballpark	**W** 4–1	**H. Barco** (2–0)	B. Kaminer (0–1)	**N. Ficarrotta** (1)	5,571	4–2	–
February 26	Georgia State	No. 15	Florida Ballpark	**W** 13–4	**B. Purnell** (1–0)	R. Watson (0–1)	None	6,511	5–2	–
February 27	Georgia State	No. 15	Florida Ballpark	**W** 12–1	**N. Ficarrotta** (2–0)	R. Acosta (0–1)	None	5,100	6–2	–

March (12–6)
Date	Opponent	Rank	Stadium Site	Score	Win	Loss	Save	Attendance	Overall Record	SEC Record
March 1	at North Florida	No. 14	Harmon Stadium; Jacksonville, FL	**W** 11–2	**C. Finnvold** (1–0)	R. Jean (0–1)	None	1,328	7–2	–
March 2	Florida A&M	No. 14	Florida Ballpark	**W** 17–0	**G. Milchin** (1–0)	S. Host (0–2)	None	4,424	8–2	–
March 4	at No. 22 Miami (FL); Rivalry	No. 14	Alex Rodriguez Park; Coral Gables, FL	**L** 2–5	C. Palmquist (3–0)	**H. Barco** (2–1)	A. Walters (3)	3,482	8–3	–
March 5	at No. 22 Miami (FL); Rivalry	No. 14	Alex Rodriguez Park	**W** 8–1	**B. Sproat** (2–1)	K. Ligon (1–1)	**N. Ficarrotta** (2)	3,419	9–3	–
March 6	at No. 22 Miami (FL); Rivalry	No. 14	Alex Rodriguez Park	**W** 11–3	**B. Purnell** (2–0)	J. Garland (2–1)	None	3,356	10–3	–
March 8	Jacksonville	No. 11	Florida Ballpark	**W** 1–0	**R. Slater** (1–0)	M. Darrell-Hick (0–1)	**N. Ficarrotta** (3)	4,054	11–3	–
March 9	Jacksonville	No. 11	Florida Ballpark	Postponed (rain) Makeup: Never rescheduled						
March 11	Seton Hall	No. 11	Florida Ballpark	Postponed (rain) Makeup: March 12 as a split doubleheader						
March 12 (1)	Seton Hall	No. 11	Florida Ballpark	**W** 16–4	**H. Barco** (3–1)	H. Waldis (0–3)	None	4,113	12–3	–
March 12 (2)	Seton Hall	No. 11	Florida Ballpark	**W** 11–9	**B. Sproat** (3–1)	D. Conover (0–1)	**B. Neely** (1)	4,528	13–3	–
March 13	Seton Hall	No. 11	Florida Ballpark	**L** 4–6	B. O'Neill (1–2)	**N. Pogue** (0–1)	J. Cinnella (1)	4,743	13–4	–
March 15	No. 8 Florida State; Rivalry	No. 9	Florida Ballpark	Postponed (rain) Makeup: May 17						
March 18	at Alabama	No. 9	Sewell–Thomas Stadium; Tuscaloosa, AL	**W** 6–4	**H. Barco** (4–1)	G. McMillan (2–1)	**B. Purnell** (1)	2,774	14–4	1–0
March 19	at Alabama	No. 9	Sewell–Thomas Stadium	**W** 13–6	**R. Slater** (2–0)	H. Furtado (2–2)	None	3,745	15–4	2–0
March 20	at Alabama	No. 9	Sewell–Thomas Stadium	**L** 7–8	J. McNairy (4–0)	**B. Purnell** (2–1)	None	3,238	15–5	2–1
March 22	Bethune–Cookman	No. 8	Florida Ballpark	**W** 3–2	**P. Abner** (1–1)	J. Gonzalez (0–3)	**K. Hartman** (1)	4,489	16–5	–
March 25	No. 21 LSU	No. 8	Florida Ballpark	**W** 8–2	**H. Barco** (5–1)	B. Money (2–1)	None	6,226	17–5	3–1
March 26	No. 21 LSU	No. 8	Florida Ballpark	**L** 4–16	M. Hilliard (2–0)	**B. Sproat** (3–2)	None	8,306	17–6	3–2
March 27	No. 21 LSU	No. 8	Florida Ballpark	**L** 2–11	G. Taylor (2–0)	**R. Slater** (2–1)	None	5,746	17–7	3–3
March 29	vs. No. 5 Florida State; Rivalry	No. 14	121 Financial Park; Jacksonville, FL	**W** 6–3	**B. Neely** (1–0)	C. Montgomery (3–1)	**B. Purnell** (2)	8,122	18–7	–
March 31	at No. 23 Georgia	No. 14	Foley Field; Athens, GA	**L** 6–7	J. Woods (1–0)	**B. Purnell** (2–2)	None	3,610	18–8	3–4

April (7–9)
Date	Opponent	Rank	Stadium Site	Score	Win	Loss	Save	Attendance	Overall Record	SEC Record
April 1	at No. 23 Georgia	No. 14	Foley Field	**L** 1–6	J. Cannon (6–1)	**B. Sproat** (3–3)	J. Gowen (3)	3,671	18–9	3–5
April 2	at No. 23 Georgia	No. 14	Foley Field	**L** 8–14	W. Pearson (1–1)	**T. Nesbitt** (0–1)	J. Woods (2)	3,696	18–10	3–6
April 5	Florida A&M		Florida Ballpark	**W** 13–3	**N. Pogue** (1–1)	D. Tease (0–4)	None	4,336	19–10	–
April 7	No. 2 Arkansas		Florida Ballpark	**L** 1–8	C. Noland (5–1)	**H. Barco** (5–2)	Z. Vermillion (2)	4,643	19–11	3–7
April 8	No. 2 Arkansas		Florida Ballpark	**W** 7–2	**B. Sproat** (4–3)	H. Smith (5–2)	**B. Purnell** (3)	5,795	20–11	4–7
April 9	No. 2 Arkansas		Florida Ballpark	**W** 9–7	**B. Purnell** (3–2)	B. Tygart (1–1)	None	5,806	21–11	5–7
April 12	at Florida State; Rivalry	No. 23	Dick Howser Stadium; Tallahassee, FL	**L** 0–5	C. Whittaker (1–1)	**N. Pogue** (1–2)	None	5,916	21–12	–
April 15	at Vanderbilt	No. 23	Hawkins Field; Nashville, TN	**L** 4–5	T. Schultz (2–1)	**B. Purnell** (3–3)	None	3,802	21–13	5–8
April 16	at Vanderbilt	No. 23	Hawkins Field	**L** 6–8	N. Maldonado (2–1)	**T. Nesbitt** (0–2)	None	3,802	21–14	5–9
April 17	at Vanderbilt	No. 23	Hawkins Field	**W** 4–3^{10}	**T. Nesbitt** (1–2)	C. Little (0–1)	None	3,802	22–14	6–9
April 19	Stetson		Florida Ballpark	**W** 10–8	**N. Ficarrotta** (2–0)	A. DeFabbia (0–2)	**B. Purnell** (4)	6,170	23–14	–
April 22	No. 1 Tennessee		Condron Ballpark	**L** 2–8	C. Burns (7–1)	**R. Slater** (2–2)	None	5,575	23–15	6–10
April 23	No. 1 Tennessee		Condron Ballpark	**L** 0–3	B. Tidwell (1–0)	**B. Sproat** (4–4)	C. Sewell (1)	6,787	23–16	6–11
April 24	No. 1 Tennessee		Condron Ballpark	**L** 4–6^{11}	R. Welsh (2–0)	**T. Nesbitt** (1–3)	None	5,470	23–17	6–12
April 29	Kentucky		Condron Ballpark	**W** 9–2	**B. Sproat** (5–4)	M. Hazelwood (1–2)	None	4,836	24–17	7–12
April 30	Kentucky		Condron Ballpark	**W** 9–1	**B. Neely** (2–0)	Z. Lee (1–1)	None	5,245	25–17	8–12

May (10–3)
Date	Opponent	Rank	Stadium Site	Score	Win	Loss	Save	Attendance	Overall Record	SEC Record
May 1	Kentucky		Condron Ballpark	**L** 1–8	S. Harney (5–3)	**R. Slater** (2–3)	None	4,542	25–18	8–13
May 3	South Florida		Condron Ballpark	**W** 18–3	**N. Pogue** (2–2)	O. Kerkering (4–5)	None	4,330	26–18	–
May 6	at Mississippi State		Dudy Noble Field; Starkville, MS	**W** 8–6	**B. Sproat** (6–4)	B. Smith (3–4)	**R. Slater** (3)	11,533	27–18	9–13
May 7	at Mississippi State		Dudy Noble Field	**W** 9–3	**R. Slater** (3–3)	K. Hunt (2–3)	None	12,297	28–18	10–13
May 8	at Mississippi State		Dudy Noble Field	**W** 6–2	**F. Jameson** (1–0)	P. Kohn (2–1)	None	9,356	29–18	11–13
May 10	Bethune–Cookman		Condron Ballpark	**W** 7–0	**T. Nesbitt** (2–3)	A. Mendez (0–2)	None	3,984	30–18	–
May 13	at Missouri		Taylor Stadium; Columbia, MO	**W** 13–1	**B. Sproat** (7–4)	T. Neubeck (3–3)	None	1,039	31–18	12–13
May 14	at Missouri		Taylor Stadium	**L** 3–5	S. Miles (4–5)	**B. Neely** (2–1)	I. Lohse (3)	1,526	31–19	12–14
May 15	at Missouri		Taylor Stadium	**W** 4–3	**N. Pogue** (3–2)	C. Rustad (3–2)	**R. Slater** (4)	1,026	32–19	13–14
May 17	No. 20 Florida State; Rivalry		Condron Ballpark	**W** 7–5^{10}	**R. Slater** (4–3)	D. Hare (1–3)	None	6,899	33–19	–
May 19	South Carolina		Condron Ballpark	**W** 14–5	**B. Sproat** (8–4)	J. Gilreath (0–3)	None	4,327	34–19	14–14
May 20	South Carolina		Condron Ballpark	**W** 8–0	**B. Neely** (3–1)	N. Hall (3–5)	None	4,992	35–19	15–14
May 21	South Carolina		Condron Ballpark	**L** 1–4	C. Austin (5–1)	**N. Pogue** (3–3)	J. Gilreath (1)	4,811	35–20	15–15

Postseason

SEC Tournament (4–2)
Date	Opponent	Rank	Stadium Site	Score	Win	Loss	Save	Attendance	Overall Record	SECT Record
May 24	vs. (10) South Carolina; First round	(7)	Hoover Metropolitan Stadium; Hoover, AL	**W** 2–1^{10}	**R. Slater** (5–3)	C. Austin (5–2)	None	5,506	36–20	1–0
May 25	vs. No. 5 (2) Texas A&M; Second round	(7)	Hoover Metropolitan Stadium	Postponed (inclement weather) Makeup: May 26						
May 26	vs. No. 5 (2) Texas A&M; Second round	(7)	Hoover Metropolitan Stadium	**L** 0–10^{7}	M. Dallas (5–3)	**B. Neely** (3–2)	J. Menefee (1)	8,251	36–21	1–1
May 27	vs. No. 13 (3) Arkansas; Second round elimination game	(7)	Hoover Metropolitan Stadium	**W** 7–5	**N. Pogue** (4–3)	C. Noland (5–5)	**R. Slater** (5)	5,743	37–21	2–1
May 28 (1)	vs. (11) Alabama; Third round elimination game	(7)	Hoover Metropolitan Stadium	**W** 11–6	**N. Ficarrotta** (4–0)	J. Leger (1–1)	None	7,102	38–21	3–1
May 28 (2)	vs. No. 5 (2) Texas A&M; Semifinal	(7)	Hoover Metropolitan Stadium	**W** 9–0	**T. Manning** (1–0)	R. Prager (1–3)	**F. Jameson** (1)	8,924	39–21	4–1
May 29	vs. No. 1 (1) Tennessee; Championship Game	(7)	Hoover Metropolitan Stadium	**L** 5–8	C. Sewell (7–1)	**C. Finnvold** (1–1)	None	13,270	39–22	4–2

NCAA tournament: Gainesville Regional (3–2)
Date	Opponent	Rank	Stadium Site	Score	Win	Loss	Save	Attendance	Overall Record	Regional Record
June 3	(4) Central Michigan; First round	No. 18 (1)	Condron Ballpark	**W** 7–3	**B. Sproat** (9–4)	A. Taylor (8–4)	**R. Slater** (6)	5,472	40–22	1–0
June 4	No. 9 (2) Oklahoma; Second round	No. 18 (1)	Condron Ballpark	**L** 4–9	D. Sandlin (8–3)	**B. Neely** (3–3)	None	5,000	40–23	1–1
June 5 (1)	(4) Central Michigan; Second round elimination game	No. 18 (1)	Condron Ballpark	**W** 6–5	**R. Slater** (6–3)	G. Navarra (10–3)	None	3,350	41–23	2–1
June 5 (2)	No. 9 (2) Oklahoma; Regional final game 1	No. 18 (1)	Condron Ballpark	**W** 7–2	**C. Finnvold** (2–1)	C. Atwood (2–4)	None	3,439	42–23	3–1
June 6	No. 9 (2) Oklahoma; Regional final game 2	No. 18 (1)	Condron Ballpark	**L** 4–5	C. Martinez (4–3)	**R. Slater** (6–4)	J. Bennett (1)	3,933	42–24	3–2

Schedule source:

*Rankings are based on the team's current ranking in the D1Baseball poll. Parentheses indicate tournament seedings.

== Rankings ==
Ranking movements Legend: ██ Increase in ranking ██ Decrease in ranking — = Not ranked RV = Received votes т = Tied with team above or below
	Week																		
Poll	Pre	1	2	3	4	5	6	7	8	9	10	11	12	13	14	15	16	17	Final
Coaches'	10	10*	16	10	9	7	12т	22	17	RV	RV	RV	RV	RV	RV	22	22*	22*	21
Baseball America	6	19	18	13	13	9	16	—	—	—	—	—	—	—	—	18	18*	18*	22
Collegiate Baseball^	6	13	16	13	13	13	18	—	20	—	—	—	26	28	25	25	27	27	27
NCBWA†	7	17	16	10	10	7	13	23	20	RV	RV	RV	RV	RV	29	20	20	20*	22
D1Baseball	9	15	14	11	9	8	14	—	23	—	—	—	—	—	—	18	18*	18*	21

^ Collegiate Baseball ranked 40 teams in their preseason poll, but only ranked 30 teams weekly during the season.
† NCBWA ranks 30 teams in their preseason poll, but only ranks 25 teams weekly during the season.
* A new poll was not released for this week, so for comparison purposes, the previous week's ranking is inserted in this week's slot.
