= 2022 Georgia Bulldogs baseball team =

American college baseball season

2022 Georgia Bulldogs baseball

Chapel Hill Regional, 1–2
- Conference: Southeastern Conference
- Eastern Division
- CB: No. 28
- Record: 36–23 (15–15 SEC)
- Head coach: Scott Stricklin (9th season)
- Assistant coaches: Scott Daeley; Sean Kenny
- Home stadium: Foley Field

2022 Southeastern Conference baseball standings
	Conf.				Overall
Team	W		L	PCT	W		L	PCT
Eastern
No. 9 Tennessee ^{x}‍†‍‡‍^{y}	25	–	5	.833	57	–	9	.864
No. 21 Florida ‍‍‍^{y}	15	–	15	.500	42	–	24	.636
Georgia ‍‍‍^{y}	15	–	15	.500	36	–	23	.610
Vanderbilt ‍‍‍^{y}	14	–	16	.467	39	–	23	.629
South Carolina ‍‍‍	13	–	17	.433	27	–	28	.491
Kentucky ‍‍‍	12	–	18	.400	33	–	26	.559
Missouri ‍‍‍	10	–	20	.333	28	–	23	.549
Western
No. 3 Texas A&M ^{x}‍‍‍^{y}	19	–	11	.633	44	–	20	.688
No. 4 Arkansas ‍‍‍^{y}	18	–	12	.600	46	–	21	.687
No. 25 LSU ‍‍‍^{y}	17	–	13	.567	40	–	22	.645
No. 7 Auburn ‍‍‍^{y}	16	–	13	.552	43	–	22	.662
No. 1 Ole Miss ‍‍‍^{y}	14	–	16	.467	42	–	23	.646
Alabama ‍‍‍	12	–	17	.414	31	–	27	.534
Mississippi State ‍‍‍	9	–	21	.300	26	–	30	.464
x – Division champion † – Conference champion ‡ – Tournament champion y – Invited to the NCAA tournament Rankings from D1Baseball

The 2022 Georgia Bulldogs baseball team represented the University of Georgia in the 2022 NCAA Division I baseball season. The Bulldogs played their home games at Foley Field.

== Previous season ==
The Bulldogs finished 31–25, 13–17 in the SEC to finish in fifth place in the East division. They were not invited to the postseason.

== Personnel ==
=== Roster ===
2022 Georgia Bulldogs roster
Pitchers: 5 - Will Pearson – Sophomore; 11 - Nolan Crisp – Junior; 12 - Jonathan Cannon – Junior; 14 - Liam Sullivan – Sophomore; 16 - Will Childers – (redshirt) Sophomore; 17 - Jaden Woods – Sophomore; 18 - Bryce Melear – (redshirt) Sophomore; 21 - Coleman Willis – Freshman; 29 - Charlie Goldstein – (redshirt) Sophomore; 31 - Jack Gowen – Senior; 32 - Michael Polk – Junior; 33 - Patrick Holloman – (redshirt) Freshman; 34 - Garrett Brown – (redshirt) Sophomore; 35 - Hank Bearden – Sophomore; 36 - Jake Poindexter – Freshman; 39 - Chandler Marsh – Freshman; 42 - Glenn Green III – Freshman; 43 - Max DeJong – Sophomore; 47 - Collin Caldwell – Sophomore; 55 - Davis Rokose – (redshirt) Sophomore; 66 - Dylan Ross – Junior	Catchers: 2 - Shane Marshall – Senior; 3 - Bear Madliak – Freshman; 6 - Corey Collins – Sophomore; 13 - Fernando Gonzalez – Sophomore; Infielders: 1 - Buddy Floyd – Junior; 8 - Parks Harber – Sophomore; 9 - Corey Acton – Senior; 15 - Cole Tate – Graduate Student; 24 - Garrett Blaylock – Senior; 28 - Joshua McAllister – (redshirt) Senior; 48 - Dylan Taylor – Freshman	Outfielders: 0 - Josh Stinson – (redshirt) Sophomore; 4 - Randon Jernigan – Senior; 7 - Garrett Spikes – Sophomore; 22 - Dwight Allen II – (redshirt) Freshman; 23 - Connor Tate – Graduate Student; 26 - Trippe Moore III – (redshirt) Freshman; 44 - Ben Anderson – Graduate Student; Utility: 19 - Cole Wagner (1B/P) – Freshman; 20 - Chaney Rogers (1B/OF) – Graduate Student; 25 - Lane Watkins (1B/OF) – (redshirt) Sophomore; 27 - Luke Wagner (P/OF) – Sophomore; 30 - Daniel Braswell (1B/OF) – Freshman; 46 - DJ Radtke (P/1B) – Freshman; 50 - Charlie Condon (1B/OF) – Freshman

=== Coaching staff ===
2022 Georgia bulldogs coaching staff
Name	Position	Seasons at Georgia	Alma mater
Scott Stricklin	Head coach	9	Kent state (1995)
Scott Daeley	Associate head coach/recruiting coordinator	9	Wake Forest (2002)
Sean Kenny	Assistant Coach/Pitching	5	Eastern Michigan (1997)
Brock Bennett	Volunteer Coach	3	Alabama (2011)

== Schedule and results ==
2022 Georgia Bulldogs baseball game log (36-23)
Rankings are based on the team's current ranking in the D1Baseball poll.

Legend: = Win = Loss = Canceled Bold = Georgia team member
Regular season (35-20)

February (7-0)
Date	Opponent	Rank	Site/stadium	Score	Win	Loss	Save	TV	Attendance	Overall record	SEC record
February 18	Albany	No. 16	Foley Field; Athens, GA	**W** 4-2	Cannon (1-0)	Ray (0-1)	**Gowen (1)**	None	2,500	1-0	-
February 19	Albany	No. 16	Foley Field	**W** 7-6	Wagner (1-0)	Connor (0-1)	None	None	2,622	2-0	-
February 20	Albany	No. 16	Foley Field	**W** 9-1	Ross (1-0)	Cregg (0-1)	None	None	1,821	3-0	-
February 22	Wofford	No. 16	Foley Field	**W** 7-1	Wagner (2-0)	Matthew (0-2)	None	None	2,754	4-0	-
February 25	Akron	No. 16	Foley Field	**W** 1-0	Cannon (2-0)	Conor (0-2)	**Caldwell (1)**	SECN+	3,254	5-0	-
February 26 (Doubleheader)	Akron	No. 16	Foley Field	**W** 10-0	Sullivan (1-0)	Taed (0-2)	None	SECN+	N/A	6-0	-
February 26 (Doubleheader)	Akron	No. 16	Foley Field	**W** 7-2	Wagner (3-0)	Jackson (0-1)	None	SECN+	3,498	7-0	-

March (13-6)
Date	Opponent	Rank	Site/stadium	Score	Win	Loss	Save	TV	Attendance	Overall record	SEC record
March 1	vs. Wofford	No. 15	Fluor Field at the West End; Greenville, SC	**W** 7-6	**Caldwell (1-0)**	Rhadans (1-1)	**Gowen (2)**	None	1,253	8-0	-
March 4	at No. 18 Georgia Tech	No. 15	Russ Chandler Stadium; Atlanta, GA	**L** 7-11	Huff (2-0)	**Cannon (2-1)**	None	ACCN+	3,394	8-1	-
March 5	No. 18 Georgia Tech	No. 15	Foley Field	**L** 0-7	Carwile (1-0)	**Sullivan (1-1)**	Finateri (1)	SECN+	3,457	8-2	-
March 6	vs. No. 18 Georgia Tech	No. 15	Coolray Field; Lawrenceville, GA	**W** 12-3	**Wagner (4-0)**	Grissom Jr. (1-2)	None	ACCN+	9,942	9-2	-
March 8	vs. Georgia Southern	No. 20	SRP Park; North Augusta, SC	**L** 5-13	Wray (3-0)	**Polk (0-1)**	None	None	5,765	9-3	-
March 9	at Georgia Southern	No. 20	J. I. Clements Stadium; Statesboro, GA	**W** 5-1	**Marsh (1-0)**	Ross (1-2)	None	SECN	2,747	10-3	-
March 11	Lipscomb	No. 20	Foley Field	**W** 8-3	**Cannon (3-1)**	Kantola (1-1)	None	SECN+	2,616	11-3	-
March 13 (Doubleheader)	Lipscomb	No. 20	Foley Field	**W** 9-2	**Sullivan (2-1)**	Buxton (1-1)	None	SECN+	2,843	12-3	-
March 13 (Doubleheader)	Lipscomb	No. 20	Foley Field	**W** 9-5	**Wagner (5-0)**	Legere (0-1)	None	SECN+	2,770	13-3	-
March 15	USC Upstate	No. 20	Foley Field	**W** 15-3	**Willis (1-0)**	Morgan (1-1)	None	SECN+	2,732	14-3	-
March 18	No. 23Mississippi State	No. 20	Foley Field	**W** 11-0	**Cannon (4-1)**	Johnson (2-1)	None	SECN	3,235	15-3	1-0
March 19	No. 23 Mississippi State	No. 20	Foley Field	**W** 12-11	**Gowen (1-0)**	Smith (1-1)	None	SECN+	3,692	16-3	2-0
March 20	No. 23 Mississippi State	No. 20	Foley Field	**L** 3-20	Smith (4-0)	**Pearson (0-1)**	None	SECN	3,373	16-4	2-1
March 22	at Georgia State	No. 17	Coolray Field	**W** 10-3	**Melear (1-0)**	Reddick (1-1)	None	None	1,054	17-4	-
March 25	at Kentucky	No. 17	Kentucky Proud Park; Lexington, KY	**W** 4-2	**Cannon (5-1)**	Stupp (2-2)	**Woods (1)**	SECN+	1,785	18-4	3-1
March 26	at Kentucky	No. 17	Kentucky Proud Park	**L** 8-10	Harney (4-0)	**Wagner (5-1)**	Guilfoil (2)	SECN+	1,981	18-5	3-2
March 27	at Kentucky	No. 17	Kentucky Proud Park	**L** 5-18	Bosma (3-1)	**Melear (1-1)**	None	SECN	1,819	18-6	3-3
March 29	Georgia Southern	No. 23	Foley Field	**W** 7-2	**Bearden (1-0)**	Madden (0-1)	None	SECN+	3,912	19-6	-
March 31	No. 14Florida	No. 23	Foley Field	**W** 7-6	**Woods (1-0)**	Purnell (2-2	None	ESPN2	3,610	20-6	4-3

April (10-7)
Date	Opponent	Rank	Site/stadium	Score	Win	Loss	Save	TV	Attendance	Overall record	SEC record
April 1	No. 14 Florida	No. 23	Foley Field	**W** 6-1	**Cannon (6-1)**	Sproat (3-3)	**Gowen (3)**	SECN+	3,671	21-6	5-3
April 2	No. 14 Florida	No. 23	Foley Field	**W** 14-8	**Pearson (1-1)**	Nesbitt (0-1)	**Woods (2)**	SECN+	3,696	22-6	6-3
April 5	at Clemson	No. 14	Doug Kingsmore Stadium; Clemson, SC	**L** 3-4	Barlow (1-2)	**Bearden (1-1)**	Ammons (5)	ACCN	4,078	22-7	-
April 8	at South Carolina	No. 14	Founders Park; Columbia, SC	**W** 3-2	**Pearson (2-1)**	Austin (1-1)	**Gowen (4)**	SECN+	6,684	23-7	7-3
April 9	at South Carolina	No. 14	Founders Park	**L** 7-13	Sanders (5-1)	**Brown (0-1)**	Becker (1)	SECN+	7,124	23-8	7-4
April 10	at South Carolina	No. 14	Founders Park	**W** 13-9	**Sullivan (3-1)**	Hunter (5-3)	**Gowen (5)**	SECN	6,024	24-8	8-4
April 12	at Kennesaw State	No. 13	Fred Stillwell Stadium; Kennesaw, GA	**W** 17-15	**Bearden (2-1)**	Holler (3-3)	**Woods (3)**	ESPN+	1,365	25-8	-
April 14	Texas A&M	No. 13	Foley Field	**L** 1-8	Dettmer (3-2)	**Crisp (0-1)**	None	SECN+	3,269	25-9	8-5
April 15	Texas A&M	No. 13	Foley Field	**W** 4-3	**Marsh (2-0)**	Cortez (4-1)	**Gowen (6)**	SECN+	3,391	26-9	9-5
April 16	Texas A&M	No. 13	Foley Field	**L** 9-23	Rudis (2-0)	**Polk (0-2)**	None	SECN+	3,209	26-10	9-6
April 19	Clemson	No. 14	Foley Field	**L** 4-8	Lindley (5-0)	**Pearson (2-2)**	None	SECN+	3,328	26-11	-
April 22	at Alabama	No. 14	Sewell–Thomas Stadium; Tuscaloosa, AL	**W** 4-2	**Crisp (1-1)**	Mcmillan (4-3)	**Gowen (7)**	SECN+	3,442	27-11	10-6
April 23	at Alabama	No. 14	Sewell–Thomas Stadium	**W** 3-0	**Cannon (7-1)**	Mcnairy (4-2)	**Gowen (8)**	SECN+	3,765	28-11	11-6
April 24	at Alabama	No. 14	Sewell–Thomas Stadium	**L** 0-3	Hitt (4-1)	**Sullivan (3-2)**	Ray (5)	ESPN2	3,129	28-12	11-7
April 26	Georgia State	No. 14	Foley Field	**W** 16-1	**Marsh (3-0)**	Lutz (2-1)	None	SECN+	2,882	29-12	-
April 29	at No. 22 LSU	No. 14	Alex Box Stadium; Baton Rouge, LA	**L** 2-6	Hilliard (5-0)	**Crisp (1-2)**	Gervase (4)	SECN+	11,145	29-13	11-8
April 30	at No. 22 LSU	No. 14	Alex Box Stadium	**W** 12-7	**Cannon (8-1)**	Collins (2-1)	**Gowen (9)**	SECN+	11,067	30-13	12-8

May (5-7)
Date	Opponent	Rank	Site/stadium	Score	Win	Loss	Save	TV	Attendance	Overall record	SEC record
May 1	at No. 22 LSU	No. 14	Alex Box Stadium	**L** 3-4	Gervase (2-1)	**Woods (1-1)**	None	SECN+	10,481	30-14	12-9
May 3	Kennesaw State	No. 22	Foley Field	**W** 10-7	**Dejong (1-0)**	Pinson (4-3)	**Gowen (10)**	SECN+	2,909	31-14	-
May 6	Vanderbilt	No. 22	Foley Field	**L** 9-11	Little (1-1)	**Crisp (1-3)**	Schultz (7)	SECN+	3,217	31-15	12-10
May 7	Vanderbilt	No. 22	Foley Field	**W** 13-7	**Cannon (9-1)**	Reilly (2-3)	None	SECN+	3,405	32-15	13-10
May 8	Vanderbilt	No. 22	Foley Field	**L** 0-4	Holton (6-3)	**Sullivan (3-3)**	None	SECN	3,115	32-16	13-11
May 12	at No. 1Tennessee		Lindsey Nelson Stadium; Knoxville, TN	**L** 2-5	Dollander (7-0)	**Crisp (1-4)**	Walsh (6)	ESPNU	4,580	32-17	13-12
May 13	at No. 1 Tennessee		Lindsey Nelson Stadium	**L** 2-9	Sewell (5-1)	Cannon (9-2)	None	SECN	4,420	32-18	13-13
May 14	at No. 1 Tennessee		Lindsey Nelson Stadium	**W** 8-3	**Gowen (2-0)**	Beam (8-1)	None	SECN+	4,536	33-18	14-13
May 17	Presbyterian		Foley Field	**W** 18-3	**Rokose (1-0)**	Art (1-1)	None	SECN+	2,829	34-18	-
May 19	Missouri		Foley Field	**L** 3-11	Miles (5-5)	**Marsh (3-1)**	None	SECN+	2,910	34-19	14-14
May 20	Missouri		Foley Field	**L** 3-10	Landry (4-2)	**Cannon (9-3)**	None	SECN+	3,204	34-20	14-15
May 21	Missouri		Foley Field	**W** 11-10	**Marsh (4-1)**	Marozas (1-4)	None	SECN+	2,883	35-20	15-15

Postseason (1-3)

SEC Tournament (0-1)
Date	Opponent	Seed	Site/stadium	Score	Win	Loss	Save	TV	Attendance	Overall record	SECT Record
May 24	No. 11 Alabama	No. 6	Hoover Metropolitan Stadium; Hoover, AL	**L** 3-5	Hess (3-1)	**Wagner (5-2)**	Ray (7)	SECN	N/A	35-21	0-1

NCAA Tournament (1-2)
Date	Opponent	Site/stadium	Score	Win	Loss	Save	TV	Attendance	Overall record	NCAAT Record
June 3	VCU	Boshamer Stadium; Chapel Hill, NC	**L** 1-8	Davis (5-2)	**Cannon (9-4)**	None	SECN	2,930	35-22	0-1
June 4	Hofstra	Boshamer Stadium	**W** 24-1	**Sullivan (4-3)**	Faello (7-4)	None	SECN	2,889	36-22	1-1
June 5	No. 10 North Carolina	Boshamer Stadium	**L** 5-6	Pry (3-0)	**Wagner (5-3)**	O'brien (5)	ESPNU	3,321	36-23	1-2

=== NCAA Chapel Hill Regional ===
Chapel Hill Regional Teams
(1) North Carolina Tar Heels	(2) Georgia Bulldogs	(3) VCU Rams	(4) Hofstra Pride

First Round
1	**North Carolina**	**15**
4	Hofstra	4
3	**VCU**	**8**
2	Georgia	1
Lower round 1
4	Hofstra	1
2	**Georgia**	**24**

Semi-Finals
1	North Carolina	3
3	**VCU**	**4**
Lower final
1	**North Carolina**	**6**
2	Georgia	5

Finals
3	VCU	8	3
1	North Carolina	**19**	**7**

== Rankings ==
Ranking movements Legend: ██ Increase in ranking ██ Decrease in ranking
	Week																
Poll	Pre	1	2	3	4	5	6	7	8	9	10	11	12	13	14	15	Final
Coaches'	17	17*	13														
Baseball America	14	15	14														
Collegiate Baseball^	33	17	5														
NCBWA†	22	16															
D1Baseball	16	16	15														

^ Collegiate Baseball ranked 40 teams in their preseason poll, but only ranked 30 teams weekly during the season.
† NCBWA ranks 30 teams in their preseason poll, but only ranks 25 teams weekly during the season.
* A new poll was not released for this week, so for comparison purposes, the previous week's ranking is inserted in this week's slot.

== See also ==
- 2022 Georgia Bulldogs softball team
