= Sonny DiChiara =

American baseball player (born 1999)

Auburn Tigers
- First baseman / Coach
- Born: July 29, 1999 (age 27); Homewood, Alabama, U.S.
- Bats: Right Throws: Right

Sonny DiChiara (born July 29, 1999) is an American former professional baseball first baseman who currently serves as a student assistant coach for the Auburn Tigers.

== Amateur career ==
In July 2012, DiChiara discovered he had a chiari malformation, which is a condition in which brain tissue extends into the spinal cord; he later underwent a procedure to keep brain fluid from leaking in to the spinal cord, which prevented possible migraines and paralysis. DiChiara grew up in Hoover, Alabama and attended Hoover High School. In his sophomore year of high school, DiChiara slipped on the mound while pitching in the rain, causing his back to arch and crack in three different places, effectively ending his season. In September of his junior year, DiChiara underwent Tommy John surgery to repair his ulnar collateral ligament, and played primarily as a designated hitter.

DiChiara began his collegiate career at Samford. He was named the Southern Conference Freshman of the Year after hitting 21 home runs and driving in 55 runs. DiChiara was batting .328 before the 2020 season was cut short due to the coronavirus pandemic. As a junior, he batted .273 and led the Southern Conference with 18 home runs. After the season DiChiara transferred to Auburn.

DiChiara entered his senior season at the Tigers' starting first baseman. He was named the Southeastern Conference Co-Player of the Year at the end of the season, sharing the award with Louisiana State University's Dylan Crews.

== Professional career ==
DiChiara was drafted in the fifth round, with the 148th overall selection, of the 2022 Major League Baseball draft by the Los Angeles Angels. He was assigned to the Double-A Rocket City Trash Pandas to start his professional career, and hit .195/.362/.237 with one home run, 10 RBI, and one stolen bases across 36 appearances.

DiChiara returned to Rocket City for the 2023 campaign, making 77 appearances and batting .223/.327/.355 with eight home runs and 38 RBI. He split the 2024 season between the Single-A Inland Empire 66ers, High-A Tri-City Dust Devils, and Triple-A Salt Lake Bees. In 98 appearances for the three affiliates, DiChiara slashed a combined .237/.354/.404 with career-highs in home runs (12) and RBI (60).

DiChiara began the 2025 campaign back with Rocket City, playing in 32 games and batting .130/.273/.280 with four home runs and 11 RBI. DiChiara was released by the Angels organization on June 3, 2025.

On July 2, 2025, DiChiara announced his retirement from professional baseball.

== Coaching career ==
On September 4, 2025, DiChiara returned to Auburn as a student assistant coach.
