= Dylan Crews =

American baseball player (born 2002)

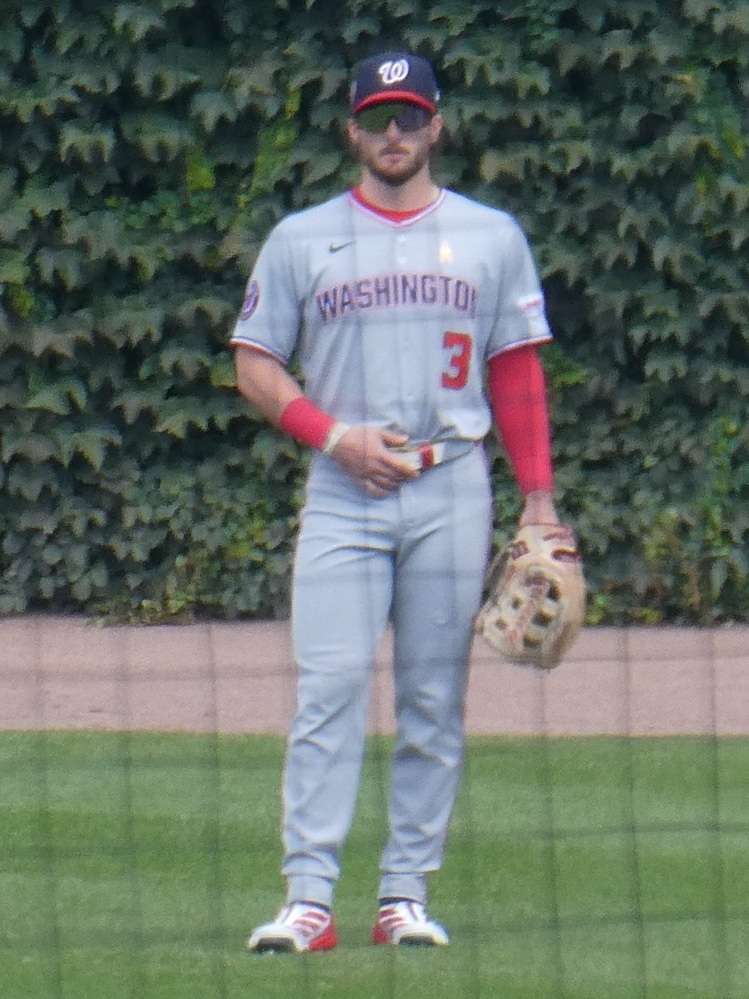
- Crews with the Washington Nationals in 2025

Washington Nationals – No. 3
- Outfielder
- Born: February 26, 2002 (age 24); Altamonte Springs, Florida, U.S.
- Bats: Right Throws: Right

MLB debut
- August 26, 2024, for the Washington Nationals

MLB statistics (through 2026 season)
- Batting average: .217
- Home runs: 26
- Runs batted in: 79
- Stats at Baseball Reference

Teams
- Washington Nationals (2024–present)

Career highlights and awards
- Golden Spikes Award (2023)
Medals
Men's baseball
Representing the United States
Haarlem Baseball Week
Bronze medal – third place	2022	Team

Dylan Gray Crews (born February 26, 2002) is an American professional baseball outfielder for the Washington Nationals of Major League Baseball (MLB). He played college baseball for the LSU Tigers, with whom he won the 2023 College World Series and the Golden Spikes Award. Crews was selected by the Nationals second overall in the 2023 MLB draft and made his MLB debut in 2024.

== Early life ==
Crews was born on February 26, 2002, in Altamonte Springs, Florida, later attending Lake Mary High School in Lake Mary, Florida. During his amateur career, he played for USA Baseball twice, once on their 14U team and once on their 18U team that won a gold medal. As a junior in 2019, he batted .389 with 15 stolen bases. That summer, he played in the Under Armour All-America Baseball Game at Wrigley Field. Although his senior season in 2020 was cut short due to the COVID-19 pandemic, he was considered a top prospect for the 2020 Major League Baseball draft. However, he withdrew his name a week before, announcing he would fulfill his commitment to play college baseball at Louisiana State University.

== College career ==
Crews immediately became LSU's starting right fielder as a freshman in 2021. He started 63 games during the season, batting .362 with 18 home runs, 42 RBIs, 16 doubles, and 12 stolen bases. His 18 home runs were the most ever by a LSU freshman, surpassing Mike Fontenot's previous record of 17. He earned All-American honors and was named National Freshman of the Year by Perfect Game. He was named to the United States national baseball team after the season. He also briefly played for the Sanford River Rats of the Florida Collegiate Summer League. In 2022, Crews shifted to center field. He was named the co-Southeastern Conference Baseball Player of the Year alongside Sonny DiChiara. He finished the season having played in 62 games with a .349/.463/.691 slash line with 22 home runs and 72 RBI. Following the season's end, he was invited and returned to play with USA Baseball. In 2023, Crews batted .426 with 18 homers, 70 RBI, and 100 runs scored and helped lead LSU to win the 2023 Men's College World Series. He was awarded SEC Player of the Year for the second consecutive season.

Crews was considered a top prospect for the 2023 Major League Baseball draft. The MLB Pipeline ranking on MLB.com listed Crews as the best draft prospect available and projected him to be selected first overall by the Pittsburgh Pirates. Baseball America, FanSided, and Perfect Game also projected Crews to be selected first overall. FanGraphs ranked him as the third-best prospect in the draft.

== Professional career ==
=== Minor leagues ===
Crews was selected second overall by the Washington Nationals in the 2023 Major League Baseball draft. On July 21, 2023, Crews signed with the Nationals for a $9 million signing bonus.

Crews made his professional debut after signing on August 3 with the rookie-level Florida Complex League where he went 3-for-3 with three runs in his lone game with the team. He was promoted to the Single-A Fredericksburg Nationals on August 5 with whom he posted a .355/.423/.645 slash line across 14 games. On August 20, he was promoted to the Double-A Harrisburg Senators and hit .208 with five doubles across 20 games. He finished the year with a combined slash line of .292/.377/.467 with five home runs and 24 RBI across 35 games with the three teams.

Crews began the 2024 campaign with Harrisburg, hitting .274/.343/.446 with five home runs, 38 RBI, and 15 stolen bases over 51 games. On June 17, 2024, he was promoted to the Triple–A Rochester Red Wings. Across 49 games with Rochester, Crews hit .265 with eight home runs and 30 RBI.

=== Major leagues ===
On August 26, 2024, Crews was selected to the 40-man roster and promoted to the major leagues for the first time. He made his MLB debut the same day at Nationals Park, going 0–for–3 with a walk versus the New York Yankees. He recorded his first MLB hit, a double off Yankees starter Gerrit Cole, on August 27. He hit his first MLB home run on August 28 off of Carlos Rodón of the Yankees. Crews played the remainder of the season with the Nationals, batting .218 with three home runs, eight RBI, and 12 stolen bases. At the end of the 2024 season, he was ranked as the #1 prospect in baseball according to MLB Pipeline.

Crews played in 45 games for Washington as the team's starting right fielder to begin the 2025 campaign, hitting .196 with seven home runs, 15 RBI, and 11 stolen bases. He was placed on the injured list with a left oblique strain on May 21. He was transferred to the 60-day injured list on July 22. He was activated again on August 14. Crews played a rehab assignment with Rochester before returning to the Nationals and was activated from the injured list on August 14. He ended the 2025 season playing in 85 games with Washington, slashing .208/.280/.352, with 10 home runs, 27 RBI, and 17 stolen bases.

The Nationals underwent significant changes to their front office, coaching staff, and player development system ahead of the 2026 season. After Crews struggled at the plate and in the field throughout spring training, the Nationals optioned him to Rochester to begin the season. He appeared in 41 games for Rochester and hit .258 with five home runs and 20 RBI before the Nationals recalled Crews to the majors on May 19. Crews played the remainder of the season with the Nationals and batted .223 with 13 home runs and 44 RBI across 109 games.

== Player profile ==
In his MLB.com draft profile, Crews has been described as "a plus hitter with plus power" with a "quick right-handed stroke" but was noted to have a tendency to whiff on changeups. The website also described Crews as an "at least average" outfielder with arm strength, an ability to track fly balls, and a potential to play center field at the major league level.

Crews has been described as a five-tool player. Former LSU head coach Paul Mainieri credited Crews with a preparedness for the college level that he compared to that of alumni DJ LeMahieu and Alex Bregman.
