= Tyler Guilfoil =

Baseball player (born 2000)

Lexington Legends
- Pitcher
- Born: January 19, 2000 (age 26); Lexington, Kentucky, U.S.
- Bats: Right Throws: Right

Tyler Hanley Guilfoil (born January 19, 2000) is an American professional baseball pitcher with the Lexington Legends.

Guilfoil grew up in Lexington, Kentucky, and attended Lafayette High School, where he won four straight district titles and was named in the Kentucky All-State team in 2018.

Guilfoil began his college baseball career at Lipscomb. He was named second-team All-ASUN Conference as a junior after going 3–1 with a 3.25 ERA and 53 strikeouts in 17 relief appearances. Guilfoil transferred to Kentucky after the season. In his only season with the Wildcats, he made 21 relief appearances and went 3–1 with six saves and a 1.59 ERA while striking out 80 batters. He was named an All-American.

Guilfoil was selected by the Houston Astros in the 8th round of the 2022 Major League Baseball draft. After signing with the team he was assigned to the Rookie-level Florida Complex League Astros and was later promoted to the Single-A Fayetteville Woodpeckers. Guilfoil made seven pitching appearances between the two teams and struck out 31 batters and had a 0.52 ERA over 17 1/3 innings pitched. The Astros released Guilfoil in March 2026.

Guilfoil signed with the Lexington Legends of the Atlantic League of Professional Baseball on April 24, 2026.
