= Rudy Abbott Field =

Baseball park in Jacksonville, Alabama

Rudy Abbott Field at Jim Case Stadium
- Interactive map of Rudy Abbott Field at Jim Case Stadium
- Location: 700 Pelham Road; Jacksonville, AL 36265
- Coordinates: 33.8250°N 85.7764°W
- Owner: Jacksonville State University
- Operator: Jacksonville State University
- Capacity: 2,020
- Executive suites: 4
- Surface: AstroTurf
- Record attendance: 2,033
- Field size: Left Field: 325 ft (99 m); Left-Center Field: 370 ft (110 m); Center Field: 400 ft (120 m); Right-Center Field: 365 ft (111 m); Right Field: 320 ft (98 m)

Construction
- Opened: 1995

Tenant
- Jacksonville State Gamecocks (NCAA) (1995–present)

Website
- Jim Case Stadium

Rudy Abbott Field at Jim Case Stadium is a baseball park in Jacksonville, Alabama. It has been home to the Jacksonville State University Gamecocks baseball team since 1995. The field has a capacity of 2,020 and is named for former baseball coach Rudy Abbott.

== See also ==
- List of NCAA Division I baseball venues
