= Ole Miss Rebels baseball statistical leaders =

The Ole Miss Rebels baseball statistical leaders are individual statistical leaders of the Ole Miss Rebels baseball program in various categories, including batting average, home runs, runs batted in, runs, hits, stolen bases, ERA, and Strikeouts. Within those areas, the lists identify single-game, single-season, and career leaders. The Rebels represent the University of Mississippi in the NCAA's Southeastern Conference.

Ole Miss began competing in intercollegiate baseball in 1893. These lists are updated through the end of the 2025 season.

== Batting Average ==
Career (Min. 200 ABs)
Rk	Player	AVG	Seasons
1	Donnie Kessinger	.400	1962 1963 1964
2	Jimmy Yawn	.390	1965 1966 1967
3	Jake Gibbs	.384	1959 1960 1961
4	Stuart Turner	.374	2013
5	Bubba Simon	.373	1986 1987
6	Brad Henderson	.371	1996 1997 1998 1999
7	Justin Henry	.359	2005 2006 2007
8	Larry Simcox	.356	1980 1981

Season (Min. 75 AB)
Rk	Player	AVG	Season
1	Donnie Kessinger	.436	1964
2	Jake Gibbs	.424	1960
3	Bernie Schreiber	.417	1956
4	David Dellucci	.410	1995
5	Jimmy Yawn	.408	1966
6	Chris Snopek	.407	1992
7	Donnie Kessinger	.402	1962
	Paul Husband	.402	1973
	Brad Henderson	.402	1997
	Seth Smith	.402	2002

== Home Runs ==
Career
Rk	Player	HR	Seasons
1	Judd Utermark	51	2023 2024 2025 2026
2	Kyle Gordon	48	1984 1985 1986 1987
3	Tim Elko	46	2018 2019 2020 2021 2022
4	Matt Smith	41	2008 2009 2010 2011
	Matt Snyder	41	2009 2010 2011 2012
6	Brad Henderson	40	1996 1997 1998 1999
	Jacob Gonzalez	40	2021 2022 2023
8	Kevin Graham	38	2019 2020 2021 2022
9	Burney Hutchinson	37	1999 2000 2001 2002
	Stephen Head	37	2003 2004 2005

Season
Rk	Player	HR	Season
1	Tim Elko	24	2022
2	Tristan Bissetta	23	2026
3	Judd Utermark	22	2025
	Judd Utermark	22	2026
5	Jason Huisman	21	1998
	Brian Pettway	21	2005
	Austin Fawley	21	2025
8	Andrew Fischer	20	2024
9	Kemp Alderman	19	2023
10	Michael Rosamond	18	1999
	Stephen Head	18	2005
	Jacob Gonzalez	18	2022

Single Game
Rk	Player	HR	Season	Opponent
1	Calvin Harris	4	2023	Missouri

== Runs Batted In ==
Career
Rk	Player	RBI	Seasons
1	Logan Power	183	2006 2007 2008 2009
	Matt Smith	183	2008 2009 2010 2011
3	Matt Snyder	173	2009 2010 2011 2012
4	Kyle Gordon	168	1984 1985 1986 1987
5	Burney Hutchinson	167	1999 2000 2001 2002
6	Stephen Head	165	2003 2004 2005
7	Brad Henderson	160	1996 1997 1998 1999
8	Tim Elko	159	2018 2019 2020 2021 2022
9	Jacob Gonzalez	158	2021 2022 2023
10	Zack Cozart	157	2005 2006 2007

Season
Rk	Player	RBI	Season
1	Mark Wright	79	2006
2	Tim Elko	75	2022
3	Jason Huisman	71	1998
4	Judd Utermark	69	2025
5	Stephen Head	68	2005
6	Brian Pettway	67	2005
7	Tyler Keenan	66	2019
	Will Allen	64	2014
	Zack Cozart	64	2006
10	David Dellucci	63	1995
	Burney Hutchinson	63	2001

Single Game
Rk	Player	RBI	Season	Opponent
1	Calvin Harris	10	2023	Missouri
	Charlie Conerly	10	1947	Millsaps

== Runs ==
Career
Rk	Player	R	Seasons
1	Brad Henderson	198	1996 1997 1998 1999
2	Burney Hutchinson	187	1999 2000 2001 2002
3	Jacob Gonzalez	186	2021 2022 2023
4	Matt Smith	185	2008 2009 2010 2011
5	David Dellucci	181	1992 1993 1994 1995
6	Logan Power	177	2006 2007 2008 2009
	Chris Coghlan	177	2004 2005 2006
8	Jordan Henry	174	2007 2008 2009
9	Kyle Gordon	167	1984 1985 1986 1987

Season
Rk	Player	R	Season
1	Chris Coghlan	75	2006
2	Jacob Gonzalez	73	2021
3	Judd Utermark	72	2026
4	Jordan Henry	70	2009
5	Burney Hutchinson	69	2001
6	Jacob Gonzalez	67	2022
	Grae Kessinger	67	2019
	Thomas Dillard	67	2018
	David Dellucci	67	1995
10	Chris Coghlan	66	2005
	Mitchell Sanford	66	2025
	Luke Hill	66	2025

Single Game
Rk	Player	R	Season	Opponent
1	Tim Elko	6	2022	Arizona
	Taylor Hashman	6	2010	UA-Pine Bluff

== Hits ==
Career
Rk	Player	H	Seasons
1	Brad Henderson	298	1996 1997 1998 1999
2	Logan Power	269	2006 2007 2008 2009
3	Matt Smith	268	2008 2009 2010 2011
4	Ryan Olenek	265	2016 2017 2018 2019
5	Kevin Kessinger	262	1989 1990 1991 1992
6	Will Golsan	261	2015 2016 2017 2018
7	Tanner Mathis	258	2010 2011 2012 2013
8	Zach Miller	253	2007 2008 2009 2010
	Chad Sterbens	253	2000 2001 2002 2003
10	Chris Coghlan	251	2004 2005 2006

Season
Rk	Player	H	Season
1	Brian Pettway	102	2005
2	Brad Henderson	101	1999
3	Jordan Henry	99	2007
	Justin Henry	99	2007
	Chris Coghlan	99	2005
6	Auston Bousfield	96	2014
7	Alex Yarbrough	95	2012
8	David Dellucci	94	1995
	Will Allen	94	2014
10	Jacob Gonzalez	93	2021

Single Game
Rk	Player	H	Season	Opponent
1	Tommy Nichols	6	1967	Delta State
	Bobby Wilson	6	1948	Delta State
	Charlie Conerly	6	1947	Millsaps

== Stolen Bases ==
Career
Rk	Player	SB	Seasons
1	John Shaw	73	1968 1969 1970
2	David Dellucci	72	1992 1993 1994 1995
3	Kevin Kessinger	66	1989 1990 1991 1992
4	Jordan Henry	64	2007 2008 2009
5	Jake Gibbs	53	1959 1960 1961
6	Charlie Williams	50	1965 1966
7	Kary Bridges	49	1991 1992 1993
8	Tim Ferguson	48	2008 2009 2010
9	Justin Henry	46	2005 2006 2007
10	Donnie Kessinger	44	1962 1963 1964

Season
Rk	Player	SB	Season
1	Jordan Henry	38	2009
2	David Dellucci	31	1995
	Charlie Williams	31	1966
4	Braxton Lee	30	2014
5	John Shaw	28	1970
	Kevin Kessinger	28	1991
7	David Dellucci	25	1994
8	Anthony Servideo	24	2019
	Tim Ferguson	24	2010
	Chris Coghlan	24	2006
	Kary Bridges	24	1993
	Anthony Felston	24	1996

Single Game
Rk	Player	SB	Season	Opponent
1	Mike Summerlin	5	1981	Alabama
	Lee Shumake	5	1952	Auburn

== Earned Run Average ==
Career (Min. 100 IP)
Rk	Player	ERA	Seasons
1	Larry Williams	1.71	1958 1959 1960
2	Scott Hasler	1.74	1965 1966 1967
3	Ken Kauerz	1.86	1968 1969 1970
4	Buddy Wittichen	1.87	1954 1955 1956 1957
5	Don Goad	1.99	1953 1954 1955 1956
6	Robert Earl Siedell	2.05	1961 1962 1963

Season (Min. 50 IP)
Rk	Player	ERA	Season
1	Don Goad	1.07	1954
2	Buddy Bowen	1.19	1970
3	Larry Williams	1.21	1959
4	Ken Kauerz	1.25	1970
5	Russ Johnson	1.26	1964

== Strikeouts ==
Career
Rk	Player	K	Seasons
1	Drew Pomeranz	344	2008 2009 2010
2	Lance Lynn	332	2006 2007 2008
3	Hunter Elliott	327	2022 2023 2025 2026
4	Jeff Calhoun	282	1977 1978 1979 1980
5	Mark Holliman	281	2003 2004 2005
6	Doug Nikhazy	259	2018 2019 2020 2021
7	Scott Bittle	257	2007 2008 2009
8	Brett Bukvich	245	2006 2007 2008 2009
9	Kenny Carlyle	244	1989 1990 1991 1992
10	Mickey Callaway	224	1994 1995 1996

Season
Rk	Player	K	Season
1	Lance Lynn	146	2007
2	Doug Nikhazy	142	2021
3	Drew Pomeranz	139	2010
4	Will Kline	134	2007
5	Scott Bittle	130	2008
6	Drew Pomeranz	124	2009
7	Ryan Rolison	120	2018
	Mark Holliman	120	2005
9	Jamey Price	118	1995
10	Matt Maloney	111	2005
	Hunter Elliott	111	2026

Single Game
Rk	Player	K	Season	Opponent
1	Robert Earl Siedell	16	1962	Delta State
	Jamey Price	16	1995	Kentucky
	Drew Pomeranz	16	2009	W. Kentucky
	Doug Nikhazy	16	2021	Florida State
