= Southern Miss Golden Eagles baseball statistical leaders =

The Southern Miss Golden Eagles baseball statistical leaders are individual statistical leaders of the Southern Miss Golden Eagles baseball program in various categories, including batting average, home runs, runs batted in, runs, hits, stolen bases, ERA, and Strikeouts. Within those areas, the lists identify single-game, single-season, and career leaders. The Golden Eagles represent the University of Southern Mississippi in the NCAA's Sun Belt Conference.

Southern Miss began competing in intercollegiate baseball in 1913. These lists are updated through the end of the 2025 season.

== Batting Average ==
Career (Min. 200 at Bats)
Rk	Player	AVG	Seasons
1	Wilson Plunkett	.399	1972 1973 1974
2	Luke Reynolds	.389	2018
3	Dalton McIntyre	.388	2024
4	Jeremy Schied	.380	1997 1998
5	Kevin Young	.379	1990
6	Clint King	.373	2002 2003
7	Todd Nace	.368	1989 1990 1991
8	Tommy Davis	.364	1992 1993 1994
9	Scott Cheek	.363	1998 1999
	Bill Selby	.363	1991 1992

Season (Min. 75 at Bats)
Rk	Player	AVG	Season
1	Wilson Plunkett	.453	1974
2	Tommy Davis	.409	1994
3	Michael Artman	.408	1999
4	Wilson Plunkett	.405	1973
	Jarrett Hoffpauir	.405	2004
6	Jeremy Schied	.402	1997
7	Clint King	.394	2003
8	Todd Nace	.392	1991
9	Brian Dozier	.391	2009
10	Luke Reynolds	.389	2018

== Home Runs ==
Career
Rk	Player	HR	Seasons
1	Matt Waller	58	2017 2018 2019
2	Marc Maddox	53	2003 2004 2005 2006
3	Christopher Sargent	51	2021 2022 2023
4	Jeff Cook	50	2000 2001 2002 2003
5	Carson Paetow	47	2022 2023 2024 2025
6	Slade Wilks	46	2021 2022 2023 2024
	Brad Willcutt	46	2002 2003 2004 2005
8	Fred Cooley	45	1987 1988 1989
9	Tommy Davis	43	1992 1993 1994
10	Dusty Haley	42	1997 1998 1999 2000 2001

Season
Rk	Player	HR	Season
1	Matt Waller	23	2019
	Jeff Cook	23	2003
	Clint King	23	2003
	Fred Cooley	23	1989
	Bill Selby	23	1992
6	Tommy Sims	22	1985
	Greg Conner	22	1986
	Ryan Frith	22	2004
9	Christopher Sargent	21	2022
	Nick Monistere	21	2025

Single Game
Rk	Player	HR	Season	Opponent
1	12 times	3	Most recent: Ben Higdon, 2025 vs. Georgia State	

== Runs Batted In ==
Career
Rk	Player	RBI	Seasons
1	Brad Willcutt	236	2002 2003 2004 2005
2	Marc Maddox	212	2003 2004 2005 2006
3	Tommy Davis	204	1992 1993 1994
4	Jeff Cook	201	2000 2001 2002 2003
5	Carson Paetow	194	2022 2023 2024 2025
6	Fred Cooley	191	1987 1988 1989
7	Matt Waller	190	2017 2018 2019
8	Hunter Slater	179	2016 2017 2018 2019
9	Kyle Logan	178	1994 1995 1996 1997
10	Jarrett Hoffpauir	177	2002 2003 2004

Season
Rk	Player	RBI	Season
1	Jarrett Hoffpauir	92	2004
2	Fred Cooley	86	1989
3	Brad Willcutt	82	2005
	Tommy Davis	82	1994
5	Jeremy Schied	81	1998
6	Clint King	77	2003
7	B.A. Vollmuth	76	2010
	Jeff Cook	76	2003
9	Kevin Young	75	1990
10	Greg Conner	73	1986

Single Game
Rk	Player	RBI	Season	Opponent
1	Danny Lynch	8	2023	Louisiana
	Slade Wilks	8	2023	James Madison
	Hunter Slater	8	2019	New Orleans
	Fred Cooley	8	1988	Belhaven
	Tommy Davis	8	1994	Tenn.-Martin

== Runs ==
Career
Rk	Player	R	Seasons
1	Marc Maddox	228	2003 2004 2005 2006
2	Trey Sutton	220	2005 2006 2007 2008
3	Gabe Montenegro	211	2018 2019 2020 2021 2022
4	Brad Willcutt	203	2002 2003 2004 2005
5	Jeff Cook	200	2000 2001 2002 2003
6	Scotty Jurich	188	1989 1990 1991
	Kameron Brunty	188	2009 2010 2011 2012
8	Brian Dozier	185	2006 2007 2008 2009
9	Hunter Slater	183	2016 2017 2018 2019
10	Dylan Burdeaux	181	2014 2015 2016 2017

Season
Rk	Player	R	Season
1	Tommy Davis	81	1994
2	Brady Mills	75	1998
3	Marc Maddox	74	2005
	Michael Artman	74	1999
	Matt Shepherd	74	2004
6	B.A. Vollmuth	72	2010
7	Scotty Jurich	71	1989
	Jeff Cook	71	2003
9	Joey Urban	70	2026
	Luke Reynolds	70	2018
	Shane Pullen	70	1994

Single Game
Rk	Player	R	Season	Opponent
1	Shane Pullen	6	1994	Tenn.-Martin

== Hits ==
Career
Rk	Player	H	Seasons
1	Trey Sutton	327	2005 2006 2007 2008
2	Gabe Montenegro	319	2018 2019 2020 2021 2022
3	Brian Dozier	307	2006 2007 2008 2009
4	Dylan Burdeaux	298	2014 2015 2016 2017
5	Marc Maddox	296	2003 2004 2005 2006
6	Jeff Cook	292	2000 2001 2002 2003
7	Brad Willcutt	290	2002 2003 2004 2005
8	Todd Nace	270	1989 1990 1991
9	Danny Lynch	269	2019 2020 2021 2022 2023
	Tommy Davis	269	1992 1993 1994

Season
Rk	Player	H	Season
1	Jarrett Hoffpauir	109	2004
2	Michael Artman	106	1999
3	Todd Nace	105	1991
4	Matt Shepherd	104	2004
5	Tommy Davis	103	1994
6	Dylan Burdeaux	102	2017
7	Clint King	100	2003
8	Kevin Young	96	1990
9	Jeff Cook	95	2003
10	Toddric Johnson	94	2006

Single Game
Rk	Player	H	Season	Opponent
1	Todd Nace	6	1991	Southeastern Louisiana
	Shane Pullen	6	1994	Tenn.-Martin
	Matt Shepherd	6	2004	TCU
	Travis Creel	6	2013	UAB

== Stolen Bases ==
Career
Rk	Player	SB	Seasons
1	Ive Burnett	85	1983 1984 1985 1986
2	Sylvester Love	75	1986 1987 1988
3	Scotty Jurich	66	1989 1990 1991
4	Mike Jacobs	50	1984 1985 1986
5	Chris Hesse	49	1996 1997
6	Kyle Logan	47	1994 1995 1996 1997
	Brent Covington	47	1989 1990 1991 1992
8	Dylan Burdeaux	44	2014 2015 2016 2017
9	Jared Martin	39	1994 1995 1996 1997
	Doug Benefiel	39	1989 1990 1991 1992

Season
Rk	Player	SB	Season
1	Scooter Love	42	1988
2	Ive Burnett	41	1984
3	Chris Hesse	32	1996
4	Mike Jacobs	29	1985
	Eric Estes	29	1992
6	Ive Burnett	27	1985
7	Scotty Jurich	26	1989
	Scotty Jurich	26	1991
	Brady Mills	26	1998
10	Matthew Etzel	23	2023

Single Game
Rk	Player	SB	Season	Opponent
1	Josh Hoffpauir	6	2000	Cincinnati

== Earned Run Average ==
Career (Min. 75 Innings)
Rk	Player	ERA	Seasons
1	Nick Sandlin	1.70	2016 2017 2018
2	Tony Phillips	1.98	1991
3	Rich Corsetto	2.08	1970 1971
4	Tyler Conn	2.27	2007 2008
5	Andrew Pierce	2.30	2012 2013
6	Bradley Roney	2.49	2012 2013 2014
7	Bobby Muhs	2.59	1970 1971 1972 1973
8	Hunter Stanley	2.60	2019 2020 2021
9	Walker Powell	2.83	2016 2018 2019 2020 2021
10	Kent Willis	2.89	1986
	Conor Fisk	2.89	2013 2014

Season (Min. 0.5 IP per team game)
Rk	Player	ERA	Season
1	Daniel Best	0.46	2005
2	Collin Cargill	0.93	2011
	Austin Tubb	0.93	2004
4	Rich Corsetto	0.97	1970
5	Nick Sandlin	1.06	2018
6	Bradley Roney	1.24	2014
	Walker Powell	1.24	2020
8	Ryan Och	1.27	2021
9	Steve Campbell	1.39	1968
10	Hunter Stanley	1.42	2020

== Strikeouts ==
Career
Rk	Player	K	Seasons
1	Darrell Lindsey	374	1985 1986 1987 1988
2	Todd McInnis	363	2007 2008 2009 2010 2011
3	Tanner Hall	302	2021 2022 2023
	Damon Pollard	302	1987 1988 1989 1990
5	Shea Douglas	285	2000 2001 2002
6	Barry Bowden	283	2005 2006 2007 2008
7	Walker Powell	275	2016 2018 2019 2020 2021
8	Nick Sandlin	268	2016 2017 2018
9	Frankie McLendon	267	1988 1989 1990 1991 1992
10	Ray Guy	266	1970 1971 1972

Season
Rk	Player	K	Season
1	Damon Pollard	152	1990
2	Damon Pollard	150	1989
3	Tanner Hall	146	2022
4	Nick Sandlin	144	2018
5	Hurston Waldrep	140	2022
	Kent Willis	140	1986
7	Gregg Kennedy	129	1993
8	Hunter Stanley	127	2021
9	Tanner Hall	124	2023
10	JB Middleton	122	2025

Single Game
Rk	Player	K	Season	Opponent
1	Fred Waters	19	1948	Loyola, N.O.
