= Chicago White Sox minor league players =

List of baseball players

Below is a partial list of minor league baseball players in the Chicago White Sox organizations and rosters of their affiliates:

== Players ==
=== William Bergolla Jr. ===
William Bergolla Jr.

Chicago White Sox
- Infielder
- Born: October 20, 2004 (age 22); Valencia, Venezuela
- Bats: Left Throws: Right

William Alejandro Bergolla Jr. (born October 20, 2004) is a Venezuelan professional baseball infielder for the Chicago White Sox of Major League Baseball (MLB).

Bergolla Jr. signed with the Philadelphia Phillies as an international free agent in January 2022. On July 30, 2024 the Phillies traded him to the Chicago White Sox in exchange for Tanner Banks.

The White Sox added Bergolla Jr. to their 40-man roster after the 2026 season.

- Career statistics from Baseball Reference (Minors)

=== Dylan Campbell ===
Dylan Campbell

Chicago White Sox
- Outfielder
- Born: July 2, 2002 (age 24); Houston, Texas, U.S.
- Bats: Right Throws: Right

Dylan Christopher Campbell (born July 2, 2002) is an American professional baseball outfielder in the Chicago White Sox organization.

Campbell attended Strake Jesuit College Preparatory in Houston, where he played baseball and football. He played college baseball at the University of Texas for the Texas Longhorns. In 2021 and 2022, he played collegiate summer baseball with the Santa Barbara Foresters of the California Collegiate League. As a junior at Texas in 2023, he hit .339 with 13 home runs, fifty RBI, and 26 stolen bases over 64 games. Campbell was selected by the Los Angeles Dodgers in the fourth round of the 2023 Major League Baseball draft. He signed with the team for $500,000.

Campbell made his professional debut after signing with the Arizona Complex League Dodgers and also played with the Rancho Cucamonga Quakes, hitting .213 with one home run over 14 games. In 2024, he played with the Great Lakes Loons and batted .251 with ten home runs, 53 RBI, and 42 stolen bases over 115 games.

On January 17, 2025, Campbell was traded to the Philadelphia Phillies in exchange for international pool money. He opened the 2025 season with the Jersey Shore BlueClaws. In June, he was promoted to the Reading Fightin Phils. Over 122 games between the two teams, Campbell hit .215 with 14 home runs, 60 RBI, and 33 stolen bases. After the season, he was assigned to play in the Arizona Fall League with the Surprise Saguaros. Campbell returned to Reading to open the 2026 season.

On June 11, 2026, the Phillies traded Campbell and Jose Colmenares to the Chicago White Sox in exchange for Derek Hill and $250,000 in international bonus pool money. The White Sox assigned him to the Birmingham Barons. Across 130 games played between Reading and Birmingham for the 2026 season, Campbell hit .237 with 16 home runs, 63 RBI, and 37 stolen bases.

- Texas Longhorns bio
- Career statistics from Baseball Reference (Minors)

=== Juan Carela ===
Juan Carela

Chicago White Sox
- Pitcher
- Born: December 15, 2001 (age 24); Samana, Dominican Republic
- Bats: Right Throws: Right

Juan Daniel Carela (born December 15, 2001) is a Dominican professional baseball pitcher in the Chicago White Sox organization.

Carela signed with the New York Yankees as an international free agent on July 2, 2018. He split 2019 between the Dominican Summer League Yankees and rookie-level Gulf Coast League Yankees, struggling to an 0–8 record and 7.59 ERA over 12 games. Carela did not play in a game in 2020 due to the cancellation of the minor league season because of the COVID-19 pandemic.

Carela returned to action in 2021 with the rookie-level Florida Complex League Yankees and Single-A Tampa Tarpons. In 12 games (11 starts) split between the two affiliates, he accumulated a 2–2 record and 6.38 ERA with 49 strikeouts across 42 1/3 innings of work. Carela split 2022 between Tampa and the High-A Hudson Valley Renegades, accumulating an 8–6 record and 4.21 ERA with 131 strikeouts in 107 innings pitched across 23 games (21 starts). Carela began the 2023 campaign with Hudson Valley, logging a 2–4 record and 3.67 ERA with 109 strikeouts across 17 appearances (16 starts).

On August 1, 2023, the Yankees traded Carela to the Chicago White Sox in exchange for Keynan Middleton. He made 6 starts for the High-A Winston-Salem Dash down the stretch, posting a 1–3 record and 3.34 ERA with 27 strikeouts across 32 1/3 innings pitched.

Carela split the 2024 campaign between Winston-Salem and the Double–A Birmingham Barons, compiling a 7–7 record and 3.71 ERA with 114 strikeouts across 106 2/3 innings pitched over 23 starts. On November 19, 2024, the White Sox added Carela to their 40-man roster to protect him from the Rule 5 draft.

On March 7, 2025, it was announced that Carela would miss the entirety of the 2025 season after undergoing Tommy John surgery. He was released by the White Sox on April 10. On April 19, Carela re-signed with the White Sox organization on a minor league contract.

In 2026, he made 16 starts between Double-A, High-A and rookie ball throwing 55 innings going 2-4 with a 4.75 ERA and 54 strikeouts.

- Career statistics from Baseball Reference (Minors)

=== Anthony DePino ===
Anthony DePino

Chicago White Sox
- First baseman
- Born: February 19, 2003 (age 23); New Haven, Connecticut, U.S.
- Bats: Right Throws: Right

Anthony Carl DePino (born February 19, 2003) is an American professional baseball first baseman in the Chicago White Sox organization.

DePino attended Daniel Hand High School in Madison, Connecticut. As a senior in 2021, he hit .400 with five home runs. He played four years of college baseball at the University of Rhode Island. In 2025, his senior year at Rhode Island, he batted .354 with 20 home runs and 61 RBI.

Following the 2025 collegiate baseball season, DePino was selected by the Chicago White Sox in the seventh round of the 2025 Major League Baseball draft. He made his professional debut after signing with the Single-A Kannapolis Cannon Ballers and hit .223 with two home runs over 29 games. DePino was assigned to the High-A Winston-Salem Dash to start the 2026 season and was promoted to the Double-A Birmingham Barons in May. Across 125 games between both teams, he batted .262 with 25 home runs and 82 RBI. After the season, DePino was assigned to play in the Arizona Fall League with the Glendale Desert Dogs.

- Career statistics from Baseball Reference (Minors)
- Rhode Island Rams bio

=== Jaden Fauske ===
Jaden Fauske

Chicago White Sox
- Outfielder
- Born: November 21, 2006 (age 19); Willowbrook, Illinois, U.S.
- Bats: Left Throws: Right

Jaden Fauske (born November 21, 2006) is an American professional baseball outfielder in the Chicago White Sox organization.

Fauske attended Nazareth Academy in La Grange Park, Illinois, where he played baseball as an outfielder and catcher. As a senior, he was the Illinois Gatorade Baseball Player of the Year after hitting .475 with six home runs and 40 runs batted in (RBI). He was selected by the Chicago White Sox in the second round of the 2025 Major League Baseball draft.

Fauske made his professional debut in 2026 with the Kannapolis Cannon Ballers.

- Career statistics from Baseball Reference (Minors)

=== Riley Gowens ===
Riley Gowens

Chicago White Sox
- Pitcher
- Born: October 18, 1999 (age 27); Libertyville, Illinois, U.S.
- Bats: Right Throws: Right

Riley Patrick Gowens (born October 18, 1999) is an American professional baseball pitcher in the Chicago White Sox organization.

Gowens attended Libertyville High School in Libertyville, Illinois, and the University of Illinois at Urbana-Champaign. He played college baseball for the Illinois Fighting Illini. The Atlanta Braves selected him in the ninth round of the 2023 MLB draft.

On November 16, 2023, the Braves traded Gowens, Michael Soroka, Jared Shuster, Nicky Lopez, and Braden Shewmake to the Chicago White Sox for Aaron Bummer.

- Career statistics from Baseball Reference (Minors)

=== Wes Kath ===
Wes Kath

Chicago White Sox
- Third baseman
- Born: August 3, 2002 (age 24); Scottsdale, Arizona, U.S.
- Bats: Left Throws: Right

Weston Douglas Kath (born August 3, 2002) is an American professional baseball third baseman in the Chicago White Sox organization.

Kath attended Desert Mountain High School in Scottsdale, Arizona. He committed to play college baseball at Arizona State University. He played in both the Area Code Games and the World Wood Bat Association World Championship in 2020. In 2021, as a senior, he helped lead Desert Mountain to a 5A State Championship title. He was subsequently named the Arizona Gatorade High School Baseball Player of the Year after batting .486 with 11 home runs, 29 RBIs, and 34 runs scored.

Kath was selected by the Chicago White Sox in the second round with the 57th overall selection of the 2021 Major League Baseball draft. He signed for $1.8 million. He made his professional debut with the Rookie-level Arizona Complex League White Sox. Over 104 at-bats in 28 games, he slashed .212/.287/.337 with three home runs and 15 RBIs. He was assigned to the Kannapolis Cannon Ballers of the Single-A Carolina League to begin the 2022 season. In mid-August, he was promoted to the Birmingham Barons of the Double-A Southern League. Over 112 games between the two teams, Kath batted .230 with 13 home runs, 45 RBIs, and 21 doubles. For the 2023 season, he was assigned to the Winston-Salem Dash of the High-A South Atlantic League. Over 95 games, he hit .193 with eight home runs and 31 RBIs. Kath returned to Winston-Salem for the 2024 season, batting .226 with 16 home runs and 58 RBIs over 116 games. In 2025, Kath played 51 games with the ACL White Sox and Winston-Salem, hitting .171 with one home run and 15 RBIs. He returned to play 23 games in 2026 with the ACL White Sox and Winston-Salem and batted .244 with two home runs and 12 RBIs.

- Career statistics from Baseball Reference (Minors)

=== Mathias LaCombe ===
Mathias LaCombe

Chicago White Sox
- Pitcher
- Born: June 12, 2002 (age 24); Libourne, France
- Bats: Right Throws: Right

Mathias LaCombe (born June 12, 2002) is a French professional baseball pitcher for the Chicago White Sox of Major League Baseball (MLB).

LaCombe grew up near Bordeaux, France, where baseball is not popular. He first started playing rugby, but disliked it and moved to baseball at 8 years old.

LaCombe attended Cochise College from 2022 to 2023. In 2023, he went 5–3 with a 1.74 ERA over 67.2 innings. LaCombe was drafted by the White Sox in the 2023 Major League Baseball draft with the 359th pick in the 12th round. He was the first French pitcher to be drafted in MLB history, and the second French player after Joris Bert.

LaCombe was assigned to the Arizona Complex League to begin his White Sox career in 2025, and was later promoted to the A-level Kannapolis Cannon Ballers. In 2025, LaCombe played in 19 games, 14 of them starts. He had a 0–1 record and a 3.34 ERA in 53.1 innings. He was promoted to the A+-level Winston-Salem Dash in 2026, and moved primarily to a reliever role.

- Career statistics from Baseball Reference (Minors)

=== Christian Oppor ===
Christian Oppor

Chicago White Sox
- Pitcher
- Born: July 23, 2004 (age 22); Madison, Wisconsin, U.S.
- Bats: Left Throws: Left

Christian Elliott Oppor (born July 23, 2004) is an American professional baseball pitcher in the Chicago White Sox organization.

Oppor attended Columbus High School in Marshfield, Wisconsin. He was selected by the Oakland Athletics in the 11th round of the 2022 Major League Baseball draft, but did not sign and played college baseball at Gulf Coast State College. After one year at Gulf Coast State, he was selected by the Chicago White Sox in the fifth round of the 2023 MLB draft and signed.

Oppor made his professional debut in 2023 with the Arizona Complex League White Sox and also pitched 2024 with them. He started 2025 with the Kannapolis Cannon Ballers before being promoted to the Winston-Salem Dash.

- Career statistics from Baseball Reference (Minors)

=== Jeral Pérez ===
Jeral Pérez

Chicago White Sox
- Infielder
- Born: November 6, 2004 (age 22); La Romana, Dominican Republic
- Bats: Right Throws: Right

Jeral Pérez (born November 6, 2004) is a Dominican professional baseball infielder in the Chicago White Sox organization.

On January 15, 2022, Pérez signed with the Los Angeles Dodgers organization as an international free agent. He made his professional debut with the Dominican Summer League Dodgers, hitting .278/.371/.500 with eight home runs and 28 RBI across 48 games.

Pérez spent the majority of the 2023 campaign with the rookie–level Arizona Complex League Dodgers, also appearing in seven games for the Single–A Rancho Cucamonga Quakes. In 53 games for the ACL Dodgers, he slashed .257/.389/.503 with a league–leading 11 home runs, 41 RBI, and nine stolen bases.

During the 2023-24 offseason, Pérez made minor mechanical changes in his batting stance, which included standing closer to the plate. Returning to Rancho Cucamonga, he hit eight home runs and posted an .825 OPS in his first 244 at–bats, a performance which earned him an invitation to the 2024 All-Star Futures Game.

On July 29, 2024, the Dodgers traded Pérez to the Chicago White Sox as part of a three-team deal that also sent Alexander Albertus and Miguel Vargas to Chicago, sent Tommy Edman, Michael Kopech, and Oliver Gonzalez to the Los Angeles Dodgers, and sent Erick Fedde and Tommy Pham to the St. Louis Cardinals.

- Career statistics from Baseball Reference (Minors)

=== Colby Shelton ===
Colby Shelton

Chicago White Sox
- Shortstop
- Born: December 6, 2002 (age 23); Charlotte, North Carolina, U.S.
- Bats: Left Throws: Right

Colby James Shelton (born December 6, 2002) is an American professional baseball shortstop in the Chicago White Sox organization.

Shelton attended Bloomingdale High School in Valrico, Florida. Following his graduation in 2022, he enrolled at the University of Alabama to play college baseball for the Crimson Tide. As a freshman for the Crimson Tide in 2023, Shelton played in 59 games and hit .300 with 25 home runs and 51 RBI. Following the firing of Alabama head coach Brad Bohannon for gambling activity, Shelton entered the transfer portal and committed to play for the University of Florida and the Gators. As a sophomore for the Gators in 2024, Shelton batted .254 with 20 home runs and 56 RBI across 66 games. In 2023, he played collegiate summer baseball with the Falmouth Commodores of the Cape Cod Baseball League, and returned to the league in 2024 with the Brewster Whitecaps. He was selected by the Washington Nationals in the 20th round of the 2024 Major League Baseball draft but did not sign. As a junior in 2025, Shelton played in 45 games and batted .377 with seven home runs and 35 RBI, missing the later half of the season with a hand injury. He was selected by the Chicago White Sox in the sixth round of the 2025 Major League Baseball draft and signed.

Shelton made his professional debut with the Kannapolis Cannon Ballers with whom he hit .141 with one home run across 27 games. He was assigned to the Winston-Salem Dash to open the 2026 season and was awarded Minor League Player of the Month by Major League Baseball for the month of April. Shelton was promoted to the Birmingham Barons in May. Across 127 games played between the two teams, he batted .244 with 24 home runs, 82 RBI, and 34 doubles. After the season, he was assigned to play in the Arizona Fall League with the Glendale Desert Dogs.

- Career statistics from Baseball Reference (Minors)
- Florida Gators bio

=== Jordan Sprinkle ===
Jordan Sprinkle

Chicago White Sox
- Shortstop
- Born: March 6, 2001 (age 25); Indio, California, U.S.
- Bats: Right Throws: Right

Jordan Tyler Sprinkle (born March 6, 2001) is an American professional baseball shortstop in the Chicago White Sox organization.

Sprinkle grew up in Palm Springs, California and attended Palm Desert High School.

Sprinkle played college baseball for the UC Santa Barbara Gauchos for three seasons. He played in three games and went hitless in two at-bats during his true freshman season before it was cut short due to the coronavirus pandemic. Sprinkle was named the Big West Conference Co-Freshmen Field Player of the Year as a redshirt freshman after batting .353 with 18 doubles, seven home runs, and 32 RBIs and led the conference with 26 stolen bases. He was named second team All-Big West after hitting .285 with 32 RBIs, 44 runs scored, and 25 stolen bases. Following the end of the season he entered the NCAA transfer portal and committed to play at Arkansas. In 2021, he played collegiate summer baseball with the Orleans Firebirds of the Cape Cod Baseball League.

Sprinkle was selected in the fourth round of the 2022 MLB draft by the Chicago White Sox. He signed with the team on July 27, 2022, and received a $452,900 signing bonus.

- Career statistics from MLB · Baseball Reference (Minors)
- UC Santa Barbara Gauchos bio

=== George Wolkow ===
George Wolkow

Chicago White Sox
- Outfielder
- Born: January 11, 2006 (age 20); Downers Grove, Illinois, U.S.
- Bats: Left Throws: Right

George Anthony Wolkow (born January 11, 2006) is an American professional baseball outfielder in the Chicago White Sox organization.

Wolkow attended Downers Grove North High School in Downers Grove, Illinois. He participated in the 2023 MLB Draft Combine. He committed to play college baseball at the University of South Carolina. Wolkow was selected by the Chicago White Sox in the seventh round of the 2023 Major League Baseball draft.

Wolkow signed with the White Sox and made his professional debut with the Arizona Complex League White Sox, hitting .225 over 13 games. Wolkow started 2024 with the ACL White Sox before being promoted to the Kannapolis Cannon Ballers. Over 91 games between both teams, he batted .257 with 13 home runs and 56 RBIs. Wolkow was assigned to Kannapolis to open the 2025 season.

- Career statistics from Baseball Reference (Minors)

=== Jaden Woods ===
Jaden Woods

Chicago White Sox
- Pitcher
- Born: February 1, 2002 (age 24); Macon, Georgia, U.S.
- Bats: Left Throws: Left

Jaden Chance Woods (born February 1, 2002) is an American professional baseball pitcher for the Chicago White Sox of Major League Baseball (MLB).

Woods attended Houston County High School in Warner Robins, Georgia. He began playing baseball when he was a freshman in high school after the school did not offer his preferred sport, lacrosse. He played college baseball at the University of Georgia for the Georgia Bulldogs. In 2022, he played collegiate summer baseball with the Harwich Mariners of the Cape Cod Baseball League. As a junior in 2023, he started ten games and went 3–3 with a 5.77 ERA. After the season, Woods was selected by the Pittsburgh Pirates in the seventh round of the 2023 Major League Baseball draft.

Woods signed with the Pirates and made his professional debut with the Bradenton Marauders, pitching to a 3.14 ERA over 14 1/3 innings. To open the 2024 season, Woods was assigned to the Greensboro Grasshoppers before he was promoted to the Altoona Curve in June. Over 39 relief appearances between the two teams, he posted a 4–3 record, a 3.75 ERA, and 74 strikeouts over sixty innings. He was assigned to Altoona for the 2025 season. Woods made 44 relief appearances for the Curve and went 5–5 with a 5.81 ERA and 68 strikeouts over 62 innings. He was assigned to play in the Arizona Fall League with the Salt River Rafters after the season. Woods returned to Altoona to open the 2026 season. He made 17 relief appearances for the team and had a 3.16 ERA with 38 strikeouts across 25 2/3 innings, and was promoted to the Indianapolis Indians in June. With Indianapolis, Woods made 11 appearances and had a 7.71 ERA.

On July 10, 2026, the Pirates traded Woods, alongside the 34th overall pick in the 2026 Major League Baseball draft, to the Chicago White Sox in exchange for Jacob Gonzalez and Brandon Eisert. He was assigned to the Charlotte Knights and made 18 relief appearances in which he had a 4–1 record, a 2.96 ERA, and 35 strikeouts over 24 1/3 innings. After the season, the White Sox added Woods to their 40-man roster to protect him from the Rule 5 draft.

- Career statistics from Baseball Reference (Minors)
- Georgia Bulldogs bio

=== Samuel Zavala ===
Samuel Zavala

Chicago White Sox
- Outfielder
- Born: July 15, 2004 (age 22); Caracas, Venezuela
- Bats: Left Throws: Left

Samuel Elias Zavala (born July 15, 2004) is a Venezuelan professional baseball outfielder in the Chicago White Sox organization.

Zavala signed with the San Diego Padres as an international free agent in January 2021. He made his professional debut that year with the Dominican Summer League Padres.

Zavala played 2022 with the Arizona Complex League Padres and Lake Elsinore Storm. He started 2023 with Lake Elsinore.

On March 13, 2024, the Padres traded Zavala, Steven Wilson, Drew Thorpe, and Jairo Iriarte to the Chicago White Sox in exchange for Dylan Cease.

- Career statistics from Baseball Reference (Minors)

== Full Triple-A to Rookie League rosters ==
=== Triple-A ===
Charlotte Knights roster
Players		Coaches/Other
Pitchers: 46 Nick Altermatt; 45 Pierce George; 19 Mathias LaCombe; 3 Jordan Morales; 44 Chris Murphy *; 47 Shane Murphy; 18 Peyton Pallette *; 49 Chase Plymell; 17 Joe Rock *; 28 Garrett Schoenle	Catchers: 9 Kaleb Freeman; 12 Michael Turner; Infielders: 5 Mario Camilletti; 45 Tim Elko; 16 Ryan Galanie; 25 Jacob Gonzalez *; 9 Jason Matthews; Outfielders: 4 Dru Baker; 8 Caden Connor	Manager: 29 Chad Pinder; Coaches: 55 Scott Aldred (pitching); 84 Aaron Bray (hitting); 32 Pat Listach (bench); 21 Angel Rosario (catching); -- George Timke (performance); 7-day injured list; * On Chicago White Sox 40-man roster; ~ Development list; # Rehab assignment; ∞ Reserve list; ‡ Restricted list; § Suspended list; † Temporarily inactive list; Roster updated November 17, 2026; Transactions; → More rosters: MiLB • International League; → Chicago White Sox minor league players

=== Double-A ===
Birmingham Barons roster
Players		Coaches/Other
Pitchers: 31 Morris Austin; 14 Juan Carela; 39 Jonathan Clark; 5 Phil Fox; 13 Lucas Gordon; 12 Riley Gowens; 33 Carson Jacobs; 38 Seth Keener; 17 Jackson Kelley; 15 Connor McCullough; 38 Liam Paddack; 30 Jake Palisch *; -- Tommy Vail; 36 Garrett Wright	Catchers: 21 Jorge Corona; 20 Calvin Harris; 10 Grant Magill; Infielders: 7 Caleb Bonemer; 4 Ryan Burrowes; 9 Jose Colmenares; 29 Anthony DePino; 26 Alec Makarewicz; 1 Colby Shelton; 18 Jordan Sprinkle; Outfielders: 23 Jacob Burke; 27 Dylan Campbell	Manager: 11 Pat Leyland; Coaches: 24 Aaron Hill (hitting); 16 John Kovalik (pitching); -- Juan Maldonado (performance); 3 Daniel Millwee (bench); 7-day injured list; * On Chicago White Sox 40-man roster; ~ Development list; # Rehab assignment; ∞ Reserve list; ‡ Restricted list; § Suspended list; † Temporarily inactive list; Roster updated November 2, 2026; Transactions; → More rosters: MiLB • Southern League; → Chicago White Sox minor league players

=== High-A ===
Winston-Salem Dash roster
Players		Coaches/Other
Pitchers: 29 Frankeli Arias; 36 Max Banks; -- Aldrin Batista; 33 Dylan Carmouche; 14 Drew Conover; 10 Trey Cooper; 6 Jake Curtis; 17 Riley Eikhoff; -- Clete Hartzog; 31 Aric McAtee; 32 Drew McDaniel; 22 Jesus Mendez; 21 Mason Moore; 12 Christian Oppor; 29 Caedmon Parker; 26 Landen Payne; 45 Carlton Perkins; 25 Jarold Rosado; 27 Justin Sinibaldi; 44 Grant Umberger; 31 Blaine Wynk; 16 Jack Young	Catchers: 46 Jackson Appel; 22 Rylan Galvan; 15 Ben Hartl; Infielders: 43 Jake Berkland; 1 Roch Cholowsky; 4 Bryce Eblin; 20 Wes Kath; 2 Kyle Lodise; 7 Javier Mogollon; 30 Jeral Pérez; Outfielders: 3 Ely Brown; 23 Derek Cerda; 35 Braden Holcomb; 13 Nick McLain; 17 James Taussig; 19 George Wolkow	Manager: 24 Guillermo Quiroz; Coaches: 8 Tyler Coolbaugh (bench); 41 Jacob Dorris (pitching); -- Logan Jones (performance); 5 Adam Sinkoe (hitting); 7-day injured list; * On Chicago White Sox 40-man roster; ~ Development list; # Rehab assignment; ∞ Reserve list; ‡ Restricted list; § Suspended list; † Temporarily inactive list; Roster updated November 2, 2026; Transactions; → More rosters: MiLB • South Atlantic League; → Chicago White Sox minor league players

=== Single-A ===
Kannapolis Cannon Ballers roster
Players		Coaches/Other
Pitchers: 32 Marco Barrios; 14 Andrew Berg; 38 Grant Cleavinger; 26 Luis Fonseca; 39 Kendry Garcia; 33 Alexander Martinez; 25 Fidel Montero; 15 Truman Pauley; 20 Nick Pinto; -- Luis Reyes; 17 Gabriel Rodriguez; 11 Ryan Schiefer; 37 Gabe Tanner; 22 Nick Weyrich; 35 Daniel Wright; 18 Fabian Ysalla	Catchers: 24 Stiven Flores; 6 Landon Hodge; 29 Steven Lancia; 7 Erasmi Rodriguez; Infielders: 16 Alexander Albertus; 12 Matthew Boughton; 9 Billy Carlson; 23 Grayson Fitzwater; 5 Efran Teran; Outfielders: 7 Clay Burdette; 21 Jaden Fauske; 27 Christian Gonzalez; 4 Crew McChesney; 8 Abraham Nunez; -- Casey Saucke	Manager: 17 Jayson Nix; Coaches: 28 Xavier Fernández (bench); 13 Rob Hardy (pitching); 19 Charlie Romero (hitting); 7-day injured list; * On Chicago White Sox 40-man roster; ~ Development list; # Rehab assignment; ∞ Reserve list; ‡ Restricted list; § Suspended list; † Temporarily inactive list; Roster updated November 11, 2026; Transactions; → More rosters: MiLB • Carolina League; → Chicago White Sox minor league players

=== Rookie ===
Arizona Complex League White Sox roster
Players		Coaches/Other
Pitchers: 58 Angel Bello; -- Jackson Bergman; -- Kyle Casteel; 32 Jordany Chirinos; -- Luke Craytor; 37 Reudis Diaz; -- Choyce Diffey; -- Justin Feld; 72 Justin Fuson; 36 Reinder Gomez; -- Darin Horn; -- Cameron Johnson; 28 Blake Larson; -- Nathan Leininger; 29 Denny Lima; 46 Cesar Nunez; 64 Diego Perez; -- Yobal Rodriguez; -- Cal Scolari; -- Eric Segura; -- Andrew Sentlinger; -- Michael Sharman; 57 Blake Shephardson; 52 Orlando Suarez; 48 Marcelo Valladares; -- Joey Volchko; -- Isaac Yeager	Catchers: -- Colin Barczi; 44 Jose M. Mendoza; Infielders: 1 Alejandro Cruz; 15 Eduardo Herrera; -- Jayson Jones; -- Luke Lawrence; -- Cole Prosek; 25 Jefrank Silva; 60 Yordani Soto; -- Landon Thome; Outfielders: 22 Marcelo Alcala; -- Matthew Bucciero; 7 Osniel Castillo; 61 Alan Escobar; 18 Frank Mieses; 6 Jordan Rich; -- Alex Weingartner	Manager: 26 Danny Gonzalez; Coaches: 21 Anders Dzurak (pitching); 73 Mike Gellinger (bench); 54 Miguel Gonzalez (performance); 13 Gerardo Olivares (hitting); 7-day injured list; * On Chicago White Sox 40-man roster; ~ Development list; # Rehab assignment; ∞ Reserve list; ‡ Restricted list; § Suspended list; † Temporarily inactive list; Roster updated November 2, 2026; Transactions; → More rosters: MiLB • Arizona Complex League; → Chicago White Sox minor league players

=== Foreign Rookie ===
Dominican Summer League White Sox roster
Players		Coaches/Other
Pitchers: 21 Beinol Adon; 32 David Colmenares; 17 Franchel Crisostomo; 36 Jhoriel De La Rosa; 39 Alexander De Los Santos; 43 Oriel Fortuna; 25 Ander Guzman; 44 Ronald Kelly; 29 Erlyn Lauriano; 47 Yordany Marte; -- Keiner Martinez; 50 Hansel Pinales; 17 Roderic Ramirez; 31 Enmanuel Rodriguez; 39 Christopher Romero; 38 Erick Rosso; 57 Mario Sosa; 53 Jose Taveras; 24 Jefferson Timaure	Catchers: 34 Ronald Cardozo; 10 Fernando Graterol; 8 Diego Natera; 20 Jose Suarez; 60 Josiel Veras; Infielders: 23 Felix Lebron; 5 Samuel Luis; 6 Dionys Medina; 27 Hector Paulino; 18 Nestor Perez; Outfielders: 1 Hector Hernandez; 13 Orlando Patino; 7 Sebastian Romero; 36 Stiwarts Valdez	Manager: -- Wellington Morrobel; -- Anthony Nunez; Coaches: -- Fran Bautista (performance); -- Carlos Chavez (pitching); -- Carlos Javier (performance); -- Moises Nunez (hitting); -- Stolmy Pimentel (assistant pitching); -- Guillermo Reyes (infield); -- J.C. Sapper (pitching); -- Rigoberto Silverio (development); 7-day injured list; * On Chicago White Sox 40-man roster; ~ Development list; # Rehab assignment; ∞ Reserve list; ‡ Restricted list; § Suspended list; † Temporarily inactive list; Roster updated October 20, 2026; Transactions; → More rosters: MiLB • Dominican Summer League; → Chicago White Sox minor league players
