= Brandon Eisert =

American baseball player (born 1998)

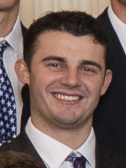
- Eisert at the White House in 2019

Pittsburgh Pirates – No. 14
- Pitcher
- Born: January 19, 1998 (age 28); Portland, Oregon, U.S.
- Bats: Left Throws: Left

MLB debut
- June 17, 2024, for the Toronto Blue Jays

MLB statistics (through 2026 season)
- Win–loss record: 6–11
- Earned run average: 4.79
- Strikeouts: 125
- Stats at Baseball Reference

Teams
- Toronto Blue Jays (2024); Chicago White Sox (2025–2026); Pittsburgh Pirates (2026–present)

Brandon Michael Eisert (born January 19, 1998) is an American professional baseball pitcher for the Pittsburgh Pirates of Major League Baseball (MLB). He has previously played in MLB for the Toronto Blue Jays and Chicago White Sox. He made his MLB debut in 2024.

== Career ==
=== Early life ===
Eisert graduated from Aloha High School outside of Portland, Oregon. He played summer Collegiate wood bat baseball with the Cowlitz Black Bears of the West Coast League. Played at Oregon State from 2017–2019 and was a key member of Oregon State's 2018 National Championship baseball team.

=== Toronto Blue Jays ===
Eisert was drafted by the Toronto Blue Jays in the 18th round, with the 537th overall pick, of the 2019 Major League Baseball draft. He did not play in a game in 2020 due to the cancellation of the minor league season because of the COVID-19 pandemic.

Eisert made his professional debut in 2021, splitting the year between the Single–A Dunedin Blue Jays, High–A Vancouver Canadians, and Double–A New Hampshire Fisher Cats. In 32 relief outings split between the three affiliates, he accumulated a 6–1 record and 3.55 ERA with 82 strikeouts across 63 1/3 innings pitched.

Eisert spent the 2022 campaign with the Triple–A Buffalo Bisons, making 45 appearances and recording a 3.41 ERA with 77 strikeouts across 60 2/3 innings of work. He returned to Buffalo in 2023, posting a 4–3 record and 4.17 ERA with 76 strikeouts and 2 saves in 59 games. Eisert began the 2024 season with Buffalo, and struggled to a 6.35 ERA across 19 contests.

On June 17, 2024, Eisert was selected to the 40-man roster and promoted to the major leagues for the first time. In 3 games during his rookie campaign, he posted a 4.05 ERA with 2 strikeouts across 6 2/3 innings pitched.

Eisert was designated for assignment following the signing of Anthony Santander on January 20, 2025.

=== Chicago White Sox ===
On January 23, 2025, Eisert was traded to the Tampa Bay Rays in exchange for cash considerations. He was designated for assignment by the Rays on February 3. Eisert was claimed by the Chicago White Sox on February 7. On April 20, Eisert recorded his first career win after tossing 1 2/3 innings against the Boston Red Sox. He made 72 appearances for Chicago, compiling a 3–8 record and 4.39 ERA with 74 strikeouts and two saves across 69 2/3 innings pitched.

Eisert was optioned to the Triple-A Charlotte Knights to begin the 2026 season. He appeared in 25 games (starting four) for the White Sox, logging a 2–1 record and 5.93 ERA with 32 strikeouts.

=== Pittsburgh Pirates ===
On July 10, 2026, the White Sox traded Eisert, alongside Jacob Gonzalez, to the Pittsburgh Pirates in exchange for the 34th overall pick in the 2026 Major League Baseball draft and Jaden Woods.
