= Ace Reese =

American baseball player (born 2005)

Seattle Mariners
- Third baseman
- Born: April 13, 2005 (age 21); Canton, Texas, U.S.
- Bats: Left Throws: Right
- Stats at Baseball Reference

Ace Douglas Reese (born April 13, 2005) is an American baseball third baseman in the Seattle Mariners organization.

== Early life ==
Reese's parents, Aaron and Christina Reese, chose his name because his father believed Reese would become a star baseball pitcher. His father's career as an electrical contractor forced the family to move between Dallas and Houston, Texas, before settling in Canton when Reese was in seventh grade, where he attended Canton High School. He modeled his swing based on Ken Griffey Jr. and named him as a big influence.

He was named to the Texas Sports Writers Association (TSWA) Class 4A All-State Baseball First Team in both 2021 and 2022, first as an outfielder and subsequently while playing shortstop. He was also deemed Offensive Player of the Year of the All-East Texas Baseball Team by the Tyler Morning Telegraph, having hit .524 with 43 runs off 43 hits—including 2 home runs and 35 walks, as well as earning 43 RBIs, 14 stolen bases, and striking out 6 times in 120 plate appearances. That year, Reese also earned six extra-base hits and batted .624 in the postseason.

He was named to the TSWA Class 4A All-State Baseball Second Team as a senior in 2023, and named the Tyler Morning Telegraph's 2022–23 All-Rose Country Baseball Team's Offensive Player of the Year, hitting .477 with 38 runs off 42 hits and 28 walks while recording 40 RBIs, 3 home runs, and 25 stolen bases. After leading Canton to their league championship, Reese was announced as the Most Valuable Player (MVP) on the All-District 14-4A baseball team, having signed with the University of Houston to play for the Houston Cougars.

== Amateur career ==
=== Houston Cougars (2023–24) ===
During his freshman year at the University of Houston Reese attended the Houston Cougars' fall baseball practice, hitting a home run in a scrimmage against Texas A&M. Despite Reese's experience as a shortstop, it was suggested by coach Todd Whitting that he would be used as a utility player throughout the 2024 season. Slashing .375/.484/.667 for the season, Reese started in left field for the Cougars' final game of the 2024 Astros Foundation College Classic on March 3 against UL Lafayette. In a game which went 11 innings and took almost 4 1/2 hours to complete, Reese recorded two runs from a triple and a walk with three strikeouts before Houston defeated Louisiana 13–10.

Three days later, he was brought in to pinch hit against the Sam Houston Bearkats at bottom of the ninth inning in the opening game of the Don Sander's Cup. Reese delivered a 2-RBI double to walk-off Sam Houston and secure UH a 2–1 victory, and the Cougars went on to win the Cup later that May.

At the end of the season, Reese was named to the 2024 All-Big 12 Freshman Team, having batted .278 for the season with seven home runs, 34 RBIs, and four triples, as well as recording the third-most home runs by a Big 12 freshman, fifth-most RBI, and second-most triples in the league. He was also one of three Cougars with an 11-game hitting streak, and recorded hits in 12 of his first 13 games.

Over the summer, Reese played for the Orange County Riptide of the California Collegiate League (CCL) and was chosen to represent the Riptides' South Division in the 2024 CCL Showcase after slashing .369/.446/.524. Reese was named to the 2024 CCL All-South Division and All-League Teams at the end of the collegiate summer baseball season.

On July 2, 2024, it was announced that Reese had entered the transfer portal and committed to Mississippi State University (MSU) and the Mississippi State Bulldogs.

=== Mississippi State Bulldogs (2024–2026) ===
Reese participated in the 2025 Astros Foundation College Classic, his second tournament appearance and first as a member of the Mississippi State Bulldogs, after which he was named the 2025 All-Tournament Team's third baseman.

In the Bulldogs' final series of the 2025 regular season, facing the Missouri Tigers, Reese went 8-for-12 with four home runs, six RBIs, 11 runs and five walks. By the end of the season, Reese ranked third in the Southeastern Conference (SEC) with his .718 slugging percentage, tied fourth with 21 home runs, fifth in on-base plus slugging percentage at 1.140, tied fifth in both doubles (18) and sacrifice flies (5), tied seventh for both hits (80) and RBI (66), and ranked eighth the SEC with a .352 batting average. He was honored as SEC Player of the Week after MSU's series against Missouri, and selected to represent Mississippi State as a finalist for the Ferriss Trophy—an annual award given to the top college baseball player in Mississippi—which was ultimately won by Southern Miss pitcher JB Middleton. Reese was also a semifinalist for the Dick Howser Trophy.

After recognition as SEC Newcomer of the Year and selection to the 2025 All-SEC First Baseball Team, Reese was named to the National Collegiate Baseball Writers Association (NCBWA) All-America First Team, Baseball America and American Baseball Coaches Association (ABCA)-Rawlings All-America Second Teams, and Perfect Game All-America Third Team, all as a third baseman or infielder. He was further selected by D1Baseball to its All-America Second Team as a designated hitter. Despite rumors of Reese entering the transfer portal during the offseason, he later confirmed he would return to play for the Bulldogs for the 2026 season.

Reese began the summer playing for the Chatham Anglers of the Cape Cod Baseball League (CCBL), before he was selected to the 2025 Team USA Collegiate National Team to represent Team USA in their annual Japan Collegiate All-Star Series in Hokkaido, Japan.

In August, Reese was identified by Baseball America as one of the top 10 future MLB draft prospects from the 2025 Team USA Collegiate National Team with early-round draft pick potential. It was announced on September 19 by head coach Brian O'Connor that Reese would miss Mississippi State's fall practice after undergoing toe surgery, but that he was expected to be ready for the start of the new season. In early December, MLB Pipeline ranked Reese 18th of the top 100 MLB draft prospects for 2026.

As a junior for the Bulldogs in 2026, Reese slashed .336/.432/.721 with 24 home runs and 74 RBI.

== Professional career ==
Reese was selected by the Seattle Mariners in the first round with the 24th overall pick of the 2026 Major League Baseball draft. On the same day, he signed with the Mariners for a below-slot $3.5 million signing bonus (with the slot value being around $3.82 million).

Reese made his professional debut after signing with the Single-A Inland Empire 66ers.
