= Jairo Iriarte =

Venezuelan baseball player (born 2001)

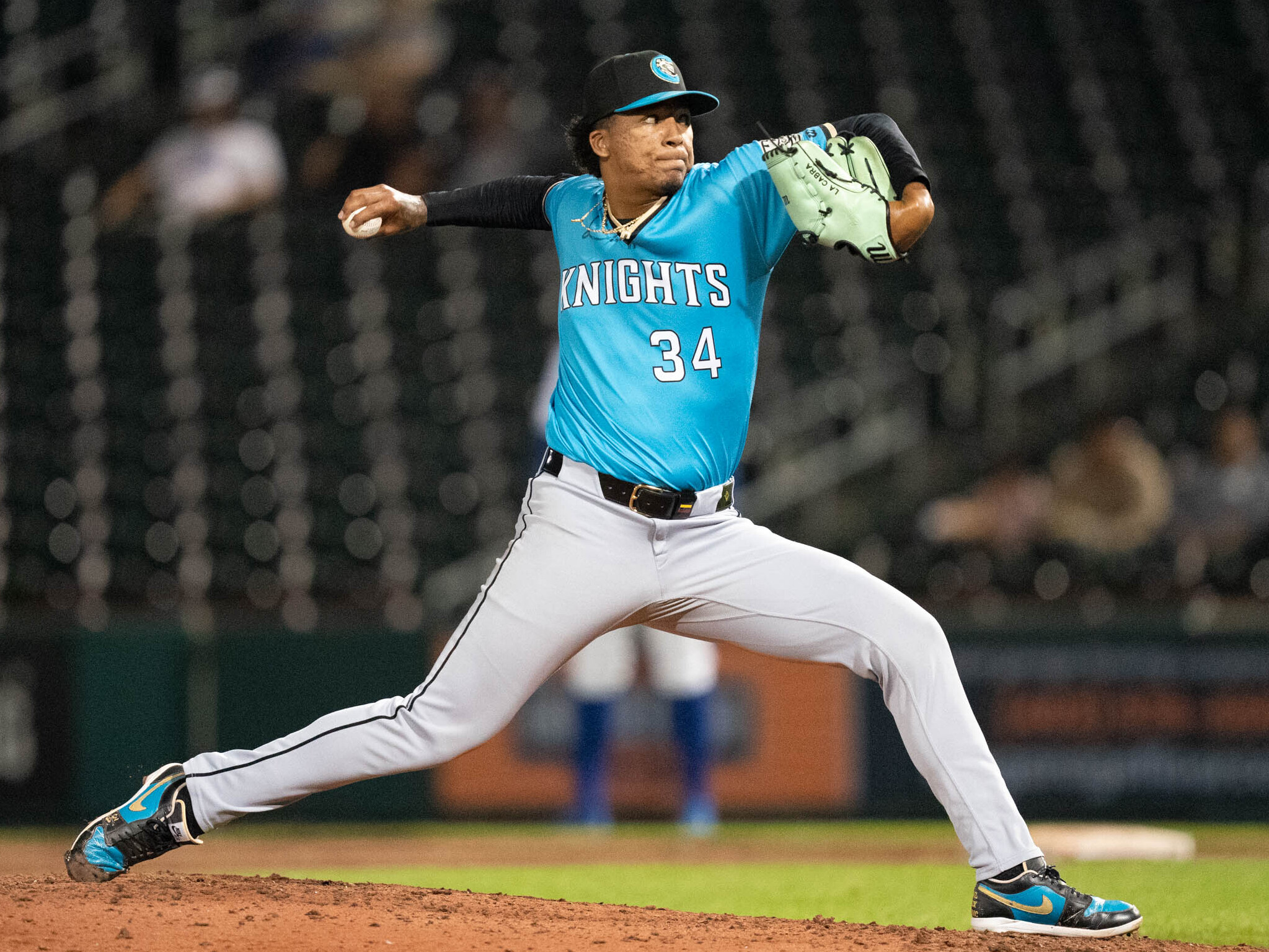
- Iriarte with the Charlotte Knights in 2025

Free agent
- Pitcher
- Born: December 15, 2001 (age 24); La Guaira, Venezuela
- Bats: Right Throws: Right

MLB debut
- September 3, 2024, for the Chicago White Sox

MLB statistics (through 2024 season)
- Win–loss record: 0–1
- Earned run average: 1.50
- Strikeouts: 6
- Stats at Baseball Reference

Teams
- Chicago White Sox (2024)

Jairo Alejandro Iriarte (born December 15, 2001) is a Venezuelan professional baseball pitcher who is a free agent. He made his Major League Baseball (MLB) debut in 2024.

== Career ==
=== San Diego Padres ===
Iriarte signed with the San Diego Padres as an international free agent on July 2, 2018, for a $75,000 signing bonus. He made his professional debut in 2019 with the DSL Padres of the Rookie-level Dominican Summer League, going 1–2 with a 3.31 ERA and 21 strikeouts over 35 1/3 innings. Iriarte did not play in a game in 2020 due to the cancellation of the minor league season because of the COVID-19 pandemic. Iriarte split the 2021 season between the AZL Padres of the Rookie-level Arizona League and the Lake Elsinore Storm of the Low-A West, going a combined 0–5 with an 11.40 ERA and 34 strikeouts over 30 innings. He returned to Lake Elsinore for the 2022 season, going 4–7 with a 5.12 ERA and 109 strikeouts over 91 1/3 innings. Iriarte opened the 2023 season with the Fort Wayne TinCaps of the Midwest League, going 3–3 with a 3.10 ERA and 77 strikeouts over 61 innings. He was promoted to the San Antonio Missions of the Double-A Texas League on July 14.

On November 14, 2023, the Padres added Iriarte to their 40-man roster to protect him from the Rule 5 draft.

=== Chicago White Sox ===
On March 13, 2024, the Padres traded Iriarte, Steven Wilson, Drew Thorpe, and Samuel Zavala to the Chicago White Sox in exchange for Dylan Cease. Upon his acquisition, he was optioned to the Triple–A Charlotte Knights. However, Iriarte began the year with the Double–A Birmingham Barons, compiling a 5–7 record and 3.71 ERA with 122 strikeouts over 23 games (22 starts). On September 1, Iriarte was promoted to the major leagues for the first time.

Iriate made his Major League debut on September 3 in a relief appearance against the Baltimore Orioles, going one inning, allowing one hit, walking two, and giving up one earned run. He ended his night with one strikeout, the first of his career, against Colton Cowser. In six appearances for the White Sox during his rookie campaign, Iriarte compiled an 0-1 record and 1.50 ERA with six strikeouts over six innings of work.

Iriarte was optioned to Triple-A Charlotte to begin the 2025 season. In 35 appearances (five starts) for the Knights, he struggled to a 2-3 record and 7.24 ERA with 48 strikeouts and one save over 46 innings of work. Iriarte was designated for assignment by the White Sox on February 1, 2026. He cleared waivers and was sent outright to Charlotte on February 6. In 2026, he played in 45 games between Triple-A and Double-A he threw 64.1 innings of relief going 8-4 with a 2.52 ERA with 64 strikeouts and 2 saves. He elected free agency on November 2.
