= Fresno Grizzlies =

- Founded in 1998; Fresno, California

Minor league affiliations
- Class: Single-A (2021–present)
- Previous classes: Triple-A (1998–2020)
- League: California League (2021–present)
- Division: North Division
- Previous leagues: Pacific Coast League (1998–2020)

Major league affiliations
- Team: Colorado Rockies (2021–present)
- Previous teams: Washington Nationals (2019–2020); Houston Astros (2015–2018); San Francisco Giants (1998–2014)

Minor league titles
- Class titles (1): 2015
- League titles (1): 2015
- Conference titles (2): 2015; 2018
- Division titles (5): 1998; 2015; 2018; 2021; 2022
- First-half titles (1): 2022
- Second-half titles (2): 2022; 2025

Team data
- Name: Fresno Grizzlies (1998–present)
- Colors: Scarlet, black, beige, brown
- Mascot: Parker T. Bear
- Ballpark: Chukchansi Park (2002–present)
- Previous parks: Pete Beiden Field (1998–2001)
- Owner/ Operator: Diamond Baseball Holdings
- General manager: Derek Franks
- Manager: Cesar Galvez
- Website: milb.com/fresno

The Fresno Grizzlies are a Minor League Baseball team of the California League and the Single-A affiliate of the Colorado Rockies. They are located in Fresno, California, and play their home games at Chukchansi Park, which was opened in 2002 in downtown Fresno. They previously played at Fresno State's Pete Beiden Field from 1998 to 2001.

The Grizzlies were established in 1998 as members of the Triple-A Pacific Coast League (PCL). They won the PCL championship in 2015, making it the only league title in franchise history. Fresno was transferred to the Low-A West in 2021, but this was renamed the California League in 2022.

== History ==
=== Prior professional baseball in Fresno ===
Professional baseball first came to Fresno in 1898 when it had a team in the original California League. The team dropped out of the league after that year but returned in 1905. In 1906, the Tacoma Tigers of the Pacific Coast League moved to Fresno, playing as the Fresno Raisin Eaters for one season before moving to Sacramento for the 1907 season. Fresno fielded teams in the California State League in 1910 and 1913. It was then a mainstay in the current California League from 1941 through 1988 as the Cardinals (1941–1956), Sun Sox (1957), Giants (1958–1987), and Suns (1988).

=== San Francisco Giants (1998–2014) ===
When Major League Baseball awarded an expansion team (the Arizona Diamondbacks) to Phoenix, Arizona, that would begin playing in 1998, the Phoenix Firebirds of the Pacific Coast League (the San Francisco Giants' Triple-A affiliate) were forced to move. The Firebirds moved to Tucson, Arizona and changed their name to the Tucson Sidewinders while changing their affiliation to the Diamondbacks. That prompted the Tucson Toros to move to Fresno, giving Fresno its first PCL team since 1906. The Toros were renamed the Grizzlies and became the Giants' new Triple-A affiliate.

From 1998 through 2001, the Grizzlies played at Pete Beiden Field at California State University, Fresno, before moving to Chukchansi Park.

During the team's 11-year history in Fresno, it has had several different owners. In October 2005, the team was sold again, this time to Fresno Baseball Club LLC, headquartered in Delaware.

The team hosted such promotions as K-Fed Night and Second Chance Night in 2006; The Price Is Right Night in 2007; and Totally Rad 80s Night featuring The Karate Kid star Billy Zabka in May 2008.

Parker, the Grizzlies mascot, was named Best Mascot of 2007 by GameOps, beating out all other major and minor league mascots. The Grizzlies former mascot, Wild Thing, "retired" in 2006 after eight years as the team's mascot. Chukchansi Park is also home to the Drag Kings, the Grizzlies' dancing grounds crew who were given an honorable mention by GameOps as Best Entertainment act. The Grizzlies won the Minor League Baseball Promotion of the Year award in 2008 for their "Mascot Showdown" featuring Parker and the Phillie Phanatic. The team's opening day catcher in 2010, Buster Posey, would be the San Francisco Giants' starting catcher for the World Series six months later (the Giants' starting catcher for most of their World Championship season, Bengie Molina, would start for their opponents, the Texas Rangers), resulting in his National League Rookie of the Year award that year.

=== Houston Astros (2015–2018) ===
In 2015, Fresno became an affiliate of the Houston Astros. That season, they won the Triple-A Baseball National Championship Game by defeating the Columbus Clippers, 7–0, in El Paso, Texas.

Following the 2017 season, Grizzlies manager Tony DeFrancesco announced he would not return to the Houston Astros organization for the 2018 season. DeFrancesco led Fresno to a winning record in each of his three seasons at the helm, his clubs compiling a record of 234–194 (.547) from 2015 to 2017. The run marked the first time in franchise history (since 1998) the Grizzlies completed three consecutive winning seasons.

On January 19, 2018, Rodney Linares was named the 10th manager in Grizzlies history. The team was sold to Fresno Sports and Events, a group led by Ray and Michael Baker, part owners of the Colorado Rockies and Grand Junction Rockies, and Jim Coufos, a prior investor in the High Desert Mavericks, in a transaction that was made official on February 27, 2018.

The Astros declined to renew their player-development contract with Fresno beyond the 2018 season.

=== Washington Nationals (2019–2020) ===
The team unveiled new logos, colors, and uniforms for the 2019 season. While retaining the Grizzlies name and grizzly bear imagery, the team switched to a red, black, beige, and brown color scheme with logos and uniforms that resemble the flag of California.

Fresno also gained a new major league affiliate for 2019. The Grizzlies and Washington Nationals agreed to a player development contract for the 2019 and 2020 seasons. The start of the 2020 season was postponed due to the COVID-19 pandemic before being cancelled on June 30. In conjunction with Major League Baseball's reorganization of the minors after the 2020 season, the Washington Nationals opted to discontinue their affiliation with the Grizzlies, leaving them in need of a new affiliate.

=== Colorado Rockies (2021–present) ===
In conjunction with Major League Baseball's restructuring of Minor League Baseball in 2021, the Grizzlies were transferred to the Low-A West as the Low-A classification affiliate of the Colorado Rockies. They won the 2021 Northern Division title with a 74–41 record. In the best-of-five league championship series, Fresno was defeated by the San Jose Giants, 3–0. Zac Veen was selected as the league's Top MLB Prospect, and Robinson Cancel won its Manager of the Year Award. In 2022, the Low-A West became known as the California League, the name historically used by the regional circuit prior to the 2021 reorganization, and was reclassified as a Single-A circuit.

== Season-by-season records ==
Table key
| League | The team's final position in the league standings |
| Division | The team's final position in the divisional standings |
| GB | Games behind the team that finished in first place in the division that season |
| ‡ | Class champions (1998–2020) |
| † | League champions (1998–present) |
| § | Conference champions (1998–2020) |
| * | Division champions (1998–present) |

Season-by-season records
| Season | League | Regular season | | | | | Postseason | | | MLB affiliate | Ref. |
| Season | League | Record | Win % | League | Division | GB | Record | Win % | Result | MLB affiliate | Ref. |
|---|---|---|---|---|---|---|---|---|---|---|---|
| 1998 * | PCL | 81–62 | .566 | 2nd (tie) | 1st | — | 2–3 | .400 | Result | Won Pacific Conference Southern Division title Lost Pacific Conference title vs. Calgary Cannons, 3–2 | San Francisco Giants |
| 1999 | PCL | 73–69 | .514 | 7th | 2nd | 1/2 | — | — | — | San Francisco Giants | |
| 2000 | PCL | 57–84 | .404 | 15th | 4th | 31 1/2 | — | — | — | San Francisco Giants | |
| 2001 | PCL | 68–71 | .489 | 9th | 2nd | 4 1/2 | — | — | — | San Francisco Giants | |
| 2002 | PCL | 57–87 | .396 | 16th | 4th | 28 | — | — | — | San Francisco Giants | |
| 2003 | PCL | 55–88 | .385 | 16th | 4th | 36 1/2 | — | — | — | San Francisco Giants | |
| 2004 | PCL | 62–82 | .431 | 15th | 4th | 17 | — | — | — | San Francisco Giants | |
| 2005 | PCL | 68–76 | .472 | 11th (tie) | 2nd (tie) | 12 | — | — | — | San Francisco Giants | |
| 2006 | PCL | 61–83 | .424 | 14th | 4th | 30 | — | — | — | San Francisco Giants | |
| 2007 | PCL | 77–67 | .535 | 4th | 2nd | 7 | — | — | — | San Francisco Giants | |
| 2008 | PCL | 67–76 | .469 | 11th | 3rd | 15 1/2 | — | — | — | San Francisco Giants | |
| 2009 | PCL | 71–73 | .493 | 10th (tie) | 3rd (tie) | 15 1/2 | — | — | — | San Francisco Giants | |
| 2010 | PCL | 75–69 | .521 | 6th | 2nd | 4 | — | — | — | San Francisco Giants | |
| 2011 | PCL | 65–79 | .451 | 13th (tie) | 3rd (tie) | 23 | — | — | — | San Francisco Giants | |
| 2012 | PCL | 74–70 | .514 | 9th | 3rd | 12 | — | — | — | San Francisco Giants | |
| 2013 | PCL | 68–75 | .476 | 12th | 4th | 12 1/2 | — | — | — | San Francisco Giants | |
| 2014 | PCL | 68–76 | .472 | 13th | 4th | 13 | — | — | — | San Francisco Giants | |
| 2015 * § † ‡ | PCL | 84–59 | .587 | 2nd | 1st | — | 7–3 | .700 | Won Pacific Conference Northern Division title Won Pacific Conference title vs. El Paso Chihuahuas, 3–1; Won PCL championship vs. Round Rock Express, 3–2; Won Triple-A championship vs. Columbus Clippers | Houston Astros | |
| 2016 | PCL | 73–70 | .510 | 5th (tie) | 3rd | 8 | — | — | — | Houston Astros | |
| 2017 | PCL | 77–65 | .542 | 4th | 2nd | 3 | — | — | — | Houston Astros | |
| 2018 * § | PCL | 82–57 | .590 | 2nd (tie) | 1st | — | 4–5 | .444 | Won Pacific Conference Northern Division title Won Pacific Conference title vs. El Paso Chihuahuas, 3–2; Lost PCL championship vs. Memphis Redbirds, 3–1 | Houston Astros | |
| 2019 | PCL | 65–75 | .464 | 11th | 3rd | 8 | — | — | — | Washington Nationals | |
| 2020 | PCL | Season cancelled (COVID-19 pandemic) | | | | | | | | Washington Nationals | |
| 2021 * | A-W | 74–41 | .643 | 1st | 1st | — | 0–3 | .000 | Lost Low-A West championship vs. San Jose Giants, 3–0. | Colorado Rockies | |
| 2022 * | CAL | 83–49 | .629 | 1st | 1st | – | 2–2 | .500 | Won North Division title Won Cal League semifinals vs. San Jose Giants 2–0; Lost Cal League championship to Lake Elsinore Storm 0–2 | Colorado Rockies | |
| 2023 * | CAL | 78–54 | .591 | 1st | 1st | – | — | — | Won North Division title | Colorado Rockies | |
| 2024 | CAL | 67-64 | .511 | 4th | 3rd | 7 | – | – | – | Colorado Rockies | |
| 2025 | CAL | 70-62 | .530 | 2nd | 2nd | 11 | 0-2 | .000 | Won 2nd half division title. Lost Cal League semifinals 2-0 vs. San Jose Giants | Colorado Rockies | |
| Totals | — | 1,833–1,819 | .502 | — | — | — | 15–18 | .455 | — | — | — |

== Popular culture ==
The 2012 family film Parental Guidance features Billy Crystal as the radio voice of the Fresno Grizzlies. The Grizzlies gained national attention in summer 2015 for playing a game as The Fresno Tacos, which was done to celebrate the city of Fresno's annual Taco Truck Throwdown and came complete with a specially designed tacos uniform.

The main character of the 2023 sitcom Not Dead Yet, Nell Serrano, is a fan of the Fresno Grizzlies. The seventh episode of season one, Not Out of the Game Yet, involves her writing the obituary for the Grizzlies former color commentator.

== Radio ==
All games are broadcast on the Fresno Grizzlies website, with Tim Slack starting as the play-by-play voice in 2025. Select games are broadcast on 790am KFPT or 1430am KFIG.

== Roster ==
Fresno Grizzlies roster
| Players | Coaches/Other |
|---|---|
| Pitchers: 19 Luichi Casilla; 24 Ethan Cole; 18 Yanzel Correa; 11 Ben Davis; 14 Redinson Gomez; 40 Marcos Herrera; 26 Grif Hughes; 10 Sam Larson; 28 Riley Kelly; 11 Easton Marks; 44 Izeah Muniz; 45 Austin Newton; 28 Manuel Olivarez; 20 Sandy Ozuna; 32 Brady Parker; 49 Wilmis Paulino; 28 Tanner Sagouspe; 21 Bryson Van Sickle; Catchers: 31 Jesus Freitez; 3 Daniel Jackson; 5 Jack Natili; Infielders: 9 Ashly Andujar; 8 Sebastian Blanco; 1 Juan Martinez; 2 Ryan Niedzwiedz; 22 Aidan Redahan; 29 Ronny Ugarte; Outfielders: 16 Cristian Arguelles; 23 Kyle Fossum; 4 Cort MacDonald; 25 Carlos Renzullo; 34 Landyn Vidourek | Manager: 6 Cesar Galvez; Coaches: 27 Geoff Brown (pitching); 12 Greg Jones (hitting); -- Jeremiah Stewart (performance); 30 Gary Templeton III (bench); 60-day injured list: 26 Tyrelle Chadwick; -- Zach Harris; 7 Ethan Holliday; -- Luke Jewett; 10 JB Middleton (full season); -- Zack Morris (full season); 13 Zach Rogacki; 25 Derrick Smith (full season); 7-day injured list; * On Colorado Rockies 40-man roster; ~ Development list; # Rehab assignment; ∞ Reserve list; ‡ Restricted list; § Suspended list; † Temporarily inactive list; Roster updated September 1, 2026; Transactions; → More rosters: MiLB • California League; → Colorado Rockies minor league players |

== Notable alumni ==
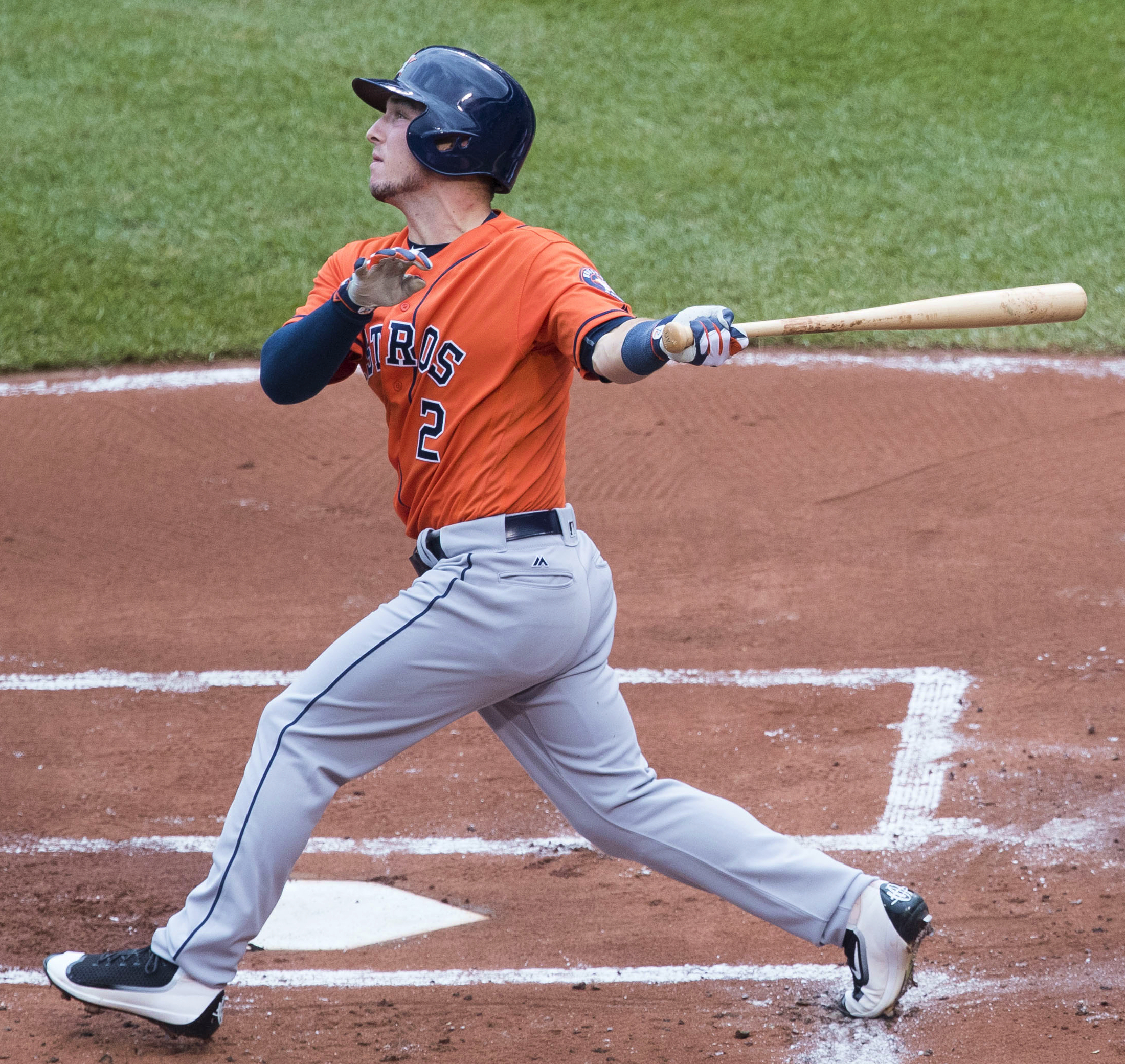
Alex Bregman

- Yordan Alvarez, MLB designated hitter/outfielder
- Brandon Belt, MLB first baseman
- Alex Bregman, MLB third baseman/shortstop for the Houston Astros
- Madison Bumgarner, MLB starting pitcher
- Pat Burrell, MLB outfielder
- Matt Cain, MLB starting pitcher
- Carlos Correa, MLB shortstop
- Brandon Crawford, MLB shortstop for the St. Louis Cardinals
- J. D. Davis (born 1993), third baseman for the Oakland Athletics
- Adam Duvall, MLB outfielder
- Teoscar Hernandez, MLB outfielder
- Tim Lincecum, MLB starting pitcher
- Joe Nathan, MLB closer
- Joe Panik, MLB second baseman
- Yusmeiro Petit, MLB pitcher
- Buster Posey, MLB catcher
- Sergio Romo, MLB closer
- Garrett Stubbs, MLB catcher
- Brian Wilson, MLB closer
