= C Spire Ferriss Trophy =

College baseball award in Mississippi, US

- C Spire Ferriss Trophy
- Awarded for: Mississippi Collegiate Baseball Player of the Year
- Country: United States

History
- First award: 2004
- Most recent: JB Middleton, Southern Mississippi

The C Spire Ferriss Trophy was created in the fall of 2003 by the Mississippi Sports Hall of Fame to honor the Mississippi Collegiate Baseball Player of the Year. The trophy bears the name and likeness of Dave Ferriss. The trophy is cosponsored by C Spire Wireless.

== Winners ==
Later played in MLB

Year	Player	Position	Team	Ref(s)	Other finalists
2004	Stephen Head	IF/P	Ole Miss Rebels		Brad Corley, OF, Mississippi State; Jarrett Hoffpauir, IF, Southern Miss
2005	Brian Pettway	OF	Ole Miss Rebels		Stephen Head, IF/P, Ole Miss; Craig Newton, C, Delta State; Garner Wetzel, OF, Millsaps
2006	Thomas Berkery	IF	Mississippi State Bulldogs		Toddrick Johnson, OF, Southern Miss; Zach Penpraise, IF Mississippi Valley State
2007	Ed Easley	C	Mississippi State Bulldogs		Zack Cozart, SS, Ole Miss; Thomas Royals, P, Belhaven
2008	Scott Bittle	P	Ole Miss Rebels		Tyler Conn, C, Southern Miss; Rickey Noland, C, Delta State
2009	Craig Westcott	IF/P	Belhaven Blazers		Scott Bittle, 1B, Ole Miss; Brian Dozier, 2B, Southern Miss
2010	Drew Pomeranz	P	Ole Miss Rebels		Todd McInnis, P, Southern Miss; Connor Powers, 1B, Mississippi State
2011	Tyler Koelling	OF	Southern Miss Golden Eagles		Jarrod Parks, 3B, Mississippi State; B. A. Vollmuth, SS, Southern Miss
2012	Chris Stratton	P	Mississippi State Bulldogs		Colton Mitchell, P, Delta State; Alex Yarbrough, 2B, Ole Miss
2013	Hunter Renfroe	OF	Mississippi State Bulldogs		Josh Branstetter, P, Delta State; Andrew Pierce, P, Southern Miss; Stuart Turner, C, Ole Miss; Bobby Wahl, P, Ole Miss
2014	Auston Bousfield	OF	Ole Miss Rebels		Tyler Akins, P/1B, Belhaven; Chris Ellis, P, Ole Miss; Jacob Lindgren, P, Mississippi State; Ross Mitchell, P, Mississippi State
2015	James McMahon	P	Southern Miss Golden Eagles		Wes Rea, 1B, Mississippi State; Melvin Rodriguez, IF, Jackson State; Keith Shumaker, P/IF, Millsaps; Scott Weathersby, P, Ole Miss
2016	Jake Mangum	OF	Mississippi State Bulldogs		Dakota Hudson, P, Mississippi State; Reid Humphreys, IF/P, Mississippi State; Will Robertson, OF, Delta State; J. B. Woodman, OF, Ole Miss
2017	Brent Rooker	1B	Mississippi State Bulldogs		Taylor Braley, 3B/P, Southern Miss; Dylan Burdeaux, 1B, Southern Miss; Zach Shannon, 1B/P, Delta State; Matt Wallner, OF/P, Southern Miss
2018	Nick Sandlin	P	Southern Miss Golden Eagles		Jake Mangum, OF, Mississippi State; Ryan Olenek, IF/OF, Ole Miss; Luke Reynolds, IF, Southern Miss; Zach Shannon, 1B/P, Delta State
2019	Jake Mangum	OF	Mississippi State Bulldogs		Tyler Keenen, 3B, Ole Miss; Grae Kessinger, SS, Ole Miss; Ethan Small, P, Mississippi State; Matt Wallner, OF, Southern Miss
2021	Tanner Allen	OF	Mississippi State Bulldogs		Kevin Graham, OF, Ole Miss; Gunnar Hoglund, P, Ole Miss; Doug Nikhazy, P, Ole Miss; Landon Sims, P, Mississippi State
2022	Tanner Hall	P	Southern Miss Golden Eagles		Tim Elko, IF/OF, Ole Miss; RJ Yeager, IF, Mississippi State; Harrison Haley, P, Delta State; Brett Sanchez, P, Belhaven
2023	Kemp Alderman	OF/C	Ole Miss Rebels		Ty Hill, IF, Jackson State; Hunter Hines, IF/OF, Mississippi State; Slade Wilks, OF, Southern Miss; Tanner Hall, P, Southern Miss
2024	Dakota Jordan	OF	Mississippi State Bulldogs		Ethan Lege, OF, Ole Miss; Dalton McIntyre, OF, Southern Miss; Brett Sanchez, P, Belhaven; RJ Stinson, OF, William Carey
2025	JB Middleton	P	Southern Miss Golden Eagles		Drake Fontenot, P, Delta State; Luke Hill, 3B, Ole Miss; Nick Monistere, 2B, Southern Miss Golden Eagles; Ace Reese, 3B, Mississippi State Bulldogs
2026	Tomas Valincius	P	Mississippi State Bulldogs		Ace Reese, 3B, Mississippi State Bulldogs; Judd Utermark, IF, Ole Miss; Cade Townsend, P, Ole Miss; Grayden Harris, P, Southern Miss Golden Eagles

== Trophies won by school ==
Rank	School	Trophies	Finalists
1	Mississippi State	9	23
2	Ole Miss	6	24
3	Southern Miss	5	21
4	Belhaven	1	5
5	Delta State	0	9
	Jackson State	0	2
	Millsaps	0	2
	Mississippi Valley State	0	1
	William Carey	0	1
Total		20	84

Updated through 2023 results.
Award was not presented in 2020 due to the COVID-19 shortened season

== See also ==
- Howell Trophy - award given annually to the best men's college basketball player in the state of Mississippi by the Mississippi Sports Hall of Fame.
- Gillom Trophy - award given annually to the best women's college basketball player in the state of Mississippi by the Mississippi Sports Hall of Fame.
- Conerly Trophy - an award given annually to the best college football player in the state of Mississippi by the Mississippi Sports Hall of Fame.
- Hull Trophy- an award given annually to the best college offensive lineman in Mississippi by the Mississippi Sports Hall of Fame.
