= Kemp Alderman =

American baseball player (born 2002)

Miami Marlins
- Outfielder
- Born: August 20, 2002 (age 23); Decatur, Mississippi, U.S.
- Bats: Right Throws: Right
- Stats at Baseball Reference

Riley Kemp Alderman (born August 20, 2002) is an American professional baseball outfielder in the Miami Marlins organization.

== Amateur career ==
Alderman grew up in Decatur, Mississippi and attended Newton County Academy, where he played baseball, basketball, and eight-man football. As a junior, he batted .569 with 12 home runs and 41 RBIs while also pitching to a 8–3 record with a 2.83 ERA and 90 strikeouts. Alderman committed to play college baseball at Ole Miss.

Alderman played in eight games during his freshman season with the Ole Miss Rebels and hit for a .125 average with one home run. After the season he played collegiate summer baseball for the Bethesda Big Train of the Cal Ripken Collegiate Baseball League, where he led the league with eight home runs and 47 RBIs. As a sophomore, Alderman served as the Rebels' primary designated hitter and hit .286 with 11 home runs, 15 doubles, and 45 RBIs as Ole Miss won the 2022 College World Series. He spent the summer playing for the Fond du Lac Dock Spiders of the Northwoods League. Alderman was awarded the C Spire Ferriss Trophy as the top collegiate baseball player in the State of Mississippi at the end of his junior season after batting .376 with 19 home runs and 61 RBIs.

== Professional career ==
The Miami Marlins selected Alderman 47th overall in the 2023 Major League Baseball draft. Alderman signed with the Marlins on July 21, 2023, for $1,400,000.

Alderman made his professional debut after signing with the Jupiter Hammerheads, appearing in 34 games and hitting .205 with one home run and 15 RBI. In 2024, Alderman played with Jupiter, the Beloit Snappers, and the Pensacola Blue Wahoos, and also appeared in five games with the Florida Complex League Marlins on a rehab appearance following a broken hamate bone. Over 77 games played in 2024, Alderman batted .242 with eight home runs and 46 RBIs. After the season, he played in the Arizona Fall League with the Peoria Javelinas. Alderman opened the 2025 season with Pensacola and was promoted to the Jacksonville Jumbo Shrimp in August. Over 130 games across both affiliates, Alderman hit .285 with 22 home runs, 70 RBI, and 22 stolen bases.
