= Jacob Gonzalez =

American baseball player (born 2002)

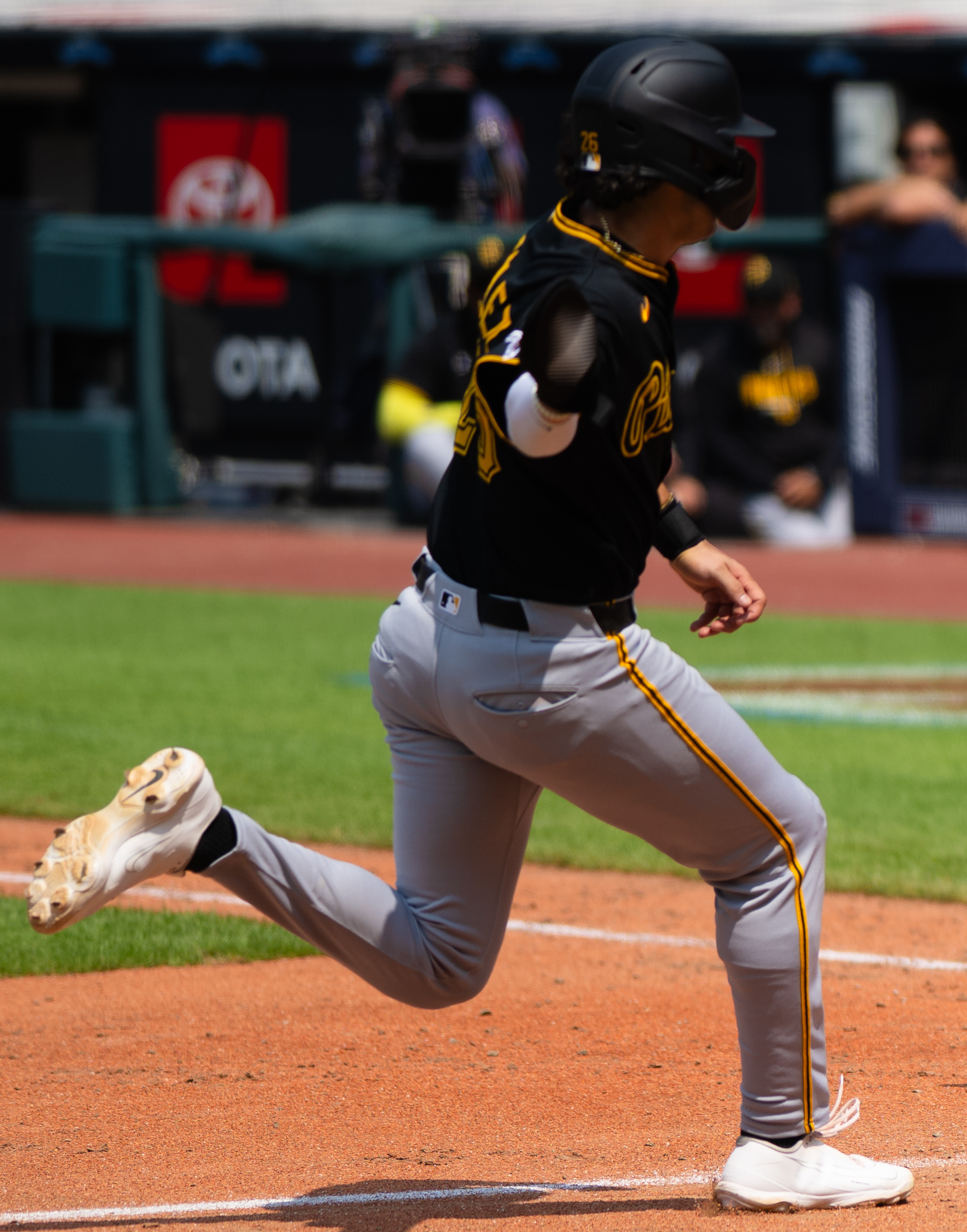
- Gonzalez with the Pittsburgh Pirates in 2026

Pittsburgh Pirates – No. 26
- Infielder
- Born: May 30, 2002 (age 24); Glendora, California, U.S.
- Bats: Left Throws: Right

MLB debut
- May 31, 2026, for the Chicago White Sox

MLB statistics (through 2026 season)
- Batting average: .220
- Home runs: 7
- Runs batted in: 31
- Stats at Baseball Reference

Teams
- Chicago White Sox (2026); Pittsburgh Pirates (2026–present)

Jacob Jesus Gonzalez (born May 30, 2002) is an American professional baseball infielder for the Pittsburgh Pirates of Major League Baseball (MLB). He has previously played in MLB for the Chicago White Sox.

Gonzalez played college baseball for the Ole Miss Rebels and was selected by the White Sox in the first round of the 2023 MLB draft. He made his MLB debut in 2026 with the White Sox. Shortly after his debut, the White Sox traded Gonzalez to the Pirates.

== Early life ==
Jacob Jesus Gonzalez was born on May 30, 2002, in Glendora, California. His father, Jess, was a professional baseball pitcher in the minor leagues and independent leagues from 1994 to 1996. Gonzalez grew up in Glendora, playing travel baseball with SGV Hustle in addition to playing for Glendora American Little League. He attended Glendora High School where he was a four-year letterman in both football as a quarterback and baseball as an infielder.

Gonzalez became the starting quarterback for Glendora in 2018–19, his junior year of high school. He accumulated 1,520 passing yards during the regular season, among the most in the CIF Southern Section (CIF-SS). In 2019–20, his senior year, Gonzalez led Glendora to a 9–1 regular season record and was named to the All-CIF-SS Division 5 team. He finished his high school football career with 4,487 yards, 62 total touchdowns, and 15 interceptions.

In 2016–17, his freshman season with the Glendora baseball team, Gonzalez posted a .396 batting average with five doubles and 25 runs batted in (RBIs). In December 2017, prior to his sophomore season, he committed to play college baseball for the Ole Miss Rebels. He finished his second year batting .398 with seven doubles and 25 RBIs and struck out only five times. In Gonzalez's 2018–19 junior season, he improved his batting average to .420 with three home runs, eight doubles, and 23 RBIs. Midway through his 2019–20 senior year, Gonzalez was batting .346 with two doubles and five RBIs before the baseball season was prematurely canceled in response to the COVID-19 pandemic. For his high school baseball career, he batted .390 with 119 hits, four home runs, and 74 RBIs. After going undrafted in the abridged 2020 Major League Baseball draft, Gonzalez honored his commitment to enroll at Ole Miss.

== College career ==
Gonzalez was named the starting shortstop for Ole Miss as a freshman in 2021. Over 67 starts, he batted .355 with 12 home runs, 55 RBIs, and 16 doubles. He was named to the All-SEC First Team, was named Freshman of the Year by D1Baseball, and was named an All-American by D1Baseball and the National Collegiate Baseball Writers Association. He was just the second player in Ole Miss baseball history to be named an All-American as a freshman. He returned as the team's starting shortstop and began batting in the leadoff spot in 2022. Gonzalez ended the 2022 season slashing .273/.405/.558 with 18 home runs and 52 RBIs over 65 games, leading Ole Miss to their first ever NCAA Championship. Following the season's end, he played with the USA Baseball Collegiate National Team. For the 2023 season with Ole Miss, Gonzalez played in 54 games and hit .327 with ten home runs, 51 RBIs, and 18 doubles.

== Professional career ==
=== Chicago White Sox ===
The Chicago White Sox selected Gonzalez in the first round, with the 15th overall pick, in the 2023 Major League Baseball draft. He signed with the team for $3.9 million.

Gonzalez made his professional debut with the Arizona League White Sox and was later promoted to the Kannapolis Cannon Ballers. Over 34 games between the two teams, he hit .211 with one home run and 17 RBI. He was assigned to the Winston-Salem Dash to open the 2024 season. In mid-May, he was promoted to the Birmingham Barons. Over 130 games between the two teams, Gonzalez batted .238 with eight home runs, 57 RBI, and 17 stolen bases.

Gonzalez returned to Birmingham to open the 2025 season. In late July, he was promoted to the Charlotte Knights. Gonzalez played in 134 games for the season and hit .232 with eight home runs, 61 RBI, 17 stolen bases, and 26 doubles. Gonzalez was assigned to Charlotte to begin the 2026 season.

On May 30, 2026, the White Sox selected Gonzalez's contract to the 40-man roster and promoted him to the major leagues for the first time. At the time of his promotion, he had a .317 batting average with 19 home runs and 62 RBI over 52 games with Charlotte. Gonzalez made his MLB debut on May 31 as the team's starting first baseman and recorded his first MLB hit, a single off Detroit Tigers pitcher Drew Anderson, in the seventh inning. He recorded his first MLB home run on June 6 against Andrew Painter of the Philadelphia Phillies. Gonzalez made 30 appearances for the White Sox, slashing .244/.323/.360 with two home runs and 17 RBI.

=== Pittsburgh Pirates ===
On July 10, 2026, the White Sox traded Gonzalez, alongside Brandon Eisert, to the Pittsburgh Pirates in exchange for the 34th overall pick in the 2026 Major League Baseball draft and Jaden Woods. He played in 51 games for the Pirates and batted .203 with five home runs and 14 RBI.

== Personal life ==
Gonzalez is a Christian. He has said, “I believe that since God has given me the gift of playing baseball, I start each game with the mindset that the glory is His. I have started writing ‘Audience of One’ in the dirt before each game to remind me that it all points back to Him.”
