= Charlotte Knights =

- Founded in 1976; Charlotte, North Carolina
Team logo
Cap insignia

Minor league affiliations
- Class: Triple-A (1993–present)
- Previous classes: Double-A (1976–1992)
- League: International League (1993–present)
- Division: East Division
- Previous leagues: Southern League (1976–1992)

Major league affiliations
- Team: Chicago White Sox (1999–present)
- Previous teams: Florida Marlins (1995–1998); Cleveland Indians (1993–1994); Chicago Cubs (1989–1992); Baltimore Orioles (1976–1988)

Minor league titles
- League titles (4): 1980; 1984; 1993; 1999
- Division titles (7): 1980; 1984; 1985; 1987; 1993; 2006; 2012
- First-half titles (4): 1976; 1979; 1980; 1987
- Second-half titles (2): 1984; 1985
- Wild card berths (1): 1999

Team data
- Name: Charlotte Knights (1988–present)
- Previous names: Charlotte Orioles (1976–1987)
- Colors: Black, blue, gold, silver, white
- Mascot: Homer the Dragon
- Ballpark: Truist Field (2014–present)
- Previous parks: Knights Stadium (1990–2013); Knights Castle (1989); Knights Park (1976–1988)
- Owner/ Operator: Diamond Baseball Holdings
- General manager: Rob Egan
- Manager: Chad Pinder
- Website: milb.com/charlotte-knights

The Charlotte Knights are a Minor League Baseball team of the International League and the Triple-A affiliate of the Chicago White Sox. They are located in Charlotte, North Carolina, and play their home games at Truist Field, which opened in 2014 and is located in Uptown Charlotte. The team previously played at Knights Park (1976–1988), Knights Castle (1989), and Knights Stadium (1990–2013).

Established as a Double-A franchise of the Southern League in 1976, the team was known as the Charlotte Orioles, or Charlotte O's, through 1987. The O's won the Southern League championship twice: in 1980 and 1984 as the Double-A affiliate of the Baltimore Orioles. They were rebranded as the Charlotte Knights in 1988.

The Knights were replaced by a Triple-A International League team in conjunction with the 1993 Major League Baseball (MLB) expansion. The Triple-A Knights carried on the history of the Double-A team that preceded them. In conjunction with MLB's restructuring of Minor League Baseball in 2021, Charlotte shifted to the Triple-A East, which was renamed the International League in 2022. The Knights have won two International League championships: in 1993 as the Triple-A affiliate of the Cleveland Indians and again in 1999 as the Triple-A affiliate of the Chicago White Sox.

== History ==
=== Prior professional baseball in Charlotte ===
The first professional baseball team in Charlotte was the Charlotte Hornets, which initially only played a single season in 1892. In 1900, the city was home to the Charlotte Presbyterians. A year later, a new Hornets team formed. The Hornets competed in various leagues for 66 seasons through 1972. In 1937, the Washington Senators, later the Minnesota Twins, purchased the team. The Hornets remained a minor league affiliate of the Senators/Twins for 35 years. In 1940, Calvin Griffith, the son of Senators owner Clark Griffith and future owner of the Senators/Twins, built an approximately 5,000-seat park in Charlotte's Dilworth neighborhood, Clark Griffith Park. It would be the home of Charlotte baseball for the next half-century.

The Hornets spent most of the first half of the 20th century in the low minors (in some years, as low as Class D–equivalent to a Rookie-level team today). However, they were the Senators' second-highest affiliate for much of that time. The Hornets joined the Class A South Atlantic League (SAL) in 1954. They had previously been members of the SAL in the 1920s. The league became a Double-A circuit in 1963 and was reorganized as the Southern League in 1964. In 1972, Charlotte was home to two teams: the Hornets and Minnesota's Class A affiliate in the Western Carolinas League, the Charlotte Twins. After a lackluster season, however, the Twins were moved to Orlando, Florida, as the Orlando Twins. The Hornets also disbanded after the 1972 season, leaving the city without professional baseball.

=== Southern League (1976–1992) ===
In 1976, professional wrestling promoter Jim Crockett Jr. and his family bought the Asheville Orioles, the Double-A affiliate of the Baltimore Orioles. They relocated the club from Asheville, North Carolina, to Charlotte as the Charlotte Orioles. Crockett renovated Griffith Park and renamed it Jim Crockett Memorial Park. Popularly known as the O's, the club joined the Southern League and inherited the Asheville team's status as the Orioles' Double-A affiliate.

The Southern League used a split-season schedule wherein the division winners from each half qualified for the postseason championship playoffs. Charlotte won the First Half Eastern Division title in their inaugural 1976 season, but lost the Eastern Division title to the Orlando Twins in a one-game playoff. The team featured pitcher Dave Ford, who won the Southern League Most Outstanding Pitcher Award, and future Baseball Hall of Famer Eddie Murray at first base. Charlotte won another first half title in 1979 but was again eliminated in the Eastern Division series by the Columbus Astros, 2–0.

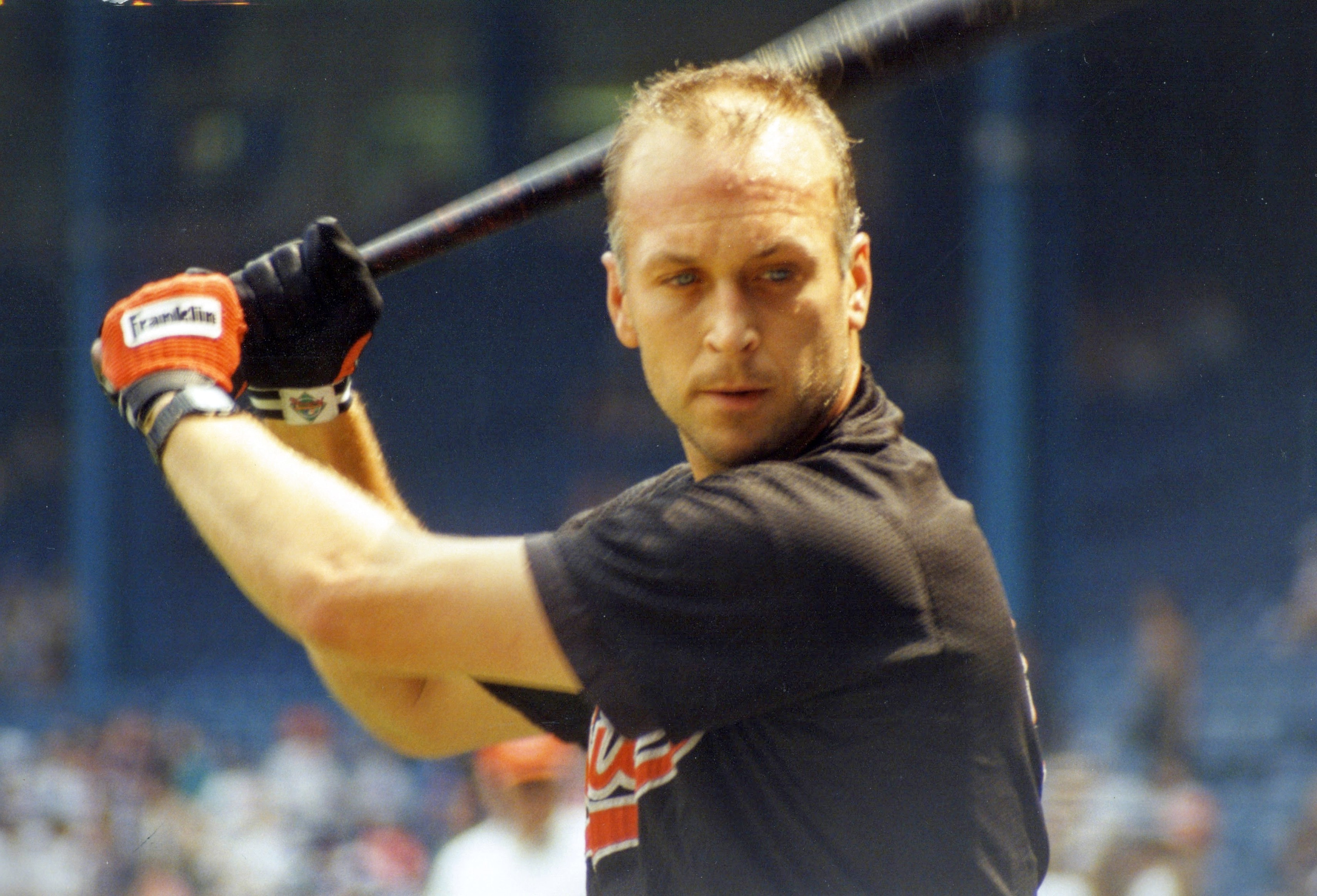
Cal Ripken Jr., inducted in the Baseball Hall of Fame in 2007, played for the Charlotte O's in 1979 and 1980.

Manager Jimmy Williams led the 1980 O's to end the season with an even 72–72 record and the first half title. They then swept the Savannah Braves in a three-game series for the Eastern Division title and defeated the Memphis Chicks, 3–1, to win their first Southern League championship. The 1980 team included future Hall of Famer Cal Ripken Jr. at third base. Four years later, the Orioles returned to the postseason when managers Grady Little and John Hart led them to a 75–72 record and the second half title. They defeated the Greenville Braves, 3–1, for the Eastern Division title before winning their second league championship over the Knoxville Blue Jays, 3–0. Ken Dixon was selected as the league's Most Outstanding Pitcher.

In March 1985, the mostly wood-framed Crockett Park was destroyed by fire. An investigation revealed arson as the cause. The Crockett family built a 3,000-seat makeshift stadium immediately afterwards, which served as the O's home for two years. However, unlike its predecessor, it was completely exposed to the elements, causing a steep decline in attendance. The 1985 O's won a second half title and the Eastern Division over Columbus, 3–1, but lost the Southern League title to the Huntsville Stars, 3–2. Similarly, the 1987 first-half champion O's won the division title versus the Jacksonville Expos, 3–2, but lost the league crown to the Birmingham Barons, 3–1. Third baseman Tom Dodd was selected for the 1987 Southern League Most Valuable Player Award.

Following the 1987 season, George Shinn, founder of the National Basketball Association's Charlotte Hornets, bought the team from the Crockett family and committed to building a permanent ballpark. In 1988, the team was renamed the Charlotte Knights in a naming contest, and Crockett Park was renamed Knights Park. The team's 13-year affiliation with Baltimore ended after the 1988 season.

In 1989, Shinn moved the Knights to Knights Castle, a temporary 8,000-seat stadium located just over the state line in Fort Mill, South Carolina, near the construction site of their permanent home, Knights Stadium. The stadium was built solely for the 1989 season and was demolished following the final game that year to make room for the completion of the 10,000-seat Knights Stadium. Along with a new ballpark, the Knights also had a new major league affiliate in the Chicago Cubs. Laddie Renfroe won the 1989 Southern League Most Outstanding Pitcher Award. Charlotte returned to the playoffs in 1992, but lost the Eastern Division title to Greenville, which had won both halves of the season.

=== International League (1993–2020) ===
In conjunction with the 1993 Major League Baseball expansion, team owner George Shinn was granted an expansion franchise in the Triple-A International League (IL), which would begin playing in Charlotte in 1993. Shinn, who had applied for Charlotte to receive one of two available Triple-A expansion teams, was recommended by the expansion committee after their visit to evaluate the city. Of the nine applicant cities, Charlotte had the newest stadium, the only major league sports franchise (Shinn's Charlotte Hornets), and the largest metro area population. It would be the first time a Carolinas-based team would play at the highest level of minor league baseball.

Gaining a Triple-A team meant Shinn would need to relocate, or sell, his existing Southern League team as the higher classification team held the rights to the territory. He solicited offers to purchase the club to help defray a US$5 million International League enfranchisement cost. Shinn initially sold the Double-A franchise to Tom Benson, owner of the National Football League's New Orleans Saints, who sought to relocate the club to New Orleans. Still, the move was blocked when Minor League Baseball granted territorial rights to the higher-classification Triple-A Denver Zephyrs, who wanted to move to New Orleans after being uprooted by the Colorado Rockies National League expansion team. Benson eventually opted out of the purchase. Without a ballpark for the 1994 season, Larry Schmittou, president and owner of the Triple-A Nashville Sounds, offered Herschel Greer Stadium in Nashville, Tennessee, as a temporary ballpark for the displaced team until Shinn could find a permanent location. So, the team relocated there in 1993 as the Nashville Xpress.

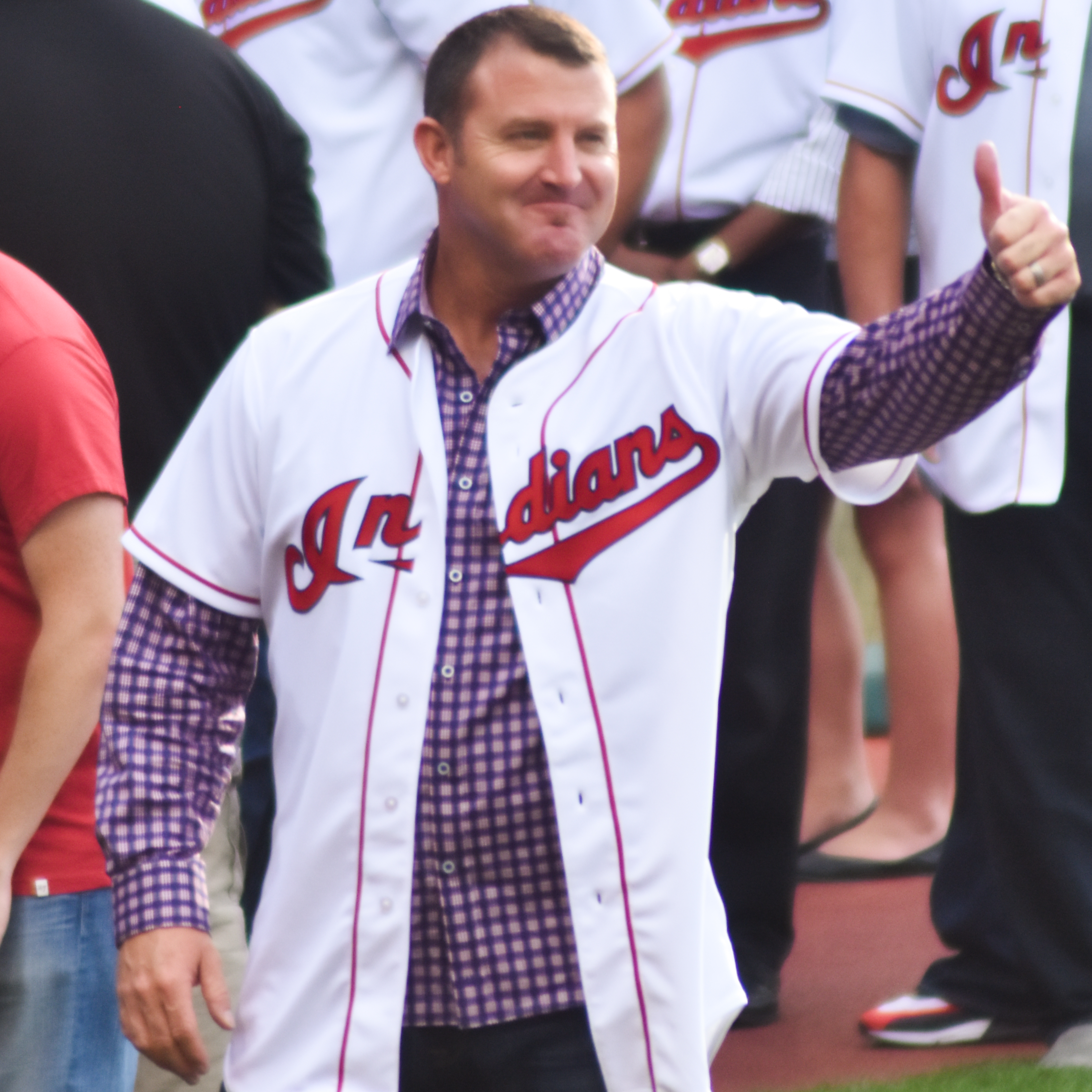
Jim Thome of the 1993 Knights was inducted into the Baseball Hall of Fame in 2018.

The Triple-A Charlotte Knights carried on the history and identity of the preceding Double-A team and became the Triple-A affiliate of the Cleveland Indians. In 1993, Charlie Manuel managed the Knights to win the Western Division title with an 86–55 record. They then defeated the Richmond Braves, 3–1, in the semifinals to advance to the Governors' Cup finals for the International League championship. Charlotte won their first IL championship over the Rochester Red Wings in the best-of-five series, 3–2. Third baseman Jim Thome, later inducted into the Baseball Hall of Fame, won the 1993 International League Most Valuable Player Award with the Knights. The 1994 squad pushed for a second IL title, but lost the semifinals versus Richmond, 3–1. Much of the core of the 1993–94 Knights, including Manuel, would help lead the Indians to the World Series in 1995 and 1997.

In 1995, the Knights switched their affiliation to the Florida Marlins. Over four years with Florida, Charlotte's only postseason appearance occurred in 1997. As in their previous playoff run, they were eliminated in the semifinals by the Columbus Clippers, 3–1. In 1996, left fielder Billy McMillon was selected as the IL Rookie of the Year.

Before the 1997 season, Shinn sold the Knights to North Carolina businessman Don Beaver, who negotiated a Triple-A affiliation with the Chicago White Sox, which began in 1999. Manager Tom Spencer led the Knights to win the IL Wild Card that season with an 82–62 record. In the semifinals, they defeated the Scranton/Wilkes-Barre Red Barons, 3–2, before winning their second IL championship against the Durham Bulls, 3–1. This win earned the team a spot in the Triple-A World Series, a postseason interleague championship series between the league champions of the IL and the Triple-A Pacific Coast League. Charlotte lost the Triple-A World Series versus the Vancouver Canadians, 3–2. Spencer was recognized as the IL Manager of the Year.

Jon Garland, later of the 2005 World Series champion White Sox, won the IL Most Valuable Pitcher Award in 2000 with the Knights. In 2003, second baseman Aaron Miles was the Rookie of the Year. Charlotte next qualified for the Governors' Cup playoffs in 2006, having won the Southern Division title, but lost the semifinals to the Toledo Mud Hens, 3–1. Despite the early postseason exit, a pair of Knights were selected for IL awards. Heath Phillips was the Most Valuable Pitcher, and third baseman Josh Fields was the Rookie of the Year. The club's next playoff appearance came in 2012 after winning another Southern Division title. They defeated the Indianapolis Indians, 3–1, to reach the finals but were swept out of the championship round by the Pawtucket Red Sox in three games.

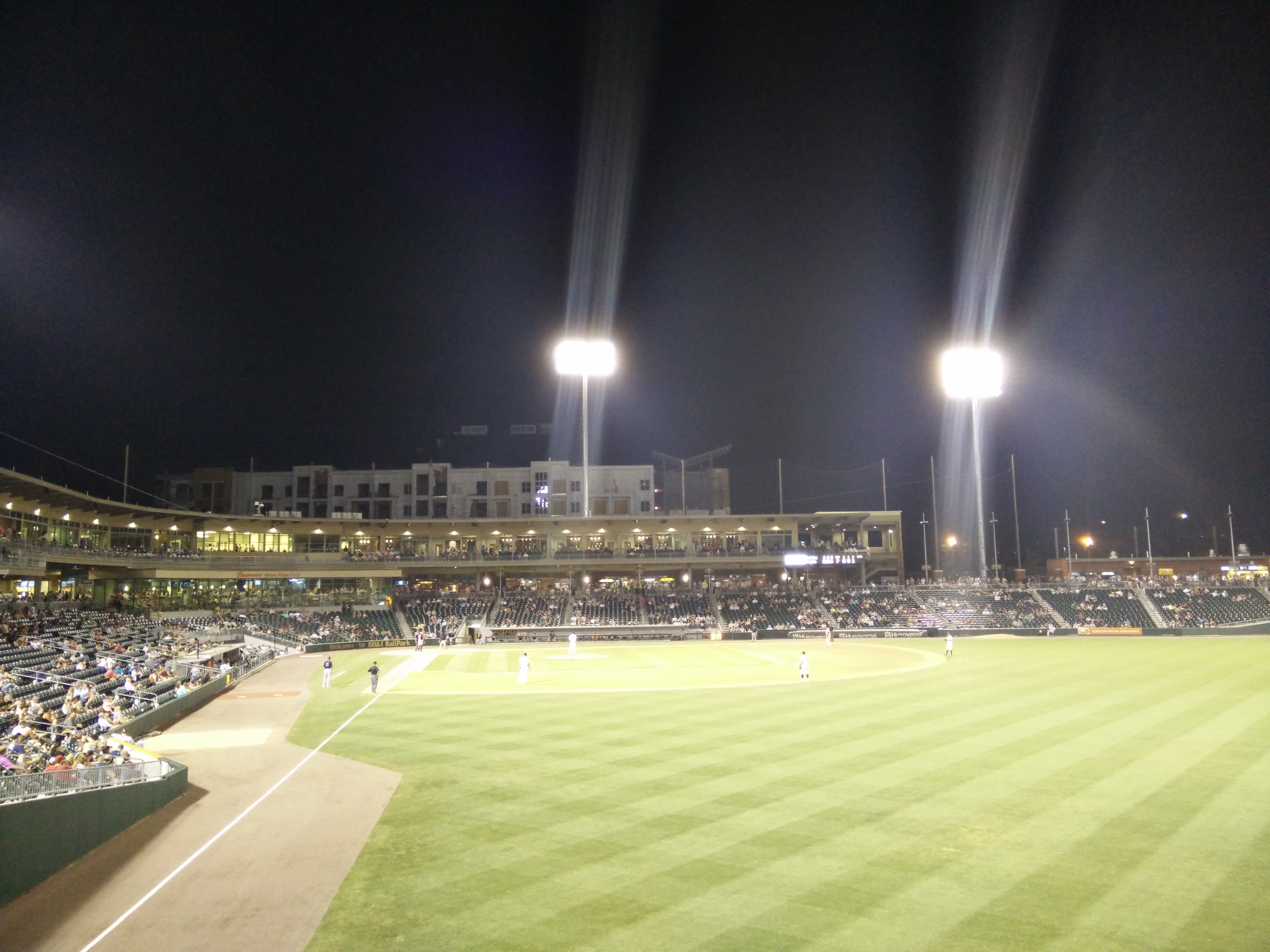
The Knights have played at Truist Field since 2014.

The Knights' attendance sagged after the turn of the millennium, partly because Knights Stadium was almost half an hour south of Charlotte. Many fans were unwilling to brave Interstate 77's infamous congestion to go to the stadium. In 2011, the Charlotte City Council and Mecklenburg County Commission approved a land-swap agreement which opened the door for constructing a new 10,200-seat stadium in downtown Charlotte. The $54 million park, BB&T Ballpark, now Truist Field, opened in time for the 2014 season. It is located one block from Bank of America Stadium, home of the Carolina Panthers. To go along with the move, the Knights dropped the navy blue and dark green color scheme they had been using for the previous 15 years in favor of a new black-gold-silver palette, modeled on the color scheme of the White Sox. They also adopted new logos that focused more on the knight than his horse.

Charlotte hosted the 2016 Triple-A All-Star Game in which a team of International League All-Stars defeated the Pacific Coast League All-Stars, 4–2. The Knights narrowly missed the 2016 playoffs, finishing a half game behind the first-place Gwinnett Stripers. The start of the 2020 season was postponed due to the COVID-19 pandemic before being cancelled on June 30.

=== Triple-A East / International League (2021–present) ===
Following the 2020 season, Major League Baseball assumed control of Minor League Baseball to increase player salaries, modernize facility standards, and reduce travel. The Chicago White Sox retained Charlotte as their Triple-A affiliate, but the International League disbanded, and the Knights followed the other IL teams into the Triple-A East. Charlotte ended the season in seventh place in the Southeastern Division with a 45–75 record. No playoffs were held to determine a league champion, the team with the best regular-season record was declared the winner. However, 10 games postponed from the start of the season were reinserted into the schedule as a postseason tournament called the Triple-A Final Stretch, in which all 30 Triple-A clubs competed for the highest winning percentage. Charlotte finished the tournament in 26th place with a 2–6 record. In 2022, the Triple-A East became known as the International League, the name historically used by the regional circuit before the 2021 reorganization.

Before the 2023 season, the Knights debuted redesigned logos and uniforms. They retained their gold, silver, and black colors with the addition of blue, which is used by the city's other teams, the Carolina Panthers, Charlotte FC, and Charlotte Hornets. The knight's helmet, as was the "C" featured in their cap logo, was redesigned.

== Season-by-season records ==
Key
League	The team's final position in the league standings
Division	The team's final position in the divisional standings
GB	Games behind the team that finished in first place in the division that season
‡	Class champions (1998–present)
†	League champions (1976–present)
*	Division champions (1976–2022)
^	Postseason berth (1976–present)

Season-by-season records
Season	League	Regular-season					Postseason			MLB affiliate	Ref.
Season	League	Record	Win %	League	Division	GB	Record	Win %	Result	MLB affiliate	Ref.
1976^	SL	74–66	.529	3rd	2nd	1 1/2	0–1	.000	Result	Won First-Half Eastern Division title Lost Eastern Division title vs. Orlando Twins, 1–0	Baltimore Orioles
1977	SL	69–71	.493	5th	4th	8 1/2	—	—	—	Baltimore Orioles	
1978	SL	66–78	.458	8th	5th	16 1/2	—	—	—	Baltimore Orioles	
1979^	SL	73–69	.514	5th	2nd	10 1/2	0–2	.000	Won First-Half Eastern Division title Lost Eastern Division title vs. Columbus Astros, 2–0	Baltimore Orioles	
1980^ * †	SL	72–72	.500	5th	3rd	5	6–1	.857	Won First-Half Eastern Division title Won Eastern Division title vs. Savannah Braves, 3–0; Won SL championship vs. Memphis Chicks, 3–1	Baltimore Orioles	
1981	SL	74–69	.517	4th	2nd	5 1/2	—	—	—	Baltimore Orioles	
1982	SL	66–77	.462	9th	5th	16 1/2	—	—	—	Baltimore Orioles	
1983	SL	69–77	.473	6th	3rd	12 1/2	—	—	—	Baltimore Orioles	
1984^ * †	SL	75–72	.510	4th	4th	8	6–1	.857	Won Second-Half Eastern Division title Won Eastern Division title vs. Greenville Braves, 3–1; Won SL championship vs. Knoxville Blue Jays, 3–0	Baltimore Orioles	
1985^ *	SL	78–65	.545	3rd	2nd	1/2	5–4	.556	Won Second-Half Eastern Division title Won Eastern Division title vs. Columbus Astros, 3–1; Lost SL championship vs. Huntsville Stars, 3–2	Baltimore Orioles	
1986	SL	71–73	.493	6th	4th	4 1/2	—	—	—	Baltimore Orioles	
1987^ *	SL	85–60	.586	2nd	2nd	1/2	4–5	.444	Won First-Half Eastern Division title Won Eastern Division title vs. Jacksonville Expos, 3–2; Lost SL championship vs. Birmingham Barons, 3–1	Baltimore Orioles	
1988	SL	69–75	.479	7th	4th	18	—	—	—	Baltimore Orioles	
1989	SL	70–73	.490	6th	4th	8 1/2	—	—	—	Chicago Cubs	
1990	SL	65–79	.451	9th	4th	20	—	—	—	Chicago Cubs	
1991	SL	74–70	.514	5th	4th	14	—	—	—	Chicago Cubs	
1992^	SL	70–73	.490	5th	2nd	30	0–3	.000	Lost Eastern Division title vs. Greenville Braves, 3–0	Chicago Cubs	
1993 * †	IL	86–55	.610	1st	1st	—	6–3	.667	Won Western Division title Won semifinals vs. Richmond Braves, 3–1; Won IL championship vs. Rochester Red Wings, 3–2	Cleveland Indians	
1994^	IL	77–65	.542	3rd	2nd	3 1/2	1–3	.250	Lost semifinals vs. Richmond Braves, 3–1	Cleveland Indians	
1995	IL	59–81	.421	9th	5th	26	—	—	—	Florida Marlins	
1996	IL	62–79	.440	8th (tie)	8th (tie)	22 1/2	—	—	—	Florida Marlins	
1997^	IL	76–65	.539	4th	2nd	2 1/2	1–3	.250	Lost semifinals vs. Columbus Clippers, 3–1	Florida Marlins	
1998	IL	70–73	.490	8th	3rd	9 1/2	—	—	—	Florida Marlins	
1999^ †	IL	82–62	.569	3rd	2nd	1 1/2	8–6	.571	Won wild card berth Won semifinals vs. Scranton/Wilkes-Barre Red Barons, 3–2; Won IL championship vs. Durham Bulls, 3–1; Lost Triple-A World Series vs. Vancouver Canadians, 3–2	Chicago White Sox	
2000	IL	78–65	.545	6th	2nd	3	—	—	—	Chicago White Sox	
2001	IL	67–77	.465	10th	4th	19	—	—	—	Chicago White Sox	
2002	IL	55–88	.385	13th	4th	24 1/2	—	—	—	Chicago White Sox	
2003	IL	74–70	.514	6th	2nd	1	—	—	—	Chicago White Sox	
2004	IL	68–74	.479	9th	4th	11 1/2	—	—	—	Chicago White Sox	
2005	IL	57–87	.396	13th	3rd	22	—	—	—	Chicago White Sox	
2006 *	IL	79–62	.560	2nd	1st	—	1–3	.250	Won Southern Division title Lost semifinals vs. Toledo Mud Hens, 3–1	Chicago White Sox	
2007	IL	63–80	.441	13th	4th	17	—	—	—	Chicago White Sox	
2008	IL	63–78	.447	12th (tie)	3rd (tie)	9 1/2	—	—	—	Chicago White Sox	
2009	IL	67–76	.469	11th	4th	15 1/2	—	—	—	Chicago White Sox	
2010	IL	67–77	.465	10th (tie)	3rd (tie)	21 1/2	—	—	—	Chicago White Sox	
2011	IL	69–74	.483	9th	3rd	11 1/2	—	—	—	Chicago White Sox	
2012 *	IL	83–61	.576	3rd	1st	—	3–4	.429	Won Southern Division title Won semifinals vs. Indianapolis Indians, 3–1; Lost IL championship vs. Pawtucket Red Sox, 3–0	Chicago White Sox	
2013	IL	65–78	.455	12th	3rd	21 1/2	—	—	—	Chicago White Sox	
2014	IL	63–81	.438	14th	4th	12	—	—	—	Chicago White Sox	
2015	IL	74–70	.514	7th (tie)	3rd (tie)	4	—	—	—	Chicago White Sox	
2016	IL	65–79	.451	11th	2nd	1/2	—	—	—	Chicago White Sox	
2017	IL	61–81	.430	12th	4th	25	—	—	—	Chicago White Sox	
2018	IL	64–75	.460	10th	4th	15	—	—	—	Chicago White Sox	
2019	IL	75–64	.540	3rd (tie)	2nd (tie)	5	—	—	—	Chicago White Sox	
2020	IL	Season cancelled (COVID-19 pandemic)								Chicago White Sox	
2021	AAAE	47–81 (Note: In 2021, the team with the best record at the end of the regular-season was declared the Triple-A East champion. Charlotte had a 45–75 (.375) record, 32 games behind first place, which put them 20th in the league and 7th in their division. The regular-season was followed by the Triple-A Final Stretch, a 10-game postseason tournament in which all 30 Triple-A clubs competed for the highest winning percentage. Charlotte finished the tournament in 26th place with a 2–6 (.250) record.)	.367	20th	7th	38	—	—	—	Chicago White Sox	
2022	IL	58–92	.387	20th	10th	28	—	—	—	Chicago White Sox	
2023	IL	53–96	.356	20th	10th	37	—	—	—	Chicago White Sox	
2024	IL	68–79	.463	15th (tie)	8th	20	—	—	—	Chicago White Sox	
2025	IL	65–85	.433	14th	7th	24	—	—	—	Chicago White Sox	
2026	IL	81–68	.544	4th (tie)	2nd (tie)	9 1/2	—	—	—	Chicago White Sox	
Totals	—	3,461–3,697	.484	—	—	—	41–39	.513	—	—	—

== Radio and television ==
Matt Swierad has been the play-by-play announcer for Knights radio broadcasts since 1998. Live audio broadcasts are available online through the team's website and the MiLB First Pitch app. Games can be viewed through the MiLB.TV subscription feature of the official website of Minor League Baseball, with audio provided by a radio simulcast.

== Roster ==
Charlotte Knights roster
Players		Coaches/Other
Pitchers: 46 Nick Altermatt; 33 Aidan Anderson; 15 Adisyn Coffey; 45 Pierce George; 40 Tyler Gilbert *; 41 Jairo Iriarte; 19 Mathias LaCombe; 3 Jordan Morales; 44 Chris Murphy *; 47 Shane Murphy; 18 Peyton Pallette *; 49 Chase Plymell; 17 Joe Rock *; 28 Garrett Schoenle; 31 Jaden Woods	Catchers: 9 Kaleb Freeman; 1 Korey Lee; 12 Michael Turner; Infielders: 5 Mario Camilletti; 45 Tim Elko; 16 Ryan Galanie; 25 Jacob Gonzalez *; 9 Jason Matthews; 7 Riley Unroe; Outfielders: 4 Dru Baker; 20 Jake Cave *; 8 Caden Connor; 2 Andy Weber; 19 Joey Wiemer *	Manager: 29 Chad Pinder; Coaches: 55 Scott Aldred (pitching); 84 Aaron Bray (hitting); 32 Pat Listach (bench); 21 Angel Rosario (catching); -- George Timke (performance); 60-day injured list: 1 William Bergolla Jr.; 32 Tim Elko; 7-day injured list; * On Chicago White Sox 40-man roster; ~ Development list; # Rehab assignment; ∞ Reserve list; ‡ Restricted list; § Suspended list; † Temporarily inactive list; Roster updated September 28, 2026; Transactions; → More rosters: MiLB • International League; → Chicago White Sox minor league players

== Awards ==
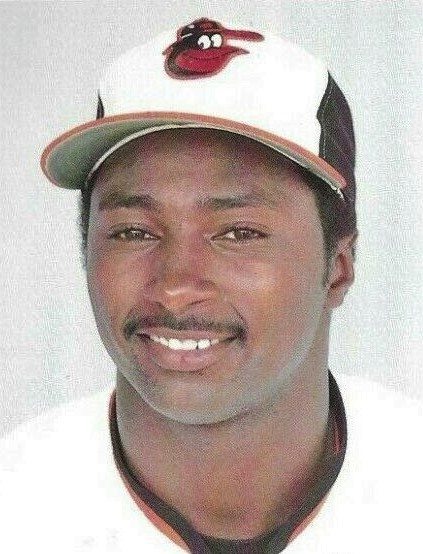
Ken Dixon won the Southern League Most Outstanding Pitcher Award in 1984.

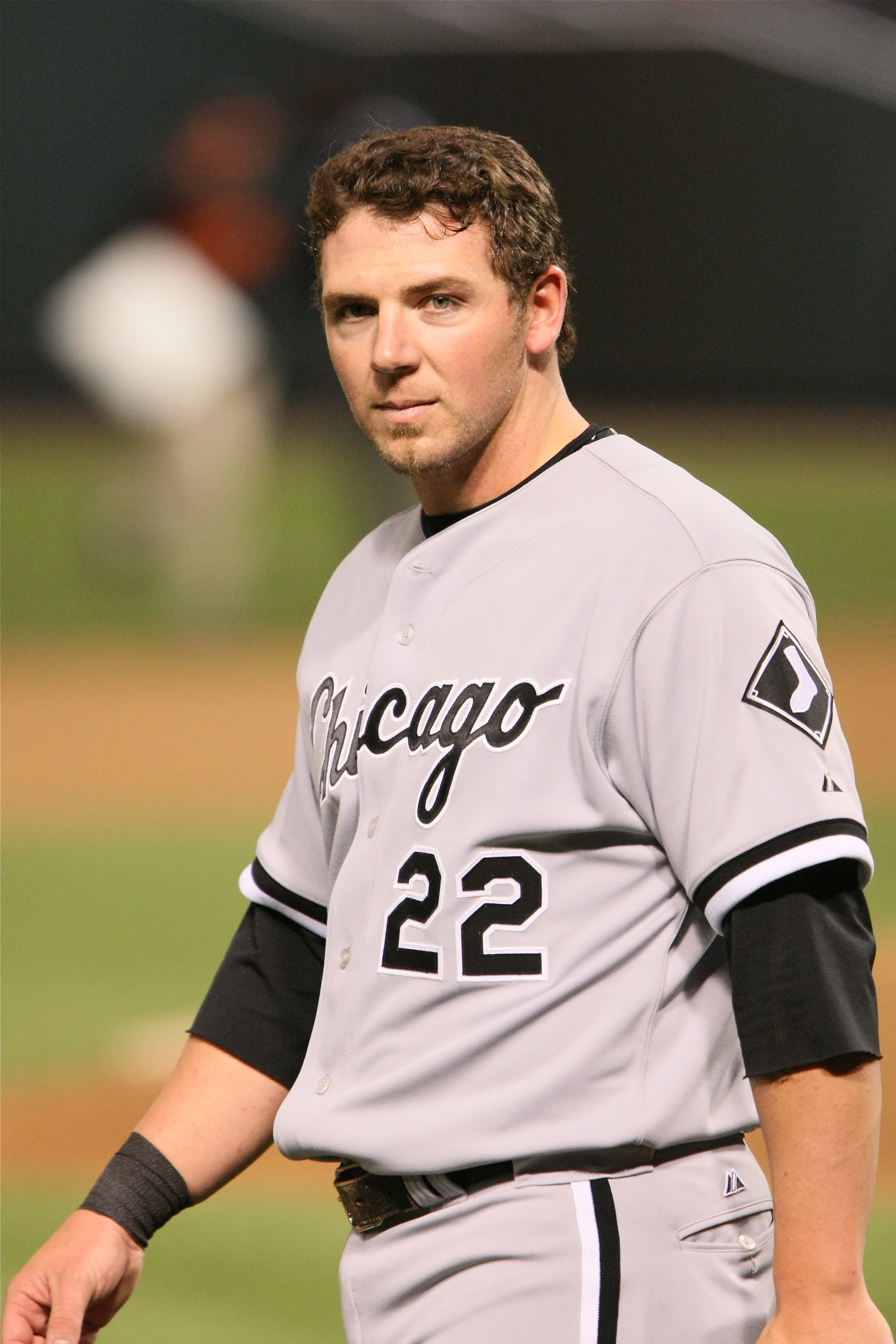
Josh Fields won the International League Rookie of the Year Award in 2006.

Eleven players, one manager, and three executives have won league awards in recognition for their performance with Charlotte.

Southern League Awards
Award	Recipient	Season	Ref.
Most Valuable Player	Tom Dodd	1987	
Most Outstanding Pitcher	Dave Ford	1976	
Most Outstanding Pitcher	Ken Dixon	1984	
Most Outstanding Pitcher	Laddie Renfroe	1989	
Executive of the Year	Frances Crockett	1980	
Executive of the Year	Frances Crockett	1985	
Executive of the Year	Bill Lavelle	1991	

International League Awards
Award	Recipient	Season	Ref.
Most Valuable Player	Jim Thome	1993	
Most Valuable Pitcher	Jon Garland	2000	
Most Valuable Pitcher	Heath Phillips	2006	
Most Valuable Pitcher	Erik Johnson	2015	
Rookie of the Year	Billy McMillon	1996	
Rookie of the Year	Aaron Miles	2003	
Rookie of the Year	Josh Fields	2006	
Manager of the Year	Tom Spencer	1999	
Executive of the Year	Dan Rajkowski	2014	

== Managers ==
Charlotte has had 27 managers since their inaugural 1976 season.

Manager	Season(s)
Jim Schaffer	1976–1977
Lance Nichols	1978
Jimmy Williams	1979–1980
Mark Wiley	1981–1982
Grady Little	1983–1984
John Hart	1984–1985
Greg Biagini	1986–1988
Jim Essian	1989
Tommy Helms	1990
Jay Loviglio	1990–1991
Marv Foley	1992
Charlie Manuel	1993
Brian Graham	1994
Sal Rende	1995–1996
Carlos Tosca	1997
Fredi González	1998
Tom Spencer	1999
Nick Leyva	2000–2005
Manny Trillo	2005
Razor Shines	2006
Marc Bombard	2007–2008
Chris Chambliss	2009–2010
Joe McEwing	2011
Joel Skinner	2012–2015
Julio Vinas	2016
Mark Grudzielanek	2017–2019
Wes Helms	2020–present
