= Tommy Davis (catcher) =

American baseball player (born 1973)

- Catcher
- Born: May 21, 1973; Mobile, Alabama, U.S.
- Died: August 27, 2022 (aged 75); Semmes, AL, U.S.
- Batted: Right Threw: Right

MLB debut
- May 14, 1999, for the Baltimore Orioles

Last MLB appearance
- May 30, 1999, for the Baltimore Orioles

MLB statistics
- Batting average: .167
- Home runs: 0
- Runs batted in: 0
- Stats at Baseball Reference

Teams
- Baltimore Orioles (1999)

Thomas James Davis (born May 21, 1973) is an American former Major League Baseball catcher who played for the Baltimore Orioles in 1999.

== Career ==
Davis attended the University of Southern Mississippi. In 1993, he played collegiate summer baseball with the Wareham Gatemen of the Cape Cod Baseball League and was named a league all-star.

Davis was selected by the Baltimore Orioles in the 2nd round of the 1994 MLB draft. He appeared in five career major league games for Baltimore in 1999.
