= Tanner Hall (baseball) =

American baseball player (born 2002)

Minnesota Twins
- Pitcher
- Born: March 18, 2002 (age 24); Baton Rouge, Louisiana, U.S.
- Bats: Right Throws: Right

Tanner Paul Hall (born March 18, 2002) is an American professional baseball pitcher in the Minnesota Twins organization. He played college baseball for the Southern Miss Golden Eagles, where he was a two-time consensus All-America selection.

== Amateur career ==
Hall grew up in Zachary, Louisiana and attended Zachary High School, where he played baseball and soccer.

Hall made 18 appearances with one start during his freshman season at Southern Miss and went 1-1 with a 5.02 ERA. As a sophomore, he went 9-3 record with a 2.81 ERA and 146 strikeouts against 14 walks over 109 innings pitched. Hall was named the Conference USA Pitcher of the Year and won the C Spire Ferriss Trophy as the top collegiate baseball player in the State of Mississippi. He was also a consensus All-America selection. Hall repeated as a consensus All-American during his junior season after going 12-4 with a 2.48 ERA with 124 strikeouts.

== Professional career ==
Hall was selected by the Minnesota Twins in the fourth round of the 2023 Major League Baseball draft. On July 19, 2023, he signed with the team and received a $510,000 signing bonus.
