= JB Middleton =

American baseball player (born 2003)

Colorado Rockies
- Pitcher
- Born: November 24, 2003 (age 22); Yazoo City, Mississippi, U.S.
- Bats: Right Throws: Right

Jonathan Bailey Middleton (born November 24, 2003) is an American professional baseball pitcher in the Colorado Rockies organization.

== Amateur career ==
Middleton attended Benton Academy in Benton, Mississippi. After graduating in 2022, he enrolled at the University of Southern Mississippi to play college baseball. He played sparingly as a freshman in 2023 but did play in the Cape Cod Baseball League with the Hyannis Harbor Hawks after the season. As a sophomore for Southern Miss in 2024, Middleton appeared in 24 games, mainly in relief, and pitched to a 2-1 record, a 4.34 ERA, and 45 strikeouts over 37 2/3 innings.

For the 2025 season, Middleton moved into the starting rotation. He was awarded the C Spire Ferriss Trophy. Over 16 starts, Middleton went 10–1 with a 2.31 ERA and 122 strikeouts over 105 1/3 innings. After the college season, he participated in the MLB Draft Combine at Chase Field.

== Professional career ==
Middleton was selected by the Colorado Rockies in the second round with the 45th overall pick of the 2025 Major League Baseball draft. He signed with the team for a $2 million dollar signing bonus.

Middleton was named to the Rockies Spring Breakout roster during 2026 spring training. He was assigned to the Single-A Fresno Grizzlies to make his professional debut with whom he made five starts and had a 4.95 ERA with 18 strikeouts across 20 innings. Middleton was placed on the injured list in early May and then underwent internal brace surgery on his right elbow, forcing him to miss the remainder of the season.
