= Tim Elko =

American baseball player (born 1998)

Free agent
- First baseman
- Born: December 27, 1998 (age 27); Wichita, Kansas, U.S.
- Bats: Right Throws: Right

MLB debut
- May 10, 2025, for the Chicago White Sox

MLB statistics (through 2025 season)
- Batting average: .134
- Home runs: 4
- Runs batted in: 8
- Stats at Baseball Reference

Teams
- Chicago White Sox (2025)
Medals
Men's baseball
Representing United States
WBSC Premier12
Bronze medal – third place	2024 Tokyo	Team

Timothy John Elko (born December 27, 1998) is an American professional baseball first baseman who is a free agent. He made his Major League Baseball (MLB) debut in 2025.

== Career ==
Elko attended Hillsborough High School in Tampa, Florida, and the University of Mississippi, where he played college baseball for the Ole Miss Rebels. Elko was a member of the Rebels' 2022 National Championship team. In 2019 and 2020, Elko played collegiate summer baseball for the Fond du Lac Dock Spiders of the Northwoods League.

The Chicago White Sox selected Elko in the tenth round of the 2022 Major League Baseball draft. After signing with the team, he was assigned to the Rookie-level Arizona Complex League White Sox and was later promoted to the Single-A Kannapolis Cannon Ballers. Elko returned to Kannapolis at the beginning of the 2023 season and hit .297 with 17 home runs and 57 RBI in 66 games before earning a promotion to the High-A Winston-Salem Dash. He batted .319 over 31 games with Winston-Salem before being promoted a second time to the Birmingham Barons of the Double-A Southern League. Elko started the 2024 season with Birmingham and was promoted to the Triple–A Charlotte Knights after batting .289 with nine home runs over 91 games.

On May 10, 2025, Elko was selected to the 40-man roster and promoted to the major leagues for the first time. The following day, he hit his first career home run off of Sandy Alcántara of the Miami Marlins. Elko made 23 appearances for the White Sox during his rookie campaign, batting .134/.194/.328 with four home runs, eight RBI, and one stolen base. On October 29, it was announced that Elko would miss at least eight months after undergoing surgery to address a torn ACL in his right knee. On November 21, he was non-tendered by Chicago and became a free agent.

On December 14, 2025, Elko re-signed with the White Sox on a minor league contract. In 39 games between High-A and Triple-A he batted .224/.341/.403 with 6 home runs, 17 RBIs and one stolen base. He elected free agency on November 2.
