= 2022 North Carolina Tar Heels baseball team =

American college baseball season

2022 North Carolina Tar Heels baseball

ACC tournament champions NCAA Chapel Hill Regional champions

NCAA Chapel Hill Super Regional, 0–2
- Conference: Atlantic Coast Conference

Ranking
- Coaches: No. 15
- CB: No. 14
- Record: 42–22 (15–15 ACC)
- Head coach: Scott Forbes (2nd season)
- Assistant coaches: Bryant Gaines (12th season); Jesse Wierzbicki (6th season); Jason Howell (2nd season)
- Home stadium: Boshamer Stadium

2022 Atlantic Coast Conference baseball standings
	Conf.						Overall
Team	W		L		T	PCT	W		L		T	PCT
Atlantic
No. 12 Louisville ^{x}‍‍‍^{y}	18	–	11	–	1	.617	42	–	21	–	1	.664
No. 6 Notre Dame ‍‍‍^{y}	16	–	11	–	0	.593	41	–	17	–	0	.707
Wake Forest ‍‍‍^{y}	15	–	14	–	1	.517	41	–	19	–	1	.680
Florida State ‍‍‍^{y}	15	–	15	–	0	.500	34	–	25	–	0	.576
NC State ‍‍‍	14	–	15	–	0	.483	36	–	21	–	0	.632
Clemson ‍‍‍	13	–	16	–	0	.448	35	–	23	–	0	.603
Boston College ‍‍‍	5	–	25	–	0	.167	19	–	34	–	0	.358
Coastal
No. 11 Virginia Tech ^{x}‍‍‍^{y}	19	–	9	–	0	.679	45	–	14	–	0	.763
No. 20 Miami (FL) ‍‍‍^{y}	20	–	10	–	0	.667	40	–	19	–	0	.678
Virginia ‍‍‍^{y}	17	–	13	–	0	.567	39	–	19	–	0	.672
No. 14 North Carolina ‍‍‡‍^{y}	15	–	15	–	0	.500	42	–	22	–	0	.656
Georgia Tech ‍‍‍^{y}	15	–	15	–	0	.500	36	–	24	–	0	.600
Pittsburgh ‍‍‍	13	–	16	–	0	.448	29	–	27	–	0	.518
Duke ‍‍‍	10	–	20	–	0	.333	22	–	32	–	0	.407
x – Division champion ‡ – Tournament champion y – Invited to the NCAA tournament As of June 27, 2022; Rankings from D1Baseball

The 2022 North Carolina Tar Heels baseball team represented the University of North Carolina at Chapel Hill in the 2022 NCAA Division I baseball season. The Tar Heels played their home games at Boshamer Stadium as a member of the Atlantic Coast Conference. They were led by head coach Scott Forbes, in his second season as head coach.

== Previous season ==
The 2021 Tar Heels finished the season with a 28–27 (18–18) record. They tied for 3rd place in the ACC's Coastal Division, and made the NCAA tournament's Lubbock Regional, where they upset UCLA in the first game before losing to hosts Texas Tech, and the Bruins, to be eliminated.

== Personnel ==
=== Roster ===
2022 North Carolina Tar Heels roster
Pitchers: 15 - Gage Gillian - Senior; 24 - Shaddon Peavyhouse - Graduate; 26 - Kyle Mott - Junior; 27 - Connor Bovair - Sophomore; 29 - Nick James - Sophomore; 31 - Alden Segui - Freshman; 34 - Caden O'Brien - Senior; 35 - Max Carlson - Sophomore; 36 - Nik Pry - Junior; 38 - Davis Palermo - Sophomore; 39 - Brandon Schaeffer - Junior; 41 - Will Sandy - Sophomore; 42 - Owen Flynn - Freshman; 43 - Shawn Rapp - Sophomore; 44 - Carson Starnes - Freshman; 46 - Caleb Cozart - (redshirt) Sophomore; 47 - Nick Argento - Freshman; 48 - Connor Ollio - Junior; 49 - Dalton Pence - Freshman; 51 - Tanner Quick - Sophomore	Catchers: 5 - Eric Grintz - Sophomore; 28 - Dylan King - Freshman; 52 - Tomas Frick - Sophomore; 54 - Max Riemer - (redshirt) Junior; Infielders: 1 - Danny Serretti - Junior; 2 - Mikey Madej - Senior; 3 - Colby Wilkerson - Sophomore; 10 - Mac Horvath - Sophomore; 18 - Clemente Inclan - Senior; 19 - Johnny Castagnozzi - Sophomore; 20 - Alex Ritzer - Freshman; 23 - Alberto Osuna - Sophomore	Outfielders: 6 - Tyler Causey - Sophomore; 11 - Reece Holbrook - Freshman; 40 - Angel Zarate - (redshirt) Junior; Utility: 7 - Vance Honeycutt (INF/OF) - Freshman; 8 - Patrick Alvarez (INF/OF) - Sophomore; 12 - Will Stewart (OF/C) - Sophomore; 14 - Justin Szestowicki (INF/P) - Freshman; 16 - Casey Cook (INF/OF) - Freshman; 17 - Joe Jaconski (INF/OF) - Freshman; 25 - Brandon Eike (INF/P) - Sophomore; 45 - Hunter Stokely (INF/OF) - Sophomore

=== Coaching staff ===
2022 North Carolina Tar Heels coaching staff
Name	Position	Seasons	Alma mater
Scott Forbes	Head coach	2	NC Wesleyan (1998)
Bryant Gaines	Assistant Head Coach/Recruiting Coordinator	12	North Carolina (2011)
Jesse Wierzbicki	Assistant Coach	6	North Carolina (2011)
Jason Howell	Assistant Coach	2	North Carolina (2002)
Dave Arendas	Director of Baseball Operations	17	North Carolina (1990)

== Schedule and results ==
Legend
	Tar Heel win
	Tar Heel loss
	Postponement
**Bold**	North Carolina team member
*	Non-Conference game
†	Make-Up Game

2022 North Carolina Tar Heels baseball game log
Regular season
February (6–1)

Date	Opponent	Rank	Site/stadium	Score	Win	Loss	Save	Attendance	Overall record	ACC record
February 18	Seton Hall*		Boshamer Stadium • Chapel Hill, NC	**W** 14–3	**Schaeffer** (1–0)	Payero (0–1)	None	2,155	1–0	–
February 19	Seton Hall*		Boshamer Stadium • Chapel Hill, NC	**W** 19–0	**Palermo** (1–0)	Waldis (0–1)	None	2,042	2–0	–
February 20	Seton Hall*		Boshamer Stadium • Chapel Hill, NC	**W** 7–3	**Rapp** (1–0)	O'Neill (0–1)	None	1,950	3–0	–
February 22	Elon*		Boshamer Stadium • Chapel Hill, NC	**W** 5–1	**Bovair** (1–0)	Evans (0–1)	None	1,597	4–0	–
February 25	No. 25 ECU*		Boshamer Stadium • Chapel Hill, NC	**W** 7–4	**Schaeffer** (2–0)	Saylor (0–2)	**O'Brien** (1)	2,939	5–0	–
February 26	No. 25 ECU*		Boshamer Stadium • Chapel Hill, NC	**W** 2–0	**Carlson** (1–0)	Kuchmaner (0–1)	**O'Brien** (2)	2,831	6–0	–
February 27	at No. 25 ECU*		Clark–LeClair Stadium • Greenville, NC	**L** 0–5	Spivey (1–0)	**Peavyhouse** (0–1)	Brooks (1)	3,795	6–1	–

March (13–5)

Date	Opponent	Rank	Site/stadium	Score	Win	Loss	Save	Attendance	Overall record	ACC record
March 1	Longwood*	No. 24	Boshamer Stadium • Chapel Hill, NC	**W** 16–1	**Mott** (1–0)	Melnyk (0–1)	None	1,692	7–1	–
March 2	Winthrop*	No. 24	Boshamer Stadium • Chapel Hill, NC	**W** 7–3	**Pry** (1–0)	Mims (0–1)	None	1,929	8–1	–
March 4	Coastal Carolina*	No. 24	Boshamer Stadium • Chapel Hill, NC	**W** 4–3	**Mott** (2–0)	Billings (0–2)	None	2,861	9–1	–
March 5	Coastal Carolina*	No. 24	Boshamer Stadium • Chapel Hill, NC	**W** 4–0	**Gillian** (1–0)	VanScoter (1–1)	None	2,572	10–1	–
March 6	Coastal Carolina*	No. 24	Boshamer Stadium • Chapel Hill, NC	**W** 4–3	**Ollio** (1–0)	Barrow (0–1)	None	2,651	11–1	–
March 8	at No. 14 Liberty*	No. 15	Liberty Baseball Stadium • Lynchburg, VA	**L** 0–1	Fluharty (1–0)	**Bovair** (1–1)	Hungate (4)	2,692	11–2	–
March 9	Georgetown*	No. 15	Boshamer Stadium • Chapel Hill, NC	postponed	–	–	–	–	–	–
March 11	Pittsburgh	No. 15	Boshamer Stadium • Chapel Hill, NC	**W** 7–4	**Mott** (3–0)	Gilbertson (1–2)	**O'Brien** (3)	–	12–2	1–0
March 12	Pittsburgh	No. 15	Boshamer Stadium • Chapel Hill, NC	**W** 4–3	**Peavyhouse** (1–1)	Summers (1–1)	None	1,645	13–2	2–0
March 13	Pittsburgh	No. 15	Boshamer Stadium • Chapel Hill, NC	**W** 9–2	**Mott** (4–0)	Stuart (1–2)	**Rapp** (1)	1,637	14–2	3–0
March 15	VMI*	No. 15	Boshamer Stadium • Chapel Hill, NC	**W** 5–1	**Peavyhouse** (2–1)	Lloyd (1–2)	**Palermo** (1)	1,499	15–2	3–0
March 16	Richmond*	No. 15	Boshamer Stadium • Chapel Hill, NC	postponed	–	–	–	–	–	–
March 18	at Duke	No. 15	Durham Bulls Athletic Park • Durham, NC	**W** 10–5	**Mott** (5–0)	Johnson (1–4)	None	1,507	16–2	4–0
March 19	at Duke	No. 15	Durham Bulls Athletic Park • Durham, NC	**L** 3–9	Allen (1–1)	**Peavyhouse** (2–2)	None	2,780	16–3	4–1
March 20	at Duke	No. 15	Durham Bulls Athletic Park • Durham, NC	**W** 4–1	**Bovair** (2–1)	Seidl 1–1	**O'Brien** (4)	2,186	17–3	5–1
March 22	Appalachian State*	No. 13	Boshamer Stadium • Chapel Hill, NC	**W** 4–2	**O'Brien** (1–0)	Ellington (0–2)	None	2,614	18–3	5–1
March 25	at Miami (FL)	No. 13	Alex Rodriguez Park at Mark Light Field • Coral Gables, FL	**L** 5–8	Palmquist (5–1)	**Schaeffer** (2–1)	Walters (6)	3,172	18–4	5–2
March 26	at Miami (FL)	No. 13	Alex Rodriguez Park at Mark Light Field • Coral Gables, FL	**L** 3–7	Torres (2–0)	**Mott** (5–1)	None	3,193	18–5	5–3
March 27	at Miami (FL)	No. 13	Alex Rodriguez Park at Mark Light Field • Coral Gables, FL	**L** 2–3 (14)	Arguelles (1–1)	**Gillian** (1–1)	None	2,885	18–6	5–4
March 29	UNCW*	No. 18	Boshamer Stadium • Chapel Hill, NC	**W** 6–4	**Peavyhouse** (3–2)	Overton (0–1)	**Mott** (1)	1,891	19–6	5–4

April (5–11)

Date	Opponent	Rank	Site/stadium	Score	Win	Loss	Save	Attendance	Overall record	ACC record
April 1	Virginia Tech	No. 18	Boshamer Stadium • Chapel Hill, NC	**L** 1–12	Green (2–2)	**Bovair** (2–2)	None	2,601	19–7	5–5
April 2	Virginia Tech	No. 18	Boshamer Stadium • Chapel Hill, NC	**L** 3–7	Hackenberg (5–0)	**Carlson** (1–1)	None	2,745	19–8	5–6
April 3	Virginia Tech	No. 18	Boshamer Stadium • Chapel Hill, NC	**W** 10–6	**Rapp** (2–0)	Kennedy (1–3)	**Schaeffer** (1)	2,474	20–8	6–6
April 6	vs. South Carolina*	No. 22	Truist Field • Charlotte, NC	**L** 2–15	Hunter (5–2)	**Gillian** (1–2)	None	3,456	20–9	6–6
April 8	at Louisville	No. 22	Jim Patterson Stadium • Louisville, KY	**W** 13–9	**Mott** (6–1)	Kuehner (4–2)	None	2,162	21–9	7–6
April 9	at Louisville	No. 22	Jim Patterson Stadium • Louisville, KY	**L** 8–9 (10)	Prosecky (2–0)	**Palermo** (1–1)	None	2,102	21–10	7–7
April 10	at Louisville	No. 22	Jim Patterson Stadium • Louisville, KY	**L** 5–6 (14)	Wiegman (1–0)	**Ollio** (1–1)	None	2,103	21–11	7–8
April 12	NC A&T*		Boshamer Stadium • Chapel Hill, NC	**L** 6–7	Thomas (1–0)	**Peavyhouse** (3–3)	Winebarger (1)	1,942	21–12	7–8
April 15	Georgia Tech		Boshamer Stadium • Chapel Hill, NC	**L** 12–15	Maxwell (3–0)	**Mott** (6–2)	Brown (4)	2,861	21–13	7–9
April 16	Georgia Tech		Boshamer Stadium • Chapel Hill, NC	**W** 10–5	**Schaeffer** (3–1)	McGuire (2–2)	None	2,636	22–13	8–9
April 17	Georgia Tech		Boshamer Stadium • Chapel Hill, NC	**L** 8–11	Brown (2–0)	**Bovair** (2–3)	Medich (1)	2,028	22–14	8–10
April 19	Campbell*		Boshamer Stadium • Chapel Hill, NC	**W** 7–4	**Bovair** (3–3)	Kuehler (1–5)	**Palermo** (2)	2,053	23–14	8–10
April 22	at No. 11 Virginia		Davenport Field • Charlottesville, VA	**L** 2–4	Woolfolk (3–0)	**Carlson** (1–2)	Neeck (1)	4,078	23–15	8–11
April 23	at No. 11 Virginia		Davenport Field • Charlottesville, VA	**L** 7–11 (10)	Kosanovich (2–0)	**Gillian** (1–3)	None	4,712	23–16	8–12
April 24	at No. 11 Virginia		Davenport Field • Charlottesville, VA	**L** 3–10	Berry (5–2)	**Mott** (6–3)	None	4,559	23–17	8–13
April 27	Liberty*		Boshamer Stadium • Chapel Hill, NC	**W** 8–1	**Schaeffer** (4–1)	Gibson (3–4)	None	2,004	24–17	8–13

May (10–2)

Date	Opponent	Rank	Site/stadium	Score	Win	Loss	Save	Attendance	Overall record	ACC record
May 3	Charlotte*		Boshamer Stadium • Chapel Hill, NC	**W** 4–3 (10)	**Bovair** (4–3)	Kramer (2–1)	None	1,876	25–17	8–13
May 6	at NC State		Doak Field • Raleigh, NC	**W** 8–7	**Gillian** (2–3)	Lawson (4–2)	None	3,048	26–17	9–13
May 8	at NC State		Doak Field • Raleigh, NC	**L** 2–9	Willadsen (3–3)	**Schaeffer** (4–2)	None	3,048	26–18	9–14
May 8	at NC State		Doak Field • Raleigh, NC	**W** 7–6	**Bovair** (5–3)	Villaman (3–3)	**Palermo** (3)	2,744	27–18	10–14
May 10	Gardner-Webb*		Boshamer Stadium • Chapel Hill, NC	**W** 12–5	**O'Brien** (2–0)	Pilla (0–2)	None	1,821	28–18	10–14
May 11	Charleston Southern*		Boshamer Stadium • Chapel Hill, NC	**W** 12–1	**Sandy** (1–0)	Candelas (0–1)	None	1,826	29–18	10–14
May 13	Wake Forest		Boshamer Stadium • Chapel Hill, NC	**W** 3–0	**Rapp** (3–0)	Lowder (9–3)	**Palermo** (4)	1,680	30–18	11–14
May 14	Wake Forest		Boshamer Stadium • Chapel Hill, NC	**W** 12–3	**Schaeffer** (5–2)	Hartle (5–6)	None	1,969	31–18	12–14
May 15	Wake Forest		Boshamer Stadium • Chapel Hill, NC	**L** 2–11	McGraw (4–2)	**Bovair** (5–4)	None	2,314	31–19	12–15
May 17	at UNCW*		Boshamer Stadium • Chapel Hill, NC	Canceled						
May 19	No. 20 Florida State		Boshamer Stadium • Chapel Hill, NC	**W** 7–5	**Palermo** (2–1)	Crowell (5–1)	None	2,235	32–19	13–15
May 20	No. 20 Florida State		Boshamer Stadium • Chapel Hill, NC	**W** 10–4	**Schaeffer** (6–2)	Messick (6–4)	None	2,777	33–19	14–15
May 21	No. 20 Florida State		Boshamer Stadium • Chapel Hill, NC	**W** 11–0	**Pry** (2–0)	Hubbart (8–2)	None	2,486	34–19	15–15

Postseason
ACC Tournament (4–0)

Date	Opponent	Rank	Site/stadium	Score	Win	Loss	Save	Attendance	Overall record	ACCT record
May 24	vs. (12) Clemson	(8)	Truist Field • Charlotte, NC	**W** 9–2	**Carlson** (2–2)	Anglin (6–6)	None	3,582	35–19	1–0
May 27	vs. No. 2 (1) Virginia Tech	(8)	Truist Field • Charlotte, NC	**W** 10–0	**Schaeffer** (7–2)	Hackenberg (10–2)	None	7,117	36–19	2–0
May 28	vs. No. 16 (4) Notre Dame	(8)	Truist Field • Charlotte, NC	**W** 7–2	**Rapp** (4–0)	Tyrell (5–1)	**Palermo** (5)	4,912	37–19	3–0
May 29	vs. (10) NC State	(8)	Truist Field • Charlotte, NC	**W** 9–5	**Carlson** (3–2)	Whitaker (2–4)	None	10,500	38–19	4–0

Chapel Hill Regional (4–1)

Date	Opponent	Rank	Site/stadium	Score	Win	Loss	Save	Attendance	Overall record	Regional record
June 3	vs. (4) Hofstra	No. 10 (1)	Boshamer Stadium • Chapel Hill, NC	**W** 15–4	**Carlson** (4–2)	Camarda (8–2)	None	3,551	39–19	1–0
June 4	vs. (3) VCU	No. 10 (1)	Boshamer Stadium • Chapel Hill, NC	**L** 3–4	Ellis (5–4)	**Schaeffer** (7–3)	Wilson (3)	3,843	39–20	1–1
June 5	vs. (2) Georgia	No. 10 (1)	Boshamer Stadium • Chapel Hill, NC	**W** 6–5	**Pry** (3–0)	Wagner (5–2)	**O'Brien** (5)	3,321	40–20	2–1
June 5	vs. (3) VCU	No. 10 (1)	Boshamer Stadium • Chapel Hill, NC	**W** 19–8	**O'Brien** (3–0)	Furman (6–1)	**Bovair** (1)	3,626	41–20	3–1
June 6	vs. (3) VCU	No. 10 (1)	Boshamer Stadium • Chapel Hill, NC	**W** 7–3	**Gillian** (3–3)	Davis (5–3)	None	4,160	42–20	4–1

Chapel Hill Super Regional (0–2)

Date	Opponent	Rank	Site/stadium	Score	Win	Loss	Save	Attendance	Overall record	Series record
June 11	vs. Arkansas	No. 10	Boshamer Stadium • Chapel Hill, NC	**L** 1–4	Noland (7–5)	**Carlson** (4–3)	Smith (2)	3,794	42–21	0–1
June 12	vs. Arkansas	No. 10	Boshamer Stadium • Chapel Hill, NC	**L** 3–4	Morris (6–0)	**O'Brien** (3–1)	None	3,831	42–22	0–2

All rankings from D1Baseball except for Super Regional and College World Series where national seeds are used instead.

=== Chapel Hill Super Regional ===
Regional	Regional
1	**Oklahoma State**	**10**
4	Missouri State	5
1	Oklahoma State	12
2	**Arkansas**	**20**
3	Grand Canyon	1
2	**Arkansas**	**7**
Stillwater Regional – O'Brate Stadium
4	**Missouri State**	**8**
3	Grand Canyon	7
4	Missouri State	15
1	**Oklahoma State**	**29**
1	**North Carolina**	**15**
4	Hofstra	4
1	North Carolina	3
3	**VCU**	**4**
3	**VCU**	**8**
2	Georgia	1
Chapel Hill Regional – Boshamer Stadium
4	Hofstra	1
2	**Georgia**	**24**
2	Georgia	5
1	**North Carolina**	**6**

Regional Final
2	**Arkansas**	10^{10}	**7**
1	Oklahoma State	**14**	3
3	VCU	8	3
1	**North Carolina**	**19**	**7**

Super Regional
**Arkansas**	**4**	**4**	–
10	North Carolina	1	3	–

== Rankings ==
Ranking movements Legend: ██ Increase in ranking ██ Decrease in ranking — = Not ranked RV = Received votes
	Week																		
Poll	Pre	1	2	3	4	5	6	7	8	9	10	11	12	13	14	15	16	17	Final
Coaches'	RV	RV*	24	18	18	12	18	20	RV	RV	RV	RV	—	—	RV	16	16*	16*	15
Baseball America	—	—	—	20	19	14	15	20	—	—	—	—	—	—	—	12	12*	12*	13
Collegiate Baseball^	25	26	21	14	11	6	14	22	—	—	—	—	—	—	—	18	11	14	14
NCBWA†	—	—	27	20	15	13	18	21	RV	—	—	—	—	—	RV	25	15	15*	15
D1Baseball	—	—	24	15	15	13	18	22	—	—	—	—	—	—	—	11	11*	11*	14

^ Collegiate Baseball ranked 40 teams in their preseason poll, but only ranked 30 teams weekly during the season.
† NCBWA ranks 30 teams in their preseason poll, but only ranks 25 teams weekly during the season.
* A new poll was not released for this week, so for comparison purposes, the previous week's ranking is inserted in this week's slot.
