= 2022 Atlantic Coast Conference baseball tournament =

American college baseball tournament

- Teams: 12
- Format: See below
- Finals site: Truist Field; Charlotte, NC
- Champions: North Carolina (8th title)
- Winning coach: Scott Forbes (1st title)
- MVP: Vance Honeycutt (North Carolina)
- Attendance: 49,643
- Television: ACC RSN's (Tues-Sat); ACC Network (Semifinals); ESPN2 (Championship)

2022 Atlantic Coast Conference baseball standings
	Conf.						Overall
Team	W		L		T	PCT	W		L		T	PCT
Atlantic
No. 12 Louisville ^{x}‍‍‍^{y}	18	–	11	–	1	.617	42	–	21	–	1	.664
No. 6 Notre Dame ‍‍‍^{y}	16	–	11	–	0	.593	41	–	17	–	0	.707
Wake Forest ‍‍‍^{y}	15	–	14	–	1	.517	41	–	19	–	1	.680
Florida State ‍‍‍^{y}	15	–	15	–	0	.500	34	–	25	–	0	.576
NC State ‍‍‍	14	–	15	–	0	.483	36	–	21	–	0	.632
Clemson ‍‍‍	13	–	16	–	0	.448	35	–	23	–	0	.603
Boston College ‍‍‍	5	–	25	–	0	.167	19	–	34	–	0	.358
Coastal
No. 11 Virginia Tech ^{x}‍‍‍^{y}	19	–	9	–	0	.679	45	–	14	–	0	.763
No. 20 Miami (FL) ‍‍‍^{y}	20	–	10	–	0	.667	40	–	19	–	0	.678
Virginia ‍‍‍^{y}	17	–	13	–	0	.567	39	–	19	–	0	.672
No. 14 North Carolina ‍‍‡‍^{y}	15	–	15	–	0	.500	42	–	22	–	0	.656
Georgia Tech ‍‍‍^{y}	15	–	15	–	0	.500	36	–	24	–	0	.600
Pittsburgh ‍‍‍	13	–	16	–	0	.448	29	–	27	–	0	.518
Duke ‍‍‍	10	–	20	–	0	.333	22	–	32	–	0	.407
x – Division champion ‡ – Tournament champion y – Invited to the NCAA tournament As of June 27, 2022; Rankings from D1Baseball

The 2022 Atlantic Coast Conference baseball tournament was held from May 24 through 29 at Truist Field in Charlotte, North Carolina. The annual tournament determined the conference champion of the Division I Atlantic Coast Conference for college baseball. The tournament champion, the North Carolina Tar Heels, received the league's automatic bid to the 2022 NCAA Division I baseball tournament.

The tournament has been held every year but two since 1973, with Clemson winning ten championships, the most all-time. Georgia Tech has won nine championships, and Florida State has won eight titles since their entry to the league in 1992. Recent entrants Virginia Tech, Boston College, Pittsburgh, Notre Dame and Louisville have never won the event.

== Format and seeding ==
The winner of each seven team division and the top ten other teams based on conference winning percentage, regardless of division, from the conference's regular season were seeded one through twelve. Seeds one and two were awarded to the two division winners. Teams were then divided into four pools of three teams each, with the winners advancing to single elimination bracket for the championship.

If a 1–1 tie were to occur among all three teams in a pool, the highest seeded team would have advanced to the semifinals. Because of this, seeds 5–12 must win both pool play games to advance to the single-elimination bracket, and seeds 1–4 must only win the game against the winner of the game between the other two teams in the pool to advance. For example, if the 12 seed beats the 8 seed in the first game, then the winner of the 12 seed versus 1 seed advances, and the 8 seed versus 1 seed game has no effect on which team advances.

The seeds were announced on May 21, after the final day of conference play.

Team	W–L	Pct	GB #1	Seed
Atlantic Division
Louisville	18–11–1	.617	1.5	2
Notre Dame	16–11	.593	2.5	4
Wake Forest	15–14–1	.517	4.5	6
Florida State	15–15	.500	5	9
NC State	14–15	.483	5.5	10
Clemson	13–16	.448	6.5	12
Boston College	5–25	.167	15	—

Team	W–L	Pct	GB #1	Seed
Coastal Division
Virginia Tech	19–9	.679	–	1
Miami	20–10	.667	–	3
Virginia	17–13	.567	3	5
Georgia Tech	15–15	.500	5	7
North Carolina	15–15	.500	5	8
Pittsburgh	13–16	.448	6.5	11
Duke	10–20	.333	10	—

Tiebreakers
Teams	Record	Tiebreaker 1	Tiebreaker 2
(7) Georgia Tech (8) North Carolina (9) Florida State	15–15; 15–15; 15–15	GT 4–2; UNC 4–2; FSU 1–5	GT 2–1; UNC 1–2 —
(11) Pittsburgh (12) Clemson	13–16; 13–16	PITT 2–0; CLEM 0–2	

- Two-way tie broken by combined head-to-head records.
- Three-way tie broken by combined head-to-head records.
- If a tie remains after the first tiebreaker, the two-way tiebreaker is used.

== Schedule and results ==
=== Schedule ===
Game	Time*	Matchup^{#}	Score	Television	Attendance	Reference
Tuesday, May 24
1	11:00 a.m.	No. 11 Pittsburgh vs. No 7 Georgia Tech	12–6	ACCRSN	1,895	
2	3:00 p.m.	No. 10 NC State vs. No. 6 Wake Forest	11–8	ACCRSN	1,895	
3	7:00 p.m.	No. 12 Clemson vs. No. 8 North Carolina	2–9	ACCRSN	3,582	
Wednesday, May 25
4	11:00 a.m.	No. 2 Louisville vs. No. 11 Pittsburgh	5–6	ACCRSN	2,141	
5	3:00 p.m.	No. 9 Florida State vs. No. 5 Virginia	13–3^{8}	ACCRSN	2,141	
6	7:00 p.m.	No. 3 Miami (FL) vs. No. 10 NC State	6–9	ACCRSN	3,579	
Thursday, May 26
7	11:00 a.m.	No. 7 Georgia Tech vs. No. 2 Louisville	9–4	ACCRSN	1,989	
8	3:00 p.m.	No. 4 Notre Dame vs. No. 9 Florida State	5–3	ACCRSN	1,989	
9	7:00 p.m.	No. 1 Virginia Tech vs. No. 12 Clemson	18–6	ACCRSN	3,049	
Friday, May 27
10	11:00 a.m.	No. 5 Virginia vs. No. 4 Notre Dame	0–3	ACCRSN	2,519	
11	3:00 p.m.	No. 6 Wake Forest vs. No. 3 Miami (FL)	16–3^{7}	ACCRSN	2,519	
12	7:00 p.m.	No. 8 North Carolina vs. No. 1 Virginia Tech	10–0	ACCRSN	7,117	
Saturday, May 28
Semifinal 1	1:00 p.m.	No. 8 North Carolina vs. No. 4 Notre Dame	7–2	ACCN	4,912	
Semifinal 2	5:00 p.m.	No. 11 Pittsburgh vs. No. 10 NC State	3–8	ACCN	8,360	
Championship – Sunday, May 29
Championship	12:00 p.m.	No. 10 NC State vs. No. 8 North Carolina	5–9	ESPN2	10,500	
*Game times in EDT. # – Rankings denote tournament seed.

== Pool Play ==
=== Pool A ===
Pos	Team	Pld	W	L	RF	RA	RD	PCT	Qualification
1	North Carolina	2	2	0	19	2	+17	1.000	Advance to Playoff round
2	Virginia Tech	2	1	1	18	16	+2	.500	
3	Clemson	2	0	2	8	27	−19	.000	

Source: ACC

May 24; 7:00 pm Game 3	Clemson	2–9	North Carolina	Truist Field; Attendance: 3,582
May 24; 7:00 pm Game 3	LP: Mack Anglin (6–6)	Boxscore	WP: Max Carlson (2–2)	Truist Field; Attendance: 3,582
May 24; 7:00 pm Game 3		Boxscore	HR: Mikey Madej (1)	Truist Field; Attendance: 3,582

May 26; 7:00 pm Game 9	Virginia Tech	18–6	Clemson	Truist Field; Attendance: 3,049
May 26; 7:00 pm Game 9	WP: Christian Worley (1–0)	Boxscore	LP: Billy Barlow (2–4)	Truist Field; Attendance: 3,049
May 26; 7:00 pm Game 9	HR: Nick Biddison (2); Gavin Cross (1); Tanner Schobel (1); Carson Jones (2)	Boxscore	HR: Max Wagner (1); Blake Wright (1); Camden Troyer (1)	Truist Field; Attendance: 3,049

May 27; 7:00 pm Game 12	North Carolina	10–0	Virginia Tech	Truist Field; Attendance: 7,117
May 27; 7:00 pm Game 12	WP: Brandon Schaeffer (7–2)	Boxscore	LP: Drue Hackenberg (10–2)	Truist Field; Attendance: 7,117
May 27; 7:00 pm Game 12	HR: Angel Zarate (1); Danny Serretti (1); Vance Honeycutt (2)	Boxscore		Truist Field; Attendance: 7,117

=== Pool B ===
Pos	Team	Pld	W	L	RF	RA	RD	PCT	Qualification
1	Pittsburgh	2	2	0	18	11	+7	1.000	Advance to Playoff round
2	Georgia Tech	2	1	1	15	16	−1	.500	
3	Louisville	2	0	2	9	15	−6	.000	

Source: ACC

May 24; 11:00 am Game 1	Pittsburgh	12–6	Georgia Tech	Truist Field; Attendance: 1,895
May 24; 11:00 am Game 1	WP: Matt Gilbertson (9–3); Sv: Jonathan Bautista (1)	Boxscore	LP: Sam Crawford (0–1)	Truist Field; Attendance: 1,895
May 24; 11:00 am Game 1	HR: Ron Washington, Jr. (1); Bryce Hulett (1)	Boxscore	HR: Tim Borden II (1)	Truist Field; Attendance: 1,895

May 25; 11:00 am Game 4	Louisville	5–6	Pittsburgh	Truist Field; Attendance: 2,141
May 25; 11:00 am Game 4	WP: Baron Stuart (2–4)	Boxscore	LP: Jared Poland (5–4)	Truist Field; Attendance: 2,141
May 25; 11:00 am Game 4	HR: Dalton Rushing (2); Levi Usher (1)	Boxscore	HR: Jeffrey Wehler (2); Tatem Levins (1)	Truist Field; Attendance: 2,141

May 26; 11:00 am Game 7	Georgia Tech	9–4	Louisville	Truist Field; Attendance: 1,989
May 26; 11:00 am Game 7	WP: Marquis Grissom, Jr. (4–5); Sv: Dawson Brown (5)	Boxscore	LP: Kade Grundy (1–1)	Truist Field; Attendance: 1,989

=== Pool C ===
Pos	Team	Pld	W	L	RF	RA	RD	PCT	Qualification
1	NC State	2	2	0	20	14	+6	1.000	Advance to Playoff round
2	Wake Forest	2	1	1	24	14	+10	.500	
3	Miami (FL)	2	0	2	9	25	−16	.000	

Source: ACC

May 24; 3:00 pm Game 2	NC State	11–8	Wake Forest	Truist Field; Attendance: 1,895
May 24; 3:00 pm Game 2	WP: Canaan Silver (7–1); Sv: Chris Villaman (10)	Boxscore	LP: Crawford Wade (3–1)	Truist Field; Attendance: 1,895
May 24; 3:00 pm Game 2	HR: Devonte Brown (1); Josh Hood (1); Payton Green (1)	Boxscore	HR: Brock Wilken (1)	Truist Field; Attendance: 1,895

May 25; 7:00 pm Game 6	Miami (FL)	6–9	NC State	Truist Field; Attendance: 3,579
May 25; 7:00 pm Game 6	LP: Carson Palmquist (9–4)	Boxscore	WP: Matt Willadsen (5–4); Sv: Chris Villaman (11)	Truist Field; Attendance: 3,579
May 25; 7:00 pm Game 6	HR: Yohandy Morales (1); Maxwell Romero, Jr. (1)	Boxscore	HR: Tommy White (3); Noah Soles (1)	Truist Field; Attendance: 3,579

May 27; 3:00 pm Game 11	Wake Forest	16–3 (F/7)	Miami (FL)	Truist Field; Attendance: 2,519
May 27; 3:00 pm Game 11	WP: Rhett Lowder (11–3)	Boxscore	LP: Karson Ligon (6–6)	Truist Field; Attendance: 2,519
May 27; 3:00 pm Game 11	HR: Brendan Tinsman (1); Nick Kurtz (1); Brock Wilken (1); Adam Cecere (2); Jake Reinisch (1); Lucas Costello (1)	Boxscore	HR: CJ Kayfus (1)	Truist Field; Attendance: 2,519

=== Pool D ===
Pos	Team	Pld	W	L	RF	RA	RD	PCT	Qualification
1	Notre Dame	2	2	0	8	3	+5	1.000	Advance to Playoff round
2	Florida State	2	1	1	16	8	+8	.500	
3	Virginia	2	0	2	3	16	−13	.000	

Source: ACC

May 25; 3:00 pm Game 5	Florida State	13–3 (F/8)	Virginia	Truist Field; Attendance: 2,141
May 25; 3:00 pm Game 5	WP: Wyatt Crowell (6–1)	Boxscore	LP: Brian Gursky (7–2)	Truist Field; Attendance: 2,141
May 25; 3:00 pm Game 5	HR: Reese Albert (1); Alex Toral (1)	Boxscore		Truist Field; Attendance: 2,141

May 26; 3:00 pm Game 8	Notre Dame	5–3	Florida State	Truist Field; Attendance: 1,989
May 26; 3:00 pm Game 8	WP: John M Bertrand (8–2); Sv: Alex Rao (3)	Boxscore	LP: Parker Messick (6–5)	Truist Field; Attendance: 1,989
May 26; 3:00 pm Game 8	HR: Brooks Coetzee (1); Jack Zyska (1); Zack Prajzner (1)	Boxscore		Truist Field; Attendance: 1,989

May 27; 11:00 am Game 10	Virginia	0–3	Notre Dame	Truist Field; Attendance: 2,519
May 27; 11:00 am Game 10	LP: Savino, N. (5–6)	Boxscore	WP: Liam Simon (2–0); Sv: Aidan Tyrell (1)	Truist Field; Attendance: 2,519

== Playoffs ==
Semifinals
8	North Carolina	7
4	Notre Dame	2
11	Pittsburgh	3
10	NC State	8

Finals
8	North Carolina	9
10	NC State	5

=== Semifinals ===
May 28; 1:00 pm	North Carolina	7–2	Notre Dame	Truist Field; Attendance: 4,912
May 28; 1:00 pm	WP: Shawn Rapp (4–0); Sv: Davis Palermo (5)	Boxscore	LP: Aidan Tyrell (5–1)	Truist Field; Attendance: 4,912
May 28; 1:00 pm		Boxscore	HR: Carter Putz (1); Jack Brannigan (1)	Truist Field; Attendance: 4,912

May 28; 5:00 pm	Pittsburgh	3–8	NC State	Truist Field; Attendance: 8,360
May 28; 5:00 pm	LP: Logan Evans (4–8)	Boxscore	WP: Silver (8–1)	Truist Field; Attendance: 8,360
May 28; 5:00 pm	HR: Ron Washington, Jr. (1)	Boxscore	HR: Brown, D. (1); T. White (1); Pilolli (1)	Truist Field; Attendance: 8,360

=== Championship Game ===
ACC Championship
(10) NC State Wolfpack	vs.	(8) North Carolina Tar Heels

May 29, 2022 12:00 p.m. (EDT) at Truist Field in Charlotte, North Carolina
Team	1	2	3	4	5	6	7	8	9	R	H	E
North Carolina State	1	0	0	0	0	2	0	0	2	5	11	1
North Carolina	2	6	0	1	0	0	0	0	x	9	8	1
WP: M.Carlson(3–2) LP: L.Whitaker(2–4); Home runs: NCST: None; UNC: V.Honeycutt(2); Attendance: 10,500

== All–Tournament Team ==
Position	Player	Team
C	Brendan Tinsman	Wake Forest
1B	LuJames Groover	NC State
2B	Jeff Wehler	Pittsburgh
3B	Brock Wilken	Wake Forest
SS	Danny Serretti	North Carolina
OF	Vance Honeycutt (MVP)	North Carolina
OF	Devonte Brown	NC State
OF	Angel Zarate	North Carolina
DH	Tommy White	NC State
P	Brandon Schaeffer	North Carolina
P	John Michael Bertrand	Notre Dame
