= Mike Bell (baseball coach) =

American college baseball coach and former pitcher

Current position
- Title: Head coach
- Team: Pittsburgh
- Conference: ACC
- Record: 161–174

Biographical details
- Born: October 14, 1972 (age 53); Sarasota, Florida, U.S.

Playing career
- 1992–1993: Pasco–Hernando State College
- 1994–1995: Florida State
- 1995: Vermont Expos
- 1995: Albany Polecats
- 1996: Delmarva Shorebirds
- 1996–1997: West Palm Beach Expos
- 1998: Jupiter Hammerheads
- 1998: Frederick Keys
- 1999–2000: Bowie Baysox
- Position: Pitcher

Coaching career (HC unless noted)
- 2001–2002: Brandon (FL) HS
- 2003–2004: Florida Southern (asst)
- 2005–2007: Tennessee (asst)
- 2008–2011: Oklahoma (asst)
- 2012–2018: Florida State (asst)
- 2019–present: Pittsburgh

Head coaching record
- Overall: 161–174
- Tournaments: ACC: 5–6; NCAA: 0–0

Michael John Bell (born October 14, 1972) is an American college baseball coach and former pitcher. Bell is the head coach of the Pittsburgh Panthers baseball team.

== Amateur career ==
Bell attended Riverview High School in Sarasota, Florida. As a member of the baseball team, Bell was a two-time All-Area selection. Upon graduation from Riverview, Bell enrolled at Pasco–Hernando State College. Bell was the first ever baseball signee in the history of Pasco–Hernando State, helping the Bobcats build their field, and hitting the first home run in program history. After graduating from Pasco–Hernando State, Bell accepted a baseball scholarship offer from Florida State University. In 1993, he played collegiate summer baseball with the Bourne Braves of the Cape Cod Baseball League. Bell helped the Seminoles to back-to-back College World Series appearances in 1994 and 1995.

== Professional career ==
The Montreal Expos selected Bell in the tenth round as a pitcher, with the 563rd overall selection, of the 1995 MLB draft. The Expos assigned Bell to the Vermont Expos of the Rookie-level New York–Penn League, where he made seven appearances before he was promoted to the Albany Polecats where he appeared in 12 games and had a 3.48 ERA.

Bell pitched for the Delmarva Shorebirds of the Class A South Atlantic League and the West Palm Beach Expos of the Class A-Advanced Florida State League in 1996, finishing the year with a 2.88 ERA in 53 games. In 1997, he played the entire season with West Palm Beach. He returned to Class A-Advanced when Expos changed their affiliate to the Jupiter Hammerheads. Bell finished the season with the Baltimore Orioles organization with the Frederick Keys. He had 7 wins, with a 2.94 ERA and 7 saves.

Bell played the final two seasons of his career with the Bowie Baysox. Bell flipped between long relief and starting, recording a 7–8 record with a 4.90 ERA.

== Coaching career ==
Following the conclusion of his playing career, Bell was named the head coach of Brandon High School in Brandon, Florida. He led the school to a regional semifinal finish in 2002 as well as a Class 4A-District 9 championship. He was named area coach of the year by the Florida Athletic Coaches Association. After two seasons at Brandon, Bell was named the pitching coach for Florida Southern College. The Mocs earned two berths in the NCAA Regionals, going 2–2 in Bell's two seasons with the team.

On August 9, 2004, Bell was hired as the pitching coach for the Tennessee Volunteers baseball team. In his first season with the Volunteers, Bell helped Luke Hochevar bounce back from an injury to earn the Southeastern Conference Baseball Pitcher of the Year and the Roger Clemens Award.

In 2007, Bell was named the pitching coach for the Oklahoma Sooners baseball program.

On June 24, 2011, Bell was hired as the pitching coach at Florida State.

On July 10, 2018, Bell was named the 8th head coach in the history of the Pittsburgh Panthers baseball program.

== Head coaching record ==
Record table
Season	Team	Overall	Conference	Standing	Postseason
Pittsburgh Panthers (Atlantic Coast Conference) (2019–present)
2019	Pittsburgh	21–34	8–22	7th (Coastal)	
2020	Pittsburgh	10–6	0–3	(Coastal)	Season canceled with COVID-19
2021	Pittsburgh	23–20	16–17	T-5th (Coastal)	ACC Tournament
2022	Pittsburgh	29–27	13–16	6th (Coastal)	ACC Tournament
2023	Pittsburgh	24–31	10–18	7th (Coastal)	ACC Tournament
2024	Pittsburgh	26–29	10–20	7th (Coastal)	ACC Tournament
2025	Pittsburgh	28–27	10–20	15th	ACC Tournament
2026	Pittsburgh	33–24	11–19	14th	ACC Tournament
Pittsburgh:		194–198	78–135		
Total:		194–198			
National champion Postseason invitational champion Conference regular season champion Conference regular season and conference tournament champion Division regular season champion Division regular season and conference tournament champion Conference tournament champion

== See also ==
- List of current NCAA Division I baseball coaches
