= Scott Forbes (baseball) =

American baseball coach (born 1974)

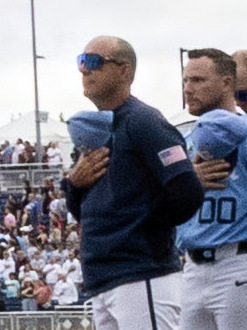
- Forbes with North Carolina at the 2026 College World Series

Current position
- Title: Head coach
- Team: North Carolina
- Conference: ACC
- Record: 254–118–1

Biographical details
- Born: August 4, 1974 (age 52); Sanford, North Carolina, U.S.

Playing career
- 1994: Middle Georgia
- 1995–1997: North Carolina Wesleyan

Coaching career (HC unless noted)
- 1998: North Carolina Wesleyan (asst.)
- 1999–2002: North Carolina (asst.)
- 2003–2005: Winthrop (asst.)
- 2006–2020: North Carolina (asst.)
- 2021–present: North Carolina

Head coaching record
- Overall: 254–118–1
- Tournaments: ACC: 12–3; NCAA: 24–16

Accomplishments and honors

Championships
- 2 ACC tournament (2022, 2025); ACC Coastal (2024); ACC regular season (2024)

Awards
- ACC Coach of the Year (2024)

Scott Forbes (born August 4, 1974) is an American college baseball coach and former player, who is the current head baseball coach for the North Carolina Tar Heels. He played college baseball at Middle Georgia College before transferring in 1994 to North Carolina Wesleyan College where he played for head coach Mike Fox from 1995 to 1997.

== Coaching career ==
In 1999, Forbes followed Fox to Fox's alma mater, North Carolina, to become an assistant coach. He left Chapel Hill to become an assistant coach for the Winthrop Eagles on August 27, 2002. He returned to UNC in 2006, and remained an assistant under Fox for the next 14 years.

=== North Carolina Head Coach ===
On August 7, 2020, Fox retired as the head baseball coach of the Tar Heels, and Forbes was named his successor. Forbes' tenure as the Tar Heels head coach got off to a hot start, going 6–0 before suffering their first loss to the Virginia Cavaliers on February 28, 2021. On April 12, against rival Duke, Forbes' Tar Heels routed the Blue Devils by scoring 21 runs, the most in a game since a win against Virginia Tech in 2013. The Tar Heels ended the season 28–27, finishing tied for third in the ACC Coastal Division. The team made it to the Lubbock Regional of the NCAA tournament (hosted by Texas Tech University) where they upset UCLA before ultimately being eliminated in the double-elimination bracket.

In his second season, Forbes' Tar Heels got off to another scorching start, compiling a record of 16–2 in the non-conference portion of the schedule. The Tar Heels soared as high as No. 6 nationally in some polls thanks to their hot hitting and strong pitching to start the year. Centerfielder Vance Honeycutt, the Tar Heels' freshman phenom, excelled early, hitting two home runs in his collegiate debut. However, the Tar Heels began to falter once ACC conference play began in the middle stretch of the season. Despite sweeping Pittsburgh and winning the next series against rivals Duke, the Tar Heels would lose their next five conference series, culminating in a sweep by-then-11th ranked Virginia. The month of May saw a dramatic upswing in the Tar Heels' fortunes, and put Forbes' team back in the hunt for a potential NCAA tournament bid.

After the Virginia sweep, the Tar Heels won 15 out of their next 17 games, including four straight wins in Charlotte in the ACC Tournament, leaving the Queen City with the ACC Championship and a legitimate chance to host an NCAA tournament regional. The Tar Heels beat rivals NC State 9–5 in the championship game to win the crown. The Tar Heels did earn a regional hosting bid, being selected as the No. 10 national seed. The Chapel Hill regional was paired up with the Stillwater Regional and No. 7 national seed Oklahoma State. In the winners' bracket game against VCU, Forbes was ejected and subsequently suspended for two games for arguing a controversial infield fly rule call. While the Heels lost the game, they won three straight games including back-to-back games against VCU. They faced Arkansas in the Chapel Hill super regional where they were swept in two games.

== Head coaching record ==
Record table
| Season | Team | Overall | Conference | Standing | Postseason |
|---|---|---|---|---|---|
North Carolina Tar Heels (Atlantic Coast Conference) (2021–present)
| 2021 | North Carolina | 28–27 | 18–18 | T–3rd (Coastal) | NCAA regional |
| 2022 | North Carolina | 42–22 | 15–15 | 4th (Coastal) | NCAA Super Regional |
| 2023 | North Carolina | 36–24 | 14–14 | 4th (Coastal) | NCAA regional |
| 2024 | North Carolina | 48–16 | 22–8 | 1st (Coastal) | College World Series |
| 2025 | North Carolina | 46–15 | 18–11 | 3rd | NCAA Super Regional |
| 2026 | North Carolina | 54–14–1 | 22–8 | 2nd | College World Series Runner-Up |
| North Carolina: | | 254–118–1 | 109–74 | | |
| Total: | | 254–118–1 | | | |
National champion Postseason invitational champion Conference regular season champion Conference regular season and conference tournament champion Division regular season champion Division regular season and conference tournament champion Conference tournament champion

== Personal life ==
Forbes is married to the former Mandy Passwaters. They have two daughters, Hannah and Ally. Hannah played volleyball at UNC Wilmington. Forbes is a Christian.

== See also ==
- List of current NCAA Division I baseball coaches
