= 2022 Clemson Tigers baseball team =

American college baseball season

2022 Clemson Tigers baseball
- Conference: Atlantic Coast Conference
- Record: 35–23 (13–16 ACC)
- Head coach: Monte Lee (7th season)
- Assistant coaches: Bradley LeCroy (15th season); Andrew See (7th season)
- Home stadium: Doug Kingsmore Stadium

2022 Atlantic Coast Conference baseball standings
	Conf.						Overall
Team	W		L		T	PCT	W		L		T	PCT
Atlantic
No. 12 Louisville ^{x}‍‍‍^{y}	18	–	11	–	1	.617	42	–	21	–	1	.664
No. 6 Notre Dame ‍‍‍^{y}	16	–	11	–	0	.593	41	–	17	–	0	.707
Wake Forest ‍‍‍^{y}	15	–	14	–	1	.517	41	–	19	–	1	.680
Florida State ‍‍‍^{y}	15	–	15	–	0	.500	34	–	25	–	0	.576
NC State ‍‍‍	14	–	15	–	0	.483	36	–	21	–	0	.632
Clemson ‍‍‍	13	–	16	–	0	.448	35	–	23	–	0	.603
Boston College ‍‍‍	5	–	25	–	0	.167	19	–	34	–	0	.358
Coastal
No. 11 Virginia Tech ^{x}‍‍‍^{y}	19	–	9	–	0	.679	45	–	14	–	0	.763
No. 20 Miami (FL) ‍‍‍^{y}	20	–	10	–	0	.667	40	–	19	–	0	.678
Virginia ‍‍‍^{y}	17	–	13	–	0	.567	39	–	19	–	0	.672
No. 14 North Carolina ‍‍‡‍^{y}	15	–	15	–	0	.500	42	–	22	–	0	.656
Georgia Tech ‍‍‍^{y}	15	–	15	–	0	.500	36	–	24	–	0	.600
Pittsburgh ‍‍‍	13	–	16	–	0	.448	29	–	27	–	0	.518
Duke ‍‍‍	10	–	20	–	0	.333	22	–	32	–	0	.407
x – Division champion ‡ – Tournament champion y – Invited to the NCAA tournament As of June 27, 2022; Rankings from D1Baseball

The 2022 Clemson Tigers baseball team were the varsity intercollegiate baseball team that represented Clemson University during the 2022 NCAA Division I baseball season. The Tigers competed in the Atlantic Coast Conference (ACC) and were led by seventh-year head coach Monte Lee. Clemson played its home games at Doug Kingsmore Stadium in Clemson, South Carolina.

Infielder Max Wagner won ACC Player of the Year while leading the ACC in home runs, Slugging Percentage, and OPS. Wagner was also named a First Team All-American by Collegiate Baseball.

The Tigers finished the season 35–23 overall and 13–16 in ACC Play, to finish in sixth place in the Atlantic Division. As the twelfth seed in the ACC tournament they were placed in pool A with first seed Virginia Tech and eight seed North Carolina. They lost both games and were eliminated from the tournament. They were not invited to the NCAA tournament for the second consecutive year. It was the first time the Tigers had missed the NCAA tournament in consecutive years since 1982-1986. It was their first time missing back-to-back tournaments since the field expanded to 64 teams in 1999. At the end of the season, Lee was fired as the head coach.

== Previous season ==
The Tigers finished the season 25–27 and 16–20 in ACC play to finish in fifth place in the Atlantic Division. As the eleventh seed in the ACC tournament they were placed in Pool B with second seed Georgia Tech and seventh seed Louisville. The Tigers lost to Louisville and defeated Georgia Tech. Their 1–1 record was not good enough to advance to the Semifinals and they were not invited to the NCAA tournament. The Tigers missed the NCAA tournament for the first time since 2008 and just the second time since 1987. This was also Clemson's first losing season since 1957. It was also head coach Monte Lee's first time missing the NCAA tournament as a head coach.

== Personnel ==
=== Roster ===
2022 Clemson Tigers roster
Pitchers: 15 - Reed Garris - Freshman; 22 - Ricky Williams - Sophomore; 23 - Geoffrey Gilbert - (redshirt) Sophomore; 25 - Jackson Lindley - (redshirt) Junior; 26 - Casey Tallent - Freshman; 30 - Billy Barlow - Freshman; 32 - Mack Anglin - (redshirt) Sophomore; 35 - Jay Dill - Freshman; 36 - Ty Olenchuk - Sophomore; 37 - Nick Hoffmann - (redshirt) Sophomore; 39 - P.J. Labriola - (redshirt) Sophomore; 41 - Alex Edmondson - Sophomore; 42 - Ryan Ammons - (redshirt) Sophomore; 43 - Camden Troyer - Freshman; 44 - Nick Clayton - (redshirt) Sophomore; 48 - Rob Hughes - (redshirt) Junior; 51 - Rocco Reid - Freshman; 53 - Josh Davis - Freshman; 56 - Austin Gordon - Freshman	Catchers: 9 - Jonathan French - (redshirt) Sophomore; 12 - Cooper Ingle - (redshirt) Sophomore; 49 - Caid Byrd - Freshman; 52 - Patrick Farrisee - (redshirt) Freshman; Infielders: 1 - Tyler Corbitt - (redshirt) Junior; 4 - Benjamin Blackwell - (redshirt) Junior; 5 - Gavin Abrams - Freshman; 6 - Aries Samek - Freshman; 8 - Blake Wright - Sophomore; 10 - Bryar Hawkins - (redshirt) Junior; 13 - David Lewis - Freshman; 17 - Billy Amick - Freshman; 24 - Mac Starbuc - (redshirt) Sophomore; 29 - Max Wagner - Sophomore; 31 - Caden Grice - Sophomore	Outfielders: 3 - Dylan Brewer - (redshirt) Sophomore; 11 - Chad Fairey - (redshirt) Sophomore; 16 - Will Taylor - Freshman; 20 - Spencer Rich - (redshirt) Sophomore; 21 - J.D. Brock - (redshirt) Sophomore; 27 - Tristan Bissetta - Freshman

=== Coaching staff ===
2022 Clemson Tigers coaching staff
Name	Position	Seasons at Clemson
Monte Lee	Head coach	7
Bradley LeCroy	Assistant Coach	15
Andrew See	Assistant Coach	7
Jared Broughton	Volunteer Assistant Coach	3

== Schedule ==
Legend
	Clemson win
	Clemson loss
	Cancellation
**Bold**	Clemson team member
*	Non-Conference game
†	Make-Up Game

2022 Clemson Tigers baseball game log
Regular season

February (7–0)
Date	Opponent	Rank	Site/stadium	Score	Win	Loss	Save	Attendance	Overall record	ACC record
Feb 18	Indiana*		Doug Kingsmore Stadium • Clemson, SC	**W** 9–0	**Anglin** (1–0)	Modugno (0–1)	None	5,279	1–0	0–0
Feb 19	Indiana*		Doug Kingsmore Stadium • Clemson, SC	**W** 19–4	**Gilbert** (1–0)	Bothwell (0–1)	None	5,695	2–0	0–0
Feb 20	Indiana*		Doug Kingsmore Stadium • Clemson, SC	**W** 5–4 (10)	**Grice** (1–0)	Tucker (0–1)	None	4,430	3–0	0–0
Feb 22	College of Charleston*		Doug Kingsmore Stadium • Clemson, SC	**W** 2–1	**Lindley** (1–0)	Pooser (1–1)	**Ammons** (1)	3,965	4–0	0–0
Feb 25	Hartford*		Doug Kingsmore Stadium • Clemson, SC	**W** 6–1	**Anglin** (2–0)	Blaisdell (0–1)	None	4,636	5–0	0–0
Feb 26	Hartford*		Doug Kingsmore Stadium • Clemson, SC	**W** 13–3	**Olenchuck** (1–0)	Judenis (0–1)	None	N/A, part of doubleheader	6–0	0–0
Feb 26	Hartford*		Doug Kingsmore Stadium • Clemson, SC	**W** 28–3	**Hoffmann** (1–0)	Nowak (0–1)	None	5,190	7–0	0–0

March (10–7)
Date	Opponent	Rank	Site/stadium	Score	Win	Loss	Save	Attendance	Overall record	ACC record
Mar 1	USC Upstate*		Doug Kingsmore Stadium • Clemson, SC	**W** 8–5	**Edmondson** (1–0)	Davis (1–2)	**Ammons** (2)	3,851	8–0	0–0
Mar 4	at South Carolina*; Rivalry		Founders Park • Columbia, SC	**W** 3–2	**Edmondson** (2–0)	Gilreath (0–1)	**Ammons** (3)	8,242	9–0	0–0
Mar 5	vs South Carolina*; Rivalry		Segra Park • Columbia, SC	**W** 10–2	**Hoffmann** (2–0)	Hall (0–1)	None	9,070	10–0	0–0
Mar 6	South Carolina*; Rivalry		Doug Kingsmore Stadium • Clemson, SC	**W** 5–2	**Lindley** (2–0)	Hunter (2–1)	**Ammons** (4)	6,636	11–0	0–0
Mar 8	East Tennessee State*	No. 19	Doug Kingsmore Stadium • Clemson, SC	Postponed to April 20 due to inclement weather						
Mar 9	vs Michigan State*	No. 19	Fluor Field • Greenville, SC	**W** 4–2	**Lindley** (3–0)	Dunning (1–2)	**Dill** (1)	4,383	12–0	0–0
Mar 11	Northeastern*	No. 19	Doug Kingsmore Stadium • Clemson, SC	**W** 9–6	**Anglin** (3–0)	Schlittler (1–3)	None	3,691	13–0	0–0
Mar 12	Northeastern*	No. 19	Doug Kingsmore Stadium • Clemson, SC	**W** 10–4	**Hoffman** (3–0)	Keane (1–2)	None	4,315	14–0	0–0
Mar 13	Northeastern*	No. 19	Doug Kingsmore Stadium • Clemson, SC	**L** 3–5	Scotti (4–0)	**Clayton** (0–1)	Balboni (1)	3,720	14–1	0–0
Mar 15	Georgia State*	No. 18	Doug Kingsmore Stadium • Clemson, SC	**L** 1–6	Treadway (3–0)	**Barlow** (0–1)	None	3,819	14–2	0–0
Mar 18	Miami (FL)	No. 18	Doug Kingsmore Stadium • Clemson, SC	**L** 4–11	Palmquist (4–1)	**Anglin** (3–1)	None	3,778	14–3	0–1
Mar 19	Miami (FL)	No. 18	Doug Kingsmore Stadium • Clemson, SC	**L** 1–4	Ligon (3–1)	**Hoffmann** (3–1)	Walters (4)	4,404	14–4	0–2
Mar 20	Miami (FL)	No. 18	Doug Kingsmore Stadium • Clemson, SC	**W** 20–5	**Lindley** (4–0)	McFarlane (2–1)	None	3,863	15–4	1–2
Mar 22	Coastal Carolina*	No. 24	Doug Kingsmore Stadium • Clemson, SC	**L** 7–16	Joyce (4–0)	**Barlow** (0–2)	None	3,963	15–5	1–2
Mar 23	Winthrop*	No. 24	Doug Kingsmore Stadium • Clemson, SC	**W** 10–2	**Williams** (1–0)	Ohs (0–2)	None	3,558	16–5	1–2
Mar 25	at Pittsburgh	No. 24	Petersen Sports Complex • Pittsburgh, PA	**L** 0–8	Gilbertson (3–2)	**Anglin** (3–2)	None	776	16–6	1–3
Mar 25	at Pittsburgh	No. 24	Petersen Sports Complex • Pittsburgh, PA	**L** 7–10	Evans (3–1)	**Hoffmann** (3–2)	Stuart (2)	776	16–7	1–4
Mar 26	at Pittsburgh	No. 24	Petersen Sports Complex • Pittsburgh, PA	Canceled						
Mar 29	at Winthrop*		Winthrop Ballpark • Rock Hill, SC	**W** 9–3	**Olenchuk** (2–0)	Butcher (0–1)	None	1,676	17–7	1–4

April (11–9)
Date	Opponent	Rank	Site/stadium	Score	Win	Loss	Save	Attendance	Overall record	ACC record
Apr 1	NC State		Doug Kingsmore Stadium • Clemson, SC	**W** 14–3	**Anglin** (4–2)	Willadsen (1–2)	None	4,419	18–7	2–4
Apr 2	NC State		Doug Kingsmore Stadium • Clemson, SC	**L** 2–5	Silver (3–0)	**Hoffmann** (3–3)	Villaman (5)	4,513	18–8	2–5
Apr 3	NC State		Doug Kingsmore Stadium • Clemson, SC	**L** 7–9	Lawson (2–1)	**Ammons** (0–1)	Villaman (6)	4,296	18–9	2–6
Apr 5	No. 14 Georgia*		Doug Kingsmore Stadium • Clemson, SC	**W** 4–3	**Barlow** (1–2)	Bearden (1–1)	**Ammons** (5)	4,078	19–9	2–6
Apr 8	at No. 13 Notre Dame		Frank Eck Stadium • South Bend, IN	**L** 1–4	Bertrand (5–0)	**Anglin** (4–3)	McLinskey (3)	300	19–10	2–7
Apr 9	at No. 13 Notre Dame		Frank Eck Stadium • South Bend, IN	**L** 1–8	Temple (3–0)	**Hoffmann** (3–4)	None	436	19–11	2–8
Apr 10	at No. 13 Notre Dame		Frank Eck Stadium • South Bend, IN	**L** 3–9	Kimball (3–0)	**Gilbert** (1–1)	Rao (1)	883	19–12	2–9
Apr 12	vs USC Upstate*		Fluor Field • Greenville, SC	**W** 11–2	**Tallent** (1–0)	Payne (0–1)	None	2,369	20–12	2–9
Apr 15	at Wake Forest		David F. Couch Ballpark • Winston-Salem, NC	**W** 1–0	**Gilbert** (2–1)	Minacci (1–1)	None	1,872	21–12	3–9
Apr 16	at Wake Forest		David F. Couch Ballpark • Winston-Salem, NC	**L** 9–12 (10)	Minacci (2–1)	**Ammons** (0–2)	None	2,227	21–13	3–10
Apr 17	at Wake Forest		David F. Couch Ballpark • Winston-Salem, NC	**W** 10–8	**Gilbert** (3–1)	McGraw (3–2)	**Lindley** (1)	1,119	22–13	4–10
Apr 19	at No. 14 Georgia*		Foley Field • Athens, GA	**W** 8–4	**Lindley** (5–0)	Pearson (2–2)	None	3,328	23–13	4–10
Apr 20	East Tennessee State*		Doug Kingsmore Stadium • Clemson, SC	**W** 12–2	**Grice** (2–0)	Stuart (3–2)	None	3,798	24–13	4–10
Apr 22	Florida State		Doug Kingsmore Stadium • Clemson, SC	**W** 6–4	**Lindley** (6–0)	Hare (1–1)	**Ammons** (6)	4,405	25–13	5–10
Apr 23	Florida State		Doug Kingsmore Stadium • Clemson, SC	**L** 3–4	Whittaker (2–1)	**Hoffmann** (3–5)	None	4,608	25–14	5–11
Apr 24	Florida State		Doug Kingsmore Stadium • Clemson, SC	**W** 8–5	**Ammons** (1–2)	Hare (1–2)	None	4,110	26–14	6–11
Apr 26	Presbyterian*		Doug Kingsmore Stadium • Clemson, SC	**W** 12–3	**Williams** (2–0)	Klepper (0–6)	None	3,916	27–14	6–11
Apr 27	No. 25 Wofford*		Doug Kingsmore Stadium • Clemson, SC	**W** 17–4	**Dill** (1–0)	Schwaner (0–1)	None	3,788	28–14	6–11
Apr 29	at No. 16 Louisville		Jim Patterson Stadium • Louisville, KY	**L** 2–7	Poland (3–2)	**Anglin** (4–4)	None	2,722	28–15	6–12
Apr 30	at No. 16 Louisville		Jim Patterson Stadium • Louisville, KY	**L** 8–10	Kuehner (5–3)	**Gilbert** (3–2)	None	2,917	28–16	6–13

May (7–5)
Date	Opponent	Rank	Site/stadium	Score	Win	Loss	Save	Attendance	Overall record	ACC record
May 1	at No. 16 Louisville		Jim Patterson Stadium • Louisville, KY	**L** 15–18	Schmeltz (1–0)	**Dill** (1–1)	Prosecky (8)	2,788	28–17	6–14
May 6	No. 21 Georgia Tech		Doug Kingsmore Stadium • Clemson, SC	**W** 9–3	**Anglin** (5–4)	Medich (4–4)	None	4,029	29–17	7–14
May 7	No. 21 Georgia Tech		Doug Kingsmore Stadium • Clemson, SC	**W** 12–9	**Gordon** (1–0)	Grissom (2–5)	**Ammons** (7)	4,342	30–17	8–14
May 8	No. 21 Georgia Tech		Doug Kingsmore Stadium • Clemson, SC	**W** 14–2	**Dill** (2–1)	Huff (3–4)	None	4,001	31–17	9–14
May 10	vs College of Charleston*		Segra Park • Columbia, SC	**L** 5–7	Good (8–4)	**Dill** (2–2)	Privette (11)	2,727	31–18	9–14
May 13	at No. 12 Virginia		Davenport Field at Disharoon Park • Charlottesville, VA	**L** 6–11	Buchanan (3–1)	**Anglin** (5–5)	Neeck (3)	2,860	31–19	9–15
May 15	at No. 12 Virginia		Davenport Field at Disharoon Park • Charlottesville, VA	**W** 8–2	**Gilbert** (4–2)	Savino (4–5)	**Gordon** (1)	3,409	32–19	10–15
May 15	at No. 12 Virginia		Davenport Field at Disharoon Park • Charlottesville, VA	**L** 3–6	Kosanovich (4–0)	**Barlow** (1–3)	None	3,848	32–20	10–16
May 17	at Coastal Carolina*		Springs Brooks Stadium • Conway, SC	**L** 2–17	Potok (4–0)	**Hoffmann** (3–6)	None	3,516	32–21	10–16
May 19	Boston College		Doug Kingsmore Stadium • Clemson, SC	**W** 15–1	**Anglin** (6–5)	Mancini (4–4)	None	3,749	33–21	11–16
May 20	Boston College		Doug Kingsmore Stadium • Clemson, SC	**W** 6–2	**Gilbert** (5–2)	Leake (2–3)	**Gordon** (2)	3,421	34–21	12–16
May 21	Boston College		Doug Kingsmore Stadium • Clemson, SC	**W** 5-0	**Barlow** (2–3)	Schroeder (0–6)	**Ammons** (8)	4,017	35–21	13–16

Postseason

ACC Tournament (0–2)
Date	Opponent	Rank	Site/stadium	Score	Win	Loss	Save	Attendance	Overall record	Tournament record
May 24	North Carolina		Truist Field • Charlotte, NC	**L** 2–9	Carlson (2–2)	**Anglin** (6–6)	None	3,582	35–22	0–1
May 26	No. 2 Virginia Tech		Truist Field • Charlotte, NC	**L** 6–18	Worley (1–0)	**Barlow** (2–4)	None	3,049	35–23	0–2

Note: All rankings shown are from D1Baseball poll.

== Rankings ==
Ranking movements Legend: ██ Increase in ranking ██ Decrease in ranking — = Not ranked RV = Received votes
	Week																		
Poll	Pre	1	2	3	4	5	6	7	8	9	10	11	12	13	14	15	16	17	Final
Coaches'	—	—*	RV	21	19	24	RV	RV	—	—	—	—	RV	—	—	—	—*	—*	—
Baseball America	—	—	—	21	15	20	—	—	—	—	—	—	—	—	—	—	—*	—*	—
Collegiate Baseball^	—	—	—	—	20	—	—	—	—	—	—	—	—	—	—	—	—	—	—
NCBWA†	RV	RV	29	21	20	26	RV	RV	—	—	—	—	RV	—	—	—	—	—*	—
D1Baseball	—	—	—	19	18	24	—	—	—	—	—	—	—	—	—	—	—*	—*	—

^ Collegiate Baseball ranked 40 teams in their preseason poll, but only ranked 30 teams weekly during the season.
† NCBWA ranks 30 teams in their preseason poll, but only ranks 25 teams weekly during the season.
* A new poll was not released for this week, so for comparison purposes, the previous week's ranking is inserted in this week's slot.

== 2022 MLB draft ==
Player	Position	Round	Overall	MLB team
Max Wagner	3B	2	42	Baltimore Orioles
Mack Anglin	RHP	7	205	Kansas City Royals
Geoffrey Gilbert	LHP	13	400	New York Yankees
