= 2022 Pittsburgh Panthers baseball team =

American college baseball season

2022 Pittsburgh Panthers baseball
- Conference: Atlantic Coast Conference
- Coastal
- Record: 29–27 (13–16 ACC)
- Head coach: Mike Bell (4th season)
- Assistant coaches: Joe Mercadante (1st season); Devin Mesoraco (1st season)
- Hitting coach: Ty Megahee (4th season)
- Home stadium: Charles L. Cost Field

2022 Atlantic Coast Conference baseball standings
	Conf.						Overall
Team	W		L		T	PCT	W		L		T	PCT
Atlantic
No. 12 Louisville ^{x}‍‍‍^{y}	18	–	11	–	1	.617	42	–	21	–	1	.664
No. 6 Notre Dame ‍‍‍^{y}	16	–	11	–	0	.593	41	–	17	–	0	.707
Wake Forest ‍‍‍^{y}	15	–	14	–	1	.517	41	–	19	–	1	.680
Florida State ‍‍‍^{y}	15	–	15	–	0	.500	34	–	25	–	0	.576
NC State ‍‍‍	14	–	15	–	0	.483	36	–	21	–	0	.632
Clemson ‍‍‍	13	–	16	–	0	.448	35	–	23	–	0	.603
Boston College ‍‍‍	5	–	25	–	0	.167	19	–	34	–	0	.358
Coastal
No. 11 Virginia Tech ^{x}‍‍‍^{y}	19	–	9	–	0	.679	45	–	14	–	0	.763
No. 20 Miami (FL) ‍‍‍^{y}	20	–	10	–	0	.667	40	–	19	–	0	.678
Virginia ‍‍‍^{y}	17	–	13	–	0	.567	39	–	19	–	0	.672
No. 14 North Carolina ‍‍‡‍^{y}	15	–	15	–	0	.500	42	–	22	–	0	.656
Georgia Tech ‍‍‍^{y}	15	–	15	–	0	.500	36	–	24	–	0	.600
Pittsburgh ‍‍‍	13	–	16	–	0	.448	29	–	27	–	0	.518
Duke ‍‍‍	10	–	20	–	0	.333	22	–	32	–	0	.407
x – Division champion ‡ – Tournament champion y – Invited to the NCAA tournament As of June 27, 2022; Rankings from D1Baseball

The Pittsburgh Panthers baseball team is a baseball team that represents the University of Pittsburgh in the 2022 NCAA Division I baseball season. The Panthers are members of the Atlantic Coast Conference in the Coastal Division and play their home games at Charles L. Cost Field in Pittsburgh, Pennsylvania. They are led by fourth-year head coach Mike Bell.

== Previous season ==
The Panthers finished the 2021 NCAA Division I baseball season 23–20 overall (16–17 conference) and tied for fifth place in Coastal Division standings. Following the conclusion of the regular season, the Panthers were selected to play in the 2021 ACC Tournament. The Panthers would eventually lose in Pool Play 0–2 to NC State Wolfpack.

== Roster ==
2022 Pittsburgh Panthers baseball team
Players
Coaches

#	Pos.	Name	B/T	Height	Weight	Year	Previous school	Home town
1	INF	Tommy Tavarez	R/R	5 ft 11 in (1.8 m)	160 lb (73 kg)	Fr	Citius Prep	Brooklyn, New York
2	INF	Jeffrey Wehler	R/R	5 ft 11 in (1.8 m)	181 lb (82 kg)	Sr	St Marys Area H.S.	St. Marys, Pennsylvania
3	INF	Sky Duff	L/R	5 ft 9 in (1.75 m)	180 lb (82 kg)	Jr	Eustace Preparatory School	Shamong, New Jersey
5	OF	Jordan Anderson	R/R	6 ft 1 in (1.85 m)	185 lb (84 kg)	Sr	James Clemens H.S.	Madison, Alabama
6	OF	Dom Popa	L/L	5 ft 11 in (1.8 m)	170 lb (77 kg)	So	Seton-La Salle Catholic H.S.	Pittsburgh, Pennsylvania
8	RHP	Brady Devereux	R/R	6 ft 2 in (1.88 m)	200 lb (91 kg)	RS So	Malvern Preparatory School	Glen Mills, Pennsylvania
11	INF	Brock Franks	L/R	6 ft 1 in (1.85 m)	180 lb (82 kg)	Jr	Rancho Bernardo H.S.	San Diego, California
13	OF	Nick Giamarusti	R/R	6 ft 0 in (1.83 m)	183 lb (83 kg)	Fr	Notre Dame College Prep	Chicago, Illinois
14	C	Tatem Levins	L/R	6 ft 0 in (1.83 m)	206 lb (93 kg)	Jr	Notre Dame H.S.	Langhorne, Pennsylvania
15	INF	Bryce Hulett	L/L	6 ft 2 in (1.88 m)	200 lb (91 kg)	Sr	Lake Wales H.S.	Lake Wales, Florida
17		Josh Overbeek	S/R	6 ft 1 in (1.85 m)	197 lb (89 kg)	Fr	Anderson H.S.	Cincinnati, Ohio
18	C	Johnny Long	R/R	5 ft 9 in (1.75 m)	174 lb (79 kg)	So	Barron G. Collier H.S.	Naples, Florida
19	C	Luke Lambert	R/R	5 ft 7 in (1.7 m)	174 lb (79 kg)	Fr	West Allegheny Senior H.S.	McDonald, Pennsylvania
20	INF	Cameron Barto	S/R	5 ft 11 in (1.8 m)	175 lb (79 kg)	RS So	Lancaster Catholic H.S.	Lancaster, Pennsylvania
21	OF	Kyle Hess	L/R	6 ft 1 in (1.85 m)	200 lb (91 kg)	Jr	Lancaster Catholic H.S.	Mount Joy, Pennsylvania
23	OF	Ron Washington	R/R	6 ft 1 in (1.85 m)	215 lb (98 kg)	Sr	Ridge Point H.S.	Houston, Texas
24	LHP	Ben Dragani	L/L	6 ft 4 in (1.93 m)	238 lb (108 kg)	RS Jr	Catholic Memorial H.S.	Brookfield, Wisconsin
26	RHP	Baron Stuart	R/R	6 ft 2 in (1.88 m)	209 lb (95 kg)	Sr	Okeechobee H.S.	Okeechobee, Florida
27	RHP	Hayden Summers	R/R	5 ft 10 in (1.78 m)	175 lb (79 kg)	So	Northwest Guilford H.S.	Greensboro, North Carolina
28	RHP	Brendon Bair	R/R	6 ft 0 in (1.83 m)	215 lb (98 kg)	Fr	Bishop McCort H.S.	Johnstown, Pennsylvania
29	RHP	Jonathan Bautista	R/R	6 ft 3 in (1.91 m)	202 lb (92 kg)	Fr	Springside Chestnut Hill Academy	Philadelphia, Pennsylvania
30	RHP	Tyler Kennedy	R/R	6 ft 3 in (1.91 m)	223 lb (101 kg)	Fr	Georgia Premier Academy	Columbia, South Carolina
31	RHP	Kyle Demi	R/R	6 ft 1 in (1.85 m)	221 lb (100 kg)	Fr	North Allegheny Senior H.S.	Wexford, Pennsylvania
32	RHP	Billy Corcoran	R/R	6 ft 8 in (2.03 m)	220 lb (100 kg)	Jr	Malvern Preparatory School	Milmont Park, Pennsylvania
33	INF	Jack Anderson	R/R	6 ft 3 in (1.91 m)	217 lb (98 kg)	Jr	Mars Area H.S.	Mars, Pennsylvania
34	LHP	Will Droll	L/L	6 ft 1 in (1.85 m)	185 lb (84 kg)	Fr	St. Ignatius	Thunder Bay, Ontario
35	LHP	Harrison Coble	L/L	6 ft 0 in (1.83 m)	165 lb (75 kg)	Fr	St. Christopher's School	Richmond, Virginia
36	RHP	Dylan Lester	R/R	6 ft 1 in (1.85 m)	210 lb (95 kg)	RS Sr	Brenham H.S.	Brenham, Texas
38	RHP	C. J. McKennitt	R/R	6 ft 2 in (1.88 m)	210 lb (95 kg)	Jr	St. Mark's School	Concord, Massachusetts
39	OF	C. J. Funk	R/R	6 ft 0 in (1.83 m)	215 lb (98 kg)	So	Bellefonte Area H.S.	Bellefonte, Pennsylvania
43	RHP	Ryan Miller	R/R	6 ft 1 in (1.85 m)	217 lb (98 kg)	Jr	Fleetwood Area H.S.	Blandon, Pennsylvania
45	RHP	Matt Gilbertson	R/R	6 ft 0 in (1.83 m)	190 lb (86 kg)	Sr	Green Valley H.S.	Henderson, Nevada
46	LHP	Quin Konuszewski	L/L	5 ft 11 in (1.8 m)	182 lb (83 kg)	Fr	Heritage H.S.	Saginaw, Michigan
48	RHP	David Ferguson	R/R	6 ft 6 in (1.98 m)	220 lb (100 kg)	So	Downingtown H.S.	Downingtown, Pennsylvania
49	RHP	Dominic Verrastro	R/R	6 ft 1 in (1.85 m)	175 lb (79 kg)	Jr	Lakeland H.S.	Scott Township, Lackawanna County, Pennsylvania
55	RHP	Logan Evans	R/R	6 ft 3 in (1.91 m)	223 lb (101 kg)	So	Saline H.S.	Saline, Michigan

Head coach

Mike Bell

Assistant coach(es)

Joe Mercadante

Hitting coach(es)

Ty Megahee

Base coach(es)

Devin Mesoraco

Legend

- (C) Team captain
- (S) Suspended
- (I) Ineligible
- Injured
- Current redshirt

Roster

== Schedule ==
2022 Pittsburgh Panthers baseball game log
Regular season
February (5–3)

#	Date	Rank	Opponent	Site/stadium	Score	Win	Loss	Save	Attendance	Overall record	ACC record
1	February 18		vs Canisius	Centennial Park • Port Charlotte, Florida	3–11	Duffy (1–0)	Gilbertson (0–1)	None	333	0–1	–
2	February 19		vs Canisius	Centennial Park • Port Charlotte, Florida	12–2	Corcoran (1–0)	Abbott (0–1)	None	222	1–1	–
3	February 19		vs Canisius	Centennial Park • Port Charlotte, Florida	4–0	Evans (1–0)	Duffy (0–1)	Summers (1)	227	2–1	–
4	February 20		vs Canisius	Centennial Park • Port Charlotte, Florida	7–15	Consigli (1–0)	Dragani (0–1)	None	249	2–2	–
5	February 25		vs Bradley	Dugan Field • Nashville, Tennessee	4–3	Gilbertson (1–1)	Jausel (0–1)	Summers (2)	197	3–2	–
6	February 26		vs Bradley	Dugan Field • Nashville, Tennessee	2–3	Kisting (0–1)	Corcoran (1–1)	Catton (1)	107	3–3	–
7	February 26		at Lipscomb	Dugan Field • Nashville, Tennessee	16–0	Evans (2–0)	Van Treeck (0–1)	None	127	4–3	–
8	February 27		at Lipscomb	Dugan Field • Nashville, Tennessee	6–5	Stuart (1–0)	Cheatwood (0–1)	None	257	5–3	–

March (8–7)

#	Date	Rank	Opponent	Site/stadium	Score	Win	Loss	Save	Attendance	Overall record	ACC record
9	March 4		vs Army	Segra Stadium • Fayetteville, North Carolina	3–5	Dennehy (1–1)	Stuart (1–1)	Gresham (1)	459	5–4	–
10	March 5		vs Ohio State	Segra Stadium • Fayetteville, North Carolina	6–5	Summers (1–0)	Brock (0–1)	None	689	6–4	–
11	March 6		vs Campbell	Segra Stadium • Fayetteville, North Carolina	11–5	Corcoran (2–1)	Rund (0–1)	None	–	7–4	–
12	March 9		at High Point	Williard Stadium • High Point, North Carolina	15–5	Dragani (1–1)	Viar (0–1)	None	404	8–4	–
13	March 11		at No. 15 North Carolina	Boshamer Stadium • Chapel Hill, North Carolina	4–7	Mott (3–0)	Gilbertson (1–2)	O'Brien (3)	–	8–5	0–1
14	March 12		at No. 15 North Carolina	Boshamer Stadium • Chapel Hill, North Carolina	3–4	Peavyhouse (1–1)	Summers (1–1)	None	1,645	8–6	0–2
15	March 13		at No. 15 North Carolina	Boshamer Stadium • Chapel Hill, North Carolina	2–9	Mott (4–0)	Stuart (1–2)	Rapp (1)	1,637	8–7	0–3
16	March 15		Bucknell	Charles L. Cost Field • Pittsburgh, Pennsylvania	21–6	Devereux (1–0)	Magovern (0–2)	None	411	9–7	0–3
17	March 16		Youngstown State	Charles L. Cost Field • Pittsburgh, Pennsylvania	2–5	Mikos (2–0)	Miller (0–1)	None	240	9–8	0–3
18	March 18		at Virginia Tech	English Field • Blacksburg, Virginia	4–3	Gilbertson (2–2)	Hurney (1–1)	Stuart (3)	461	10–8	1–3
19	March 19		at Virginia Tech	English Field • Blacksburg, Virginia	6–22	Hackenberg (4–0)	Evans (2–1)	None	1,391	10–9	1–4
20	March 20		at Virginia Tech	English Field • Blacksburg, Virginia	1–7	Weycker (3–0)	Corcoran (2–2)	None	574	10–10	1–5
21	March 23		Kent State	Charles L. Cost Field • Pittsburgh, Pennsylvania	Postponed						
22	March 25		Clemson	Charles L. Cost Field • Pittsburgh, Pennsylvania	8–0	Gilbertson (3–2)	Anglin (3–2)	None	776	11–10	2–5
23	March 25		Clemson	Charles L. Cost Field • Pittsburgh, Pennsylvania	10–7	Evans (3–1)	Hoffmann (3–2)	Stuart (2)	776	12–10	3–5
24	March 27		Clemson	Charles L. Cost Field • Pittsburgh, Pennsylvania	Canceled						
25	March 29		at Penn State	Medlar Field • University Park, Pennsylvania	Postponed						
26	March 21		West Virginia	Charles L. Cost Field • Pittsburgh, Pennsylvania	9–6	Devereux (2–0)	Sleeper (1–4)	Stuart (3)	340	13–10	3–5

April (11–7)

#	Date	Rank	Opponent	Site/stadium	Score	Win	Loss	Save	Attendance	Overall record	ACC record
27	April 1		No. 5 Louisville	Charles L. Cost Field • Pittsburgh, Pennsylvania	8–7	Gilberton (4–2)	Kuehner (4–1)	None	467	14–10	4–5
28	April 2		No. 5 Louisville	Charles L. Cost Field • Pittsburgh, Pennsylvania	6–14	Poland (2–1)	Evans (3–2)	None	489	14–11	4–6
29	April 3		No. 5 Louisville	Charles L. Cost Field • Pittsburgh, Pennsylvania	3–2	Corcoran (3–2)	Phillips (3–1)	None	360	15–11	5–6
30	April 6		at Youngstown State	Eastwood Field • Niles, Ohio	9–1	Devereux (3–0)	Perez (1–3)	None	165	16–11	5–6
31	April 8		at Boston College	Eddie Pellagrini Diamond • Brighton, Massachusetts	13–3	Gilbertson (5–2)	Mancini (2–2)	None	313	17–11	6–6
32	April 9		at Boston College	Eddie Pellagrini Diamond • Brighton, Massachusetts	8–9	Ryan (2–2)	Evans (3–3)	Coffey (3)	289	17–12	6–7
33	April 10		at Boston College	Eddie Pellagrini Diamond • Brighton, Massachusetts	10–9	Corcoran (4–2)	Pelio (1–3)	Stuart (4)	408	18–12	7–7
34	April 12		at Kent State	Schoonover Stadium • Kent, Ohio	12–5	Dragani (2–1)	Rocco (0–1)	None	663	19–12	7–7
35	April 15		No. 8 Virginia	Charles L. Cost Field • Pittsburgh, Pennsylvania	W 9–4	Gilbertson (6–2)	Savino (4–3)	None	632	20–12	8–7
36	April 16		No. 8 Virginia	Charles L. Cost Field • Pittsburgh, Pennsylvania	L 0–18	Gursky (6–0)	Evans (3–4)	None	608	20–13	8–8
37	April 17		No. 8 Virginia	Charles L. Cost Field • Pittsburgh, Pennsylvania	W 4–1	Corcoran (5–2)	Berry (4–3)	Stuart (5)	398	21–13	9–8
38	April 20		vs West Virginia	PNC Park • Pittsburgh, Pennsylvania	L 2–3	Abernathy (1–0)	Devereux (3–1)	None	861	21–14	9–8
39	April 22		at No. 5 Miami (FL)	Alex Rodriguez Park at Mark Light Field • Coral Gables, Florida	L 1–2 (10)	Arguelles (2–0)	Stuart (1–3)	None	3,409	21–15	9–9
40	April 23		at No. 5 Miami (FL)	Alex Rodriguez Park at Mark Light Field • Coral Gables, Florida	L 2–17	Ligon (5–2)	Evans (3–5)	None	3,288	21–16	9–10
41	April 24		at No. 5 Miami (FL)	Alex Rodriguez Park at Mark Light Field • Coral Gables, Florida	W 9–4	Corcoran (6–2)	Rosario (1–2)	None	3,299	22–16	10–10
42	April 29		North Carolina A&T	Charles L. Cost Field • Pittsburgh, Pennsylvania	W 10–0	Gilbertson (7–2)	Winebarger (2–6)	None	277	23–16	10–10
43	April 30		North Carolina A&T	Charles L. Cost Field • Pittsburgh, Pennsylvania	L 5–9	Fields (1–1)	Corcoran (6–3)	None	316	23–17	10–10
44	April 30		North Carolina A&T	Charles L. Cost Field • Pittsburgh, Pennsylvania	W 13–9	Devereux (4–1)	Thomas (1–1)	None	317	24–17	10–10

May (3–9)

#	Date	Rank	Opponent	Site/stadium	Score	Win	Loss	Save	Attendance	Overall record	ACC record
45	May 3		Oakland	Charles L. Cost Field • Pittsburgh, Pennsylvania	Canceled						
46	May 4		Oakland	Charles L. Cost Field • Pittsburgh, Pennsylvania	L 4–8	Pidek (2–1)	Devereux (4–2)	Kujawa (1)	263	24–18	10–10
47	May 7		Duke	Charles L. Cost Field • Pittsburgh, Pennsylvania	W 14–4	Gilbertson (8–2)	Santucci (2–2)	None	467	25–18	11–10
48	May 8		Duke	Charles L. Cost Field • Pittsburgh, Pennsylvania	W 3–2	Corcoran (7–3)	Stinson (4–1)	Stuart (6)	336	26–18	12–10
49	May 8		Duke	Charles L. Cost Field • Pittsburgh, Pennsylvania	L 5–15	Fox (3–5)	Evans (3–6)	None	559	26–19	12–11
50	May 10		at West Virginia	Monongalia County Ballpark • Morgantown, West Virginia	L 1–9	Major (2–0)	Bautista (0–1)	None	3,169	26–20	12–11
51	May 13		at No. 16 Notre Dame	Frank Eck Stadium • Notre Dame, Indiana	L 3–8	Bertrand (7–1)	Gilbertson (8–3)	None	896	26–21	12–12
52	May 14		at No. 16 Notre Dame	Frank Eck Stadium • Notre Dame, Indiana	L 1–8	Mercer (1–1)	Corcoran (7–4)	None	647	26–22	12–13
53	May 15		at No. 16 Notre Dame	Frank Eck Stadium • Notre Dame, Indiana	W 5–2	Evans (4–6)	Findlay (5–1)	Stuart (7)	649	27–22	13–13
54	May 17		vs Penn State	PNC Park • Pittsburgh, Pennsylvania	L 9–16	Kohls (2–0)	Demi (0–1)	None	2,582	27–23	13–13
55	May 19		Georgia Tech	Charles L. Cost Field • Pittsburgh, Pennsylvania	L 7–8	Maxwell (1–0)	Stuart (1–4)	None	368	27–24	13–14
56	May 20		Georgia Tech	Charles L. Cost Field • Pittsburgh, Pennsylvania	L 3–19	Grissom, Jr. (3–5)	Corcoran (7–5)	None	391	27–25	13–15
57	May 21		Georgia Tech	Charles L. Cost Field • Pittsburgh, Pennsylvania	L 7–13	Brown (3–1)	Evans (4–7)	Maxwell (4)	434	27–26	13–16

Postseason
ACC Tournament (2–0)

#	Date	Rank	Opponent	Site/stadium	Score	Win	Loss	Save	Attendance	Overall record	ACC Tournament record
58	May 24		Georgia Tech	Truist Field • Charlotte, NC	W 12–6	Gilberston (9–3)	Crawford (0–1)	Bautista (1)	1,895	28–26	1–0
59	May 25		No. 7 Louisville	Truist Field • Charlotte, NC	W 6–5	Stuart (2–4)	Poland (5–4)	None	2,141	29–26	2–0
60	May 28		NC State	Truist Field • Charlotte, NC	L 3–8	Silver (8–1)	Evans (4–8)	None	8,360	29–27	2–1
