= 2022 Virginia Cavaliers baseball team =

American college baseball season

2022 Virginia Cavaliers baseball

NCAA Greenville Regional, 1–2
- Conference: Atlantic Coast Conference
- Record: 39–19 (17–13 ACC)
- Head coach: Brian O'Connor (19th season)
- Assistant coaches: Kevin McMullan (19th season); Matt Kirby (11th season)
- Pitching coach: Drew Dickinson (3rd season)
- Home stadium: Davenport Field

2022 Atlantic Coast Conference baseball standings
	Conf.						Overall
Team	W		L		T	PCT	W		L		T	PCT
Atlantic
No. 12 Louisville ^{x}‍‍‍^{y}	18	–	11	–	1	.617	42	–	21	–	1	.664
No. 6 Notre Dame ‍‍‍^{y}	16	–	11	–	0	.593	41	–	17	–	0	.707
Wake Forest ‍‍‍^{y}	15	–	14	–	1	.517	41	–	19	–	1	.680
Florida State ‍‍‍^{y}	15	–	15	–	0	.500	34	–	25	–	0	.576
NC State ‍‍‍	14	–	15	–	0	.483	36	–	21	–	0	.632
Clemson ‍‍‍	13	–	16	–	0	.448	35	–	23	–	0	.603
Boston College ‍‍‍	5	–	25	–	0	.167	19	–	34	–	0	.358
Coastal
No. 11 Virginia Tech ^{x}‍‍‍^{y}	19	–	9	–	0	.679	45	–	14	–	0	.763
No. 20 Miami (FL) ‍‍‍^{y}	20	–	10	–	0	.667	40	–	19	–	0	.678
Virginia ‍‍‍^{y}	17	–	13	–	0	.567	39	–	19	–	0	.672
No. 14 North Carolina ‍‍‡‍^{y}	15	–	15	–	0	.500	42	–	22	–	0	.656
Georgia Tech ‍‍‍^{y}	15	–	15	–	0	.500	36	–	24	–	0	.600
Pittsburgh ‍‍‍	13	–	16	–	0	.448	29	–	27	–	0	.518
Duke ‍‍‍	10	–	20	–	0	.333	22	–	32	–	0	.407
x – Division champion ‡ – Tournament champion y – Invited to the NCAA tournament As of June 27, 2022; Rankings from D1Baseball

The 2022 Virginia Cavaliers baseball team represented the University of Virginia during the 2022 NCAA Division I baseball season. The Cavaliers played their home games at Davenport Field as a members of the Atlantic Coast Conference. They were led by head coach Brian O'Connor, in his 18th season at Virginia.

They finished 39–19 overall, and 17–13 in ACC play, to finish in third place in the Coastal Division. As the fifth seed in the ACC tournament, they were placed in Pool D with Notre Dame and Florida State. The Cavaliers went 0–2 in pool play and were unable to advance. They received an at-large bid to the NCAA tournament and were the second seed in the Greenville Regional. They won their first game against third seed Coastal Carolina, but then lost to first seed East Carolina. In their elimination game they lost to Coastal Carolina to end their season.

== Background ==
The 2021 team's season was highlighted by qualifying for the College World Series for the first time since the 2015 national championship season. In the College World Series, they finished 1–2. Virginia finished the 2021 season with a 36–27 (18–18 ACC) record.

== Personnel ==
=== Roster ===
2022 Virginia Cavaliers baseball roster
Pitchers: 4 - Jay Woolfolk - Sophomore; 14 – Brandon Neeck – Senior; 15 – Matt Wyatt – Junior; 17 - Jacob Hodorovich - Junior; 25 - Matthew Buchanan - Freshman; 27 - Avery Mabe - Sophomore; 28 – Rece Ritchey – Sophomore; 30 – Nate Savino – Junior; 32 - Jake Berry - Sophomore; 33 – Paul Kosanovich – Graduate; 34 – Dylan Bowers – Graduate; 35 – Will Geerdes – Graduate; 36 – Mason Dillow – Junior; 37 – Brian Gursky – Graduate; 38 - Dean Kampschror - Freshman; 39 – Joseph Miceli – Junior; 40 – Billy Price – Senior; 45 - Luke Schauer - Sophomore	Catchers: 3 - Kyle Teel - Sophomore; 23 - Ethan Anderson - Freshman; Infielders: 2 – Max Cotier – Junior; 6 - Griff O'Ferrall - Sophomore; 8 - Casey Saucke - Freshman; 10 – Tristan Shoemaker – Freshman; 12 - Justin Rubin - Freshman; 16 - Anthony Stephan - Freshman; 22 - Jake Gelof - Sophomore	Outfielders: 9 – Chris Newell – Junior; 11 – Addie Burrow – Sophomore; 31 – Jimmy Sullivan – Senior; Utility: 5 – Drew Hamrock – Senior; 7 – Devin Ortiz – Graduate; 13 – Alex Tappen – Graduate; 18 – Ben Petri – Freshman; 19 – Alex Greene – Sophomore; 21 - Colin Tuft - Freshman

== Schedule ==
2022 Virginia Cavaliers Patriots baseball game log
Regular season (38–17)

February (7–0)
Date	Opponent	Rank	Site/stadium	Score	Win	Loss	Save	TV	Attendance	Overall record	ACC record
Jerry Bryson Classic
February 18	vs. Bellarmine*	No. 21	John Henry Moss Stadium; Boiling Springs, NC	**W** 1–0	Geerdes (1–0)	Pender (0–1)	**Wyatt (1)**		89	1–0	—
February 19	at Gardner–Webb*	No. 21	John Henry Moss Stadium	**W** 7–0	Ortiz (1–0)	Simeone (0–1)	None		503	2–0	—
February 20	vs. NJIT*	No. 21	John Henry Moss Stadium	**W** 8–3	Gursky (1–0)	Gegeckas (0–1)	None		56	3–0	—
February 23	VMI*	No. 21	Davenport Field; Charlottesville, VA	**W** 14–0	Ortiz (2–0)	Kaltreider (0–1)	None	ACCNX	2,293	4–0	—
February 25	Cornell*	No. 21	Davenport Field	**W** 24–9	Savino (1–0)	Yacinich (0–1)	None	ACCNX	2,515	5–0	—
February 26	Cornell*	No. 21	Davenport Field	**W** 17–2	Gursky (2–0)	Edwards (0–1)	None	ACCNX	2,593	6–0	—
February 27	Cornell*	No. 21	Davenport Field	**W** 19–1	Neeck (1–0)	Cushing (0–1)	None	ACCNX	2,505	7–0	—

March (16–2)
Date	Opponent	Rank	Site/stadium	Score	Win	Loss	Save	TV	Attendance	Overall record	ACC record
March 1	William & Mary*	No. 22	Davenport Field	**W** 12–0	**Ortiz (3–0)**	Prairie (0–1)	None	ACCNX	2,189	8–0	—
March 4	Penn State*	No. 22	Davenport Field	**W** 10–1	**Savino (2–0)**	Luensmann (0–2)	None	ACCNX	2,574	9–0	—
March 5	Penn State*	No. 22	Davenport Field	**W** 10–4	**Gursky (3–0)**	Tulio (1–1)	None	ACCNX	3,259	10–0	—
March 6	Penn State*	No. 22	Davenport Field	**W** 13–1	**Neeck (2–0)**	Molsky (0–2)	None	ACCNX	4,459	11–0	—
March 8	George Washington*	No. 19	Davenport Field	**W** 10–2	**Berry (1–0)**	Brus (0–1)	None	ACCNX	2,209	12–0	—
March 11	at Duke	No. 19	Durham Bulls Athletic Park; Durham, NC	**W** 5–0	**Savino (3–0)**	Johnson (1–3)	None	ACCNX	447	13–0	1–0
March 13	at Duke	No. 19	Durham Bulls Athletic Park	**W** 13–1	**Gursky (4–0)**	Fox (1–2)	None	ACCN	918	14–0	2–0
March 13	at Duke	No. 19	Durham Bulls Athletic Park	**L** 6–7	Loper (2–0)	**Ortiz (3–1)**	None	ACCNX	918	14–1	2–1
March 15	Rider*	No. 17	Davenport Field	**W** 14–4	**Buchanan (1–0)**	Sachais (0–1)	None	ACCNX	2,313	15–1	—
March 16	Rider*	No. 17	Davenport Field	**W** 12–3	**Berry (2–0)**	Vitacco (0–1)	None	ACCNX	2,241	16–1	—
March 18	Boston College	No. 17	Davenport Field	**W** 7–6 (10)	**Geerdes (2–0)**	Ryan (1–1)	None	ACCNX	2,744	17–1	3–1
March 19	Boston College	No. 17	Davenport Field	**W** 18–1	**Gursky (5–0)**	Hard (0–2)	None	ACCNX	3,028	18–1	4–1
March 20	Boston College	No. 17	Davenport Field	**W** 16–8	**Woolfolk (1–0)**	Pelio (1–1)	None	ACCNX	3,734	19–1	5–1
March 22	Towson*	No. 8	Davenport Field	**W** 15–3	**Buchanan (2–0)**	Blumenauer (0–4)	None	ACCNX	2,441	20–1	—
March 25	at Wake Forest	No. 8	David F. Couch Ballpark; Winston-Salem, NC	**W** 8–2	**Savino (4–0)**	Lowder (5–1)	None	ACCNX	1,527	21–1	6–1
March 26	at Wake Forest	No. 8	David F. Couch Ballpark	**W** 8–0	**Berry (3–0)**	Hartle (3–3)	None	ACCNX	1,351	22–1	7–1
March 27	at Wake Forest	No. 8	David F. Couch Ballpark	**L** 1–8	McGraw (2–1)	**Neeck (2–1)**	None	ESPNews	1,154	22–2	7–2
March 29	Richmond*	No. 3	Davenport Field	**W** 8–2	**Ortiz (4–1)**	Willitts (1–2)	None	ACCNX	2,240	23–2	—

April (10–9)
Date	Opponent	Rank	Site/stadium	Score	Win	Loss	Save	TV	Attendance	Overall record	ACC record
April 1	No. 21 Georgia Tech	No. 3	Davenport Field	**L** 4–6	Maxwell (2–0)	**Savino (4–1)**	None	ACCNX	3,004	23–3	7–3
April 2	No. 21 Georgia Tech	No. 3	Davenport Field	**W** 13–9	**Kosanovich (1–0)**	Carwile (2–2)	None	ACCNX	3,336	24–3	8–3
April 3	No. 21 Georgia Tech	No. 3	Davenport Field	**W** 18–9	**Berry (4–0)**	Grissom (1–3)	None	ACCNX	5,286	25–3	9–3
April 6	Liberty*	No. 3	Davenport Field	**W** 7–2	**Ortiz (5–1)**	Gibson (3–3)	None	ACCNX	3,106	26–3	—
April 8	at No. 12 Miami (FL)	No. 3	Alex Rodriguez Park; Coral Gables, FL	**L** 2–6	Palmquist (6–1)	**Savino (4–2)**	None	ACCN	3,552	26–4	9–4
April 9	at No. 12 Miami (FL)	No. 3	Alex Rodriguez Park	**L** 4–5	Gallo (1–0)	**Neeck (2–2)**	Walters (10)	ACCNX	3,552	26–5	9–5
April 10	at No. 12 Miami (FL)	No. 3	Alex Rodriguez Park	**L** 5–15	Torres (3–0)	**Berry (4–1)**	None	ACCNX	3,119	26–6	9–6
April 12	Old Dominion*	No. 8	Davenport Field	**L** 2–9	Gertner (2–3)	**Buchanan (2–1)**	None	ACCNX	3,347	26–7	—
April 15	at Pittsburgh	No. 8	Charles L. Cost Field; Pittsburgh, PA	**L** 4–9	Gilbertson (6–2)	**Savino (4–3)**	None	ACCNX	632	26–8	9–7
April 16	at Pittsburgh	No. 8	Charles L. Cost Field	**W** 18–0	**Gursky (6–0)**	Evans (3–4)	None	ACCNX	608	27–8	10–7
April 17	at Pittsburgh	No. 8	Charles L. Cost Field	**L** 1–4	Corcoran (5–2)	**Berry (4–3)**	Stuart (5)	ACCN	398	27–9	10–8
Duel at the Diamond
April 19	at VCU*	No. 11	The Diamond; Richmond, VA	**L** 7–9 (10)	Wilson (4–0)	**Hodorovich** (0–1)	None	ESPN+/WINA	3,392	27–10	—
April 20	Georgetown*	No. 11	Davenport Field	**W** 6–4	**Woolfolk** (2–0)	Redfern (1–1)	**Kosanovich** (1)	ACCNX	2,759	28–10	—
South's Oldest Rivalry
April 22	North Carolina	No. 11	Davenport Field	**W** 4–2	**Woolfolk** (3–0)	Carlson (1–2)	**Neeck** (1)	ACCNX	4,078	29–10	11–8
April 23	North Carolina	No. 11	Davenport Field	**W** 11–7 (10)	**Kosanovich** (2–0)	Gillian (1–3)	None	ACCNX	4,712	30–10	12–8
April 24	North Carolina	No. 11	Davenport Field	**W** 10–3	**Berry** (5–2)	Mott (6–3)	None	ESPNU	4,559	31–10	13–8
April 26	at Old Dominion*	No. 11	Harbor Park; Norfolk, VA	Canceled							
April 27	at George Mason*	No. 11	Davenport Field	**W** 17–7	**Greene** (1–0)	Grant (0–1)	None	ACCN	2,507	32–10	13–8
Commonwealth Clash
April 29	No. 7 Virginia Tech	No. 11	Davenport Field	**L** 2–5	Green (7–1)	**Savino** (4–4)	Firoved (2)	ACCNX	4,873	32–11	13–9
April 30	No. 7 Virginia Tech	No. 11	Davenport Field	**W** 6–3	**Gursky** (7–0)	Hackenber (8–1)	**Neeck** (2)	ACCNX	5,919	33–11	14–9

May (7–4)
Date	Opponent	Rank	Site/stadium	Score	Win	Loss	Save	TV	Attendance	Overall record	ACC record
Commonwealth Clash
May 1	No. 7 Virginia Tech	No. 11	Davenport Field	**L** 5–7	Firoved (2–0)	**Wyatt** (0–1)	None	ACCNX	5,485	33–12	14–10
May 4	VCU*	No. 14	Davenport Field	**W** 12–6	**Kosanovich (3–0)**	Serrano (1–4)	None	ACCNX	2,549	34–12	—
May 11	Longwood*	No. 12	Davenport Field	**W** 8–3	**Bowers** (1–0)	Taylor (1–2)	None	ACCNX	2,952	35–12	—
May 13	Clemson	No. 12	Davenport Field	**W** 11–6	**Buchanan** (3–1)	Anglin (5–5)	**Neeck** (3)	ACCNX	2,860	36–12	15–10
May 15	Clemson	No. 12	Davenport Field	**L** 2–8	Gilbert (4–2)	**Savino** (4–5)	Gordon (1)	ACCNX	3,409	36–13	15–11
May 15	Clemson	No. 12	Davenport Field	**W** 6–3	**Kosanovich** (4–0)	Barlow (1–3)	None	ACCN	3,848	37–13	16–11
May 17	Mount St. Mary's*		Davenport Field	Canceled							
May 19	at No. 10 Louisville	No. 12	Jim Patterson Stadium; Louisville, KY	**L** 1–4	Poland (5–3)	**Gursky** (7–1)	Prosecky (10)	ACCNX	2,287	37–14	16–12
May 20	at No. 10 Louisville	No. 12	Jim Patterson Stadium	**W** 16–7	**Savino** (5–5)	Lohman (1–2)	None	ACCNX	3,078	38–14	17–12
May 21	at No. 10 Louisville	No. 12	Jim Patterson Stadium	**L** 3–11	Liggett (2–0)	**Berry** (5–5)	None	ACCNX	2,695	38–15	17–13

Postseason (1–3)

ACC Tournament (0–2)
Date	Opponent	Seed	Site/stadium	Score	Win	Loss	Save	TV	Attendance	Overall record	ACCT Record
May 25	vs. (9) Florida State	(5) No. 15	Truist Field; Charlotte, NC	**L** 3–13 (8)	Crowell (6–1)	**Gursky** (7–2)	None	ACCRSN	2,141	38–16	0–1
May 27	vs. (4) No. 16 Notre Dame	(5) No. 15	Truist Field	**L** 0–3	Simon (2–0)	**Savino** (5–6)	Tyrell (1)	ACCRSN	2,519	38–17	0–2

Greenville Regional (1–2)
Date	Opponent	Seed	Site/stadium	Score	Win	Loss	Save	TV	Attendance	Overall record	NCAAT record
June 3	vs. (3) Coastal Carolina	(2)	Clark–LeClair Stadium; Greenville, NC	**W** 7–2	**Savino** (6–6)	VanScoter (9–3)	None	ESPN+	4,923	39–17	1–0
June 4	at (1) No. 10 East Carolina	(2)	Clark–LeClair Stadium	**L** 2–4	Mayhue (5–1)	**Gursky** (7–3)	Agnos (2)	ACCN	5,603	39–18	1–1
June 5	vs. (3) Coastal Carolina	(2)	Clark–LeClair Stadium	**L** 6–7	Maniscalco (3–2)	**Wyatt** (0–2)	None	ESPN+	4,929	39–19	1–2

Legend: = Win = Loss = Canceled
* = Non-conference game Bold = Virginia team member
Rankings are based on the team's current ranking in the D1Baseball poll.

== Greenville Regional ==
Greenville Regional Teams
(1) East Carolina Pirates	(2) Virginia Cavaliers	(3) Coastal Carolina Chanticleers	(4) Coppin State Eagles

First Round
1	East Carolina	17
4	Coppin State	1
3	Coastal Carolina	2
2	Virginia	7
Lower round 1
4	Coppin State	8
3	Coastal Carolina	10

Semi-Finals
1	East Carolina	4
2	Virginia	2
Lower final
2	Virginia	6
3	Coastal Carolina	7

Finals
1	East Carolina	1	13
3	Coastal Carolina	9	4

== Rankings ==
Ranking movements Legend: ██ Increase in ranking ██ Decrease in ranking — = Not ranked RV = Received votes ( ) = First-place votes
	Week																		
Poll	Pre	1	2	3	4	5	6	7	8	9	10	11	12	13	14	15	16	17	Final
Coaches'	21	21*	22	19	17	8	3 (1)	3	6	9	8	9	9	10	13	19	19*	19*	RV
Baseball America	5	4	5	5	5	4	3	2	6	8	5	12	11	11	17	25	25*	25*	—
Collegiate Baseball^	24	25	12	7	5	3	2	2	5	16	16	18	18	19	22	24	—	—	—
NCBWA†	17	20	23	17	16	8	3	3	8	11	10	13	13	15	15	21	30	30*	30
D1Baseball	—	—	—	—	19	10	4	3	8	11	11	14	12	12	15	—	—*	—*	—

^ Collegiate Baseball ranked 40 teams in their preseason poll, but only ranked 30 teams weekly during the season.
† NCBWA ranks 30 teams in their preseason poll, but only ranks 25 teams weekly during the season.
* A new poll was not released for this week, so for comparison purposes, the previous week's ranking is inserted in this week's slot.
