= Monte Lee =

American college baseball coach (born 1977)

Current position
- Title: Associate head coach
- Team: Charleston

Biographical details
- Born: February 9, 1977 (age 49); Lugoff, South Carolina, U.S.
- Education: Charleston (Class of 1999)

Playing career
- 1996–1999: Charleston
- Position: Outfielder

Coaching career (HC unless noted)
- 2001–2002: Spartanburg Methodist (asst.)
- 2003–2008: South Carolina (asst.)
- 2009–2015: Charleston
- 2016–2022: Clemson
- 2023–2026: South Carolina (Assc. head coach/Hitting coach)
- 2026: South Carolina (Interim HC)
- 2027-present: Charleston (Assoc. HC)

Head coaching record
- Overall: 528–305
- Tournaments: NCAA: 12–10

Accomplishments and honors

Championships
- NCAA Regional: 2014; CAA: 2015; CAA Tournament: 2014; SoCon: 2012; ACC Tournament: 2016

Monte Wesley Lee (born February 9, 1977) is an American college baseball coach who is a former interim head coach for the South Carolina Gamecocks. He played college baseball for the Charleston Cougars from 1996 to 1999. He then served as the head coach of the College of Charleston Cougars from 2009 to 2015. Under Lee, the Cougars reached four NCAA tournaments, including one NCAA Super Regional. As the head coach of the Clemson Tigers (2016–2022), his teams made four consecutive NCAA Tournament appearances and was nationally ranked in the top 25 in total wins (2016-2022). In addition, the Tigers won the ACC Conference Championship (2016) and regular season title (2018).

In 2022, Lee joined the University of South Carolina baseball staff as the associate head coach, helping lead the team to the Super Regionals in 2023 and 2024.

== Playing career ==
Lee played four seasons of baseball (1996–1999) at College of Charleston. An outfielder, Lee was a career .333 hitter and had 22 home runs and led his team as both the hits and doubles leader. He is still a top record holder for RBI, Home Runs, Stolen Bases, and Games Played. He became the program's first major-league draftee when he was selected by the St. Louis Cardinals following his senior year and played two seasons of minor league baseball with the St. Louis Cardinals and Texas Rangers. Lee was inducted into the College of Charleston Wall of Fame (2004).

== Coaching career ==
Lee began his coaching career with a two-year stint (2001–2002) as an assistant at Spartanburg Methodist, a junior college located in Spartanburg, South Carolina. During Lee's tenure, the program reached an NJCAA Division I World Series and set a single-season win record. Lee then spent six seasons (2003–2008) as an assistant at South Carolina. The Gamecocks qualified for the NCAA tournament in each of Lee's six seasons and also appeared in two College World Series. As the head coach for the College of Charleston, Lee lead the Cougars to four NCAA Tournament appearances (2010, 2012, 2014, 2015). In addition, Lee also lead the Clemson Tigers to four consecutive NCAA Tournament appearances (2016-2019) as their head coach.

=== College of Charleston ===
Lee was hired as the head coach at College of Charleston prior to the start of the 2009 season. In Lee's second season, the Cougars broke the 40-win mark and appeared in their first NCAA tournament in his tenure. At the Myrtle Beach Regional, the Cougars advanced to the regional final with wins over third-seeded NC State and first-seeded Coastal Carolina, but were eliminated with consecutive defeats by Coastal in the championship round. In 2012, the team shared the Southern Conference regular season title and advanced to another NCAA tournament, where it went 1–2. In 2014, Charleston won the conference tournament in their first season in the Colonial Athletic Association. The Cougars then won the Gainesville Regional with a 3–0 record, defeating host Florida and Long Beach State twice. In the Lubbock Super Regional, the Cougars were defeated by Texas Tech in consecutive 1–0 games. In 2015 season, the Cougars won the CAA regular season crown with a 21–3 record, before falling to the UNCW Seahawks in the CAA Championship game. Charleston was selected as a #2 seed in Florida State's Tallahassee Regional, where they went 2–2, finishing second behind the host Seminoles.

In Lee's seven seasons at Charleston, 21 players were selected in the Major League Baseball draft. Pitcher Heath Hembree was taken in the 5th round by the San Francisco Giants in 2010 and reached the major leagues in 2013. A total of six Cougars were taken in that draft, the highest total of Lee's tenure. In his final season at Charleston, the Arizona Diamondbacks selected pitcher Taylor Clarke in the third round, making him the program's highest ever selection.

=== Clemson ===
On June 18, 2015, Clemson hired Lee to be their 28th head coach in program history; he became only the third head baseball coach at Clemson since 1958.

Monte Lee guided the 2016 Tigers to an ACC baseball tournament title in his first season, defeating the defending ACC Champion Florida State Seminoles in a marathon game by a score of 18–13 at the Durham Bulls Athletic Park in Durham, NC. The win produced the program's first conference title in ten years and Lee's first Clemson team captured the program's 10th conference tournament title and 15th overall ACC championship - both league records. Lee also became the third consecutive Clemson head coach to win the ACC in his first season, joining Bill Wilhelm (1958) and Jack Leggett (1994). The Tigers' 44 victories in 2016 are the second-most victories by a first-year head coach in Clemson history. A strong finish to the season propelled the Tigers to their 41st appearance and the #7 overall national seed to the NCAA tournament.

In 2022, Lee earned his 500th career victory. The Tigers defeated College of Charleston on March 29 to give Lee the victory. At the end of the season Lee was fired as head coach after failing to make the NCAA tournament. It was the second consecutive season that Clemson did not qualify for the tournament.

=== Return to South Carolina ===
On August 18, 2022, Lee returned to South Carolina as the team's associate head coach and recruiting coordinator, helping lead the South Carolina Gamecocks back to post-season play by advancing to Super Regionals.

Upon the firing of head coach Mark Kingston on June 3, 2024, Lee was named the interim head coach for South Carolina. On June 11, 2024, Lee was given an extension and raise when Paul Mainieri was named head coach of the program. He was also moved to associate head coach and as the hitting coach. On March 21, 2026, Mainieri stepped down as head coach of the Gamecocks, and Lee was promoted to interim head coach the same day. The team would lose 2-1 to Arkansas in extra innings the day of his promotion. He would lead the team to a 10-24 record in the last 34 games of the season, leading to a season score of 22-35: This led to him and the assistants Terry Rooney and John Hendry being fired on May 22, 2026.

== Head coaching record ==
The following is a table of Lee's yearly records as a collegiate head baseball coach.

Record table
Season	Team	Overall	Conference	Standing	Postseason
College of Charleston (Southern Conference) (2009–2013)
2009	College of Charleston	35–22	17–13	5th	
2010	College of Charleston	44–19	22–8	2nd	NCAA Regional
2011	College of Charleston	39–22	18–12	T–3rd	
2012	College of Charleston	38–22	21–9	T–1st	NCAA Regional
2013	College of Charleston	31–26	18–11	T–2nd	
College of Charleston:			96–53 (.644)		
College of Charleston (Colonial Athletic Association) (2014–2015)
2014	College of Charleston	44–19	15–6	2nd	NCAA Super Regional
2015	College of Charleston	45–15	21–3	1st	NCAA Regional
College of Charleston:		276–145 (.656)	36–9 (.800)		
Clemson (Atlantic Coast Conference) (2016–2022)
2016	Clemson	44–20	16–14	4th (Atlantic)	NCAA Regional
2017	Clemson	42–21	17–13	3rd (Atlantic)	NCAA Regional
2018	Clemson	47–16	22–8	1st (Atlantic)	NCAA Regional
2019	Clemson	35–26	15–15	4th (Atlantic)	NCAA Regional
2020	Clemson	14–3	3–0		Season canceled due to COVID-19
2021	Clemson	25–27	16–20	5th (Atlantic)	
2022	Clemson	35–23	13–16	6th (Atlantic)	
Clemson:		242–136 (.640)	102–86 (.543)		
South Carolina Gamecocks (Southeastern Conference) (2026)
2026	South Carolina	10–24	7–19	15th	
South Carolina:		10–24 (.294)	7–19 (.269)		
Total:		528–305 (.634)			
National champion Postseason invitational champion Conference regular season champion Conference regular season and conference tournament champion Division regular season champion Division regular season and conference tournament champion Conference tournament champion
