= 2022 Louisville Cardinals baseball team =

American college baseball season

2022 Louisville Cardinals baseball

NCAA tournament, Louisville Regional
- Conference: Atlantic Coast Conference

Ranking
- Coaches: No. 12
- Record: 42–21–1 (18–11–1 ACC)
- Head coach: Dan McDonnell (16th season)
- Assistant coaches: Roger Williams (16th season); Eric Snider (8th season); Adam Vrable (8th season)
- Home stadium: Jim Patterson Stadium

2022 Atlantic Coast Conference baseball standings
| | Conf. | | | | | | Overall |
| Team | W | | L | | T | PCT | W | | L | | T | PCT |
|---|---|---|---|---|---|---|---|---|---|---|---|---|
Atlantic
| No. 12 Louisville ^{x}‍‍‍^{y} | 18 | – | 11 | – | 1 | .617 | 42 | – | 21 | – | 1 | .664 |
| No. 6 Notre Dame ‍‍‍^{y} | 16 | – | 11 | – | 0 | .593 | 41 | – | 17 | – | 0 | .707 |
| Wake Forest ‍‍‍^{y} | 15 | – | 14 | – | 1 | .517 | 41 | – | 19 | – | 1 | .680 |
| Florida State ‍‍‍^{y} | 15 | – | 15 | – | 0 | .500 | 34 | – | 25 | – | 0 | .576 |
| NC State ‍‍‍ | 14 | – | 15 | – | 0 | .483 | 36 | – | 21 | – | 0 | .632 |
| Clemson ‍‍‍ | 13 | – | 16 | – | 0 | .448 | 35 | – | 23 | – | 0 | .603 |
| Boston College ‍‍‍ | 5 | – | 25 | – | 0 | .167 | 19 | – | 34 | – | 0 | .358 |
Coastal
| No. 11 Virginia Tech ^{x}‍‍‍^{y} | 19 | – | 9 | – | 0 | .679 | 45 | – | 14 | – | 0 | .763 |
| No. 20 Miami (FL) ‍‍‍^{y} | 20 | – | 10 | – | 0 | .667 | 40 | – | 19 | – | 0 | .678 |
| Virginia ‍‍‍^{y} | 17 | – | 13 | – | 0 | .567 | 39 | – | 19 | – | 0 | .672 |
| No. 14 North Carolina ‍‍‡‍^{y} | 15 | – | 15 | – | 0 | .500 | 42 | – | 22 | – | 0 | .656 |
| Georgia Tech ‍‍‍^{y} | 15 | – | 15 | – | 0 | .500 | 36 | – | 24 | – | 0 | .600 |
| Pittsburgh ‍‍‍ | 13 | – | 16 | – | 0 | .448 | 29 | – | 27 | – | 0 | .518 |
| Duke ‍‍‍ | 10 | – | 20 | – | 0 | .333 | 22 | – | 32 | – | 0 | .407 |
x – Division champion ‡ – Tournament champion y – Invited to the NCAA tournament As of June 27, 2022; Rankings from D1Baseball

The 2022 Louisville Cardinals baseball team represented the University of Louisville during the 2022 NCAA Division I baseball season. The Cardinals played their home games at Jim Patterson Stadium as a member of the Atlantic Coast Conference. They were led by head coach Dan McDonnell, in his sixteenth year at Louisville.

After missing the NCAA Tournament in 2021, the Cardinals received the 12th seed in the NCAA tournament and were selected to host an NCAA Regional. The Cardinals advanced to the NCAA Super Regional where they fell to Texas A&M.

== Previous season ==
The 2021 Louisville Cardinals baseball team finished the season 28–22, missing the NCAA Tournament for the first time since 2011.

=== 2021 MLB draft ===
The Cardinals had three players drafted in the 2021 MLB draft. Catcher Henry Davis was chosen as the first overall pick.

| Player | Position | Round | Overall | MLB Team |
|---|---|---|---|---|
| Henry Davis | Catcher | 1 | 1 | Pittsburgh Pirates |
| Alex Binelas | Third baseman | 3 | 86 | Oakland Athletics |
| Cooper Bowman | Second baseman | 4 | 122 | New York Yankees |

== Rankings ==
Ranking movements Legend: ██ Increase in ranking ██ Decrease in ranking — = Not ranked
| | Week | | | | | | | | | | | | | | | | | | | |
| Poll | Pre | 1 | 2 | 3 | 4 | 5 | 6 | 7 | 8 | 9 | 10 | 11 | 12 | 13 | 14 | 15 | 16 | 17 | 18 | Final |
|---|---|---|---|---|---|---|---|---|---|---|---|---|---|---|---|---|---|---|---|---|
| Coaches' | — | —* | — | — | — | 22 | 14 | 14 | 11 | 18 | 17 | 10 | 8 | 9 | 6 | 9 | 9* | 9* | 9* | 14 |
| Baseball America | — | — | — | — | — | 15 | 8 | 11 | 9 | 13 | 12 | 7 | 7 | 14 | 6 | 7 | 7* | 7* | 7* | 12 |
| Collegiate Baseball^ | 26 | — | — | — | — | 15 | 5 | 4 | 3 | 11 | 10 | 5 | 6 | 9 | 7 | 7 | 6 | 12 | 12* | 12 |
| NCBWA† | — | — | — | — | — | 24 | 15 | 15 | 11 | 17 | 17 | 14 | 7 | 7 | 7 | 12 | 11 | 11* | 11* | 12 |
| D1Baseball | — | — | — | — | — | 18 | 11 | 12 | 9 | 16 | 16 | 10 | 7 | 10 | 7 | 8 | 8* | 8* | 8* | 12 |

^ Collegiate Baseball ranked 40 teams in their preseason poll, but only ranked 30 teams weekly during the season.
† NCBWA ranks 30 teams in their preseason poll, but only ranks 25 teams weekly during the season.
* A new poll was not released for this week, so for comparison purposes, the previous week's ranking is inserted in this week's slot.
