= The Louisville Cardinal =

Student newspaper of the University of Louisville

- Type: Student newspaper
- School: University of Louisville
- Editor-in-chief: Vincent Porco
- Founded: 1926
- Headquarters: Louisville, Kentucky
- Website: louisvillecardinal.com

The Louisville Cardinal is the independent weekly student newspaper of the University of Louisville in Louisville, Kentucky, US. It is published every Tuesday during the academic year and once in late April for distribution throughout the summer. The Louisville Cardinal was founded in 1926 and has maintained financial and editorial independence since 1980.

== Archives ==
The Louisville Cardinal keeps a physical archive of past issues in their campus office at the University of Louisville, located in the Houchens Building. A digital archive was created in 2014 and includes all subsequent issues.

In 2020, the University of Louisville's Archive and Special Collections Department had digitized all issues of The Louisville Cardinal dating back to 1926 when the newspaper was founded. The library's archive now includes all issues up to 2021.

The newspaper archives are as follows:

- 1925–2021 issues via UofL Library
- 2014–present issues via The Louisville Cardinal

== Other publications ==
In 2013, The Louisville Cardinal published a commemorative book for the NCAA Division I Men's Basketball Championship title. Unbreakable: Louisville's Inspired Championship Run features interviews, photography, and analysis produced by student reporters during the 2013 basketball season. The book also features writing about the University of Louisville's women's basketball team, who made it to the Final Four in the same season.

== See also ==
- List of student newspapers
