= Vance Honeycutt =

American baseball player (born 2003)

Baltimore Orioles
- Center fielder
- Born: May 17, 2003 (age 23); Salisbury, North Carolina, U.S.
- Bats: Right Throws: Right
- Stats at Baseball Reference

Robert Vance Honeycutt IV (born May 17, 2003) is an American professional baseball outfielder in the Baltimore Orioles organization.

== Early life ==
Honeycutt grew up in Salisbury, North Carolina and attended Salisbury High School, where he played baseball and was the starting quarterback on the football team. He committed to play college baseball at the University of North Carolina during his sophomore year. Honeycutt passed for 11 touchdowns and rushed for 19 during his senior football season as Salisbury won the NCHSAA 2A state championship. Honeycutt was selected by the San Francisco Giants in the 20th round of the 2021 Major League Baseball draft, but he opted not to sign and enroll at North Carolina.

== College career ==
=== Freshman ===
As a freshman for the North Carolina Tar Heels, Honeycutt batted .296 with a school-record 25 home runs, 57 runs batted in (RBI), and 29 stolen bases. He was the first player in UNC history to have 20 home runs and 20 stolen bases in the same season and was named third-team All-Atlantic Coast Conference (ACC). Honeycutt was named the most valuable player of the 2022 ACC tournament after hitting .400 with four home runs and 10 RBI. After the season, he was selected for the United States collegiate national team.

=== Sophomore ===
Heading into his sophomore season, Honeycutt was picked as preseason ACC Player of the Year. On the season, Honeycutt's power numbers dipped slightly, hitting .257 with a slugging percentage of .418, but he improved his on-base percentage to .492. Additionally, Honeycutt continued to showcase his defensive skills, making numerous difficult catches throughout the season, en route to another third-team All-ACC selection and the ACC's Defensive Player of the Year Award. A back injury caused Honeycutt to miss the final ten games of the season, including the postseason. The Tar Heels were eliminated in the regional round of the NCAA tournament.

=== Junior ===
Firmly entrenched as the Tar Heels' star centerfielder, Honeycutt's third season in Chapel Hill was his best. Hitting .318 on the year, with 28 home runs (breaking his own single-season school record), 70 RBI, and an OPS of 1.124, Honeycutt's offense and defensive play powered the Tar Heels to an ACC regular-season championship and an appearance in the College World Series. He broke the school's all-time home run record, finishing his Tar Heel career with 65 home runs, and won his second consecutive ACC DPOY award. His performance in what was likely his final season as a Tar Heel positioned him firmly as a top prospect in the 2024 MLB draft.

== Professional career ==
Honeycutt was drafted by the Baltimore Orioles in the first round, with the 22nd overall pick, of the 2024 Major League Baseball draft. On August 1, 2024, Honeycutt signed with the Orioles on a $4 million contract.

Honeycutt was assigned to the Delmarva Shorebirds to make his professional debut and also played with the Aberdeen IronBirds. Across 13 games with both teams, he batted .176 with five RBI. Honeycutt returned to Aberdeen for the entirety of the 2025 season and played 101 games in which he slashed .171/.284/.275 with five home runs, 24 RBI, 32 stolen bases and 178 strikeouts over 374 at-bats.

In Grapefruit League competition spring training leading to the 2026 season, Honeycutt hit four home runs in his first four plate appearances, one of them going 471 feet. The MLB record for home runs in consecutive at-bats in regular-season play is also four. Honeycutt was assigned to the Frederick Keys to start the 2026 season. In August, he was promoted to the Chesapeake Baysox. Across 83 games between both teams, Honeycutt hit .208 with 15 home runs and 44 RBI.

== Personal life ==
Honeycutt's father, Bob, also played baseball at UNC. His mother, Leah Ann, ran track for the Tar Heels. Honeycutt's two older sisters both played soccer for UNC Charlotte.
