= Truist Field =

Baseball stadium in Charlotte, North Carolina

- Uptown Ballpark

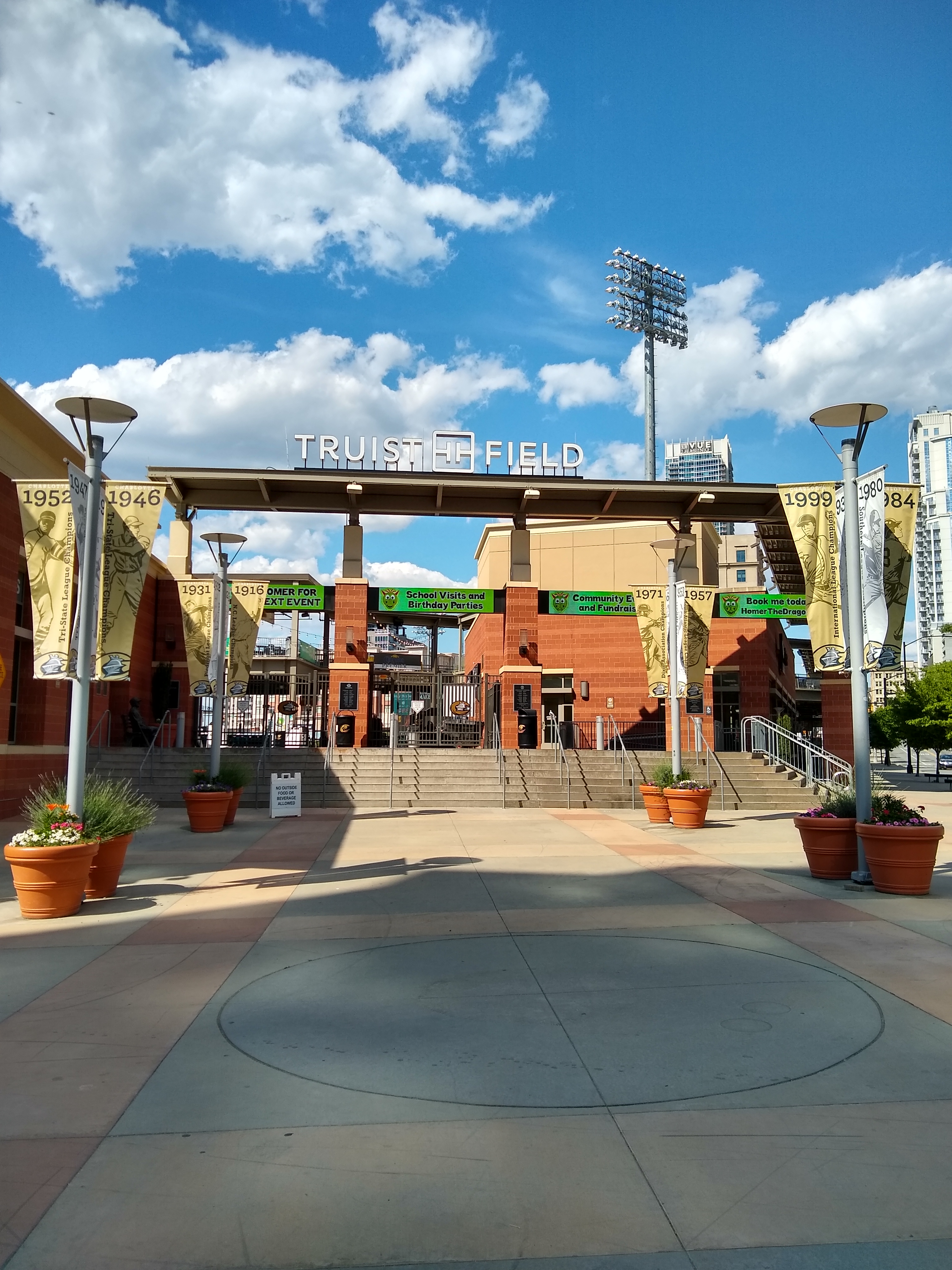
- Truist Field (Formerly BB&T Ballpark)

- Location within North Carolina Location within the United States
- Interactive map of Truist Field
- Former names: BB&T Ballpark (2014–2019)
- Address: 324 South Mint Street; Charlotte, North Carolina; United States
- Coordinates: 35.227988°N 80.849011°W
- Owner: Mecklenburg County
- Operator: Knights Baseball, LLC
- Capacity: 10,200
- Surface: Grass
- Record attendance: 11,355 (August 8, 2026, Baseball)
- Field size: Left field: 330 feet (100 m); Center field: 400 feet (120 m); Right Field: 315 feet (96 m)
- Public transit: 3rd Street/Convention Center; Mint Street

Construction
- Groundbreaking: September 14, 2012
- Opened: March 22, 2014
- Cost: $54 million
- Architect: Odell Associates in association with BallparkDesignAssociates
- Services engineers: Smith Seckman Reid, Inc.
- General contractor: Barton Malow/R. J. Leeper/Rodgers

Tenant
- Charlotte Knights (IL/AAAE) 2014–present

Truist Field is a baseball stadium in Charlotte, North Carolina, United States. The Uptown-area stadium hosts the Charlotte Knights, a Triple-A Minor League Baseball team in the International League. It is also the third sports building to be built in Uptown, after Bank of America Stadium (home of the NFL's Carolina Panthers and MLS's Charlotte FC) and Spectrum Center (home of the NBA's Charlotte Hornets).

== History ==
An Uptown stadium for the Knights had been a long-running saga in Charlotte, occasionally the subject of contentious debate. Since the dawn of the new millennium, the Knights had consistently had the worst attendance in the International League. Their stadium at the time, Knights Stadium, was located in Fort Mill, South Carolina, 30 minutes south of Uptown Charlotte. Many fans were unwilling to brave the traffic on Interstate 77 to get there.

The project had been repeatedly blocked by Jerry Reese, a Charlotte lawyer who claimed the land swap was illegal. Reese had ambitions to move a Major League Baseball team to Charlotte and viewed a Triple-A sized stadium for the Knights as a detriment.

In August 2006 the stadium became the source of more debate, as Mecklenburg County commission chairman Parks Helms said he would stall an arts project until the Charlotte City Council looked at a proposal he backed to bring baseball to Uptown.

Furthermore, it could expand the Atlantic Coast Conference's plans to return the Atlantic Coast Conference baseball tournament to Charlotte. The ACC tournament had been held at Knights Stadium until the NCAA's ban on South Carolina having predetermined championships took effect because of NAACP pressure in relation to the state's display of the Confederate flag on the State House grounds.

The former site of the Piedmont and Northern Railway's Interurban Depot, which was razed before 1970 and had since been used for car parking and storage, was chosen as the location for the new ballpark in Uptown's Third Ward. Multiple new mid-rise hotels are expected to open in the area around the new stadium, along with restaurants and retail.

The first event held at the ballpark was a media softball game, which took place on March 22, 2014. The first Knights game took place on April 11, 2014.

The stadium hosted the 2016 Triple-A All-Star Game in which the International League All-Stars defeated the Pacific Coast League All-Stars, 4–2.

On January 31, 2018, Charlotte Knights Chief Operating Officer Dan Rajkowski announced that the Knights will host a total of six college baseball games during the upcoming season during the Sunbelt Rentals Collegiate Baseball Series. This is the most in the ballpark's history.

Truist Field hosted the 2021 Atlantic Coast Conference baseball tournament, May 25–30, 2021. The 2020 games were scheduled to be held at Truist Field but were cancelled due to the COVID-19 pandemic. Truist Field and Durham Bulls Athletic Park now alternate as the site of the ACC tournament, with Charlotte hosting in even-numbered years.

In March 2023, the Paper Mill Pub opened at the ballpark as a year-round bar offering lunch and dinner.

On January 13, 2024, Trust Field will host the Queen City Outdoor Classic hockey game between the Charlotte Checkers and Rochester Americans. This will be the Checkers' first outdoor game.

== Naming rights ==
On April 23, 2012, it was announced that BB&T, a bank based in Winston-Salem, acquired the naming rights for the new ballpark. The terms of the deal were undisclosed and the ballpark was afterwards officially referred to as BB&T Ballpark.

In 2019, BB&T merged with Atlanta-based SunTrust to form Truist, based in Charlotte; on June 11, 2020, it was announced that new name would be Truist Field.

== Features ==
The stadium features a two-level club with skyline views as well as a VIP, climate-controlled club with full-service bar. In total, there are 975 club seats and 22 luxury suites at the ballpark.

As a hitter-friendly park, the ballpark had the highest home-run factor in the International League and Triple-A from 2014 to 2016. Its hit factor was the highest in the league and the fifth-highest in Triple-A. Knights general manager Scotty Smith said that due to the limited lot size, the foul lines are a few feet shorter than minor-league guidelines.

== Gallery ==
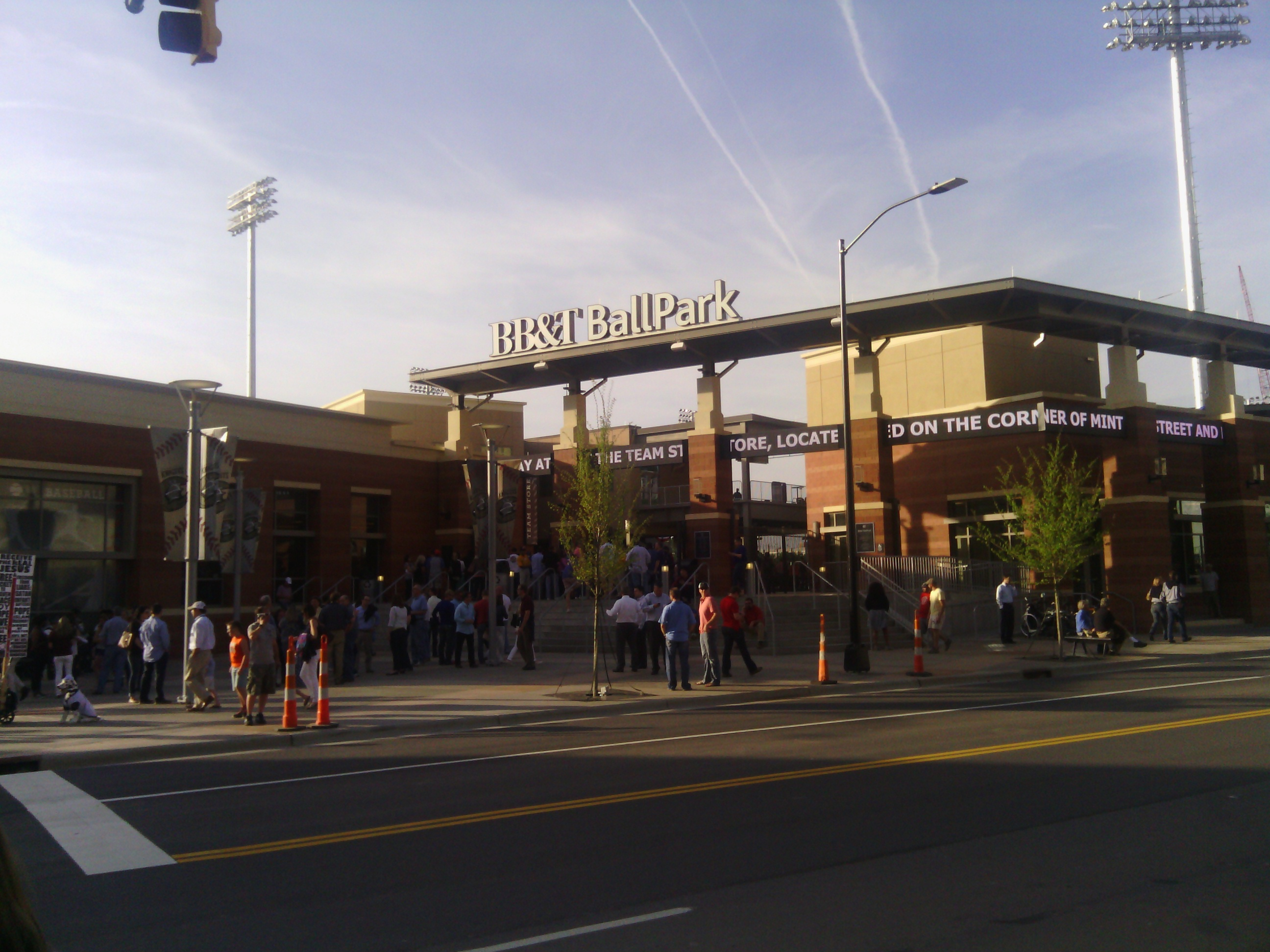
The stadium before a game

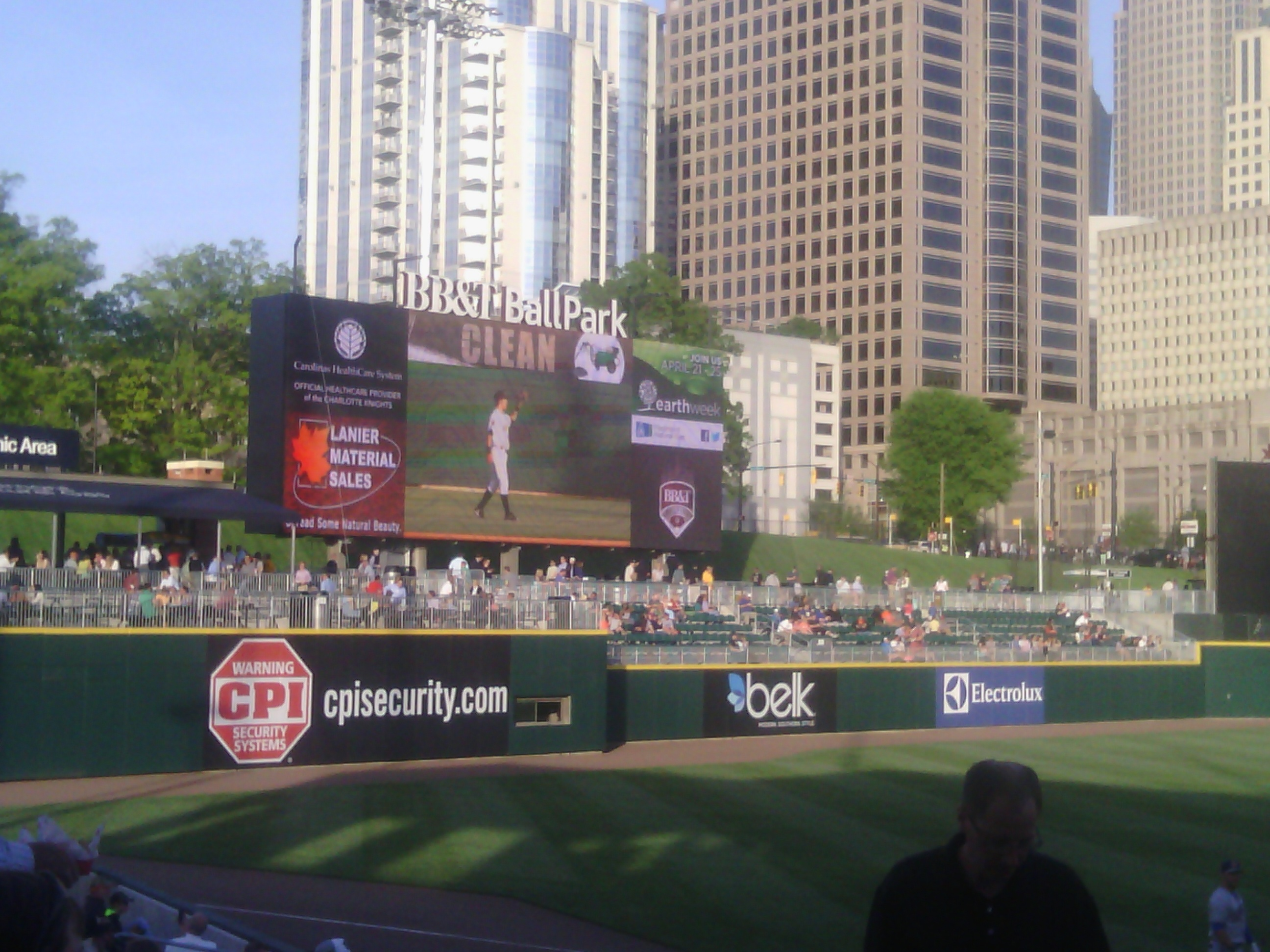
The left-field scoreboard

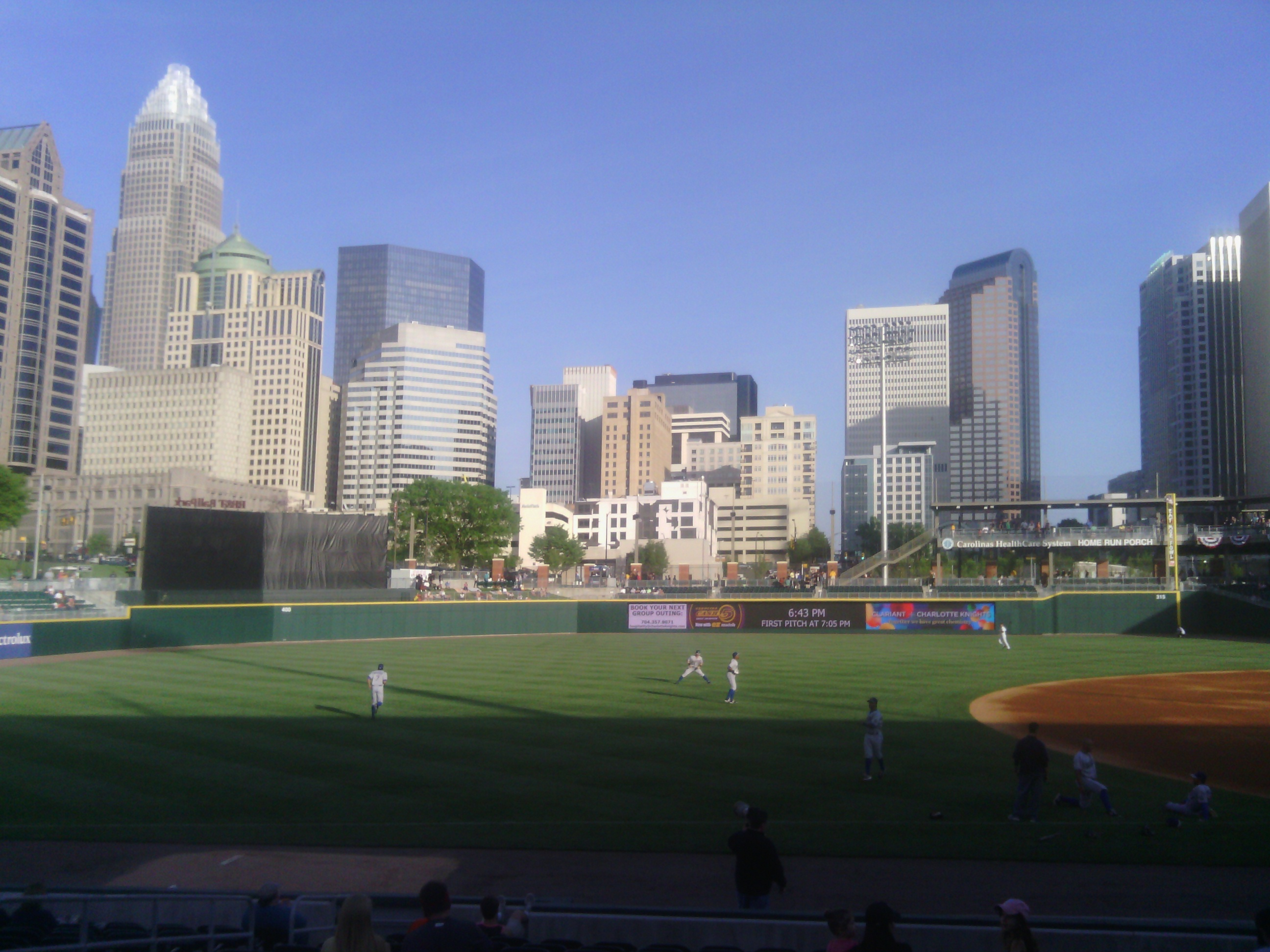
The view from left field, with the Charlotte skyline
