= Metro Conference =

U.S. college athletic conference

- Formerly: Metro Atlantic Athletic Conference (MAAC, 1980–2026)
- Association: NCAA
- Founded: 1980; 46 years ago
- Commissioner: Travis Tellitocci (since 2023)
- Sports fielded: 25; men's: 11; women's: 13; coeducational: 1
- Division: Division I
- Subdivision: Non-football
- No. of teams: 13 (14 in 2027)
- Headquarters: Edison, New Jersey
- Region: Northeastern United States
- Broadcaster: ESPN
- Website: themetro.org

Locations

The Metro Conference (Metro), formerly known as the Metro Atlantic Athletic Conference (MAAC) from 1980 to 2026, is a collegiate athletic conference affiliated with NCAA Division I. Its current 13 full members are located in five Northeastern states: Connecticut, Maryland, Massachusetts, New Jersey, and New York.

Members are all relatively small private institutions, a majority Catholic or formerly Catholic, with the only exceptions being two secular institutions: Rider University and Quinnipiac University.

The Metro currently sponsors 25 sports and has 17 associate member institutions.

== History ==
Metro Conference
Locations of Metro members: full, future full, departing full

The conference was founded in 1980 by six charter members: the U.S. Military Academy, Fairfield University, Fordham University, Iona College, Manhattan College, and Saint Peter's College. Competition officially began the next year, in the sports of men's cross-country and men's soccer.

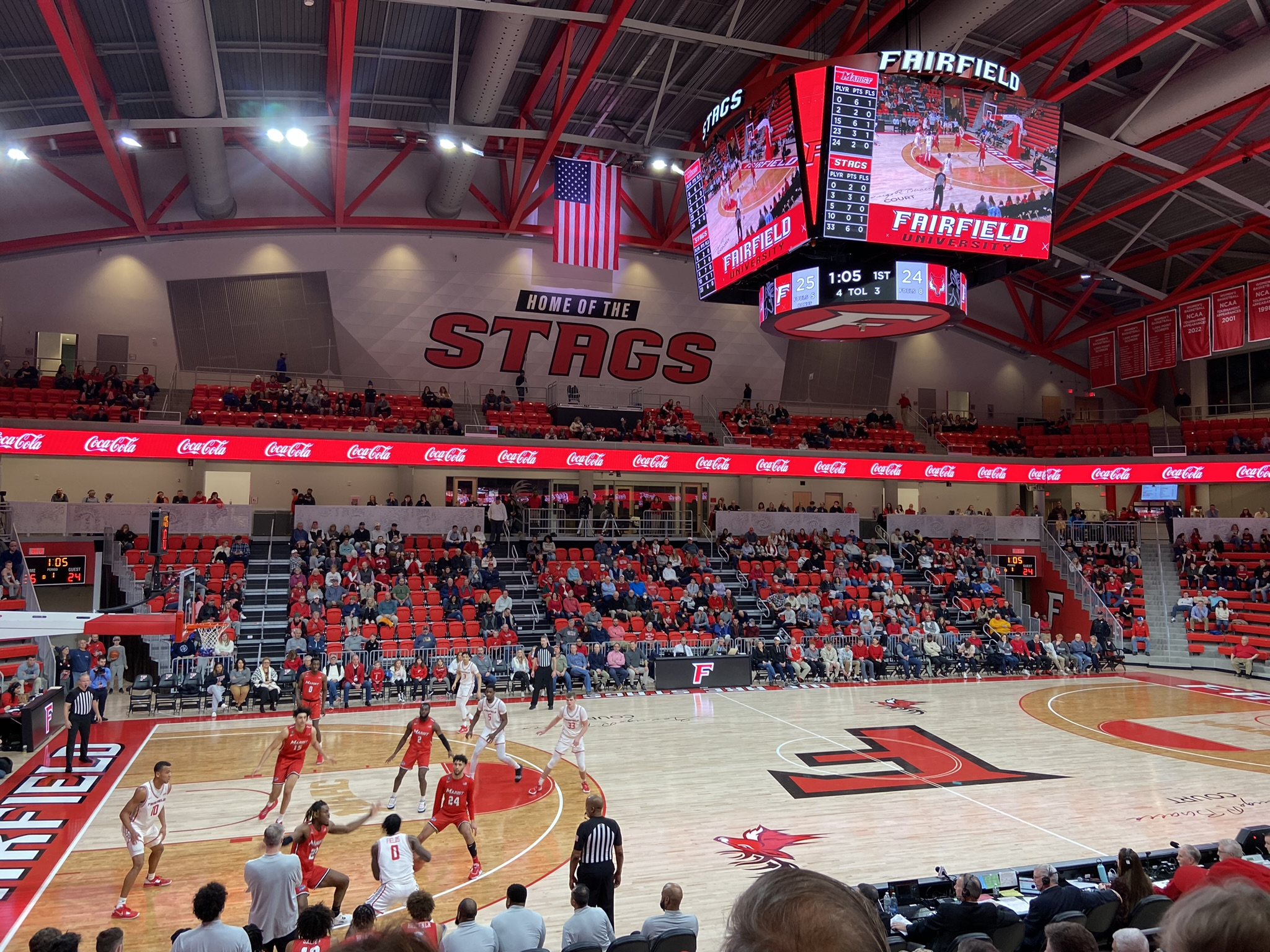
MAAC men's basketball game between Marist College and Fairfield University

Competition in men's and women's basketball began in the 1981–1982 season. In 1982, Saint Peter's was the first women's team to represent the MAAC in the NCAA women's basketball tournament. In 1984, the Metro received an automatic bid to the NCAA men's basketball tournament, where Iona was the first team to represent the MAAC on the men's side.

The conference currently possesses 15 automatic bids to NCAA championships. In 2012–13, the MAAC became eligible for its 15th NCAA championship automatic bid when women's rowing fulfilled the qualifying requirements.

The league added football in 1993, but discontinued it following the 2007 season.

From 1997 to 2003, the MAAC sponsored ice hockey. At that time, the hockey league split from the MAAC and changed its name to the Atlantic Hockey Association (now Atlantic Hockey America after its 2024 merger with College Hockey America). Also, Marist University and Rider University moved the majority of their intercollegiate athletic programs to the MAAC in 1997 with the intent that the MAAC would enhance media exposure and competition for their men's and women's Division I basketball programs.

In 2011, the conference launched MAAC.TV, the league's first broadband network.

In March 2012, for the first time in 16 years, the MAAC had two teams advance to the NCAA Division I men's basketball tournament, with Loyola earning the league's automatic bid and Iona garnering an at-large bid.

In July 2013, Quinnipiac University and Monmouth University joined the MAAC to replace Loyola University Maryland, departing to the Patriot League. Field hockey was added for the 2013–14 academic year. However, field hockey was dropped after the 2018 season. The MAAC field hockey league was effectively taken over by the Northeast Conference (NEC), which reinstated the sport the following year. The conference decided to no longer host a conference championship for men's rowing after the 2016 season, which is governed by the Intercollegiate Rowing Association.

In 2022, Monmouth left the MAAC to join the Colonial Athletic Association, now known as the Coastal Athletic Association. The MAAC responded by entering into negotiations with Mount St. Mary's University, a full but non-football NEC member. ESPN reported on April 27, 2022 that the addition of Mount St. Mary's for 2022–23 and beyond would be finalized in early May. The last of these developments came shortly after the MAAC's greatest success in men's basketball, when Saint Peter's became the first 15-seed ever to reach an NCAA regional final, losing there to eventual national runner-up No. 8 North Carolina. Mount St. Mary's would be confirmed as Monmouth's replacement on May 2.

Also in 2022, four schools that were already MAAC affiliates added men's lacrosse to their MAAC memberships. All were full members of conferences that dropped the sport following the addition of men's lacrosse by the Atlantic 10 Conference. At the time, LIU, Sacred Heart, and Wagner were all members of the Northeast Conference (now officially NEC), and VMI was and still is a member of the Southern Conference. LIU is the only one of the four that had not previously housed men's lacrosse in the MAAC.

Merrimack College and Sacred Heart University joined the conference for the 2024-25 season.

=== Athletic and academic success ===
Over the conference's history, MAAC teams have achieved national acclaim in many sports. In the summer of 2002, the Marist men's varsity eight boat advanced to the semifinals of the Temple Challenge Cup at the Henley Royal Regatta. In 2007, the Marist women's basketball team advanced to the Sweet 16 of the NCAA Division I women's basketball tournament. The Red Foxes have recorded five NCAA wins since their run in 2007. In the fall of 2011, the Iona men's cross country team finished tied for ninth place at the NCAA Championship race, extending the Gaels' streak to 10 straight Top 10 national finishes. During the 2022 NCAA Division I men's basketball tournament, the Saint Peter's Peacocks became the first 15 seed to reach the Elite Eight. With an overall record of 22–12, Saint Peter's had the best NCAA postseason run with the most wins in a single NCAA Tournament by any MAAC program (men or women) in the conference's 41-year history. In basketball, MAAC teams have made a total of 80 NIT appearances and 50 NCAA basketball tournament appearances.

Notable MAAC student athletes include Mary Beth Riley, a 1991 graduate of Canisius, who was the first recipient of the NCAA Woman of the Year Award and Erin Whalen, a member of the Iona women's rowing team who in the fall of 1998 was awarded one of the nation's 32 Rhodes Scholarships for academic achievement and civic leadership.

=== 2023–present: New leadership; rebranding to the Metro ===
On August 17, 2022, MAAC commissioner Rich Ensor announced his intent to retire after the 2022–23 season after serving in the role since 1988. On February 7, 2023, the MAAC announced that Travis Tellitocci, previously with the Ohio Valley Conference as its assistant commissioner for football, basketball and officiating, would replace Ensor as just the fourth commissioner in MAAC history.

On May 28, 2026, the MAAC announced its intention to rebrand to The Metro Conference, effective July 1, 2026, in an effort to eliminate confusion with the Mid-American Conference's acronym.

On October 22, 2026, the Metro announced that Le Moyne College had accepted an invitation to join the conference on July 1, 2027.

On November 13, 2026, the Metro announced that Stonehill College had accepted an invitation to join the conference on July 1, 2027.

== Member institutions ==
=== Current ===
==== Current full members ====
The Metro currently has thirteen full member institutions; all are private schools. Of these, all but Quinnipiac, Rider, and Marist are Catholic, though Marist is formerly Catholic.

Institution	Location	Founded	Type	Enrollment	Endowment (millions)	Nickname	Joined (Note: Represents the calendar year when fall sports competition begins.)	Colors
Canisius University	Buffalo, New York	1870	Catholic (Jesuit)	3,244	$133.9	Golden Griffins	1989	
Fairfield University	Fairfield, Connecticut	1942	Catholic (Jesuit)	5,273	$502.7	Stags	1981	
Iona University	New Rochelle, New York	1940	Catholic (Christian; Brothers)	3,926	$143.7	Gaels	1981	
Manhattan University	Riverdale, New York	1853	Catholic (Lasallian)	4,132	$100.6	Jaspers & Lady Jaspers	1981	
Marist University	Poughkeepsie, New York	1929	Nonsectarian (Note: Formerly part of the Marist Brothers of the Schools until 2003.)	6,624	$408.0	Red Foxes	1997	
Merrimack College	North Andover, Massachusetts	1947	Catholic (Augustinian)	5,700	$97.4 (Note: Current accurate amount in endowment is $97,400,667.)	Warriors	2024	
Mount St. Mary's University	Emmitsburg, Maryland (Note: The Mount St. Mary's campus has an Emmitsburg mailing address, but lies in unincorporated Frederick County.)	1808	Catholic (Archdiocese of Baltimore)	1,889	$47.605	Mountaineers	2022	
Niagara University	Lewiston, New York (Note: Mailing address is "Niagara University, New York".)	1856	Catholic (Vincentian)	3,765	$102.4	Purple Eagles	1989	
Quinnipiac University	Hamden, Connecticut	1929	Nonsectarian	10,207	$753.872	Bobcats	2013	
Rider University	Lawrenceville, New Jersey	1865	Nonsectarian	4,825	$64.3	Broncs	1997	
Sacred Heart University	Fairfield, Connecticut	1963	Catholic (Note: Sacred Heart was founded by the bishop of the Roman Catholic Diocese of Bridgeport, but has been led and primarily staffed by Catholic laity from its creation.) (Diocese of Bridgeport)	5,974	$246.0	Pioneers	2024	
Saint Peter's University	Jersey City, New Jersey	1872	Catholic (Jesuit)	3,452	$43.6	Peacocks	1981	
Siena University	Loudonville, New York	1937	Catholic (Franciscan)	3,224	$135.3	Saints	1989	

==== Future full members ====
Institution	Location	Founded	Type	Enrollment	Endowment (millions, 2025)	Nickname	Joining (Note: Represents the calendar year when fall sports competition begins.)	Colors	Current conference
Le Moyne College	DeWitt, New York (Note: The campus has a Syracuse mailing address, but almost entirely lies within the adjacent town of DeWitt.)	1946	Catholic (Jesuit)	3,409	$289.8	Dolphins	2027		NEC
Stonehill College	Easton, Massachusetts	1948	Catholic (Holy Cross)	2,479	$326.5	Skyhawks	2027		NEC

==== Current associate members ====
Of the Metro's ten current affiliate members, only two are Catholic. Drake, Jacksonville, LIU, Robert Morris, and Stetson are nonsectarian and Wagner College is Lutheran. There are also two public institutions, the University at Albany and the Virginia Military Institute.

Institution	Location	Founded	Type	Enrollment	Nickname	Joined (Note: Represents the calendar year when fall sports competition begins.)	Metro sport(s)	Primary conference
University at Albany, SUNY (Note: Also known as the State University of New York at Albany.)	Albany, New York	1844	Public	17,944	Great Danes	2009	Women's golf	America East (AmEast)
Drake University	Des Moines, Iowa	1881	Nonsectarian	4,869	Bulldogs	2009	Women's rowing	Missouri Valley (MVC)
Jacksonville University	Jacksonville, Florida	1934	Nonsectarian	4,213	Dolphins	2011	Women's rowing	Atlantic Sun (ASUN)
La Salle University	Philadelphia, Pennsylvania	1863	Catholic (Lasallian)	5,191	Explorers	2016	Women's water polo	Atlantic 10 (A10)
Long Island University	Brooklyn & Brookville, New York (Note: The LIU athletic program, created with the 2019 merger of the athletic programs that previously represented the school's Brooklyn and Post campuses, bases some sports at the Brooklyn campus and others at the Post campus in Brookville, New York. LIU's current Metro sports operate from separate campuses, with women's rowing based at Post and women's water polo at Brooklyn.)	1926	Nonsectarian	15,197 (Note: Includes enrollment at both the Brooklyn and Post campuses. All LIU sports are open to students at both campuses who meet NCAA eligibility requirements.)	Sharks	2019	Women's water polo	Northeast (NEC)
Long Island University	Brooklyn & Brookville, New York	1926	Nonsectarian	15,197	Sharks	2022	Women's rowing	Northeast (NEC)
Robert Morris University	Moon Township, Pennsylvania	1921	Nonsectarian	4,895	Colonials	2010	Women's rowing	Horizon
Stetson University	DeLand, Florida	1883	Nonsectarian	4,341	Hatters	2013	Women's rowing	Atlantic Sun (ASUN)
Villanova University	Villanova, Pennsylvania	1842	Catholic (Augustinian)	11,023	Wildcats	2003	Women's water polo	Big East
Virginia Military Institute (VMI)	Lexington, Virginia	1839	S.M.C.	1,685	Keydets	2011	Women's water polo	Southern (SoCon)
Wagner College	Staten Island, New York	1883	Lutheran ELCA	2,211	Seahawks	2003	Women's water polo	Northeast (NEC)

=== Former ===
==== Former full members ====
Institution	Location	Founded	Type	Nickname	Joined (Note: Represents the calendar year when fall sports competition begins.)	Left (Note: Represents the calendar year when spring sports competition ends.)	Colors	Current conference
United States Military Academy (Army)	West Point, New York	1802	Federal (Military)	Black Knights	1981	1990		Patriot
Fordham University	Bronx, New York	1841	Catholic (Jesuit)	Rams	1981	1990		Atlantic 10 (A10)
College of the Holy Cross	Worcester, Massachusetts	1843	Catholic (Jesuit)	Crusaders	1983	1990		Patriot
La Salle University	Philadelphia, Pennsylvania	1863	Catholic (De La Salle; Brothers)	Explorers	1983	1992		Atlantic 10 (A10)
Loyola University Maryland	Baltimore, Maryland	1852	Catholic (Jesuit)	Greyhounds	1989	2013		Patriot
Monmouth University	West Long Branch, New Jersey	1933	Nonsectarian	Hawks	2013	2022		Coastal (CAA)

==== Former associate members ====
Institution	Location	Founded	Type	Nickname	Joined (Note: Represents the calendar year when fall sports competition begins.)	Left (Note: Represents the calendar year when spring sports competition ends.)	MAAC/Metro sport(s)	Current primary conference	Current conference, former Metro sport(s)
Boston University	Boston, Massachusetts	1839	Nonsectarian (Note: Historically affiliated with the United Methodist Church.)	Terriers	2009	2013	Women's golf	Patriot (Note: During its tenure as an associate member of the MAAC, Boston University's primary home conference was the America East Conference (AmEast).)	
Bryant University	Smithfield, Rhode Island	1863	Nonsectarian	Bulldogs	2012	2020	Men's swimming & diving	America East (AmEast) (Note: During its tenure as an associate member of the MAAC, Bryant's primary home conference was the Northeast Conference (NEC).)	
Bryant University	Smithfield, Rhode Island	1863	Nonsectarian	Bulldogs	2013	2019	Field hockey	America East (AmEast)	
Butler University	Indianapolis, Indiana	1855	Nonsectarian (Note: Historically affiliated with the Christian Church (Disciples of Christ).)	Bulldogs	2012	2013	Women's golf	Big East (Note: During its tenure as an associate member of the MAAC, Butler's primary home conference was the Atlantic 10 Conference (A10).)	
Colgate University	Hamilton, New York	1819	Nonsectarian	Raiders	1989	1990	Baseball	Patriot (Note: During its tenure as an associate member of the MAAC, Colgate's primary home conference was the North Atlantic Conference (NAC; now known as the America East Conference).)	N/A (Note: Colgate dropped baseball after the 1994 spring season (1993–94 school year).)
University of Dayton	Dayton, Ohio	1850	Catholic (Marianist)	Flyers	2014	2024	Women's golf	Atlantic 10 (A10)	
University of Detroit Mercy	Detroit, Michigan	1877	Catholic (Jesuit)	Titans	2009	2021	Men's lacrosse	Horizon	Northeast (NEC)
Duquesne University	Pittsburgh, Pennsylvania	1878	Catholic (Spiritans)	Dukes	1994	2008	Football	Atlantic 10 (A10)	Northeast (NEC)
Duquesne University	Pittsburgh, Pennsylvania	1878	Catholic (Spiritans)	Dukes	1996	1998	Women's lacrosse	Atlantic 10 (A10)	Atlantic 10 (A10)
Georgetown University	Washington, D.C.	1789	Catholic (Jesuit)	Hoyas	1993	2000	Football	Big East (Note: During its tenure as an associate member of the MAAC, Georgetown's primary home conference was the original Big East Conference.)	Patriot (Note: Primary conference: Big East)
University of Hartford	West Hartford, Connecticut	1877	Nonsectarian	Hawks	2009	2022	Women's golf	C. New England (CNE) (Note: Currently an NCAA Division III athletic conference.) (Note: During its tenure as an associate member of the MAAC, Hartford's primary home conference was the America East Conference (AmEast).)	
Jacksonville University (Note: Jacksonville remains in the MAAC as an affiliate in men's and women's rowing.)	Jacksonville, Florida	1934	Nonsectarian	Dolphins	2010	2013	Men's lacrosse	Atlantic Sun (ASUN)	
La Salle University	Philadelphia, Pennsylvania	1863	Catholic (De La Salle; Brothers)	Explorers	1999	2008	Football	Atlantic 10 (A10)	N/A (Note: La Salle, a full member of the Atlantic 10 since the 1995–96 school year, dropped football after the 2007 fall season (2007–08 school year). Even though the A-10 operated a football league from the 1997 to 2006 fall seasons (1997–98 to 2006–07 school years), La Salle was never an A-10 football member.)
La Salle University	Philadelphia, Pennsylvania	1863	Catholic (De La Salle; Brothers)	Explorers	2016	2024	Women's golf	Atlantic 10 (A10)	Atlantic 10 (A10)
Le Moyne College	Syracuse; New York (Note: The Le Moyne campus has a Syracuse mailing address, but almost entirely lies in the adjacent town of DeWitt.)	1946	Catholic (Jesuit)	Dolphins	1989	2008	Baseball	Northeast (NEC) (Note: During its tenure as an associate member of the MAAC, Le Moyne's primary home conferences were the Mideast Collegiate Conference (MECC) from 1983–84 to 1990–91, an NCAA Division II Independent during the 1991–92 school year, the New England Collegiate Conference from 1992–93 to 1995–96, and the Northeast-10 Conference (NE-10) from 1996–97 to 2022–23.)	
Le Moyne College	Syracuse; New York	1946	Catholic (Jesuit)	Dolphins	1998	2007	Women's lacrosse	Northeast (NEC)	
Long Island University	Brooklyn & Brookville; New York (Note: The LIU athletic program, created with the 2019 merger of the athletic programs that previously represented the school's Brooklyn and Post campuses, bases some sports at the Brooklyn campus and others at the Post campus in Brookville, New York. LIU's current MAAC sports operate from separate campuses, with men's lacrosse based at Post and women's water polo at Brooklyn.)	1926	Nonsectarian	Sharks	2022	2024	Men's lacrosse	Northeast (NEC)	
Long Island University Brooklyn (Note: After the 2018–19 school year, Long Island University merged the athletic programs of its Brooklyn and Post campuses into a single Division I program that now competes as the LIU Sharks. The unified program inherited all of LIU Brooklyn's memberships.) (LIU Brooklyn)	Brooklyn, New York	1926	Nonsectarian	Blackbirds (Note: Replaced by the LIU Sharks.)	2016	2019	Field hockey	Northeast (NEC) (Note: The merged LIU program remains in the NEC.)	
Loyola University Chicago	Chicago, Illinois	1870	Catholic (Jesuit)	Ramblers	2022	2024	Women's golf	Atlantic 10 (A10)	
Marist College (Note: Marist, Mount St. Mary's, Quinnipiac, Rider and Sacred Heart are currently full members of the Metro.)	Poughkeepsie; New York	1929	Nonsectarian (Note: Formerly part of the Marist Brothers of the Schools until 2003.)	Red Foxes	1995	1997	Men's lacrosse	Metro (Note: During its tenure as an associate member of the MAAC, Marist's primary home conference was the Northeast Conference (NEC).)	
Marist College	Poughkeepsie; New York	1929	Nonsectarian	Red Foxes	1996	1997	Men's rowing	Metro	
Marist College	Poughkeepsie; New York	1929	Nonsectarian	Red Foxes	1995	1997	Men's swimming & diving	Metro	
Marist College	Poughkeepsie; New York	1929	Nonsectarian	Red Foxes	1996	1997	Women's lacrosse	Metro	
Marist College	Poughkeepsie; New York	1929	Nonsectarian	Red Foxes	1996	1997	Women's rowing	Metro	
Marist College	Poughkeepsie; New York	1929	Nonsectarian	Red Foxes	1995	1997	Women's swimming & diving	Metro	
Mount St. Mary's University	Emmitsburg, Maryland (Note: The Mount St. Mary's campus has an Emmitsburg mailing address, but is located in unincorporated Frederick County.)	1808	Catholic (Archdiocese of Baltimore)	Mountaineers	1995	2010	Men's lacrosse	Metro (Note: During its tenure as an associate member of the MAAC, Mount St. Mary's's primary home conference was the Northeast Conference (NEC).)	
Mount St. Mary's University	Emmitsburg, Maryland	1808	Catholic (Archdiocese of Baltimore)	Mountaineers	1996	1998	Women's lacrosse	Metro	
Providence College	Providence; Rhode Island	1917	Catholic (Dominican)	Friars	1995	2009	Men's lacrosse	Big East (Note: During its tenure as an associate member of the MAAC, Providence's primary home conference was the original Big East Conference.)	
Quinnipiac University	Hamden, Connecticut	1929	Nonsectarian	Bobcats	1998	2001	Men's lacrosse	Metro (Note: During its tenure as an associate member of the MAAC, Quinnipiac's primary home conference was the Northeast Conference (NEC).)	
Rider University	Lawrenceville, New Jersey	1865	Nonsectarian	Broncs	1995	1997	Men's swimming & diving	Metro (Note: During its tenure as an associate member of the MAAC, Rider's primary home conference was the Northeast Conference (NEC).)	
Rider University	Lawrenceville, New Jersey	1865	Nonsectarian	Broncs	1995	1997	Women's swimming & diving	Metro	
Robert Morris University (Note: Robert Morris remains in the MAAC as an affiliate in women's rowing.)	Moon Township, Pennsylvania	1921	Nonsectarian	Colonials	2013	2014	Field hockey	Horizon (Note: During its tenure as an associate member of the MAAC, Robert Morris's primary home conference was the Northeast Conference (NEC).)	N/A (Note: Robert Morris dropped field hockey after the 2013 fall season (2013–14 school year).)
Sacred Heart University	Fairfield, Connecticut	1963	Catholic (Note: Sacred Heart was founded by the bishop of the Roman Catholic Diocese of Bridgeport, but has been led and primarily staffed by Catholic laity from its creation.) (Diocese of Bridgeport)	Pioneers	1999	2001	Men's lacrosse	Metro (Note: During its tenure as an associate member of the MAAC, Sacred Heart's primary home conference was the Northeast Conference (NEC).)	
Sacred Heart University	Fairfield, Connecticut	1963	Catholic (Diocese of Bridgeport)	Pioneers	2022	2024	Men's lacrosse	Metro	
Sacred Heart University	Fairfield, Connecticut	1963	Catholic (Diocese of Bridgeport)	Pioneers	2007	2024	Women's rowing	Metro	
Sacred Heart University	Fairfield, Connecticut	1963	Catholic (Diocese of Bridgeport)	Pioneers	2013	2019	Field hockey	Metro	
St. Bonaventure University	St. Bonaventure, New York	1858	Catholic (Franciscan)	Bonnies	2018	2022	Men's lacrosse	Atlantic 10 (A10)	
St. Francis College (Brooklyn)	Brooklyn Heights, New York	1859	Catholic (Franciscan)	Terriers	2003	2023	Women's water polo	N/A (Note: During its tenure as an associate member of the MAAC, Saint Francis (N.Y.)'s primary home conference was the Northeast Conference (NEC).) (Note: St. Francis discontinued its athletic program at the end of the 2022–23 school year.)	
Saint Joseph's University	Philadelphia, Pennsylvania	1851	Catholic (Jesuit)	Hawks	1996	2010	Men's lacrosse	Atlantic 10 (A10)	
St. John's University	Queens, New York	1870	Catholic (Vincentians)	Red Storm	1993	1999	Football	Big East (Note: During its tenure as an associate member of the MAAC, St. John’s (N.Y.)'s primary home conference was the original Big East Conference.)	N/A (Note: St. John's (N.Y.) dropped the sport after the 2002 fall season (2002–03 school year).)
St. John's University	Queens, New York	1870	Catholic (Vincentians)	Red Storm	2002	2003	Football	Big East	N/A
Virginia Military Institute (VMI)	Lexington, Virginia	1839	S.M.C.	Keydets	2002	2013	Men's lacrosse	Southern (SoCon) (Note: During its first tenure as an associate member of the MAAC, VMI's primary home conference was the Big South Conference (BSC).)	Northeast (NEC)
Virginia Military Institute (VMI)	Lexington, Virginia	1839	S.M.C.	Keydets	2022	2024	Men's lacrosse	Southern (SoCon)	Northeast (NEC)
Wagner College	Staten Island, New York	1883	Lutheran ELCA	Seahawks	1999	2010	Men's lacrosse	Northeast (NEC)	
Wagner College	Staten Island, New York	1883	Lutheran ELCA	Seahawks	2022	2024	Men's lacrosse	Northeast (NEC)	
Wagner College	Staten Island, New York	1883	Lutheran ELCA	Seahawks	1996	1998	Women's lacrosse	Northeast (NEC)	

=== Membership timeline ===
Full member (all sports) Full member (non-football) Associate member (football) Associate member (sport) Other Conference Other Conference

== Sports ==
The Metro Conference sponsors championship competition in 10 men's and 13 women's NCAA sanctioned sports, plus two sports not organized by the NCAA - esports, which are fully coeducational, and men's rowing.

Teams in Metro Conference competition
Sport	Men's	Women's	Coed
Baseball	13	–	–
Basketball	13	13	–
Cross country	13	13	–
Esports	–	–	(8)
Golf	11	11	–
Lacrosse	8	12	–
Rowing	(5)	11	–
Soccer	13	13	–
Softball	-	13	–
Swimming and diving	9	12	–
Tennis	9	10	–
Track and field (indoor)	10	12	–
Track and field (outdoor)	10	12	–
Volleyball	-	12	–
Water polo	-	9	–

=== Men's ===
School	Baseball	Basketball	Cross country	Esports (Note: Esports, in which men and women directly compete alongside and against one another, are not sanctioned by the NCAA, but governed by the Electronic Gaming Federation.)	Golf	Lacrosse	Rowing (Note: Men's rowing is not sanctioned by the NCAA, but governed by the Intercollegiate Rowing Association.)	Soccer	Swimming	Tennis	Track and field (indoor)	Track and field (outdoor)	Total Metro sports
Canisius	Yes	Yes	Yes	Yes	Yes	Yes	No	Yes	Yes	No	Yes	Yes	10
Fairfield	Yes	Yes	Yes	No	Yes	No (Note: Fairfield's men's lacrosse team does not participate in the Metro; it currently plays in the Coastal Athletic Association.)	Yes	Yes	Yes	Yes	No	No	8
Iona	Yes	Yes	Yes	No	Yes	Yes	Yes	Yes	Yes	Yes	Yes	Yes	11
Manhattan	Yes	Yes	Yes	Yes	Yes	Yes	Yes	Yes	Yes	No	Yes	Yes	11
Marist	Yes	Yes	Yes	Yes	No	Yes	Yes	Yes	Yes	Yes	Yes	Yes	11
Merrimack	Yes	Yes	Yes	No	Yes	Yes	No	Yes	No	Yes	Yes	Yes	9
Mount St. Mary's	Yes	Yes	Yes	Yes	Yes	Yes	No	Yes	Yes	Yes	Yes	Yes	11
Niagara	Yes	Yes	Yes	Yes	Yes	No	No	Yes	Yes	Yes	No	No	8
Quinnipiac	Yes	Yes	Yes	Yes	No	Yes	No	Yes	No	Yes	No	No	7
Rider	Yes	Yes	Yes	No	Yes	No	No	Yes	Yes	Yes	Yes	Yes	9
Sacred Heart	Yes	Yes	Yes	No	Yes	Yes	No	Yes	No	Yes	Yes	Yes	9
Saint Peter's	Yes	Yes	Yes	Yes	Yes	No	No	Yes	Yes	No	Yes	Yes	9
Siena	Yes	Yes	Yes	Yes	Yes	Yes	No	Yes	No	Yes	Yes	Yes	10
Totals	13	13	13	8	11	9	4+1 (Note: Affiliate member Jacksonville.)	13	9	10	10	10	122+1
Future member
Le Moyne	Yes	Yes	Yes	No	Yes	Yes	No	Yes	Yes	Yes	Yes	Yes	10
Stonehill	Yes	Yes	Yes	No	No (Note: Stonehill will be adding men’s golf for the 2027-28 academic year)	No	No	Yes	Yes	Yes	Yes	Yes	8

==== Unsponsored ====
School	Fencing	Football	Ice hockey	Volleyball	Water polo	Wrestling
Canisius	No	No	AHA	No	No	No
Iona	No	No	No	No	CWPA	No
Manhattan	No	No	No	NEC	No	No
Marist	No	PFL	No	No	No	No
Merrimack	No	Independent	Hockey East	NEC	No	No
Mount St. Mary's	No	No	No	No	CWPA	No
Niagara	No	No	AHA	No	No	No
Quinnipiac	No	No	ECAC	No	No	No
Rider	No	No	No	No	No	MAC
Sacred Heart	NEIFC	CAA Football	AHA	EIVA	No	EIWA
Stonehill	No	TBA (Note: Stonehill has not announced a future football affiliation.)	Independent	No	No	No

=== Women's ===
School	Basketball	Cross country	Esports (Note: Esports, in which men and women directly compete alongside and against one another, are not sanctioned by the NCAA, but governed by the Electronic Gaming Federation.)	Golf	Lacrosse	Rowing	Soccer	Softball	Swimming	Tennis	Track and field (indoor)	Track and field (outdoor)	Volleyball	Water polo	Total Metro sports
Canisius	Yes	Yes	Yes	No	Yes	Yes	Yes	Yes	Yes	No	Yes	Yes	Yes	No	11
Fairfield	Yes	Yes	No	Yes	Yes	Yes	Yes	Yes	Yes	Yes	No	No	Yes	No	10
Iona	Yes	Yes	No	No	Yes	Yes	Yes	Yes	Yes	Yes	Yes	Yes	Yes	Yes	12
Manhattan	Yes	Yes	Yes	Yes	Yes	Yes	Yes	Yes	Yes	Yes	Yes	Yes	Yes	No	13
Marist	Yes	Yes	Yes	No	Yes	Yes	Yes	Yes	Yes	Yes	Yes	Yes	Yes	Yes	13
Merrimack	Yes	Yes	No	Yes	Yes	Yes	Yes	Yes	Yes	Yes	Yes	Yes	Yes	No	12
Mount St. Mary's	Yes	Yes	Yes	Yes	Yes	No	Yes	Yes	Yes	Yes	Yes	Yes	No	Yes	12
Niagara	Yes	Yes	Yes	Yes	Yes	No	Yes	Yes	Yes	Yes	Yes	Yes	Yes	No	10
Quinnipiac	Yes	Yes	Yes	Yes	Yes	No	Yes	Yes	No	Yes	Yes	Yes	Yes	No	11
Rider	Yes	Yes	No	No	Yes	No	Yes	Yes	Yes	Yes	Yes	Yes	Yes	No	10
Sacred Heart	Yes	Yes	No	Yes	Yes	Yes	Yes	Yes	Yes	Yes	Yes	Yes	Yes	No	12
Saint Peter's	Yes	Yes	Yes	Yes	No	No	Yes	Yes	Yes	No	Yes	Yes	Yes	No	10
Siena	Yes	Yes	Yes	Yes	Yes	No	Yes	Yes	Yes	Yes	Yes	Yes	Yes	Yes	13
Totals	13	13	8	8+1 (Note: Affiliate member Albany)	12	8+5 (Note: Affiliate members Drake, Jacksonville, LIU, Robert Morris, and Stetson)	13	13	12	11	12	12	12	4+5 (Note: Affiliate members La Salle, LIU, Villanova, VMI, and Wagner.)	135+11
Future member
Le Moyne	Yes	Yes	No	Yes	Yes	No	Yes	Yes	Yes	Yes	Yes	Yes	Yes	No	11
Stonehill	Yes	Yes	No	Yes	Yes	No	Yes	Yes	Yes	Yes	Yes	Yes	Yes	No	11

==== Unsponsored ====
Future members are highlighted in gray.

School	Acrobatics and tumbling (Note: Graduated from the NCAA Emerging Sports for Women program in January 2026. The first NCAA championship will be held in 2026–27.)	Bowling	Equestrian (Note: Currently part of the NCAA Emerging Sports for Women program.)	Fencing	Flag football	Field hockey	Ice hockey	Rugby	Wrestling
Canisius	Independent	No	No	No	No	No	No	No	No
Fairfield	No	No	No	No	No	CAA	No	No	No
Le Moyne	No	NEC (Note: Le Moyne has not announced a future bowling affiliation.)	No	No	No	No	No	No	No
Manhattan	Independent	No	No	No	No	No	No	No	No
Merrimack	No	Independent	No	No	No	NEC	Hockey East	No	No
Mount St. Mary's	No	Independent	No	No	CC	No	No	Independent	No
Niagara	No	NEC	No	No	No	No	No	No	No
Quinnipiac	Independent	No	No	No	No	NEC	ECAC	Independent	No
Rider	No	No	No	No	No	NEC	No	No	No
Sacred Heart	No	CUSA	Independent	NEIFC	No	NEC	NEWHA	Independent	Independent
Stonehill	No	No	Independent	No	No	NEC (Note: Stonehill has not announced a future field hockey affiliation.)	NEWHA	No	No

== Facilities ==
School	Basketball arena	Capacity	Baseball stadium	Capacity	Soccer stadium	Capacity
Canisius	Koessler Athletic Center	2,176	Demske Sports Complex	1,200	Demske Sports Complex	1,200
Fairfield	Leo D. Mahoney Arena	3,500	Alumni Baseball Diamond	600	Lessing Field	600
Iona	Hynes Athletic Center	2,611	City Park	—N/a	Mazzella Field	2,440
Le Moyne	Ted Grant Court	2,627	Dick Rockwell Field	—N/a	Ted Grant Field	—N/a
Manhattan	Draddy Gymnasium	2,345	Clover Stadium	9,362	Gaelic Park	2,000
Marist	McCann Arena	3,200	James J. McCann Baseball Field	350	Tenney Stadium	5,000
Merrimack	Hammel Court	1,200	Warrior Baseball Diamond (Note: Merrimack also schedules home baseball games at off-campus venues in its area.)	—N/a	Martone–Mejail Field	3,000
Mount St. Mary's	Knott Arena	3,121	E. T. Straw Family Stadium	—N/a	Waldron Family Stadium	1,000
Niagara	Gallagher Center	2,400	Bobo Field	—N/a	Niagara Field	1,200
Quinnipiac	People's United Center	3,570	Quinnipiac Baseball Field	—N/a	Quinnipiac Soccer Field	—N/a
Rider	Canastra Hammer Arena	1,650	Sonny Pittaro Field	2,000	Ben Cohen Field	1,000
Sacred Heart	William H. Pitt Center	2,100	Veterans Memorial Park	500	Park Avenue Field	—N/a
Saint Peter's	Run Baby Run Arena	3,200	Joseph J. Jaroschak Field	—N/a	Joseph J. Jaroschak Field	—N/a
Siena	MVP Arena (men); Alumni Recreation Center (women)	15,229; 4,000	Siena Baseball Field	500	Siena Turf Field	1,000
Stonehill	Merkert Gymnasium	1,560	Lou Gorman Field	—N/a	Skyhawk Field	—N/a

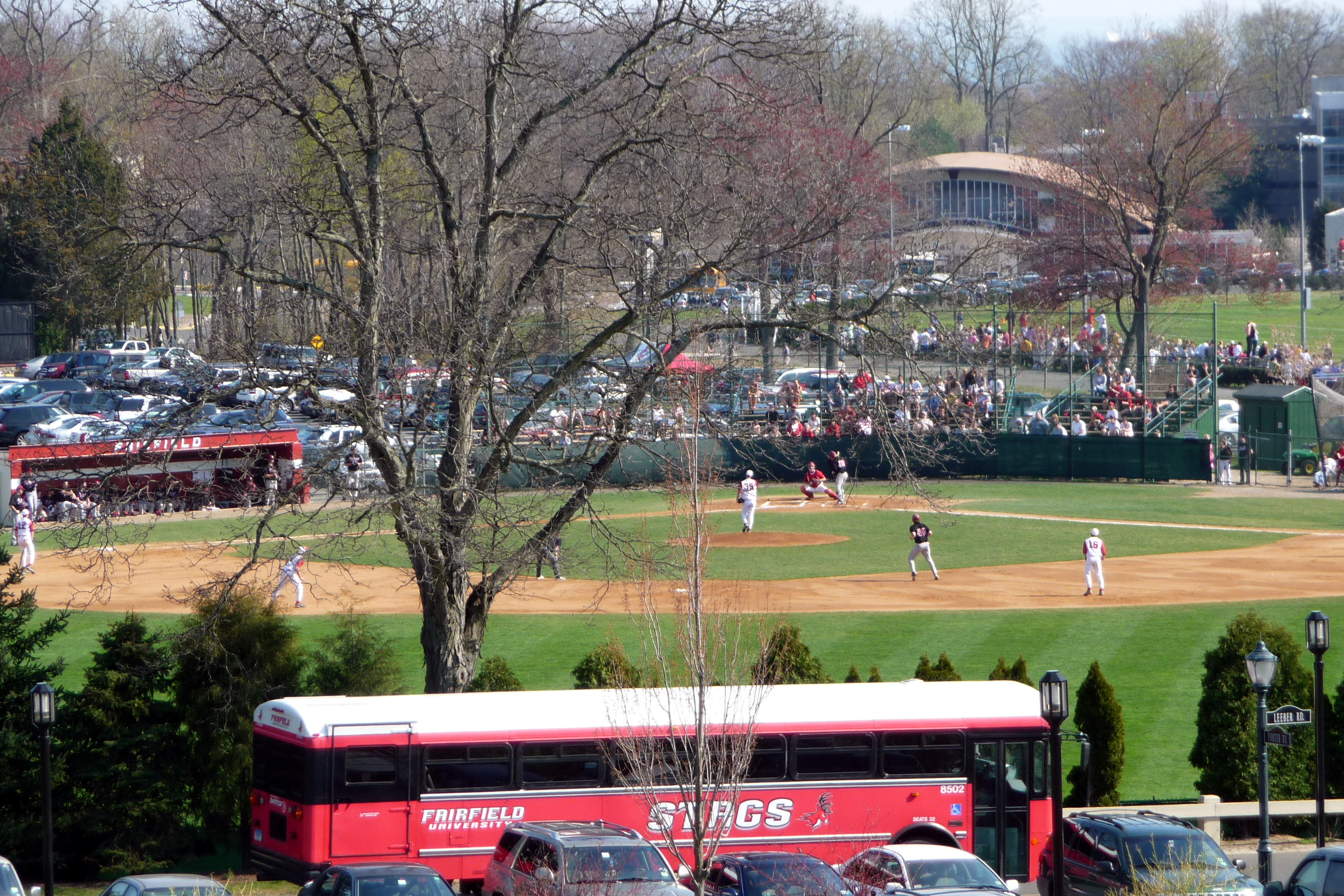
Alumni Baseball Diamond
Fairfield Stags

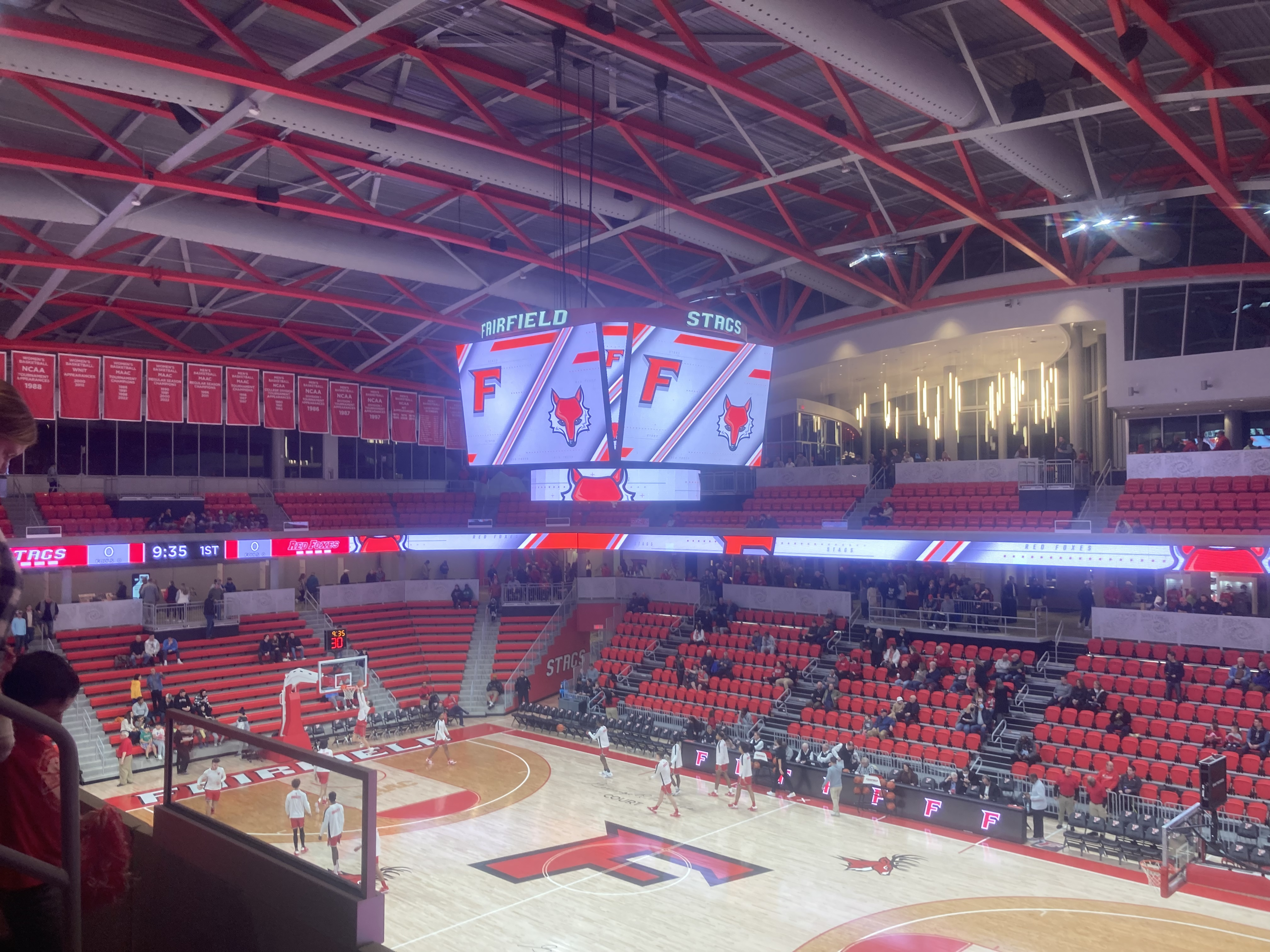
Leo D. Mahoney Arena
Fairfield Stags

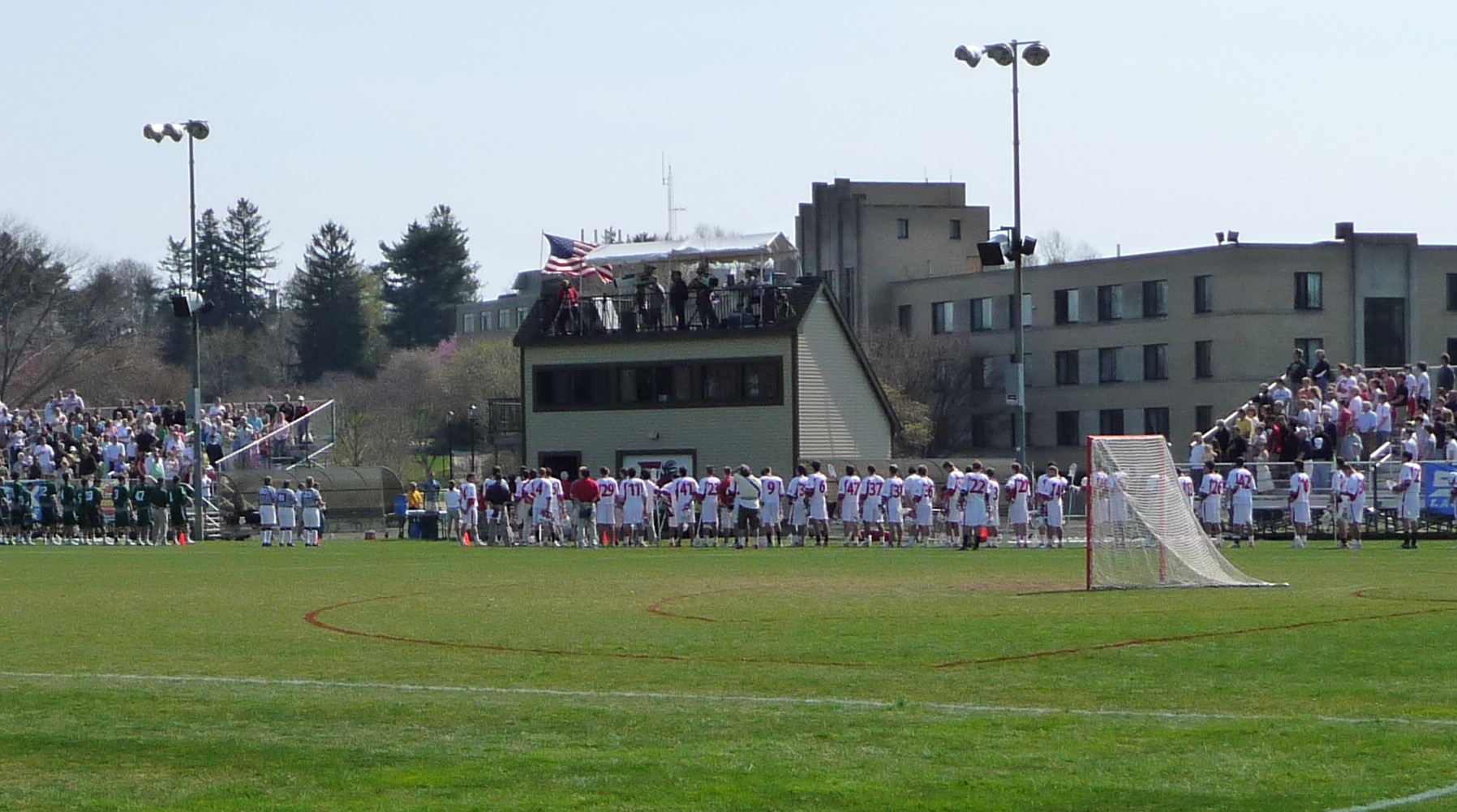
Lessing Field
Fairfield Stags

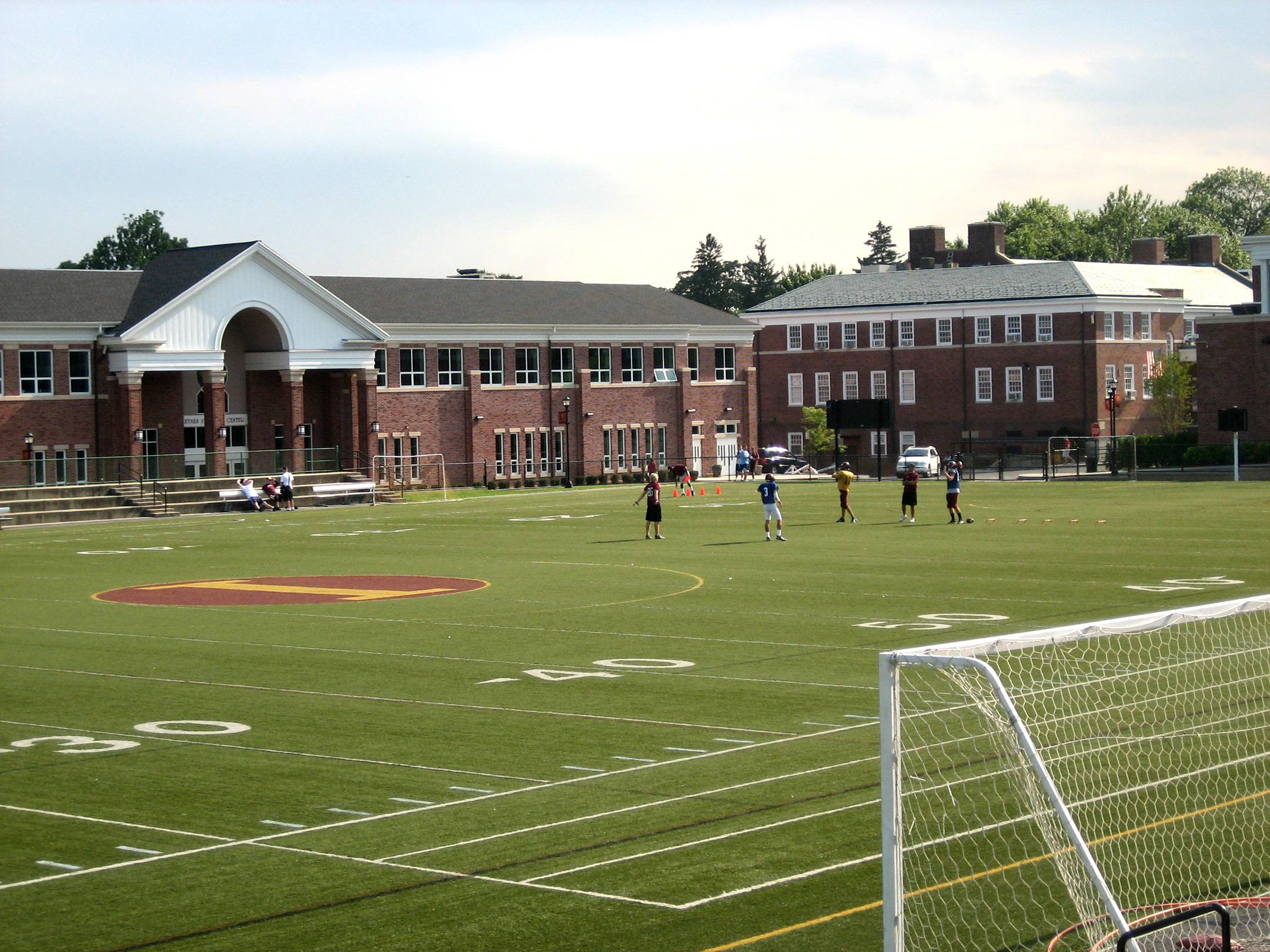
Hynes Athletic Center
Iona Gaels

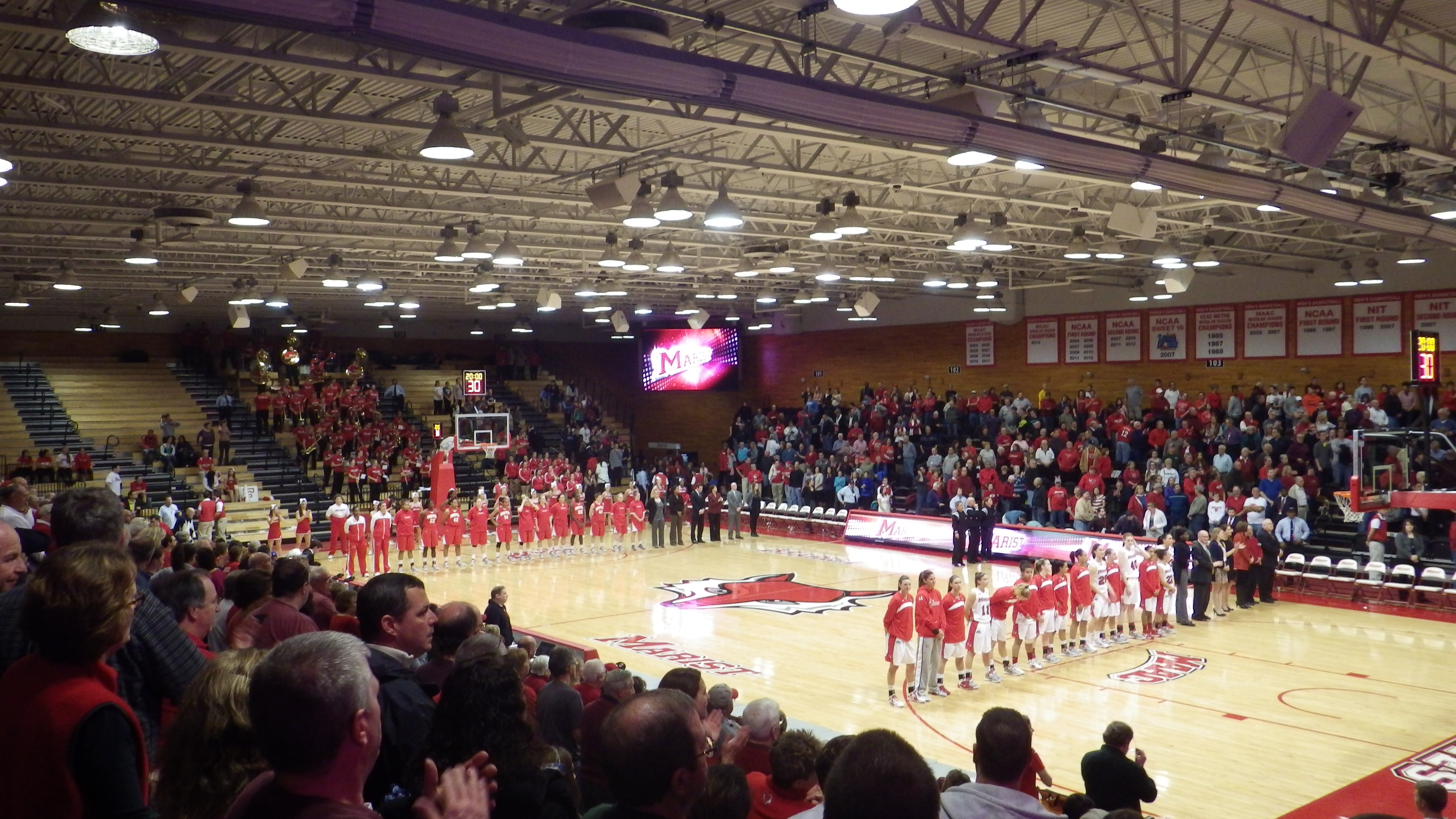
McCann Arena
Marist Red Foxes

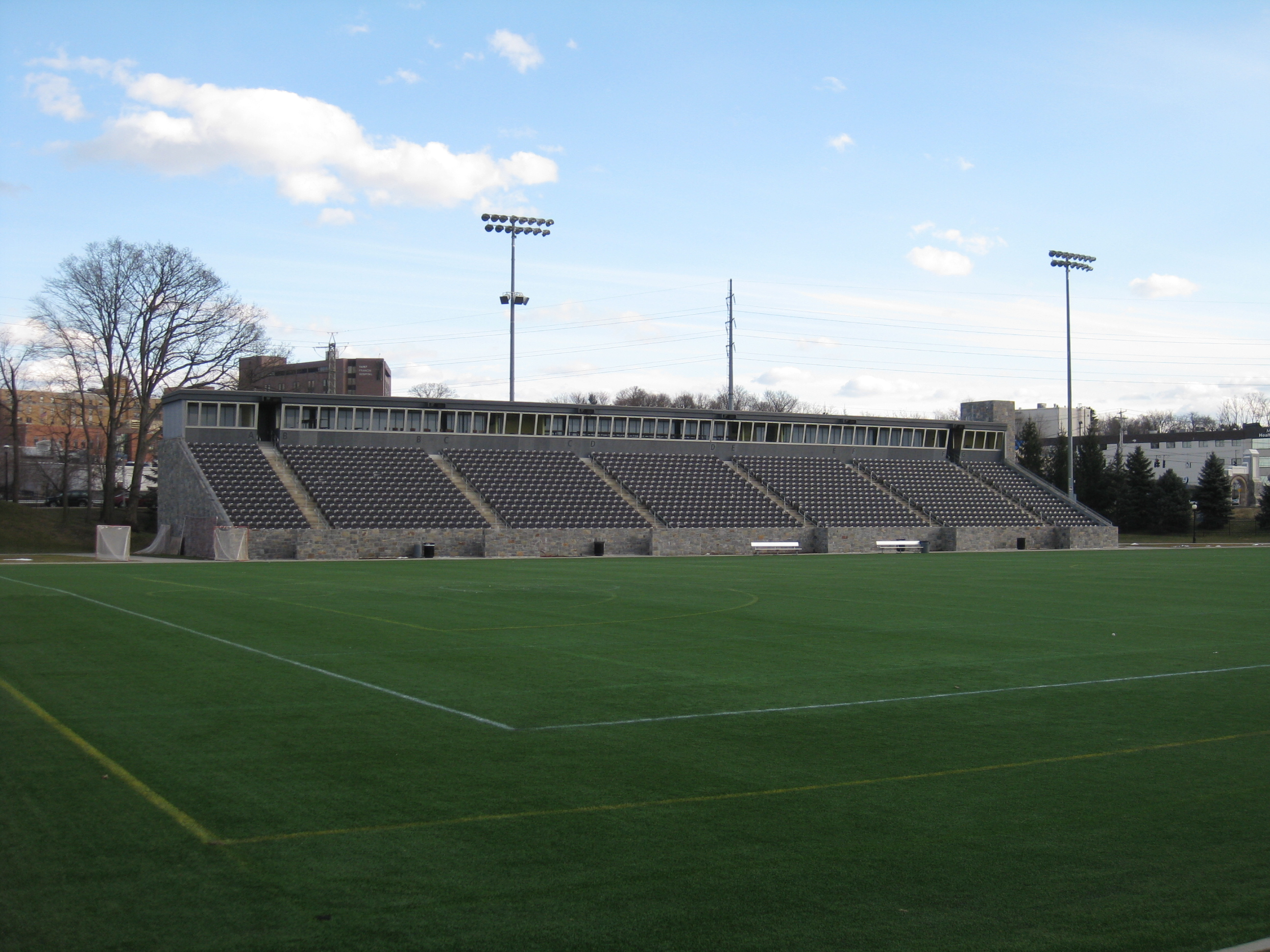
Tenney Stadium
Marist Red Foxes

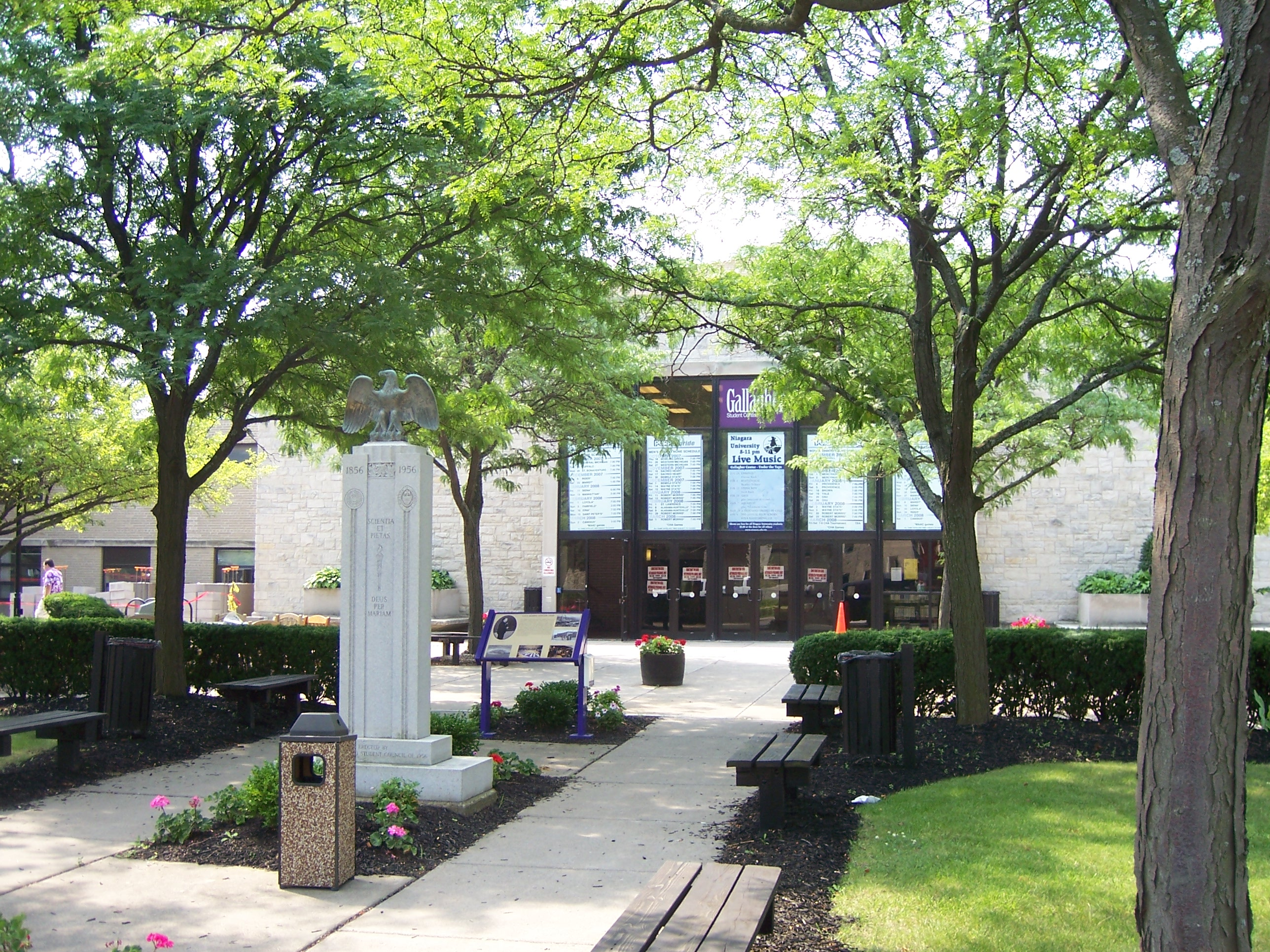
Gallagher Center
Niagara Purple Eagles

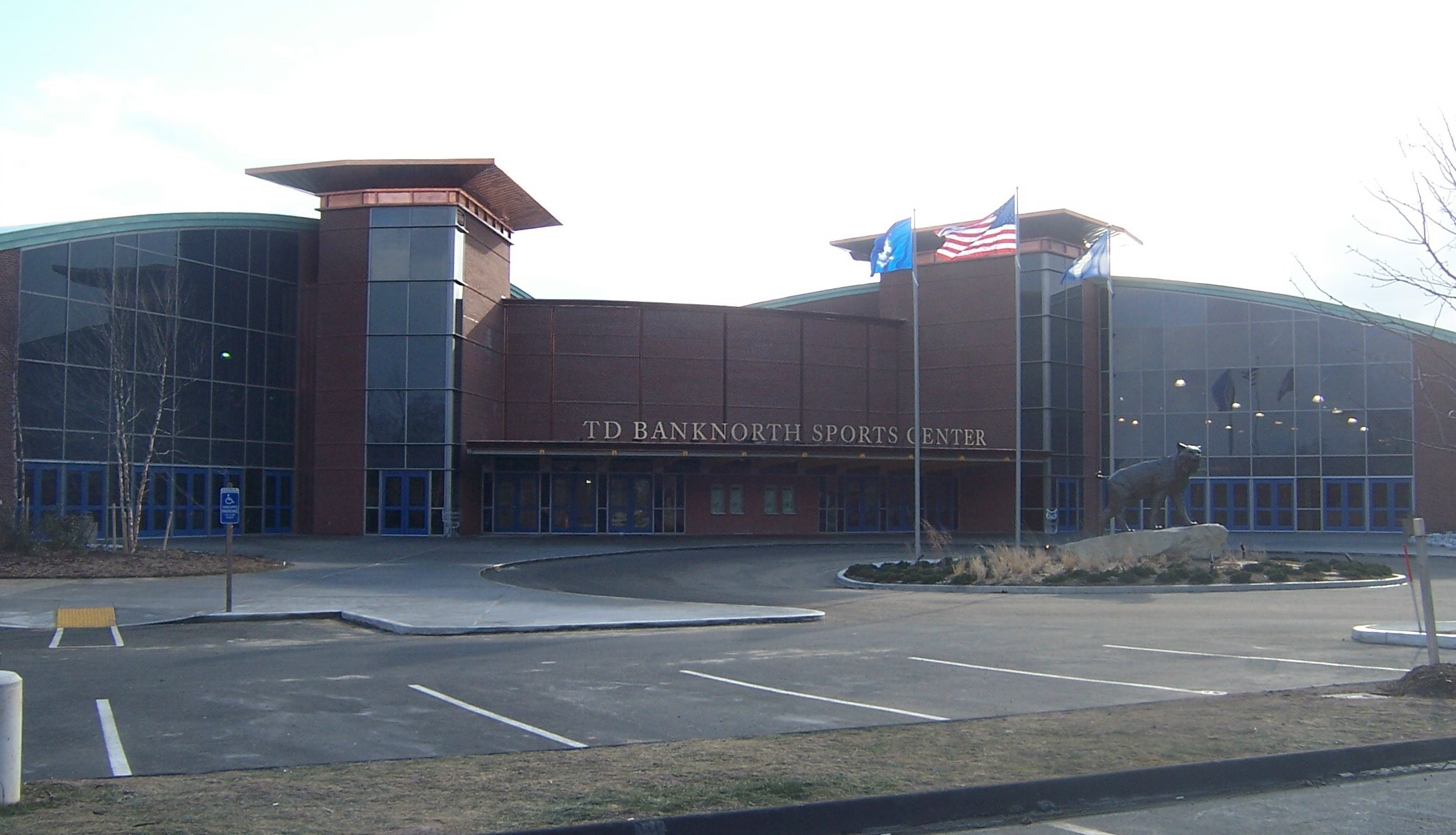
TD Bank Sports Center
Quinnipiac Bobcats

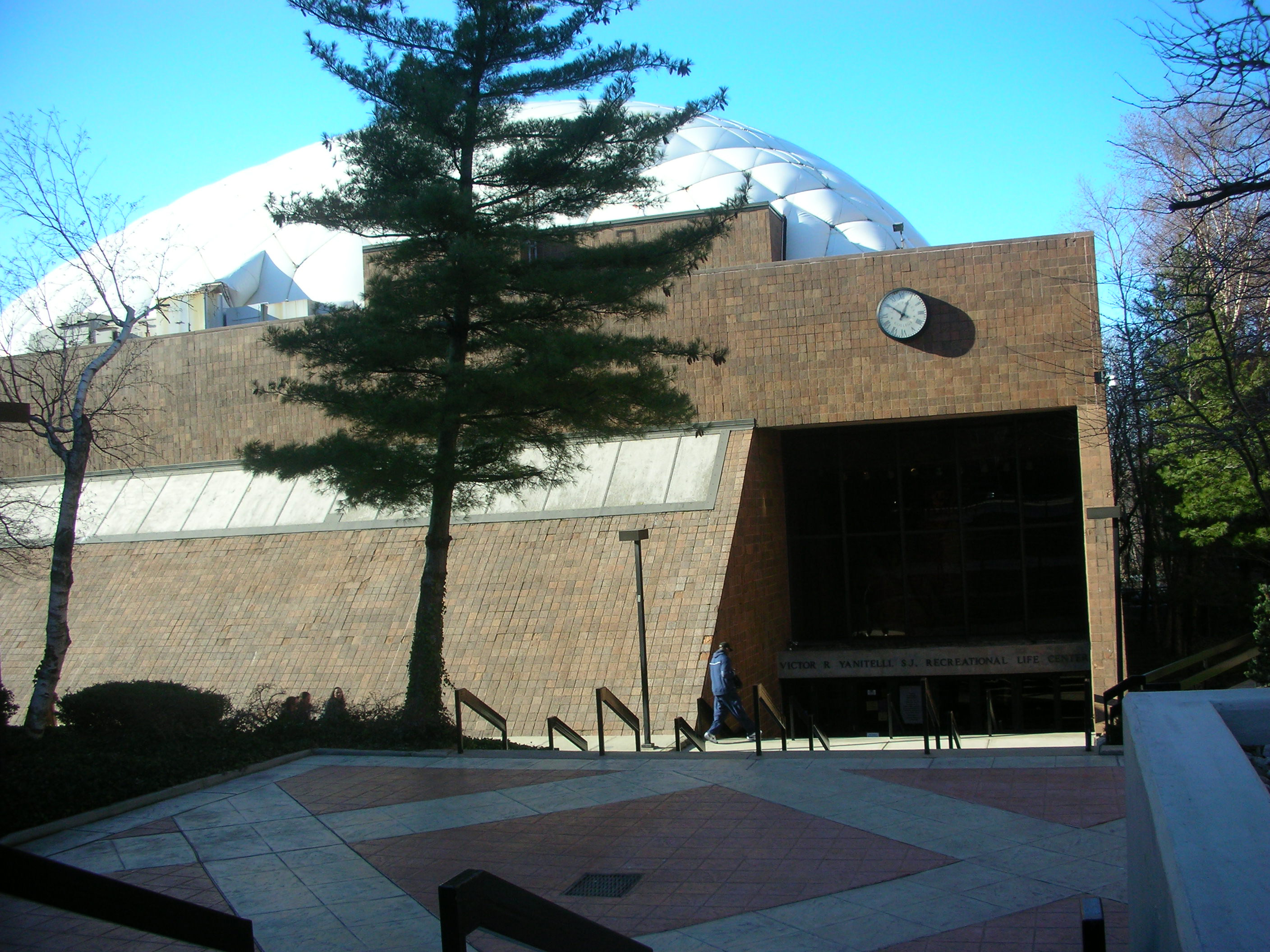
Run Baby Run Arena
Saint Peter's Peacocks

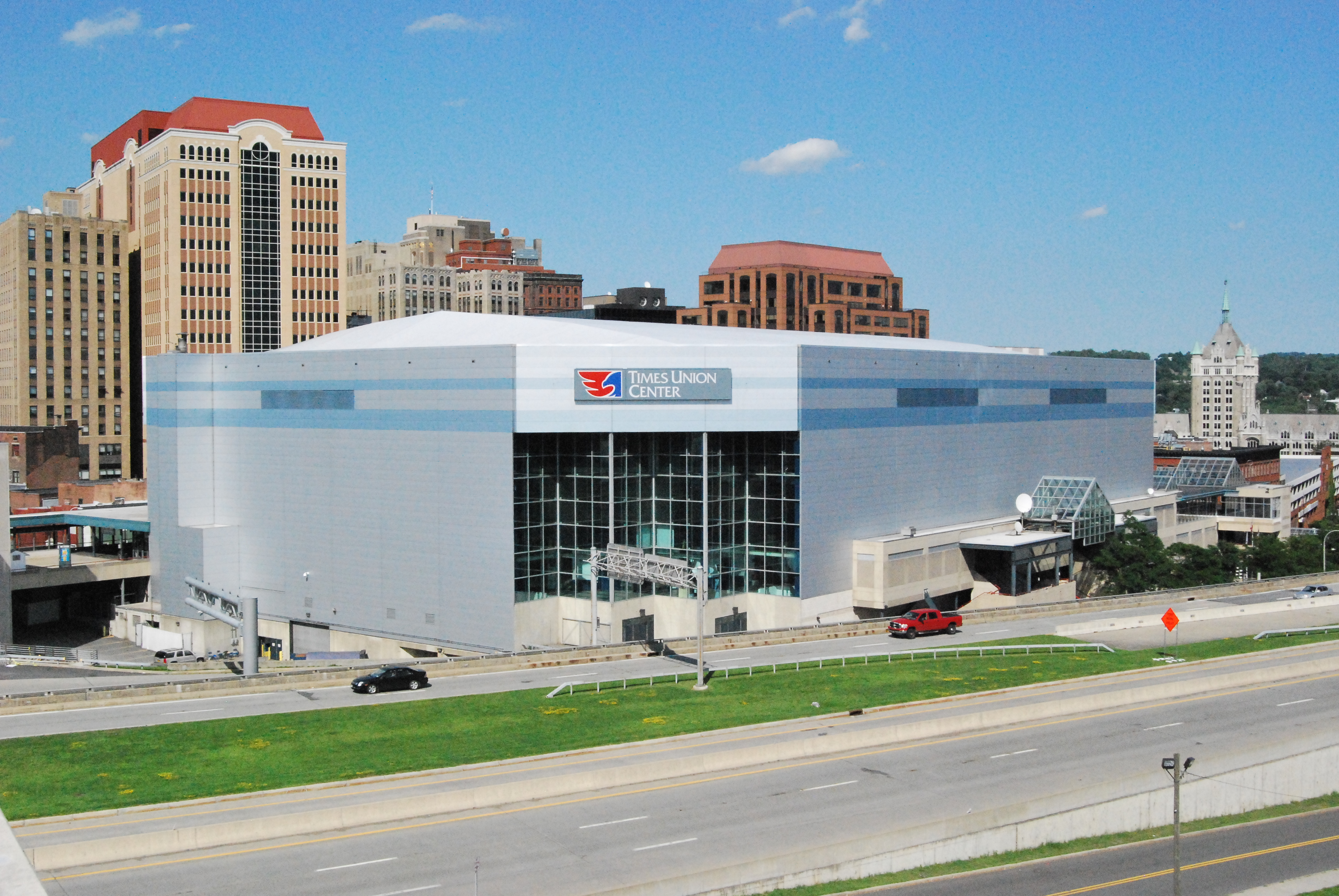
MVP Arena
Siena Saints

== Basketball ==
=== Men's ===
Year	Regular season champion(s)	Tournament champion	Player of the Year	Defensive Player of the Year	Coach of the Year
1982	Saint Peter's (20–9, 9–1)	(3) Iona (24–9, 7–3)	William Brown (Saint Peter's)		Bob Dukiet (Saint Peter's)
1983	Iona (22–9, 8–2)	(2) Fordham (19–11, 7–3)	Steve Burtt, Sr. (Iona)		Gordon Chiesa (Manhattan)
1984	La Salle (20–11, 11–3); Saint Peter's (23–6, 11–3); Iona	(3) Iona (23–8, 11–3)	Steve Burtt, Sr. (Iona)		Pat Kennedy (Iona)
1985	Iona	(1) Iona (26–5, 11–3)	Randy Cozzens (Army)		Les Wothke (Army)
1986	Fairfield	(1) Fairfield (24–7, 13–1)	Tony George (Fairfield)		Mitch Buonaguro (Fairfield)
1987	Saint Peter's (21–8, 11–3)	(7) Fairfield (15–16, 5–9)	Kevin Houston (Army)		Ted Fiore (Saint Peter's)
1988	La Salle	(1) La Salle (24–10, 14–0)	Lionel Simmons (La Salle)		Speedy Morris (La Salle)
1989	La Salle	(1) La Salle (26–6, 13–1)	Lionel Simmons (La Salle)		Speedy Morris (La Salle); Ted Fiore (Saint Peter's)
1990	(N) Holy Cross (24–6, 14–2) (S) La Salle	(S1) La Salle (30–2, 16–0)	Lionel Simmons (La Salle)		George Blaney (Holy Cross)
1991	Siena (25–10, 12–4); La Salle (19–10, 12–4)	(3) Saint Peter's (24–7, 11–5)	Marc Brown (Siena)		Ted Fiore (Saint Peter's)
1992	Manhattan (25–9, 13–3)	(2) La Salle (20–11, 12–4)	Randy Woods (La Salle)		Steve Lappas (Manhattan)
1993	Manhattan	(1) Manhattan (23–7, 12–2)	Keith Bullock (Manhattan)		Jack Armstrong (Niagara)
1994	Canisius (22–7, 12–2)	(5) Loyola (MD) (17–13, 6–8)	Doremus Bennerman (Siena)		John Beilein (Canisius)
1995	Manhattan (26–5, 12–2)	(3) Saint Peter's (19–11, 10–4)	Craig Wise (Canisius)		Fran Fraschilla (Manhattan)
1996	Iona (21–8, 10–4); Fairfield (20–10, 10–4)	(5) Canisius (19–11, 7–7)	Darrell Barley (Canisius)		Paul Cormier (Fairfield)
1997	Iona (22–8, 11–3)	(8) Fairfield (11–19, 2–12)	Mindaugas Timinskas (Iona)		Tim Welsh (Iona)
1998	Iona	(1) Iona (27–6, 15–3)	Kashif Hameed (Iona)		Tim Welsh (Iona)
1999	Niagara (17–12, 13–5); Siena	(2) Siena (25–6, 13–5)	Alvin Young (Niagara)		Joe Mihalich (Niagara)
2000	Siena (24–9, 15–3)	(2) Iona (20–11, 13–5)	Tariq Kirksay (Iona)		Paul Hewitt (Siena)
2001	Iona; Niagara (15–13, 12–6); Siena (20–11, 12–6)	(1) Iona (22–11, 12–6)	Demond Stewart (Niagara)		Dave Magarity (Marist)
2002	Rider (17–11, 13–5); Marist (19–9, 13–5)	(7) Siena (17–19, 9–9)	Mario Porter (Rider)	Deng Gai (Fairfield)	Don Harnum (Rider)
2003	Manhattan	(1) Manhattan (23–7, 14–4)	Luis Flores (Manhattan)	Deng Gai (Fairfield)	Bobby Gonzalez (Manhattan)
2004	Manhattan	(1) Manhattan (25–6, 16–2)	Luis Flores (Manhattan)	Tyquawn Goode (Fairfield)	Tim O'Toole (Fairfield)
2005	Niagara; Rider (19–11, 13–5)	(1) Niagara (20–10, 13–5)	Juan Mendez (Niagara)	Deng Gai (Fairfield)	Joe Mihalich (Niagara)
2006	Manhattan (20–11, 14–4)	(2) Iona (23–8, 13–5)	Keydren Clark (Saint Peter's)	Ricky Soliver (Iona)	Bobby Gonzalez (Manhattan)
2007	Marist (25–9, 14–4)	(2) Niagara (23–12, 13–5)	Jared Jordan (Marist)	Jason Thompson (Rider)	Matt Brady (Marist)
2008	Siena; Rider (13–5)	(1) Siena (23–11, 13–5)	Jason Thompson (Rider)	Jason Thompson (Rider)	Tommy Dempsey (Rider)
2009	Siena	(1) Siena (27–8, 16–2)	Kenny Hasbrouck (Siena)	Tyrone Lewis (Niagara)	Fran McCaffery (Siena)
2010	Siena	(1) Siena (27–7, 17–1)	Alex Franklin (Siena)	Anthony Johnson (Fairfield)	Kevin Willard (Iona)
2011	Fairfield (25–8, 15–3)	(4) Saint Peter's (20–14, 11–7)	Ryan Rossiter (Siena)	Anthony Nelson (Niagara)	Ed Cooley (Fairfield)
2012	Iona (25–8, 15–3)	(2) Loyola (MD) (24–9, 13–5)	Scott Machado (Iona)	Rhamel Brown (Manhattan)	Jimmy Patsos (Loyola (MD))
2013	Niagara (19–14, 13–5)	(4) Iona (20–14, 11–7)	Lamont Jones (Iona)	Rhamel Brown (Manhattan)	Joe Mihalich (Niagara)
2014	Iona (22–11, 17–3)	(2) Manhattan (25–8, 15–5)	Billy Baron (Canisius)	Rhamel Brown (Manhattan)	Tim Cluess (Iona)
2015	Iona (26–9, 17–3)	(3) Manhattan (19–14, 13–7)	David Laury (Iona)	Ousmane Drame (Quinnipiac)	Kevin Baggett (Rider)
2016	Monmouth (28–8, 17–3)	(2) Iona (22–11, 16–4)	Justin Robinson (Monmouth)	Javion Ogunyemi (Siena)	King Rice (Monmouth)
2017	Monmouth (27–7, 18–2)	(3) Iona (22–13, 12–8)	Justin Robinson (Monmouth)	Chazz Patterson (Saint Peter's)	King Rice (Monmouth)
2018	Rider (22–10, 15–3); Canisius (21–12, 15–3)	(4) Iona (20–14, 11–7)	Jermaine Crumpton (Canisius); Kahlil Dukes (Niagara)	Pauly Paulicap (Manhattan)	Kevin Baggett (Rider)
2019	Iona	(1) Iona (17–15, 12–6)	Cameron Young (Quinnipiac)	Jonathan Kasibabu (Fairfield)	Tim Cluess (Iona)
2020	Siena (19–10, 15–5)	(Note: Conference Tournament was shortened after the semifinal and Siena was declared the champion)	Jalen Pickett (Siena)	KC Ndefo (Saint Peter's)	Shaheen Holloway (Saint Peter's)
2021	Siena (12–4, 12–4); Monmouth (12–6, 12–7)	(9) Iona (12–5, 6–3)	Manny Camper (Siena)	KC Ndefo (Saint Peter's)	King Rice (Monmouth)
2022	Iona (25–6, 17–3)	(2) Saint Peter's (19–11, 14–6)	Tyson Jolly (Iona)	KC Ndefo (Saint Peter's)	Rick Pitino (Iona)
2023	Iona (25–7, 17-3)	(1) Iona	Walter Clayton Jr. (Iona)	Berrick JeanLouis (Iona); Josh Roberts (Manhattan)	Rick Pitino (Iona)
2024	Quinnipiac (23–8, 15-5)	(5) Saint Peter's (19-14, 12-8)	Matt Balanc (Quinnipiac)	Latrell Reid (Saint Peter's)	Tom Pecora (Quinnipiac)
2025	Quinnipiac (20-13, 15-5)	(6) Mount St. Mary's (22-12, 12-8)	Amarri Monroe (Quinnipiac)	Bryan Etumnu (Merrimack)	Tom Pecora (Quinnipiac)
2026	Merrimack (21-10, 17-3)	(3) Siena (22-10, 13-7)	Kevair Kennedy (Merrimack)	KC Ugwuakazi (Merrimack)	Joe Gallo (Merrimack)

Notes

- MAAC men's basketball conference tournament locations

==== Postseason history ====
NCAA tournament (11–44)
Year	Metro Rep.	Opponent	Result
1984	(10) Iona	(7) Virginia	L 57–58
1985	(13) Iona	(4) Loyola (IL)	L 58–59
1986	(13) Fairfield	(4) Illinois	L 51–75
1987	(16) Fairfield	(1) Indiana	L 58–92
1988	(13) La Salle	(4) Kansas St.	L 53–66
1989	(8) La Salle	(9) Louisiana Tech	L 74–83
1990	(4) La Salle	(13) So. Mississippi (5) Clemson	W 79–63; L 75–79
1991	(12) Saint Peter's	(5) Texas	L 65–73
1992	(13) La Salle	(4) Seton Hall	L 76–78
1993	(11) Manhattan	(6) Virginia	L 66–78
1994	(15) Loyola (MD)	(2) Arizona	L 55–81
1995	(15) Saint Peter's (13) Manhattan	(2) Massachusetts (4) Oklahoma (5) Arizona St.	L 51–68; W 77–67; L 54–64
1996	(13) Canisius	(4) Utah	L 43–72
1997	(16) Fairfield	(1) North Carolina	L 74–82
1998	(12) Iona	(5) Syracuse	L 61–63
1999	(13) Siena	(4) Arkansas	L 80–94
2000	(14) Iona	(3) Maryland	L 59–74
2001	(14) Iona	(3) Mississippi	L 70–72
2002	(16) Siena	(16) Alcorn St. (1) Maryland	W 81–77; L 70–85
2003	(14) Manhattan	(3) Syracuse	L 65–76
2004	(12) Manhattan	(5) Florida (4) Wake Forest	W 75–60; L 80–84
2005	(14) Niagara	(3) Oklahoma	L 67–84
2006	(13) Iona	(4) LSU	L 64–80
2007	(16) Niagara	(16) Florida A&M (1) Kansas	W 77–69; L 67–107
2008	(13) Siena	(4) Vanderbilt (12) Villanova	W 83–62; L 72–84
2009	(9) Siena	(8) Ohio State (1) Louisville	W 74–72; L 72–79
2010	(13) Siena	(4) Purdue	L 64–72
2011	(14) Saint Peter's	(3) Purdue	L 43–65
2012	(15) Loyola (MD) (14) Iona	(2) Ohio State (14) BYU	L 59–78; L 72–78
2013	(15) Iona	(2) Ohio State	L 70–95
2014	(13) Manhattan	(4) Louisville	L 64–71
2015	(16) Manhattan	(16) Hampton	L 64–74
2016	(13) Iona	(4) Iowa State	L 81–94
2017	(14) Iona	(3) Oregon	L 77–93
2018	(15) Iona	(2) Duke	L 67–89
2019	(16) Iona	(1) North Carolina	L 73–88
2021	(15) Iona	(2) Alabama	L 55–68
2022	(15) Saint Peter's	(2) Kentucky (7) Murray State (3) Purdue (8) North Carolina	W 85–79; W 70–60 W 67–64; L 49–69
2023	(13) Iona	(4) UConn	L 63–87
2024	(15) Saint Peter's	(2) Tennessee	L 49–83
2025	(16) Mount St Mary's	(16) American (1) Duke	W 83–72; L 49-93
2026	(16) Siena	(1) Duke	L 65-71

NIT Tournament (26–45)
Year	Metro Rep.	Opponent	Result
1982	Fordham; Saint Peter's; Iona	Virginia Tech; Syracuse; Rutgers	L 58–69; L 75–84; L 51–55
1983	Fordham; Iona	So. Florida; St. Bonaventure; Nebraska	L 69–81; W 90–76; L 73–85
1984	Fordham; Saint Peter's; La Salle	Weber State; Tennessee; Pittsburgh	L 63–75; L 40–55; L 91–95
1985	Fordham	Richmond	L 57–59
1987	Saint Peter's; La Salle	Oklahoma; Villanova; Niagara; Illinois St. Arkansas-LR; So. Mississippi	L 60–76; W 86–84; W 89–81; W 70–50; W 92–72; L 80–84
1988	Fordham	Houston	L 61–69
1989	Saint Peter's	Villanova	L 56–76
1990	Holy Cross; Fordham	Rutgers; Southern U. Rutgers	L 78–87; W 106–70; L 74–81
1991	La Salle; Siena	Massachusetts; Fairleigh Dickinson; South Carolina; Massachusetts	L 90–93; W 90–85; W 63–58; L 80–82
1992	Manhattan	Wisconsin-GB; Rutgers; Notre Dame	W 67–65; W 62–61; L 58–74
1993	Niagara	Boston College	L 83–87
1994	Manhattan; Canisius; Siena	Old Dominion; Villanova; Georgia Tech; Tulane; Bradley; Villanova; Kansas St.	L 74–76; L 79–103; W 78–68; W 89–79; W 75–62; L 58–66; W 92–79
1995	Canisius	Seton Hall; Bradley; Washington St. Virginia Tech; Penn State	W 83–71; W 55–53; W 89–80; L 59–71; L 62–66
1996	Iona; Fairfield; Manhattan	St. Joseph's PA; Providence; Wisconsin	L 78–82; L 79–91; L 42–55
1997	Iona	Connecticut	L 66–71
1998	Rider	Penn State	L 68–82
2000	Siena	Massachusetts; Penn State	W 66–65; L 103–105
2002	Manhattan	Villanova	L 69–84
2003	Fairfield; Siena	Boston College; Villanova; W. Michigan; Alabama-Birm.	L 78–90; W 74–59; W 68–62; L 71–80
2004	Niagara	Troy State; Nebraska	W 87–83; L 70–78
2006	Manhattan	Fairleigh Dickinson; Maryland; Old Dominion	W 80–77; W 87–84; L 66–70
2007	Marist	Oklahoma State; N.C. State	W 67–64; L 62–69
2009	Niagara	Rhode Island	L 62–68
2011	Fairfield	Colorado State; Kent State	W 62–60; L 68–72
2013	Niagara	Maryland	L 70–86
2014	Iona	Louisiana Tech	L 88–89
2015	Iona	Rhode Island	L 75–88
2016	Monmouth	Bucknell; George Washington	W 90–80; L 71–87
2017	Monmouth	Ole Miss	L 83–91
2018	Rider	Oregon	L 86–99
2022	Iona	Florida	L 74–79

CBI Tournament (7–8)
Year	Metro Rep.	Opponent	Result
2008	Rider	Old Dominion	L 65–68
2014	Siena	Stony Brook; Penn State; Illinois State; Fresno State*	W 66–55; W 54–52; W 61–49; W 61–57; L 75–89; W 81–68
2015	Rider	Loyola (IL)	L 59–62
2016	Siena	Morehead State	L 80–84
2018	Canisius	Jacksonville State	L 78–80
2024	Quinnipiac; Fairfield	Evansville; Little Rock; Chicago State; Seattle	L 63–94; W 82–75; W 77–74; L 58–75
2025	Manhattan	Incarnate Word	L 85–92

'*' Best-of-three Championship Series

CIT Tournament (19–18)
Year	Metro Rep.	Opponent	Result
2009	Rider	Liberty	L 64–79
2010	Fairfield	George Mason; Creighton	W 101–96; L 55–73
2011	Rider; Iona	Northern Iowa; Valparaiso; Buffalo; East Tennessee State; Santa Clara	L 50–84; W 85–77; W 78–63; W 83–80; L 69–76
2012	Manhattan Fairfield	Albany; Fairfield; Yale; Manhattan; Robert Morris; Mercer	W 89–79; L 57–69; W 68–56; W 69–57; W 67–61; L 59–64
2013	Canisius Fairfield; Loyola (MD) Rider	Elon; Youngstown State; Evansville; Kent State; Boston University; Kent State; East Carolina; Hartford; East Carolina	W 69–53; W 84–82; L 83–84; L 71–73; W 70–63; W 73–59; L 58–70; W 63–54; L 54–75
2014	Canisius; Quinnipiac	VMI; Yale	L 100–111; L 68–69
2015	Canisius	Dartmouth; Bowling Green; NJIT	W 87–72; W 82–59; L 73–78
2016	Fairfield	New Hampshire	L 62–77
2017	Canisius; Fairfield; Saint Peter's	Samford; UMBC; Albany; Texas State; Furman; Texas A&M–Corpus Christi	L 74–78; L 83–88; W 59–55; W 49–44; W 77–51; W 62–61
2018	Niagara	Eastern Michigan	L 65–83
2019	Quinnipiac	NJIT	L 81–92

==== NCAA tournament at-large bids ====
In 2012, Iona, who was inspired by one of their all around best players Sean Armand, which had lost in the semifinals of that year's MAAC tournament, received an NCAA at-large tournament bid. This was the second time the conference was awarded multiple men's NCAA bids.

After St. Peter's won the 1995 MAAC tournament, the NCAA men's basketball tournament selection committee awarded Manhattan University an at large bid. The Jaspers proved the committee correct by defeating Oklahoma in the first round.

The same first-round success Manhattan enjoyed in the 1995 NCAA tournament could not be matched by Iona. In the 2012 NCAAs, the Gaels unexpectedly relinquished a 25-point, first-half lead to the BYU Cougars, falling 78–72 in Dayton, Ohio. Further, Iona's offense, the highest-scoring (per game) in the nation, managed just 17 points in the second half of that upset.

It was the largest comeback in NCAA tournament history, besting the 22-point hole the Duke Blue Devils rallied from to defeat the Maryland Terrapins in the Final Four of the 2001 NCAA tournament.

=== Women's ===
Year	Regular season champion(s)	Tournament champion	Player of the Year	Defensive Player of the Year	Coach of the Year
1982	Saint Peter's (25–5, 5–0)	(1) Saint Peter's	Sheri Lauyer (Saint Peter's)		Mike Granelli (Saint Peter's)
1983	Saint Peter's (25–3, 8–1)	(1) Saint Peter's	Shelia Tighe (Manhattan)		Dianne Nolan (Fairfield)
1984	Saint Peter's (22–6, 9–3)	(1) Saint Peter's	Shelia Tighe (Manhattan)		Dianne Nolan (Fairfield)
1985	Saint Peter's (25–4, 10–2)	(2) Holy Cross (21–7, 9–3)	Janet Hourihan (Holy Cross)		Togo Palazzi (Holy Cross)
1986	Saint Peter's (26–3, 11–1)	(2) La Salle (21–9, 10–2)	Adrienne Draughn (Saint Peter's)		Mike Granelli (Saint Peter's)
1987	La Salle (21–7, 9–3)	(5) Manhattan (20–11, 6–6)	Tracey Quinn (Holy Cross)		John Miller (La Salle)
1988	La Salle (25–4, 11–1)	(3) Fairfield (19–9, 8–4)	Tracey Sneed (La Salle)		John Miller (La Salle)
1989	La Salle (27–2, 11–1)	(2) Holy Cross (21–9, 10–2)	Jeanine Radice (Fordham)		John Miller (La Salle)
1990	Fairfield (25–6, 15–1)	(2) Manhattan (18–13, 8–2)	Tonya Grant (Saint Peter's)		Dianne Nolan (Fairfield)
1991	Fairfield (25–6, 15–1)	(1) Fairfield	Val Higgins (Siena)		Gina Castelli (Siena)
1992	La Salle (25–5, 14–2)	(2) Saint Peter's (24–7, 13–3)	Jennifer Cole (La Salle)		Mike Rappl (Canisius)
1993	Niagara (17–10, 9–5)	(2) Saint Peter's (18–11, 9–5)	Samantha David (Niagara)		Bill Agronin (Niagara)
1994	Siena (24–4, 13–1)	(2) Loyola (MD) (18–11, 12–2)	Liz Lopes (Siena)		Gina Castelli (Siena)
1995	Saint Peter's (22–6, 12–2)	(4) Loyola (MD) (20–9, 7–6)	Patty Stoffey (Loyola (MD))		Kara Rehbaum (Canisius)
1996	Saint Peter's (23–5, 12–2)	(2) Manhattan (19–11, 11–3)	Gina Somma (Manhattan)		Mike Granelli (Saint Peter's)
1997	Saint Peter's (25–4, 14–0)	(1) Saint Peter's	Heather Fiore (Canisius); Jessica Grosarth (Fairfield)		Dianne Nolan (Fairfield); Mike Granelli (Saint Peter's)
1998	Siena (20–8, 16–2)	(2) Fairfield (20–10, 14–4)	Melanie Halker (Siena)		Gina Castelli (Siena)
1999	Siena (22–9, 16–2)	(2) Saint Peter's (25–6, 15–3)	Melanie Halker (Siena)		Mike Granelli (Saint Peter's)
2000	Fairfield (25–8, 15–3)	(2) Saint Peter's (23–8, 14–4)	Gail Strumpf (Fairfield)		Dianne Nolan (Fairfield)
2001	Siena (24–6, 17–1)	(1) Siena	Gunta Basko (Siena)		Gina Castelli (Siena)
2002	Siena (23–7, 16–2)	(2) Saint Peter's (25–6, 15–3)	Gunta Basko (Siena)	Gunta Basko (Siena	Sal Buscaglia (Manhattan); Gina Castelli (Siena)
2003	Manhattan (20–10, 15–3)	(1) Manhattan	Liene Jansone (Siena)	Eva Cunningham (Niagara)	Bill Agronin (Niagara)
2004	Siena (17–11, 13–5)	(2) Marist (20–11, 13–5)	Jenel Stevens (Canisius)	Jenel Stevens (Canisius); Jolene Johnston (Siena)	Brian Giorgis (Marist)
2005	Marist (22–7, 15–3)	(2) Canisius (21–10, 14–4)	Eva Cunningham (Niagara)	Alisa Kresge (Marist); Lauren Surber (Siena)	Brian Giorgis (Marist); Bill Agronin (Niagara)
2006	Marist (23–7, 16–2)	(1) Marist	Fifi Camara (Marist)	Alisa Kresge (Marist)	Anthony Bozzella (Iona); Brian Giorgis (Marist)
2007	Marist (29–6, 17–1)	(1) Marist	Martina Weber (Iona)	Alisa Kresge (Marist)	Joe Logan (Loyola (MD))
2008	Marist (32–3, 18–0)	(1) Marist	Rachele Fitz (Marist)	Tania Kennedy (Saint Peter's)	Brian Giorgis (Marist)
2009	Marist (29–4, 16–2)	(1) Marist	Rachele Fitz (Marist)	Brittané Russell (Canisius)	Terry Zeh (Canisius)
2010	Marist (25–7, 15–3)	(1) Marist	Rachele Fitz (Marist)	Stephanie Geehan (Fairfield)	Kendra Faustin (Niagara)
2011	Marist (31–3, 18–0)	(1) Marist	Erica Allenspach (Marist)	Katie Sheahin (Loyola (MD))	Brian Giorgis (Marist)
2012	Marist (24–7, 17–1)	(1) Marist	Corielle Yarde (Marist)	Katie Sheahin (Loyola (MD))	Brian Giorgis (Marist)
2013	Marist (23–6, 18–0)	(1) Marist	Damika Martinez (Iona)	Leanne Ockenden (Marist)	Brian Giorgis (Marist)
2014	Iona (25–4, 18–2)	(2) Marist (27–6, 18–2)	Damika Martinez (Iona)	Leanne Ockenden (Marist)	Billi Godsey (Iona)
2015	Quinnipiac (28–3, 20–0)	(1) Quinnipiac	Damika Martinez (Iona)	Tehresa Coles (Siena)	Tricia Fabbri (Quinnipiac)
2016	Quinnipiac (24–8, 17–3)	(2) Iona (23–11, 16–4)	Tori Jarosz (Marist)	Amani Tatum (Manhattan)	Tricia Fabbri (Quinnipiac)
2017	Quinnipiac (24–6, 17–3)	(1) Quinnipiac	Robin Perkins (Rider)	Jackie Benitez (Siena)	Lynn Milligan (Rider)
2018	Quinnipiac (26–5, 17–0)	(1) Quinnipiac	Victoria Rampado (Niagara)	Maura Fitzpatrick (Marist)	Tricia Fabbri (Quinnipiac)
2019	Quinnipiac (23–6, 18–0)	(1) Quinnipiac	Stella Johnson (Rider)	Courtney Warley (Manhattan)	Tricia Fabbri (Quinnipiac)
2020	Rider (25–4, 18–2); Marist (25–4, 18–2)	(Note: Conference Tournament was cancelled due to the coronavirus pandemic and Rider was declared the champion.)	Stella Johnson (Rider)	Amari Johnson (Rider)	Lynn Milligan (Rider)
2021	Marist (12–4, 14–2)	(1) Marist	Mackenzie DeWees (Quinnipiac)	Mikala Morris (Quinnipiac)	Brian Giorgis (Marist); Marc Mitchel (Saint Peter's)
2022	Fairfield (25–6, 19–1)	(1) Fairfield	Lou Lopez Sénéchal (Fairfield)	Juana Camilion (Iona)	Joe Frager (Fairfield)
2023	Iona (24-6, 18–2)	(1) Iona	Juana Camilion (Iona)	Juana Camilion (Iona)	Billi Chambers (Iona)
2024	Fairfield (28-1, 20–0)	(1) Fairfield	Janelle Brown (Fairfield)	Elisa Mevius (Siena)	Carly Thibault-DuDonis (Fairfield)
2025	Fairfield (28-4, 19-1)	(1) Fairfield	Gal Raviv (Quinnipiac)	Ny'Ceara Pryor (Sacred Heart)	Tricia Fabbri (Quinnipiac)
2026	Quinnipiac (24-5, 19-1)	(2) Fairfield (27-4, 19-1)	Kaety L'Amoreaux (Fairfield)	Paloma Garcia (Merrimack)	Kelly Morrone (Merrimack)

==== Postseason history ====
NCAA tournament (9–46)
Year	Metro Rep.	Opponent	Result
1982	(8) Saint Peter's	(1) Old Dominion	L 42–75
1983	(33) La Salle	(32) South Carolina State	L 67–85
1985	(7) Holy Cross	(2) Ohio State	L 60–102
1986	(10) La Salle	(7) Villanova	L 55–60
1987	(10) Manhattan	(7) Indiana	L 55–70
1988	(10) Fairfield (8) La Salle	(7) St. John's (9) Penn State	L 70–83; L 85–86
1989	(9) Holy Cross (9) La Salle	(8) Temple (8) Connecticut (1) Tennessee	L 80–90; W 72–63; L 61–91
1990	(12) Manhattan	(5) Clemson	L 55–79
1991	(12) Fairfield	(5) Providence	L 87–88
1992	(11) Saint Peter's	(6) Connecticut	L 66–83
1993	(12) Saint Peter's	(5) Miami	L 44–61
1994	(14) Loyola (MD)	(3) Virginia	L 47–72
1995	(10) Loyola (MD)	(7) Oklahoma	L 45–90
1996	(14) Manhattan	(3) Virginia	L 55–100
1997	(15) Saint Peter's	(2) Louisiana Tech	L 50–94
1998	(15) Fairfield	(2) Connecticut	L 52–93
1999	(13) Saint Peter's	(4) Virginia Tech	L 48–73
2000	(14) Saint Peter's	(3) Mississippi State	L 60–94
2001	(11) Siena (12) Fairfield	(6) Colorado (5) Utah	L 57–79; L 78–98
2002	(11) Saint Peter's	(6) Cincinnati	L 63–76
2003	(14) Manhattan	(3) Mississippi State	L 47–73
2004	(14) Marist	(3) Oklahoma	L 45–58
2005	(15) Canisius	(2) Duke	L 48–80
2006	(14) Marist	(3) Georgia	L 60–75
2007	(13) Marist	(4) Ohio State (5) Middle Tennessee (1) Tennessee	W 67–63; W 73–59; L 46–65
2008	(7) Marist	(10) DePaul (2) LSU	W 76–57; L 49–68
2009	(12) Marist	(5) Virginia	L 61–68
2010	(12) Marist	(5) Georgetown	L 42–62
2011	(10) Marist	(7) Iowa State (2) Duke	W 74–64; L 66–71
2012	(13) Marist	(4) Georgia (5) St. Bonaventure	W 76–70; L 63–66
2013	(12) Marist	(5) Michigan State	L 47–55
2014	(11) Marist	(6) Iowa	L 65–87
2015	(12) Quinnipiac	(5) Oklahoma	L 84–111
2016	(15) Iona	(2) Maryland	L 58–74
2017	(12) Quinnipiac	(5) Marquette (4) Miami (FL) (1) South Carolina	W 68–65; W 85–78; L 58–100
2018	(9) Quinnipiac	(8) Miami (FL) (1) Connecticut	W 86–72; L 46–71
2019	(11) Quinnipiac	(6) South Dakota State	L 65–76
2021	(15) Marist	(2) Louisville	L 43–74
2022	(15) Fairfield	(2) Texas	L 52–70
2023	(14) Iona	(3) Duke	L 49–89
2024	(13) Fairfield	(4) Indiana	L 56–89
2025	(12) Fairfield	(5) Kansas State	L 85–41
2026	(11) Fairfield	(6) Notre Dame	L 60-79

WNIT Tournament (8–23)
Year	Metro Rep.	Opponent	Result
1999	Siena	Georgetown; Wisconsin	W 86–73; L 85–107
2000	Fairfield	Wisconsin	L 46–82
2002	Siena	St. Joseph's (PA)	L 55–84
2003	Siena	Seton Hall; Creighton	W 66–58; L 86–96
2007	Iona	Long Island; Indiana	W 91–79; L 71–74
2008	Iona	Quinnipiac; St. John's	W 71–59; L 59–65
2009	Canisius	Syracuse	L 65–90
2010	Iona	Maryland	L 53–88
2011	Loyola (MD)	Old Dominion; Virginia	W 67–65; L 49–71
2012	Fairfield	Drexel	L 41–57
2013	Iona	Drexel	L 50–59
2014	Iona; Quinnipiac	Harvard; Villanova	L 89–90; L 66–74
2015	Marist	Temple	L 54–67
2016	Quinnipiac	Maine; Temple	W 90–43; L 64–62
2017	Rider	Virginia Tech	L 62–76
2018	Marist	St. John's	L 47–68
2019	Rider	West Virginia	L 43–83
2022	Quinnipiac	Rhode Island; Boston College	W 61–50; L 68–94
2023	Niagara	Green Bay	L 52–84
2024	Niagara	Le Moyne; Vermont	W 91-86; L 63–69
2025	Siena	Howard	L 62–72
2026	Merrimack	NJIT	L 65-68

WBI Tournament (12–9)
Year	Metro Rep.	Opponent	Result
2010	Fairfield	Towson; Appalachian State	W 69–55; L 36–59
2011	Manhattan	Sacred Heart; Wright State; UAB	W 52–48; W 75–73; L 43–62
2012	Manhattan	Robert Morris; Holy Cross; Minnesota	W 77–54; W 78–63; L 54–67
2013	Fairfield	St. Francis; Pennsylvania	W 71–51; L 48–49
2014	Fairfield	Bryant; Maine; UIC	W 90–86; W 63–50; L 44–74
2015	Siena	Stony Brook; Xavier; Mercer; Louisiana Lafayette	W 53–46; W 69–49; W 65–54; L 50–52
2016	Fairfield	UMBC	L 49–61
2021	Manhattan	Cleveland State; Loyola-Chicago; FIU	L 55–68; W 56–51; L 58–59

WBIT Tournament (1–2)
Year	Metro Rep.	Opponent	Result
2025	Quinnipiac	Seton Hall	L 40-57
2026	Quinnipiac	George Mason; Stanford	W 64-71; L 69-81

== Baseball ==
=== Champions ===
Year	Champion(s)
1982	Army
1983	Fairfield
1984	Iona
1985	LaSalle
1986	Holy Cross
1987	Fordham
1988	Fordham
1989	LaSalle
1990	Le Moyne~; Fordham^
1991	Le Moyne~; Fairfield^
1992	Le Moyne~; Iona^
1993	Le Moyne~; Fairfield^
1994	Saint Peter's
1995	Siena
1996	Siena
1997	Siena
1998	Le Moyne
1999	Siena
2000	Marist
2001	Marist
2002	Marist
2003	Le Moyne
2004	Le Moyne
2005	Marist
2006	Manhattan
2007	Le Moyne
2008	Rider
2009	Marist
2010	Rider
2011	Manhattan
2012	Manhattan
2013	Canisius
2014	Siena
2015	Canisius
2016	Fairfield
2017	Marist
2018	Canisius
2019	Quinnipiac
2020	Canceled due to COVID-19
2021	Rider
2022	Canisius
2023	Rider
2024	Niagara
2025	Fairfield
2026	Rider

From 1990 through 1993, the MAAC, split into two divisions.
~North Division Champion
^South Division Champion

==== Postseason history ====
NCAA tournament (10–58)
Year	MAAC Rep.	Opponent	Result
1997	Marist	Florida State; Western Carolina	L 2–4; L 3–8
1999	Siena	Wake Forest; Virginia Tech	L 4–22; L 5–11
2000	Marist	East Carolina; McNeese State; East Carolina	L 3–12; W 6–5; L 7–8
2001	Marist	Stanford; Long Beach State; Stanford	L 3–4; W 7–6; L 0–6
2002	Marist	SW Missouri State; Nebraska; SW Missouri State	W 5–4*; L 1–9; L 2–5
2003	Le Moyne	North Carolina State; Western Carolina	L 2–8; L 5–9
2004	Le Moyne	Arkansas; Missouri	L 1–4; L 3–11
2005	Marist	LSU; Northwestern State	L 5–14; L 3–4
2006	Manhattan	Nebraska; Miami; San Francisco; Miami	W 4–1; L 2–8; W 6–4; L 4–10
2007	Le Moyne	Texas A&M; Ohio State	L 2–7; L 5–6*
2008	Rider	Cal State Fullerton; Virginia	L 0–11; L 2–8
2009	Marist	Florida State; Ohio State	L 4–16; L 4–6
2010	Rider	Texas; Rice	L 0–11; L 1–19
2011	Manhattan	Florida; Jacksonville	L 3–17; L 4–5
2012	Manhattan	South Carolina; Coastal Carolina	L 0–7; L 1–11
2013	Canisius	North Carolina; Florida Atlantic	L 3–6; L 6–14
2014	Siena	TCU; Dallas Baptist; Sam Houston St.	L 1–2; W 9–8; L 2–9
2015	Canisius	Missouri State; Oregon	L 1–14; L 6–12
2016	Fairfield	Texas Tech; Dallas Baptist	L 1–12; L 5–8
2017	Marist	Florida; Bethune-Cookman	L 6–10; L 2–4
2018	Canisius	Minnesota; Gonzaga	L 1–10; L 2–8
2019	Quinnipiac	East Carolina; Campbell; East Carolina	W 5–4; L 8–9; L 3–13
2021	Rider Fairfield	Louisiana Tech; Alabama; Arizona State; Southern; Arizona State; Texas	L 2–18; L 1–3; L 6–7; W 6–2; W 9–7; L 2–12
2022	Canisius	Miami; Arizona	L 6-11; L 5-7
2023	Rider	Coastal Carolina; Duke; Coastal Carolina	W 11-10*; L 1-2; L 5-13
2024	Niagara	Oklahoma St. Nebraska	L 7-19; L 5-7
2025	Fairfield	Coastal Carolina; Florida	L 2-10; L 2-17
2026	Rider	Florida; Troy	L 7-8; L 7-15

'*' Extra Innings

== Softball ==
=== Champions ===
Year	Champion(s)
1984	Iona
1985	Iona
1986	Army
1987	LaSalle
1988	Army
1989	LaSalle
1990	LaSalle
1991	Fairfield
1992	LaSalle
1993	Canisius
1994	Canisius
1995	Canisius
1996	Canisius
1997	Canisius
1998	Niagara
1999	Manhattan
2000	Canisius
2001	Saint Peter's
2002	Canisius
2003	Rider
2004	Canisius
2005	Canisius
2006	Marist
2007	Canisius
2008	Canisius
2009	Canisius
2010	Iona
2011	Iona
2012	Iona
2013	Marist
2014	Iona
2015	Fairfield
2016	Marist
2017	Fairfield
2018	Monmouth
2019	Monmouth
2020	Canceled due to COVID-19
2021	Manhattan
2022	Canisius
2023	Marist
2024	Siena
2025	Marist
2026	Marist

==== Postseason history ====
NCAA tournament (4–58)
Year	MAAC Rep.	Opponent	Result
1994	Canisius	Arizona; Rutgers; Texas Tech	L 0–7; W 4-3*; L 1–5
1998	Niagara	Arizona; Hawaii	L 0–14; L 1–5
1999	Manhattan	Southwestern Louisiana; LIU Brooklyn	L 0–15; L 3–4*
2000	Canisius	UCLA; Bethune-Cokkman; Iowa	L 0–8; W 3–2*; L 1–2*
2001	Saint Peter's	Arizona; Texas Tech	L 2-4; L 2-3
2002	Canisius	Michigan; Central Michigan	L 0-5; L 0-3
2003	Rider	Cal State Fullerton; San Diego	L 0–3; L 1–2
2004	Canisius	Michigan; DePaul	L 3–6; L 0–8
2005	Canisius	Michigan; North Carolina	L 1–8; L 0–3
2006	Marist	Arizona; Auburn	L 0-9; L 0-14
2007	Canisius	Virginia Tech; Cal State Fullerton	L 0-5; L 0-8
2008	Canisius	Arizona; Long Island; Hofstra	L 0–11; W 3-2; L 1–5
2009	Canisius	Ohio State; Kentucky	L 2-3; L 0–7
2010	Iona	Texas; East Carolina	L 0–6; L 0–3
2011	Iona	Oklahoma; Missouri State	L 1–7; L 2–4
2012	Iona	California; Boston University	L 0–8; L 3–4
2013	Marist	Oklahoma; Forham	L 0–17; L 3–5
2014	Iona	Washington; Northwestern	L 0–8; L 4–14
2015	FairField	Alabama; USC Upstate	L 0–8; L 0–9
2016	Marist	Tennessee; Ohio State	L 2–10; L 1–6
2017	Fairfield	LSU; McNeese State	L 1–2; L 2–6
2018	Monmouth	Tennessee; Ohio	L 0–9; L 0–4
2019	Monmouth	LSU; Louisiana Tech	L 0–2; L 0–1
2021	Manhattan	Arkansas; Stanford	L 0–8; L 2–11
2022	Canisius	Florida; Wisconsin	L 1-10; L 0-3
2023	Marist	Florida State; South Carolina	L 0-9; L 1-2
2024	Siena	Texas; Saint Francis (PA)	L 0-5; L 0-1
2025	Marist	Liberty; Saint Francis; Texas A&M	L 5-10; W 8-0; L 4-17
2026	Marist	Texas Tech; Boston University	L 3-10; L 2-10

'*' Extra Innings

== Soccer ==
=== Men's ===
Year	Regular Season Champ	Tournament Champ	Offensive/Overall Player the Year/Golden Boot	Defensive of the Year	Goalkeeper of the Year/Golden Gloves	Coach of the Year
1988	Army (13–5–1 overall, 6–1–0 MAAC)	Army	David Hauck (Army)			Joe Chiavaro (Army)
1989	Loyola (10–5–2 overall, 5–0–0 MAAC)	Loyola	John Brence (Army)			Bill Sento (Loyola)
1990	Loyola (16–2–5 overall, 8–0–0 MAAC)	Loyola	Doug Miller (Loyola)			Bill Sento (Loyola)
1991	Loyola (12–8–2 overall, 8–0–0 MAAC)	Loyola	Tom Donahue (Loyola)			Dejan Cokic (Fairfield)
1992	Loyola (16–4–1 overall, 6–1–0 MAAC)	Loyola	Jim McElderry (Fairfield)			Dejan Cokic (Fairfield)
1993	Loyola (19–3–1 overall, 7–0–0 MAAC)	Loyola	Jim McElderry (Fairfield)			Bill Sento (Loyola)
1994	Loyola (15–5–2 overall, 6–1–0 MAAC)	Loyola	Bill Wnek (Loyola)			Gerry McKeown (Saint Peter's)
1995	Loyola (15–6–0 overall, 7–0–0 MAAC)	Loyola	Chris Doyle (Loyola)			Bobby Herodes (Iona)
1996	Canisius (5–12–2 overall, 4–1–2 MAAC)	Loyola	Tony Burke (Canisius)			Paul James (Niagara)
1997	Rider (15–6–1 overall, 8–1–0 MAAC)	Rider	Craig Wicken (Rider)			Mike Jacobs (Marist)
1998	Fairfield (15–4–1 overall, 7–1–1 MAAC)	Rider	Christof Lindenmayer (Loyola) Craig Wicken (Rider)			Carl Rees (Fairfield)
1999	Loyola (13–6–2 overall, 7–1–1 MAAC)	Fairfield	Christof Lindenmayer (Loyola)			Bill Sento (Loyola)
2000	Loyola (12–4–2 overall, 9–0–0 MAAC)	Marist	Joseph Crespo (Marist)			Mark Mettrick, Loyola
2001	Loyola (17–2–2 overall, 9–0–0 MAAC)	Loyola	Niall Lepper (Loyola)		Reb Beatty (Loyola)	Mark Mettrick (Loyola)
2002	Loyola (13–5–3 overall, 8–0–1 MAAC)	Loyola	Niall Lepper (Loyola)		Reb Beatty (Loyola)	Bobby Herodes (Marist)
2003	Loyola (11–7–3 overall, 6–2–1 MAAC)	Saint Peter's	Omar Alfonso (Loyola)	Alex Cunliffe (Fairfield) Fabian Lewis (Canisius)		Cesar Markovic (Saint Peter's)
2004	Loyola (11–6–1 overall, 9–0–0 MAAC)	Marist	Douglas Narvaez (Saint Peter's)	Ben Castor (Marist)		Mark Mettrick (Loyola)
2005	Fairfield (13–4–3 overall, 8–0–1 MAAC)	Marist	Matt Stedman (Niagara)	Ben Castor (Marist)		Dermot McGrane (Niagara)
2006	Fairfield (15–6–1 overall, 7–2–0 MAAC)	Fairfield	Juan Gaviria (Saint Peter's)	Tom Skara (Fairfield)		Dermot McGrane (Niagara)
2007	Loyola 19–3–1 overall, 8–1–0 MAAC)	Loyola	Murphy Wiredu (Saint Peter's)	Tennant McVea (Loyola)		Mark Mettrick (Loyola)
2008	Loyola (18–2–1 overall, 9–0–0 MAAC)	Fairfield	Jamie Darvill (Loyola)	Tennant McVea (Loyola)		Mark Mettrick (Loyola)
2009	Iona (14–2–2 overall, 8–1–0 MAAC)	Loyola	Jamie Darvill (Loyola)	Tennant McVea (Loyola)		Fernando Barboto (Iona)
2010	Saint Peter's (13–6–1 overall, 7–1–1 MAAC)	Saint Peter's	Emery Welshman (Siena)	Assaf Sheleg (Saint Peter's)		Guy Abrahamson (Saint Peter's)
2011	Fairfield (12–5–1 overall, 8–0–1 MAAC)	Fairfield	Carl Haworth (Niagara)	Michael O'Keeffe (Fairfield)		Carl Rees (Fairfield)
2012	Loyola (13–6–1 overall, 7–1–1 MAAC)	Niagara	Sindre Ek (Siena)	Rene DeZorzi (Niagara)	Brett Petricek (Niagara)	Gareth Elliott (Siena)
2013	Monmouth (8–6–5 overall, 7–1–2 MAAC)	Quinnipiac	Franklin Castellanos (Iona)	Matt Jeffery (Monmouth)	Borja Angoitia (Quinnipiac)	Jorden Scott (Manhattan)
2014	Quinnipiac (10–4–5 overall, 7–0–3 MAAC)	Monmouth	Ignacio Maganto (Iona)	Matt Jeffery (Monmouth)	Borja Angoitia (Quinnipiac)	Eric Da Costa (Quinnipiac)
2015	Monmouth (11–3–4 overall, 7–0–3 MAAC)	Rider	Marcos Nunez (Iona)	David Acuna Camacho (Monmouth)	Eric Klenofsky (Monmouth)	Robert McCourt (Monmouth)
2016	Quinnipiac (13–7–0 overall, 8–2–0 MAAC)	Rider	Cameron Harr (Marist)	Thomas Teupen (Canisius)	Eric Klenofsky (Monmouth); Ryan Baird (Rider)	Eric Da Costa (Quinnipiac)
2017	Fairfield (12–4–3 overall, 7–1–2 MAAC)	Fairfield	Allen Gavilanes (Marist)	Alex Grattarola (Canisius)	Marcellin Gohier (Manhattan)	Carl Rees (Fairfield)
2018	Fairfield (11–5–2 overall, 8–0–2 MAAC)	Rider	Eamon Whelan (Quinnipiac)	Jonas Vergin (Fairfield)	Gordon Botterill (Fairfield)	Carl Rees (Fairfield)
2019	Saint Peter's (13–6 overall, 9–1 MAAC)	Iona	Dominic Laws (Saint Peter's)	Malcolm Moreno (Iona)	Samuel Ilin (Marist)	Julian Richens (Saint Peter's)
2020^	Quinnipiac (7–2 overall, 5–1 MAAC)	Monmouth	Dominic Laws (Saint Peter's)	George Akampeke (Monmouth)	Sean Murray (Monmouth); Jared Mazzola (Quinnipiac); Gordon Botterill (Fairfield)	Robert McCourt (Monmouth)
2021	Marist (12–6–3 overall, 7–2-1 MAAC)	Marist	Zaki Alibou (Rider)	Huib Achterkamp (Marist)	Sam Ilin (Marist)	Matt Viggiano (Marist)
2022	Quinnipiac (11-4-3 overall, 8–0-1 MAAC)	Quinnipiac	David Bercedo (Quinnipiac)	Nassim Akki (Manhattan)	Greg Monroe (Siena)	Eric Da Costa (Quinnipiac)
2023	Iona (12-4 overall, 9-1 MAAC)	Rider	Camil Azzam Ruiz (Iona)	Tim Timchenko (Iona)	Nacho Alfaro Monge (Iona)	James Hamilton (Iona)
2024	Iona (8-4-3 overall, 6-1-1 MAAC); Rider (12-4-1 overall, 6-1-1 MAAC)	Iona	Momo Diop (Rider)	Tim Timchenko (Iona)	Adam Salama (Rider)	Chad Duernberger (Rider)
2025	Sacred Heart (8-3-5 overall, 7-0-3 MAAC)	Siena	Tim Strele (Saint Peter's)	Daniel Losfablos (Sacred Heart)	Luca Marinelli (Sacred Heart)	Anthony Anzevui (Sacred Heart)

^ Tournament delayed until April 2021 due to Covid

=== Women's ===
Year	Regular Season Champ	Tournament Champ	Overall/Offensive Player of the Year/Golden Boot	Defensive of the Year	Goalkeeper of the Year/Golden Glove	Coach of the Year
1992		Iona				
1993		Fairfield	Stacy Wagenseil (Canisius)			Debbie Belkin (Fairfield)
1994	Loyola (11–10–0 overall, 6–1–0 MAAC)	Loyola	Stacy Wagenseil (Canisius); Val Kujan (Siena)			Glenn Crooks (Saint Peter's); Dave Gerrity (Loyola)
1995	Loyola (10–6–4 overall, 6–1–0 MAAC)	Fairfield	Kelli Hurley (Fairfield)	Erin Gilroy (Loyola)		Dave Gerrity (Loyola)
1996		Loyola	Nicole Tracey (Saint Peter's)	Erin Gilroy (Loyola)		Scott Sylvester (Saint Peter's)
1997		Fairfield	Abby Allen (Fairfield)			Maria Piechocki (Fairfield)
1998		Fairfield	Abby Allen (Fairfield)			Maria Piechocki (Fairfield)
1999	Loyola (13–4–1 overall, 8–0–1 MAAC)	Fairfield	Pam Cluff (Fairfield)	Julie Kapcala (Loyola)		Peter Veltri (Niagara)
2000	Loyola (15–5–0, 9–0–0 MAAC)	Loyola	Pam Cluff (Fairfield)	Julie Kapcala (Loyola)		Joe Mallia (Loyola)
2001		Loyola	Julie Anne Forman (Fairfield)			Megan McGonagle (Marist); Steve Karbowski (Siena)
2002	Fairfield (9–7–3 overall, 8–0–1 MAAC)	Loyola	Rosie Luzak (Niagara)	Noel Cox (Siena)		Steve Karbowski (Siena)
2003	Loyola (12–9–1 overall, 8–0–1 MAAC)	Loyola	Tami Coyle (Rider)	Lindsay Tracey (Loyola); Katy Owings (Niagara)		Peter Veltri (Niagara)
2004	Loyola (16–4–0 overall, 9–0–0 MAAC)	Loyola	Ali Andrzejewski (Loyola)	Lisa Jaffa (Loyola); Noel Cox (Siena)		Emma Hayes (Iona)
2005	Loyola (15–5–0 overall, 9–0–0 MAAC)	Fairfield	Ali Andrzejewski (Loyola)	Sarra Moller (Loyola)		Peter Veltri (Niagara)
2006	Loyola (10–7–2 overall, 8–1–0 MAAC)	Niagara	Kristen Turner (Siena)	Brett Maron (Fairfield)		John Byford (Loyola)
2007	Marist (11–5–3 overall, 7–1–1 MAAC)	Loyola	Brittany Bisnott (Niagara)	Brittany Henderson (Loyola)		Elizabeth Roper (Marist)
2008	Loyola (10–6–4 overall, 7–0–2 MAAC)	Fairfield	Ahna Johnson (Fairfield)	Sarra Moller (Loyola)		Jim Wendling (Canisius)
2009	Loyola (13–4–3 overall, 9–0–0 MAAC)	Loyola	Theresa Ferraina (Loyola)	Brittany Henderson (Loyola)		Katherine Vettori (Loyola)
2010	Canisius (14–7–0 overall, 7–2–0 MAAC)	Siena	Kelly Reinwald (Canisius); Nichole Schiro (Loyola)	Ashleigh Bowers (Niagara)		Drayson Hounsome (Rider)
2011	Marist (13–6–2 overall, 7–1–1 MAAC)	Marist	Nichole Schiro (Loyola)	Kelly Boudreau (Fairfield)		Katherine Lyn (Marist)
2012	Marist (15–7–0 overall, 8–1–0 MAAC)	Loyola	Nichole Schiro (Loyola)	Alli Walsh (Fairfield)	Didi Haracic (Loyola)	Jim O'Brien (Fairfield)
2013	Monmouth (16–1–2 overall, 8–0–2 MAAC)	Monmouth	Dana Costello (Monmouth)	Emma Pichl (Fairfield)	Ashley Lewis (Monmouth)	Krissy Turner (Monmouth)
2014	Monmouth(14–5–0 overall, 9–1–0 MAAC)	Rider	Tara Ballay (Rider)	Alexa Freguletti (Monmouth)	Taylor Booth (Siena)	Krissy Turner (Monmouth)
2015	Monmouth(15–4–2 overall, 9–1–0 MAAC)	Siena	Alexis McTamney (Monmouth)	Jenny Bitzer (Manhattan)	Kristen Skonieczny (Manhattan)	Brendan Lawler (Manhattan)
2016	Monmouth(14–5–2 overall, 9–0–1 MAAC)	Monmouth	Alexis McTamney (Monmouth)	Tara Sobierjaski (Siena)	Bethany-May Howard (Rider)	Krissy Turner (Monmouth)
2017	Monmouth(14–5–2 overall, 9–0–1 MAAC)	Monmouth	Erica Modena (Manhattan)	Gabriella Cuevas (Monmouth)	Amanda Knaub (Monmouth)	Krissy Turner (Monmouth)
2018	Monmouth(16–4–1 overall, 9–1–0 MAAC)	Monmouth	Madie Gibson (Monmouth)	Jessica Johnson (Monmouth)	Taylor Dorado (Siena)	Leigh Howard (Marist)
2019	Monmouth(14-2-3 overall, 10–0 MAAC)	Monmouth	Lexie Palladino (Monmouth)	Anna Lazur (Monmouth)	Amanda Knaub (Monmouth)	David Barrett (Fairfield)
2020^	Siena (6-0-2 overall, 4–0-1 MAAC)	Siena	Makenzie Rodrigues (Rider); Lauren Karabin (Monmouth)	Sarina Jones (Monmouth); Brianna Montinard (Siena)	Leslie Adams (Siena)	Steve Karbowski (Siena)
2021	Monmouth (15-4-1 overall, 8-1-1 MAAC)	Monmouth	Florence Vaillancourt (Niagara)	Sarina Jones (Monmouth)	Natalie Kelchner (Marist)	Dr. Krissy Turner (Monmouth)
2022	Quinnipiac (15-2-1 overall, 9-1-0 MAAC); Fairfield (14-4-0 overall, 9-1-0 MAAC)	Quinnipiac	Rebecca Cooke (Quinnipiac)	Maddie Mills (FairField)	Ellie Sciancalepore (Rider)	Ryan Louis (Canisius)
2023	Quinnipiac (13-4-1 overall, 9-0-1 MAAC)	Quinnipiac	Courtney Chochol (Quinnipiac)	Markela Bejleri, Kayla Mingachos, Olivia Scott (Quinnipiac)	Sofia Lospinoso (Quinnipiac)	Dave Clarke (Quinnipiac)
2024	Fairfield (15-2-1 overall, 10-1-1 MAAC)	Fairfield	Maddy Theriault (Fairfield)	Alicia Zamora (Canisius)	Sofia Lospinoso (Quinnipiac)	David Barrett (Fairfield)
2025	Fairfield (15-1-2 overall, 10-0-2 MAAC)	Sacred Heart	Maddy Theriault (Fairfield)	Meghan Carragher (Fairfield)	Katie Wright (Fairfield)	David Barrett (Fairfield)

^ Tournament delayed until April 2021 due to Covid

== Lacrosse ==
=== Men's ===
Year	Champion
2000	St. Joseph's
2001	Mount Saint Mary's
2002	Manhattan
2003	Mount Saint Mary's (2)
2004	Providence
2005	Marist
2006	Providence (2)
2007	Providence (3)
2008	Canisius
2009	Siena
2010	Mount Saint Mary's (3)
2011	Siena (2)
2012	Canisius (2)
2013	Detroit Mercy
2014	Siena (3)
2015	Marist (2)
2016	Quinnipiac
2017	Monmouth
2018	Canisius (3)
2019	Marist (3)
2020	Not Awarded
2021	Monmouth (2)
2022	Manhattan (2)
2022	Manhattan (2)
2023	Marist (4)
2024	Sacred Heart
2025	Siena (4)
2026	Marist (5)

=== Women's ===
Year	Champion
2000	Manhattan
2001	Fairfield
2002	Le Moyne
2003	Le Moyne (2)
2004	Manhattan (2)
2005	Manhattan (3)
2006	Le Moyne (3)
2007	Le Moyne (4)
2008	Marist
2009	Fairfield (2)
2010	Marist (2)
2011	Canisius
2012	Canisius (2)
2013	Canisius (3)
2014	Canisius (4)
2015	Fairfield (3)
2016	Canisius (5)
2017	Canisius (6)
2018	Fairfield (4)
2019	Fairfield (5)
2020	Not Awarded
2021	Fairfield (6)
2022	Fairfield (7)
2023	Fairfield (8)
2024	Niagara
2025	Fairfield (9)
2026	Fairfield (10)

== Swimming and diving ==
=== Conference champions ===
Year	Men's champion	Women's champion
1984	La Salle	La Salle
1985	La Salle	Army
1986	La Salle	La Salle
1987	Army	Army
1988	Army	Army
1989	La Salle	Army
1990	La Salle	Army
1991	La Salle	La Salle
1992	La Salle	La Salle
1993	Iona	Loyola
1994	Niagara	Loyola
1995	Loyola	Loyola
1996	Marist	Loyola
1997	Marist	Marist
1998	Marist	Marist
1999	Marist	Marist
2000	Marist	Marist
2001	Marist	Rider
2002	Marist	Marist
2003	Marist	Rider
2004	Rider	Marist
2005	Marist	Marist
2006	Marist	Marist
2007	Marist	Marist
2008	Marist	Marist
2009	Loyola	Rider
2010	Loyola	Marist
2011	Loyola	Marist
2012	Rider	Marist
2013	Rider	Marist
2014	Rider	Marist
2015	Rider	Marist
2016	Rider	Marist
2017	Rider	Marist
2018	Rider	Fairfield
2019	Rider	Fairfield
2020	Rider	Fairfield
2022	Rider	Niagara
2023	Rider	Fairfield
2024	Marist	Niagara
2025	Niagara	Niagara
2026	Fairfield	Fairfield

== Cross country ==
=== Champions ===
Year	Men's champion	Women's champion
1981	Iona	
1982	Iona	
1983	Iona	Holy Cross
1984	La Salle	Holy Cross
1985	Iona	Holy Cross
1986	Army	Manhattan
1987	Army	Fordham
1988	Iona	Fordham
1989	La Salle	Fordham
1990	La Salle	Canisius
1991	Iona	Canisius
1992	Iona	Canisius
1993	Iona	Manhattan
1994	Iona	Manhattan
1995	Iona	Canisius
1996	Iona	Manhattan
1997	Iona	Canisius
1998	Iona	Marist
1999	Iona	Manhattan
2000	Iona	Marist
2001	Iona	Iona
2002	Iona	Manhattan
2003	Iona	Loyola
2004	Iona	Marist
2005	Iona	Iona
2006	Iona	Iona
2007	Iona	Iona
2008	Iona	Iona
2009	Iona	Iona
2010	Iona	Iona
2011	Iona	Iona
2012	Iona	Iona
2013	Iona	Iona
2014	Iona	Iona
2015	Iona	Quinnipiac
2016	Iona	Iona
2017	Iona	Iona
2018	Iona	Iona
2019	Iona	Iona
2020	Iona	Iona
2021	Iona	Iona
2022	Iona	Quinnipiac
2023	Iona	Quinnipiac
2024	Iona	Quinnipiac
2025	Iona	Quinnipiac

== Volleyball ==
=== Women's ===
Year	Regular Season Champ	Tournament Champ	Most Outstanding/Valuable Player
1990	La Salle	Saint Peter's	Dana Shepherd (La Salle); Jen Wutzer (La Salle)
1991	La Salle	Loyola	Tara Vinje (Loyola)
1992	Loyola	Loyola	Tara Vinje (Loyola)
1993	Siena	Siena	Jeanine Bula (Siena)
1994	Siena	Siena	Rochelle Travers (Siena)
1995		Siena	Rochelle Travers (Siena)
1996	Fairfield	Siena	Donna DeFrancesco (Siena)
1997	Fairfield	Fairfield	Jen McLaughlin (Fairfield)
1998	Fairfield	Fairfield	Jen McLaughlin (Fairfield)
1999	Fairfield	Fairfield	Corrine Carlson (Fairfield)
2000	Fairfield	Fairfield	Joanne Saunders (Fairfield)
2001	Saint Peter's	Fairfield	Laurie Brands (Fairfield)
2002	Manhattan	Manhattan	Goedele Van Cauteren (Manhattan)
2003	Manhattan	Manhattan	Goedele Van Cauteren (Manhattan)
2004	Fairfield	Iona	Miki Hogg (Iona)
2005	Fairfield	Siena	Christie Gustafson (Siena)
2006	Fairfield (24–8 overall, 18-0 MAAC)	Siena	Christie Gustafson (Siena)
2007	Siena (24–8 overall, 17-1 MAAC)	Siena	Nadiege Honore (Siena)
2008	Fairfield (20–13 overall, 16-2 MAAC)	Siena	Burgandy McCurty (Siena)
2009	Fairfield (19–12 overall, 16-2 MAAC)	Niagara	Hannah Hedrick (Niagara)
2010	Niagara (25–9 overall, 17-1 MAAC)	Niagara	Hannah Hedrick (Niagara)
2011	Niagara (25–9 overall, 17-1 MAAC)	Niagara	Kari Honomichl (Niagara)
2012	Fairfield (22–9 overall, 15-3 MAAC)	Fairfield	Brianna Dixion (Fairfield)
2013	Marist (19–13 overall, 14-4 MAAC); Fairfield (21–9 overall, 14-4 MAAC)	Fairfield	Rachel Romansky (Fairfield)
2014	Marist (25–6 overall, 15-3 MAAC)	Siena	Rachel Stoklosa (Siena)
2015	Fairfield (21–10 overall, 14-4 MAAC)	Fairfield	Megan Theiller (Fairfield)
2016	Fairfield (28–6 overall, 18-0 MAAC)	Fairfield	Megan O'Sullivan (Fairfield)
2017	Fairfield (25–7 overall, 18-0 MAAC)	Fairfield	Skyler Day (Fairfield)
2018	Iona (20–7 overall, 16-2 MAAC)	Iona	Mia Bonsignore (Iona)
2019	Fairfield (24–6 overall, 17-1 MAAC)	Fairfield	Manuela Nicolini (Fairfield)
2020^	Fairfield (9-1 overall, 9-1 MAAC)	Rider	Anilee Sher (Rider)
2021	Fairfield (24-9 overall, 16-2 MAAC)	Fairfield	K.J. Johnson (Fairfield)
2022	Fairfield (26-7 overall, 17-1 MAAC)	Quinnipac	Aryanah Diaz (Quinnipac)
2023	Fairfield (23-7 overall, 16-2 MAAC)	Fairfield	Maya Walker (Fairfield)
2024	Fairfield (21-11 overall, 17-1 MAAC)	Fairfield	Mamie Krubally (Fairfield)
2025	Fairfield (23-5 overall, 17-1 MAAC)	Fairfield	Kiannisha Santiago (Rider)

^ Tournament delayed until April 2021 due to Covid

==== Postseason history ====
NCAA tournament (1–32)
Year	MAAC Rep.	Opponent	Result
1994	Siena	Princeton	L 0–3
1995	Siena	Colgate; Georgia Tech	W 3–1; L 0–3
1996	Siena	Hofstra	L 1–3
1997	Fairfield	Ohio State	L 0–3
1998	Fairfield	Clemson	L 0–3
1999	Fairfield	Michigan	L 0–3
2000	Fairfield	Pepperdine	L 1–3
2001	Fairfield	Penn State	L 0–3
2002	Manhattan	Temple	L 1–3
2003	Manhattan	Pepperdine	L 0–3
2004	Iona	Nebraska	L 0–3
2005	Siena	Washington	L 0–3
2006	Siena	Minnesota	L 0–3
2007	Siena	Penn State	L 0–3
2008	Siena	California	L 0–3
2009	Niagara	Michigan	L 0–3
2010	Niagara	Penn State	L 0–3
2011	Niagara	Northern Iowa	L 0–3
2012	Fairfield	USC	L 0–3
2013	Fairfield	Nebraska	L 0–3
2014	Siena	Penn State	L 0–3
2015	Fairfield	Texas	L 0–3
2016	Fairfield	Michigan State	L 0–3
2017	Fairfield	Texas	L 0–3
2018	Iona	Pittsburgh	L 0–3
2019	Fairfield	Minnesota	L 0–3
2020	Rider	UCLA	L 0–3
2021	Fairfield	UCLA	L 0–3
2022	Quinnipiac	Wisconsin	L 0–3
2023	Fairfield	Purdue	L 0–3
2024	Fairfield	Wisconsin	L 0–3
2025	Fairfield	Minnesota	L 0–3

== Football ==
The MAAC Football League was formed before the 1993 season, but it was discontinued following the 2007 season.

At its peak in 1997, it consisted of 10 teams:

- Canisius (1993-2002, discontinued football after 2002 season)
- Duquesne (1994-2007, joined Northeast Conference after 2007 season)
- Fairfield (1996-2002, discontinued football after 2002 season)
- Georgetown (1993-1999, joined Patriot League after 1999 season)
- Iona (1993-2007, became independent, discontinued football after 2008 season)
- La Salle (1997-2007, discontinued football after 2007 season)
- Marist (1994-2007, became independent, joined Pioneer Football League after 2008 season)
- St. John's (1993-1997, became independent, joined Northeast Conference after 1999 season, discontinued football after 2002 season)
- Saint Peter's (1993-2006, discontinued football after 2006 season)
- Siena (1993-2003, discontinued football after 2003 season)

=== Champions ===
- 1993 Iona (5-0-0)
- 1994 Marist (6-1) & St. John's (6-1)
- 1995 Duquesne (7-0)
- 1996 Duquesne (8-0)
- 1997 Georgetown (7-0)
- 1998 Fairfield (7-1) & Georgetown (7-1)
- 1999 Duquesne (7-1)
- 2000 Duquesne (7-0)
- 2001 Duquesne (6-0)
- 2002 Duquesne (8-0)
- 2003 Duquesne (5-0)
- 2004 Duquesne (4-0)
- 2005 Duquesne (4-0)
- 2006 Duquesne (3-1) & Marist (3-1)
- 2007 Duquesne, Iona & Marist (all 2-1)

== Ice hockey ==
=== History ===
The MAAC began sponsoring hockey in 1997 due to NCAA regulations that required all Division I conferences to participate in all Division sports. At the founding of the MAAC hockey conference, only three of the eight founding teams were full members of the conference: Canisius, Fairfield, and Iona. The MAAC also added five associate members: American International, Connecticut, Holy Cross, Quinnipiac, and Sacred Heart (at the time Quinnipiac and Sacred Heart were not members of the MAAC, though they would join the conference as full members later on). The conference began play starting with the 1998–99 season, where Quinnipiac and Holy Cross won the inaugural regular season and conference tournament championships, respectively. The MAAC added two additional teams starting with the 1999–00 season: Mercyhurst and Bentley. Army joined the conference for the 2000–01 season, bringing the conference up to eleven member teams. At the conclusion of the 2002–03 season, Fairfield and Iona both discontinued their men's ice hockey programs, and while the conference's remaining nine teams could continue without them, having only one full member necessitated the folding of the MAAC hockey conference as MAAC rules only allowed full conference members to vote in new decisions, leaving almost all MAAC hockey members without a voice in conference decisions pertinent to hockey. The following year all of the teams continued their programs in the newly formed Atlantic Hockey conference. As of the 2025–26 athletic season, five current MAAC members sponsor ice hockey, spread across the AHA, ECAC, and Hockey East conferences.

=== Ice hockey membership timeline ===
MAAC ice hockey membership often varied significantly from normal conference membership, with the majority of schools being associate members.

Full members Associate members

=== Champions ===
Season	Regular Season Champion	Tournament Champion
1998-99	Quinnipiac	Holy Cross
1999-00	Quinnipiac	Connecticut
2000-01	Mercyhurst	Mercyhurst
2001-02	Mercyhurst	Quinnipiac
2002-03	Mercyhurst	Mercyhurst

School	Regular Season Championships	Tournament Championships
Connecticut	0	1
Holy Cross	0	1
Mercyhurst	3	2
Quinnipiac	2	1

== Notable sports figures ==
Some of the notable sport figures who played collegiately and/or graduated from a MAAC school, include:

=== Baseball ===
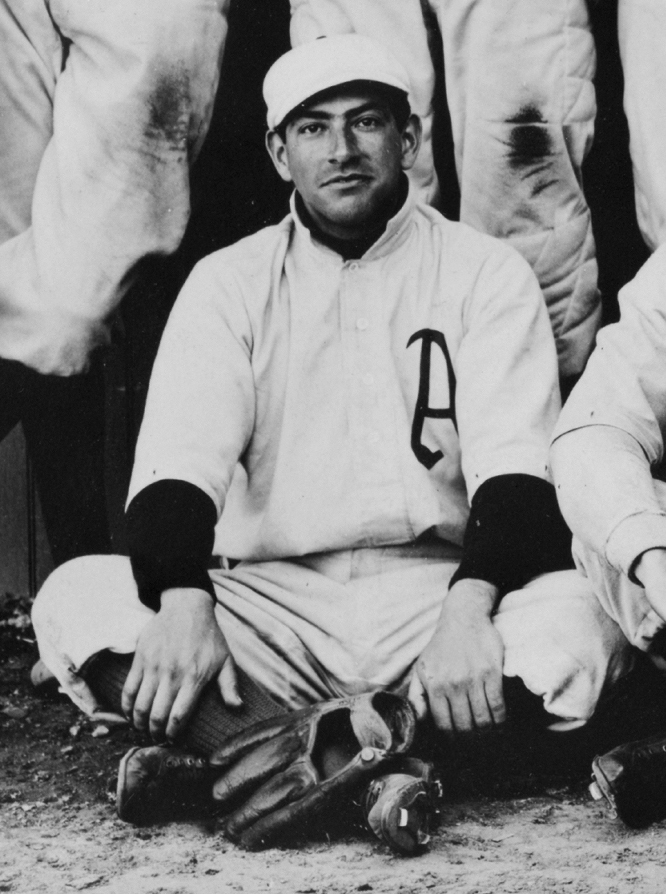
Luis Castro
1st Hispanic in MLB
Manhattan

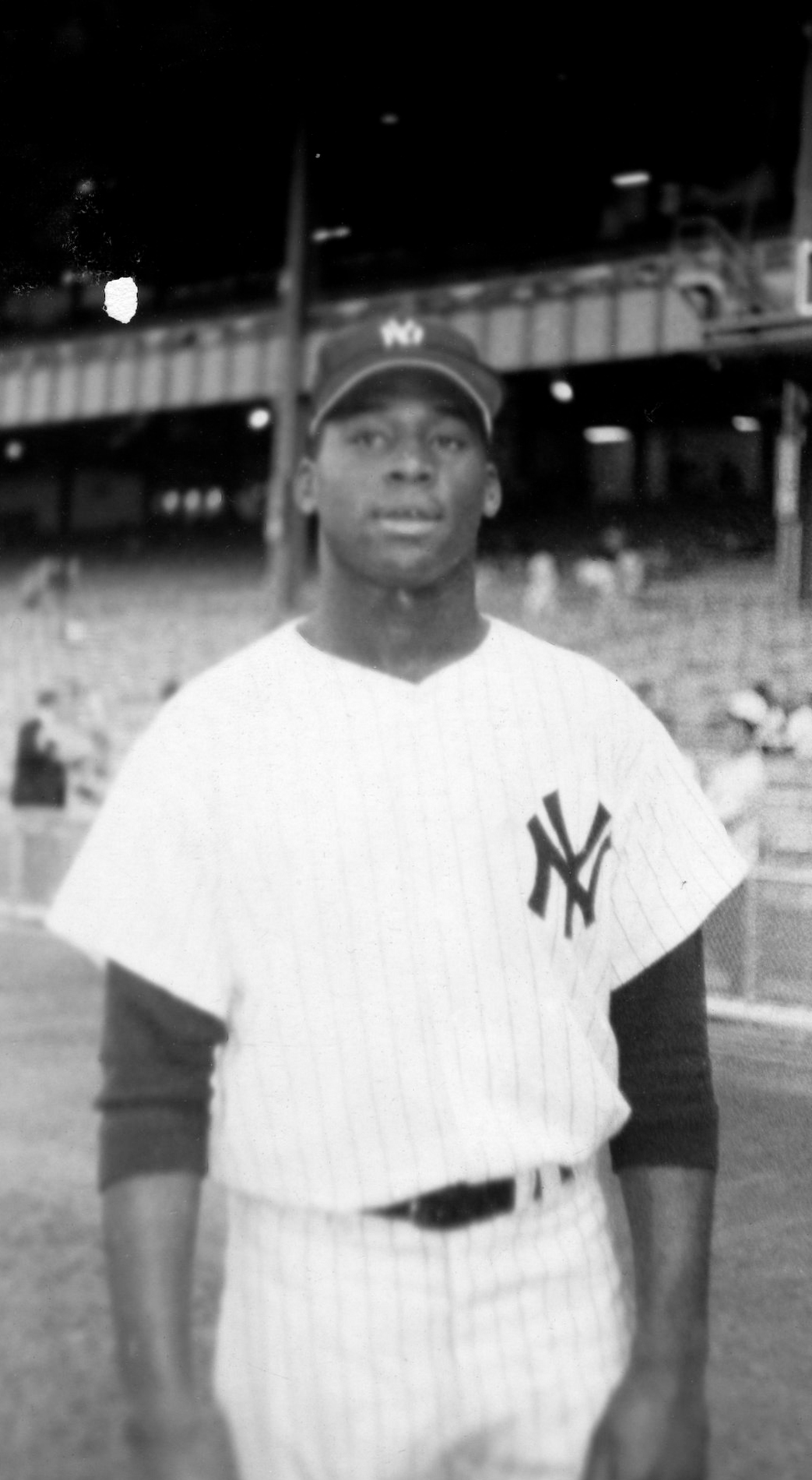
Al Downing
MLB All-Star Pitcher
Rider

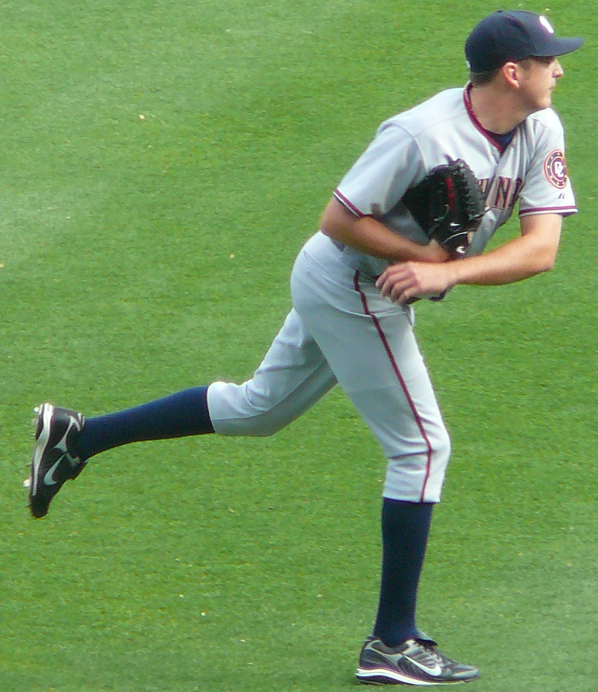
John Lannan
MLB Pitcher
Siena

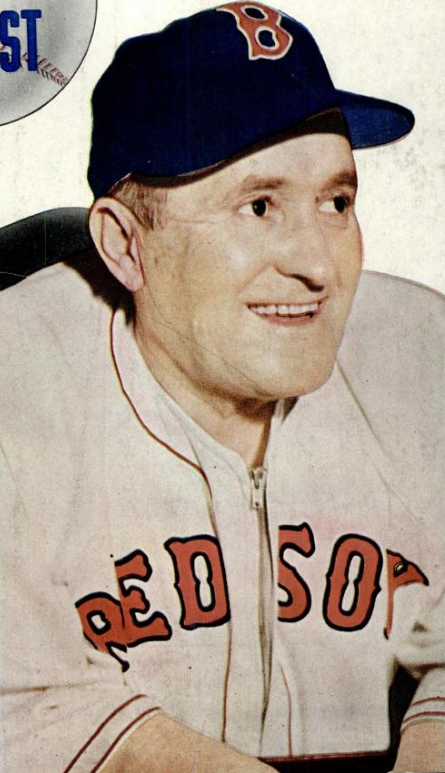
Joe McCarthy
Hall of Fame MLB Manager
Niagara

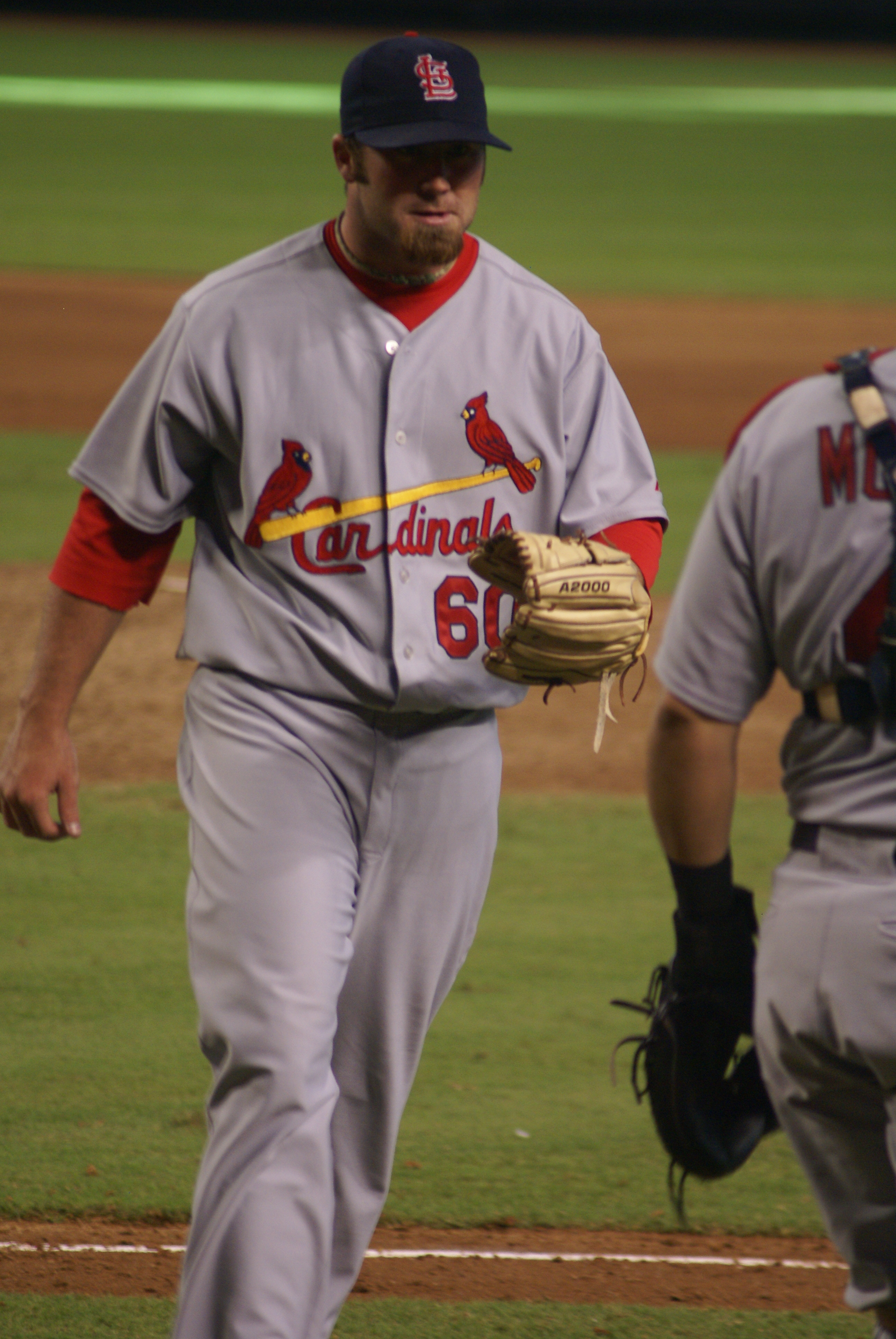
Jason Motte
MLB Pitcher
Iona
- Jack Armstrong, former MLB pitcher; 1990 MLB All-Star and World Champion (Rider)
- John Axford, former MLB pitcher (Canisius)
- Kevin Barry, former MLB pitcher (Rider)
- Shad Barry, former MLB player (Niagara)
- Chris Begg, pitcher for Team Canada at the 2004 Summer Olympics and World Baseball Classic (Niagara)
- Brad Brach, former relief pitcher (Monmouth)
- Frank Brooks, former MLB relief pitcher (Saint Peter's)
- Frank Cashen, former General Manager of the Baltimore Orioles and 1986 World Series Champion New York Mets (Loyola)
- Keefe Cato, former MLB pitcher (Fairfield)
- Tim Christman, former MLB relief pitcher (Siena)
- Harry Croft, former MLB player (Niagara)
- Pete Harnisch, MLB All-Star Pitcher (Fordham)
- Billy Harrell, former MLB infielder (Siena)
- Jim Hoey, former MLB relief pitcher (Rider)
- Gary Holle, former MLB first baseman (Siena)
- Miguel Jimenez, former MLB pitcher (Fordham)
- Jeff Kunkel, former MLB player; 3rd overall pick of the 1983 MLB Draft by the Texas Rangers (Rider)
- Sal Maglie, former starting pitcher (Niagara)
- Nick Margevicius, current starting pitcher for TSG Hawks (Rider)
- Joe McCarthy, former MLB catcher (Niagara)
- Rinty Monahan, former MLB player (Niagara)
- Ray Montgomery, former MLB player (Fordham)
- Danny Napoleon, former MLB outfielder (Rider)
- Mike Parisi, former MLB pitcher (Manhattan)
- Victor Santos, former MLB relief pitcher (Saint Peter's)
- Chuck Schilling, former MLB second baseman (Manhattan)
- Tom Waddell, former MLB pitcher (Manhattan)

=== Basketball ===
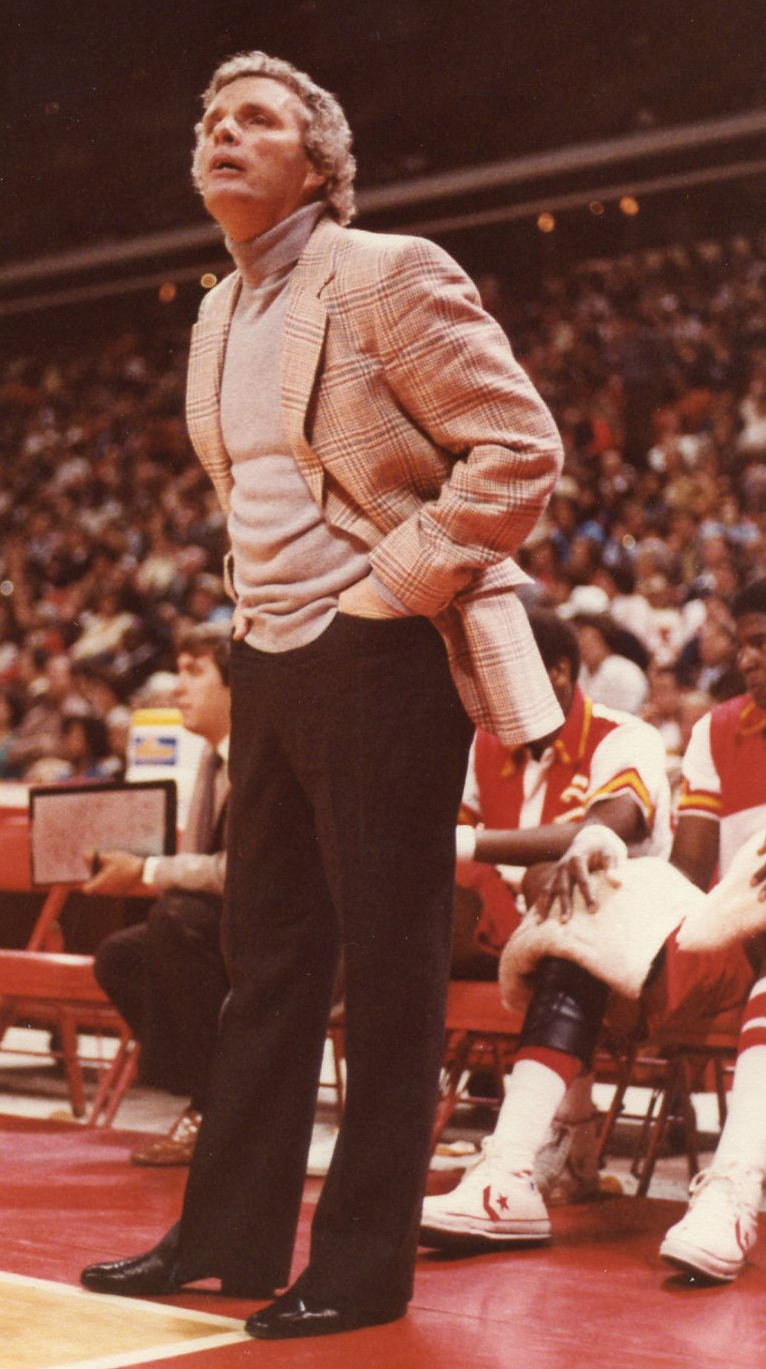
Hubie Brown,
Hall of Fame NBA Coach
Niagara

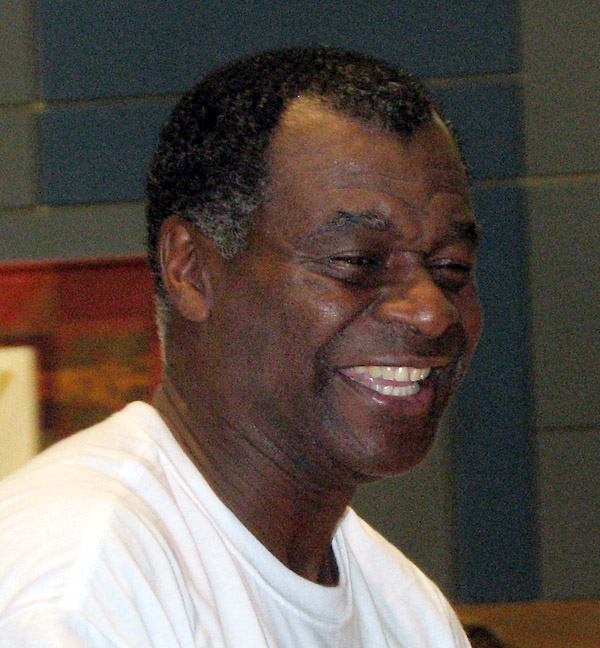
Calvin Murphy,
NBA All-Star Guard
Niagara

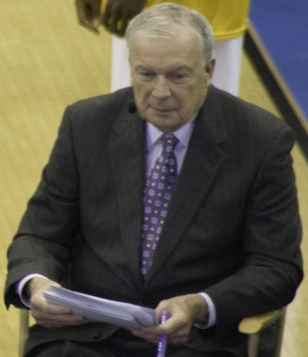
Digger Phelps,
ESPN NCAA Analyst
Rider

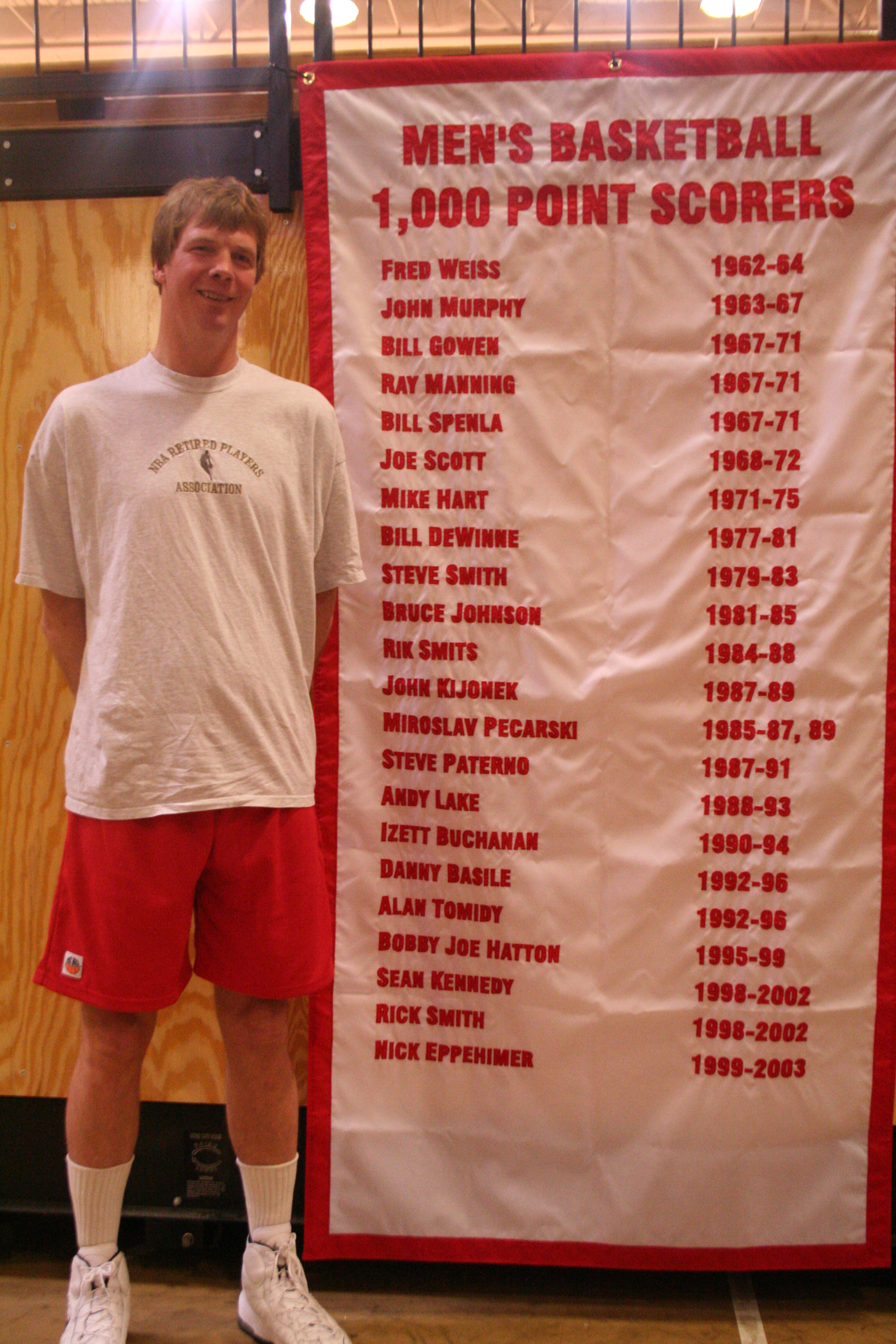
Rik Smits,
NBA All-Star Center
Marist

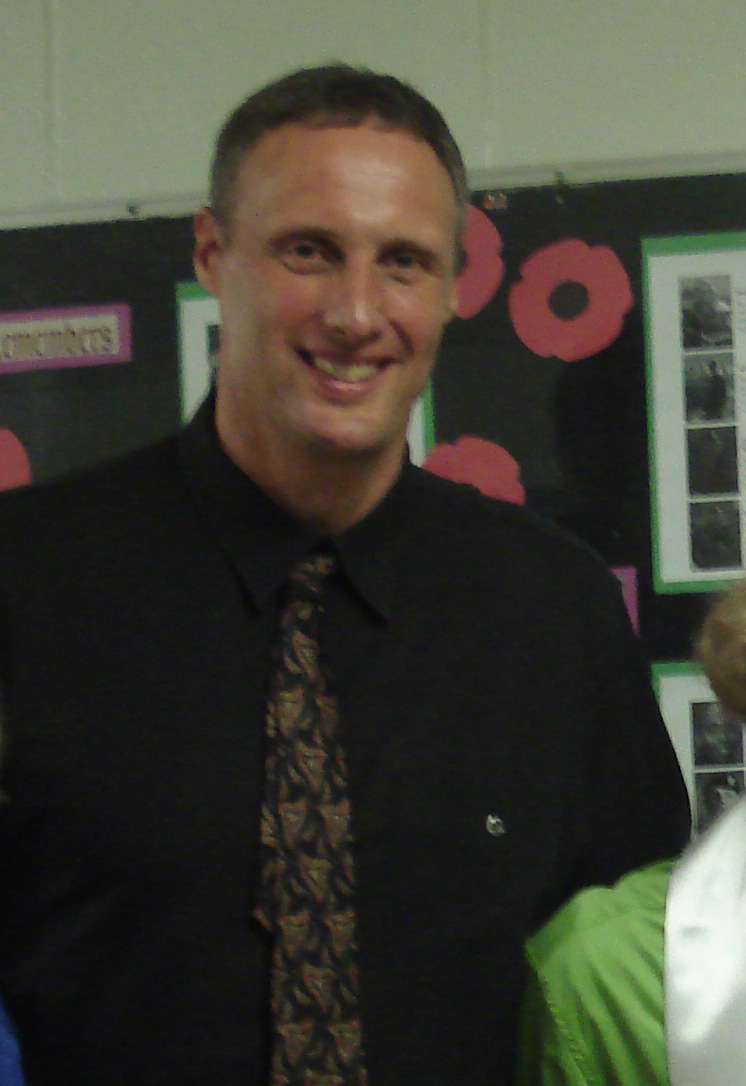
Mike Smrek
Two-Time NBA Champion
Canisius
- Joe Arlauckas, former NBA player (Niagara)
- John Beilein, former head coach of Cleveland Cavaliers and Michigan men's basketball (Canisius)
- Matt Brady, current Maryland assistant coach, former head coach of James Madison men's basketball (Siena)
- Steve Burtt, Sr., former NBA player (Iona)
- Al Butler, former NBA player (Niagara)
- Keydren Clark, two-time NCAA scoring leader; seventh all-time NCAA scoring leader (Saint Peter's)
- Larry Costello, former NBA player and coach; six-time NBA All-Star (Niagara)
- Joe DeSantis, former men's college basketball coach; 1979 NCAA All-American (Fairfield)
- Doug Edert, breakout star of Saint Peter's 2022 NCAA tournament run
- Kathy Fedorjaka, former Bucknell women's basketball coach (Fairfield)
- Luis Flores, former NBA player (Manhattan)
- Greg Francis, current Alberta men's basketball coach; former Canadian Olympic basketball player (Fairfield)
- Deng Gai, former NBA player; 2006 NCAA block shot leader (Fairfield)
- Sean Green, former NBA player (Iona)
- Kenny Hasbrouck, former NBA player (Siena)
- Bobby Joe Hatton – former professional basketball player; member of the Puerto Rico national basketball team at the 2004 Olympic Games (Marist)
- Stella Johnson, professional basketball player, drafted by Phoenix Mercury in 2020, played for Chicago Sky and Washington Mystics (Rider)
- Jared Jordan, professional basketball player in Europe, drafted by Los Angeles Clippers in 2007 (Marist)
- Frank Layden, former NBA coach and executive; NBA Coach of the Year and Executive of the Year (Niagara)
- Manny Leaks, former NBA player (Niagara)
- Tim Legler, former NBA player; current ESPN analyst (La Salle)
- Ralph Lewis, former NBA player (La Salle)
- Bob MacKinnon, former NBA Head Coach and General Manager of the New Jersey Nets (Canisius)
- Johnny McCarthy, member of the 1963–64 NBA Champion Boston Celtics and first of just three players in NBA history to record a triple-double in a playoff debut (Canisius)
- Brendan Malone, former NBA head coach (Iona)
- Michael Meeks, former Canadian Olympic basketball player (Canisius)
- Juan Mendez, professional basketball player in Europe; highest scoring Canadian in Division I men's basketball history (Niagara)
- Mike Morrison, former NBA player (Loyola)
- KC Ndefo, another key figure in Saint Peter's 2022 NCAA run
- Dan O'Sullivan, former NBA player (Fordham)
- Tim O'Toole, current ESPN analyst; former men's college basketball coach (Fairfield)
- Doug Overton, former NBA player (La Salle)
- Digger Phelps, current ESPN analyst; former men's college basketball coach (Rider)
- Darren Phillip, 2000 NCAA Top Rebounder (Fairfield)
- Rick Pych, current San Antonio Spurs executive (Fairfield)
- Jeff Ruland, former NBA player (Iona)
- Lionel Simmons, former NBA player (La Salle)
- Mike Smrek, former NBA player (Canisius)
- Jason Thompson, former Sacramento Kings lottery draft pick, former Toronto Raptors and Golden State Warriors forward (Rider)
- Edwin Ubiles former NBA player (Siena)
- Randy Woods, former NBA player (La Salle)
- A. J. Wynder, former NBA player (Fairfield)

=== Soccer ===
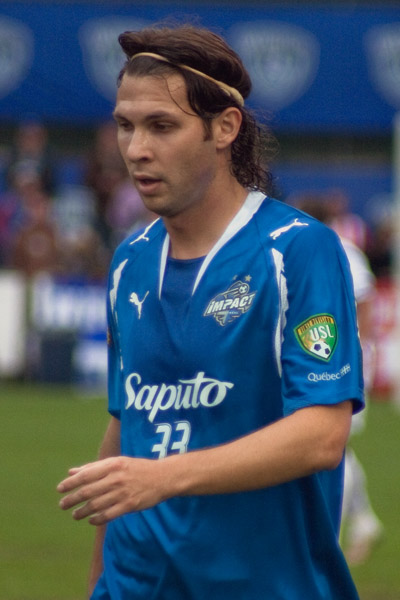
Adam Braz,
MLS Defender
Fairfield

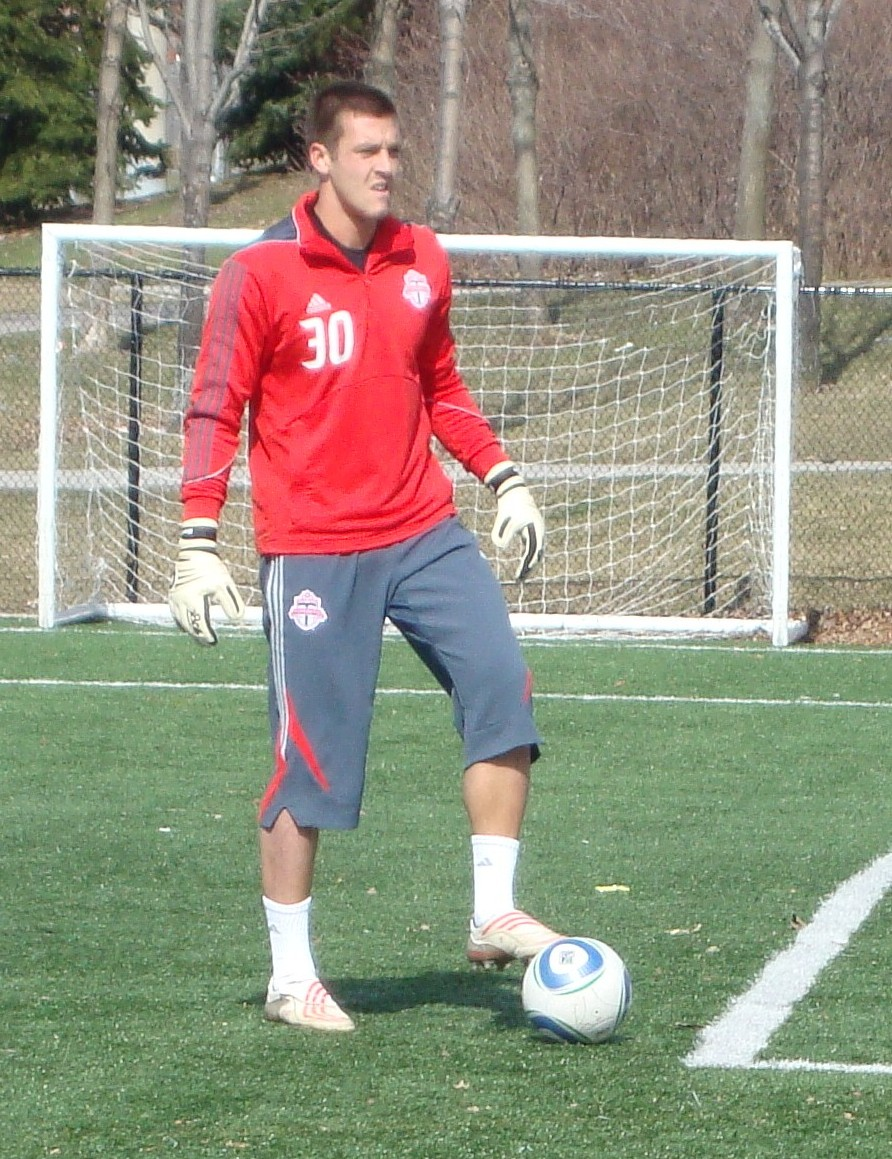
Miloš Kočić,
MLS Goalie
Loyola 2008

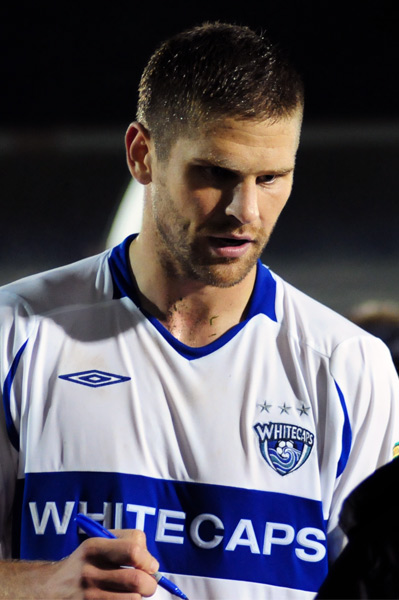
Justin Thompson,
USL-1 Defender
Fairfield

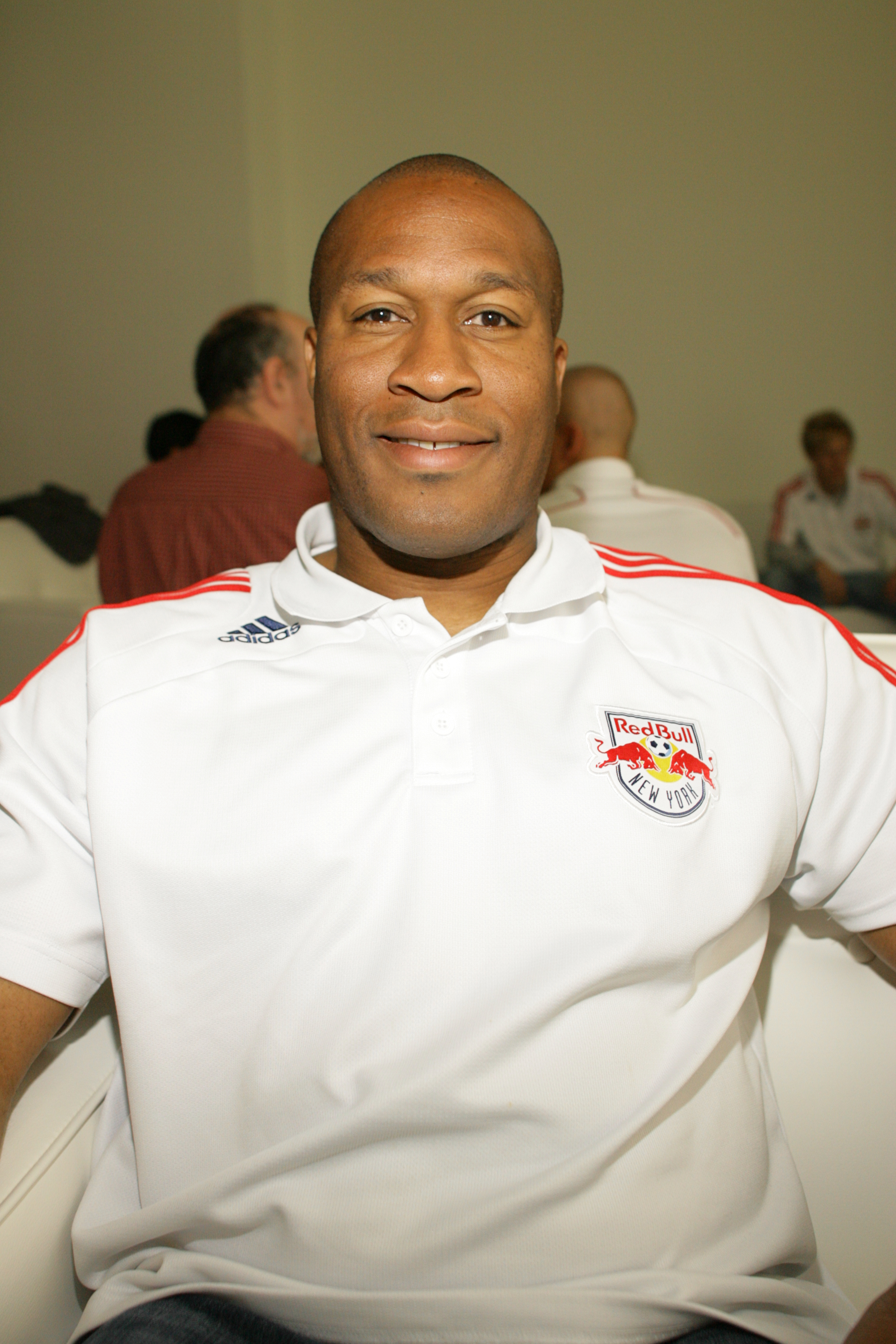
Zach Thornton,
MLS All-Star Goalie
Loyola 1998
- Jose Aguinaga, New York Red Bulls draft pick, former USL forward (Rider)
- Abby Allan, New Zealand women's national football team (Fairfield)
- Jamie Darvill, USL-2 player (Loyola)
- Anthony Di Biase, USL-2 player (Niagara)
- Bryan Harkin, USL-2 player (Fairfield)
- Christof Lindenmayer, former MLS player (Loyola)
- Mark Longwell, former U.S. National and NASL defender (Fairfield)
- Brett Maron, current player in Sweden, Goalkeeper (Fairfield)
- Jim McElderry, current Rutgers men's soccer coach and former Fordham men's soccer coach (Fairfield)
- Jim McKeown, former NASL defender (Rider)
- Tennant McVea, current USL League Two player and associate head coach for Old Dominion men's soccer, former Finnish Premier Division player (Loyola)
- Michael O'Keeffe, New Zealand men's national football team (Fairfield)
- Bobby Smith, National Soccer Hall of Fame member; former U.S. National and NASL defender (Rider)
- Matt Turner, Nottingham Forest and USMNT goalkeeper (Fairfield)
- Florian Valot, currently plays for Miami FC in USL, former player for New York Red Bulls and FC Cincinnati, midfielder/forward (Rider)
- Murphy Wiredu, former S. League player (Saint Peter's)
- Dennis Wit, former U.S. National and NASL player (Loyola)
- Jordan Scarlett, Tampa Bay Rowdies, drafted by New York Red Bulls, Defender (Iona)
- Ignacio Maganto, current player for Union Adarve in Tercera Division in Spain, drafted by Los Angeles Galaxy, Midfielder (Iona)
