= Chris Tracz =

American baseball coach and pitcher (born 1982)

Current position
- Title: Head coach
- Team: Army
- Conference: Patriot League
- Record: 122–84 (.592)

Biographical details
- Born: March 24, 1982 (age 44); North Branford, Connecticut, U.S.

Playing career
- 2001–2005: Marist
- Position: Pitcher

Coaching career (HC unless noted)
- 2006–2008: Marist (P/RC)
- 2009: Army (P)
- 2010–2022: Marist
- 2023–present: Army

Head coaching record
- Overall: 437–368–2 (.543)
- Tournaments: NCAA: 0–6

Accomplishments and honors

Championships
- MAAC Tournament (2017); 2x Patriot Tournament (2023, 2024); 3x Patriot regular season (2023, 2024, 2026)

Awards
- 2× MAAC Pitcher of the Year (2002, 2005); MAAC Coach of the Year (2022); Patriot Coach of the Year (2023)

Chris Tracz (born March 24, 1982) is an American baseball coach and former pitcher, who is the current head baseball coach of the Army Black Knights. He played college baseball for Marist from 2001 to 2005. He served as the head coach of the Marist Red Foxes (2010–2022).

== Playing career ==
Tracz was a pitcher for Marist from 2001 to 2005, helping the Red Foxes to reach three NCAA tournaments and serving as a captain for his final three seasons. In 2002 and 2003, he played collegiate summer baseball with the Falmouth Commodores of the Cape Cod Baseball League.

== Coaching career ==
Tracz began his coaching career as an assistant with the Red Foxes, serving as pitching coach and recruiting coordinator. He spent one season as an assistant with Army before returning to Marist as head coach.

In July 2011, Tracz was inducted into the North Branford High School Hall of Fame.

In June 2016, Tracz was named to the MAAC 35th anniversary team for spring sports.

In 2017, Tracz guided Marist to win their first Metro Atlantic Athletic Conference Baseball Championship since 2009. This Team received the #4 seed in the Gainesville Regional to represent the MAAC in the 2017 NCAA Division I baseball tournament.

On July 27, 2022, Tracz was named the head coach at Army.

Dave Magarity is Chris's Father-In-Law

== Head coaching record ==
This table depicts Tracz's record as a head coach.

Record table
Season	Team	Overall	Conference	Standing	Postseason
Marist Red Foxes (Metro Atlantic Athletic Conference) (2010–2022)
2010	Marist	33–22	16–8	2nd	MAAC tournament
2011	Marist	35–17	13–11	T-4th	
2012	Marist	25–25	11–12	5th	
2013	Marist	27–24-1	17–7	2nd	MAAC tournament
2014	Marist	17–32	10–14	7th	
2015	Marist	19–27-1	12–12	6th	MAAC tournament
2016	Marist	23–28	12–12	6th	MAAC tournament
2017	Marist	32–23	16–8	3rd	NCAA Regional
2018	Marist	27–23	14–10	5th	MAAC tournament
2019	Marist	27–26	15–9	T-3rd	MAAC tournament
2020	Marist	3–9	0–0		Season canceled due to COVID-19
2021	Marist	18–11	17–9	5th	MAAC tournament
2022	Marist	29–17	17–5	2nd	MAAC tournament
Marist:		315–284–2 (.526)	170–117 (.592)		
Army Black Knights (Patriot League) (2023–present)
2023	Army	38–16	21–4	1st	NCAA Regional
2024	Army	31–23	16–8	1st	NCAA Regional
2025	Army	25–25	14-11	T–2nd	Patriot League tournament
2026	Army	28–20	17–9	T–1st	Patriot League tournament
Army:		122–84 (.592)	68–32 (.680)		
Total:		437–368–2 (.543)			
National champion Postseason invitational champion Conference regular season champion Conference regular season and conference tournament champion Division regular season champion Division regular season and conference tournament champion Conference tournament champion

== See also ==
- List of current NCAA Division I baseball coaches
