= 2002 Metro Atlantic Athletic Conference baseball tournament =

- Teams: 4
- Format: Double-elimination
- Finals site: Dutchess Stadium; Wappingers Falls, NY
- Champions: Marist (3rd title)
- Winning coach: John Szefc (3rd title)
- MVP: Mike Sidoti (Marist)

2002 Metro Atlantic Athletic Conference baseball standings
	Conf.				Overall
Team	W		L	PCT	W		L	PCT
Marist ‍†‍‡‍^{y}	22	–	5	.815	41	–	14	.745
Le Moyne ‍‍‍	19	–	7	.731	30	–	18	.625
Siena ‍‍‍	17	–	9	.654	28	–	29	.491
Rider ‍‍‍	17	–	10	.630	33	–	22	.600
Manhattan ‍‍‍	16	–	11	.593	32	–	19	.627
Fairfield ‍‍‍	12	–	15	.444	20	–	30	.400
Iona ‍‍‍	10	–	16	.385	20	–	28	.417
Niagara ‍‍‍	9	–	17	.346	12	–	34	.261
Saint Peter's ‍‍‍	7	–	18	.280	12	–	30	.286
Canisius ‍‍‍	3	–	24	.111	4	–	38	.095
† – Conference champion ‡ – Tournament champion y – Invited to the NCAA tournament As of June 30, 2002; Rankings from Collegiate Baseball

The 2002 Metro Atlantic Athletic Conference baseball tournament took place from May 23 through 25, 2002. The top four regular season finishers of the league's teams met in the double-elimination tournament held at Dutchess Stadium in Wappingers Falls, New York. Marist won their third consecutive (and third overall) tournament championship and earned the conference's automatic bid to the 2002 NCAA Division I baseball tournament.

== Seeding ==
The top four teams were seeded one through four based on their conference winning percentage. They then played a double-elimination tournament.

Team	W	L	PCT	GB	Seed
Marist	22	5	.815	–	1
Le Moyne	19	7	.792	2.5	2
Siena	17	9	.654	4.5	3
Rider	17	10	.630	5	4
Manhattan	16	11	.593	6	–
Fairfield	12	15	.444	10	–
Iona	10	16	.385	11.5	–
Niagara	9	17	.346	12.5	–
Saint Peter's	7	18	.280	14	–
Canisius	3	24	.111	19	–

== Results ==
First round
1	Marist	7
4	Rider	1
2	Le Moyne	7
3	Siena	6
Lower round 1
4	Rider	4
3	Siena	3

Semi-finals
1	Marist	6^{10}
2	Le Moyne	5
Lower final
2	Le Moyne	4
4	Rider	14

Finals
1	Marist	10	—
4	Rider	5	—

== All-Tournament Team ==
The following players were named to the All-Tournament Team.

Name	School
Tim Allen	Marist
Anthony Aquilino	Le Moyne
Anthony Bocchino	Marist
Brad Cook	Marist
Mark Fisher	Rider
Ryan Flinn	Siena
Casey Long	Rider
John McGorty	Marist
Bryan Merrigan	Rider
Scott Rich	Rider

=== Most Valuable Player ===
Mike Sidoti was named Tournament Most Valuable Player. Sidoti batted .417 with 5 RBI for the Tournament, including a 2–5, 3 RBI performance in the final.
