= 2000 Metro Atlantic Athletic Conference baseball tournament =

- Teams: 4
- Format: Single-elimination
- Finals site: Dutchess Stadium; Wappingers Falls, NY
- Champions: Marist (1st title)
- Winning coach: John Szefc (1st title)
- MVP: Kevin Ool (Marist)

2000 Metro Atlantic Athletic Conference baseball standings
	Conf.				Overall
Team	W		L	PCT	W		L	PCT
Iona ‍†‍‍	22	–	4	.846	31	–	13	.705
Le Moyne ‍‍‍	18	–	7	.720	32	–	15	.681
Fairfield ‍‍‍	17	–	8	.680	26	–	20	.565
Marist ‍‍‡‍^{y}	16	–	11	.593	32	–	18	.640
Rider ‍‍‍	13	–	12	.520	22	–	29	.431
Niagara ‍‍‍	13	–	13	.500	16	–	25	.390
Siena ‍‍‍	12	–	14	.462	15	–	32	.319
Manhattan ‍‍‍	10	–	16	.385	20	–	29	.408
Saint Peter's ‍‍‍	4	–	21	.160	8	–	41	.163
Canisius ‍‍‍	4	–	23	.148	9	–	33	.214
† – Conference champion ‡ – Tournament champion y – Invited to the NCAA tournament As of June 30, 2000; Rankings from Collegiate Baseball

The 2000 Metro Atlantic Athletic Conference baseball tournament took place on May 21, 2000. The top four regular season finishers of the league's teams participated in the tournament held at Dutchess Stadium in Wappingers Falls, New York. Play began on May 18 in a double-elimination format before inclement weather forced the conference to restart the tournament in a single-elimination format held entirely on May 21. Marist won their first tournament championship and earned the conference's automatic bid to the 2000 NCAA Division I baseball tournament.

== Seeding ==
The top four teams were seeded one through four based on their conference winning percentage. They then played a single-elimination tournament.

Team	W	L	PCT	GB	Seed
Iona	22	4	.846	–	1
Le Moyne	18	7	.720	3.5	2
Fairfield	17	8	.680	4.5	3
Marist	16	11	.593	6.5	4
Rider	13	12	.520	8	–
Niagara	13	13	.500	9	–
Siena	12	14	.462	10	–
Manhattan	10	16	.385	12	–
Saint Peter's	4	21	.160	17.5	–
Canisius	4	23	.077	18.5	–

== Results ==
First round
1	Iona	0
4	Marist	2
2	Le Moyne	1
3	Fairfield	3

Finals
4	Marist	11
3	Fairfield	5

== All-Tournament Team ==
The following players were named to the All-Tournament Team.

Name	School
Anthony Ambrosini	Marist
Ryan Bittner	Fairfield
Tim Bittner	Marist
Anthony Bocchino	Marist
Ryan Brady	Marist
Brian Coughlin	Marist
Jeff Hanson	Fairfield
Tom Lopusznick	Fairfield
Manny Pizarro	Iona
Casey Saucke	Le Moyne

=== Most Valuable Player ===
Kevin Ool was named Tournament Most Outstanding Player. Ool was a freshman pitcher for Marist.
