= 2008 Metro Atlantic Athletic Conference baseball tournament =

- Teams: 4
- Format: Double-elimination
- Finals site: Mercer County Waterfront Park; Trenton, NJ
- Champions: Rider (1st title)
- Winning coach: Barry Davis (1st title)
- MVP: James Hayes (Rider)

2008 Metro Atlantic Athletic Conference baseball standings
	Conf.				Overall
Team	W		L	PCT	W		L	PCT
Canisius ‍†‍‍	19	–	5	.792	41	–	13	.759
Manhattan ‍‍‍	19	–	5	.792	31	–	20	.608
Siena ‍‍‍	15	–	8	.652	30	–	26	.536
Rider ‍‍‡‍^{y}	13	–	10	.565	29	–	28	.509
Fairfield ‍‍‍	11	–	13	.458	14	–	36	.280
Niagara ‍‍‍	10	–	14	.417	22	–	28	.440
Marist ‍‍‍	8	–	15	.348	19	–	28	.404
Saint Peter's ‍‍‍	7	–	16	.304	20	–	30	.400
Iona ‍‍‍	4	–	20	.167	4	–	44	.083
† – Conference champion ‡ – Tournament champion y – Invited to the NCAA tournament As of June 30, 2008; Rankings from Collegiate Baseball

The 2008 Metro Atlantic Athletic Conference baseball tournament took place from May 22 through 24, 2008. The top four regular season finishers of the league's teams met in the double-elimination tournament held at Mercer County Waterfront Park in Trenton, New Jersey. Rider won their first tournament championship and earned the conference's automatic bid to the 2008 NCAA Division I baseball tournament.

== Seeding ==
The top four teams were seeded one through four based on their conference winning percentage. They then played a double-elimination tournament.

Team	W	L	PCT	GB	Seed
Canisius	19	5	.792	–	1
Manhattan	19	5	.667	–	2
Siena	15	8	.652	3.5	3
Rider	13	10	.565	5.5	4
Fairfield	11	13	.458	8	–
Niagara	10	14	.417	9	–
Marist	8	15	.348	10.5	–
Saint Peter's	7	16	.304	11.5	–
Iona	4	20	.167	15	–

== Results ==
First round
1	Canisius	3
4	Rider	4
2	Manhattan	3
3	Siena	24
Lower round 1
1	Canisius	16
2	Manhattan	7

Semi-finals
4	Rider	3
3	Siena	0
Lower final
3	Siena	5
1	Canisius	2

Finals
4	Rider	8	12
3	Siena	9	5

== All-Tournament Team ==
The following players were named to the All-Tournament Team.

Pos.	Name	School
P	Jimmer Kennedy	Rider
P	Craig Chaput	Siena
IF	Alec Cabello	Canisius
IF	Mason Heyne	Rider
IF	Matt McCollum	Rider
IF	Moises Rivera	Siena
IF	Rick Seltzer	Siena
IF	Jacob Willis	Siena
OF	Adam Donato	Canisius
OF	Kevin Nieto	Manhattan
OF	Nick Messinger	Siena
DH	James Hayes	Rider

=== Most Valuable Player ===
James Hayes was named Tournament Most Outstanding Player. Hayes was a designated hitter for Rider.
