= 1996 Metro Atlantic Athletic Conference baseball tournament =

- Teams: 4
- Format: Double-elimination
- Finals site: Heritage Park; Colonie, NY
- Champions: Siena (2nd title)
- Winning coach: Tony Rossi (2nd title)

1996 Metro Atlantic Athletic Conference baseball standings
	Conf.				Overall
Team	W		L	PCT	W		L	PCT
Northern
Siena ^{x}‍‍‡‍^{y}	14	–	4	.778	28	–	20	.583
Le Moyne ‍‍‍	10	–	8	.556	17	–	19	.472
Niagara ‍‍‍	7	–	11	.389	14	–	20	.412
Canisius ‍‍‍	5	–	13	.278	13	–	22	.371
Southern
Iona ^{x}‍‍‍	11	–	7	.611	26	–	21	.553
Saint Peter's ‍‍‍	10	–	7	.588	18	–	24	.429
Fairfield ‍‍‍	10	–	8	.556	20	–	19	.513
Manhattan ‍‍‍	4	–	13	.235	9	–	30	.231
x – Division champion ‡ – Tournament champion y – Invited to the NCAA tournament As of June 30, 1996; Rankings from Collegiate Baseball

The 1996 Metro Atlantic Athletic Conference baseball tournament took place from May 10 through 12, 1996. The top two regular season finishers of the league's two divisions met in the double-elimination tournament held at Heritage Park in Colonie, New York. Siena won their second consecutive (and second overall) tournament championship and advanced to the play-in round for the right to play in the 1996 NCAA Division I baseball tournament.

== Seeding ==
The top two teams from each division were seeded based on their conference winning percentage. They then played a double-elimination tournament.

Team	W	L	PCT	GB	Seed
Northern Division
Siena	14	4	.778	—	1N
Le Moyne	10	8	.556	4	2N
Niagara	7	11	.389	7	–
Canisius	5	13	.278	9	–

Team	W	L	PCT	GB	Seed
Southern Division
Iona	11	7	.611	—	1S
Saint Peter's	10	7	.588	.5	2S
Fairfield	10	8	.556	1	–
Manhattan	4	13	.235	6.5	—

== Results ==
First round
1N	Siena	7
2S	Saint Peter's	3
1S	Iona	2
2N	Le Moyne	1
Lower round 1
2S	Saint Peter's	3
2N	Le Moyne	6

Semi-finals
1N	Siena	5
1S	Iona	4
Lower final
1S	Iona	7
2N	Le Moyne	6

Finals
1N	Siena	11	—
1S	Iona	3	—
