= 2001 Metro Atlantic Athletic Conference baseball tournament =

- Teams: 4
- Format: Double-elimination
- Finals site: Dutchess Stadium; Wappingers Falls, NY
- Champions: Marist (2nd title)
- Winning coach: John Szefc (2nd title)
- MVP: Anthony Bocchino (Marist)

2001 Metro Atlantic Athletic Conference baseball standings
	Conf.				Overall
Team	W		L	PCT	W		L	PCT
Siena ‍†‍‍	19	–	8	.704	29	–	29	.500
Rider ‍‍‍	18	–	9	.667	27	–	27	.500
Marist ‍‍‡‍^{y}	17	–	10	.630	33	–	21	.611
Le Moyne ‍‍‍	13	–	8	.619	29	–	20	.592
Niagara ‍‍‍	15	–	11	.577	25	–	20	.556
Fairfield ‍‍‍	14	–	13	.519	17	–	28	.378
Manhattan ‍‍‍	9	–	15	.375	20	–	25	.444
Canisius ‍‍‍	10	–	17	.370	14	–	28	.333
Iona ‍‍‍	8	–	15	.348	17	–	32	.347
Saint Peter's ‍‍‍	4	–	23	.148	4	–	39	.093
† – Conference champion ‡ – Tournament champion y – Invited to the NCAA tournament As of June 30, 2001; Rankings from Collegiate Baseball

The 2001 Metro Atlantic Athletic Conference baseball tournament took place from May 18 through 20, 2001. The top four regular season finishers of the league's teams met in the double-elimination tournament held at Dutchess Stadium in Wappingers Falls, New York. Marist won their second consecutive (and second overall) tournament championship and earned the conference's automatic bid to the 2001 NCAA Division I baseball tournament.

== Seeding ==
The top four teams were seeded one through four based on their conference winning percentage. They then played a double-elimination tournament.

Team	W	L	PCT	GB	Seed
Siena	19	8	.704	–	1
Rider	18	9	.667	1	2
Marist	17	10	.630	2	3
Le Moyne	13	8	.619	3	4
Niagara	15	11	.577	3.5	–
Fairfield	14	13	.519	5	–
Manhattan	9	15	.375	8.5	–
Canisius	10	17	.370	9	–
Iona	8	15	.348	9	–
Saint Peter's	4	23	.148	15	–

== Results ==
First round
1	Siena	6
4	Le Moyne	7
2	Rider	6
3	Marist	10
Lower round 1
1	Siena	6
2	Rider	7

Semi-finals
4	Le Moyne	3
3	Marist	13
Lower final
4	Le Moyne	5
2	Rider	8

Finals
3	Marist	11	—
2	Rider	3	—

== All-Tournament Team ==
The following players were named to the All-Tournament Team.

Name	School
Tim Bittner	Marist
Ryan Brady	Marist
Rich Brooks	Rider
Bill Cilento	Siena
Ben Cueto	Marist
Eddie Harper	Le Moyne
Carl Loadenthal	Rider
Casey Long	Rider
Steve O’Sullivan	Marist
Kevin Ool	Marist
Jaime Steward	Le Moyne

=== Most Valuable Player ===
Anthony Bocchino was named Tournament Most Valuable Player. Bocchino was an outfielder for Marist, who finished 3–5 in the final, with two runs and five RBI, including a grand slam in the second inning.
