= 2011 Metro Atlantic Athletic Conference baseball tournament =

- Teams: 4
- Format: Double-elimination
- Finals site: Mercer County Waterfront Park; Trenton, NJ
- Champions: Manhattan (2nd title)
- Winning coach: Kevin Leighton (2nd title)
- MVP: Mike Giordano (Manhattan)

2011 Metro Atlantic Athletic Conference baseball standings
	Conf.				Overall
Team	W		L	PCT	W		L	PCT
Manhattan ‍†‍‡‍^{y}	20	–	2	.909	34	–	19	.642
Rider ‍‍‍	16	–	7	.696	33	–	18	.647
Siena ‍‍‍	14	–	10	.583	28	–	30	.483
Canisius ‍‍‍	12	–	10	.545	26	–	32	.448
Marist ‍‍‍	13	–	11	.542	35	–	17	.673
Fairfield ‍‍‍	13	–	11	.542	22	–	25	.468
Iona ‍‍‍	7	–	17	.292	17	–	34	.333
Saint Peter's ‍‍‍	5	–	18	.217	16	–	34	.320
Niagara ‍‍‍	5	–	19	.208	8	–	40	.167
† – Conference champion ‡ – Tournament champion y – Invited to the NCAA tournament As of June 30, 2011; Rankings from Collegiate Baseball

The 2011 Metro Atlantic Athletic Conference baseball tournament took place from May 24 through 27. The top four regular season finishers of the league's teams met in the double-elimination tournament held at Mercer County Waterfront Park in Trenton, New Jersey. Manhattan won their second tournament championship and earned the conference's automatic bid to the 2011 NCAA Division I baseball tournament.

== Seeding ==
The top four teams were seeded one through four based on their conference winning percentage. They then played a double-elimination tournament.

Team	W	L	PCT	GB	Seed
Manhattan	20	2	.909	–	1
Rider	16	7	.696	4.5	2
Siena	14	10	.583	7	3
Canisius	12	10	.545	8	4
Marist	13	11	.542	8	–
Fairfield	13	11	.542	8	–
Iona	7	17	.292	14	–
Saint Peter's	5	18	.217	15.5	–
Niagara	5	19	.208	16	–

== Results ==
First round
1	Manhattan	3
4	Canisius	2
2	Rider	3
3	Siena	6
Lower round 1
4	Canisius	4
2	Rider	3

Semi-finals
1	Manhattan	8
3	Siena	7
Lower final
3	Siena	3
4	Canisius	2

Finals
1	Manhattan	5	—
3	Siena	1	—

== All-Tournament Team ==
The following players were named to the All-Tournament Team.

Pos.	Name	School
P	Garreth Cortright	Canisius
P	Neil Fryer	Siena
P	John Soldinger	Manhattan
C	Ramon Ortega	Manhattan
1B	Austin Sheffield	Manhattan
2B	Dan Paolini	Siena
2B	Jose Torralba	Canisius
SS	John Ralston	Rider
OF	Mike Fish	Siena
OF	Karl Johnston	Rider
OF	Mark Onorati	Manhattan

=== Most Valuable Player ===
Mike Giordano was named Tournament Most Valuable Player. Giordano was a pitcher for Manhattan.
