= 1997 Metro Atlantic Athletic Conference baseball tournament =

- Teams: 4
- Format: Double-elimination
- Finals site: Heritage Park; Colonie, NY
- Champions: Siena (3rd title)
- Winning coach: Tony Rossi (3rd title)
- MVP: Mike Ostrander (Siena)

1997 Metro Atlantic Athletic Conference baseball standings
	Conf.				Overall
Team	W		L	PCT	W		L	PCT
Northern
Niagara ^{x}‍‍‍	11	–	7	.611	17	–	21	.447
Siena ‍‍‡‍^{y}	10	–	8	.556	21	–	34	.382
Le Moyne ‍‍‍	10	–	8	.556	16	–	23	.410
Canisius ‍‍‍	5	–	13	.278	18	–	19	.486
Southern
Fairfield ^{x}‍‍‍	13	–	5	.722	20	–	25	.444
Iona ‍‍‍	10	–	8	.556	19	–	27	.413
Saint Peter's ‍‍‍	7	–	11	.389	10	–	27	.270
Manhattan ‍‍‍	6	–	12	.333	11	–	28	.282
x – Division champion ‡ – Tournament champion y – Invited to the NCAA tournament As of June 30, 1997; Rankings from Collegiate Baseball

The 1997 Metro Atlantic Athletic Conference baseball tournament took place from May 9 through 11, 1997. The top two regular season finishers of the league's two divisions met in the double-elimination tournament held at Heritage Park in Colonie, New York. Siena won their third consecutive (and third overall) tournament championship and advanced to the play-in round for the right to play in the 1997 NCAA Division I baseball tournament.

== Seeding ==
The top two teams from each division were seeded based on their conference winning percentage. They then played a double-elimination tournament.

Team	W	L	PCT	GB	Seed
Northern Division
Niagara	11	7	.611	–	1N
Siena	10	8	.556	1	2N
Le Moyne	10	8	.556	1	–
Canisius	5	13	.278	6	–

Team	W	L	PCT	GB	Seed
Southern Division
Fairfield	13	5	.722	—	1S
Iona	10	8	.556	3	2S
Saint Peter's	7	11	.389	6	–
Manhattan	6	12	.333	7	–

== Results ==
First round
1N	Niagara	5
2S	Iona	9
1S	Fairfield	4
2N	Siena	9
Lower round 1
1N	Niagara	5
1S	Fairfield	15

Semi-finals
2S	Iona	11
2N	Siena	2
Lower final
2N	Siena	6
1S	Fairfield	4

Finals
2S	Iona	4	8
2N	Siena	10	9

== All-Tournament Team ==
The following players were named to the All-Tournament Team.

Name	School
Kevin Brown	Siena
Steve Castrello	Iona
Kyran Connelly	Iona
Todd Donovan	Siena
Tony Fiumefreddo	Siena
Tom Lopusznick	Fairfield
Dave Marek	Siena
Adam Samuelian	Fairfield
Glenn Trevett	Niagara
Jon Wilson	Fairfield
John Penatello	Iona
Greg Toher	Iona

=== Most Valuable Player ===
Mike Ostrander was named Tournament Most Valuable Player.
