= 1995 Metro Atlantic Athletic Conference baseball tournament =

- Teams: 4
- Format: Double-elimination
- Finals site: Heritage Park; Wappingers Falls, NY
- Champions: Siena (1st title)
- Winning coach: Tony Rossi (1st title)
- MVP: P. J. Buonocore (Siena)

1995 Metro Atlantic Athletic Conference baseball standings
	Conf.				Overall
Team	W		L	PCT	W		L	PCT
Northern
Siena ^{x}‍‍‡‍^{y}	14	–	4	.778	31	–	17	.646
Le Moyne ‍‍‍	12	–	6	.667	19	–	21	.475
Canisius ‍‍‍	7	–	11	.389	21	–	20	.512
Niagara ‍‍‍	3	–	15	.167	14	–	26	.350
Southern
Fairfield ^{x}‍‍‍	13	–	5	.722	23	–	22	.511
Iona ‍‍‍	12	–	6	.667	21	–	27	.438
Saint Peter's ‍‍‍	10	–	8	.556	18	–	24	.429
Manhattan ‍‍‍	1	–	17	.056	5	–	42	.106
x – Division champion ‡ – Tournament champion y – Invited to the NCAA tournament As of June 30, 1995; Rankings from Collegiate Baseball

The 1995 Metro Atlantic Athletic Conference baseball tournament took place from May 12 through 14, 1995. The top two regular season finishers of the league's two divisions met in the double-elimination tournament held at Heritage Park in Colonie, New York. Siena won their first tournament championship and advanced to the play-in round for the right to play in the 1995 NCAA Division I baseball tournament.

== Seeding ==
The top two teams from each division were seeded based on their conference winning percentage. They then played a double-elimination tournament.

Team	W	L	PCT	GB	Seed
Northern Division
Siena	14	4	.778	—	1N
Le Moyne	12	6	.667	2	2N
Canisius	7	11	.389	7	–
Niagara	3	15	.167	11	–

Team	W	L	PCT	GB	Seed
Southern Division
Fairfield	13	5	.722	—	1S
Iona	12	6	.667	1	2S
Saint Peter's	10	8	.556	3	–
Manhattan	1	17	.056	12	–

== Results ==
First round
1N	Siena	14
2S	Iona	2
1S	Fairfield	10
2N	Le Moyne	3
Lower round 1
2S	Iona	5
2N	Le Moyne	2

Semi-finals
1N	Siena	9
1S	Fairfield	0
Lower final
1S	Fairfield	5
2S	Iona	1

Finals
1N	Siena	14	—
1S	Fairfield	2	—

== All-Tournament Team ==
The following players were named to the All-Tournament Team.

Name	School
Matt Drury	Fairfield
Tim Fleischman	Siena
Dennis Hogan	Siena
John Johnson	Fairfield
Mike Korneski	Fairfield
Isaak Lazarou	Siena
Rob McShinsky	Siena
Rob Moore	Iona
Javon Overstreet	Siena
Mike Pike	Fairfield
Paul Wilders	Siena

=== Most Valuable Player ===
P. J. Buonocore was named Tournament Most Valuable Player.
