= 1999 Metro Atlantic Athletic Conference baseball tournament =

- Teams: 4
- Format: Double-elimination
- Finals site: Dutchess Stadium; Wappingers Falls, NY
- Champions: Siena (4th title)
- Winning coach: Tony Rossi (4th title)
- MVP: Dave Pahucki (Siena)

1999 Metro Atlantic Athletic Conference baseball standings
	Conf.				Overall
Team	W		L	PCT	W		L	PCT
Northern
Siena ^{x}‍‍‡‍^{y}	21	–	5	.808	34	–	22	.607
Le Moyne ‍‍‍	17	–	9	.654	21	–	16	.568
Marist ‍‍‍	14	–	12	.538	27	–	23	.540
Niagara ‍‍‍	11	–	14	.440	13	–	22	.371
Canisius ‍‍‍	8	–	18	.308	13	–	26	.333
Southern
Iona ^{x}‍‍‍	15	–	11	.577	23	–	27	.460
Rider ‍‍‍	14	–	11	.560	26	–	30	.464
Fairfield ‍‍‍	13	–	13	.500	23	–	23	.500
Manhattan ‍‍‍	12	–	14	.462	22	–	27	.449
Saint Peter's ‍‍‍	4	–	22	.154	10	–	36	.217
x – Division champion ‡ – Tournament champion y – Invited to the NCAA tournament As of June 30, 1999; Rankings from Collegiate Baseball

The 1999 Metro Atlantic Athletic Conference baseball tournament took place from May 21 through 23, 1999. The top two regular season finishers of the league's two divisions met in the double-elimination tournament held at Dutchess Stadium in Wappingers Falls, New York. Siena won their fourth tournament championship and earned the conference's automatic bid to the 1999 NCAA Division I baseball tournament.

== Seeding ==
The top two teams from each division were seeded based on their conference winning percentage. They then played a double-elimination tournament.

Team	W	L	PCT	GB	Seed
Northern Division
Siena	21	5	.808	—	1N
Le Moyne	17	9	.654	4	2N
Marist	14	12	.538	7	–
Niagara	11	14	.440	9.5	–
Canisius	8	18	.308	13	–

Team	W	L	PCT	GB	Seed
Southern Division
Iona	15	11	.577	—	1S
Rider	14	11	.560	.5	2S
Fairfield	13	13	.500	2	–
Manhattan	12	14	.462	3	–
Saint Peter's	4	22	.154	11	–

== Results ==
First round
1N	Siena	10
2S	Rider	2
1S	Iona	1
2N	Le Moyne	2
Lower round 1
2S	Rider	3
1S	Iona	1

Semi-finals
1N	Siena	9
2N	Le Moyne	5
Lower final
2N	Le Moyne	1
2S	Rider	2

Finals
1N	Siena	16	—
2S	Rider	2	—

== All-Tournament Team ==
The following players were named to the All-Tournament Team.

Name	School
Vic Boccarossa	Le Moyne
Edwin Diaz	Le Moyne
Todd Donovan	Siena
Sean Dougherty	Siena
Ryan Finn	Siena
Trey Gethoefer	Siena
Jared Lenko	Rider
Nick Spera	Siena
Mike Volkmar	Le Moyne

=== Most Valuable Player ===
Dave Pahucki was named Tournament Most Valuable Player.
