= 2006 Metro Atlantic Athletic Conference baseball tournament =

- Teams: 4
- Format: Double-elimination
- Finals site: Dutchess Stadium; Wappingers Falls, NY
- Champions: Manhattan (1st title)
- Winning coach: Kevin Leighton (1st title)
- MVP: Eric Nieto (Manhattan)

2006 Metro Atlantic Athletic Conference baseball standings
	Conf.				Overall
Team	W		L	PCT	W		L	PCT
Le Moyne ‍†‍‍	21	–	5	.808	38	–	14	.731
Manhattan ‍‍‡‍^{y}	17	–	9	.654	34	–	23	.596
Niagara ‍‍‍	17	–	10	.630	28	–	26	.519
Rider ‍‍‍	17	–	10	.630	25	–	31	.446
Marist ‍‍‍	16	–	10	.615	24	–	28	.462
Fairfield ‍‍‍	12	–	14	.462	18	–	29	.383
Siena ‍‍‍	12	–	15	.444	23	–	31	.426
Canisius ‍‍‍	9	–	18	.333	18	–	36	.333
Iona ‍‍‍	8	–	18	.308	12	–	42	.222
Saint Peter's ‍‍‍	3	–	23	.115	10	–	41	.196
† – Conference champion ‡ – Tournament champion y – Invited to the NCAA tournament As of June 30, 2006; Rankings from Collegiate Baseball

The 2006 Metro Atlantic Athletic Conference baseball tournament took place from May 25 through 27, 2006. The top four regular season finishers of the league's teams met in the double-elimination tournament held at Dutchess Stadium in Wappingers Falls, New York. Manhattan won their first tournament championship and earned the conference's automatic bid to the 2006 NCAA Division I baseball tournament.

== Seeding ==
The top four teams were seeded one through four based on their conference winning percentage. They then played a double-elimination tournament.

Team	W	L	PCT	GB	Seed
Le Moyne	21	5	.808	–	1
Manhattan	17	9	.654	4	2
Niagara	17	10	.630	4.5	3
Rider	17	10	.630	4.5	4
Marist	16	10	.615	5	–
Fairfield	12	14	.462	9	–
Siena	12	15	.444	9.5	–
Canisius	9	18	.333	12.5	–
Iona	8	18	.308	13	–
Saint Peter's	3	23	.115	18	–

== Results ==
First round
1	Le Moyne	7
4	Niagara	2
2	Manhattan	5
3	Rider	0
Lower round 1
4	Niagara	9
3	Rider	1

Semi-finals
1	Le Moyne	2
2	Manhattan	3
Lower final
1	Le Moyne	4
4	Niagara	3

Finals
2	Manhattan	7	—
1	Le Moyne	3	—

== All-Tournament Team ==
The following players were named to the All-Tournament Team.

Pos.	Name	School
P	Bobby Blevins	Le Moyne
P	Chris Cody	Manhattan
IF	Andrew MacNevin	Niagara
IF	Steve Crawford	Le Moyne
IF	Michael Affronti	Le Moyne
IF	Dom Lombardi	Manhattan
IF	Nick Derba	Manhattan
OF	Jeff Vincent	Niagara
OF	Jamie Rose	Le Moyne
OF	Eric Nieto	Manhattan
DH	John Fitzpatrick	Manhattan

=== Most Valuable Player ===
Eric Nieto was named Tournament Most Outstanding Player. Nieto was an outfielder for Manhattan.
