= 2007 Metro Atlantic Athletic Conference baseball tournament =

- Teams: 4
- Format: Double-elimination
- Finals site: Dutchess Stadium; Wappingers Falls, NY
- Champions: Le Moyne (4th title)
- Winning coach: Steve Owens (3rd title)
- MVP: Ryan Woods (Le Moyne)

2007 Metro Atlantic Athletic Conference baseball standings
	Conf.				Overall
Team	W		L	PCT	W		L	PCT
Le Moyne ‍†‍‡‍^{y}	22	–	3	.880	34	–	19	.642
Manhattan ‍‍‍	21	–	5	.808	35	–	19	.648
Marist ‍‍‍	14	–	12	.538	24	–	32	.429
Canisius ‍‍‍	13	–	12	.520	20	–	35	.364
Saint Peter's ‍‍‍	13	–	13	.500	23	–	29	.442
Fairfield ‍‍‍	12	–	14	.462	18	–	28	.391
Rider ‍‍‍	11	–	15	.423	20	–	29	.408
Siena ‍‍‍	10	–	14	.417	12	–	33	.267
Iona ‍‍‍	8	–	18	.308	16	–	35	.314
Niagara ‍‍‍	3	–	21	.125	15	–	32	.319
† – Conference champion ‡ – Tournament champion y – Invited to the NCAA tournament As of June 30, 2007; Rankings from Collegiate Baseball

The 2007 Metro Atlantic Athletic Conference baseball tournament took place from May 24 through 26, 2007. The top four regular season finishers of the league's teams met in the double-elimination tournament held at Dutchess Stadium in Wappingers Falls, New York. Le Moyne won their fourth tournament championship and earned the conference's automatic bid to the 2007 NCAA Division I baseball tournament.

== Seeding ==
The top four teams were seeded one through four based on their conference winning percentage. They then played a double-elimination tournament.

Team	W	L	PCT	GB	Seed
Le Moyne	22	3	.880	–	1
Manhattan	21	5	.808	1.5	2
Marist	14	12	.538	8.5	3
Canisius	13	12	.520	9	4
Saint Peter's	13	13	.500	9.5	–
Fairfield	12	14	.462	10.5	–
Rider	11	15	.423	11.5	–
Siena	10	14	.417	11.5	–
Iona	8	18	.308	14.5	–
Niagara	3	21	.125	18.5	–

== Results ==
First round
1	Le Moyne	11
4	Canisius	1
2	Manhattan	6
3	Marist	2
Lower round 1
4	Canisius	1
3	Marist	5

Semi-finals
1	Le Moyne	2
2	Manhattan	1
Lower final
2	Manhattan	3
5	Marist	2

Finals
1	Le Moyne	9	—
2	Manhattan	7	—

== All-Tournament Team ==
The following players were named to the All-Tournament Team.

Pos.	Name	School
IF	Andy Parrino	Le Moyne
IF	Phil St. Amant	Le Moyne
IF	Ryan Masters	Manhattan
IF	Matt Rizzotti	Manhattan
IF	Rene Ruiz	Manhattan
Outfield	Perry Silverman	Canisius
Outfield	Mike Brown	Le Moyne
Outfield	Brian McDonough	Marist
DH	Justin Lepore	Marist
P	Bobby Blevins	Le Moyne
P	Ryan Woods	Le Moyne

=== Most Valuable Player ===
Ryan Woods was named Tournament Most Outstanding Player. Woods was a pitcher for Le Moyne.
