= 2003 Metro Atlantic Athletic Conference baseball tournament =

- Teams: 4
- Format: Double-elimination
- Finals site: Dutchess Stadium; Wappingers Falls, NY
- Champions: Le Moyne (2nd title)
- Winning coach: Steve Owens (1st title)
- MVP: Ed Harper (Le Moyne)

2003 Metro Atlantic Athletic Conference baseball standings
	Conf.				Overall
Team	W		L	PCT	W		L	PCT
Le Moyne ‍†‍‡‍^{y}	22	–	3	.880	33	–	17	.660
Marist ‍‍‍	19	–	8	.704	33	–	20	.623
Niagara ‍‍‍	16	–	10	.615	26	–	25	.510
Manhattan ‍‍‍	15	–	10	.600	26	–	26	.500
Iona ‍‍‍	15	–	11	.577	21	–	24	.467
Siena ‍‍‍	15	–	11	.577	17	–	35	.327
Rider ‍‍‍	14	–	13	.519	22	–	27	.449
Saint Peter's ‍‍‍	6	–	20	.231	7	–	33	.175
Fairfield ‍‍‍	5	–	21	.192	7	–	34	.171
Canisius ‍‍‍	3	–	23	.115	4	–	38	.095
† – Conference champion ‡ – Tournament champion y – Invited to the NCAA tournament As of June 30, 2003; Rankings from Collegiate Baseball

The 2003 Metro Atlantic Athletic Conference baseball tournament took place from May 22 through 24, 2003. The top four regular season finishers of the league's teams met in the double-elimination tournament held at Dutchess Stadium in Wappingers Falls, New York. Le Moyne won their second tournament championship and earned the conference's automatic bid to the 2003 NCAA Division I baseball tournament.

== Seeding ==
The top four teams were seeded one through four based on their conference winning percentage. They then played a double-elimination tournament.

Team	W	L	PCT	GB	Seed
Le Moyne	22	3	.880	–	1
Marist	19	8	.704	4	2
Niagara	16	10	.615	6.5	3
Manhattan	15	10	.600	7	4
Iona	15	11	.577	7.5	–
Siena	15	11	.577	7.5	–
Rider	14	13	.519	9	–
Saint Peter's	6	20	.231	16.5	–
Fairfield	5	21	.192	17.5	–
Canisius	3	23	.115	19.5	–

== Results ==
First round
1	Le Moyne	11
4	Manhattan	0
2	Marist	4
3	Niagara	3
Lower round 1
4	Manhattan	3
3	Niagara	2

Semi-finals
1	Le Moyne	4
2	Marist	3
Lower final
2	Marist	2
4	Manhattan	1

Finals
1	Le Moyne	8	—
2	Marist	4	—

== All-Tournament Team ==
The following players were named to the All-Tournament Team.

Name	School
Mike Affronti	Le Moyne
Tim Allen	Marist
Jimmy Board	Marist
Matt Griffiths	Marist
Jeff Justice	Le Moyne
Brian Mattoon	Le Moyne
John McGorty	Marist
Sam Parkins	Le Moyne
Steven Suarez	Le Moyne)
Chris Tracz	Marist

=== Most Valuable Player ===
Ed Harper was named Tournament Most Valuable Player. Harper was an outfielder for Le Moyne.
