= 1994 Metro Atlantic Athletic Conference baseball tournament =

- Teams: 4
- Format: Double-elimination
- Finals site: Heritage Park; Colonie, NY
- Champions: Saint Peter's (1st title)
- Winning coach: Bruce Sabatini (1st title)
- MVP: Victor Santos (Saint Peter's)

1994 Metro Atlantic Athletic Conference baseball standings
	Conf.				Overall
Team	W		L	PCT	W		L	PCT
Northern
Canisius ^{x}‍‍‍	17	–	1	.944	28	–	14	.667
Le Moyne ‍‍‍	9	–	9	.500	18	–	15	.545
Siena ‍‍‍	8	–	10	.444	15	–	22	.405
Niagara ‍‍‍	2	–	16	.111	9	–	29	.237
Southern
Iona ^{x}‍‍‍	13	–	5	.722	21	–	22	.488
Saint Peter's ‍‍‡‍	11	–	7	.611	18	–	22	.450
Fairfield ‍‍‍	10	–	8	.556	15	–	22	.405
Manhattan ‍‍‍	2	–	16	.111	2	–	31	.061
x – Division champion As of June 30, 1994; Rankings from Collegiate Baseball

The 1994 Metro Atlantic Athletic Conference baseball tournament took place from May 13 through 15, 1994. This was the first tournament held to determine the champion of the Metro Atlantic Athletic Conference for the 1994 NCAA Division I baseball season. The top two regular season finishers of the league's two divisions met in the double-elimination tournament held at Heritage Park in Colonie, New York. Saint Peter's won the championship and advanced to a play-in round for the right to compete in the 1994 NCAA Division I baseball tournament.

== Seeding ==
The top two teams from each division were seeded based on their conference winning percentage. They then played a double-elimination tournament.

Team	W	L	PCT	GB	Seed
Northern Division
Canisius	17	1	.944	—	1N
Le Moyne	9	9	.500	8	2N
Siena	8	10	.444	9	–
Niagara	2	16	.111	15	–

Team	W	L	PCT	GB	Seed
Southern Division
Iona	13	5	.722	—	1S
Saint Peter's	11	7	.611	2	2S
Fairfield	10	8	.556	3	–
Manhattan	2	16	.111	11	–

== Results ==
First round
1N	Canisius	6
2S	Saint Peter's	7
1S	Iona	7
2N	Le Moyne	9
Lower round 1
1N	Canisius	5
1S	Iona	16

Semi-finals
2S	Saint Peter's	7
2N	Le Moyne	1
Lower final
2N	Le Moyne	7
1S	Iona	2

Finals
2S	Saint Peter's	6	—
2N	Le Moyne	4	—

== All-Tournament Team ==
The following players were named to the All-Tournament Team.

Name	School
Kevin Allen	Le Moyne
Mike Anderson	Saint Peter's
Marty Boryczewski	Saint Peter's
Kevin Filipelli	Saint Peter's
Dave Flipkowski	Iona
John Geis	Le Moyne
Bill Moore	Saint Peter's
Chris Nocera	Saint Peter's
Brian Phillips	Le Moyne
Chris Pini	Saint Peter's
Kevin Rockwell	Le Moyne

=== Most Valuable Player ===
Victor Santos was named Tournament Most Valuable Player. Santos was a junior pitcher for Saint Peter's.
