= 2005 Metro Atlantic Athletic Conference baseball tournament =

- Teams: 4
- Format: Double-elimination
- Finals site: Dutchess Stadium; Wappingers Falls, NY
- Champions: Marist (4th title)
- Winning coach: Joe Raccuia (1st title)
- MVP: Andy Kiriakedes (Marist)

2005 Metro Atlantic Athletic Conference baseball standings
	Conf.				Overall
Team	W		L	PCT	W		L	PCT
Marist ‍†‍‡‍^{y}	22	–	5	.815	33	–	21	.611
Siena ‍‍‍	19	–	5	.792	29	–	23	.558
Manhattan ‍‍‍	15	–	8	.652	27	–	21	.563
Niagara ‍‍‍	16	–	9	.640	25	–	28	.472
Le Moyne ‍‍‍	14	–	11	.560	25	–	22	.532
Rider ‍‍‍	14	–	13	.519	21	–	29	.420
Fairfield ‍‍‍	13	–	14	.481	15	–	33	.313
Iona ‍‍‍	8	–	18	.308	11	–	38	.224
Canisius ‍‍‍	5	–	21	.192	9	–	38	.191
Saint Peter's ‍‍‍	2	–	24	.077	5	–	45	.100
† – Conference champion ‡ – Tournament champion y – Invited to the NCAA tournament As of June 30, 2005; Rankings from Collegiate Baseball

The 2005 Metro Atlantic Athletic Conference baseball tournament took place from May 25 through 27, 2005. The top four regular season finishers of the league's teams met in the double-elimination tournament held at Dutchess Stadium in Wappingers Falls, New York. Manhattan won their first tournament championship and earned the conference's automatic bid to the 2005 NCAA Division I baseball tournament.

== Seeding ==
The top four teams were seeded one through four based on their conference winning percentage. They then played a double-elimination tournament.

Team	W	L	PCT	GB	Seed
Marist	22	5	.815	–	1
Siena	19	5	.792	1.5	2
Manhattan	15	8	.652	5	3
Niagara	16	9	.640	5	4
Le Moyne	14	11	.560	7	–
Rider	14	13	.519	8	–
Fairfield	13	14	.481	9	–
Iona	8	18	.308	13.5	–
Canisius	5	21	.192	16.5	–
Saint Peter's	2	24	.077	19.5	–

== Results ==
First round
1	Marist	3
4	Niagara	2
2	Siena	5
3	Manhattan	0
Lower round 1
4	Niagara	2
3	Manhattan	0

Semi-finals
1	Marist	6
2	Siena	4
Lower final
2	Siena	0
4	Niagara	3

Finals
1	Marist	5	—
4	Niagara	4	—

== All-Tournament Team ==
The following players were named to the All-Tournament Team.

Name	School
Reed Eastley	Niagara
Kevin Grauer	Marist
Dan Griffin	Niagara
Scott King	Siena
Andrew MacNevin	Niagara
Mike Medici	Niagara
Travis Musolf	Marist
Joe Sargent	Marist
Josh Sawatzky	Niagara
Bryan Towler	Marist

=== Most Valuable Player ===
Andy Kiriakedes was named Tournament Most Outstanding Player. Kiriakedes was a shortstop for Marist who batted .500 for the tournament.
