= 1998 Metro Atlantic Athletic Conference baseball tournament =

- Teams: 4
- Format: Single-elimination
- Finals site: Dutchess Stadium; Wappingers Falls, NY
- Champions: Le Moyne (1st title)
- Winning coach: John King (1st title)
- MVP: Bill Kerry (Le Moyne)

1998 Metro Atlantic Athletic Conference baseball standings
	Conf.				Overall
Team	W		L	PCT	W		L	PCT
Northern
Le Moyne ^{x}‍‍‡‍^{y}	20	–	6	.769	26	–	15	.634
Marist ‍‍‍	18	–	8	.692	30	–	17	.638
Siena ‍‍‍	11	–	15	.423	17	–	32	.347
Niagara ‍‍‍	11	–	15	.423	17	–	23	.425
Canisius ‍‍‍	7	–	19	.269	10	–	30	.250
Southern
Rider ^{x}‍‍‍	16	–	10	.615	25	–	25	.500
Iona ‍‍‍	15	–	11	.577	22	–	26	.458
Manhattan ‍‍‍	14	–	12	.538	20	–	21	.488
Fairfield ‍‍‍	12	–	14	.462	19	–	25	.432
Saint Peter's ‍‍‍	6	–	20	.231	7	–	34	.171
x – Division champion ‡ – Tournament champion y – Invited to the NCAA tournament As of June 30, 1998; Rankings from Collegiate Baseball

The 1998 Metro Atlantic Athletic Conference baseball tournament took place from May 8 through 10, 1998. The top two regular season finishers of the league's two divisions participated in the tournament held at Dutchess Stadium in Wappingers Falls, New York. Originally scheduled as a double-elimination tournament like in previous years, inclement weather forced the conference to switch to a single-elimination format. Le Moyne won their first tournament championship and advanced to the play-in round for the right to play in the 1998 NCAA Division I baseball tournament.

== Seeding ==
The top two teams from each division were seeded based on their conference winning percentage. They then played a double-elimination tournament.

Team	W	L	PCT	GB	Seed
Northern Division
Le Moyne	20	6	.769	–	1N
Marist	18	8	.692	2	2N
Siena	11	15	.423	9	–
Niagara	11	15	.423	9	–
Canisius	7	19	.269	13	–

Team	W	L	PCT	GB	Seed
Southern Division
Rider	16	10	.615	–	1S
Iona	15	11	.577	1	2S
Manhattan	14	12	.538	2	–
Fairfield	12	14	.462	4	–
Saint Peter's	6	20	.231	10	–

== Results ==
First round
1N	Le Moyne	3
2S	Iona	1
1S	Rider	1
2N	Marist	5

Finals
1N	Le Moyne	9
2N	Marist	1

== All-Tournament Team ==
The following players were named to the All-Tournament Team.

Name	School
Wil Pickolycky	Iona
Anthony Cervini	Marist
Mark Ciccarelli	Marist
Jim McGowan	Marist
Vic Boccarossa	Le Moyne
Scott Cassidy	Le Moyne
Jack Kennedy	Le Moyne
Cam Pelton	Le Moyne
Drew Olson	Le Moyne
Derek Walsh	Le Moyne

=== Most Valuable Player ===
Bill Kerry was named Tournament Most Valuable Player.
