= Mike McRae (baseball) =

Canadian college baseball coach

Current position
- Title: Associate head coach/pitching coach
- Conference: Big Ten

Biographical details
- Born: Niagara Falls, Ontario, Canada
- Education: Colby College '91; Niagara University '93

Playing career
- 1988–1991: Colby
- Position: Pitcher

Coaching career (HC unless noted)
- 1996–1997: Niagara (asst.)
- 1998: Winthrop (asst.)
- 1999–2001: Maine (asst.)
- 2002–2004: Niagara
- 2005–2017: Canisius
- 2018–2021: VCU (asst.)
- 2022–2024: William & Mary
- 2025: Rutgers (associate HC/P)

Head coaching record
- Overall: 590–496 (.543)
- Tournaments: NCAA: 0–2

Accomplishments and honors

Awards
- 4× MAAC Coach of the Year (2003, 2008, 2010, 2014)

Mike McRae is a Canadian college baseball coach who is the associate head coach and pitching coach. He was previously the head baseball coach at the College of William & Mary from 2022 to 2024. He was formerly an assistant coach at Virginia Commonwealth University and head coach of the Canisius Golden Griffins. McRae was Canisius's head coach from the start of the 2005 season to the end of the 2017 season. Under McRae in 2013, Canisius advanced to its first NCAA tournament. Before becoming the head coach at Canisius, he was the head coach at Niagara from 2002–2004, and an assistant at several NCAA Division I programs from 1996–2001.

McRae attended Division III Colby College in Waterville, Maine. He played four seasons of baseball and one season of ice hockey for the Mules.

== Coaching career ==
=== Division I assistant ===
After starting a club baseball team at Brock University in Ontario, Canada and coaching it for the 1995 season, McRae got his first NCAA coaching job as an assistant at Niagara. He coached there from 1996–1997, and Niagara won a MAAC North Division championship in his second season. In 1998, he was an assistant at Winthrop in Rock Hill, South Carolina, before returning to the northeast to become an assistant at Maine from 1999–2001.

=== Niagara ===
On July 3, 2001, McRae was named head coach at Niagara, where he attended graduate school. In comments on his reasons for accepting the job, McRae said, "One, my aspirations to become a head coach, and there aren't that many Division I openings that come up each year. Also, it's near home and it gives me a chance to see friends and family again. And my wife is from that area as well."

McRae was the head coach at Niagara for three seasons (2002–2004). In his first season, the team finished in 8th place in the MAAC. In both his second and third, Niagara qualified for the MAAC tournament by finishing the regular season in the top four of the conference. Both teams won 16 conference games, then a program record. In 2003, McRae was named the MAAC Coach of the Year.

=== Canisius ===
Following the 2004 season, McRae became the head coach at Canisius. In the three seasons prior to McRae's hiring (2002–2004), Canisius's record was 12–119.

In his first two seasons, Canisius finished with a sub-.500 conference winning percentage and did not qualify for the postseason. In 2007, the team finished fourth in the MAAC to qualify for the program's first MAAC tournament since 1994. It went 0–2 in the tournament.

In 2008, Canisius went 41–13 and finished tied for first in the MAAC. The team finished third at the MAAC Tournament, but got the program's first postseason win, 16–7 over Manhattan in an elimination game. McRae won his second MAAC Coach of the Year Award. After finishing second in 2009, the team won the MAAC outright in 2010. The team lost in the MAAC championship game, and McRae won his third MAAC Coach of the Year Award. Canisius qualified for the 2011 and 2012 MAAC Tournaments, and it lost in the championship round again in 2012. It started the tournament with two wins, but lost two extra-inning games to Manhattan in the championship round.

In the 2013 season, McRae's team set a program record for wins by going 42–17. McRae won his 300th game as a head coach on March 16, when Canisius defeated Ohio, 16–8. The team finished tied for third in the MAAC to qualify for its seventh consecutive MAAC Tournament. As the third seed in the tournament, Canisius started off 2–0 by defeating second-seeded Marist, 2–1, and first-seeded Rider, 18–7. In the championship round, the team defeated fourth-seeded Siena, 12–11, to advance to the 2013 NCAA tournament. Canisius was seeded fourth in the Chapel Hill Regional, hosted by #1 national seed North Carolina. The team went 0–2 in the regional, losing 6–3 to North Carolina in the opening game and 14–6 to second-seeded Florida Atlantic in an elimination game.

In 2014, Canisius finished the season 40–16 and won the MAAC regular season title. In the MAAC Tournament, the team won its first two games but lost twice to Siena in the championship round.

Seven of McRae's players at Canisius have been selected in the Major League Baseball draft, most recently Garrett Cortright in 2013. Sean Jamieson, taken in the 17th round in 2011, is Canisius's highest overall pick under McRae.

=== VCU ===
McRae was named an assistant baseball coach at Virginia Commonwealth University on September 1, 2017.

=== William & Mary ===
McRae was named as the 53rd head coach in William & Mary's history by athletic director Brian Mann on the afternoon of October 27, 2021. On May 25, 2024, William and Mary announced that McRae's contract would not be renewed after 3 seasons.

=== Rutgers ===
On July 17, 2024, McRae was hired as the associate head coach and pitching coach for the Rutgers Scarlet Knights baseball team.

=== Toronto Blue Jays ===
In 2026, McRae was named bench coach of the New Hampshire Fisher Cats the Double-A affiliate of the Toronto Blue Jays.

== Personal life ==
McRae has two teenage children, Madison and Mason. He was married for 20 years to his wife, Michelle (McDonald) McRae, before her death on September 5, 2015.

== Head coaching record ==
Below is a table of McRae's records as an NCAA head baseball coach.

Record table
Season	Team	Overall	Conference	Standing	Postseason
Niagara Purple Eagles (Metro Atlantic Athletic Conference) (2002–2004)
2002	Niagara	12–34	9–17	8th	
2003	Niagara	26–25	16–10	t-3rd	MAAC Tournament
2004	Niagara	27–27	16–9	t-2nd	MAAC Tournament
Niagara:		65–86 (.430)	41–36 (.532)		
Canisius Golden Griffins (Metro Atlantic Athletic Conference) (2005–2017)
2005	Canisius	9–38	5–21	9th	
2006	Canisius	18–36	9–18	8th	
2007	Canisius	20–35	13–12	4th	MAAC Tournament
2008	Canisius	41–13	19–5	t-1st	MAAC Tournament
2009	Canisius	36–22	16–8	2nd	MAAC Tournament
2010	Canisius	39–21	19–5	1st	MAAC Tournament
2011	Canisius	26–32	12–10	t-4th	MAAC Tournament
2012	Canisius	33–27	16–8	2nd	MAAC tournament
2013	Canisius	42–17	15–9	t-3rd	NCAA Regional
2014	Canisius	40–16	22–6	1st	MAAC tournament
2015	Canisius	34–30	16–8	2nd	NCAA Regional
2016	Canisius	32–27	16–8	t-2nd	MAAC tournament
2017	Canisius	35–22	16–8	t-2nd	MAAC tournament
Canisius:		405–336 (.547)	194–126 (.606)		
William & Mary Tribe (Colonial Athletic Association) (2022–2024)
2022	William & Mary	26–23	14–10	4th	CAA tournament
2023	William & Mary	32–25	15–15	6th	CAA tournament
2024	William & Mary	32–26	13–14	T–5th	CAA tournament
William & Mary:		90–74 (.549)	42–39 (.519)		
Total:		590–496 (.543)			
National champion Postseason invitational champion Conference regular season champion Conference regular season and conference tournament champion Division regular season champion Division regular season and conference tournament champion Conference tournament champion
