= 2009 Metro Atlantic Athletic Conference baseball tournament =

- Teams: 4
- Format: Double-elimination
- Finals site: Mercer County Waterfront Park; Trenton, NJ
- Champions: Marist (5th title)
- Winning coach: Dennis Healy (1st title)
- MVP: Jacob Wiley (Marist)

2009 Metro Atlantic Athletic Conference baseball standings
	Conf.				Overall
Team	W		L	PCT	W		L	PCT
Manhattan ‍†‍‍	18	–	6	.750	35	–	18	.660
Canisius ‍‍‍	16	–	8	.667	36	–	22	.621
Marist ‍‍‡‍^{y}	15	–	9	.625	31	–	28	.525
Rider ‍‍‍	14	–	10	.583	26	–	23	.531
Niagara ‍‍‍	14	–	10	.583	20	–	35	.364
Fairfield ‍‍‍	10	–	14	.417	20	–	37	.351
Siena ‍‍‍	9	–	15	.375	15	–	35	.300
Saint Peter's ‍‍‍	7	–	17	.292	17	–	37	.315
Iona ‍‍‍	5	–	19	.208	6	–	40	.130
† – Conference champion ‡ – Tournament champion y – Invited to the NCAA tournament As of June 30, 2009; Rankings from Collegiate Baseball

The 2009 Metro Atlantic Athletic Conference baseball tournament took place from May 21 through 23, 2009. The top four regular season finishers of the league's teams met in the double-elimination tournament held at Mercer County Waterfront Park in Trenton, New Jersey. Marist won their fifth tournament championship and earned the conference's automatic bid to the 2009 NCAA Division I baseball tournament.

== Seeding ==
The top four teams were seeded one through four based on their conference winning percentage. They then played a double-elimination tournament.

Team	W	L	PCT	GB	Seed
Manhattan	18	6	.750	–	1
Canisius	16	8	.667	2	2
Marist	15	9	.625	3	3
Rider	14	10	.583	4	4
Niagara	14	10	.583	4	–
Fairfield	10	14	.417	8	–
Siena	9	15	.375	9	–
Saint Peter's	7	17	.292	11	–
Iona	5	19	.208	13	–

== Results ==
First round
1	Manhattan	2
4	Rider	1
2	Canisius	6
3	Marist	7
Lower round 1
4	Rider	8
2	Canisius	9

Semi-finals
1	Manhattan	3
3	Marist	4^{11}
Lower final
1	Manhattan	2
2	Canisius	3

Finals
3	Marist	4	13
2	Canisius	5	9

== All-Tournament Team ==
The following players were named to the All-Tournament Team.

Name	School
Brian Burton	Canisius
Richard Curylo	Marist
Shane Davis	Canisus
Mike Gazzola	Manhattan
Branson Joseph	Canisius
Kevin Mailloux	Canisius
Brian McDonough	Marist
Kyle Meyer	Marist
Bryce Nugent	Marist
Sean Olson	Rider
Chad Salem	Manhattan

=== Most Valuable Player ===
Jacob Wiley was named Tournament Most Valuable Player. Wiley was a pitcher for Marist, and recorded three saves in the Tournament.
