= Metro Conference baseball tournament =

- Conference baseball championship
- Sport: Baseball
- Conference: Metro Atlantic Athletic Conference
- Number of teams: 6
- Format: Double-elimination
- Current stadium: Heritage Financial Park
- Current location: Wappingers Falls, NY
- Played: 1994–present
- Last contest: 2025
- Current champion: Niagara
- Most championships: Marist (6)
- Official website: Baseball Championships

Host stadiums
- Clover Stadium (2022–2024); Alumni Baseball Diamond (2021); Richmond County Bank Ballpark (2018–2019); Sal Maglie Stadium (2017); Heritage Financial Park (1998–2007, 2010, 2015); FirstEnergy Park (2014); Mercer County Waterfront Park/Arm & Hammer Park (2008–2009, 2011, 2013); Joseph L. Bruno Stadium (2012); Heritage Park (1994–1997)

Host locations
- Pomona, NY (2022–2024); Fairfield, CT (2021); Staten Island, NY (2018–2019); Niagara Falls, NY (2017); Wappingers Falls, NY (1998–2007, 2010, 2015); Lakewood, NJ (2014); Trenton, NJ (2008–2009, 2011, 2013); Troy, NY (2012); Colonie, NY (1994–1997)

The Metro Conference baseball tournament (formerly called the MAAC baseball tournament) is the conference baseball championship of the NCAA Division I Metro Conference. The top six finishers in the regular season participate in the double-elimination tournament. The winner of the tournament receives an automatic berth to the NCAA Division I Baseball Championship.

== History ==
From 1982 to 1993, the Metro Atlantic Athletic Conference determined its champion by regular season records. From 1990 to 1993, the conference divided into divisions and crowned a champion of each division. In 1994, the MAAC launched a tournament to crown its conference champion, with the top two teams from each division qualifying. Beginning in 2000, the MAAC eliminated divisions, with the top four teams in the regular season qualifying for the conference tournament. In 2014, the tournament expanded from four teams to six teams.

For the first five years, the tournament winner advanced to a play-in round with a team from a different conference for the right to advance to the 48-team NCAA Tournament proper. Beginning in 1999, the tournament winner advanced directly to the expanded 64-team NCAA tournament field.

On May 27, 2026, the MAAC announced that it would adopt the new name of Metro Conference starting that July 1.

== Champions ==
=== By year ===
The following is a list of tournament champions by year.

Year	Champion	Venue	MVP
1994	Saint Peter's	Heritage Park • Colonie, NY	Victor Santos, Saint Peter's
1995	Siena	Heritage Park • Colonie, NY	P. J. Buonocore, Siena
1996	Siena	Heritage Park • Colonie, NY	
1997	Siena	Heritage Park • Colonie, NY	Mike Ostrander, Siena
1998	Le Moyne	Dutchess Stadium • Wappingers Falls, NY	Bill Kerry, Le Moyne
1999	Siena	Dutchess Stadium • Wappingers Falls, NY	Dave Pahucki, Siena
2000	Marist	Dutchess Stadium • Wappingers Falls, NY	Kevin Ool, Marist
2001	Marist	Dutchess Stadium • Wappingers Falls, NY	Anthony Bocchino, Marist
2002	Marist	Dutchess Stadium • Wappingers Falls, NY	Mike Sidoti, Marist
2003	Le Moyne	Dutchess Stadium • Wappingers Falls, NY	Ed Harper, Le Moyne
2004	Le Moyne	Dutchess Stadium • Wappingers Falls, NY	Brian Hansen, Le Moyne
2005	Marist	Dutchess Stadium • Wappingers Falls, NY	Andy Kiriakedes, Marist
2006	Manhattan	Dutchess Stadium • Wappingers Falls, NY	Eric Nieto, Manhattan
2007	Le Moyne	Dutchess Stadium • Wappingers Falls, NY	Ryan Woods, Le Moyne
2008	Rider	Mercer County Waterfront Park • Trenton, NJ	James Hayes, Rider
2009	Marist	Mercer County Waterfront Park • Trenton, NJ	Jacob Wiley, Marist
2010	Rider	Dutchess Stadium • Wappingers Falls, NY	A.J. Albee, Rider
2011	Manhattan	Mercer County Waterfront Park • Trenton, NJ	Mike Giordano, Manhattan
2012	Manhattan	Joseph L. Bruno Stadium • Troy, NY	Taylor Sewitt, Manhattan
2013	Canisius	Arm & Hammer Park • Trenton, NJ	Jesse Puscheck, Canisius
2014	Siena	FirstEnergy Park • Lakewood, NJ	Vincent Citro, Siena
2015	Canisius	Dutchess Stadium • Wappingers Falls, NY	Connor Panas, Canisius
2016	Fairfield	Dutchess Stadium • Wappingers Falls, NY	Jake Salpietro, Fairfield
2017	Marist	Sal Maglie Stadium • Niagara Falls, NY	Tony Romanelli, Marist
2018	Canisius	Richmond County Bank Ballpark • Staten Island, NY	J.P. Stevenson, Canisius
2019	Quinnipiac	Richmond County Bank Ballpark • Staten Island, NY	Brian Moskey, Quinnipiac
2020	Cancelled due to the coronavirus pandemic		
2021	Rider	Alumni Baseball Diamond • Fairfield, CT	Jordan Erbe, Rider
2022	Canisius	Clover Stadium • Pomona, NY	Matt Duffy, Canisius
2023	Rider	Clover Stadium • Pomona, NY	Scott Shaw, Rider
2024	Niagara	Clover Stadium • Pomona, NY	Matt Ward, Niagara
2025	Fairfield	Clover Stadium • Pomona, NY	Matthew Bucciero, Fairfield
2026	Rider	Heritage Financial Park • Wappingers Falls, NY	PJ Craig, Rider

- Indicates declared champion, tournament final canceled due to inclement weather.

=== By school ===
The following is a list of tournament championships listed by school.

Program	Championships	Years
Marist	6	2000, 2001, 2002, 2005, 2009, 2017
Rider	5	2008, 2010, 2021, 2023, 2026
Siena	5	1995, 1996, 1997, 1999, 2014
Canisius	4	2013, 2015, 2018, 2022
Le Moyne	4	1998, 2003, 2004, 2007
Manhattan	3	2006, 2011, 2012
Fairfield	2	2016, 2025
Saint Peter's	1	1994
Niagara	1	2024
Quinnipiac	1	2019

- Italics indicate that the program no longer fields a baseball team in the Metro Atlantic Athletic Conference.
