= 2004 Metro Atlantic Athletic Conference baseball tournament =

- Teams: 4
- Format: Double-elimination
- Finals site: Dutchess Stadium; Wappingers Falls, NY
- Champions: Le Moyne (3rd title)
- Winning coach: Steve Owens (2nd title)
- MVP: Brian Hansen (Le Moyne)

2004 Metro Atlantic Athletic Conference baseball standings
	Conf.				Overall
Team	W		L	PCT	W		L	PCT
Le Moyne ‍†‍‡‍^{y}	24	–	3	.889	36	–	21	.632
Niagara ‍‍‍	16	–	9	.640	27	–	27	.500
Manhattan ‍‍‍	16	–	9	.640	25	–	27	.481
Marist ‍‍‍	17	–	10	.630	25	–	20	.556
Rider ‍‍‍	15	–	12	.556	24	–	27	.471
Siena ‍‍‍	13	–	12	.520	27	–	26	.509
Iona ‍‍‍	11	–	14	.440	16	–	27	.372
Fairfield ‍‍‍	11	–	16	.407	16	–	27	.372
Saint Peter's ‍‍‍	4	–	23	.148	8	–	34	.190
Canisius ‍‍‍	4	–	23	.148	4	–	43	.085
† – Conference champion ‡ – Tournament champion y – Invited to the NCAA tournament As of June 30, 2004; Rankings from Collegiate Baseball

The 2004 Metro Atlantic Athletic Conference baseball tournament took place from May 27 through 29, 2004. The top four regular season finishers of the league's teams met in the double-elimination tournament held at Dutchess Stadium in Wappingers Falls, New York. Le Moyne won their third tournament championship and earned the conference's automatic bid to the 2004 NCAA Division I baseball tournament.

== Seeding ==
The top four teams were seeded one through four based on their conference winning percentage. They then played a double-elimination tournament.

Team	W	L	PCT	GB	Seed
Le Moyne	24	2	.923	–	1
Niagara	16	9	.640	7.5	2
Manhattan	16	9	.640	7.5	3
Marist	17	10	.630	7.5	4
Rider	15	12	.556	9.5	–
Siena	13	12	.520	10.5	–
Iona	11	14	.440	12.5	–
Fairfield	11	16	.407	13.5	–
Saint Peter's	4	23	.148	20.5	–
Canisius	4	23	.148	20.5	–

== Results ==
First round
1	Le Moyne	8
4	Marist	2
2	Niagara	2
3	Manhattan	7
Lower round 1
4	Marist	3
2	Niagara	7

Semi-finals
1	Le Moyne	12
3	Manhattan	5
Lower final
3	Manhattan	12
2	Niagara	7

Finals
1	Le Moyne	6	—
3	Manhattan	4	—

== All-Tournament Team ==
The following players were named to the All-Tournament Team.

Name	School
Frank Cappello	Manhattan
Matt Cucurullo	Manhattan
Andre Enriquez	Le Moyne
Josh Greco	Manhattan
Jeff Justice	Le Moyne
Mike Medici	Niagara
Travis Musolf	Marist
Josh Santerre	Manhattan
Matt Scherer	Le Moyne
Steven Suarez	Le Moyne

=== Most Valuable Player ===
Brian Hansen was named Most Valuable Player. Hansen was a catcher for Le Moyne.
