= 2026 Metro Atlantic Athletic Conference baseball tournament =

- Teams: 6
- Format: Single-elimination/Double-elimination
- Finals site: Heritage Financial Park; Wappingers Falls, New York
- Champions: Rider (5th title)
- Winning coach: Lee Lipinski (5th title)
- MVP: PJ Craig (Ryder)
- Television: ESPN+

2026 Metro Atlantic Athletic Conference baseball standings
	Conf.						Overall
Team	W		L		T	PCT	W		L		T	PCT
Rider ‍†‍‡‍^{y}	22	–	8	–	0	.733	30	–	17	–	0	.638
Niagara ‍‍‍	20	–	10	–	0	.667	26	–	19	–	1	.576
Fairfield ‍‍‍	20	–	10	–	0	.667	27	–	21	–	0	.563
Merrimack ‍‍‍	20	–	10	–	0	.667	26	–	27	–	0	.491
Canisius ‍‍‍	17	–	13	–	0	.567	21	–	24	–	0	.467
Marist ‍‍‍	17	–	13	–	0	.567	23	–	28	–	0	.451
Iona ‍‍‍	15	–	14	–	0	.517	19	–	28	–	0	.404
Quinnipiac ‍‍‍	14	–	16	–	0	.467	23	–	28	–	0	.451
Sacred Heart ‍‍‍	13	–	16	–	0	.448	17	–	32	–	0	.347
Mount St. Mary's ‍‍‍	13	–	17	–	0	.433	22	–	26	–	0	.458
Siena ‍‍‍	12	–	18	–	0	.400	20	–	30	–	0	.400
Manhattan ‍‍‍	10	–	20	–	0	.333	20	–	31	–	0	.392
Saint Peter's ‍‍‍	1	–	29	–	0	.033	5	–	47	–	0	.096
† – Conference champion ‡ – Tournament champion y – Invited to the NCAA Tournament; As of May 16, 2026; Rankings from D1Baseball

The 2026 Metro Atlantic Athletic Conference baseball tournament was held from May 20 through 23 at Heritage Financial Park in Wappingers Falls, New York. The top six teams during the regular season qualified for the conference tournament and the tournament winner received the conference's automatic bid to the 2026 NCAA Division I baseball tournament.

This was the last baseball tournament held under the MAAC name. On May 27, 2026, the conference announced that it would adopt the new name of Metro Conference starting that July 1.

== Seeding and format ==
The top eight finishers of the league's thirteen teams qualify for the conference tournament. Teams are seeded based on conference winning percentage, with the first tiebreaker being head-to-head record.

Play begins with the lowest four seeds of the tournament playing in a single-elimination round; all subsequent rounds are double-elimination. The winners of the first round advance to play the next two lowest seeds in the second round, with the top two teams receiving a further bye to the third round.

== Bracket ==
Upper round 1	Upper round 2	Upper final	Final
Game 4
Game 1	1	Rider	8
3	Fairfield	6	4	Merrimack	2	Game 7
6	Marist	3	1	Rider	5
Game 5	3	Fairfield	1
Game 2	3	Fairfield	4
4	Merrimack	7	2	Niagara	3
5	Canisius	0
1	Rider	7	6
3	Fairfield	12	1
Lower round 1	Lower round 2	Lower round 3	Lower final
Game 9
Game 8	3	Fairfield	9
Game 6	2	Niagara	6	2	Niagara	2
Game 3	6	Marist	13	6	Marist	2
6	Marist	10	4	Merrimack	8
5	Canisius	8

== Schedule ==
Game	Time*	Matchup^{#}	Score	Notes	Reference
Wednesday, May 20
1	11:00 am	No. 3 Fairfield vs No. 6 Marist	6−3		
2	3:00 pm	No. 4 Merrimack vs No. 5 Canisius	7−0		
3	7:00 pm	No. 6 Marist vs No. 5 Canisius	10–8	Canisius Eliminated	
Thursday, May 21
4	11:00 am	No. 1 Rider vs No. 4 Merrimack	8−2		
5	3:00 pm	No. 2 Niagara vs No. 3 Fairfield	3−4		
6	7:00 pm	No. 6 Marist vs. No. 4 Merrimack	13−8	Merrimack Eliminated	
Friday, May 22
7	11:00 am	No. 1 Rider vs. No. 3 Fairfield	5−1		
8	3:00 pm	No. 2 Niagara vs. No. 6 Marist	−	Elimination Game	
9	7:00 pm	No. 3 Fairfield vs. Winner Game 8	−	Elimination Game	
Saturday, May 23
10	12:00 pm	No. 3 Fairfield vs No. 1 Rider	12-7		
11	4:00 pm	Winner Game 7 vs. Winner Game 9 (if necessary)	−	Elimination Game (if necessary)	
