= 2010 Metro Atlantic Athletic Conference baseball tournament =

- Teams: 4
- Format: Double-elimination
- Finals site: Dutchess Stadium; Wappingers Falls, NY
- Champions: Rider (2nd title)
- Winning coach: Barry Davis (2nd title)
- MVP: A.J. Albee (Manhattan)

2010 Metro Atlantic Athletic Conference baseball standings
| | Conf. | | | | Overall |
| Team | W | | L | PCT | W | | L | PCT |
|---|---|---|---|---|---|---|---|---|
| Canisius ‍†‍‍ | 19 | – | 5 | .792 | 39 | – | 21 | .650 |
| Marist ‍‍‍ | 16 | – | 8 | .667 | 33 | – | 22 | .600 |
| Rider ‍‍‡‍^{y} | 15 | – | 9 | .625 | 36 | – | 23 | .610 |
| Manhattan ‍‍‍ | 15 | – | 9 | .625 | 31 | – | 20 | .608 |
| Siena ‍‍‍ | 13 | – | 11 | .542 | 27 | – | 27 | .500 |
| Niagara ‍‍‍ | 13 | – | 11 | .542 | 17 | – | 36 | .321 |
| Fairfield ‍‍‍ | 8 | – | 16 | .333 | 18 | – | 32 | .360 |
| Saint Peter's ‍‍‍ | 6 | – | 18 | .250 | 18 | – | 34 | .346 |
| Iona ‍‍‍ | 3 | – | 21 | .125 | 9 | – | 40 | .184 |
† – Conference champion ‡ – Tournament champion y – Invited to the NCAA tournament As of June 30, 2010; Rankings from Collegiate Baseball

The 2010 Metro Atlantic Athletic Conference baseball tournament took place from May 26 through 28. The top four regular season finishers of the league's teams met in the double-elimination tournament held at Dutchess Stadium in Wappingers Falls, New York. Rider won their second tournament championship and earned the conference's automatic bid to the 2010 NCAA Division I baseball tournament.

== Seeding ==
The top four teams were seeded one through four based on their conference winning percentage. They then played a double-elimination tournament.

| Team | W | L | PCT | GB | Seed |
|---|---|---|---|---|---|
| Canisius | 19 | 5 | .792 | – | 1 |
| Marist | 16 | 8 | .667 | 3 | 2 |
| Rider | 15 | 9 | .625 | 4 | 3 |
| Manhattan | 15 | 9 | .625 | 4 | 4 |
| Siena | 13 | 11 | .542 | 6 | – |
| Niagara | 13 | 11 | .542 | 6 | – |
| Fairfield | 8 | 16 | .333 | 11 | – |
| Saint Peter's | 6 | 18 | .250 | 13 | – |
| Iona | 3 | 21 | .125 | 16 | – |

== Results ==
First round
1 | Canisius | 7
4 | Manhattan | 5
2 | Marist | 7
3 | Rider | 10
Lower round 1
4 | Manhattan | 6
2 | Marist | 5

Semi-finals
1 | Canisius | 5
3 | Rider | 10
Lower final
1 | Canisius | 6
4 | Manhattan | 5

Finals
3 | Rider | 4 | —
1 | Canisius | 2 | —

== All-Tournament Team ==
The following players were named to the All-Tournament Team.

| Pos. | Name | School |
|---|---|---|
| P | Patrick Devlin | Rider |
| P/OF | Shayne Willson | Canisius |
| 1B | Brian Burton | Canisius |
| 1B | Mason Heyne | Rider |
| SS | Sean Jamieson | Canisius |
| DH | Ryan Gauck | Marist |
| OF | Kevin Nieto | Manhattan |
| OF | Mark Onorati | Manhattan |
| OF | Brandon Cotten | Rider |
| OF | Nick Wojnowski | Rider |

=== Most Valuable Player ===
A.J. Albee was named Tournament Most Valuable Player. Albee was a second baseman for Rider.
