= 2025 Metro Atlantic Athletic Conference baseball tournament =

- Teams: 8
- Format: Single-elimination/Double-elimination
- Finals site: Clover Stadium; Pomona, New York
- Champions: Fairfield (2nd title)
- Winning coach: Bill Currier (2nd title)
- MVP: Matthew Bucciero (Fairfield)
- Television: ESPN+

2025 Metro Atlantic Athletic Conference baseball standings
	Conf.						Overall
Team	W		L		T	PCT	W		L		T	PCT
Rider ‍†‍‍	22	–	6	–	0	.786	34	–	18	–	0	.654
Fairfield ‍‍‡‍^{y}	21	–	8	–	0	.724	39	–	19	–	0	.672
Sacred Heart ‍‍‍	17	–	13	–	0	.567	28	–	26	–	0	.519
Siena ‍‍‍	17	–	13	–	0	.567	22	–	32	–	0	.407
Quinnipiac ‍‍‍	17	–	13	–	0	.567	29	–	26	–	1	.527
Mount St. Mary's ‍‍‍	15	–	13	–	0	.536	23	–	28	–	0	.451
Marist ‍‍‍	14	–	14	–	0	.500	26	–	28	–	0	.481
Niagara ‍‍‍	14	–	16	–	0	.467	19	–	27	–	0	.413
Manhattan ‍‍‍	12	–	15	–	0	.444	20	–	28	–	0	.417
Iona ‍‍‍	13	–	17	–	0	.433	19	–	33	–	0	.365
Merrimack ‍‍‍	11	–	19	–	0	.367	16	–	34	–	1	.324
Canisius ‍‍‍	10	–	19	–	0	.345	14	–	31	–	0	.311
Saint Peter's ‍‍‍	5	–	24	–	0	.172	11	–	37	–	0	.229
† – Conference champion ‡ – Tournament champion y – Invited to the NCAA Tournament; As of May 31, 2025; Rankings from D1Baseball

The 2025 Metro Atlantic Athletic Conference baseball tournament was held from May 20 through 24 at Clover Stadium in Pomona, New York. Due to the conference's adding of Merrimack and Sacred Heart, the tournament expanded to eight teams from the six-team field featured in the previous 10 tournaments. Fairfield won the tournament and received the conference's automatic bid to the 2025 NCAA Division I baseball tournament.

== Seeding and format ==
The top eight finishers of the league's thirteen teams qualify for the conference tournament. Teams are seeded based on conference winning percentage, with the first tiebreaker being head-to-head record.

Play begins with the lowest four seeds of the tournament playing in a single-elimination round; all subsequent rounds are double-elimination. The winners of the first round advance to play the next two lowest seeds in the second round, with the top two teams receiving a further bye to the third round.

=== Bracket ===
Play-in round
Game 1
5	Quinnipiac	10
8	Niagara	5
Game 2
6	Mount St. Mary's	3
7	Marist	12
Lower second round
7	Marist	12
4	Siena	2

Second round
Game 3
4	Siena	6
5	Quinnipiac	7
Game 4
3	Sacred Heart	14 (7)
7	Marist	3
Lower third round
3	Sacred Heart	7
7	Marist	9

Third round
1	Rider	8
5	Quinnipiac	5
2	Fairfield	13 (7)
3	Sacred Heart	3
Lower semifinal
5	Quinnipiac	11
7	Marist	4

Semifinals
Game 9
1	Rider	1
2	Fairfield	11 (8)
Lower final
1	Rider	7
5	Quinnipiac	3

Final
2	Fairfield	7 (10)	-
1	Rider	6	-

== Schedule ==
Game	Time*	Matchup^{#}	Score	Notes	Reference
Tuesday, May 20
1	11:00 am	No. 8 Niagara vs No. 5 Quinnipiac	5−10	Niagara Eliminated	
2	3:00 pm	No. 7 Marist vs No. 6 Mount St. Mary's	12−3	Mount St. Mary's Eliminated	
Wednesday, May 21
3	10:00 am	No. 7 Marist vs No. 3 Sacred Heart	3−14 ^{(7)}		
4	2:00 pm	No. 5 Quinnipiac vs No. 4 Siena	7−6		
5	6:00 pm	No. 7 Marist vs No. 4 Siena	12−2	Siena Eliminated	
Friday, May 23
6	11:00 am	No. 3 Sacred Heart vs No. 2 Fairfield	3−13 ^{(7)}		
7	3:00 pm	No. 5 Quinnipiac vs No. 1 Rider	5−8		
8	7:00 pm	No. 7 Marist vs No. 3 Sacred Heart	9−7	Sacred Heart Eliminated	
Saturday, May 24
9	11:00 am	No. 2 Fairfield vs No. 1 Rider	11−1		
10	3:00 pm	No. 7 Marist vs No. 5 Quinnipiac	4−11	Marist Eliminated	
11	7:00 pm	No. 1 Rider vs No. 5 Quinnipiac	7−3	Quinnipiac Eliminated	
Sunday, May 25
12	12:00 pm	No. 1 Rider vs No. 2 Fairfield	6−7 ^{(10)}	Rider Eliminated	

== All–Tournament Team ==
Player	Team
Tyler Hartley	Marist
Lewis Rodriguez	Marist
Alex Irizarry	Quinnipiac
Christian Smith
Erich Hartmann	Rider
Charley Magoulick	Rider
Nick Shuhet	Rider
Bowen Baker	Fairfield
Dean Ferrara	Fairfield
JP Kuczik	Fairfield
Luke Nomura	Fairfield
**Matthew Bucciero**	Fairfield

MVP in bold
