= 2014 Metro Atlantic Athletic Conference baseball tournament =

- Teams: 6
- Format: Double-elimination
- Finals site: FirstEnergy Park; Lakewood, NJ
- Champions: Siena (5th title)
- Winning coach: Tony Rossi (5th title)
- MVP: Vincent Citro (Siena)

2014 Metro Atlantic Athletic Conference baseball standings
	Conf.				Overall
Team	W		L	PCT	W		L	PCT
Canisius ‍†‍‍	20	–	4	.833	40	–	16	.714
Siena ‍‍‡‍^{y}	17	–	7	.708	27	–	33	.450
Fairfield ‍‍‍	15	–	8	.652	32	–	24	.571
Monmouth ‍‍‍	12	–	10	.545	24	–	25	.490
Quinnipiac ‍‍‍	12	–	10	.545	18	–	31	.367
Manhattan ‍‍‍	11	–	13	.458	17	–	33	.340
Marist ‍‍‍	10	–	14	.417	17	–	32	.347
Iona ‍‍‍	9	–	15	.375	13	–	31	.295
Niagara ‍‍‍	8	–	14	.364	20	–	31	.392
Rider ‍‍‍	7	–	15	.318	16	–	33	.327
Saint Peter's ‍‍‍	6	–	17	.261	11	–	41	.212
† – Conference champion ‡ – Tournament champion y – Invited to the NCAA tournament Rankings from Collegiate Baseball

The 2014 Metro Atlantic Athletic Conference baseball tournament was held from May 21 through 25. The top six regular season finishers of the league's eleven teams met in the double-elimination tournament held at FirstEnergy Park in Lakewood, New Jersey. Siena won the tournament for the fifth time, earning the conference's automatic bid to the 2014 NCAA Division I baseball tournament.

== Seeding ==
The top six teams were seeded one through four based on their conference winning percentage. They then played a double-elimination tournament.

Team	W	L	Pct	GB	Seed
Canisius	20	4	.833	–	1
Siena	17	7	.708	3	2
Fairfield	15	8	.652	4.5	3
Quinnipiac	12	10	.545	7	4
Monmouth	12	10	.545	7	5
Manhattan	11	13	.458	9	6
Marist	10	14	.417	10	–
Iona	9	15	.375	11	–
Niagara	8	14	.364	11	–
Rider	7	15	.318	12	–
Saint Peter's	6	17	.261	13.5	–

== Results ==
Upper round 1	Upper round 2	Upper final	Final
1	Canisius	10
3	Fairfield	3	4	Quinnipiac	1
6	Manhattan	2	1	Canisius	6
3	Fairfield	2
2	Siena	3
4	Quinnipiac	4	3	Fairfield	5^{12}
5	Monmouth	0
1	Canisius	5	1
2	Siena	6	5
Lower round 1	Lower round 2	Lower round 3	Lower final
3	Fairfield	3
5	Monmouth	5	2	Siena	4
4	Quinnipiac	2	2	Siena	6
6	Manhattan	7	5	Monmouth	5
5	Monmouth	8^{15}

== Line Scores ==
=== Wednesday, May 21st ===
Game 1 12:00pm #3 Fairfield vs. #6 Manhattan

Team	1	2	3	4	5	6	7	8	9	R	H	E
#6 Manhattan	0	0	0	0	0	0	2	0	0	2	5	0
#3 Fairfield	0	0	2	0	0	0	0	1	x	3	7	2

Game 2 3:30pm #4 Quinnipiac vs. #5 Monmouth

Team	1	2	3	4	5	6	7	8	9	R	H	E
#5 Monmouth	0	0	0	0	0	0	0	0	0	0	8	1
#4 Quinnipiac	0	0	4	0	0	0	0	0	x	4	11	0

Game 3 7:00pm #1 Canisius vs. #4 Quinnipiac

Team	1	2	3	4	5	6	7	8	9	R	H	E
#4 Quinnipiac	1	0	0	0	0	0	0	0	0	1	7	3
#1 Canisius	2	1	0	3	3	0	1	0	x	10	13	0

=== Thursday, May 22nd ===
Game 4 12:00pm #2 Siena vs. #3 Fairfield

Team	1	2	3	4	5	6	7	8	9	10	11	12	R	H	E
#3 Fairfield	0	0	0	1	0	0	1	0	0	0	0	3	5	10	1
#2 Siena	0	0	0	0	2	0	0	0	0	0	0	1	3	15	2

Game 6 was postponed due to weather, Game 5 was suspended in the 9th inning and completed on Friday.

=== Friday, May 23rd ===
Game 5 10:30am #5 Monmouth vs. #6 Manhattan (Completion of game suspended in 9th inning)

Team	1	2	3	4	5	6	7	8	9	10	11	12	13	14	15	R	H	E
#6 Manhattan	0	0	0	1	0	0	0	0	5	0	0	1	0	0	0	7	14	2
#5 Monmouth	0	0	0	0	1	4	1	0	0	0	0	1	0	0	1	8	19	0

Manhattan was eliminated

Game 6 1:00pm #4 Quinnipiac vs. #5 Monmouth

Team	1	2	3	4	5	6	7	8	9	R	H	E
#5 Monmouth	3	0	2	0	0	0	0	0	0	5	10	3
#4 Quinnipiac	1	0	0	0	1	0	0	0	0	2	5	3

Quinnipiac was eliminated

Game 7 5:00pm #1 Canisius vs. #3 Fairfield

Team	1	2	3	4	5	6	7	8	9	R	H	E
#3 Fairfield	0	0	0	1	0	1	0	0	0	2	9	1
#1 Canisius	1	1	1	1	0	0	0	2	x	6	10	1

Game 8 was postponed due to weather and rescheduled to Saturday

=== Saturday, May 24th ===
Team	1	2	3	4	5	6	7	8	9	R	H	E
#5 Monmouth	0	0	3	0	0	2	0	0	0	5	9	2
#2 Siena	1	0	1	0	0	1	2	0	1	6	13	1

Monmouth was eliminated

Game 9 3:30pm #2 Siena vs. #3 Fairfield

Team	1	2	3	4	5	6	7	8	9	R	H	E
#3 Fairfield		0	0	0	2	0	1	0	0	3	10	0
#2 Siena	1	2	0	0	0	0	1	0	x	4	10	0

Fairfield was eliminated

=== Sunday, May 25th ===
Game 10 12:00pm #1 Canisius vs. #2 Siena

Team	1	2	3	4	5	6	7	8	9	R	H	E
#2 Siena	0	0	0	0	1	0	0	5	0	6	9	1
#1 Canisius	0	0	0	0	0	1	3	0	1	5	11	1

Game 11 3:40pm #1 Canisius vs. #2 Siena

Team	1	2	3	4	5	6	7	8	9	R	H	E
#1 Canisius	0	0	0	0	0	1	0	0	0	1	9	2
#2 Siena	1	0	2	0	0	1	0	1	x	5	11	0

Canisius was eliminated

== All-Tournament Team ==
The following players were named to the All-Tournament Team. Siena infielder Vincent Citro, one of four Saints selected, was named the Most Outstanding Player.

Player	Team
Vincent Citro	Siena
Andres Ortiz	Siena
Neil Fryer	Siena
John Rooney	Siena
Devon Stewart	Canisius
Anthony Massicci	Canisius
Jimmy Luppens	Canisius
Kyle Perry	Monmouth
Steve Wilgus	Monmouth
Thomas Jankins	Quinnipiac
Brendan Slattery	Manhattan
Ryan Plourde	Fairfield
