= 2015 Metro Atlantic Athletic Conference baseball tournament =

- Teams: 6
- Format: Double-elimination
- Finals site: Dutchess Stadium; Wappingers Falls, NY
- Champions: Canisius (2nd title)
- Winning coach: Mike McRae (2nd title)
- MVP: Connor Panas (Canisius)

2015 Metro Atlantic Athletic Conference baseball standings
	Conf.						Overall
Team	W		L		T	PCT	W		L		T	PCT
Rider ‍†‍‍	15	–	6	–	0	.714	28	–	22	–	0	.560
Canisius ‍‍‡‍^{y}	16	–	8	–	0	.667	34	–	30	–	0	.531
Quinnipiac ‍‍‍	15	–	9	–	0	.625	29	–	27	–	0	.518
Siena ‍‍‍	13	–	8	–	0	.619	23	–	28	–	0	.451
Monmouth ‍‍‍	14	–	10	–	0	.583	22	–	24	–	0	.478
Marist ‍‍‍	12	–	12	–	0	.500	19	–	27	–	1	.415
Iona ‍‍‍	11	–	13	–	0	.458	20	–	33	–	0	.377
Fairfield ‍‍‍	9	–	15	–	0	.375	17	–	32	–	0	.347
Manhattan ‍‍‍	9	–	15	–	0	.375	18	–	34	–	0	.346
Niagara ‍‍‍	8	–	16	–	0	.333	13	–	32	–	2	.298
Saint Peter's ‍‍‍	7	–	17	–	0	.292	10	–	38	–	1	.214
‡ – Tournament champion y – Invited to the NCAA tournament As of June 30, 2015; Rankings from Collegiate Baseball

The 2015 Metro Atlantic Athletic Conference baseball tournament was held from May 20 through 24. The top six regular season finishers of the league's eleven teams met in the double-elimination tournament held at Dutchess Stadium in Wappingers Falls, New York. Second-seeded Canisius won their second tournament championship to earn the conference's automatic bid to the 2015 NCAA Division I baseball tournament.

== Seeding ==
The top six teams were seeded one through six based on their conference winning percentage. They then played a double-elimination tournament.

Team	W	L	Pct	GB	Seed
Rider	15	6	.714	—	1
Canisius	16	8	.667	1	2
Quinnipiac	15	9	.625	1.5	3
Siena	13	8	.619	2	4
Monmouth	14	10	.583	2.5	5
Marist	12	12	.500	4.5	6
Iona	11	13	.458	5.5	—
Fairfield	9	15	.375	7.5	—
Manhattan	9	15	.375	7.5	—
Niagara	8	16	.333	8.5	—
Saint Peter's	7	17	.292	9.5	—

== Results ==
Upper round 1	Upper round 2	Upper final	Final
1	Rider	4
3	Quinnipiac	7	4	Siena	5
6	Marist	3	4	Siena	6*
3	Quinnipiac	5
2	Canisius	1
4	Siena	12	3	Quinnipiac	6
5	Monmouth	0
4	Siena	5	2
2	Canisius	10	11
Lower round 1	Lower round 2	Lower round 3	Lower final
3	Quinnipiac	2
1	Rider	7	2	Canisius	12
2	Canisius	5	2	Canisius	8
6	Marist	10	6	Marist	0
5	Monmouth	3

== All-Tournament Team ==
The following players were named to the All-Tournament Team.

Name	School
Connor Panas	Canisius
Mike Krische	Canisius
Jack Massa	Canisius
J.P. Stevenson	Canisius
Rich Vrana	Marist
Dan Shea	Monmouth
Vincent Guglietti	Quinnipiac
Thomas Jankins	Quinnipiac
Nick Richter	Rider
Joe Drpich	Siena
Matt Quintana	Siena
Dan Swain	Siena

=== Most Valuable Player ===
Connor Panas was named Tournament Most Valuable Player. Panas had 13 hits in 26 at bats, with 10 runs scored and 12 driven in for the Tournament.
