= Barry Davis (baseball) =

American baseball coach

Dr. Barry Davis
Current position
- Title: Acting Head Coach
- Team: Rider
- Conference: MAAC

Biographical details
- Education: Bridgewater College '87

Playing career
- 1984–1987: Bridgewater
- Position: SS

Coaching career (HC unless noted)
- 1988: George Mason (asst.)
- 1989: Frostburg State (asst.)
- 1990–2000: Gloucester CC
- 2001–2004: Georgia Southwestern
- 2005–2024: Rider

Head coaching record
- Overall: 483–520–1 (.482) (NCAA) 434–109–5 (.797) (NJCAA) 137–87–1 (.611) (NAIA)
- Tournaments: NCAA: 1–8

Accomplishments and honors

Championships
- 2x MAAC: 2013, 2015; 4x MAAC Tournament: 2008, 2010, 2021, 2023; Georgia-Alabama-Carolina Conference: 2002; 4x NJCAA D3 National 1992–1993, 1999–2000; 8x NJCAA D3 Region XIX: 1992–1996, 1998–2000

Awards
- 3x MAAC Coach of the Year (2006, 2013, 2015); NJCBA D1 Coach of the Year (2010); Georgia Dugout Club NAIA Coach of the Year (2002); 4x NJCAA D3 Coach of the Year (1992–1993, 1999–2000); Gloucester County College Sports Hall of Fame 2010, Gloucester County Sports Hall of Fame 2010, Bridgewater College Athletic Hall of Fame 2014, and the NJCAA Baseball Coaches Hall of Fame 2016.

Barry Davis is an American baseball coach, who is best known for his 20+ year stint as the head baseball coach of the Rider Broncs. He initially held that position from the start of the 2005 season until the end of the 2024 season. In 2026, he was named Rider's acting head coach after his successor, Lee Lipinski took a leave of absence. Under Davis, Rider reached four NCAA tournaments, in 2008, 2010 and 2021 and 2023. He was named MAAC Coach of the Year three times: 2006, 2013, and 2015

Prior to Rider, Davis was the head coach at NJCAA school Gloucester County College (1990–2000) and then-NAIA school Georgia Southwestern State University (2001–2004). At Gloucester, Davis won four NJCAA Division III national championships.

Davis has been inducted in five Hall of Fames. He was inducted into the Gloucester County College Sports Hall of Fame in 2010. and the Gloucester County Sports Hall of Fame in 2012. Davis was also inducted into the Bridgewater College Athletic Hall of Fame in 2014 and the NJCAA (National Junior College Athletic Association) Baseball Coaches Hall of Fame in 2016. In 2024, Davis was inducted into the Albemarle High School Hall of Fame.

Davis holds a bachelor's degree from Bridgewater College (Virginia) in health and physical education, a master's degree in education from Frostburg State University (Maryland) and a doctoral degree in sports leadership from Concordia University at Chicago.

== Head coaching record ==
Below is a table of Davis's yearly records as a collegiate baseball head coach.

Record table
Season	Team	Overall	Conference	Standing	Postseason
Gloucester CC (NJCAA) (1990–2000)
Gloucester CC (NJCAA):		434–109–5	National Junior College World Series Champions (1992–93,99–2000)		
Georgia Southwestern (Georgia-Alabama-Carolina Conference) (2001–2004)
2001	Georgia Southwestern	29–25	17–9	4th	GAC Conference Tournament
2002	Georgia Southwestern	49–13	19–5	1st	NAIA Regional
2003	Georgia Southwestern	35–18	15–10	4th	GAC Conference Tournament
2004	Georgia Southwestern	24–31-1	5–16		GAC Conference Tournament
Georgia Southwestern (NAIA):		137–87-1	56–40		
Rider (MAAC) (2005–2024)
2005	Rider	21–29	14–13	6th	
2006	Rider	25–31	17–10	T-3rd	MAAC Tournament
2007	Rider	20–29	11–15	7th	
2008	Rider	29–28	13–10	4th	NCAA Regional
2009	Rider	26–23	14–10	T-4th	MAAC Tournament
2010	Rider	36–23	15–9	T-3rd	NCAA Regional
2011	Rider	33–18	16–7	2nd	MAAC Tournament
2012	Rider	22–34	13–11	4th	MAAC tournament
2013	Rider	35–22	18–6	1st	MAAC tournament
2014	Rider	16–33	7–15	10th	
2015	Rider	28–22	15–6	1st	MAAC tournament
2016	Rider	18–33	10–14	8th	
2017	Rider	24–28–1	12–12	6th	MAAC tournament
2018	Rider	12–35	7–16	10th	
2019	Rider	17–36	8–16	T-9th	
2020	Rider	6–8	0–0		Season canceled due to COVID-19
2021	Rider	23–18	18–16	3rd	NCAA Regional
2022	Rider	28–26	12–10	T-4th	MAAC tournament
2023	Rider	36–21	14–7	2nd	NCAA Regional
2024	Rider	28–23	18–6	3rd	MAAC tournament
Rider:		483–520–1 (.482)	252–209 (.547)		
Total:		1,054–716–7 (.595)			
National champion Postseason invitational champion Conference regular season champion Conference regular season and conference tournament champion Division regular season champion Division regular season and conference tournament champion Conference tournament champion

== See also ==
- Rider Broncs
