= 2016 Metro Atlantic Athletic Conference baseball tournament =

- Teams: 6
- Format: Double-elimination
- Finals site: Dutchess Stadium; Wappingers Falls, NY
- Champions: Fairfield (1st title)
- Winning coach: Bill Currier (1st title)
- MVP: Jake Salpietro (Fairfield)

2016 Metro Atlantic Athletic Conference baseball standings
	Conf.						Overall
Team	W		L		T	PCT	W		L		T	PCT
Fairfield ‍†‍‡‍^{y}	17	–	7	–	0	.708	32	–	26	–	0	.552
Monmouth ‍‍‍	16	–	8	–	0	.667	30	–	27	–	0	.526
Siena ‍‍‍	16	–	8	–	0	.667	25	–	32	–	0	.439
Canisius ‍‍‍	16	–	8	–	0	.667	32	–	27	–	0	.542
Manhattan ‍‍‍	13	–	11	–	0	.542	24	–	31	–	0	.436
Marist ‍‍‍	13	–	11	–	0	.542	24	–	27	–	0	.471
Niagara ‍‍‍	11	–	13	–	0	.458	16	–	37	–	1	.306
Quinnipiac ‍‍‍	10	–	14	–	0	.417	21	–	31	–	0	.404
Rider ‍‍‍	10	–	14	–	0	.417	18	–	33	–	0	.353
Iona ‍‍‍	5	–	19	–	0	.208	11	–	39	–	0	.220
Saint Peter's ‍‍‍	5	–	19	–	0	.208	10	–	42	–	0	.192
† – Conference champion ‡ – Tournament champion y – Invited to the NCAA tournament As of June 11, 2016; Rankings from Collegiate Baseball

The 2016 Metro Atlantic Athletic Conference baseball tournament was held from May 25 through 29. The top six regular season finishers of the league's eleven teams met in the double-elimination tournament, which was held at Dutchess Stadium in Wappingers Falls, New York. As tournament champion, Fairfield earned the conference's automatic bid to the 2016 NCAA Division I baseball tournament.

== Seeding ==
The top six teams were seeded one through six based on their conference winning percentage. They then played a double-elimination tournament.

Team	W	L	Pct	GB	Seed
Fairfield	17	7	.708	—	1
Siena	16	8	.667	1	2
Monmouth	16	8	.667	1	3
Canisius	16	8	.667	1	4
Marist	13	11	.542	4	5
Manhattan	13	11	.542	4	6
Niagara	11	13	.458	6	—
Quinnipiac	10	14	.417	7	—
Rider	10	14	.417	7	—
Iona	5	19	.208	12	—
Saint Peter's	5	19	.208	12	—

== Results ==
Upper round 1	Upper round 2	Upper final	Final
1	Fairfield	5
3	Monmouth	8	6	Manhattan	2
6	Manhattan	12	1	Fairfield	8
4	Canisius	5
2	Siena	4
4	Canisius	15	4	Canisius	8
5	Marist	8
1	Fairfield	18	—
2	Siena	2	—
Lower round 1	Lower round 2	Lower round 3	Lower final
4	Canisius	0
6	Manhattan	4	2	Siena	5
3	Monmouth	1	2	Siena	15
3	Monmouth	9	6	Manhattan	8
5	Marist	6

== All-Tournament Team ==
The following players were named to the All-Tournament Team.

Name	School
Jake Salpietro	Fairfield
Drew Arciuolo	Fairfield
Michael Conti	Fairfield
Jack Gethings	Fairfield
Kevin Radziewicz	Fairfield
Chris Amorosi	Siena
Bryan Goossens	Siena
Phil Madonna	Siena
Jake Lumley	Canisius
Anthony Massicci	Canisius
Joe Jacques	Manhattan
Fabian Pena	Manhattan

=== Most Valuable Player ===
Jake Salpietro was named Tournament Most Valuable Player.
