= 2022 Metro Atlantic Athletic Conference baseball tournament =

- Teams: 6
- Format: Double-elimination
- Finals site: Clover Stadium; Pomona, New York
- Champions: Canisius (4th title)

2022 Metro Atlantic Athletic Conference baseball standings
	Conf.				Overall
Team	W		L	PCT	W		L	PCT
Fairfield ‍†‍‍	18	–	5	.783	31	–	20	.608
Marist ‍‍‍	17	–	5	.773	29	–	17	.630
Canisius ‍‍‡‍^{y}	15	–	9	.625	29	–	23	.558
Monmouth ‍‍‍	12	–	10	.545	24	–	27	.471
Rider ‍‍‍	12	–	10	.545	28	–	26	.519
Niagara ‍‍‍	13	–	11	.542	22	–	32	.407
Manhattan ‍‍‍	12	–	12	.500	24	–	26	.480
Quinnipiac ‍‍‍	8	–	15	.348	15	–	33	.313
Siena ‍‍‍	8	–	15	.348	11	–	37	.229
Saint Peter's ‍‍‍	6	–	17	.261	9	–	41	.180
Iona ‍‍‍	6	–	18	.250	6	–	41	.128
† – Conference champion ‡ – Tournament champion y – Invited to the NCAA tournament Rankings from D1Baseball

The 2022 Metro Atlantic Athletic Conference baseball tournament was held from May 25 through 28. The top six regular season finishers of the league's eleven teams met in the double-elimination tournament held at Clover Stadium in Pomona, New York. The tournament champion, Canisius, earned the conference's automatic bid to the 2022 NCAA Division I baseball tournament.

== Seeding ==
The top six teams will be seeded one through four based on their conference winning percentage. They then play a double-elimination tournament.

== Results ==
Upper round 1	Upper round 2	Upper final	Final
1	Fairfield	3
3	Canisius	11	5	Rider	4
6	Niagara	0	5	Rider	9
3	Canisius	11
2	Marist	1
4	Monmouth	1	3	Canisius	12
5	Rider	5
3	Canisius	9	–
5	Rider	5	–
Lower round 1	Lower round 2	Lower round 3	Lower final
5	Rider	11
1	Fairfield	14	6	Niagara	8
2	Marist	4	6	Niagara	19
4	Monmouth	5	6	Niagara	7
6	Niagara	9

== Schedule ==
Game	Time*	Matchup^{#}	Score	Television
Wednesday, May 25
1	11:00am	No. 6 Niagara vs No. 3 Canisius	0-11	ESPN+
2	3:00pm	No. 4 Monmouth vs No. 5 Rider	1-5	ESPN+
3	7:00pm	No. 4 Monmouth vs No. 6 Niagara Elimination Game	5-9	ESPN+
Thursday, May 26
4	11:00am	No. 1 Fairfield vs No. 5 Rider	3-4	ESPN+
5	3:00pm	No. 2 Marist vs No. 3 Canisius	1-12	ESPN+
6	7:00pm	No. 6 Niagara vs No. 2 Marist Elimination Game	7-4	ESPN+
Friday, May 27
7	11:00am	No. 5 Rider vs No. 3 Canisius	9-11	ESPN+
8	3:00pm	No. 6 Niagara vs No. 1 Fairfield Elimination Game	19-14	ESPN+
9	7:00pm	No. 6 Niagara vs No. 5 Rider Elimination Game	8-11	ESPN+
Championship – Saturday, May 28
10	12:00pm	No. 3 Canisius vs No. 5 Rider	9-5	ESPN+
*Game times in EDT. # – Rankings denote tournament seed.
