= 2013 Metro Atlantic Athletic Conference baseball tournament =

- Teams: 4
- Format: Double-elimination
- Finals site: Arm & Hammer Park; Trenton, NJ
- Champions: Canisius (1st title)
- Winning coach: Mike McRae (1st title)
- MVP: Jesse Puscheck (Canisius)

2013 Metro Atlantic Athletic Conference baseball standings
| | Conf. | | | | | | Overall |
| Team | W | | L | | T | PCT | W | | L | | T | PCT |
|---|---|---|---|---|---|---|---|---|---|---|---|---|
| Rider ‍†‍‍ | 18 | – | 6 | – | 0 | .750 | 35 | – | 22 | – | 0 | .614 |
| Marist ‍‍‍ | 17 | – | 7 | – | 0 | .708 | 27 | – | 24 | – | 1 | .529 |
| Canisius ‍‍‡‍^{y} | 15 | – | 9 | – | 0 | .625 | 41 | – | 15 | – | 0 | .732 |
| Siena ‍‍‍ | 15 | – | 9 | – | 0 | .625 | 27 | – | 29 | – | 0 | .482 |
| Fairfield ‍‍‍ | 11 | – | 13 | – | 0 | .458 | 20 | – | 29 | – | 0 | .408 |
| Manhattan ‍‍‍ | 9 | – | 12 | – | 0 | .429 | 22 | – | 27 | – | 0 | .449 |
| Saint Peter's ‍‍‍ | 9 | – | 15 | – | 0 | .375 | 17 | – | 34 | – | 0 | .333 |
| Niagara ‍‍‍ | 9 | – | 15 | – | 0 | .375 | 16 | – | 37 | – | 0 | .302 |
| Iona ‍‍‍ | 3 | – | 21 | – | 0 | .125 | 8 | – | 43 | – | 0 | .157 |
‡ – Tournament champion y – Invited to the NCAA tournament As of May 25, 2013; Rankings from Collegiate Baseball

The 2013 Metro Atlantic Athletic Conference baseball tournament was held from May 23 through 26. The top four regular season finishers of the league's teams met in the double-elimination tournament held at Arm & Hammer Park in Trenton, New Jersey. Canisius, the tournament champion, earned the conference's automatic bid to the 2013 NCAA Division I baseball tournament.

== Seeding ==
The top four teams were seeded one through four based on their conference winning percentage. They then played a double-elimination tournament. Canisius claimed the third seed over Siena by tiebreaker.

| Team | W | L | Pct. | GB | Seed |
|---|---|---|---|---|---|
| Rider | 18 | 6 | .750 | – | 1 |
| Marist | 17 | 7 | .708 | 1 | 2 |
| Canisius | 15 | 9 | .625 | 3 | 3 |
| Siena | 15 | 9 | .625 | 3 | 4 |
| Fairfield | 11 | 13 | .458 | 7 | – |
| Manhattan | 9 | 12 | .529 | 7.5 | – |
| Saint Peter's | 9 | 15 | .375 | 9 | – |
| Niagara | 9 | 15 | .375 | 9 | – |
| Iona | 3 | 21 | .125 | 15 | – |

== Results ==
First round
1 | Rider | 7
4 | Siena | 1
2 | Marist | 1
3 | Canisius | 2
Lower round 1
4 | Siena | 12
2 | Marist | 5

Semi-finals
1 | Rider | 7
3 | Canisius | 18
Lower final
1 | Rider | 8
4 | Siena | 11

Finals
3 | Canisius | 12 | -
4 | Siena | 11 | -

== All-Tournament Team ==
The following players were named to the All-Tournament Team.

| Name | School |
|---|---|
| Mike Orefice | Marist |
| Chris Thorsen | Marist |
| Tyler Smith | Rider |
| Adam Wayman | Rider |
| Mike Allen | Siena |
| Andres Ortiz | Siena |
| Larry Balkwill | Siena |
| Brooklyn Foster | Canisius |
| Ronnie Bernick | Canisius |
| Garrett Cortright | Canisius |

=== Most Valuable Player ===
Jesse Puscheck was named Tournament Most Valuable Player. Puscheck was a designated hitter for Canisius.
