= Kevin Leighton =

American baseball coach and player (born 1979)

Current position
- Title: Head coach
- Team: Fordham
- Conference: Atlantic 10
- Record: 355–416–1 (.460)

Biographical details
- Born: August 28, 1979 (age 47); Brewster, New York, U.S.

Playing career
- 1998–2001: Seton Hall

Coaching career (HC unless noted)
- 2002–2005: Manhattan (Asst.)
- 2006–2011: Manhattan
- 2012–present: Fordham

Head coaching record
- Overall: 555–535–2 (.509)
- Tournaments: A10: 7–10; NCAA: 2–4

Accomplishments and honors

Championships
- 3 MAAC regular season (2006, 2011, 2012); 2 MAAC Tournament (2009, 2011); Atlantic 10 Tournament (2019)

Awards
- 2 MAAC Coach of the Year (2009, 2011)

Kevin Leighton (born August 28, 1979) is an American baseball coach and former player, who is the current head baseball coach of the Fordham Rams. He played college baseball for the Seton Hall Pirates from 1998 to 2001. He served as the head coach of the Manhattan (2002–2005).

== Playing career ==
After a successful high school career in Brewster, New York, Leighton was drafted in the 1997 MLB draft by the Philadelphia Phillies. He instead chose to attend college, and played four seasons with Seton Hall, helping the Pirates to the 2001 Big East Conference baseball tournament title, and a pair of NCAA Division I Baseball Championship appearances. Leighton earned his degree from Seton Hall in 2001, and would later add a master's degree from Manhattan College.

== Coaching career ==
After graduating, Leighton accepted an assistant coach position at Manhattan, serving under then-head coach Steve Trimper. With Trimper's departure for Maine, Leighton was elevated to head coach, after just four years as an assistant. He led the Jaspers to a pair of Metro Atlantic Athletic Conference baseball tournament titles and NCAA Division I Baseball Championship appearances. In his first season, the Jaspers won the MAAC Tournament and advanced to regional final the NCAA tournament, resulting in Leighton being named the American Baseball Coaches Association Northeast Region Coach of the Year in 2006. Manhattan would repeat the performance in 2011, but fell in both NCAA tournament games. In his time at Manhattan, Leighton coached 51 All-Conference players and produced eleven professional players. On July 18, 2012, Leighton was named head coach at Fordham.

== Head coaching record ==
This table shows Leighton's record as a head coach at the Division I level.

Record table
Season	Team	Overall	Conference	Standing	Postseason
Manhattan (Metro Atlantic Athletic Conference) (2006–2011)
2006	Manhattan	34–23	17–9	2nd	NCAA Regional
2007	Manhattan	35–19	21–5	2nd	MAAC Tournament
2008	Manhattan	31–20–1	19–5	1st	MAAC Tournament
2009	Manhattan	35–18	18–6	1st	MAAC Tournament
2010	Manhattan	31–20	15–9	4th	MAAC Tournament
2011	Manhattan	34–19	20–2	1st	NCAA Regional
Manhattan:		200–119–1			
Fordham (Atlantic 10 Conference) (2012–present)
2012	Fordham	22–34	12–12	8th (13)	
2013	Fordham	22–33	8–16	12th (15)	
2014	Fordham	24–30	13–14	7th (12)	Atlantic 10 tournament
2015	Fordham	22–32	13–11	7th (13)	Atlantic 10 tournament
2016	Fordham	29–29	14–10	5th	Atlantic 10 tournament
2017	Fordham	27–24	11–12	9th	
2018	Fordham	35–19–1	16–8	2nd	Atlantic 10 tournament
2019	Fordham	38–22	15–9	4th	NCAA Regional
2020	Fordham	8–6	0–0		Season canceled due to COVID-19
2021	Fordham	24–19	11–9	4th (Small)	
2022	Fordham	16–36	9–15	10th	
2023	Fordham	19–36	7–17	10th	
2024	Fordham	19–33	10–14	T-9th	
2025	Fordham	25–33	15–15	6th	Atlantic 10 Tournament
2026	Fordham	25–30	15–15	8th	
Fordham:		355–416–1 (.460)	169–177 (.488)		
Total:		555–535–2 (.509)			
National champion Postseason invitational champion Conference regular season champion Conference regular season and conference tournament champion Division regular season champion Division regular season and conference tournament champion Conference tournament champion
