= 2018 Metro Atlantic Athletic Conference baseball tournament =

- Teams: 6
- Format: Double-elimination
- Finals site: Richmond County Bank Ballpark; Staten Island
- Champions: Canisius (3rd title)
- Television: ESPN+

2018 Metro Atlantic Athletic Conference baseball standings
	Conf.				Overall
Team	W		L	PCT	W		L	PCT
Monmouth ‍‍‍	16	–	7	.696	28	–	23	.549
Quinnipiac ‍‍‍	16	–	8	.667	25	–	28	.472
Canisius ‍‍‍	16	–	8	.667	31	–	20	.608
Siena ‍‍‍	14	–	10	.583	19	–	33	.365
Marist ‍‍‍	14	–	10	.583	26	–	21	.553
Niagara ‍‍‍	13	–	11	.542	24	–	25	.490
Manhattan ‍‍‍	13	–	11	.542	25	–	28	.472
Iona ‍‍‍	10	–	13	.435	16	–	31	.340
Fairfield ‍‍‍	9	–	14	.391	22	–	29	.431
Rider ‍‍‍	7	–	16	.304	12	–	35	.255
Saint Peter's ‍‍‍	2	–	22	.083	2	–	42	.045
‡ – Tournament champion As of May 16, 2018; Rankings from Collegiate Baseball

The 2018 Metro Atlantic Athletic Conference baseball tournament was held from May 23 through 26. The top six regular season finishers of the league's eleven teams met in the double-elimination tournament, which was at Richmond County Bank Ballpark in Staten Island, New York. As tournament champion, Canisius earned the conference's automatic bid to the 2018 NCAA Division I baseball tournament.

== Seeding ==
The top six teams were seeded one through six based on their conference winning percentage. They then played a double-elimination tournament.

== Results ==
Upper round 1	Upper round 2	Upper final	Final
1	Monmouth	5
3	Canisius	5	4	Siena	4
6	Niagara	4	1	Monmouth	4
3	Canisius	7
2	Quinnipiac	3
4	Siena	6	3	Canisius	11
5	Marist	3
3	Canisius	11	–
1	Monmouth	0	–
Lower round 1	Lower round 2	Lower round 3	Lower final
1	Monmouth	11
2	Quinnipiac	7 ^{10}	2	Quinnipiac	8
4	Siena	9	4	Siena	6
6	Niagara	3	5	Marist	5
5	Marist	6
