= John Szefc =

American college baseball coach

Current position
- Title: Head coach
- Team: Virginia Tech
- Conference: ACC
- Record: 253–200

Biographical details
- Born: c. 1967 (age 58–59); Goshen, New York, U.S.
- Education: Drexel University (1989)

Playing career
- 1986–1987: Connecticut
- 1988–1989: Drexel

Coaching career (HC unless noted)
- 1990–1994: Drexel (assistant)
- 1995: Sacred Heart (assistant)
- 1996–2002: Marist
- 2003–2008: Louisiana–Lafayette (assistant)
- 2009–2010: Kansas (assistant)
- 2011–2012: Kansas State (assistant)
- 2013–2017: Maryland
- 2018–present: Virginia Tech

Head coaching record
- Overall: 641–455–3

Accomplishments and honors

Championships
- 2x MAAC Conference Tournament (2000, 2001); NEC Regular season and Conference Tournament (1997); MAAC Regular season and Conference Tournament (2002); ACC Regular season (2022)

Awards
- NEC Coach of the Year (1997); ACC Coach of the Year (2022)

John Szefc (born c. 1967) is an American college baseball coach, currently serving as the head coach of the Virginia Tech baseball team. He has held that position since leaving the University of Maryland in June, 2017, where he had coached since the 2013 season.

== Playing career ==
Szefc played for two seasons for Connecticut before transferring to Drexel. He was an all-conference selection in 1989, his senior year. He graduated from Drexel in 1989.

== Coaching career ==
After completing his degree at Drexel, Szefc became an assistant coach at his alma mater. He remained for five seasons before moving to Sacred Heart for one season. In August 1995, he was hired as head coach at Marist. He remained at Marist for seven seasons. In just his second season, the Red Foxes earned their first Northeast Conference championship, and Szefc was named NEC Coach of the Year. In addition to 1997, Marist appeared in the 2000, 2001, and 2002 NCAA tournaments. The Red Foxes were 41–14 in 2002, Szefc's final year with the team, and defeated Southwest Missouri State in the NCAA tournament. Five players from that team would be selected in the Major League Baseball draft.

Szefc became an assistant coach at Louisiana–Lafayette, where he served as hitting coach and top assistant. The Ragin' Cajuns offense in his six seasons improved dramatically, with a 60-point jump in batting average over his first three seasons. The 2005 team set a school record for hits, and ranks second in school history in runs and runs batted in. Szefc also served as recruiting coordinator for ULL, and the team won a pair of Sun Belt Conference championships and appeared in the 2005 and 2007 NCAA tournaments.

Following his time in Louisiana, Szefc moved to Kansas, where he also served as recruiting coordinator and hitting coach in the highly competitive Big 12 Conference. The Jayhawks appeared in the Big 12 Conference baseball tournament both years Szefc served in Lawrence, and advanced to the Regional Final in 2009. He then moved to Kansas State for the 2011 season, holding the same roles with the Wildcats while also adding the associate head coach title. Szefc's hitters again improved over previous seasons, ranking highly in KSU record books for offensive production.

Szefc was named head coach at Maryland on July 18, 2012. He faced budget constraints in College Park due to financial issues in the Maryland athletic department, but moved from the Atlantic Coast Conference to the Big Ten Conference.

On June 9, 2017, Virginia Tech Athletic Director Whit Babcock named Szefc the Hokies new head coach.

== Head coaching record ==
Record table
| Season | Team | Overall | Conference | Standing | Postseason |
|---|---|---|---|---|---|
Marist Red Foxes (Northeast Conference) (1996–1997)
| 1996 | Marist | 16–24 | 8–13 | 7th | |
| 1997 | Marist | 32–19 | 14–7 | T–1st | NCAA Regional |
Marist Red Foxes (Metro Atlantic Athletic Conference) (1998–2002)
| 1998 | Marist | 30–17 | 18–8 | 2nd (North) | |
| 1999 | Marist | 27–23 | 14–12 | 3rd (North) | |
| 2000 | Marist | 30–17–2 | 16–11 | 4th | NCAA Regional |
| 2001 | Marist | 33–21–1 | 17–10 | 3rd | NCAA Regional |
| 2002 | Marist | 41–14 | 22–5 | 1st | NCAA Regional |
| Marist: | | 209–135–3 | 109–66 | | |
Maryland Terrapins (Atlantic Coast Conference) (2013–2014)
| 2013 | Maryland | 30–25 | 11–19 | 4th (Atlantic) | |
| 2014 | Maryland | 40–23 | 15–14 | 2nd (Atlantic) | NCAA Super Regional |
Maryland Terrapins (Big Ten Conference) (2015–2017)
| 2015 | Maryland | 42–24 | 14–10 | T–3rd | NCAA Super Regional |
| 2016 | Maryland | 30–27 | 13–11 | T–6th | |
| 2017 | Maryland | 37–21 | 15–9 | 5th | NCAA Regional |
| Maryland: | | 179–120 | 68–63 | | |
Virginia Tech (Atlantic Coast Conference) (2018–present)
| 2018 | Virginia Tech | 21–33 | 8–22 | 7th (Coastal) | |
| 2019 | Virginia Tech | 26–27 | 9–21 | 6th (Coastal) | |
| 2020 | Virginia Tech | 11–5 | 1–2 | (Coastal) | Season canceled due to COVID-19 |
| 2021 | Virginia Tech | 27–25 | 16–20 | 7th (Coastal) | |
| 2022 | Virginia Tech | 45–14 | 19–9 | 1st (Coastal) | NCAA Super Regional |
| 2023 | Virginia Tech | 30–23 | 12–17 | 5th (Coastal) | |
| 2024 | Virginia Tech | 32–22 | 14–16 | 5th (Coastal) | |
| 2025 | Virginia Tech | 31–25 | 12–18 | 12th | ACC Tournament |
| 2026 | Virginia Tech | 30–26 | 15–15 | 7th | NCAA Regional |
| Virginia Tech: | | 253–200 | 106–140 | | |
| Total: | | 641–455–3 | | | |
National champion Postseason invitational champion Conference regular season champion Conference regular season and conference tournament champion Division regular season champion Division regular season and conference tournament champion Conference tournament champion

== See also ==
- List of current NCAA Division I baseball coaches
