= Tony Rossi (baseball) =

Biographical details
- Born: December 11, 1943 (age 82)
- Education: The College at Brockport (1965)

Playing career
- 1963–1965: Brockport
- Position: Infield

Coaching career (HC unless noted)
- 1970–2023: Siena

Head coaching record
- Overall: 936–1,190–8 (.440)
- Tournaments: NCAA: 1–4 (.200)

Accomplishments and honors

Championships
- 5× MAAC Championship (1995, 1996 ,1997, 1999, 2014)

Awards
- 6× MAAC Coach of the Year (1991, 1995, 1996, 1999, 2001, 2005); 3× SUNY All Star (1963, 1964, 1965); Siena Sports Hall of Fame (1985); Albany Twilight League Hall of Fame (1985)

Tony Rossi (born December 11, 1943) is an American former college baseball coach and player, resigning 18 games into his 54th season as head coach of the Siena Saints baseball program on March 20, 2023. Rossi is the longest tenured coach with the same institution in NCAA Division I baseball, and only Augie Garrido has been a head coach for more years than Rossi.

Rossi played at Brockport State, now SUNY Brockport for three seasons, turning down professional offers from the Los Angeles Dodgers and Cincinnati Reds in order to complete his degree. After ending his playing days, he briefly coached lacrosse at Siena before becoming head baseball coach of the then-NCAA Division II Saints. Under Rossi, the Saints transitioned to NCAA Division I, claimed five Metro Atlantic Athletic Conference championships, made two NCAA tournaments, and placed three players in the Major Leagues, most notably John Lannan. Rossi has earned six MAAC Coach of the Year awards.

Rossi grew up in Schenectady and taught middle school math for more than 30 years in addition to his coaching job.

== Head coaching record ==
This table shows Rossi's record as a head coach.

Record table
Season	Team	Overall	Conference	Standing	Postseason
Siena (Division II independent) (1970–1976)
1970	Siena	7–10			
1971	Siena	7–12			
1972	Siena	7–8			
1973	Siena	2–16			
1974	Siena	12–7			
1975	Siena	12–8			
1976	Siena	13–9–1			
Siena:		60–62–1 (.488)			
Siena (D-I Independent) (1977–present)
1977	Siena	12–11	0–0		
1978	Siena	15–17	0–0		
1979	Siena	15–14	0–0		
1980	Siena	16–12	0–0		
Siena:		58–54 (.518)	0–0 (.000)		
Siena (ECAC North) (1981–1984)
1981	Siena	17–18			
1982	Siena	12–17			
1983	Siena	15–10–1			
1984	Siena	13–17			
Siena:		57–62–1 (.475)			
Siena (North Atlantic Conference) (1985–1989)
1985	Siena	22–13–1			
1986	Siena	21–11			
1987	Siena	13–16			
1988	Siena	16–17			
1989	Siena	19–14			
Siena:		91–71–1 (.558)			
Siena (Metro Atlantic Athletic Conference) (1990–2023)
1990	Siena	6–24–1	5–6	3rd (North)	
1991	Siena	12–25	11–6	2nd (North)	
1992	Siena	8–25	5–13	4th (North)	
1993	Siena	11–24	7–11	T-2nd (North)	
1994	Siena	15–22	8–10	3rd (North)	
1995	Siena	31–17	14–4	1st	
1996	Siena	28–20	14–4	1st	
1997	Siena	21–34	10–8	T-2nd (North)	MAAC Tournament
1998	Siena	17–32	11–15	T-3rd (North)	
1999	Siena	34–22	21–5	1st	NCAA Regional
2000	Siena	15–32	12–14	7th	
2001	Siena	29–29	19–8	1st	
2002	Siena	28–29	17–9	3rd	MAAC Tournament
2003	Siena	17–35–1	15–11	T-5th	
2004	Siena	27–26	13–12	6th	
2005	Siena	29–23	19–5	2nd	MAAC Tournament
2006	Siena	23–31–1	12–15	7th	
2007	Siena	12–33	10–13	8th	
2008	Siena	30–26	15–8	3rd	MAAC Tournament
2009	Siena	15–35	8–15	7th	
2010	Siena	27–27	13–11	T-5th	
2011	Siena	28–30	14–10	3rd	MAAC Tournament
2012	Siena	18–37	8–16	8th	
2013	Siena	27–30	15–9	4th	MAAC tournament (Note: The top four finishers of the MAAC's nine teams qualified for the tournament in 2013.)
2014	Siena	27–33	17–7	2nd	NCAA Regional
2015	Siena	23–28	13–8	4th	MAAC Tournament
2016	Siena	25–32	16–8	T-2nd	MAAC Tournament
2017	Siena	20–28–2	11–13	T-8th	MAAC Tournament
2018	Siena	21–35	14–10	4th	MAAC tournament
2019	Siena	18–33	12–12	7th	
2020	Siena	0–17	0–0		Season canceled due to COVID-19
2021	Siena	15–24	14–22	7th	MAAC tournament
2022	Siena	11–37	8–15	T-8th	
2023	Siena	2–16	0–0		
Siena:		936–1,190–8 (.440)	401–333 (.546)		
Total:		936–1,190–8 (.440)			
National champion Postseason invitational champion Conference regular season champion Conference regular season and conference tournament champion Division regular season champion Division regular season and conference tournament champion Conference tournament champion
