= Heritage Park (Colonie, New York) =

Abandoned sport stadium in Colonie, New York

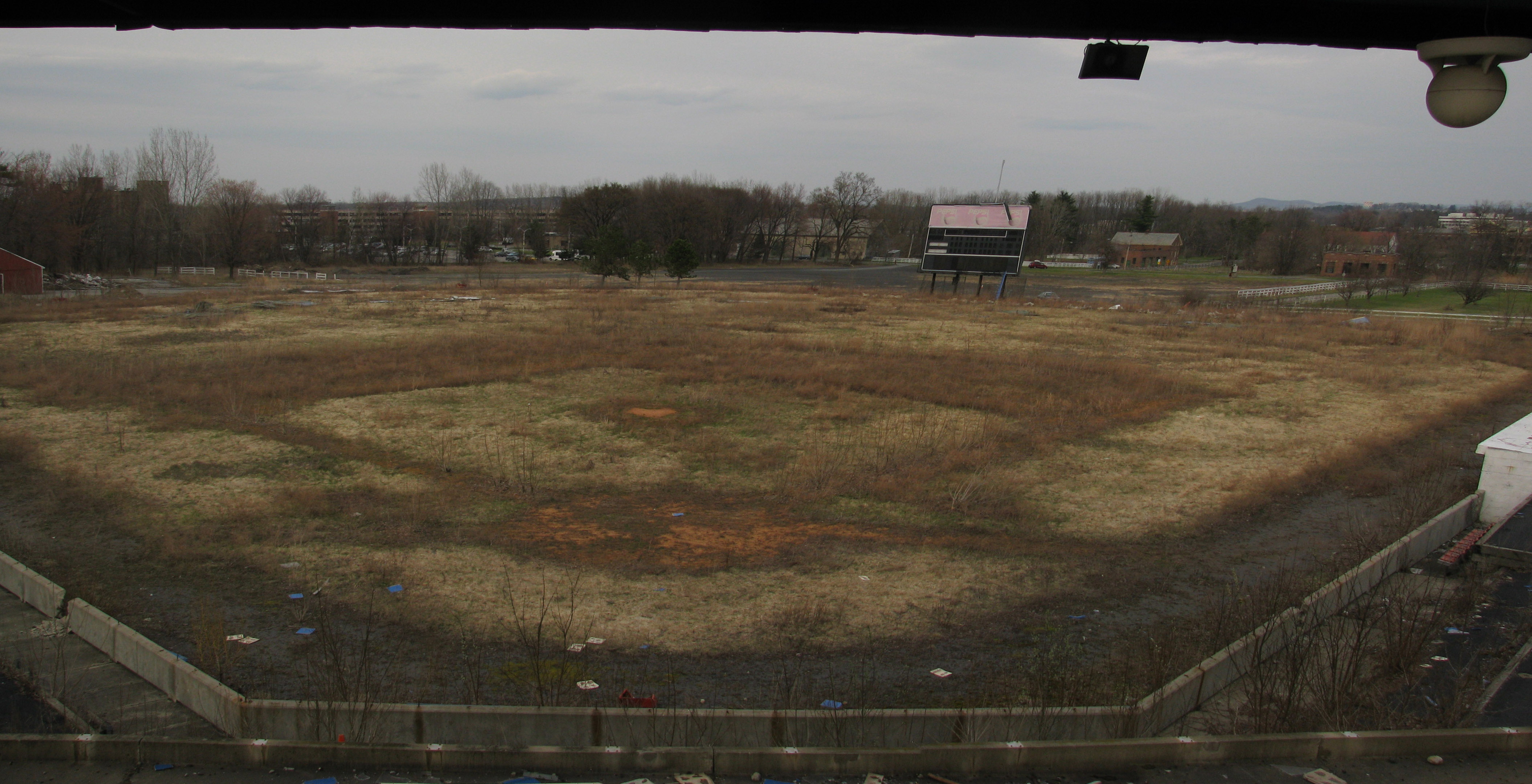
- The abandoned Heritage Park in 2009
- Interactive map of Heritage Park
- Location: Colonie, New York
- Coordinates: 42.740193°N 73.816967°W
- Capacity: 5,500
- Surface: Grass

Construction
- Opened: 1982
- Closed: 2002
- Demolished: 2009

Tenants
- Albany–Colonie A’s (1982–1984); Albany–Colonie Yankees (1985–1994); Albany Alleycats (1995); Albany–Colonie Diamond Dogs (1995–2002); Siena Saints football (1998-2002)

Heritage Park was a stadium in Colonie, New York, USA. It was primarily used for baseball but was also used for high school and college football games. It had a capacity of 5,500.

== History ==
Heritage Park opened in 1982 and primarily served as a minor league baseball ballpark. It was home to the Albany–Colonie A's, the Albany–Colonie Yankees, and the Albany–Colonie Diamond Dogs. Since the Diamond Dogs left in 2002, the facility had been without any tenants. Although there had been no regular maintenance, the ballpark stood just west of the Albany International Airport until demolition was completed in 2009. The stadium was supposed to be razed to make way for a new nursing home, but the plans fell through when it was discovered that the property had become too valuable. The contents of Heritage Park were sold at auction in August 2005.

== Demolition ==
In July 2009, demolition of the stadium began. In August 2009, the park demolition was completed.

== Tenants ==
- Albany–Colonie A's (1982–84)
- Albany–Colonie Yankees (1985–94)
- Siena Saints football (1998–2002)
- Albany–Colonie Diamond Dogs (1995–2002)
