= Trenton Thunder Ballpark =

Baseball stadium in Trenton, New Jersey

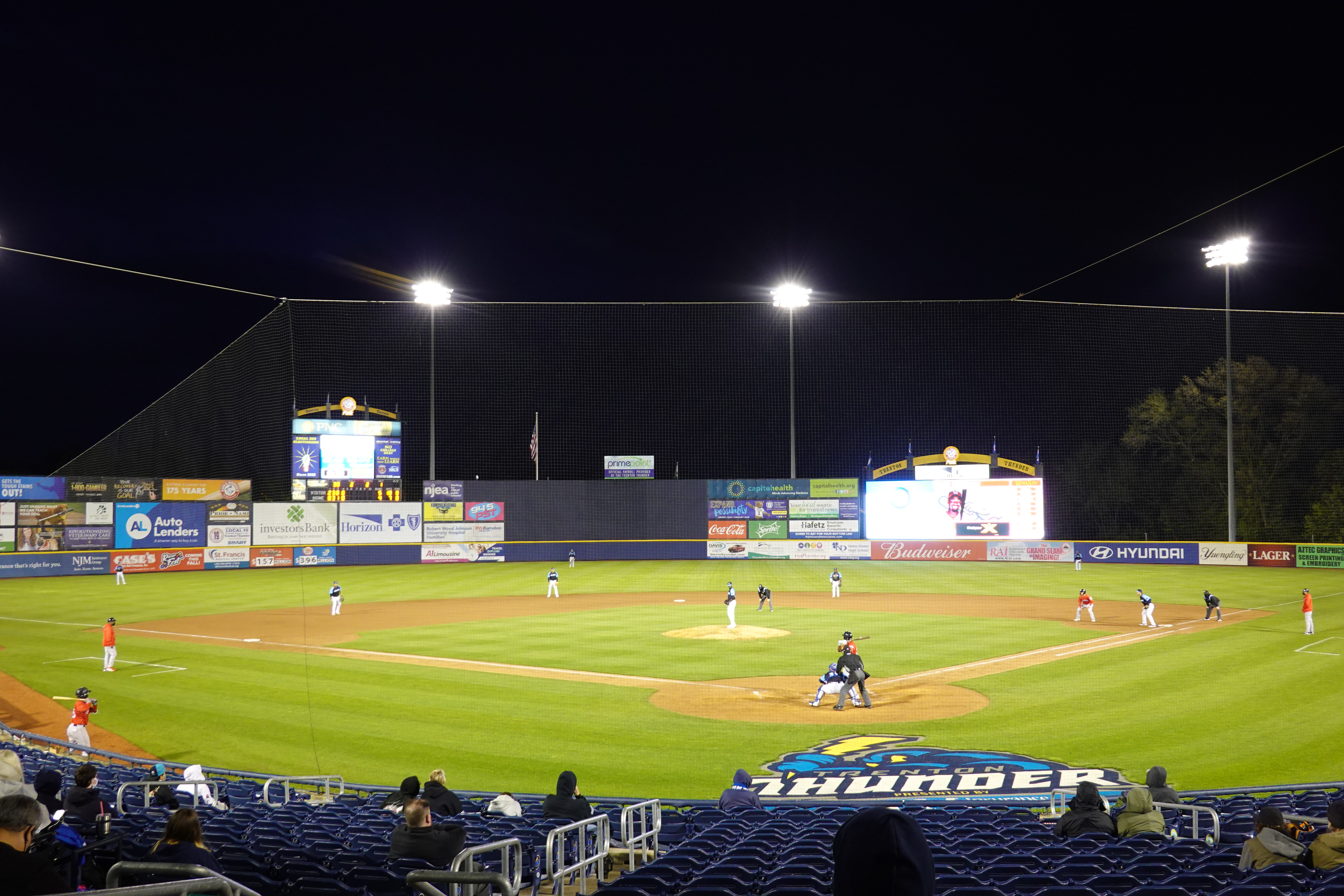
- Interactive map of Trenton Thunder Ballpark
- Former names: Mercer County Waterfront Park (1994–2012); Arm & Hammer Park (2012–2021)
- Location: 1 Thunder Road; Trenton, NJ 08611
- Coordinates: 40.2032°N 74.7609°W
- Owner: Mercer County
- Operator: Garden State Baseball, LP
- Capacity: 6,440
- Surface: Grass
- Field size: Left Field: 330 feet (100 m); Center Field: 407 feet (124 m); Right Field: 330 feet (100 m)
- Public transit: River Line at Cass Street

Construction
- Groundbreaking: September 29, 1993
- Opened: May 9, 1994
- Cost: $16.2 million ($35.2 million in 2025 dollars)
- Architects: Clarke & Caton; Faridy Thorne Fraytak P. C.
- Project manager: Burris Construction Company- Phase 2
- Structural engineers: Harrison-Hamnett, P.C.
- Services engineers: Paulus, Sokolowski & Sartor, LLC.
- General contractors: V.J. Scozzari & Sons Inc.- Phase 1

Tenants
- Trenton Thunder (EL/MLBDL) 1994–present Buffalo Bisons (AAAE) 2021

Trenton Thunder Ballpark, formerly known as Mercer County Waterfront Park and Arm & Hammer Park, is a ballpark in Trenton, New Jersey. It is the home park for the Trenton Thunder, a collegiate summer baseball team of the MLB Draft League. They were previously a Double-A level Minor League Baseball team of the Eastern League (1994–2020). For 2021, it served as temporary home of Triple-A East's Buffalo Bisons, as their regular stadium, Sahlen Field, was being used by the Toronto Blue Jays due to travel restrictions brought on by the COVID-19 pandemic. The official seating capacity is 6,440.

== History ==
The park was built for the 1994 season, although it opened several weeks late due to a rough winter that hampered construction. The sod also was unable to take properly that season, and the field did not properly drain, leading to rainouts on evenings where the sun had been out since noon. The drainage problem was fixed in 1995.

The stadium was originally named the Mercer County Waterfront Park when it opened. In 1999, a year after former Trenton Thunder team owner Samuel J. Plumeri Sr. died, the field at the park was named after him, in honor of his role in bringing minor league baseball back to Trenton. In November 2012, the New Jersey–based Church and Dwight company / Arm & Hammer purchased the ballpark's naming rights. Following the 2020 season the sponsorship was discontinued as the professional minor league Thunder lost their affiliation as part of the 2021 reorganization of Minor League Baseball.

On July 8, 1996, the ballpark hosted the Double-A All-Star Game in which a team of National League-affiliated All-Stars defeated a team of American League-affiliated All-Stars, 6–2, before 8,369 people in attendance.

In June 2014, the park hosted the first-ever, gold- and bronze-medal games in baseball for the Special Olympics USA National Games. In 2018, it hosted the Eastern League All-Star Game.

=== Attendance records ===
The ballpark set a record for game attendance on July 3, 2011, when the Thunder played the Altoona Curve. The game had the fortune of falling on the Independence Day holiday weekend, as well as featuring an injury rehabilitation appearance by Derek Jeter of the New York Yankees, the Thunder's major league affiliate at the time. The official attendance for the game was 9,212.

When Alex Rodriguez played two games on back-to-back nights in August 2013, the official attendance was reported at 8,080 and 8,113, respectively.

== Features ==
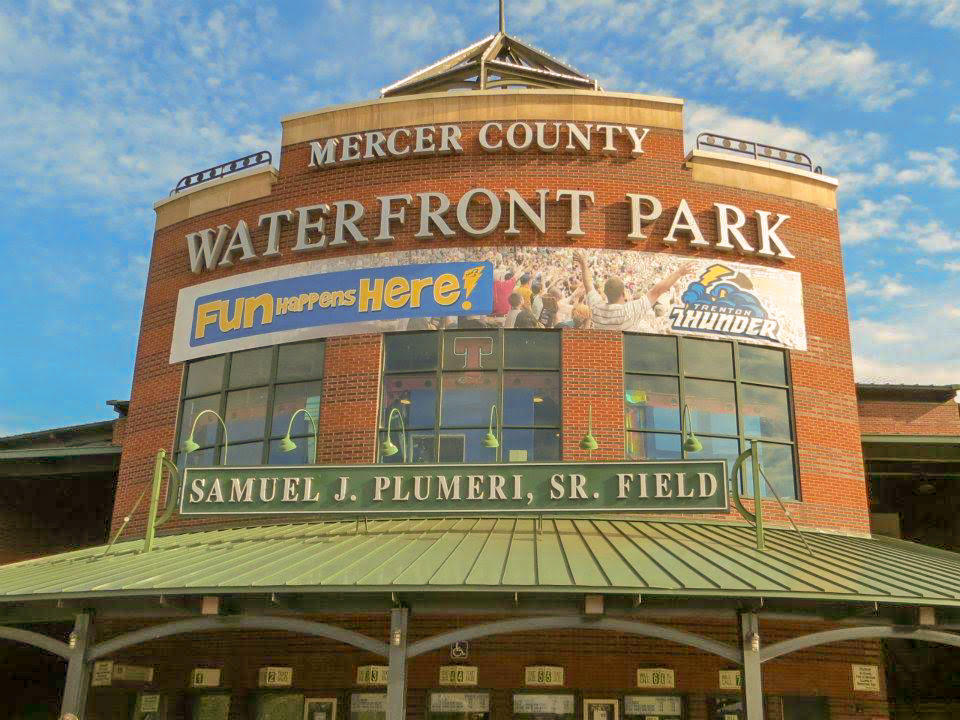
The exterior of Waterfront Park in Trenton.

While the outfield in left and center field is covered with advertising signs that obscure views of Route 29 and nearby houses, the right field fence was kept as a short structure so that fans could see the Delaware River and Pennsylvania beyond. The river is also an inviting target for left-handed sluggers, several of whom have deposited baseballs into the water. Similar to Great American Ball Park in Cincinnati, Ohio and its river border with Kentucky, the ballpark also holds the possibility of having someone "hit one out of the state" since the middle of the Delaware River is the border with Pennsylvania.

On June 7, 1994, Tony Clark became the first player to hit a fair ball into the Delaware.

The stadium anchors an area of rejuvenation in Trenton that also includes office buildings, nightclubs, and the CURE Insurance Arena, several blocks away, for ice hockey, basketball and arena football.

Events and tenants
Preceded by Labatt Memorial Park	Home of the Trenton Thunder; 1994 – present	Succeeded by Present
Preceded by Sahlen Field	Home of the Buffalo Bisons; 2021	Succeeded by Sahlen Field
