= Le Moyne Dolphins baseball =

- 2026 Le Moyne Dolphins baseball team
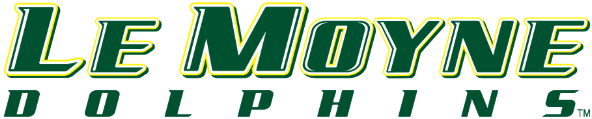
- Founded: 1948
- Overall record: 1,489–961–10
- University: Le Moyne College
- Head coach: Scott Cassidy (16th season)
- Conference: Northeast Conference
- Location: DeWitt, New York
- Home stadium: Dick Rockwell Field
- Nickname: Dolphins
- Colors: Green and gold

College World Series appearances
- Division II: 1978, 1979, 1981

NCAA tournament appearances
- Division II; 1975, 1976, 1977, 1978, 1979, 1980, 1981, 1982, 1983, 1985, 1986, 1987, 2012, 2018, 2022 Division I 1989, 2003, 2004, 2007

Conference tournament champions
- Northeast-10 Conference: 2012

Conference regular season champions
- Northeast-10 SW Division: 2018, 2023

The Le Moyne Dolphins baseball team is the varsity intercollegiate athletic team of the Le Moyne College in DeWitt, New York, United States. The team competes in the National Collegiate Athletic Association's Division I, and has been a member of the Northeast Conference since 2024. They will become full members in the 2027 season, after finishing the four-year NCAA Division I reclassification period. Previously, the Dolphins had played in NCAA Division II in two separate stints. They participated as affiliate members of the MAAC from 1990 until 2007 while their primary membership remained in Division II conferences during that time. After competing as an independent for a few years due to NCAA bylaws regarding single-sport Division I membership, Le Moyne's baseball program joined the Northeast-10, where it was a primary member, until it moved back to Division I in 2024.

The 1989 team is best known for their play in an NCAA tournament game in which they rallied from a 14–0 deficit to defeat Penn 18-16. Their subsequent victory the same night over Arizona State had them one win away from the College World Series. While they lost to Arkansas the next day, the 1989 team was honored with induction into the Athletics Hall of Fame.
