= Marist Red Foxes baseball =

- 2026 Marist Red Foxes baseball team
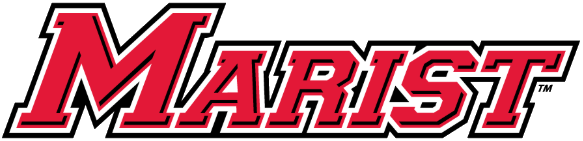
- Founded: 1991; 35 years ago
- University: Marist University
- Head coach: Lance Ratchford (4th season)
- Conference: MAAC
- Location: Poughkeepsie, New York, United States
- Home stadium: James J. McCann Baseball Field (Capacity: 350)
- Nickname: Red Foxes
- Colors: Red and white

NCAA tournament appearances
- 1997, 2000, 2001, 2002, 2005, 2009, 2017

Conference tournament champions
- NEC: 1997; MAAC: 2000, 2001, 2002, 2005, 2009, 2017

Conference regular season champions
- 2002, 2005

The Marist Red Foxes baseball team is a varsity intercollegiate athletic team of Marist University in Poughkeepsie, New York, United States. The team is a member of the Metro Atlantic Athletic Conference, which is part of the National Collegiate Athletic Association's Division I. The team plays its home games at James J. McCann Baseball Field in Poughkeepsie, New York. Baseball was added to the Marist Athletic Department in the fall of 1990 and their inaugural season was 1991. The Red Foxes are coached by Lance Ratchford.

== Postseason history ==
The program has appeared in six NCAA Division I Baseball Championships, as of the end of the 2013 season.

The first came in 1997, with a team led by All-American Mark Barron and two future Major League draftees, Jorge Santiago and Mike Speckhardt. The Red Foxes qualified for the tournament by winning the NEC tournament and appeared in the East Regional, hosted by Florida State University. The Foxes went 0–2 in the Regional, losing to No. 4 Florida State 4–2 in their first game.

In 2000, the Red Foxes swept through the MAAC tournament to win the conference championship. In the Lafayette Regional, the team won the program's first NCAA tournament game, 6–5 over McNeese State. It also lost 8–7 in 11 innings against top-seeded East Carolina. Senior catcher Anthony Ambrosini and sophomore Anthony Bocchino were both named to the All-Regional Team. The Red Foxes also had two All-America nominees in Bocchino (.404 batting average and 90 hits) and freshman pitcher Kevin Ool (6–4, 2.42 ERA).

In 2001, the Red Foxes earned their second consecutive MAAC title, extending their tournament unbeaten streak to five games. The 2001 team also had a successful tournament. In the Palo Alto Regional, the Red Foxes defeated Long Beach State, which had the second-highest number of draft picks in the country in that year's Major League Baseball draft. The 2001 team had two All-Americans (Anthony Bocchino and Tim Bittner). Bittner was drafted in the 10th round by the Chicago White Sox. Rookie left-hander Chris Tracz was named to the Louisville Slugger/Baseball America All-Rookie Team, after posting a 10–1 record (with his only loss coming against nationally ranked Stanford).

The 2002 team won a program-record 41 games, also winning the program's first MAAC Regular season Title. The team won the MAAC Tournament and extended its tournament win streak to eight games, going undefeated in the tournament for the third consecutive season. The team was seeded third in the Lincoln Regional. In the opener, they upset Southwest Missouri State, 5–4, with an 11th-inning home run, to advance to the winner's bracket. The win marked the third straight season in which Marist won an NCAA Regional game. Bocchino was named MAAC Player of the Year and was drafted in the 11th round by the Pittsburgh Pirates. Bocchino earned Second Team All-America honors for the second straight year, as well. Tracz won 10 games for the second straight season and was named the MAAC Pitcher of the Year.

The 2005 team rebounded from a 1–11 start to finish the season at 33–19 and win its second MAAC Regular season Championship. Marist again swept through the MAAC Tournament, defeating Niagara, 5–3, in the final to capture its fourth tournament championship in six years and to qualify for the program's fifth NCAA tournament. The Red Foxes traveled to the Baton Rouge Regional, which included LSU, Rice and Northwestern State. Marist led No. 18 LSU Tigers 4–0 early in the Regional opener, but went on to lose the game.

== Rivalries ==
Since 2006, Marist has played Army in the Hudson Valley Baseball Classic at Dutchess Stadium in Fishkill, NY. Many Marist players refer to the annual showdown with Army as the "Hudson Valley Death Match." The game is usually highlighted by Cadets parachuting onto the field and presenting the game ball and an impressive fireworks show.

Year	Champion	Final score	Winning pitcher
2019	Marist	11-5	Zane Kmietek
2018	Marist	15-7	Brandon Bonomo
2017	Army	4-1	Drake Titus
2016	Army	8–3	Patrick Gardner
2015	Marist	3–2	Charlie Jerla
2014	Army	4–2	Julian Larimer
2013	Army	10–3	Brian Hapeman
2012	Marist	6–3	Rich Vrana
2011	Marist	15–7	Brendan Chapin
2010	Army	4–3	Ken Jackson
2009	Army	10–3	Tyler Anderegg
2008	Marist	11–2	Brendan Chapin
2007	Marist	7–6	Robert Ryan
2006	Army	6–1	Drew Clothier

== See also ==
- List of NCAA Division I baseball programs
