= Saint Peter's Peacocks baseball =

Varsity intercollegiate athletic team in Jersey City, New Jersey

- 2026 Saint Peter's Peacocks baseball team
- Founded: 1960; 66 years ago
- University: Saint Peter's University
- Head coach: Joe Haumacher (1st season)
- Conference: MAAC
- Location: Jersey City, New Jersey
- Home stadium: Joseph J. Jaroschak Field
- Nickname: Peacocks
- Colors: Blue and white

Conference tournament champions
- MAAC: 1994

The Saint Peter's Peacocks baseball team is a varsity intercollegiate athletic team of Saint Peter's University in Jersey City, New Jersey, United States. The team is a member of the Metro Atlantic Athletic Conference, which is part of the National Collegiate Athletic Association's Division I. The team plays its home games at Joseph J. Jaroschak Field in Jersey City, New Jersey. Saint Peter's has never made the NCAA Division I baseball tournament. Their best chance came in 1994, when they won the MAAC tournament. At the time, certain tournament winners were not given an NCAA bid automatically, and thus Saint Peter's was tasked to play Atlantic 10 member West Virginia in an "NCAA Play-In Series". They lost 8-2 and 8-3 while the Mountaineers went to the NCAA tournament.

== Head coaches ==
Records are through the end of the 2024 season

Year(s)	Coach	Seasons	W–L–T	Pct
1958, 1960	Jerry Molloy	2	14–14	.500
1969	Jerry Molloy/Dan Binetti	1	10–7–2	.526
1970	Jerry Molloy	1	9–8	.529
1971–1980	Ben Brancato	10	85–125–4	.397
1981–1998	Bruce Sabatini	18	231–387–3	.372
1999–2001	Dan Olear	3	22–116	.159
2002–2004	Jimmy Walsh	3	27–103	.208
2005–2012	Derek England	8	129–284	.312
2013	Sean Cashman	1	17–34	.333
2014–2016	T. J. Baxter	3	31–121	.204
2017–2019	Danny Ramirez	3	7–126	.053
2020–2022	Lou Proietti	3	14–79	.151
2023–2025	Grant Neary	3	32–118	.213
2026	TJ Ward	1	5–47	.096
Totals	14 coaches	60 seasons	633–1569–9	.288

Taken from the Saint Peter's Baseball 2020 Record Book

== Major League Baseball ==
Saint Peter's has had 8 Major League Baseball draft selections since the draft began in 1965.

Peacocks in the Major League Baseball Draft
Year	Player	Round	Team
1966	Vincent Petrarca	28	Braves
1974	Frank Terriogo	7	Twins
1980	James Clark	21	Tigers
1984	Peter Venturini	13	White Sox
1990	Mike Guilfoyle	19	Tigers
1999	Frank Brooks	13	Phillies
2008	Santo Maertz	44	Cardinals
2010	Conor Mullee	24	Yankees

== See also ==
- List of NCAA Division I baseball programs
