= Duffy (surname) =

Duffy is a surname of Irish origin that comes from the original Irish name Ó Dubhthaigh, meaning descendant of Dubthach. Dubthach was an Old Irish first name meaning "black".

Variations include: Duffey, Duffee, Duff, Duthie, O'Duffey, O'Duffy, Duffe, O'Duffe, Dufficy, Doey, Dohey, Doohey, Duhig, Duhigg, Dowey and O'Dowey. The name originates from Connacht.

It may refer to:

== Irish ==
- Charles Gavan Duffy, Irish nationalist poet, later Australian colonial politician
- Chris Duffy, several people
- David Duffy (banker) (born 1960/61), Irish banker
- Eamon Duffy, historian
- Francis Noel Duffy, Irish Green Party politician, TD for Dublin South-West since 2020
- Gabriel Duffy, Irish writer
- George Gavan Duffy, Irish politician
- James Duffy (Irish publisher), an Irish publisher of Nationalist and Roman Catholic books, bibles and religious texts
- James Duffy (VC), Irish recipient of the Victoria Cross in 1917
- Jim Duffy (journalist), author, political commentator, and Irish advisor to Australia's Republic Advisory Committee
- Joe Duffy, Irish radio personality
- Joseph Duffy (bishop), Irish Catholic bishop
- Keith Duffy, Irish musician from Boyzone
- Luke Duffy, trade unionist and politician
- Mark Duffy (banker), Irish banker
- Martin Duffy (filmmaker), Irish filmmaker and writer
- Mik Duffy, Irish filmmaker and journalist on film
- Shane Duffy, Irish footballer
- Thomas Duffy (VC) (1805–1858), Irish recipient of the Victoria Cross in 1857

== Australian ==
- Bill Duffy (1866–1959), sportsman
- Charles Gavan Duffy (1816–1903), Irish nationalist poet, later Australian colonial politician
- Frank Gavan Duffy (1852–1936), judge
- Kevin Duffy (footballer) (1897–1977) Australian footballer
- Max Duffy (born 1993), player of Australian and American football

== New Zealand ==
- Ron Duffy, New Zealand rugby league footballer

== Scottish ==
- Amanda Duffy (died 1992), Scottish murder victim
- Carol Ann Duffy, Poet Laureate of the United Kingdom
- Darryl Duffy, Scottish football player
- Jim Duffy (footballer), former football (soccer) player and manager
- Neil Duffy Sr., Scottish footballer
- Neil Duffy Jr., Scottish-South African footballer (son of above)

== Welsh ==
- Aimée Duffy, real name of Welsh singer Duffy
- Richard Duffy, Welsh footballer

== English ==
- Adam Duffy, English professional snooker player
- Billy Duffy, British musician
- Brian Duffy (photographer), British photographer
- Brian Duffy, real name of British drummer Jet Black of The Stranglers
- Christopher Duffy, British historian
- Hetha Duffy, co-founder of Bluemoose Books
- John Duffy and David Mulcahy, British murderers
- Kevin Duffy (publisher), co-founder of Bluemoose Books
- Martin Duffy, keyboardist with Primal Scream
- Maureen Duffy, English poet, playwright, novelist and non-fiction author
- Nick Duffy, British songwriter
- Patrick Duffy (British politician)
- Paul Duffy, bass guitarist for The Coral
- Peter Duffy, British Barrister
- Philip Duffy, English composer of sacred music
- Stephen Duffy, British songwriter

== North American ==
- Barbara Duffy (born 1959), American dancer
- Brian Duffy (astronaut), American astronaut
- Bruce Duffy, Irish-American novelist, author of The World as I Found It
- Charles John Duffy, American WWII pilot, namesake of USS Duffy
- Chris Duffy (baseball), American baseball player
- Danny Duffy, American baseball player
- Helen Duffy, American actress, known for Breakdown
- Francis P. Duffy, Canadian-American Catholic priest
- Gerald Duffy, American screenwriter
- Hugh Duffy, American baseball player
- J. C. Duffy, American cartoon artist
- James E. Duffy Jr., United States Democratic Party nominee for the Hawaii Supreme Court
- Jimmy Duffy, Irish-Canadian distance runner
- Jim Duffy (baseball coach) (born 1974), American college baseball coach
- Jo Duffy, American comics book writer
- John Duffy (soccer), U.S. soccer player at 1928 Summer Olympics
- John A. Duffy, American Roman Catholic bishop
- Julia Duffy, American actress
- Karen Duffy, American model and actress
- Kevin Duffy (1933–2010), American judge
- Kiera Duffy, opera singer
- Matt Duffy, American baseball player
- Megan Duffy (born 1984), American basketball player and coach
- Megan Duffy (actress) (born 1979), American actress and producer
- Meghan Duffy, American biologist
- Mike Duffy, Canadian senator, retired television journalist
- Pat Duffy, American skateboarder
- Patricia Lynne Duffy, synesthete
- Patrick Duffy (born 1949), American television actor
- Robert Duffy (politician), American mayor
- Roger Duffy (architect), American architect
- Romney Duffey, American/Canadian scientist
- F. Ryan Duffy, American politician
- Sean Duffy, a politician from Wisconsin
- Thomas C. Duffy, composer, conductor, Yale University professor
- Thomas J. Duffy, American craftsman/designer
- Troy Duffy, American actor and film director
- Uriah Duffy, bass player in Whitesnake and many other bands

== Multiple entries ==
- James Duffy (disambiguation)
- Martin Duffy (disambiguation)
- Michael Duffy (disambiguation)
- William Duffy (disambiguation)

== Duffey ==
- A. D. Duffey, California legislator
- Arthur Duffey, American athlete
- Doug Duffey, American blues musician
- Eliza Bisbee Duffey, American feminist
- George Frederick Duffey, President of the Royal College of Physicians of Ireland
- Ike Duffey, American businessman and sports executive
- Jett Duffey, American football quarterback
- Jim Duffey, Virginia Secretary of Technology, 2010–2014
- Joe Duffey, rugby union
- John Duffey (soldier), American soldier who fought in the American Civil War
- John Duffey, American bluegrass musician
- Joseph Duffey, American academic administrator
- Mike Duffey, Ohio politician
- Romney Duffey, American nuclear scientist
- Thomas J. Duffey, member of the Wisconsin State Assembly
- Todd Duffey, American actor
- Tyler Duffey, American baseball player
- Warren J. Duffey, U.S. Representative from Ohio
- William S. Duffey Jr., United States District Judge

== Fictional character ==
- Officer Duffy, corrupt police officer in RoboCop 2; played by Stephen Lee (actor)
- Kieran Duffy, fictional character from Red Dead Redemption 2

== See also ==
- Duff (surname)
- Dufy, a French surname
