= Duffy =

Duffy may refer to:

== People ==
- Duffy (surname), people with the surname Duffy or Duffey
- Duffy (nickname)
- Duffy (singer) (born 1984), Welsh singer, born Aimee Ann Duffy

== Places ==
- Duffy, Australian Capital Territory, a suburb of Canberra
- Duffy, Ohio, United States, an unincorporated community
- Duffy, West Virginia, United States, an unincorporated community
- Duffy Fairgrounds, a stadium in New York, United States
- Duffy's Hill, a hill in Manhattan, New York
- Duffy's Peak, a hill or butte in Texas, United States
- Duffy Peak, a mountain on Alexander Island, Antarctica

== Arts and entertainment ==
- Duffy the Disney Bear, an anthropomorphic teddy bear character featured at Disney theme parks
- Duffy (film), a 1968 comedy starring James Coburn
- Duffy (novel), a 1980 novel by Julian Barnes writing as Dan Kavanagh
- Tristan Duffy, a fictional character in American Horror Story

== Other uses ==
- USS Duffy (DE-27), a US Navy destroyer

== See also ==
- Duffy antigen system, a type of cell marker proteins and the gene which codes for them
- Duffy site, an archaeological site in Illinois, United States
- Duffy Square, part of Times Square in New York City, United States
- Duffy & Snellgrove, an Australian book publishing company
- Duffey (disambiguation)
- Duffie, a surname
- Dufy, a surname
- O'Duffy, a surname
