= Duffie =

Duffie or Duffié is a surname. Notable people with the surname include:

- Alfred N. Duffié (1833–1880), French-American soldier and diplomat who served in the Crimean War and the American Civil War
- Ann Davison Duffie (1923–2018), American civic leader and musician
- Darrell Duffie (born 1954), Canadian economist
- Grace Duffie Boylan (1861–1935), American writer
- John Duffie (born 1945), former pitcher in Major League Baseball
- Kieran Duffie (born 1992), professional Football player
- Marion Davison Duffie (1896–1965), American singer and voice teacher
- Matt Duffie (born 1990), professional rugby league player
- Paul Duffie (born 1951), former politician, lawyer and judge in the Canadian province of New Brunswick
- William R. Duffie (1931–1999), forestry engineer and political figure in New Brunswick, Canada

== See also ==
- Duffy
