= Chuta Kimura =

Japanese artist

- 木村忠太
- Born: February 25, 1917; Takamatsu, Japan
- Died: July 3, 1987 (aged 70); Paris, France
- Other names: Kimura, Kimoura
- Notable work: The Garden at Clos-Saint-Pierre
- Honours: Chevalier de l'Ordre des Arts et des Lettres

Chuta Kimura (木村忠太, Kimura Chūta, 1917–1987), often known professionally as simply Kimura, was a Japanese artist known for his landscape paintings of France.

== Biography ==
Kimura was born on February 25, 1917 in Takamatsu, Japan. He was a descendant of a local samurai. His father owned a real estate development company. From a young age, Kimura was interested in art and nature. He attended Takamatsu Kōgei Gakkō, a school of decorative arts, from age 13 to 15. After falling ill, Kimura dropped out of school and began reading about Western art and artists, becoming particularly inspired by the work of Picasso and the French Fauvists. Around this time, he began painting, and eventually attended an academy of fine arts in Tokyo.

In 1937, Kimura was conscripted for military service and was sent to the countryside of Guangdong, China, and later briefly in Taiwan. He was struck and inspired by the landscapes he witnessed while on a farm near Guangzhou. While on a temporary reprieve from service in 1941 or 1942, Kimura saw a terrace scene painted by French artist Pierre Bonnard in a gallery in Kurashiki. Bonnard's use of light, color, and tranquility in his French landscape scenes helped spark Kimura's later interest in painting similar scenes.

Between two stints in the military, Kimura's artistic output suffered during World War II as he faced illness, shortages of art materials, and a rigid, highly academic art culture fostered in Tokyo.

After the war, in 1948, Kimura was reacquainted with Bonnard's work at an exhibition of French artists in Tokyo. Kimura was so moved by the work that he and his newly-married wife, Sachiko Yunioki, decided to move to France. After securing patronage from Kan Kuriki, the president of the Miike coal mine, Kimura and his wife went to France in 1953, and settled in Paris. The couple lived in France for the remainder of Kimura's life. Despite living in France for over 30 years, Kimura never learned to speak French, and instead often relied on his wife to provide interpretation.

Kimura held his first French exhibition in 1955, and exhibited in the Biennale de Paris in 1957. His first American exhibition was held at the David Findlay Galleries in 1958. In 1966, Kimura had his first solo exhibition in Japan, which led the National Museum of Modern Art, Tokyo to acquire one of his landscapes and to a number of additional solo shows across the country both during his lifetime and after his death.

From 1967, Kimura began spending every spring and summer at a friend's estate, "Le Clos-Saint-Pierre", near Cannes. The garden became the inspiration for many of Kimura's works, including a 20-part series of oil pastels created between 1983 and 1984.

In 1983, the French Ministry of Culture awarded Kimura the Chevalier de l'Ordre des Arts et des Lettres.

In 1985, the Phillips Collection in Washington, DC presented the first museum exhibition of Kimura's works in the United States, Kimura: Paintings and Works on Paper 1968-1984.

Kimura died in Paris in 1987.

== Artistic influences ==
While Kimura is often noted as being especially inspired by Pierre Bonnard, contemporary critics noted that his art reflected a unique melding of Japanese and Western art conventions more broadly.

Even though Kimura only returned to Japan a handful of times after moving to France in 1953, his work was widely admired and commercially successful in Japan, where he was marketed as a Japanese Henri Matisse. Mary S. Cowen, Denys Sutton, and other Western critics of Kimura's work have also noted the influence of Japanese calligraphy and the coloring of ukiyo-e prints on Kimura's paintings.

Other American critics like Melissa Meyer drew connections between Kimura and American Abstract Expressionist artists like Willem de Kooning and Franz Kline. Kimura himself, as well as critic Arthur Danto, considered Kimura's art to be in the tradition of Claude Monet, sharing an interest in exploring light and the effects of light. Reviewers of Kimura's 1985 retrospective at the Phillips Collection also noted Van Gogh, Dufy, and Picasso as artists with strong connections to Kimura's works and practice.

In an interview with British art critic Denys Sutton, Kimura said that he believed an artist should "attack his subject with fierceness," like a boxer with an opponent. With reporter Raymond M. Lane, Kimura explained through an interpreter that his approach to painting emerged when he "found two principles of painting, obedience and passion. Of making a picture there is the struggle to express or capture the nature of the subject. Passion is the struggle to do it through the painter's individual experience."

== Selected works ==
- Venice (A) (1965), National Museum of Modern Art, Tokyo, Tokyo, Japan
- Nemours (1966), National Museum of Modern Art, Tokyo, Tokyo, Japan
- Golden Light in the Evening (1974), National Museum of Modern Art, Tokyo, Tokyo, Japan
- Summer in the Pyrenees (1978), The Phillips Collection, Washington, DC
- Landscape: Glen (1980), National Museum of Modern Art, Tokyo, Tokyo, Japan
- Garden at Clos-Saint-Pierre (1984), The Phillips Collection, Washington, DC
