= Chris Duffey (disambiguation) =

Chris Duffey may refer to:

- Chris Duffey (footballer) (Christopher Paul Duffey, born 1952), English footballer, see List of Bury F.C. players (25–99 appearances)
- Chris Duffey (born 1974), American author and executive at Adobe

== See also ==
- Chris Duffy
- Christopher Duffy
