= 2024 in equestrianism =

This article lists the equestrianism sports events for 2024.

- Full 2024 FEI Calendar here.
- FEI Jumping World Cup Series' Calendar 2024/2025 here

== Jumping ==
=== World & Continental Championships ===
- July 11–14: FEI Jumping European Championship for Veterans 2024 in (Italy) San Giovanni in Marignano
- July 15–21: FEI Jumping European Championship for Young Riders, Juniors & Children 2024 in (Netherlands) Kronenberg
- July 25–28: FEI Jumping European Championship for Ponies 2024 in (Belgium) Opglabbeek
- July 30 – August 4: FEI Jumping North American Youth Championship 2024 in (United States) Williamsburg
- September 18–22: FEI WBFSH Jumping World Breeding Championship for Young Horses 2024 in (Belgium) Lanaken
- October 15–20: FEI Jumping South American Championship for U25, Juniors, Pre-Juniors & Children 2024 in (Ecuador) Quito

=== 2024 Global Champions Tour ===
- February 29 – March 2: GCT #1 in (Qatar) Doha
  - Winner: (Belgium) Abdel Saïd
- April 3 – 6: GCT #2 in (United States) Miami Beach
  - Winner: (Republic of Ireland) Michael Duffy
- April 11 – 14: GCT #3 in Mexico City
  - Winner: (Belgium) Nicola Philippaerts
- May 3 – 5: GCT #4 in (China) Shanghai
- May 17 – 19: GCT #5 in (Spain) Madrid
- May 30 – June 1: GCT #6 in (France) Saint-Tropez
- June 6 – 8: GCT #7 in (France) Cannes
- June 21 – 23: GCT #8 in (France) Paris
- June 28 – 30: GCT #9 in (Sweden) Stockholm
- July 4 – 6: GCT #10 in Monaco
- July 18 – 21: GCT #11 in (Germany) Riesenbeck
- August 16 – 18: GCT #12 in (United Kingdom) London
- August 23 – 25: GCT #13 in (Netherlands) Valkenswaard
- August 30 – September 1: GCT #14 in (Italy) Rome
- October 24 – 26: GCT #15 in (United Arab Emirates) Abu Dhabi
- November 20 – 23: GCT #16 in (Saudi Arabia) Riyadh

=== 2024 Longines League of Nations™ ===
- February 8–11: Longines League of Nations™ in (United Arab Emirates) Abu Dhabi
  - Winners: Germany (Christian Kukuk, Jörne Sprehe, David Will & Christian Ahlmann)
- March 19–23: Longines League of Nations™ in (United States) Ocala
  - Winners: Ireland (Daniel Coyle, Cian O'Connor, Darragh Kenny & Shane Sweetnam)
- May 30 – June 2: Longines League of Nations™ in (Switzerland) St. Gallen
- June 20–23: Longines League of Nations™ in (Netherlands) Rotterdam
- October 3–6: Longines League of Nations™ in (Spain) Barcelona

=== 2023/24 FEI Jumping World Cup ===
==== World Cup Final ====
- April 16–20: 2024 FEI Jumping World Cup Final in (Saudi Arabia) Riyadh

=== 2024/25 FEI Jumping World Cup ===
==== World Cup Final ====
- April 2–6, 2025: Longines FEI Jumping World Cup Final in (Switzerland) Basel

==== FEI Jumping World Cup ====
Arab League – Middle East Sub-League

- December 4–7: WC in (Saudi Arabia) Riyadh
- December 11–14: WC in (Saudi Arabia) Riyadh
- December 25–28: WC in (United Arab Emirates) Al Ain
- January 8–11, 2025: WC in (United Arab Emirates) Abu Dhabi
- January 29 – February 1, 2025: WC in (United Arab Emirates) Abu Dhabi
- February 6–8, 2025: WC in Kuwait City
- February 12–15, 2025: WC in (United Arab Emirates) Sharjah

==== FEI Jumping World Cup ====
Arab League – North African Sub-League

- June 6–8: WC in (Egypt) Cairo
- September 19–22: WC in (Morocco) Tetouan
- September 25–29: WC in (Morocco) Rabat
- October 3–6: WC in (Morocco) El Jadida
- October 21–26: WC in (Egypt) Cairo
- October 31 – November 2: WC in (Egypt) Cairo

==== FEI Jumping World Cup ====
Australian League

- March 15–16: WC in (Australia) Shepparton
  - Winner: (Australia) Mattea Davidson
- March 21–23: WC in (Australia) Werribee
  - Winner: (Australia) Samuel Overton
- April 26–27: WC in (Australia) Larapinta
- July 12–13: WC in (Australia) Caboolture
- August 16–17: WC in (Australia) Sydney
- August 23–24: WC in (Australia) Tamworth
- September 13–14: WC in (Australia) Bawley Point
- November 22–24: WC in (Australia) Sale
- December 5–8: WC in (Australia) Sydney

==== FEI Jumping World Cup ====
Central European League – Northern Sub-League

- June 12–16: WC in (Latvia) Riga
- June 20–23: WC in (Czech Republic) Olomouc
- June 26–30: WC in (Czech Republic) Prague
- September 11–15: WC in (Lithuania) Vazgaikiemis
- October 3–6: WC in (Estonia) Tallinn
- November 13–17: WC in (Poland) Warsaw
- December 4–8: WC in (Poland) Poznań

==== FEI Jumping World Cup ====
Central European League – Southern Sub-League

- May 8–12: WC in (Hungary) Szilvásvárad
- May 23–26: WC in (Bulgaria) Tsaratsovo
- May 29 – June 2: WC in (Greece) Athens
- July 10–14: WC in (Hungary) Budapest
- February 19–23, 2025: League Final in (Poland) Kraków*

==== Longines FEI Jumping World Cup ====
China League

- League to be confirmed

==== FEI Jumping World Cup ====
Eurasian League

- April 23–27: WC in (Uzbekistan) Tashkent Viloyat
- May 1–4: WC in (Uzbekistan) Tashkent Viloyat
- May 9–12: WC in (Kazakhstan) Almaty Region
- May 15–19: WC in (Kyrgyzstan) Bishkek
- September 12–15: WC in (Georgia (country)) Tbilisi
- September 19–22: WC in (Georgia (country)) Tbilisi

==== FEI Jumping World Cup ====
Japan League

- April 19–20: WC in (Japan) Osaka
- May 11–12: WC in (Japan) Kakegawa
- June 7–8: WC in (Japan) Nasu
- September 6–7: WC in (Japan) Fuji
- October 25–26: WC in (Japan) Osaka
- November 3–4: WC in (Japan) Kakegawa
- November 29–30: WC in (Japan) Miki

==== FEI Jumping World Cup ====
New Zealand League

- November 2: WC in (New Zealand) Cambridge
- December 14: WC in (New Zealand) Taupō
- January 11, 2025: WC in (New Zealand) Dannevirke
- January 19, 2025: WC in (New Zealand) Woodhill Sands*

==== Longines FEI Jumping World Cup ====
North American League

- September 11–15: WC in (United States) Williamsburg
- October 21–27: WC in (United States) Upper Marlboro
- November 6–9: WC in (Canada) Toronto
- November 11–17: WC in (United States) Las Vegas
- November 20–24: WC in (United States) Arcadia
- January 29 – February 2, 2025: WC in (United States) Thermal
- February 4–9, 2025: WC in (Mexico) Puebla
- February 12–16, 2025: WC in (United States) Ocala

==== FEI Jumping World Cup ====
South African League

- May 5: WC in (South Africa) Midrand
- May 26: WC in (South Africa) Kromdraai
- June 17: WC in (South Africa) Shongweni
- July 14: WC in (South Africa) Brits
- August 14: WC in (South Africa) Shongweni

==== FEI Jumping World Cup ====
South America South League

- April 23–28: WC in (Brazil) Curitiba
- April 25–28: WC in (Argentina) Buenos Aires
- May 10–12: WC in (Argentina) Sol de Mayo
- June 20–23: WC in (Chile) Quillota
- August 20–25: WC in (Brazil) São Paulo
- September 3–8: WC in (Brazil) São Paulo, Santo Amaro
- September 26–29: WC in (Chile) Santiago
- November 20–24: WC in (Brazil) Rio de Janeiro

==== FEI Jumping World Cup ====
South East Asian League

- League to be confirmed

==== Longines FEI Jumping World Cup ====
Western European League

- October 16–20: WC in (Norway) Oslo
- October 24–27: WC in (Finland) Helsinki
- October 30 – November 3: WC in (France) Lyon
- November 7–10: WC in (Italy) Verona
- November 13–17: WC in (Germany) Stuttgart
- November 28 – December 1: WC in (Spain) Madrid
- December 6–8: WC in (Spain) A Coruña
- December 17–23: WC in (United Kingdom) London
- December 26–30: WC in (Belgium) Mechelen
- January 9–12, 2025: WC in (Switzerland) Basel
- January 15–19, 2025: WC in (Germany) Leipzig
- January 23–26, 2025: WC in (Netherlands) Amsterdam
- February 6–9, 2025: WC in (France) Bordeaux
- February 19–23, 2025: WC in (Sweden) Gothenburg

== Dressage ==
=== World & Continental Championships ===
- June 26–30: FEI Dressage Nordic and Baltic Championships for Seniors, U25, Young Riders, Juniors, Children & Ponies 2024 in (Denmark) Skårup
- July 16–21: FEI Dressage European Championships for Young Riders and U25 2024 in (Austria) St. Margarethen
- July 25–28: FEI Dressage European Championship for Children, Juniors & Ponies 2024 in (Belgium) Opglabbeek
- July 30 – August 4: FEI Dressage North American Championship for Juniors, Young Riders and U25 2024 in (United States) Williamsburg
- September 4–8: FEI WBFSH Dressage World Breeding Championship for Young Horses 2024 in (Netherlands) Ermelo
- September 1–8: FEI Dressage Balkan Championships for Seniors, Young Riders, Juniors & Children 2024 in (Turkey) Istanbul

=== 2024 FEI Dressage Nations Cup ===
- February 21–25: FEI Dressage Nations Cup in (United States) Wellington
- May 2-5: FEI Dressage Nations Cup in (France) Compiègne
- May 8–12: FEI Dressage Nations Cup in (Hungary) Budapest
- June 19–23: FEI Dressage Nations Cup in (Netherlands) Rotterdam
- July 1–7: FEI Dressage Nations Cup in (Germany) Aachen
- July 11–14: FEI Dressage Nations Cup in (Sweden) Falsterbo

=== 2023/24 FEI Dressage World Cup ===
==== World Cup Final ====
- April 16–20: 2024 FEI Dressage World Cup Final in (Saudi Arabia) Riyadh

=== 2024/25 FEI Dressage World Cup ===
==== World Cup Final ====
- April 2–6, 2025: Longines FEI Jumping World Cup Final in (Switzerland) Basel

==== FEI Dressage World Cup ====
Pacific League

- March 21–23: WC in (Australia) Werribee
- November 14–15: WC in (Australia) Melbourne
- December 5–8: WC in (Australia) Werribee

==== FEI Dressage World Cup ====
Central European League

- May 14–18: WC in (Hungary) Budapest
- May 23–26: WC in (Czech Republic) Olomouc
- May 23–26: WC in (Estonia) Pärnu
- June 6–9: WC in (Latvia) Riga
- June 7-9: WC in (Slovenia) Lipica
- June 21–23: WC in (Czech Republic) Brno
- July 11–14: WC in (Slovakia) Šamorín
- August 15–18: WC in (Hungary) Máriakálnok
- August 29 - September 1: WC in (Poland) Wierzbna
- September 27–29: WC in (Hungary) Fót
- October 3–6: WC in (Estonia) Tallinn
- October 25–27: WC in (Poland) Wrocław
- October 31 - November 3: WC in (Slovakia) Motešice

==== FEI Dressage World Cup ====
North American League

- September 24–29: WC in (United States) Devon
- October 17–20: WC in (United States) Myakka City
- October 26–27: WC in (Mexico) Lerma
- November 13–17: WC in (United States) Ocala
- November 14–17: WC in (United States) Thermal
- December 11-15: WC in (United States) Ocala
- December 12–15: WC in (United States) Thermal

==== FEI Dressage World Cup ====
Western European League

- October 16–20: WC in (Denmark) Herning
- October 30 – November 3: WC in (France) Lyon
- November 13–17: WC in (Germany) Stuttgart
- November 28 – December 1: WC in (Spain) Madrid
- December 17–23: WC in (United Kingdom) London
- December 26–30: WC in (Belgium) Mechelen
- January 9–12, 2025: WC in (Switzerland) Basel
- January 23–26, 2025: WC in (Netherlands) Amsterdam
- February 13–16, 2025: WC in (Germany) Neumünster
- February 19–23, 2025: WC in (Sweden) Gothenburg
- March 13–16, 2025: WC in (Netherlands) 's-Hertogenbosch

== Eventing ==
=== World & Continental Championships ===
- July 31 – August 4: FEI Eventing European Championship for Ponies 2024 in (Germany) Westerstede
- August 21–25: FEI Eventing European Championship for Young Riders and Juniors 2024 in (Poland) Strzegom
- October 17–20: FEI WBFSH Eventing World Championship for Young Horses 2024 in (France) Le Lion-d'Angers

=== 2024 FEI Eventing Nations Cup ===
- March 14–17: FEI Eventing Nations Cup in (Italy) Montelibretti
  - Individual winner: (France) Benjamin Massie
  - Team winners: France (Benjamin Massie, Maxime Livio, Luc Château & Mathieu Chombart)
- May 17–19: FEI Eventing Nations Cup in (United Kingdom) Chatsworth
- May 30 – June 2: FEI Eventing Nations Cup in (Republic of Ireland) Millstreet
- June 6–9: FEI Eventing Nations Cup in (Switzerland) Avenches
- June 20–23: FEI Eventing Nations Cup in (Poland) Strzegom
- August 15–18: FEI Eventing Nations Cup in (Belgium) Arville
- September 26–29: FEI Eventing Nations Cup in (France) Lignières
- October 10–13: FEI Eventing Nations Cup in (Netherlands) Boekelo

== Driving ==
=== World & Continental Championships ===
- July 22–28: FEI Driving European Championship for Youth 2024 in (Sweden) Flyinge
- September 4–8: FEI Driving World Championship for Four-in-hand 2024 in (Hungary) Szilvásvárad
- September 19–22: FEI Driving World Championship for Single 2024 in (France) Le Pin-au-Haras
- September 26–29: FEI Driving World Championship for Young Horses 2024 in (France) Lamotte-Beuvron

=== 2024/25 FEI Driving World Cup ===
==== World Cup Final ====
- February 8–9, 2025: FEI Driving World Cup Final in (France) Bordeaux

==== World Cup Events ====
- October 30 – November 3: WC in (France) Lyon
- November 7–10: WC in (Netherlands) Maastricht
- November 13–17: WC in (Germany) Stuttgart
- November 28 – December 1: WC in (Sweden) Stockholm
- December 12–15: WC in (Switzerland) Geneva
- December 17–23: WC in (United Kingdom) London
- December 26–30: WC in (Belgium) Mechelen
- January 15–19, 2025: WC in (Germany) Leipzig
- February 6–9, 2025: WC in (France) Bordeaux

== Endurance ==
=== World & Continental Championships ===
- September 7: FEI Endurance World Championship for Seniors 2024 in (France) Monpazier
- September 27: FEI Endurance European Championship for Young Riders & Juniors 2024 in (Italy) Arborea
- September 29: FEI Endurance World Championship for Young Horses 2024 in (Italy) Arborea

== Vaulting ==
=== World & Continental Championships ===
- July 15–17: FEI Vaulting World Championship for Seniors 2024 in (Switzerland) Bern
- July 15–17: FEI Vaulting European Championship for Young Riders & Juniors 2024 in (Switzerland) Bern

=== 2024/25 FEI Vaulting World Cup ===
==== World Cup Final ====
- April 2–6, 2025: Longines FEI Vaulting World Cup Final in (Switzerland) Basel

==== World Cup Qualifiers ====
- March 27–31: CVI3* WCupQ in (Italy) Fossalta di Portogruaro
- March 28–31: CVI3* WCupQ in (France) Saumur
- April 12–15: CVI3* WCupQ in (Australia) Sydney
- April 26–28: CVI3* WCupQ in (Netherlands) Ermelo
- April 26–28: CVI3* WCupQ in (Canada) Langley
- April 26–28: CVI3* WCupQ in (Hungary) Budapest
- May 8–10: CVI3* WCupQ in (United States) Creswell
- May 9–12: CVI3* WCupQ in (Austria) Stadl-Paura
- May 10–12: CVI3* WCupQ in (Finland) Ypäjä
- May 16–19: CVI3* WCupQ in (United States) Woodside
- May 17–20: CVI-Masterclass WCupQual in (Germany) Wiesbaden
- May 23–26: CVI3* WCupQ in (Belgium) Lier
- May 23–26: CVI3* WCupQ in (United States) Castle Rock
- May 24–26: CVI3* WCupQ in (Slovakia) Motešice
- May 30 – June 2: CVI3* WCupQ in (Italy) Villasanta
- June 13–16: CVI3* WCupQ in (Czech Republic) Frenštát pod Radhoštěm
- June 26–30: CVI3* WCupQ in (Denmark) Hjallerup
- June 28–30: CVIO4* WCupQ in (Germany) Aachen
- September 13–16: CVI3* WCupQ in (Canada) Langley
- October 4–6: CVI3* WCupQ in (Poland) Radzionków
- October 11–13: CVI3* WCupQ in (Belgium) Opglabbeek
- December 5–8: CVI3* WCupQ in (Austria) Salzburg
- December 5–8: CVI-Masterclass WCupQual in (Austria) Salzburg

== Horse racing ==
=== United States ===
- May 4: Kentucky Derby in Churchill Downs
- May 18: Preakness Stakes (Maryland) Pimlico
- June 8: Belmont Stakes (New York (state)) Belmont Park
- November 1–2: Breeders Cup (California) Santa Anita Park
