= Heart of a Girl =

Heart of a Girl may refer to:

- The Heart of a Girl, a 1918 film directed by John G. Adolfi
- The Heart of a Girl, an 1891 novel by Zabel Sibil Asadour
- Heart of a Girl, a 1935 novel by Eimar O'Duffy
- "Heart of a Girl", a song by The Killers from Battle Born
