= USS Duffy =

The following ships of the United States Navy can be referred to as USS Duffy;

- USS Duffy (DE-27), an Evarts-class destroyer escort launched and commissioned in 1943. The ship served in the Pacific Theater during World War II until 1945 and was sold for scrap in 1947.
- USS Duffy (DE-268), an Evarts-class destroyer escort transferred to the United Kingdom under Lend-Lease and renamed HMS Dacres as a Captain-class frigate. The ship served with the Royal Navy during World War II, but was returned to the US following its end and was scrapped in 1946.
