= Tivadar Nachéz =

Hungarian violinist and composer

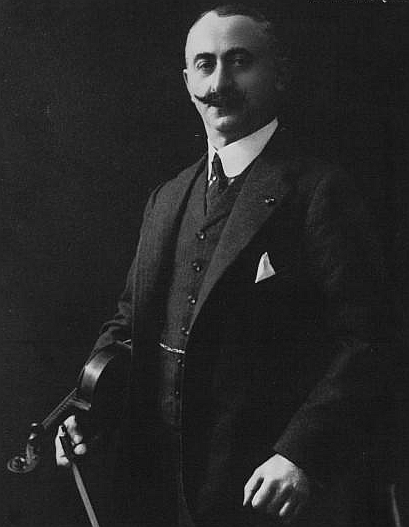
Tivadar Nachéz

Tivadar Nachéz (1 May 1859 – 29 May 1930) was a Hungarian violinist and composer for violin who had an international career, but made his home in London during his career.

Tivadar Nachéz (he himself signed with Nachèz) was born in Budapest, where he studied under Sabathiel, the leader of the orchestra of the Budapest Opera. Franz Liszt heard him and gave his approval. Then he studied under Joseph Joachim in Berlin, and afterwards with Hubert Léonard in Paris.

He performed at the foundation of the Bayreuth Festspielhaus. He made a debut in Hamburg in 1881. His first appearance in the United Kingdom was at the Crystal Palace on 9 April 1881, and after that he gave continuous concerts and made tours in England and elsewhere. He performed twice at a private royal smoking concert held at the Queen's Hall before its official opening in 1893. He performed his own 2nd Violin Concerto, op. 36 with the London Philharmonic Orchestra on 17 April 1907, and repeated it with the New Symphony Orchestra under Landon Ronald on 27 January 1910.

George Bernard Shaw, writing as an arts critic under the pseudonym Corno di Bassetto, saw him at Her Majesty's Theatre in September 1889:

'he plays some easy affair like Raff's Cavatina with the air of a man who is making a masterly conquest of untold difficulties... An encore follows, and he thereupon plays a bravura piece as fast as he can bow it. He has, of course, very little time to spend in aiming at the exact pitch of the notes; but he seems well satisfied when he gets within half a semitone of the bull's eye. But in my opinion a miss is as good as a mile in this sort of work...'

In July 1890, Shaw heard him play Max Bruch's first concerto and remarked, 'Nachez is one of the most musically intelligent violinists we have, but his technique fails him in rapid and difficult movements.' In June and July 1893, Nachéz was playing Beethoven and smaller works in St James's Hall.

His compositions include: Zigeunertänze; Polonaise, Op. 26; Violin concerto in E minor, Op 30; and Passacaglia on a Theme of Sammartini. He produced new editions of two Vivaldi violin concerti (in A minor and G minor) that are found in the Suzuki violin repertoire.

He died in Lausanne, Switzerland.

== Sources ==
- A. Eaglefield-Hull (Ed), A Dictionary of Modern Music and Musicians (Dent, London 1924)
- G.B. Shaw, Music in London 1890-1894, 3 vols (Constable, London 1932)
- G.B. Shaw, London Music in 1888-89 as heard by Corno di Bassetto (Constable, London 1937)
