= Duffy (nickname) =

Duffy is the nickname of:

- Duffy Ayers, English portrait painter born Elizabeth (Betty) Fitzgerald in 1915
- Duffy Cobbs (born 1964), American former football player
- Duffy Daugherty (1915–1987), American college football player and Hall of Fame coach
- Duffy Dyer (born 1945), American former Major League Baseball player
- Duffy Jackson (1953–2021), American jazz drummer
- Duffy Lewis (1888–1979), American Major League Baseball player
- Norma "Duffy" Lyon (1929–2011), American farmer and butter sculptor

== See also ==
- Duffy (disambiguation)
- Duffy (surname)
