= Duffey =

Duffey may refer to:

- Duffey (surname)
- Duffey Peak, a mountain in Canada
- Duffey Strode (born 1977), American street preacher

== See also ==
- Duffy (disambiguation)
