= Marie Hirst Yochim =

American civic leader (1920–2012)

35th President General, National Society Daughters of the American Revolution
- In office 1989–1992
- Preceded by: Ann Davison Duffie Fleck
- Succeeded by: Wayne Garrison Blair

Virginia State Regent, National Society Daughters of the American Revolution
- In office 1977–1980
- President: Jeannette Osborn Baylies
- Preceded by: Katharine Reynolds Stark
- Succeeded by: Nelle Stephenson Rhodes

Personal details
- Born: Marie Boaze Hirst; February 3, 1920 Washington, D.C., U.S.
- Died: April 19, 2012 (aged 92) Arlington, Virginia, U.S.
- Resting place: Oakwood Cemetery
- Spouse: Eldred Martin Yochim (1942–2006; his death)
- Education: Strayer College

Marie Boaze Hirst Yochim (February 3, 1920 – April 19, 2012) was an American civic leader who served as the 35th President General of the Daughters of the American Revolution.

== Early life, family, and education ==
Yochim was born Marie Boaze Hirst on February 3, 1920, in Washington, D.C., the sixth of eight children of Herbert Hirst and Ella Mankin Hirst. She was a descendant of James Thurgood, a settler at Jamestowne, and George Mason, creator of the United States Bill of Rights.

She grew up in Falls Church, Virginia. She was the twelfth generation of her family to live in Virginia and the tenth generation to live in Falls Church, with her earliest ancestor in the town living at Big Chimneys. She was raised Methodist and attended Dulin Methodist Church.

Yochim attended the Jefferson Institute and the Madison School before going to Strayer College.

== Lineage societies ==
Yochim was a member of the Daughters of the American Revolution, the Jamestowne Society, and the United Daughters of the Confederacy.

She joined the Falls Church Chapter of the National Society Daughters of the American Revolution in 1953 and served in various leadership roles in the organization, including as State Regent of Virginia from 1977 to 1980, Organizing Secretary General, and First Vice President General. She was elected as the 35th President General of the national society, serving in this position from 1989 to 1992, meeting with U.S. Presidents Ronald Reagan, George H. W. Bush, and Bill Clinton. After her presidency ended, Yochim served as honorary president general, president of the National Officers Club and on the advisory committee for the Kate Duncan Smith DAR School.

== Personal life ==
She married Eldred Martin Yochim on December 24, 1942, in University City, Missouri. Her husband died at the age of 92 in 2006.

She died on April 19, 2012. Her funeral was held at Columbia Baptist Church in Falls Church on April 27, 2012. She was buried in Oakwood Cemetery.

Yochim was honored posthumously as a grand marshal for Falls Church's Women's History Walk in 2021.
