= Raff =

Raff is a surname of German, English or Old Norse origin.

== Notable people ==
Notable people with this surname include:

- Alexander Raff (1820–1914), Australian politician
- Charles Raff (1878-1948), Australian footballer
- Edson Raff (1907-2003), American army officer
- George Raff (1815-1889), Scottish merchant
- Gerhard Raff (born 1946), German historian
- Gideon Raff (born 1972), Israeli director
- Hans Raff (1910-1990), German runner
- Jennifer Raff (* 1979), American anthropologist
- Joachim Raff (1822-1882), Swiss composer
- Martin Raff (born 1938), Canadian biologist
- Pam Raff (1952-2009), British American dancer
- Rudolf Raff (1942-2019), American biologist

== See also ==
- Riff Raff
