= Bird cage (disambiguation) =

A birdcage is a cage for birds.

Birdcage or bird cage variants may also refer to:

- Maserati Tipo 61
- Flash suppressor on a rifle
- The Birdcage, 1996 American film
- The Bird Cage, a novel by Eimar O'Duffy

== See also ==
- Bird-cage lantern, lantern common to American lighthouses in the early years of the nineteenth century
- Bird Cage Theatre
