= Dowey =

Dowey is a surname. Notable people with the surname include:

- Murray Dowey (1926–2021), Canadian ice hockey goaltender
- Ralph Dowey (1844–1909), British miner, songwriter and poet
- Sharon Dowey (born 1969/1970), British politician

== See also ==
- Duffy (surname)
