= Dubthach =

Dubthach is a masculine personal name in early Ireland. It may refer to:

- Dubthach Dóeltenga, a character in the Ulster Cycle, ally of Fergus
- Dubthach maccu Lugair, legendary Irish poet and lawyer in the time of St Patrick
- Dubthach the First, Bishop of Armagh, Ireland from 497 to 513.
- Dubthach the Second, Bishop of Armagh, Ireland from 536 to 548
- Dubthach (Duthac), Bishop of Ross, Scotland, (1000–1065)

== See also ==
- Duffy (surname)
- Saint Duthac
