= Barbara Duffy =

American dancer and educator

- Born: October 8, 1959 (age 66); Webster, Massachusetts
- Occupations: Dancer, Educator
- Known for: Founding Member of the American Tap Dance Orchestra (ATDO) 1986-1995
- Awards: 2013 American Tap Dance Foundation Hoofer Award

Barbara Duffy (born October 8, 1959) is an American dancer and educator. Duffy performs tap dance, teaches dance, and also choreographs dances. Duffy has formed several dance groups in New York City and has appeared on Sesame Street and 60 Minutes.

== Biography ==
Barbara Duffy was born in Webster, Massachusetts on October 8, 1959. Duffy started dancing at age six, taking lessons from Doris McGeary and went on to study with Esther Dolan in the 1980s. In Brookline, Massachusetts, she studied dance with Leon Collins, C.B. Hetherington, Pam Raff, and Diane Walker. Duffy moved to New York City in 1985, where she became a founding member of the American Tap Dance Orchestra (ATDO) in 1986, which she danced with until 1995. Also in the 1990s, Duffy appeared on Sesame Street, playing a "tap-dancing cowgirl sidekick." She also appeared on 60 Minutes, dancing with Gregory Hines. In 1997, she was chosen by Hines to appear at a presidential gala performance, dancing with Mark Mendonca and Cyd Glover.

Duffy formed a group of dancers, Barbara Duffy and Company in 2000. The dancers included Lynn Schwab, Cintia Chamecki and Pia Neises. The group debuted in Speedball at the New York City Tap Festival in 2001. The group was reorganized in 2007 and again debuted at the festival, dancing 423-4323.

Duffy dances, choreographs dance shows, and teaches dance. She has taught at Steps on Broadway and Broadway Dance Center in New York. In 2013, Duffy was presented with the Hoofer Award from the American Tap Dance Foundation (ATDF).
