= Michael Duffy =

Michael Duffy may refer to:

- Michael Duffy (Australian journalist), Australian crime novelist
- Michael Duffy (Australian politician) (born 1938), Australian politician
- Michael Duffy (Irish politician) (fl. 1922–1936), Irish politician and trade unionist
- Michael Duffy (historian), British historian
- Mike Duffy (born 1946), Canadian journalist and senator
- Michael Duffy (American journalist), American journalist and assistant managing editor for Time magazine
- Michael Duffy (footballer) (born 1994), Northern Irish footballer
- Michael Duffy (Queensland politician) (1850–1926), member of the Queensland Legislative Assembly
- Michael Duffy (equestrian), Irish showjumper

== See also ==
- Mike Duffey (born 1977), American politician
