= O'Duffy =

O'Duffy is a surname. Notable people with the surname include:

- Eimar O'Duffy (1893-1935), member of the Irish Republican Brotherhood and writer
- Eoin O'Duffy (1892-1944), Irish Republican Army Chief of Staff, soldier and police commissioner
- Paul Staveley O'Duffy (born 1963), British music producer
- Seán O'Duffy (1888-1985), Irish sports administrator of women's camogie

== See also ==
- Duffy (surname)
