= Ann Davison Duffie Fleck =

American civic leader and musician

34th President General of the Daughters of the American Revolution
- In office 1986–1989
- Preceded by: Sarah McKelley King
- Succeeded by: Marie Hirst Yochim

Personal details
- Born: Ann Davison Duffie; May 13, 1923 Dorchester, Massachusetts, U.S.
- Died: November 26, 2018 (aged 95) Franklin, Massachusetts, U.S.
- Spouse: Raymond Franklin Fleck
- Parent(s): Harold R. Duffie; Marion Davison
- Education: New England Conservatory of Music; Boston University

Ann Davison Duffie Fleck (May 13, 1923 – November 26, 2018) was an American civic leader and musician. She served as the 34th President General of the Daughters of the American Revolution from 1986 to 1989.

== Early life and education ==
Fleck was born on May 13, 1923, in the Dorchester neighborhood of Boston to Harold R. Duffie and Marion Davison Duffie. She descended from a prominent Philadelphia family and her mother and grandmother had both served as chapter regents in the Daughters of the American Revolution (DAR). One of Fleck's ancestors served as a drummer during the American Revolutionary War, three of her great-great-uncles were drummers during the American Civil War, and her uncle was a drummer in the United States Navy Band during World War I.

She earned a Bachelor of Arts degree in music education from the New England Conservatory of Music and attended graduate school at Boston University.

== Career and civic life ==
Fleck was a music educator and performer in the Boston area, directing several school and church music programs.

She was a drummer in the Massachusetts Sons of the American Revolution Continental Army Color Guard and served in the Honor Guard for Queen Elizabeth II during her bicentennial visit to Boston in 1976. She also played with the Boston Women's Symphony, the Wellesley Symphony, Cambridge Symphony, Berkshire Symphony, and the New Hampshire Philharmonic. She served as the choir director at First Baptist Church in Norwood for over fifty years.

Fleck was a member of the Daughters of the American Colonists, the Colonial Dames XVII Century, the National Society of New England Women, the United States Daughters of 1812.

=== Daughters of the American Revolution ===
Fleck joined the Boston Tea Party Chapter of the Daughters of the American Revolution (DAR) in 1966. She served as State Regent of the Massachusetts DAR and as Recording Secretary General and Historian General for the national society.

As President General, she performed as a percussionist with the United States Army Band and the United States Air Force Band. She also conducted the All-American DAR Chorus.

== Personal life and death ==
She married Raymond Franklin Fleck in 1946. They had two children, William D. Fleck and Carol Fleck Whetzel.

Her funeral was held at First Baptist Church in Norwood and she was buried at Mount Pleasant Cemetery in Harwich Port, Massachusetts.
