= 2012 Metro Atlantic Athletic Conference baseball tournament =

- Teams: 4
- Format: Double-elimination
- Finals site: Joseph L. Bruno Stadium; Troy, NY
- Champions: Manhattan (3rd title)
- Winning coach: Jim Duffy (1st title)
- MVP: Taylor Sewitt (Manhattan)

2012 Metro Atlantic Athletic Conference baseball standings
	Conf.				Overall
Team	W		L	PCT	W		L	PCT
Manhattan ‍†‍‡‍^{y}	18	–	6	.750	33	–	27	.550
Canisius ‍‍‍	16	–	8	.667	33	–	27	.550
Fairfield ‍‍‍	14	–	10	.583	27	–	28	.491
Rider ‍‍‍	13	–	11	.542	22	–	34	.393
Marist ‍‍‍	11	–	12	.478	25	–	25	.500
Iona ‍‍‍	10	–	14	.417	21	–	33	.389
Saint Peter's ‍‍‍	10	–	14	.417	20	–	34	.370
Siena ‍‍‍	8	–	16	.333	18	–	37	.327
Niagara ‍‍‍	7	–	16	.304	19	–	29	.396
† – Conference champion ‡ – Tournament champion y – Invited to the NCAA tournament As of June 30, 2012; Rankings from Collegiate Baseball

The 2012 Metro Atlantic Athletic Conference baseball tournament took place from May 24 through 27. The top four regular season finishers of the league's teams met in the double-elimination tournament held at Siena's Joseph L. Bruno Stadium in Troy, NY. Manhattan won their second consecutive, and third overall, tournament championship and earned the conference's automatic bid to the 2012 NCAA Division I baseball tournament.

== Seeding ==
The top four teams were seeded one through four based on their conference winning percentage. They then played a double-elimination tournament.

Team	W	L	PCT	GB	Seed
Manhattan	18	6	.750	–	1
Canisius	16	8	.667	2	2
Fairfield	14	10	.583	4	3
Rider	13	11	.542	5	4
Marist	11	12	.478	6.5	–
Iona	10	14	.417	8	–
Saint Peter's	10	14	.417	8	–
Siena	8	16	.333	10	–
Niagara	7	16	.304	10.5	–

== Results ==
First round
1	Manhattan	4
4	Rider	6
2	Canisius	2
3	Fairfield	1
Lower round 1
1	Manhattan	1
3	Fairfield	0

Semi-finals
4	Rider	3
2	Canisius	10
Lower final
4	Rider	5
1	Manhattan	6

Finals
2	Canisius	4	2
1	Manhattan	5^{10}	3^{11}

== All-Tournament Team ==
The following players were named to the All-Tournament Team.

Pos.	Name	School
P	Scott Warwick	Fairfield
P	Brett Shulick	Fairfield
3B	Adam Wayman	Rider
P	Tyler Smith	Rider
SS	Ronnie Bernick	Canisius
C	Brooklyn Foster	Canisius
P	Garrett Cortright	Canisius
2B	Nick Camastro	Manhattan
C	Ramon Ortega	Manhattan
OF	Joe Rock	Manhattan
DH	Brendan Slattery	Manhattan

=== Most Valuable Player ===
Taylor Sewitt was named Tournament Most Valuable Player. Sewitt was a pitcher for Manhattan.
