= Flying Saucer Rock'n'Roll =

- Directed by: Enda Hughes
- Starring: Ardal O'Hanlon
- Release date: 1998
- Running time: 12 minutes
- Country: Ireland

Flying Saucer Rock'n'Roll, is a 12-minute spoof of a 1950s black and white science fiction B-movie. It was first released in 1997 and stars Ardal O'Hanlon, Joe Rooney and Tara Costello. It was written by Mik Duffy and its director Enda Hughes.

The title is taken from the 1957 rockabilly novelty hit record "Flyin' Saucers Rock & Roll" by Billy Lee Riley and His Little Green Men. O'Hanlan's "rendition" of the song, is performed by producer Michael Hughes.

Director of Photography Seamus McGarvey went on to establish himself as a cinematographer. Notable credits include High Fidelity (2000), The Name of This Film is Dogme95 (2000), Atonement (2007), Avengers Assemble (2012) and Godzilla (2014).

== Plot ==
A likeable movie-loving loser discovers and thwarts an alien kidnap plan, due to a hearing impairment that renders him immune to the alien's hypnotic sound ray.

The ultimate fate of the victims is reminiscent of The Twilight Zone episode To Serve Man (The Twilight Zone).
