= James Duffy =

James Duffy may refer to:

== Sportsmen ==
- James E. Duffy (American football) (1867–1953), American football player and lawyer
- Jimmy Duffy (1890–1915), Canadian Olympian and winner of the 1914 Boston Marathon
- Jim Duffy (rugby league) (active 1915–1920), rugby league footballer
- James F. Duffy (1892–1961), American football coach
- Jim Duffy (umpire) (1920–2003), American baseball umpire
- Jim Duffy (footballer) (born 1959), Scottish football player and manager with Morton and Dundee
- Jim Duffy (baseball coach) (born 1974), American college baseball coach
- Jamie Duffy (born 1983), Irish footballer in 2007 FAI Cup, 2008 Dundalk F.C. season and 2008 Dundalk F.C. season
- James Duffy, English cricketer in MCC University matches in 2005

== Others ==
- James Terence Duffy (1889-1939), American comedy performer
- James E. Duffy Jr. (born 1942), retired associate justice of the Hawaii State Supreme Court
- James Duffy (Irish publisher) (1809–1871), Irish publisher of Nationalist and Roman Catholic books, bibles and religious texts
- James Duffy (VC) (1889–1969), Irish recipient of the Victoria Cross
- James Duffy, a character in the short story "A Painful Case" (part of the book Dubliners) by James Joyce
- James Albert Duffy (died 1968), first bishop for the Diocese of Grand Island
- James P. B. Duffy (1878–1969), U.S. congressman from New York
- Jim Duffy (journalist) (born 1966), Irish historian and political commentator
- Jim Duffy (animator) (1937–2012), American animator
- Jim Duffey (1950–2019), Virginia secretary of technology
- Jamie Duffy (American musician)
- Jamie Duffy (Irish musician)
