= William Duffy =

William Duffy, Bill Duffy or Billy Duffy may refer to:

- Bill Duffy (basketball), American basketball player and player agent
- Bill Duffy (sportsman) (1866–1959), Australian sportsman
- Billy Duffy (born 1961), English musician
- Billy Duffy (hurler) (1931–2005), Irish hurler
- William Duffy, a pseudonym of William Dufris (1958–2020), an American voice actor
- William Duffy (bishop), English Roman Catholic bishop
- William Duffy (politician) (1865–1945), Irish nationalist politician
- William James Duffy (1888–1946), Canadian politician
- William J. Duffy (1916–2013), American jurist and legislator
