= Duhigg =

Duhigg is a surname, a variant of Duffy. Notable people with the surname include:

- Bartholomew Thomas Duhigg (1750?–1813), Irish legal antiquary
- Charles Duhigg (born 1974), American journalist and non-fiction author
- Katy Duhigg, American attorney and politician

== See also ==
- Duhig, another surname
