= Martin Duffy (disambiguation) =

Martin Duffy (1967–2022) was an English musician.

Martin Duffy or Marty Duffy may also refer to:

- Martin Duffy (filmmaker) (born 1952), Irish filmmaker and writer
- Marty Duffy, Irish Gaelic football referee
