= Mark Duffy (banker) =

Irish banker

Mark Duffy is an Irish banker.

In 1981 he joined ICC Bank as a graduate trainee before taking up a position at 3i, a venture capital company. When 3i was sold to Anglo Irish Bank in 1987, he was offered a role with the new owner. He was approached by Bank of Scotland, who owned part of 3i at the time, to become CEO aged 31 to rescue their ailing Equity Bank in 1992. He successfully grew this entity, acquiring his previous employer ICC along the way, into a €37bn full service bank challenging the Irish banks for the first time. He led the bank's rollout of a retail branch network from 2006, with branches predominantly in stores purchased from the ESB.

After 17 years as CEO, Duffy resigned from his role as CEO of Bank of Scotland (Ireland) in March 2008 at the age of 51, remaining with the bank in another role until early 2009; he cited a personal desire to take some leave and do something else. He was replaced by his former COO Joe Higgins.

Bank of Scotland (Ireland) suffered substantial credit losses in the years after Duffy's departure, announcing the closure of its retail branch network, by then branded Halifax, in February 2010, followed six months later by parent Lloyds Banking Group deciding to pull out of Ireland entirely. Although the Irish state established a banking inquiry some years later, Duffy was not invited to give evidence. An investigation into the collapse of HBOS plc by UK regulators led to no action being taken against Duffy or others.

He has also been associated with a range of new startup companies, including Loanbox, and Duffy Analytics. He was also rumoured in June 2018 to be "eyeing up an the Irish residential lending market" potentially as a repeat of his work with Bank of Scotland (Ireland). Duffy was also connected with a "lease-to-loan financing" startup company in 2023.
