= Riff Raff =

Riff Raff, Riffraff or Riff-Raff may refer to:

== Music ==
- Riff Raff (rapper) (Horst Christian Simco; born 1982), from Texas, US
- Riff Raff (band), a UK progressive rock band
- Riff Raff, a band formed by Billy Bragg
- Riff Raff (album), by Dave Edmunds
- "Riff Raff", an organ piece by Giles Swayne
- "Riff Raff", a song on the album Powerage by AC/DC

== Films ==
- Riffraff (1936 film), an American drama starring Jean Harlow and Spencer Tracy
- Riffraff (1947 film), a black-and-white film noir featuring Pat O'Brien
- Riff-Raff (1991 film), a British film
- Riff Raff (2024 film), an American crime thriller film
- Riff Raff, a Laurence Fishburne play from which the 2000 film Once in the Life was adapted

== Fictional characters ==
- Riff Raff (cat), an alley cat in the animated series The Catillac Cats
- Riff Raff (hunchback), in the musical play The Rocky Horror Show and film The Rocky Horror Picture Show
- Riff Raff (Underdog), on the television series Underdog

== Other uses ==
- Common people (derogatory "riffraff")
- Riff Raff (British magazine), a former London-based monthly rock magazine

== See also ==
- Riff (disambiguation)
