= Mik Duffy =

Northern Irish writer and director

- Subject: film
- Notable works: Flying Saucer Rock'n'Roll

Mik Duffy is a filmmaker and writer from Armagh, Northern Ireland. Currently residing in Belfast, he writes mainly for and about film.

== Filmography ==
- Igloo (2013)
- Hopper (2010)
- Brody Mullet: Boxkicker (2006)
- Hitch (2005/II)
- Mortice (1999)
- Flying Saucer Rock'n'Roll (1997)
- The Eliminator (1996)
- Necromentary (1995)
- Night of the Living Middle Income Bracket (1992)
