= George Frederick Duffey =

Irish physician

Sir George Frederick Duffey (20 June 1843 – 13 October 1903) was president of the Royal College of Physicians of Ireland.

He received his medical degree from Trinity College in 1864, and entered the Army Medical Department in the same year. He was stationed in Malta, and wrote about instances of rheumatic orchitis which he observed there.

He was a founding member of the Dublin Biological Club. He was an editor of the Irish Hospital Gazette, which he founded, and the Dublin Journal of Medical Science.

He was knighted in 1897.

== Arms ==
Coat of arms of George Frederick Duffey
Notes Confirmed by Sir Arthur Edward Vicars, Ulster King of Arms, 12 February 1898. Crest On a wreath of the colours a tower Proper thereon a banner of the arms displayed. Escutcheon Per pale nebulee Gules and Sable a lion rampant holding in the dexter paw a Seywetan all Or. Motto Deo Patriae Amicis
