= Doey =

Doey may refer to:

- Richard Doey (born 1956), Canadian rower
- Shona Doey Seawright (born 1977, Irish cricketer
- Jennifer "Doey" Walinga (born 1965), Canadian rower
- Doey the Doughman, a character from Poppy Playtime
