= Gabriel Duffy =

Irish author and philosopher

- Born: 1942; Dublin, Ireland
- Died: 2008 (aged 65–66)
- Occupation: Philosopher

Gabriel Patrick Duffy (1942–2008) was an author and philosopher born in Dublin, Ireland, and is best known for his autobiography, Sham to Rock. Duffy emigrated to London in 1963, where he worked as an accountant. He then worked in recruitment, subsequently establishing and building up Gabriel Duffy, which in the 1980s became a well-known and successful financial recruitment consultancy. When, as a result of the recession in the early 1990s, the business hit difficulties, he turned full-time to his great love, writing. He has two daughters and was friendly with the novelist Colin Wilson. Duffy died of peritonitis in his Brighton flat in early December, 2008.

== Sham to Rock "Growing Up in Forties and Fifties Dublin" ==
Sham to Rock was first published in 2003 by Aengus books. It is an autobiographical account of the first 17 years of Duffy's life, and focuses on his physical, mental and social maturation in a Catholic society. The title symbolises the movement from the sham hypocrisy of the immediate post-war years to a more open and cosmopolitan approach to life: rock. The book was well received in the media, with the Sunday Independent describing it as "lively and evocative, as well as beautifully and economically written" while The Irish World stated that "his observations [...] will keep you riveted right through to the very last page". However, the sales of Sham to Rock were lower than expected and, given this, there were no further editions. A sequel to Sham to Rock has been drafted, but not yet published.
