= Marion Davison Duffie =

American singer and voice teacher

- Born: May 24, 1896; Erie, Pennsylvania, U.S.
- Died: August 4, 1965 (aged 69); Harwich, Massachusetts, U.S.
- Education: New England Conservatory of Music
- Occupations: singer teacher
- Spouse: Harold R. Duffie
- Children: 3 (including Ann Davison Duffie Fleck)

Marion Davison Duffie (May 24, 1896 – August 4, 1965) was an American singer and voice teacher.

== Early life and education ==
Duffie was born on May 24, 1896 in Erie, Pennsylvania. She descended from an old, prominent family in Philadelphia.

She lived in Albany, New York before attending the New England Conservatory of Music in Boston. She studied singing under Charles Bennet and was a member of the school's photograph committee. She graduated from the conservatory in 1917 with diplomas in vocal soloists' courses and vocal teachers' courses.

== Career and continued training ==
Following her graduation from conservatory, she spent a year and a half entertaining soldiers and sailors at Camp Wadsworth, Camp Dix, Camp Devens, and Camp Upton to boost morale during World War I.

In the spring 1918, she returned Boston and performed Cesar Franck's "La Procession" with the New England Conservatory Orchestra under the direction of Wallace Goodrich. In May 1918, she performed as a soloist in Boston with Charles Bennett as an accompanist. She continued studying under Bennett for two additional semesters in 1919 and from 1924 to 1925.

In 1926, she took a course in public school music with Grace Pierce. In 1932, she studied voice under William Whitney.

She served as head of the voice department at two prestigious girls' schools.

== Personal life and death ==
Duffie was a member of the Daughters of the American Revolution (DAR) and served as regent of the Mary Draper Chapter in Massachusetts.'

She was the mother of music director Ann Davison Duffie Fleck, who also served as the 33rd DAR President General.

In 1932, she lived in West Roxbury. By 1958, she was living in Harwich Port, Massachusetts.

She died on August 4, 1965.
