= Motešice =

- Municipality
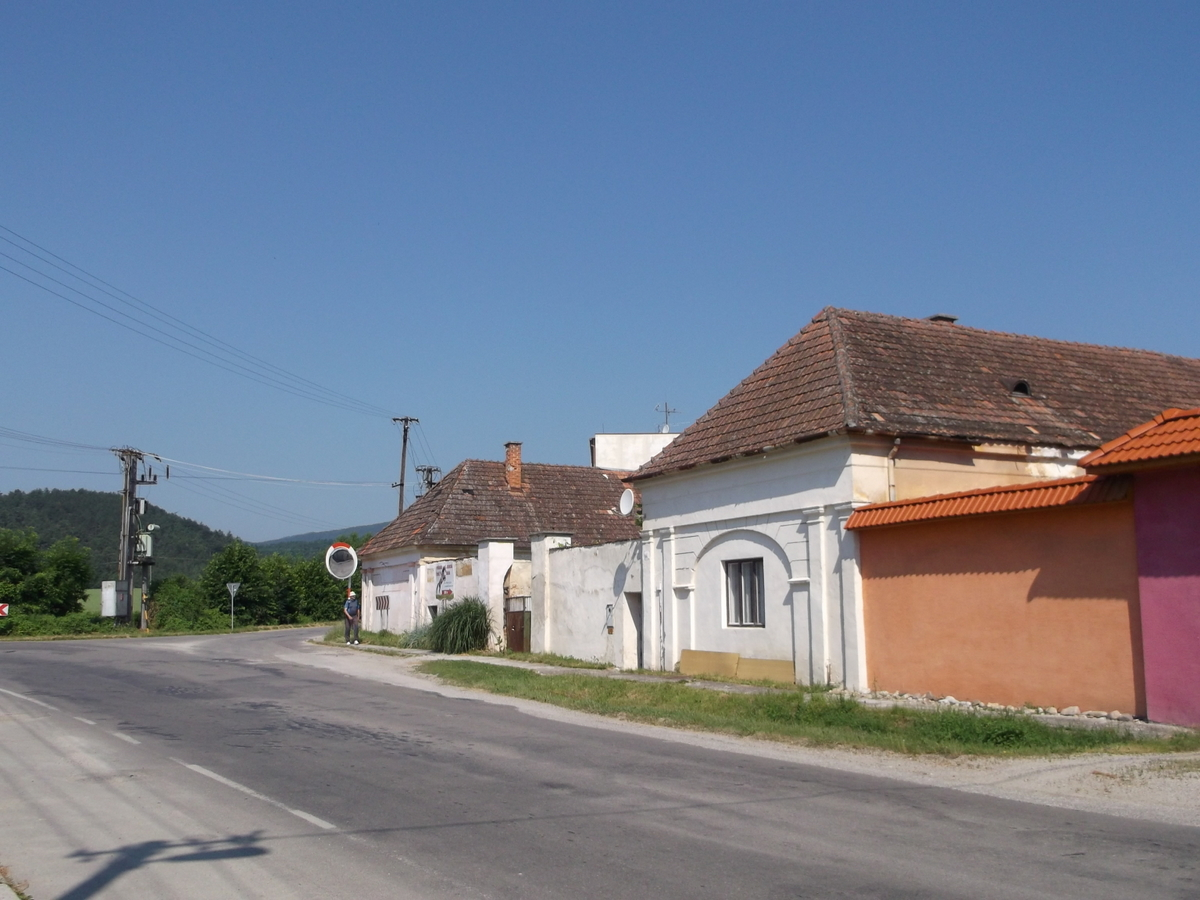

- Flag

- Location of Motešice in the Trenčín Region Location of Motešice in Slovakia
- Coordinates: 48.83°N 18.19°E
- Country: Slovakia
- Region: Trenčín Region
- District: Trenčín District
- First mentioned: 1308

Area
  - Total: 17.39 km^{2} (6.71 sq mi)
- Elevation: 291 m (955 ft)

Population (2025)
  - Total: 781
- Time zone: UTC+1 (CET)
  - Summer (DST): UTC+2 (CEST)
- Postal code: 913 26
- Area code: +421 32
- Vehicle registration plate (until 2022): TN
- Website: www.motesice.sk

Motešice (Hungarian: Motesic) is a village and municipality in Trenčín District in the Trenčín Region of north-western Slovakia.

== History ==
In historical records the village was first mentioned in 1208.

== Geography ==
The municipality lies at an altitude of 291 metres (955 ft) and covers an area of 17.39 km^{2} (6.71 sq mi) (2025).

== Population ==
Population statistic (10 years)
Year	1995	2005	2015	2025
Count	800	809	801	781
Difference		+1.12%	−0.98%	−2.49%

Population statistic
Year	2024	2025
Count	779	781
Difference		+0.25%

It has a population of 781 people (31 December 2025).

=== Ethnicity ===
Census 2021 (1+ %)
Ethnicity	Number	Fraction
Slovak	770	98.46%
Czech	9	1.15%
Total	782	

In year 2021 was 782 people by ethnicity 770 as Slovak, 9 as Czech, 7 as Other, 6 as Not found out, 3 as German, 2 as Serbian, 1 as Jewish, 1 as Ukrainian, 1 as Russian, 1 as Austrian, 1 as Polish, 1 as Canadian, 1 as English and 1 as Albanian.

Note on population: The difference values of population numbers in the table "Population statistic" and in the sections "Ethnicity" & "Religion" is caused by the use of various statistical methods.

=== Religion ===
Census 2021 (1+ %)
Religion	Number	Fraction
Roman Catholic Church	619	79.16%
None	134	17.14%
Evangelical Church	14	1.79%
Total	782	

In year 2021 was 782 people by religion 619 from Roman Catholic Church, 134 from None, 14 from Evangelical Church, 3 from Not found out, 3 from Greek Catholic Church, 2 from Eastern Orthodox Church, 2 from Christian Congregations in Slovakia, 1 from Jewish community, 1 from Other and not ascertained christian church, 1 from Buddhism, 1 from Apostolic Church and 1 from Ad hoc movements.
