= Meghan Duffy =

American biologist

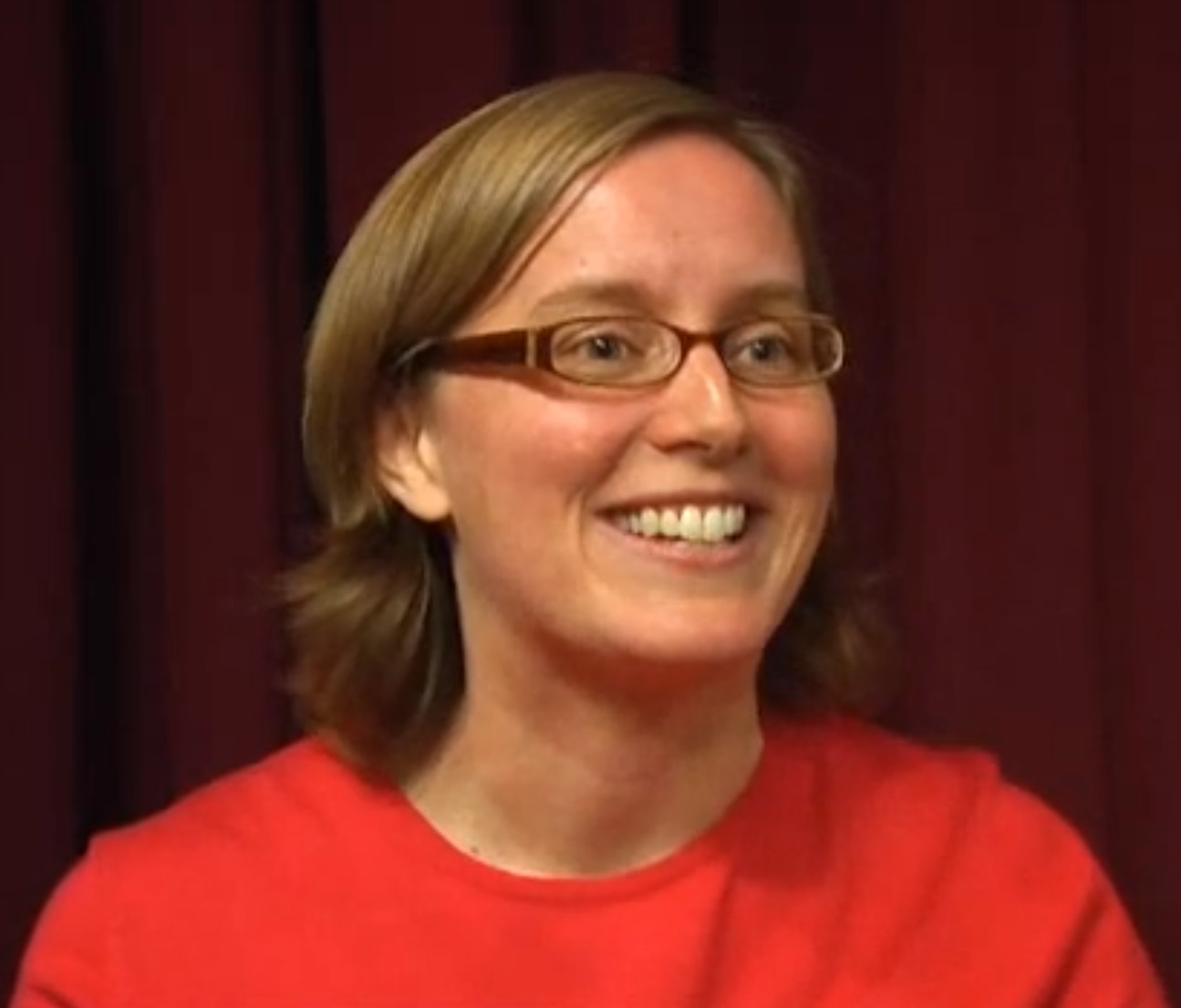
- Duffy on receiving her 2011 Presidential Early Career Award for Scientists and Engineers
- Born: Meghan Anne Duffy
- Education: Michigan State University; Cornell University
- Awards: Presidential Early Career Award for Scientists and Engineers (2012)
- Scientific career
- Fields: Ecology; Evolutionary biology; Disease ecology
- Workplaces: University of Michigan; Georgia Tech; University of Wisconsin–Madison
- Thesis: Evolutionary and community ecology of parasitism in Daphnia (2006)
- Doctoral advisor: Alan Tessier; Jeff Conner
- Website: duffylab.wordpress.com

Meghan Anne Duffy is an American biologist and the Susan S. Kilham Collegiate Professor of Ecology and Evolutionary Biology at the University of Michigan. She focuses on the causes and consequences of parasitism in natural populations of lake populations. In 2019, she created a task force to examine factors that influence the mental health and well-being of graduate students at the University of Michigan.

== Education ==
Duffy earned a Bachelors Biological Sciences from Cornell University in 2000. She completed her graduate studies at Kellogg Biological Station and Michigan State University. In 2006, she was awarded a PhD in Zoology and from the Ecology, Evolution, and Behavior (EEB) Program.

== Career and research ==
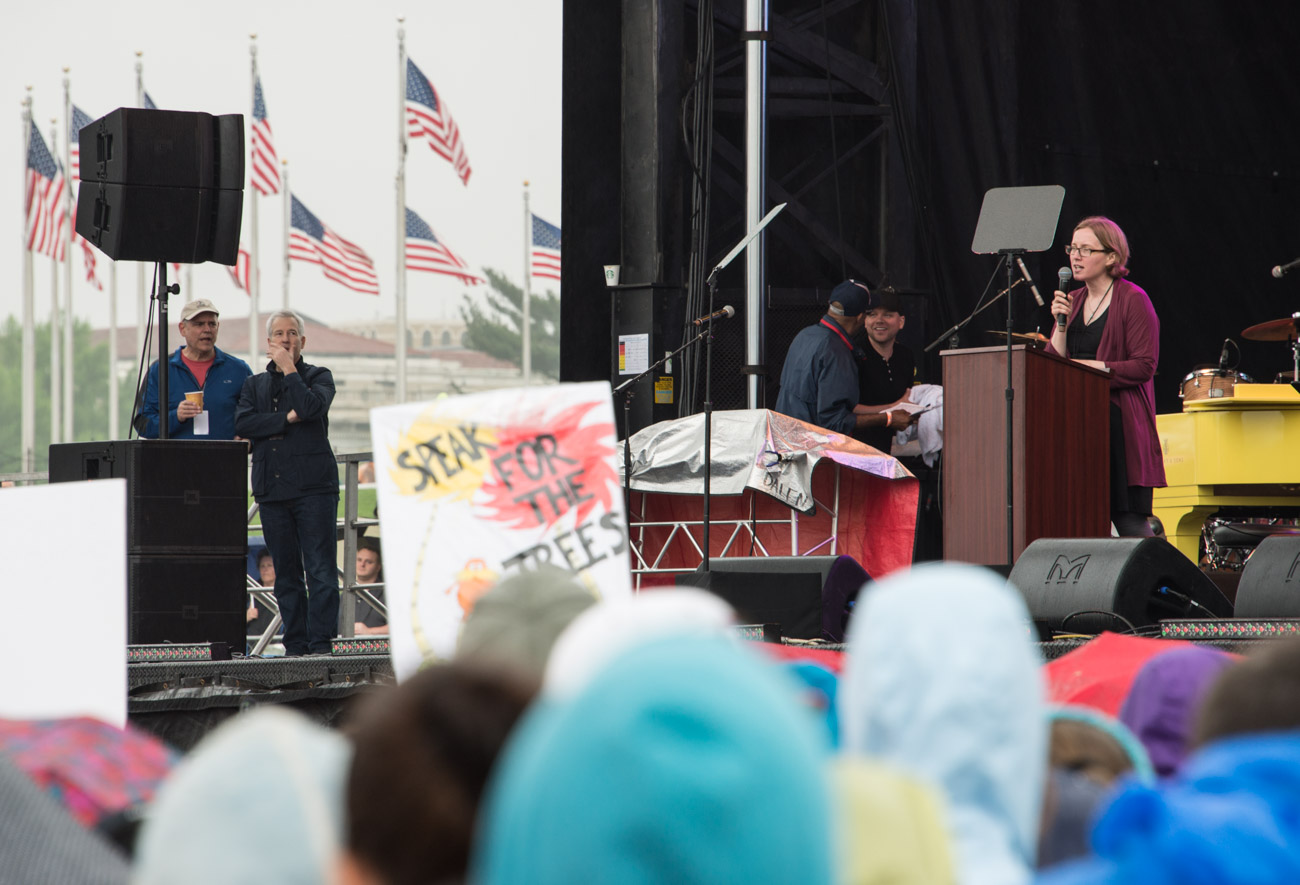
Duffy speaking at the 2017 March for Science event in Washington, DC

In 2006, she was appointed an National Science Foundation (NSF) postdoctoral research fellow at the University of Wisconsin. In 2008 she joined Georgia Tech as an assistant professor. She worked on the parasites that feed on small freshwater crustaceans (Daphnia), using them as a "model system for understanding host-parasite interactions in general". She found that ecological context was important when gauging epidemic size, and that when some parasites are "battling an epidemic of a deadly parasite, less resistance can sometimes be better than more". In 2012 she won the Presidential Early Career Award for Scientists and Engineers, which was presented to her by Barack Obama.

Duffy joined University of Michigan in 2012. Her research concentrates on rapid evolutionary responses in novel host-parasite associations. She is currently researching the influences of food webs and eco-evolutionary dynamics on host-parasite interactions and multi-host, multi-parasite interactions. Duffy is concerned about cuts to basic research funding.

=== Public engagement ===
Duffy established the Ecology and Evolutionary Biology (EEB) Mentor Match, which pairs undergraduate students from minority-serving institutions with mentors to help with graduate school and fellowship applications. Duffy created Diversity EEB, a list of ecologists / evolutionary biologists who are women or from a group traditionally underrepresented in the sciences to help people identify scientists who might diversify seminar series or for award nominations. Duffy is one of the 2017/2018 American Association for the Advancement of Science Leshner Leadership Institute Public Engagement Fellows. She is interested in how scientists can engage with policy makers. She delivered the opening address at the 2017 March for Science. In 2017, Duffy ran a workshop for high school students on the University of Michigan Wolverine Pathways program, teaching students how to find and use open data to answer questions that they are interested in. She is one of three contributors to the science blog Dynamic Ecology.

In October 2017, Duffy won the University of Michigan President's Award for Public Impact, for being "a leading national voice in promoting the crucial importance of diversity, equity and inclusion in the STEM disciplines". She won the 2010 George Mercer Award from the Ecological Society of America, and the 2017 Yentsch-Schindler Early Career Award from the Association for the Sciences of Limnology and Oceanography.

She was elected a Fellow of the American Association for the Advancement of Science in 2019 and of the Ecological Society of America in 2023.
