= Big Chimneys =

Coordinates: 38°52′56.56″N 77°10′29.34″W

Big Chimneys Park is located in Falls Church, Virginia. It marks the site of a log house built in 1699. It is located on Annandale Road about a block west of Maple Avenue. It is currently under renovation from which is said to last from December 2019 to Summer of 2020.

== History ==
Big Chimneys is considered to have been the start of the city of Falls Church as it was the first permanent structure built in the modern day borders. An inscription on a historical marker, placed by the City of Falls Church, reads:

Large log house named for its two huge chimneys. One datestone was inscribed 1699, the traditional date quoted for the community's founding. First recorded owner of site is Henry Gunnell (1773 22.75 acre grant). James Gordon, owner 1803-1836, had license for an inn. Thompsons owned cabin from 1845-1868 and Lynchs from 1868, until it was torn down about 1908. At that time cabin was about 25x55 feet with 3 chimneys, 4 rooms on ground floor and 3 rooms above. Foundation stones were dug up in 1972 at a site believed located near the intersection of the tobacco rolling roads in the 1700s.
