= David Duffy (banker) =

Irish banker (born 1961)

- Born: 30 September 1961 (age 65); Hammersmith, London, England
- Education: Terenure College; Trinity College Dublin
- Occupation: Banker
- Title: CEO, Virgin Money UK
- Term: June 2015–October 2024
- Successor: Chris Rhodes
- Spouse: Carolyn
- Children: 3

David Joseph Duffy (born 30 September 1961) is an Irish banker, and a former chief executive officer (CEO) of Virgin Money UK.

== Early life ==
Duffy was born in Hammersmith Hospital in London and moved to Ireland at the age of two. After his parents split up he was raised in Terenure, south Dublin, by his father's sister and her husband, and at the age of 16 changed his surname by deed poll from Madden to avoid confusion. He attended Terenure College in Dublin from 1972 to 1980, followed by Trinity College Dublin where he earned a bachelor's degree in business in 1984, and then a master's degree. Duffy was the first person in his family to go to University.

== Career ==
Duffy began his career with management consulting firm, Craig Gardner, in Dublin in 1984, and has held various management roles, including global head and board positions at Goldman Sachs and ING Barings.

In 2006, Duffy joined Standard Bank as its CEO, and the following year was appointed CEO of Standard Bank International. He was responsible for corporate and investment banking activities, in addition to overseas retail business units. The role covered Asia, Latin America, the UK and Europe. He relocated to Singapore in 2010 where he was also head of strategic projects for Standard Bank.

Returning to Ireland in 2011, Duffy was appointed CEO of Allied Irish Banks (AIB Group plc), one of the largest retail and commercial banks in Ireland. Duffy was pivotal in the turnaround of AIB, returning it to a profit making institution after its bail-out by the Irish government.

Duffy joined Clydesdale Bank in June 2015 as CEO. In February 2016 he led the demerger and IPO of Clydesdale Bank from National Australia Bank, recreating an independent banking group, CYBG plc.

In July 2017, Duffy became a member of the board of UK Finance, a trade body representing over 300 firms in the UK providing banking, credit, markets and payment-related services.

In March 2018, as part of the Chancellor's financial technology (FinTech) strategy, HM Treasury appointed Duffy as FinTech envoy for the regions in England.

On 15 October 2018, CYBG acquired Virgin Money UK for £1.7 billion. This was one of the first major deals in the banking sector since the 2008 financial crash. David remained CEO of the combined CYBG, which was renamed Virgin Money UK plc on 30 October 2019.

On 1 October 2024, as part of Nationwide Building Society's acquisition of Virgin Money UK plc, Duffy stepped down as its CEO and was replaced by Chris Rhodes, Nationwide's former Chief Financial Officer.

== Personal life ==
Duffy is married and has two daughters and a son. His wife is Carolyn, and they have residences in Cork, Dublin and London. Duffy is a keen sportsman and enjoys running, playing tennis and sailing.
