= Romney Duffey =

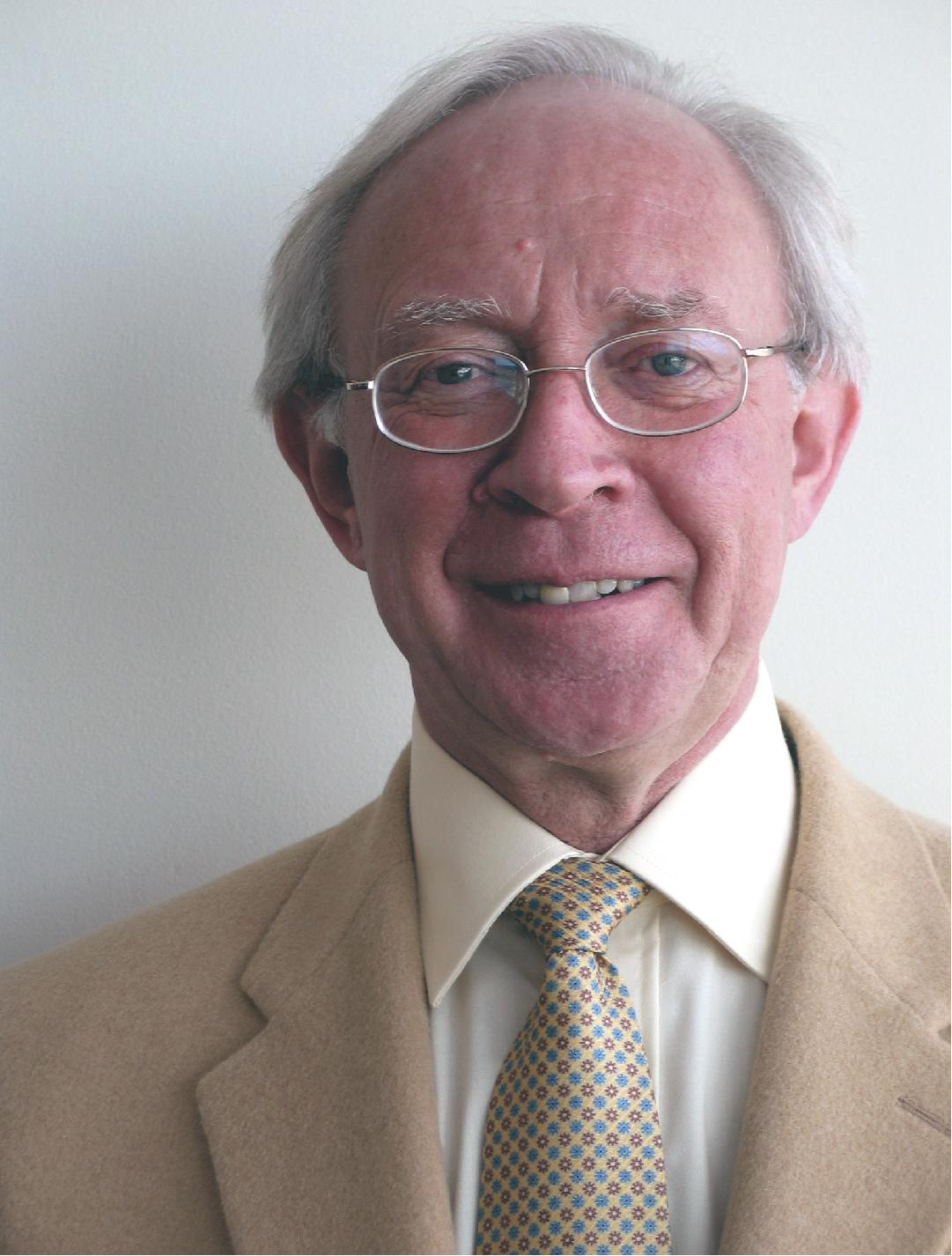
R.B.Duffey

Romney Beecher Duffey (born 1942, New Romney, Kent, England) is an American nuclear scientist. Duffey has worked on modern energy systems, in the areas of thermohydraulics, system design, system analysis, risk assessment, human factors, and technological safety in Britain, United States and Canada for about 40 years, and authored numerous publications, including several books.

Duffey is an ASME Fellow, former Chair of ASME Nuclear Engineering Division, former Chair of American Nuclear Society Thermal-Hydraulics Division, the Chief Scientist of Atomic Energy of Canada Limited, member of New York Academy of Sciences, member of American, Canadian and British Nuclear Associations. He served as advisor or program reviewer for numerous organizations, including NASA Ames, International Atomic Energy Agency, Natural Resources Canada, European Union, Generation IV International Forum, General Electric Corporation, Columbia University, StonyBrook University.
