= Ron Duffy =

New Zealand international rugby league footballer

Personal information
- Full name: Ronald Harold George
- Born: 1 September 1937 (age 88); Auckland, New Zealand

Playing information
Representative
Years	Team	Pld	T	G	FG	P
1961	New Zealand	2

Ron Duffy (born Ronald Harold George) is a New Zealand former professional rugby league footballer. He represented New Zealand, playing for "the Kiwis" in 1961 in two international tests.

== Early life ==
Duffy spent his childhood in Auckland. He was educated at St Peter's College.

== League career ==
Duffy was selected for the Kiwis for the 1961 tour of Britain and France as a second-row. He played in two tests, one against Great Britain and one against France.
