= Dufficy =

Dufficy is a surname. Notable people with the surname include:

- Frank Dufficy (born 1953), British diver
- John Dufficy (1901–1969), Australian politician
