= 1976 state visit by Elizabeth II to the United States =

State visit by Elizabeth II to the United States
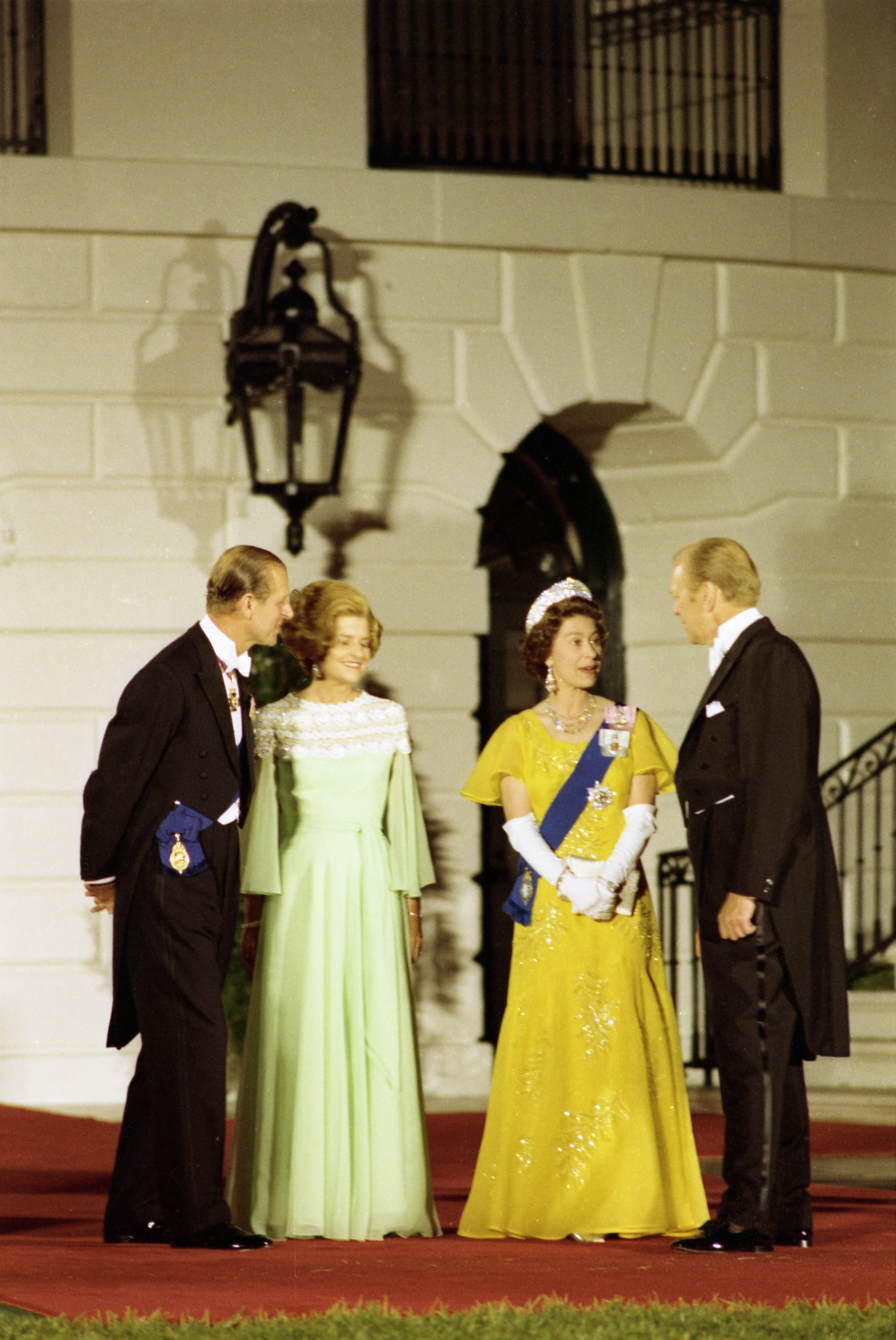
- Date: 6 to 11 July 1976
- Location: Philadelphia, Washington, D.C., New York City, New Haven, Charlottesville, Providence, Boston
- Type: State visit
- Participants: Queen Elizabeth II; Prince Philip, Duke of Edinburgh

From 6 to 11 July 1976, Queen Elizabeth II made a state visit to the United States with her husband, Prince Philip, Duke of Edinburgh, during the celebration of the bicentennial of the American independence. She was received by President Gerald Ford on 7 July 1976. The visit marked the second time she undertook a state visit to the United States as monarch.

== Schedule ==
Queen Elizabeth II and Prince Philip, Duke of Edinburgh, arrived in Philadelphia on 6 July 1976 and after carrying out some engagements spent the night abroad the royal yacht HMY Britannia. The arrival ceremony took place on 7 July, after which the Queen presented President Ford with "a soup tureen that featured a painted image of the White House and Independence Hall" which later went on display at the Smithsonian Institution. The President and the First Lady in return presented the Queen and the Duke of Edinburgh with a bronze statue by Harry Jackson depicting cowboy Calyton Danks astride the horse Steamboat. The state banquet was held in the Rose Garden in a tent. At the request of the Queen, Bob Hope and Telly Savalas were invited for the entertainment portion of the banquet in the East Room. First Lady Betty Ford described the Queen as "easy to deal with. She was very definite about what she wanted and what she didn't want." On 8 July, the Queen visited the U.S. Capitol and the Smithsonian before hosting a banquet at the British Embassy in Washington, D.C..

On 9 July, the Queen and the Duke sailed into New York Harbor abroad the royal yacht after carrying out engagements in New York City held a banquet on the royal yacht and subsequently left for New Haven, Connecticut. On 10 July they disembarked at New Haven before flying from Tweed-New Haven Airport to Charlottesville, Virginia. 50,000 people lined the docks, streets and the airport to see the couple during their brief stop in New Haven. They then departed Charlottesville for Newport, Rhode Island, and sailed overnight to Boston. On 11 July they carried out engagements in Boston before departing for Canada. Her visit to Boston was marked by a 21-gun salute, and in the North End she met with Governor Michael Dukakis before having lunch with Mayor Kevin White at City Hall. The Queen and the Duke also greeted the crowds from the balcony of the Old State House.

== Gallery ==
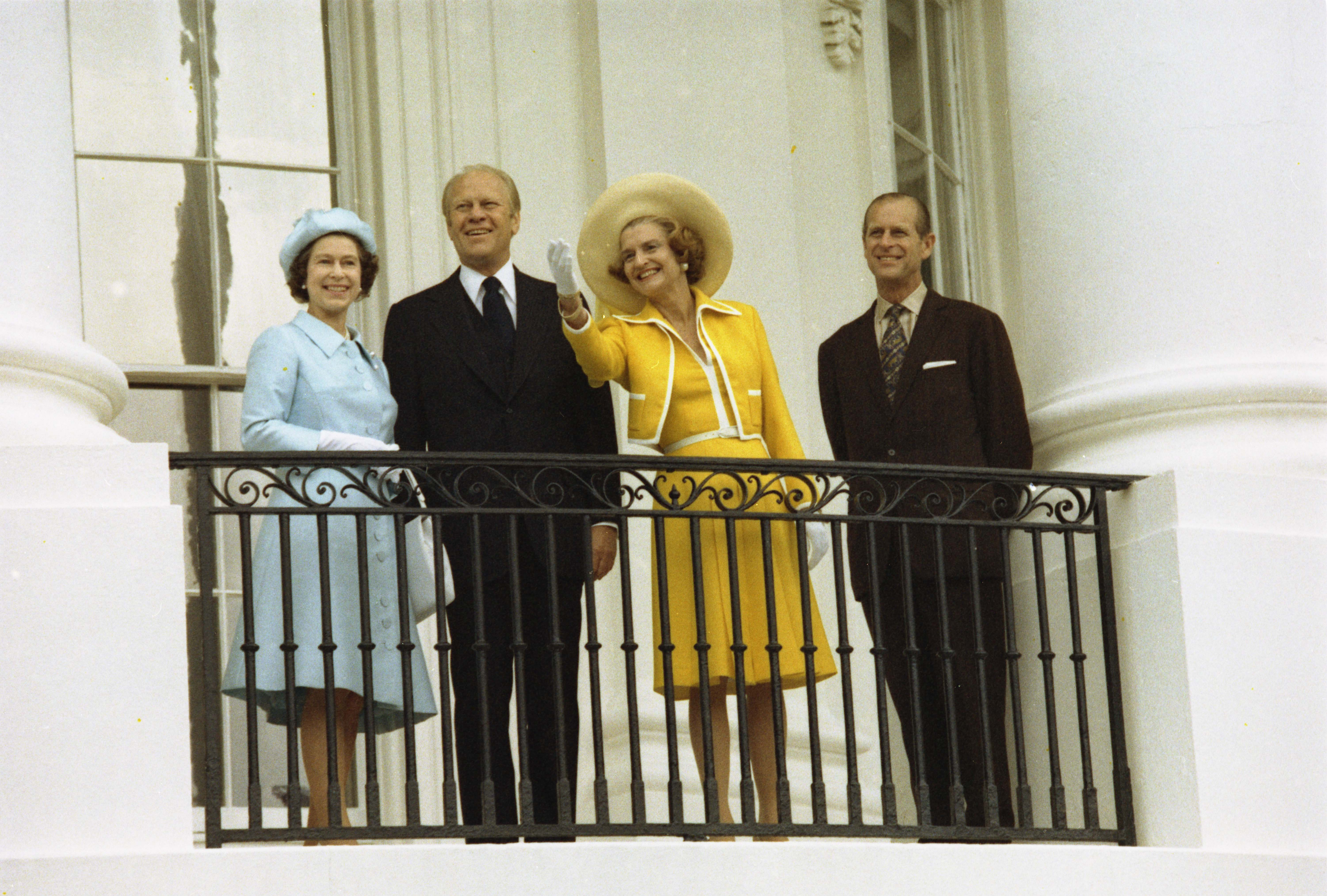
Queen Elizabeth II and Prince Philip with President Ford and First Lady Betty Ford on the Blue Room Balcony following the Queen's arrival at the White House

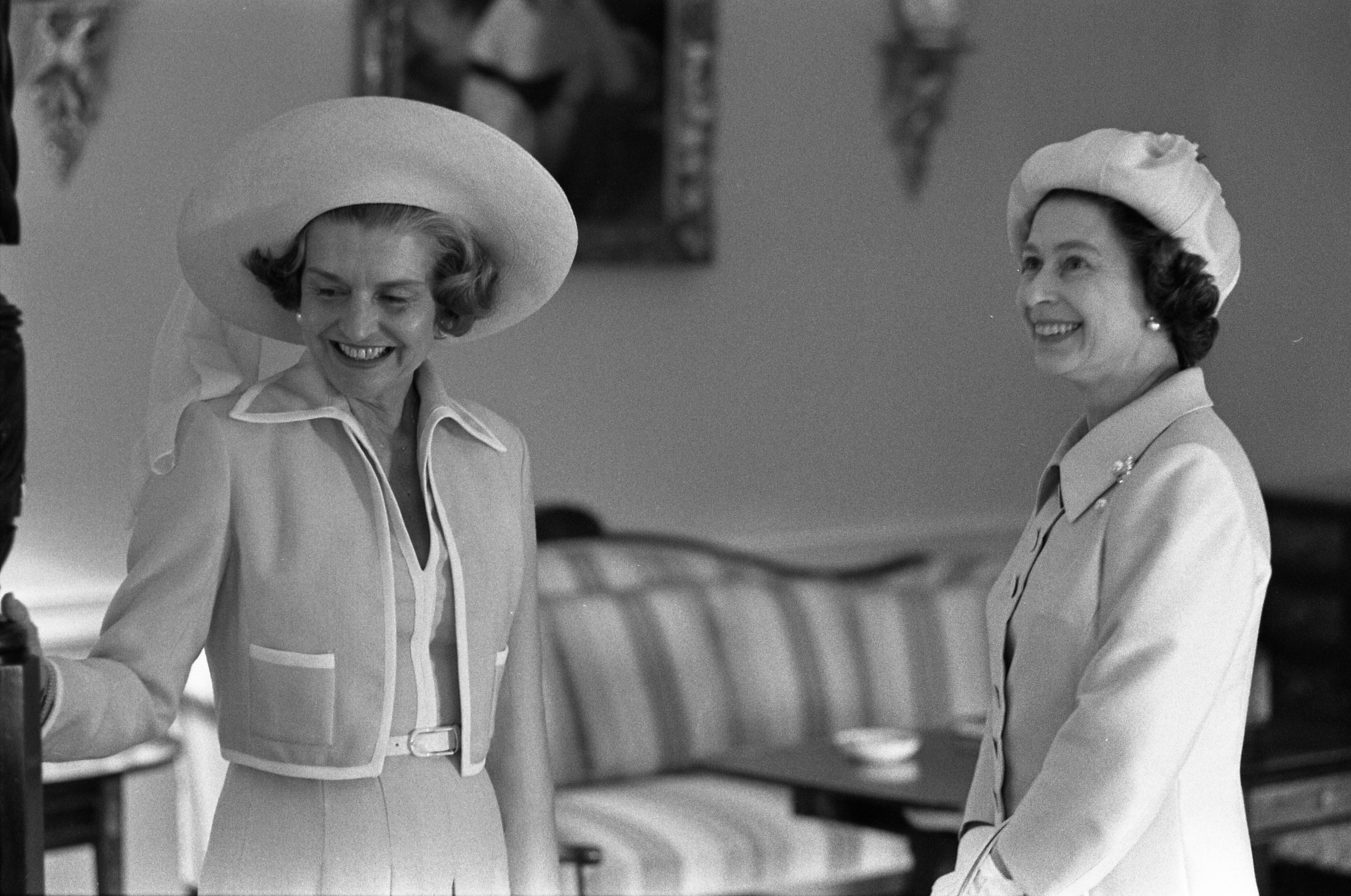
The Queen with the First Lady on a tour of the White House

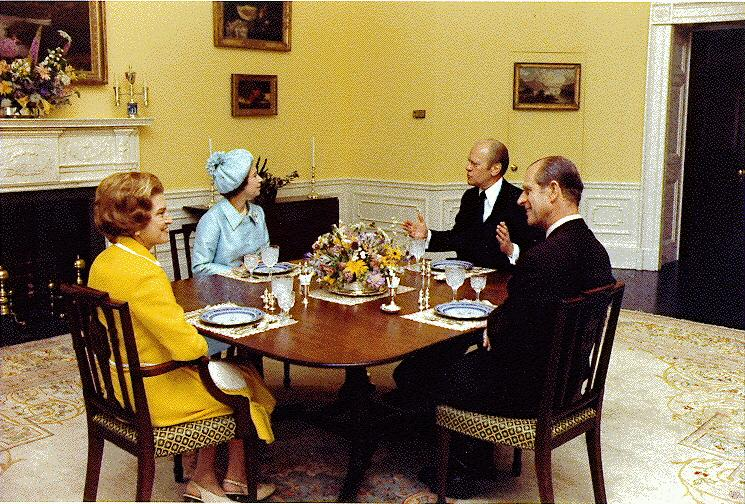
The royal couple and the presidential couple in the President's Dining Room

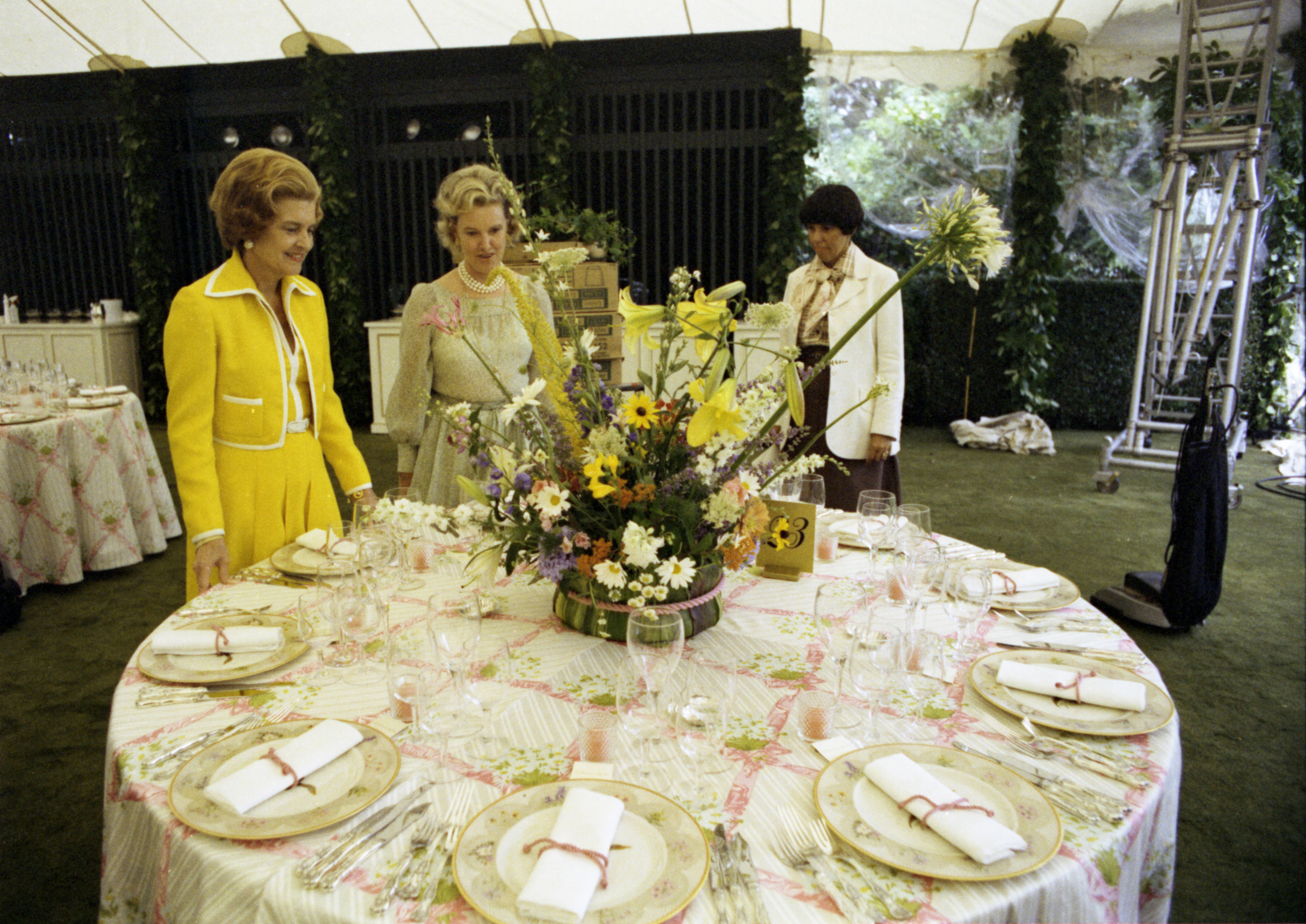
The First Lady examining tables ahead of the state banquet

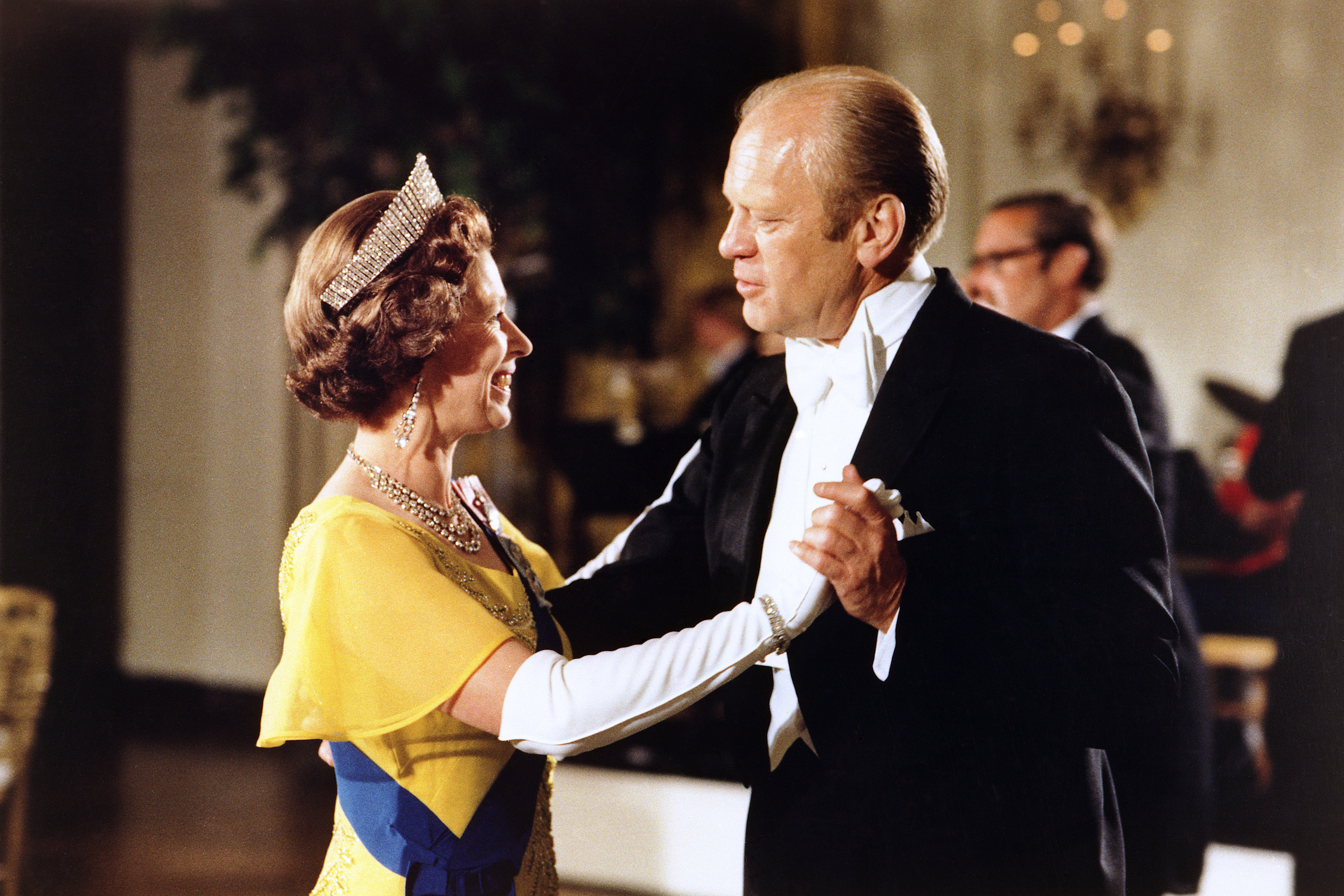
The Queen dances with President Ford during the state banquet held in her honor

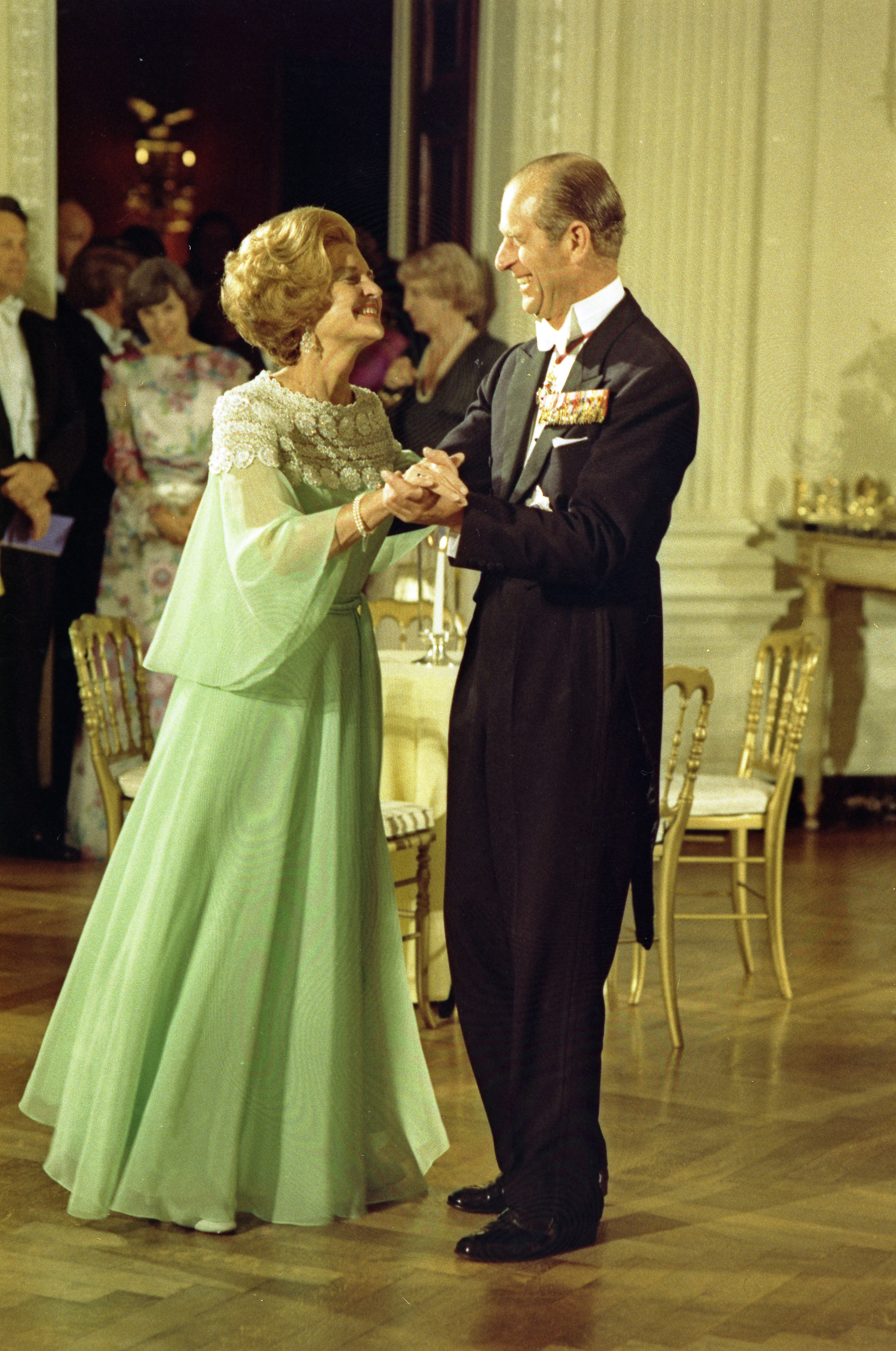
The Duke of Edinburgh and the First Lady dancing

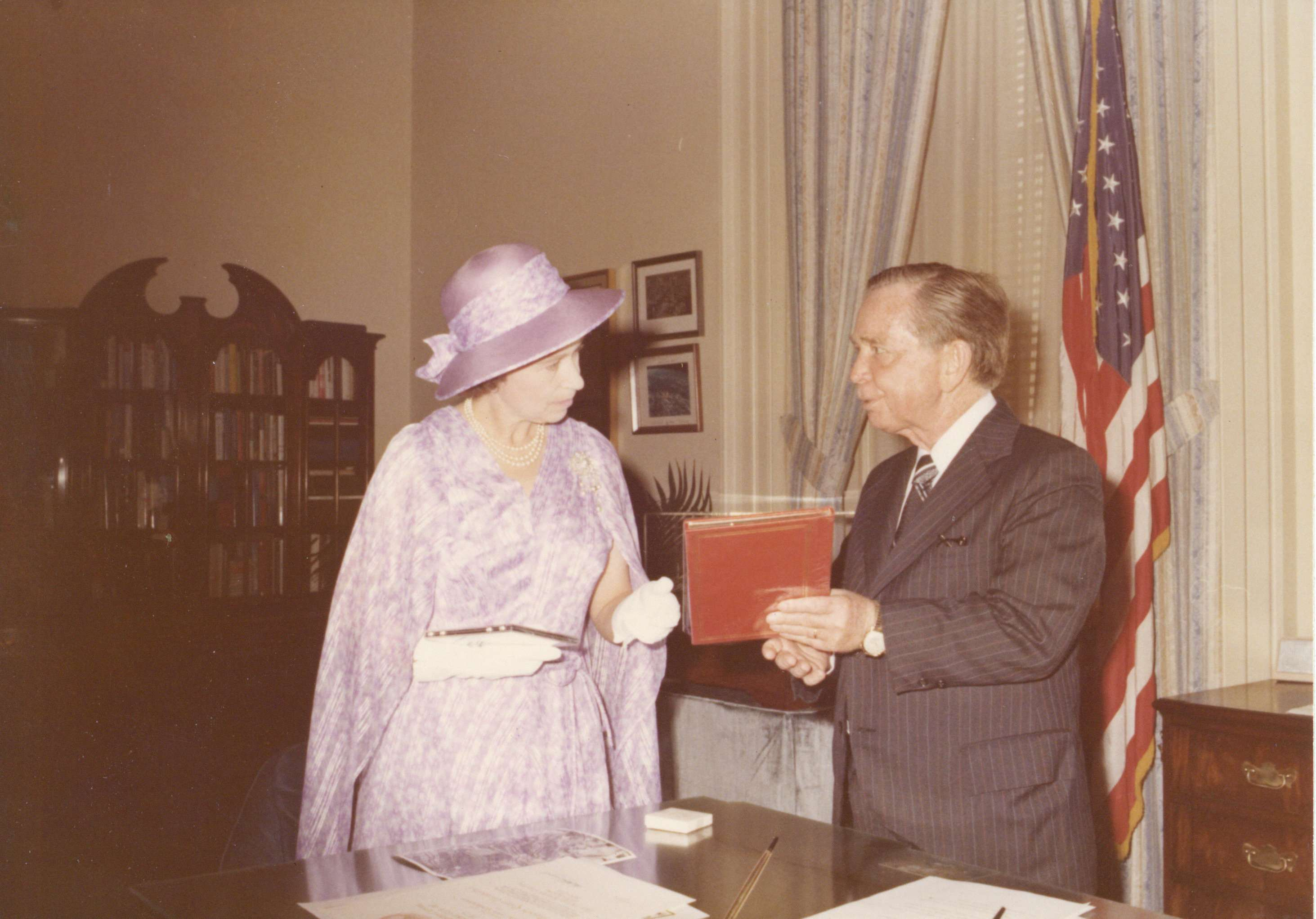
The Queen speaking with Carl Albert during her visit to the U.S. Capitol
