= Thomas J. Duffy =

Thomas J. Duffy is a designer/craftsman whose present work is the conceptualization and creation of curved doors using lasers. Duffy has also crafted one-of-a-kind cabinets, chairs, and other furniture. For many years, Duffy also made St. Lawrence River rowing skiffs. One of his furniture works is in the permanent collection of the Boston Museum of Fine Arts. He has exhibited at numerous galleries and other venues. The New York Times described him as “One of this country’s leading cabinet and chair makers..."

Curved door created by Thomas J. Duffy with laser technology (Click On Photo)

== Biography ==
Since his beginnings in the mid-1970s, Duffy’s work has evolved substantially. His early creations focused on the execution of fine cabinetry using only non-powered hand tools. He now applies laser and computer technology to the meticulous design and construction of radius entry doors. The course of Duffy’s woodworking follows the arc illuminated in “From Hand Ax to Laser” by John Purcell. Purcell’s book outlines the evolution of the use of energy through history. Duffy began in the mid-1970s in Ogdensburg, NY as a self-employed furniture maker. He originally limited himself voluntarily and exclusively to the use of hand tools and intentionally avoided power tools. Focusing on the art of fine furniture and architectural woodworking, and determined to make a living from his art and craft, he came to incorporate power tools into his work. From 2002 to the present he has been combining hand craftsmanship with laser and computer technology at his shop in Cambridge , NY (“Laser-Crafts”). He now focuses primarily on building curved doors.

== Shows and Works ==
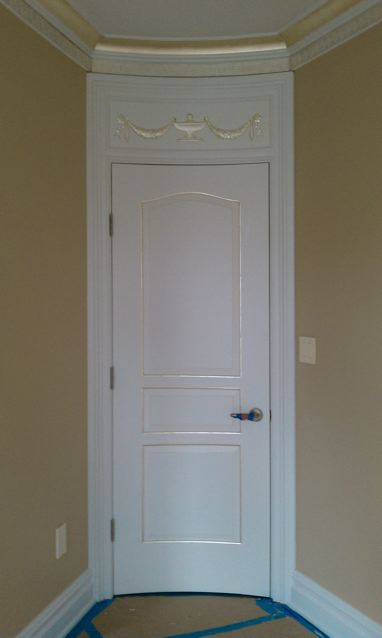
Another example of a curved door built by upstate New York designer and craftsman Thomas J. Duffy using laser technology. (Click On Photo To Enlarge)

Thomas J. Duffy’s art has appeared in exhibits in New York City, Boston, Canada, and at the Frederic Remington Art Museum in Ogdensburg, NY. “Holly Veneer and Inlay Bench” is in the permanent collection of the Boston Museum of Fine Arts’ exhibit, “American Decorative Arts.” Another work, “Wall Piece,” became part of a Christie’s benefit auction for the New York City Opera in 1990. That same year, Duffy created a featured piece for the Empire State Crafts Alliance fund-raiser. The piece, called “Chair Within a Chair,” was on display at the Heller Gallery in SOHO, New York City. During that weekend, Duffy also exhibited a folding screen at Saks Fifth Avenue. In both the chair and the screen Duffy applied the pentimento technique. He exhibited in “American Concern for Artistry and Craftsmanship,” a temporary show at the Lincoln Center for the Performing Arts in New York City in 1980. He presented “Curly Maple Chair” to the U.S. Ambassador to Canada in May 1981. The chair is now a part of the Embassy’s permanent collection in Ottawa, Ontario, Canada. In December 1979 a one-man show at the Frederic Remington Art Museum in Ogdensburg, NY, spotlighted 50 pieces by Duffy as well as numerous photographs of his work.

== Publications and appearances ==
Duffy appeared on the Public Broadcasting System’s (PBS) program, “American Woodshop,” in February 1997, when he described how he builds curved panels for his radius entry doors. He has lectured at the California College of Arts and Crafts in Oakland, CA, the Cornish College of the Arts in Seattle, WA, the Peter’s Valley Crafts School of New Jersey, and the Brookfield Craft Center in Brookfield, CT. His work has been featured in the Boston Herald Sunday Magazine, Period Homes Magazine, Fine Woodworking Magazine, and in the first three volumes of the Fine Woodworking Design Book. House Beautiful, The New York Times, and the AIA Journal have also profiled Duffy and his work.

== National Recognition ==
National recognition of Duffy’s woodworking dates back more than 20 years. Michael Varese wrote the following in The New York Times: “Thomas Duffy of Ogdensburg, N.Y., one of this country's leading cabinet and chair makers working with figured maple along traditional lines, searches for the wood using the ‘window’ method. Armed with a hatchet and a can of tree-wound paint he moves among the maples, removing 3 or 4 square inches of bark to a depth exposing the inner growths. Mr. Duffy says the telltale sign of bird's-eye maple is a swirling disordered surface, bumpy and sometimes pitted. Curly maple will reveal itself as an end view of a slice through a wave or ripple running parallel to the ground. Distinctive patterns are usually found in maples in densely wooded sites.”

== Radius Doors ==
Duffy’s current endeavor is the curved door. “Normal” flat doors continue and complete a flat plane (the wall). But a radius entry door, or any other radius or curved door, usually continues a curved wall. A curved door is best visualized as one section of a large cylinder. Radius doors must be built with extreme care in order to precisely match the curve of the walls they will be embedded in - thus the assistance of laser technology. Duffy uses a Kern CO_{2} laser to cut patterns that he either creates himself or receives from a client. With the 100 watts of power generated by the laser, he focuses on a point the size of a pinhead, allowing for intricate cuts in sometimes delicate materials, and for a degree of precision not afforded him by the use of regular power tools. Almost all varieties of wood lend themselves to laser-work. The final product may be a hinged or “swing” door, a pocket door that will slide into a wall when opened, or a door that slides along the face of a wall. Duffy has created curved doors for the Prettyman Courthouse in Washington, D.C. and for residences throughout the U.S., with commissions recently in New York, Dallas, and Los Angeles.
