= Duffy, West Virginia =

Unincorporated community in West Virginia, United States

- Unincorporated community
- Location within the state of West Virginia Duffy (the United States)
- Coordinates: 38°47′27″N 80°26′40″W
- Country: United States
- State: West Virginia
- County: Lewis
- Elevation: 1,211 ft (369 m)
- Time zone: UTC-5 (Eastern (EST))
  - Summer (DST): UTC-4 (EDT)
- GNIS ID: 1554334

Duffy is an unincorporated community in Lewis County, West Virginia, United States.

The community's name honors Dr. Duffy, a local medical doctor.
