= Denys Sutton =

Denys Miller Sutton (10 August 1917 – 30 January 1991) was a British art critic and historian known for his focus on European artists before 1800 (Old Masters) and Asian art. He was art critic for the Financial Times and editor of Apollo magazine.

== Biography ==
The son of Edmund Miller Sutton (son of Thomas Miller Sutton, a pawnbroker and jeweller, of Victoria Street, London) who worked for the family business, Suttons & Robertsons, and Dulcie Laura (nee Wheeler), Sutton was educated at Uppingham and Exeter College, Oxford, receiving a B.A. and B.Litt.

Sutton worked for the Foreign Office Research Department from 1940–46, then appointed Secretary of the International Commission for Restitution of Cultural Material. In 1948 he was named UNESCO's Fine Arts specialist. He visited Yale University in 1949 as a lecturer, then worked as art sales correspondent and a book reviewer for The Daily Telegraph, as well as art critic for the Financial Times and Country Life magazine. In 1962 the Financial Times management appointed him editor of Apollo magazine; during his years of service, he greatly improved the magazine's reputation and increased profits. On his 1986 retirement, he wrote the book 'Degas: The Man and the Work', released that year. Sutton was also a respected organiser of art exhibitions, including the 'France in the Eighteenth Century' show at the Royal Academy in 1968.

He was appointed C.B.E. in the 1985 New Year Honours list.

Sutton married Sonja Klibansky in 1940, with whom he had a daughter, Madeleine; Gertrud Koebke-Knutson in 1952, with whom he had a son, Caspar; and, in 1960, Cynthia Sassoon. Denys and Cynthia Sutton lived at Westwood Manor, a National Trust property at Bradford-upon-Avon, Wiltshire, until 1983, following which they lived at Chelsea.

== Selected works ==
- Degas: The Man and the Work (1986)
- Derain (1959) Alpha Books, Phaidon
