= Chris Duffy =

Chris Duffy may refer to:

- Chris Duffy (footballer, born 1884) (1884–1971), English footballer outside left
- Chris Duffy (footballer, born 1918) (1918–1978), Scottish footballer
- Christopher Duffy (born 1936), British military historian
- Christian Duffy (born 1961), American bodybuilder and actor
- Chris Duffy (wrestler) (1964–2000), American professional wrestler
- Chris Duffy (footballer, born 1973), English football defender
- Chris Duffy (baseball) (born 1980), American baseball player
- Christopher Duffy (baseball) (born 1987), American baseball player
- Chris Duffy, member of Waterfront (band)
- Chris Duffy, member of Bazooka Joe (band)

== See also ==
- Chris Duffey (born 1974), creative director of Adobe
