= Duhig =

Duhig is a surname. Notable people with the surname include:

- Christina Duhig, American poet
- Ian Duhig (born 1954), British poet
- James Duhig (1873–1965), Irish-born Australian Roman Catholic bishop
- James Vincent Duhig (1889–1963), Australian pathologist
- Michael Duhig (1953–2010), Canadian actor and radio host
- Tony Duhig, former guitarist of the psychedelic rock band July

== See also ==
- Duhigg, another surname
