= Dufy =

Dufy is a French surname. Notable people with the surname include:

- Jean Dufy (1888–1964), French painter
- Raoul Dufy (1877–1953), French painter

== See also ==
- Duffy (surname)
