= Jim Duffy (baseball coach) =

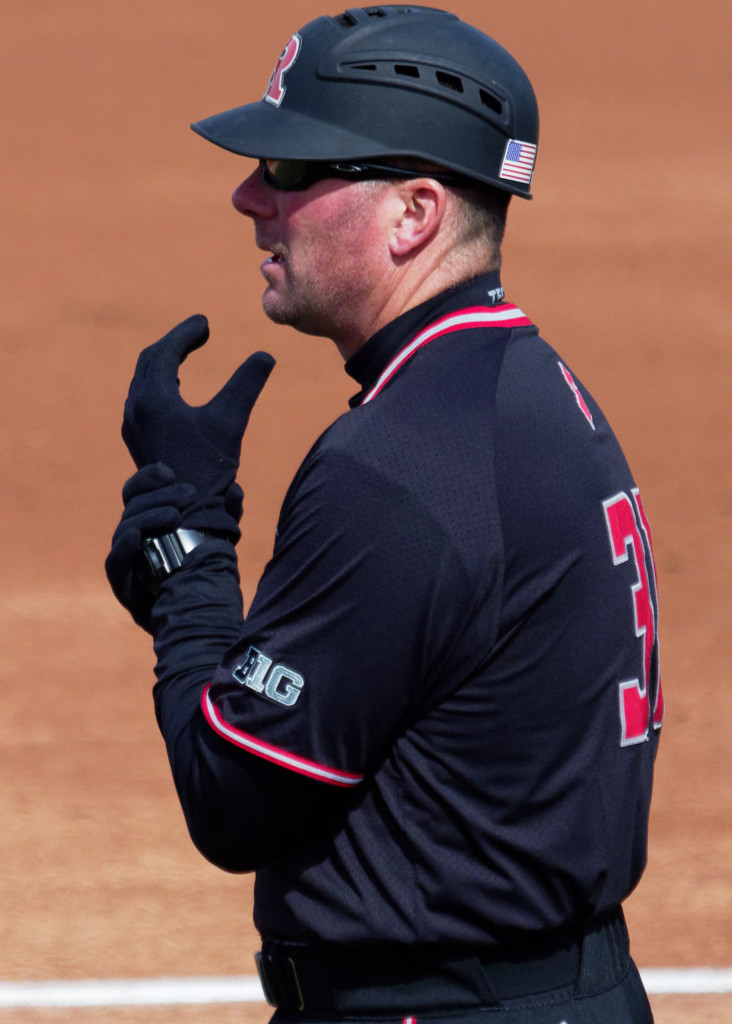
- Duffy with Rutgers in 2018

Biographical details
- Born: July 18, 1974 (age 52); Dover, New Jersey, U.S.

Playing career
- 1993–1996: Seton Hall
- Position: First baseman

Coaching career (HC unless noted)
- 2001–2008: Seton Hall (Asst.)
- 2011: Seton Hall (Asst.)
- 2012–2017: Manhattan
- 2018–2019: Rutgers (Asst.)

Head coaching record
- Overall: 132–187
- Tournaments: NCAA: 0–2; MAAC: 6–7

James Duffy (born July 18, 1974) is an American college baseball coach and former first baseman. He served as head coach of the Manhattan Jaspers baseball team from 2012 through 2017. He was named to that position prior to the 2012 season.

== Playing career ==
Duffy played first base at Seton Hall where he set several school records at the plate and earned All-Big East honors three times. In 1994, he played collegiate summer baseball with the Chatham Athletics of the Cape Cod Baseball League. He signed a professional contract with the Houston Astros in 1997. He advanced to Class-AA, playing primarily as an outfielder, but also seeing significant time at first base. He ended his playing career after the 1999 season.

== Coaching career ==
While Seton Hall head coach Mike Sheppard recovered from surgery in 2001, Duffy served as a part-time assistant coach with the Pirates. He was promoted to full-time in 2003, and served as hitting coach through the 2008 season. He returned in 2011 in the same capacity before being hired at Manhattan in the summer of 2011. In his first season, the Jaspers claimed both the Metro Atlantic Athletic Conference regular season and Tournament titles, and boasted the nation's only undefeated record at home. They earned a berth in the Columbia Regional, headlined by host South Carolina.

On July 20, 2017, Duffy left his post at Manhattan to become an assistant coach at Rutgers. In 2019, head coach Joe Litterio was replaced by Steve Owens who chose not to retain Duffy on the coaching staff.

== Head coaching record ==
This table depicts Duffy's record as a head coach at the Division I level.

Record table
Season	Team	Overall	Conference	Standing	Postseason
Manhattan Jaspers (Metro Atlantic Athletic Conference) (2012–2017)
2012	Manhattan	33–27	18–6	1st (9)	NCAA Regional
2013	Manhattan	22–27	9–12	6th (9)	
2014	Manhattan	17–33	11–14	6th (11)	MAAC tournament
2015	Manhattan	18–34	9–15	9th (11)	
2016	Manhattan	24–31	13–11	6th (11)	MAAC tournament
2017	Manhattan	18–35	12–12	5th (11)	MAAC tournament
Manhattan:		132–187	72–70		
Total:		132–187			
National champion Postseason invitational champion Conference regular season champion Conference regular season and conference tournament champion Division regular season champion Division regular season and conference tournament champion Conference tournament champion
