= Pam Raff =

Pamela Joan Raff (January 13, 1952 - November 20, 2009) was a British-American tap dancer. Raff performed, developed choreography, and taught dance mainly in the Boston area.

== Biography ==
Pamela Joan Raff was born on January 13, 1952, in Oxford. She grew up in Morristown, New Jersey. At the age of three, she started tap dance lessons and later learned ballet, modern dance, and belly dance. She briefly attended American University, but dropped out to hitchhike across the United States (US) and ended up in Boston. She worked in malls around the US as a "dancing Magoo," and when she returned to Boston, she started to study dance in 1978 with Leon Collins. Raff also worked on dance choreography.

Raff and Collins founded Collins & Company in 1982, and Raff taught and developed dance curriculum at the Leon Collins Dance Studio. She and others kept the studio running after the death of Collins in 1985. In 1994, she released the "first full-length digital recording of jazz tapping, called "Feet First" It was favorably reviewed by critic Patricia Myers, writing for JazzTimes. Raff started teaching dance in her own studio in 1995. She also performed at the Boston Center for the Arts' Black Box Theater in 1995, where Diane C. Grant wrote in the Boston Globe that her performance "belies just about every tap dance stereotype."

Raff died in her home in Upton, Massachusetts, on November 20, 2009.
