= Michael Duffy (equestrian) =

Irish showjumper

Personal information
- Full name: Michael Duffy
- Nationality: Irish
- Born: 12 October 1994 (age 31) Turloughmore, County Galway, Ireland
- Website: michaelduffysj.com

Sport
- Country: Ireland
- Sport: Show jumping
- Team: Ireland

Michael Paul Duffy (born 12 October 1994) is an Irish showjumper. Michael is currently the youngest Irish Senior Irish National Showjumping Champion. He started his career in Galway, Ireland under the training and Guidance of his father Paul Duffy, International Course builder and former International Show-jumper.

Michael rode horses for Olympic Bronze Medalist Cian O'Connor whilst on UAE Tour before moving to West Sussex to ride alongside Irish rider Shane Breen.
