= Chris Duffey =

American author and creative director

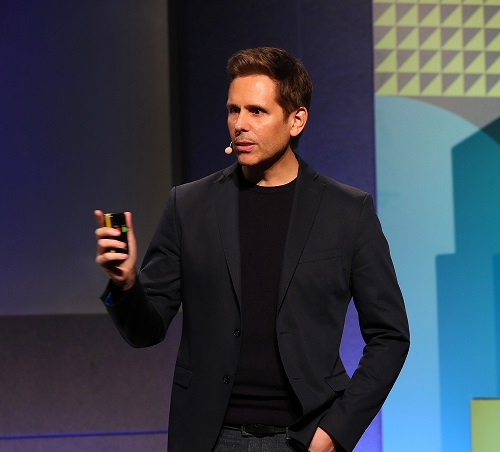
- Chris Duffey, 2019
- Born: September 3, 1974; Milwaukee, Wisconsin, US
- Education: Marquette University (B.A.); L.H.D. (honorary, 2026)
- Occupations: Technology executive, author, AI researcher
- Notable work: Superhuman Innovation (2019); Decoding the Metaverse (2023); “Admissibility Alignment” (2026
- Website: chrisduffey.ai

Chris Duffey (born September 3, 1974) is an American author and executive at Adobe. He works on generative artificial intelligence at Adobe.

== Early life and education ==
Duffey was born to John and Diane Duffey in Milwaukee, Wisconsin. His father was a reading specialist. He graduated from Marquette University’s Diederich College of Communication and later completed executive study in artificial intelligence and technology at the MIT Sloan School of Management.

== Career ==
Duffey worked in the advertising business since 2000, until joining Adobe in 2017. He worked on Adobe Sensei, the company's machine learning framework.

Duffey has written about the relationships between artificial intelligence and mobile technologies. In 2014, The Guardian named his co-authored piece, "How Mobile Became Mighty in Healthcare", to their Top Ten Best Healthcare Stories of the Year.

In 2019, Duffey published Superhuman Innovation: Transforming Business with Artificial Intelligence; the book was partially AI-generated by an artificial intelligence program called Aimé. The book was included in the Consumer Electronics Show's 2020 "Gary’s Book Club", with TechRepublic named the book as one of their "45 books every techie should read".
