= Bill Duffy (sportsman) =

Australian sportsman (1866–1959)

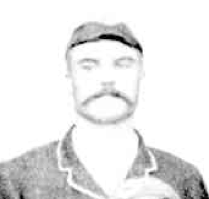

Personal information
- Full name: William Vincent Duffy
- Born: 8 July 1866; Doutta Galla, Colony of Victoria
- Died: 13 June 1959 (aged 92); Subiaco, Western Australia
- Batting: Right-handed
- Bowling: Right-arm off-break Right-arm fast-medium

Domestic team information
- Years: Team
- 1892/93: Western Australia

Career statistics
Competition	First-class
Matches	3
Runs scored	62
Batting average	15.50
100s/50s	0/0
Top score	42
Balls bowled	363
Wickets	8
Bowling average	29.37
5 wickets in innings	1
10 wickets in match	0
Best bowling	5/124
Catches/stumpings	1/–
- Source: CricketArchive, 8 November 2011

William Vincent Duffy (8 July 1866 – 13 June 1959) was an Australian sportsman who played cricket for Western Australia and football for the Rovers and West Perth Football Clubs in the West Australian Football Association (WAFA). He also umpired at high levels in both sports.

Duffy was born in Doutta Galla, Victoria, but moved to Perth in the late 1880s to coach West Perth in the WACA district cricket competition. He participated in the first tour of the eastern colonies by a Western Australian team in 1893, playing two first-class matches on the tour. Against Victoria in April 1893, he took 5/124 from 31 overs while opening the bowling, the first five-wicket haul by a Western Australian bowler. Duffy had previously played in a first-class game in 1887, a match in Melbourne between "Smokers" and "Non-Smokers". When the WACA Ground opened in 1893, Duffy was appointed curator. He was elected secretary of the West Perth Cricket Club in 1894, and also received a prize for the "best all-round player" at the club for the previous season.

In 1897, Duffy umpired an exhibition game between George Giffen's XI and a Western Australia XVIII, featuring a number of national players, including Joe Darling, Clem Hill, Syd Gregory and Ernie Jones. The Western Mail said he "fulfilled every duty appertaining to the position with the utmost satisfaction to everybody concerned." Duffy was also a noted footballer for Rovers and West Perth in the local competition. In 1894, he finished third in the league's goalkicking, with 18 goals for the season, two behind the eventual leader. He also umpired one game in September 1893. In 1928 and 1929, he participated in a "veterans' cricket match" held at the WACA Ground. He later become involved with the Grand Theatre Company, and died in Subiaco in 1959.
