= USS Duffy (DE-27) =

Evarts-class destroyer escort

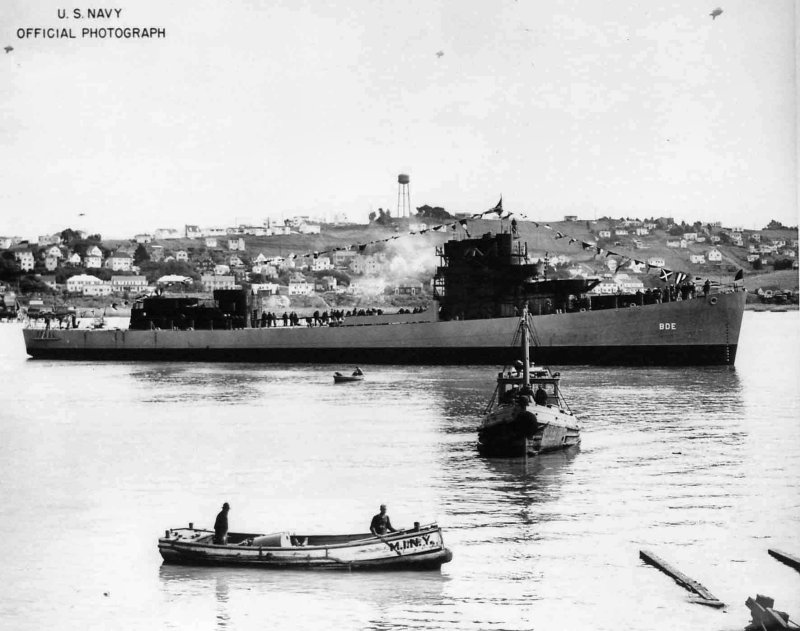
- USS Duffy (DE-27)

History

United States
- Name: Duffy
- Namesake: Charles John Duffy
- Builder: Mare Island Navy Yard
- Laid down: 29 October 1942
- Launched: 16 April 1943
- Commissioned: 5 August 1943
- Decommissioned: 9 November 1945
- Honors and awards: 2 battle stars (World War II)
- Fate: Sold for scrap on 16 June 1947

General characteristics
- Class & type: Evarts-class destroyer escort
- Displacement: 1,420 long tons (1,443 t) full
- Length: 289 ft (88 m)
- Beam: 35 ft (11 m)
- Draft: 8 ft 3 in (2.51 m)
- Speed: 21 knots (39 km/h)
- Complement: 156
- Armament: 3 × single 3"/50 Mk.22 dual-purpose guns; 1 × quad 1.1"/75 Mk.2 AA gun; 9 × 20 mm Mk.4 AA guns; 1 × Hedgehog Projector Mk.10 (144 rounds); 8 × Mk.6 depth charge projectors; 2 × Mk.9 depth charge tracks

USS Duffy (DE-27) was an Evarts-class destroyer escort that served in the Pacific during World War II.

== Design ==
The Evarts-class destroyer escorts were 289 ft 5 in (88.21 m) long overall, and they had a beam of 35 ft 2 in (10.72 m). They had an average draft of 10 ft 1 in (3.07 m) at their full load displacement of 1,416 long tons (1,439 t). Each ship had a normal crew numbered 156 officers and sailors.

Duffy was propelled by a pair of diesel motors manufactured by General Motors, which drove a pair of screw propellers. Her propulsion system was rated to produce 6,000 brake horsepower (4,500 kW) for a top speed of 19.5 knots (36.1 km/h; 22.4 mph). Oil storage amounted to between 131 and 197 long tons (133 and 200 t), which allowed a cruising radius of up to 6,000 nautical miles (11,000 km; 6,900 mi) at an economical pace of 10 knots (19 km/h; 12 mph).

The ship's armament consisted of a main battery of three 3-inch (76 mm) /50-caliber guns in individual pivot mounts, which could be used against air or surface targets. These were supported by a light anti-aircraft battery that initially consisted of four 1.1 in (28 mm) /75-caliber guns in a quadruple mount and nine 20 mm (0.79 in) Oerlikon guns. For attacks against submarines, the ship was equipped with a Hedgehog mortar, eight depth charge throwers, and two depth charge racks.

== Service history ==
Duffy was launched from the Mare Island Navy Yard on 16 April 1943, and was originally intended for transfer to the British Royal Navy. Instead, she was commissioned by the U.S. Navy on 5 August 1943. The ship had been renamed Duffy after Charles Duffy, a naval aviator killed during the Naval Battle of Casablanca on 8 November 1942.

Duffy sailed from San Francisco 2 October 1943 escorting a convoy to Pearl Harbor where she joined in training exercises before joining the 5th Fleet. On 10 November she sailed in the screen for carriers bound for air strikes on Mille Atoll, Jaluit, and Makin in the Marshall Islands. A week later Duffy was detached to escort USS Neosho during the invasion of the Gilbert Islands, returning to Pearl Harbor on 15 December.

Departing Pearl Harbor 22 January 1944 in the escort for an LST convoy, Duffy arrived off Kwajalein 2 February for the assault landings the next day. Two days later she sailed, escorting unladen transports to Funafuti, Ellice Islands, arriving 8 February. Duffy served on escort and patrol duty in the Solomons between 19 February and 28 September, then between Manus and Ulithi until 25 October, and through November in the Marianas. On 30 November she sailed from Saipan escorting a group of LSTs with men, supplies, and equipment, unloading at Leyte 6 to 13 December for the retaking of the Philippines. Protecting the convoy during unloading, Duffy scored several hits on an enemy plane which crashed on the beach during an air raid.

Returning to Saipan 27 December 1944, Duffy served on patrol and local escort duty in the Marianas and to Majuro until 27 May 1945. She covered air strikes on Maloelap, sailing close to the island to stand by for air-sea rescue work if necessary, and on the 29th fired a shore bombardment. Duffy continued to operate from Majuro, bombarding and waging psychological warfare against bypassed Japanese-held islands. On 14 June she took prisoner seven men of the cutoff garrison on Mille Atoll.

Duffy sailed from Kwajalein 13 July 1945 for the west coast, arriving at San Francisco 26 July. She was decommissioned there 9 November 1945 and sold 16 June 1947.

== Awards ==
- Combat Action Ribbon (retroactive)
- American Campaign Medal
- Asiatic–Pacific Campaign Medal (with two service stars)
- World War II Victory Medal
