= Eimar O'Duffy =

Irish writer (1893–1935)

Eimar Ultan O'Duffy
- Born: 29 September 1893; Dublin, Ireland
- Died: 21 March 1939 (aged 45); New Malden, Surrey
- Education: University College Dublin
- Occupations: Writer, teacher, civil servant, journalist
- Spouse: Kathleen Patricia Cruise
- Children: 2
- Writing career
- Genres: Drama, fiction, poetry, journalism

Eimar Ultan O'Duffy (29 September 1893 – 21 March 1935) was an Irish writer who was involved in the Irish nationalist movement until the events of the 1916 Easter Rising.

== Early life ==
Eimar Ultan O'Duffy was born on 29 September 1893 in Dublin, the son of Kevin O'Duffy, a prominent society dentist. He was educated at Belvedere College in Dublin, Stonyhurst College in Lancashire, and University College Dublin, where he took a degree in dentistry, although he never practised the profession. During his time at university, O'Duffy developed strong political and cultural interests, editing the student magazine St Stephen's. His father had wished for him to join the British army, but O'Duffy refused and was consequently estranged from his family.

== Revolutionary nationalist activity ==
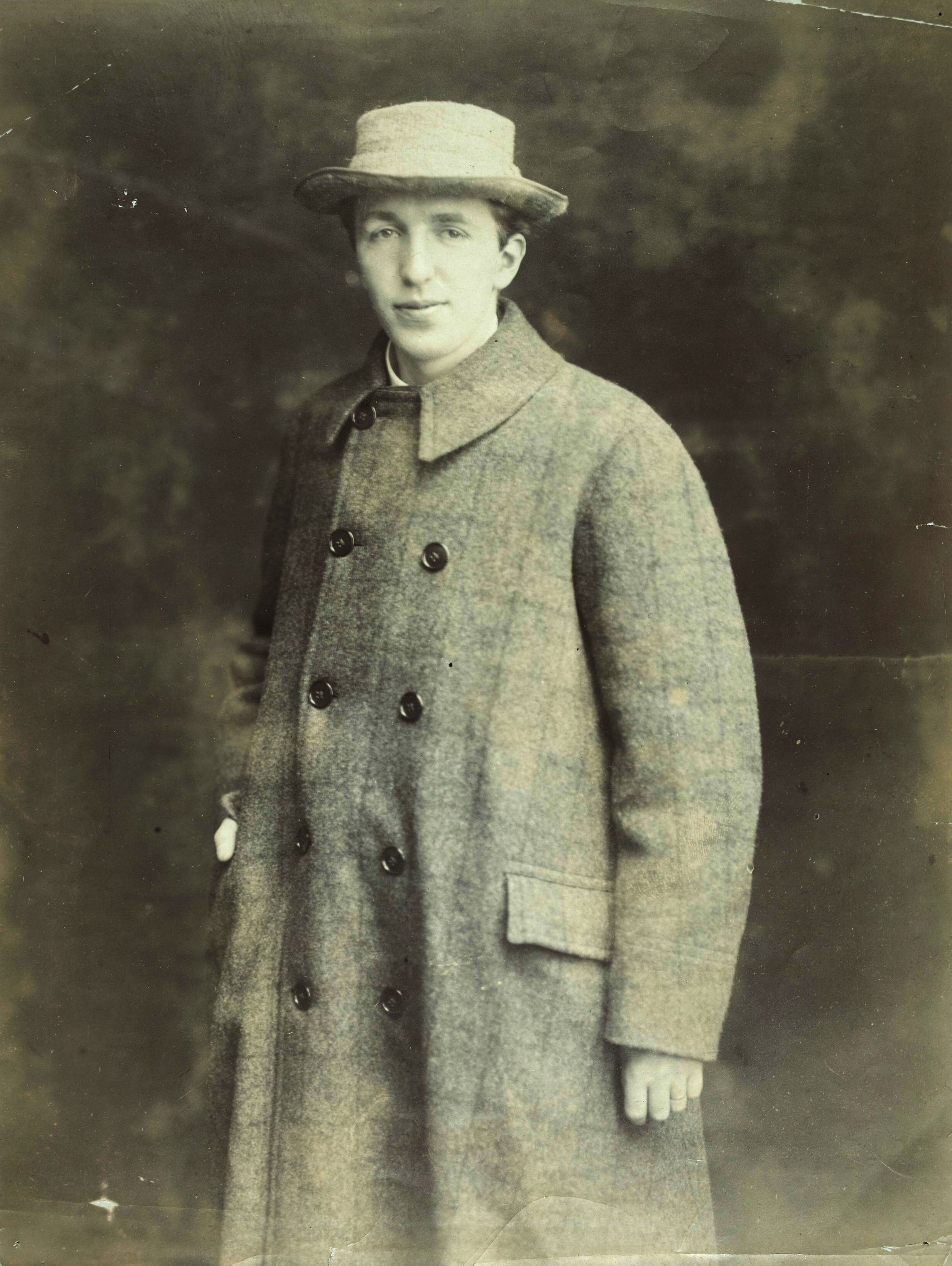
Bulmer Hobson

Eoin MacNeill

In the 1910s, O'Duffy became involved with Irish nationalist organisations, joining the Irish Republican Brotherhood and the Irish Volunteers. He contributed to military affairs to the Volunteers’ newspaper, the Irish Volunteer. In 1916, he and Bulmer Hobson warned Eoin MacNeill, the nominal head of the Irish Volunteers, of the impending Easter Rising. In response, MacNeill sent messengers around the country to call off the manoeuvres, which were the cover for the Rising and placed advertisements in newspapers to cancel them. O'Duffy and Hobson went to the North, where O'Duffy was sent to Belfast to dissuade volunteers from participating. O'Duffy remained critical of the Rising throughout his life, maintaining that it had been a mistake, and increasingly embraced socialist ideas.

== Writing career ==
Eimar O'Duffy’s writing career began in the mid-1910s with drama and periodical contributions. In 1915, two of his early plays, The Phoenix on the Roof and The Walls of Athens, were staged by Edward Martyn’s Irish Theatre. In 1919, he published Bricriu's Feast, a comedy drawing on Irish mythology and featuring characters such as Cú Chulainn, the Red Branch Knights, and Queen Maeve.

In 1919, O'Duffy published his first novel, The Wasted Island, a semi-autobiographical Bildungsroman and intellectual critique of Irish society and the 1916 Rising. The protagonist, Bernard Lascelles, reflects O'Duffy’s own Anglo-Irish background and opposition to the Rising. In 1922, he produced Printer’s Errors, a gentle comic satire, followed by The Lion and the Fox, a historical novel set in Elizabethan Ireland, and Miss Rudd and Some Lovers (1923), a light romantic entertainment. During 1922–1923, he also edited issues of the Irish Review with Padraic Colum and others, demonstrating his engagement with literary and cultural debates of the period.

Following the establishment of the Irish Free State, O'Duffy’s political views limited his employment prospects. He worked for a period as a teacher and in the Department of External Affairs before relocating to England in 1925 and later to Paris, where he was employed by an American newspaper.

O'Duffy’s most significant work is the Cuanduine trilogy. The first novel, King Goshawk and the Birds (1926), combines satire, fantasy, and Irish myth to critique capitalism, hero cults, and social inequality. It depicts a future world dominated by industrial magnates, featuring a revived Cú-Chulainn whose son, Cuanduine, continues his adventures. The second novel, The Spacious Adventures of the Man in the Street (1928), follows Aloysius O’Kennedy, a Lemuel Gulliver-like figure, to the planet Rathé, where O'Duffy satirises social norms, indulgence, and moral inconsistencies. The final volume, Asses in Clover (1933), returns to Cuanduine’s confrontation with King Goshawk, though it is generally regarded as less accomplished than its predecessors.

In parallel with fiction, O'Duffy wrote plays throughout his life. His final play, Malachy the Great (1930), a historical drama set in the tenth century, was never performed or published. In the 1930s, facing financial pressure and ill health, he produced several detective novels, including The Bird Cage, The Secret Enemy, and Head of a Girl, while also publishing Life and Money (1932), an economic analysis advocating social credit.

King Goshawk and the Birds was reprinted by Dalkey Archive Press in 2017, with a new introduction by Robert Hogan. The Spacious Adventures of the Man in the Street was also reprinted by Dalkey Archive Press in 2018.

== Personal life ==
O'Duffy married Kathleen Cruise in 1920. The couple had two children, Brian, born in 1921, and Rosalind, born in 1924. He died of a duodenal ulcer on 21 March 1935 in Surrey, England.

== Works ==
- The Walls of Athens (1914)
- The Phoenix on the Roof (1915)
- The Wasted Island (1919)
- The Lion and the Fox (1921)
- Printer's Errors (1922)
- Miss Rudd and Some Lovers (1923)
- King Goshawk and the Birds (1926) - satire
- The Spacious Adventures of the Man in the Street (1928) - satire
- Life and Money: Being a Critical Examination of the Principles and Practice of Orthodox Economics
- The Bird Cage (New York, 1932),
- The Secret Enemy (New York, 1932)
- Asses in Clover (London: Putnam's 1933) - satire
- Consumer Credit: A Pamphlet. London: The Prosperity League, 1934
- Heart of a Girl: A Mystery Novel (London: Geoffrey Bles, 1935 New York, 1935)
