= Cherington =

Cherington may refer to:

Places

- Cherington, Gloucestershire in England
- Cherington, Warwickshire in England

People

- Ben Cherington (born 1974), American baseball executive
- Fletcher B. Cherington (1850–1908), American Methodist reverend
