= J. P. Riddle Stadium =

Stadium in Fayetteville, North Carolina, US

- The Swamp
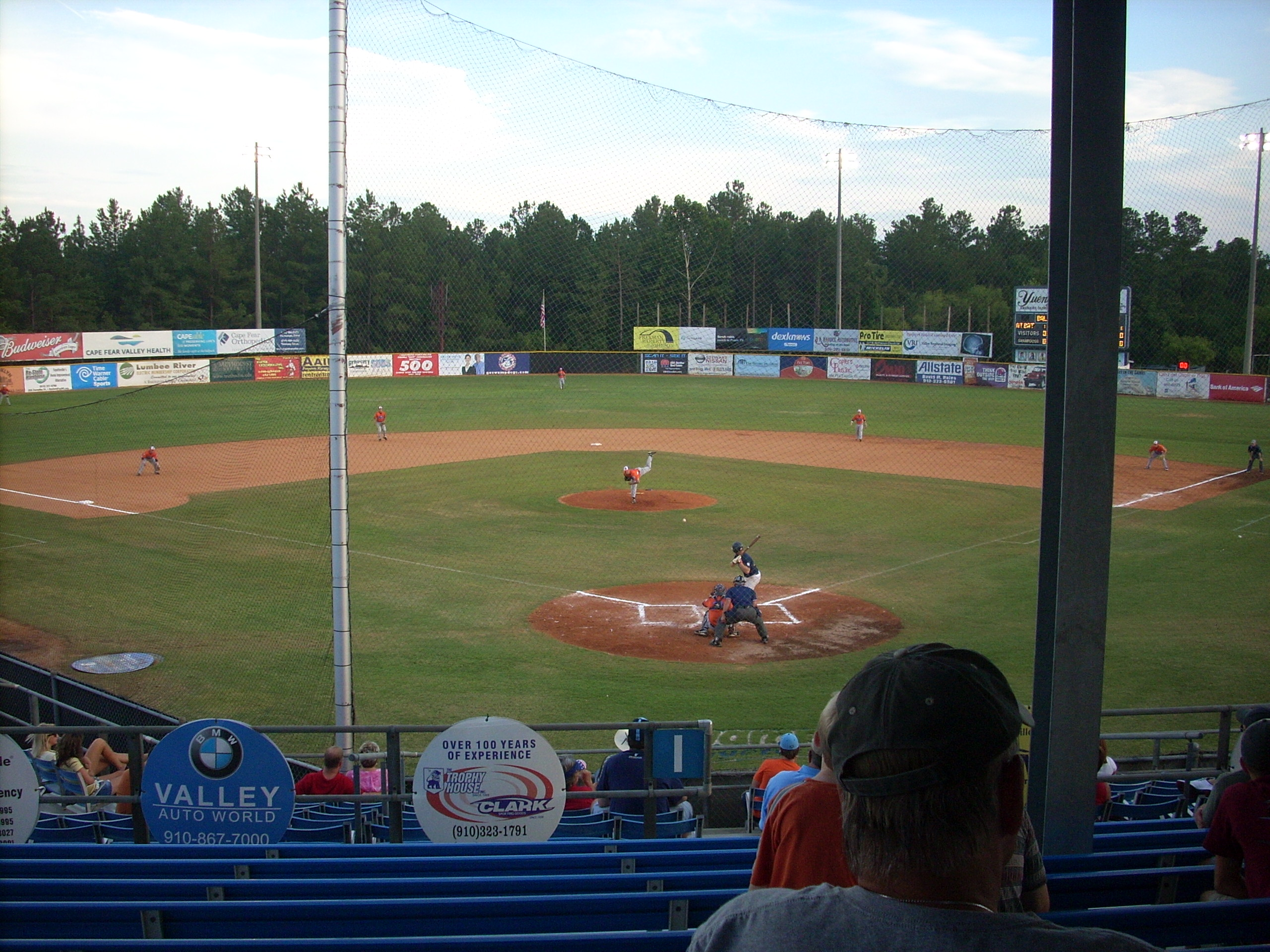
- J. P. Riddle Stadium on June 23, 2011
- Interactive map of J. P. Riddle Stadium
- Address: 2823 Legion Road; Fayetteville, North Carolina
- Coordinates: 35.008223°N 78.909656°W
- Owner: Fayetteville Technical Community College (FTCC)
- Capacity: 2,500 to 5,000
- Current use: Baseball

Construction
- Opened: 1987

Tenants
- Carolina Coyotes / Fayetteville Chutes (ONSL) 2020–2023; FTCC Trojans (NJCAA) 2019–present Fayetteville SwampDogs (CPL) 2001–2019; Cape Fear Crocs (SAL) 1997–2000; Fayetteville Generals (SAL) 1987–1996

J. P. Riddle Stadium is a stadium in Fayetteville, North Carolina, owned by Fayetteville Technical Community College (FTCC). It is primarily used for baseball and was the home of the Fayetteville Generals/Cape Fear Crocs baseball team. The ballpark has a capacity of 2,500 to 5,000 people and opened in 1987. J. P. Riddle Stadium is currently home to the FTCC Trojans. It was the 19-year home of the Fayetteville SwampDogs of the collegiate summer baseball Coastal Plain League. The SwampDogs announced on October 3, 2019, that they would sit out the 2020 Coastal Plain League season and relocate afterwards, having failed to reach a new lease agreement. The stadium has been nicknamed the Swamp.

The Carolina Coyotes of the collegiate summer baseball Old North State League played the 2020 season at J. P. Riddle Stadium, allowing only 25 spectators per game due to the COVID-19 pandemic. In 2021, the team was renamed the Fayetteville Chutes. The Chutes left J. P. Riddle Stadium after the 2023 season, rebranding as the Hope Mills Rockfish, playing in Hope Mills, North Carolina.
