= Tyler Tumminia =

American ice hockey and baseball executive (born c. 1979)

- Born: 1979 (age 46–47)
- Education: Mount Saint Mary College
- Occupation: Sports executive
- Known for: 2nd Commissioner of the Premier Hockey Federation
- Spouse: Ben Cherington
- Children: 2

Tyler Adwen Tumminia (born c. 1979) is an American sports executive and former commissioner of the Premier Hockey Federation (PHF). Prior to her involvement with the PHF, she was a baseball executive and partial owner of several Minor League Baseball (MiLB) teams.

== Career ==
Tumminia worked in public relations with IBM before making her foray into sports in 2003 as an intern with the Hudson Valley Renegades. Her time as an intern was short, as the team named her director of community relations just six weeks after she began her internship. Tumminia ultimately remained with the Renegades organization for less than a year as, in 2004, she joined the Goldklang Group, a sports entertainment consulting and management firm. Goldklang Group operates several Minor League Baseball teams, including the Hudson Valley Renegades, Charleston RiverDogs, St. Paul Saints, Pittsfield Suns, and, previously, the Fort Myers Miracle. She was promoted to senior vice president of the company in February 2011. In October 2011, she graduated from Major League Baseball's Scout Development Program.

In 2014, Tumminia was listed on Bleacher Report's 25 Most Influential Women in Sports. She left Goldklang Group at the conclusion of the 2016 season.

In April 2020, Tumminia was announced as chairman of the Toronto Six, the first Canadian expansion team of the National Women's Hockey League (NWHL; rebranded as PHF in 2021). Six months later, in October 2020, the NWHL made significant changes to its governance structure and Tumminia was named interim commissioner of the league. She became the second commissioner in NWHL history, preceded by league founder and president Dani Rylan Kearney. She became the permanent commissioner on August 4, 2021.

On February 19, 2022, it was reported that Tumminia was not seeking to renew her contract as commissioner and would step down at the end of the 2021–22 PHF season. During her time as commissioner, Tumminia secured a streaming agreement with ESPN, oversaw the rebranding of the league from the NWHL to the PHF, and achieved an investment commitment of over $25 million in pay and benefits to players from the board of governors. She was succeeded by Reagan Carey on May 10, 2022.

== Personal life ==
Tumminia's father, John Tumminia, worked as a scout for the Chicago White Sox and is the reason she was named after Ty Cobb.

Tumminia is a graduate of Mount Saint Mary College.

She married current Pittsburgh Pirates general manager Ben Cherington in April 2012. The couple have two daughters.
