= Roy Majtyka =

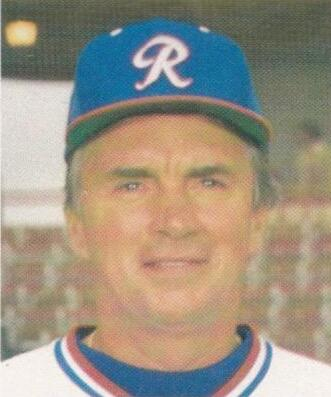
- Majtyka with the Richmond Braves c. 1987
- Coach
- Born: June 1, 1939; Buffalo, New York, U.S.
- Died: February 24, 2025 (aged 85); Wagoner, Oklahoma, U.S.
- Batted: Right Threw: Right

Teams
- Atlanta Braves (1988–1990)

LeRoy Walter Majtyka (June 1, 1939 – February 24, 2025) was an American infielder and manager in minor league baseball. He also spent three seasons in the Major Leagues as a coach with the Atlanta Braves. He threw and batted right-handed, stood 5 ft 11 in (1.80 m) tall and weighed 170 lb (77 kg) during his active career.

Majtyka was born in Buffalo, New York. He graduated from Buffalo's St. Francis High School in 1958 and attended the University at Buffalo.

He signed with the St. Louis Cardinals in 1959 as a shortstop, but as he rose in the Cardinal organization he switched to third base and second base. He played one full season of Triple-A baseball – in 1965, split between the Jacksonville Suns and Toledo Mud Hens of the International League – but never reached the big leagues as a player. In his best season, 1963, he batted .281 in 445 at bats with 7 home runs and 57 runs batted in playing for the Tulsa Oilers of the Texas League.

Majtyka managed for 27 years in the minor leagues, beginning with the Cardinals' farm system in 1968, and also working with the Cincinnati Reds, Detroit Tigers, Braves and Philadelphia Phillies. His 1973 St. Petersburg Cardinals won the Florida State League championship and Majtyka was cited as Manager of the Year in the Eastern League for leading the 1976 Trois-Rivières Aigles to a division title.

His three seasons (1988–1990) as a coach with the Braves were the only interruption to a minor-league managerial career (1968–1987; 1991–1997) in which his teams won 1,832 games and lost 1,747, for a winning percentage of .512.

He was in the South Atlantic League Hall of Fame because he ranks in the top 20, all-time, for wins by a minor league manager.

Majtyka died on February 24, 2025, at the age of 85.

Preceded by Russ Nixon	Atlanta Braves third base coach 1988–1990	Succeeded by Jimy Williams
