= South Atlantic League Hall of Fame =

- Established: 1994
- Type: Professional sports hall of fame
- Website: Official website

The South Atlantic League Hall of Fame is an American baseball hall of fame which honors players, managers, executives, and other associates of the Class A South Atlantic League of Minor League Baseball and its predecessor, the Western Carolinas League, for their accomplishments or contributions to the league in playing, administrative, or other roles. The Hall of Fame inducted its first class in 1994. As of 2018, 113 individuals have been inducted into the South Atlantic League Hall of Fame.

== Table key ==
†	Indicates a member of the National Baseball Hall of Fame and Museum
Year	Indicates the year of induction
Position(s)	Indicates the inductee's primary playing position(s) or association with the league
Team inducted as	Indicates the team for which the inductee has been recognized

== Inductees ==
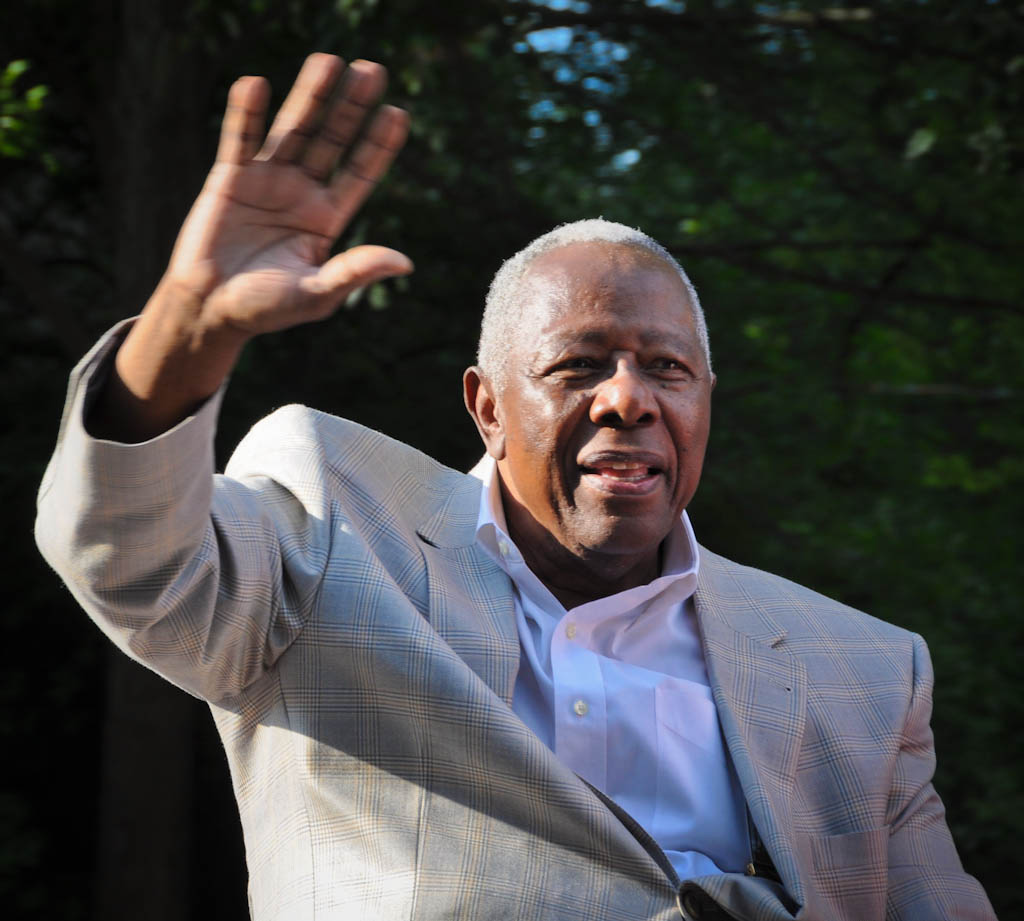
Hank Aaron, inducted in 1994

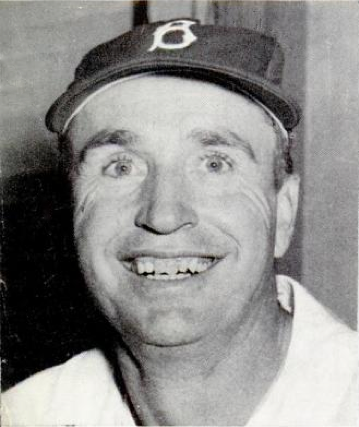
Walter Alston, inducted in 2001

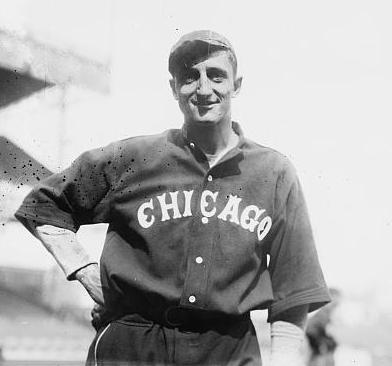
Lena Blackburne, inducted in 2013

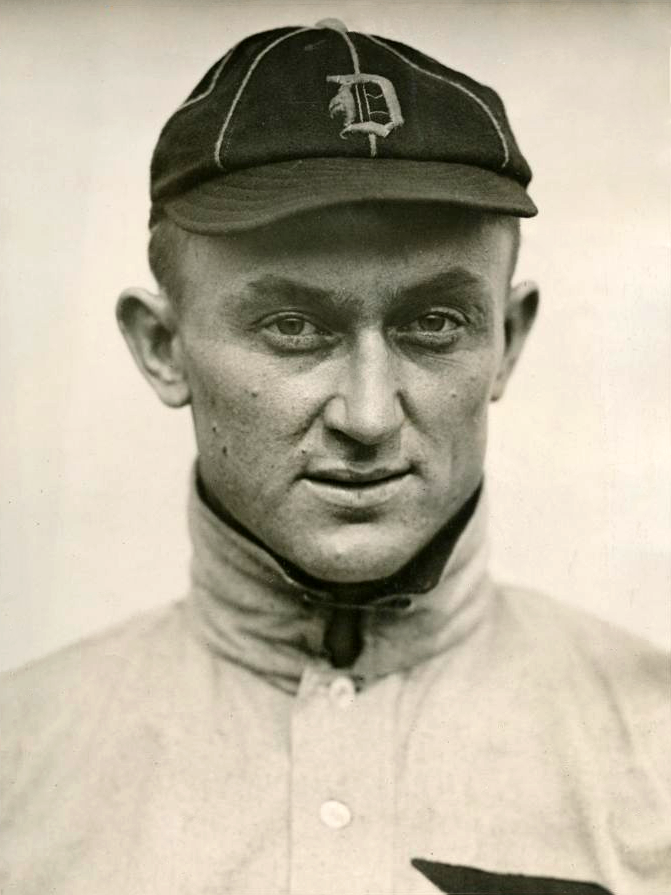
Ty Cobb, inducted in 2001

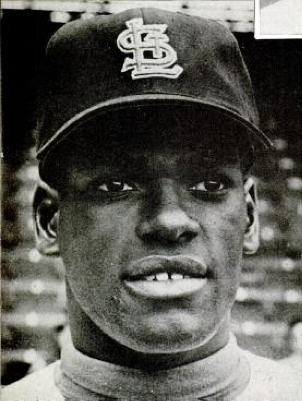
Bob Gibson, inducted in 1995

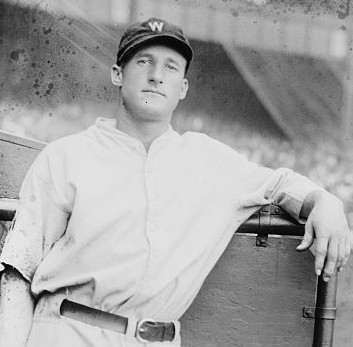
Goose Goslin, inducted in 1995

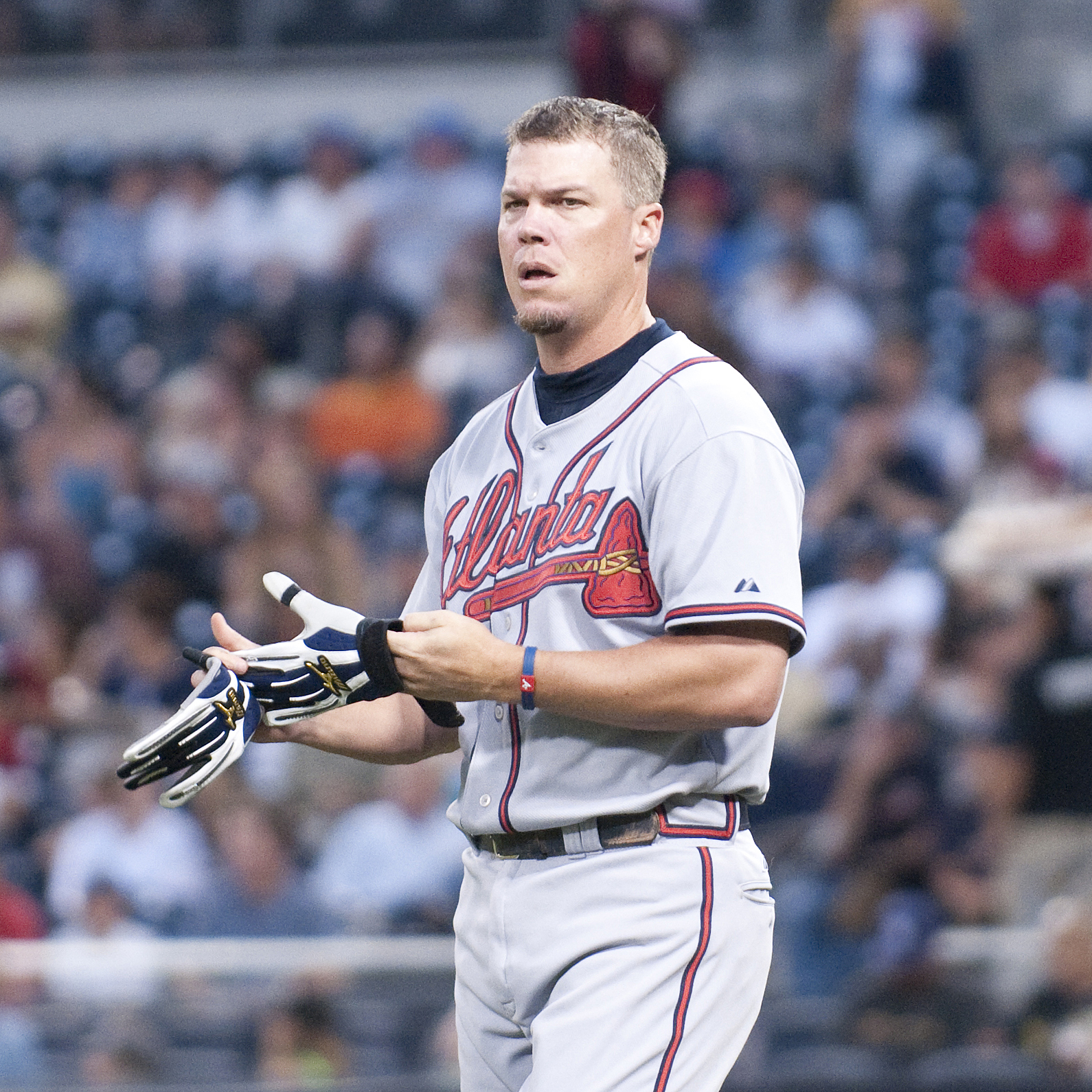
Chipper Jones, inducted in 2007

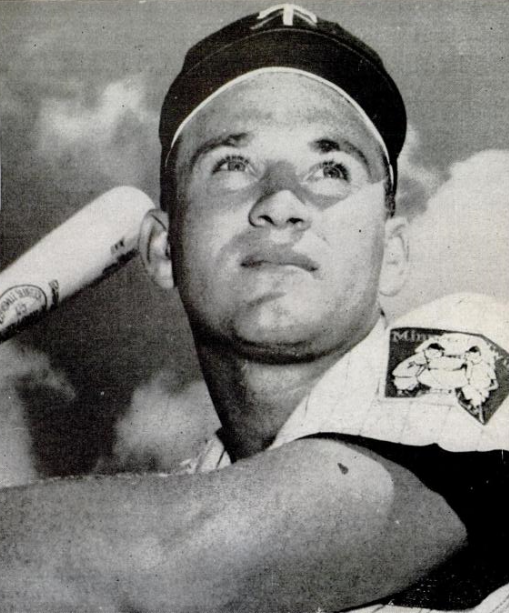
Harmon Killebrew, inducted in 1994

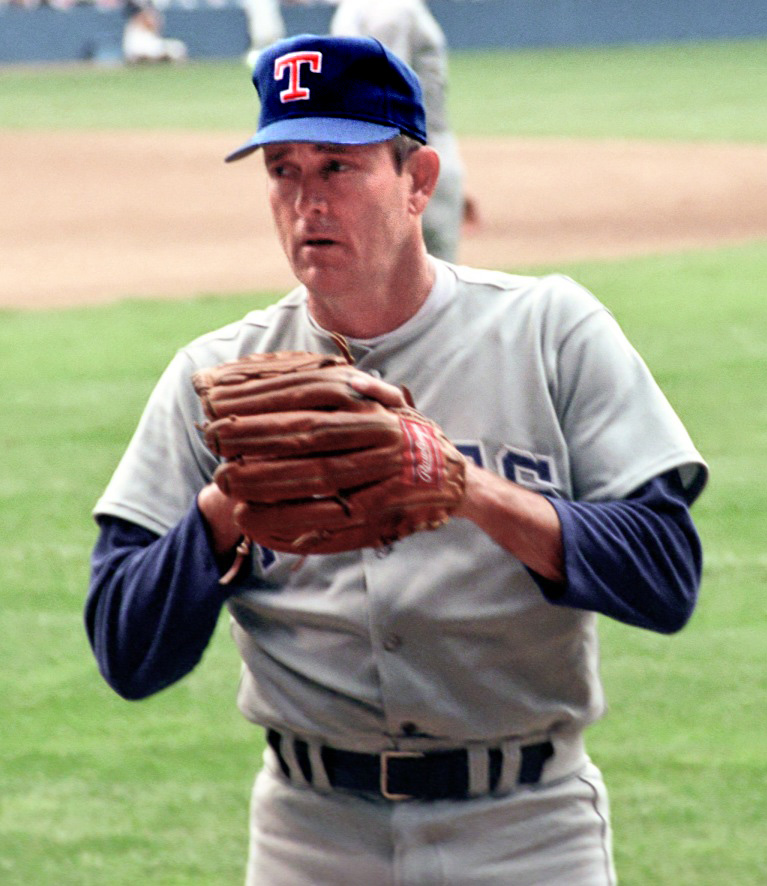
Nolan Ryan, inducted in 1994

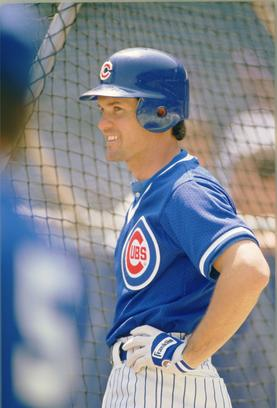
Ryne Sandberg, inducted in 1994

Year	Name	Position(s)
1994	Hank Aaron^{†}	Outfielder
2001	Walter Alston^{†}	Manager
1994	Sparky Anderson^{†}	Manager
2006	Len Barker	Pitcher
1996	Jim Baynes	Team executive
2003	Don Beaver	Team owner
2014	Luther Beaver	Team executive
2008	Buddy Bell	Third baseman
1998	Sheldon "Chief" Bender	Pitcher/Manager
1996	Bill Bethea	Pitcher
2002	Bill Blackwell	Team executive
2013	Lena Blackburne	Inventor
2002	Winston Blenckstone	Team owner/League executive
2005	Bobby Bonds	Outfielder
1995	Bob Bonifay	Team executive
2002	Larry Bowa	Shortstop
1994	Harley Bowers	Sportswriter
1994	Jim Bragan	Second baseman
1994	Lou Brissie	Pitcher
1995	Dave Bristol	Manager
2001	Wilt Browning	Sportswriter
2004	Dick Butler	League President
1994	Steve Carlton^{†}	Pitcher
2003	Happy Chandler	Commissioner of Baseball
1994	Ty Cobb^{†}	Outfielder
2005	Drew Coble	Umpire
2008	Vince Coleman	Outfielder
2001	Murray Cook	Shortstop/Team executive
1995	Cecil Darby	Sportswriter
2008	Bing Devine	Team executive
2010	Mike Dunn	Team executive
1997	Arthur Dwyer	Pitcher
2005	Jack Farnsworth	Team owner/League executive
1994	Julian Fine	Team executive
2017	Joe Finley	Team owner
2003	Doug Flynn	Second baseman
2018	Kenneth Free	Third baseman
1995	Bob Gibson^{†}	Pitcher
2004	Marvin Goldklang	Team owner
2001	John Gordon	Broadcaster
1995	Goose Goslin^{†}	Outfielder
2005	Bob Hagler	Broadcaster
2009	David Haas	Team executive
2011	Mike Hargrove	Manager
2001	Charlie Harville	Broadcaster
2011	Ray Hathaway	Manager
1994	Danny Hayling	Pitcher
2007	Jack Hiatt	Catcher
2005	Marcus Holland	Scorekeeper/Sportswriter
1996	Ed Holtz	Team executive
2007	Leo Hughes	Team owner
2014	Randy Ingle	Manager
1997	Billy Johnson	Third baseman
2007	Chipper Jones^{†}	Shortstop
1994	Harmon Killebrew^{†}	First baseman
2000	Charles Knaupp	Umpire
2001	Tommy Lasorda^{†}	Pitcher
2007	R.E. Littlejohn	Team owner
1995	Al López^{†}	Catcher
1998	Dwight Lowry	Manager
1996	Roy Majtyka	Manager
1994	Don Mattingly	First baseman
2012	Carolyn McKee	Team executive
1999	Ron McKee	Team executive
2008	Johnnie McKenzie	Umpire
2018	Jim Melvin	Mayor of Greensboro
2009	Joe Mikulik	Manager
2006	Chip Moore	League executive
2018	Donald Moore	Team executive
1998	Charles Morrow	Team owner
2004	Elaine Moss	League executive
1994	John Henry Moss	League President
1997	Dale Murphy	Catcher
2014	George Murphy	Public address announcer/Mayor of Hickory
2012	Bill Murray	Team owner
1999	Eddie Murray^{†}	First baseman
2003	Phil Niekro^{†}	Pitcher
2002	Dan	Team executive
2000	Pat O'Conner	Team executive
2007	Al Oliver	First baseman
1998	Michael Paterno	Team executive
2011	Frank Perdue	Stadium benefactor
2006	Aaron Pointer	First baseman
2010	John Purdin	Pitcher
1996	Pat Putnam	First baseman
2016	Brad Redmon	Team owner
1994	Spec Richardson	Team executive
2003	Branch Rickey^{†}	Financier of Western Carolinas League
2012	Joseph P. Riley Jr.	Mayor of Charleston
1998	Mel Roberts	Manager
1994	Frank Robinson^{†}	Outfielder
2007	Verner Ross	Team owner
1994	Nolan Ryan^{†}	Pitcher
1994	Ryne Sandberg^{†}	Second baseman
1998	Gene Sapakoff	Sportswriter
2010	Curt Schilling	Pitcher
2013	Robert Singer	Legislator
1995	Enos Slaughter^{†}	Outfielder
1999	Paul Snyder	Manager
1998	Marty Springstead	Umpire
1995	Don Stafford	First baseman
1994	Willie Stargell^{†}	Outfielder
2005	Alan Stein	Team executive
2017	Tim Straus	Coach
2000	Theodore Szemplenski	Pitcher
2000	Bob Terrell	Sportswriter
2006	Mike Veeck	Team owner
2002	Joe West	Umpire
1996	Hoyt Wilhelm^{†}	Pitcher
2004	Earl Williams	Outfielder
1996	Pat Williams	Team executive
2008	Matt Winters	Outfielder
2014	Charles Young	Lawyer/Team owner
