= Heritage Financial Park =

Baseball park in Wappingers Falls, New York, US

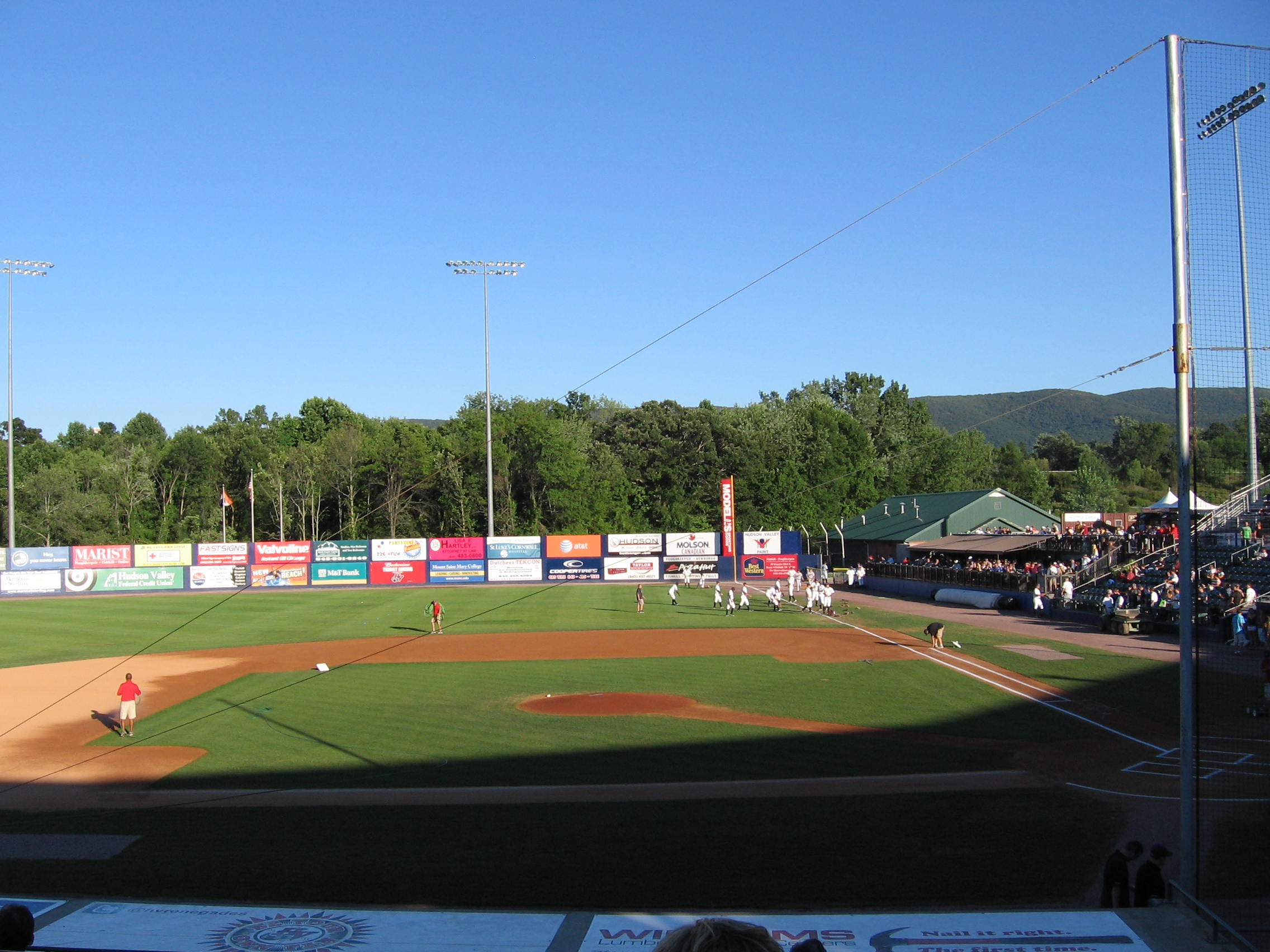

- Location within New York Location within the United States
- Interactive map of Heritage Financial Park
- Former names: Dutchess Stadium (1994–2022)
- Address: 1500 Route 9D; Wappingers Falls, NY 12590
- Coordinates: 41°31′40.48″N 73°57′39.84″W
- Owner: Dutchess County
- Operator: Dutchess County
- Capacity: 5,400
- Surface: Astro-Turf
- Field size: Left field: 325 ft (99 m); Center field: 400 ft (120 m); Right field: 325 ft (99 m)

Construction
- Groundbreaking: January 20, 1994
- Opened: June 18, 1994
- Cost: $8.3 million ($18 million in 2025 dollars)
- Architect: Liscum McCormack VanVoorhis LLP
- Structural engineer: Geiger Engineers
- Services engineer: Fellenzer Engineering LLP
- General contractor: Meyer Contracting Corporation

Tenants
- Hudson Valley Renegades (NYPL/SAL) 1994–present Manhattan Jaspers (NCAA) 2015–2019; Hudson Valley Fort (FXFL) 2015

Website
- heritagefinancialpark.com

Heritage Financial Park is a baseball park in Fishkill, New York. Home to the Hudson Valley Renegades, the park originally opened on June 18, 1994. Originally called Dutchess Stadium from 1994 to 2023, it assumed its current name in March 2023 when a naming-rights deal with Heritage Financial Credit Union was completed.

It has a capacity of 5,400 people and is located on New York State Route 9D across Interstate 84 from Fishkill Correctional Facility.

== History ==
Construction of the stadium began in April 1994 after approval by the Dutchess County Legislature, and opened less than three months later in June 1994.

The entire field, excluding the pitchers mound and home plate area, was converted to AstroTurf in the spring of 2014.

The stadium hosted K104.7's annual KFest concert each year in early June from 1999 to 2016 and again in 2023. Performing artists have included Akon, Rihanna, Fat Joe, Counting Crows, Collective Soul, Wilco, Def Leppard, Bob Dylan, Drake and Adam Lambert, among others.

=== 2020s renovations ===
With the restructuring of Minor League Baseball in 2021, and the subsequent change in affiliation from the Tampa Bay Rays to the New York Yankees, major renovations were undertaken between 2022 and 2024 to improve player and team facilities and enhance the fan experience at the ballpark. Renovations were completed in keeping with Major League Baseball Player Development License, which included modernized facility standards for Minor League teams.

Upgrades to the stadium involved renovating the existing clubhouse in right field for use by visiting teams and constructing a new home clubhouse in left field. Bullpens were moved from an exposed location in foul territory to beyond the outfield fence. Improvements were made to batting cages in right field, and the entire 2014 playing surface was replaced in time for the 2024 season with a brand new surface comparable to turf fields used in the major leagues.

Fan-facing upgrades involved the extension of seating along the left field line, adjacent to and atop the new home clubhouse. Standard field-level seating was extended toward the left field corner, with a rooftop party deck and a premium club lounge built above the clubhouse facility.

Renovations expanded seating to a 5,400 capacity, and for the first time, fans can sit in fair territory beyond the outfield wall.

== Tenants ==
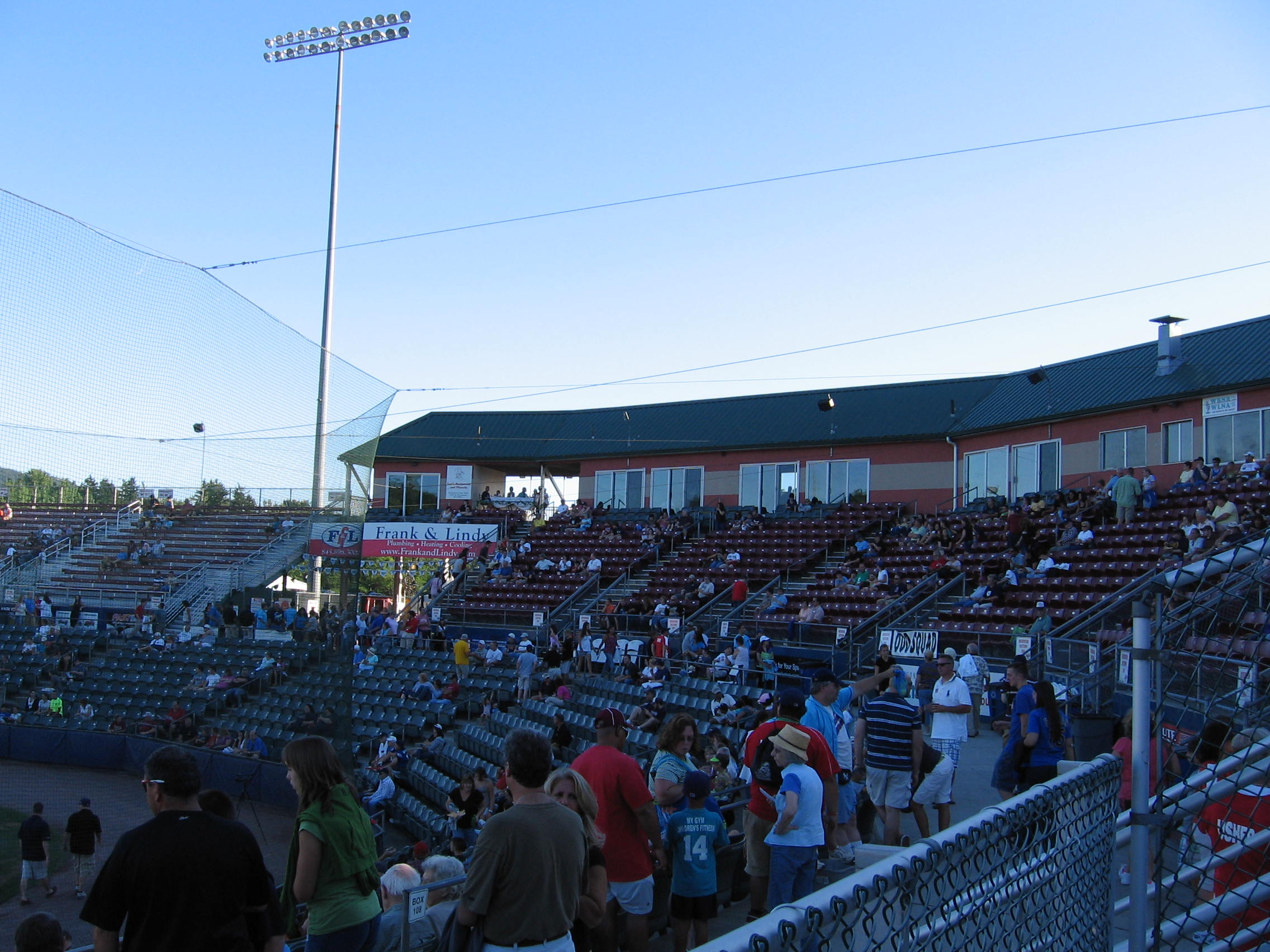
August 2010

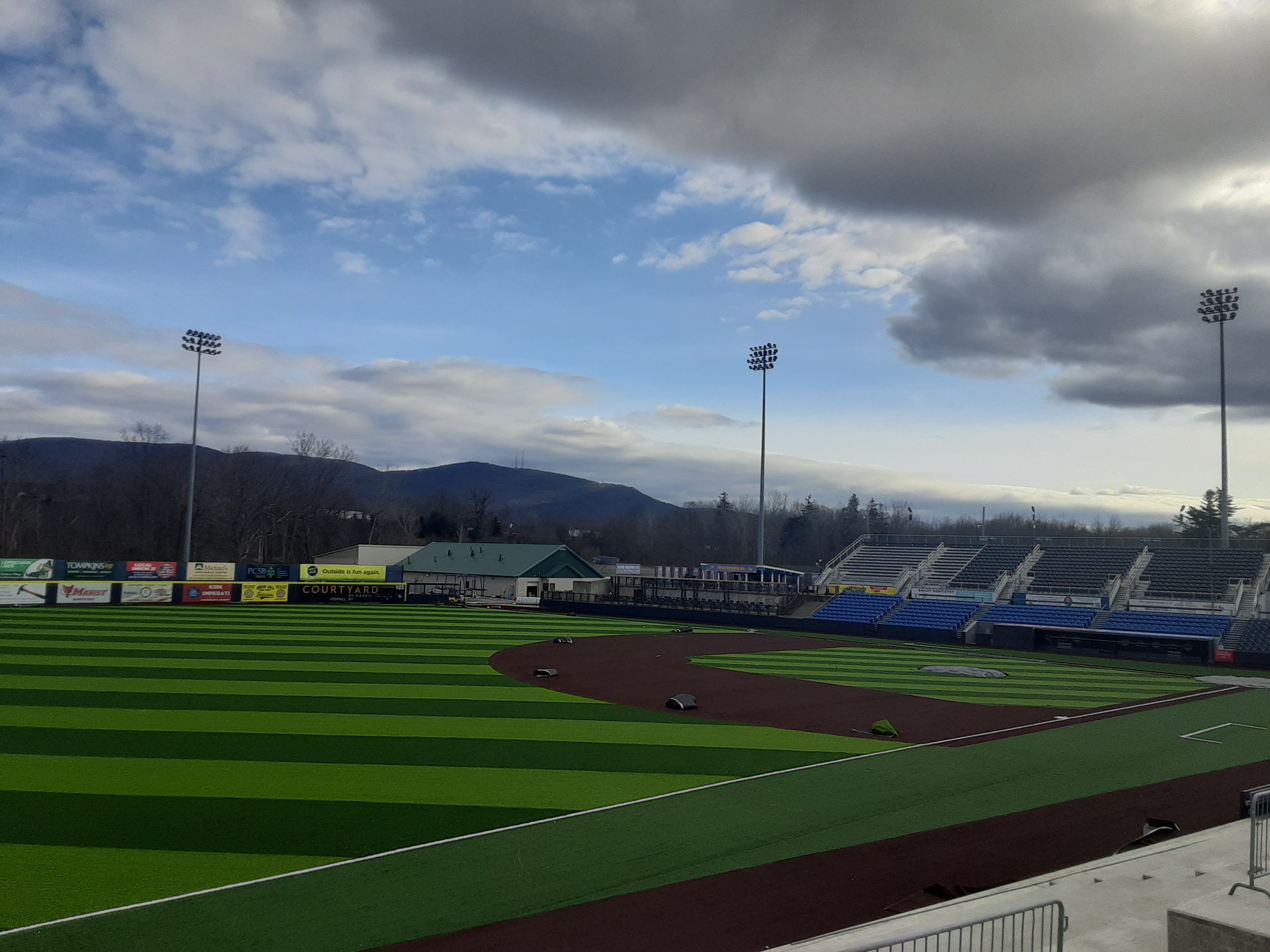
March 2024

=== Current ===
The stadium is primarily used for baseball, as the home field of the Hudson Valley Renegades minor league baseball team, which as of 2024 is a South Atlantic League affiliate of the New York Yankees.

Roy C. Ketcham High School, who were the New York State champions in baseball in 2023, has played occasional home games at the stadium over the years.

=== Former ===
From 2009 to at least 2018, the stadium hosted the Hudson Valley Baseball Classic between Marist College and the United States Military Academy.

The Manhattan College baseball team played home games at the stadium from 2015 to 2019, before returning to Van Cortlandt Park.

The stadium's first football tenant, the Hudson Valley Fort of the Fall Experimental Football League played games at the stadium in October 2015. Some high school football playoff contests were also to be held at the stadium that year, but the stadium was later determined to be unsafe as a football venue and those games were canceled.

== Features ==
Heritage Financial Park has a capacity of 5,400 and features an AstroTurf playing surface, with a symmetrical outfield dimensions measuring 325 feet down the lines and 400 feet to center field.

It comprises a roughly-symmetrical two-level stand which stretched from just past first base to just past third base, and included concessions, a kids area and play areas. Clubhouses are located in the outfield corners, with bullpens beyond the outfield wall. A large LED scoreboard stands beyond the fence in left-center.
