= Valentino Pascucci =

American baseball player and coach (born 1978)

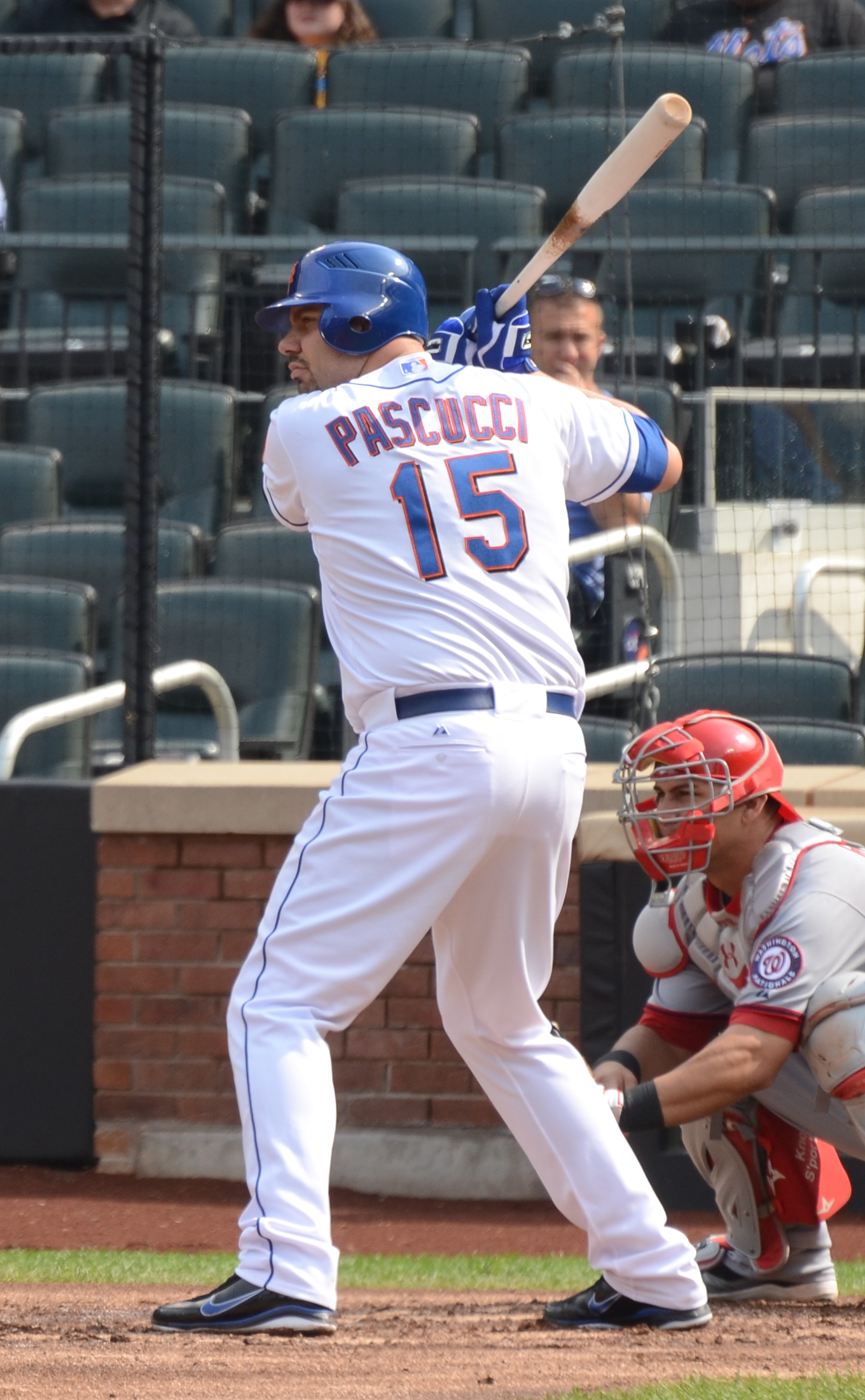
- Pascucci with the New York Mets
- First baseman / Outfielder / Coach
- Born: November 17, 1978 (age 47); Bellflower, California, U.S.
- Batted: Right Threw: Right

Professional debut
- MLB: April 26, 2004, for the Montreal Expos
- NPB: March 26, 2005, for the Chiba Lotte Marines

Last appearance
- MLB: September 27, 2011, for the New York Mets
- NPB: September 17, 2006, for the Chiba Lotte Marines

MLB statistics
- Batting average: .192
- Home runs: 3
- Runs batted in: 8

NPB statistics
- Batting average: .243
- Home runs: 21
- Runs batted in: 52
- Stats at Baseball Reference

Teams
- Montreal Expos (2004); Chiba Lotte Marines (2005–2006); New York Mets (2011)

Valentino Martin Pascucci (born November 17, 1978) is an American former professional baseball first baseman and outfielder. He played in Major League Baseball (MLB) for the Montreal Expos and New York Mets, and in Nippon Professional Baseball (NPB) for the Chiba Lotte Marines. He batted and threw right-handed.

In 2014, he transitioned to the role of hitting coach for the Mets' SingleaA affiliate, the Savannah Sand Gnats. In 2016, he was named the hitting coach for the St. Lucie Mets.

== Career ==
=== High school ===
Pascucci attended Gahr High School in Cerritos, CA.

=== College ===
Pascucci was originally drafted by the Milwaukee Brewers in the 11th round of the 1996 Major League Baseball draft, but he chose to attend college instead. He attended college at the University of Oklahoma for two years, from 1997–1998. He was originally a pitcher, compiling a 4-0 win-loss record with two saves and 64 strikeouts in 58 innings pitched.

=== Montreal Expos ===
The Montreal Expos selected him in the fifteenth round of the 1999 Major League Baseball draft. He began his professional career as a position player.

Pascucci's pro career began in 1999, with the Single-A Vermont Expos. In 2000, with a 20-game stint with the Cape Fear Crocs, the Single-A affiliate of the Expos, Pascucci batted .319 with 3 home runs and 10 RBI and was called up to the High-A Jupiter Hammerheads later that season. He played 113 games for Jupiter, hitting .284 with a .394 on-base percentage. Val was promoted to the Double-A Harrisburg Senators for the 2002 season, where he sent a minor league career high 27 home runs out of the park. He played with the Triple-A Edmonton Trappers for all of 2003 and parts of 2004.

On April 26, 2004, Pascucci was called up by Montréal from Triple-A Edmonton. He debuted for the Expos in right field later that day. Pascucci, however, was sent back down to the minor leagues on May 28. Pascucci was not called back up to the Majors until September 1, when MLB rosters expanded. He hit his first career home run on September 15, 2004 and also played in the final game of the Expos' history on October 3. He was released on December 10, 2004.

=== Chiba Lotte Marines ===
Pascucci spent the 2005 and 2006 seasons with the Chiba Lotte Marines of Japan's Pacific League.

=== Florida Marlins ===
On April 6, 2007, Pascucci was signed by the Florida Marlins and spent the season with their Triple-A affiliate, the Albuquerque Isotopes.

=== Philadelphia Phillies ===
In December 2007, Pascucci signed a minor league contract with the Philadelphia Phillies' Triple-A affiliate, the Lehigh Valley IronPigs.

=== New York Mets ===
After being released by the Phillies on April 29, Pascucci signed a minor league contract with the New York Mets a few days later. He spent the rest of the season playing for the New Orleans Zephyrs, the Mets Triple-A affiliate. He became a free agent at the end of the season.

=== Los Angeles Dodgers ===
In January 2009, he signed a minor league contract with the Los Angeles Dodgers. Pascucci hit only .207 with eight home runs in sixty games with the Triple-A Albuquerque Isotopes before he was released by the Dodgers on June 18, 2009.

=== San Diego Padres ===
Pascucci was signed by the San Diego Padres on June 27, 2009, and assigned to their Triple-A affiliate, the Portland Beavers.

=== New York Mets ===
On May 14, 2010, after a brief stint with the Camden Riversharks, Pascucci signed a minor league deal with the New York Mets, and was assigned to the Triple-A Buffalo Bisons.

In 2011, he was called up when the rosters expanded on September 1, after hitting 21 home runs and driving in 91 RBI with Triple-A Buffalo. He made his Mets debut on September 8, 2011 when he pinch hit for Willie Harris. He got a single against Atlanta Braves pitcher Eric O'Flaherty and was then pinch run for by Jason Pridie. After that, he went 0–5 with a main pinch-hitter role for the team, until on September 24, he hit a game tying pinch-hit home run in the 7th inning off of Philadelphia Phillies pitcher Cole Hamels to tie the game at 1. It was Pascucci's first pinch-hit home run and just the 3rd home run of his Major league career. Val's teammate and Mets third baseman David Wright then hit a go-ahead double in the 8th inning to give the Mets a 2–1 win over their rivals. On the very next day, Pasccuci hit a pinch-hit RBI single against Phillies pitcher Antonio Bastardo. That would be Pasccuci's last hit of the 2011 season. He made a mere two pinch-hit appearances in the Mets' last series of the season against the Cincinnati Reds. Pasccuci finished the 2011 season 3-11, good for a .273 batting average.

On November 17, 2011, the Mets announced that Pascucci would be invited to spring training as a non-roster invitee. He spent the entirety of the 2012 season with Triple-A Buffalo. During the 2012 season, Pascucci was invited to the Triple-A All-Star Game and Home Run Derby held in Buffalo, New York. Pascucci won the Home Run Derby, energizing the home crowd. He became a minor league free agent after 2012 season.

== Coaching career ==
For the 2014 and 2015 seasons, Pascucci served as the hitting coach for the Mets' Single-A affiliate, the Savannah Sand Gnats.

Pascucci was named as the hitting coach for the Binghamton Rumble Ponies of the New York Mets organization for the 2018 season.
