= Cape Fear Crocs =

- 1997–2000; Fayetteville, NC

Minor league affiliations
- Class: Class-A (1997-2000)
- League: South Atlantic League (1997-2000)
- Division: Northern Division

Major league affiliations
- Team: Montreal Expos (1997-2000)

Minor league titles
- League titles: None
- Second-half titles: 1999

Team data
- Name: Cape Fear Crocs (1997-2000)
- Colors: Black, teal, white, green, gold, tan
- Mascot: Dundie the Crocodile
- Ballpark: J. P. Riddle Stadium (1997-2000)

The Cape Fear Crocs were a minor league baseball team in Fayetteville, North Carolina.

They were a low Class-A baseball team which played in the South Atlantic League, and were a farm team of the Montreal Expos for the franchise's entire tenure as the Cape Fear Crocs.

They played all of their home games at J. P. Riddle Stadium and were previously known as the Fayetteville Generals.

Even though the Crocs were a perennial playoff team during their time in the SAL, poor attendance figures and problems having their existing stadium renovated and updated to league standards or even a new downtown stadium built, all proved too much to bear for the ownership of the struggling franchise.

Prior to the 2001 season, the Crocs were sold and moved to New Jersey, where they officially became the Lakewood BlueClaws, and dropped their affiliation with the Expos in favor of becoming an affiliate of the Philadelphia Phillies.

The name 'Crocs' was chosen in a name-the-team contest, beating out entries such as Kings, Force, and Highlanders. Their mascot was the Dundie the Crocodile.

== List of Cape Fear Crocs players in the MLB ==
All players are listed in alphabetical order by their surname, with the year(s) they played for Cape Fear in parentheses.

- Matt Blank (1998)
- Milton Bradley (1998)
- Nate Field (1999)
- Bryan Hebson (1998–1999)
- Jorge Julio (1998)
- Yovanny Lara (1998)
- Cliff Lee (2000)
- Henry Mateo (1998)
- Guillermo Mota (1997)
- Talmadge Nunnari (1997–1998)
- Christian Parker (1997)
- Valentino Pascucci (2000)
- Brandon Phillips (2000)
- Simon Pond (1997)
- Wilkin Ruan (1999–2000)
- Brian Schneider (1997–1998)
- Jim Serrano (1998)
- J.D. Smart (1998)
- Scott Strickland (1997–1998)
- Andy Tracy (1997)
- Wilson Valdéz (2000)
- Tim Young (1997)

== Year-by-year record ==
Year	Record	Finish	Manager	Playoffs
1997	66–74	9th	Phil Stephenson	Lost in South Atlantic League Quarterfinals to the Charleston Alley Cats, 2–0
1998	80–61	4th	Luis Dorante	Lost in South Atlantic League Quarterfinals to the Greensboro Bats, 2–0
1999	75–65	5th	Frank Kremblas	Won South Atlantic League Quarterfinals over the Hagerstown Suns, 2–0; Won South Atlantic League Semifinals over the Capital City Bombers, 2–1; Lost in South Atlantic League Finals to the Augusta Greenjackets, 2–1
2000	64–74	10th	Bill Masse	
