= Dwight Lowry =

American baseball player (1957–1997)

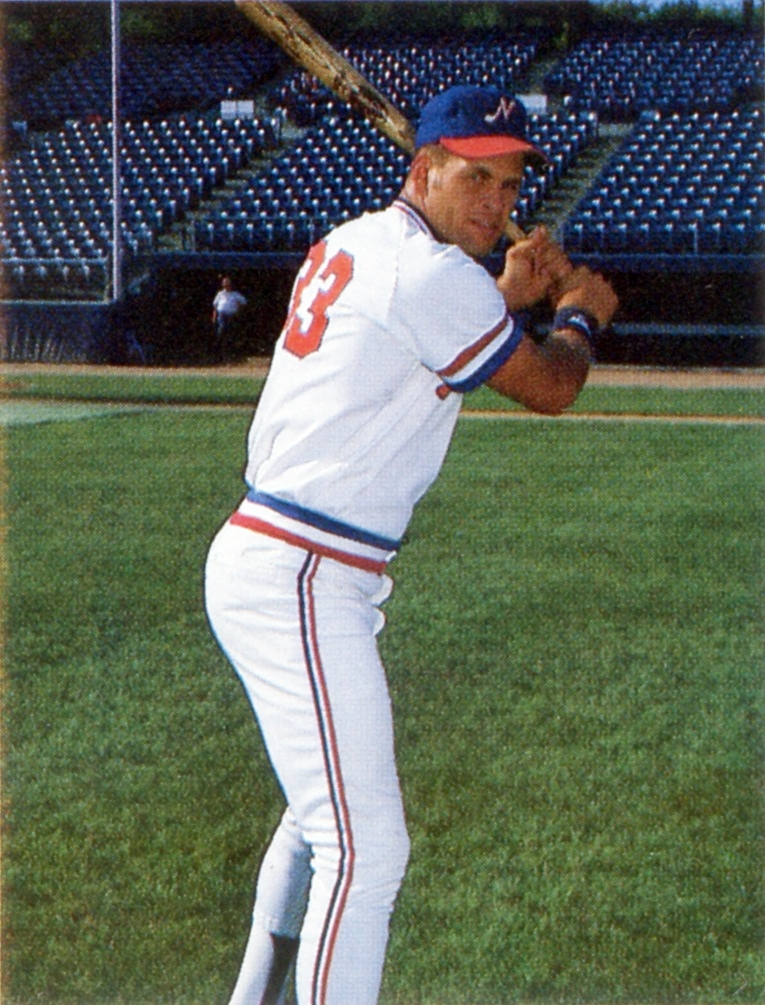
- Lowry with the Nashville Sounds in 1985
- Catcher
- Born: October 23, 1957; Lumberton, North Carolina, U.S.
- Died: July 10, 1997 (aged 39); Jamestown, New York, U.S.
- Batted: Left Threw: Right

MLB debut
- April 3, 1984, for the Detroit Tigers

Last MLB appearance
- April 23, 1988, for the Minnesota Twins

MLB statistics
- Batting average: .273
- Home runs: 5
- Runs batted in: 26
- Stats at Baseball Reference

Teams
- Detroit Tigers (1984–1987); Minnesota Twins (1988)

Dwight Lowry (October 23, 1957 – July 10, 1997), born Dwight Lowery, was an American professional baseball catcher who played in Major League Baseball for the Detroit Tigers (1984–1987) and Minnesota Twins (1988). He won a World Series championship with the 1984 Detroit Tigers.

== Early years ==
Lowry was born in Lumberton, North Carolina, in 1957. He attended Pembroke High School in Pembroke, North Carolina. He next attended the University of North Carolina earning a degree in industrial relations. He lettered in baseball with the Tar Heels in 1977, 1979, and 1980.

== Professional baseball player ==
Lowry was drafted by the Detroit Tigers in the 11th round of the 1980 Major League Baseball draft. He made his major league debut with the 1984 Detroit Tigers team that began the season with a 35–5 record, won 104 games, and beat the San Diego Padres in the World Series. As a backup for All-Star catcher Lance Parrish, Lowry appeared in 32 games for the Tigers in that season, hitting 2 home runs and driving in 7 runs while scoring 8 times. On May 20, 1984, Lowry hit his first major league home run in a 4–3 Detroit win over the Oakland Athletics. His blast was the difference in the win that extended the Tigers' record-setting start to 32–5. On September 29, Lowry hit his second home run in an 11–3 win over the New York Yankees. The game was the team's record-setting 104th victory of the season.

Lowry spent the 1985 season with the Triple-A Nashville Sounds. On July 17, 1985, he caught a no-hitter by batterymate Bryan Kelly. He returned to the Tigers for 56 games in 1986, batting .307, the second-highest on the team among players with at least 150 at bats. He appeared in 13 games in 1987, when the team again won AL Eastern division.

Lowry was released by the Tigers on October 16, 1987, and signed as a free agent with the Minnesota Twins on October 23. He had only seven at bats for the Twins and played his last major league game on April 23, 1988. On April 27, Minnesota optioned Lowry to the Triple-A Portland Beavers.

In between, Lowry played winter ball with the Leones del Caracas club of the Venezuelan League in the 1985 to 1986 season. He later won the Senior Professional Baseball Association championship with the St. Petersburg Pelicans in its 1989 inaugural season.

== Managerial career ==
After his playing career ended, Lowry became a manager in the Tigers' minor league system. He managed the Class A South Atlantic League's Fayetteville Generals for three seasons from 1994 to 1996. In 1995, he led them to a first-place finish (86–55). In 1996, the team's record dropped to 76–63, though they won the second-half division title. For his work with the Generals, Lowry was named the Detroit Tigers Player Development Man of the Year. In 1997, Lowry was assigned to manage the Jamestown Jammers of the Class A Short Season New York–Penn League.

== Family and posthumous honors ==
On July 10, 1997, Lowry died of a heart attack at age 39 after collapsing outside his home in Jamestown, New York. Lowry and his wife Pamela had two daughters (Sesilie and Amanda) and one son (Zachary).

In 1997, the Detroit Tigers renamed the Player Development Man of the Year Award as the Dwight Lowry Award in his honor. Lowry had won the award in 1996. He was inducted into the South Atlantic League Hall of Fame in 1998.
