= Mike Hazen =

American baseball executive (born 1976)

Arizona Diamondbacks
- Executive vice-president and general manager
- Born: January 7, 1976 (age 50); Weymouth, Massachusetts, U.S.
- Stats at Baseball Reference

Teams
- Boston Red Sox (2015–2016); Arizona Diamondbacks (2017–present)

Michael Norman Hazen (born January 7, 1976) is an American professional baseball executive and current executive vice president and general manager of the Arizona Diamondbacks of Major League Baseball (MLB). A Princeton University graduate and former minor league outfielder, he previously served as the GM and senior vice president of the Boston Red Sox, working under Ben Cherington.

== Playing career ==
Hazen played four years of college baseball for the Princeton Tigers and was selected in the 31st round by the San Diego Padres in the 1998 Major League Baseball draft. After batting .307 with 62 hits in the Rookie-level Pioneer League with the Idaho Falls Chukars in 1998, he was promoted to the Class A Fort Wayne Wizards of the Midwest League. He batted only .203 in 72 games in 1999, and a chronic shoulder injury ended his playing career. He was an outfielder who threw left-handed and batted right-handed.

== Baseball executive career ==
After his playing career, Hazen scouted the Cape Cod League for Peter Gammons. Gammons and Hazen's Princeton coach, Scott Bradley, recommended him to the Cleveland Indians, where he was an intern then an advance scout in 2001 and 2002. Promoted to assistant director of professional scouting in 2003, he then spent 2004 and 2005 as Cleveland's assistant director of player development, working directly under John Farrell, who would serve as manager of the Red Sox from 2013 to 2017.

Hazen joined the Boston Red Sox as director of player development in February 2006. Farrell would follow as the team's pitching coach eight months later. Hazen was promoted to vice president, player development and amateur scouting, in 2011. He was promoted to vice president and assistant general manager (GM) under Ben Cherington in 2012, then named a senior vice president and keeping his assistant GM title in early 2015. On September 23, 2015, Hazen was named GM by Red Sox president of baseball operations Dave Dombrowski. Though Dombrowski assumed final authority for baseball decisions, Hazen served as a top aide and had input in the club's decision-making. During his one full season in the post, Boston won the 2016 American League East Division championship but lost in the ALDS to the eventual league champions, the Indians.

On October 16, 2016, Hazen agreed to become the executive vice president and GM of the Arizona Diamondbacks, serving as the team's top baseball operations executive.

On June 11, 2021, Hazen announced he would be taking a physical leave of absence to spend more time with his wife Nicole, who was battling brain cancer. Hazen stated that he didn’t feel he could devote the time required to lead the team’s trade deadline and draft preparation while attending to his family responsibilities.

In October 2023, Hazen signed a contract extension with the Diamondbacks lasting until 2028. That month, the Diamondbacks won the National League pennant before losing in the World Series to the Texas Rangers.

== Personal life ==
Hazen and his wife Nicole married in 2004. She died of brain cancer on August 4, 2022. They had four sons together.

Hazen was born in Weymouth, Massachusetts, and grew up in nearby Abington.

Sporting positions
Preceded by Ben Cherington	Boston Red Sox General Manager; 2015–2016	Succeeded by Dave Dombrowski
Preceded by Dave Stewart	Arizona Diamondbacks General Manager; 2017–present	Succeeded by Incumbent
