= John Gordon (sportscaster) =

American sports broadcaster

John "Gordo" Gordon (born July 7, 1940) is an American former Major League Baseball radio broadcaster who was best known as the play by play announcer for the Minnesota Twins on the Twins Radio Network and their Metro Affiliate KSTP 1500 AM. He is well known among Twins fans for his intense emotional style of play-calling, and for his trademark call of each Twins home run: "Touch 'em all, _______!" (including the name of the player who hit the home run). This was in marked contrast to the more calm, laid-back style of his longtime broadcast partner Herb Carneal. The two would alternate between play-by-play and commentary, often switching roles midway through games.

== Career ==
Gordon was born John Gordon Gutowsky in Detroit, Michigan, and began his career in broadcasting with the class-A Spartanburg Phillies in 1965 after earning a degree from Indiana University. In 1970 he left Spartanburg to join the Baltimore Orioles' broadcast team, a job which he left in 1973 to accept a job as the head broadcaster at the University of Virginia where he called basketball and football games. In 1977 he joined the broadcast team for the New York Yankees' AAA affiliate, the Columbus Clippers, and in 1982 he moved up to the Yankees' major league broadcast crew, where he remained through 1986.

Gordon joined the Twins' broadcast crew on WCCO 830 AM as Herb Carneal's partner in 1987, which ended up being a season in which the Twins would go on to defeat the St. Louis Cardinals in the 1987 World Series. He remained with the Twins and started broadcasting alongside former Twin Dan Gladden. His longtime partner Carneal died April 1, 2007, at the age of 83 due to congestive heart failure.

Gordon announced that the 2011 season would be his last as play-by-play announcer for the Twins. The Twins held a ceremony before Gordon's last game to commemorate his years with the organization. At the end of the ceremony, Gordon's long-time broadcast partner Dan Gladden drove Gordon for a lap around the ballpark on a sidecar of a motorcycle. The Twins won Gordon's final game 1-0 on a walk-off hit by Trevor Plouffe. In 2016, he was elected to the Minnesota Twins Hall of Fame.

== Personal life ==
John has a wife, Nancy, and two grown children. They make their home in Bloomington, MN and are very active supporters of the Fellowship of Christian Athletes.

== Honors ==
Gordon was inducted into the South Atlantic League Hall of Fame for his work with the Spartanburg Phillies on June 19, 2001, and into the Pavek Museum of Broadcasting Hall of Fame in 2008.

== Filmography ==
Gordon played fictional Twins broadcaster Wally Holland in the 1994 movie Little Big League.

== See also ==
- Minnesota Twins
- Herb Carneal
