= Marvin Goldklang =

American baseball executive

- Born: 1941 or 1942 (age 83–84)
- Education: Wharton School; University of Pennsylvania Law School; New York University School of Law
- Occupations: Sports executive; Attorney
- Organization: Goldklang Group
- Military career
- Allegiance: United States
- Branch: United States Army
- Service years: 1968–1969
- Unit: 11th Special Forces Group
- Conflicts: Vietnam War

Marvin Goldklang is an American businessman. He has been a minority owner of the New York Yankees since 1979 and is the majority owner of the Charleston RiverDogs in the Carolina League. The Goldklang Group has owned and operated Minor League and Independent teams at every classification.

Goldklang grew up in Bayonne, New Jersey and played college baseball for the Penn Quakers. He holds a bachelor's degree from the Wharton School and a LL.B. from the Carey School of Law, both at the University of Pennsylvania, as well as an LL.M. from New York University.

After law school, he briefly joined a New York law firm before serving in the United States Army during the Vietnam War. After returning from the Army, he continued to practice law in New York. In 1974, he was named a partner at the firm, where his work covered corporate tax and investment banking-related matters.

In 1982, Goldklang bought a share of a minor league team in Utica, New York. In 1983, he stopped practicing law to focus on baseball. In 1989, he led investment groups that acquired controlling stakes in minor league teams in four different states. In 1991, he acquired the Erie, Pennsylvania club of the New York–Penn League and relocated them to New York's Hudson Valley where they became the Hudson Valley Renegades.

In the early 1990s, he was a leading figure in establishing the independent Northern League. He became the owner of the St. Paul Saints in that league. He later spearheaded the establishment of the independent American Association of Professional Baseball.

He also previously owned the Fort Myers Miracle, the Minnesota Twins' entry in the Class A Florida State League.

Since 2004, he has been in the South Atlantic League Hall of Fame. He was inducted in the Florida State League Hall of Fame in 2010, the New York–Penn League Hall of Fame in 2018 and was elected to the board of trustees for Minor League Baseball in 2014.
