= Goldklang Group =

Sports ownership and management group

- Industry: Professional sports
- Founded: September 1989; 36 years ago
- Founder: Marvin Goldklang
- Subsidiaries: Charleston RiverDogs; Pittsfield Suns
- Website: goldklanggroup.com

The Goldklang Group is a sports ownership and management group. Led by Marvin Goldklang, the group includes Jeff Goldklang, Bill Murray, Mike Veeck, and Tom Whaley.

The Goldklang Group owns the Charleston RiverDogs of the Carolina League and the Pittsfield Suns of the Futures Collegiate Baseball League.

They owned the Fort Myers Miracle of the Florida State League from 1990 to 2014, now known as the Fort Myers Mighty Mussels, which was the group's first MiLB team. They also owned the Hudson Valley Renegades of High-A East from 1994 to 2021, and the St. Paul Saints from 1993 to 2023.

Tyler Tumminia served as Senior Vice President of the group from 2011 to 2016.
