= Fayetteville Generals =

- 1987–1996; Fayetteville, North Carolina
Team logo
Cap insignia

Minor league affiliations
- Previous classes: Single-A (1987–1996)
- League: South Atlantic League (1987–1996)
- Division: Northern Division

Major league affiliations
- Previous teams: Detroit Tigers (1987–1996)

Team data
- Previous names: Fayetteville Generals (1987-1996)
- Mascot: Bleacher Creature (1987-1996)
- Previous parks: J. P. Riddle Stadium (1987-1996)

The Fayetteville Generals were a minor league baseball team located in Fayetteville, North Carolina.

The last minor league baseball team to play before the Generals were the Fayetteville Highlanders of the Carolina League, they ceased play after the 1956 season.

In 1986, Charles Padgett, Don Koonce and Jimmy O. Bunce paid $500,000 for the franchise. The team struggled financially until the 1989 season and posted several positive years financially and with attendance through the early 1990s.

The team was featured in the classic 1988 baseball film Bull Durham.

They were part of the South Atlantic League between 1986 and 1996. They were affiliated with the Detroit Tigers throughout their entire existence. Prior to the 1997 season, the Generals were renamed the Cape Fear Crocs.

In 1996, playing with the Generals, Gabe Kapler led the South Atlantic League in hits, doubles, and triples (45; 2nd in the minor leagues), extra-base hits (71), and total bases (280).

== Year-by-year record ==
Year	Record	Finish	Manager	Playoffs
1987	65–74	9th	Johnny Lipon	
1988	62–73	10th	Leon Roberts	
1989	70–69	6th	Gene Roof	
1990	82–61	2nd (t)	Gene Roof	Lost in 1st round
1991	58–79	13th	Gerry Groninger	
1992	74–67	5th	Gerry Groninger	
1993	75–66	5th	Mark Wagner	Lost in 1st round
1994	62–75	10th	Dwight Lowry	
1995	86–55	1st	Dwight Lowry	
1996	76–63	5th	Dwight Lowry	Lost in 1st round

== Notable former players ==
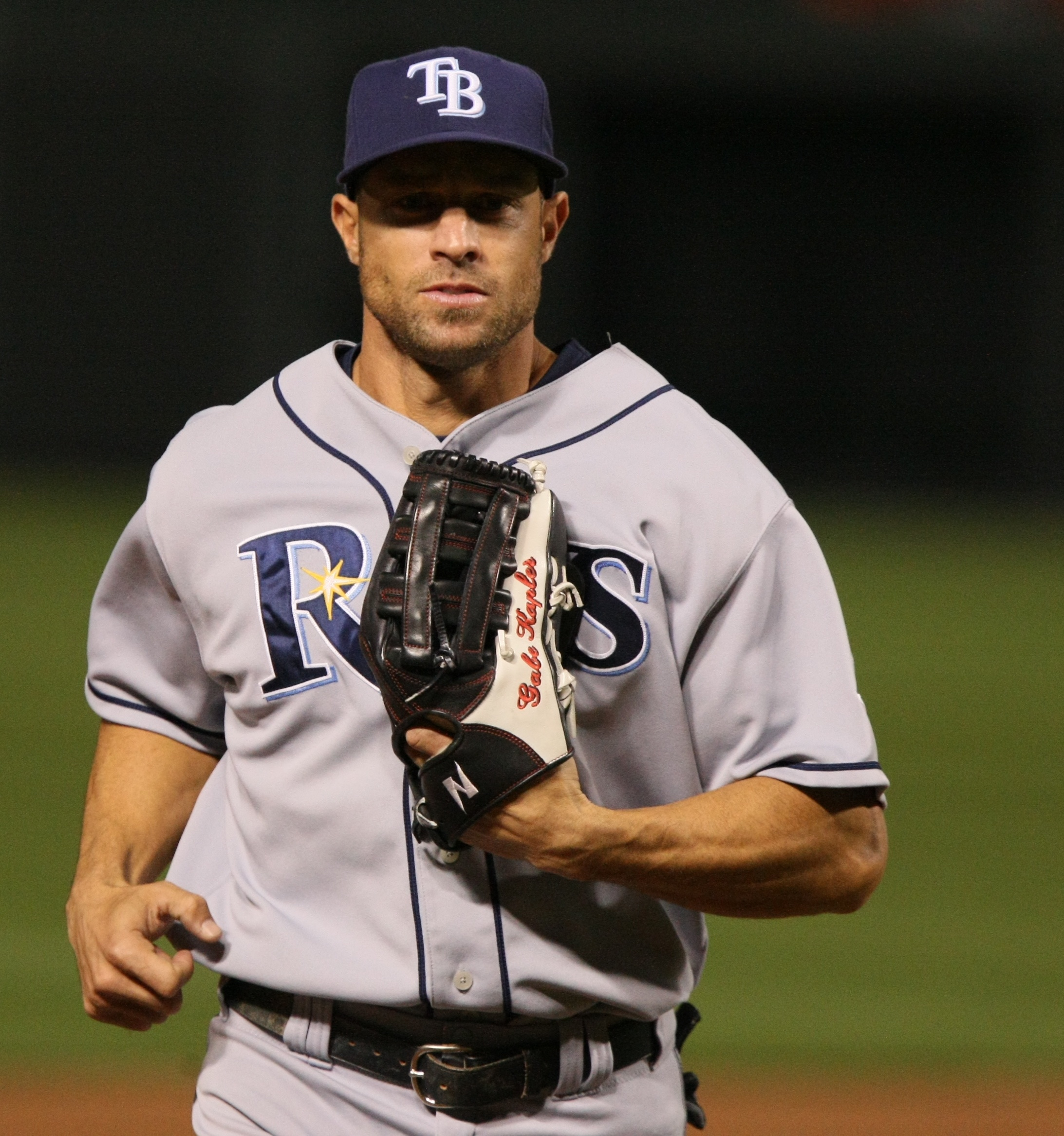
Gabe Kapler

- Gabe Kapler, outfielder
- Travis Fryman, infielder
- Frank Catalanotto, infielder
- Juan Encarnación, outfielder
