= Fayetteville Technical Community College =

College in Fayetteville, North Carolina, US

Coordinates: 35.0695°N 78.9272°W

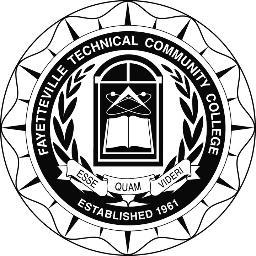
- Motto: Education for Life
- Type: Public community college
- Established: 1961
- Parent institution: North Carolina Community College System
- President: Mark Sorrells
- Faculty: 328 Full-time and 439 Part-time (Spring 2022)
- Students: 10,932 (Spring 2022)
- Location: Fayetteville, North Carolina, U.S.
- Colors: Black and gold
- Nickname: Trojans
- Website: www.faytechcc.edu

Fayetteville Technical Community College (FTCC or, informally, Fay Tech) is a public community college in Fayetteville, North Carolina. It is accredited by the Southern Association of Colleges and Schools Commission on Colleges (SACSCOC) and a member of the North Carolina Community College System. FTCC serves more than 30,000 students annually by providing over 190 occupational, technical, general education, college transfer, and continuing education programs. The third-largest community college in the state, and the largest in Eastern North Carolina, FTCC boasts one of the largest Continuing Education departments. Located adjacent to Fort Bragg, the college has provided education to the military since 1961.

== History ==
Led by John Standridge in 1961, the Fayetteville Area Industrial Education Center (IEC) was created to provide job training and educational opportunities to high school graduates and adult learners in Cumberland County and the surrounding areas including: Bladen, Harnett, Hoke, Robeson, Sampson and Scotland counties, as well as Fort Bragg and Pope Air Force Base.

After the North Carolina General Assembly passed a bill creating the statewide Community College System in 1963, Fayetteville Area IEC officially became Fayetteville Technical Institute (FTI) that July. Mr. Howard Boudreau was the first president of the institution. Accreditation was first received by the Southern Association of Colleges and Schools Commission on Colleges (SACSCOC) in 1967. Through encouragement by the North Carolina Department of Community Colleges and the North Carolina General Assembly, FTI became Fayetteville Technical Community College in January 1988. The purpose of the name change was to broaden and enhance the public image of technical and vocational postsecondary education and job training opportunities to new and expanding industries.

Fayetteville Tech celebrated its 50th anniversary in 2011 under the leadership of its former President, Dr. Larry Keen.

== Academics ==
FTCC offers associate degrees, diplomas, certificates, and continuing education programs.

== Athletics ==
The college will have men's and women's basketball and golf teams beginning in the 2016–2017 season. According to the Fayetteville Observer "Fayetteville Tech would probably compete in the National Junior College Athletic Association's Division II because there are more potential opponents in the Carolinas and Virginia...The teams would be known as Trojans, the school's mascot...FTCC would likely add other sports teams later, though [President Larry] Keen said football would not ever be an option because of its expense."

Also, according to the Observer, "'The basketball teams would practice in the school's gym but it's 7 feet too small for regulation games. As a result, the teams would likely play their 15 home games at a Crown Center venue,' said David Brand, the school's senior vice president for academic and student services.

He said the school would contract with a local golf course to serve as the home course for the golf teams."

== Campuses ==
=== Fayetteville Campus (Fayetteville, NC) ===
The Fayetteville campus consists of 17 buildings across 150 acres including the Tony Rand Student Center, the Bookstore, the Advanced Technology Building, the All American Veterans Center, the Paul H. Thompson Library, the Center for Business and Industry, the Gym, the Health Technologies Center, the Auto Body Shop Complex, Lafayette Hall, the Harry F. Shaw Virtual Campus Center, the General Classroom Building, a line worker training area, a solar farm training area currently under construction, and the Salon and Spa Services Educational Center. A new Building Trades center is expected to open in late 2025. As the school grew over the years and developed increasingly successful offerings, it has expanded dramatically including Junior high school facilities now known as Horace Sisk Building, the YMCA building, former car dealerships, and more. The campus is located along Route 14 of the Fayetteville Area System of Transit at 2201 Hull Rd, Fayetteville, NC 28303.

=== Spring Lake Campus ===
The Spring Lake Campus specializes in Basic Law Enforcement Training, the Pre-Health Academy, and Continuing Education certifications including: Certified Nursing Assistant, Registered Medical Assistant, Emergency Medical Services, Phlebotomy, and Welding. It is located at 171 Laketree Blvd, Spring Lake, NC 28390.

=== Fort Bragg Campus ===
The FTCC Fort Bragg Center provides counseling, registration, and testing services for the convenience of military personnel and their families, and associate degree programs based on military occupational specialty. It is located on Fort Bragg in the Bragg Training and Education Center at 4520 Knox Street F Wing, Bldg 1–3571, Fort Bragg, North Carolina 28310.

=== Dr. J Larry Keen Regional Fire and Emergency Training Campus ===
The FTCC Fire and Emergency Training Campus provides technical training for first responders on a 30 acre area. As of 2025 it includes a 4 story rescue training tower, a 4 story "burn building" which uses live fire, a confined space training facility, a grain bin and farm rescue area, and an indoor Swift Water Rescue training facility. Future plans include two more burn buildings and an aircraft fire simulator. The Swift Water Rescue training facility is a priority following numerous hurricanes in the area and holds over 140,000 gallons of water. It allows for 7 knot currents and can hold multiple submerged vehicles for first responders to practice water rescues. It can replicate inclement weather including lightning, thunder, rain, police sirens, and lights to enhance realism. It is located at 775 Tom Starling Road, Fayetteville, North Carolina 28306.

=== Collision Repair & Refinishing Technology Center ===
2821 Procurement Circle, Fayetteville, North Carolina 28303

=== Horticulture Education Center ===
The FTCC Horticulture Education Center is located adjacent to the Cape Fear Botanical Gardens and provides training for Horticulture related careers. 670 North Eastern Blvd Fayetteville, North Carolina 28301

=== Regional Supply Chain Management & Logistics Center ===
FTCC broke ground for a new 58 acre campus on September 15, 2025. Phase one includes a 13 acre pad for training 14 CDL truck drivers at once and is expected to open in December, 2025. FTCC partnered with Bladen Community College and Robeson Community College on the campus. 7304 Old Raeford Road, Fayetteville, North Carolina 28304
