= Ben Cherington =

American professional baseball executive

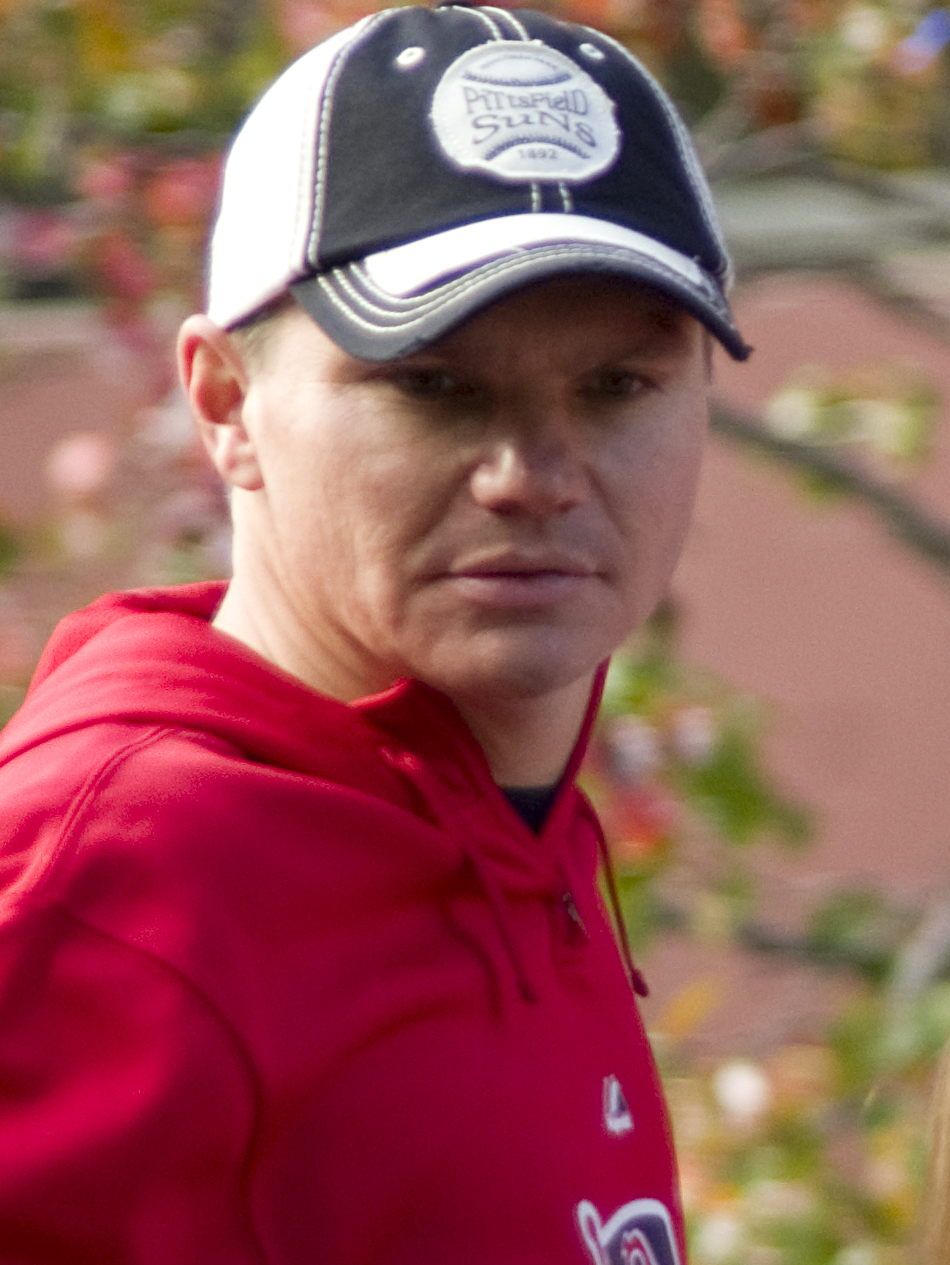
- Cherington during the Red Sox; 2013 World Series victory parade

Pittsburgh Pirates
- General Manager
- Born: July 14, 1974 (age 52); Meriden, New Hampshire, U.S.

Teams
- Cleveland Indians (1998); Boston Red Sox (1999–2015); Toronto Blue Jays (2016–2019); Pittsburgh Pirates (2019–present)

Career highlights and awards
- 3x World Series champion (2004, 2007, 2013); 2013 Sporting News Executive of the Year

Benjamin P. Cherington (born July 14, 1974) is an American baseball executive serving as the general manager of the Pittsburgh Pirates of Major League Baseball (MLB) since November 2019. He previously served as the vice-president of baseball operations for the Toronto Blue Jays, and was the executive vice president and general manager of the Boston Red Sox from 2011 to 2015. He succeeded Theo Epstein in that position, having worked in the team's baseball operations office since 1999, before Epstein's arrival.

== Early life ==
Born in Meriden, New Hampshire, Cherington is the grandson of former Dartmouth College professor Richard Eberhart, a poet who won the Pulitzer Prize. Cherington graduated from Lebanon High School, where he was a pitcher on the varsity baseball team and played varsity ice hockey for Coach Richard Bolduc. He matriculated at Amherst College, where he played college baseball for the Amherst Mammoths and was a member of the Gamma chapter of Psi Upsilon fraternity, and has a master's degree in Sport Management from the University of Massachusetts Amherst.

== Professional career ==
=== Boston Red Sox ===
Cherington served Boston as an area scout, baseball operations assistant, coordinator of international scouting, and assistant director (and then director) of player development from 1999 to 2005. He was originally hired by the Red Sox in 1999 by Dan Duquette, an Amherst College alumnus who was then the club's general manager, after Cherington spent the previous season as an advance scout for the Cleveland Indians.

From December 12, 2005, through January 19, 2006, he served as the Red Sox' co-general manager with Jed Hoyer during Epstein's absence from the team, with club president/CEO Larry Lucchino and veteran former Major League GM Bill Lajoie also playing key roles during that period. After Epstein's return, Cherington became vice president, player personnel, through January 2009, then senior vice president and assistant GM from 2009 through his promotion to general manager after the 2011 season.

Cherington inherited a team that had tumbled out of contention for a division championship or wild card postseason appearance with a disastrous, 7–20 record during September 2011. The slide cost eight-year manager Terry Francona his job and occurred as Epstein was negotiating to join the Chicago Cubs as their president of baseball operations. Cherington's first major assignment after succeeding Epstein was to find a successor to Francona, but his final candidates were rejected by Boston's ownership and CEO Lucchino in favor of former Texas Rangers and New York Mets manager Bobby Valentine — out of the Majors since 2002, although he had managed the Chiba Lotte Marines of Nippon Professional Baseball and served as a television analyst on ESPN since.

Valentine's 2012 roster included many veterans of the 2011 Red Sox, and he clashed with his players, his holdover coaches, and the media. The team suffered from injuries to key players, struggled out of the gate, improved to a high-water mark of 41–36 (.532) on June 29, but then began to fall back in the standings. When it became clear that the Red Sox would not contend as constituted, Cherington and the team's ownership initiated a trade with the Los Angeles Dodgers on August 25, sending pitcher Josh Beckett, outfielder Carl Crawford and first baseman Adrián González — all on expensive, multiyear contracts — to the Dodgers and clearing $262.5 million in salary obligations. Stripped of veteran talent, the 2012 Red Sox went only 9–26 over the final 35 games of the season and finished with their worst record since 1965. Valentine was fired one day after the season ended October 3.

Cherington then set out to rebuild the team for 2013. He hired John Farrell as his manager, acquiring Farrell's rights in an October 21 trade with the Toronto Blue Jays. He signed seven key free agents — David Ross, Jonny Gomes, Stephen Drew, Mike Napoli, Shane Victorino, Koji Uehara and Ryan Dempster — none of whom required sacrificing a draft pick. Although a midwinter trade for relief pitcher Joel Hanrahan was ruined by Hanrahan's season-ending elbow injury in May, Cherington obtained a useful bench player, Mike Carp, in a preseason trade. Then, on July 30, he engineered a three-team transaction that brought starting pitcher Jake Peavy to Boston.

Farrell, the free agents, Carp and Peavy, as well as a return to health of core players such as David Ortiz, Jacoby Ellsbury and John Lackey, all contributed to Boston's successful 2013 season. The club improved by 28 games, rising from last place in the American League East Division in 2012 to the division championship, 97 regular-season victories (tied for the most in Major League Baseball), the 2013 American League pennant, and the 2013 World Series championship.

During that offseason, Boston failed to re-sign free agents Ellsbury and Jarrod Saltalamacchia. The 2014 Red Sox, struggling to score runs, fell back to last place in the AL East, losing 26 games from their previous year's standard with a 71–91 record, 25 games behind the division champion Baltimore Orioles. On July 31, with Boston out of the race, Cherington traded starting pitchers Lackey and Jon Lester to contending teams (Peavy had been traded July 26), then retooled the roster during the 2014–15 offseason, adding high-ticket free agents Pablo Sandoval and Hanley Ramírez and trading for starting pitchers Wade Miley and Rick Porcello.

After a promising 12–10 April start to their 2015 season, the Red Sox slumped to a 9–19 May record (scoring the fewest runs in the Major Leagues), and had a horrendous eight-game losing streak after the All-Star break. Porcello, Ramírez and Sandoval performed poorly, the latter two struggling with injuries and illness.

On August 1, with the Red Sox again mired in last place at 47–58, Lucchino announced his intention to retire as president/CEO at the end of the season. Seventeen days later, the Red Sox named veteran MLB executive Dave Dombrowski to the new position of president, baseball operations, to oversee Cherington and the on-field side of the Boston organization. Cherington then turned in his resignation, declining the club's request that he remain as the team's general manager. By that time, only one of the 2013 free agents, injured closer Uehara, remained on the Red Sox' roster. However, Cherington left behind a group of young players (Xander Bogaerts, Mookie Betts, Brock Holt, Eduardo Rodríguez, Blake Swihart, Travis Shaw, Henry Owens, Christian Vázquez, and others) as a potential core of their 2016 team. Much of this core that Cherington acquired contributed heavily to the Red Sox's 2018 championship. Five weeks later, Mike Hazen, one of Cherington's assistants, was named his successor.

Although Cherington's name was mentioned as a possible candidate for open general manager posts in MLB, he decided to join Columbia University's Sports Management faculty for the 2015–16 academic year to teach a course in "leadership in sports" during the spring 2016 semester.

=== Toronto Blue Jays ===
On September 14, 2016, Cherington was hired by the Toronto Blue Jays to be their vice-president of baseball operations.

=== Pittsburgh Pirates ===
On November 18, 2019, Cherington was officially announced as the Pittsburgh Pirates general manager.

== Awards ==
Cherington was named Major League Baseball Executive of the Year for 2013 by The Sporting News for his efforts. He was only the third Red Sox executive to win the award since its origination in 1936, following longtime owner Tom Yawkey (1946) and late general manager Dick O'Connell (1967; 1975).

== Personal life ==
On April 6, 2012, Cherington married then-marketing executive Tyler Tumminia in a ceremony at Brooklyn Borough Hall. Tumminia was formerly the interim commissioner of the Premier Hockey Federation, prior to the league’s cessation. The couple has two daughters. Cherington was previously married to ESPN reporter Wendi Nix.

Preceded by Theo Epstein; Theo Epstein	Boston Red Sox General Manager; 2005–2006; 2012–2015	Succeeded by Theo Epstein; Mike Hazen
