= Fletcher B. Cherington =

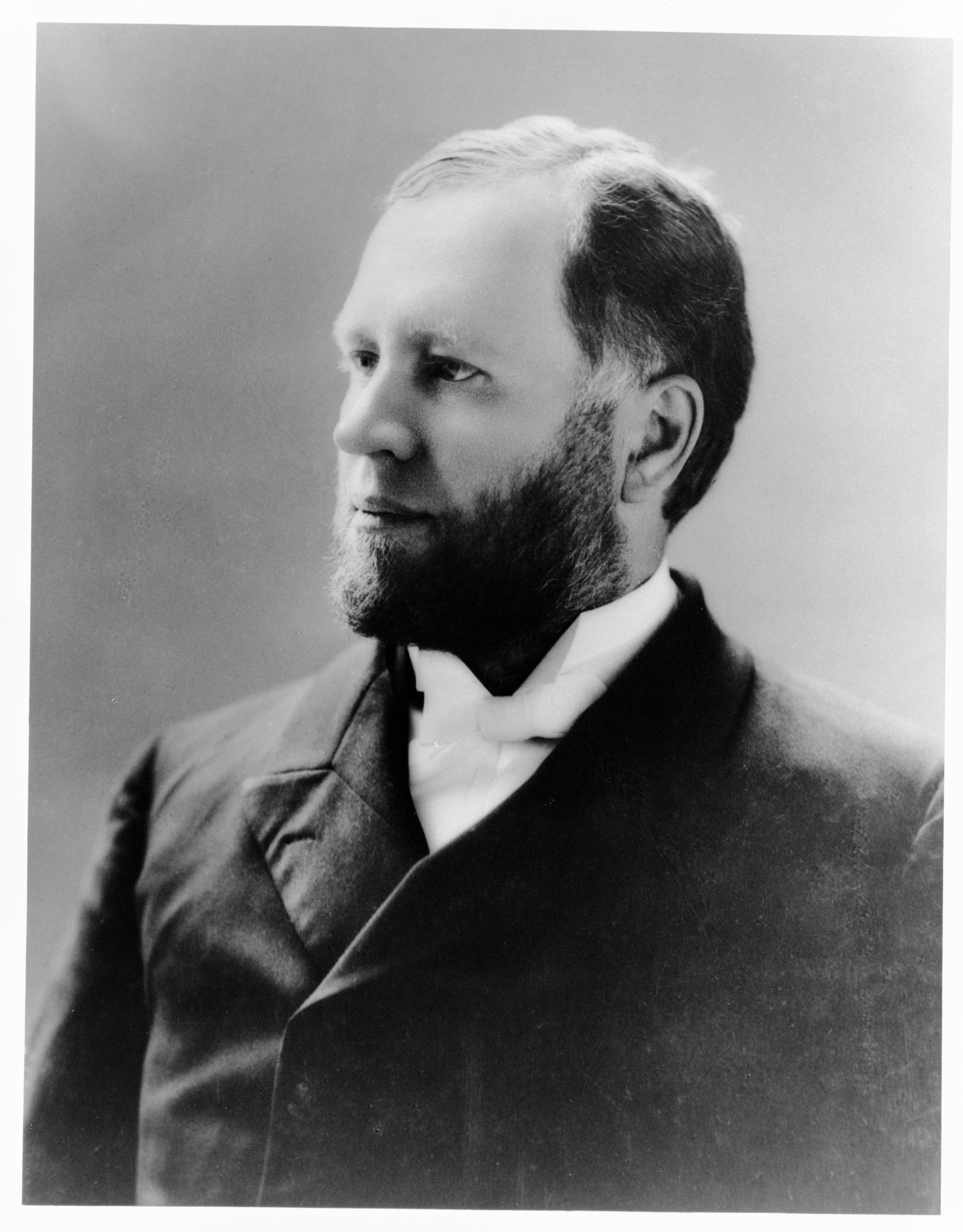
Portrait of Fletcher B Cherington

Fletcher B. Cherington (1850-1908) was an American Methodist reverend during the late 19th-early 20th century. Cherington was born in Ohio in 1850, and died in Pasadena, Ca in November 1908 at the age of 58.

== Career ==
Rev. Cherington served as the first president of the College of Puget Sound (now the University of Puget Sound) in Tacoma, Washington from 1890–1892. After leaving the college, he served as a minister in Southern California for 16 years. He retired about a year before his death due to his failing health.

In 1900, Cherington published a series of sermons he gave in San Francisco, Ca, entitled Siftings; excerpts from sermons preached in Plymouth Congregational Church, San Francisco, California. The publication was only published in limited quantity by the Young People's Society of Christian Endeavour of Plymouth Congregational Church, in San Francisco.
