= Hudson Valley Renegades =

- Founded in 1994; Fishkill, New York

| Team logo | Cap insignia |

Minor league affiliations
- Class: High-A (2021–present)
- Previous classes: Class A Short Season (1994–2020)
- League: South Atlantic League (2021–present)
- Division: North Division
- Previous leagues: New York–Penn League (1994–2020)

Major league affiliations
- Team: New York Yankees (2021–present)
- Previous teams: Tampa Bay Rays (1996–2020); Texas Rangers (1994–1995)

Minor league titles
- League titles (3): 1999; 2012; 2017
- Division titles (8): 1998; 1999; 2012; 2014; 2018; 2021; 2023; 2024
- First-half titles (1): 2023
- Second-half titles (1): 2024

Team data
- Name: Hudson Valley Renegades
- Colors: Midnight navy, gray, white, dutchess blue
- Mascots: Rookie, Rene, Rascal, Roofus, Rosie
- Ballpark: Heritage Financial Park (1994–present)
- Owner/ Operator: Diamond Baseball Holdings
- General manager: Tom Denlinger (since 2025)
- Manager: Aaron Bossi
- Website: milb.com/hudson-valley

The Hudson Valley Renegades are a Minor League Baseball team based in Fishkill, New York. The High-A affiliate of the New York Yankees, the Renegades play in the South Atlantic League. The Renegades play their home games at Heritage Financial Park. From 1994 to 2020, the team competed in the Class A Short Season New York–Penn League.

== History ==
The Renegades began play in 1994 when the Erie Sailors relocated from Pennsylvania to the Hudson Valley, rebranding as the Hudson Valley Renegades. The name was chosen from four finalists in a name-the-team contest, beating out Vipers, Venom, and Hawks. The team originally retained the Sailors' existing affiliation with the Texas Rangers organization but became an affiliate of the Tampa Bay Rays organization in 1996, even though the major league team would not start playing until 1998. The Renegades became an affiliate club of the New York Yankees in 2021.

=== New York-Penn League ===
The Renegades won three New York–Penn League championships in 1999, 2012, and 2017. The team has had a number of future major leaguers such as Scott Podsednik, Jorge Cantu, Ryan Dempster, Joe Kennedy, Craig Monroe, Matt Diaz, Evan Longoria, Josh Hamilton, John Jaso, Wade Davis, and Toby Hall as players.

On August 10, 2000, Doug Waechter threw the first no-hitter in Renegades history against the Pittsfield Mets.A second no-hitter was thrown in July 2021 and a third in July 2024.

In October 2005, Scott Podsednik became the first former Renegade to win a World Series with the Chicago White Sox defeating a Houston Astros club which included former Renegades Brandon Backe and Dan Wheeler.

=== High-A East/South Atlantic League ===
In conjunction with Major League Baseball's restructuring of Minor League Baseball in 2021, the Renegades were placed into the High-A East. They won the 2021 Northern Division title with a first-place 71–49 record. Despite winning the division, their record was third-best in the league, and only the two teams with the highest winning percentages in the regular season competed for the league championship.

In 2022, the High-A East became known as the South Atlantic League, the name historically used by the regional circuit prior to the 2021 reorganization.

=== Ownership ===
The original owner of the team was the Goldklang Group headed by Marvin Goldklang, which also had stakes in several other minor league baseball teams, including the Charleston RiverDogs and St. Paul Saints. In December 2021, it was announced that The Goldklang Group sold the Renegades to Diamond Baseball Holdings, which as of 2023 is owned by Silver Lake, an American global private equity firm.

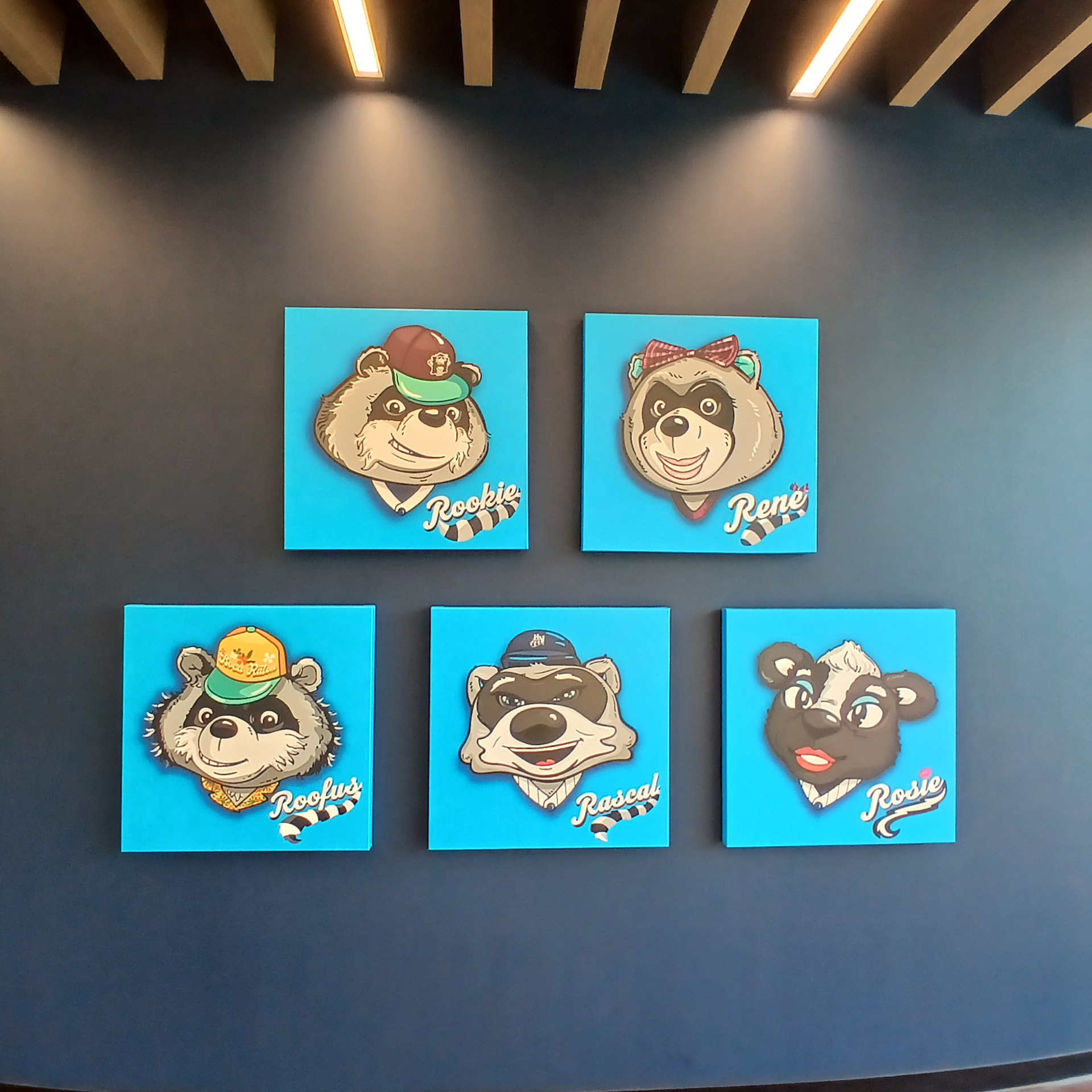
Mascots of the Hudson Valley Renegades as depicted in 2026

=== Mascots ===
The team's mascots are a family of anthropomorphic raccoons. Rookie the Raccoon appeared first and Rene Gade in late 1995. The pair was married "in an on-field ceremony" on July 20, 1997. Occasionally, Rookie's father Roofus also appears as part of the mascot team. Their raccoon mascot son Rascal was born in 2000, who married a skunk named Rosie on July 20, 2024.

In December 2023, the mascots participated in a holiday yule log event.

=== Other notable history ===
On August 1, 1995, public address announcer Rick Zolzer was ejected from a game for criticizing the calls of the field umpire over the public address system.

== Roster ==
Hudson Valley Renegades roster
| Players | | Coaches/Other |
|---|---|---|
| Pitchers: 31 Thomas Balboni Jr.; 27 Brandon Decker; 35 Allen Facundo; 25 Danny Flatt; 8 Franyer Herrera; 20 Pico Kohn; 4 Andrew Landry; 0 Sean Paul Liñan; 36 Hansel Rincon; 17 Jose M. Rodriguez; 26 Wilmy Sanchez; 19 Luis Serna; 29 Jack Sokol; 17 Luis Velasquez; 43 Bryce Warrecker | Catchers: 13 Eric Genther; 3 Josue Gonzalez; 23 Diomedes Hernandez; 11 David McCann; Infielders: 18 Jackson Lovich; 1 Bryce Martin-Grudzielanek; 6 Hans Montero; 7 Enmanuel Tejeda; 39 Kyle West; Outfielders: 2 Robbie Burnett; 12 Gabriel Lara; 22 Willy Montero; 9 Maika Niu; 14 Wilson Rodriguez; 28 Dean Toigo; 15 Camden Troyer; 24 Tyler Wilson | Manager: 93 Aaron Bossi; Coaches: 5 Chase Gerbrick (defensive); 44 Scott Nestor (hitting); 41 Ryan Mossman (pitching); 7-day injured list; * On New York Yankees 40-man roster; ~ Development list; # Rehab assignment; ∞ Reserve list; ‡ Restricted list; § Suspended list; † Temporarily inactive list; Roster updated November 2, 2026; Transactions; → More rosters: MiLB • South Atlantic League; → New York Yankees minor league players |

== Playoffs ==
- 1995 season: Lost to Vermont 2-0 in semifinals.
- 1998 season: Lost to Oneonta 2-0 in semifinals.
- 1999 season: Defeated Utica 2-1 in semifinals; defeated Mahoning Valley 2-1 to win championship.
- 2012 season: Defeated Brooklyn 2-1 in semifinals; defeated Tri-City 2-1 to win championship.
- 2014 season: Lost to State College 2-1 in semifinals.
- 2016 season: Defeated Lowell 2-0 in semifinals; lost to State College 2-0 in finals.
- 2017 season: Defeated Staten Island 2-1 in semifinals; defeated Vermont 2-0 to win championship.
- 2018 season: Defeated Auburn Doubledays 2-0 in semifinals; lost to Tri-City ValleyCats 2-0 in finals.
- 2019 season: Lost to Brooklyn 2-1 in semifinals.
- 2023 season: Defeated Jersey Shore 2-1 in semifinals; lost to Greenville 2-0 in finals.
- 2024 season: Defeated Greensboro 2-1 in semifinals; lost to Bowling Green 2-1 in finals.
