= 2022 College World Series =

2022 College World Series may refer to:

- 2022 Men's College World Series, the final stage of the 2022 NCAA Division I baseball tournament
- 2022 Women's College World Series, the final stage of the 2022 NCAA Division I softball tournament
