= 2022 NCAA Division I baseball rankings =

2022 NCAA Division I baseball season
- Duration: February 18, 2022 – June 26, 2022
- Number of teams: 300
- Preseason No. 1: Texas (Unanimous)

Tournament
- Duration: June 4–26, 2022
- Most conference bids: ACC & SEC (9)

College World Series
- Champions: Ole Miss (1st title)
- Runners-up: Oklahoma (3rd CWS Appearance)
- Winning Coach: Mike Bianco (1st title)
- MOP: Dylan DeLucia, Ole Miss

Seasons
- ← 2021 2023 →

The following human polls make up the 2022 NCAA Division I men's baseball rankings. The USA Today/ESPN Coaches Poll is voted on by a panel of 31 Division I baseball coaches. The Baseball America poll is voted on by staff members of the Baseball America magazine. These polls, along with the Perfect Game USA poll, rank the top 25 teams nationally. Collegiate Baseball and the National Collegiate Baseball Writers Association rank the top 30 teams nationally.

== Legend ==
	Increase in ranking
	Decrease in ranking
	Not ranked previous week
Italics	Number of first place votes
(#–#)	Win–loss record
т	Tied with team above or below also with this symbol

== ESPN/USA Today Coaches Poll ==
	Preseason Feb 3	Week 2 Feb 28	Week 3 Mar 7	Week 4 Mar 14	Week 5 Mar 21	Week 6 Mar 28	Week 7 Apr 4	Week 8 Apr 11	Week 9 Apr 18	Week 10 Apr 25	Week 11 May 2	Week 12 May 9	Week 13 May 16	Week 14 May 23	Week 15 May 30	Final Jun 27	
1.	Texas (14)	Texas (8–0) (31)	Texas (11–1) (30)	Ole Miss (13–2) (19)	Vanderbilt (17–2) (6)	Tennessee (23–1) (30)	Tennessee (27–1) (31)	Tennessee (31–1) (31)	Tennessee (33–3) (30)	Tennessee (37–3) (31)	Tennessee (40–4) (31)	Tennessee (42–6) (26)	Tennessee (45–7) (30)	Tennessee (49–7) (31)	Tennessee (53–7) (31)	Ole Miss (42–23) (31)	1.
2.	Vanderbilt (7)	Ole Miss (6–0)	Vanderbilt (10–2)	Texas (13–4)	Ole Miss (15–4) (9)	Arkansas (18–4)	Arkansas (21–5)	Oregon State (24–7)	Oregon State (27–7) (1)	Oregon State (31–8)	Oregon State (34–9)	Oregon State (38–9) (4)	Oregon State (40–11) (1)	Virginia Tech (40–11)	Oregon State (44–15)	Oklahoma (45–24)	2.
3.	Mississippi State (5)	Stanford (6–1)	Ole Miss (10–1)	Vanderbilt (13–2) (5)	Texas (17–5) (3)	Virginia (22–2) (1)	Virginia (25–3)	Miami (FL) (26–6)	Arkansas (28–7)	Miami (FL) (31–9)	Arkansas (34–10)	Oklahoma State (34–13)	Virginia Tech (36–11)	Oregon State (41–13)	Virginia Tech (41–12)	Arkansas (46–21)	3.
4.	Arkansas (4)	NC State (8–0)	Tennessee (10–1)	Arkansas (11–3) (1)	Arkansas (16–3) (5)	Oregon State (17–5)	Texas Tech (24–6)	Texas Tech (27–8)	Oklahoma State (26–10)	Arkansas (31–9)	Oklahoma State (31–13)	Arkansas (36–12)	Stanford (33–14)	Stanford (37–14)	Stanford (41–14)	Texas A&M (44–20)	4.
5.	Stanford	Vanderbilt (5–2)	Stanford (8–3)	Tennessee (15–1) (4)	Tennessee (19–1) (8)	Vanderbilt (19–4)	Oregon State (20–7)	Arkansas (23–7)	Miami (FL) (28–8)	Southern Miss (32–8)	Miami (FL) (32–12)	Miami (FL) (35–12)	Arkansas (37–14)	Miami (FL) (39–16)	Oklahoma State (39–20)	Notre Dame (41–17)	5.
6.	Ole Miss	Arkansas (4–2)	Oregon State (9–1)	Oregon State (11–2)	Oregon State (14–4)	Texas Tech (20–5)	Texas (21–9)	Oklahoma State (23–9)	Southern Miss (27–8)	Texas (30–13)	Virginia Tech (31–10)	Virginia Tech (33–10)	Miami (FL) (37–14)	Louisville (38–16–1)	Miami (FL) (39–18)	Stanford (47–18)	6.
7.	LSU (1)	LSU (7–1)	Arkansas (7–3)	Notre Dame (11–1)	Florida (15–5)	Florida State (16–7)	Oklahoma State (20–8)	Texas (24–10)	Texas (26–12)	Oklahoma State (27–13)	Southern Miss (34–10)	Stanford (29–14)	Texas Tech (35–16)	Oklahoma State (36–18)	Texas A&M (37–18)	Auburn (43–22)	7.
8.	Oklahoma State	Oklahoma State (4–2)	Notre Dame (8–1)	LSU (13–3)	Virginia (19–1)	Texas (19–7)	Ole Miss (19–8)	Virginia (26–6)	Texas Tech (27–12)	Virginia (31–10)	UCLA (30–13)	Louisville (33–13)	Oklahoma State (34–17)	Maryland (44–10)	Maryland (45–12)	Texas (47–22)	8.
9.	NC State	Oregon State (7–0)	LSU (9–3)	Florida (13–4)	Arizona (15–4)	Oklahoma State (18–6)	Arizona (21–7)	Notre Dame (20–5)	Virginia (27–9)	Stanford (24–12)	Virginia (33–12)	Virginia (34–12)	Louisville (35–15)	Texas A&M (35–17)	Louisville (38–18–1)	Tennessee (57–9)	9.
10.	Florida	Arizona (7–1)	Florida (10–3)	Georgia Tech (13–3)	Florida State (13–6)	Ole Miss (16–7)	Georgia (22–6)	Georgia (24–8)	Georgia (26–10)	Virginia Tech (28–9)	Louisville (31–12)	UConn (40–8)	Virginia (37–13)	Arkansas (38–16)	Southern Miss (43–16)	Oregon State (48–18)	10.
11.	Notre Dame	Tennessee (7–0)	Texas Tech (10–2)	Stanford (9–5)	Texas Tech (17–4)	TCU (18–5)	Miami (FL) (21–6)	Louisville (23–8)	Gonzaga (23–9)	Georgia (28–12)	Stanford (25–14)	Southern Miss (36–12)	Texas A&M (33–16)	Texas Tech (36–18)	Notre Dame (35–14)	Virginia Tech (45–14)	11.
12.	Texas Tech	Notre Dame (5–1)	Oklahoma State (6–4)	Florida State (10–5)	North Carolina (17–3)	LSU (17–7)	Vanderbilt (20–7)	LSU (23–9)	Stanford (20–11)	Notre Dame (26–8)	Texas Tech (31–16)	Gonzaga (29–13)	Gonzaga (32–13)	Southern Miss (41–14)	Texas (42–19)	East Carolina (46–21)	12.
13.	East Carolina	Georgia (7–0)	Georgia Tech (10–2)	Texas Tech (14–3)	Oklahoma State (14–6)	Florida (17–7)	Notre Dame (16–5)	UCLA (22–9)	Virginia Tech (23–9)	Texas Tech (29–14)	UConn (37–8)	Texas Tech (32–16)	Notre Dame (31–11)	Virginia (38–15)	Arkansas (38–18)	Southern Miss (47–19)	13.
14.	Florida State	TCU (6–1)	Arizona (9–3)	Liberty (12–2)	Georgia (16–4)	Louisville (19–5)	Louisville (21–7)	Southern Miss (23–8)	UCLA (24–11)	UCLA (27–12)	Notre Dame (28–10)	Notre Dame (28–10)	Maryland (41–10)	Texas State (44–11)	Texas State (45–12)	Louisville (42–21)	14.
15.	Arizona	Mississippi State (4–3)	Georgia (9–2)	Oklahoma State (9–6)	Notre Dame (12–4)	Arizona (17–7)	Texas State (23–6)	Gonzaga (21–8)	Notre Dame (21–8)	Gonzaga (26–11)	Gonzaga (28–13)	LSU (32–15)	UConn (42–10)	Gonzaga (34–15)	Texas Tech (37–20)	North Carolina (42–22)	15.
16.	Tennessee	Florida (6–2)	Liberty (10–1)	Arizona (12–4)	Georgia Tech (15–5)	Notre Dame (12–5)	LSU (19–9)	Arizona (22–10)	UConn (28–7)	UConn (32–8)	Georgia (31–14)	Texas A&M (30–16)	Southern Miss (38–14)	Notre Dame (33–13)	North Carolina (38–19)	UConn (50–16)	16.
17.	Georgia	Florida State (5–2)	Florida State (7–4)	Virginia (14–1)	Liberty (14–4)	Georgia (18–6)	UCLA (19–8)	Vanderbilt (22–9)т	Texas State (28–9)	Louisville (27–12)	Maryland (35–9)	Maryland (37–10)	Texas State (41–11)	Texas (39–17)	East Carolina (42–18)	Oklahoma State (42–22)	17.
18.	TCU	Texas Tech (5–2)	North Carolina (11–1)	North Carolina (14–2)	LSU (15–5)	North Carolina (18–6)	Gonzaga (18–7)	Florida (22–11)т	Louisville (24–11)	Texas State (32–9)	Auburn (31–14)	Texas (37–17)	Auburn (35–16)	UC Santa Barbara (40–12)	Gonzaga (36–17)	Maryland (48–14)	18.
19.	UC Irvine	Liberty (6–1)	Virginia (11–0)	Clemson (14–1) (1)	TCU (14–5)	Miami (FL) (17–6)	Florida State (16–11)	Dallas Baptist (21–10)	Vanderbilt (25–10)	TCU (27–13)	LSU (29–14)	Texas State (38–11)	Vanderbilt (34–16)	TCU (35–18)	Virginia (38–17)	Texas State (47–14)	19.
20.	Oregon State	Georgia Tech (7–1)	TCU (8–3)	Georgia (13–3)	Maryland (16–3)	Texas State (20–5)	North Carolina (20–8)	Texas State (24–9)	TCU (24–12)	LSU (27–12)	Texas (31–16)	Auburn (32–16)	Texas (35–17)	LSU (37–18)	Auburn (37–19)	Miami (FL) (40–20)	20.
21.	Virginia	Maryland (7–0)	Clemson (11–0)	TCU (11–4)	Texas State (18–3)	Georgia Tech (16–9)	TCU (19–9)	UConn (24–7)	Maryland (29–7)	Auburn (29–12)	Texas A&M (27–15)	Vanderbilt (31–15)	UC Santa Barbara (37–11)т	Auburn (37–18)	UC Santa Barbara (43–12)	Florida (42–24)	21.
22.	Dallas Baptist	Virginia (7–0)	NC State (8–4)	Maryland (12–2)	Louisville (16–4)	Oregon (16–7)	Florida (18–10)	Auburn (22–10)	Auburn (24–12)	Vanderbilt (28–11)	Texas State (34–11)	Georgia (32–16)	Florida State (32–18)т	UCLA (35–20)	Florida (39–22)	LSU (40–22)	22.
23.	Georgia Tech	Miami (FL) (7–1)	Maryland (9–2)	Texas State (14–3)	Clemson (15–4)	Maryland (18–5)	Maryland (22–6)	Stanford (17–10)	Oregon (24–11)	Maryland (32–8)	Vanderbilt (29–13)	UC Santa Barbara (33–11)	UCLA (33–18)	UConn (43–13)	TCU (36–20)	UCLA (40–24)	23.
24.	UCLA	North Carolina (6–1)	Tulane (10–2)	Mississippi State (10–7)	Stanford (9–7)	Gonzaga (16–6)	Southern Miss (19–8)	Maryland (25–7)	LSU (23–12)	Wofford (30–10)	Georgia Tech (27–18)	UCLA (30–17)	LSU (33–18)	Vanderbilt (35–19)	Georgia Southern (40–18)	Vanderbilt (39–23)	24.
25.	Duke	Sacramento State (7–0)	UCLA (8–4)	Gonzaga (11–4)	Gonzaga (14–4)	Dallas Baptist (15–8)	NC State (18–9)	Wake Forest (25–7)	Dallas Baptist (23–12)	Georgia Southern (27–12)	Florida State (26–15)	Florida State (28–17)	Georgia (33–18)	Georgia Southern (38–17)т East Carolina (38–18)т	UCLA (38–22)	Texas Tech (39–22)	25.
	Preseason Feb 3	Week 2 Feb 28	Week 3 Mar 7	Week 4 Mar 14	Week 5 Mar 21	Week 6 Mar 28	Week 7 Apr 4	Week 8 Apr 11	Week 9 Apr 18	Week 10 Apr 25	Week 11 May 2	Week 12 May 9	Week 13 May 16	Week 14 May 23	Week 15 May 30	Final Jun 27	
		Dropped: No. 13 East Carolina; No. 19 UC Irvine; No. 22 Dallas Baptist; No. 24 UCLA; No. 25 Duke	Dropped: No. 15 Mississippi State; No. 23 Miami (FL); No. 25 Sacramento State	Dropped: No. 22 NC State; No. 24 Tulane; No. 25 UCLA	Dropped: No. 24 Mississippi State	Dropped: No. 17 Liberty; No. 23 Clemson; No. 24 Stanford	Dropped: No. 21 Georgia Tech; No. 22 Oregon; No. 25 Dallas Baptist	Dropped: No. 8 Ole Miss; No. 19 Florida State; No. 20 North Carolina; No. 21 TCU; No. 25 NC State	Dropped: No. 16 Arizona; No. 17 Florida; No. 25 Wake Forest	Dropped: No. 23 Oregon; No. 25 Dallas Baptist	Dropped: No. 19 TCU; No. 24 Wofford; No. 25 Georgia Southern	Dropped: No. 24 Georgia Tech	Dropped: None	Dropped: No. 21 Florida State; No. 25 Georgia	Dropped: No. 20 LSU; No. 23 UConn; No. 24 Vanderbilt	Dropped: No. 18 Gonzaga; No. 19 Virginia; No. 21 UC Santa Barbara; No. 23 TCU; No. 24 Georgia Southern	

== Baseball America ==
	Preseason Jan 24	Week 1 Feb 21	Week 2 Feb 28	Week 3 Mar 7	Week 4 Mar 14	Week 5 Mar 21	Week 6 Mar 28	Week 7 Apr 4	Week 8 Apr 11	Week 9 Apr 18	Week 10 Apr 25	Week 11 May 2	Week 12 May 9	Week 13 May 16	Week 14 May 23	Week 15 May 30	Final Jun 27	
1.	Texas	Texas (3–0)	Texas (8–0)	Texas (11–1)	Notre Dame (11–1)	Ole Miss (15–4)	Tennessee (23–1)	Tennessee (27–1)	Tennessee (31–1)	Tennessee (33–3)	Tennessee (37–3)	Tennessee (40–4)	Oregon State (38–9)	Tennessee (45–7)	Tennessee (49–7)	Tennessee (53–7)	Ole Miss (42–23)	1.
2.	Vanderbilt	Notre Dame (2–1)	Stanford (6–1)	Stanford (8–3)	Ole Miss (13–4)	Oregon State (14–4)	Oregon State (17–5)	Virginia (25–3)	Miami (FL) (26–6)	Oklahoma State (26–10)	Oregon State (31–8)	Oregon State (34–9)	Tennessee (42–6)	Oregon State (40–11)	Virginia Tech (40–11)	Stanford (41–14)	Oklahoma (45–24)	2.
3.	Mississippi State	Oklahoma State (2–1)	Notre Dame (5–1)	Notre Dame (8–1)	Oregon State (11–2)	Texas (17–5)	Virginia (22–2)	Arkansas (21–5)	Oklahoma State (23–9)	Oregon State (27–7)	Miami (FL) (31–9)	Oklahoma State (31–13)	Oklahoma State (34–13)	Virginia Tech (36–11)	Texas A&M (35–17)	Virginia Tech (41–12)	Texas A&M (44–20)	3.
4.	Notre Dame	Virginia (3–0)	Oklahoma State (4–2)	Ole Miss (10–1)	Texas (13–4)	Virginia (19–1)	Arkansas (18–4)	Oklahoma State (20–8)	Texas Tech (26–8)	Arkansas (28–7)	Stanford (24–12)	Virginia Tech (31–10)	Virginia Tech (33–10)	Texas A&M (33–16)	Stanford (37–14)	Texas A&M (37–18)	Arkansas (46–21)	4.
5.	Virginia	Stanford (2–1)	Virginia (7–0)	Virginia (11–0)	Virginia (14–1)	Vanderbilt (17–2)	Florida State (16–7)	Texas Tech (23–6)	Oregon State (24–7)	Miami (FL) (28–8)	Virginia (31–10)	Arkansas (34–10)	Arkansas (36–12)	Stanford (33–14)	Miami (FL) (39–16)	Oregon State (43–15)	Notre Dame (41–17)	5.
6.	Florida	Long Beach State (2–1)	Ole Miss (6–0)	Oklahoma State (6–4)	Vanderbilt (13–2)	Arkansas (16–3)	Oklahoma State (18–6)	Oregon State (20–7)	Virginia (26–6)	Stanford (20–11)	Southern Miss (32–8)	Miami (FL) (32–12)	Miami (FL) (35–12)	Texas Tech (34–16)	Louisville (38–16–1)	Miami (FL) (39–18)	Auburn (43–22)	6.
7.	Stanford	Vanderbilt (1–2)	Vanderbilt (5–2)	Vanderbilt (10–2)	Arkansas (11–3)	Tennessee (19–1)	Texas Tech (20–5)	Ole Miss (19–8)	Arkansas (23–7)	Southern Miss (27–8)	TCU (27–13)	Louisville (31–12)	Louisville (31–13–1)	Arkansas (37–14)	Oregon State (41–13)	Louisville (38–18–1)	Stanford (47–18)	7.
8.	Arkansas	Mississippi State (1–2)	LSU (7–1)	Oregon State (9–1)	Florida State (10–5)	Florida State (13–6)	Louisville (19–5)	Texas (21–9)	Texas (24–10)	Virginia (27–9)	Oklahoma State (27–13)	Notre Dame (28–10)	Notre Dame (28–10)	Notre Dame (31–11)	TCU (35–18)	Oklahoma (37–20)	Tennessee (57–9)	8.
9.	Ole Miss	Arkansas (2–1)	Oregon State (7–0)	Arkansas (7–3)	Tennessee (15–1)	Florida (15–5)	Ole Miss (16–7)	Miami (FL) (21–6)	Louisville (23–8)	Florida State (22–13)	Virginia Tech (28–9)	UCLA (30–13)	Stanford (29–14)	Miami (FL) (37–14)	Maryland (44–10)	Maryland (45–12)	Texas (47–22)	9.
10.	LSU	Ole Miss (3–0)	Arkansas (4–2)	Florida State (7–4)	Stanford (9–5)	Oklahoma State (14–6)	Texas (19–7)	Arizona (21–7)	Notre Dame (20–5)	Oregon (24–11)	Arkansas (31–9)	Stanford (25–14)	Gonzaga (29–13)	Gonzaga (32–13)	Gonzaga (34–15)	Gonzaga (36–17)	Virginia Tech (45–14)	10.
11.	Oregon State	LSU (3–0)	Mississippi State (4–3)	Tennessee (10–1)	Oklahoma State (9–6)	Notre Dame (12–4)	Vanderbilt (19–4)	Louisville (21–7)	Stanford (17–10)	Virginia Tech (23–9)	Gonzaga (26–11)	Gonzaga (28–13)	Virginia (34–12)	Virginia (35–13)	Arkansas (38–16)	Oklahoma State (39–20)	Oregon State (48–18)	11.
12.	Florida State	Oregon State (4–0)	Florida State (5–2)	Liberty (10–1)	Liberty (12–2)	Arizona (15–4)	Arizona (17–7)	Notre Dame (16–5)	Georgia (24–8)	Gonzaga (23–9)	Louisville (27–12)	Virginia (33–12)	Texas A&M (30–16)	Florida State (32–18)	Texas Tech (36–18)	North Carolina (38–19)	Louisville (42–21–1)	12.
13.	Arizona	Florida State (3–0)	Arizona (7–1)	Florida (10–3)	Florida (13–4)	Liberty (14–4)	Miami (FL) (17–6)	Florida State (16–11)	UCLA (21–9)	Louisville (24–11)	Notre Dame (26–8)	Southern Miss (34–10)	Florida State (28–17)	Oklahoma State (34–17)	Oklahoma State (36–18)	Texas (42–19)	North Carolina (42–22)	13.
14.	Georgia	Arizona (3–0)	Georgia (7–0)	Georgia Tech (10–2)	Georgia Tech (13–3)	North Carolina (17–3)	Notre Dame (12–5)	Stanford (14–9)	Southern Miss (23–8)	Notre Dame (21–8)	UCLA (27–12)	Texas A&M (27–15)	LSU (32–15)	Louisville (35–15–1)	Notre Dame (33–13)	Notre Dame (35–14)	Miami (FL) (40–20)	14.
15.	East Carolina	Georgia (3–0)	NC State (8–0)	UCLA (8–4)	Clemson (14–1)	Louisville (16–4)	North Carolina (18–6)	Gonzaga (18–7)	Gonzaga (21–8)	TCU (24–12)	Texas Tech (29–14)	Florida State (26–15)	Texas Tech (32–16)	TCU (32–18)	Texas State (44–11)	TCU (35–18)	UConn (50–16)	15.
16.	NC State	NC State (3–0)	Tennessee (7–0)	LSU (9–3)	LSU (13–3)	Georgia Tech (15–5)	Florida (17–7)	Texas State (23–6)	Arizona (22–10)	UCLA (23–11)	Georgia (28–12)	TCU (27–16)	Texas State (38–11)	Texas State (41–11)	Southern Miss (41–14)	Texas State (45–12)	Southern Miss (47–19)	16.
17.	Tennessee	Tennessee (3–0)	Liberty (6–1)	Arizona (9–3)	Arizona (12–4)	Georgia (16–4)	Gonzaga (16–6)	Georgia (22–6)	Auburn (22–8)	Texas Tech (26–12)	Georgia Southern (27–12)	Texas Tech (31–16)	Southern Miss (36–12)	Maryland (41–10)	Virginia (36–15)	Southern Miss (43–16)	East Carolina (46–21)	17.
18.	UC Irvine	Liberty (2–1)	Florida (6–2)	Georgia (9–2)	Georgia (13–3)	Stanford (9–7)	Dallas Baptist (15–8)	UCLA (18–8)	Texas State (24–9)	Georgia (26–10)	Texas (30–13)	Texas State (34–11)	UConn (40–8)	Southern Miss (38–14)	UCLA (35–20)	Florida (39–22)	Maryland (48–14)	18.
19.	Oklahoma State	Florida (1–2)	Georgia Tech (7–1)	Gonzaga (8–2)	North Carolina (14–2)	Gonzaga (14–4)	Texas State (20–5)	Vanderbilt (20–7)	Florida State (18–13)	Georgia Southern (24–11)	Texas State (32–9)	Maryland (35–9)	Maryland (37–10)	UConn (42–10)	Oklahoma (33–20)	UCLA (38–22)	Oklahoma State (42–22)	19.
20.	Nebraska	Georgia Tech (3–0)	Sacramento State (7–0)	North Carolina(11–1)	Gonzaga (11–4)	Clemson (15–4)	Oregon (16–7)	North Carolina (20–8)	Dallas Baptist (21–10)	Texas (26–12)	Maryland (32–8)	LSU (29–14)	TCU (28–18)	Auburn (35–16)	Auburn (37–18)	East Carolina (43–18)	TCU (38–22)	20.
21.	Georgia Tech	UCLA (2–1)	Maryland (7–0)	Clemson (11–0)	Maryland (12–2)	Maryland (16–3)	LSU (17–7)	Dallas Baptist (17–10)	Oregon (21–11)	Texas State (28–9)	Auburn (29–12)	Auburn (31–14)	Auburn (32–16)	Vanderbilt (34–16)	LSU (37–18)	Arkansas (38–18)	Texas State (47–14)	21.
22.	UCLA	Bryant (3–0)	Long Beach State (2–4)	Maryland (9–2)	Texas State (14–3)	Texas State (18–3)	Liberty (15–7)	Southern Miss (19–8)	Maryland (25–7)	Maryland (29–7)	Wofford (30–10)	Georgia (30–14)	UCLA (30–17)	UCLA (33–18)	Oregon (35–21)	Texas Tech (37–20)	Florida (42–24)	22.
23.	Texas Tech	Old Dominion (3–0)	UCLA (5–3)	Tulane (10–2)	Texas Tech (14–3)	Texas Tech (17–4)	Charlotte (16–7)	Oregon (17–10)	Wake Forest (25–7)	Auburn (24–10)	Texas A&M (25–14)	Georgia Tech (27–18)	UC Santa Barbara (33–11)	UC Santa Barbara (37–11)	UC Santa Barbara (40–11)	UC Santa Barbara (43–11)	UCLA (40–24)	23.
24.	Old Dominion	Miami (FL) (4–0)	Old Dominion (5–1)	Old Dominion (9–1)	Old Dominion (13–1)	Miami (FL) (13–6)	Stanford (12–8)	Maryland (22–6)	LSU (23–9)	Wofford (27–9)	Florida State (24–15)	Oregon (28–15)	Oklahoma (29–17)	Oklahoma (31–18)	Texas (39–17)	Auburn (37–19)	LSU (40–22)	24.
25.	Miami (FL)	East Carolina (0–3)	Miami (FL) (7–1)	NC State (8–4)	USC (11–3)	Old Dominion (16–2)	Maryland (18–5)	Auburn (19–7)	Wofford (24–9)	Dallas Baptist (23–12)	Oregon (26–13)	UC Santa Barbara (30–10)	Vanderbilt (31–15)	Arizona (35–18)	East Carolina (39–18)	Virginia (36–17)	Texas Tech (39–22)	25.
	Preseason Jan 24	Week 1 Feb 21	Week 2 Feb 28	Week 3 Mar 7	Week 4 Mar 14	Week 5 Mar 21	Week 6 Mar 28	Week 7 Apr 4	Week 8 Apr 11	Week 9 Apr 18	Week 10 Apr 25	Week 11 May 2	Week 12 May 9	Week 13 May 16	Week 14 May 23	Week 15 May 30	Final Jun 27	
		Dropped: No. 18 UC Irvine; No. 20 Nebraska; No. 23 Texas Tech	Dropped: No. 22 Bryant; No. 25 East Carolina	Dropped: No. 11 Mississippi State; No. 20 Sacramento State; No. 22 Long Beach State; No. 25 Miami (FL)	Dropped: No. 15 UCLA; No. 23 Tulane; No. 25 NC State	Dropped: No. 16 LSU; No. 25 USC	Dropped: No. 16 Georgia Tech; No. 17 Georgia; No. 20 Clemson; No. 25 Old Dominion	Dropped: No. 16 Florida; No. 21 LSU; No. 22 Liberty; No. 23 Charlotte	Dropped: No. 7 Ole Miss; No. 19 Vanderbilt; No. 20 North Carolina	Dropped: No. 16 Arizona; No. 23 Wake Forest; No. 24 LSU	Dropped: No. 25 Dallas Baptist	Dropped: No. 17 Georgia Southern; No. 18 Texas; No. 22 Wofford	Dropped: No. 22 Georgia; No. 23 Georgia Tech; No. 24 Oregon	Dropped: No. 14 LSU	Dropped: No. 12 Florida State; No. 19 UConn; No. 21 Vanderbilt; No. 25 Arizona	Dropped: No. 21 LSU; No. 22 Oregon	Dropped: No. 10 Gonzaga; No. 23 UC Santa Barbara; No. 25 Virginia	

== Collegiate Baseball ==
	Preseason Dec 20	Week 1 Feb 21	Week 2 Feb 28	Week 3 Mar 7	Week 4 Mar 14	Week 5 Mar 21	Week 6 Mar 28	Week 7 Apr 4	Week 8 Apr 11	Week 9 Apr 18	Week 10 Apr 25	Week 11 May 2	Week 12 May 9	Week 13 May 16	Week 14 May 23	Week 15 May 30	Week 16 Jun 7	Week 17 Jun 13	Week 18 Jun 27	
1.	Texas	Texas (3–0)	Texas (8–0)	Texas (11–1)	Vanderbilt (13–2)	Vanderbilt (17–2)	Tennessee (23–1)	Tennessee (27–1)	Tennessee (31–1)	Tennessee (33–3)	Tennessee (37–3)	Tennessee (40–4)	Oregon State (38–9)	Tennessee (45–7)	Tennessee (49–7)	Tennessee (53–7)	Tennessee (56–7)	Stanford (47–16)	Ole Miss (42–23)	1.
2.	Vanderbilt	LSU (3–0)	Stanford (6–1)	Vanderbilt (10–2)	Tennessee (15–1)	Tennessee (19–1)	Virginia (22–2)	Virginia (25–3)	Miami (FL) (26–6)	Arkansas (28–7)	Miami (FL) (31–9)	Arkansas (34–10)	Tennessee (42–6)	Oregon State (40–11)	Virginia Tech (40–11)	Stanford (41–14)	Stanford (45–15)	Texas A&M (42–18)	Oklahoma (45–24)	2.
3.	LSU	Oklahoma State (2–1)	LSU (7–1)	Tennessee (10–1)	Oregon State (11–2)	Virginia (19–1)	Vanderbilt (19–4)	Arkansas (21–6)	Louisville (23–8)	Oklahoma State (26–10)	Arkansas (31–9)	Oregon State (34–9)	Oklahoma State (34–13)	Virginia Tech (36–11)	Stanford (37–14)	Virginia Tech (41–12)	Virginia Tech (44–12)	Arkansas (43–19)	Arkansas (46–21)	3.
4.	Texas Tech	Vanderbilt (1–2)	Vanderbilt (5–2)	Oregon State (9–1)	LSU (13–3)	Texas (17–5)	Arkansas (18–4)	Louisville (21–7)	Oklahoma State (23–9)	Miami (FL) (28–8)	Stanford (24–12)	Oklahoma State (31–13)	Arkansas (36–12)	Stanford (33–14)	UC Santa Barbara (40–12)	UC Santa Barbara (43–12)	Oregon State (47–16)	Oklahoma (42–22)	Texas A&M (44–20)	4.
5.	Stanford	Stanford (2–1)	Georgia (7–0)	Stanford (8–3)	Virginia (14–1)	Arkansas (16–3)	Louisville (19–5)	Texas Tech (24–6)	Virginia (26–6)	Vanderbilt (25–10)	Oregon State (31–8)	Louisville (31–12)	Miami (FL) (35–12)	UC Santa Barbara (37–11)	Oregon State (41–13)	Oregon State (44–15)	Texas A&M (40–18)	Texas (47–20)	Notre Dame (44–17)	5.
6.	Florida	Notre Dame (2–1)	Tennessee (7–0)	LSU (9–3)	Texas (13–4)	North Carolina (17–3)	Texas Tech (20–5)	Vanderbilt (20–7)	Arkansas (23–7)	Stanford (20–11)	Vanderbilt (28–11)	UCLA (30–13)	Louisville (33–13–1)	Arkansas (37–14)	Texas A&M (35–17)	Texas A&M (37–18)	Louisville (42–19–1)	Notre Dame (40–15)	Auburn (43–22)	6.
7.	Oklahoma State	Georgia Tech (3–0)	Oregon State (7–0)	Virginia (11–0)	Notre Dame (11–1)	Georgia (16–4)	Texas (19–7)	Miami (FL) (21–6)	Notre Dame (20–5)	Oregon State (27–7)	Texas State (32–9)	Arizona (32–14)	Virginia Tech (33–10)	Texas A&M (33–16)	Louisville (38–16–1)	Louisville (38–18–1)	East Carolina (45–19)	Auburn (42–20)	Texas (47–22)	7.
8.	East Carolina	Florida State (3–0)	Oklahoma State (4–2)	Notre Dame (8–1)	Georgia Tech (13–3)	Ole Miss (15–4)	Oregon State (17–5)	Texas State (23–6)	Texas Tech (27–8)	Rutgers (30–6)	Southern Miss (37–8)	Virginia Tech (31–10)	UConn (40–8)	Miami (FL) (37–14)	Arkansas (38–16)	East Carolina (42–18)	Arkansas (41–19)	Ole Miss (37–22)	Stanford (47–18)	8.
9.	Mississippi State	Long Beach State (2–1)	Notre Dame (5–1)	Georgia Tech (10–2)	Ole Miss (13–2)	Texas State (18–3)	Texas State (20–5)	Arizona (21–7)	UCLA (22–9)	Texas State (28–9)	Oklahoma State (27–13)	Miami (FL) (32–12)	UC Santa Barbara (33–11)	Louisville (35–15–1)	Texas State (44–11)	Arkansas (38–18)	Oklahoma (40–21)	Tennessee (57–9)	Tennessee (57–9)	9.
10.	Notre Dame	Arizona (3–0)	Georgia Tech (7–1)	Ole Miss (10–1)	Georgia (13–3)	Arizona (15–4)	Oklahoma State (18–6)	Oklahoma State (20–8)	Texas (24–10)	Oregon (24–11)	Louisville (27–12)	UC Santa Barbara (30–10)	Stanford (29–14)	Texas State (41–11)	Miami (FL) (39–16)	Miami (FL) (39–18)	Texas (45–19)	Virginia Tech (45–14)	Virginia Tech (45–14)	10.
11.	Georgia Tech	Mississippi State (1–2)	Ole Miss (6–0)	Georgia (9–2)	North Carolina (12–2)	Oregon State (14–4)	Oregon (16–7)	Texas (21–9)	Vanderbilt (22–9)	Louisville (24–11)	Arizona (28–13)	UConn (37–8)	Texas A&M (30–16)	Vanderbilt (34–16)	East Carolina (38–18)	Texas State (45–12)	North Carolina (42–20)	Oregon State (48–18)	Oregon State (48–18)	11.
12.	Florida State	Liberty (2–1)	Virginia (7–0)	Liberty (10–1)	Liberty (12–2)	Georgia Tech (15–5)	Miami (FL) (17–6)	UCLA (19–8)	Arizona (22–10)	UCLA (24–11)	UCLA (27–12)	Stanford (25–14)	Texas State (38–11)	Texas Tech (35–16)	TCU (35–18)	TCU (36–20)	Southern Miss (47–17)	Louisville (42–21–1)	Louisville (42–21–1)	12.
13.	TCU	Florida (1–2)	NC State (8–0)	Florida (10–3)	Florida (13–4)	Florida (15–5)	Florida State (16–7)	Georgia (22–6)	Georgia (24–8)	UC Santa Barbara (24–8)	UC Santa Barbara (27–9)	Texas A&M (27–15)	Arizona (33–17)	Arizona (35–18)	UCLA (35–20)	UCLA (38–22)	Notre Dame (38–14)	East Carolina (46–21)	East Carolina (46–21)	13.
14.	UC Irvine	TCU (2–1)	Arizona (7–1)	North Carolina (11–1)	Stanford (9–5)	LSU (15–5)	North Carolina (18–6)	Ole Miss (19–8)	Auburn (22–10)	UConn (28–7)	UConn (32–8)	Vanderbilt (29–13)	Ball State (32–14)	UCLA (33–18)	Texas Tech (36–18)	Oklahoma State (39–20)	UConn (49–14)	North Carolina (42–22)	North Carolina (42–22)	14.
15.	Louisiana Tech	Louisiana Tech (3–0)	Liberty (6–1)	Gonzaga (8–2)	Texas State (14–3)	Louisville (16–4)	Georgia (18–6)	Notre Dame (16–5)	Stanford (17–10)	Southern Miss (27–8)	Notre Dame (26–8)	Texas State (34–11)	UCLA (30–17)	TCU (32–18)	Oklahoma State (36–18)	Texas Tech (37–20)	Auburn (40–19)	Southern Miss (47–19)	Southern Miss (47–19)	15.
16.	Central Michigan	Texas Tech (1–2)	Florida (6–2)	Oklahoma State (6–4)	Arizona (12–4)	Texas Tech (17–4)	Purdue (18–1)	Stanford (14–9)	Oregon State (24–7)	Virginia (27–9)	Virginia (31–10)	Southern Miss (34–10)	Vanderbilt (31–15)	Oklahoma State (34–17)	LSU (37–18)	Oklahoma (37–20)	Ole Miss (35–22)	UConn (50–16)	UConn (50–16)	16.
17.	UC Santa Barbara	Georgia (3–0)	Florida State (5–2)	Texas State (10–2)	Texas Tech (14–3)	Purdue (17–1)	LSU (17–7)	Cal Poly (18–10)	LSU (23–9)	Notre Dame (21–8)	Auburn (29–12)	Notre Dame (28–10)	Notre Dame (28–10)	UConn (42–10)	Oregon (35–21)	Texas (42–19)	Texas State (47–14)	Texas State (47–14)	Texas State (47–14)	17.
18.	UCLA	Tennessee (3–0)	TCU (6–1)	Arizona (9–3)	Arkansas (11–3)	Old Dominion (16–2)	Florida (17–7)	Auburn (19–9)	Texas State (24–9)	Texas (26–12)	TCU (27–13)	Virginia (33–12)	Virginia (34–12)	Notre Dame (31–11)	Cal Poly (35–20)	North Carolina (38–19)	UC Santa Barbara (44–14)	UC Santa Barbara (44–14)	UC Santa Barbara (44–14)	18.
19.	Ole Miss	Oregon State (4–0)	Maryland (7–0)	Texas Tech (10–2)	Purdue (15–0)	Notre Dame (12–4)	Arizona (17–7)	Oregon State (20–7)	UC Santa Barbara (21–8)	Arizona (24–12)	Central Michigan (28–10)	Auburn (31–14)	LSU (32–15)	Virginia (37–13)	Maryland (44–10)	LSU (38–20)	TCU (38–22)	TCU (38–22)	TCU (38–22)	19.
20.	Arkansas	UC Santa Barbara (2–1)	Arkansas (4–2)	Arkansas (7–3)	Clemson (14–1)	Liberty (14–4)	Ole Miss (16–7)	NC State (18–9)	Florida (21–11)	Georgia (26–10)	Texas (30–13)	Ball State (29–14)	Southern Miss (36–12)	Ole Miss (31–19)	Southern Miss (41–14)	Oregon (35–23)	UCLA (40–24)	UCLA (40–24)	UCLA (40–24)	20.
21.	Oregon	UCLA (2–1)	North Carolina (6–1)	Purdue (12–0)	Old Dominion (13–1)	Oregon (13–6)	UC Santa Barbara (16–5)	Oregon (18–10)	Oregon (21–11)	Auburn (24–12)	Oregon (26–13)	Rutgers (36–9)	Auburn (32–16)	East Carolina (34–18)	Notre Dame (33–13)	Maryland (45–12)	Oklahoma State (42–22)	Oklahoma State (42–22)	Oklahoma State (42–22)	21.
22.	Arizona	Ole Miss (3–0)	Miami (FL) (7–1)	Florida State (7–4)	Florida State (10–5)	Florida State (13–6)	NC State (15–8)	North Carolina (20–8)	Rutgers (25–6)	TCU (21–12)	Georgia (28–12)	Maryland (35–9)	Rutgers (37–11)	Maryland (41–10)	Virginia (38–15)	Southern Miss (43–16)	Texas Tech (39–22)	Texas Tech (39–22)	Texas Tech (39–22)	22.
23.	Miami (FL)	Arkansas (2–1)	Texas Tech (5–2)	Miami (FL) (8–3)	Miami (FL) (11–4)	Miami (FL) (13–6)	Louisiana Tech (18–6)	LSU (19–9)	Wake Forest (25–7)	NC State (23–11)	Texas A&M (25–14)	LSU (29–14)	Maryland (37–10)	Auburn (35–16)	Auburn (37–18)	Notre Dame (35–14)	LSU (40–22)	LSU (40–22)	LSU (40–22)	23.
24.	Virginia	Miami (FL) (4–0)	Mississippi State (4–3)	UCLA (8–4)	Gonzaga (11–4)	Gonzaga (14–4)	TCU (18–5)	UC Santa Barbara (18–7)	West Virginia (20–10)	Florida State (22–13)	Rutgers (32–9)	Georgia (30–14)	Grand Canyon (33–16)	Florida State (32–18)	Georgia (35–20)	Virginia (38–17)	Arizona (39–25)	Arizona (39–25)	Arizona (39–25)	24.
25.	North Carolina	Virginia (3–0)	Louisiana Tech (5–2)	Old Dominion (9–1)	USC (11–3)	Oklahoma State (14–6)	UCLA (15–8)	Ball State (17–9)	UConn (24–7)	Central Michigan (23–10)	Maryland (32–8)	Oregon (28–15)	Georgia (32–16)	Rutgers (39–12)	Florida (35–20)	Florida (39–22)	Miami (FL) (40–20)	Miami (FL) (40–20)	Miami (FL) (40–20)	25.
26.	Louisville	North Carolina (3–0)	UC Santa Barbara (5–2)	Tulane (10–2)	Oklahoma State (9–6)	UConn (14–3)	San Diego (15–7)	San Diego (17–9)	Cal Poly (24–7)	Cal Poly (22–13)	Virginia Tech (28–9)	NC State (29–13)	Florida (29–18)	Southern Miss (38–14)	UConn (43–13)	UConn (46–13)	Maryland (48–14)	Maryland (48–14)	Maryland (48–14)	26.
27.	NC State	NC State (3–0)	UCLA (5–3)	UConn (8–1)	UConn (11–2)	TCU (14–5)	Southern Miss (17–7)	Southern Miss (19–8)	Southern Miss (23–8)	Texas A&M (22–13)	LSU (27–12)	Florida State (26–15)	Florida State (28–17)	Georgia (33–18)	Ole Miss (32–21)	Auburn (37–19)	Florida (42–24)	Florida (42–24)	Florida (42–24)	27.
28.	Duke	Bryant (3–0)	Kentucky (7–0)	TCU (8–3)	TCU (11–4)	Maryland (16–3)	Old Dominion (18–4)	Gonzaga (18–7)	Gonzaga (21–8)	West Virginia (22–12)	NC State (25–13)	TCU (27–16)	TCU (28–18)	Florida (32–19)	Grand Canyon (39–17)	Georgia (35–21)	Vanderbilt (39–23)	Vanderbilt (39–23)	Vanderbilt (39–23)	28.
29.	Campbell	UC San Diego (3–0)	Coastal Carolina (6–1)	Maryland (9–2)	Maryland (12–2)	South Alabama (15–3)	Notre Dame (12–5)	Old Dominion (20–6)	Grand Canyon (23–11)	Gonzaga (23–9)	Florida State (24–15)	Grand Canyon (30–15)	Gonzaga (29–13)	Gonzaga (32–13)	Gonzaga (34–15)	Ole Miss (32–22)	Georgia Tech (36–24)	Georgia Tech (36–24)	Georgia Tech (36–24)	29.
30.	Michigan	West Virginia (3–0)	Old Dominion (5–1)	UC Santa Barbara (7–4)	UC Santa Barbara (10–4)	Texas A&M (12–7)	Gonzaga (16–6)	UNLV (19–9)	Central Michigan (18–10)	Grand Canyon (25–12)	Cal Poly (24–15)	Georgia Tech (27–18)	Texas Tech (32–16)	Grand Canyon (36–17)	Iowa (33–17)	Georgia Southern (40–18)	Coastal Carolina (39–20–1)	Coastal Carolina (39–20–1)	Coastal Carolina (39–20–1)	30.
	Preseason Dec 20	Week 1 Feb 21	Week 2 Feb 28	Week 3 Mar 7	Week 4 Mar 14	Week 5 Mar 21	Week 6 Mar 28	Week 7 Apr 4	Week 8 Apr 11	Week 9 Apr 18	Week 10 Apr 25	Week 11 May 2	Week 12 May 9	Week 13 May 16	Week 14 May 23	Week 15 May 30	Week 16 Jun 7	Week 17 Jun 13	Week 18 Jun 27	
		Dropped: No. 8 East Carolina; No. 14 UC Irvine; No. 16 Central Michigan; No. 21 Oregon; No. 26 Louisville; No. 28 Duke; No. 29 Campbell; No. 30 Michigan	Dropped: No. 9 Long Beach State; No. 28 Bryant; No. 29 UC San Diego; No. 30 West Virginia	Dropped: No. 13 NC State; No. 24 Mississippi State; No. 25 Louisiana Tech; No. 28 Kentucky; No. 29 Coastal Carolina	Dropped: No. 24 UCLA; No. 26 Tulane	Dropped: No. 14 Stanford; No. 20 Clemson; No. 25 USC; No. 30 UC Santa Barbara	Dropped: No. 12 Georgia Tech; No. 20 Liberty; No. 26 UConn; No. 28 Maryland; No. 29 South Alabama; No. 30 Texas A&M	Dropped: No. 13 Florida State; No. 16 Purdue; No. 18 Florida; No. 23 Louisiana Tech; No. 24 TCU	Dropped: No. 14 Ole Miss; No. 20 NC State; No. 22 North Carolina; No. 25 Ball State; No. 26 San Diego; No. 29 Old Dominion; No. 30 UNLV	Dropped: No. 8 Texas Tech; No. 17 LSU; No. 20 Florida; No. 23 Wake Forest	Dropped: No. 28 West Virginia; No. 29 Gonzaga; No. 30 Grand Canyon	Dropped: No. 19 Central Michigan; No. 20 Texas; No. 30 Cal Poly	Dropped: No. 25 Oregon; No. 26 NC State; No. 30 Georgia Tech	Dropped: No. 14 Ball State; No. 19 LSU	Dropped: No. 11 Vanderbilt; No. 13 Arizona; No. 24 Florida State; No. 25 Rutgers	Dropped: No. 18 Cal Poly; No. 28 Grand Canyon; No. 29 Gonzaga; No. 30 Iowa	Dropped: No. 20 Oregon; No. 24 Virginia; No. 28 Georgia; No. 30 Georgia Southern	Dropped: None	Dropped: None	

The Preseason poll ranked the top 50 teams in the nation. Teams not listed above are: 31. Nebraska; 32. Dallas Baptist; 33. Georgia; 34. Tennessee; 35. Gonzaga; 36. South Alabama; 37. Liberty; 38. Maryland; 39. UConn; 40. Alabama; 41. Fairfield; 42. Oregon State; 43. Arizona State; 44. South Carolina; 45. Oklahoma; 46. Long Beach State; 47. Cal Poly; 48. Southern Miss; 49. Old Dominion; 50. Nevada

== NCBWA ==
	Preseason Feb 3	Week 1 Feb 21	Week 2 Feb 28	Week 3 Mar 7	Week 4 Mar 14	Week 5 Mar 21	Week 6 Mar 28	Week 7 Apr 4	Week 8 Apr 11	Week 9 Apr 18	Week 10 Apr 25	Week 11 May 2	Week 12 May 9	Week 13 May 16	Week 14 May 23	Week 15 May 30	Week 16 Jun 7	Final Jun 27	
1.	Texas (15)	Texas (3–0)	Texas (8–0)	Texas (11–1)	Vanderbilt (13–2)	Vanderbilt (17–2)	Tennessee (23–1)	Tennessee (27–1)	Tennessee (31–1)	Tennessee (33–3)	Tennessee (37–3)	Tennessee (40–4)	Oregon State (38–9)	Tennessee (45–7)	Tennessee (49–7)	Tennessee (53–7)	Tennessee (56–7)	Ole Miss (42–23)	1.
2.	Vanderbilt (7)	Ole Miss (3–0)	Ole Miss (6–0)	Ole Miss (10–1)	Ole Miss (13–2)	Arkansas (16–3)	Arkansas (18–4)	Arkansas (21–5)	Oregon State (24–7)	Oregon State (27–7)	Oregon State (31–8)	Oregon State (34–9)	Tennessee (42–6)	Oregon State (40–11)	Virginia Tech (40–11)	Stanford (41–14)	Stanford (45–15)	Oklahoma (45–24)	2.
3.	Mississippi State (3)	Arkansas (2–1)	Stanford (6–1)	Vanderbilt (10–2)	Texas (13–4)	Tennessee (19–1)	Virginia (22–2)	Virginia (25–3)	Miami (FL) (26–6)	Arkansas (28–7)	Miami (FL) (31–9)	Oklahoma State (31–13)	Oklahoma State (34–13)	Virginia Tech (36–11)	Stanford (37–14)	Oregon State (44–15)	Oregon State (47–16)	Arkansas (46–21)	3.
4.	Arkansas (5)	Stanford (2–1)	NC State (8–0)	Stanford (8–3)	Arkansas (11–3)	Texas (17–5)	Oregon State (17–5)	Texas Tech (24–6)	Arkansas (23–7)	Oklahoma State (26–10)	Southern Miss (32–8)	Arkansas (34–10)	Arkansas (36–12)	Texas A&M (33–16)	Oregon State (41–13)	Virginia Tech (41–12)	Virginia Tech (44–12)	Texas A&M (44–20)	4.
5.	Stanford (1)	Oklahoma State (2–1)	LSU (7–1)	Arkansas (7–3)	Oregon State (11–2)т	Ole Miss (15–4)	Vanderbilt (19–4)	Oregon State (20–7)	Texas Tech (27–8)	Miami (FL) (28–8)	Stanford (24–12)	Southern Miss (34–10)т	Virginia Tech (33–10)	Miami (FL) (37–14)	Texas A&M (35–17)	Texas A&M (37–18)	Texas A&M (40–18)	Notre Dame (41–17)	5.
6.	Ole Miss (1)	LSU (3–0)	Vanderbilt (5–2)	Oregon State (9–1)	Notre Dame (11–1)т	Oregon State (14–4)	Texas Tech (20–5)	Ole Miss (19–8)	Texas (24–10)	Southern Miss (27–8)	Arkansas (31–9)	Virginia Tech (31–10)т	Miami (FL) (35–12)	Texas Tech (35–16)	Miami (FL) (39–16)	Oklahoma State (39–20)	Notre Dame (38–14)	Auburn (43–22)	6.
7.	Florida	NC State (3–0)	Arkansas (4–2)	Notre Dame (8–1)	Tennessee (15–1)	Florida (15–5)	Texas (19–7)	Oklahoma State (20–8)	Oklahoma State (23–9)	Texas (26–12)	Texas (30–13)	Miami (FL) (32–12)	Louisville (33–13–1)	Louisville (35–15–1)	Louisville (38–16–1)	Maryland (45–12)	Texas (45–19)	Stanford (47–18)	7.
8.	LSU	Arizona (3–0)	Oklahoma State (4–2)	LSU (9–3)	Georgia Tech (15–3)	Virginia (19–1)	Oklahoma State (18–6)	Texas (21–9)	Virginia (26–6)	Stanford (20–11)	Oklahoma State (27–13)	UCLA (30–13)	Texas Tech (32–16)	Stanford (33–14)	Oklahoma State (36–18)	Texas (42–19)	Auburn (40–19)	Texas (47–22)	8.
9.	Notre Dame	Vanderbilt (1–2)	Oregon State (7–0)	Tennessee (10–1)	LSU (13–3)	Arizona (15–4)	Florida State (16–7)	Arizona (21–7)	Notre Dame (20–5)	Texas Tech (27–12)	Virginia Tech (28–9)	Texas Tech (31–16)	Stanford (29–14)	Arkansas (37–14)	Texas Tech (36–18)	Notre Dame (35–14)	East Carolina (45–19)	Tennessee (57–9)	9.
10.	Arizona	Mississippi State (1–2)	Georgia (7–0)	Florida (10–3)	Florida (13–4)	Florida State (13–6)	Ole Miss (16–7)	Vanderbilt (20–7)	Georgia (24–8)	Gonzaga (23–9)	Virginia (31–10)	UConn (37–8)	UConn (40–8)	Oklahoma State (34–17)	Arkansas (38–16)	Miami (FL) (39–18)	Arkansas (41–19)	Oregon State (48–18)	10.
11.	NC State	Florida State (3–0)	Arizona (7–1)	Oklahoma State (6–4)	Stanford (9–5)	Texas Tech (17–4)	LSU (17–7)	Georgia (22–6)	Louisville (23–8)	Virginia (27–9)	Texas Tech (29–14)	Gonzaga (28–13)	Gonzaga (29–13)	Texas State (41–11)	Maryland (44–10)	Texas Tech (37–20)	Louisville (42–19–1)	Southern Miss (47–19)	11.
12.	East Carolina	Oregon State (4–0)	Mississippi State (4–3)	Georgia Tech (10–2)	Texas Tech (14–3)	Georgia Tech (15–5)	TCU (18–5)	Miami (FL) (21–6)	LSU (23–9)	Georgia (26–10)	UCLA (27–12)	Stanford (25–14)	Southern Miss (36–12)	UConn (42–10)	Texas State (44–11)	Louisville (38–18–1)	Oklahoma (40–21)	Louisville (42–21–1)	12.
13.	Oklahoma State	Notre Dame (2–1)	Notre Dame (5–1)	Florida State (7–4)	Florida State (10–5)	North Carolina (17–3)	Florida (17–7)	Notre Dame (16–5)	UCLA (22–9)	UConn (28–7)	UConn (32–8)	Virginia (33–12)	Virginia (34–12)	Gonzaga (32–13)	Notre Dame (33–13)	Gonzaga (36–17)	Southern Miss (47–17)	Virginia Tech (45–14)	13.
14.	Texas Tech	Long Beach State (2–1)	Tennessee (7–0)	Arizona (9–3)	Arizona (12–4)	Oklahoma State (14–6)	Arizona (17–7)	Texas State (23–6)	Arizona (22–10)	Notre Dame (21–8)	Gonzaga (26–11)	Louisville (31–12)	Maryland (37–10)	Notre Dame (31–11)	Gonzaga (34–15)	Oklahoma (37–20)	UConn (49–14)	East Carolina (46–21)	14.
15.	Florida State	Tennessee (3–0)	Florida State (5–2)	Texas Tech (10–2)	North Carolina (14–2)	Notre Dame (12–4)	Louisville (19–5)	Louisville (21–7)	Southern Miss (23–8)	UCLA (24–11)	Georgia (28–12)	Maryland (35–9)	Notre Dame (28–10)	Virginia (37–13)	Virginia (38–15)	Texas State (45–12)	North Carolina (42–20)	North Carolina (42–22)	15.
16.	Tennessee (1)	Georgia (3–0)	Florida (6–2)	Liberty (10–1)	Virginia (14–1)	LSU (15–5)	Miami (FL) (17–6)	LSU (19–9)	Gonzaga (21–8)	Virginia Tech (23–9)	Notre Dame (26–8)	Notre Dame (28–10)	Texas A&M (30–16)	Vanderbilt (34–16)	Texas (39–17)	UCLA (38–22)	Oklahoma State (42–22)	UConn (50–16)	16.
17.	Virginia	Florida (1–2)	TCU (6–1)	Virginia (11–0)	Liberty (12–2)	Georgia (16–4)	Georgia (18–6)	Gonzaga (18–7)	Vanderbilt (22–9)	Louisville (24–11)	Louisville (27–12)	Georgia (30–14)	Texas State (38–11)	Texas (35–17)	Southern Miss (41–14)	Southern Miss (43–16)	Maryland (48–14)	Oklahoma State (42–22)	17.
18.	Oregon State	Georgia Tech (3–0)	Miami (FL) (7–1)	NC State (8–4)	Oklahoma State (9–6)	Liberty (14–4)	North Carolina (18–6)	TCU (19–9)	Stanford (17–10)	Texas State (28–9)	TCU (27–13)	Texas (31–16)	LSU (32–15)	Southern Miss (38–14)	TCU (35–18)	Arkansas (38–18)	Texas State (47–14)	Texas State (47–14)	18.
19.	UC Irvine	TCU (2–1)	Georgia Tech (7–1)	Georgia (9–2)	Georgia (13–3)	Stanford (9–7)	Notre Dame (12–5)	UCLA (19–8)	Dallas Baptist (21–10)	Maryland (29–7)	Auburn (29–12)	LSU (29–14)	Texas (34–17)	Auburn (35–16)	UC Santa Barbara (40–12)	UC Santa Barbara (43–12)	Ole Miss (35–22)	Maryland (48–14)	19.
20.	TCU	Virginia (3–0)	Maryland (7–0)	North Carolina (11–1)	Clemson (14–1)	TCU (14–5)	Stanford (12–8)	Florida State (16–11)	Florida (21–11)	Vanderbilt (25–10)	Texas State (32–9)	Texas State (34–11)	UCLA (30–17)	Maryland (41–10)	LSU (37–18)	Florida (39–22)	Florida (42–24)	Miami (FL) (40–20)	20.
21.	UCLA	Texas Tech (1–2)	Texas Tech (5–2)	Clemson (11–0)	TCU (11–4)	Texas State (18–3)	Gonzaga (16–6)	North Carolina (20–8)	UConn (24–7)	TCU (24–12)	Maryland (32–8)	Texas A&M (27–15)	UC Santa Barbara (33–11)	LSU (33–18)	UCLA (35–20)	Virginia (38–17)	UCLA (40–24)	LSU (40–22)	21.
22.	Georgia	Miami (FL) (4–0)	Liberty (6–1)	UCLA (8–4)	Maryland (12–2)	Maryland (16–3)	Dallas Baptist (15–8)	Stanford (14–9)	Maryland (25–7)	Oregon (24–11)	Vanderbilt (28–11)	Auburn (31–14)	Auburn (32–16)	UC Santa Barbara (37–11)	UConn (43–13)	TCU (36–20)	Miami (FL) (40–20)	Florida (42–24)	22.
23.	Dallas Baptist	UCLA (2–1)	Virginia (7–0)	TCU (8–3)	Mississippi State (10–7)	Gonzaga (14–4)	Texas State (20–5)	Florida (18–10)	Auburn (22–10)	LSU (23–12)	LSU (27–12)	Florida State (26–15)	Florida State (28–17)	Florida State (32–18)	Auburn (37–18)	East Carolina (42–18)	LSU (40–22)	Texas Tech (39–22)	23.
24.	Georgia Tech	Liberty (2–1)	Sacramento State (7–0)	Mississippi State (6–6)	Gonzaga (11–4)	Louisville (16–4)	Georgia Tech (16–9)	Maryland (22–6)	Texas State (24–9)	Dallas Baptist (23–12)	Georgia Southern (27–12)	Oregon (28–15)	Vanderbilt (31–15)	TCU (32–18)	Grand Canyon (39–17)	LSU (38–20)	Texas Tech (39–22)	Vanderbilt (39–23)	24.
25.	Nebraska	Maryland (3–0)	UCLA (5–3)	Maryland (9–2)	Old Dominion (13–1)	Old Dominion (16–2)	Oregon (16–7)	UConn (19–7)	Ole Miss (19–12)	Auburn (24–12)	Oregon (26–13)	UC Santa Barbara (30–10)	Georgia (32–16)	UCLA (33–18)	Vanderbilt (35–19)	North Carolina (38–19)	Vanderbilt (39–23)	TCU (38–22)	25.
26.	Miami (FL)	Duke (2–1)	Old Dominion (5–1)	Tulane (10–2)	Texas State (14–3)	Clemson (15–4)	Maryland (18–5)	Southern Miss (19–8)	TCU (21–11)	Florida State (22–13)	Texas A&M (25–14)	Vanderbilt (29–13)	Grand Canyon (33–16)	Grand Canyon (36–17)	Oklahoma (33–20)	UConn (46–13)	UC Santa Barbara (44–14)	Gonzaga (37–19)	26.
27.	Old Dominion	East Carolina (0–3)	North Carolina (6–1)	Old Dominion (9–1)	Miami (11–4)	UConn (14–3)	UConn (17–5)	Dallas Baptist (17–10)	Wake Forest (25–7)	Arizona (21–12)	Arizona (28–13)	Arizona (32–14)	TCU (28–18)	Arizona (35–18)	East Carolina (38–18)	Auburn (37–19)	TCU (38–22)	UCLA (40–24)	27.
28.	Oregon	Old Dominion (3–0)	Long Beach State (2–4)	Gonzaga (8–2)	Kentucky (14–3)	Wake Forest (16–4)	Liberty (15–7)	Georgia Tech (18–11)	Virginia Tech (20–8)	Rutgers (30–6)	Wofford (30–10)	TCU (27–16)	Rutgers (37–11)	Georgia (33–18)	Oregon (35–21)	Vanderbilt (36–21)	Gonzaga (37–19)	UC Santa Barbara (44–14)	28.
29.	Long Beach State	Bryant	Clemson (7–0)	Miami (FL) (8–3)	NC State (9–6)	Miami (FL) (13–6)	Purdue (18–1)	NC State (18–9)	Florida State (18–13)	Georgia Southern (24–11)	UC Santa Barbara (27–9)	Rutgers (36–9)	Oregon (28–19)	Rutgers (39–12)	Florida (35–20)	Georgia Southern (40–18)	Arizona (39–25)	Georgia Southern (41–20)	29.
30.	Duke	Louisiana Tech (3–0)	Louisiana Tech (5–2)	Wake Forest (11–0)	UConn (11–2)	Mississippi State (12–9)	Old Dominion (18–4)	Oregon (18–10)	Alabama (21–12)	Mercer (31–5)	Florida State (24–15)	Georgia Tech (27–18)	Arizona (33–17)т Dallas Baptist (30–17)т	Dallas Baptist (33–18)т East Carolina (34–18)т	Florida State (33–22)	San Diego (36–18)	Virginia (39–19)	Virginia (39–19)	30.
	Preseason Feb 3	Week 1 Feb 21	Week 2 Feb 28	Week 3 Mar 7	Week 4 Mar 14	Week 5 Mar 21	Week 6 Mar 28	Week 7 Apr 4	Week 8 Apr 11	Week 9 Apr 18	Week 10 Apr 25	Week 11 May 2	Week 12 May 9	Week 13 May 16	Week 14 May 23	Week 15 May 30	Week 16 Jun 7	Final Jun 27	
		Dropped: No. 19 UC Irvine; No. 23 Dallas Baptist; No. 25 Nebraska; No. 28 Oregon	Dropped: No. 26 Duke; No. 27 East Carolina; No. 29 Bryant	Dropped: No. 24 Sacramento State; No. 28 Long Beach State; No. 30 Louisiana Tech	Dropped: No. 22 UCLA; No. 26 Tulane; No. 30 Wake Forest	Dropped: No. 28 Kentucky; No. 29 NC State	Dropped: No. 26 Clemson; No. 28 Wake Forest; No. 30 Mississippi State	Dropped: No. 28 Liberty; No. 29 Purdue; No. 30 Old Dominion	Dropped: No. 21 North Carolina; No. 28 Georgia Tech; No. 29 NC State; No. 30 Oregon	Dropped: No. 20 Florida; No. 25 Ole Miss; No. 27 Wake Forest; No. 30 Alabama	Dropped: No. 24 Dallas Baptist; No. 28 Rutgers; No. 30 Mercer	Dropped: No. 24 Georgia Southern; No. 28 Wofford	Dropped: No. 30 Georgia Tech	Dropped: No. 29 Oregon	Dropped: No. 27 Arizona; No. 28 Georgia; No. 29 Rutgers; No. 30т Dallas Baptist	Dropped: No. 24 Grand Canyon; No. 28 Oregon; No. 30 Florida State	Dropped: No. 29 Georgia Southern; No. 30 San Diego	Dropped: No. 29 Arizona	

The Preseason poll ranked the top 35 teams in the nation. Teams not listed above are: 31. Southern Miss; 32. Louisiana Tech; 33. UC Santa Barbara; 34. Gonzaga; 35 Liberty.

== D1Baseball ==
	Preseason Jan 18	Week 1 Feb 21	Week 2 Feb 28	Week 3 Mar 7	Week 4 Mar 14	Week 5 Mar 21	Week 6 Mar 28	Week 7 Apr 4	Week 8 Apr 11	Week 9 Apr 18	Week 10 Apr 25	Week 11 May 2	Week 12 May 9	Week 13 May 16	Week 14 May 23	Week 15 May 31	Final Jun 27	
1.	Texas	Texas (3–0)	Texas (8–0)	Texas (11–1)	Ole Miss (13–2)	Ole Miss (15–4)	Tennessee (23–1)	Tennessee (27–1)	Tennessee (31–1)	Tennessee (33–3)	Tennessee (37–3)	Tennessee (40–4)	Tennessee (42–6)	Tennessee (45–7)	Tennessee (49–7)	Tennessee (53–7)	Ole Miss (42–23)	1.
2.	Arkansas	Arkansas (2–1)	Ole Miss (6–0)	Ole Miss (10–1)	Texas (13–4)	Texas (17–5)	Arkansas (18–4)	Arkansas (21–5)	Miami (FL) (26–6)	Oregon State (27–7)	Oregon State (31–8)	Oregon State (34–9)	Oregon State (38–9)	Oregon State (40–11)	Virginia Tech (40–11)	Stanford (41–14)	Oklahoma (45–24)	2.
3.	Vanderbilt	Ole Miss (3–0)	Arkansas (4–2)	Arkansas (7–3)	Arkansas (11–3)	Arkansas (16–3)	Oregon State (17–5)	Virginia (25–3)	Oregon State (24–7)	Oklahoma State (26–10)	Miami (FL) (31–9)	Oklahoma State (31–13)	Oklahoma State (34–13)	Virginia Tech (36–11)	Stanford (37–14)	Oregon State (44–15)	Texas A&M (44–20)	3.
4.	Mississippi State	Oklahoma State (2–1)	Oklahoma State (4–2)	Vanderbilt (10–2)	Vanderbilt (13–2)	Vanderbilt (17–2)	Virginia (22–2)	Texas Tech (24–6)	Texas Tech (27–8)	Arkansas (28–7)	Southern Miss (32–8)	Arkansas (34–10)	Arkansas (36–12)	Stanford (33–14)	Oregon State (41–13)	Virginia Tech (41–12)	Arkansas (46–21)	4.
5.	Ole Miss	Vanderbilt (1–2)	Vanderbilt (5–2)	Stanford (8–3)	Oregon State (11–2)	Tennessee (19–1)	Florida State (16–7)	Oregon State (20–7)	Oklahoma State (23–9)	Miami (FL) (28–8)	Arkansas (31–9)	Virginia Tech (31–10)	Virginia Tech (33–10)	Texas Tech (35–16)	Texas A&M (35–17)	Texas A&M (37–18)	Stanford (47–18)	5.
6.	Stanford	Stanford (2–1)	Stanford (6–1)	Oklahoma State (6–4)	Notre Dame (11–1)	Oregon State (14–4)	Oklahoma State (18–6)	Oklahoma State (20–8)	Arkansas (23–7)	Southern Miss (27–8)	Stanford (24–12)	Miami (FL) (32–12)	Miami (FL) (35–12)	Texas A&M (33–16)	Miami (FL) (39–16)	Oklahoma State (39–20)	Notre Dame (41–17)	6.
7.	Oklahoma State	Mississippi State (1–2)	LSU (7–1)	Oregon State (9–1)	Tennessee (15–1)	Florida State (13–6)	Texas Tech (20–5)	Texas (21–9)	Texas (24–10)	Stanford (20–11)	Virginia Tech (28–9)	Southern Miss (34–10)	Louisville (33–13–1)	Arkansas (37–14)	Louisville (38–16–1)	Miami (FL) (39–18)	Auburn (43–22)	7.
8.	LSU	LSU (3–0)	NC State (8–0)	Florida State (7–4)	Florida State (10–5)	Florida (15–5)	Texas (19–7)	Miami (FL) (21–6)	Virginia (26–6)	Virginia Tech (23–9)	Oklahoma State (27–13)	UCLA (30–13)	Stanford (29–14)	Oklahoma State (34–17)	Texas Tech (36–18)	Louisville (38–18–1)	Texas (47–22)	8.
9.	Florida	NC State (3–0)	Mississippi State (4–3)	Notre Dame (8–1)	Florida (13–4)	Oklahoma State (14–6)	Vanderbilt (19–4)	Ole Miss (19–8)	Louisville (23–8)	Texas Tech (27–12)	Texas Tech (29–14)	Texas Tech (31–16)	Texas Tech (32–16)	Miami (FL) (37–14)	Oklahoma State (36–18)	Oklahoma (37–20)	Tennessee (57–9)	9.
10.	NC State	Florida State (3–0)	Florida State (5–2)	Tennessee (10–1)	Georgia Tech (13–3)	Virginia (19–1)	Ole Miss (16–7)	Texas State (23–6)	Notre Dame (20–5)	Texas (26–12)	Texas (30–13)	Louisville (31–12)	Texas A&M (30–16)	Louisville (35–15–1)	Maryland (44–10)	East Carolina (42–18)	Oregon State (48–18)	10.
11.	Florida State	Arizona (3–0)	Arizona (7–1)	Florida (10–3)	Oklahoma State (9–6)	Arizona (15–4)	Louisville (19–5)	Arizona (21–7)	Southern Miss (23–8)	Virginia (27–9)	Virginia (31–10)	Stanford (25–14)	Gonzaga (29–13)	Gonzaga (32–13)	Texas State (44–11)	North Carolina (38–19)	Virginia Tech (45–14)	11.
12.	East Carolina	Long Beach State (2–1)	Notre Dame (5–1)	LSU (9–3)	Stanford (9–5)	Notre Dame (12–4)	TCU (18–5)	Louisville (21–7)	UCLA (22–9)	Gonzaga (23–9)	Gonzaga (26–11)	Gonzaga (28–13)	Virginia (34–12)	Virginia (37–13)	Gonzaga (34–15)	Maryland (45–12)	Louisville (42–21–1)	12.
13.	Notre Dame	Notre Dame (2–1)	Oregon State (7–0)	Georgia Tech (10–2)	LSU (13–3)	North Carolina (17–3)	LSU (17–7)	Notre Dame (16–5)	Georgia (24–8)	UCLA (24–11)	UCLA (27–12)	Texas A&M (27–15)	UConn (40–8)	Texas State (41–11)	Arkansas (38–16)	Texas State (45–12)	East Carolina (46–21)	13.
14.	Texas Tech	Oregon State (4–0)	Florida (6–2)	Liberty (10–1)	Liberty (12–2)	Georgia Tech (15–5)	Florida (17–7)	Georgia (22–6)	Gonzaga (21–8)	Georgia (26–10)	Georgia (28–12)	Virginia (33–12)	Southern Miss (36–12)	Notre Dame (31–11)	Southern Miss (41–14)	Gonzaga (36–17)	North Carolina (42–22)	14.
15.	Arizona	Florida (1–2)	Georgia (7–0)	North Carolina (11–1)	North Carolina (14–2)	Liberty (14–4)	Arizona (17–7)	UCLA (19–8)	LSU (23–9)	UConn (28–7)	UConn (32–8)	UConn (37–8)	Texas State (38–11)	Maryland (41–10)	Virginia (38–15)	Southern Miss (43–16)	Southern Miss (47–19)	15.
16.	Georgia	Georgia (3–0)	TCU (6–1)	Arizona (9–3)	Arizona (12–4)	Texas Tech (17–4)	Notre Dame (12–5)	Vanderbilt (20–7)	Dallas Baptist (21–10)	Louisville (24–11)	Louisville (27–12)	Notre Dame (28–10)	Notre Dame (28–10)	UConn (42–10)	Notre Dame (33–13)	Texas (42–19)	UConn (50–16)	16.
17.	TCU	TCU (2–1)	Tennessee (7–0)	Texas Tech (10–2)	Texas Tech (14–3)	Georgia (16–4)	Miami (FL) (17–6)	Gonzaga (18–7)	Auburn (22–10)	Texas State (28–9)	Texas State (32–9)	Texas State (34–11)	LSU (32–15)	Southern Miss (38–14)	UC Santa Barbara (40–12)	Notre Dame (35–14)	Oklahoma State (42–22)	17.
18.	Oregon State	Tennessee (3–0)	Georgia Tech (7–1)	Tulane (10–2)	Clemson (14–1)	Louisville (16–4)	North Carolina (18–6)	Southern Miss (19–8)	UConn (24–7)	Notre Dame (21–8)	Notre Dame (26–8)	Maryland (35–9)	Maryland (37–10)	UC Santa Barbara (37–11)	TCU (35–18)	Florida (39–22)	Maryland (48–14)	18.
19.	Tennessee	Georgia Tech (3–0)	Texas Tech (5–2)	Clemson (11–0)	Virginia (14–1)	TCU (14–5)	Dallas Baptist (15–8)	LSU (19–9)	Texas State (24–9)	Auburn (24–12)	Auburn (29–12)	Auburn (31–14)	UC Santa Barbara (33–11)	Auburn (35–16)	Texas (39–17)	UCLA (38–22)	Texas State (47–14)	19.
20.	UC Irvine	Texas Tech (1–2)	Liberty (6–1)	Georgia (9–2)	Georgia (13–3)	Texas State (18–3)	Texas State (20–5)	Florida State (16–11)	Arizona (22–10)	Oregon (24–11)	TCU (27–13)	LSU (29–14)	Auburn (32–16)	Florida State (32–18)	UCLA (35–20)	UC Santa Barbara (43–12)	Miami (FL) (40–20)	20.
21.	Georgia Tech	Liberty (2–1)	Maryland (7–0)	TCU (8–3)	TCU (11–4)	LSU (15–5)	Oregon (16–7)	NC State (18–9)	Virginia Tech (20–8)	TCU (24–12)	Texas A&M (25–14)	Georgia Tech (27–18)	Florida State (28–17)	Vanderbilt (34–16)	LSU (37–18)	Georgia Southern (40–18)	Florida (42–24)	21.
22.	Dallas Baptist	Maryland (3–0)	Miami (FL) (7–1)	NC State (8–4)	Texas State (14–3)	Maryland (16–3)	Georgia Tech (16–9)	North Carolina (20–8)	Stanford (17–10)	LSU (23–12)	LSU (27–12)	Georgia (30–14)	Texas (34–17)	Texas (35–17)	Oklahoma (33–20)	TCU (36–20)	UCLA (40–24)	22.
23.	Duke	Duke (2–1)	Sacramento State (7–0)	Mississippi State (6–6)	Mississippi State (10–7)	Gonzaga (14–4)	Georgia (18–6)	TCU (19–9)	Florida (21–11)	Dallas Baptist (23–12)	Maryland (32–8)	Florida State (26–15)	UCLA (30–17)	UCLA (33–18)	East Carolina (38–18)	Arkansas (38–18)	TCU (38–22)	23.
24.	Long Beach State	Miami (FL) (4–0)	North Carolina (6–1)	Maryland (9–2)	Maryland (12–2)	Clemson (15–4)	Gonzaga (16–6)	Dallas Baptist (17–10)	Alabama (21–12)	Maryland (29–7)	Georgia Southern (27–12)	TCU (27–16)	Vanderbilt (31–15)	TCU (32–18)	Auburn (37–18)	Texas Tech (37–20)	Texas Tech (39–22)	24.
25.	Miami (FL)	East Carolina (0–3)	Long Beach State (2–4)	Gonzaga (8–2)	Gonzaga (11–4)	UConn (14–3)	UConn (17–5)	UConn (19–7)	Ole Miss (19–12)	Georgia Southern (24–11)	Wofford (30–10)	UC Santa Barbara (30–10)	Grand Canyon (33–16)	Grand Canyon (36–17)	Grand Canyon (39–17)	Auburn (37–19)	LSU (40–22)	25.
	Preseason Jan 18	Week 1 Feb 21	Week 2 Feb 28	Week 3 Mar 7	Week 4 Mar 14	Week 5 Mar 21	Week 6 Mar 28	Week 7 Apr 4	Week 8 Apr 11	Week 9 Apr 18	Week 10 Apr 25	Week 11 May 2	Week 12 May 9	Week 13 May 16	Week 14 May 23	Week 15 May 31	Final Jun 27	
		Dropped: No. 20 UC Irvine; No. 22 Dallas Baptist	Dropped: No. 23 Duke; No. 25 East Carolina	Dropped: No. 22 Miami (FL); No. 23 Sacramento State; No. 25 Long Beach State	Dropped: No. 18 Tulane; No. 22 NC State	Dropped: No. 12 Stanford; No. 23 Mississippi State	Dropped: No. 15 Liberty; No. 22 Maryland; No. 24 Clemson	Dropped: No. 14 Florida; No. 21 Oregon; No. 22 Georgia Tech	Dropped: No. 16 Vanderbilt; No. 20 Florida State; No. 21 NC State; No. 22 North Carolina; No. 23 TCU	Dropped: No. 20 Arizona; No. 23 Florida; No. 24 Alabama; No. 25 Ole Miss	Dropped: No. 20 Oregon; No. 23 Dallas Baptist	Dropped: No. 10 Texas; No. 24 Georgia Southern; No. 25 Wofford	Dropped: No. 21 Georgia Tech; No. 22 Georgia; No. 24 TCU	Dropped: No. 17 LSU	Dropped: No. 16 UConn; No. 20 Florida State; No. 21 Vanderbilt	Dropped: No. 15 Virginia; No. 21 LSU; No. 25 Grand Canyon	Dropped: No. 14 Gonzaga; No. 20 UC Santa Barbara; No. 21 Georgia Southern	
