= 2022 Big East Conference baseball tournament =

American college baseball tournament

- Teams: 4
- Format: Double-elimination tournament
- Finals site: Prasco Park; Mason, Ohio
- Champions: UConn (5th title)
- Winning coach: Jim Penders (3rd title)
- MVP: Luke Franzoni (Xavier)
- Television: Big East DN; FS2 (final)

2022 Big East Conference baseball standings
	Conf.						Overall
Team	W		L		T	PCT	W		L		T	PCT
No. 16 UConn ‍†‍‡‍^{y}	16	–	5	–	0	.762	50	–	16	–	0	.758
Creighton ‍‍‍	15	–	5	–	0	.750	31	–	18	–	0	.633
Xavier ‍‍‍	13	–	8	–	0	.619	33	–	27	–	0	.550
Georgetown ‍‍‍	11	–	10	–	0	.524	32	–	24	–	0	.571
Villanova ‍‍‍	8	–	12	–	0	.400	19	–	29	–	1	.398
St. John's ‍‍‍	7	–	12	–	1	.375	22	–	32	–	1	.409
Seton Hall ‍‍‍	7	–	13	–	0	.350	18	–	35	–	0	.340
Butler ‍‍‍	4	–	16	–	1	.214	20	–	35	–	1	.366
† – Conference champion ‡ – Tournament champion y – Invited to the NCAA tournament As of June 27, 2022; Rankings from D1Baseball

The 2022 Big East Conference baseball tournament was held at Prasco Park in Mason, Ohio, from May 26 through 29. The event, held at the end of the conference regular season, determined the champion of the Big East Conference for the 2022 season. For the fifth time, UConn won the double-elimination tournament and received the conference's automatic bid to the 2022 NCAA Division I baseball tournament.

== Format and seeding ==
The tournament will use a double-elimination format and feature the top four finishers of the Big East's eight teams.

Team	W	L	T	Pct.	GB	Seed
UConn	16	5	0	.762	—	1
Creighton	15	5	0	.750	.5	2
Xavier	13	8	0	.619	3	3
Georgetown	11	10	0	.524	5	4
Villanova	8	12	0	.400	7.5	—
St. John's	7	12	1	.375	8	—
Seton Hall	7	13	0	.350	8.5	—
Butler	4	16	1	.214	12	—

== Bracket ==
First round
1	UConn	4
4	Georgetown	0
3	Xavier	5
2	Creighton	6
Lower round 1
4	Georgetown	8
3	Xavier	16

Semi-finals
1	UConn	7
2	Creighton	1
Lower final
2	Creighton	8
3	Xavier	27

Finals
1	UConn	7	–
3	Xavier	2	–

== Game results ==
Date	Game	Winner	Score	Loser	Notes
May 26	Game 1	(1) UConn	4–0	(4) Georgetown	
May 27	Game 2	(2) Creighton	6–5	(3) Xavier	
May 28	Game 3	(3) Xavier	16–8	(4) Georgetown	Georgetown eliminated
May 28	Game 4	(1) UConn	7–1	(2) Creighton	
May 28	Game 5	(3) Xavier	27–8	(2) Creighton	Creighton eliminated
May 29	Game 6	(1) UConn	7–2	(3) Xavier	UConn wins Big East Tournament

== All-Tournament Team ==
The following players were named to the All-Tournament Team.

Position	Name	School	Class
P	Pat Gallagher	UConn	So
P	Austin Peterson	UConn	Jr
C	Jerry Huntzinger	Xavier	Grad
IF	Andrew Ciufo	Georgetown	Jr
IF	Luke Franzoni	Xavier	Sr
IF	Jack Housinger	Xavier	Sr
IF	Ben Huber	UConn	Grad
OF	Casey Dana	UConn	Grad
OF	Alan Roden	Creighton	So
OF	Andrew Walker	Xavier	Sr
DH	Korey Morton	UConn	So

=== Most Valuable Player ===
Luke Franzoni was named Tournament Most Valuable Player. Franzoni was a senior first baseman for Xavier.
