= 2022 Stanford Cardinal baseball team =

American college baseball season

2022 Stanford Cardinal baseball

Pac–12 regular season champions Pac-12 tournament champions NCAA Stanford Regional champions NCAA Stanford Super Regional champions

College World Series, 0–2
- Conference: Pac-12 Conference

Ranking
- Coaches: No. 6
- CB: No. 8
- Record: 47–18 (21–9 Pac-12)
- Head coach: David Esquer (5th season)
- Assistant coaches: Thomas Eager (5th season); Steve Rodriguez (3rd season); Andre Mercurio (1st season)
- Home stadium: Klein Field at Sunken Diamond

2022 Pac-12 Conference baseball standings
	Conf.						Overall
Team	W		L		T	PCT	W		L		T	PCT
No. 2 Stanford ‍†‍‡‍^{y}	21	–	9	–	0	.700	47	–	16	–	0	.746
No. 3 Oregon State ‍‍‍^{y}	20	–	10	–	0	.667	48	–	18	–	0	.727
No. 19 UCLA ‍‍‍^{y}	19	–	11	–	0	.633	40	–	24	–	0	.625
Oregon ‍‍‍^{y}	18	–	12	–	0	.600	36	–	25	–	0	.590
Arizona ‍‍‍^{y}	16	–	14	–	0	.533	39	–	25	–	0	.609
Washington ‍‍‍	14	–	16	–	0	.467	30	–	26	–	0	.536
California ‍‍‍	14	–	16	–	0	.467	29	–	27	–	0	.518
Arizona State ‍‍‍	13	–	17	–	0	.433	26	–	31	–	0	.456
Washington State ‍‍‍	12	–	18	–	0	.400	27	–	26	–	0	.509
Utah ‍‍‍	10	–	20	–	0	.333	26	–	27	–	1	.491
USC ‍‍‍	8	–	22	–	0	.267	25	–	28	–	0	.472
† – Conference champion ‡ – Tournament champion y – Invited to the NCAA tournament As of June 13, 2022; Rankings from D1Baseball

The 2022 Stanford Cardinal baseball team represented Stanford University in the 2022 NCAA Division I baseball season. The Cardinal played their home games at Klein Field at Sunken Diamond under fifth year coach David Esquer.

== Previous season ==
The Cardinal finished the regular season with a record of 33–14 and a conference record of 17–10. They earned the #9 national seed and the right to host a regional. They won their regional, and they won their Super Regional series against Texas Tech. The Cardinal earned a spot in the College World Series, but they lost two of three games and were knocked out ending their season with an overall record of 39–17.

=== 2021 MLB draft ===
The Cardinal had three players drafted in the 2021 MLB draft.

Player	Position	Round	Overall	MLB Team
Brendan Beck	Pitcher	2	55	New York Yankees
Tim Tawa	Second baseman	11	318	Arizona Diamondbacks
Christian Robinson	Outfield	15	457	Atlanta Braves

=== Recruits ===
College recruiting information
Name	Hometown	School	Height	Weight	Commit date
Braden Montgomery #7 OF/P	Madison, MS	Madison Central High School	6 ft 2 in (1.88 m)	201 lb (91 kg)	
Braden Montgomery #7 OF/P	Recruit ratings: No ratings found				
Charlie Saum #12 C/1B, OF	Thousand Oaks, CA	Thousand Oaks High School	5 ft 11 in (1.80 m)	180 lb (82 kg)	
Charlie Saum #12 C/1B, OF	Recruit ratings: No ratings found				
Trevor Haskins #79 SS/2B, 3B	San Jose, CA	Valley Christian Schools	6 ft 0 in (1.83 m)	180 lb (82 kg)	
Trevor Haskins #79 SS/2B, 3B	Recruit ratings: No ratings found				
Temo Becerra # 192 SS/P	Clovis, CA	Buchanan High School	6 ft 1 in (1.85 m)	175 lb (79 kg)	
Temo Becerra # 192 SS/P	Recruit ratings: No ratings found				
Brett Blair #38 3B/SS	Gainesville, FL	Buchholz High School	6 ft 0 in (1.83 m)	208 lb (94 kg)	
Brett Blair #38 3B/SS	Recruit ratings: No ratings found				
Saborn Campbell #128 OF/2B	Bloomfield Hills, MI	Detroit Country Day School	6 ft 0 in (1.83 m)	185 lb (84 kg)	
Saborn Campbell #128 OF/2B	Recruit ratings: No ratings found				
Gain Nalu #61 P/1B	La Mesa, CA	Cathedral Catholic High School	6 ft 1 in (1.85 m)	205 lb (93 kg)	
Gain Nalu #61 P/1B	Recruit ratings: No ratings found				
Jake Sapien #60 3B/1B, P, S	Atwater, CA	Buhach Colony High School	6 ft 3 in (1.91 m)	215 lb (98 kg)	
Jake Sapien #60 3B/1B, P, S	Recruit ratings: No ratings found				
Ty Uber #282 P/OF	Cameron Park, CA	Ponderosa High School	6 ft 4 in (1.93 m)	230 lb (100 kg)	
Ty Uber #282 P/OF	Recruit ratings: No ratings found				
Overall recruit ranking:
Note: In many cases, Scout, Rivals, 247Sports, On3, and ESPN may conflict in their listings of height and weight.; In these cases, the average was taken. ESPN grades are on a 100-point scale.; Sources:

== Personnel ==
=== Roster ===
2022 Stanford Cardinal roster
Pitchers: 13 – Justin Moore – (redshirt) Junior; 18 – Cody Jensen – (redshirt) Junior; 20 – Nathan Fleischli – Junior; 23 – Joey Dixon – Sophomore; 26 – Quinn Mathews – Junior; 28 – Alex Williams – Senior; 30 – Brandt Pancer – Sophomore; 34 – Ryan Bruno – Sophomore; 36 – Ty Uber – Freshman; 37 – Tommy O'Rourke – Sophomore; 40 – Nicolas Lopez – (redshirt) Junior; 41 – Matt Swartz – (redshirt) Sophomore; 45 – Max Meier – Junior; 46 – Jaden Bruno – (redshirt) Freshman; 49 – Drew Dowd – Sophomore; 50 – Gavin Nalu – Freshman	Catchers: 11 – Alberto Rios – Sophomore; 16 – Vincent Martinez – Senior; 21 – Charlie Saum – Freshman; 25 – Kody Huff – Junior; Infielders: 1 – Owen Cobb – Junior; 2 – Drew Bowser – Sophomore; 5 – Austin Kretzschmar – Senior; 10 – Adam Crampton – Junior; 24 – Trevor Haskins – Freshman; 27 – Temo Becerra – Freshman; 31 – Carter Graham – 'Sophomore; 33 – Brett Barrera – Junior	Outfielders: 4 – Saborn Campbell – Freshman; 7 – Brock Jones – Junior; 15 – Grant Burton – Senior; 22 – Eddie Park – Sophomore; 29 – Cole Hinkleman – Junior; 42 – Joe Lomuscio – Graduate Student; Utility: 6 – Braden Montgomery (OF/P) – Freshman; 12 – Tommy Troy (INF/OF) – Sophomore; 19 – Harry Gargus (INF/OF) – Junior; 44 – Brett Blair (INF/OF) – Freshman; 39 – Jake Sapien (P/INF) – Freshman

=== Coaching staff ===
2021 Stanford Cardinal coaching staff
Name	Position
David Esquer	Clarke and Elizabeth Nelson Director of Baseball
Thomas Eager	Kathy Wolff Assistant Baseball Coach
Steve Rodriguez	Assistant Coach
Andre Mercurio	Assistant Coach
Jeanette Morganti	Director of Baseball Operations
CJ Baker	Video, Technology and Analytics Coordinator

== Pac–12 media poll ==
Pac–12 media poll
Predicted finish	Team	Votes (1st place)
1	Stanford	98 (8)
2	Oregon State	84 (1)
3	Arizona	77
4	UCLA	75 (2)
5	Oregon	70
6	California	53
7	Arizona State	46
8	USC	34
9	Washington State	34
10	Washington	19
11	Utah	15

=== Preseason All-Americans ===
First Team All-Americans
Player	No.	Position	Class	Selector(s)
Brock Jones	7	OF	Junior	Collegiate Baseball

=== Award watch lists ===
Award	Player	Position	Year
Golden Spikes Award	Brock Jones	OF	Junior

== Schedule and results ==
Legend
	Stanford win
	Stanford loss
	Postponement
**Bold**	Stanford team member

2022 Stanford Cardinal baseball game log
Regular season
February (6–2)

Date	Opponent	Rank	Site/stadium	Score	Win	Loss	Save	TV	Attendance	Overall record	Pac12 record
Feb. 18	Cal State Fullerton*	No. 6	Klein Field at Sunken Diamond • Stanford, CA	**W** 1–0	**Williams** (1–0)	Repetti (0–1)	**Montgomery** (1)	Stanford Live Stream2	913	1–0	
Feb. 19	Cal State Fullerton*	No. 6	Klein Field at Sunken Diamond • Stanford, CA	**L** 0–11	Stultz (1–0)	**Mathews** (0–1)		Stanford Live Stream2	2,304	1–1	
Feb. 20	Cal State Fullerton*	No. 6	Klein Field at Sunken Diamond • Stanford, CA	**W** 11–1	**Dowd** (1–0)	Rodriguez (0–1)		Stanford Live Stream2	1,488	2–1	
Feb. 22	Santa Clara*	No. 6	Klein Field at Sunken Diamond • Stanford, CA	**W** 5–0	**Uber** (1–0)	Reelfs (0–1)		Pac-12 Bay Area	1,203	3–1	
Karbach Round Rock Classic
Feb. 25	vs. Louisiana*	No. 6	Dell Diamond • Round Rock, TX	**W** 5–1	**Williams** (2–0)	Ray (0–1)		FloBaseball		4–1	
Feb. 27	vs. Indiana*	No. 6	Dell Diamond • Round Rock, TX	**W** 13–0	**Dowd** (2–0)	Sharp (0–1)	**Dixon** (1)	FloBaseball		5–1	
Feb. 27	vs. No. 2 Arkansas*	No. 6	Dell Diamond • Round Rock, TX	**W** 5–0	**Mathews** (1–1)	Smith (1–1)		FloBaseball		6–1	
Feb. 28	at UTSA*	No. 6	Roadrunner Field • San Antonio, TX	**L** 5–6^{10}	Chomko (1–0)	**O'Rourke** (0–1)		Live Stream	408	6–2	

March (6–6)

Date	Opponent	Rank	Site/stadium	Score	Win	Loss	Save	TV	Attendance	Overall record	Pac12 record
Mar. 4	Cal State Northridge*	No. 6	Klein Field at Sunken Diamond • Stanford, CA	**L** 3–9	Traxel (2–1)	**Williams** (2–1)		Stanford Live Stream	805	6–3	
Mar. 5	Cal State Northridge*	No. 6	Klein Field at Sunken Diamond • Stanford, CA	**W** 6–2	**Mathews** (2–1)	Sodersten (2–1)		Stanford Live Stream	1,149	7–3	
Mar. 6	Cal State Northridge*	No. 6	Klein Field at Sunken Diamond • Stanford, CA	**W** 3–2	**Dixon** (1–0)	Wentz (1–1)	**Montgomery** (2)	Stanford Live Stream	1,161	8–3	
Mar. 11	Oregon	No. 5	Klein Field at Sunken Diamond • Stanford, CA	**L** 3–4	Churby (1–0)	**O'Rourke** (0–2)	Somers (1)	Stanford Live Stream	1,309	8–4	0–1
Mar. 12	Oregon	No. 5	Klein Field at Sunken Diamond • Stanford, CA	**L** 13–16	Britton (2–0)	**Montgomery** (0–1)		Stanford Live Stream	1,511	8–5	0–2
Mar. 13	Oregon	No. 5	Klein Field at Sunken Diamond • Stanford, CA	**W** 10–6	**Dowd** (3–0)	Brandenburg (1–1)		Stanford Live Stream	1,603	9–5	1–2
Mar. 19	at No. 16 Arizona	No. 12	Hi Corbett Field • Tucson, AZ	**L** 2–3	Nichols (3–0)	**O'Rourke** (0–3)	Long (1)	P12N	4,330	9–6	1–3
Mar. 20	at No. 16 Arizona	No. 12	Hi Corbett Field • Tucson, AZ	**L** 5–6	Christian (2–1)	**Dixon** (1–1)		P12N (Arizona)	3,305	9–7	1–4
Mar. 21	at No. 16 Arizona	No. 12	Hi Corbett Field • Tucson, AZ	**L** 3–10	Flanagan (3–1)	**Uber** (1–1)		P12N	2,618	9–8	1–5
Mar. 25	Washington State		Klein Field at Sunken Diamond • Stanford, CA	**W** 8–7^{12}	**Bruno** (1–0)	Kaelber (0–1)		Stanford Live Stream	1,179	10–8	2–5
Mar. 26	Washington State		Klein Field at Sunken Diamond • Stanford, CA	**W** 7–1	**Mathews** (3–1)	McMillan (1–2)		Stanford Live Stream	1,313	11–8	3–5
Mar. 27	Washington State		Klein Field at Sunken Diamond • Stanford, CA	**W** 8–3	**Dowd** (4–0)	Cottrell (1–5)		Stanford Live Stream	1,274	12–8	4–5

April (13–5)

Date	Opponent	Rank	Site/stadium	Score	Win	Loss	Save	TV	Attendance	Overall record	Pac12 record
Apr. 1	at No. 3 Oregon State		Goss Stadium at Coleman Field • Corvallis, OR	**W** 1–0^{10}	**Dixon** (2–1)	Sebby (1–1)	**Mathews** (1)	P12N (Oregon)	3,756	13–8	5–5
Apr. 2	at No. 3 Oregon State		Goss Stadium at Coleman Field • Corvallis, OR	**L** 2–3^{11}	Brown (3–0)	**Dixon** (2–2)		P12N	3,918	13–9	5–6
Apr. 3	at No. 3 Oregon State		Goss Stadium at Coleman Field • Corvallis, OR	**W** 8–5	**Mathews** (4–1)	Verburg (2–3)		P12N (Oregon)	3,735	14–9	6–6
Apr. 5	Saint Mary's*		Klein Field at Sunken Diamond • Stanford, CA	**L** 1–8	Linchey (2–0)	**Montgomery** (0–2)		Stanford Live Stream2	891	14–10	
Apr. 8	Arizona State		Klein Field at Sunken Diamond • Stanford, CA	**W** 8–0	**Williams** (3–1)	Luckham (4–2)		Stanford Live Stream2	1,550	15–10	7–6
Apr. 9	Arizona State		Klein Field at Sunken Diamond • Stanford, CA	**W** 10–6	**O'Rourke** (1–3)	Levine (2–2)	**Mathews** (2)	Stanford Live Stream2	1,681	16–10	8–6
Apr. 10	Arizona State		Klein Field at Sunken Diamond • Stanford, CA	**W** 16–10	**Mathews** (5–1)	Webster (1–3)		Stanford Live Stream	1,969	17–10	9–6
Apr. 12	San Francisco*	No. 22	Klein Field at Sunken Diamond • Stanford, CA	**W** 6–5	**Bruno** (2–0)	Lombard (2–3)		Stanford Live Stream	969	18–10	
Apr. 14	at No. 12 UCLA	No. 22	Jackie Robinson Stadium • Los Angeles, CA	**W** 9–1	**Williams** (4–1)	Brooks (5–3)		P12N	641	19–10	10–6
Apr. 15	at No. 12 UCLA	No. 22	Jackie Robinson Stadium • Los Angeles, CA	**L** 4–5	Flanagan (3–0)	**O'Rourke** (1–4)		ESPN2	1,494	19–11	10–7
Apr. 16	at No. 12 UCLA	No. 22	Jackie Robinson Stadium • Los Angeles, CA	**W** 11–0	**Mathews** (6–1)	Jump (1–1)		P12N	1,334	20–11	11–7
Apr. 19	at Cal Poly*	No. 7	Baggett Stadium • San Luis Obispo, CA	**W** 10–8	**Jensen** (1–0)	Larkin (2–2)	**Bruno** (1)	ESPN+	2,738	21–11	
Apr. 22	vs. Grand Canyon*	No. 7	Tony Gwynn Stadium • San Diego, CA	**W** 11–1	**Williams** (5–1)	Avitia (4–4)			219	22–11	
Apr. 23	vs. Grand Canyon*	No. 7	Tony Gwynn Stadium • San Diego, CA	**L** 1–5	Reilly (5–1)	**O'Rourke** (1–5)			311	22–12	
Apr. 23	at San Diego State*	No. 7	Tony Gwynn Stadium • San Diego, CA	**W** 9–6	**Uber** (2–1)	Fondtain (1–5)	**Mathews** (3)		712	23–12	
Apr. 24	at San Diego State*	No. 7	Tony Gwynn Stadium • San Diego, CA	**W** 6–4	**Bruno** (3–0)	Guzman (1–3)			822	24–12	
Apr. 29	at Washington	No. 6	Husky Ballpark • Seattle, WA	**L** 3–4	Raeth (5–4)	**Dixon** (2–3)		Washington Live Stream-2	908	24–13	11–8
Apr. 30	at Washington	No. 6	Husky Ballpark • Seattle, WA	**W** 6–2	**Dowd** (5–0)	Kirchoff (2–3)	**Pancer** (1)	Washington Live Stream-2	1,332	25–13	12–8

May (12–1)

Date	Opponent	Rank	Site/stadium	Score	Win	Loss	Save	TV	Attendance	Overall record	Pac12 record
May 1	at Washington	No. 6	Husky Ballpark • Seattle, WA	**L** 10–11	Velazquez (1–0)	**Bruno** (3–1)		Washington Live Stream-2	1,210	25–14	12–9
May 3	UC Davis*	No. 11	Klein Field at Sunken Diamond • Stanford, CA	**W** 16–6	**Dixon** (3–3)	Riccomini (1–5)		Stanford Live Stream	948	26–14	
May 6	California	No. 11	Klein Field at Sunken Diamond • Stanford, CA	**W** 6–2	**Williams** (6–1)	Zobac (2–3)		P12N Bay Area	2,242	27–14	13–9
May 7	California	No. 11	Klein Field at Sunken Diamond • Stanford, CA	**W** 8–7	**Mathews** (7–1)	White (1–6)		P12N Bay Area	2,634	28–14	14–9
May 8	California	No. 11	Klein Field at Sunken Diamond • Stanford, CA	**W** 11–3	**Uber** (3–1)	Stoutenborough (2–3)		P12N Bay Area	1,725	29–14	15–9
May 10	at San Francisco	No. 9	Dante Benedetti Diamond at Max Ulrich Field • San Francisco, CA	**W** 9–7	**Meier** (1–0)	Washburn (0–1)	**Mathews** (4)	WCC Ntwork	127	30–14	
May 13	at Utah	No. 9	Smith's Ballpark • Salt Lake City, UT	**W** 5–0	**Williams** (7–1)	Sox (4–4)		Pac-12 Insider	1,454	31–14	16–9
May 14	at Utah	No. 9	Smith's Ballpark • Salt Lake City, UT	**W** 8–2	**Dixon** (4–3)	Harris (1–3)		Utah Live Stream	1,517	32–14	17–9
May 15	at Utah	No. 9	Smith's Ballpark • Salt Lake City, UT	**W** 7–6	**Mathews** (8–1)	McCleve (2–2)		Utah Live Stream	1,312	33–14	18–9
May 17	Santa Clara*	No. 4	Stephen Schott Stadium • Santa Clara, CA	**W** 19–0	**O'Rourke** (2–5)	Reelfs (4–7)			476	34–14	
May 19	USC	No. 4	Klein Field at Sunken Diamond • Stanford, CA	**W** 7–1	**Williams** (8–1)	Agassi (3–2)		P12N Bay Area	1,598	35–14	19–9
May 20	USC	No. 4	Klein Field at Sunken Diamond • Stanford, CA	**W** 22–3	**Dixon** (5–3)	Esqueda (1–6)		P12N	1,707	36–14	20–9
May 21	USC	No. 4	Klein Field at Sunken Diamond • Stanford, CA	**W** 12–5	**Dowd** (6–0)	Hurley (6–2)	**Mathews** (5)	P12N Bay Area	1,989	37–14	21–9

Postseason
Pac-12 Baseball Tournament (4–0)

Date	Opponent	Rank	Site/stadium	Score	Win	Loss	Save	TV	Attendance	Overall record	Tournament record
May 25	(8) Arizona State	No. 3 (1)	Scottsdale Stadium • Scottsdale, AZ	**W** 6–3	**Bruno** (4–1)	Pivaroff (1–3)	**Mathews** (6)	P12N	2,044	38–14	1–0
May 26	(5) Arizona	No. 3 (1)	Scottsdale Stadium • Scottsdale, AZ	**W** 15–8	**Pancer** (1–0)	Irvin (4–4)		P12N	3,174	39–14	2–0
May 28	(5) Arizona	No. 3 (1)	Scottsdale Stadium • Scottsdale, AZ	**W** 5–4	**Dixon** (6–3)	Susac (4–3)	**Mathews** (7)	P12N	3,321	40–14	3–0
May 29	No. 4 (2) Oregon State	No. 3 (1)	Scottsdale Stadium • Scottsdale, AZ	**W** 9–5	**Bruno** (5–1)	Sebby (1–2)	**Pancer** (2)	ESPN2	4,024	41–14	4–0

Stanford Regional (4–1)

Date	Opponent	Rank	Site/stadium	Score	Win	Loss	Save	TV	Attendance	Overall record	Regional record
June 3	(4) Binghamton	No. 2 (1)	Klein Field at Sunken Diamond • Stanford, CA	**W** 20–7	**O'Rourke** (3–5)	Babalis (4–7)		ESPN+	1,744	42–14	1–0
June 4	(2) Texas State	No. 2 (1)	Klein Field at Sunken Diamond • Stanford, CA	**L** 2–5	Wells (9–1)	**Williams** (8–2)	Stivors (18)	ESPNU	2,456	42–15	1–1
June 5	(3) UC Santa Barbara	No. 2 (1)	Klein Field at Sunken Diamond • Stanford, CA	**W** 8–4	**Mathews** (9–1)	Welch (4–4)		ESPN+	1,774	43–15	2–1
June 5	(2) Texas State	No. 2 (1)	Klein Field at Sunken Diamond • Stanford, CA	**W** 8–4	**Uber** (4–1)	Robie (4–1)		ESPNU	1,615	44–15	3–1
June 6	(2) Texas State	No. 2 (1)	Klein Field at Sunken Diamond • Stanford, CA	**W** 4–3	**Pancer** (2–0)	Wells (8–3)		ESPN2	2,647	45–15	4–1

Stanford Super Regional (2–1)

Date	Opponent	Rank	Site/stadium	Score	Win	Loss	Save	TV	Attendance	Overall record	Super Regional record
June 11	UConn	No. 2	Klein Field at Sunken Diamond • Stanford, CA	**L** 12–13	Gallagher (11–3)	**Williams** (8–3)		ESPNU	2,673	45–16	0–1
June 12	UConn	No. 2	Klein Field at Sunken Diamond • Stanford, CA	**W** 8–2	**Pancer** (3–0)	Peterson (11–3)	**Mathews** (8)	ESPN2	2,756	46–16	1–1
June 12	UConn	No. 2	Klein Field at Sunken Diamond • Stanford, CA	**W** 10–5	**Bruno** (6–1)	Coe (2–2)	**Mathews** (9)	ESPN2	2,689	47–16	2–1

College World Series (0–2)

Date	Opponent	Rank	Site/stadium	Score	Win	Loss	Save	TV	Attendance	Overall record	College World Series
June 18	Arkansas	No. 2	Charles Schwab Field Omaha • Omaha, NE	**L** 2–17	Noland (8–5)	**Williams** (8–4)		ESPN	24,337	47–17	0–1
June 20	Auburn	No. 2	Charles Schwab Field Omaha • Omaha, NE	**L** 2–6	Bright (5–4)	**Mathews** (9–2)	Burkhalter (16)	ESPN	23,594	47–18	0–2

Source: Rankings are based on the team's current ranking in the D1Baseball poll. Parentheses indicate tournament seedings.

== Stanford Super Regional ==
Stanford Regional Teams
(1) No. 2 Stanford Cardinal	(2) Texas State Bobcats	(3) UC Santa Barbara Gauchos	(4) Binghamton Bearcats

Regional	Regional
1	Stanford	20
4	Binghamton	7
1	Stanford	2
2	Texas State	5
3	UC Santa Barbara	3
2	Texas State	7
Stanford Regional – Klein Field at Sunken Diamond
4	Binghamton	4
3	UC Santa Barbara	9
3	UC Santa Barbara	4
1	Stanford	8
1	Maryland	23
4	LIU	2
1	Maryland	5
3	UConn	10
3	UConn	8
2	Wake Forest	7
College Park Regional – Bob "Turtle" Smith Stadium
4	LIU	4
2	Wake Forest	10
2	Wake Forest	5
1	Maryland	10

Regional Final
2	Texas State	4	3
1	Stanford	8	4
3	UConn	6^{11}	11
1	Maryland	7	8

Super Regional
2	Stanford	12	8	10
UConn	13	2	5

== College World Series ==
2022 College World Series Teams
Notre Dame Fighting Irish	(9) Texas Longhorns	(5) Texas A&M Aggies	Oklahoma Sooners	(2) Stanford Cardinal	Arkansas Razorbacks	Ole Miss Rebels	(14) Auburn Tigers

First round	Second round
Notre Dame	7
9	Texas	3
Notre Dame	2
Oklahoma	6
5	Texas A&M	8
Oklahoma	13
Bracket 1
9	Texas	2
5	Texas A&M	10
5	Texas A&M	5
Notre Dame	1
2	Stanford	2
Arkansas	17
Arkansas	5
Ole Miss	13
Ole Miss	5
14	Auburn	1
Bracket 2
2	Stanford	2
14	Auburn	6
14	Auburn	1
Arkansas	11

Semifinals
Oklahoma	5	–
5	Texas A&M	1	–
Ole Miss	2	2
Arkansas	3	0

Finals
Oklahoma	3	2	–
Ole Miss	10	4	–

== Awards and honors ==
National honors
Honors	Player	Position	Ref.
Collegiate Baseball First Team	Alex Williams	P	
Collegiate Baseball Third Team	Carter Graham	1B	
CoSIDA Academic All-American First Team	Alex Williams	P	
CoSIDA Academic All-American Second Team	Brock Jones	OF	
Collegiate Baseball Freshman All-Americans	Braden Montgomery	OF/P	
NCBWA Freshman All-American Team	Braden Montgomery	OF/P	
ABCA/Rawlings All-America Third Team	Alex Williams	P	
ABCA/Rawlings All-America Third Team	Brock Jones	OF	
Senior CLASS Award All-American First Team	Alex Williams	P	

Conference honors
Honors	Player	Position	Ref.
Pac-12 Coach of the Year	David Esquer	Coach	
Pac-12 Pitcher of the Year	Alex Williams	P	
Pac-12 Freshman of the Year	Braden Montgomery	OF	
Pac-12 Defensive Player of the Year	Adam Crampton	SS	
All-Pac-12 First Team	Brett Barrera	INF	
All-Pac-12 First Team	Carter Graham	INF	
All-Pac-12 First Team	Kody Huff	C	
All-Pac-12 First Team	Brock Jones	OF	
All-Pac-12 First Team	Alex Williams	P	
Pac-12 All-Defensive Team	Adam Crampton	SS	
Pac-12 All-Defensive Team	Brock Jones	OF	
Pac-12 All-Defensive Team	Alex Williams	P	
Pac-12 Baseball Scholar-Athlete of the Year	Alex Williams	P	

Weekly honors
Honors	Player	Position	Date Awarded	Ref.
Pac-12 Baseball Player of the Week	Brett Barrera	INF	February 28, 2022	
Pac-12 Baseball Player of the Week	Brock Jones	OF	May 23, 2022	
Pac-12 Baseball Pitcher of the Week	Quinn Mathews	P	February 28, 2022	
Pac-12 Baseball Pitcher of the Week	Quinn Mathews	P	March 28, 2022	
Pac-12 Baseball Pitcher of the Week	Quinn Mathews	P	April 18, 2022	
Pac-12 Baseball Pitcher of the Week	Alex Williams	P	April 11, 2022	
Pac-12 Baseball Pitcher of the Week	Alex Williams	P	May 9, 2002	
College Baseball Foundation National Pitcher of the Week	Quinn Mathews	P	March 1, 2022	
Collegiate Baseball National Pitcher of the Week	Quinn Mathews	P	April 4, 2022	
Collegiate Baseball National Player of the Week	Vincent Martinez	C	April 11, 2022	
Collegiate Baseball National Player of the Week	Brock Jones	OF	May 23, 2022	

== Rankings ==
Ranking movements Legend: ██ Increase in ranking ██ Decrease in ranking
	Week																
Poll	Pre	1	2	3	4	5	6	7	8	9	10	11	12	13	14	15	Final
Coaches'	5	5*	3	5	11	24			23	12	9	11	7	4	4	4	6
Baseball America	7	5	2	2	10	18	24	14	11	6	4	10	9	5	4	2	7
Collegiate Baseball^	5	5	2	5	14			16	15	6	4	12	10	4	3	2	8
NCBWA†	5	4	3	4	11	19	20	22	18	8	5	12	9	8	3	2	7
D1Baseball	6	6	6	4	12				22	7	6	11	8	4	3	2	5

^ Collegiate Baseball ranked 40 teams in their preseason poll, but only ranked 30 teams weekly during the season.
† NCBWA ranks 30 teams in their preseason poll, but only ranks 25 teams weekly during the season.
* A new poll was not released for this week, so for comparison purposes, the previous week's ranking is inserted in this week's slot.
