= 2022 UConn Huskies baseball team =

American college baseball season

2022 UConn Huskies baseball

Big East Conference regular season champion Big East tournament champion NCAA College Park Regional champion

NCAA Stanford Super Regional, 1–2
- Conference: Big East Conference
- Record: 50–16 (16–5 Big East)
- Head coach: Jim Penders (19th season)
- Assistant coaches: Jeff Hourigan (11th season); Joshua McDonald (11th season); Chris Podeszwa (19th season)
- Home stadium: Elliot Ballpark

2022 Big East Conference baseball standings
	Conf.						Overall
Team	W		L		T	PCT	W		L		T	PCT
No. 16 UConn ‍†‍‡‍^{y}	16	–	5	–	0	.762	50	–	16	–	0	.758
Creighton ‍‍‍	15	–	5	–	0	.750	31	–	18	–	0	.633
Xavier ‍‍‍	13	–	8	–	0	.619	33	–	27	–	0	.550
Georgetown ‍‍‍	11	–	10	–	0	.524	32	–	24	–	0	.571
Villanova ‍‍‍	8	–	12	–	0	.400	19	–	29	–	1	.398
St. John's ‍‍‍	7	–	12	–	1	.375	22	–	32	–	1	.409
Seton Hall ‍‍‍	7	–	13	–	0	.350	18	–	35	–	0	.340
Butler ‍‍‍	4	–	16	–	1	.214	20	–	35	–	1	.366
† – Conference champion ‡ – Tournament champion y – Invited to the NCAA tournament As of June 27, 2022; Rankings from D1Baseball

The 2022 UConn Huskies baseball team represented the University of Connecticut in the 2022 NCAA Division I baseball season. The Huskies played their home games at Elliot Ballpark on campus in Storrs, Connecticut. The team was coached by Jim Penders, in his 19th season at UConn. They played as members of the Big East Conference.

The Huskies won the Big East Regular season and Tournament titles for the second year in a row. They were invited to the 2022 NCAA Division I baseball tournament where they won the College Park Regional and surpassed the 2010 Huskies for most wins in program history. They were defeated two games to one by second overall seed Stanford in the Stanford Super Regional, ending their season.

== Previous season ==
The Huskies compiled a 34–19 record, 13–4 in the Big East, finishing in first place and winning the Big East tournament. They finished with a record of 1–2 in the NCAA South Bend Regional.

== Personnel ==
=== Roster ===
2022 Connecticut Huskies roster
Pitchers: 11 - Joe Wozny - Freshman; 15 - Hector Alejandro - Sophomore; 18 - Jack Sullivan - Freshman; 20 - Brendan O'Donnell - Sophomore; 21 - Reggie Crawford - Sophomore; 22 - Ian Cooke - Freshman; 23 - Sam Favieri - Sophomore; 24 - Cole Chudoba - Graduate Student; 31 - Jimmy Wang - (redshirt) Junior; 32 - Mitchell Pascarella - Freshman; 34 - Brady Afthim - Freshman; 36 - Justin Willis - Senior; 37 - Kenny Campbell - (redshirt) Senior; 38 - Garrett Coe - Sophomore; 39 - Bobby McBride - Sophomore; 40 - Braden Quinn - Freshman; 41 - Ramsey Collins - Freshman; 42 - Pat Gallagher - Sophomore; 45 - Curren Larson - Junior; 46 - Enzo Stefanoni - Graduate Student; 47 - Erik Stock - Senior; 49 - Austin Peterson - Senior; 50 - Devin Kirby - Senior; 51 - Leo Socci - Sophomore; 53 - Thomas Ellisen - Freshman	Catchers: 2 - Ryan Hyde - Sophomore; 5 - Matt Garbowski - Freshman; 43 - Matt Donlan - (redshirt) Junior; Outfielders: 3 - Zach Stephenson - Freshman; 4 - Korey Morton - Sophomore; 9 - Casey Dana - Graduate Student; 12 - Kevin Ferrer - (redshirt) Sophomore; 13 - Phoenix Billings - Sophomore; 26 - T.C. Simmons - (redshirt) Junior	Infielders: 1 - Bryan Padilla - Sophomore; 7 - Christian Fedko - Senior; 8 - Zach Bushling - Senior; 10 - David Smith - (redshirt) Sophomore; 30 - Chris Brown - Sophomore; 44 - Ben Huber - Graduate Student; 52 - Jack Petersen - Freshman; 54 - Jackson Ferrigno - Freshman

=== Coaches ===
2022 Connecticut Huskies baseball coaching staff
- 16 – Jim Penders – Head coach – 19th season
- 29 – Jeff Hourigan – Assistant coach/recruiting coordinator – 11th season
- 33 – Joshua MacDonald – Assistant coach – 11th season
- 14 – Chris Podeszwa – Volunteer assistant coach – 19th season

== Schedule ==
Legend
	UConn win
	UConn loss
	Cancellation
**Bold**	UConn team member
*	Non-Conference game

2022 Connecticut Huskies baseball game log
Regular season

February (5–1)
Date	Opponent	Rank	Site/stadium	Score	Win	Loss	Save	Attendance	Overall record	BE Record
Feb 18	at South Florida*		USF Baseball Stadium • Tampa, FL	**W** 5–4^{10}	**Cooke (1–0)**	Kerkering (0–1)	**Willis (1)**	1,637	1–0	
Feb 19	vs Charlotte*		USF Baseball Stadium • Tampa, FL	**L** 3–7	Rossi (1–0)	**Gallagher (0–1)**	Bruce (1)		1–1	
Feb 20	vs Louisville*		USF Baseball Stadium • Tampa, FL	**W** 9–2	**Stefanoni (1–0)**	Ferris (0–1)	None		2–1	
Feb 25	at North Florida*		Harmon Stadium • Jacksonville, FL	**W** 11–5	**Peterson (1–0)**	Roca (0–2)	**Cooke (1)**	423	3–1	
Feb 26	at North Florida*		Harmon Stadium • Jacksonville, FL	**W** 11–0	**Gallagher (1–1)**	Tadlock (0–1)	None	396	4–1	
Feb 27	at North Florida*		Harmon Stadium • Jacksonville, FL	**W** 5–3	**Willis (1–0)**	Chappell (0–1)	None	368	5–1	

March (12–5)
Date	Opponent	Rank	Site/stadium	Score	Win	Loss	Save	Attendance	Overall record	BE Record
Mar 4	at FIU*		Infinity Insurance Park • Miami, FL	**W** 4–2	**Cooke (2–0)**	Tiburcio (1–1)	**Willis (2)**	515	6–1	
Mar 5	at FIU*		Infinity Insurance Park • Miami, FL	**W** 9–1	**Gallagher (2–1)**	Martin (0–2)	None		7–1	
Mar 6	at FIU*		Infinity Insurance Park • Miami, FL	**W** 15–0	**Stefanoni (2–0)**	Cabarcas (2–1)	None	416	8–1	
Mar 8	Hartford*		Elliot Ballpark • Storrs, CT	**W** 8–3	**Alejandro (1–0)**	Blaisell (0–3)	None	983	9–1	
Mar 11	at Pepperdine*		Eddy D. Field Stadium • Malibu, CA	**W** 6–2	**Peterson (2–0)**	Llewellyn (1–2)	None	387	10–1	
Mar 12	at Pepperdine*		Eddy D. Field Stadium • Malibu, CA	**W** 3–2	**Gallagher (3–1)**	Hinkel (1–1)	**Willis (3)**	387	11–1	
Mar 13	at Pepperdine*		Eddy D. Field Stadium • Malibu, CA	**L** 5–6	Morrow (2–0)	**Stefanoni (2–1)**	Georges (4)	398	11–2	
Mar 15	at No. 25 Southern California*		Dedeaux Field • Los Angeles, CA	**W** 7–1	**Cooke (3–0)**	Hoopingarner (0–1)	None	311	12–2	
Mar 16	at Long Beach State*		Blair Field • Long Beach, CA	**L** 1–7	Voelker (2–0)	**Alejandro (1–1)**	None	1,457	12–3	
Mar 19	at UC San Diego*		Triton Ballpark • La Jolla, CA	**W** 8–7	**Peterson (3–0)**	Tonnerre (0–1)	**Coe (1)**	388	13–3	
Mar 20	at UC San Diego*		Triton Ballpark • La Jolla, CA	**W** 3–2	**Gallagher (4–1)**	Conlon (1–4)	**O'Donnell (1)**	308	14–3	
Mar 21	at UC San Diego*	No. 25	Triton Ballpark • La Jolla, CA	**L** 7–8	Martinez (2–1)	**O'Donnell (0–1)**	None	303	14–4	
Mar 23	Bryant*	No. 25	Elliot Ballpark • Storrs, CT	**W** 9–1	**Cole (1–0)**	MacDonald (0–2)	None	658	15–4	
Mar 25	Rhode Island*	No. 25	Elliot Ballpark • Storrs, CT	**W** 19–2	**Peterson (4–0)**	Andrade (0–1)	**Quinn (1)**	767	16–4	
Mar 26	at Rhode Island*	No. 25	Bill Beck Field • Kingston, RI	**L** 2–6	Picone (1–3)	**Gallagher (4–2)**	Sposato (2)	206	16–5	
Mar 27	Rhode Island*	No. 25	Elliot Ballpark • Storrs, CT	**W** 4–1	**Stefanoni (3–1)**	Leveque (0–5)	**Willis (5)**	907	17–5	
Mar 29	Boston College*	No. 25	Elliot Ballpark • Storrs, CT	**L** 3–5	Leake (1–0)	**Chudoba (0–1)**	Ryan (1)	527	17–6	

April (19–2)
Date	Opponent	Rank	Site/stadium	Score	Win	Loss	Save	Attendance	Overall record	BE Record
Apr 1	at Kent State*	No. 25	Schoonover Stadium • Kent, OH	**W** 4–3	**Peterson (5–0)**	Dell (3–1)	**Willis (5)**	247	18–6	
Apr 2	at Kent State*	No. 25	Schoonover Stadium • Kent, OH	**W** 8–6^{10}	**Cooke (4–0)**	Vera (0–2)	**Willis (6)**	267	19–6	
Apr 3	at Kent State*	No. 25	Schoonover Stadium • Kent, OH	**L** 4–5	Rippl (1–1)	**Sullivan (0–1)**	None	231	19–7	
Apr 5	Central Connecticut*	No. 25	Elliot Ballpark • Storrs, CT	**W** 25–6	**O'Donnell (1–1)**	Buchek (0–2)	None	402	20–7	
Apr 6	Merrimack*	No. 25	Elliot Ballpark • Storrs, CT	**W** 10–1	**Quinn (1–0)**	Healy (1–1)	None	220	21–7	
Apr 8	St. John's	No. 25	Elliot Ballpark • Storrs, CT	**W** 12–7	**Peterson (6–0)**	Rodriguez (1–3)	None	432	22–7	1–0
Apr 9	St. John's	No. 25	Elliot Ballpark • Storrs, CT	**W** 13–0	**Gallagher (5–2)**	Backman (1–1)	None	551	23–7	2–0
Apr 10	St. John's	No. 25	Elliot Ballpark • Storrs, CT	**W** 10–0	**Stefanoni (4–1)**	Fauci (2–2)	None	583	24–7	3–0
Apr 12	Marist*	No. 18	Dunkin' Donuts Park • Hartford, CT	**W** 15–4	**Cooke (5–0)**	Hacker (0–2)	None	1,068	25–7	
Apr 14	at Seton Hall	No. 18	Owen T. Carroll Field • South Orange, NJ	**W** 7–6	**Peterson (7–0)**	Waldis (1–6)	**Willis (7)**	123	26–7	4–0
Apr 16	at Seton Hall	No. 18	Owen T. Carroll Field • South Orange, NJ	**W** 3–2	**Gallagher (6–2)**	Payero (0–4)	**Willis (8)**	194	27–7	5–0
Apr 16	at Seton Hall	No. 18	Owen T. Carroll Field • South Orange, NJ	**W** 14–2	**Stefanoni (5–1)**	O'Neill (2–5)	None	DH	28–7	6–0
Apr 19	UMass*	No. 15	Elliot Ballpark • Storrs, CT	**W** 28–11	**Chudoba (2–1)**	Wittman (0–1)	None	659	29–7	
Apr 20	at Boston College*	No. 15	Eddie Pellagrini Diamond • Brighton, MA	**W** 8–0	**Cooke (6–0)**	Delongchamp (2–1)	None	248	30–7	
Apr 22	Villanova	No. 15	Elliot Ballpark • Storrs, CT	**W** 4–1	**Peterson (8–0)**	Patten (2–6)	**Willis (9)**	833	31–7	7–0
Apr 23	Villanova	No. 15	Elliot Ballpark • Storrs, CT	**L** 1–4	Arella (3–2)	**Gallagher (6–3)**	Wilkinson (2)	934	31–8	7–1
Apr 24	Villanova	No. 15	Elliot Ballpark • Storrs, CT	**W** 2–1	**O'Donnell (2–1)**	Cole (0–2)	None	734	32–8	8–1
Apr 26	at Northeastern*	No. 15	Parsons Field • Brookline, MA	**W** 5–2^{10}	**O'Donnell (3–1)**	Balboni (0–1)	**Willis (10)**	71	33–8	
Apr 27	Yale*	No. 15	Elliot Ballpark • Storrs, CT	**W** 8–4	**Cooke (7–0)**	Chatfield (2–1)	None	343	34–8	
Apr 29	at Butler	No. 15	Bulldog Park • Indianapolis, IN	**W** 8–7^{10}	**Sullivan (1–1)**	Barokas (2–4)	**Willis (11)**	129	35–8	9–1
Apr 30	at Butler	No. 15	Bulldog Park • Indianapolis, IN	**W** 14–7	**Gallagher (7–3)**	Bosecker (0–6)	None	401	36–8	10–1

May (7–5)
Date	Opponent	Rank	Site/stadium	Score	Win	Loss	Save	Attendance	Overall record	BE Record
May 1	at Butler	No. 15	Bulldog Park • Indianapolis, IN	**W** 17–4	**Stefanoni (6–1)**	MacCauley (3–2)	None	375	37–8	11–1
May 6	Creighton	No. 15	Elliot Ballpark • Storrs, CT	**W** 3–1	**Peterson (3–1)**	Tebrake (6–2)	**Willis (12)**	520	38–8	12–1
May 7	Creighton	No. 15	Elliot Ballpark • Storrs, CT	**W** 6–5	**Coe (1–0)**	Cancellieri (5–2)	**Willis (13)**	650	39–8	13–1
May 8	Creighton	No. 15	Elliot Ballpark • Storrs, CT	**W** 6–5	**Kirby (1–0)**	Steir (3–1)	None	521	40–8	14–1
May 10	Northeastern*	No. 13	Elliot Ballpark • Storrs, CT	**L** 4–9	Gigliotti (2–1)	**Cooke (7–1)**	None	509	40–9	
May 13	Xavier	No. 13	Elliot Ballpark • Storrs, CT	**L** 2–7	Lynch (8–0)	**Peterson (9–1)**	None	712	40–10	14–2
May 14	Xavier	No. 13	Elliot Ballpark • Storrs, CT	**W** 11–3	**Gallagher (8–2)**	Kelly (3–1)	**Coe (2)**	917	41–10	15–2
May 15	Xavier	No. 13	Elliot Ballpark • Storrs, CT	**W** 17–6	**Kirby (2–0)**	Gadd (5–4)	None	1,308	42–10	16–2
May 17	at Bryant*	No. 16	Conaty Park • Smithfield, RI	**W** 9–2	**Chudoba (3–1)**	Turner (1–2)	None	100	43–10	
May 19	at Georgetown	No. 16	Shirley Povich Field • Bethesda, MD	**L** 2–13	Bosch (6–3)	**Peterson (9–2)**	Tonas (7)	479	43–11	16–3
May 20	at Georgetown	No. 16	Shirley Povich Field • Bethesda, MD	**L** 13–14	DeRoche (1–1)	**Willis (1–1)**	None	597	43–12	16–4
May 21	at Georgetown	No. 16	Shirley Povich Field • Bethesda, MD	**L** 5–6	Redfern (2–1)	**Coe (1–1)**	None	487	43–13	16–5

Postseason (6–1)

Big East Tournament (3–0)
Date	Opponent	Rank	Site/stadium	Score	Win	Loss	Save	Attendance	Overall record	BET Record
May 26	(4) Georgetown	(1)	Prasco Park • Mason, OH	**W** 4–0	**Peterson (10–2)**	Bosch (6–4)	None		44–13	1–0
May 27	(2) Creighton	(1)	Prasco Park • Mason, OH	**W** 7–1	**Gallagher (9–3)**	Lommel (1–5)	None		45–13	2–0
May 28	(3) Xavier	(1)	Prasco Park • Mason, OH	**W** 7–2	**Coe (2–1)**	Bailey (0–2)	None	2,309	46–13	3–0

NCAA College Park Regional (3–1)
Date	Opponent	Rank	Site/stadium	Score	Win	Loss	Save	Attendance	Overall record	NCAAT record
June 3	(2) Wake Forest	(3)	Bob "Turtle" Smith Stadium • College Park, MD	**W** 8–7	**Willis (2–1)**	Minacci (2–4)	None	1,679	47–13	1–0
June 4	No. 12 (1) Maryland	(3)	Bob "Turtle" Smith Stadium • College Park, MD	**W** 10–5	**Gallagher (10–3)**	Savacool (8–3)	**Willis (15)**	3,000	48–13	2–0
June 5	No. 12 (1) Maryland	(3)	Bob "Turtle" Smith Stadium • College Park, MD	**L** 6–7	Johnson (2–0)	**Kirby (2–1)**	None	2,568	48–14	2–1
June 6	No. 12 (1) Maryland	(3)	Bob "Turtle" Smith Stadium • College Park, MD	**W** 11–8	**Cooke (8–1)**	Johnson (2–1)	**Willis (16)**	3,000	49–14	3–1

NCAA Stanford Super Regional (1–2)
Date	Opponent	Rank	Site/stadium	Score	Win	Loss	Save	Attendance	Overall record	SR Record
June 11	No. 2 (2) Stanford		Klein Field at Sunken Diamond • Stanford, CA	**W** 13–12	**Gallagher (11–3)**	Williams (8–3)	None	2,673	50–14	1–0
June 12	No. 2 (2) Stanford		Klein Field at Sunken Diamond • Stanford, CA	**L** 2–8	Pancer (3–0)	**Peterson (11–3)**	Mathews (8)	2,756	50–15	1–1
June 13	No. 2 (2) Stanford		Klein Field at Sunken Diamond • Stanford, CA	**L** 5–10	Bruno (6–1)	**Coe (2–2)**	Mathews (9)	2,689	50–16	1–2

Rankings from D1Baseball. Parentheses indicate tournament seedings.

=== Big East tournament ===
Big East tournament teams
(1) UConn Huskies	(2) Creighton Bluejays	(3) Xavier Musketeers	(4) Georgetown Hoyas

First round
1	**UConn**	**4**
4	Georgetown	0
3	Xavier	5
2	**Creighton**	**6**
Lower round 1
4	Georgetown	8
3	**Xavier**	**16**

Semi-finals
1	**UConn**	**7**
2	Creighton	1
Lower final
2	Creighton	8
3	**Xavier**	**27**

Finals
1	**UConn**	**7**	–
3	Xavier	2	–

== Ranking movements ==
Ranking movements Legend: ██ Increase in ranking ██ Decrease in ranking — = Not ranked RV = Received votes
	Week																		
Poll	Pre	1	2	3	4	5	6	7	8	9	10	11	12	13	14	15	16	17	Final
ESPN/USA Today Coaches Poll	—	—*	RV	RV	RV	RV	RV	RV	21	16	16	13	10	15	23	RV	RV*	RV*	16
Baseball America	—	—	—	—	—	—	—	—	—	—	—	—	18	19	—	—	—*	—*	15
Collegiate Baseball	39	—	—	—	—	—	—	—	25	14	14	11	8	17	26	26	14	16	16
NCBWA	—	RV	RV	RV	30	27	27	25	21	13	13	10	10	12	22	26	14	14*	16
D1Baseball	—	—	—	—	—	25	25	25	18	15	15	15	13	16	—	—	—*	—*	16
