= Dylan DeLucia =

Italian and American baseball player (born 2000)

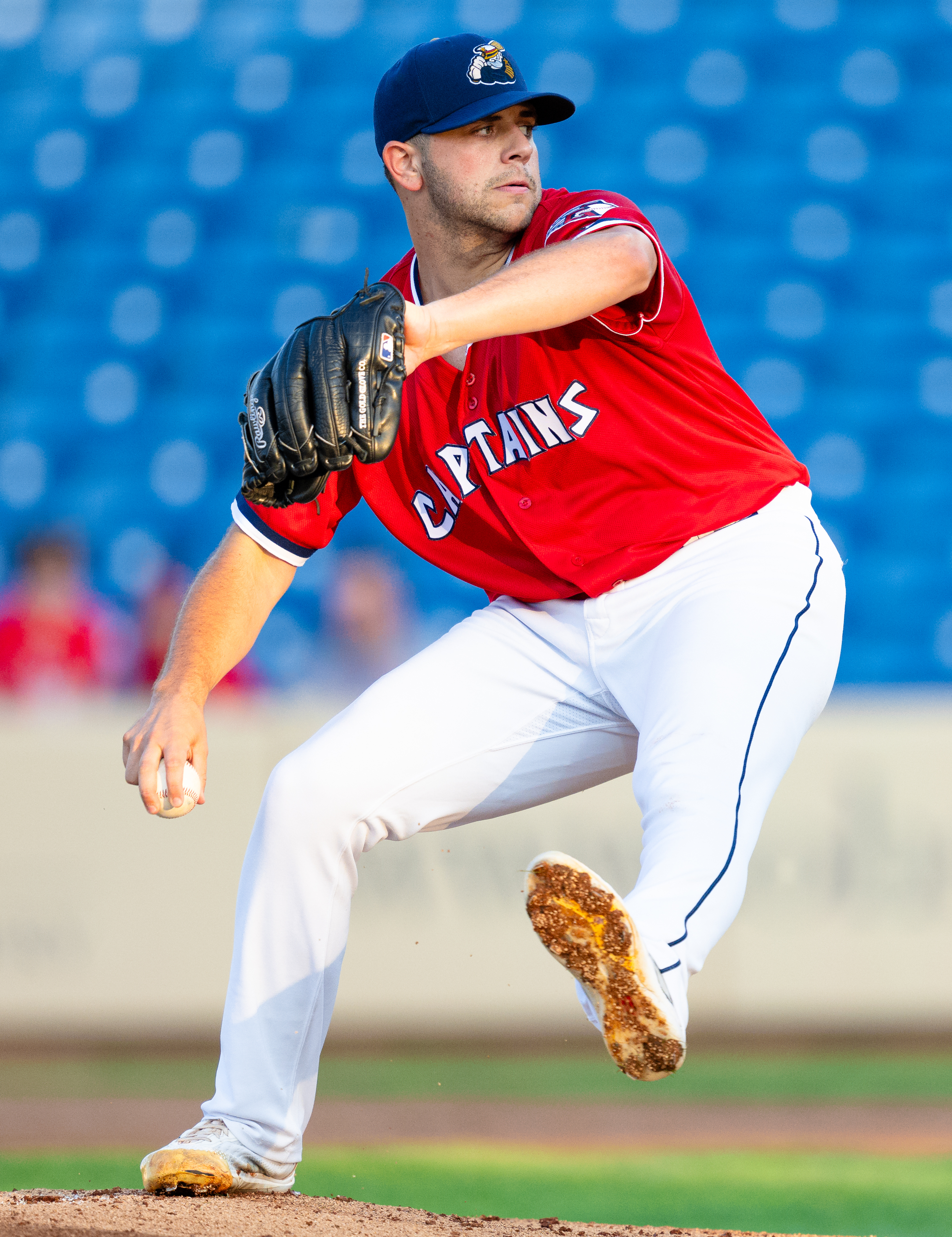
- DeLucia with the Lake County Captains in 2024

Cleveland Guardians
- Pitcher
- Born: August 1, 2000 (age 25); Port Orange, Florida, U.S.
- Bats: Right Throws: Right

Career highlights and awards
- College World Series Most Outstanding Player (2022)

Dylan Joseph DeLucia (born August 1, 2000) is an Italian and American professional baseball pitcher in the Cleveland Guardians organization.

== Career ==
DeLucia graduated from New Smyrna Beach High School in New Smyrna Beach, Florida. He began his college baseball career at Northwest Florida State College, before he transferred to the University of Mississippi to play for the Ole Miss Rebels after two seasons. He was named the College World Series Most Outstanding Player for the 2022 College World Series. After the season, Baseball America named DeLucia a third team All-American.

Eligible to be selected in the 2022 Major League Baseball draft, the Cleveland Guardians selected DeLucia in the sixth round, with the 181st overall pick. He signed with the Guardians for $275,000 on July 26, 2022. DeLucia had Tommy John surgery after he signed and made his professional debut in a rehabilitation assignment in June 2024. After completing his rehab assignment, DeLucia was assigned to the Single-A Lynchburg Hillcats. On July 22, 2024, DeLucia was promoted to the High-A Lake County Captains. On June 10, 2025, DeLucia was assigned to the Double A Akron RubberDucks.

== International career ==
DeLucia played for the Italy national baseball team at the 2026 World Baseball Classic.
