= 2022 Men's College World Series =

Final stage of the 2022 NCAA Division I baseball tournament

2022 College World Series
Team (Wins)	Manager(s)	Season
Ole Miss (2)	Mike Bianco	42–23 (.646)
Oklahoma (0)	Skip Johnson	43–22 (.662)
- Dates: June 17–26
- MOP: Dylan DeLucia, P, Ole Miss
- Umpires: Scott Cline, Chris Coskey, Adam Dowdy, Darren Hyman, Grady Smith, Kevin Sweeney, Jake Uhlenhopp, Mark Wagers

Broadcast
- Television: ESPN (United States – English)
- TV announcers: Karl Ravech (game 1), Mike Monaco (game 2) (play–by–play), Chris Burke, Kyle Peterson (color), Kris Budden (field reporter)

The 2022 NCAA Men's College World Series (Note: While the event's official name has been "NCAA Men's College World Series" since no later than 2008, the 2022 edition was the first in which the NCAA consistently included the word "Men's" in the event branding.) was the final stage of the 2022 NCAA Division I baseball tournament. It was scheduled from June 17 through 27 at Charles Schwab Field Omaha in Omaha, Nebraska, but ended on June 26. This marked the 75th edition of the College World Series and 72nd time the event was held in Omaha.

The tournament featured eight teams in two double elimination brackets with the two winners meeting in a best-of-three championship series.

== Background ==
The 2022 edition of the NCAA Men's College World Series featured four teams from the SEC, all from the conference's West Division; two from the Big 12, both of which announced they would join the SEC no later than the 2025–26 school year and were later confirmed as 2024–25 entrants; and one each from the ACC and Pac-12. Most of these teams advanced to Omaha by winning on the road, as only two were national seeds. The top national seed, Tennessee, was eliminated in its Super Regional by Notre Dame in a series that went the full three games. In the MCWS itself, the #2 national seed Stanford and Texas quickly went two-and-out, with the Cardinal first getting destroyed by Arkansas 17–2 then losing handily to Auburn. The Longhorns lost their opener to Notre Dame, then exited after being hammered by the #5 national seed, archrival Texas A&M. A&M reached the Bracket 1 final, losing there to Oklahoma.

Ole Miss went 5–1 at the MCWS, beating the Auburn Tigers once and the Arkansas Razorbacks twice in three matchups to advance to the championship series, where they swept Oklahoma to win the World Series. Ole Miss defeated the Sooners 10–3 in game 1 and 4–2 in game 2 to win the MCWS title.

== Participants ==
School	Conference	Record (Conf)	Head Coach	Super Regional	Previous CWS Appearances	CWS Best Finish	CWS W–L Record
Notre Dame	ACC	40–15 (16–11)	Link Jarrett	Knoxville	2 (last: 2002)	4th (1957)	3–4
Oklahoma	Big 12	42–22 (15–9)	Skip Johnson	Blacksburg	10 (last: 2010)	1st (1951, 1994)	13–14
Texas A&M	SEC	42–18 (19–11)	Jim Schlossnagle	College Station	6 (last: 2017)	5th (1951, 1993)	2–12
Texas	Big 12	47–20 (14–10)	David Pierce	Greenville	37 (last: 2021)	1st (1949, 1950, 1975, 1983, 2002, 2005)	88–63
Stanford	Pac–12	47–16 (21–9)	David Esquer	Stanford	17 (last: 2021)	1st (1987, 1988)	41–31
Arkansas	SEC	43–19 (18–12)	Dave Van Horn	Chapel Hill	10 (last: 2019)	2nd (1979, 2018)	15–20
Ole Miss	SEC	37–22 (14–16)	Mike Bianco	Hattiesburg	5 (last: 2014)	3rd (1956, 2014)	5-10
Auburn	SEC	42–20 (16–13)	Butch Thompson	Corvallis	5 (last: 2019)	4th (1967)	3–10

== Bracket ==
Seeds listed below indicate national seeds only

First round	Second round
Notre Dame	7
9	Texas	3
Notre Dame	2
Oklahoma	6
5	Texas A&M	8
Oklahoma	13
Bracket 1
9	Texas	2
5	Texas A&M	10
5	Texas A&M	5
Notre Dame	1
2	Stanford	2
Arkansas	17
Arkansas	5
Ole Miss	13
Ole Miss	5
14	Auburn	1
Bracket 2
2	Stanford	2
14	Auburn	6
14	Auburn	1
Arkansas	11

Semifinals
Oklahoma	5	–
5	Texas A&M	1	–
Ole Miss	2	2
Arkansas	3	0

Finals
Oklahoma	3	2	–
Ole Miss	10	4	–

== Game results ==
=== Bracket 1 ===
June 17, 2022; 1:00 pm CDT (UTC-5); Game 1	Oklahoma	13–8	No. 5 Texas A&M	Charles Schwab Field Omaha; Attendance: 23,886; Umpires: HP: Adam Dowdy, 1B: Chris Coskey, 2B: Jake Uhlenhopp, 3B: Mark Wagers
June 17, 2022; 1:00 pm CDT (UTC-5); Game 1	WP: Jake Bennett (10–3)	Boxscore	LP: Nathan Dettmer (5–3)	Charles Schwab Field Omaha; Attendance: 23,886; Umpires: HP: Adam Dowdy, 1B: Chris Coskey, 2B: Jake Uhlenhopp, 3B: Mark Wagers
June 17, 2022; 1:00 pm CDT (UTC-5); Game 1	HR: Jimmy Crooks (8), Jackson Nicklaus (11)	Boxscore	HR: Austin Bost (10), Jordan Thompson (6)	Charles Schwab Field Omaha; Attendance: 23,886; Umpires: HP: Adam Dowdy, 1B: Chris Coskey, 2B: Jake Uhlenhopp, 3B: Mark Wagers

June 17, 2022; 6:00 pm CDT (UTC-5); Game 2	Notre Dame	7–3	No. 9 Texas	Charles Schwab Field Omaha; Attendance: 25,134; Umpires: HP: Scott Cline, 1B: Grady Smith, 2B: Darren Hyman, 3B: Kevin Sweeney
June 17, 2022; 6:00 pm CDT (UTC-5); Game 2	WP: John Bertrand (10–3); Sv: Jack Findlay (4)	Boxscore	LP: Pete Hansen (11–3)	Charles Schwab Field Omaha; Attendance: 25,134; Umpires: HP: Scott Cline, 1B: Grady Smith, 2B: Darren Hyman, 3B: Kevin Sweeney
June 17, 2022; 6:00 pm CDT (UTC-5); Game 2	HR: Jared Miller (5), Carter Putz (8)	Boxscore		Charles Schwab Field Omaha; Attendance: 25,134; Umpires: HP: Scott Cline, 1B: Grady Smith, 2B: Darren Hyman, 3B: Kevin Sweeney

June 19, 2022; 1:00 pm CDT (UTC-5); Game 5	No. 9 Texas	2–10	No. 5 Texas A&M	Charles Schwab Field Omaha; Attendance: 24,056; Umpires: HP: Darren Hyman, 1B: Kevin Sweeney, 2B: Scott Cline, 3B: Grady Smith
June 19, 2022; 1:00 pm CDT (UTC-5); Game 5	LP: Lucas Gordon (7–2)	Boxscore	WP: Micah Dallas (7–3)	Charles Schwab Field Omaha; Attendance: 24,056; Umpires: HP: Darren Hyman, 1B: Kevin Sweeney, 2B: Scott Cline, 3B: Grady Smith

June 19, 2022; 6:00 pm CDT (UTC-5); Game 6	Oklahoma	6–2	Notre Dame	Charles Schwab Field Omaha; Attendance: 24,934; Umpires: HP: Jake Uhlenhopp, 1B: Mark Wagers, 2B: Adam Dowdy, 3B: Chris Coskey
June 19, 2022; 6:00 pm CDT (UTC-5); Game 6	WP: Cade Horton (5–2)	Boxscore	LP: Aidan Tyrell (5–2)	Charles Schwab Field Omaha; Attendance: 24,934; Umpires: HP: Jake Uhlenhopp, 1B: Mark Wagers, 2B: Adam Dowdy, 3B: Chris Coskey
June 19, 2022; 6:00 pm CDT (UTC-5); Game 6		Boxscore	HR: David Lamanna (3)	Charles Schwab Field Omaha; Attendance: 24,934; Umpires: HP: Jake Uhlenhopp, 1B: Mark Wagers, 2B: Adam Dowdy, 3B: Chris Coskey

June 21, 2022; 1:00 pm CDT (UTC-5); Game 9	No. 5 Texas A&M	5–1	Notre Dame	Charles Schwab Field Omaha; Attendance: 23,618; Umpires: HP: Scott Cline, 1B: Grady Smith, 2B: Jake Uhlenhopp, 3B: Mark Wagers
June 21, 2022; 1:00 pm CDT (UTC-5); Game 9	WP: Nathan Dettmer (6–3)	Boxscore	LP: Liam Simon (2–1)	Charles Schwab Field Omaha; Attendance: 23,618; Umpires: HP: Scott Cline, 1B: Grady Smith, 2B: Jake Uhlenhopp, 3B: Mark Wagers
June 21, 2022; 1:00 pm CDT (UTC-5); Game 9	HR: Trevor Werner (7)	Boxscore	HR: Brooks Coetzee (12)	Charles Schwab Field Omaha; Attendance: 23,618; Umpires: HP: Scott Cline, 1B: Grady Smith, 2B: Jake Uhlenhopp, 3B: Mark Wagers

June 22, 2022; 1:00 pm CDT (UTC-5); Game 11	Oklahoma	5–1	No. 5 Texas A&M	Charles Schwab Field Omaha; Attendance: 23,827; Umpires: HP: Grady Smith, 1B: Kevin Sweeney, 2B: Adam Dowdy, 3B: Chris Coskey
June 22, 2022; 1:00 pm CDT (UTC-5); Game 11	WP: David Sandlin (10–4)	Boxscore	LP: Ryan Prager (1–4)	Charles Schwab Field Omaha; Attendance: 23,827; Umpires: HP: Grady Smith, 1B: Kevin Sweeney, 2B: Adam Dowdy, 3B: Chris Coskey
June 22, 2022; 1:00 pm CDT (UTC-5); Game 11	HR: Crooks (9)	Boxscore	HR: Rock (19)	Charles Schwab Field Omaha; Attendance: 23,827; Umpires: HP: Grady Smith, 1B: Kevin Sweeney, 2B: Adam Dowdy, 3B: Chris Coskey

=== Bracket 2 ===
June 18, 2022; 1:00 pm CDT (UTC-5); Game 3	Arkansas	17–2	No. 2 Stanford	Charles Schwab Field Omaha; Attendance: 24,337; Umpires: HP: Chris Coskey, 1B: Jake Uhlenhopp, 2B: Mark Wagers, 3B: Adam Dowdy
June 18, 2022; 1:00 pm CDT (UTC-5); Game 3	WP: Connor Noland (8–5)	Boxscore	LP: Alex Williams (8–4)	Charles Schwab Field Omaha; Attendance: 24,337; Umpires: HP: Chris Coskey, 1B: Jake Uhlenhopp, 2B: Mark Wagers, 3B: Adam Dowdy
June 18, 2022; 1:00 pm CDT (UTC-5); Game 3	HR: Chris Lanzilli (9), Cayden Wallace (16)	Boxscore	HR: Brock Jones (21)	Charles Schwab Field Omaha; Attendance: 24,337; Umpires: HP: Chris Coskey, 1B: Jake Uhlenhopp, 2B: Mark Wagers, 3B: Adam Dowdy

June 18, 2022; 6:00 pm CDT (UTC-5); Game 4	Ole Miss	5–1	No. 14 Auburn	Charles Schwab Field Omaha; Attendance: 25,217; Umpires: HP: Grady Smith, 1B: Darren Hyman, 2B: Kevin Sweeney, 3B: Scott Cline
June 18, 2022; 6:00 pm CDT (UTC-5); Game 4	WP: Dylan DeLucia (7–2)	Boxscore	LP: Joseph Gonzalez (7–4)	Charles Schwab Field Omaha; Attendance: 25,217; Umpires: HP: Grady Smith, 1B: Darren Hyman, 2B: Kevin Sweeney, 3B: Scott Cline
June 18, 2022; 6:00 pm CDT (UTC-5); Game 4	HR: Kevin Graham (11)	Boxscore		Charles Schwab Field Omaha; Attendance: 25,217; Umpires: HP: Grady Smith, 1B: Darren Hyman, 2B: Kevin Sweeney, 3B: Scott Cline

June 20, 2022; 1:00 pm CDT (UTC-5); Game 7	No. 2 Stanford	2–6	No. 14 Auburn	Charles Schwab Field Omaha; Attendance: 23,594; Umpires: HP: Kevin Sweeney, 1B: Scott Cline, 2B: Grady Smith, 3B: Darren Hyman
June 20, 2022; 1:00 pm CDT (UTC-5); Game 7	LP: Quinn Mathews (9–2)	Boxscore	WP: Trace Bright (5–4)	Charles Schwab Field Omaha; Attendance: 23,594; Umpires: HP: Kevin Sweeney, 1B: Scott Cline, 2B: Grady Smith, 3B: Darren Hyman

June 20, 2022; 6:00 pm CDT (UTC-5); Game 8	Ole Miss	13–5	Arkansas	Charles Schwab Field Omaha; Attendance: 25,246; Umpires: HP: Mark Wagers, 1B: Adam Dowdy, 2B: Chris Coskey, 3B: Jake Uhlenhopp
June 20, 2022; 6:00 pm CDT (UTC-5); Game 8	WP: Hunter Elliott (5–3)	Boxscore	LP: Zack Morris (6–1)	Charles Schwab Field Omaha; Attendance: 25,246; Umpires: HP: Mark Wagers, 1B: Adam Dowdy, 2B: Chris Coskey, 3B: Jake Uhlenhopp
June 20, 2022; 6:00 pm CDT (UTC-5); Game 8	HR: Tim Elko (23), Calvin Harris (2)	Boxscore	HR: Peyton Stovall (6)	Charles Schwab Field Omaha; Attendance: 25,246; Umpires: HP: Mark Wagers, 1B: Adam Dowdy, 2B: Chris Coskey, 3B: Jake Uhlenhopp

June 21, 2022; 6:00 pm CDT (UTC-5); Game 10	No. 14 Auburn	1–11	Arkansas	Charles Schwab Field Omaha; Attendance: 24,636; Umpires: HP: Adam Dowdy, 1B: Chris Coskey, 2B: Darren Hyman, 3B: Kevin Sweeney
June 21, 2022; 6:00 pm CDT (UTC-5); Game 10	LP: Mason Barnett (3–3)	Boxscore	WP: Will McEntire (2–2)	Charles Schwab Field Omaha; Attendance: 24,636; Umpires: HP: Adam Dowdy, 1B: Chris Coskey, 2B: Darren Hyman, 3B: Kevin Sweeney
June 21, 2022; 6:00 pm CDT (UTC-5); Game 10	HR: Bobby Peirce (10)	Boxscore	HR: Chris Lanzilli (10)	Charles Schwab Field Omaha; Attendance: 24,636; Umpires: HP: Adam Dowdy, 1B: Chris Coskey, 2B: Darren Hyman, 3B: Kevin Sweeney

June 22, 2022; 6:00 pm CDT (UTC-5); Game 12	Arkansas	3–2	Ole Miss	Charles Schwab Field Omaha; Attendance: 25,401; Umpires: HP: Jake Uhlenhopp, 1B: Darren Hyman, 2B: Mark Wagers, 3B: Scott Cline
June 22, 2022; 6:00 pm CDT (UTC-5); Game 12	WP: Hagen Smith (7–2); Sv: Zack Morris (1)	Boxscore	LP: John Gaddis (3–2)	Charles Schwab Field Omaha; Attendance: 25,401; Umpires: HP: Jake Uhlenhopp, 1B: Darren Hyman, 2B: Mark Wagers, 3B: Scott Cline
June 22, 2022; 6:00 pm CDT (UTC-5); Game 12	HR: Chris Lanzilli (11), Brady Slavens (16)	Boxscore	HR: Kemp Alderman (11)	Charles Schwab Field Omaha; Attendance: 25,401; Umpires: HP: Jake Uhlenhopp, 1B: Darren Hyman, 2B: Mark Wagers, 3B: Scott Cline

June 23, 2022; 3:00 pm CDT (UTC-5); Game 13	Ole Miss	2–0	Arkansas	Charles Schwab Field Omaha; Attendance: 20,434; Umpires: HP: Kevin Sweeney, 1B: Chris Coskey, 2B: Adam Dowdy, 3B: Grady Smith
June 23, 2022; 3:00 pm CDT (UTC-5); Game 13	WP: Dylan DeLucia (8–2)	Boxscore	LP: Connor Noland (8–6)	Charles Schwab Field Omaha; Attendance: 20,434; Umpires: HP: Kevin Sweeney, 1B: Chris Coskey, 2B: Adam Dowdy, 3B: Grady Smith

=== Finals ===
==== Game 1 ====
June 25, 2022 6:00 p.m. (CDT) at Charles Schwab Field Omaha in Omaha, Nebraska
Team	1	2	3	4	5	6	7	8	9	R	H	E
Ole Miss	2	1	1	0	0	0	0	4	2	10	16	1
Oklahoma	0	0	0	0	0	2	0	1	0	3	5	1
WP: Jack Dougherty LP: Jake Bennett; Home runs: Ole Miss: Tim Elko, Justin Bench, Calvin Harris, TJ McCants; OU: None

==== Game 2 ====
June 26, 2022 2:00 p.m. (CDT) at Charles Schwab Field Omaha in Omaha, Nebraska
Team	1	2	3	4	5	6	7	8	9	R	H	E
Oklahoma	0	0	0	0	0	0	2	0	0	2	3	0
Ole Miss	0	0	0	0	0	1	0	3	–	4	6	0
WP: John Gaddis LP: Trevin Michael Sv: Brandon Johnson; Home runs: OU: None; Ole Miss: Jacob Gonzalez

== All-Tournament Team ==
The following players were members of the Men's College World Series All-Tournament Team.

Position	Player	School
P	Dylan DeLucia (MOP)	Ole Miss
P	Cade Horton	Oklahoma
C	Michael Turner	Arkansas
1B	Tim Elko	Ole Miss
2B	Jared Miller	Notre Dame
3B	Justin Bench	Ole Miss
SS	Peyton Graham	Oklahoma
OF	Kevin Graham	Ole Miss
OF	Tanner Tredaway	Oklahoma
OF	Calvin Harris	Ole Miss
DH	Kemp Alderman	Ole Miss
