= Matt Mazurek =

American baseball coach (born 1984)

Current position
- Title: Head coach
- Team: Canisius
- Conference: MAAC
- Record: 193–216–2 (.472)

Biographical details
- Born: March 7, 1984 (age 42)
- Education: Canisius College

Playing career
- 2003–2004: Jamestown CC
- 2005–2006: Canisius
- 2007: Joliet JackHammers
- 2008–2009: Rockford RiverHawks
- Position: Infielder

Coaching career (HC unless noted)
- 2007–2017: Canisius (assistant)
- 2018–present: Canisius

Head coaching record
- Overall: 193–216–2 (.472)
- Tournaments: NCAA: 0–4

Accomplishments and honors

Championships
- MAAC (2019); MAAC Tournament (2018, 2022)

Awards
- MAAC Coach of the Year (2019)

Matt Mazurek (born March 7, 1984) is an American baseball coach, currently serving as the head baseball coach at Canisius College. After attending Jamestown Community College, Mazurek attended college at Canisius College and played on the Canisius Golden Griffins baseball team where he was named Canisius College Male Athlete of the Year in 2006. After graduating from Canisius in 2006, Mazurek went on to a three-year career in independent baseball, playing for the Joliet JackHammers in 2007, and the Rockford RiverHawks in 2008 and 2009. Mazurek served as an assistant baseball coach at Canisius College from 2007 to 2017. Mazurek was named head baseball coach at Canisius College on September 6, 2017. Mazurek was named the MAAC Coach of the Year in 2019.

== Head coaching record ==
Record table
Season	Team	Overall	Conference	Standing	Postseason
Canisius Golden Griffins (MAAC) (2018–present)
2018	Canisius	35–22	16–8	3rd	NCAA Regional
2019	Canisius	24–29	17–7	T-1st	MAAC tournament
2020	Canisius	3–11–1	0–0		Season canceled due to COVID-19
2021	Canisius	20–16	17–13	4th	MAAC tournament
2022	Canisius	29–25	15–9	3rd	NCAA Regional
2023	Canisius	26–25–1	16–8	T-3rd	MAAC tournament
2024	Canisius	18–30	11–13	5th	MAAC tournament
2025	Canisius	14–31	10–19	12th	
2026	Canisius	21–27	17–13	T-5th	MAAC tournament
Canisius:		193–216–2 (.472)	122–88 (.581)		
Total:		193–216–2 (.472)			
National champion Postseason invitational champion Conference regular season champion Conference regular season and conference tournament champion Division regular season champion Division regular season and conference tournament champion Conference tournament champion
