= 2022 West Virginia Mountaineers baseball team =

College Baseball Season

2022 West Virginia Mountaineers baseball
- Conference: Big 12 Conference
- Record: 33–22 (14–10 Big 12)
- Head coach: Randy Mazey (10th season)
- Assistant coaches: Steve Sabins (7th season); Mark Ginther (4th season); Jacob Garcia (3rd season)
- Home stadium: Monongalia County Ballpark

2022 Big 12 Conference baseball standings
| | Conf. | | | | Overall |
| Team | W | | L | PCT | W | | L | PCT |
|---|---|---|---|---|---|---|---|---|
| No. 23 TCU ‍†‍‍^{y} | 16 | – | 8 | .667 | 38 | – | 22 | .633 |
| Oklahoma State ‍‍‍^{y} | 15 | – | 9 | .625 | 42 | – | 22 | .656 |
| No. 2 Oklahoma ‍‍‡‍^{y} | 15 | – | 9 | .625 | 45 | – | 24 | .652 |
| No. 24 Texas Tech ‍‍‍^{y} | 15 | – | 9 | .625 | 39 | – | 22 | .639 |
| No. 8 Texas ‍‍‍^{y} | 14 | – | 10 | .583 | 47 | – | 22 | .681 |
| West Virginia ‍‍‍ | 14 | – | 10 | .583 | 33 | – | 22 | .600 |
| Kansas State ‍‍‍ | 8 | – | 16 | .333 | 29 | – | 29 | .500 |
| Baylor ‍‍‍ | 7 | – | 17 | .292 | 26 | – | 28 | .481 |
| Kansas ‍‍‍ | 4 | – | 20 | .167 | 20 | – | 35 | .364 |
† – Conference champion ‡ – Tournament champion y – Invited to the NCAA tournament Rankings from D1baseball

The 2022 West Virginia Mountaineers baseball team represented West Virginia University during the 2022 NCAA Division I baseball season. The Mountaineers played their home games at Monongalia County Ballpark as a member of the Big 12 Conference. They were led by head coach Randy Mazey, in his 10th season at West Virginia.

== Previous season ==
The 2021 team finished the season with a 25–27 record and an 8–16 record in the Big 12. In the 2021 Big 12 Conference baseball tournament, the eighth-seeded Mountaineers upset top-seeded Texas in the first round 5–1, but fell 2–12 to fourth-seeded Oklahoma State and 2–3 to Texas to end their conference tournament in the Second Round. The Mountaineers did not earn an at-large bid to the 2021 NCAA Division I baseball tournament.

== Personnel ==
=== Coaching staff ===
| Name | Position | Seasons at WVU | Alma mater |
|---|---|---|---|
| Randy Mazey | Head coach | 10 | Clemson (1988) |
| Steve Sabins | Associate Head Coach | 7 | Embry–Riddle (2011) |
| Mark Ginther | Assistant Coach | 4 | Oklahoma State (2013) |
| Jacob Garcia | Assistant Coach | 3 | Northern Colorado (2018) |

=== Roster ===
2022 West Virginia Mountaineers Roster
| Pitchers: 1 Kevin Dowdell – junior (6'1, 210); 3 Josh Heath – freshman (6'1, 205); 7 Trevor Sharp – sophomore (6'3, 190); 8 Tim Wynia – junior (6'3, 210); 11 Ben Hampton – sophomore (6'1, 205); 12 Chase Smith – Fifth Year (6'2, 180); 15 Trent Hodgdon – freshman (6'3, 205); 17 Carlson Reed – sophomore (6'4, 200); 23 Zach Bravo – Fifth Year (6'0, 170); 24 Jacob Watters – junior (6'4, 230); 30 Beau Lowery – senior (6'0, 210); 31 Tyler Strechay – RS sophomore (6'3, 220); 32 Chris Sleeper – freshman (6'3, 230); 35 Deaton Oak – freshman (6'1, 165); 36 Noah Short – RS junior (6'1, 190); 37 Zach Ottinger – senior (6'1, 190); 39 Trey Braithwaite – Fifth Year (6'3, 220); 40 Aidan Major – freshman (5'11, 210); 42 Tommy Beam – freshman (6'7, 200); 43 Daniel Ouderkirk – RS junior (6'9, 255); 45 Michael Kilker – freshman (6'2, 205); 46 Will Watson – freshman (6'6, 235); 48 David Hagaman – freshman (6'4, 185) | Catchers: 10 Joel Gardner – freshman (5'11, 210); 25 McGwire Holbrook – sophomore (6'1, 215); 26 Vince Ippoliti – RS senior (6'0, 200); 33 Dane Leonard – RS junior (6'0, 190); Infielders: 2 Tevin Tucker – RS junior (6'0, 190); 9 Grant Hussey – freshman (6'3, 220); 16 Nathan Blasick – sophomore (6'3, 205); 19 Alex Khan – freshman (6'2, 185); 20 Ben Abernathy – sophomore (5’10, 160); 27 JJ Wetherholt – freshman (5'10, 190); 29 Jimmy Sadler – freshman (6'0, 190); 41 Evan Smith – freshman (6'2, 200); 50 Mikey Kluska – sophomore (6'1, 185); Outfielders: 5 Tyler Cox – freshman (5'10, 170); 6 Victor Scott II – junior (5’11, 190); 13 Braden Berry – sophomore (6'4, 190); 21 Austin Davis – senior (5'11, 175) |

== Schedule and results ==
2022 West Virginia baseball game log (33–22)
Legend: = Win = Loss = Canceled Bold = West Virginia team member
Regular season (33–22)

February (5–2)
| Date | Time (ET) | TV | Opponent | Rank | Stadium | Score | Win | Loss | Save | Attend | Overall Record | Big 12 Record | Sources |
|---|---|---|---|---|---|---|---|---|---|---|---|---|---|
| Feb. 18 | 11:00 am | — | vs. Central Michigan* | — | Springs Brooks Stadium; Conway, SC | **W** 13–8 | **Lowery** **(1–0)** | Patty (0–1) | — | 969 | 1–0 | — | Stats; Story |
| Feb. 19 | 11:00 am | — | vs. Kent State* | — | Spring Brooks Stadium; Conway, SC | **W** 8–3 | **Hampton** **(1–0)** | Romel (0–1) | — | 1,179 | 2–0 | — | Stats; Story |
| Feb. 20 | 11:00 am | — | vs. Central Michigan* | — | Spring Brooks Stadium; Conway, SC | **W** 10–0 | **Sleeper** **(1–0)** | Buczkowski (0–1) | — | 1,055 | 3–0 | — | Stats; Story |
| Feb. 21 | 12:00 pm | ESPN+ | at Coastal Carolina* | — | Springs Brooks Stadium; Conway, SC | **L** 7–9 | Maton (1–0) | **Watters** **(0–1)** | Sharkey (1) | 2,312 | 3–1 | — | Stats; Story |
| Feb. 25 | 4:00 pm | ESPN+ | at Charlotte* | — | Hayes Stadium; Charlotte, NC | **W** 5–4 | **Watters** **(1–1)** | Bruce (0–1) | — | 1,136 | 4–1 | — | Stats; Story |
| Feb. 26 | 12:00 pm | — | at Charlotte* | — | Hayes Field; Charlotte, NC | **W** 9–2 | **Hampton** **(2–0)** | Hansen (0–1) | — | — | 5–1 | — | Stats; Story |
| Feb. 26 | 4:15 pm | — | at Charlotte* | — | Hayes Field; Charlotte, NC | **L** 4–5 | Michelson (1–0) | **Smith** **(0–1)** | Oh (1) | 1,180 | 5–2 | — | Stats; Story |

March (9–7)
| Date | Time (ET) | TV | Opponent | Rank | Stadium | Score | Win | Loss | Save | Attend | Overall Record | Big 12 Record | Sources |
|---|---|---|---|---|---|---|---|---|---|---|---|---|---|
| March 1 | 3:00 pm | ESPN+ | Canisius* | - | Monongalia Co. Ballpark; Granville, WV | **W** 17–3 | **Kilker** **(1–0)** | Guiliano (0–1) | — | 1,356 | 6–2 | — | Stats; Story |
| March 4 | 8:00 pm | B1G+ | at Minnesota* | — | U.S. Bank Stadium; Minneapolis, MN | **W** 5–4 | **Lowery** **(2–0)** | Semb (0–2) | **Watters** **(1)** | 100 | 7–2 | — | Stats; Story |
| March 5 | 4:00 pm | B1G+ | vs. Illinois* | — | U.S. Bank Stadium; Minneapolis, MN | **L** 2–6 | Gowens (1–0) | **Hampton** **(2–1)** | — | 834 | 7–3 | — | Stats; Story |
| March 6 | 11:00 am | B1G+ | vs. Michigan State* | — | U.S. Bank Stadium; Minneapolis, MN | **L** 3–9 | Szczepaniak (2–0) | **Sleeper** **(1–1)** | Bischoff (2) | 375 | 7–4 | — | Stats; Story |
| March 8 | 5:00 pm | — | Rider* | — | Monongalia Co. Ballpark; Granville, WV | **W** 5–4^{(10)} | **Kilker** **(2–0)** | Stalzer (1–1) | — | 1,016 | 8–4 | — | Stats; Story |
| March 11 | 12:00 pm | ESPN+ | Ohio State* | — | Monongalia Co. Ballpark; Granville, WV | **L** 4–10 | Coupet (2–2) | **Reed** **(0–1)** | Hammerberg (1) | 2,280 | 8–5 | — | Stats |
| March 11 | 4:00 pm | ESPN+ | Ohio State* | — | Monongalia Co. Ballpark; Granville, WV | **W** 7–6 | **Lowery** **(3–0)** | Brock (0–2) | — | 2,880 | 9–5 | — | Stats; Story |
| March 13 | 1:00 pm | ESPN+ | Ohio State* | — | Monongalia Co. Ballpark; Granville, WV | **Canceled** | | | | | | | |
| March 15 | 4:00 pm | ACCNX | at Duke* | — | Durham Bulls Athletic Park; Durham, NC | **L** 1–2 | Stinson (1–0) | **Sleeper** **(1–2)** | Loper (3) | 371 | 9–6 | — | Stats; Story |
| March 16 | 4:00 pm | ESPN+ | at High Point* | — | George S. Erath Field; High Point, NC | **Canceled** | | | | | | | |
| March 18 | 6:00 pm | ESPN+ | at Campbell* | — | Jim Perry Stadium; Buies Creek, NC | **L** 6–8 | Harrington (4–1) | **Short** **(0–1)** | — | 670 | 9–7 | — | Stats; Story |
| March 19 | 3:00 pm | ESPN+ | at Campbell* | — | Jim Perry Stadium; Buies Creek, NC | **W** 6–3 | **Hampton** **(3–1)** | Kuehler (0–3) | — | 686 | 10–7 | — | Stats; Story |
| March 20 | 1:00 pm | ESPN+ | at Campbell* | — | Jim Perry Stadium; Buies Creek, NC | **L** 5–6 | Murray (1–0) | **Sleeper** **(1–3)** | Neto (2) | 623 | 10–8 | — | Stats; Story |
| March 22 | 6:30 pm | ESPN+ | Marshall* | — | Monongalia Co. Ballpark; Granville, WV | **Postponed** | | | | | | | |
| March 24 | 6:30 pm | ESPN+ | Youngstown State* | — | Monongalia Co. Ballpark; Granville, WV | **W** 6–4 | **Bravo** **(1–0)** | Rhodes (0–1) | **Braithwaite** **(1)** | 1,379 | 11–8 | — | Stats; Story |
| March 25 | 11:00 am | ESPN+ | Youngstown State* | — | Monongalia Co. Ballpark; Granville, WV | **W** 9–3 | **Hampton** **(4–1)** | Coles (0–2) | — | 1,030 | 12–8 | — | Stats |
| March 25 | 2:30 pm | ESPN+ | Youngstown State* | — | Monongalia Co. Ballpark; Granville, WV | **W** 13–2 | **Watters** **(2–1)** | Brosky (2–3) | — | 1,066 | 13–8 | — | Stats; Story |
| March 29 | 3:00 pm | — | at Marshall* | — | Kennedy Center Field; Huntington, WV | **W** 7–3 | **Bravo** **(2–0)** | Capuano (1–4) | — | 145 | 14–8 | — | Stats; Story |
| March 30 | 5:00 pm | ACCNX | at Pittsburgh* | — | Charles L. Cost Field; Pittsburgh, PA | **L** 6–9 | Devereux (2–0) | **Sleeper** **(1–4)** | Stuart (3) | 340 | 14–9 | — | Stats; Story |

April (11–7)
| Date | Time (ET) | TV | Opponent | Rank | Stadium | Score | Win | Loss | Save | Attend | Overall Record | Big 12 Record | Sources |
|---|---|---|---|---|---|---|---|---|---|---|---|---|---|
| April 1 | 7:00 pm | ESPN+ | at #12 TCU | — | Lupton Stadium; Fort Worth, TX | **W** 3–2 | **Braithwaite** **(1–0)** | Ridings (2–1) | **Short** **(1)** | 3,902 | 15–9 | 1–0 | Stats; Story |
| April 2 | 3:00 pm | ESPN+ | at #12 TCU | — | Lupton Stadium; Fort Worth, TX | **L** 4–5 | Perez (2–1) | **Hampton** **(4–2)** | Ridings (8) | 4,668 | 15–10 | 1–1 | Stats; Story |
| April 3 | 1:00 pm | ESPN+ | at #12 TCU | — | Lupton Stadium; Fort Worth, TX | **W** 5–2 | **Bravo** **(3–0)** | Walker (3–1) | **Braithwaite** **(2)** | 4,013 | 16–10 | 2–1 | Stats; Story |
| April 6 | 3:00 pm | ESPN+ | Marshall* | — | Monongalia Co. Ballpark; Granville, WV | **W** 17–8 | **Ottinger** **(1–0)** | Heiner (0–2) | — | 2,115 | 17–10 | — | Stats; Story |
| April 8 | 5:00 pm | ESPN+ | Baylor | — | Monongalia Co. Ballpark; Granville, WV | **W** 7–6 | **Braithwaite** **(2–0)** | Marriott (2–1) | — | 2,291 | 18–10 | 3–1 | Stats; Story |
| April 9 | 1:00 pm | ESPN+ | Baylor | — | Monongalia Co. Ballpark; Granville, WV | **W** 8–4 | **Hampton** **(5–2)** | Andrade (2–1) | **Ottinger** **(1)** | 2,463 | 19–10 | 4–1 | Stats; Story |
| April 10 | 1:00 pm | ESPN+ | Baylor | — | Monongalia Co. Ballpark; Granville, WV | **W** 7–5 | **Sleeper** **(2–4)** | Jackson (2–3) | **Braithwaite** **(3)** | 2,652 | 20–10 | 5–1 | Stats; Story |
| April 12 | 6:00 pm | B1G+ | at Penn State* | — | Medlar Field; University Park, PA | **W** 8–4 | **Major** **(1–0)** | Molsky (0–5) | — | 805 | 21–10 | — | Stats; Story |
| April 15 | 6:30 pm | ESPN+ | #5 Oklahoma State | — | Monongalia Co. Ballpark; Granville, WV | **L** 1–2 | Campbell (5–1) | **Watters** **(2–2)** | McLean (2) | 3,291 | 21–11 | 5–2 | Stats; Story |
| April 16 | 4:00 pm | ESPN+ | #5 Oklahoma State | — | Monongalia Co. Ballpark; Granville, WV | **W** 5–2 | **Hampton** **(6–2)** | Mederos (3–2) | **Braithwaite** **(4)** | 2,825 | 22–11 | 6–2 | Stats; Story |
| April 17 | 1:00 pm | ESPN+ | #5 Oklahoma State | — | Monongalia Co. Ballpark; Granville, WV | **L** 3–13^{(8)} | Osmond (3–1) | **Bravo** **(3–1)** | — | 1,840 | 22–12 | 6–3 | Stats; Story |
| April 20 | 1:00 pm | ACCNX | vs. Pittsburgh* | — | PNC Park; Pittsburgh, PA | **W** 3–2^{(11)} | **Abernathy** **(1–0)** | Devereux (3–2) | — | 861 | 23–12 | — | Stats; Story |
| April 22 | 7:30 pm | ESPN+ | at #9 Texas Tech | — | Dan Law Field; Lubbock, TX | **L** 5–7 | Morris (5–0) | **Watters** **(2–3)** | — | | 23–13 | 6–4 | Stats |
| April 23 | 3:00 pm | ESPN+ | at #9 Texas Tech | — | Dan Law Field; Lubbock, TX | **L** 2–12^{(8)} | Birdsell (6–2) | **Hampton** **(6–3)** | — | 4,432 | 23–14 | 6–5 | Stats; Story |
| April 24 | 2:00 pm | ESPN+ | at #9 Texas Tech | — | Dan Law Field; Lubbock, TX | **W** 15–4 | **Smith** **(1–1)** | Molina (1–5) | **Braithwaite** **(5)** | 3,973 | 24–14 | 7–5 | Stats; Story |
| April 27 | 6:30 pm | ESPN+ | Penn State* | | Monongalia Co. Ballpark; Granville, WV | **L** 4–8 | Mellott (3–4) | **Ottinger** **(1–1)** | — | 2,612 | 24–15 | — | Stats; Story |
| April 29 | 7:00 pm | ESPN+ | at Kansas | | Hoglund Ballpark; Lawrence, KS | **L** 3–7 | Hegarty (5–4) | **Watters** **(2–4)** | — | 663 | 24–16 | 7–6 | Stats; Story |
| April 30 | 3:00 pm | ESPN+ | at Kansas | | Hoglund Ballpark; Lawrence, KS | **W** 10–7 | **Sleeper** **(3–4)** | Allen (2–2) | **Smith** **(1)** | 808 | 25–16 | 8–6 | Stats; Story |

May (8–4)
| Date | Time (ET) | TV | Opponent | Rank | Stadium | Score | Win | Loss | Save | Attend | Overall Record | Big 12 Record | Sources |
|---|---|---|---|---|---|---|---|---|---|---|---|---|---|
| May 1 | 1:00 pm | ESPN+ | at Kansas | | Hoglund Ballpark; Lawrence, KS | **W** 10–8 | **Ottinger** **(2–1)** | Vanderhei (5–4) | **Braithwaite** **(6)** | 739 | 26–16 | 9–6 | Stats; Story |
| May 4 | 6:00 pm | — | Charleston* | | Monongalia Co. Ballpark; Granville, WV | **W** 3–2 | **Ouderkirk** **(1–0)** | Peschl (2–1) | — | 1,226 | 27–16 | — | Stats; Story |
| May 7 | 2:00 pm | ESPN+ | Texas | | Monongalia Co. Ballpark; Granville, WV | **L** 2–5 | Hansen (8–1) | **Watters** **(2–5)** | — | 3,213 | 27–17 | 9–7 | Stats |
| May 7 | 5:30 pm | ESPN+ | Texas | | Monongalia Co. Ballpark; Granville, WV | **L** 0–11^{(7)} | Gordon (5–1) | **Hampton** **(6–4)** | — | 3,213 | 27–18 | 9–8 | Stats; Story |
| May 8 | 1:00 pm | ESPN+ | Texas | | Monongalia Co. Ballpark; Granville, WV | **W** 8–6 | **Braithwaite** **(3–0)** | Stevens (5–6) | **Short** **(2)** | 2,833 | 28–18 | 10–8 | Stats; Story |
| May 10 | 6:30 pm | ESPN+ | Pittsburgh* | | Monongalia Co. Ballpark; Granville, WV | **W** 9–1 | **Major** **(2–0)** | Bautista (0–1) | — | 3,169 | 29–18 | — | Stats; Story |
| May 13 | 7:30 pm | — | at Oklahoma | | L. Dale Mitchell Park; Norman, OK | **L** 1–15 | Bennett (5–3) | **Watters** **(2–6)** | — | 1,450 | 29–19 | 10–9 | Stats; Story |
| May 14 | 3:00 pm | — | at Oklahoma | | L. Dale Mitchell Park; Norman, OK | **W** 9–8 | **Hampton** **(7–4)** | Sandlin; 5–3 | **Braithwaite** **(7)** | 1,392 | 30–19 | 11–9 | Stats; Story |
| May 15 | 3:00 pm | — | at Oklahoma | | L. Dale Mitchell Park; Norman, OK | **L** 7–17^{(7)} | Michael (4–1) | **Ottinger** **(2–2)** | — | 1,584 | 30–20 | 11–10 | Stats; Story |
| May 19 | 6:30 pm | ESPN+ | Kansas State | | Monongalia Co. Ballpark; Granville, WV | **W** 15–4 | **Watters** **(3–6)** | Adams (5–6) | — | 2,934 | 31–20 | 12–10 | Stats; Story |
| May 20 | 6:30 pm | ESPN+ | Kansas State | | Monongalia Co. Ballpark; Granville, WV | **W** 15–4 | **Hampton** **(8–4)** | Fajardo (4–2) | — | 2,918 | 32–20 | 13–10 | Stats; Story |
| May 21 | 12:00 pm | ESPN+ | Kansas State | | Monongalia Co. Ballpark; Granville, WV | **W** 5–1 | **Major** **(5–1)** | Phillips (0–1) | **Braithwaite** **(8)** | 2,669 | 33–20 | 14–10 | Stats; Story |

Postseason (0–2)

Big 12 Tournament (0–2)
| Date | Time (ET) | TV | Opponent | Seed | Stadium | Score | Win | Loss | Save | Attend | Overall Record | Tourney Record | Sources |
|---|---|---|---|---|---|---|---|---|---|---|---|---|---|
| May 25 | 7:30 pm | ESPN+ | vs. (3) Oklahoma | (6) | Globe Life Field; Arlington, TX | **L** 4–6 | Campbell (3–0) | **Watters** **(3–7)** | — | 5,528 | 33–21 | 0–1 | Stats; Story |
| May 26 | 1:30 pm | ESPN+ | vs. (7) Kansas State | (6) | Globe Life Field; Arlington, TX | **L** 5–8 | Adams (6–6) | **Hampton** **(8–5)** | Phillips (7) | — | 33–22 | 0–2 | Stats; Story |

* indicates a non-conference game. All rankings from D1Baseball on the date of the contest.

== Rankings ==
Ranking movements Legend: ██ Increase in ranking ██ Decrease in ranking — = Not ranked RV = Received votes
| | Week | | | | | | | | | | | | | | | | | | |
| Poll | Pre | 1 | 2 | 3 | 4 | 5 | 6 | 7 | 8 | 9 | 10 | 11 | 12 | 13 | 14 | 15 | 16 | 17 | Final |
|---|---|---|---|---|---|---|---|---|---|---|---|---|---|---|---|---|---|---|---|
| Coaches' | — | —* | RV | RV | — | — | — | — | — | RV | RV | RV | — | — | — | — | — | — | — |
| Baseball America | — | — | — | — | — | — | — | — | — | — | — | — | — | — | — | — | — | — | — |
| Collegiate Baseball^ | — | 30 | — | — | — | — | — | — | 24 | 28 | — | — | — | — | — | — | — | — | — |
| NCBWA† | RV | RV | RV | — | — | — | RV | RV | RV | RV | | | | — | RV | — | — | — | — |
| D1Baseball | — | — | — | — | — | — | — | — | — | — | — | — | — | — | — | | — | — | — |

^ Collegiate Baseball ranked 40 teams in their preseason poll, but only ranked 30 teams weekly during the season.
† NCBWA ranks 30 teams in their preseason poll, but only ranks 25 teams weekly during the season.
* A new poll was not released for this week, so for comparison purposes, the previous week's ranking is inserted in this week's slot.
