= Leah Yerpe =

- Education: State University of New York at Fredonia (2003–2007); Pratt Institute (2007–2009)
- Occupation: Artist

Leah Yerpe is an American artist most well-known for her, primarily black-and-white, drawings of people. Yerpe's drawings often include figures that appear to be falling or tumbling down the page. She currently lives and works in Brooklyn, NY.

== Early life ==
Yerpe was born and raised in Cattaraugus County, NY. She grew up around farms in western New York. The subjects of her early drawings were often drawn from the natural world she experienced in her youth.

== Education ==
Yerpe attended the State University of New York at Fredonia, Fredonia, NY. She graduated summa cum laude in 2007 with a B.F.A. in Painting and Drawing and a Minor in Art History.

For her graduate studies, Yerpe attended the Pratt Institute in Brooklyn, NY. She earned her M.F.A. in Painting and Drawing in 2009.

== Work ==
Yerpe's drawings are often sized to human scale. Her drawings regularly take hundreds of hours to complete, refining details as fine as individual hairs. Daniel Maidman of HuffPost has described Yerpe as "an artist of this extraordinarily rare type" and her work as "ultracrisp, high contrast, supercool."

== Exhibitions ==
=== Solo exhibitions ===
==== 2016 ====
- Levitation, Anna Zorina Gallery, New York City

==== 2014 ====
- Constellations, Purdue University, West Lafayette, IN
- Stellify, Dillon Gallery, New York City

==== 2013 ====
- Stellify, The Gallery at Le Poisson Rouge, New York City

==== 2012 ====
- Infinitum, Dacia Gallery, New York City

==== 2011 ====
- Illumination, Dacia Gallery, New York City

==== 2010 ====
- Lost in Space, Weeks Gallery, Olean, NY

==== 2009 ====
- Leah Yerpe: Thesis Exhibition, Pratt Studios Gallery, Brooklyn, NY

==== 2004 ====
- Images in Black and White, Jamestown Community College, Olean, NY

=== Group exhibitions ===
==== 2017 ====
- Summer Cool, Anna Zorina Gallery, New York City
- Upbeat, Anna Zorina Gallery, New York City

==== 2016 ====
- Summer Hours, Anna Zorina Gallery, New York City
- A Fine Line: Masterwork Drawings, Paul Mahder Gallery, Healdsburg, CA
- Art on Paper, art fair, New York City
- Winter Tales, Anna Zorina Gallery, New York City
