= Buffalo Baseball Hall of Fame =

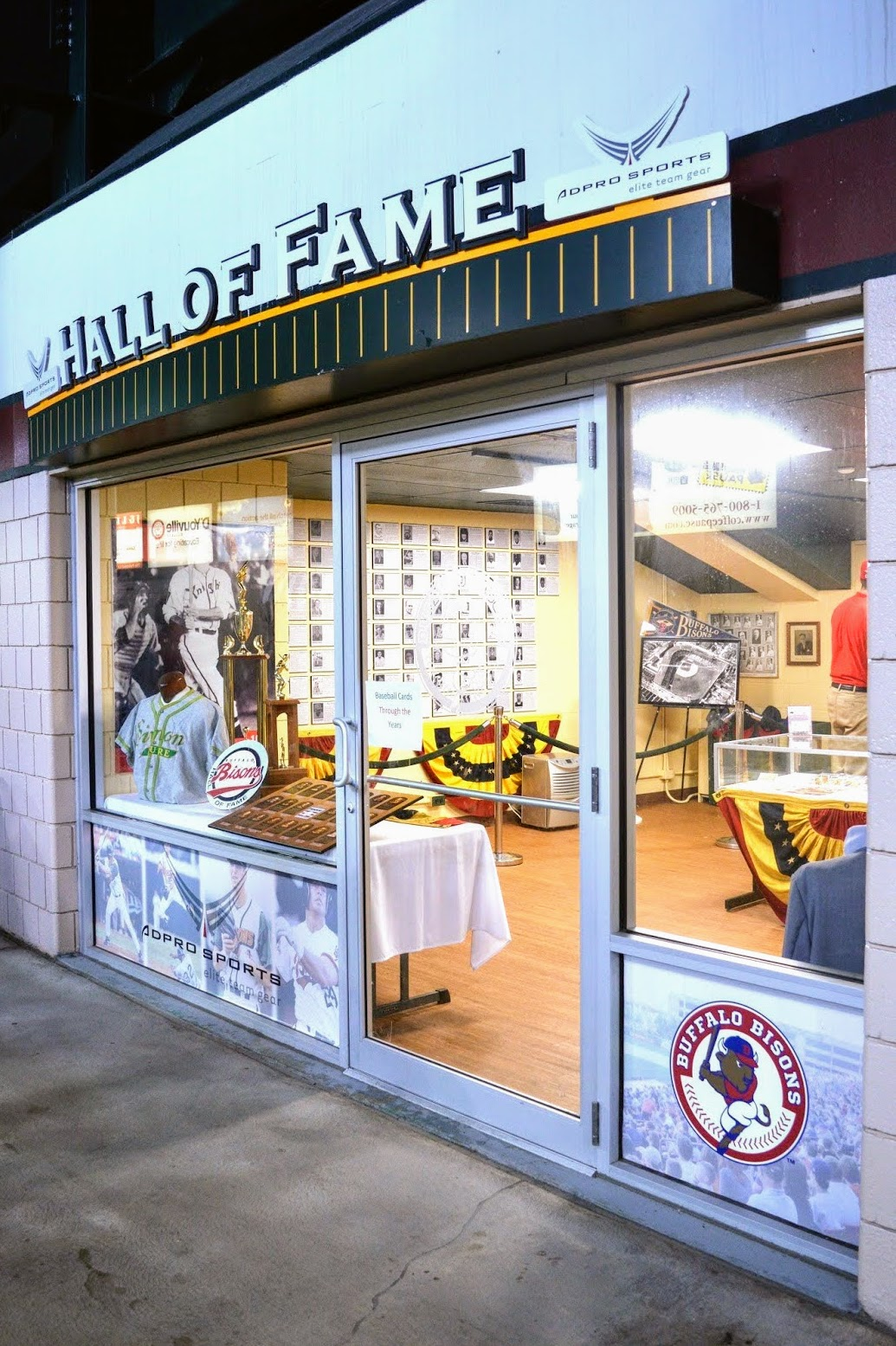
- Established: 1985
- Location: Buffalo, New York, United States
- Type: Hall of Fame
- Director: Buffalo Bisons
- Curator: John Boutet
- Website: Official website

The Buffalo Baseball Hall of Fame was started by the Buffalo Bisons organization in 1985 to honor former members of the Buffalo Bisons (1878, 1887–1888), Buffalo Bisons (1879–1885), Buffalo Bisons (1886–1970), Buffalo Bisons (1890), Buffalo Blues (1914–1915), Buffalo Bisons (1979–present), and other contributors to professional baseball in Western New York.

Plaques honoring all members of the Buffalo Baseball Hall of Fame were displayed within the Hall of Fame and Heritage Room at Sahlen Field before its removal in 2021.

== Inductees ==
=== 1980s ===
- Roger Baker (1985)
- Dan Brouthers (1985)
- Ollie Carnegie (1985)
- Luke Easter (1985)
- Pud Galvin (1985)
- Fred Hutchinson (1985)
- Billy Kelly (1985)
- Joe McCarthy (1985)
- Frank Offermann (1985)
- Warren Spahn (1985)
- John Stiglmeier (1985)
- Del Bissonette (1986)
- Frank Carswell (1986)
- Jimmy Collins (1986)
- George Stallings (1986)
- Bob Stedler (1986)
- Ollie Tucker (1986)
- Deacon White (1986)
- Kerby Farrell (1987)
- Marvin Jacobs (1987)
- Rube Kisinger (1987)
- Donald V. Labbruzzo (1987)
- Jim Franklin (1988)
- Frank Gilhooley (1988)
- Frank Grant (1988)
- James D. Griffin (1988)
- Greg Mulleavy (1988)
- Dan Carnevale (1989)
- Bill Clymer (1989)
- Pancho Herrera (1989)

=== 1990s ===
- Beauty McGowan (1990)
- Ray Schalk (1990)
- Jimmy Walsh (1990)
- Buck Crouse (1991)
- Jake Gettman (1991)
- Coaker Triplett (1991)
- Terry Collins (1992)
- Joe DeSa (1992)
- Johnny Groth (1992)
- Jim Murray (1992)
- Jim O'Rourke (1992)
- Robert E. Rich Sr. (1992)
- Vince McNamara (1993)
- Robert E. Rich Jr. (1993)
- Hal White (1993)
- Bill Harris (1994)
- Sal Maglie (1994)
- Al Moore (1994)
- Joe Overfield (1994)
- Sibby Sisti (1994)
- Babe Birrer (1995)
- Joe Brown (1995)
- Rick Lancellotti (1995)
- Buddy Rosar (1995)
- Cy Williams (1995)
- Joe Alli (1996)
- Steve Farr (1996)
- Ralph Hubbell (1996)
- Cy Kritzer (1996)
- Frankie Pytlak (1996)
- Mike Billoni (1997)
- George Daddario (1997)
- Mayo Smith (1998)
- Dorn Taylor (1998)
- Melinda R. Rich (1999)
- Pete Weber (1999)

=== 2000s ===
- Joe Caffie (2000)
- Bill Mazer (2000)
- Stan Barron (2001)
- Torey Lovullo (2003)
- Jeff Manto (2003)
- Tom Prince (2004)
- Rick Reed (2006)
- Don Colpoys (2007)
- Bill Selby (2007)
- Dave Clark (2008)
- Brian Graham (2008)
- Carlos García (2009)
- Dave Hollins (2009)

=== 2010s ===
- Duke McGuire (2010)
- Richie Sexson (2010)
- Tony Peña (2011)
- Jim Rosenhaus (2011)
- Brian Giles (2012)
- Russ Morman (2012)
- Mike Harrington (2013)
- Dave Roberts (2013)
- Ernie Young (2013)
- Bob Miske (2014)
- Greg Tubbs (2014)
- Eric Wedge (2014)
- Chris Coste (2015)
- Greg LaRocca (2015)
- Kevin Lester (2015)
- Alex Ramírez (2016)
- Ted Savage (2016)
- Jason Jacome (2017)
- Mark Ryal (2017)
- Joe Roa (2018)
- Marty Brown (2018)
- Brian Dorsett (2019)

=== 2020s ===
- Ben Francisco (2022)
- Jhonny Peralta (2022)
- Bob Patterson (2022)
- Matt Hague (2023)
- Pete Filson (2023)
- Jonathan Dandes (2023)
- Mike Buczkowski (2024)
- Brandon Phillips (2024)
- Brian Anderson (2025)
- Greg Brown (2025)
- Jolbert Cabrera (2025)
- Jesús Feliciano (2026)
- Mike Poreda (2026)
