= 2022 Oklahoma Sooners baseball team =

College Baseball Season

2022 Oklahoma Sooners baseball

Big 12 Tournament champion NCAA Gainesville Regional Champion Blacksburg Super Regional Champion

College World Series, Finals, 0–2
- Conference: Big 12 Conference
- Record: 45–24 (15–9 Big 12)
- Head coach: Skip Johnson (5th season)
- Assistant coaches: Clay Overcash (5th season); Clay Van Hook (5th season); Reggie Willits (1st season)
- Home stadium: L. Dale Mitchell Baseball Park

2022 Big 12 Conference baseball standings
	Conf.				Overall
Team	W		L	PCT	W		L	PCT
No. 23 TCU ‍†‍‍^{y}	16	–	8	.667	38	–	22	.633
Oklahoma State ‍‍‍^{y}	15	–	9	.625	42	–	22	.656
No. 2 Oklahoma ‍‍‡‍^{y}	15	–	9	.625	45	–	24	.652
No. 24 Texas Tech ‍‍‍^{y}	15	–	9	.625	39	–	22	.639
No. 8 Texas ‍‍‍^{y}	14	–	10	.583	47	–	22	.681
West Virginia ‍‍‍	14	–	10	.583	33	–	22	.600
Kansas State ‍‍‍	8	–	16	.333	29	–	29	.500
Baylor ‍‍‍	7	–	17	.292	26	–	28	.481
Kansas ‍‍‍	4	–	20	.167	20	–	35	.364
† – Conference champion ‡ – Tournament champion y – Invited to the NCAA tournament Rankings from D1baseball

The 2022 Oklahoma Sooners baseball team represented the University of Oklahoma during the 2022 NCAA Division I baseball season. The Sooners played their home games at L. Dale Mitchell Baseball Park as a member of the Big 12 Conference. They were led by head coach Skip Johnson, in his 5th season at Oklahoma.

== Previous season ==
The 2021 team finished the season with a 27–28 record and an 11–13 record in the Big 12. In the 2021 Big 12 Conference baseball tournament, the fifth-seeded Sooners fell to fourth-seeded Oklahoma State 5–9 and top-seeded Texas 1–4 to end their conference tournament in the First Round. The Sooners did not earn an at-large bid to the 2021 NCAA Division I baseball tournament.

== Personnel ==
=== Coaching staff ===
Name	Position	Seasons at OU	Alma mater
Skip Johnson	Head coach	5	University of Texas–Pan American (1990)
Clay Overcash	Assistant Coach	5	USC Upstate (1990)
Clay Van Hook	Assistant Coach	5	Texas (2008)
Reggie Willits	Volunteer Assistant	1	Oklahoma (2014)

=== Roster ===
2022 Oklahoma Sooners Roster
Pitchers: 14 Carter Campbell – sophomore (6'2", 180); 17 Aaron Calhoun – freshman (5'10", 165); 18 Creed Watkins – RS sophomore (6'5", 220); 23 Jaret Godman – RS junior (6'1", 190); 25 Keegan Allen – freshman (6'0", 185); 27 Braden Carmichael – RS junior (5'10", 178); 28 David Sandlin – RS sophomore (6'4", 215); 29 Jett Lodes – sophomore (5'10", 161); 30 Nicholas Andrews – RS freshman (6'2", 220); 32 Colton Sundloff – freshman (6'5", 200); 34 Carson Atwood – sophomore (6'0", 206); 35 Javier Ramos – RS sophomore (6'6", 206); 36 Luke Carrell – freshman (6'2", 190); 40 Brayden Luikart – freshman (6'0", 185); 42 Luc Fladda – freshman (6'1", 180); 45 Ben Abram – RS junior (6'7", 243); 48 Chazz Martinez – RS sophomore (6'3", 210); 50 Cade Brown – RS junior (6'4", 233); 52 Griffin Miller – RS junior (6'4", 210); 54 Jake Bennett – RS sophomore (6'6", 234); 58 Zachery Carrell – RS sophomore (6'1", 192); 99 Trevin Michael – graduate student (6'2", 200)	Catchers: 3 Jimmy Crooks – RS sophomore (6'0", 218); 16 Hudson Polk – sophomore (6'1", 201); 31 Kade Fletcher – RS sophomore (6'2", 215); Infielders: 2 Trent Brown – RS sophomore (5'11", 183); 5 Mason Lowe – RS junior (5'11", 180); 6 Wallace Clark – freshman (6'0", 180); 9 Cade Horton – RS freshman (6'1", 211); 12 Brett Squires – RS junior (6'3", 205); 15 Jackson Nicklaus – freshman (6'0", 190); 20 Peyton Graham – RS sophomore (6'4", 171); 21 Max McGwire – freshman (6'2", 185); 22 Brock Daniels – freshman (6'1", 185); 26 Blake Robertson – RS sophomore (6'5", 200); Outfielders: 1 Diego Muniz – RS junior (5'8", 190); 7 Kendall Pettis – RS sophomore (5'11", 187); 8 John Spikerman – freshman (6'0", 180); 10 Tanner Tredaway – RS senior (6'0", 188); 11 Sebastian Orduno – RS sophomore (5'10", 190); 46 Jack Connelly – Junior (6'0", 195)

== Schedule and results ==
2022 Oklahoma baseball game log (45–24)
Legend: = Win = Loss = Canceled Bold = Oklahoma team member
Regular season (33–20)

February (5–2)
Date	Time (CT)	TV	Opponent	Rank	Stadium	Score	Win	Loss	Save	Attend	Overall Record	Big 12 Record	Sources
Feb. 18	11:00 am	FloSports	vs. Auburn*	—	Globe Life Field; Arlington, TX	**W** 3–0	**Sundloff** **(1–0)**	Mullins (0–1)	**Godman** **(1)**	7,112	1–0	—	Stats; Story
Feb. 19	7:00 pm	FloSports	vs. No. 15 Arizona*	—	Globe Life Field; Arlington, TX	**L** 4–14	Flanagan (1–0)	**Sandlin** **(0–1)**	—	10,515	1–1	—	Stats; Story
Feb. 20	6:30 pm	FloSports	vs. Michigan*	—	Globe Life Field; Arlington, TX	**W** 6–1	**Atwood** **(1–0)**	O'Halloran (0–1)	—	8,006	2–1	—	Stats; Story
Feb. 22	2:30 pm	-	Wichita State*	—	Mitchell Park; Norman, OK	**W** 6–2	**Carmichael** **(1–0)**	Boyer (0–1)	**Michael** **(1)**	386	3–1	—	Stats; Story
Feb. 25	12:00 pm	—	vs. Northwestern State*	—	Globe Life Field; Arlington, TX	**L** 2–4	Taylor (1–0)	**Atwood** **(1–1)**	Cossio (1)	4,672	3–2	—	Stats
Feb. 26	6:30 pm	—	vs. Northwestern State*	—	Globe Life Field; Arlington, TX	**W** 2–1	**Sandlin** **(1–1)**	Prestwich (0–1)	**Michael** **(2)**	5,974	4–2	—	Stats; Story
Feb. 27	5:30 pm	—	vs. Northwestern State*	—	Globe Life Field; Arlington, TX	**W** 5–1	**Martinez** **(1–0)**	Brown (0–1)	—	4,895	5–2	—	Stats; Story

March (10–6)
Date	Time (CT)	TV	Opponent	Rank	Stadium	Score	Win	Loss	Save	Attend	Overall Record	Big 12 Record	Sources
March 4	3:00 pm	MLB; Network	vs. No. 7 LSU*	—	Minute Maid Park; Houston, TX	**L** 4–5^{(11)}	Collins (1–0)	**Miller** **(0–1)**	—	16,515	5–3	—	Stats; Story
March 5	11:00 am	MLB; Network	vs. UCLA*	—	Minute Maid Park; Houston, TX	**L** 3–15^{(7)}	Flanagan (1–0)	**Sandlin** **(1–2)**	—	24,787	5–4	—	Stats; Story
March 6	11:00 am	MLB; Network	vs. No. 17 Tennessee*	—	Minute Maid Park; Houston, TX	**L** 0–8	Beam (2–0)	**Martinez** **(1–1)**	—	12,577	5–5	—	Stats; Story
March 8	3:00 pm	—	Dallas Baptist*	—	Mitchell Park; Norman, OK	**W** 8–7	**Michael** **(1–0)**	Heaton (0–1)	**Godman** **(2)**	381	6–5	—	Stats; Story
March 12	2:00 pm	—	UTSA*	—	Mitchell Park; Norman, OK	**W** 10–5	**Bennett** **(1–0)**	Jimenez (2–1)	—	750	7–5	—	Stats; Story
March 13	12:00 pm	—	UTSA*	—	Mitchell Park; Norman, OK	**W** 8–3	**Sandlin** **(2–2)**	Quiroga (1–2)	—	725	8–5	—	Stats
March 13	4:00 pm	—	UTSA*	—	Mitchell Park; Norman, OK	**W** 9–5	**Martinez** **(2–1)**	Davis (1–1)	**Michael** **(3)**	725	9–5	—	Stats; Story
March 15	4:00 pm	BSOK	Air Force*	—	Mitchell Park; Norman, OK	**W** 10–4	**Atwood** **(2–1)**	Benge (0–2)	—	850	10–5	—	Stats; Story
March 16	2:00 pm	BSOK	Air Force*	—	Mitchell Park; Norman, OK	**W** 8–7	**Ramos** **(1–0)**	Hawks (0–1)	**Godman** **(3)**	1,115	11–5	—	Stats; Story
March 18	6:30 pm	—	New Orleans*	—	Mitchell Park; Norman, OK	**L** 7–10^{(12)}	Seroski (2–1)	**Atwood** **(2–2)**	—	746	11–6	—	Stats; Story
March 19	2:00 pm	—	New Orleans*	—	Mitchell Park; Norman, OK	**W** 13–8	**Sundloff** **(2–0)**	Mitchell (0–2)	—	1,006	12–6	—	Stats; Story
March 20	2:00 pm	—	New Orleans*	—	Mitchell Park; Norman, OK	**L** 5–11	Horton (2–0)	**Martinez** **(2–2)**	—	746	12–7	—	Stats; Story
March 25	6:30 pm	BSOKX	Baylor	—	Mitchell Park; Norman, OK	**W** 5–3	**Bennett** **(2–0)**	Thomas (3–3)	**Michael** **(4)**	1,306	13–7	1–0	Stats; Story
March 26	2:00 pm	—	Baylor	—	Mitchell Park; Norman, OK	**W** 9–5	**Abram** **(1–0)**	Voelker (1–4)	—	1,334	14–7	2–0	Stats; Story
March 27	2:00 pm	BSOK	Baylor	—	Mitchell Park; Norman, OK	**L** 8–16	Caley (1–0)	**Atwood** **(2–3)**	Jackson (1)	1,017	14–8	2–1	Stats; Story
March 29	7:00 pm	—	vs. No. 6 Oklahoma State*	—	Oneok Field; Tulsa, OK	**W** 7–6	**Horton** **(1–0)**	Martin (1–1)	—	7,061	15–8	—	Stats; Story

April (12–6)
Date	Time (CT)	TV	Opponent	Rank	Stadium	Score	Win	Loss	Save	Attend	Overall Record	Big 12 Record	Sources
April 1	6:30 pm	BSOKX	vs. No. 8 Texas	—	Globe Life Field; Arlington, TX	**L** 1–7	Hansen (5–0)	**Bennett** **(2–1)**	—	5,012	15–9	2–2	Stats; Story
April 2	12:00 pm	ESPN2	vs. No. 8 Texas	—	Globe Life Field; Arlington, TX	**W** 4–2	**Michael** **(2–0)**	Stevens (4–2)	—	7,554	16–9	3–2	Stats; Story
April 3	12:00 pm	ESPN	vs. No. 8 Texas	—	Globe Life Field; Arlington, TX	**L** 8–12	Cobb (2–0)	**Ramos** **(1–1)**	—	6,518	16–10	3–3	Stats; Story
April 5	6:30 pm	—	Oral Roberts*	—	Mitchell Park; Norman, OK	**W** 8–2	**Carmichael** **(2–0)**	Wolf (0–2)	—	1,036	17–10	—	Stats; Story
April 8	6:00 pm	ESPN+	at No. 6 Oklahoma State	—	O'Brate Stadium; Stillwater, OK	**W** 8–7	**Campbell** **(1–0)**	Martin (1–2)	**Michael** **(5)**	6,530	18–10	4–3	Stats; Story
April 9	8:00 pm	ESPNU	at No. 6 Oklahoma State	—	O'Brate Stadium; Stillwater, OK	**L** 7–8	McLean (1–0)	**Horton** **(1–1)**	—	7,811	18–11	4–4	Stats; Story
April 10	3:00 pm	ESPN+	at No. 6 Oklahoma State	—	O'Brate Stadium; Stillwater, OK	**L** 4–9	Osmond (2–1)	**Martinez** **(2–3)**	—	6,653	18–12	4–5	Stats; Story
April 12	6:00 pm	ESPN+	vs. No. 4 Texas Tech*	—	Hodgetown; Amarillo, TX	**W** 14–9	**Carmichael** **(3–0)**	Becker (2–1)	—	7,239	19–12	—	Stats; Story
April 14	6:30 pm	—	Pacific*	—	Mitchell Park; Norman, OK	**W** 7–3	**Horton** **(2–1)**	Guarin (0–3)	—	656	20–12	—	Stats; Story
April 15	6:30 pm	—	Lamar*	—	Mitchell Park; Norman, OK	**L** 11–14	Douthit (5–1)	**Bennett** **(2–2)**	—	916	20–13	—	Stats; Story
April 16	11:00 am	—	Pacific*	—	Mitchell Park; Norman, OK	**W** 10–2	**Sandlin** **(3–2)**	Patterson (1–4)	—	580	21–13	—	Stats; Story
April 19	6:30 pm	—	Wichita State*	—	Mitchell Park; Norman, OK	**W** 9–5	**Godman** **(1–0)**	McDonough (3–2)	**Michael** **(6)**	845	22–13	—	Stats; Story
April 22	6:00 pm	ESPN+	at Kansas	—	Hoglund Ballpark; Lawrence, KS	**W** 15–2	**Bennett** **(3–2)**	Hegarty (4–4)	—	1,289	23–13	5–5	Stats; Story
April 23	12:00 pm	ESPN+	at Kansas	—	Hoglund Ballpark; Lawrence, KS	**W** 7–6^{(14)}	**Michael** **(3–0)**	Allen (1–1)	—	802	24–13	6–5	Stats; Story
April 24	1:00 pm	ESPN+	at Kansas	—	Hoglund Ballpark; Lawrence, KS	**W** 24–4	**Martinez** **(3–3)**	Vanderhei (5–3)	—	963	25–13	7–5	Stats; Story
April 26	6:00 pm	ESPN+	at Oral Roberts*	—	J. L. Johnson Stadium; Tulsa, OK	**L** 1–5	Archambo (4–1)	**Carmichael** **(3–1)**	—	1,370	25–14	—	
April 29	6:30 pm	–	Kansas State	-	Mitchell Park; Norman, OK	**W** 14–2	**Bennett** **(4–2)**	McCullough (3–3)	–	1,112	26–14	8–5	
April 30	2:00 pm	BSOK	Kansas State	—	Mitchell Park; Norman, OK	**W** 22–10	**Sandlin** **(4–2)**	Hassall (4–5)	–	1,625	27–14	9–5	

May (5–6)
Date	Time (CT)	TV	Opponent	Rank	Stadium	Score	Win	Loss	Save	Attend	Overall Record	Big 12 Record	Sources
May 1	2:00 pm	—	Kansas State	—	Mitchell Park; Norman, OK	**L** 7–8	Corsentino (3–4)	**Michael** **(3–1)**	Philips (3)	1,174	27–15	9–6	
May 3	6:30 pm	—	at Dallas Baptist*	–	Horner Ballpark; Dallas, Texas,	**L** 1–10	Sherlin (3–0)	**Carmichael** (3–2)	–	1,313	27–16	—	
May 6	6:00 pm	ESPN+	at No. 24 TCU	–	Lupton Stadium; Fort Worth, TX	**L** 7–9	Brown (3–2)	**Bennett** (4–3)	Wright (3)	4,324	27–17	9–7	
May 7	2:00 pm	ESPN+	at No. 24 TCU	–	Lupton Stadium; Fort Worth, TX	**W** 11–7	**Sandlin** (4–3)	Perez (4–2)	**Martinez** (1)	4,055	28–17	10–7	
May 8	1:00 pm	ESPN+	at No. 24 TCU	–	Lupton Stadium; Fort Worth, TX	**W** 5–1	**Campbell** (2–0)	Bolden (4–1)	**Trevin** (7)	3,948	29–17	11–7	
May 13	6:30 pm	—	West Virginia	–	Mitchell Park; Norman, OK	**W** 15–1	**Bennett** (5–3)	Watters (2–6)	–	1,450	30–17	12–7	
May 14	2:00 pm	BSOK	West Virginia	–	Mitchell Park; Norman, OK	**L** 8–9	Hampton (7–4)	**Sandlin** (5–3)	Braithwaite (7)	1,392	30–18	12–8	
May 15	12:00 pm	—	West Virginia	–	Mitchell Park; Norman, OK	**W** 17–7	**Michael** (4–1)	Ottinger (2–2)	–	1,584	31–18	13–8	
May 16	6:00 pm	ESPN+	at Wichita State*	–	Eck Stadium; Wichita, KS	**L** 0–18	Miner (1–3)	Calhoun (0–1)	–	2,362	31–19	—	
May 19	6:30 pm	ESPN+	at No. 5 Texas Tech	–	Dan Law Field; Lubbock, TX	**W** 13–8	**Bennett** (6–3)	Morris (7–1)	–	3,829	32–19	14–8	
May 20	6:30 pm	ESPN+	at No. 5 Texas Tech	–	Dan Law Field; Lubbock, TX	**W** 9–6	**Sandlin** (6–3)	Birdsell (8–3)	**Trevin** (8)	4,432	33–19	15–8	
May 21	2:00 pm	ESPN+	at No. 5 Texas Tech	–	Dan Law Field; Lubbock, TX	**L** 2–10	Hampton (5–3)	**Horton** (2–2)	–	4,432	33–20	15–9	

Postseason (12–3)

Big 12 Tournament (4–0)
Date	Time (CT)	TV	Opponent	Seed	Stadium	Score	Win	Loss	Save	Attend	Overall Record	Tourney Record	Sources
May 25	7:30 p.m.	ESPN+	vs. (6) West Virginia	(3) No. 22	Globe Life Field; Arlington, TX	**W** 6–4	**Campbell** (3–0)	Watters (3–7)	–	5,528	34–20	1–0	
May 26	7:30 p.m.	ESPNU	vs. (2) No. 8 Texas Tech	(3) No. 22	Globe Life Field; Arlington, TX	**W** 6–3	**Bennett** (7–3)	Morris (7–2)	–	6,288	35–20	2–0	
May 26	12:30 p.m.	ESPN+	vs. (7) Kansas State	(3) No. 22	Globe Life Field; Arlington, TX	**W** 4–3	**Sandlin** (7–3)	Hassall (4–7)	**Michael** (9)	–	36–20	3–0	
May 26	5:00 p.m.	ESPNU	vs. (5) No. 19 Texas	(3) No. 22	Globe Life Field; Arlington, TX	**W** 8–1	**Horton** (3–2)	Sthele (3–1)	–	10,308	37–20	4–0	

Gainesville Regional (3–1)
Date	Time (CT)	TV	Opponent	Seed	Stadium	Score	Win	Loss	Save	Attend	Overall Record	Tourney Record	Sources
June 3	12:00 p.m.	ESPN+	vs. (3) Liberty	(2) No. 9	Condron Ballpark; Gainesville, FL	**W** 16–3	**Bennett** (8–3)	Cummings (5–5)	–	2,824	38–20	1–0	
June 4	6:00 p.m.	ESPNU	vs. (1) No. 18 Florida	(2) No. 9	Condron Ballpark; Gainesville, FL	**W** 9–4	**Sandlin** (8–3)	Neely (3–3)	–	5,000	39–20	2–0	
June 5	6:00 p.m.	ESPN+	vs. (1) No. 18 Florida	(2) No. 9	Condron Ballpark; Gainesville, FL	**L** 2–7	Finnvold (2–1)	Atwood (2–4)	–	3,439	39–21	2–1	
June 6	12:00 p.m.	ESPN+	vs. (1) No. 18 Florida	(2) No. 9	Condron Ballpark; Gainesville, FL	**W** 5–4	**Martinez** (4–3)	Slater (6–4)	**Bennett** (1)	3,933	40–21	3–1	

Blacksburg Super Regional (2–1)
Date	Time (CT)	TV	Opponent	Seed	Stadium	Score	Win	Loss	Save	Attend	Overall Record	Tourney Record	Sources
June 10	2:00 p.m.	ESPN2	vs (4) No. 4 Virginia Tech	No. 9	English Field; Blacksburg, VA	**W** 5–4	**Bennett** (9–3)	Griffin (7–2)	**Michael** (10)	2,837	41–21	1–0	
June 11	11:00 a.m.	ESPNU	vs (4) No. 4 Virginia Tech	No. 9	English Field; Blacksburg, VA	**L** 8–14	Hurney (6–1)	**Sandlin** (8–4)	–	2,813	41–22	1–1	
June 12	12:00 p.m.	ESPNU	vs (4) No. 4 Virginia Tech	No. 9	English Field; Blacksburg, VA	**W** 11–2	**Horton** (4–2)	Geber (1–2)	–	2,968	42–22	2–1	

College World Series (3–2)
Date	Time (CT)	TV	Opponent	Seed	Stadium	Score	Win	Loss	Save	Attend	Overall Record	Tourney Record	Sources
June 17	1:00 p.m	ESPN	vs (5) No. 5 Texas A&M	No. 9	Charles Schwab Field Omaha; Omaha, NE	**W** 13–8	**Bennett** (10–3)	Dettmer (5–3)	–	23,886	43–22	1–0	
June 19	6:00 p.m	ESPN2	vs Notre Dame	No. 9	Charles Schwab Field	**W** 6–2	**Horton** (5–2)	Tyrell (5–2)	–	24,934	44–22	2–0	
June 22	1:00 p.m	ESPN	vs (5) No. 5 Texas A&M	No. 9	Charles Schwab Field	**W** 5–1	**Sandlin** (9–4)	Prager (1–4)	–	23,827	45–22	3–0	
June 25	6:00 p.m	ESPN	vs Ole Miss	No. 9	Charles Schwab Field	**L** 3–10	Dougherty (4–3)	**Bennett** (10–4)	–	25,813	45–23	3–1	
June 26	2:00 p.m	ESPN	vs Ole Miss	No. 9	Charles Schwab Field	**L** 2–4	Gaddis (4–2)	Michael (4–2)	Johnson (12)	25,972	45–24	3–2	

* indicates a non-conference game. All rankings from D1Baseball on the date of the contest.

== Rankings ==
Ranking movements Legend: ██ Increase in ranking ██ Decrease in ranking — = Not ranked RV = Received votes
	Week																		
Poll	Pre	1	2	3	4	5	6	7	8	9	10	11	12	13	14	15	16	17	Final
Coaches'	—	—*	RV	—	—	—	—	—	—	—	RV	RV	RV	24					
Baseball America	—	—	—	—	—	—	—	—	—	—	—	—	—	24					
Collegiate Baseball^	45	—	—	—	—	—	—	—	—	—	—	—	—	—					
NCBWA†	RV	RV	RV	RV	RV	RV	—	RV	—	RV	RV	—	—	—					
D1Baseball	—	—	—	—	—	—	—	—	—	—	—	—	—	—					

^ Collegiate Baseball ranked 40 teams in their preseason poll, but only ranked 30 teams weekly during the season.
† NCBWA ranks 30 teams in their preseason poll, but only ranks 25 teams weekly during the season.
* A new poll was not released for this week, so for comparison purposes, the previous week's ranking is inserted in this week's slot.
