= 2022 Texas Tech Red Raiders baseball team =

College Baseball Season

2022 Texas Tech Red Raiders baseball

Statesboro Regional, 2–2
- Conference: Big 12 Conference

Ranking
- Coaches: No. 25
- CB: No. 22
- Record: 39–22 (15–9 Big 12)
- Head coach: Tim Tadlock (10th season)
- Assistant coaches: J-Bob Thomas (10th season); Matt Gardner (10th season); Eric Gutierrez (4th season)
- Pitching coach: Ray Hayward (10th season)
- Home stadium: Dan Law Field at Rip Griffin Park

2022 Big 12 Conference baseball standings
	Conf.				Overall
Team	W		L	PCT	W		L	PCT
No. 23 TCU ‍†‍‍^{y}	16	–	8	.667	38	–	22	.633
Oklahoma State ‍‍‍^{y}	15	–	9	.625	42	–	22	.656
No. 2 Oklahoma ‍‍‡‍^{y}	15	–	9	.625	45	–	24	.652
No. 24 Texas Tech ‍‍‍^{y}	15	–	9	.625	39	–	22	.639
No. 8 Texas ‍‍‍^{y}	14	–	10	.583	47	–	22	.681
West Virginia ‍‍‍	14	–	10	.583	33	–	22	.600
Kansas State ‍‍‍	8	–	16	.333	29	–	29	.500
Baylor ‍‍‍	7	–	17	.292	26	–	28	.481
Kansas ‍‍‍	4	–	20	.167	20	–	35	.364
† – Conference champion ‡ – Tournament champion y – Invited to the NCAA tournament Rankings from D1baseball

The 2022 Texas Tech Red Raiders baseball team represented Texas Tech University during the 2022 NCAA Division I baseball season. The Red Raiders played their home games at Dan Law Field at Rip Griffin Park and competed as members of the Big 12 Conference. They were led by tenth-year head coach Tim Tadlock.

== Previous season ==
The 2021 team finished the regular season with a record of 35–13, 14–10 in Big 12 play, finishing in third place in the conference. The team went 1–2 in the Big 12 tournament, defeating Baylor in game one, but lost to eventual tournament winner TCU in game two and lost to Kansas State in the elimination game. In the NCAA tournament, the team hosted the Lubbock Regional, winning the regional 3–0. The team advanced to the Lubbock Super Regional, being swept by Stanford, finishing the season with an overall record of 39–17.

=== Players drafted into the MLB ===
Round	Pick	Player	Position	MLB Club
4	126	Cal Conley	SS	Atlanta Braves
4	130	Dru Baker	3B	Tampa Bay Rays
6	170	Braxton Fulford	C	Colorado Rockies
6	191	Mason Montgomery	P	Tampa Bay Rays
7	222	Ryan Sublette	P	Los Angeles Dodgers
8	226	Hunter Dobbins	P	Boston Red Sox
8	239	Patrick Monteverde	P	Miami Marlins
11	339	Brandon Birdsell	P	Minnesota Twins
17	519	Dylan Neuse	2B	Minnesota Twins

== Personnel ==
=== Coaching staff ===
Name	Position	Seasons at Texas Tech	Alma mater
Tim Tadlock	Head coach	10	Texas Tech University (1992)
Matt Gardner	Assistant Coach	10	Oklahoma State University (2008)
J-Bob Thomas	Assistant Coach / Recruiting Coordinator	10	Abilene Christian University (2005)
Ray Hayward	Special Assistant / Pitching Coach	10	University of Oklahoma (1983)
Eric Gutierrez	Volunteer Assistant Coach	4	Texas Tech University (2016)

=== Roster ===
2022 Texas Tech Red Raiders Baseball Roster
Pitchers: 8 Kurt Wilson (RHP) – senior (6'1, 185); 11 Andrew Devine (RHP) – sophomore (5'10, 155); 16 Hayde Key (RHP) – sophomore (5'10, 185); 21 Mason Molina (LHP) – freshman (6'0, 230); 25 Owen Washburn (RHP) – freshman (6'0, 205); 28 Chase Hampton (RHP) – sophomore (6'2, 215); 29 Jamie Hitt (LHP) – (redshirt) freshman (6'0, 175); 30 Bo Blessie (RHP) – junior (6'3, 190); 31 Austin Becker (RHP) – (redshirt) sophomore (6'5, 190); 32 Trendan Parish (RHP) – freshman (6'0, 180); 34 Andrew Morris (RHP) – junior (6'0, 195); 35 Garrett Crowley (LHP) – junior (6'3, 220); 36 Shay Harris (RHP) – sophomore (6'1, 210); 37 Logan Whitfield (LHP) – freshman (6'0, 230); 38 Tyler Hamilton (RHP) – sophomore (6'1, 200); 39 Jase Lopez (RHP) – sophomore (5'10, 195); 40 Brendan Girton (RHP) – sophomore (6'1, 230); 42 Kyle Robinson (RHP) – freshman (6'4, 210); 43 Brendan Lysik (LHP) – freshman (6'3, 225); 44 Brandon Beckel (RHP) – sophomore (6'3, 205); 45 Derek Bridges (LHP) – sophomore (6'1, 205); 46 Coleson Abel (LHP) – freshman (5'8, 200); 48 Brandon Birdsell (RHP) – junior (6'2, 225); 49 Collin Clark (LHP) – senior (6'2, 205); 51 Brandon Petix (LHP) – junior (6'6, 225); 52 Josh Sanders (RHP) – sophomore (6'3, 165); 55 Brady LeJeune-DeAcutis (LHP) – sophomore (6'6, 180)	Catchers: 4 Kevin Bazzell – freshman (6'1, 205); 5 Hudson White – freshman (5'11, 195); 13 Trevor Conley – freshman (5'9, 185); 17 Drew Reynolds – freshman (5'11, 200); 18 Cole Stillwell – junior (6'1, 205); Infielders: 2 Jace Jung – sophomore (6'0, 200); 3 Lauden Brooks – freshman (5'10, 185); 5 Hudson White – freshman (5'11, 195); 9 Zac Vooletich – junior (5'9, 185); 10 Ty Coleman – junior (5'8, 190); 15 Parker Kelly – senior (6'3, 205); 17 Drew Reynolds – freshman (5'11, 200); 18 Cole Stillwell – junior (6'1, 205); 19 Easton Murrell – (redshirt) senior (6'0, 210); 26 Erick Martinez – (redshirt) freshman (5'7, 140); 33 Ryan Brome – freshman (5'11, 225); Outfielders: 1 Dillon Carter – sophomore (6'0, 210); 7 Cody Masters – senior (6'1, 180); 9 Zac Vooletich – junior (5'9, 185); 10 Ty Coleman – junior (5'8, 190); 14 Cooper Swanson – senior (6'0, 205); 19 Easton Murrell – (redshirt) senior (6'0, 210); 20 Dalton Porter – sophomore (5'11, 195); 25 Owen Washburn – freshman (6'0, 205); 33 Ryan Brome – freshman (5'11, 225); 41 Sam Hunt – (redshirt) freshman (6'0, 170)

== Schedule ==
2022 Texas Tech Red Raiders baseball game log: 39–22
Regular season: 36–18

February: 5–2
Date	Time	Opponent	Rank	Stadium	Score	Win	Loss	Save	Attendance	Overall	Big 12	Ref
February 18	7:00 p.m.	vs. Michigan*; State Farm College; Baseball Showdown	#14	Globe Life Field; Arlington, TX	**W** 7–6	**Hampton** (1–0)	Weiss (0–1)	—	7,112	1–0	—	
February 19	3:00 p.m.	vs. Auburn*; State Farm College; Baseball Showdown	#14	Globe Life Field; Arlington, TX	**L** 1–2	Gonzalez (1–0)	**Birdsell** (0–1)	Burkhalter (1)		1–1	—	
February 20	2:30 p.m.	vs. #15 Arizona*; State Farm College; Baseball Showdown	#14	Globe Life Field; Arlington, TX	**L** 2–12	Netz (1–0)	**Molina** (0–1)	—		1–2	—	
February 22	2:00 p.m.	Dallas Baptist*	#20	Dan Law Field; Lubbock, TX	**W** 8–4	**Girton** (1–0)	Rich (0–1)	**Parish** (1)	3,557	2–2	—	
February 25	6:30 p.m.	Kent State*	#20	Dan Law Field; Lubbock, TX	**Postponed to February 27**							
February 26	2:00 p.m.	Kent State*	#20	Dan Law Field; Lubbock, TX	**W** 10–7	**Girton** (2–0)	Cruikshank (0–2)	**Parish** (2)	3,684	3–2	—	
February 27	12:00 p.m.	Kent State*	#20	Dan Law Field; Lubbock, TX	**W** 8–1	**Birdsell** (1–1)	Romel (0–2)	—	3,779	4–2	—	
February 27	3:55 p.m.	Kent State*	#20	Dan Law Field; Lubbock, TX	**W** 7–5	**Lopez** (1–0)	Cariaco (0–1)	**Parish** (3)	3,779	5–2	—	

March: 17–3
Date	Time	Opponent	Rank	Stadium	Score	Win	Loss	Save	Attendance	Overall	Big 12	Ref
March 1	2:00 p.m.	at Dallas Baptist*	#19	Horner Ballpark; Dallas, TX	**W** 4–3 (10)	**Hartis** (1–0)	Trahan (0–2)	**Parish** (4)	1,235	6–2	—	
March 4	6:30 p.m.	Merrimack*	#19	Dan Law Field; Lubbock, TX	**W** 17–1	**Morris** (1–0)	Kalantzakos (1–1)	—	3,942	7–2	—	
March 5	12:00 p.m.	Merrimack*	#19	Dan Law Field; Lubbock, TX	**W** 21–5	**Birdsell** (2–1)	Zappulla (1–1)	—	4,031	8–2	—	
March 5	4:00 p.m.	Merrimack*	#19	Dan Law Field; Lubbock, TX	**W** 20–2	**Molina** (1–1)	Gillette (1–1)	—	4,031	9–2	—	
March 6	1:00 p.m.	Merrimack*	#19	Dan Law Field; Lubbock, TX	**W** 12–4	**Becker** (1–0)	Villella (0–2)	—	3,394	10–2	—	
March 8	6:00 p.m.	vs. #23 Mississippi State*	#17	MGM Park; Biloxi, MS	**L** 5–11	Stinnett (2–0)	**Hampton** (1–1)	Kohn (2)	5,799	10–3	—	
March 9	3:00 p.m.	vs. #23 Mississippi State*	#17	MGM Park; Biloxi, MS	**W** 7–2	**Hitt** (1–0)	Fristoe (1–2)	—	5,382	11–3	—	
March 11	7:00 p.m.	at Rice*	#17	Reckling Park; Houston, TX	**W** 10–1	**Morris** (2–0)	Chandler (0–4)	**Sanders** (1)	2,099	12–3	—	
March 12	2:00 p.m.	at Rice*	#17	Reckling Park; Houston, TX	**W** 3–2	**Parish** (1–0)	DeLeon (1–1)	—	2,579	13–3	—	
March 13	1:00 p.m.	at Rice*	#17	Reckling Park; Houston, TX	**W** 7–4	**Robinson** (1–0)	Gallant (0–1)	**Parish** (5)	2,547	14–3	—	
March 15	6:30 p.m.	New Mexico*	#17	Dan Law Field; Lubbock, TX	**W** 28–2	**Hampton** (2–1)	Reyes Jr. (1–3)	—	4,253	15–3	—	
March 16	1:00 p.m.	New Mexico*	#17	Dan Law Field; Lubbock, TX	**W** 11–5	**Girton** (3–0)	Loesch (1–1)	—	3,967	16–3	—	
March 18	4:05 p.m.	at Iowa*	#17	Duane Banks Field; Iowa City, IA	**Canceled**							
March 19	2:05 p.m.	at Iowa*	#17	Duane Banks Field; Iowa City, IA	**W** 11–3	**Birdsell** (3–1)	Mazur (2–1)	—	1,043	17–3	—	
March 20	12:05 p.m.	at Iowa*	#17	Duane Banks Field; Iowa City, IA	**L** 3–6	Nedved (1–1)	**Molina** (1–2)	—	1,290	17–4	—	
March 22	6:30 p.m.	California Baptist*	#16	Dan Law Field; Lubbock, TX	**W** 6–3	**Hampton** (3–1)	Silvas (2–2)	—	3,092	18–4	—	
March 25	6:30 p.m.	#2 Texas	#16	Dan Law Field; Lubbock, TX	**W** 5–4 (10)	**Sanders** (1–0)	Nixon (0–1)	—	4,432	19–4	1–0	
March 26	2:00 p.m.	#2 Texas	#16	Dan Law Field; Lubbock, TX	**W** 16–12 (10)	**Bridges** (1–0)	Nixon (0–2)	—	4,432	20–4	2–0	
March 27	2:00 p.m.	#2 Texas	#16	Dan Law Field; Lubbock, TX	**L** 1–12 (7)	Gordon (2–1)	**Molina** (1–3)	—	4,432	20–5	2–1	
March 29	6:30 p.m.	Stephen F. Austin*	#7	Dan Law Field; Lubbock, TX	**W** 19–1	**Devine** (1–0)	Kudelka (0–1)	—	3,500	21–5	—	
March 30	1:00 p.m.	Stephen F. Austin*	#7	Dan Law Field; Lubbock, TX	**W** 13–5	**Becker** (2–0)	Jaco (0–2)	—	3,502	22–5	—	

April: 9–10
Date	Time	Opponent	Rank	Stadium	Score	Win	Loss	Save	Attendance	Overall	Big 12	Ref
April 1	6:00 p.m.	at Kansas	#7	Hoglund Ballpark; Lawrence, KS	**W** 8–2	**Morris** (3–0)	Hegarty (2–3)	—	1,117	23–5	3–1	
April 2	2:00 p.m.	at Kansas	#7	Hoglund Ballpark; Lawrence, KS	**W** 28–2	**Birdsell** (4–1)	Larsen (0–5)	—	1,174	24–5	4–1	
April 3	1:00 p.m.	at Kansas	#7	Hoglund Ballpark; Lawrence, KS	**L** 5–8	Vanderhei (4–2)	**Molina** (1–4)	Hewlett (1)	694	24–6	4–2	
April 5	6:00 p.m.	at Grand Canyon*	#4	Brazell Field; Phoenix, AZ	**L** 4–9	Reilly (1–1)	**Hampton** (3–2)	—	1,618	24–7	—	
April 6	2:00 p.m.	at Grand Canyon*	#4	Brazell Field; Phoenix, AZ	**L** 7–8	Omlid (1–0)	**Devine** (1–1)	Reilly (7)	982	24–8	—	
April 8	6:30 p.m.	Kansas State	#4	Dan Law Field; Lubbock, TX	**W** 6–3	**Morris** (4–0)	Adams (3–3)	**Parish** (6)	4,432	25–8	5–2	
April 9	2:00 p.m.	Kansas State	#4	Dan Law Field; Lubbock, TX	**W** 14–0	**Birdsell** (5–1)	Corsentino (2–3)	**Clark** (1)	4,432	26–8	6–2	
April 10	1:00 p.m.	Kansas State	#4	Dan Law Field; Lubbock, TX	**W** 7–6	**Parish** (2–0)	Adams (3–4)	—	3,955	27–8	7–2	
April 12	6:00 p.m.	vs. Oklahoma*	#4	Hodgetown; Amarillo, TX	**L** 9–14	Carmichael (3–0)	**Becker** (2–1)	—	7,239	27–9	—	
April 14	6:00 p.m.	at TCU	#4	Lupton Stadium; Fort Worth, TX	**L** 4–7	Mihlbauer (1–0)	**Clark** (0–1)	Savage (1)	5,475	27–10	7–3	
April 15	6:00 p.m.	at TCU	#4	Lupton Stadium; Fort Worth, TX	**L** 3–4	Perez (3–1)	**Birdsell** (5–2)	Ridings (10)	6,280	27–11	7–4	
April 16	2:00 p.m.	at TCU	#4	Lupton Stadium; Fort Worth, TX	**L** 3–11	Walker (4–2)	**Hampton** (3–3)	—	5,706	27–12	7–5	
April 19	6:30 p.m.	at New Mexico*	#9	Santa Ana Star Field; Albuquerque, NM	**L** 10–11	Egloff (5–4)	**Parish** (2–1)	—	551	27–13	—	
April 22	6:30 p.m.	West Virginia	#9	Dan Law Field; Lubbock, TX	**Postponed to April 23**							
April 23	1:00 p.m.	West Virginia	#9	Dan Law Field; Lubbock, TX	**W** 7–5	**Morris** (5–0)	Watters (2–3)	—	4,432	28–13	8–5	
April 23	4:15 p.m.	West Virginia	#9	Dan Law Field; Lubbock, TX	**W** 12–2 (8)	**Birdsell** (6–2)	Hampton (6–3)	—	4,432	29–13	9–5	
April 24	1:00 p.m.	West Virginia	#9	Dan Law Field; Lubbock, TX	**L** 4–15	Smith (1–1)	**Molina** (1–5)	Braithwaite (5)	3,973	29–14	9–6	
April 26	6:30 p.m.	Abilene Christian*	#9	Dan Law Field; Lubbock, TX	**L** 5–8	Sells (3–1)	**Hitt** (1–1)	Huffling (1)	4,432	29–15	—	
April 29	6:30 p.m.	at Baylor	#9	Baylor Ballpark; Waco, TX	**W** 7–1	**Morris** (6–0)	Jackson (3–4)	—	2,217	30–15	10–6	
April 30	2:00 p.m.	at Baylor	#9	Baylor Ballpark; Waco, TX	**W** 11–1	**Birdsell** (7–2)	Andrade (3–3)	—	2,815	31–15	11–6	

May: 5–3
Date	Time	Opponent	Rank	Site/stadium	Score	Win	Loss	Save	Attendance	Overall	Big 12	Ref
May 1	1:00 p.m.	at Baylor	#9	Baylor Ballpark; Waco, TX	**L** 7–11	Voelker (4–5)	**Parish** (2–2)	—	2,073	31–16	11–7	
May 3	6:05 p.m.	at Abilene Christian*	#9	Crutcher Scott Field; Abilene, TX	**W** 16–12	**Devine** (2–1)	Carlton (1–1)	—	4,087	32–16	—	
May 13	6:00 p.m.	at #3 Oklahoma State	#9	O'Brate Stadium; Stillwater, OK	**W** 7–6	**Morris** (7–0)	Campbell (7–2)	**Devine** (1)	5,507	33–16	12–7	
May 14	6:00 p.m.	at #3 Oklahoma State	#9	O'Brate Stadium; Stillwater, OK	**W** 9–3	**Birdsell** (8–2)	Osmond (4–2)	—	6,077	34–16	13–7	
May 15	1:00 p.m.	at #3 Oklahoma State	#9	O'Brate Stadium; Stillwater, OK	**W** 6–4	**Hampton** (4–3)	Martin (3–3)	**Becker** (1)	5,372	35–16	14–7	
May 19	6:30 p.m.	Oklahoma	#5	Dan Law Field; Lubbock, TX	**L** 8–13	Bennett (6–3)	**Morris** (7–1)	—	3,829	35–17	14–8	
May 20	6:30 p.m.	Oklahoma	#5	Dan Law Field; Lubbock, TX	**L** 6–9	Sandlin (6–3)	**Birdsell** (8–3)	Michael (8)	4,432	35–18	14–9	
May 21	2:00 p.m.	Oklahoma	#5	Dan Law Field; Lubbock, TX	**W** 10–2	**Hampton** (5–3)	Horton (2–2)	—	4,432	36–18	15–9	

Post–season: 3–4

Big 12 Tournament: 1–2
Date	Time	Opponent	Rank	Stadium	Score	Win	Loss	Save	Attendance	Overall	B12T	Ref
May 25	4:00 p.m.	vs. (7) Kansas State	#8 (2)	Globe Life Field; Arlington, TX	**W** 5–3	**Molina** (2–5)	McCullough (3–4)	**Becker** (2)		37–18	1–0	
May 26	8:00 p.m.	vs. #22 (3) Oklahoma	#8 (2)	Globe Life Field; Arlington, TX	**L** 3–6	Bennett (7–3)	**Morris** (7–2)	—	6,288	37–19	1–1	
May 27	7:00 p.m.	vs. (7) Kansas State	#8 (2)	Globe Life Field; Arlington, TX	**L** 5–6 (11)	Ruhl (5–2)	**Beckel** (0–1)	Phillips (8)	7,178	37–20	1–2	

NCAA tournament: 2–2
Date	Time	Opponent	Rank	Site/stadium	Score	Win	Loss	Save	Attendance	Overall	NCAAT	Ref
June 3	1:00 p.m.	#17 (2) Notre Dame; Statesboro Regional	#24 (3)	J. I. Clements Stadium; Statesboro, GA	**L** 2–3	Mercer (2–1)	**Hampton** (5–4)	Tyrell (2)	827	37–21	0–1	
June 4	12:20 p.m.	(4) UNC Greensboro; Statesboro Regional	#24 (3)	J. I. Clements Stadium; Statesobro, GA	**W** 2–0	**Birdsell** (9–3)	Mathewson (5–7)	**Bridges** (1)	622	38–21	1–1	
June 5	1:00 p.m.	#21 (1) Georgia Southern; Statesboro Regional	#24 (3)	J. I. Clements Stadium; Statesboro, GA	**W** 3–1	**Morris** (8–2)	Madden (2–2)	**Molina** (1)	2,107	39–21	2–1	
June 5	6:00 p.m.	#17 (2) Notre Dame; Statesboro Regional	#24 (3)	J. I. Clements Stadium; Statesboro, GA	**L** 1–2	Bertrand (9–2)	**Hitt** (1–2)	Findlay (2)	784	39–22	2–2	

Legend: = Win = Loss = Canceled
Bold = Texas Tech team member

"*" indicates a non-conference game.
"#" represents ranking. All rankings from D1Baseball on the date of the contest.
"()" represents postseason seeding in the Big 12 Tournament and NCAA Regional, respectively.

== Rankings ==
Ranking movements Legend: ██ Increase in ranking ██ Decrease in ranking — = Not ranked
	Week																		
Poll	Pre	1	2	3	4	5	6	7	8	9	10	11	12	13	14	15	16	17	Final
Coaches'	12	12*	18	11	13	11	6	4	4	8	13	12	13	7	11	15	15*	15*	25
Baseball America	23	—	—	—	23	23	7	5	4	17	15	17	15	6	12	22	22*	22*	25
Collegiate Baseball^	4	16	23	19	17	16	6	5	8	—	—	—	30	12	14	15	22	22	22
NCBWA†	14	21	21	15	12	11	6	4	5	9	9	9	9	6	9	11	24	24*	23
D1Baseball	14	20	19	17	17	16	7	4	4	9	9	9	9	5	8	24	24*	24*	24

^ Collegiate Baseball ranked 40 teams in their preseason poll, but only ranked 30 teams weekly during the season.
† NCBWA ranks 30 teams in their preseason poll, but only ranks 25 teams weekly during the season.
* A new poll was not released for this week, so for comparison purposes, the previous week's ranking is inserted in this week's slot.

== Players drafted into the MLB ==
Round	Pick	Player	Position	MLB Club
1	12	Jace Jung	2B	Detroit Tigers
4	114	Andrew Morris	P	Minnesota Twins
5	143	Brandon Birdsell	P	Chicago Cubs
6	190	Chase Hampton	P	New York Yankees
