= 2022 Big 12 Conference baseball tournament =

American college baseball tournament

- Teams: 8
- Format: Double-elimination tournament
- Finals site: Globe Life Field; Arlington, Texas
- Champions: Oklahoma (3rd title)
- Television: Bracket Play: ESPN+, ESPNU; Championship: ESPNU

2022 Big 12 Conference baseball standings
	Conf.				Overall
Team	W		L	PCT	W		L	PCT
No. 23 TCU ‍†‍‍^{y}	16	–	8	.667	38	–	22	.633
Oklahoma State ‍‍‍^{y}	15	–	9	.625	42	–	22	.656
No. 2 Oklahoma ‍‍‡‍^{y}	15	–	9	.625	45	–	24	.652
No. 24 Texas Tech ‍‍‍^{y}	15	–	9	.625	39	–	22	.639
No. 8 Texas ‍‍‍^{y}	14	–	10	.583	47	–	22	.681
West Virginia ‍‍‍	14	–	10	.583	33	–	22	.600
Kansas State ‍‍‍	8	–	16	.333	29	–	29	.500
Baylor ‍‍‍	7	–	17	.292	26	–	28	.481
Kansas ‍‍‍	4	–	20	.167	20	–	35	.364
† – Conference champion ‡ – Tournament champion y – Invited to the NCAA tournament Rankings from D1baseball

The 2022 Big 12 Conference baseball tournament was held from May 25 through 29 at Globe Life Field in Arlington, Texas. The annual tournament determines the conference champion of the Division I Big 12 Conference for college baseball. The winner of the tournament will earn the league's automatic bid to the 2022 NCAA Division I baseball tournament.

The tournament has been held since 1997, the inaugural year of the Big 12 Conference. Among current league members, Texas has won the most championships with five. Among original members, Kansas State has never won the event. Oklahoma State won their third championship in 2019. Iowa State discontinued their program after the 2001 season without having won a title. Having joined in 2013, TCU won titles in 2014, 2016, and 2021, while West Virginia has yet to win the Tournament.

== Format and seeding ==
The top eight finishers from the regular season will be seeded one through eight, and will then play a two-bracket double-elimination tournament leading to a winner-take-all championship game. At the beginning of the season, the conference coaches voted to make the higher seeded team the designated home team for all games in the tournament.

== Bracket ==
First round May 25
1	TCU	4
8	Baylor	2
4	Oklahoma State	0
5	Texas	4
8	Baylor	1
4	Oklahoma State	11^{7}
3	Oklahoma	6
6	West Virginia	4
2	Texas Tech	5
7	Kansas State	3
6	West Virginia	5
7	Kansas State	8

Second round May 26–May 27
1	TCU	3
5	Texas	5
1	TCU	4
4	Oklahoma State	8
3	Oklahoma	6
2	Texas Tech	3
2	Texas Tech	5
7	Kansas State	6^{11}

Semifinals; May 28
5	Texas	1	9
4	Oklahoma State	8	2
3	Oklahoma	4	-
7	Kansas State	3	-

Finals; May 29
5	Texas	1
3	Oklahoma	8

== Schedule ==
Game	Time*	Matchup^{#}	Score	Television
Wednesday, May 25
1	9:00am	No. 4 Oklahoma State vs No. 5 Texas	0-4	ESPNU
2	12:30pm	No. 1 TCU vs No. 8 Baylor	4-2	ESPN+
3	4:00pm	No. 2 Texas Tech vs No. 7 Kansas State	5-3	ESPN+
4	7:30pm	No. 3 Oklahoma vs No. 6 West Virginia	6-4	ESPN+
Thursday, May 26
5	9:00am	No. 4 Oklahoma State vs No. 8 Baylor	11-1^{7}	ESPN+
6	12:30pm	No. 6 West Virginia vs No. 7 Kansas State	5–8	ESPN+
7	4:00pm	No. 1 TCU vs No. 5 Texas	3-5	ESPNU
8	7:30pm	No. 2 Texas Tech vs No. 3 Oklahoma	3-6	ESPNU
Friday, May 27
9	3:15pm	No. 1 TCU vs No. 4 Oklahoma State	4-8	ESPN+
10	7:00pm	No. 2 Texas Tech vs No. 7 Kansas State	5-6^{11}	ESPN+
Semifinals – Saturday, May 28
11	9:00am	No. 4 Oklahoma State vs No. 5 Texas	8-1	ESPN+
12	12:30pm	No. 3 Oklahoma vs No. 7 Kansas State	4-3	ESPN+
13	4:00pm	No. 4 Oklahoma State vs No. 5 Texas	2-9	ESPN+
Championship – Sunday, May 29
14	5:00pm	No. 3 Oklahoma vs No. 5 Texas	8-1	ESPNU
*Game times in CDT. # – Rankings denote tournament seed.

== Conference Championship Game ==
Big 12 Championship
(5)Texas Longhorns	vs.	(3)Oklahoma Sooners

May 29, 2022 5 p.m. (CDT) at Globe Life Field in Arlington, Texas
Team	1	2	3	4	5	6	7	8	9	R	H	E
Texas	1	0	0	0	0	0	0	0	0	1	4	0
Oklahoma	0	0	8	0	0	0	0	0	x	8	8	0
WP: C.Horton(3–2) LP: T.Sthele(3–1); Home runs: TEX: I.Melendez; OKLA: J.Crooks
