= Coaker Triplett =

American baseball player (1911–1992)

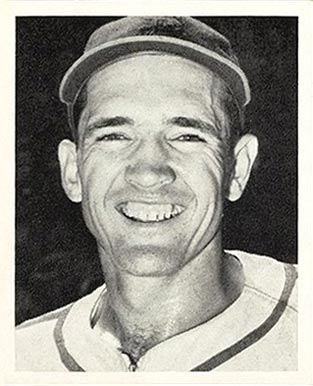
- Triplett in 1941
- Left fielder
- Born: December 18, 1911; Boone, North Carolina, U.S.
- Died: January 30, 1992 (aged 80); Boone, North Carolina, U.S.
- Batted: Right Threw: Right

MLB debut
- April 19, 1938, for the Chicago Cubs

Last MLB appearance
- September 30, 1945, for the Philadelphia Phillies

MLB statistics
- Batting average: .256
- Home runs: 27
- Runs batted in: 173
- Stats at Baseball Reference

Teams
- Chicago Cubs (1938); St. Louis Cardinals (1941–1943); Philadelphia Phillies (1943–1945)

Career highlights and awards
- World Series champion (1942)

Herman Coaker Triplett (December 18, 1911 – January 30, 1992) was an American professional baseball player. In Major League Baseball, he was a backup outfielder, playing mainly as a left fielder for three different teams between the 1938 and 1945 seasons. Listed at 5 ft 11 in (1.80 m), 185 pounds (84 kg), Triplett batted and threw right-handed. He was born in Boone, North Carolina.

In his college years at Appalachian State, Triplett was a high-scoring football halfback and baseball team captain.

Basically a line-drive hitter and a good fielding replacement, Triplett was one of many players who mostly only appeared in the majors during World War II. He debuted with the Chicago Cubs, playing for them briefly during the 1938 season before joining the St. Louis Cardinals (1941–1943) and Philadelphia Phillies (1943–1945). His most productive season came in 1943, when he hit a collective .260 batting average with 56 runs batted in in 114 games, ending fourth in the National League with 15 home runs and fifth with a .439 slugging percentage.

In a six-season career, Triplett was a .256 hitter (334-for-1307) with 27 home runs and 173 RBI in 470 games, including 148 runs, 47 doubles, 14 triples, 10 stolen bases, and a .320 on-base percentage. Defensively, he recorded a .965 fielding percentage.

Triplett resumed his baseball career with the Buffalo Bisons of the International League, hitting .306 in 1946, .315 in 1947, and .353 in 1948 to win the league batting title. He added 22 home runs in 1949 and a .337 average in 1950. The next year, he replaced Specs Toporcer as Buffalo's manager during the midseason, as Toporcer's eyesight had declined.

In 1976, Triplett gained induction into the Appalachian State Hall of Fame. He also is a member of the Buffalo Baseball Hall of Fame and Watauga Sports Hall of Fame. The International League Hall of Fame inducted him in 2010.

Triplett died at Glenstone Health Care Center in Boone on January 30, 1992 at age 80.
