= Jamestown Community College =

Public college in Jamestown, New York, US

- Motto: Come as you are. Leave as you want to be.
- Type: Public community college
- Established: 1950; 76 years ago
- Parent institution: State University of New York
- President: Daniel DeMarte
- Students: 3,952 (fall 2025)
- Location: Jamestown, New York, U.S. 42.1132°N 78.4299°W
- Campus: Suburban
- Colors: Green & gold
- Nickname: Jayhawks
- Sporting affiliations: NJCAA – WNYAC
- Mascot: JJ the Jayhawk
- Website: www.sunyjcc.edu

Jamestown Community College is a public community college with campuses in Jamestown and Olean, New York. It is part of the State University of New York system. JCC also has extension centers in Dunkirk, New York and Warren, Pennsylvania. The college offers more than 60 degree and certificate programs.

Founded in 1950, Jamestown Community College was the first locally sponsored community college in the State University of New York system. The college has grown from an enrollment of 169 students attending classes held at Jamestown High School to an enrollment of 2,484 in 2019–20 among its sites.

JCC is accredited by the Middle States Commission on Higher Education. Its curricula are approved by the State University of New York and are registered by the New York State Department of Education. JCC's nursing program is accredited by the Accreditation Commission for Education in Nursing, Inc. JCC's occupational therapy assistant program is accredited by the Accreditation Council for Occupational Therapy Education of the American Occupational Therapy Association.

== History ==
Founded in 1950 as a predominantly transfer, liberal arts oriented institution, JCC was among the first community colleges within the State University of New York.

JCC has remained committed to the humanities and liberal arts while expanding to meet the social imperatives of workforce development and community service. The college serves students desiring transfer programs, provides technical and career programs for those seeking employment immediately after graduation, and offers the community workplace and personal enrichment programs.

== Student life ==
Student clubs and organizations that focus on a variety of interests provide opportunities for creative expression, community service, and cultural diversity. Students are also able to engage in campus life programs, intercollegiate athletics, and intramural activities to develop social connections.

The Jamestown Campus provides on-campus living for 340 students in three residence halls.

=== Student government ===
The officially recognized student governing body is the Student Senate. Students have a direct voice in all student affairs and many college activities through active participation in student government.

=== Campus Activity Board ===
The Campus Activity Board (CAB) and the College Program Committee are the two organizations that are responsible for bringing activities (speakers, artists, musicians, etc.) to campus. CAB is composed of only students. The College Program Committee includes faculty, staff and student representatives.

=== Athletics ===
JCC is a member of the Western New York Athletic Conference and Region III of the National Junior College Athletic Association. The Jayhawk is the team mascot. Intercollegiate teams include:

- Men's baseball
- Men's and women's basketball
- Men's and women's cross country
- Men's and women's golf
- Men's and women's soccer
- Men's and women's swimming/diving
- Women's volleyball
- Men's wrestling

=== The arts at JCC ===
Weeks Gallery The Weeks Gallery, located on the Jamestown Campus, and the Center Gallery on the Cattaraugus County Campus present significant visual, performing, and interdisciplinary art programs. In 2011, the Weeks Gallery received two significant donations – Ken and Lois Strickler donated Andy Warhol’s Marilyn Monroe serigraph and Larry Diggs donated a small-untitled bronze by Louise Nevelson.

Scharmann Theatre Located on the Jamestown Campus, the Scharmann Theatre hosts several cultural events and programs. It's also home to the JCC Uncommoners, a student theatre group that presents at least two productions per academic year. The theatre is named for Robert Lee Scharmann, who taught English and drama at JCC from 1956 until his death in 1976.

Museum Without Walls Hallways and open spaces at each of JCC's sites feature works from the college's permanent art collection.

== On-campus housing ==
JCC provides on-campus living for 340 students in its three Hillside Suites residence halls. The halls offer students suite-style living, including four to five fully furnished bedrooms, a living room, kitchen, dining area, and two full bathrooms. The suites contain primarily single bedrooms, with a limited amount of double bedrooms available. All buildings are alcohol- and tobacco-free. Meal plans are available for residence hall students at the college's café.

== Notable alumni ==
- Jorn Barger, blogger
- Rob Buck, guitarist and founding member of 10,000 Maniacs
- Shawn Dubin, pitcher for the Houston Astros
- Adam Forde, basketball coach
- Bryan Hodgson, head coach of Arkansas State Red Wolves
- Matt Mazurek, head coach of Canisius Golden Griffins
- Gail Mellow, former president of LaGuardia Community College
- Natalie Merchant, singer and former member of 10,000 Maniacs
- Randy Merrill, sound engineer
- William Parment, former New York State Assemblyman
- Samuel Teresi, former mayor of Jamestown
- John A. Wright, Tulsa County assessor
