= Don Colpoys =

Biographical details
- Born: June 19, 1934; Buffalo, New York, U.S.
- Died: March 29, 2018 (aged 83); Buffalo, New York, U.S.

Coaching career (HC unless noted)
- 1977–2001: Canisius

Administrative career (AD unless noted)
- 1979–1984: Buffalo Bisons (General Manager)

Head coaching record
- Overall: 325–489–2

Accomplishments and honors

Awards
- Buffalo Baseball Hall of Fame (2007); Greater Buffalo Sports Hall of Fame (2011); Canisius College Sports Hall of Fame (2012)

Donald W. Colpoys (June 19, 1934 – March 29, 2018) was an American baseball coach and executive. Colpoys was the head baseball coach at Canisius College from 1977 to 2001, compiling an overall record of 325–489–2. He also served as general manager of the Buffalo Bisons from 1979 to 1984. Colpoys was elected to the Buffalo Baseball Hall of Fame in 2007, the Greater Buffalo Sports Hall of Fame in 2011, and the Canisius College Sports Hall of Fame in 2012. Colpoys died on March 29, 2018, at the age of 83.

== Head coaching record ==
Record table
Season	Team	Overall	Conference	Standing	Postseason
Canisius Golden Griffins (Independent) (1977–1989)
1977	Canisius	7–19			
1978	Canisius	10–12			
1979	Canisius	8–20			
1980	Canisius	7–23			
1981	Canisius	9–14			
1982	Canisius	14–15			
1983	Canisius	12–11			
1984	Canisius	14–10			
1985	Canisius	15–13			
1986	Canisius	18–6			
1987	Canisius	11–12			
1988	Canisius	11–17			
1989	Canisius	12–23			
Canisius Golden Griffins (Metro Atlantic Athletic Conference) (1990–2001)
1990	Canisius	11–20–1	6–6	2nd (Northern)	
1991	Canisius	13–33	6–11	3rd (Northern)	
1992	Canisius	13–22	8–10	2nd (Northern)	
1993	Canisius	13–25–1	7–11	t-2nd (Northern)	
1994	Canisius	28–14	17–1	1st (Northern)	MAAC Tournament
1995	Canisius	21–20	7–11	3rd (Northern)	
1996	Canisius	13–22	5–13	4th (Northern)	
1997	Canisius	18–19	5–13	4th (Northern)	
1998	Canisius	11–32	7–19	5th (Northern)	
1999	Canisius	13–26	8–18	5th (Northern)	
2000	Canisius	9–33	4–23	10th	
2001	Canisius	14–28	10–17	8th	
Canisius:		325–489–2	90–153		
Total:		325–489–2			
National champion Postseason invitational champion Conference regular season champion Conference regular season and conference tournament champion Division regular season champion Division regular season and conference tournament champion Conference tournament champion
