= 2022 Oklahoma State Cowboys baseball team =

College Baseball Season

2022 Oklahoma State Cowboys baseball

NCAA Stillwater Regional, 3–2
- Conference: Big 12 Conference

Ranking
- Coaches: No. 5
- CB: No. 14
- Record: 42–22 (15–9 Big 12)
- Head coach: Josh Holliday (10th season)
- Assistant coaches: Rob Walton (10th season); Matt Holliday (3rd season); Justin Seely (5th season)
- Home stadium: O'Brate Stadium

2022 Big 12 Conference baseball standings
	Conf.				Overall
Team	W		L	PCT	W		L	PCT
No. 23 TCU ‍†‍‍^{y}	16	–	8	.667	38	–	22	.633
Oklahoma State ‍‍‍^{y}	15	–	9	.625	42	–	22	.656
No. 2 Oklahoma ‍‍‡‍^{y}	15	–	9	.625	45	–	24	.652
No. 24 Texas Tech ‍‍‍^{y}	15	–	9	.625	39	–	22	.639
No. 8 Texas ‍‍‍^{y}	14	–	10	.583	47	–	22	.681
West Virginia ‍‍‍	14	–	10	.583	33	–	22	.600
Kansas State ‍‍‍	8	–	16	.333	29	–	29	.500
Baylor ‍‍‍	7	–	17	.292	26	–	28	.481
Kansas ‍‍‍	4	–	20	.167	20	–	35	.364
† – Conference champion ‡ – Tournament champion y – Invited to the NCAA tournament Rankings from D1baseball

The 2022 Oklahoma State Cowboys baseball team represented Oklahoma State University during the 2022 NCAA Division I baseball season. The Cowboys played their home games at O'Brate Stadium as a member of the Big 12 Conference. They were led by head coach Josh Holliday, in his tenth season at Oklahoma State.

== Previous season ==
The 2021 team finished the season with a 36–19–1 record and a 12–12 record in the Big 12. In the 2021 Big 12 Conference baseball tournament, the fourth-seeded Cowboys made a run to the finals where they fell to second-seeded TCU 7–10. They earned an at-large bid into the 2021 NCAA Division I baseball tournament, where they were seeded second in the Tucson Regional. There, the Cowboys were eliminated by third-seeded UC Santa Barbara.

== Player movement ==
=== Departures ===
To be announced

=== Transfers ===
Incoming transfers
Name	Number	Pos.	Height	Weight	Year	Hometown	Previous School
Lyle Miller-Green	10	INF/OF	6 ft 6 in (1.98 m)	229	So.	Burke, Virginia,	George Mason
Bayden Root	14	RHP	6 ft 2 in (1.88 m)	218	Jr.	Kokomo, Indiana	Ohio State
Brett Brown	15	INF/OF	6 ft 0 in (1.83 m)	190	Jr.	Godley, Texas,	Texas A&M
Victor Mederos	16	RHP	6 ft 2 in (1.88 m)	224	Fr.	Miami, Florida,	Miami (FL)
Jake Thompson	17	INF/OF	6 ft 0 in (1.83 m)	210	Gr.	Albert Lea, Minnesota,	South Dakota State
Jimmy Ramsey	23	RHP	6 ft 9 in (2.06 m)	265	Gr.	Minnetonka, Minnesota,	Kentucky
Roman Phansalkar	25	RHP	6 ft 1 in (1.85 m)	200	Jr.	Edmond, Oklahoma	Arizona
Solomon Washington	30	RHP	5 ft 11 in (1.80 m)	190	Jr.	Brentwood, Tennessee,	Tennessee Tech
David Mendham	31	1B/C	6 ft 1 in (1.85 m)	212	Jr.	Dorchester, Ontario	South Carolina
Chase Atkinson	33	C	6 ft 0 in (1.83 m)	195	Jr.	Grangeville, Idaho	Boise State
Dillon Marsh	34	LHP	6 ft 1 in (1.85 m)	222	Jr.	Elizabethtown, Pennsylvania	Kentucky
Cole Cosman	44	C	5 ft 11 in (1.80 m)	183	So.	Wentzville, Missouri	Hutchinson CC
Landry Kyle	45	RHP	6 ft 3 in (1.91 m)	202	So.	Edmond, Oklahoma	Seminole State (OK)
Griffin Doersching	52	1B	6 ft 4 in (1.93 m)	245	Gr.	Greendale, Wisconsin	Northern Kentucky

=== Signing day recruits ===
The following players signed National Letter of Intents to play for Oklahoma State in 2022.

Player	Hometown	Previous Team
Pitchers
Ryan Ure	Eaton, Colo.	Eaton HS
Carson Benge	Yukon, Okla.	Yukon HS
Drew Blake	Stillwater, Okla.	Stillwater HS
Bowen Bridges	Edmond, Okla.	Heritage Hall HS
Trevor Martin	Asher, Okla.	Asher HS
Hitters
Aidan Meola	Palm Beach Gardens, Fla.	Palm Beach Gardens HS
Zach Ehrhard	Tampa, Fla.	Wharton HS
Jaxson Crull	Bixby, Okla.	Bixby HS
Cayden Brumbaugh	Edmond, Okla.	Santa Fe HS
Roc Riggio	Simi Valley, Calif.	Thousand Oaks HS
Ian Daugherty	Kingfisher, Okla	Kingfisher HS
Nolan McLean	Willow Springs, NC	Garner HS
Marcus Brown	Springdale, Ark	Shiloh Christian HS

== Personnel ==
=== Coaching staff ===
2022 Oklahoma State Cowboys baseball coaching staff
Name	Position	Seasons at OK State	Alma mater
Josh Holliday	Head coach	10	Oklahoma State University (1999)
Rob Walton	Pitching Coach	10	Oklahoma State University (1986)
Justin Seely	Recruiting Coordinator	5	University of Nebraska–Lincoln (2002)
Matt Holliday	Hitting Coach	3	Stillwater High School (1998)
Victor Romero	Director of Operations	3	Oklahoma State University (2013)
Roland Fanning	Director of Player Development	5	Southeastern Oklahoma State University (2012)
Robin Ventura	Student Assistant	3	Oklahoma State University (1988)
Eli Williams	Athletic Trainer	11	University of Central Florida (2011)
Wes Ulm	Strength and Conditioning Coach	2	University of Cincinnati (2014)
Jon Littell	Graduate Assistant	1	Oklahoma State University (2018)
Colton Lovelance	Graduate Manager	1	University of Kansas (2020)

== Schedule and results ==
2022 Oklahoma State Cowboys baseball game log
Regular season (36–18)

February (4–2)
Date	Opponent	Rank	Site/stadium	Score	Win	Loss	Save	TV	Attendance	Overall record	B12 Record
February 18	at No. 3 Vanderbilt*	No. 7	Hawkins Field; Nashville, TN	**L** 0–3	McElvain (1–0)	**Campbell** **(0–1)**	Schultz (1)	SECN+	3,802	0–1	—
February 19	at No. 3 Vanderbilt*	No. 7	Hawkins Field; Nashville, TN	**W** 4–3	**Phansalkar** **(1–0)**	Maldonado (0–1)	**Martin** **(1)**	SECN+	3,802	1–1	—
February 20	at No. 3 Vanderbilt*	No. 7	Hawkins Field; Nashville, TN	**W** 7–5	**Martin** **(1–0)**	Schultz (0–1)	—	SECN+	3,802	2–1	—
February 22	vs. Sam Houston State*	No. 4	Globe Life Field; Arlington, TX	**L** 3–6	Lusk (1–0)	**Phansalkar** **(1–1)**	—	—	322	2–2	—
February 26	Wright State*	No. 4	O'Brate Stadium; Stillwater, OK	**Canceled due to weather conditions**							
February 27	Wright State*	No. 4	O'Brate Stadium; Stillwater, OK	**W** 26–3	**Campbell** **(1–1)**	Ernst (0–1)	—	ESPN+	5,364	3–2	—
February 27	Wright State*	No. 4	O'Brate Stadium; Stillwater, OK	**W** 7–6^{(10)}	**Ramsey** **(1–0)**	Haught (0–1)	—	ESPN+	5,364	4–2	—

March (14–5)
Date	Opponent	Rank	Site/stadium	Score	Win	Loss	Save	TV	Attendance	Overall record	B12 Record
March 1	at Arizona State*	No. 4	Phoenix Municipal Stadium; Phoenix, AZ	**W** 7–5	**Phansalkar** **(2–1)**	Webster (0–1)	**Martin** **(2)**	ESPN+	3,218	5–2	—
March 2	at Arizona State*	No. 4	Phoenix Municipal Stadium; Phoenix, AZ	**W** 11–6	**Root** **(1–0)**	Glenn (0–1)	—	ESPN+	3,072	6–2	—
March 4	Gonzaga*	No. 4	O'Brate Stadium; Stillwater, OK	**L** 3–4	Hughes (2–0)	**Davis** **(0–1)**	Spellacy (2)	—	5,649	6–3	—
March 5	Gonzaga*	No. 4	O'Brate Stadium; Stillwater, OK	**L** 1–2^{(10)}	Jessee (2–0)	**Phansalkar** **(2–2)**	—	—	5,587	6–4	—
March 7	No. 25 Gonzaga*	No. 6	O'Brate Stadium; Stillwater, OK	**L** 1–2	Vrieling (1–1)	**Osmond** **(0–1)**	Wild (1)	—	4,414	6–5	—
March 8	Missouri State*	No. 6	O'Brate Stadium; Stillwater, OK	**W** 5–1	**Marsh** **(1–0)**	Lang (0–1)	—	ESPN+	4,491	7–5	—
March 10	vs. BYU*	No. 6	Globe Life Field; Arlington, TX	**L** 6–8	Robison (2–0)	**Mederos** **(0–1)**	McLaughlin (5)	—	498	7–6	—
March 11	vs. BYU*	No. 6	Globe Life Field; Arlington, TX	**W** 3–0	**Davis** **(1–1)**	Reiser (1–1)	**Martin** **(3)**	—	705	8–6	—
March 12	vs. BYU*	No. 6	Globe Life Field; Arlington, TX	**W** 8–5	**Phansalkar** **(3–2)**	Dahle (0–3)	**Martin** **(4)**	—	1,062	9–6	—
March 16	Dallas Baptist*	No. 11	O'Brate Stadium; Stillwater, OK	**W** 5–4	**Root** **(2–0)**	Hall (1–1)	**Martin** **(5)**	ESPN+	5,535	10–6	—
March 17	Seton Hall*	No. 11	O'Brate Stadium; Stillwater, OK	**W** 10–3	**Mederos** **(1–1)**	Payero (0–2)	—	ESPN+	4,621	11–6	—
March 18	Seton Hall*	No. 11	O'Brate Stadium; Stillwater, OK	**W** 11–1	**Campbell** **(2–1)**	Waldis (0–4)	—	—	4,937	12–6	—
March 19	Seton Hall*	No. 11	O'Brate Stadium; Stillwater, OK	**W** 8–4	**Stone** **(1–0)**	Cinnella (0–1)	—	ESPN+	5,580	13–6	—
March 20	Seton Hall*	No. 11	O'Brate Stadium; Stillwater, OK	**W** 6–4	**Root** **(3–0)**	Probst (0–1)	**Martin** **(6)**	ESPN+	4,928	14–6	—
March 23	at Oral Roberts*	No. 9	J. L. Johnson Stadium; Tulsa, OK	**W** 9–4	**Bogusz** **(1–0)**	Roach (0–2)	—	—	1,682	15–6	—
March 25	Kansas	No. 9	O'Brate Stadium; Stillwater, OK	**W** 4–2	**Campbell** **(3–1)**	Hegarty (2–2)	—	ESPN+	5,997	16–6	1–0
March 26	Kansas	No. 9	O'Brate Stadium; Stillwater, OK	**W** 4–3	**Mederos** **(2–1)**	Larsen (0–4)	**Martin** **(7)**	—	6,550	17–6	2–0
March 27	Kansas	No. 9	O'Brate Stadium; Stillwater, OK	**W** 7–2	**Osmond** **(1–1)**	Vanderhei (3–2)	—	—	5,691	18–6	3–0
March 29	vs. Oklahoma*; Bedlam Series	No. 6	Oneok Field; Oklahoma City, OK	**L** 6–7	Horton (1–0)	**Martin** **(1–1)**	—	—	7,061	18–7	—

April (12–6)
Date	Opponent	Rank	Site/stadium	Score	Win	Loss	Save	TV	Attendance	Overall record	B12 Record
April 1	at Kansas State	No. 6	Tointon Family Stadium; Manhattan, KS	**W** 12–9	**Campbell** **(4–1)**	Corsentino (1–2)	**Martin** **(8)**	ESPN+	1,451	19–7	4–0
April 2	at Kansas State	No. 6	Tointon Family Stadium; Manhattan, KS	**W** 8–6	**Mederos** **(3–1)**	Hassall (3–4)	**Martin** **(9)**	ESPN+	2,344	20–7	5–0
April 3	at Kansas State	No. 6	Tointon Family Stadium; Manhattan, KS	**L** 2–7	Adams (3–2)	**Ure** **(0–1)**	—	ESPN+	2,344	20–8	5–1
April 5	at Wichita State*	No. 6	Eck Stadium; Wichita, KS	**W** 5–3	**Kyle** **(1–0)**	Ketelsen (1–1)	**McLean** **(1)**	ESPN+	1,723	21–8	—
April 8	Oklahoma; Bedlam Series	No. 6	O'Brate Stadium; Stillwater, OK	**L** 7–8	Campbell (1–0)	**Martin** **(1–2)**	Michael (5)	ESPN+	6,530	21–9	5–2
April 9	Oklahoma; Bedlam Series	No. 6	O'Brate Stadium; Stillwater, OK	**W** 8–7	**McLean** **(1–0)**	Horton (1–1)	—	ESPNU	7,811	22–9	6–2
April 10	Oklahoma; Bedlam Series	No. 6	O'Brate Stadium; Stillwater, OK	**W** 9–4	**Osmond** **(2–1)**	Martinez (2–3)	—	ESPN+	6,653	23–9	7–2
April 12	Wichita State*	No. 5	O'Brate Stadium; Stillwater, OK	**W** 8–5	**Morrill** **(1–0)**	Miner (0–2)	—	ESPN+	4,442	24–9	—
April 15	at West Virginia	No. 5	Monongalia County Ballpark; Granville, WV	**W** 2–1	**Campbell** **(5–1)**	Watters (2–2)	**McLean** **(2)**	ESPN+	3,291	25–9	8–2
April 16	at West Virginia	No. 5	Monongalia County Ballpark; Granville, WV	**L** 2–5	Hampton (6–2)	**Mederos** **(3–2)**	Braithwaite (4)	ESPN+	2,825	25–10	8–3
April 17	at West Virginia	No. 5	Monongalia County Ballpark; Granville, WV	**W** 13–3^{(8)}	**Osmond** **(3–1)**	Bravo (3–1)	—	ESPN+	1,840	26–10	9–3
April 19	Oral Roberts*	No. 3	O'Brate Stadium; Stillwater, OK	**L** 9–15^{(12)}	Hall (2–0)	**Root** **(3–1)**	—	ESPN+	4,381	26–11	—
April 22	No. 21 TCU	No. 3	O'Brate Stadium; Stillwater, OK	**W** 13–2	**Campbell** **(6–1)**	Cornelio (3–3)	—	ESPN+	5,576	27–11	10–3
April 23	No. 21 TCU	No. 3	O'Brate Stadium; Stillwater, OK	**L** 4–6	Perez (4–1)	**Mederos** **(3–3)**	Wright (1)	—	7,738	27–12	10–4
April 24	No. 21 TCU	No. 3	O'Brate Stadium; Stillwater, OK	**L** 6–7	Bolden (4–0)	**Morrill** **(1–1)**	Wright (2)	—	5,031	27–13	10–5
April 26	vs. Wichita State*	No. 8	Riverfront Stadium; Wichita, KS	**W** 12–6	**Bogusz** **(2–0)**	Hansen (0–1)	—	—	3,763	28–13	—
April 29	at No. 10 Texas	No. 8	UFCU Disch–Falk Field; Austin, TX	**W** 8–6	**Martin** **(2–2)**	Nixon (1–3)	**McLean** **(3)**	LHN	7,202	29–13	11–5
April 30	at No. 10 Texas	No. 8	UFCU Disch–Falk Field; Austin, TX	**W** 14–3	**Osmond** **(4–1)**	Stevens (5–5)	**Morrill** **(1)**	LHN	7,134	30–13	12–5

May (6–5)
Date	Opponent	Rank	Site/stadium	Score	Win	Loss	Save	TV	Attendance	Overall record	B12 Record
May 1	at No. 10 Texas	No. 8	UFCU Disch–Falk Field; Austin, TX	**W** 10–8	**Phansalkar** **(4–2)**	Cobb (2–1)	**McLean** **(4)**	LHN	7,139	31–13	13–5
May 6	SE Missouri State*	No. 3	O'Brate Stadium; Stillwater, OK	**W** 4–0	**Campbell** **(7–1)**	Rackers (4–2)	—	—	4,634	32–13	—
May 7	SE Missouri State*	No. 3	O'Brate Stadium; Stillwater, OK	**W** 11–6	**Phansalkar** **(5–2)**	Windt (4–2)	—	—	4,960	33–13	—
May 8	SE Missouri State*	No. 3	O'Brate Stadium; Stillwater, OK	**W** 15–3^{(7)}	**Martin** **(3–2)**	Williams (6–2)	**Bogusz** **(1)**	—	4,408	34–13	—
May 10	at Dallas Baptist*	No. 3	Horner Ballpark; Dallas, TX	**L** 7–8	Russell (3–0)	**McLean** **(1–1)**	—	BSSW	1,922	34–14	—
May 13	No. 9 Texas Tech	No. 3	O'Brate Stadium; Stillwater, OK	**L** 6–7	Morris (7–0)	**Campbell** **(7–2)**	Devine (1)	ESPN+	5,507	34–15	13–6
May 14	No. 9 Texas Tech	No. 3	O'Brate Stadium; Stillwater, OK	**L** 3–9	Birdsell (8–2)	**Osmond** **(4–2)**	—	ESPN+	6,077	34–16	13–7
May 15	No. 9 Texas Tech	No. 3	O'Brate Stadium; Stillwater, OK	**L** 4–6	Hampton (4–3)	**Martin** **(3–3)**	Becker (1)	ESPN+	5,372	34–17	13–8
May 19	at Baylor	No. 8	Baylor Ballpark; Waco, TX	**L** 11–13	Muirhead (1–0)	**Morrill** **(1–2)**	—	ESPN+	1,515	34–18	13–9
May 20	at Baylor	No. 8	Baylor Ballpark; Waco, TX	**W** 11–5	**Campbell** **(8–2)**	Marriott (2–3)	—	ESPN+	1,742	35–18	14–9
May 21	at Baylor	No. 8	Baylor Ballpark; Waco, TX	**W** 9–5^{(8)}	**Stone** **(2–0)**	Voelker (4–7)	**McLean** **(5)**	ESPN+	1,858	36–18	15–9

Postseason (6–3)

Big 12 Tournament (3–2)
Date	Opponent	Rank	Site/stadium	Score	Win	Loss	Save	TV	Attendance	Overall record	B12T Record
May 25	vs. (5) Texas	(4)	Globe Life Field; Arlington, TX	**L** 0–4	Hansen (10–1)	**Mederos** **(3–4)**	Stevens (2)	ESPNU	5,528	36–19	0–1
May 26	vs. (8) Baylor	(4)	Globe Life Field; Arlington, TX	**W** 11–1^{(7)}	**Campbell** **(9–2)**	Jackson (4–5)	—	ESPN+	6,288	37–19	1–1
May 27	vs. (1) TCU	(4)	Globe Life Field; Arlington, TX	**W** 8–4	**Phansalkar** **(6–2)**	Bolden (4–2)	—	ESPN+	7,178	38–19	2–1
May 28	vs. (5) Texas	(4)	Globe Life Field; Arlington, TX	**W** 8–1	**Bogusz** **(3–0)**	Morehouse (3–1)	—	ESPN+	8,317	39–19	3–1
May 28	vs. (5) Texas	(4)	Globe Life Field; Arlington, TX	**L** 2–9	Southard (3–1)	**Morrill** **(1–3)**	—	ESPN+	8,317	39–20	3–2

NCAA Stillwater Regional (3–1)
Date	Opponent	Rank	Site/stadium	Score	Win	Loss	Save	TV	Attendance	Overall record	NCAAT record
June 3	(4) Missouri State	(1)	O'Brate Stadium; Stillwater, OK	**W** 10–5				ESPN+		40–20	1–0
June 4	(2) Arkansas	(1)	O'Brate Stadium; Stillwater, OK	**L** 12–20				ESPN+		40–21	1–1
June 5	(4) Missouri State	(1)	O'Brate Stadium; Stillwater, OK	**W** 29–15				ESPN+		41–21	2–1
June 5	(2) Arkansas	(1)	O'Brate Stadium; Stillwater, OK	**W** 14–10^{10}				ESPN+		42–21	3–1
June 6	(2) Arkansas	(1)	O'Brate Stadium; Stillwater, OK					ESPN+			

Legend: = Win = Loss = Canceled
Bold = Oklahoma State team member
"*" indicates a non-conference game.
"#" represents ranking. All rankings are based on the team's current ranking in the D1Baseball poll.
"()" represents postseason seeding in the Big 12 Tournament or NCAA Regional, respectively.

== Rankings ==
Ranking movements Legend: ██ Increase in ranking ██ Decrease in ranking
	Week																			
Poll	Pre	1	2	3	4	5	6	7	8	9	10	11	12	13	14	15	16	17	18	Final
Coaches'	8	8*	8	12	15	13	9	7	6	4	7	4	3	8	7	5				
Baseball America	19	3	4	6	11	10	6	4	3	2	8	3	3	13	13	11				
Collegiate Baseball^	7	3	8	16	26	25	10	10	4	3	9	4	3	16	15	14				
NCBWA†	13	5	8	11	18	14	8	8	7	4	8	3	3	10	8	6				
D1Baseball	7	4	4	6	11	9	6	6	5	3	8	3	3	8	9					

^ Collegiate Baseball ranked 40 teams in their preseason poll, but only ranked 30 teams weekly during the season.
† NCBWA ranks 30 teams in their preseason poll, but only ranks 25 teams weekly during the season.
* A new poll was not released for this week, so for comparison purposes, the previous week's ranking is inserted in this week's slot.
