= 2022 TCU Horned Frogs baseball team =

College Baseball Season

2022 TCU Horned Frogs baseball

Big 12 regular season champions

NCAA tournament College Station Regional, 2–2
- Conference: Big 12 Conference
- CB: No. 15
- Record: 38–22 (16–8 Big 12)
- Head coach: Kirk Saarloos (1st as head coach, 10th overall season)
- Assistant coaches: Bill Mosiello (9th season); John DiLaura (4th season); Kyle Winkler (1st season); Matt Purke (2nd season)
- Home stadium: Lupton Stadium

2022 Big 12 Conference baseball standings
	Conf.				Overall
Team	W		L	PCT	W		L	PCT
No. 23 TCU ‍†‍‍^{y}	16	–	8	.667	38	–	22	.633
Oklahoma State ‍‍‍^{y}	15	–	9	.625	42	–	22	.656
No. 2 Oklahoma ‍‍‡‍^{y}	15	–	9	.625	45	–	24	.652
No. 24 Texas Tech ‍‍‍^{y}	15	–	9	.625	39	–	22	.639
No. 8 Texas ‍‍‍^{y}	14	–	10	.583	47	–	22	.681
West Virginia ‍‍‍	14	–	10	.583	33	–	22	.600
Kansas State ‍‍‍	8	–	16	.333	29	–	29	.500
Baylor ‍‍‍	7	–	17	.292	26	–	28	.481
Kansas ‍‍‍	4	–	20	.167	20	–	35	.364
† – Conference champion ‡ – Tournament champion y – Invited to the NCAA tournament Rankings from D1baseball

The 2022 TCU Horned Frogs baseball team represented Texas Christian University during the 2022 NCAA Division I baseball season. The Horned Frogs played their home games at Lupton Stadium as a member of the Big 12 Conference. They were led by head coach Kirk Saarloos, in his inaugural year as head coach and tenth season at TCU.

== Previous season ==
The 2021 TCU Horned Frogs baseball team notched a 41–20 (17–7) record. The Frogs claimed a share of the Big 12 regular season championship as well as the outright Big 12 Tournament championship. TCU received the #6 national seed in the 2021 NCAA tournament and hosted the Fort Worth Regional. The Horned Frogs were eliminated from the Tournament by cross-metroplex rival Dallas Baptist.

At the conclusion of the season, long-time TCU head coach Jim Schlossnagle departed the TCU baseball program and was replaced by 9-year assistant coach and former major league pitcher Kirk Saarloos. Saarloos retained Associate head coach Bill Mosiello, promoted John DiLaura from Volunteer Coach to Assistant Coach, retained student assistant coach and former TCU pitcher Matt Purke, and added former TCU-standout Kyle Winkler as the program's new Volunteer Assistant Coach. Winkler and Purke, both former All-American pitchers, were teammates on TCU's first-ever College World Series team in 2010.

== Personnel ==
=== Coaching staff ===
Name	Position	Seasons at TCU	Alma mater
Kirk Saarloos	Head coach	10	Cal State Fullerton (2001)
Bill Mosiello	Associate head coach	9	Fresno State (1986)
John DiLaura	Assistant coach	4	Michigan (2013)
Kyle Winkler	Volunteer assistant coach	1	TCU
Matt Purke	Student assistant coach	2	TCU

== Schedule and results ==
2022 TCU Horned Frogs baseball game log
Regular season (35–18)
February (6–1)

Date	Time (CT)	TV	Opponent	Rank	Stadium	Score	Win	Loss	Save	Attendance	Overall	Big 12	
Feb 18	6:00 pm	MLB Network	vs. San Diego State*	No. 17	Salt River Fields; Scottsdale, AZ	**W** 5–3	**Perez** (1–0)	Brodell (0–1)	**Ridings** (1)	—	1–0	—	Stats; Story
Feb 19	2:00 pm	—	vs. California*	No. 17	Salt River Fields; Scottsdale, AZ	**L** 6–7	Reinertsen (2–0)	**Thomas** (0–1)	—	—	1–1	—	Stats; Story
Feb 20	11:00 am	—	vs. Houston*	No. 17	Salt River Fields; Scottsdale, AZ	**W** 10–0^{(8)}	**Walker** (1–0)	Wright (0–1)	—	—	2–1	—	Stats; Story
Feb 22	6:00 pm	ESPN+	Stephen F. Austin*	No. 17	Lupton Stadium; Fort Worth, TX	**W** 11–1	**Brown** (1–0)	Dewberry (0–1)	—	3,731	3–1	—	Stats; Story
Feb 25	6:00 pm	FloSports	vs. Nebraska*	No. 17	Globe Life Field; Arlington, TX	**W** 4–1	**Krob** (1–0)	Perry (0–1)	**Ridings** (2)	4,912	4–1	—	Stats; Story
Feb 26	2:00 pm	FloSports	vs. Nebraska*	No. 17	Globe Life Field; Arlington, TX	**W** 8–3	**Cornelio** (1–0)	Schanaman (0–2)	**Bolden** (1)	5,476	5–1	—	Stats; Story
Feb 27	1:00 pm	FloSports	vs. Nebraska*	No. 17	Globe Life Field; Arlington, TX	**W** 5–3	**Walker** (2–0)	McCarville (0–1)	**Ridings** (3)	—	6–1	—	Stats; Story

March (12–6)

Date	Time (CT)	TV	Opponent	Rank	Stadium	Score	Win	Loss	Save	Attendance	Overall	Big 12	
Mar 1	6:00 pm	—	UT Arlington*	No. 16	Lupton Stadium; Fort Worth, TX	**W** 8–5	**Brown** (2–0)	Brooks (0–1)	**Ridings** (4)	3,434	7–1	—	Stats; Story
Mar 4	3:00 pm	SECN+	at Kentucky*	#16	Kentucky Proud Park; Lexington, KY	**L** 11–13	Harney (2–0)	**Perez** (1–1)	—	1,776	7–2	—	Stats; Story
Mar 5	12:00 pm	SECN+	at Kentucky*	No. 16	Kentucky Proud Park; Lexington, KY	**L** 1–5	Bosma (2–0)	**Cornelio** (1–1)	—	—	7–3	—	Stats; Story
Mar 5	5:00 pm	SECN+	at Kentucky*	No. 16	Kentucky Proud Park; Lexington, KY	**W** 12–8	**Ridings** (1–0)	Harper (0–1)	—	2,270	8–3	—	Stats; Story
Mar 8	11:00 am	ACCN+	at Louisville*	No. 21	Jim Patterson Stadium; Louisville, KY	**L** 8–9	Poland (1–1)	**Brown** (2–1)	Prosecky (3)	503	8–4	—	Stats; Story
Mar 12	1:00 pm	ESPN+	Army*	No. 21	Lupton Stadium; Fort Worth, TX	**W** 6–4	**Feser** (1–0)	Early (1–1)	—	—	9–4	—	Stats; Story
Mar 12	5:00 pm	ESPN+	Army*	No. 21	Lupton Stadium; Fort Worth, TX	**W** 6–5^{(10)}	**Ridings** (2–0)	Lepicio (0–1)	—	3,997	10–4	—	Stats; Story
Mar 13	1:00 pm	ESPN+	Army*	No. 21	Lupton Stadium; Fort Worth, TX	**W** 5–2	**Krob** (2–0)	Ruggieri (0–3)	**Perez** (1)	4,005	11–4	—	Stats; Story
Mar 15	6:00 pm	ESPN+	Texas A&M–CC*	No. 21	Lupton Stadium; Fort Worth, TX	**W** 17–6^{(8)}	**Bolden** (1–0)	Westbrook (1–1)	—	3,561	12–4	—	Stats; Story
Mar 18	6:30 pm	ESPN+	at Baylor	No. 21	Baylor Ballpark; Waco, TX	**W** 3–0	**Cornelio** (2–1)	Thomas (3–2)	**Ridings** (5)	2,309	13–4	1–0	Stats; Story
Mar 19	3:00 pm	ESPN+	at Baylor	No. 21	Baylor Ballpark; Waco, TX	**W** 11–9^{(11)}	**Savage** (1–0)	Voelker (1–3)	**Ridings** (6)	3,066	14–4	2–0	Stats; Story
Mar 20	1:00 pm	ESPN+	at Baylor	No. 21	Baylor Ballpark; Waco, TX	**L** 3–7	Rigney (1–0)	**Brown** (2–2)	Oliver (1)	2,011	14–5	2–1	Stats; Story
Mar 22	6:00 pm	ESPN+	at Abilene Christian*	No. 19	Crutcher Scott Field; Abilene, TX	**W** 14–3^{(7)}	**Parker** (1–0)	Bauman (0–2)	—	—	15–5	—	Stats; Story
Mar 25	6:00 pm	ESPN+	Kansas State	No. 19	Lupton Stadium; Fort Worth, TX	**W** 7–5	**Cornelio** (3–1)	Adams (2–2)	**Ridings** (7)	4,743	16–5	3–1	Stats; Story
Mar 26	2:00 pm	ESPN+	Kansas State	No. 19	Lupton Stadium; Fort Worth, TX	**W** 14–5	**Vail** (1–0)	Jurecka (1–1)	—	3,804	17–5	4–1	Stats; Story
Mar 27	1:00 pm	ESPN+	Kansas State	No. 19	Lupton Stadium; Fort Worth, TX	**W** 11–3	**Walker** (3–0)	Hassall (3–3)	—	4,047	18–5	5–1	Stats; Story
Mar 29	6:00 pm	ESPN+	Abilene Christian*	No. 12	Lupton Stadium; Fort Worth, TX	**L** 2–6	Carlton (1–0)	**Parker** (1–1)	—	3,651	18–6	—	Stats; Story
Mar 30	6:00 pm	ESPN+	UTSA*	No. 12	Lupton Stadium; Fort Worth, TX	**L** 8–12	Ward (1–0)	**Oliver** (0–1)	—	3,301	18–7	—	Stats; Story

April (9–9)

Date	Time (CT)	TV	Opponent	Rank	Stadium	Score	Win	Loss	Save	Attendance	Overall	Big 12	
April 1	6:00 pm	ESPN+	West Virginia	No. 12	Lupton Stadium; Fort Worth, TX	**L** 2–3	Braithwaite (1–0)	**Ridings** (2–1)	Short (1)	3,902	18–8	5–2	Stats; Story
April 2	2:00 pm	ESPN+	West Virginia	No. 12	Lupton Stadium; Fort Worth, TX	**W** 5–4	**Perez** (2–1)	Hampton (4–2)	**Ridings** (8)	4,668	19–8	6–2	Stats; Story
April 3	12:00 pm	ESPN+	West Virginia	No. 12	Lupton Stadium; Fort Worth, TX	**L** 2–5	Bravo (3–0)	**Walker** (3–1)	Braithwaite (2)	4,013	19–9	6–3	Stats; Story
April 5	6:30 pm	ESPN+	at UT Arlington*	No. 23	Clay Gould Ballpark; Arlington, TX	**W** 10–2	**Bolden** (2–0)	Novis (0–1)	—	730	20–9	—	Stats; Story
April 8	6:30 pm	LHN	at No. 7 Texas	No. 23	UFCU Disch–Falk Field; Austin, TX	**L** 0–2	Hansen (6–0)	**Cornelio** (3–2)	—	7,482	20–10	6–4	Stats; Story
April 9	5:00 pm	ESPNU	at No. 7 Texas	No. 23	UFCU Disch–Falk Field; Austin, TX	**W** 7–5	**Bolden** (3–0)	Stevens (4–3)	**Ridings** (9)	7,323	21–10	7–4	Stats; Story
April 10	12:00 pm	ESPNU	at No. 7 Texas	No. 23	UFCU Disch–Falk Field; Austin, TX	**L** 3–7	Sthele (3–0)	**Walker** (3–2)	—	7,106	21–11	7–5	Stats; Story
April 12	6:30 pm	Bally Sports Southwest	at No. 16 Dallas Baptist*		Horner Ballpark; Dallas, TX	**L** 1–6	Heaton (3–1)	**Parker** (1–2)	—	1,561	21–12	—	Stats; Story
April 14	6:00 pm	ESPN+	No. 4 Texas Tech		Lupton Stadium; Fort Worth, TX	**W** 7–4	**Mihlbauer** (1–0)	Clark (0–1)	**Savage** (1)	5,475	22–12	8–5	Stats; Story
April 15	6:00 pm	ESPN+	No. 4 Texas Tech		Lupton Stadium; Fort Worth, TX	**W** 4–3	**Perez** (3–1)	Birdsell (5–2)	**Ridings** (10)	6,280	23–12	9–5	Stats; Story
April 16	2:00 pm	ESPN+	No. 4 Texas Tech		Lupton Stadium; Fort Worth, TX	**W** 11–3	**Walker** (4–2)	Hampton (3–3)	—	5,706	24–12	10–5	Stats; Story
April 19	6:00 pm	ESPN+	UT Arlington*	No. 21	Lupton Stadium; Fort Worth, TX	**W** 15–1^{(7)}	**Parker** (2–2)	Hagan (1–3)	—	3,533	25–12	—	Stats; Story
April 22	6:00 pm	ESPN+	at No. 3 Oklahoma State	No. 21	O'Brate Stadium; Stillwater, OK	**L** 2–13	Campbell (6–1)	**Cornelio** (3–3)	—	5,576	25–13	10–6	Stats; Story
April 23	5:00 pm	ESPN+	at No. 3 Oklahoma State	No. 21	O'Brate Stadium; Stillwater, OK	**W** 6–4	**Perez** (4–1)	Mederos (3–3)	**Wright** (1)	7,738	26–13	11–6	Stats; Story
April 24	12:00 pm	—	at No. 3 Oklahoma State	No. 21	O'Brate Stadium; Stillwater, OK	**W** 7–6	**Bolden** (4–0)	Morrill (1–1)	**Wright** (2)	5,031	27–13	12–6	Stats; Story
April 26	6:00 pm	ESPN+	Dallas Baptist*	No. 20	Lupton Stadium; Fort Worth, TX	**L** 5–6	Sherlin (2–0)	**Ridings** (2–2)	Russell (1)	4,089	27–14	—	Stats; Story
April 29	6:00 pm	ACCN	at Florida State*	No. 20	Dick Howser Stadium; Tallahassee, FL	**L** 0–10	Messick (6–2)	**Cornelio** (3–4)	—	4,241	27–15	—	Stats; Story
April 30	5:00 pm	ACCN	at Florida State*	No. 20	Dick Howser Stadium; Tallahassee, FL	**L** 3–7	Crowell (4–0)	**Savage** (1–1)	—	4,644	27–16	—	Stats; Story

May (8–2)

Date	Time (CT)	TV	Opponent	Rank	Stadium	Score	Win	Loss	Save	Attendance	Overall	Big 12	
May 1	11:00 am	ACCN	at Florida State*	No. 20	Dick Howser Stadium; Tallahassee, FL	**Canceled due to weather conditions**							
May 6	6:00 pm	ESPN+	Oklahoma	No. 24	Lupton Stadium; Fort Worth, TX	**W** 9–7	**Brown** (3–2)	Bennett (4–3)	**Wright** (3)	4,324	28–16	13–6	Stats; Story
May 7	2:00 pm	ESPN+	Oklahoma	No. 24	Lupton Stadium; Fort Worth, TX	**L** 7–11	Sandlin (4–3)	**Perez** (4–2)	Martinez (1)	4,055	28–17	13–7	Stats; Story
May 8	1:00 pm	ESPN+	Oklahoma	No. 24	Lupton Stadium; Fort Worth, TX	**L** 1–5	Campbell (2–0)	**Bolden** (4–1)	Michael (7)	3,948	28–18	13–8	Stats; Story
May 10	6:00 pm	ESPN+	Incarnate Word*		Lupton Stadium; Fort Worth, TX	**W** 11–7^{(11)}	**Hill** (1–0)	Hayward (1–7)	—	3,386	29–18	—	Stats; Story
May 13	6:00 pm	ESPN+	at Kansas		Hoglund Ballpark; Lawrence, KS	**W** 15–6	**Brown** (4–2)	Hegarty (6–5)	—	1,013	30–18	14–8	Stats; Story
May 14	2:00 pm	ESPN+	at Kansas		Hoglund Ballpark; Lawrence, KS	**W** 30–3	**Perez** (5–2)	Larsen (1–8)	—	1,003	31–18	15–8	Stats; Story
May 15	1:00 pm	ESPN+	at Kansas		Hoglund Ballpark; Lawrence, KS	**W** 8–2	**Mihlbauer** (2–0)	Vanderhei (5–6)	—	717	32–18	16–8	Stats; Story
May 17	6:00 pm	ESPN+	Tarleton State*	No. 24	Lupton Stadium; Fort Worth, TX	**Canceled**							
May 19	6:00 pm	ESPN+	Santa Clara*	No. 24	Lupton Stadium; Fort Worth, TX	**W** 7–6	**Walker** (5–2)	Pilchard (1–2)	**Savage** (2)	3,568	33–18	—	Stats; Story
May 20	6:00 pm	ESPN+	Santa Clara*	No. 24	Lupton Stadium; Fort Worth, TX	**W** 10–3	**Perez** (6–2)	Hales (3–3)	—	3,748	34–18	—	Stats; Story
May 21	2:00 pm	ESPN+	Santa Clara*	No. 24	Lupton Stadium; Fort Worth, TX	**W** 9–1	**Cornelio** (4-4)	Feikes (5–6)	—	3,805	35–18	—	Stats; Story

Postseason (3–4)

Big 12 Tournament (1–2)
Date	Time (CT)	TV	Opponent	Seed	Stadium	Score	Win	Loss	Save	Attendance	Overall record	Tournament record	Notes
May 25	12:30 pm	ESPN+	vs. (8) Baylor	(1) No. 18	Globe Life Field; Arlington, TX	**W** 4–2	**Mihlbauer** (3-0)	Golomb (0–1)	**Wright** (3)	—	36–18	1–0	Stats; Story
May 26	4:00 pm	ESPNU	vs. (5) No. 19 Texas	(1) No. 18	Globe Life Field; Arlington, TX	**L** 3–5	Gordon (7–1)	**Perez** (6-3)	Stevens (3)	—	36–19	1–1	Stats; Story
May 26	3:15 pm	ESPNU	vs. (4) No. 9 Oklahoma State	(1) No. 18	Globe Life Field; Arlington, TX	**L** 4–8	Phansalkar (6–2)	**Bolden** (4-2)	—	—	36–20	1–2	Stats; Story

NCAA College Station Regional (2–1)
Date	Time (CT)	TV	Opponent	Seed	Stadium	Score	Win	Loss	Save	Attendance	Overall record	Regional Record	Notes
June 3	7:00 pm	ESPN+	vs. (3) Louisiana	(2) No. 22	Olsen Field; College Station, TX	**L** 6–7	Bonds (5–3)	**Cornelio** (4–5)	—	6,138	36–21	0–1	Stats; Story
June 4	12:00 pm	ESPN+	vs. (4) Oral Roberts	(2) No. 22	Olsen Field; College Station, TX	**W** 3–1	**Bolden** (5–2)	Coffey (7–6)	**Wright** (5)	6,048	37–21	1–1	Stats; Story
June 5	1:00 pm	ESPN+	vs. (3) Louisiana	(2) No. 22	Olsen Field; College Station, TX	**W** 6–1	**Brown** (5–3)	Wilson (4–4)	—	6,115	38–21	2–1	Stats
June 5	7:00 pm	ESPN+	vs. (1) No. 5 Texas A&M	(2) No. 22	Olsen Field; College Station, TX	**L** 9–15	Johnston (2–1)	**Ridings** (2–3)	—	6,525	38–22	2–2	Stats

Legend: = Win = Loss = Canceled Bold = TCU team member
"*" indicates a non-conference game.
"#" represents ranking. All rankings from D1Baseball on the date of the contest.
"()" represents postseason seeding in the Big 12 Tournament or NCAA Regional, respectively.

== Rankings ==
Ranking movements Legend: ██ Increase in ranking ██ Decrease in ranking — = Not ranked
	Week																		
Poll	Pre	1	2	3	4	5	6	7	8	9	10	11	12	13	14	15	16	17	Final
Coaches'	18	18*	14	20	21	19	11	21	—	20	19	—	—	—					
Baseball America	—	—	—	—	—	—	—	—	—	15	7	16	20	15					
Collegiate Baseball^	13	14	18	28	28	27	24	—	—	22	18	28	28	15					
NCBWA†	20	19	17	23	21	20	12	—	26	21	18	28	27						
D1Baseball	17	17	16	21	21	19	12	23	—	21	20	24	—	24					

^ Collegiate Baseball ranked 40 teams in their preseason poll, but only ranked 30 teams weekly during the season.
† NCBWA ranks 30 teams in their preseason poll, but only ranks 25 teams weekly during the season.
* A new poll was not released for this week, so for comparison purposes, the previous week's ranking is inserted in this week's slot.
