= 2023 Metro Atlantic Athletic Conference baseball tournament =

- Teams: 6
- Format: Double-elimination
- Finals site: Clover Stadium; Pomona, New York
- Champions: Rider (4th title)

2023 Metro Atlantic Athletic Conference baseball standings
	Conf.						Overall
Team	W		L		T	PCT	W		L		T	PCT
Fairfield ‍†‍‍	16	–	5	–	0	.762	38	–	18	–	0	.679
Rider ‍‍‡‍^{y}	14	–	7	–	0	.667	35	–	19	–	0	.648
Canisius ‍‍‍	16	–	8	–	0	.667	26	–	25	–	1	.510
Quinnipiac ‍‍‍	16	–	8	–	0	.667	30	–	26	–	0	.536
Niagara ‍‍‍	14	–	10	–	0	.583	24	–	22	–	1	.521
Manhattan ‍‍‍	13	–	11	–	0	.542	22	–	34	–	0	.393
Mount St. Mary's ‍‍‍	10	–	14	–	0	.417	25	–	27	–	0	.481
Marist ‍‍‍	10	–	14	–	0	.417	16	–	36	–	0	.308
Iona ‍‍‍	9	–	15	–	0	.375	13	–	38	–	0	.255
Siena ‍‍‍	7	–	17	–	0	.292	14	–	41	–	0	.255
Saint Peter's ‍‍‍	4	–	20	–	0	.167	9	–	41	–	0	.180
† – Conference champion ‡ – Tournament champion y – Invited to the NCAA Tournament; As of May 28, 2023; Rankings from D1Baseball

The 2023 Metro Atlantic Athletic Conference baseball tournament was held from May 24 through 27. The top six regular season finishers of the league's eleven teams met in the double-elimination tournament held at Clover Stadium in Pomona, New York. The tournament champion, Rider, earned the conference's automatic bid to the 2023 NCAA Division I baseball tournament.

== Seeding ==
The top six teams will be seeded one through four based on their conference winning percentage. They then play a double-elimination tournament.

== Results ==
Upper round 1	Upper round 2	Upper final	Final
1	Fairfield	8
3	Canisius	3	6	Manhattan	7
6	Manhattan	17	1	Fairfield	3
2	Rider	6
2	Rider	8
4	Quinnipiac	13	4	Quinnipiac	0
5	Niagara	2
2	Rider	7	18
1	Fairfield	8	4
Lower round 1	Lower round 2	Lower round 3	Lower final
4	Quinnipiac	4
3	Canisius	6	1	Fairfield	12
3	Canisius	8	4	Quinnipiac	7
3	Canisius	6	6	Manhattan	7
5	Niagara	2

== Schedule ==
The tournament schedule was as follows:

Game	Time*	Matchup^{#}	Score	Television
Wednesday, May 24
1	11:00am	No. 6 Manhattan vs No. 3 Canisius	17–3	ESPN+
2	3:00pm	No. 5 Niagara vs No. 4 Quinnipiac	2–13	ESPN+
3	7:00pm	No. 5 Niagara vs No. 3 Canisius Elimination Game	2–6	ESPN+
Thursday, May 25
4	11:00am	No. 6 Manhattan vs. No. 1 Fairfield	7–8	ESPN+
5	3:00pm	No. 4 Quinnipiac vs No. 2 Rider	0–8	ESPN+
6	7:00pm	No. 6 Manhattan vs No. 3 Canisius Elimination Game	7–8	ESPN+
Friday, May 26
7	11:00am	No. 2 Rider vs No. 1 Fairfield	6–3	ESPN+
8	3:00pm	No. 4 Quinnipiac vs No. 3 Canisius Elimination Game	8–7	ESPN+
9	7:00pm	No. 4 Quinnipiac vs No. 1 Fairfield Elimination Game	4–12	ESPN+
Championship – Saturday, May 27
10	12:00pm	No. 2 Rider vs No. 1 Fairfield	7–8	ESPN+
11	3:45pm	No. 1 Fairfield vs No. 2 Rider	4–18	ESPN+
*Game times in EDT. # – Rankings denote tournament seed.
