= Canisius Golden Griffins baseball =

Varsity intercollegiate baseball team of Canisius University in Buffalo, NY

Canisius Golden Griffins
- 2026 Canisius Golden Griffins baseball team
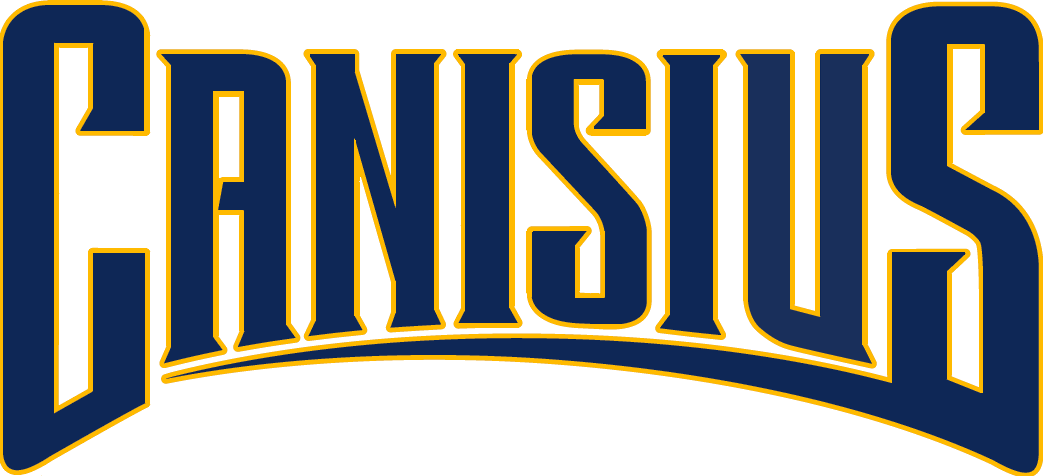
- Founded: 1954
- University: Canisius University
- Head coach: Matt Mazurek (9th season)
- Conference: MAAC
- Location: Buffalo, New York
- Home stadium: Demske Sports Complex (capacity: 1,200)
- Nickname: Golden Griffins
- Colors: Blue and gold

NCAA tournament appearances
- 2013, 2015, 2018, 2022

Conference tournament champions
- MAAC: 2013, 2015, 2018, 2022

Conference regular season champions
- MAAC Northern: 1994; MAAC: 2008, 2010, 2014, 2019

The Canisius Golden Griffins baseball team is a varsity intercollegiate athletic team of Canisius University in Buffalo, New York, United States. The team is a member of the Metro Atlantic Athletic Conference, which is part of the National Collegiate Athletic Association's Division I. The team plays home games at the Demske Sports Complex in Buffalo, New York. The Golden Griffins are coached by Matt Mazurek.

== Canisius in the NCAA Tournament ==
Year	Record	Pct	Notes
2013	0–2	.000	Chapel Hill Regional
2015	0–2	.000	Springfield Regional
2018	0–2	.000	Minneapolis Regional
2022	0–2	.000	Coral Gables Regional
TOTALS	0-8	.000	

== Year-by-year results ==
Below is a table of the program's yearly records.

Statistics overview
Season	Coach	Overall	Conference	Standing	Postseason
Independent (1954–1989)
1954	Bob MacKinnon	8-4			
1955	Bob MacKinnon	9-5			
1956	Bob MacKinnon	10-3			
1957	Bob MacKinnon	7-2			
1958	Bob MacKinnon	12-8			
1959	Bob MacKinnon	6-11			
1960	Dave Markey	10-5			
1961	Dave Markey	10-4			
1962	Dave Markey	7-7			
1963	Dave Markey	3-6			
1964	Dave Markey	3-11			
1965	Dave Markey	3-10			
1966	Dave Markey	4-7			
1967	Dave Markey	3-11			
1968	Dave Markey	7-8			
1969	Dave Markey	3-4			
1970	Dave Markey	7-9			
1971	Dave Markey	1-7			
1972	John Morrison	9-4			
1973	James Kennerson	5-6			
1974	James Kennerson	5-9			
1975	Pete Leo	5-9			
1976	Pete Leo	3-7			
1977	Don Colpoys	7-19			
1978	Don Colpoys	10-12			
1979	Don Colpoys	8-20			
1980	Don Colpoys	7-23			
1981	Don Colpoys	9-14			
1982	Don Colpoys	14-15			
1983	Don Colpoys	12-11			
1984	Don Colpoys	14-10			
1985	Don Colpoys	15-13			
1986	Don Colpoys	18-6			
1987	Don Colpoys	11-12			
1988	Don Colpoys	11-17			
1989	Don Colpoys	12-23			
Independent:		288-352			
Metro Atlantic Athletic Conference (1990–present)
1990	Don Colpoys	11-20-1	6-6	2nd (Northern)	
1991	Don Colpoys	13-33	6-11	3rd (Northern)	
1992	Don Colpoys	13-22	8-10	2nd (Northern)	
1993	Don Colpoys	13-25-1	7-11	t-2nd (Northern)	
1994	Don Colpoys	28-14	17-1	1st (Northern)	MAAC tournament
1995	Don Colpoys	21-20	7-11	3rd (Northern)	
1996	Don Colpoys	13-22	5-13	4th (Northern)	
1997	Don Colpoys	18-19	5-13	4th (Northern)	
1998	Don Colpoys	11-32	7-19	5th (Northern)	
1999	Don Colpoys	13-26	8-18	5th (Northern)	
2000	Don Colpoys	9-33	4-23	10th	
2001	Don Colpoys	14-28	10-17	8th	
2002	Mark Notaro	4-38	3-24	10th	
2003	Mark Notaro	4-38-1	3-23	10th	
2004	Mark Notaro	4-43	4-23	t-9th	
2005	Mike McRae	9-38	5-21	9th	
2006	Mike McRae	18-36	9-18	8th	
2007	Mike McRae	20-35	13-12	4th	MAAC tournament
2008	Mike McRae	41-13	19-5	t-1st	MAAC tournament
2009	Mike McRae	36-22	16-8	2nd	MAAC tournament
2010	Mike McRae	39-21	19-5	1st	MAAC tournament
2011	Mike McRae	26-32	12-10	t-4th	MAAC tournament
2012	Mike McRae	33-27	16-8	2nd	MAAC tournament
2013	Mike McRae	42-17	15-9	t-3rd	NCAA Regional
2014	Mike McRae	40-16	20-4	1st	MAAC tournament
2015	Mike McRae	34-30	16-8	2nd	NCAA Regional
2016	Mike McRae	32-27	16-8	t-2nd	MAAC tournament
2017	Mike McRae	35-22	16-8	t-2nd	MAAC tournament
2018	Matt Mazurek	35-22	16-8	t-2nd	NCAA Regional
2019	Matt Mazurek	24-29	17-7	t-1st	MAAC tournament
2020	Matt Mazurek	3-11-1	0-0		Season canceled due to COVID-19
2021	Matt Mazurek	20-16	17-13	4th	MAAC tournament
2022	Matt Mazurek	29-25	15-9	3rd	NCAA Regional
2023	Matt Mazurek	26-25-1	16-8	t-3rd	MAAC tournament
2024	Matt Mazurek	18-30	11-13	5th	MAAC tournament
2025	Matt Mazurek	14-31	10-19	12th	
MAAC:		815-990–6	426-448		
Total:		1,103-1,342-6			
National champion Postseason invitational champion Conference regular season champion Conference regular season and conference tournament champion Division regular season champion Division regular season and conference tournament champion Conference tournament champion

== Major League Baseball ==
Canisius has had 17 Major League Baseball draft selections since the draft began in 1965.

Golden Griffins in the Major League Baseball Draft
Year	Player	Round	Team
1980	Raymond Jablonski	7	Pirates
1994	Joseph Mamott	6	Red Sox
2009	Kevin Mailloux	45	Mariners
2009	Kevin Mahoney	23	Yankees
2010	Steve McQuail	30	Blue Jays
2011	Shane Davis	42	Blue Jays
2011	Chris Cox	39	Blue Jays
2011	Sean Jamieson	17	Athletics
2013	Garrett Cortright	40	Orioles
2014	Rohn Pierce	19	Mariners
2015	Brett Siddall	13	Athletics
2015	Devon Stewart	9	Indians
2015	Connor Panas	9	Blue Jays
2017	Jake Lumley	33	Athletics
2018	Tyler Smith	8	Angels
2023	Matt Duffy	4	Red Sox
2024	Jackson Strong	7	Tigers

== See also ==
- List of NCAA Division I baseball programs
