= 2022 Arizona Wildcats baseball team =

2022 Arizona Wildcats baseball

Coral Gables Regional, 2–2
- Conference: Pac-12 Conference
- Record: 39–25 (16–14 Pac-12)
- Head coach: Chip Hale (1st season)
- Assistant coaches: Dave Lawn (7th season); Trip Couch (1st season); Toby Demello (1st season)
- Home stadium: Hi Corbett Field

2022 Pac-12 Conference baseball standings
	Conf.						Overall
Team	W		L		T	PCT	W		L		T	PCT
No. 2 Stanford ‍†‍‡‍^{y}	21	–	9	–	0	.700	47	–	16	–	0	.746
No. 3 Oregon State ‍‍‍^{y}	20	–	10	–	0	.667	48	–	18	–	0	.727
No. 19 UCLA ‍‍‍^{y}	19	–	11	–	0	.633	40	–	24	–	0	.625
Oregon ‍‍‍^{y}	18	–	12	–	0	.600	36	–	25	–	0	.590
Arizona ‍‍‍^{y}	16	–	14	–	0	.533	39	–	25	–	0	.609
Washington ‍‍‍	14	–	16	–	0	.467	30	–	26	–	0	.536
California ‍‍‍	14	–	16	–	0	.467	29	–	27	–	0	.518
Arizona State ‍‍‍	13	–	17	–	0	.433	26	–	31	–	0	.456
Washington State ‍‍‍	12	–	18	–	0	.400	27	–	26	–	0	.509
Utah ‍‍‍	10	–	20	–	0	.333	26	–	27	–	1	.491
USC ‍‍‍	8	–	22	–	0	.267	25	–	28	–	0	.472
† – Conference champion ‡ – Tournament champion y – Invited to the NCAA tournament As of June 13, 2022; Rankings from D1Baseball

The 2022 Arizona Wildcats baseball team represented the University of Arizona during the 2022 NCAA Division I baseball season. The Wildcats played their home games for the 11th season at Hi Corbett Field. The team was coached by Chip Hale in his 1st season at Arizona. Previous head coach Jay Johnson - who had been with the program for 6 seasons - was hired during the offseason as the head coach at LSU, filling the vacancy left by the retirement of Paul Mainieri. The Wildcats finished 5th in the Pac-12, but were selected into the NCAA tournament for the 2nd straight year for the first time since 2016–17. The Wildcats lost to Ole Miss in the regional final of the Coral Gables Regional.

== Previous season ==
The Wildcats finished the 2021 season with a record of 45–18 (21–9 Conf.), making a run to the College World Series for the first time since 2016. They would eventually be eliminated in two games after losing consecutive games to Vanderbilt and Stanford. For the first time since 2012 (when the Wildcats last won the College World Series), Hi Corbett Field was selected as both an NCAA postseason Regional and Super Regional site. The Wildcats also won their first Pac-12 Conference championship since the 2012 season, and their first outright conference championship since 1989.

== Personnel ==
=== Roster ===
2022 Arizona Wildcats roster
Pitchers • 12 - Garrett Irvin - Senior • 14 - Jonathan Guardado - Senior • 19 - Drew Calloway - Freshman • 22 - Chandler Murphy - Sophomore • 23 - Holden Christian - Senior • 25 - TJ Nichols - Sophomore • 26 - Jackson Kent - Freshman • 27 - Dawson Netz - Sophomore • 29 - Eric Orloff - Freshman • 30 - Reed Schaefer - Freshman • 34 - Anthony Susac - Freshman • 36 - George Arias Jr. - Junior • 37 - Josh Randall - Freshman • 40 - Quinn Flanagan - Junior • 43 - Javyn Pimental - Freshman • 45 - Mason Millett - Sophomore • 46 - Chris Barraza - Junior • 51 - Trevor Long - Sophomore	Catchers • 6 - Daniel Susac - Sophomore • 50 - Cameron Laliberte - Sophomore Infielders • 1 - Garen Caulfield - Freshman • 2 - Jack Grant - Freshman • 3 - Tony Bullard - Junior • 11 - Nik McClaughry - Junior • 15 - Luis Tuero - Junior • 33 - Noah Turley - Sophomore	Outfielders • 5 - Chase Davis - Sophomore • 7 - Mac Bingham - Sophomore • 10 - Tag Bross - Freshman • 13 - Tyler Casagrande - Junior • 16 - Kyle Casper - Freshman • 17 - Matty Clark - Freshman • 18 - David Shackelford - Freshman • 28 - Blake Paugh - Senior • 44 - Tanner O'Tremba - Sophomore Utility • 20 - Tommy Splaine - Freshman • 24 - Jacob Shaver - Sophomore

=== Coaches ===
2022 Arizona Wildcats baseball coaching staff
- Chip Hale - Head coach
- Dave Lawn - Assistant coach
- Trip Couch - Assistant coach
- Toby Demello - Volunteer assistant coach

=== Opening day ===
Opening Day Starters
Name	Position
Mac Bingham	Center fielder
Tyler Casagrande	Second baseman
Daniel Susac	Catcher
Tanner O'Tremba	Right fielder
Chase Davis	Left fielder
Noah Turley	First baseman
Garen Caulfield	Third baseman
Blake Paugh	Designated hitter
Nik McClaughry	Shortstop
TJ Nichols	Starting pitcher

== Schedule and results ==
2022 Arizona Wildcats baseball game log
Regular season
Date	Opponent	Rank	Site/stadium	Score	Win	Loss	Save	Overall Record	Pac-12 Record
Feb 18	vs Kansas State	#15	Globe Life Field • Arlington, TX	W 8–6	Arias Jr. (1–0)	Adams (0–1)	Christian (1)	1–0	
Feb 19	vs Oklahoma	#15	Globe Life Field • Arlington, TX	W 14–4	Flanagan (1–0)	Sandlin (0–1)	None	2–0	
Feb 20	vs #12 Texas Tech	#15	Globe Life Field • Arlington, TX	W 13–2	Netz (1–0)	Molina (0–1)	None	3–0	
Feb 22	Grand Canyon	#11	Hi Corbett Field • Tucson, AZ	L 3–19	Markl (1–0)	Orloff (0–1)	None	3–1	
Feb 24	Milwaukee	#11	Hi Corbett Field • Tucson, AZ	W 14–3	Susac (1–0)	Frey (1–1)	None	4–1	
Feb 25	Milwaukee	#11	Hi Corbett Field • Tucson, AZ	W 9–1	Nichols (1–0)	Mahoney (0–1)	None	5–1	
Feb 26	Milwaukee	#11	Hi Corbett Field • Tucson, AZ	W 9–1	Irvin (1–0)	Blubaugh (1–1)	None	6–1	
Feb 27	Milwaukee	#11	Hi Corbett Field • Tucson, AZ	W 8–6	Randall (1–0)	Hoerter (1–1)	Christian (2)	7–1	
Mar 1	Dixie State	#11	Hi Corbett Field • Tucson, AZ	W 2–1	Christian (1–0)	Wright (0–1)	None	8–1	
Mar 4	Texas State	#11	Hi Corbett Field • Tucson, AZ	W 7–2	Nichols (2–0)	Wood (1–1)	None	9–1	
Mar 5	Texas State	#11	Hi Corbett Field • Tucson, AZ	L 2–6	Wells (1–0)	Irvin (1–1)	Stivors (3)	9–2	
Mar 6	Texas State	#11	Hi Corbett Field • Tucson, AZ	L 3–7	Robie (2–0)	Flanagan (1–1)	None	9–3	
Mar 8	New Mexico	#16	Hi Corbett Field • Tucson, AZ	W 12–5	Pimental (1–0)	Makil (0–1)	None	10–3	
Mar 11	at California	#16	Evans Diamond • Berkeley, CA	L 8–9	Stamos (1–0)	Christian (1–1)	None	10–4	0–1
Mar 12	at California	#16	Evans Diamond • Berkeley, CA	W 10–4	Irvin (2–1)	Proctor (1–1)	None	11–4	1–1
Mar 13	at California	#16	Evans Diamond • Berkeley, CA	W 13–5	Netz (2–0)	Reinertse (2–2)	None	12–4	2–1
Mar 14	at Pacific	#16	Klein Family Field • Stockton, CA	W 13–4	Flanagan (2–1)	Fortner (0–1)	None	13–4	
Mar 19	#12 Stanford	#16	Hi Corbett Field • Tucson, AZ	W 3–2	Nichols (3–0)	O'Rourke (0–3)	Long (1)	14–4	3–1
Mar 20	#12 Stanford	#16	Hi Corbett Field • Tucson, AZ	W 6–5	Christian (2–1)	Dixon (1–1)	None	15–4	4–1
Mar 21	Stanford	#11	Hi Corbett Field • Tucson, AZ	W 10–3	Flanagan (3–1)	Uber (1–1)	None	16–4	5–1
Mar 23	at New Mexico	#11	Santa Ana Star Field • Albuquerque, NM	L 7–12	Strmiska (1–0)	Susac (1–1)	Armbruester (1)	16–5	
Mar 25	UCLA	#11	Hi Corbett Field • Tucson, AZ	L 2–10	Brooks (4–2)	Nichols (3–1)	None	16–6	5–2
Mar 26	UCLA	#11	Hi Corbett Field • Tucson, AZ	W 4–2	Irvin (3–1)	Rajcic (2–3)	Christian (3)	17–6	6–2
Mar 27	UCLA	#12	Hi Corbett Field • Tucson, AZ	L 3–7	Hurd (2–0)	Netz (2–1)	None	17–7	6–3
Mar 29	at Grand Canyon	#15	Brazell Field • Phoenix, AZ	W 5–3	Orloff (1–1)	Young (1–3)	Christian (4)	18–7	
Apr 1	at Washington	#15	Husky Ballpark • Seattle, WA	W 8–3	Nichols (4–1)	Engman (2–4)	None	19–7	7–3
Apr 2	at Washington	#15	Husky Ballpark • Seattle, WA	W 6–2	Barraza (1–0)	Raeth (4–1)	Christian (5)	20–7	8–3
Apr 3	at Washington	#15	Husky Ballpark • Seattle, WA	W 7–6	Long (1–0)	Raeth (4–2)	None	21–7	9–3
Apr 5	at Arizona State	#11	Phoenix Municipal Stadium • Phoenix, AZ	L 6–10	Levine (2–1)	Arias Jr. (1–1)	Pivaroff (1)	21–8	
Apr 8	Washington State	#11	Hi Corbett Field • Tucson, AZ	L 5–11	McMillan (2–3)	Nichols (4–2)	None	21–9	9–4
Apr 9	Washington State	#11	Hi Corbett Field • Tucson, AZ	L 5–6	Grillo (1–0)	Christian (2–2)	None	21–10	9–5
Apr 10	Washington State	#11	Hi Corbett Field • Tucson, AZ	W 5–2	Murphy (1–0)	Cottrell (1–6)	Long (2)	22–10	10–5
Apr 12	New Mexico State	#20	Hi Corbett Field • Tucson, AZ	W 4–2	Long (2–0)	Swenson (1–2)	None	23–10	
Apr 14	at Utah	#20	Smith's Ballpark • Salt Lake City, UT	W 7–6	Nichols (5–2)	Sox (2–2)	Long (3)	24–10	11–5
Apr 15	at Utah	#20	Smith's Ballpark • Salt Lake City, UT	L 5–9	Schramm (4–0)	Irvin (3–2)	Whiting (5)	24–11	11–6
Apr 16	at Utah	#20	Smith's Ballpark • Salt Lake City, UT	L 4–11	Kibbe (3–2)	Murphy (1–1)	McCleve (3)	24–12	11–7
Apr 18	at Creighton		Charles Schwab Field • Omaha, NE	W 6–0	Susac (2–1)	Hammond (0–1)	None	25–12	
Apr 19	at Creighton		Charles Schwab Field • Omaha, NE	W 3–1	Arias Jr. (2–1)	Bergstrom (3–2)	Long (4)	26–12	
Apr 22	Arizona State		Hi Corbett Field • Tucson, AZ	W 7–6	Long (3–0)	Pivaroff (0–2)	None	27–12	12–7
Apr 23	Arizona State		Hi Corbett Field • Tucson, AZ	L 5–8	Luckham (6–2)	Murphy (1–2)	None	27–13	12–8
Apr 24	Arizona State		Hi Corbett Field • Tucson, AZ	W 14–4	Irvin (4–2)	Vander Kooi (1–1)	None	28–13	13–8
Apr 26	at New Mexico State		Presley Askew Field • Las Cruces, NM	W 15–5	Susac (3–1)	Rodriguez (1–5)	None	29–13	
Apr 28	Nevada		Hi Corbett Field • Tucson, AZ	W 6–5	Long (4–0)	Morris (4–4)	None	30–13	
Apr 29	Nevada		Hi Corbett Field • Tucson, AZ	W 7–6	Long (5–0)	Maas (0–2)	None	31–13	
Apr 30	Nevada		Hi Corbett Field • Tucson, AZ	L 0–2	Walty (5–3)	Irvin (4–3)	None	31–14	
May 1	Nevada		Hi Corbett Field • Tucson, AZ	W 8–2	Susac (4–1)	Burfield (2–3)	None	32–14	
May 3	Grand Canyon		Hi Corbett Field • Tucson, AZ	L 7–11	Reilly (6–1)	Long (5–1)	None	32–15	
May 6	at USC		Dedeaux Field • Los Angeles, CA	L 1–6	Agassi (3–1)	Nichols (5–3)	Wisch (1)	32–16	13–9
May 7	at USC		Dedeaux Field • Los Angeles, CA	W 3–2	Flanagan (4–1)	Spach (1–2)	Long (5)	33–16	14–9
May 8	at USC		Dedeaux Field • Los Angeles, CA	L 5–8	Hurley (6–1)	Orloff (1–2)	Wisch (2)	33–17	14–10
May 13	#2 Oregon State		Hi Corbett Field • Tucson, AZ	L 9–12	Ferrer (3–0)	Long (5–2)	None	33–18	14–11
May 14	#2 Oregon State		Hi Corbett Field • Tucson, AZ	W 5–2	Irvin (5–3)	Kmatz (8–1)	None	34–18	15-11
May 15	#2 Oregon State		Hi Corbett Field • Tucson, AZ	W 10–5	Barraza (2–0)	Carpenter (2–3)	None	35–18	16–11
May 19	at Oregon	#25	PK Park • Eugene, OR	L 4–10	Gordon (4–2)	Nichols (5–4)	Somers (9)	35–19	16–12
May 20	at Oregon	#25	PK Park • Eugene, OR	L 3–4	Ayon (4–3)	Long (5–3)	None	35–20	16–13
May 21	at Oregon	#25	PK Park • Eugene, OR	L 3–5	Stoffal (1–2)	Susac (4–2)	None	35–21	16–14
Pac-12 Conference Tournament
May 25	(4) Oregon	(5)	Scottsdale Stadium • Scottsdale, AZ	W 8–6	Orloff (2–2)	Gordon (4–3)	Long (6)	36–21	
May 26	(1) #3 Stanford	(5)	Scottsdale Stadium • Scottsdale, AZ	L 8–15	Pancer (1–0)	Irvin (4-4)	None	36–22	
May 27	(8) Arizona State	(5)	Scottsdale Stadium • Scottsdale, AZ	W 8–6	Flanagan (5–1)	Pivaroff (1–4)	Long (7)	37–22	
May 28	(1) #3 Stanford	(5)	Scottsdale Stadium • Scottsdale, AZ	L 4–5	Dixon (6–3)	Susac (4–3)	Mathews (7)	37–23	
NCAA Coral Gables Regional
Jun 4	(3) Ole Miss	(2)	Alex Rodriguez Park • Coral Gables, FL	L 4–7	Mallitz (1–0)	Pimental (1-1)	Johnson (10)	37–24	
Jun 5	(4) Canisius	(2)	Alex Rodriguez Park • Coral Gables, FL	W 7–5	Nichols (6–4)	Pouliot (8–3)	Flanagan (1)	38–24	
Jun 5	(1) #6 Miami	(2)	Alex Rodriguez Park • Coral Gables, FL	W 4–3	Long (6–3)	Walters (0–1)	Flanagan (2)	39–24	
Jun 5	(3) Ole Miss	(2)	Alex Rodriguez Park • Coral Gables, FL	L 6-22	Dougherty (3-3)	Orloff (2–3)	None	39–25	

=== Coral Gables Regional ===
Coral Gables Regional Teams
(1) Miami Hurricanes	(4) Canisius Golden Griffins	(2) Arizona Wildcats	(3) Ole Miss Rebels

== 2022 MLB draft ==
Player	Position	Round	Overall	MLB team
Daniel Susac	C	1	19	Oakland Athletics
Tanner O'Tremba	OF	15	466	San Francisco Giants
