= 2022 California Golden Bears baseball team =

American college baseball season

2022 California Golden Bears baseball
- Conference: Pac-12 Conference
- Record: 29–27 (14–16 Pac-12)
- Head coach: Mike Neu (5th season)
- Assistant coaches: Noah Jackson (5th season); Matt Flemer (4th season); Chad Highberger (2nd season)
- Home stadium: Evans Diamond

2022 Pac-12 Conference baseball standings
	Conf.						Overall
Team	W		L		T	PCT	W		L		T	PCT
No. 2 Stanford ‍†‍‡‍^{y}	21	–	9	–	0	.700	47	–	16	–	0	.746
No. 3 Oregon State ‍‍‍^{y}	20	–	10	–	0	.667	48	–	18	–	0	.727
No. 19 UCLA ‍‍‍^{y}	19	–	11	–	0	.633	40	–	24	–	0	.625
Oregon ‍‍‍^{y}	18	–	12	–	0	.600	36	–	25	–	0	.590
Arizona ‍‍‍^{y}	16	–	14	–	0	.533	39	–	25	–	0	.609
Washington ‍‍‍	14	–	16	–	0	.467	30	–	26	–	0	.536
California ‍‍‍	14	–	16	–	0	.467	29	–	27	–	0	.518
Arizona State ‍‍‍	13	–	17	–	0	.433	26	–	31	–	0	.456
Washington State ‍‍‍	12	–	18	–	0	.400	27	–	26	–	0	.509
Utah ‍‍‍	10	–	20	–	0	.333	26	–	27	–	1	.491
USC ‍‍‍	8	–	22	–	0	.267	25	–	28	–	0	.472
† – Conference champion ‡ – Tournament champion y – Invited to the NCAA tournament As of June 13, 2022; Rankings from D1Baseball

The 2022 California Golden Bears baseball team represented the University of California, Berkeley in the 2022 NCAA Division I baseball season. The Golden Bears played their home games at Evans Diamond as a member of the Pac-12 Conference. They were led by head coach Mike Neu, in his 5th season at Cal.

== Previous season ==
The Golden Bears finished with a record of 29–26, and 15–15 in conference play. The Golden Bears were not selected to compete in the 2021 NCAA Division I baseball tournament.

== Personnel ==
=== Roster ===
2022 California Golden Bears roster
Pitchers: 1 – Christian Becerra – Freshman; 4 – Joseph King – Junior; 5 – Connor Sullivan – Sophomore; 14 – Nick Proctor – Senior; 16 – Tucker Bougie – Freshman; 18 – Tommy Hannan – Grad. student; 19 – Steven Zobac – Junior; 21 – Andres Galan – Freshman; 22 – Sam Stoutenborough – Senior; 23 – Vaughn Mauterer – Junior; 24 – Aaron Roberts – (redshirt) Sophomore; 29 – Ben Lake – Junior; 31 – Carson Crawford – Freshman; 32 – Chris Stamos – Junior; 33 – Lucas Gather – (redshirt) Sophomore; 34 – Josh White – Junior; 35 – Ian May – Freshman; 38 – Matt Lozovoy – Junior; 40 – Henrik Reinertsen – Grad. student; 41 – Paulshawn Pasqualotto – Sophomore; 43 – Mitch Benson – Senior; 46 – Nick Sweet – Freshman; 49 – Mitchell Scott – Senior	Catchers: 6 – Cole Elvis – Senior; 9 – Dom Souto – Senior; 27 – Joey Donnelly – Freshman; 30 – Nico Button – Freshman; 47 – Caleb Lomavita – Freshman; Infielders: 2 – Keshawn Ogans – Junior; 10 – Hance Smith – Grad. student; 15 – Jack Johnston – Freshman; 16 – Tucker Bougie – Freshman; 21 – Andres Galan – Freshman; 25 – Nathan Martorella – Junior; 27 – Joey Donnelly – Freshman; 31 – Carson Crawford – Freshman; 44 – Blake Atkins – Senior	Outfielders: 3 – Trevor Tishenkel – Sophomore; 8 – Nathan Manning – Junior; 17 – Dylan Beavers – Junior; 19 – Steven Zobac – Junior; 26 – Rodney Green Jr. – Freshman; 28 – Garret Nielsen – (redshirt) Junior; 39 – Jag Burden – Sophomore

=== Coaches ===
2022 California Golden Bears baseball coaching staff
- Mike Neu – Head coach – 5th season
- Noah Jackson – Assistant coach – 5th season
- Matt Flemer – Assistant coach – 4th season
- Chad Highberger – Volunteer assistant coach – 1st season

Note: Season counter accounts for all stints at Cal.

== Schedule ==
2022 California Golden Bears game log (29–27)
Regular Season: 28–25 (Home: 16–13; Away: 9–11; Neutral: 3–1)

February: 4–3 (Home: 1–2; Away: 0–0; Neutral: 3–1)
Game	Date	Rank	Opponent	Stadium	Score	Win	Loss	Save	Attendance	Overall	Pac-12
1	February 18		vs. Houston*	Salt River Fields at Talking Stick; Scottsdale, Arizona	4–2 (10)	**Reinertsen** **(1–0)**	Cherry (0–1)	—	N/A	1–0	–
2	February 19		vs. No. 17 TCU*	Salt River Fields at Talking Stick; Scottsdale, Arizona	7–6	**Reinertsen** **(2–0)**	Thomas (0–1)	—	N/A	2–0	–
3	February 20		San Diego State*	Salt River Fields at Talking Stick; Scottsdale, Arizona	6–3	**King** **(1–0)**	Flores (0–1)	**Scott** **(1)**	N/A	3–0	–
4	February 21		Gonzaga*	Sloan Park; Mesa, Arizona	8–9	Jessee (1–0)	**Reinertsen** **(2–1)**	—	216	3–1	–
5	February 25		UIC*	Evans Diamond; Berkeley, California	2–4	Peterson (1–0)	**Mauterer** **(0–1)**	Lopez (1)	534	3–2	–
6	February 26 (1)		UIC*	Evans Diamond; Berkeley, California	12–2	**Zobac** **(1–0)**	Ingram (0–2)	**May** **(1)**	1,007	4–2	–
7	February 26 (2)		UIC*	Evans Diamond; Berkeley, California	1–6	Zahora (1–0)	**King** **(1–1)**	—	1,007	4–3	–

March: 7–10 (Home: 3–7; Away: 4–3; Neutral: N/A)
Game	Date	Rank	Opponent	Stadium	Score	Win	Loss	Save	Attendance	Overall	Pac-12
8	March 1		No. 23 Sacramento State*	Evans Diamond; Berkeley, California	6–2	**Hannan** **(1–0)**	Fleming (1–1)	—	377	5–3	–
9	March 4		at No. 10 Florida State*	Dick Howser Stadium; Tallahassee, Florida,	3–4	Scolaro (1–1)	**Roberts** **(0–1)**	—	4,737	5–4	–
10	March 5		at No. 10 Florida State*	Dick Howser Stadium; Tallahassee, Florida	4–7	Hubbart (3–0)	**Zobac** **(3–1)**	—	4,691	5–5	–
11	March 6		at No. 10 Florida State*	Dick Howser Stadium; Tallahassee, Florida	5–3 (10)	**Proctor** **(1–0)**	Whittaker (0–1)	—	4,565	6–5	–
12	March 8		Santa Clara*	Evans Diamond; Berkeley, California	6–9	Connolly (1–0)	**Stoutenborough** **(0–1)**	Kitchen (1)	352	6–6	–
13	March 11		No. 16 Arizona	Evans Diamond; Berkeley, California	9–8	**Stamos** **(1–0)**	Christian (1–1)	—	889	7–6	1–0
14	March 12		No. 16 Arizona	Evans Diamond; Berkeley, California	4–10	Irvin (2–1)	**Proctor** **(1–1)**	—	1,108	7–7	1–1
15	March 13		No. 16 Arizona	Evans Diamond; Berkeley, California	5–13	Netz (2–0)	**Reinertsen** **(2–2)**	—	1,143	7–8	1–2
16	March 15		at San Jose State*	Excite Ballpark; San Jose, California	17–5	**Becerra** **(1–0)**	Heninger (0–1)	—	417	8–8	–
17	March 18		at USC	Dedeaux Field; Los Angeles, CA	2–6	Agassi (2–0)	**White** **(0–1)**	—	409	8–9	1–3
18	March 19		at USC	Dedeaux Field; Los Angeles, CA	9–5	**Proctor** **(2–1)**	Clow (0–1)	—	573	9–9	2–3
19	March 20		at USC	Dedeaux Field; Los Angeles, CA	3–2	**May** **(1–0)**	Hurley (3–1)	**Proctor** **(1)**	1,281	10–9	3–3
20	March 22		Cal Poly*	Evans Diamond; Berkeley, California	4–14	Button (2–0)	**Sullivan** **(0–1)**	—	486	10–10	–
21	March 25		No. 6 Oregon State	Evans Diamond; Berkeley, California	4–10	Hjerpe (6–0)	**White** **(0–2)**	—	944	10–11	3–4
22	March 26		No. 6 Oregon State	Evans Diamond; Berkeley, California	8–7	**Proctor** **(3–1)**	Carpenter (1–2)	—	732	11–11	4–4
23	March 27		No. 6 Oregon State	Evans Diamond; Berkeley, California	9–13	Brown (2–0)	**Stamos** **(1–1)**	—	704	11–12	4–5
24	March 29		Saint Mary's*	Evans Diamond; Berkeley, California	5–10	Linchey (1–0)	**Galan** **(0–1)**	—	380	11–13	–

April: 9–9 (Home: 5–4; Away: 4–5; Neutral: N/A)
Game	Date	Rank	Opponent	Stadium	Score	Win	Loss	Save	Attendance	Overall	Pac-12
25	April 1		at Arizona State	Phoenix Municipal Stadium; Phoenix, Arizona	3–8	Luckham (4–1)	**White** **(0–3)**	—	2,994	11–14	4–6
26	April 2		at Arizona State	Phoenix Municipal Stadium; Phoenix, Arizona	14–7	**King** **(2–1)**	Glenn (0–4)	—	2,711	12–14	5–6
27	April 3		at Arizona State	Phoenix Municipal Stadium; Phoenix, Arizona	9–16	Webster (1–2)	**Zobac** **(1–2)**	—	2,506	12–15	5–7
28	April 5		Cal Poly*	Evans Diamond; Berkeley, California	9–3	**Stoutenborough** **(1–1)**	Scott (0–3)	—	672	13–15	–
29	April 8		Washington	Evans Diamond; Berkeley, California	4–6	Armstrong (1–0)	**White** **(0–4)**	Raeth (2)	532	13–16	5–8
30	April 9		Washington	Evans Diamond; Berkeley, California	6–3	**King** **(3–1)**	Emanuels (1–2)	—	516	14–16	6–8
31	April 10		Washington	Evans Diamond; Berkeley, California	14–5	**Stoutenborough** **(2–1)**	Bloebaum (1–2)	—	1,045	15–16	7–8
32	April 11		at Saint Mary's*	Louis Guisto Field; Moraga, California	6–0	**Bougie** **(1–0)**	Linchey (2–1)	—	114	16–16	–
33	April 15 (1)		at Washington State	Bailey-Brayton Field; Pullman, Washington	1–4	McMillan (3–3)	**May** **(1–1)**	Grillo (2)	948	16–17	7–9
34	April 15 (2)		at Washington State	Bailey-Brayton Field; Pullman, Washington	16–4	**White** **(1–4)**	Taylor (2–4)	—	857	17–17	8–9
35	April 16		at Washington State	Bailey-Brayton Field; Pullman, Washington	7–4	**Bougie** **(2–0)**	Grillo (1–1)	**Becerra** **(1)**	944	18–17	9–9
36	April 19		San Francisco*	Evans Diamond; Berkeley, California	11–14	Beck (3–2)	**Roberts** **(0–2)**	—	455	18–18	–
37	April 22		No. 13 UCLA	Evans Diamond; Berkeley, California	8–3	**Zobac** **(2–2)**	Brooks (5–4)	—	1,637	19–18	10–9
38	April 23		No. 13 UCLA	Evans Diamond; Berkeley, California	4–9	Rajcic (5–3)	**King** **(3–2)**	—	1,317	19–19	10–10
39	April 24		No. 13 UCLA	Evans Diamond; Berkeley, California	3–6	Colwell (2–0)	**Stoutenborough** **(2–2)**	—	1,791	19–20	10–11
40	April 26		Pacific*	Evans Diamond; Berkeley, California	9–8	**Becerra** **(2–0)**	Defelippi (1–2)	**Reinertsen** **(1)**	534	20–20	-
41	April 29		at No. 25 Oregon	PK Park; Eugene, Oregon	2–7	Britton	**White**	Somers	1188	20–21	10–12
42	April 30		at No. 25 Oregon	PK Park; Eugene, Oregon	3–8	Ayon	**King**	—	1043	20–22	10–13

May: 8–3 (Home: 7–0; Away: 1–3; Neutral: N/A)
Game	Date	Rank	Opponent	Stadium	Score	Win	Loss	Save	Attendance	Overall	Pac-12
43	May 1		at No. 25 Oregon	PK Park; Eugene, Oregon	9–8	**May**	Somers	**White**	1114	21–22	11–13
44	May 3		San Jose State*	Evans Diamond; Berkeley, California	10–0	**Bougie**	Thompson	—	658	22–22	–
45	May 6		at No. 11 Stanford	Sunken Diamond; Stanford, California	2–6	Williams	**Zobac**	—	2242	22–23	11–14
46	May 7		at No. 11 Stanford	Sunken Diamond; Stanford, California	7–8	Matthews	**White**	—	2634	22–24	11–15
47	May 8		at No. 11 Stanford	Sunken Diamond; Stanford, California	3–11	Uber	**Stoutenborough**	—	1725	22–25	11–16
48	May 13		New Mexico*	Evans Diamond; Berkeley, California	11–0	**Zobac**	Haley	—	308	23–25	–
49	May 14		New Mexico*	Evans Diamond; Berkeley, California	23–5	**King**	Russell	—	380	24–25	–
50	May 15		New Mexico*	Evans Diamond; Berkeley, California	8–0	**Proctor**	Still	—	580	25–25	–
51	May 19		Utah	Evans Diamond; Berkeley, California	13–1	**King**	Sox	—	530	26–25	12–16
52	May 20		Utah	Evans Diamond; Berkeley, California	18–2	**Zobac**	Harris	—	521	27–25	13–16
53	May 21		Utah	Evans Diamond; Berkeley, California	9–8	**Scott**	Whiting	—	535	28–25	14–16

Postseason (1–2)

Pac-12 Baseball Tournament (1–2)
Game	Date	Rank	Opponent	Stadium	Score	Win	Loss	Save	Attendance	Overall	Tournament
54	May 25		No. 20 UCLA	Scottsdale Stadium; Scottsdale, AZ	4–1	**White**	Proctor	—	2019	29–25	1–0
55	May 26		No. 4 Oregon State	Scottsdale Stadium; Scottsdale, AZ	1–3	Hjerpe	**Zobac**	Sebby	3174	29–26	1–1
56	May 27		No. 20 UCLA	Scottsdale Stadium; Scottsdale, AZ	7–9 (10)	Jewett	**Stoutenborough**	—	3099	29–27	1–2

- Win
- Loss
- Postponement
- Bold: Golden Bears team member
- Rankings from D1 Baseball.
- (#) Tournament seedings in parentheses.
- * indicates a non-conference game.

== Rankings ==
Ranking movements Legend: ██ Increase in ranking ██ Decrease in ranking — = Not ranked RV = Received votes
	Week																			
Poll	Pre	1	2	3	4	5	6	7	8	9	10	11	12	13	14	15	16	17	18	Final
Coaches'	—	—*																		
Baseball America	—	—																		
Collegiate Baseball^	RV	—																		
NCBWA†	RV	RV																		
D1Baseball	—	—																		

^ Collegiate Baseball ranked 40 teams in their preseason poll, but only ranked 30 teams weekly during the season.
† NCBWA ranks 30 teams in their preseason poll, but only ranks 25 teams weekly during the season.
* A new poll was not released for this week, so for comparison purposes, the previous week's ranking is inserted in this week's slot.
