= 2022 Arizona State Sun Devils baseball team =

American baseball team

2022 Arizona State Sun Devils baseball
- Conference: Pac-12 Conference
- Record: 26–32 (13–17 Pac-12)
- Head coach: Willie Bloomquist (1st season)
- Assistant coach: Mike Goff (1st season)
- Hitting coach: Travis Buck (1st season)
- Pitching coach: Sam Peraza (1st season)
- Home stadium: Phoenix Municipal Stadium

2022 Pac-12 Conference baseball standings
	Conf.						Overall
Team	W		L		T	PCT	W		L		T	PCT
No. 2 Stanford ‍†‍‡‍^{y}	21	–	9	–	0	.700	47	–	16	–	0	.746
No. 3 Oregon State ‍‍‍^{y}	20	–	10	–	0	.667	48	–	18	–	0	.727
No. 19 UCLA ‍‍‍^{y}	19	–	11	–	0	.633	40	–	24	–	0	.625
Oregon ‍‍‍^{y}	18	–	12	–	0	.600	36	–	25	–	0	.590
Arizona ‍‍‍^{y}	16	–	14	–	0	.533	39	–	25	–	0	.609
Washington ‍‍‍	14	–	16	–	0	.467	30	–	26	–	0	.536
California ‍‍‍	14	–	16	–	0	.467	29	–	27	–	0	.518
Arizona State ‍‍‍	13	–	17	–	0	.433	26	–	31	–	0	.456
Washington State ‍‍‍	12	–	18	–	0	.400	27	–	26	–	0	.509
Utah ‍‍‍	10	–	20	–	0	.333	26	–	27	–	1	.491
USC ‍‍‍	8	–	22	–	0	.267	25	–	28	–	0	.472
† – Conference champion ‡ – Tournament champion y – Invited to the NCAA tournament As of June 13, 2022; Rankings from D1Baseball

The 2022 Arizona State Sun Devils baseball team represented Arizona State University during the 2022 NCAA Division I baseball season. The Sun Devils played their home games at Phoenix Municipal Stadium as a member of the Pac-12 Conference. They were led by head coach Willie Bloomquist, in his 1st season at ASU.

== Previous season ==
The Sun Devils finished with a record of 33–22, and 16–14 in conference play. In the postseason, the Sun Devils were invited and participated in the 2021 NCAA Division I baseball tournament, where they lost to the #2 national seed Texas and Fairfield in the Austin Regional in Austin, Texas.

In the offseason, Tracy Smith was fired from his role as head coach after 7 seasons with the program. A few days later, it was announced that Willie Bloomquist was hired as the new head coach.

== Personnel ==
=== Roster ===
2022 Arizona State Sun Devils roster
Pitchers: 3 – Dom Cacchione – (redshirt) Junior; 4 – Luke La Flam – (redshirt) Junior; 6 – Kai Murphy – (redshirt) Sophomore; 10 – Christian Bodlovich – (redshirt) Sophomore; 13 – Tyler Meyer – Sophomore; 15 – Jared Glenn – Sophomore; 19 – Boyd Vander Kooi – (redshirt) Senior; 25 – Will Levine – (redshirt) Junior; 26 – Graham Osman – (redshirt) Sophomore; 31 – Josh Hansell – Sophomore; 33 – Brock Peery – Sophomore; 36 – Adam Tulloch – (redshirt) Junior; 40 – Chase Webster – Junior; 43 – Danny Marshall – (redshirt) Sophomore; 44 – Kyle Luckham – (redshirt) Junior; 45 – Andrew Lucas – (redshirt) Junior; 46 – Jacob Walker – (redshirt) Senior	Catchers: 12 – Nate Baez – (redshirt) Sophomore; 17 – Ryan Campos – Freshman; 21 – Will Rogers – Freshman; 41 – Bronson Balholm – (redshirt) Senior; Infielders: 2 – Sean McLain – (redshirt) Sophomore; 7 – Conor Davis – Grad. student; 8 – Cam Magee – Freshman; 9 – Blake Pivaroff – Sophomore; 12 – Nate Baez – (redshirt) Sophomore; 18 – Jacob Tobias – Freshman; 27 – Hunter Haas – Sophomore; 35 – Ethan Long – Sophomore; 37 – Alex Champagne – Freshman	Outfielders: 5 – Joe Lampe – (redshirt) Sophomore; 6 – Kai Murphy – (redshirt) Sophomore; 11 – Kade Higgins – Sophomore; 23 – Michael Brueser – Sophomore; 28 – Ivan Brethowr – Freshman; 32 – Trey Rucker – Freshman

=== Coaching staff ===
2022 Arizona State coaching staff
Name	Position	Seasons at Arizona State	Alma mater
Willie Bloomquist	Head coach	1	Arizona State
Mike Goff	Assistant Coach	1	UAB
Sam Peraza	Pitching Coach/Recruiting Coordinator	1	San Diego State
Travis Buck	Hitting Coach	1	Arizona State

== Schedule ==
2022 Arizona State Sun Devils game log (26–32)
Regular season: 26–32 (Home: 19–13; Away: 6–17; Neutral: 1–2)

February: 3–4
Game	Date	Rank	Opponent	Stadium	Score	Win	Loss	Save	Attendance	Overall	Pac-12
1	February 18		Dixie State*	Phoenix Municipal Stadium; Phoenix, Arizona	3–1	**Bodlovich** **(1–0)**	Holiday (0–1)	**Levine** **(1)**	3,193	1–0	–
2	February 19		Dixie State*	Phoenix Municipal Stadium; Phoenix, Arizona	6–7 (10)	Hardman (1–0)	**Cacchione** **(0–1)**	—	2,965	1–1	–
3	February 20		Dixie State*	Phoenix Municipal Stadium; Phoenix, Arizona	17–8	**Levine** **(1–0)**	Dahle (0–1)	—	2,899	2–1	–
4	February 22		Nevada*	Phoenix Municipal Stadium; Phoenix, Arizona	3–1	**Meyer** **(1–0)**	Rohlicek (0–1)	**Webster** **(1)**	2,456	3–1	–
5	February 24		BYU*	Phoenix Municipal Stadium; Phoenix, Arizona	2–4	Robison (1–0)	**Bodlovich** **(1–1)**	McLaughlin (3)	2,725	3–2	–
6	February 25		BYU*	Phoenix Municipal Stadium; Phoenix, Arizona	5–6	Cole (1–0)	**Peery** **(0–1)**	McLaughlin (4)	3,388	3–3	–
7	February 26		BYU*	Phoenix Municipal Stadium; Phoenix, Arizona	3–19	Brady (1–0)	**Hansell** **(0–1)**	—	3,872	3–4	–

March: 8–11
Game	Date	Rank	Opponent	Stadium	Score	Win	Loss	Save	Attendance	Overall	Pac-12
8	March 1		No. 4 Oklahoma State*	Phoenix Municipal Stadium; Phoenix, Arizona	5–7	Phansalkar (2–1)	**Webster** **(0–1)**	Martin (2)	3,218	3–5	–
9	March 2		No. 4 Oklahoma State*	Phoenix Municipal Stadium; Phoenix, Arizona	6–11	Root (1–0)	**Glenn** **(0–1)**	—	3,072	3–6	–
10	March 4		at San Diego State*	Tony Gwynn Stadium; San Diego, California	13–5	**Tulloch** **(1–0)**	Fondtain (1–1)	—	232	4–6	–
11	March 5		at San Diego State*	Tony Gwynn Stadium; San Diego, California	6–4	**Luckham** **(1–0)**	Sauer (1–2)	**Peery** **(1)**	556	5–6	–
12	March 6		at San Diego State*	Tony Gwynn Stadium; San Diego, California	3–4	Flores (1–1)	**Marshall** **(0–1)**	Guzman (1)	763	5–7	–
13	March 8		at UC Irvine*	Anteater Ballpark; Irvine, California	3–4	Wentworth (1–0)	**Glenn** **(0–2)**	Taylor (1)	686	5–8	–
14	March 9		at UC Irvine*	Anteater Ballpark; Irvine, California	2–3 (12)	Robinson (1–0)	**Levine** **(1–1)**	—	698	5–9	–
15	March 11		San Francisco*	Phoenix Municipal Stadium; Phoenix, Arizona	8–5	**Tulloch** **(2–0)**	Stevenson (1–1)	—	6,207	6–9	–
16	March 12		San Francisco*	Phoenix Municipal Stadium; Phoenix, Arizona	4–2	**Luckham** **(2–0)**	Lombard (2–1)	—	5,256	7–9	–
17	March 13		San Francisco*	Phoenix Municipal Stadium; Phoenix, Arizona	17–10	**Osman** **(1–0)**	Jenkins (0–1)	**Bodlovich** **(1)**	4,942	8–9	–
18	March 13		Missouri*	Phoenix Municipal Stadium; Phoenix, Arizona	4–6	Rustad (2–0)	**Webster** **(0–2)**	Lohse (1)	4,942	8–10	–
19	March 18		at No. 5 Oregon State	Goss Stadium; Corvallis, Oregon	0–21	Hjerpe (5–0)	**Tulloch** **(2–1)**	—	3,322	8–11	0–1
20	March 19		at No. 5 Oregon State	Goss Stadium; Corvallis, Oregon	2–12	Kmatz (4–0)	**Luckham** **(2–1)**	Sebby (1)	3,547	8–12	0–2
21	March 20		at No. 5 Oregon State	Goss Stadium; Corvallis, Oregon	3–1	**Bodlovich** **(2–1)**	Carpenter (1–1)	**Peery** **(3)**	3,569	9–12	1–2
22	March 22		Grand Canyon*	Phoenix Municipal Stadium; Phoenix, Arizona	5–7	Cooper-Vassalakis (1–0)	**Glenn** **(0–3)**	Reilly (4)	5,552	9–13	–
23	March 25		Washington	Phoenix Municipal Stadium; Phoenix, Arizona	12–5	**Luckham** **(3–1)**	Engman (2–3)	**Walker** **(1)**	5,232	10–13	2–2
24	March 26		Washington	Phoenix Municipal Stadium; Phoenix, Arizona	5–3	**Meyer** **(2–0)**	Kirchoff (2–1)	**Peery** **(4)**	3,103	11–13	3–2
25	March 27		Washington	Phoenix Municipal Stadium; Phoenix, Arizona	4–6 (11)	Raeth (4–0)	**Peery** **(0–2)**	Bloebaum (1)	2,737	11–14	3–3
26	March 29		at UNLV*	Las Vegas Ballpark; Summerlin South, Nevada	10–11	Neirman (1–0)	**Pivaroff** **(0–1)**	–	2,420	11–15	–

April: 9–6
Game	Date	Rank	Opponent	Stadium	Score	Win	Loss	Save	Attendance	Overall	Pac-12
27	April 1		California	Phoenix Municipal Stadium; Phoenix, Arizona	8–3	**Luckham** **(4–1)**	White (0–3)	–	2,994	12–15	4–3
28	April 2		California	Phoenix Municipal Stadium; Phoenix, Arizona	7–14	King (2–1)	**Glenn** **(0–4)**	–	2,711	12–16	4–4
29	April 3		California	Phoenix Municipal Stadium; Phoenix, Arizona	16–9	**Webster** **(1–2)**	Zobac (1–2)	–	2,506	13–16	5–4
30	April 5		No. 11 Arizona*	Phoenix Municipal Stadium; Phoenix, Arizona	10–6	**Levine** **(2–1)**	Arias Jr. (1–1)	**Pivaroff** **(1)**	3,903	14–16	–
31	April 8		at Stanford	Sunken Diamond; Stanford, California	0–8	Williams (3–1)	**Luckham** **(4–2)**	–	1,550	14–17	5–5
32	April 9		at Stanford	Sunken Diamond; Stanford, California	6–10	O'Rourke (1–3)	**Levine** **(2–2)**	Mathews (2)	1,681	14–18	5–6
33	April 10		at Stanford	Sunken Diamond; Stanford, California	10–16	Mathews (5–1)	**Webster** **(1–3)**	–	1,969	14–19	5–7
34	April 11		at Santa Clara*	Stephen Schott Stadium; Santa Clara, California	21–1	**Vander Kooi** **(1–0)**	Reelfs (3–4)	–	178	15–19	–
35	April 14		USC	Phoenix Municipal Stadium; Phoenix, Arizona	14–12	**Levine** **(3–2)**	Lambert (4–2)	**Peery** **(5)**	2,648	16–19	6–7
36	April 15		USC	Phoenix Municipal Stadium; Phoenix, Arizona	8–2	**Luckham** **(5–2)**	Stromsborg (1–3)	–	4,432	17–19	7–7
37	April 16		USC	Phoenix Municipal Stadium; Phoenix, Arizona	9–8	**Webster** **(2–3)**	Keating (2–2)	**Peery** **(6)**	2,731	18–19	8–7
38	April 19		Cal State Northridge*	Phoenix Municipal Stadium; Phoenix, Arizona	6–1	**Walker** **(1–0)**	Wilson (1–1)	–	2,203	19–19	–
39	April 22		at Arizona	Hi Corbett Field; Tucson, Arizona	6–7 (10)	Long (3–0)	**Pivaroff** **(0–2)**	–	5,663	19–20	8–8
40	April 23		at Arizona	Hi Corbett Field; Tucson, Arizona	8–5	**Luckham** **(6–2)**	Murphy (1–2)	–	6,617	20–20	9–8
41	April 24		at Arizona	Hi Corbett Field; Tucson, Arizona	4–14	Irvin (4–2)	**Vander Kooi** **(1–1)**	–	3,583	20–21	9–9
42	April 26		UNLV*	Phoenix Municipal Stadium; Phoenix, Arizona	1–9	Acosta (1–1)	**Osman** **(1–1)**	Beal (1)	2,317	20–22	9–9
43	April 29		at UCLA	Jackie Robinson Stadium; Los Angeles, California	2–19	Rajcic (6–3)	**Tulloch** **(2–2)**	–	771	20–23	9–10
44	April 30		at UCLA	Jackie Robinson Stadium; Los Angeles, California	5–7	Jewett (2–0)	**Levine** **(3–3)**	Tredwell (3)	857	20–24	9–11

May: 5–6
Game	Date	Rank	Opponent	Stadium	Score	Win	Loss	Save	Attendance	Overall Pac-12	
45	May 1		at UCLA	Jackie Robinson Stadium; Los Angeles, California	5–16	Jepp (1–0)	**Vander Kooi** **(1–2)**	–	791	20–25	9–12
46	May 6		Utah	Phoenix Municipal Stadium; Phoenix, Arizona	19–7	**Meyer** **(3–0)**	Sox (4–3)	–	2,873	21–25	10–12
47	May 7		Utah	Phoenix Municipal Stadium; Phoenix, Arizona	6–3	**Pivaroff** **(1–2)**	Ashman (2–1)	**Peery** **(7)**	2,610	22–25	11–12
48	May 8		Utah	Phoenix Municipal Stadium; Phoenix, Arizona	13–6	**Vander Kooi** **(2–2)**	Day (1–6)	–	2,064	23–25	12–12
49	May 10		at Grand Canyon*	Brazell Field; Phoenix, Arizona	6–4	**Osman** **(2–1)**	Ankeney (3–3)	**Peery** **(8)**	2,881	24–25	12–12
50	May 13		Oregon	Phoenix Municipal Stadium; Phoenix, Arizona	3–11	Gordon (3–2)	**Tulloch** **(2–3)**	–	2,695	24–26	12–13
51	May 14		Oregon	Phoenix Municipal Stadium; Phoenix, Arizona	6–4	**Luckham** **(7–2)**	Ayon (3–3)	**Peery** **(9)**	2,534	25–26	13–13
52	May 15		Oregon	Phoenix Municipal Stadium; Phoenix, Arizona	5–15	Mercado (6–2)	**Meyer** **(3–1)**	–	2,317	25–27	13–14
53	May 19		at Washington State	Bailey–Brayton Field; Pullman, Washington	0–2	Taylor (4–5)	**Luckham** **(7–3)**	–	873	25–28	13–15
54	May 20		at Washington State	Bailey–Brayton Field; Pullman, Washington	6–10	McMillan (5–5)	**Tulloch** **(2–4)**	Kaelber (7)	1,016	25–29	13–16
55	May 21		at Washington State	Bailey–Brayton Field; Pullman, Washington	3–10	Liss (3–1)	**Long** **(0–1)**	–	1,187	25–30	13–17

Pac–12 Tournament: 1–2
Game	Date	Rank	Opponent	Stadium	Score	Win	Loss	Save	Attendance	
56	May 25		Stanford	Scottsdale Stadium; Scottsdale, Arizona	3–6	Bruno (4–1)	**Pivaroff** **(1–3)**	Mathews (6)	2,044	25–31
57	May 26		Oregon	Scottsdale Stadium; Scottsdale, Arizona	4–2	**Osman** **(3–1)**	Ayon (4–4)	**Peery** **(10)**	1,682	26–31
58	May 27		Arizona	Scottsdale Stadium; Scottsdale, Arizona	6–8	Flanagan (5–1)	**Pivaroff** **(1–4)**	Long (7)	3,099	26–32

- Win
- Loss
- Postponement
- Bold: Sun Devils team member
- Rankings from D1 Baseball.
- (#) Tournament seedings in parentheses.
- * indicates a non-conference game.

== Rankings ==
Ranking movements Legend: ██ Increase in ranking ██ Decrease in ranking — = Not ranked RV = Received votes
	Week																			
Poll	Pre	1	2	3	4	5	6	7	8	9	10	11	12	13	14	15	16	17	18	Final
Coaches'	—	—*																		
Baseball America	—	—																		
Collegiate Baseball^	43	—																		
NCBWA†	RV	RV																		
D1Baseball	—	—																		

^ Collegiate Baseball ranked 40 teams in their preseason poll, but only ranked 30 teams weekly during the season.
† NCBWA ranks 30 teams in their preseason poll, but only ranks 25 teams weekly during the season.
* A new poll was not released for this week, so for comparison purposes, the previous week's ranking is inserted in this week's slot.
