= 2022 UCLA Bruins baseball team =

2022 season of the University of California, Los Angeles baseball team

2022 UCLA Bruins baseball

NCAA Auburn Regional, 2–2
- Conference: Pac-12 Conference

Ranking
- Coaches: No. 23
- CB: No. 15
- Record: 40–24 (19–11 Pac-12)
- Head coach: John Savage (18th season)
- Hitting coach: Bryant Ward (8th season)
- Home stadium: Jackie Robinson Stadium

2022 Pac-12 Conference baseball standings
	Conf.						Overall
Team	W		L		T	PCT	W		L		T	PCT
No. 2 Stanford ‍†‍‡‍^{y}	21	–	9	–	0	.700	47	–	16	–	0	.746
No. 3 Oregon State ‍‍‍^{y}	20	–	10	–	0	.667	48	–	18	–	0	.727
No. 19 UCLA ‍‍‍^{y}	19	–	11	–	0	.633	40	–	24	–	0	.625
Oregon ‍‍‍^{y}	18	–	12	–	0	.600	36	–	25	–	0	.590
Arizona ‍‍‍^{y}	16	–	14	–	0	.533	39	–	25	–	0	.609
Washington ‍‍‍	14	–	16	–	0	.467	30	–	26	–	0	.536
California ‍‍‍	14	–	16	–	0	.467	29	–	27	–	0	.518
Arizona State ‍‍‍	13	–	17	–	0	.433	26	–	31	–	0	.456
Washington State ‍‍‍	12	–	18	–	0	.400	27	–	26	–	0	.509
Utah ‍‍‍	10	–	20	–	0	.333	26	–	27	–	1	.491
USC ‍‍‍	8	–	22	–	0	.267	25	–	28	–	0	.472
† – Conference champion ‡ – Tournament champion y – Invited to the NCAA tournament As of June 13, 2022; Rankings from D1Baseball

The 2022 UCLA Bruins baseball team represented the University of California, Los Angeles during the 2022 NCAA Division I baseball season. The Bruins played their home games at Jackie Robinson Stadium as a member of the Pac-12 Conference. They were led by head coach John Savage, in his 18th season at UCLA.

== Previous season ==
The Bruins finished with a record of 37–20, and 18–12 in conference play. In the postseason, the Bruins were invited and participated in the 2021 NCAA Division I baseball tournament, where they lost to North Carolina and the #8 national seed Texas Tech in the Lubbock Regional in Lubbock, Texas.

== Preseason ==
Long time assistant coach Rex Peters has retired after 29 years of coaching baseball, with the last 10 years at UCLA. To fill the vacancy on John Savage's staff, Niko Gallego was promoted from volunteer assistant coach to assistant and former UCLA pitcher David Berg took over as volunteer assistant coach. Berg played an important part as a member of the Bruins' 2013 College World Series championship team.

== Personnel ==
=== Roster ===
2022 UCLA Bruins roster
Pitchers: 8 – Max Rajcic – Sophomore; 10 – Nate Leibold – Freshman; 12 – Gage Jump – Freshman; 14 – Charles Harrison – Junior; 19 – Jared Karros – Junior; 20 – Josh Alger – Freshman; 25 – Thatcher Hurd – Freshman; 27 – Jack Filby – Senior; 28 – James Hepp – Freshman; 30 – Alonzo Tredwell – Freshman; 31 – Chris Aldrich – (redshirt) Freshman; 32 – Josh Hahn – Junior; 33 – Jake Saum – Junior; 34 – Jake Brooks – Sophomore; 35 – Luke Jewett – Freshman; 40 – Ethan Flanagan – Freshman; 43 – Daniel Colwell – Senior; 51 – Caedon Kottinger – Sophomore; 55 – Kelly Austin – (redshirt) Sophomore	Catchers: 9 – Darius Perry – Junior; 17 – Jack Holman – Freshman; 36 – Tommy Beres – (redshirt) Sophomore; Infielders: 1 – Cody Schrier – Freshman; 3 – Ethan Gourson – Freshman; 5 – Daylen Reyes – Sophomore; 6 – Michael Curialle – Junior; 7 – Bryce Grudzielanek – Freshman; 11 – Jake Moberg – Senior; 27 – Jack Filby – Senior; 37 – Eli Paton – (redshirt) Freshman; 44 – Kyle Karros – Sophomore; 45 – Alex Fernandes – Freshman	Outfielders: 4 – Nick McLain – Freshman; 6 – Michael Curialle – Junior; 15 – Kenny Oyama – Grad. student; 16 – Emanuel Dean – (redshirt) Sophomore; 18 – Carson Yates – Sophomore; 21 – JonJon Vaughns – Sophomore; 24 – Malakhi Knight – Freshman; 32 – Josh Hahn – Junior; 38 – Jake Palmer – Grad. student

=== Coaches ===
2022 UCLA Bruins baseball coaching staff
- John Savage – Head coach – 18th season
- Bryant Ward – Assistant coach – 7th season
- Niko Gallego – Assistant coach – 8th season
- David Berg – Volunteer assistant coach – 4th season

Note: Season counter accounts for all stints at UCLA.

== Schedule ==
2022 UCLA Bruins game log (38–22)
Regular season: 35–20 (Home: 22–9; Away: 11–10; Neutral: 2–1)

February: 5–3
Game	Date	Rank	Opponent	Stadium	Score	Win	Loss	Save	Attendance	Overall	Pac-12
1	February 18		Cal State Northridge*	Jackie Robinson Stadium; Los Angeles, California	9–2	**Brooks** (1–0)	Traxel (0–1)	—	1,005	1–0	–
2	February 19		Cal State Northridge*	Jackie Robinson Stadium; Los Angeles, California	4–6	Sodersten (1–0)	**Rajcic** (0–1)	Schriever (1)	650	1–1	–
3	February 20		Cal State Northridge*	Jackie Robinson Stadium; Los Angeles, California	5–3 (13)	**Saum** (1–0)	Braun (0–1)	—	805	2–1	–
4	February 22		Pepperdine*	Jackie Robinson Stadium; Los Angeles, California	5–7	Baird (2–0)	**Harrison** (0–1)	—	300	2–2	–
5	February 23		Omaha*	Jackie Robinson Stadium; Los Angeles, California	4–9	Posch (1–0)	**Harrison** (0–2)	—	280	2–3	–
6	February 25		UC Riverside*	Jackie Robinson Stadium; Los Angeles, California	3–1	**Brooks** (2–0)	Jacobs (0–1)	**Tredwell** (1)	370	3–3	–
7	February 26		UC Riverside*	Jackie Robinson Stadium; Los Angeles, California	12–0	**Rajcic** (1–1)	Magrisi (0–2)	—	500	4–3	–
8	February 27		UC Riverside*	Jackie Robinson Stadium; Los Angeles, California	2–1	**Tredwell** (1–0)	Turner (0–1)	—	400	5–3	–

March: 11–5
Game	Date	Rank	Opponent	Stadium	Score	Win	Loss	Save	Attendance	Overall	Pac-12
9	March 1		No. 25 Long Beach State*	Jackie Robinson Stadium; Los Angeles, California	3–0	**Hurd** (1–0)	Carabajal (0–1)	**Flanagan** (1)	526	6–3	–
10	March 4		vs. Baylor*	Minute Maid Park; Houston, Texas,	1–2	Thomas (2–1)	**Brooks** (2–1)	Marriott (1)	16,515	6–4	–
11	March 5		vs. Oklahoma*	Minute Maid Park; Houston, Texas	15–3 (7)	**Flanagan** (1–0)	Sandlin (1–2)	—	24,787	7–4	–
12	March 6		vs. No. 1 Texas*	Minute Maid Park; Houston, Texas	5–1	**Austin** (1–0)	Johnson (0–1)	**Tredwell** (2)	12,577	8–4	–
13	March 8		Cal State Fullerton*	Jackie Robinson Stadium; Los Angeles, California	5–4	**Flanagan** (2–0)	Howitt (0–2)	—	369	9–4	–
14	March 11		USC; Rivalry	Jackie Robinson Stadium; Los Angeles, California	4–7	Lambert (2–0)	**Brooks** (2–2)	Clow (1)	857	9–5	0–1
15	March 12		USC; Rivalry	Jackie Robinson Stadium; Los Angeles, California	11–2	**Rajcic** (2–1)	Stromsborg (1–1)	—	1,655	10–5	1–1
16	March 13		USC; Rivalry	Jackie Robinson Stadium; Los Angeles, California	3–6	Hurley (3–0)	**Austin** (1–1)	Keating (2)	1,692	10–6	1–2
17	March 18		Harvard*	Jackie Robinson Stadium; Los Angeles, California	25–2	**Brooks** (3–2)	Stone (1–2)	—	487	11–6	–
18	March 19		Harvard*	Jackie Robinson Stadium; Los Angeles, California	0–5	Williamson (2–1)	**Rajcic** (2–2)	—	632	11–7	–
19	March 20		Harvard*	Jackie Robinson Stadium; Los Angeles, California	3–2 (11)	**Jewett** (1–0)	Jacobsen (1–2)	—	787	12–7	–
20	March 22		at Loyola Marymount*	George C. Page Stadium; Los Angeles, California	9–5	**Jump** (1–0)	Galicia (0–3)	—	536	13–7	–
21	March 25		at No. 11 Arizona; Rivalry	Hi Corbett Field; Tucson, Arizona	10–2	**Brooks** (4–2)	Nichols (3–1)	—	3,524	14–7	2–2
22	March 26		at No. 11 Arizona; Rivalry	Hi Corbett Field; Tucson, Arizona	2–4	Irvin (3–1)	**Rajcic** (2–3)	Christian (3)	3,890	14–8	2–3
23	March 27		at No. 11 Arizona; Rivalry	Hi Corbett Field; Tucson, Arizona	7–3	**Hurd** (2–0)	Netz (2–1)	—	3,003	15–8	3–3
24	March 29		UC Santa Barbara*	Jackie Robinson Stadium; Los Angeles, California	7–2	**Saum** (2–0)	Callahan (1–1)	—	440	16–8	–

April: 13–5
Game	Date	Rank	Opponent	Stadium	Score	Win	Loss	Save	Attendance	Overall	Pac-12
25	April 1		No. 21 Oregon	Jackie Robinson Stadium; Los Angeles, California	5–2	**Brooks** (5–2)	Gordon (1–1)	**Jump** (1)	657	17–8	4–3
26	April 2		No. 21 Oregon	Jackie Robinson Stadium; Los Angeles, California	4–3	**Rajcic** (3–3)	Ayon (2–1)	**Austin** (1)	825	18–8	5–3
27	April 3		No. 21 Oregon	Jackie Robinson Stadium; Los Angeles, California	5–4	**Saum** (3–0)	Somers (1–1)	**Jump** (2)	1,144	19–8	6–3
28	April 5	No. 15	Loyola Marymount*	Jackie Robinson Stadium; Los Angeles, California	5–4 (11)	**Aldrich** (1–0)	Hackman (1–2)	—	371	20–8	–
29	April 8	No. 15	at Utah	Smith's Ballpark; Salt Lake City, Utah	6–5 (10)	**Austin** (2–1)	Whiting (2–1)	—	1,315	21–8	7–3
30	April 9	No. 15	at Utah	Smith's Ballpark; Salt Lake City, Utah	4–3	**Rajcic** (4–3)	Harris (1–1)	**Flanagan** (2)	1,367	22–8	8–3
31	April 10	No. 15	at Utah	Smith's Ballpark; Salt Lake City, Utah	6–7	Schramm (3–0)	**Aldrich** (1–1)	McCleve (2)	967	22–9	8–4
32	April 12	No. 12	at Pepperdine*	Eddy D. Field Stadium; Malibu, California	9–7	**Colwell** (1–0)	Georges (0–1)	**Aldrich** (1)	450	23–9	–
33	April 14	No. 12	No. 22 Stanford	Jackie Robinson Stadium; Los Angeles, California	1–9	Williams (4–1)	**Brooks** (5–3)	—	641	23–10	8–5
34	April 15	No. 12	No. 22 Stanford	Jackie Robinson Stadium; Los Angeles, California	5–4	**Flanagan** (3–0)	O'Rourke (1–4)	—	1,494	24–10	9–5
35	April 16	No. 12	No. 22 Stanford	Jackie Robinson Stadium; Los Angeles, California	0–11	Mathews (6–1)	**Jump** (1–1)	—	1,334	24–11	9–6
36	April 19	No. 13	at UC Santa Barbara*	Caesar Uyesaka Stadium; Santa Barbara, California	14–4	**Austin** (3–1)	Welch (2–2)	—	512	25–11	–
37	April 22	No. 13	at California	Evans Diamond; Berkeley, California	3–8	Zobac (2–2)	**Brooks** (5–4)	—	1,637	25–12	9–7
38	April 23	No. 13	at California	Evans Diamond; Berkeley, California	9–4	**Rajcic** (5–3)	King (3–2)	—	1,317	26–12	10–7
39	April 24	No. 13	at California	Evans Diamond; Berkeley, California	6–3	**Colwell** (2–0)	Stoutenborough (2–2)	—	1,791	27–12	11–7
40	April 26	No. 13	UC Irvine*	Jackie Robinson Stadium; Los Angeles, California	2–4	King (1–1)	**Harrison** (0–3)	Taylor (5)	383	27–13	–
41	April 29	No. 13	Arizona State	Jackie Robinson Stadium; Los Angeles, California	19–2	**Rajcic** (6–3)	Tulloch (2–2)	—	771	28–13	12–7
42	April 30	No. 13	Arizona State	Jackie Robinson Stadium; Los Angeles, California	7–5	**Jewett** (2–0)	Levine (3–3)	**Tredwell** (3)	857	29–13	13–7

May: 6–7
Game	Date	Rank	Opponent	Stadium	Score	Win	Loss	Save	Attendance	Overall	Pac-12
43	May 1	No. 13	Arizona State	Jackie Robinson Stadium; Los Angeles, California	16–5	**Hepp** (1–0)	Vander Kooi (1–2)	**Jewett** (1)	791	30–13	14–7
44	May 3	No. 8	at Long Beach State*	Blair Field; Long Beach, California	3–4	Carabajal (1–1)	**Hepp** (1–1)	—	1,786	30–14	–
45	May 7 (DH)	No. 8	at Washington	Husky Ballpark; Seattle, Washington	1–7	Engman (3–5)	**Rajcic** (6–4)	—	1,217	30–15	14–8
46	May 7 (DH)	No. 8	at Washington	Husky Ballpark; Seattle, Washington	3–4	Matter (1–2)	**Tredwell** (1–1)	—	890	30–16	14–9
47	May 8	No. 8	at Washington	Husky Ballpark; Seattle, Washington	4–5	Emanuels (2–4)	**Jewett** (2–1)	Velazquez (3)	867	30–17	14–10
48	May 10	No. 23	at Cal State Fullerton*	Goodwin Field; Fullerton, California	2–9	Gil (3–1)	**Colwell** (2–1)	—	1,289	30–18	–
49	May 13	No. 24	Washington State	Jackie Robinson Stadium; Los Angeles, California	4–0	**Rajcic** (7–4)	McMillan (4–5)	—	722	31–18	15–10
50	May 14	No. 24	Washington State	Jackie Robinson Stadium; Los Angeles, California	10–1	**Harrison** (1–3)	Taylor (3–5)	—	713	32–18	16–10
51	May 15	No. 24	Washington State	Jackie Robinson Stadium; Los Angeles, California	8–7	**Tredwell** (2–1)	Grillo (2–3)	—	784	33–18	17–10
52	May 17	No. 23	at UC Irvine*	Anteater Ballpark; Irvine, California	1–8	Antone (2–0)	**Colwell** (2–2)	—	1,580	33–19	–
53	May 19	No. 23	at No. 2 Oregon State	Goss Stadium at Coleman Field; Corvallis, Oregon	4–1	**Rajcic** (8–4)	Hjerpe (9–2)	**Tredwell** (4)	3,718	34–19	18–10
54	May 20	No. 23	at No. 2 Oregon State	Goss Stadium at Coleman Field; Corvallis, Oregon	7–4	**Harrison** (2–3)	Townsend (2–1)	**Tredwell** (5)	4,128	35–19	19–10
55	May 21	No. 23	at No. 2 Oregon State	Goss Stadium at Coleman Field; Corvallis, Oregon	3–9	Pfennigs (3–0)	**Austin** (3–2)	—	4,275	35–20	19–11

Postseason: 5–4 (Home: 0–0; Away: 0–0; Neutral: 5–4)

2022 Pac–12 tournament: 3–2
Game	Date	Rank	Opponent	Stadium	Score	Win	Loss	Save	Attendance	Overall	P12T
56	May 25	No. 20 (3)	vs. (6) California	Scottsdale Stadium; Scottsdale, Arizona	1–4	White (2–6)	**Harrison** (2–4)	—	2,019	35–21	0–1
57	May 26	No. 20 (3)	vs. (7) Washington	Scottsdale Stadium; Scottsdale, Arizona	14–8	**Austin** (4–2)	Matter (2–3)	**Tredwell** (6)	1,682	36–21	1–1
58	May 27	No. 20 (3)	vs. (6) California	Scottsdale Stadium; Scottsdale, Arizona	9–7 (10)	**Jewett** (3–1)	Stoutenborough (2–4)	—	3,099	37–21	2–1
59	May 28	No. 20 (3)	vs. No. 4 (2) Oregon State	Scottsdale Stadium; Scottsdale, Arizona	25–22 (10)	**Tredwell** (3–1)	Brown (4–1)	—	3,321	38–21	3–1
60	May 28	No. 20 (3)	vs. No. 4 (2) Oregon State	Scottsdale Stadium; Scottsdale, Arizona	7–8	Ferrer (4–0)	**Austin** (4–3)	—	3,321	38–22	3–2

NCAA Auburn Regional: 2–2
Game	Date	Rank	Opponent	Stadium	Score	Win	Loss	Save	Attendance	Overall	NCAAT
61	June 3	(2) No. 19	vs. (3) Florida State	Plainsman Park; Auburn, Alabama	3–5	Messick (7–5)	**Rajcic (8–5)**	Hare (4)	3,714	38–23	0–1
62	June 4	(2) No. 19	vs. (4) Southeastern Louisiana	Plainsman Park; Auburn, Alabama	16–2	**Saum (4–0)**	Landry (3–6)	—	3,218	39–23	1–1
63	June 5	(2) No. 19	vs. (3) Florida State	Plainsman Park; Auburn, Alabama	2–1	**Tredwell (4–1)**	Hare (1–4)	—	1,000	40–23	2–1
64	June 5	(2) No. 19	vs. (1) No. 25 Auburn	Plainsman Park; Auburn, Alabama	4–11	Barnett (3–2)	**Hepp (1–2)**	—	3,346	40–24	2–2

- Win
- Loss
- Postponement
- Bold: Bruins team member
- Rankings from D1 Baseball.
- (#) Tournament seedings in parentheses.
- * indicates a non-conference game.

== Rankings ==
Ranking movements Legend: ██ Increase in ranking ██ Decrease in ranking — = Not ranked RV = Received votes
	Week																			
Poll	Pre	1	2	3	4	5	6	7	8	9	10	11	12	13	14	15	16	17	18	Final
Coaches'	24	24*	RV	25	RV	—	RV	17	13	14	14	8	24	23	22	25				
Baseball America	22	21	23	15	—	—	—	18	13	16	14	9	22	22	18	19				
Collegiate Baseball^	18	21	27	24	—	—	25	12	9	12	12	6	15	14	13	13				
NCBWA†	21	23	25	22	RV	RV	RV	19	13	15	12	8	20	25	21	16				
D1Baseball	—	—	—	—	—	—	—	15	12	13	13	8	23	23	20	19				

^ Collegiate Baseball ranked 40 teams in their preseason poll, but only ranked 30 teams weekly during the season.
† NCBWA ranks 30 teams in their preseason poll, but only ranks 25 teams weekly during the season.
* A new poll was not released for this week, so for comparison purposes, the previous week's ranking is inserted in this week's slot.

== 2022 MLB draft ==
UCLA had an NCAA-High ten players selected in the 2022 MLB draft.

Player	Position	Round	Overall	MLB team
Max Rajcic	RHP	6	187	St. Louis Cardinals
Michael Curialle	UT	12	367	St. Louis Cardinals
Jared Karros	RHP	16	495	Los Angeles Dodgers
