= Willie Bloomquist =

American baseball player (born 1977)

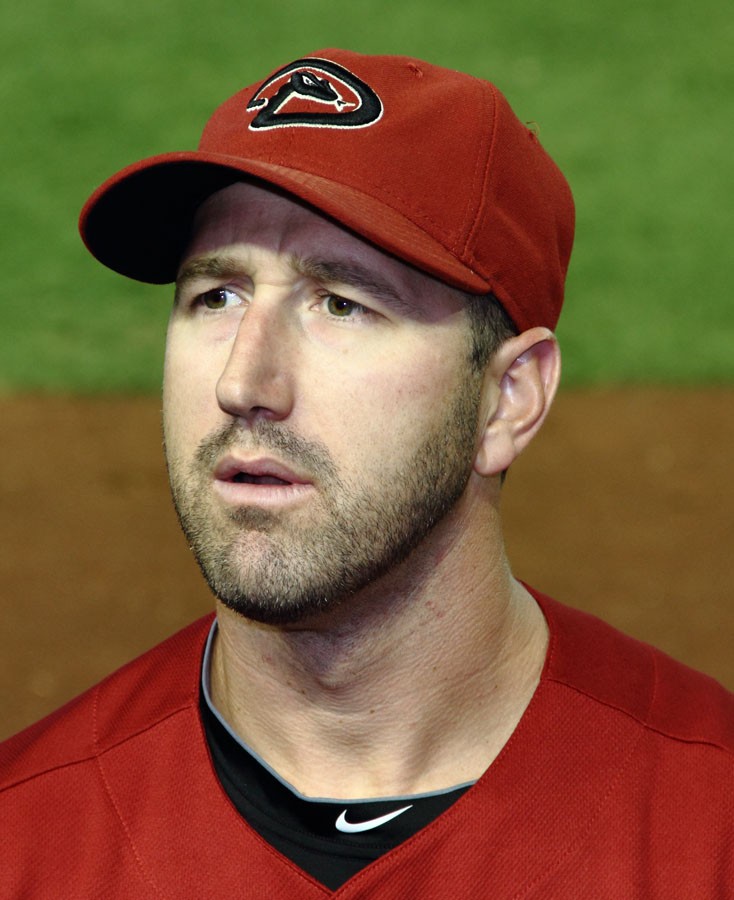
- Bloomquist with the Arizona Diamondbacks in 2011
- Utility player
- Born: November 27, 1977 (age 48); Bremerton, Washington, U.S.
- Batted: Right Threw: Right

MLB debut
- September 1, 2002, for the Seattle Mariners

Last MLB appearance
- June 28, 2015, for the Seattle Mariners

MLB statistics
- Batting average: .269
- Home runs: 18
- Runs batted in: 225
- Stats at Baseball Reference

Teams
- Seattle Mariners (2002–2008); Kansas City Royals (2009–2010); Cincinnati Reds (2010); Arizona Diamondbacks (2011–2013); Seattle Mariners (2014–2015)
Coaching career
Current position
Title	Head coach
Team	Arizona State
Conference	Big 12
Record	165–126
Annual salary	$390,000
Biographical details
Education	Arizona State
Coaching career (HC unless noted)
2022–present	Arizona State
Head coaching record
Overall	165–126
Tournaments	NCAA: 3–4
Accomplishments and honors
Awards
Pac-10 Player of the Year (1999); Baseball America All-American (1999); ASU On Deck Circle Most Valuable Player (1999)

William Paul Bloomquist (/ˈbluːmkwɪst/; born November 27, 1977) is an American baseball coach and former utility player, who is the current head baseball coach of the Arizona State Sun Devils. He played college baseball at Arizona State for coach Pat Murphy from 1997 to 1999 and played in Major League Baseball (MLB) for 14 seasons from 2002 to 2015. In 2021, he returned to his alma mater, Arizona State.

The Seattle Mariners selected Bloomquist in the third round of the 1999 MLB draft. He played 14 years primarily an outfielder and shortstop, with Seattle from 2002 to 2008, the Kansas City Royals from 2009 to 2010, the Cincinnati Reds in 2010, the Arizona Diamondbacks from 2011 to 2013 before returning to Seattle from 2014 to 2015.

== Early baseball career ==
=== High school ===
Bloomquist was All-State and all-league MVP in baseball at South Kitsap High School in Port Orchard, Washington and was an eighth round pick in 1996 MLB draft. He was a high school teammate with future MLB player Jason Ellison. Bloomquist also played quarterback for South Kitsap, which won the state AAA football championship his junior year.

=== College ===
Bloomquist played college baseball at Arizona State University. In 1998, he tied a College World Series single-game record with five hits in a game. He was named the Pac-10 Player of the Year in 1999 and was named first-team All-American by Baseball America. He finished his college career with a .394 batting average over three seasons and was named the ASU On Deck Circle Most Valuable Player.

== Professional career ==
=== Seattle Mariners ===
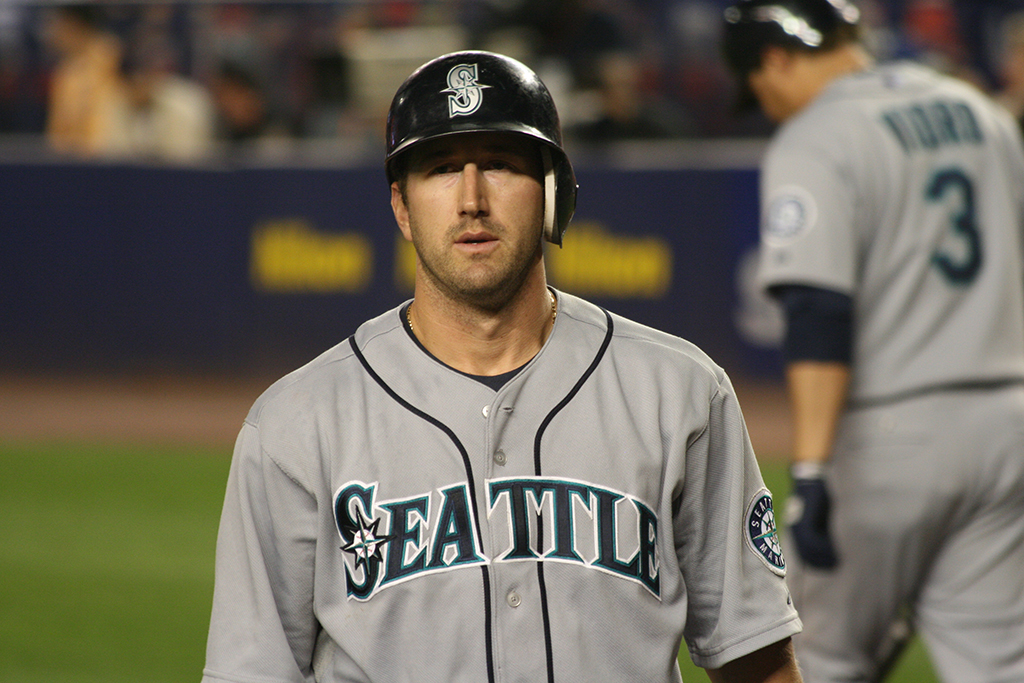
Bloomquist with the Seattle Mariners in 2008

Bloomquist was drafted out of South Kitsap High School in Port Orchard, Washington by the Seattle Mariners in the eighth round (237th overall) of the 1996 MLB draft, but was not signed. He was drafted again by the Mariners out of Arizona State University in the third round (95th overall) of the 1999 MLB draft and signed.

The Mariners signed Bloomquist to a contract extension through the 2008 season worth $1,875,000, in 2006. On June 15, 2007, he hit an inside-the-park home run in Minute Maid Park. On June 26, 2007, Bloomquist hit a lead-off home run in the second inning—on what was his 1,000th career at-bat.

=== Kansas City Royals ===
On January 9, 2009, Bloomquist signed a two-year deal with the Kansas City Royals. He played in 197 games with the Royals over parts of 2 seasons, hitting .265.

=== Cincinnati Reds ===
On September 13, 2010, Bloomquist was traded to the Cincinnati Reds for a player to be named later, or cash. In 11 games with the Reds, he hit .333.

=== Arizona Diamondbacks ===
On January 18, 2011, Bloomquist signed a one-year contract with the Arizona Diamondbacks. He hit .266 in 97 games with the Diamondbacks in 2011 and re-signed with the team after the season.

=== Second stint with Mariners ===
On December 5, 2013, Bloomquist signed a two-year deal to return to the Seattle Mariners. On July 2, 2015, Bloomquist was designated for assignment, and shortstop Chris Taylor (baseball) called up from the Triple-A Tacoma Rainiers to take his roster spot.

On March 11, 2016, Bloomquist announced his retirement on Twitter.

== Coaching career ==
On June 11, 2021, Bloomquist was named the new head coach of the Arizona State Sun Devils baseball team.

=== Head coaching record ===
Record table
Season	Team	Overall	Conference	Standing	Postseason
Arizona State Sun Devils (Pac-12 Conference) (2022–2024)
2022	Arizona State	26–32	13–17	8th	Pac-12 Tournament
2023	Arizona State	32–23	16–13	5th	Pac-12 Tournament
2024	Arizona State	32–26	17–13	5th	Pac-12 Tournament
Arizona State:					
Arizona State Sun Devils (Big 12 Conference) (2025–present)
2025	Arizona State	36–24	18–12	T-4th	NCAA Regional
2026	Arizona State	39–21	19–11	T-3rd	NCAA Regional
Arizona State:		165–126			
Total:		165–126			
National champion Postseason invitational champion Conference regular season champion Conference regular season and conference tournament champion Division regular season champion Division regular season and conference tournament champion Conference tournament champion

== Personal life ==
Bloomquist is married and has four daughters, Natalie, Ava, Layla and Sydney. He is Roman Catholic.
