= 2022 Oregon Ducks baseball team =

American college baseball season

2022 Oregon Ducks baseball

Louisville Regional, 1–2
- Conference: Pac-12 Conference
- CB: No. NR
- Record: 31–21 (15–12 Pac-12)
- Head coach: Mark Wasikowski (3rd season)
- Assistant coach: Marcus Hinkle (3rd season)
- Hitting coach: Jack Marder (3rd Season)
- Pitching coach: Jake Angier (3rd season)
- Home stadium: PK Park

2022 Pac-12 Conference baseball standings
	Conf.						Overall
Team	W		L		T	PCT	W		L		T	PCT
No. 2 Stanford ‍†‍‡‍^{y}	21	–	9	–	0	.700	47	–	16	–	0	.746
No. 3 Oregon State ‍‍‍^{y}	20	–	10	–	0	.667	48	–	18	–	0	.727
No. 19 UCLA ‍‍‍^{y}	19	–	11	–	0	.633	40	–	24	–	0	.625
Oregon ‍‍‍^{y}	18	–	12	–	0	.600	36	–	25	–	0	.590
Arizona ‍‍‍^{y}	16	–	14	–	0	.533	39	–	25	–	0	.609
Washington ‍‍‍	14	–	16	–	0	.467	30	–	26	–	0	.536
California ‍‍‍	14	–	16	–	0	.467	29	–	27	–	0	.518
Arizona State ‍‍‍	13	–	17	–	0	.433	26	–	31	–	0	.456
Washington State ‍‍‍	12	–	18	–	0	.400	27	–	26	–	0	.509
Utah ‍‍‍	10	–	20	–	0	.333	26	–	27	–	1	.491
USC ‍‍‍	8	–	22	–	0	.267	25	–	28	–	0	.472
† – Conference champion ‡ – Tournament champion y – Invited to the NCAA tournament As of June 13, 2022; Rankings from D1Baseball

The 2022 Oregon Ducks baseball team represented University of Oregon in the 2022 NCAA Division I baseball season. The Ducks played their home games at PK Park and were members of the Pac-12 Conference. The team is coached by Mark Wasikowski in his 3rd season at Oregon.

== Preseason ==
The Ducks entered the season ranked in the Top-25 by Collegiate Baseball and were picked to finish fifth in the Pac-12 preseason coaches poll.

== Schedule and results ==
Legend
	Oregon win
	Oregon loss
	Postponement/Tie
**Bold**	Oregon team member
Rank	D1 Baseball

2022 Oregon Ducks baseball game log
Regular season
February (5–3)

Date	Opponent	Rank	Site/stadium	Score	Win	Loss	Save	Overall record	Pac12 record
Feb 18	at San Diego*		Fowler Park • San Diego, CA	1–11	Rennie (1–0)	**Maier (0–1)**	None	0–1	
Feb 19	at San Diego*		Fowler Park • San Diego, CA	4–10	Mautz (1–0)	**Mosiello (0–1)**	Hyde (1)	0–2	
Feb 20	at San Diego*		Fowler Park • San Diego, CA	4–5	Thurman (1–0)	**Ciuffetelli (0–1)**	Romero (1)	0–3	
Feb 21	at San Diego*		Fowler Park • San Diego, CA	21–11	**Britton (1–0)**	Frize (0–1)	None	1–3	
Feb 25	vs. St. John's*		PK Park • Eugene, OR	23–5	**Maier (1–1)**	Murphy (0–1)	None	2–3	
Feb 26	vs. St. John's*		PK Park • Eugene, OR	16–3	**Mosiello (1–1)**	Adams (0–1)	**Gordon (1)**	3–3	
Feb 27	vs. St. John's*		PK Park • Eugene, OR	13–1	**Ayon (1–0)**	McCarthy (0–1)	None	4–3	
Feb 28	vs. St. John's*		PK Park • Eugene, OR	6–0	**Brandenburg (1–0)**	Bianchi (0–1)	None	5–3	

March (13–4)

Date	Opponent	Rank	Site/stadium	Score	Win	Loss	Save	Overall record	Pac12 record
Mar 4	vs. UC Santa Barbara*		PK Park • Eugene, OR	3–2	**Somers (1–0)**	Harvey (0–1)	None	6–3	
Mar 5	vs. UC Santa Barbara*		PK Park • Eugene, OR	4–3	**Ayon (2–0)**	Gutierrez (1–1)	None	7–3	
Mar 5	vs. UC Santa Barbara*		PK Park • Eugene, OR	5–4	Hattenbach (1–0)	**Sloan (0–1)**	Ager (1)	7–4	
Mar 6	vs. UC Santa Barbara*		PK Park • Eugene, OR	7–5	Rice (2–0)	**Ciuffetelli (0–2)**	Harvey (2)	7–5	
Mar 8	vs. Portland*		PK Park • Eugene, OR	18–2	**Hughes (1–0)**	Gillis (1–1)	None	8–5	
Mar 11	at No. 5 Stanford		Klein Field at Sunken Diamond • Stanford, CA	4–3	**Churby (1–0)**	O'Rourke (0–2)	**Somers (1)**	9–5	1–0
Mar 12	at No. 5 Stanford		Klein Field at Sunken Diamond • Stanford, CA	16–13	**Britton (2–0)**	Montgomery (0–1)	None	10–5	2–0
Mar 13	at No. 5 Stanford		Klein Field at Sunken Diamond • Stanford, CA	10–6	Dowd (3–0)	**Brandenburg (1–1)**	None	10–6	2–1
Mar 18	vs. Utah		PK Park • Eugene, OR	11–4	**Mercado (1–0)**	Sox (2–1)	None	11–6	3–1
Mar 19	vs. Utah		PK Park • Eugene, OR	8–6	**Dallas (1–0)**	Kibbe (2–2)	**Somers (2)**	12–6	4–1
Mar 20	vs. Utah		PK Park • Eugene, OR	7–2	**Mercado (2–0)**	Day (1–2)	None	13–6	5–1
Mar 22	at No. 23 Gonzaga*		Washington Trust Field • Spokane, WA	9–5	**Mercado (3–0)**	Mcgee (0–1)	None	14–6	5–1
Mar 25	vs. USC		PK Park • Eugene, OR	9–7	**Gordon (1–0)**	Agassi (2–1)	**Somers (3)**	15–6	6–1
Mar 26	vs. USC		PK Park • Eugene, OR	5–6	Lambert (3–0)	**Dallas (1–1)**	Keating (3)	15–7	6–2
Mar 27	vs. USC		PK Park • Eugene, OR	7–6	**Sabia (1–0)**	Lambert (3–1)	**Somers (4)**	16–7	7–2
Mar 29	vs. San Francisco*	21	PK Park • Eugene, OR	15–5	**Ciuffetelli (1–2)**	Lombard (2–3)	**Britton (1)**	17–7	7–2
Mar 30	vs. San Francisco*	21	PK Park • Eugene, OR	4–3	**Dallas (2–1)**	Lepe (0–1)	None	18–7	7–2

April (10–7)

Date	Opponent	Rank	Site/stadium	Score	Win	Loss	Save	Overall record	Pac12 record
Apr 1	at UCLA	21	Jackie Robinson Stadium • Los Angeles, CA	2–3	Brooks (5–2)	**Gordon (1–1)**	Jump (1)	18–8	7–3
Apr 2	at UCLA	21	Jackie Robinson Stadium • Los Angeles, CA	3–4	Rajcic (3–3)	**Ayon (2–1)**	Austin (1)	18–9	7–4
Apr 3	at UCLA	21	Jackie Robinson Stadium • Los Angeles, CA	4–5	Saum (3–0)	**Somers (1–1)**	Jump (2)	18–10	7–5
Apr 8	vs. Ball State*		PK Park • Eugene, OR	13–7	**Dallas (3–1)**	Brown (1–1)	None	19–10	7–5
Apr 9	vs. Ball State*		PK Park • Eugene, OR	2–3	Klein (2–1)	**Somers (1–2)**	None	19–11	7–5
Apr 9	vs. Ball State*		PK Park • Eugene, OR	10–4	**Mercado (4–0)**	Johnson (4–2)	None	20–11	7–5
Apr 10	vs. Ball State*		PK Park • Eugene, OR	7–6	**Somers (2–2)**	Klein (2–2)	None	21–11	7–5
Apr 14	at Washington		Husky Ballpark • Seattle, WA	7–5	**Gordon (2–1)**	Engman (2–5)	**Somers (5)**	22–11	8–5
Apr 15	at Washington		Husky Ballpark • Seattle, WA	8–6	**Mercado (5–0)**	Raeth (4–3)	**Somers (6)**	23–11	9–5
Apr 16	at Washington		Husky Ballpark • Seattle, WA	6–5	**Somers (3–2)**	Armstrong (1–1)	**Ciuffetelli (1)**	24-11	10–5
Apr 19	at Portland*		Joe Etzel Field • Portland, OR	5–4	**Britton (3–0)**	Ruffo (0–1)	**Somers (7)**	25–11	10–5
Apr 22	vs. Washington State		PK Park • Eugene, OR	8–7	**Somers (4–2)**	Grillo (1–2)	None	26–11	11–5
Apr 23	vs. Washington State		PK Park • Eugene, OR	8–10	Hawkins (2–0)	**Stoffal (0–1)**	Grillo (3)	26–12	11–6
Apr 24	vs. Washington State		PK Park • Eugene, OR	7–8	Brotherton (1–0)	**Mercado (5–1)**	Kaelber (3)	26–13	11–7
Apr 26	vs. Oregon State*		PK Park • Eugene, OR	2–4	Verberg (4–3)	**Ciuffetelli (1–3)**	Brown (6)	26–14	11–7
Apr 29	vs. California		PK Park • Eugene, OR	7–2	**Britton (4–0)**	White (1–5)	**Somers (8)**	27–14	12–7
Apr 30	vs. California		PK Park • Eugene, OR	8–3	**Ayon (3–1)**	King (3–3)	None	28–14	13–7

May (0–0)

Date	Opponent	Rank	Site/stadium	Score	Win	Loss	Save	Overall record	Pac12 record
May 1	vs. California		PK Park • Eugene, OR						
May 3	vs. Oregon State*		PK Park • Eugene, OR						
May 6	at Oregon State		Goss Stadium at Coleman Field • Corvallis, OR						
May 7	at Oregon State		Goss Stadium at Coleman Field • Corvallis, OR						
May 8	at Oregon State		Goss Stadium at Coleman Field • Corvallis, OR						
May 10	vs. UC San Diego*		PK Park • Eugene, OR						
May 11	vs. UC San Diego*		PK Park • Eugene, OR						
May 13	at Arizona State		Phoenix Municipal Stadium • Phoenix, AZ						
May 14	at Arizona State		Phoenix Municipal Stadium • Phoenix, AZ						
May 15	at Arizona State		Phoenix Municipal Stadium • Phoenix, AZ						
May 17	vs. Gonzaga*		PK Park • Eugene, OR						
May 19	vs. Arizona		PK Park • Eugene, OR						
May 20	vs. Arizona		PK Park • Eugene, OR						
May 21	vs. Arizona		PK Park • Eugene, OR						

== Rankings ==
Ranking movements Legend: ██ Increase in ranking ██ Decrease in ranking — = Not ranked RV = Received votes ( ) = First-place votes
	Week																			
Poll	Pre	1	2	3	4	5	6	7	8	9	10	11	12	13	14	15	16	17	18	Final
Coaches'	RV(31)	RV(31)*	RV(1)	RV(8)	RV(2)	RV(29)	22	RV(50)	RV(39)	23	RV(48)	RV(28)	RV(16)	—	RV(31)					
Baseball America	—	—	—	—	—	—	20	23	21	10	25	24	—	—	22					
Collegiate Baseball^	21	—	—	—	—	21	11	21	21	10	21	25	—	—	17					
NCBWA†	28	RV	RV	—	RV	RV	25	30	RV	22	25	24	29	RV	28					
D1Baseball	—	—	—	—	—	—	21	—	—	20	—	—	—	—	—					

^ Collegiate Baseball ranked 40 teams in their preseason poll, but only ranked 30 teams weekly during the season.
† NCBWA ranks 30 teams in their preseason poll, but only ranks 25 teams weekly during the season.
* A new poll was not released for this week, so for comparison purposes, the previous week's ranking is inserted in this week's slot.
