= 2022 Oregon State Beavers baseball team =

College baseball team in the 2022 NCAA Division I season

2022 Oregon State Beavers baseball

Corvallis Regional champions

Corvallis Super Regional, 1—2
- Conference: Pac-12 Conference

Ranking
- Coaches: No. 2
- CB: No. 5
- Record: 48–18 (20–10 Pac-12)
- Head coach: Mitch Canham (3rd season)
- Assistant coaches: Darwin Barney (2nd season); Ryan Gipson (4th season)
- Pitching coach: Rich Dorman (3rd season)
- Home stadium: Goss Stadium at Coleman Field

2022 Pac-12 Conference baseball standings
	Conf.						Overall
Team	W		L		T	PCT	W		L		T	PCT
No. 2 Stanford ‍†‍‡‍^{y}	21	–	9	–	0	.700	47	–	16	–	0	.746
No. 3 Oregon State ‍‍‍^{y}	20	–	10	–	0	.667	48	–	18	–	0	.727
No. 19 UCLA ‍‍‍^{y}	19	–	11	–	0	.633	40	–	24	–	0	.625
Oregon ‍‍‍^{y}	18	–	12	–	0	.600	36	–	25	–	0	.590
Arizona ‍‍‍^{y}	16	–	14	–	0	.533	39	–	25	–	0	.609
Washington ‍‍‍	14	–	16	–	0	.467	30	–	26	–	0	.536
California ‍‍‍	14	–	16	–	0	.467	29	–	27	–	0	.518
Arizona State ‍‍‍	13	–	17	–	0	.433	26	–	31	–	0	.456
Washington State ‍‍‍	12	–	18	–	0	.400	27	–	26	–	0	.509
Utah ‍‍‍	10	–	20	–	0	.333	26	–	27	–	1	.491
USC ‍‍‍	8	–	22	–	0	.267	25	–	28	–	0	.472
† – Conference champion ‡ – Tournament champion y – Invited to the NCAA tournament As of June 13, 2022; Rankings from D1Baseball

The 2022 Oregon State Beavers baseball team represented Oregon State University in the 2022 NCAA Division I baseball season. The Beavers played their home games at Goss Stadium at Coleman Field as members of the Pac-12 Conference. The team was coached by Mitch Canham in his third season at Oregon State.

== Preseason ==
The Beavers entered the season ranked in the Top-25 by four major poll organizations and were picked to finish second in the Pac-12 preseason coaches poll.

== Pac-12 tournament ==
Oregon State finished second in the final regular season conference standing and earned the #2 seed in the inaugural Pac-12 baseball tournament.

The Beavers put together a good run at the Pac-12 tournament, battling their way to the championship game before falling to Stanford. The Beavers were on the wrong end of a 25–22, 10-inning oddity against UCLA, but bounced back to eliminate the Bruins immediately afterward. Trailing 7–6 in the ninth inning of Game 2, OSU tied it on a UCLA fielding error and walked off with the win on an RBI single from Pac-12 Player of the Year Jacob Melton. In the championship game, OSU fought hard and was even tied with Stanford 5–5 at the middle of the seventh inning, but Stanford scored two runs in both the seventh and eighth to seal the win 9–5.

== NCAA tournament ==
The Beavers earned the #3 overall seed in the 2022 NCAA Division I baseball tournament and were selected as host site for the Regional and Super Regional rounds. This is the sixth time Oregon State has been a national seed (2005, 2013, 2014, 2017, 2018) and ninth time hosting a regional.

== Roster ==
2022 Oregon State Beavers baseball team
Players
Coaches

#	Pos.	Name	B/T	Height	Weight	Year	Home town
00	RHP	Hunter Cope	R/R	7 ft 0 in (2.13 m)	267 lb (121 kg)	RS Fr	Newport Beach, CA
2	INF	Jabin Trosky	S/R	5 ft 10 in (1.78 m)	180 lb (82 kg)	Fr	Carmel, CA
3	INF	Matthew Gretler	R/R	6 ft 0 in (1.83 m)	195 lb (88 kg)	Jr	Bonney Lake, WA
4	INF	Justin Boyd	R/R	6 ft 0 in (1.83 m)	201 lb (91 kg)	So	Parker, CO
6	OF	Greg Fuchs	L/R	6 ft 3 in (1.91 m)	198 lb (90 kg)	Jr	Mercer Island, WA
7	INF	Jake Dukart	L/R	6 ft 2 in (1.88 m)	198 lb (90 kg)	Jr	Lake Oswego, OR
8	C	Tanner Smith	R/R	5 ft 11 in (1.8 m)	212 lb (96 kg)	Fr	Chandler, AZ
9	INF	Mason Guerra	R/R	6 ft 3 in (1.91 m)	197 lb (89 kg)	Fr	Beaverton, OR
12	OF	Micah McDowell	L/R	6 ft 1 in (1.85 m)	195 lb (88 kg)	So	Halifax, Nova Scotia
13	C	TJ Wheeler	L/R	5 ft 10 in (1.78 m)	204 lb (93 kg)	Jr	Modesto, CA
14	OF	Thomas Dukart	L/R	6 ft 2 in (1.88 m)	194 lb (88 kg)	RS Fr	Lake Oswego, OR
15	INF	Kyle Dernedde	R/R	5 ft 8 in (1.73 m)	183 lb (83 kg)	So	Tualatin, OR
16	RHP	Reid Sebby	R/R	6 ft 0 in (1.83 m)	199 lb (90 kg)	Sr	Huntington Beach, CA
17	OF	Brady Kasper	L/R	6 ft 1 in (1.85 m)	198 lb (90 kg)	So	Mission Viejo, CA
18	C	Wilson Weber	R/R	6 ft 0 in (1.83 m)	211 lb (96 kg)	Fr	Gresham, OR
19	RHP	A. J. Lattery	R/R	6 ft 5 in (1.96 m)	249 lb (113 kg)	So	Prior Lake, MN
20	RHP	Victor Quinn	R/R	6 ft 1 in (1.85 m)	217 lb (98 kg)	Fr	O'Fallon, MO
21	RHP	Will Frisch (injured)	R/R	6 ft 0 in (1.83 m)	222 lb (101 kg)	So	Stillwater, MN
22	RHP	Jake Pfennigs	R/R	6 ft 7 in (2.01 m)	215 lb (98 kg)	Jr	Post Falls, ID
23	INF	Paul Myro IV	R/R	5 ft 9 in (1.75 m)	193 lb (88 kg)	RS Fr	Las Vegas, NV
24	OF	Tyree Reed (injured)	L/L	6 ft 3 in (1.91 m)	205 lb (93 kg)	Fr	Vallejo, CA
25	RHP	Joey Mundt	R/R	6 ft 5 in (1.96 m)	218 lb (99 kg)	Jr	Hughson, CA
26	LHP	Cooper Hjerpe	L/L	6 ft 3 in (1.91 m)	200 lb (91 kg)	So	Capay, CA
27	C	Gavin Logan	L/R	5 ft 11 in (1.8 m)	212 lb (96 kg)	Jr	Oyen, Alberta
28	INF	Wade Meckler	L/R	5 ft 10 in (1.78 m)	178 lb (81 kg)	Jr	Yorba Linda, CA
29	OF	Jacob Melton	L/L	6 ft 3 in (1.91 m)	208 lb (94 kg)	Jr	Medford, OR
30	RHP	Sam Stuhr	R/R	6 ft 1 in (1.85 m)	200 lb (91 kg)	So	Portland, OR
31	RHP	Jason Hibbard	R/R	6 ft 5 in (1.96 m)	246 lb (112 kg)	So	Nampa, ID
32	RHP	Mitchell Verburg	R/R	6 ft 3 in (1.91 m)	204 lb (93 kg)	RS Sr	Lake Oswego, OR
33		Justin Thorsteinson	L/L	6 ft 3 in (1.91 m)	238 lb (108 kg)	So	Langley, British Columbia
34	RHP	Ian Lawson	R/R	6 ft 7 in (2.01 m)	241 lb (109 kg)	So	Hillsboro, OR
35	RHP	Jacob Kmatz	R/R	6 ft 3 in (1.91 m)	218 lb (99 kg)	Fr	Albuquerque, NM
36	RHP	DJ Carpenter	R/R	6 ft 8 in (2.03 m)	242 lb (110 kg)	Jr	Moreno Valley, CA
37	INF	Travis Bazzana	L/R	6 ft 0 in (1.83 m)	197 lb (89 kg)	So	Sydney, Australia
38	LHP	David Case	L/L	6 ft 0 in (1.83 m)	178 lb (81 kg)	Fr	Pasadena, CA
39	RHP	David Grewe	R/R	6 ft 2 in (1.88 m)	183 lb (83 kg)	Fr	Richland, WA
40	RHP	Jaren Hunter	R/R	6 ft 2 in (1.88 m)	216 lb (98 kg)	So	Damascus, OR
41	RHP	Cole Nelson	R/R	6 ft 4 in (1.93 m)	200 lb (91 kg)	Fr	Lynnwood, WA
43	RHP	Brock Townsend	R/R	5 ft 10 in (1.78 m)	170 lb (77 kg)	Jr	Eugene, OR
44	INF	Garret Forrester	R/R	6 ft 0 in (1.83 m)	204 lb (93 kg)	So	Fair Oaks, CA
50	RHP	Ryan Brown	R/R	6 ft 2 in (1.88 m)	214 lb (97 kg)	RS Fr	Salem, OR
51	RHP	Ben Ferrer	R/R	5 ft 11 in (1.8 m)	212 lb (96 kg)	Jr	Alpharetta, GA
55		Braden Boisvert	R/R	6 ft 1 in (1.85 m)	220 lb (100 kg)	Jr	Sonoita, AZ
60	LHP	Van Larson	L/L	5 ft 11 in (1.8 m)	170 lb (77 kg)	Fr	Mill Valley, CA

Head coach

Mitch Canham

Assistant coach(es)

Darwin Barney
Ryan Gipson

Pitching coach(es)

Rich Dorman

Legend

- (C) Team captain
- (S) Suspended
- (I) Ineligible
- Injured
- Current redshirt

Roster
Last update: April 13, 2022

== Schedule and results ==
2022 Oregon State Beavers baseball game log
Regular season
February (7–0)

Date	Opponent	Rank	Site/stadium	Score	Win	Loss	Save	Overall record	Pac12 record
Feb 18	vs. New Mexico*	No. 18	Surprise Stadium • Surprise, AZ	21–1	Hjerpe (1–0)	Lively (0–1)	None	1–0	
Feb 19	vs. Gonzaga*	No. 18	Surprise Stadium • Surprise, AZ	13–5	Pfennigs (1–0)	Kempner (0–1)	None	2–0	
Feb 20	vs. Gonzaga*	No. 18	Surprise Stadium • Surprise, AZ	9–5	Lawson (1–0)	Trystan (0–1)	None	3–0	
Feb 20	vs. New Mexico*	No. 18	Surprise Stadium • Surprise, AZ	13–3^{8}	Kmatz (1–0)	Russell (0–1)	None	4–0	
Feb 24	vs. Xavier*	No. 14	Surprise Stadium • Surprise, AZ	13–3	Brown (1–0)	Olson (0–1)	None	5–0	
Feb 25	vs. Xavier*	No. 14	Surprise Stadium • Surprise, AZ	9–0	Hjerpe (2–0)	Barnett (0–2)	None	6–0	
Feb 26	vs. Xavier*	No. 14	Surprise Stadium • Surprise, AZ	5–4	Kmatz (2–0)	Eisenhardt (0–2)	**Verburg (1)**	7–0	

March (12–5)

Date	Opponent	Rank	Site/stadium	Score	Win	Loss	Save	Overall record	Pac12 record
Mar 1	vs. Seattle*	No. 13	Goss Stadium at Coleman Field • Corvallis, OR	**RAINED OUT**					
Mar 4	vs. UC Irvine*	No. 13	Goss Stadium at Coleman Field • Corvallis, OR	7–2	**Hjerpe (3–0)**	Frias (2–1)	**Ferrer (1)**	8–0	
Mar 5	vs. UC Irvine*	No. 13	Goss Stadium at Coleman Field • Corvallis, OR	9–5	**Lawson (2–0)**	Pinto (0–2)	**Carpenter (1)**	9–0	
Mar 6	vs. UC Irvine*	No. 13	Goss Stadium at Coleman Field • Corvallis, OR	2–3^{10}	Ingebritson (1–0)	**Verberg (0–1)**	None	9–1	
Mar 11	at Washington State	No. 7	Bailey–Brayton Field • Pullman, WA	13–3	**Hjerpe (4–0)**	Cottrell (1–3)	None	10–1	1–0
Mar 12	at Washington State	No. 7	Bailey–Brayton Field • Pullman, WA	5–1	**Kmatz (3–0)**	Taylor (2–1)	None	11–1	2–0
Mar 13	at Washington State	No. 7	Bailey–Brayton Field • Pullman, WA	8–9	Barison (3–0)	**Verberg (0–2)**	None	11–2	2–1
Mar 15	vs. Grand Canyon*	No. 5	Goss Stadium at Coleman Field • Corvallis, OR	9–8	**Carpenter (1–0)**	Reilly (0–1)	None	12–2	2–1
Mar 16	vs. Grand Canyon*	No. 5	Goss Stadium at Coleman Field • Corvallis, OR	7–13	Young (1–2)	**Lattery (0–1)**	None	12–3	2–1
Mar 18	vs. Arizona State	No. 5	Goss Stadium at Coleman Field • Corvallis, OR	21–0	**Hjerpe (5–0)**	Tulloch (2–1)	None	13–3	3–1
Mar 19	vs. Arizona State	No. 5	Goss Stadium at Coleman Field • Corvallis, OR	12–2	**Kmatz (4–0)**	Luckman (2–1)	**Sebby (1)**	14–3	4–1
Mar 20	vs. Arizona State	No. 5	Goss Stadium at Coleman Field • Corvallis, OR	1–3	Bodlovich (2–1)	**Carpenter (1–1)**	Peery (3)	14–4	4–2
Mar 23	vs. Seattle*	No. 6	Goss Stadium at Coleman Field • Corvallis, OR	8–3	**Verburg (1–2)**	Petersen (0–1)	None	15–4	4–2
Mar 25	at California	No. 6	Evans Diamond • Berkeley, CA	10–4	**Hjerpe (6–0)**	White (0–2)	None	16–4	5–2
Mar 26	at California	No. 6	Evans Diamond • Berkeley, CA	7–8	Proctor (3–1)	**Carpenter (1–2)**	None	16–5	5–3
Mar 27	at California	No. 6	Evans Diamond • Berkeley, CA	13–9	**Brown (2–0)**	Stamos (1–1)	None	17–5	6–3
Mar 29	at Nevada*	No. 3	William Peccole Park • Reno, NV	14–13^{11}	**Sebby (1–0)**	Morris (2–3)	**Brown (1)**	18–5	6–3
Mar 30	at Nevada*	No. 3	William Peccole Park • Reno, NV	9–8	**Verburg (2–2)**	Maas (0–1)	**Brown (2)**	19–5	6–3

April (14–4)

Date	Opponent	Rank	Site/stadium	Score	Win	Loss	Save	Overall record	Pac12 record
Apr 1	vs. Stanford	No. 3	Goss Stadium at Coleman Field • Corvallis, OR	0–1^{10}	Dixon (2–1)	**Sebby (1–1)**	Mathews (1)	19–6	6–4
Apr 2	vs. Stanford	No. 3	Goss Stadium at Coleman Field • Corvallis, OR	3–2^{11}	**Brown (3–0)**	Dixon (2–2)	None	20–6	7–4
Apr 3	vs. Stanford	No. 3	Goss Stadium at Coleman Field • Corvallis, OR	5–8	Mathews (4–1)	**Verburg (2–3)**	None	20–7	7–5
Apr 5	at Portland*	No. 5	Ron Tonkin Field • Hillsboro, OR	5–1	**Hunter (1–0)**	Gillis (2–3)	None	21–7	7–5
Apr 8	at USC	No. 5	Dedeaux Field • Los Angeles, CA	9–1	**Hjerpe (7–0)**	Esqueda (1–1)	None	22–7	8–5
Apr 9	at USC	No. 5	Dedeaux Field • Los Angeles, CA	3–2	**Kmatz (5–0)**	Stromsborg (1–2)	**Brown (3)**	23–7	9–5
Apr 10	at USC	No. 5	Dedeaux Field • Los Angeles, CA	7–3	**Lawson (3–0)**	Keating (2–1)	None	24–7	10–5
Apr 14	vs. Long Beach State*	No. 3	Goss Stadium at Coleman Field • Corvallis, OR	3–1	**Townsend (1–0)**	Johnson (0–1)	**Brown (4)**	25–7	10–5
Apr 15	vs. Long Beach State*	No. 3	Goss Stadium at Coleman Field • Corvallis, OR	8–2	**Hjerpe (8–0)**	Fields (0–1)	**Sebby (2)**	26–7	10–5
Apr 16	vs. Long Beach State*	No. 3	Goss Stadium at Coleman Field • Corvallis, OR	14–3	**Kmatz (6–0)**	Voelker (4–2)	None	27–7	10–5
Apr 18	vs. No. 12 Gonzaga*	No. 2	Goss Stadium at Coleman Field • Corvallis, OR	6–13	Rutherfor (2–0)	**Hunter (1–1)**	Zeglin (1)	27–8	10–5
Apr 19	vs. No. 12 Gonzaga*	No. 2	Goss Stadium at Coleman Field • Corvallis, OR	9–4	**Verburg (3–3)**	Mullan (1–1)	None	28–8	10–5
Apr 22	vs. Washington	No. 2	Goss Stadium at Coleman Field • Corvallis, OR	4–3^{10}	**Brown (4–0)**	Raeth (4–4)	None	29–8	11–5
Apr 23	vs. Washington	No. 2	Goss Stadium at Coleman Field • Corvallis, OR	8–0	**Kmatz (7–0)**	Kirchoff (4–4)	None	30–8	12–5
Apr 24	vs. Washington	No. 2	Goss Stadium at Coleman Field • Corvallis, OR	7–1	**Ferrer (1–0)**	Emanuels (1–2)	**Brown (5)**	31–8	13–5
Apr 26	at Oregon*	No. 2	PK Park • Eugene, OR	4–2	**Verburg (4–3)**	Ciuffetelli (1–3)	**Brown (6)**	32–8	13–5
Apr 29	at Utah	No. 2	Smith's Ballpark • Salt Lake City, UT	1–2	Sox (4–2)	**Hjerpe (8–1)**	McCleve (4)	32–9	13–6
Apr 30	at Utah	No. 2	Smith's Ballpark • Salt Lake City, UT	9–1	**Kmatz (8–0)**	Harris (1–2)	None	33–9	14–6

May (8–4)

Date	Opponent	Rank	Site/stadium	Score	Win	Loss	Save	Overall record	Pac12 record
May 1	at Utah	No. 2	Smith's Ballpark • Salt Lake City, UT	3–1	**Ferrer (2–0)**	Day (1–5)	**Brown (7)**	34–9	15–6
May 3	at Oregon*	No. 2	PK Park • Eugene, OR	2–0	**Townsend (2–0)**	Dallas (3–2)	**Brown (8)**	35–9	15–6
May 6	vs. Oregon	No. 2	Goss Stadium at Coleman Field • Corvallis, OR	5–1	**Hjerpe (9–1)**	Gordon (2–2)	**Ferrer (2)**	36–9	16–6
May 7	vs. Oregon	No. 2	Goss Stadium at Coleman Field • Corvallis, OR	8–7	**Carpenter (2–2)**	Ayon (3–2)	**Brown (9)**	37–9	17–6
May 8	vs. Oregon	No. 2	Goss Stadium at Coleman Field • Corvallis, OR	4–0	**Pfennigs (2–0)**	Stoffal (0–2)	None	38–9	18–6
May 10	vs. Portland*	No. 2	Goss Stadium at Coleman Field • Corvallis, OR	4–0	**Hunter (2–1)**	Rembisz (0–1)	None	39–9	18–6
May 13	at Arizona	No. 2	Hi Corbett Field • Tucson, AZ	12–9	**Ferrer (3–0)**	Long (5–2)	None	40–9	19–6
May 14	at Arizona	No. 2	Hi Corbett Field • Tucson, AZ	2–5	Irvin (5–3)	**Kmatz (8–1)**	None	40–10	19–7
May 15	at Arizona	No. 2	Hi Corbett Field • Tucson, AZ	5–10	Barraza (2–0)	**Carpenter (2–3)**	None	40–11	19–8
May 19	vs. No. 23 UCLA	No. 2	Goss Stadium at Coleman Field • Corvallis, OR	1–4	Rajcic (8–4)	**Hjerpe (9–2)**	Tredwell (4)	40–12	19–9
May 20	vs. No. 23 UCLA	No. 2	Goss Stadium at Coleman Field • Corvallis, OR	4–7	Harrison (2–3)	**Townsend (2–1)**	Tredwell (5)	40–13	19–10
May 21	vs. No. 23 UCLA	No. 2	Goss Stadium at Coleman Field • Corvallis, OR	9–3	**Pfennigs (3–0)**	Austin (3–2)	None	41–13	20–10

Postseason
Pac-12 tournament (3–2)

Date	Opponent	Rank	Site/stadium	Score	Win	Loss	Save	Overall record	Pac-12 tournament record
May 25	vs. (7) Washington	No. 4 (2)	Scottsdale Stadium • Scottsdale, AZ	13–8	**Verburg (5–3)**	Velazquez (3–1)	None	42–13	1–0
May 26	vs. (6) California	No. 4 (2)	Scottsdale Stadium • Scottsdale, AZ	3–1	**Hjerpe (10–2)**	Zobac (4–4)	**Sebby (3)**	43–13	2–0
May 28	vs. No. 20 (3) UCLA	No. 4 (2)	Scottsdale Stadium • Scottsdale, AZ	22–25^{10}	Tredwell (3–1)	**Brown (4–1)**	None	43–14	2–1
May 28	vs. No. 20 (3) UCLA	No. 4 (2)	Scottsdale Stadium • Scottsdale, AZ	8–7	**Ferrer (4–0)**	Austin (4–3)	None	44–14	3–1
May 29	vs. No. 3 (1) Stanford	No. 4 (2)	Scottsdale Stadium • Scottsdale, AZ	5–9	Bruno (5–1)	**Sebby (1–2)**	Pancer (2)	44–15	3–2

Corvallis Regional (3–1)

Date	Opponent	Rank	Site/stadium	Score	Win	Loss	Save	Overall record	Regional record
June 3	vs. (4) New Mexico State	No. 3 (1)	Goss Stadium at Coleman Field • Corvallis, OR	5–4^{10}	**Brown (5–1)**	Bustamante (1–3)	None	45–15	1–0
June 4	vs. (3) San Diego	No. 3 (1)	Goss Stadium at Coleman Field • Corvallis, OR	12–3	**Pfennigs (4–0)**	Kysar (4–1)	**Townsend (1)**	46–15	2–0
June 5	vs. (2) Vanderbilt	No. 3 (1)	Goss Stadium at Coleman Field • Corvallis, OR	1–8	Futrell (9–3)	**Kmatz (8–2)**	Schultz (8)	46–16	2–1
June 6	vs. (2) Vanderbilt	No. 3 (1)	Goss Stadium at Coleman Field • Corvallis, OR	7–6	**Sebby (2–2)**	Grayson (1–1)	**Hjerpe (1)**	47–16	3–1

Corvallis Super Regional (1–2)

Date	Opponent	Rank	Site/stadium	Score	Win	Loss	Save	Overall record	Super Regional record
June 11	vs. No. 14 Auburn	No. 3	Goss Stadium at Coleman Field • Corvallis, OR	5–7	Sheehan (2–0)	**Pfennigs (4–1)**	Burkhalter (14)	47–17	0–1
June 12	vs. No. 14 Auburn	No. 3	Goss Stadium at Coleman Field • Corvallis, OR	4–3	**Hjerpe (11–2)**	Gonzalez (7–3)	**Ferrer (3)**	48–17	1–1
June 13	vs. No. 14 Auburn	No. 3	Goss Stadium at Coleman Field • Corvallis, OR	3–4	Skipper (6–3)	**Hunter (2–2)**	Burkhalter (15)	48–18	1–2

- Win
- Loss
- Postponement/Tie
- Bold: Oregon State team member
- Rankings from D1 Baseball
- (#) Tournament seedings in parentheses.
- * indicates a non-conference game.

== Corvallis Regional ==
Corvallis Regional Teams
(1) No. 3 Oregon State Beavers	(2) Vanderbilt Commodores	(3) San Diego Toreros	(4) New Mexico State Aggies

First round
1	3 Oregon State	5
4	New Mexico State	4^{10}
3	San Diego	3
2	Vanderbilt	2
Lower round 1
4	New Mexico State	1
2	Vanderbilt	21

Semi-finals
1	3 Oregon State	12
3	San Diego	3
Lower final
2	Vanderbilt	14
3	San Diego	4

Finals
1	3 Oregon State	1	7
2	Vanderbilt	8	6

== Corvallis Super Regional ==
Corvallis Super Regional Teams
No. 3 Oregon State Beavers	No. 14 Auburn Tigers

Championship Series
3 Oregon State	5	4	3
14 Auburn	7	3	4

== Rankings ==
Ranking movements Legend: ██ Increase in ranking ██ Decrease in ranking
	Week																
Poll	Pre	1	2	3	4	5	6	7	8	9	10	11	12	13	14	15	Final
Coaches'	20	20*	9	6	6	6	4	5	2	2	2	2	2	2	3	2	10
Baseball America	11	12	9	8	3	2	2	6	5	3	2	2	1	2	7	4	11
Collegiate Baseball^	42	19	7	4	3	11	8	19	16	7	5	3	1	2	5	5	11
NCBWA†	18	12	9	6	5	6	4	5	2	2	2	2	1	2	4	3	10
D1Baseball	18	14	13	7	5	6	3	5	3	2	2	2	2	2	4	3	10

^ Collegiate Baseball ranked 40 teams in their preseason poll, but only ranked 30 teams weekly during the season.
† NCBWA ranks 30 teams in their preseason poll, but only ranks 25 teams weekly during the season.
* A new poll was not released for this week, so for comparison purposes, the previous week's ranking is inserted in this week's slot.
