= 2022 USC Trojans baseball team =

American college baseball season

2022 USC Trojans baseball
- Conference: Pac-12 Conference
- Record: 25-26 (8-20 Pac-12)
- Head coach: Jason Gill (3rd season)
- Assistant coaches: David Tillotson (1st season); Ted Silva (3rd season); Matt Fonteno (1st season)
- Home stadium: Dedeaux Field (Compacity: 2,500)

2022 Pac-12 Conference baseball standings
	Conf.						Overall
Team	W		L		T	PCT	W		L		T	PCT
No. 2 Stanford ‍†‍‡‍^{y}	21	–	9	–	0	.700	47	–	16	–	0	.746
No. 3 Oregon State ‍‍‍^{y}	20	–	10	–	0	.667	48	–	18	–	0	.727
No. 19 UCLA ‍‍‍^{y}	19	–	11	–	0	.633	40	–	24	–	0	.625
Oregon ‍‍‍^{y}	18	–	12	–	0	.600	36	–	25	–	0	.590
Arizona ‍‍‍^{y}	16	–	14	–	0	.533	39	–	25	–	0	.609
Washington ‍‍‍	14	–	16	–	0	.467	30	–	26	–	0	.536
California ‍‍‍	14	–	16	–	0	.467	29	–	27	–	0	.518
Arizona State ‍‍‍	13	–	17	–	0	.433	26	–	31	–	0	.456
Washington State ‍‍‍	12	–	18	–	0	.400	27	–	26	–	0	.509
Utah ‍‍‍	10	–	20	–	0	.333	26	–	27	–	1	.491
USC ‍‍‍	8	–	22	–	0	.267	25	–	28	–	0	.472
† – Conference champion ‡ – Tournament champion y – Invited to the NCAA tournament As of June 13, 2022; Rankings from D1Baseball

The 2022 USC Trojans baseball team represented the University of Southern California during the 2022 NCAA Division I baseball season. The Trojans played their home games for the 48th season at Dedeaux Field. The team was coached by Jason Gill in his 3rd season at USC.

The Trojans finished the season 25-28 with an 8-22 record in conference play, one of the worst seasons in Trojan baseball history. They finished last in the Pac-12 Conference.

== Previous season ==
The Trojans ended the 2021 season with a record of 13–17 in conference play and with a 25-26 overall record good for T-8th best with Washington State Cougars in the Pac-12.

== Roster ==
2022 USC Trojans baseball team
Players
Coaches

#	Pos.	Name	B/T	Height	Weight	Year	Home town
2	UTL	Tyler Lozano	R/R	6 ft 0 in (1.83 m)	190 lb (86 kg)	RS Jr	Stockton, CA
3	INF	Caiden Huber	L/R	6 ft 3 in (1.91 m)	195 lb (88 kg)	Fr	Yucaipa, CA
4	INF	Johnny Olmstead	R/R	6 ft 2 in (1.88 m)	185 lb (84 kg)	RS So	Costa Mesa, CA
5	OF	Miko Rodriguez	R/R	6 ft 1 in (1.85 m)	205 lb (93 kg)	RS So	Greand Rapids, MI
6	INF	D'Andre Smith	R/R	5 ft 9 in (1.75 m)	180 lb (82 kg)	So	Diamond Bar, CA
7	OF	Trevor Halsema	R/R	6 ft 3 in (1.91 m)	210 lb (95 kg)	RS Sr	San Diego, CA
8	INF	Nate Clow	L/R	6 ft 0 in (1.83 m)	177 lb (80 kg)	So	Federal Way, WA
9	OF	Carson Wells	L/R	6 ft 1 in (1.85 m)	190 lb (86 kg)	So	Henderson, NV
10	C	Tyresse Turner	S/R	5 ft 10 in (1.78 m)	170 lb (77 kg)	RS So	La Palma, CA
11	RHP	Carson Lambert	L/R	6 ft 3 in (1.91 m)	220 lb (100 kg)	RS Jr	Thousand Oaks, CA
13	C	Revan Lazarus	R/R	5 ft 9 in (1.75 m)	185 lb (84 kg)	Fr	Stamford, CT
14	RHP	Channing Austin	R/R	6 ft 3 in (1.91 m)	200 lb (91 kg)	So	Brooklyn NY
15	OF	Rhylan Thomas	L/L	6 ft 0 in (1.83 m)	170 lb (77 kg)	RS So	Newbury Park, CA
17	RHP	Owen Wendell-Braly	R/R	6 ft 3 in (1.91 m)	190 lb (86 kg)	Fr	Hudson NY
18	RHP	Josh Blum	R/R	6 ft 1 in (1.85 m)	195 lb (88 kg)	Fr	Bellaire, TX
20	RHP	Ethan Hoopingarner	R/R	6 ft 3 in (1.91 m)	200 lb (91 kg)	RS So	Laguna Beach, CA
21	OF	Adrian Colon-Rosado	L/L	6 ft 1 in (1.85 m)	205 lb (93 kg)	RS So	Humacao, P.R.
22	INF	Clay Owens	L/R	6 ft 0 in (1.83 m)	196 lb (89 kg)	RS Jr	Corona, CA
23	RHP	Charlies Hurley	L/R	6 ft 8 in (2.03 m)	218 lb (99 kg)	So	Sacramento, CA
24	RHP	Ethan Reed	L/R	6 ft 4 in (1.93 m)	200 lb (91 kg)	RS So	Laguna Niguel, CA
25	RHP	Fisher Johnson	L/R	6 ft 2 in (1.88 m)	190 lb (86 kg)	Fr	Aptos, CA
26	OF	Cole Gabrielson	R/R	6 ft 0 in (1.83 m)	180 lb (82 kg)	Jr	Portola Valley, CA
27	INF	Emilio Rosas	R/R	6 ft 2 in (1.88 m)	200 lb (91 kg)	RS Jr	Yorba Linda, CA
28	RHP	Tyler Stromsborg	R/R	6 ft 4 in (1.93 m)	200 lb (91 kg)	So	Newport Beach, CA
29	LHP	Isaac Esqueda	L/L	6 ft 0 in (1.83 m)	220 lb (100 kg)	RS Sr	Pomona, CA
30	RHP	Garrett Clarke	R/R	6 ft 2 in (1.88 m)	190 lb (86 kg)	RS Jr	Thousand Oaks, CA
31	RHP	Eric Hammond	R/R	6 ft 4 in (1.93 m)	185 lb (84 kg)	Fr	Keller, TX
32	C	Matt Keating	R/R	6 ft 1 in (1.85 m)	215 lb (98 kg)	So	Omaha, NE
33	C	Garret Guillemette	R/R	6 ft 1 in (1.85 m)	210 lb (95 kg)	So	Yorba Linda, CA
35	RHP	Alex Dargan	R/R	6 ft 2 in (1.88 m)	225 lb (102 kg)	Fr	Mill Valley, CA
36	INF	Nick Lopez	S/R	6 ft 1 in (1.85 m)	205 lb (93 kg)	Jr	Santa Ana, CA
37	LHP	Will O'Neill	L/L	6 ft 1 in (1.85 m)	195 lb (88 kg)	Fr	Newport Beach, CA
38	RHP	Toby Spach	R/R	6 ft 2 in (1.88 m)	185 lb (84 kg)	RS Jr	Carpinteria, CA
39	RHP	Jason Starrels	L/R	5 ft 10 in (1.78 m)	185 lb (84 kg)	RS Sr	Pacific Palisades, CA
41	C	Ethan Firestone	R/R	6 ft 2 in (1.88 m)	200 lb (91 kg)	So	Burbank, CA
43	RHP	Kyle Wisch	R/R	6 ft 4 in (1.93 m)	225 lb (102 kg)	RS So	Clarendon Hills, IL
44	INF	Malikai Wickley	R/R	6 ft 4 in (1.93 m)	225 lb (102 kg)	RS So	San Antonio, TX
45	INF	Jaden Agassi	R/R	6 ft 3 in (1.91 m)	195 lb (88 kg)	So	Las Vegas, NV
50	OF	Harrison Feinberg	R/R	6 ft 1 in (1.85 m)	205 lb (93 kg)	Fr	Greenwich, CT
51	LHP	Evan Clark	L/L	6 ft 0 in (1.83 m)	180 lb (82 kg)	Fr	Western Springs, IL

Head coach

Jason Gill (3rd season)

Assistant coach(es)

Ted Silva (3rd season)
Matt Fonteno (1st season)
David Tillotson (1st season)

Legend

- (C) Team captain
- (S) Suspended
- (I) Ineligible
- Injured
- Current redshirt

Roster
Last update: January 18, 2022

== Schedule ==
Legend
	USC win
	USC loss
	Postponement
	Canceled
**Bold**	USC team member
*	Non-Conference game
^	Conference game
†	Make-Up Game

2022 USC Trojans baseball game log
Regular Season: 18-15 (Home: 0–0 (Conference: 0-0, Non-Conference: 0-0); Away: 0–0 (Conference: 0-0, Non Conference: 0-0))

February: 5-2 (Home: 5-2)
Game #	Date Time (PT)	Opponent	Rank	Stadium	Score	Win	Loss	Save	Attendance	Overall Pac-12	Sources
1	February 18; 6:00 P.M.	vs Santa Clara*	-	Dedeaux Field; Los Angeles, CA	2-0	**Isaac Esqueda (1-0)**	Cole Kitchen (0-1)	**Carson Lambert (1)**	1,374	1-0; 0-0	W1
2	February 19; 2:00 P.M.	vs Santa Clara*		Dedeaux Field; Los Angeles, CA	7-5	**Matt Keating (1-0)**	Drake Davis (0-1)	None	873	2-0; 0-0	W2
3	February 20; 1:00 P.M.	vs Santa Clara*		Dedeaux Field; Los Angeles, CA	7-9	Jared Feikes (1-0)	**Garrett Clarke (0-1)**	Ethan Heinrich (1)	744	2-1; 0-0	L1
4	February 22; 6:00 P.M.	vs UC San Diego*		Dedeaux Field; Los Angeles, CA	2-6	Nolan McCracken (1-0)	**Toby Spach (0-1)**	None	358	2-2; 0-0	L2
5	February 25; 6:00 P.M.	vs Omaha*		Dedeaux Field; Los Angeles, CA	4-3 (12)	**Charlie Hurley (1-0)**	Joey Machado (0-1)	None	457	3-2; 0-0	W1
6	February 26; 2:00 P.M.	vs Omaha*		Dedeaux Field; Los Angeles, CA	5-2	**Tyler Stromsborg (1-0)**	Charlie Bell (0-1)	**Garrett Clarke (1)**	511	4-2; 0-0	W2
7	February 27; 1:00 P.M.	vs Omaha*		Dedeaux Field; Los Angeles, CA	7-4	**Kyle Wisch (1-0)**	Howe Tanner (0-1)	**Matt Keating (1)**	468	5-2; 0-0	W3

March: 9-6 (Home: 0–0; Away: 0–0)
Game #	Date Time (PT)	Opponent	Rank	Stadium	Score	Win	Loss	Save	Attendance	Overall Pac-12	Sources
8	March 1; 6:00 P.M.	at Loyola Marymount*		George C. Page Stadium; Los Angeles, CA	8-2	**Toby Spach (1-1)**	Quinn Lavelle (0-2)	None	380	6-2; 0-0	W4
9	March 4; 6:00 P.M.	vs Wagner*		Dedeaux Field; Los Angeles, CA	11-3	**Jaden Agassi (1-0)**	Frankie Wright (0-3)	None	611	7-2; 0-0	W5
10	March 5; 2:00 P.M.	vs Wagner*		Dedeaux Field; Los Angeles, CA	15-4	**Carson Lambert (1-0)**	Ruben Del Castillo (1-1)	None	548	8-2; 0-0	W6
11	March 6; 1:00 P.M.	vs Wagner*		Dedeaux Field; Los Angeles, CA	6-2	**Charlie Hurley (2-0)**	Connor Hayden (0-2)	None	445	9-2; 0-0	W7
12	March 11; 5:00 P.M.	at UCLA^ Rivalry		Jackie Robinson Stadium; Los Angeles, CA	7-4	**Carson Lambert (2-0)**	Jake Brooks (2-2)	**Nate Clow (1)**	857	10-2; 1-0	W8
13	March 12; 5:00 P.M.	at UCLA^ Rivalry		Jackie Robinson Stadium; Los Angeles, CA	2-11	Max Rajcic (2-1)	**Tyler Stromsborg (1-1)**	None	1,655	10-3; 1-1	L1
14	March 13; 3:00 P.M.	at UCLA^ Rivalry		Jackie Robinson Stadium; Los Angeles, CA	6-3	**Charlie Hurley (3-0)**	Kelly Austin (1-1)	**Matt Keating (2)**	1,692	11-3; 2-1	W1
15	March 15; 6:00 P.M.	vs UConn*	No. 25	Dedeaux Field; Los Angeles, CA	7-1	Ian Cooke (3-0)	**Ethan Hoopingarner (0-1)**	None	311	11-4 –2-1	L1
16	March 18; 6:00 P.M.	vs California^	No. 25	Dedeaux Field; Los Angeles, CA	6-2	**Jaden Agassi (2-0)**	Josh White (0-1)	None	409	12-4; 3-1	W1
17	March 19; 2:00 P.M.	vs California^	No. 25	Dedeaux Field; Los Angeles, CA	9-5	Nick Proctor (2-1)	**Nate Clow (0-1)**	None	573	12-5; 3-2	L1
18	March 20; 1:00 P.M.	vs California^	No. 25	Dedeaux Field; Los Angeles, CA	3-2	Ian May (1-0)	**Charlie Hurley (3-1)**	Nick Proctor (1)	1,281	12-6; 3-3	L2
19	March 22; 6:00 P.M.	vs Cal State Fullerton*		Dedeaux Field; Los Angeles, CA	11-10	**Matt Keating (2-0)**	Michael Weisberg (1-1)	None	587	13-6; 3-3	W1
20	March 25; 4:00 P.M.	at Oregon^		PK Park; Eugene, OR	9-7	RJ Gordon (1-0)	**Jaden Agassi (2-1)**	Kolby Somers (3)	1,289	13-7; 3-4	L1
21	March 26; 2:00 P.M.	at Oregon^		PK Park; Eugene, OR	6-5	**Carson Lambert (3-0)**	Matt Dallas (1-1)	**Matt Keating (3)**	1,640	14-7; 4-4	W1
22	March 27; 12:00 P.M.	at Oregon^		PK Park; Eugene, OR	7-6	Dylan Sabia (1-0)	**Carson Lambert (3-1)**	Kolby Somers (4)	1,277	14-8; 4-5	L1
-	March 30; 6:00 P.M.	vs Seattle*		Dedeaux Field; Los Angeles, CA	The Game between the Seattle Redhawks vs USC Trojans was cancelled due to COVID-19 within the Redhawks program'						

April: 0–0 (Home: 0–0; Away: 0–0)
Game #	Date Time (PT)	Opponent	Rank	Stadium	Score	Win	Loss	Save	Attendance	Overall Pac-12	Sources
23	April 1; 6:00 P.M.	vs San Jose State*		Dedeaux Field; Los Angeles, CA	–			—		– –	
24	April 2; 2:00 P.M.	vs San Jose State*		Dedeaux Field; Los Angeles, CA	–			—		– –	
25	April 3; 1:00 P.M.	vs San Jose State*		Dedeaux Field; Los Angeles, CA	–			—		– –	
26	April 4; 6:00 P.M.	Hawaii*		Dedeaux Field; Los Angeles, CA	–			—		– –	
27	April 8; 6:00 P.M.	vs Oregon State^		Dedeaux Field; Los Angeles, CA	–			—		– –	
28	April 9; 2:00 P.M.	vs Oregon State^		Dedeaux Field; Los Angeles, CA	–			—		– –	
29	April 10; 1:00 P.M.	vs Oregon State^		Dedeaux Field; Los Angeles, CA	–			—		– –	
30	April 12; 3:00 P.M.	at CSUN Matadors		Matador Field; Northridge CA	–			—		– –	
31	April 14; TBD P.M.	at Arizona State^		Phoenix Municipal Stadium; Phoenix, AZ	–			—		– –	
32	April 15; TBD P.M.	at Arizona State^		Phoenix Municipal Stadium; Phoenix, AZ	–			—		– –	
33	April 16; TBD P.M.	at Arizona State^		Phoenix Municipal Stadium; Phoenix, AZ	–			—		– –	
34	April 19; TBD P.M.	at Cal State Fullerton*		Goodwin Field; Fullerton, CA	–			—		– –	
35	April 22; 6:00 P.M.	vs Utah^		Dedeaux Field; Los Angeles, CA	–			—		– –	
36	April 23; 5:00 P.M.	vs Utah^		Dedeaux Field; Los Angeles, CA	–			—		– –	
37	April 24; 1:00 P.M.	vs Utah^		Dedaux Field; Los Angeles, CA	–			—		– –	
38	April 26; 6:00 P.M.	vs UC Santa Barbara*		Dedeaux Field; Los Angeles, CA	–			—		– –	
39	April 29; 6:00 P.M.	at Washington State^		Bailey-Brayton Field; Pullman, WA	–			—		– –	
40	April 30; 6:00 P.M.	at Washington State^		Bailey-Brayton Field; Pullman, WA	–			—		– –	

May: 0–0 (Home: 0–0; Away: 0–0)
Game #	Date Time (PT)	Opponent	Rank	Stadium	Score	Win	Loss	Save	Attendance	Overall Pac-12	Sources
41	May 1; 12:00 P.M.	at Washington State^		Bailey-Brayton Field; Pullman, WA	–			—		– –	
42	May 3; 6:00 P.M.	vs CSUN Matadors*		Dedeadux Field; Los Angeles, CA	–			—		– –	
43	May 6; 7:00 P.M.	vs Arizona^		Dedeaux Field; Los Angeles, CA	–			—		– –	
44	May 7; 2:00 P.M.	vs Arizona^		Dedeaux Field; Los Angeles, CA	–			—		– –	
45	May 8; 2:00 P.M.	vs Arizona^		Dedeaux Field; Los Angeles, CA	–			—		– –	
46	May 11; TBD P.M.	at Long Beach State*		Blair Field; Los Angeles, CA	–			—		– –	
47	May 13; 7:00 P.M.	vs Washington^		Dedeaux Field; Los Angeles, CA	–			—		– –	
48	May 14; 1:00 P.M.	vs Washington^		Dedeaux Field; Los Angeles, CA	–			—		– –	
49	May 15; 12:00 P.M.	vs Washington^		Dedeaux Field; Los Angeles, CA	–			—		– –	
50	May 17; TBD P.M.	at UC Santa Barbara*		Caesar Uyesaka Stadium; Santa Barbara, CA	–			—		– –	
51	May 19; 6:00 P.M.	at Stanford^		Klein Field at Sunken Diamond; Stanford, CA	1–7	Williams (8-1)	**Agassi (3-2)**	—	1598	25–26; 8–20	
52	May 20; 7:00 P.M.	at Stanford^		Klein Field at Sunken Diamond; Stanford, CA	–			—		– –	
53	May 21; 12:00 P.M.	at Stanford^		Klein Field at Sunken Diamond; Stanford, CA	–			—		– –	

== Rankings ==
Ranking movements Legend: — = Not ranked
	Week																			
Poll	Pre	1	2	3	4	5	6	7	8	9	10	11	12	13	14	15	16	17	18	Final
Coaches'		*																		
Baseball America																				
Collegiate Baseball^	—																			
NCBWA†																				
D1Baseball	—																			

^ Collegiate Baseball ranked 40 teams in their preseason poll, but only ranked 30 teams weekly during the season.
† NCBWA ranks 30 teams in their preseason poll, but only ranks 25 teams weekly during the season.
* A new poll was not released for this week, so for comparison purposes, the previous week's ranking is inserted in this week's slot.
