= 2022 Pac-12 Conference baseball tournament =

- Teams: 8
- Format: Double-elimination
- Finals site: Scottsdale Stadium; Scottsdale, Arizona
- Champions: Stanford (1st title)
- Winning coach: David Esquer (1st title)
- MVP: Garret Forrester (Oregon State)
- Attendance: 19,363
- Television: Pac-12 Network; ESPN2

2022 Pac-12 Conference baseball standings
	Conf.						Overall
Team	W		L		T	PCT	W		L		T	PCT
No. 2 Stanford ‍†‍‡‍^{y}	21	–	9	–	0	.700	47	–	16	–	0	.746
No. 3 Oregon State ‍‍‍^{y}	20	–	10	–	0	.667	48	–	18	–	0	.727
No. 19 UCLA ‍‍‍^{y}	19	–	11	–	0	.633	40	–	24	–	0	.625
Oregon ‍‍‍^{y}	18	–	12	–	0	.600	36	–	25	–	0	.590
Arizona ‍‍‍^{y}	16	–	14	–	0	.533	39	–	25	–	0	.609
Washington ‍‍‍	14	–	16	–	0	.467	30	–	26	–	0	.536
California ‍‍‍	14	–	16	–	0	.467	29	–	27	–	0	.518
Arizona State ‍‍‍	13	–	17	–	0	.433	26	–	31	–	0	.456
Washington State ‍‍‍	12	–	18	–	0	.400	27	–	26	–	0	.509
Utah ‍‍‍	10	–	20	–	0	.333	26	–	27	–	1	.491
USC ‍‍‍	8	–	22	–	0	.267	25	–	28	–	0	.472
† – Conference champion ‡ – Tournament champion y – Invited to the NCAA tournament As of June 13, 2022; Rankings from D1Baseball

The 2022 Pac-12 Conference baseball tournament was held from May 25 through 29 at Scottsdale Stadium in Scottsdale, Arizona. This was the first postseason championship event sponsored by the Pac-12 Conference since 1978, the first such event to be held at a neutral site, and the first to feature more than two teams. The eight team, double-elimination tournament winner earned the league's automatic bid to the 2022 NCAA Division I baseball tournament.

== Seeds ==
This tournament featured 8 out of 11 teams in this conference. They played a double elimination tournament. The seedings were determined upon completion of regular season play. The winning percentage of the teams in conference play determined the tournament seedings. There were tiebreakers in place to seed teams with identical conference records.

Seed	School	Conf.	Over.	Tiebreaker
#1	Stanford	21–9	37–14	
#2	Oregon State	20–10	41–13	
#3	UCLA	19–11	35–20	
#4	Oregon	18–12	35–21	
#5	Arizona	16–14	35–21	
#6	California	14–16	28–25	2–1 vs Washington
#7	Washington	14–16	30–24	1–2 vs California
#8	Arizona State	13–17	25–30	

== Bracket ==
First round
5	Arizona	8
4	Oregon	6
8	Arizona State	3
1	Stanford	6
4	~~Oregon~~	2
8	Arizona State	4
7	Washington	8
2	Oregon State	13
6	California	4
3	UCLA	1
7	~~Washington~~	8
3	UCLA	14

Second round
5	Arizona	8
1	Stanford	15
8	~~Arizona State~~	6
5	Arizona	8
2	Oregon State	3
6	California	1
3	UCLA	9^{(10)}
6	~~California~~	7

Semifinals
1	Stanford	5	-
5	~~Arizona~~	4	-
2	Oregon State	22	8
3	~~UCLA~~	25^{(10)}	7

Finals
1	Stanford	9
2	Oregon State	5

== Schedule ==
2022 Bracket

Game	Time*	Matchup^{#}	Score	Television	Attendance
Wednesday, May 25
1	9:00 a.m.	**No. 5 Arizona** vs. No. 4 Oregon	8–6	Pac-12 Network	2,044
2	12:55 p.m.	No. 8 Arizona State vs. **No. 1 Stanford**	3–6	Pac-12 Network	2,044
3	4:45 p.m.	No. 7 Washington vs. **No. 2 Oregon State**	8–13	Pac-12 Network	2,019
4	10:15 p.m.	**No. 6 California** vs. No. 3 UCLA	4–1	Pac-12 Network	2,019
Thursday, May 26
5	9:00 a.m.	No. 4 Oregon vs. **No. 8 Arizona State**	2–4	Pac-12 Network	1,682
6	12:57 p.m.	No. 7 Washington vs. **No. 3 UCLA**	8–14	Pac-12 Network	1,682
7	5:15 p.m.	No. 5 Arizona vs. **No. 1 Stanford**	8–15	Pac-12 Network	3,174
8	10:15 p.m.	**No. 2 Oregon State** vs. No. 6 California	3–1	Pac-12 Network	3,174
Friday, May 27
9	3:00 p.m.	No. 8 Arizona State vs. **No. 5 Arizona**	6–8	Pac-12 Network	3,099
10	6:35 p.m.	No. 6 California vs. **No. 3 UCLA**	7–9 ^{(10)}	Pac-12 Network	3,099
Semifinals – Saturday, May 28
11	9:00 a.m.	**No. 1 Stanford** vs. No. 5 Arizona	5–4	Pac-12 Network	3,321
12	12:56 p.m.	No. 2 Oregon State vs. **No. 3 UCLA**	22–25 ^{(10)}	Pac-12 Network	3,321
13	7:40 p.m.	No. 3 UCLA vs. **No. 2 Oregon State**	7–8	Pac-12 Network	3,321
Championship – Sunday, May 29
14	7:00 p.m.	**No. 1 Stanford** vs. No. 2 Oregon State	9–5	ESPN2	4,024
*Game times in MST. # – Rankings denote tournament seed.

=== All-tournament Team ===
The following players were members of the 2022 Pac-12 Baseball All-Tournament Team. Player in Bold selected as Tournament MVP.

Position	Player	School
C	Gavin Logan	Oregon State
1B	**Garret Forrester**	Oregon State
2B	Garen Caulfield	Arizona
3B	Drew Bowser	Stanford
SS	Ethan Gourson	UCLA
SS	Adam Crampton	Stanford
DH	Daniel Susac	Arizona
OF	Justin Boyd	Oregon State
OF	Jacob Melton	Oregon State
OF	Michael Curialle	UCLA
P	Josh White	California
P	Kyle Luckham	Arizona State
