= Scottsdale Stadium =

Baseball stadium in Scottsdale, Arizona

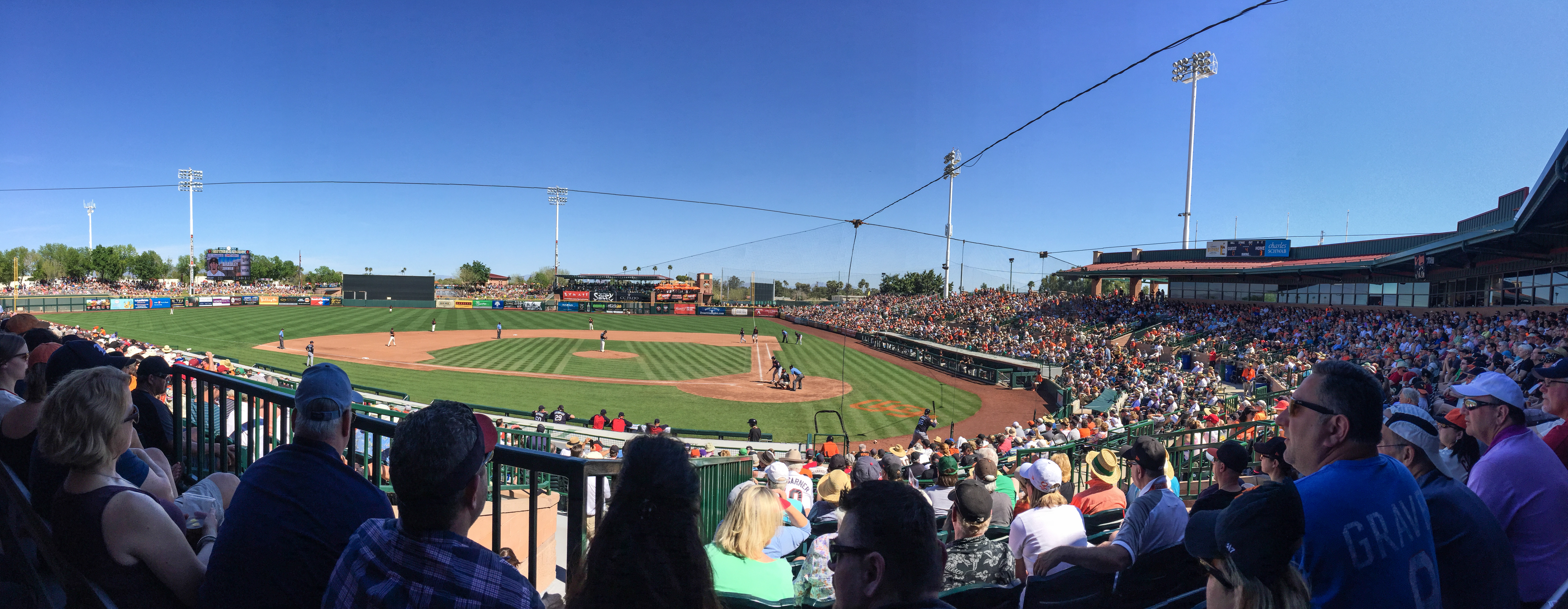
- Scottsdale Stadium during a March 2017 spring training game between the Cleveland Indians and San Francisco Giants
- Interactive map of Scottsdale Stadium
- Location: 7408 E. Osborn Road; Scottsdale, AZ 85251
- Coordinates: 33°29′18″N 111°55′16″W
- Owner: City of Scottsdale
- Capacity: 12,000
- Surface: Grass
- Field size: Left Field Line: 360’ Right Field Line: 330’ Center Field: 430’ Outfield Fence Height 10’
- Public transit: Valley Metro Bus: Scottsdale Miller/Hayden Trolley

Construction
- Groundbreaking: April 1991
- Built: 1956; rebuilt 1991
- Opened: March 12, 1992
- Architect: HOK Sport

Tenants
- San Francisco Giants (MLB) (spring training) (1984–present); Scottsdale Scorpions (AFL) (1992–present); Phoenix Firebirds (PCL) (1992–1997); Valley Vipers (WBL) (2000); Arizona League Giants (AZL) (2005–present); Arizona Centennials (FPBL) (2012); Arizona United SC (USL) (2015)

Scottsdale Stadium is a baseball stadium located in Scottsdale, Arizona, United States. Designed by the architect of the Baltimore Orioles’ Camden Yards, HOK Sport Venue Event (which would eventually be renamed Populous in 2009), the stadium was expanded to its current state in 1992 and holds 12,000 people. It has been the spring training home of the San Francisco Giants since 1984, when the capacity was just 4,721.

The stadium hosted three games of the 2006 World Baseball Classic.

== History ==
The stadium was built on the site of the old Scottsdale Stadium, which opened in 1956. The Baltimore Orioles (1956–58), Boston Red Sox (1959–65), Chicago Cubs (1967-78) and Oakland Athletics (1979–83) used old Scottsdale Stadium as their spring training base before the Giants moved there in 1984. The new stadium cost $7 million to build and was completed in under a year.

In 1992, Angels pitcher Matt Keough was struck by a foul ball while sitting in the dugout during spring training and was critically injured. His life was saved in part because the stadium is across the street from a hospital, the HonorHealth Scottsdale Osborne Medical Center.

The stadium underwent a $23.1 million renovation in 2006. The renovations included a new team store, expanded clubhouse, baseball training and treatment room, batting tunnel, centerfield entrance, Charro Pavilion, and practice fields next to the stadium. In return, the San Francisco Giants agreed to play at the stadium for an additional 20 years, through 2025, with an option to extend the lease to 2035.

== Tenants ==
The Giants hold their major league and minor league training operation at the two facilities. Scottsdale Stadium is consistently one of the top attended venues in Arizona's Cactus League. The Scottsdale Charros organize and promote San Francisco spring training in the city.

Scottsdale Stadium was the home of the Phoenix Firebirds of the Pacific Coast League from 1992 until 1997, who had moved from Phoenix Municipal Stadium after the new stadium was completed. The Firebirds moved to Fresno, California, and became the Grizzlies, in order to make room for the National League's Arizona Diamondbacks, who began play in 1998. Scottsdale also hosted the Valley Vipers of the independent Western Baseball League in 2000, the only season of that team's existence. Arizona United SC of the United Soccer League played at Scottsdale in 2015.

The stadium is also host of the Scottsdale Scorpions in the Arizona Fall League, and hosts the Fall League's championship game at the end of November. During the summer the stadium is home of the Arizona League Giants of the Arizona League.

== World Baseball Classic ==
In March 2006, the stadium hosted three games from Pool B of the World Baseball Classic.

- March 7, 2006
  - Canada 11, South Africa 8
- March 8, 2006
  - Mexico 10, South Africa 4
- March 10, 2006
  - United States 17, South Africa 0

== Pac-12 Conference Baseball Tournament ==
Year	Champion	MVP
2022	Stanford	Garret Forrester, Oregon State
2023	Oregon	Chase Davis, Arizona
2024	Arizona	Mason White, Arizona
