= 2022 NCAA Division I baseball season =

2022 NCAA Division I season

- Duration: February 18 – June 26, 2022
- Number of teams: 301

Tournament
- Duration: June 3–26, 2022
- Most conference bids: ACC & SEC (9)

College World Series
- Champions: Ole Miss (1st title)
- Runners-up: Oklahoma (11th CWS Appearance)
- Winning coach: Mike Bianco (1st title)
- MOP: Dylan DeLucia, Ole Miss

Seasons
- ← 2021 2023 →

The 2022 NCAA Division I baseball season was a college baseball season in the United States organized by the National Collegiate Athletic Association (NCAA) at the Division I level. It began on February 18, 2022, with play progressing through the regular season, various conference tournaments and championship series, and concluding with the 2022 NCAA Division I baseball tournament and 2022 Men's College World Series. The Men's College World Series, consisting of the eight remaining teams in the NCAA tournament and held annually in Omaha, Nebraska, at Charles Schwab Field Omaha, ended on June 26, 2022.

== Realignment ==
The following schools changed conferences effective with the 2022 season:

- Five schools left the Southland Conference. Abilene Christian, Lamar, Sam Houston, and Stephen F. Austin joined the Western Athletic Conference, and Central Arkansas joined the ASUN Conference.
- The Mid-Eastern Athletic Conference (MEAC) lost three members. Bethune–Cookman and Florida A&M joined the Southwestern Athletic Conference, and North Carolina A&T joined the Big South Conference.
- The Ohio Valley Conference lost Eastern Kentucky and Jacksonville State to the ASUN.
- Northern Colorado, a WAC baseball associate through the 2021 season, left for single-sport membership in the Summit League.
- St. Thomas, formerly of NCAA Division III's Minnesota Intercollegiate Athletic Conference, also joined the Summit League after successfully obtaining an NCAA waiver for a direct transition to D-I.

The 2022 season proved to be the last for MEAC baseball for the immediate future. On July 12, 2022, the Northeast Conference (NEC) and MEAC announced a partnership in which all MEAC members that sponsored baseball and men's and women's golf became NEC affiliates in those sports effective immediately. Accordingly, Coppin State, Delaware State, Maryland Eastern Shore, and Norfolk State became NEC baseball affiliates for the 2023 season and beyond.

In addition to the aforementioned MEAC members, 18 other teams changed conferences after the 2022 season:

- Austin Peay, Belmont, and Murray State left the Ohio Valley Conference. Peay joined the ASUN Conference, and Belmont and Murray State joined the Missouri Valley Conference (MVC).
- Bryant and Mount St. Mary's left the NEC, respectively for the America East Conference and Metro Atlantic Athletic Conference (MAAC).
- Dallas Baptist, a baseball-only member of the MVC, left for Conference USA (C-USA).
- Hartford, which began a transition to NCAA Division III in the 2021–22 school year, left the America East to become an independent for 2022–23 before joining the D-III Commonwealth Coast Conference in 2023.
- James Madison left the Colonial Athletic Association (CAA) for the Sun Belt Conference (SBC).
- Lamar, which had announced it would leave the WAC to return to its former home of the Southland Conference (SLC) in 2023–24, expedited this move to 2022–23.
- Little Rock and UT Arlington left the SBC, respectively for the OVC and WAC.
- Marshall, Old Dominion, and Southern Miss left C-USA for the SBC.
- Monmouth left the MAAC for the CAA.
- North Carolina A&T left the Big South Conference after only one season for the CAA.
- Stony Brook left the America East for the CAA.
- UIC left the Horizon League for the MVC.

Incarnate Word had announced plans to leave the SLC for the WAC after the 2022 season, but days before that move was to take effect, the school announced it was staying in the SLC.

== Conference standings ==
2022 America East Conference baseball standings
	Conf.				Overall
Team	W		L	PCT	W		L	PCT
Division A
Maine ^{x}‍‍‍	21	–	9	.700	27	–	22	.551
UMass Lowell ‍‍‍	15	–	15	.500	28	–	30	.483
Hartford ‍‍‍	11	–	19	.367	13	–	37	.260
Albany ‍‍‍	11	–	19	.367	22	–	25	.468
Division B
Stony Brook* ^{x}‍‍‍	21	–	9	.700	27	–	25	.519
Binghamton ‍‍‡‍^{y}	15	–	15	.500	22	–	28	.440
NJIT ‍‍‍	15	–	15	.500	26	–	27	.491
UMBC ‍‍‍	11	–	19	.367	23	–	32	.418
x – Division champion ‡ – Tournament champion y – Invited to the NCAA tournament *Ineligible for the 2022 Tournament due to postseason ban imposed for announcing move to the Colonial for 2022-2023. Rankings from D1Baseball

2022 American Athletic Conference baseball standings
	Conf.						Overall
Team	W		L		T	PCT	W		L		T	PCT
No. 10 East Carolina ‍†‍‡‍^{y}	20	–	4	–	0	.833	42	–	18	–	0	.700
UCF ‍‍‍	14	–	10	–	0	.583	35	–	25	–	0	.583
Houston ‍‍‍	13	–	11	–	0	.542	37	–	24	–	0	.607
Cincinnati ‍‍‍	12	–	12	–	0	.500	24	–	31	–	0	.436
Tulane ‍‍‍	11	–	13	–	0	.458	33	–	26	–	1	.558
Wichita State ‍‍‍	9	–	15	–	0	.375	21	–	36	–	0	.368
Memphis ‍‍‍	9	–	15	–	0	.375	26	–	29	–	0	.473
South Florida ‍‍‍	8	–	16	–	0	.333	28	–	29	–	0	.491
† – Conference champion ‡ – Tournament champion y – Invited to the NCAA tournament Rankings from D1Baseball

2022 Atlantic 10 Conference baseball standings
	Conf.						Overall
Team	W		L		T	PCT	W		L		T	PCT
Davidson ‍†‍‍	20	–	4	–	0	.833	43	–	13	–	0	.768
VCU ‍‍‡‍^{y}	19	–	5	–	0	.792	42	–	20	–	0	.677
Saint Louis ‍‍‍	14	–	9	–	0	.609	29	–	24	–	0	.547
Rhode Island ‍‍‍	14	–	10	–	0	.583	20	–	35	–	0	.364
George Mason ‍‍‍	13	–	11	–	0	.542	23	–	33	–	0	.411
Saint Joseph's ‍‍‍	12	–	11	–	0	.522	29	–	25	–	0	.537
Richmond ‍‍‍	11	–	13	–	0	.458	30	–	26	–	0	.536
Dayton ‍‍‍	10	–	14	–	0	.417	23	–	27	–	0	.460
George Washington ‍‍‍	10	–	14	–	0	.417	22	–	30	–	0	.423
Fordham ‍‍‍	9	–	15	–	0	.375	16	–	36	–	0	.308
UMass ‍‍‍	8	–	16	–	0	.333	22	–	26	–	1	.459
St. Bonaventure ‍‍‍	3	–	21	–	0	.125	6	–	39	–	0	.133
† – Conference champion ‡ – Tournament champion y – Invited to the NCAA tournament Rankings from D1Baseball

2022 Atlantic Coast Conference baseball standings
	Conf.						Overall
Team	W		L		T	PCT	W		L		T	PCT
Atlantic
No. 12 Louisville ^{x}‍‍‍^{y}	18	–	11	–	1	.617	42	–	21	–	1	.664
No. 6 Notre Dame ‍‍‍^{y}	16	–	11	–	0	.593	41	–	17	–	0	.707
Wake Forest ‍‍‍^{y}	15	–	14	–	1	.517	41	–	19	–	1	.680
Florida State ‍‍‍^{y}	15	–	15	–	0	.500	34	–	25	–	0	.576
NC State ‍‍‍	14	–	15	–	0	.483	36	–	21	–	0	.632
Clemson ‍‍‍	13	–	16	–	0	.448	35	–	23	–	0	.603
Boston College ‍‍‍	5	–	25	–	0	.167	19	–	34	–	0	.358
Coastal
No. 11 Virginia Tech ^{x}‍‍‍^{y}	19	–	9	–	0	.679	45	–	14	–	0	.763
No. 20 Miami (FL) ‍‍‍^{y}	20	–	10	–	0	.667	40	–	19	–	0	.678
Virginia ‍‍‍^{y}	17	–	13	–	0	.567	39	–	19	–	0	.672
No. 14 North Carolina ‍‍‡‍^{y}	15	–	15	–	0	.500	42	–	22	–	0	.656
Georgia Tech ‍‍‍^{y}	15	–	15	–	0	.500	36	–	24	–	0	.600
Pittsburgh ‍‍‍	13	–	16	–	0	.448	29	–	27	–	0	.518
Duke ‍‍‍	10	–	20	–	0	.333	22	–	32	–	0	.407
x – Division champion ‡ – Tournament champion y – Invited to the NCAA tournament As of June 27, 2022; Rankings from D1Baseball

2022 ASUN Conference baseball standings
	Conf.				Overall
Team	W		L	PCT	W		L	PCT
East
Kennesaw State ^{x}‍‍‡‍^{y}	19	–	11	.633	35	–	26	.574
Liberty ^{x}‍‍‍^{y}	19	–	11	.633	37	–	21	.638
Florida Gulf Coast ‍‍‍	17	–	13	.567	35	–	23	.603
Jacksonville ‍‍‍	13	–	16	.448	27	–	28	.491
North Florida ‍‍‍	11	–	18	.379	22	–	33	.400
Stetson ‍‍‍	10	–	20	.333	26	–	29	.473
West
Eastern Kentucky ^{x}‍‍‍	20	–	10	.667	38	–	20	.655
Lipscomb ^{x}‍‍‍	20	–	10	.667	35	–	23	.603
Jacksonville State ‍‍‍	19	–	11	.633	27	–	28	.491
Central Arkansas ‍‍‍	18	–	12	.600	24	–	29	.453
Bellarmine ‍‍‍	8	–	22	.267	11	–	43	.204
North Alabama ‍‍‍	5	–	25	.167	12	–	41	.226
x – Division champion ‡ – Tournament champion y – Invited to the NCAA tournament Rankings from D1Baseball

2022 Big East Conference baseball standings
	Conf.						Overall
Team	W		L		T	PCT	W		L		T	PCT
No. 16 UConn ‍†‍‡‍^{y}	16	–	5	–	0	.762	50	–	16	–	0	.758
Creighton ‍‍‍	15	–	5	–	0	.750	31	–	18	–	0	.633
Xavier ‍‍‍	13	–	8	–	0	.619	33	–	27	–	0	.550
Georgetown ‍‍‍	11	–	10	–	0	.524	32	–	24	–	0	.571
Villanova ‍‍‍	8	–	12	–	0	.400	19	–	29	–	1	.398
St. John's ‍‍‍	7	–	12	–	1	.375	22	–	32	–	1	.409
Seton Hall ‍‍‍	7	–	13	–	0	.350	18	–	35	–	0	.340
Butler ‍‍‍	4	–	16	–	1	.214	20	–	35	–	1	.366
† – Conference champion ‡ – Tournament champion y – Invited to the NCAA tournament As of June 27, 2022; Rankings from D1Baseball

2022 Big South Conference baseball standings
	Conf.						Overall
Team	W		L		T	PCT	W		L		T	PCT
Campbell ‍†‍‡‍^{y}	20	–	3	–	0	.870	36	–	16	–	0	.692
USC Upstate ‍‍‍	17	–	6	–	1	.729	34	–	20	–	1	.627
UNC Asheville ‍‍‍	14	–	9	–	1	.604	20	–	28	–	1	.418
High Point ‍‍‍	14	–	10	–	0	.583	23	–	32	–	0	.418
Charleston Southern ‍‍‍	13	–	11	–	0	.542	22	–	28	–	0	.440
Gardner–Webb ‍‍‍	11	–	13	–	0	.458	23	–	34	–	0	.404
Winthrop ‍‍‍	11	–	13	–	0	.458	18	–	34	–	0	.346
Longwood ‍‍‍	10	–	14	–	0	.417	20	–	33	–	0	.377
Presbyterian ‍‍‍	9	–	15	–	0	.375	22	–	32	–	0	.407
Radford ‍‍‍	8	–	15	–	0	.348	15	–	33	–	0	.313
North Carolina A&T ‍‍‍	3	–	21	–	0	.125	15	–	38	–	0	.283
† – Conference champion ‡ – Tournament champion y – Invited to the NCAA tournament Rankings from D1Baseball

2022 Big Ten Conference baseball standings
	Conf.				Overall
Team	W		L	PCT	W		L	PCT
No. 12 Maryland ‍†‍‍^{y}	18	–	5	.783	48	–	13	.787
Rutgers ‍‍‍	17	–	7	.708	44	–	15	.746
Iowa ‍‍‍	17	–	7	.708	36	–	19	.655
Illinois ‍‍‍	17	–	7	.708	31	–	22	.585
Michigan ‍‍‡‍^{y}	12	–	12	.500	34	–	28	.548
Penn State ‍‍‍	11	–	13	.458	26	–	29	.473
Purdue ‍‍‍	9	–	12	.429	29	–	21	.580
Indiana ‍‍‍	10	–	14	.417	27	–	32	.458
Northwestern ‍‍‍	10	–	14	.417	24	–	27	.471
Nebraska ‍‍‍	10	–	14	.417	23	–	30	.434
Ohio State ‍‍‍	8	–	14	.364	21	–	30	.412
Michigan State ‍‍‍	8	–	16	.333	24	–	30	.444
Minnesota ‍‍‍	6	–	18	.250	16	–	36	.308
† – Conference champion ‡ – Tournament champion y – Invited to the NCAA tournament As of June 6, 2022; Rankings from D1Baseball

2022 Big 12 Conference baseball standings
	Conf.				Overall
Team	W		L	PCT	W		L	PCT
No. 23 TCU ‍†‍‍^{y}	16	–	8	.667	38	–	22	.633
Oklahoma State ‍‍‍^{y}	15	–	9	.625	42	–	22	.656
No. 2 Oklahoma ‍‍‡‍^{y}	15	–	9	.625	45	–	24	.652
No. 24 Texas Tech ‍‍‍^{y}	15	–	9	.625	39	–	22	.639
No. 8 Texas ‍‍‍^{y}	14	–	10	.583	47	–	22	.681
West Virginia ‍‍‍	14	–	10	.583	33	–	22	.600
Kansas State ‍‍‍	8	–	16	.333	29	–	29	.500
Baylor ‍‍‍	7	–	17	.292	26	–	28	.481
Kansas ‍‍‍	4	–	20	.167	20	–	35	.364
† – Conference champion ‡ – Tournament champion y – Invited to the NCAA tournament Rankings from D1baseball

2022 Big West Conference baseball standings
	Conf.				Overall
Team	W		L	PCT	W		L	PCT
No. 20 UC Santa Barbara ‍†‍‍^{y}	27	–	3	.900	43	–	12	.782
Cal Poly ‍‍‍	22	–	8	.733	37	–	21	.638
Hawaii ‍‍‍	19	–	11	.633	28	–	24	.538
Cal State Northridge ‍‍‍	17	–	13	.567	32	–	22	.593
Long Beach State ‍‍‍	17	–	13	.567	29	–	27	.518
UC Irvine ‍‍‍	16	–	14	.533	32	–	24	.571
Cal State Fullerton ‍‍‍	14	–	16	.467	22	–	33	.400
UC San Diego ‍‍‍	13	–	17	.433	24	–	32	.429
Cal State Bakersfield ‍‍‍	11	–	19	.367	18	–	34	.346
UC Davis ‍‍‍	5	–	25	.167	6	–	35	.146
UC Riverside ‍‍‍	4	–	26	.133	8	–	45	.151
† – Conference champion y – Invited to the NCAA tournament Rankings from D1Baseball

2022 Colonial Athletic Association baseball standings
	Conf.						Overall
Team	W		L		T	PCT	W		L		T	PCT
College of Charleston ‍†‍‍	19	–	5	–	0	.792	37	–	20	–	0	.649
UNC Wilmington ‍‍‍	15	–	9	–	0	.625	31	–	24	–	0	.564
Hofstra ‍‍‡‍^{y}	15	–	9	–	0	.625	30	–	21	–	0	.588
William & Mary ‍‍‍	14	–	10	–	0	.583	26	–	23	–	0	.531
James Madison* ‍‍‍	12	–	11	–	0	.522	27	–	26	–	0	.509
Northeastern ‍‍‍	10	–	14	–	0	.417	31	–	29	–	1	.516
Elon ‍‍‍	9	–	14	–	0	.391	27	–	28	–	0	.491
Delaware ‍‍‍	8	–	15	–	0	.348	26	–	26	–	0	.500
Towson ‍‍‍	4	–	19	–	0	.174	14	–	39	–	0	.264
x – Division champion ‡ – Tournament champion y – Invited to the NCAA tournament *Ineligible for the 2022 Tournament due to postseason ban imposed by the CAA. Rankings from D1Baseball

2022 Conference USA baseball standings
	Conf.						Overall
Team	W		L		T	PCT	W		L		T	PCT
No. 15 Southern Miss ‍†‍‍^{y}	23	–	7	–	0	.767	43	–	16	–	0	.729
Louisiana Tech ‍‍‡‍^{y}	20	–	10	–	0	.667	42	–	19	–	0	.689
Old Dominion ‍‍‍	19	–	11	–	0	.633	41	–	17	–	0	.707
Florida Atlantic ‍‍‍	19	–	11	–	0	.633	35	–	23	–	0	.603
UTSA ‍‍‍	19	–	11	–	0	.633	38	–	20	–	0	.655
Middle Tennessee ‍‍‍	17	–	13	–	0	.567	29	–	26	–	0	.527
Charlotte ‍‍‍	17	–	13	–	0	.567	36	–	22	–	0	.621
UAB ‍‍‍	13	–	17	–	0	.433	31	–	25	–	0	.554
Rice ‍‍‍	9	–	21	–	0	.300	17	–	39	–	0	.304
Marshall ‍‍‍	9	–	21	–	0	.300	20	–	34	–	1	.373
FIU ‍‍‍	8	–	22	–	0	.267	16	–	34	–	0	.320
Western Kentucky ‍‍‍	7	–	23	–	0	.233	18	–	36	–	0	.333
† – Conference champion ‡ – Tournament champion y – Invited to the NCAA tournament Rankings from D1Baseball

2022 Horizon League baseball standings
	Conf.				Overall
Team	W		L	PCT	W		L	PCT
Wright State ‍†‍‡‍^{y}	20	–	9	.690	30	–	25	.545
Oakland ‍‍‍	18	–	11	.621	31	–	27	.534
UIC ‍‍‍	14	–	11	.560	22	–	25	.468
Purdue Fort Wayne ‍‍‍	13	–	15	.464	18	–	36	.333
Youngstown State ‍‍‍	12	–	16	.429	21	–	36	.368
Northern Kentucky ‍‍‍	11	–	17	.393	19	–	35	.352
Milwaukee ‍‍‍	9	–	17	.346	20	–	29	.408
† – Conference champion ‡ – Tournament champion y – Invited to the NCAA tournament Rankings from D1Baseball

2022 Ivy League baseball standings
	Conf.				Overall
Team	W		L	PCT	W		L	PCT
Penn ‍†‍‍	17	–	4	.810	33	–	15	.688
Columbia ‍‍‡‍^{y}	15	–	4	.789	30	–	16	.652
Dartmouth ‍‍‍	14	–	7	.667	24	–	19	.558
Yale ‍‍‍	10	–	11	.476	20	–	18	.526
Harvard ‍‍‍	10	–	11	.476	19	–	22	.463
Brown ‍‍‍	8	–	13	.381	13	–	23	.361
Cornell ‍‍‍	5	–	14	.263	11	–	25	.306
Princeton ‍‍‍	3	–	18	.143	7	–	33	.175
† – Conference champion ‡ – Championship Series champion y – Invited to the NCAA tournament Rankings from D1Baseball

2022 Metro Atlantic Athletic Conference baseball standings
	Conf.				Overall
Team	W		L	PCT	W		L	PCT
Fairfield ‍†‍‍	18	–	5	.783	31	–	20	.608
Marist ‍‍‍	17	–	5	.773	29	–	17	.630
Canisius ‍‍‡‍^{y}	15	–	9	.625	29	–	23	.558
Monmouth ‍‍‍	12	–	10	.545	24	–	27	.471
Rider ‍‍‍	12	–	10	.545	28	–	26	.519
Niagara ‍‍‍	13	–	11	.542	22	–	32	.407
Manhattan ‍‍‍	12	–	12	.500	24	–	26	.480
Quinnipiac ‍‍‍	8	–	15	.348	15	–	33	.313
Siena ‍‍‍	8	–	15	.348	11	–	37	.229
Saint Peter's ‍‍‍	6	–	17	.261	9	–	41	.180
Iona ‍‍‍	6	–	18	.250	6	–	41	.128
† – Conference champion ‡ – Tournament champion y – Invited to the NCAA tournament Rankings from D1Baseball

2022 Mid-American Conference baseball standings
	Conf.				Overall
Team	W		L	PCT	W		L	PCT
Ball State ‍†‍‍	32	–	7	.821	40	–	19	.678
Central Michigan ‍‍‡‍^{y}	30	–	7	.811	42	–	17	.712
Toledo ‍‍‍	23	–	16	.590	33	–	25	.569
Ohio ‍‍‍	21	–	15	.583	30	–	24	.556
Kent State ‍‍‍	19	–	19	.500	24	–	29	.453
Miami (OH) ‍‍‍	18	–	22	.450	23	–	33	.411
Eastern Michigan ‍‍‍	16	–	24	.400	22	–	34	.393
Western Michigan ‍‍‍	15	–	24	.385	18	–	36	.333
Bowling Green ‍‍‍	14	–	24	.368	18	–	35	.340
Northern Illinois ‍‍‍	13	–	25	.342	14	–	40	.259
Akron ‍‍‍	11	–	29	.275	15	–	41	.268
† – Conference champion ‡ – Tournament champion y – Invited to the NCAA tournament Rankings from D1Baseball

2022 Mid-Eastern Athletic Conference baseball standings
	Conf.				Overall
Team	W		L	PCT	W		L	PCT
Delaware State ‍†‍‍	19	–	14	.576	26	–	23	.531
Coppin State ‍‍‡‍^{y}	17	–	13	.567	24	–	29	.453
Maryland Eastern Shore ‍‍‍	15	–	18	.455	17	–	38	.309
Norfolk State ‍‍‍	12	–	18	.400	15	–	32	.319
‡ – Tournament champion y – Invited to the NCAA tournament Rankings from D1Baseball

2022 Missouri Valley Conference baseball standings
	Conf.						Overall
Team	W		L		T	PCT	W		L		T	PCT
Southern Illinois ‍†‍‍	16	–	5	–	0	.762	44	–	16	–	0	.733
Evansville ‍‍‍	14	–	6	–	0	.700	32	–	24	–	0	.571
Dallas Baptist ‍‍‍^{y}	11	–	9	–	1	.548	34	–	22	–	1	.605
Bradley ‍‍‍	11	–	10	–	0	.524	20	–	29	–	0	.408
Indiana State ‍‍‍	10	–	10	–	1	.500	26	–	22	–	1	.541
Missouri State ‍‍‡‍^{y}	8	–	13	–	0	.381	30	–	27	–	0	.526
Illinois State ‍‍‍	7	–	14	–	0	.333	20	–	31	–	0	.392
Valparaiso ‍‍‍	5	–	15	–	0	.250	16	–	32	–	0	.333
† – Conference champion ‡ – Tournament champion y – Invited to the NCAA tournament Rankings from D1Baseball

2022 Mountain West Conference baseball standings
	Conf.				Overall
Team	W		L	PCT	W		L	PCT
UNLV ‍†‍‍	21	–	9	.700	36	–	22	.621
Nevada ‍‍‍	18	–	12	.600	29	–	26	.527
San Jose State ‍‍‍	16	–	14	.533	30	–	29	.508
Air Force ‍‍‡‍^{y}	15	–	15	.500	30	–	27	.526
Fresno State ‍‍‍	15	–	15	.500	27	–	28	.491
New Mexico ‍‍‍	10	–	20	.333	21	–	33	.389
San Diego State ‍‍‍	10	–	20	.333	18	–	38	.321
† – Conference champion ‡ – Tournament champion y – Invited to the NCAA tournament Rankings from D1Baseball

2022 Northeast Conference baseball standings
	Conf.						Overall
Team	W		L		T	PCT	W		L		T	PCT
LIU ‍†‍‡‍^{y}	18	–	9	–	0	.667	37	–	19	–	0	.661
Bryant ‍‍‍	17	–	10	–	0	.630	30	–	27	–	0	.526
Central Connecticut ‍‍‍	17	–	10	–	0	.630	29	–	18	–	0	.617
Fairleigh Dickinson ‍‍‍	16	–	11	–	0	.593	24	–	30	–	0	.444
Merrimack ‍‍‍	12	–	15	–	0	.444	17	–	31	–	1	.357
Wagner ‍‍‍	12	–	15	–	0	.444	17	–	34	–	0	.333
Sacred Heart ‍‍‍	9	–	18	–	0	.333	12	–	41	–	0	.226
Mount St. Mary's ‍‍‍	7	–	20	–	0	.259	14	–	34	–	0	.292
† – Conference champion ‡ – Tournament champion y – Invited to the NCAA tournament Rankings from D1Baseball

2022 Ohio Valley Conference baseball standings
	Conf.				Overall
Team	W		L	PCT	W		L	PCT
Belmont ‍†‍‍	18	–	5	.783	39	–	20	.661
Southeast Missouri State ‍‍‡‍^{y}	16	–	8	.667	37	–	20	.649
Morehead State ‍‍‍	14	–	10	.583	27	–	27	.500
Eastern Illinois ‍‍‍	12	–	12	.500	33	–	20	.623
SIU Edwardsville ‍‍‍	11	–	12	.478	27	–	28	.491
Tennessee Tech ‍‍‍	11	–	13	.458	21	–	16	.568
Murray State ‍‍‍	11	–	13	.458	30	–	25	.545
Austin Peay ‍‍‍	10	–	14	.417	19	–	37	.339
UT Martin ‍‍‍	4	–	20	.167	11	–	34	.244
‡ – Tournament champion y – Invited to the NCAA tournament Rankings from D1Baseball

2022 Pac-12 Conference baseball standings
	Conf.						Overall
Team	W		L		T	PCT	W		L		T	PCT
No. 2 Stanford ‍†‍‡‍^{y}	21	–	9	–	0	.700	47	–	16	–	0	.746
No. 3 Oregon State ‍‍‍^{y}	20	–	10	–	0	.667	48	–	18	–	0	.727
No. 19 UCLA ‍‍‍^{y}	19	–	11	–	0	.633	40	–	24	–	0	.625
Oregon ‍‍‍^{y}	18	–	12	–	0	.600	36	–	25	–	0	.590
Arizona ‍‍‍^{y}	16	–	14	–	0	.533	39	–	25	–	0	.609
Washington ‍‍‍	14	–	16	–	0	.467	30	–	26	–	0	.536
California ‍‍‍	14	–	16	–	0	.467	29	–	27	–	0	.518
Arizona State ‍‍‍	13	–	17	–	0	.433	26	–	31	–	0	.456
Washington State ‍‍‍	12	–	18	–	0	.400	27	–	26	–	0	.509
Utah ‍‍‍	10	–	20	–	0	.333	26	–	27	–	1	.491
USC ‍‍‍	8	–	22	–	0	.267	25	–	28	–	0	.472
† – Conference champion ‡ – Tournament champion y – Invited to the NCAA tournament As of June 13, 2022; Rankings from D1Baseball

2022 Patriot League baseball standings
	Conf.				Overall
Team	W		L	PCT	W		L	PCT
Army ‍†‍‡‍^{y}	18	–	7	.720	31	–	23	.574
Bucknell ‍‍‍	14	–	11	.560	22	–	26	.458
Lehigh ‍‍‍	12	–	13	.480	26	–	24	.520
Holy Cross ‍‍‍	11	–	14	.440	17	–	37	.315
Navy ‍‍‍	10	–	15	.400	19	–	26	.422
Lafayette ‍‍‍	10	–	15	.400	15	–	35	.300
† – Conference champion ‡ – Tournament champion y – Invited to the NCAA tournament Rankings from D1Baseball

2022 Southeastern Conference baseball standings
	Conf.				Overall
Team	W		L	PCT	W		L	PCT
Eastern
No. 9 Tennessee ^{x}‍†‍‡‍^{y}	25	–	5	.833	57	–	9	.864
No. 21 Florida ‍‍‍^{y}	15	–	15	.500	42	–	24	.636
Georgia ‍‍‍^{y}	15	–	15	.500	36	–	23	.610
Vanderbilt ‍‍‍^{y}	14	–	16	.467	39	–	23	.629
South Carolina ‍‍‍	13	–	17	.433	27	–	28	.491
Kentucky ‍‍‍	12	–	18	.400	33	–	26	.559
Missouri ‍‍‍	10	–	20	.333	28	–	23	.549
Western
No. 3 Texas A&M ^{x}‍‍‍^{y}	19	–	11	.633	44	–	20	.688
No. 4 Arkansas ‍‍‍^{y}	18	–	12	.600	46	–	21	.687
No. 25 LSU ‍‍‍^{y}	17	–	13	.567	40	–	22	.645
No. 7 Auburn ‍‍‍^{y}	16	–	13	.552	43	–	22	.662
No. 1 Ole Miss ‍‍‍^{y}	14	–	16	.467	42	–	23	.646
Alabama ‍‍‍	12	–	17	.414	31	–	27	.534
Mississippi State ‍‍‍	9	–	21	.300	26	–	30	.464
x – Division champion † – Conference champion ‡ – Tournament champion y – Invited to the NCAA tournament Rankings from D1Baseball

2022 Southern Conference baseball standings
	Conf.						Overall
Team	W		L		T	PCT	W		L		T	PCT
Wofford ‍†‍‍	16	–	4	–	1	.786	42	–	16	–	1	.720
Mercer ‍‍‍	12	–	9	–	0	.571	40	–	18	–	0	.690
Samford ‍‍‍	12	–	9	–	0	.571	28	–	29	–	0	.491
UNC Greensboro ‍‍‡‍^{y}	12	–	9	–	0	.571	34	–	28	–	0	.548
East Tennessee State ‍‍‍	11	–	10	–	0	.524	31	–	21	–	0	.596
Western Carolina ‍‍‍	9	–	11	–	1	.452	26	–	31	–	1	.457
VMI ‍‍‍	6	–	15	–	0	.286	16	–	40	–	0	.286
The Citadel ‍‍‍	5	–	16	–	0	.238	26	–	31	–	0	.456
† – Conference champion ‡ – Tournament champion y – Invited to the NCAA tournament Rankings from D1Baseball

2022 Southland Conference baseball standings
	Conf.				Overall
Team	W		L	PCT	W		L	PCT
McNeese State ‍†‍‍	15	–	9	.625	34	–	23	.596
Southeastern Louisiana ‍‍‡‍^{y}	14	–	10	.583	30	–	29	.508
New Orleans ‍‍‍	13	–	11	.542	30	–	23	.566
Nicholls ‍‍‍	12	–	12	.500	26	–	25	.510
Northwestern State ‍‍‍	12	–	12	.500	25	–	29	.463
Houston Baptist ‍‍‍	11	–	13	.458	18	–	36	.333
Texas A&M–Corpus Christi ‍‍‍	10	–	14	.417	27	–	28	.491
Incarnate Word ‍‍‍	9	–	15	.375	21	–	31	.404
† – Conference champion ‡ – Tournament champion y – Invited to the NCAA tournament Rankings from D1Baseball

2022 Southwestern Athletic Conference baseball standings
	Conf.						Overall
Team	W		L		T	PCT	W		L		T	PCT
East
Alabama State ^{x}‍†‍‡‍^{y}	21	–	8	–	0	.724	34	–	23	–	0	.596
Bethune–Cookman ‍‍‍	20	–	11	–	0	.645	28	–	32	–	0	.467
Florida A&M ‍‍‍	19	–	11	–	0	.633	29	–	30	–	0	.492
Jackson State ‍‍‍	16	–	14	–	0	.533	29	–	27	–	0	.518
Alabama A&M ‍‍‍	11	–	19	–	0	.367	15	–	34	–	0	.306
Mississippi Valley State ‍‍‍	4	–	24	–	0	.143	10	–	30	–	1	.256
West
Southern ^{x}‍‍‍	21	–	9	–	0	.700	27	–	31	–	0	.466
Grambling State ‍‍‍	20	–	10	–	0	.667	26	–	31	–	0	.456
Texas Southern ‍‍‍	19	–	11	–	0	.633	28	–	25	–	0	.528
Prairie View A&M ‍‍‍	19	–	11	–	0	.633	30	–	27	–	0	.526
Arkansas–Pine Bluff ‍‍‍	9	–	21	–	0	.300	13	–	36	–	1	.270
Alcorn State ‍‍‍	2	–	28	–	0	.067	2	–	39	–	0	.049
x – Division champion † – Conference champion ‡ – Tournament champion y – Invited to the NCAA tournament Rankings from Collegiate Baseball

2022 Summit League baseball standings
	Conf.				Overall
Team	W		L	PCT	W		L	PCT
North Dakota State ‍†‍‍	17	–	5	.773	31	–	19	.620
Oral Roberts ‍‍‡‍^{y}	17	–	7	.708	38	–	18	.679
South Dakota State ‍‍‍	13	–	9	.591	22	–	23	.489
Omaha ‍‍‍	12	–	12	.500	26	–	31	.456
St. Thomas* ‍‍‍	10	–	14	.417	16	–	29	.356
Northern Colorado ‍‍‍	8	–	16	.333	12	–	39	.235
Western Illinois ‍‍‍	5	–	19	.208	8	–	44	.154
† – Conference champion ‡ – Tournament champion y – Invited to the NCAA tournament * Ineligible for the 2022 NCAA tournament due to transition from Division III; Rankings from D1Baseball

2022 Sun Belt Conference baseball standings
	Conf.						Overall
Team	W		L		T	PCT	W		L		T	PCT
No. 13 Texas State ‍†‍‍^{y}	26	–	4	–	0	.867	47	–	14	–	0	.770
No. 21 Georgia Southern ‍‍‍^{y}	23	–	7	–	0	.767	41	–	20	–	0	.672
Coastal Carolina ‍‍‍^{y}	21	–	8	–	1	.717	39	–	20	–	1	.658
Louisiana ‍‍‡‍^{y}	19	–	11	–	0	.633	37	–	23	–	0	.617
South Alabama ‍‍‍	17	–	13	–	0	.567	31	–	23	–	0	.574
Troy ‍‍‍	15	–	15	–	0	.500	32	–	24	–	0	.571
Georgia State ‍‍‍	15	–	15	–	0	.500	30	–	27	–	0	.526
Little Rock ‍‍‍	11	–	18	–	0	.379	24	–	27	–	0	.471
Appalachian State ‍‍‍	10	–	20	–	0	.333	20	–	33	–	0	.377
Louisiana–Monroe ‍‍‍	9	–	20	–	1	.317	20	–	35	–	1	.366
UT Arlington ‍‍‍	7	–	23	–	0	.233	15	–	39	–	0	.278
Arkansas State ‍‍‍	5	–	24	–	0	.172	11	–	38	–	0	.224
† – Conference champion ‡ – Tournament champion y – Invited to the NCAA tournament Rankings from D1Baseball

2022 West Coast Conference baseball standings
	Conf.						Overall
Team	W		L		T	PCT	W		L		T	PCT
No. 14 Gonzaga ‍†‍‍^{y}	20	–	7	–	0	.741	36	–	17	–	0	.679
Portland ‍‍‍	17	–	10	–	0	.630	32	–	23	–	0	.582
San Diego ‍‍‡‍^{y}	17	–	10	–	0	.630	36	–	18	–	0	.667
BYU ‍‍‍	16	–	11	–	0	.593	33	–	21	–	0	.611
Loyola Marymount ‍‍‍	14	–	13	–	0	.519	20	–	34	–	1	.373
San Francisco ‍‍‍	14	–	13	–	0	.519	28	–	29	–	0	.491
Pepperdine ‍‍‍	12	–	15	–	0	.444	24	–	26	–	0	.480
Santa Clara ‍‍‍	11	–	16	–	0	.407	24	–	29	–	0	.453
Saint Mary's ‍‍‍	9	–	18	–	0	.333	25	–	30	–	0	.455
Pacific ‍‍‍	5	–	22	–	0	.185	14	–	38	–	0	.269
† – Conference champion ‡ – Tournament champion y – Invited to the NCAA tournament Rankings from D1Baseball

2022 Western Athletic Conference baseball standings
	Conf.				Overall
Team	W		L	PCT	W		L	PCT
Southwest
Sam Houston State ^{x}‍‍‍	21	–	9	.700	31	–	25	.554
Lamar ‍‍‍	20	–	10	.667	37	–	21	.638
UTRGV ‍‍‍	17	–	13	.567	33	–	25	.569
Abilene Christian ‍‍‍	14	–	16	.467	30	–	29	.508
Tarleton State* ‍‍‍	10	–	20	.333	17	–	36	.321
Stephen F. Austin ‍‍‍	8	–	22	.267	15	–	37	.288
West
Grand Canyon ^{x}‍†‍‍^{y}	25	–	5	.833	41	–	19	.683
California Baptist* ‍‍‍	18	–	12	.600	36	–	20	.643
Sacramento State ‍‍‍	17	–	13	.567	32	–	26	.552
Dixie State* ‍‍‍	14	–	16	.467	22	–	33	.400
Seattle ‍‍‍	11	–	19	.367	16	–	34	.320
New Mexico State ‍‍‡‍^{y}	10	–	20	.333	24	–	32	.429
Utah Valley ‍‍‍	10	–	20	.333	19	–	37	.339
x – Division champion † – Conference champion ‡ – Tournament champion y – Invited to the NCAA tournament * ineligible for the 2022 NCAA tournament due to transition from Division II; Rankings from D1Baseball

=== Conference winners and tournaments ===
Thirty athletic conferences each end their regular seasons with a single-elimination tournament or a double-elimination tournament. The teams in each conference that win their regular season title are given the number one seed in each tournament. The winners of these tournaments receive automatic invitations to the 2022 NCAA Division I baseball tournament.

Conference	Regular season winner	Conference Player of the Year	Conference Pitcher of the Year	Conference Coach of the Year	Conference tournament	Tournament venue (city)	Tournament winner
America East Conference	Division A - Maine; Division B - Stony Brook (Note: Ineligible for postseason tournament due to conference imposed ban in response to their exit from the America East Conference.)	Evan Giordano, Stony Brook	Ryan Fischer, NJIT	Nick Derba, Maine	2022 America East Conference baseball tournament	Mahaney Diamond • Orono, ME	Binghamton
American Athletic Conference	East Carolina	Griffin Merritt, Cincinnati	Carter Spivey, East Carolina	Cliff Godwin, East Carolina	2022 American Athletic Conference baseball tournament	BayCare Ballpark • Clearwater, FL	East Carolina
ASUN Conference	East - Kennesaw State/Liberty; West - Eastern Kentucky/Lipscomb	Matt Higgins, Bellarmine	Tyler Cleveland, Central Arkansas	Jeff Forehand, Lipscomb	2022 ASUN Conference baseball tournament	Swanson Stadium • Fort Myers, FL	Kennesaw State
Atlantic 10 Conference	Davidson	Michael Carico, Davidson	Blake Hely, Davidson	Rucker Taylor, Davidson	2022 Atlantic 10 Conference baseball tournament	Wilson Field • Davidson, NC	VCU
Atlantic Coast Conference	Atlantic - Louisville; Coastal - Virginia Tech	Max Wagner, Clemson	Rhett Lowder, Wake Forest	John Szefc, Virginia Tech	2022 Atlantic Coast Conference baseball tournament	Truist Field • Charlotte, NC	North Carolina
Big 12 Conference	TCU	Ivan Melendez, Texas	Brandon Birdsell, Texas Tech	Kirk Saarloos, TCU	2022 Big 12 Conference baseball tournament	Globe Life Field • Arlington, TX	Oklahoma
Big East Conference	UConn	Luke Franzoni, Xavier & Alan Roden, Creighton	Dylan Tebrake, Creighton	Georgetown (Edwin Thompson) (Note: The Big East's end-of-season coaching award is officially styled as the "Coaching Staff of the Year" award and is presented to the entire honored staff. The head coach is specifically named in the award announcement.)	2022 Big East Conference baseball tournament	Prasco Park • Mason, OH	UConn
Big South Conference	Campbell	Zach Neto, Campbell	Thomas Harrington, Campbell	Justin Haire, Campbell	2022 Big South Conference baseball tournament	Truist Point • High Point, NC	Campbell
Big Ten Conference	Maryland	Chris Alleyne, Maryland	Adam Mazur, Iowa	Rob Vaughn, Maryland	2022 Big Ten Conference baseball tournament	Charles Schwab Field Omaha • Omaha, NE	Michigan
Big West Conference	UC Santa Barbara	Brooks Lee, Cal Poly (Note: The Big West styles this award as "Field Player of the Year".)	Drew Thorpe, Cal Poly	Andrew Checketts, UC Santa Barbara	No tournament, regular season champion earns auto bid		
Colonial Athletic Association	Charleston	Brooks Baldwin, UNCW	William Privette, Charleston	Chad Holbrook, Charleston	2022 Colonial Athletic Association baseball tournament	Latham Park • Elon, NC	Hofstra
Conference USA	Southern Miss	Matt Coutney, Old Dominion	Tanner Hall, Southern Miss	Scott Berry, Southern Miss	2022 Conference USA baseball tournament	Pete Taylor Park • Hattiesburg, MS	Louisiana Tech
Horizon League	Wright State	Alec Sayre, Wright State	Matt Brosky, Youngstown State	Jordon Banfield Oakland	2022 Horizon League baseball tournament	Nischwitz Stadium • Fairborn, OH	Wright State
Ivy League	Penn	Kade Kretzschmar, Dartmouth	Kevin Eaise, Penn	Brett Boretti, Columbia	2022 Ivy League Baseball Championship Series	Meiklejohn Stadium • Philadelphia, PA	Columbia
Metro Atlantic Athletic Conference	Fairfield	Max Grant, Canisius	Trey Dombroski, Monmouth	Chris Tracz, Marist	2022 Metro Atlantic Athletic Conference baseball tournament	Clover Stadium • Pomona, NY	Canisius
Mid-American Conference	Ball State	Matt Kirk, Eastern Michigan	Tyler Schweitzer, Ball State	Rich Maloney, Ball State	2022 Mid-American Conference baseball tournament	Campus Sites	Central Michigan
Mid-Eastern Athletic Conference	Delaware State	Trey Paige, Delaware State	Jordan Hamberg, Coppin State	J. P. Blandin, Delaware State	2022 Mid-Eastern Athletic Conference baseball tournament	Marty L. Miller Field • Norfolk, VA	Coppin State
Missouri Valley Conference	Southern Illinois	Kaeber Rog, Southern Illinois	Nick Smith, Evansville	Wes Carroll, Evansville	2022 Missouri Valley Conference baseball tournament	Hammons Field • Springfield, MO	Missouri State
Mountain West Conference	UNLV	Sam Kulasingam, Air Force	Troy Melton, San Diego State & Paul Skenes, Air Force	Stan Stolte, UNLV	2022 Mountain West Conference baseball tournament	Tony Gwynn Stadium • San Diego, CA	Air Force
Northeast Conference	LIU	Matt Woods, Bryant	Joshua Loeschorn, LIU	Dan Pirillo, LIU	2022 Northeast Conference baseball tournament	Dodd Stadium • Norwich, CT	LIU
Ohio Valley Conference	Belmont	Guy Lipscomb, Belmont	Andy Bean, Belmont	Dave Jarvis, Belmont	2022 Ohio Valley Conference baseball tournament	Wild Health Field • Lexington, KY	Southeast Missouri State
Pac-12 Conference	Stanford	Jacob Melton, Oregon State	Alex Williams, Stanford	David Esquer, Stanford	2022 Pac-12 Conference baseball tournament	Scottsdale Stadium • Scottsdale, AZ	Stanford
Patriot League	Army	Casey Rother, Lehigh	Connelly Early, Army	Jim Foster, Army	2022 Patriot League baseball tournament	Campus Sites	Army
Southeastern Conference	East – Tennessee; West – Texas A&M	Dylan Crews, LSU & Sonny DiChiara, Auburn	Chase Dollander, Tennessee	Tony Vitello, Tennessee	2022 Southeastern Conference baseball tournament	Hoover Metropolitan Stadium • Hoover, AL	Tennessee
Southern Conference	Wofford	Hogan Windish, UNC Greensboro	Alex Hoppe, UNC Greensboro	Todd Interdonato, Wofford	2022 Southern Conference baseball tournament	Fluor Field at the West End • Greenville, SC	UNC Greensboro
Southland Conference	McNeese	Payton Harden, McNeese	Starter: Grant Rogers, McNeese; Reliever: Cameron Foster, McNeese	Justin Hill, McNeese	2022 Southland Conference baseball tournament	Campus Sites	Southeastern Louisiana
Southwestern Athletic Conference	East - Alabama State; West - Southern	Corey King, Alabama State	Shemar Page, Grambling State	José Vázquez, Alabama State	2022 Southwestern Athletic Conference baseball tournament	Regions Field • Birmingham, AL	Alabama State
Summit League	North Dakota State	Mike Boeve, Omaha	Ledgend Smith, Oral Roberts	Tyler Oakes, North Dakota State	2022 Summit League baseball tournament	J. L. Johnson Stadium • Tulsa, OK	Oral Roberts
Sun Belt Conference	Texas State	Dalton Shuffield, Texas State	Reid VanScoter, Coastal Carolina	Steven Trout, Texas State	2022 Sun Belt Conference baseball tournament	Riverwalk Stadium • Montgomery, AL	Louisiana
West Coast Conference	Gonzaga	Caleb Ricketts, San Diego	Brett Gillis, Portland	Mark Machtolf, Gonzaga	2022 West Coast Conference baseball tournament	Banner Island Ballpark • Stockton, CA	San Diego
Western Athletic Conference	Southwest -Sam Houston; West - Grand Canyon	Carlos Contreras, Sam Houston	Daniel Avitia, Grand Canyon	Andy Stankiewicz, Grand Canyon	2022 Western Athletic Conference baseball tournament	HoHoKam Stadium • Mesa, AZ	New Mexico State

== Coaching changes ==
This table lists programs that changed head coaches at any point from the first day of the 2022 season until the day before the first day of the 2023 season.

Team	Former coach	Interim coach	New coach	Reason
Austin Peay	Travis Janssen	Trevor Fitt	Roland Fanning	Performance
BYU	Mike Littlewood	Trent Pratt		Personal
Kansas	Ritch Price	none	Dan Fitzgerald	Retired.
San Francisco	Nino Giarratano	Mat Keplinger	Rob DiToma	Sexual conduct scandal
Clemson	Monte Lee	None	Erik Bakich	Performance
Marshall	Jeff Waggoner	N/A	Greg Beals	Performance

== See also ==
- 2022 NCAA Division I softball season
