= Robbie McClellan =

American baseball player and coach (born 1981)

Current position
- Title: Head coach
- Team: NJIT
- Conference: America East
- Record: 167–204–2

Biographical details
- Born: January 31, 1981 (age 45); Beloit, Kansas, U.S.
- Education: Northern Arizona University

Playing career
- 2001–2002: Seward County Community College
- 2003: Arizona State
- 2003: Wilmington Blue Rocks
- 2003: Arizona League Royals
- 2004: Burlington Bees
- 2006–2007: Traverse City Beach Bums
- Position: Pitcher

Coaching career (HC unless noted)
- 2008–2011: Chandler–Gilbert Community College (P)
- 2012–2018: NJIT (asst)
- 2019–present: NJIT

Head coaching record
- Overall: 167–204–2
- Tournaments: NCAA: 1–2

Accomplishments and honors

Championships
- America East Tournament (2021)

Robert Joseph McClellan (born January 31, 1981) is an American college baseball coach and former pitcher. He is the head baseball coach at the New Jersey Institute of Technology. McClellan played college baseball at Seward County Community College from 2001 to 2002 and Arizona State University in 2003 before pursuing a professional career.

== Coaching career ==
On August 28, 2018, McClellan was named the interim head coach of the NJIT Highlanders baseball team. After leading the Highlanders to a 17–27–1 season in 2019, he was named the full-time head coach on June 9, 2019.

== Head coaching record ==
Record table
Season	Team	Overall	Conference	Standing	Postseason
NJIT Highlanders (ASUN Conference) (2019–2020)
2019	NJIT	17–27–1	7–17	9th	
2020	NJIT	6–10	0–0		Season canceled on March 12 due to Coronavirus pandemic
NJIT:			7-17		
NJIT Highlanders (America East Conference) (2021–present)
2021	NJIT	27–24	23–17	2nd (Division B)	NCAA Regional
2022	NJIT	26–27	15–15	T–2nd (Division B)	America East tournament
2023	NJIT	22–31	11–13	T–5th	America East tournament
2024	NJIT	26–28	12–11	3rd	America East tournament
2025	NJIT	27–26	14–10	2nd	America East tournament
2026	NJIT	16–31–1	6–18	7th	
NJIT:		167–204–2	81–84		
Total:		167–204–2			
National champion Postseason invitational champion Conference regular season champion Conference regular season and conference tournament champion Division regular season champion Division regular season and conference tournament champion Conference tournament champion

== See also ==
- List of current NCAA Division I baseball coaches
