= 2022 Ivy League Baseball Championship Series =

2022 Ivy League baseball tournament
- Teams: 2
- Format: Best of three series
- Finals site: Meiklejohn Stadium; Philadelphia
- Champions: Columbia (6th title)
- Winning coach: Brett Boretti (6th title)
- Television: Ivy League DN

2022 Ivy League baseball standings
	Conf.				Overall
Team	W		L	PCT	W		L	PCT
Penn ‍†‍‍	17	–	4	.810	33	–	15	.688
Columbia ‍‍‡‍^{y}	15	–	4	.789	30	–	16	.652
Dartmouth ‍‍‍	14	–	7	.667	24	–	19	.558
Yale ‍‍‍	10	–	11	.476	20	–	18	.526
Harvard ‍‍‍	10	–	11	.476	19	–	22	.463
Brown ‍‍‍	8	–	13	.381	13	–	23	.361
Cornell ‍‍‍	5	–	14	.263	11	–	25	.306
Princeton ‍‍‍	3	–	18	.143	7	–	33	.175
† – Conference champion ‡ – Championship Series champion y – Invited to the NCAA tournament Rankings from D1Baseball

The 2022 Ivy League Baseball Championship Series was a postseason baseball tournament for the Ivy League in the 2022 NCAA Division I baseball season. The tournament took place from May 21–22, 2022 and was held at Meiklejohn Stadium in Philadelphia. This was the first Baseball Championship Series since 2019, as the Ivy League had cancelled spring sports in 2020 and 2021 due to the COVID-19 pandemic. The 28th edition of the Series, it matched the top two teams from the Ivy League's round robin regular season, Penn and Columbia. Columbia won in three games to claim the Ivy League's automatic berth in the 2022 NCAA Division I baseball tournament. This was the final Ivy League postseason tournament under the original two-team format, as the following year instituted a four-team tournament to determine the champion of the Ivy League.

== Results ==
28th Ivy League Championship Series
(2) Columbia Lions	vs.	(1) Penn Quakers

=== Game 1 ===
May 21, 2022 1:02 p.m. (EDT) at Meiklejohn Stadium in Philadelphia, Pennsylvania
Team	1	2	3	4	5	6	7	8	9	R	H	E
Columbia	0	0	0	0	3	1	0	0	0	3	8	1
Penn	1	1	4	4	1	0	2	0	X	13	13	2
WP: Seth DeVries (2–0) LP: JD Ogden (2–3); Home runs: Columbia: None; Penn: Wyatt Henseler; Attendance: 737; Boxscore

=== Game 2 ===
May 22, 2022 12:00 p.m. (EDT) at Meiklejohn Stadium in Philadelphia, Pennsylvania
Team	1	2	3	4	5	6	7	8	9	R	H	E
Penn	0	0	0	0	1	1	0	0	0	2	9	2
Columbia	0	0	0	3	1	0	0	0	X	4	6	1
WP: Sean Higgins (5–3) LP: Joe Miller (6–4) Sv: Griffin Palfrey (1); Attendance: 831; Boxscore

=== Game 3 ===
May 22, 2022 3:23 p.m. (EDT) at Meiklejohn Stadium in Philadelphia, Pennsylvania
Team	1	2	3	4	5	6	7	8	9	R	H	E
Columbia	0	2	0	1	1	0	2	0	3	9	12	0
Penn	0	0	0	0	0	1	0	0	0	1	5	1
WP: Andy Leon (4–0) LP: Cole Zaffiro (2–1) Sv: Billy Black (2); Attendance: 831; Notes: Columbia wins Ivy League; Boxscore
