= Frank Catalanotto =

American baseball player (born 1974)

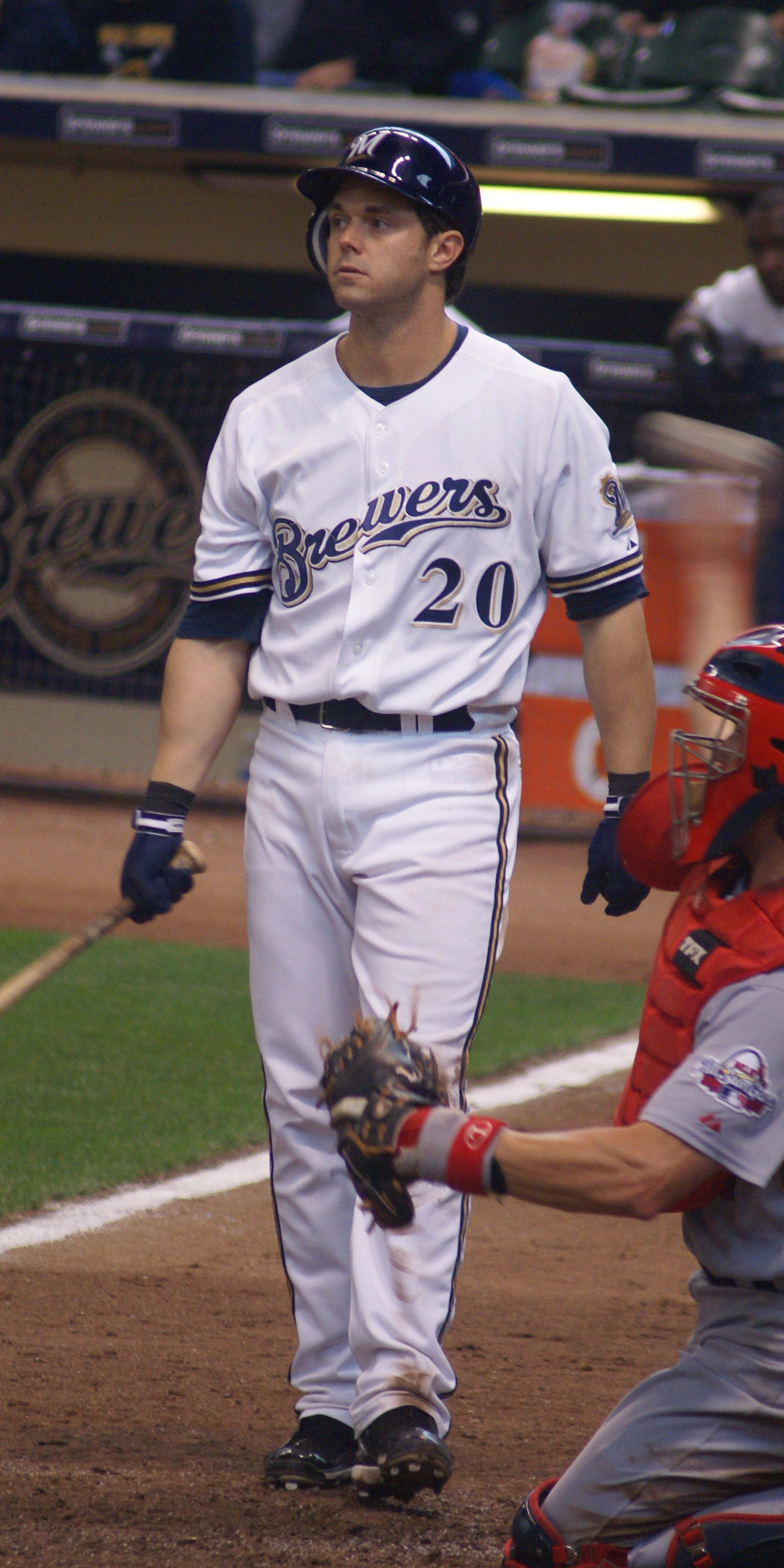
- Catalanotto with the Milwaukee Brewers

Hofstra Pride
- Left fielder / Infielder
- Born: April 27, 1974 (age 52); Smithtown, New York, U.S.
- Batted: Left Threw: Right

MLB debut
- September 3, 1997, for the Detroit Tigers

Last MLB appearance
- May 10, 2010, for the New York Mets

MLB statistics
- Batting average: .291
- Home runs: 84
- Runs batted in: 457
- Stats at Baseball Reference

Teams
- Detroit Tigers (1997–1999); Texas Rangers (2000–2002); Toronto Blue Jays (2003–2006); Texas Rangers (2007–2008); Milwaukee Brewers (2009); New York Mets (2010)

Frank John Catalanotto (born April 27, 1974) is an American baseball coach and former infielder and left fielder, who is the current head baseball coach of the Hofstra Pride. Catalanotto played professional baseball for the Detroit Tigers (1997–1999), the Texas Rangers (2000–2002, 2007–2008), the Toronto Blue Jays (2003–2006), the Milwaukee Brewers (2009) and the New York Mets (2010). In his career, Catalanotto played all infield and outfield positions except shortstop and center field. He then went on to be the head baseball coach of the NYIT Bears (2019–2020) and Hofstra Pride (2022–present), leading the latter program to its first-ever NCAA tournament appearance in 2022.

== Professional career ==
=== Detroit Tigers (1997–1999) ===
Catalanotto began his professional baseball career in 1992 when the Detroit Tigers—who first noticed him while scouting higher-profile players at a Smithtown East baseball game in 1991—drafted him in the tenth round of the 1992 Major League Baseball draft. Primarily a second baseman in the minors, he made his major league debut at second base on September 3, 1997. While in Detroit, Catalanotto battled injuries and a lack of playing time, and never recorded a season of 300 at bats for the Tigers. Detroit general manager Randy Smith chose not to protect Catalanotto in the 1996 Rule 5 draft, and he was selected by the Oakland Athletics, spending spring training with them. Catalanotto did not make the Athletics squad and was returned to the Tigers for the 1997 season.

As a reserve, Catalanotto logged significant time not only at second base, but at first base and third base as well. Over his three-year span in Detroit, he was the most often used pinch hitter for the Tigers, leading the American League (AL) in pinch-hit at bats in the 1998 season.

=== Texas Rangers (2000–2002) ===
On November 2, 1999, Catalanotto was part of an eight player trade between the Tigers and the Texas Rangers. In the deal, he was dealt to Texas along with pitchers Francisco Cordero and Justin Thompson, catcher Bill Haselman, outfielder Gabe Kapler and minor league pitcher Al Webb in exchange for slugging outfield star Juan González, catcher Gregg Zaun, and pitcher Danny Patterson.

Catalanotto made a splash to start to his Rangers career, collecting ten hits and three walks in thirteen consecutive plate appearances from April 21 to May 18, 2000. This streak stands as the Rangers franchise record for consecutive appearances reaching base. He also tied the club's record for hits in a single game (five) on May 17.

After another season plagued by injuries in 2000, Catalanotto finally burst onto the scene in 2001 when he finished fifth in the AL in batting average (.330), and recorded a .431 batting average in August. He also logged a number of innings in the outfield, a position he had fielded for only one inning before 2001. Catalanotto battled injuries again in 2002, and the Rangers declined to offer him a contract in the 2003 offseason.

=== Toronto Blue Jays (2003–2006) ===
On May 1, 2004, against the Chicago White Sox, he set the Blue Jays record for hits in a game, going 6 for 6 in the second game of a double-header.

Catalanotto was named AL player of the week after hitting .500 in the last week of the 2005 season helping him finish with an average of .301. He also won the AL player of the week on July 25, 2005.

On June 5, 2005, at Oakland, he collected the 700th hit of his major league career and on September 22 he scored the 400th run of his career against Seattle.

=== Texas Rangers (2007–2008) ===
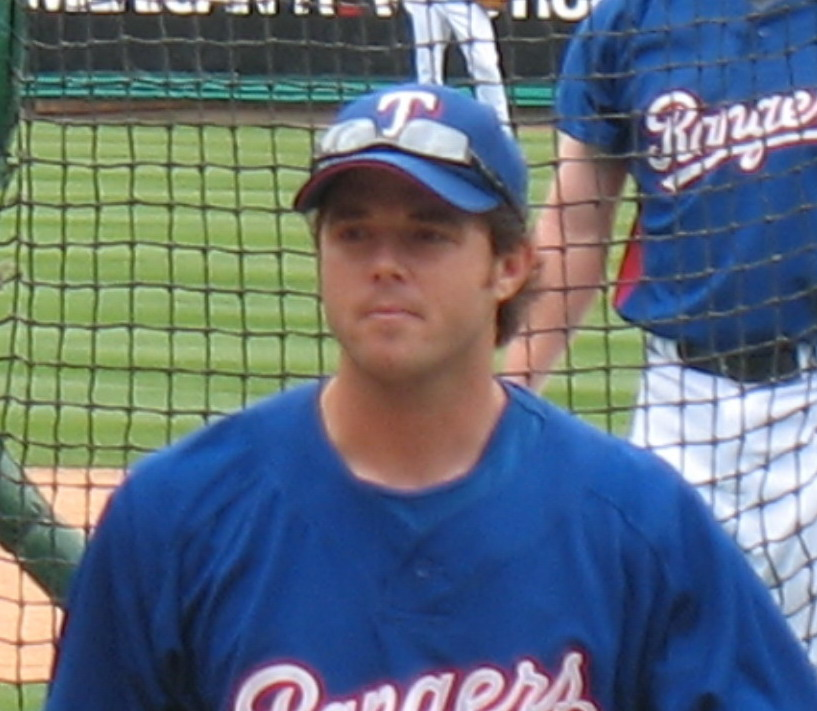
Catalanotto during batting practice at the Rangers home opener on April 8, 2008

On November 19, 2006, the Texas Rangers announced that they had reacquired Catalanotto, signing him to a three-year contract worth $13.5 million.

Catalanotto was released by the Rangers on April 1, 2009.

=== Milwaukee Brewers (2009) ===
On May 12, the Milwaukee Brewers signed Catalanotto to a minor league contract. On May 25, his contract was purchased from the Double-A Huntsville Stars.

Catalanotto wore the number 20 for the first few games in 2009, until switching to the released Brad Nelson's number 27 on June 1.

=== New York Mets (2010) ===
On January 30, 2010, Catalanotto signed a minor league contract with the New York Mets with an invitation to spring training.

On May 10, 2010, the Mets announced that Catalanotto had been designated for assignment, a move that he felt might signal "the end of [his MLB] career". Chris Carter was brought up from the Buffalo Bisons to fill Catalanotto's roster spot.

Catalanotto retired on March 6, 2011.

== Coaching career ==
Catalanotto was hired on June 7, 2018, as the head coach of the New York Institute of Technology college baseball team. In his first season in 2019, he led his team to a 32–14 record and a berth in the East Coast Conference tournament. During the summer of 2020, NYIT suspended all of its athletics for two years. On July 7, 2021, Catalanotto was named the head baseball coach of the Hofstra Pride. In his first season as head coach, he led the Pride to its first-ever NCAA tournament appearance after winning the CAA Baseball championship, the first in program history.

== Head coaching record ==
Record table
Season	Team	Overall	Conference	Standing	Postseason
NYIT Bears (East Coast Conference) (2019–2020)
2019	NYIT	37–16	21–7	2nd	NCAA Division II College World Series
2020	NYIT	9–5	0–0		Season canceled due to COVID-19
NYIT:		46–21	21–7		
Hofstra Pride (Colonial Athletic Association) (2022–present)
2022	Hofstra	30–23	15–9	T–2nd	NCAA Regional
2023	Hofstra	26–26	13–15	8th	
2024	Hofstra	24–33	13–14	T–5th	CAA tournament
2025	Hofstra	18–36	8–19	12th	
2026	Hofstra	0–3	0–0		
Hofstra:		98–121	49–57		
Total:		154–142			
National champion Postseason invitational champion Conference regular season champion Conference regular season and conference tournament champion Division regular season champion Division regular season and conference tournament champion Conference tournament champion

== Personal life ==
Catalanotto is an honorary chairman for the Vascular Birthmarks Foundation and participates in Little League Baseball programs. He is the president of the Frank Catalanotto Foundation.

He and his wife, Barbara, have four children: Morgan, Camdyn, Karson and Gracyn. Morgan was born with a vascular birthmark that spread across her face when she was just two weeks old. The Catalanottos have since become honorary chairs for the Vascular Birthmarks Foundation and started the Frank Catalanotto Foundation.

Despite not having Italian citizenship, Catalanotto's Italian heritage made him eligible to play for the Italian national team at the 2006 and 2009 World Baseball Classic.

Catalanotto was inducted into the Suffolk Sports Hall of Fame on Long Island, New York, in the Baseball Category with the Class of 2010.

== See also ==
- List of Major League Baseball single-game hits leaders
