= 2022 Ivy League baseball season =

- League: Ivy League
- Sport: Baseball
- Teams: 8

Regular Season
- Season champions: Penn & Columbia

Championship Series
- Champions: Columbia
- Runners-up: Penn

Seasons
- ← 2021 2023 →

The 2022 Ivy League baseball season was the baseball season for the Ivy League as part of the 2022 NCAA Division I baseball season. Penn and Columbia were regular season co-champions; however, Columbia defeated Penn in the Championship Series to receive the conference's automatic bid to the NCAA tournament.

The 2022 season marks the first season of Ivy League since 2019 since the COVID-19 pandemic in the United States forced the cancellation of the 2020 season and the conference decided to opt out of the 2021 season.

== Regular season ==
=== Standings ===
Pos	Team	Pld	CW	CL	CPCT	GB	W	L	PCT	Qualification
1	Penn (C)	48	17	4	.810	—	33	15	.688	Qualification for the Championship Series
2	Columbia (C)	50	17	4	.810	—	32	18	.640	Qualification for the Championship Series & NCAA tournament
3	Dartmouth	43	14	7	.667	3	24	19	.558	
4	Yale	38	10	11	.476	7	20	18	.526	
5	Harvard	41	10	11	.476	7	19	22	.463	
6	Brown	36	8	13	.381	9	13	23	.361	
7	Cornell	36	5	14	.263	11	11	25	.306	
8	Princeton	40	3	18	.143	14	7	33	.175	

Source: Ivy League
(C) Champion

=== Results ===
Home \ Away	BROW	COL	CORN	DART	HARV	PENN	PRIN	YALE
Brown		0–3	2–1				3–0	
Columbia					3–0	1–2	3–0	3–0
Cornell		0–3		1–2	0–3			2–1
Dartmouth	2–1	2–1					3–0	
Harvard	2–1			1–2		1–2		
Penn	3–0		3–0	2–1				
Princeton			2–1		1–2	0–3		0–3
Yale	2–1			1–2	2–1	1–2		

Source: Ivy League
Legend: Blue = home team win; Red = away team win.

== Championship Series ==
The 2022 Ivy League Baseball Championship Series was held from May 21 and May 22 at Meiklejohn Stadium in Philadelphia. Columbia defeated Penn in three games to win the championship series.

=== Game 1 ===
May 21, 2022 1:00 pm
Team	1	2	3	4	5	6	7	8	9	R	H	E
Columbia	0	0	0	0	3	1	0	0	0	3	8	1
Penn	1	1	4	4	1	0	2	0	X	13	13	2
WP: Seth DeVries (2–0) LP: JD Ogden (2–3); Home runs: Columbia: None; Penn: Wyatt Henseler; Boxscore

=== Game 2 ===
May 22, 2022 12:00 pm
Team	1	2	3	4	5	6	7	8	9	R	H	E
Penn	0	0	0	0	1	1	0	0	0	2	9	2
Columbia	0	0	0	3	1	0	0	0	X	4	6	1
WP: S Higgins (5–3) LP: Joe Miller (6–4) Sv: G Palfrey (1); Boxscore

=== Game 3 ===
May 22, 2022 3:25 pm
Team	1	2	3	4	5	6	7	8	9	R	H	E
Columbia	0	2	0	1	1	0	2	0	3	9	12	0
Penn	0	0	0	0	0	1	0	0	0	1	5	1
WP: A. Leon (4–0) LP: Cole Zaffiro (2–1) Sv: B. Black (2); Boxscore

== NCAA Tournament ==
Columbia was the lone team selected for the NCAA tournament by receiving the automatic bid. Columbia was the No. 3 seed in the Blacksburg Regional. They upset ranked-opponent Gonzaga in their opening game, but ultimately lost to host team Virginia Tech in the regional final.

== See also ==
- 2022 in baseball
