= 2022 Campbell Fighting Camels baseball team =

2022 Campbell Fighting Camels baseball
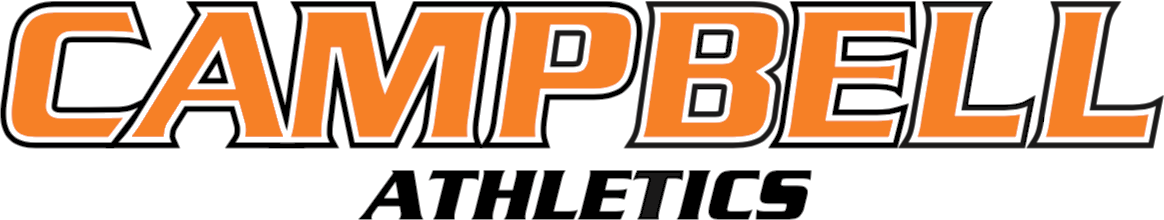

Big South Conference regular season champions Big South tournament champions

NCAA Knoxville Regional, 1–2
- Conference: Big South Conference
- Record: 41–19 (20–3 Big South)
- Head coach: Justin Haire (8th season)
- Assistant coaches: Tyler Robinson (8th season); Joey Holcomb (1st season); Wes Hunt (2nd season)
- Home stadium: Jim Perry Stadium

2022 Big South Conference baseball standings
| | Conf. | | | | | | Overall |
| Team | W | | L | | T | PCT | W | | L | | T | PCT |
|---|---|---|---|---|---|---|---|---|---|---|---|---|
| Campbell ‍†‍‡‍^{y} | 20 | – | 3 | – | 0 | .870 | 36 | – | 16 | – | 0 | .692 |
| USC Upstate ‍‍‍ | 17 | – | 6 | – | 1 | .729 | 34 | – | 20 | – | 1 | .627 |
| UNC Asheville ‍‍‍ | 14 | – | 9 | – | 1 | .604 | 20 | – | 28 | – | 1 | .418 |
| High Point ‍‍‍ | 14 | – | 10 | – | 0 | .583 | 23 | – | 32 | – | 0 | .418 |
| Charleston Southern ‍‍‍ | 13 | – | 11 | – | 0 | .542 | 22 | – | 28 | – | 0 | .440 |
| Gardner–Webb ‍‍‍ | 11 | – | 13 | – | 0 | .458 | 23 | – | 34 | – | 0 | .404 |
| Winthrop ‍‍‍ | 11 | – | 13 | – | 0 | .458 | 18 | – | 34 | – | 0 | .346 |
| Longwood ‍‍‍ | 10 | – | 14 | – | 0 | .417 | 20 | – | 33 | – | 0 | .377 |
| Presbyterian ‍‍‍ | 9 | – | 15 | – | 0 | .375 | 22 | – | 32 | – | 0 | .407 |
| Radford ‍‍‍ | 8 | – | 15 | – | 0 | .348 | 15 | – | 33 | – | 0 | .313 |
| North Carolina A&T ‍‍‍ | 3 | – | 21 | – | 0 | .125 | 15 | – | 38 | – | 0 | .283 |
† – Conference champion ‡ – Tournament champion y – Invited to the NCAA tournament Rankings from D1Baseball

The 2022 Campbell Fighting Camels baseball team represented Campbell University during the 2022 NCAA Division I baseball season. The Camels played their home games at Jim Perry Stadium as a member of the Big South Conference. They were led by head coach Justin Haire, in his eighth season at Campbell.

Campbell won both the regular season and the Big South Tournament.

== Background ==
The 2021 Campbell Fighting Camels baseball team finished the season with a 37–18 record and a 28–9 record in Big South play. The Camels won the Big South regular season championship, but were eliminated by Presbyterian College in the Big South Tournament. Despite this, Campbell earned an at-large berth into the 2021 NCAA Division I baseball tournament as a three seed in the Starkville Regional with one-seed, Mississippi State; two-seed, VCU; and four seed, Samford. Campbell reached the Regional final on a 2–2 record before being eliminated by eventual national champions, Mississippi State.

During the 2021 MLB draft, one player from Campbell was drafted. Spencer Packard was drafted in the ninth round with the 264th overall pick by the Seattle Mariners. Packard was assigned to the club's High-A affiliate, the Everett AquaSox.

== Game log ==
=== Big South tournament ===
Big South tournament teams
| (1) Campbell | (2) USC Upstate | (3) UNC Asheville | (4) High Point | (5) Charleston Southern | (6) Gardner–Webb |

Upper round 1 | Upper round 2 | Upper final | Final
1 | Campbell | 6
4 | High Point | 3 | 5 | Charleston Southern | 7
5 | Charleston Southern | 14 | 5 | Charleston Southern | 11
2 | USC Upstate | 4
2 | USC Upstate | 4
3 | UNC Asheville | 0 | 6 | Gardner–Webb | 2
6 | Gardner–Webb | 4
5 | Charleston Southern | 6 | 2
1 | Campbell | 10 | 3
Lower round 1 | Lower round 2 | Lower round 3 | Lower final
2 | USC Upstate | 8
1 | Campbell | 4 | 1 | Campbell | 11
6 | Gardner–Webb | 9^{10} | 6 | Gardner–Webb | 3
4 | High Point | 3 | 3 | UNC Asheville | 6
3 | UNC Asheville | 6

=== NCAA Regional ===
Campbell was defeated in the NCAA regionals with a record of 1-2.
