= 2022 Northeast Conference baseball tournament =

- Teams: 4
- Format: Double-elimination tournament
- Finals site: Senator Thomas J. Dodd Memorial Stadium; Norwich, Connecticut
- Champions: LIU (2nd title)
- Winning coach: Dan Pirillo (1st title)
- MVP: Nick Torres (LIU)

2022 Northeast Conference baseball standings
	Conf.						Overall
Team	W		L		T	PCT	W		L		T	PCT
LIU ‍†‍‡‍^{y}	18	–	9	–	0	.667	37	–	19	–	0	.661
Bryant ‍‍‍	17	–	10	–	0	.630	30	–	27	–	0	.526
Central Connecticut ‍‍‍	17	–	10	–	0	.630	29	–	18	–	0	.617
Fairleigh Dickinson ‍‍‍	16	–	11	–	0	.593	24	–	30	–	0	.444
Merrimack ‍‍‍	12	–	15	–	0	.444	17	–	31	–	1	.357
Wagner ‍‍‍	12	–	15	–	0	.444	17	–	34	–	0	.333
Sacred Heart ‍‍‍	9	–	18	–	0	.333	12	–	41	–	0	.226
Mount St. Mary's ‍‍‍	7	–	20	–	0	.259	14	–	34	–	0	.292
† – Conference champion ‡ – Tournament champion y – Invited to the NCAA tournament Rankings from D1Baseball

The 2022 Northeast Conference baseball tournament was a postseason baseball tournament for the Northeast Conference in the 2022 NCAA Division I baseball season. The tournament took place from May 26–29, 2022 and was held at Senator Thomas J. Dodd Memorial Stadium in Norwich, Connecticut. LIU defeated Bryant to earn the Northeast Conference's automatic bid to the 2022 NCAA Division I baseball tournament. Long Island won their first championship as the Sharks, as they previously won one as LIU Brooklyn in 2018 prior to the merger between LIU Brooklyn and LIU Post. Bryant departed the NEC after the tournament ended.

== Seeding and format ==
The top four finishers were to be seeded one through four based on conference regular season winning percentage. They will then play a double-elimination tournament.

== Bracket ==
First round
1	LIU	10
4	Fairleigh Dickinson	2
2	Bryant	5
3	Central Connecticut	3
Lower round 1
4	Fairleigh Dickinson	6
3	Central Connecticut	10

Semi-finals
1	LIU	6^{13}
2	Bryant	4
Lower final
3	Central Connecticut	7
2	Bryant	10

Finals
1	LIU	2	7
2	Bryant	7	0
