= 2022 Colonial Athletic Association baseball tournament =

American college baseball tournament

- Teams: 6
- Format: Modified Double-elimination tournament
- Finals site: Walter C. Latham Park; Elon, North Carolina
- Champions: Hofstra (1st title)
- Winning coach: Frank Catalanotto (1st title)
- MVP: Brad Camarda (Hofstra)

2022 Colonial Athletic Association baseball standings
	Conf.						Overall
Team	W		L		T	PCT	W		L		T	PCT
College of Charleston ‍†‍‍	19	–	5	–	0	.792	37	–	20	–	0	.649
UNC Wilmington ‍‍‍	15	–	9	–	0	.625	31	–	24	–	0	.564
Hofstra ‍‍‡‍^{y}	15	–	9	–	0	.625	30	–	21	–	0	.588
William & Mary ‍‍‍	14	–	10	–	0	.583	26	–	23	–	0	.531
James Madison* ‍‍‍	12	–	11	–	0	.522	27	–	26	–	0	.509
Northeastern ‍‍‍	10	–	14	–	0	.417	31	–	29	–	1	.516
Elon ‍‍‍	9	–	14	–	0	.391	27	–	28	–	0	.491
Delaware ‍‍‍	8	–	15	–	0	.348	26	–	26	–	0	.500
Towson ‍‍‍	4	–	19	–	0	.174	14	–	39	–	0	.264
x – Division champion ‡ – Tournament champion y – Invited to the NCAA tournament *Ineligible for the 2022 Tournament due to postseason ban imposed by the CAA. Rankings from D1Baseball

The 2022 Colonial Athletic Association baseball tournament was held at Walter C. Latham Park in Elon, North Carolina, from May 25 through 29. Hofstra won their first ever Colonial Athletic Association baseball championship and earned the conference's automatic bid to the 2022 NCAA Division I baseball tournament.

== Seeding and format ==
Continuing the format adopted in 2012, the top six finishers from the regular season will compete in the modified double-elimination tournament.

== Bracket ==
Upper round 1	Upper round 2	Upper final	Final
1	College of Charleston	5
4	William & Mary	2	5	Northeastern	6
5	Northeastern	3	5	Northeastern	7
3	Hofstra	8^{10}
2	UNC Wilmington	3
3	Hofstra	5	3	Hofstra	4
6	Elon	4
3	Hofstra	7	–
5	Northeastern	6	–
Lower round 1	Lower round 2	Lower round 3	Lower final
1	College of Charleston	3
1	College of Charleston	6	5	Northeastern	6
2	UNC Wilmington	3	6	Elon	1
4	William & Mary	3	6	Elon	13
6	Elon	6

== Schedule ==
Game	Time*	Matchup^{#}	Score	Notes	Reference
Wednesday, May 25
1	11:00am	No. 4 William & Mary vs No. 5 Northeastern	2-3		
2	3:00pm	No. 3 Hofstra vs No. 6 Elon	5-4		
Thursday, May 26
3	11:00am	No. 4 William & Mary vs No. 6 Elon	3-6	William & Mary eliminated	
4	3:00pm	No. 1 College of Charleston vs No. 5 Northeastern	5-6		
5	7:00pm	No. 2 UNC Wilmington vs No. 3 Hofstra	3-4		
Friday, May 27
6	5:15pm	No. 6 Elon vs No. 2 UNC Wilmington	13-3	UNC Wilmington eliminated	
7	9:00pm	No. 6 Elon vs. No. 1 College of Charleston	1-6	Elon eliminated	
Saturday, May 28
8	11:00am	No. 5 Northeastern vs No. 3 Hofstra	7-8 (10)		
9	3:00pm	No. 5 Northeastern vs No. 1 College of Charleston	6-3	College of Charleston eliminated	
Sunday, May 29
10	11:00am	No. 5 Northeastern vs No. 3 Hofstra	6-7	Hofstra wins championship	
11		Rematch (not necessary)	–		
*Game times in EDT. # – Rankings denote tournament seed.
