= 2022 Big South Conference baseball tournament =

- Teams: 6
- Format: Double-elimination
- Finals site: Truist Point; High Point, North Carolina
- Champions: Campbell (6th title)

2022 Big South Conference baseball standings
	Conf.						Overall
Team	W		L		T	PCT	W		L		T	PCT
Campbell ‍†‍‡‍^{y}	20	–	3	–	0	.870	36	–	16	–	0	.692
USC Upstate ‍‍‍	17	–	6	–	1	.729	34	–	20	–	1	.627
UNC Asheville ‍‍‍	14	–	9	–	1	.604	20	–	28	–	1	.418
High Point ‍‍‍	14	–	10	–	0	.583	23	–	32	–	0	.418
Charleston Southern ‍‍‍	13	–	11	–	0	.542	22	–	28	–	0	.440
Gardner–Webb ‍‍‍	11	–	13	–	0	.458	23	–	34	–	0	.404
Winthrop ‍‍‍	11	–	13	–	0	.458	18	–	34	–	0	.346
Longwood ‍‍‍	10	–	14	–	0	.417	20	–	33	–	0	.377
Presbyterian ‍‍‍	9	–	15	–	0	.375	22	–	32	–	0	.407
Radford ‍‍‍	8	–	15	–	0	.348	15	–	33	–	0	.313
North Carolina A&T ‍‍‍	3	–	21	–	0	.125	15	–	38	–	0	.283
† – Conference champion ‡ – Tournament champion y – Invited to the NCAA tournament Rankings from D1Baseball

The 2022 Big South Conference baseball tournament was held from May 25 through 28. The top six regular season finishers of the conference's eleven teams met in the double-elimination tournament held at Truist Point in High Point, North Carolina. The tournament champion earned the conference's automatic bid to the 2022 NCAA Division I baseball tournament.

== Seeding and format ==
The top six finishers of the league's eleven teams qualify for the double-elimination tournament. Teams are seeded based on conference winning percentage, with the first tiebreaker being head-to-head record.

== Results ==
Upper round 1	Upper round 2	Upper final	Final
1	Campbell	6
4	High Point	3	5	Charleston Southern	7
5	Charleston Southern	14	5	Charleston Southern	11
2	USC Upstate	4
2	USC Upstate	4
3	UNC Asheville	0	6	Gardner–Webb	2
6	Gardner–Webb	4
5	Charleston Southern	6	2
1	Campbell	10	3
Lower round 1	Lower round 2	Lower round 3	Lower final
2	USC Upstate	8
1	Campbell	4	1	Campbell	11
6	Gardner–Webb	9^{10}	6	Gardner–Webb	3
4	High Point	3	3	UNC Asheville	6
3	UNC Asheville	6

== Schedule ==
Game	Time*	Matchup^{#}	Score	Television
Wednesday, May 25
1	11:00am	No. 4 High Point vs No. 5 Charleston Southern	3-14	ESPN+
2	3:00pm	No. 3 UNC Asheville vs No. 6 Gardner–Webb	0-4	ESPN+
3	7:00pm	Loser Game 1 No. 4 High Point vs Loser Game 2 No. 3 UNC Asheville Elimination Game	3-6	ESPN+
Thursday, May 26
4	11:00am	No. 1 Campbell vs No. 5 Charleston Southern	6-7	ESPN+
5	3:00pm	No. 2 USC Upstate vs No. 6 Gardner–Webb	4-2	ESPN+
6	7:00pm	Winner Game 3 No. 3 UNC Asheville vs Loser of Game 4/5 (lower seed) No. 6 Gardner–Webb Elimination Game	6-9^{10}	ESPN+
Friday, May 27
7	11:00am	Winner Game 6 No. 6 Gardner–Webb vs Loser of Game 4/5 (higher seed) No. 1 Campbell Elimination Game	3-4	ESPN+
8	3:00pm	Winner Game 4 No. 5 Charleston Southern vs Winner of Game 5 No. 2 USC Upstate	11-4	ESPN+
9	7:00pm	Winner of Game 7 No. 1 Campbell vs Loser of Game 8 No. 2 USC Upstate Elimination Game		ESPN+
Championship – Saturday, May 28
10	12:00pm	Winner of Game 8 No. 5 Charleston Southern vs Winner of Game 9		ESPNU
11	45 min after Game 10	Winner of Game 11 vs Loser of Game 11 If Necessary		ESPN+
*Game times in EDT. # – Rankings denote tournament seed.
