= 2022 America East Conference baseball tournament =

American college baseball tournament

- Teams: 6
- Format: Double-elimination
- Finals site: Mahaney Diamond; Orono, Maine
- Champions: Binghamton (5th title)

2022 America East Conference baseball standings
	Conf.				Overall
Team	W		L	PCT	W		L	PCT
Division A
Maine ^{x}‍‍‍	21	–	9	.700	27	–	22	.551
UMass Lowell ‍‍‍	15	–	15	.500	28	–	30	.483
Hartford ‍‍‍	11	–	19	.367	13	–	37	.260
Albany ‍‍‍	11	–	19	.367	22	–	25	.468
Division B
Stony Brook* ^{x}‍‍‍	21	–	9	.700	27	–	25	.519
Binghamton ‍‍‡‍^{y}	15	–	15	.500	22	–	28	.440
NJIT ‍‍‍	15	–	15	.500	26	–	27	.491
UMBC ‍‍‍	11	–	19	.367	23	–	32	.418
x – Division champion ‡ – Tournament champion y – Invited to the NCAA tournament *Ineligible for the 2022 Tournament due to postseason ban imposed for announcing move to the Colonial for 2022-2023. Rankings from D1Baseball

The 2022 America East Conference baseball tournament was held from May 25 to 28, 2022. The top six teams out of the league's seven eligible members met in the double-elimination tournament held at Mahaney Diamond in Orono, Maine, the home park of Maine. The tournament champion received the conference's automatic bid into the 2022 NCAA Division I baseball tournament.

== Seeding and format ==
The top six teams from the regular season are seeded one through six based on conference winning percentage only. The two division winners receive a first-round bye. The teams then play a double-elimination tournament. Stony Brook is ineligible, as they will depart the America East Conference after the 2022 season.

== Bracket ==
First round Wednesday, May 25	Second round Thursday, May 26	Third round Friday, May 27	Championship; Saturday, May 28
1	Maine	7
4	UMass Lowell	7	4	UMass Lowell	9
5	UMBC	6	4	UMass Lowell	5
2	Binghamton	8
2	Binghamton	20
3	NJIT	3	3	NJIT	5
6	Hartford	2
2	Binghamton	7	–
4	UMass Lowell	1	–
Lower round 1	Lower round 2	Lower round 3	Lower final
4	UMass Lowell	13
1	Maine	7	3	NJIT	8
5	UMBC	1	3	NJIT	9
5	UMBC	4	3	NJIT	2
6	Hartford	3
