= Walter C. Latham Park =

Baseball venue located in Elon, North Carolina, United States

- Latham Park
- Interactive map of Walter C. Latham Park
- Full name: Newsome Field at Walter C. Latham Park
- Location: Bank of America Drive, Elon, NC, United States
- Coordinates: 36.108429°N 79.507499°W
- Owner: Elon University
- Capacity: 2,000
- Surface: FieldTurf (Infield), Natural grass (Outfield)
- Scoreboard: Electronic
- Record attendance: 1,873 (April 28, 2009 vs. East Carolina)
- Field size: 317 ft. (LF), 360 ft. (LCF), 385 (CF), 380 ft. (RCF), 328 ft. (RF)

Construction
- Opened: 2001
- Renovated: 2005, 2010

Tenant
- Elon Phoenix baseball (NCAA DI CAA)

Walter C. Latham Park is a baseball venue located in Elon, North Carolina, United States. It is home to the Elon Phoenix baseball team, a member of the NCAA Division I's Colonial Athletic Association. The venue has a capacity of 2,000 spectators.

The venue is named for Walter C. Latham, an Elon alumnus and North Carolina educator and athletic coach. Newsome Field is the name of the baseball field itself at the facility. The field portion is named for Wilburn E. "Webb" Newsome, a member of the Elon Athletics Hall of Fame who participated in football, baseball, and boxing at the school.

In 2005, lights were installed at the venue, allowing night games to be played for the first time. In the summer of 2010, a donation by Bryan Latham, son of the late Walter C. Latham for whom the field is named, allowed for more renovations. A FieldTurf infield was installed, along with a new outfield drainage system and new fencing.

A Latham Park attendance record was set on April 28, 2009. In front of 1,873 spectators, Elon defeated then-nationally ranked East Carolina 10-8. The venue's first crowd of over 1,000 people was April 29, 2006, with Elon defeating Georgia Southern 7-6.

== See also ==
- List of NCAA Division I baseball venues
