= 2022 NCAA Division I baseball tournament =

American college sports championship

- Season: 2022
- Teams: 64
- Finals site: Charles Schwab Field Omaha; Omaha, Nebraska
- Champions: Ole Miss (1st title)
- Runner-up: Oklahoma (11th CWS Appearance)
- Winning coach: Mike Bianco (1st title)
- MOP: Dylan DeLucia (Ole Miss)
- Television: ESPN; ESPN2; ESPNU; ACCN; SECN; LHN; ESPN+

The 2022 NCAA Division I baseball tournament was the 75th edition of the NCAA Division I Baseball Championship. The 64-team tournament began on Friday, June 3 as part of the 2022 NCAA Division I baseball season and concluded with the 2022 College World Series in Omaha, Nebraska, which started on June 17 and ended on June 27. Ole Miss swept Oklahoma to win their first national championship in program history.

The 64 participating NCAA Division I college baseball teams were selected out of an eligible 300 teams. 31 teams were awarded an automatic bid as champions of their conferences, and 33 teams were selected at-large by the NCAA Division I Baseball Committee. Teams were then divided into sixteen regionals of four teams, each of which conducted a double-elimination tournament. Regional champions then faced each other in Super Regionals, a best-of-three-game series, to determine the eight participants in the College World Series.

Coppin State and Hofstra made their tournament debuts, while Air Force received their first bid since 1969. Mississippi State was the first defending champion to miss qualification to the tournament since Coastal Carolina in 2017. NC State joined Mississippi State as a 2021 College World Series participant that failed to qualify.

== Tournament procedure ==
A total of 64 teams entered the tournament, with 31 of them receiving an automatic bid by either winning their conference's tournament or by finishing in first place in their conference. The remaining 33 bids were at-large, with selections extended by the NCAA Selection Committee. For the first time ever, the Pac-12 Conference had a conference tournament to determine who will get the automatic bid.

== National seeds ==
The sixteen national seeds were announced on the Selection Show on Monday, May 30 at 12 p.m. EDT on ESPN2. Teams in italics advanced to the Super Regionals. Teams in bold advanced to the 2022 College World Series.

1. Tennessee
2. **Stanford**
3. Oregon State
4. Virginia Tech
5. **Texas A&M**
6. Miami (FL)
7. Oklahoma State
8. East Carolina
9. **Texas**
10. North Carolina
11. Southern Miss
12. Louisville
13. Florida
14. **Auburn**
15. Maryland
16. Georgia Southern

== Schedule and venues ==
On May 29, the NCAA Division I Baseball Committee announced the sixteen regional host sites.

Regionals

- June 3–6
  - Plainsman Park, Auburn, Alabama (Host: Auburn University)
  - UFCU Disch–Falk Field, Austin, Texas, (Host: University of Texas at Austin)
  - English Field, Blacksburg, Virginia, (Host: Virginia Polytechnic Institute and State University)
  - Boshamer Stadium, Chapel Hill, North Carolina, (Host: University of North Carolina at Chapel Hill)
  - Bob "Turtle" Smith Stadium, College Park, Maryland (Host: University of Maryland, College Park)
  - Olsen Field at Blue Bell Park, College Station, Texas, (Host: Texas A&M University)
  - Alex Rodriguez Park at Mark Light Field, Coral Gables, Florida, (Host: University of Miami)
  - Goss Stadium at Coleman Field, Corvallis, Oregon (Host: Oregon State University)
  - Condron Ballpark, Gainesville, Florida, (Host: University of Florida)
  - Clark–LeClair Stadium, Greenville, North Carolina, (Host: East Carolina University)
  - Pete Taylor Park, Hattiesburg, Mississippi, (Host: University of Southern Mississippi)
  - Lindsey Nelson Stadium, Knoxville, Tennessee, (Host: University of Tennessee)
  - Jim Patterson Stadium, Louisville, Kentucky, (Host: University of Louisville)
  - Klein Field at Sunken Diamond, Stanford, California (Host: Stanford University)
  - J. I. Clements Stadium, Statesboro, Georgia, (Host: Georgia Southern University)
  - O'Brate Stadium, Stillwater, Oklahoma (Host: Oklahoma State University–Stillwater)

Super Regionals

- June 10–12
  - English Field, Blacksburg, Virginia, (Host: Virginia Polytechnic Institute and State University)
  - Olsen Field at Blue Bell Park, College Station, Texas, (Host: Texas A&M University)
  - Clark–LeClair Stadium, Greenville, North Carolina, (Host: East Carolina University)
  - Lindsey Nelson Stadium, Knoxville, Tennessee, (Host: University of Tennessee)
- June 11–13
  - Boshamer Stadium, Chapel Hill, North Carolina, (Host: University of North Carolina at Chapel Hill)
  - Goss Stadium at Coleman Field, Corvallis, Oregon (Host: Oregon State University)
  - Pete Taylor Park, Hattiesburg, Mississippi, (Host: University of Southern Mississippi)
  - Klein Field at Sunken Diamond, Stanford, California (Host: Stanford University)

College World Series

- June 16–27
  - Charles Schwab Field Omaha, Omaha, Nebraska, (Host: Creighton University)

== Bids ==
=== Automatic bids ===
School	Conference	Record (Conf)	Berth	Last NCAA Appearance
Binghamton	America East	22–28 (15–15)	Tournament	2016 (College Station Regional)
East Carolina	American	42–18 (20–4)	Tournament	2021 (Nashville Super Regional)
Kennesaw State	ASUN	35–26 (19–11)	Tournament	2014 (Louisville Super Regional)
North Carolina	ACC	38–19 (15–15)	Tournament	2021 (Lubbock Regional)
VCU	Atlantic 10	40–18 (19–5)	Tournament	2021 (Starkville Regional)
Oklahoma	Big 12	37–20 (15–9)	Tournament	2018 (Tallahassee Super Regional)
UConn	Big East	46–13 (16–5)	Tournament	2021 (South Bend Regional)
Campbell	Big South	40–17 (20–3)	Tournament	2021 (Starkville Regional)
Michigan	Big Ten	32–26 (12–12)	Tournament	2021 (South Bend Regional)
UC Santa Barbara	Big West	43–12 (27–3)	Regular season	2021 (Tucson Regional)
Hofstra	Colonial	30–21 (15–9)	Tournament	First Appearance
Louisiana Tech	Conference USA	42–19 (20–10)	Tournament	2021 (Ruston Regional)
Wright State	Horizon	30–29 (14–10)	Tournament	2021 (Knoxville Regional)
Columbia	Ivy League	29–16 (17–4)	Championship series	2018 (Gainesville Regional)
Canisius	Metro Atlantic	29–23 (15–9)	Tournament	2018 (Minneapolis Regional)
Central Michigan	Mid-American	42–17 (30–7)	Tournament	2021 (South Bend Regional)
Coppin State	Mid-Eastern	24–28 (17–13)	Tournament	First Appearance
Missouri State	Missouri Valley	30–27 (8–13)	Tournament	2018 (Oxford Regional)
Air Force	Mountain West	30–27 (15–15)	Tournament	1969 (District 7 Regional)
LIU	Northeast	37–19 (18–9)	Tournament	2018 (Conway Regional)
Southeast Missouri State	Ohio Valley	37–20 (16–8)	Tournament	2021 (Oxford Regional)
Stanford	Pac-12	41–14 (21–9)	Tournament	2021 College World Series
Army	Patriot	29–21 (18–7)	Tournament	2021 (Lubbock Regional)
Tennessee	SEC	53–7 (25–5)	Tournament	2021 College World Series
UNC Greensboro	Southern	34–28 (12–9)	Tournament	2017 (Clemson Regional)
Southeastern Louisiana	Southland	30–29 (14–10)	Tournament	2017 (Baton Rouge Regional)
Alabama State	Southwestern Athletic	34–23 (21–8)	Tournament	2016 (Tallahassee Regional)
Oral Roberts	Summit	38–18 (14–7)	Tournament	2018 (Fayetteville Regional)
Louisiana	Sun Belt	36–21 (19–11)	Tournament	2016 (Lafayette Regional)
San Diego	West Coast	36–18 (17–10)	Tournament	2013 (Los Angeles Regional)
New Mexico State	Western Athletic	24–32 (10–20)	Tournament	2018 (Lubbock Regional)

=== By conference ===
Conference	Total	Schools
ACC	9	Florida State, Georgia Tech, Louisville, Miami, North Carolina, Notre Dame, Virginia, Virginia Tech, Wake Forest
SEC	9	Arkansas, Auburn, Florida, Georgia, LSU, Ole Miss, Tennessee, Texas A&M, Vanderbilt
Big 12	5	Oklahoma, Oklahoma State, TCU, Texas, Texas Tech
Pac-12	5	Arizona, Oregon, Oregon State, Stanford, UCLA
Sun Belt	4	Coastal Carolina, Georgia Southern, Louisiana, Texas State
ASUN	2	Kennesaw State, Liberty
Big Ten	2	Maryland, Michigan
Conference USA	2	Louisiana Tech, Southern Miss
Missouri Valley	2	Dallas Baptist, Missouri State
West Coast	2	Gonzaga, San Diego
Western Athletic	2	Grand Canyon, New Mexico State
America East	1	Binghamton
American	1	East Carolina
Atlantic 10	1	VCU
Big East	1	UConn
Big South	1	Campbell
Big West	1	UC Santa Barbara
Colonial	1	Hofstra
Horizon	1	Wright State
Ivy League	1	Columbia
Metro Atlantic	1	Canisius
Mid-American	1	Central Michigan
Mid-Eastern	1	Coppin State
Mountain West	1	Air Force
Northeast	1	LIU
Ohio Valley	1	Southeast Missouri State
Patriot	1	Army
Southern	1	UNC Greensboro
Southland	1	Southeastern Louisiana
Southwestern Athletic	1	Alabama State
Summit	1	Oral Roberts

== Regionals and Super Regionals ==
Bold indicates winner. Seeds for regional tournaments indicate seeds within regional. Seeds for super regional tournaments indicate national seeds only.

=== Knoxville Super Regional ===
Regional	Regional
1	**Tennessee**	**10**
4	Alabama State	0
1	**Tennessee**	**12**
3	Campbell	7
3	**Campbell**	**15**
2	Georgia Tech	8
Knoxville Regional – Lindsey Nelson Stadium
4	Alabama State	4
2	**Georgia Tech**	**13**
2	**Georgia Tech**	**16**
3	Campbell	5
1	**Georgia Southern**	**8**
4	UNC Greensboro	0
1	Georgia Southern	4
2	**Notre Dame**	**6**
3	Texas Tech	2
2	**Notre Dame**	**3**
Statesboro Regional – J. I. Clements Stadium
4	UNC Greensboro	0
3	**Texas Tech**	**2**
3	**Texas Tech**	**3**
1	Georgia Southern	1

Regional Final
1	**Tennessee**	**9**	–
2	Georgia Tech	6	–
2	**Notre Dame**	**2**	–
3	Texas Tech	1	–

Super Regional
1	Tennessee	6	**12**	3
**Notre Dame**	**8**	4	**7**

=== Greenville Super Regional ===
Regional	Regional
1	**East Carolina**	**17**
4	Coppin State	1
1	**East Carolina**	**4**
2	Virginia	2
3	Coastal Carolina	2
2	**Virginia**	**7**
Greenville Regional – Clark–LeClair Stadium
4	Coppin State	8
3	**Coastal Carolina**	**10**
3	**Coastal Carolina**	**7**
2	Virginia	6
1	**Texas**	**11**
4	Air Force	3
1	**Texas**	**5**
2	Louisiana Tech	2
3	Dallas Baptist	5
2	**Louisiana Tech**	**12**
Austin Regional – UFCU Disch–Falk Field
4	**Air Force**	**5**
3	Dallas Baptist	1
4	**Air Force**	**9**
2	Louisiana Tech	7

Regional Final
1	**East Carolina**	1	**13**
3	Coastal Carolina	**9**	4
1	**Texas**	**10**	–
4	Air Force	1	–

Super Regional
8	East Carolina	**13**	8	1
9	**Texas**	7	**9**	**11**

=== College Station Super Regional ===
Regional	Regional
1	**Texas A&M**	**8**
4	Oral Roberts	2
1	**Texas A&M**	**9**
3	Louisiana	6
3	**Louisiana**	**7**
2	TCU	6
College Station Regional – Olsen Field at Blue Bell Park
4	Oral Roberts	1
2	**TCU**	**3**
2	**TCU**	**6**
3	Louisiana	1
1	**Louisville**	**7**
4	Southeast Missouri State	2
1	Louisville	3
3	**Michigan**	**7**
3	**Michigan**	**8**
2	Oregon	6
Louisville Regional – Jim Patterson Stadium
4	Southeast Missouri State	6
2	**Oregon**	**18**
2	Oregon	5
1	**Louisville**	**8**

Regional Final
1	**Texas A&M**	**15**	–
2	TCU	9	–
3	Michigan	1	9
1	**Louisville**	**20**	**11**

Super Regional
5	**Texas A&M**	**5**	**4**	–
12	Louisville	4	3	–

=== Blacksburg Super Regional ===
Regional	Regional
1	**Virginia Tech**	**15**
4	Wright State	9
1	**Virginia Tech**	**24**
3	Columbia	4
3	**Columbia**	**8**
2	Gonzaga	2
Blacksburg Regional – English Field
4	Wright State	9
2	**Gonzaga**	**11**
2	Gonzaga	6
3	**Columbia**	**15**
1	**Florida**	**7**
4	Central Michigan	3
1	Florida	4
2	**Oklahoma**	**9**
3	Liberty	3
2	**Oklahoma**	**16**
Gainesville Regional – Condron Ballpark
4	**Central Michigan**	**3**
3	Liberty	2^{12}
4	Central Michigan	5
1	**Florida**	**6**

Regional Final
1	**Virginia Tech**	**7**	–
3	Columbia	2	–
2	**Oklahoma**	2	**5**
1	Florida	**7**	4

Super Regional
4	Virginia Tech	4	**14**	2
**Oklahoma**	**5**	8	**11**

=== Corvallis Super Regional ===
Regional	Regional
1	**Oregon State**	**5**
4	New Mexico State	4^{10}
1	**Oregon State**	**12**
3	San Diego	3
3	**San Diego**	**3**
2	Vanderbilt	2
Corvallis Regional – Goss Stadium at Coleman Field
4	New Mexico State	1
2	**Vanderbilt**	**21**
2	**Vanderbilt**	**14**
3	San Diego	4
1	**Auburn**	**19**
4	Southeastern Louisiana	7
1	**Auburn**	**21**
3	Florida State	7
3	**Florida State**	**5**
2	UCLA	3
Auburn Regional – Plainsman Park
4	Southeastern Louisiana	2
2	**UCLA**	**16**
2	**UCLA**	**2**
3	Florida State	1

Regional Final
1	**Oregon State**	1	**7**
2	Vanderbilt	**8**	6
1	**Auburn**	**11**	–
2	UCLA	4	–

Super Regional
3	Oregon State	5	**4**	3
14	**Auburn**	**7**	3	**4**

=== Hattiesburg Super Regional ===
Regional	Regional
1	**Miami (FL)**	**11**
4	Canisius	6
1	Miami (FL)	1
3	**Ole Miss**	**2**
3	**Ole Miss**	**7**
2	Arizona	4
Coral Gables Regional – Alex Rodriguez Park at Mark Light Field
4	Canisius	5
2	**Arizona**	**7**
2	**Arizona**	**4**
1	Miami (FL)	3
1	**Southern Miss**	**2**
4	Army	0
1	Southern Miss	6^{10}
2	**LSU**	**7**
3	Kennesaw State	11
2	**LSU**	**14**
Hattiesburg Regional – Pete Taylor Park
4	Army	8
3	**Kennesaw State**	**9**
3	Kennesaw State	3^{10}
1	**Southern Miss**	**4**

Regional Final
3	**Ole Miss**	**22**	–
2	Arizona	6	–
2	LSU	4	7
1	**Southern Miss**	**8**	**8**

Super Regional
**Ole Miss**	**10**	**5**	–
11	Southern Miss	0	0	–

=== Chapel Hill Super Regional ===
Regional	Regional
1	**Oklahoma State**	**10**
4	Missouri State	5
1	Oklahoma State	12
2	**Arkansas**	**20**
3	Grand Canyon	1
2	**Arkansas**	**7**
Stillwater Regional – O'Brate Stadium
4	**Missouri State**	**8**
3	Grand Canyon	7
4	Missouri State	15
1	**Oklahoma State**	**29**
1	**North Carolina**	**15**
4	Hofstra	4
1	North Carolina	3
3	**VCU**	**4**
3	**VCU**	**8**
2	Georgia	1
Chapel Hill Regional – Boshamer Stadium
4	Hofstra	1
2	**Georgia**	**24**
2	Georgia	5
1	**North Carolina**	**6**

Regional Final
2	**Arkansas**	10^{10}	**7**
1	Oklahoma State	**14**	3
3	VCU	8	3
1	**North Carolina**	**19**	**7**

Super Regional
**Arkansas**	**4**	**4**	–
10	North Carolina	1	3	–

=== Stanford Super Regional ===
Regional	Regional
1	**Stanford**	**20**
4	Binghamton	7
1	Stanford	2
2	**Texas State**	**5**
3	UC Santa Barbara	3
2	**Texas State**	**7**
Stanford Regional – Klein Field at Sunken Diamond
4	Binghamton	4
3	**UC Santa Barbara**	**9**
3	UC Santa Barbara	4
1	**Stanford**	**8**
1	**Maryland**	**23**
4	LIU	2
1	Maryland	5
3	**UConn**	**10**
3	**UConn**	**8**
2	Wake Forest	7
College Park Regional – Bob "Turtle" Smith Stadium
4	LIU	4
2	**Wake Forest**	**10**
2	Wake Forest	5
1	**Maryland**	**10**

Regional Final
2	Texas State	4	3
1	**Stanford**	**8**	**4**
3	**UConn**	6^{11}	**11**
1	Maryland	**7**	8

Super Regional
2	**Stanford**	12	**8**	**10**
UConn	**13**	2	5

== College World Series ==
The College World Series was held at Charles Schwab Field in Omaha, Nebraska.

=== Participants ===
School	Conference	Record (Conf)	Head Coach	Super Regional	Previous CWS Appearances	CWS Best Finish	CWS W–L Record
Notre Dame	ACC	40–15 (16–11)	Link Jarrett	Knoxville	2 (last: 2002)	4th (1957)	3–4
Oklahoma	Big 12	42–22 (15–9)	Skip Johnson	Blacksburg	10 (last: 2010)	1st (1951, 1994)	13–14
Texas A&M	SEC	42–18 (19–11)	Jim Schlossnagle	College Station	6 (last: 2017)	5th (1951, 1993)	2–12
Texas	Big 12	47–20 (14–10)	David Pierce	Greenville	37 (last: 2021)	1st (1949, 1950, 1975, 1983, 2002, 2005)	88–63
Stanford	Pac–12	47–16 (21–9)	David Esquer	Stanford	17 (last: 2021)	1st (1987, 1988)	41–31
Arkansas	SEC	43–19 (18–12)	Dave Van Horn	Chapel Hill	10 (last: 2019)	2nd (1979, 2018)	15–20
Ole Miss	SEC	37–22 (14–16)	Mike Bianco	Hattiesburg	5 (last: 2014)	3rd (1956, 2014)	5-10
Auburn	SEC	42–20 (16–13)	Butch Thompson	Corvallis	5 (last: 2019)	4th (1967)	3–10

=== Bracket ===
First round	Second round
**Notre Dame**	**7**
9	Texas	3
Notre Dame	2
**Oklahoma**	**6**
5	Texas A&M	8
**Oklahoma**	**13**
Bracket 1
9	Texas	2
5	**Texas A&M**	**10**
5	**Texas A&M**	**5**
Notre Dame	1
2	Stanford	2
**Arkansas**	**17**
Arkansas	5
**Ole Miss**	**13**
**Ole Miss**	**5**
14	Auburn	1
Bracket 2
2	Stanford	2
14	**Auburn**	**6**
14	Auburn	1
**Arkansas**	**11**

Semifinals
**Oklahoma**	**5**	–
5	Texas A&M	1	–
**Ole Miss**	2	**2**
Arkansas	**3**	0

Finals
Oklahoma	3	2	–
**Ole Miss**	**10**	**4**	–

=== Game results ===
==== Bracket 1 ====
June 17, 2022; 1:00 pm CDT (UTC-5); Game 1	**Oklahoma**	**13–8**	No. 5 Texas A&M	Charles Schwab Field Omaha; Attendance: 23,886; Umpires: HP: Adam Dowdy, 1B: Chris Coskey, 2B: Jake Uhlenhopp, 3B: Mark Wagers
June 17, 2022; 1:00 pm CDT (UTC-5); Game 1	WP: Jake Bennett (10–3)	Boxscore	LP: Nathan Dettmer (5–3)	Charles Schwab Field Omaha; Attendance: 23,886; Umpires: HP: Adam Dowdy, 1B: Chris Coskey, 2B: Jake Uhlenhopp, 3B: Mark Wagers
June 17, 2022; 1:00 pm CDT (UTC-5); Game 1	HR: Jimmy Crooks (8), Jackson Nicklaus (11)	Boxscore	HR: Austin Bost (10), Jordan Thompson (6)	Charles Schwab Field Omaha; Attendance: 23,886; Umpires: HP: Adam Dowdy, 1B: Chris Coskey, 2B: Jake Uhlenhopp, 3B: Mark Wagers

June 17, 2022; 6:00 pm CDT (UTC-5); Game 2	**Notre Dame**	**7–3**	No. 9 Texas	Charles Schwab Field Omaha; Attendance: 25,134; Umpires: HP: Scott Cline, 1B: Grady Smith, 2B: Darren Hyman, 3B: Kevin Sweeney
June 17, 2022; 6:00 pm CDT (UTC-5); Game 2	WP: John Bertrand (10–3); Sv: Jack Findlay (4)	Boxscore	LP: Pete Hansen (11–3)	Charles Schwab Field Omaha; Attendance: 25,134; Umpires: HP: Scott Cline, 1B: Grady Smith, 2B: Darren Hyman, 3B: Kevin Sweeney
June 17, 2022; 6:00 pm CDT (UTC-5); Game 2	HR: Jared Miller (5), Carter Putz (8)	Boxscore		Charles Schwab Field Omaha; Attendance: 25,134; Umpires: HP: Scott Cline, 1B: Grady Smith, 2B: Darren Hyman, 3B: Kevin Sweeney

June 19, 2022; 1:00 pm CDT (UTC-5); Game 5	No. 9 Texas	**2–10**	**No. 5 Texas A&M**	Charles Schwab Field Omaha; Attendance: 24,056; Umpires: HP: Darren Hyman, 1B: Kevin Sweeney, 2B: Scott Cline, 3B: Grady Smith
June 19, 2022; 1:00 pm CDT (UTC-5); Game 5	LP: Lucas Gordon (7–2)	Boxscore	WP: Micah Dallas (7–3)	Charles Schwab Field Omaha; Attendance: 24,056; Umpires: HP: Darren Hyman, 1B: Kevin Sweeney, 2B: Scott Cline, 3B: Grady Smith

June 19, 2022; 6:00 pm CDT (UTC-5); Game 6	**Oklahoma**	**6–2**	Notre Dame	Charles Schwab Field Omaha; Attendance: 24,934; Umpires: HP: Jake Uhlenhopp, 1B: Mark Wagers, 2B: Adam Dowdy, 3B: Chris Coskey
June 19, 2022; 6:00 pm CDT (UTC-5); Game 6	WP: Cade Horton (5–2)	Boxscore	LP: Aidan Tyrell (5–2)	Charles Schwab Field Omaha; Attendance: 24,934; Umpires: HP: Jake Uhlenhopp, 1B: Mark Wagers, 2B: Adam Dowdy, 3B: Chris Coskey
June 19, 2022; 6:00 pm CDT (UTC-5); Game 6		Boxscore	HR: David Lamanna (3)	Charles Schwab Field Omaha; Attendance: 24,934; Umpires: HP: Jake Uhlenhopp, 1B: Mark Wagers, 2B: Adam Dowdy, 3B: Chris Coskey

June 21, 2022; 1:00 pm CDT (UTC-5); Game 9	**No. 5 Texas A&M**	**5–1**	Notre Dame	Charles Schwab Field Omaha; Attendance: 23,618; Umpires: HP: Scott Cline, 1B: Grady Smith, 2B: Jake Uhlenhopp, 3B: Mark Wagers
June 21, 2022; 1:00 pm CDT (UTC-5); Game 9	WP: Nathan Dettmer (6–3)	Boxscore	LP: Liam Simon (2–1)	Charles Schwab Field Omaha; Attendance: 23,618; Umpires: HP: Scott Cline, 1B: Grady Smith, 2B: Jake Uhlenhopp, 3B: Mark Wagers
June 21, 2022; 1:00 pm CDT (UTC-5); Game 9	HR: Trevor Werner (7)	Boxscore	HR: Brooks Coetzee (12)	Charles Schwab Field Omaha; Attendance: 23,618; Umpires: HP: Scott Cline, 1B: Grady Smith, 2B: Jake Uhlenhopp, 3B: Mark Wagers

June 22, 2022; 1:00 pm CDT (UTC-5); Game 11	**Oklahoma**	**5–1**	No. 5 Texas A&M	Charles Schwab Field Omaha; Attendance: 23,827; Umpires: HP: Grady Smith, 1B: Kevin Sweeney, 2B: Adam Dowdy, 3B: Chris Coskey
June 22, 2022; 1:00 pm CDT (UTC-5); Game 11	WP: David Sandlin (10–4)	Boxscore	LP: Ryan Prager (1–4)	Charles Schwab Field Omaha; Attendance: 23,827; Umpires: HP: Grady Smith, 1B: Kevin Sweeney, 2B: Adam Dowdy, 3B: Chris Coskey
June 22, 2022; 1:00 pm CDT (UTC-5); Game 11	HR: Crooks (9)	Boxscore	HR: Rock (19)	Charles Schwab Field Omaha; Attendance: 23,827; Umpires: HP: Grady Smith, 1B: Kevin Sweeney, 2B: Adam Dowdy, 3B: Chris Coskey

==== Bracket 2 ====
June 18, 2022; 1:00 pm CDT (UTC-5); Game 3	**Arkansas**	**17–2**	No. 2 Stanford	Charles Schwab Field Omaha; Attendance: 24,337; Umpires: HP: Chris Coskey, 1B: Jake Uhlenhopp, 2B: Mark Wagers, 3B: Adam Dowdy
June 18, 2022; 1:00 pm CDT (UTC-5); Game 3	WP: Connor Noland (8–5)	Boxscore	LP: Alex Williams (8–4)	Charles Schwab Field Omaha; Attendance: 24,337; Umpires: HP: Chris Coskey, 1B: Jake Uhlenhopp, 2B: Mark Wagers, 3B: Adam Dowdy
June 18, 2022; 1:00 pm CDT (UTC-5); Game 3	HR: Chris Lanzilli (9), Cayden Wallace (16)	Boxscore	HR: Brock Jones (21)	Charles Schwab Field Omaha; Attendance: 24,337; Umpires: HP: Chris Coskey, 1B: Jake Uhlenhopp, 2B: Mark Wagers, 3B: Adam Dowdy

June 18, 2022; 6:00 pm CDT (UTC-5); Game 4	**Ole Miss**	**5–1**	No. 14 Auburn	Charles Schwab Field Omaha; Attendance: 25,217; Umpires: HP: Grady Smith, 1B: Darren Hyman, 2B: Kevin Sweeney, 3B: Scott Cline
June 18, 2022; 6:00 pm CDT (UTC-5); Game 4	WP: Dylan DeLucia (7–2)	Boxscore	LP: Joseph Gonzalez (7–4)	Charles Schwab Field Omaha; Attendance: 25,217; Umpires: HP: Grady Smith, 1B: Darren Hyman, 2B: Kevin Sweeney, 3B: Scott Cline
June 18, 2022; 6:00 pm CDT (UTC-5); Game 4	HR: Kevin Graham (11)	Boxscore		Charles Schwab Field Omaha; Attendance: 25,217; Umpires: HP: Grady Smith, 1B: Darren Hyman, 2B: Kevin Sweeney, 3B: Scott Cline

June 20, 2022; 1:00 pm CDT (UTC-5); Game 7	No. 2 Stanford	**2–6**	**No. 14 Auburn**	Charles Schwab Field Omaha; Attendance: 23,594; Umpires: HP: Kevin Sweeney, 1B: Scott Cline, 2B: Grady Smith, 3B: Darren Hyman
June 20, 2022; 1:00 pm CDT (UTC-5); Game 7	LP: Quinn Mathews (9–2)	Boxscore	WP: Trace Bright (5–4)	Charles Schwab Field Omaha; Attendance: 23,594; Umpires: HP: Kevin Sweeney, 1B: Scott Cline, 2B: Grady Smith, 3B: Darren Hyman

June 20, 2022; 6:00 pm CDT (UTC-5); Game 8	**Ole Miss**	**13–5**	Arkansas	Charles Schwab Field Omaha; Attendance: 25,246; Umpires: HP: Mark Wagers, 1B: Adam Dowdy, 2B: Chris Coskey, 3B: Jake Uhlenhopp
June 20, 2022; 6:00 pm CDT (UTC-5); Game 8	WP: Hunter Elliott (5–3)	Boxscore	LP: Zack Morris (6–1)	Charles Schwab Field Omaha; Attendance: 25,246; Umpires: HP: Mark Wagers, 1B: Adam Dowdy, 2B: Chris Coskey, 3B: Jake Uhlenhopp
June 20, 2022; 6:00 pm CDT (UTC-5); Game 8	HR: Tim Elko (23), Calvin Harris (2)	Boxscore	HR: Peyton Stovall (6)	Charles Schwab Field Omaha; Attendance: 25,246; Umpires: HP: Mark Wagers, 1B: Adam Dowdy, 2B: Chris Coskey, 3B: Jake Uhlenhopp

June 21, 2022; 6:00 pm CDT (UTC-5); Game 10	No. 14 Auburn	**1–11**	**Arkansas**	Charles Schwab Field Omaha; Attendance: 24,636; Umpires: HP: Adam Dowdy, 1B: Chris Coskey, 2B: Darren Hyman, 3B: Kevin Sweeney
June 21, 2022; 6:00 pm CDT (UTC-5); Game 10	LP: Mason Barnett (3–3)	Boxscore	WP: Will McEntire (2–2)	Charles Schwab Field Omaha; Attendance: 24,636; Umpires: HP: Adam Dowdy, 1B: Chris Coskey, 2B: Darren Hyman, 3B: Kevin Sweeney
June 21, 2022; 6:00 pm CDT (UTC-5); Game 10	HR: Bobby Peirce (10)	Boxscore	HR: Chris Lanzilli (10)	Charles Schwab Field Omaha; Attendance: 24,636; Umpires: HP: Adam Dowdy, 1B: Chris Coskey, 2B: Darren Hyman, 3B: Kevin Sweeney

June 22, 2022; 6:00 pm CDT (UTC-5); Game 12	**Arkansas**	**3–2**	Ole Miss	Charles Schwab Field Omaha; Attendance: 25,401; Umpires: HP: Jake Uhlenhopp, 1B: Darren Hyman, 2B: Mark Wagers, 3B: Scott Cline
June 22, 2022; 6:00 pm CDT (UTC-5); Game 12	WP: Hagen Smith (7–2); Sv: Zack Morris (1)	Boxscore	LP: John Gaddis (3–2)	Charles Schwab Field Omaha; Attendance: 25,401; Umpires: HP: Jake Uhlenhopp, 1B: Darren Hyman, 2B: Mark Wagers, 3B: Scott Cline
June 22, 2022; 6:00 pm CDT (UTC-5); Game 12	HR: Chris Lanzilli (11), Brady Slavens (16)	Boxscore	HR: Kemp Alderman (11)	Charles Schwab Field Omaha; Attendance: 25,401; Umpires: HP: Jake Uhlenhopp, 1B: Darren Hyman, 2B: Mark Wagers, 3B: Scott Cline

June 23, 2022; 3:00 pm CDT (UTC-5); Game 13	**Ole Miss**	**2–0**	Arkansas	Charles Schwab Field Omaha; Attendance: 20,434; Umpires: HP: Kevin Sweeney, 1B: Chris Coskey, 2B: Adam Dowdy, 3B: Grady Smith
June 23, 2022; 3:00 pm CDT (UTC-5); Game 13	WP: Dylan DeLucia (8–2)	Boxscore	LP: Connor Noland (8–6)	Charles Schwab Field Omaha; Attendance: 20,434; Umpires: HP: Kevin Sweeney, 1B: Chris Coskey, 2B: Adam Dowdy, 3B: Grady Smith

==== Finals ====
June 25, 2022 6:00 p.m. (CDT) at Charles Schwab Field Omaha in Omaha, Nebraska
Team	1	2	3	4	5	6	7	8	9	R	H	E
**Ole Miss**	2	1	1	0	0	0	0	4	2	**10**	**16**	**1**
Oklahoma	0	0	0	0	0	2	0	1	0	**3**	**5**	**1**
WP: Jack Dougherty LP: Jake Bennett; Home runs: Ole Miss: Tim Elko, Justin Bench, Calvin Harris, TJ McCants; OU: None

June 26, 2022 2:00 p.m. (CDT) at Charles Schwab Field Omaha in Omaha, Nebraska
Team	1	2	3	4	5	6	7	8	9	R	H	E
Oklahoma	0	0	0	0	0	0	2	0	0	**2**	**3**	**0**
**Ole Miss**	0	0	0	0	0	1	0	3	–	**4**	**6**	**0**
WP: John Gaddis LP: Trevin Michael Sv: Brandon Johnson; Home runs: OU: None; Ole Miss: Jacob Gonzalez

=== All-Tournament Team ===
The following players were members of the Men's College World Series All-Tournament Team.

Position	Player	School
P	**Dylan DeLucia (MOP)**	Ole Miss
P	Cade Horton	Oklahoma
C	Michael Turner	Arkansas
1B	Tim Elko	Ole Miss
2B	Jared Miller	Notre Dame
3B	Justin Bench	Ole Miss
SS	Peyton Graham	Oklahoma
OF	Kevin Graham	Ole Miss
OF	Tanner Tredaway	Oklahoma
OF	Calvin Harris	Ole Miss
DH	Kemp Alderman	Ole Miss

== Final standings ==
Seeds listed below indicate national seeds only

Place	School	Record
1st	Ole Miss	10–1
2nd	Oklahoma	8–4
3rd	Arkansas	8–3
3rd	No. 5 Texas A&M	7–2
5th	No. 14 Auburn	6–3
5th	Notre Dame	6–3
7th	No. 2 Stanford	6–4
7th	No. 9 Texas	5–3
9th	No. 8 East Carolina	4–3
9th	No. 12 Louisville	4–3
9th	No. 10 North Carolina	4–3
9th	No. 3 Oregon State	4–3
9th	No. 11 Southern Miss	4–3
9th	No. 1 Tennessee	4–2
9th	UConn	4–3
9th	No. 4 Virginia Tech	4–2
17th	Air Force	2–2
17th	Arizona	2–2
17th	Coastal Carolina	3–2
17th	Columbia	2–2
17th	No. 13 Florida	3–2
17th	Georgia Tech	2–2
17th	LSU	2–2
17th	No. 15 Maryland	3–2
17th	Michigan	2–2
17th	No. 7 Oklahoma State	3–2
17th	TCU	2–2
17th	Texas State	2–2
17th	Texas Tech	2–2
17th	UCLA	2–2
17th	Vanderbilt	3–2
17th	VCU	2–2
33rd	Campbell	1–2
33rd	Central Michigan	1–2
33rd	Florida State	1–2
33rd	Georgia	1–2
33rd	No. 16 Georgia Southern	1–2
33rd	Gonzaga	1–2
33rd	Kennesaw State	1–2
33rd	Louisiana	1–2
33rd	Louisiana Tech	1–2
33rd	No. 6 Miami (FL)	1–2
33rd	Missouri State	1–2
33rd	Oregon	1–2
33rd	San Diego	1–2
33rd	UC Santa Barbara	1–2
33rd	Virginia	1–2
33rd	Wake Forest	1–2
49th	Alabama State	0–2
49th	Army	0–2
49th	Binghamton	0–2
49th	Canisius	0–2
49th	Coppin State	0–2
49th	Dallas Baptist	0–2
49th	Grand Canyon	0–2
49th	Hofstra	0–2
49th	Liberty	0–2
49th	LIU	0–2
49th	New Mexico State	0–2
49th	Oral Roberts	0–2
49th	Southeast Missouri State	0–2
49th	Southeastern Louisiana	0–2
49th	UNC Greensboro	0–2
49th	Wright State	0–2

== Record by conference ==
Conference	# of Bids	Record	Win %	Nc Record	Nc Win %	RF	SR	WS	NS	CS	NC
Southeastern	9	44–19	.698	39–14	.736	8	5	4	3	1	1
Big 12	5	20–13	.606	20–13	.606	5	2	2	1	1	–
Atlantic Coast	9	24–21	.533	24–21	.533	5	4	1	–	–	–
Pac-12	5	15–13	.536	15–13	.536	4	2	1	–	–	–
American	1	4–3	.571	4–3	.571	1	1	–	–	–	–
Big East	1	4–3	.571	4–3	.571	1	1	–	–	–	–
Conference USA	2	5–5	.500	5–5	.500	1	1	–	–	–	–
Big Ten	2	5–4	.556	5–4	.556	2	–	–	–	–	–
Sun Belt	4	7–8	.467	7–8	.467	2	–	–	–	–	–
Atlantic 10	1	2–2	.500	2–2	.500	1	–	–	–	–	–
Ivy League	1	2–2	.500	2–2	.500	1	–	–	–	–	–
Mountain West	1	2–2	.500	2–2	.500	1	–	–	–	–	–
West Coast	2	2–4	.333	2–4	.333	–	–	–	–	–	–
ASUN	2	1–4	.200	1–4	.200	–	–	–	–	–	–
Missouri Valley	2	1–4	.200	1–4	.200	–	–	–	–	–	–
Western Athletic	2	0–4	.000	0–4	.000	–	–	–	–	–	–
Big South	1	1–2	.333	1–2	.333	–	–	–	–	–	–
Big West	1	1–2	.333	1–2	.333	–	–	–	–	–	–
Mid-American	1	1–2	.333	1–2	.333	–	–	–	–	–	–
America East	1	0–2	.000	0–2	.000	–	–	–	–	–	–
Colonial	1	0–2	.000	0–2	.000	–	–	–	–	–	–
Horizon	1	0–2	.000	0–2	.000	–	–	–	–	–	–
Metro Atlantic	1	0–2	.000	0–2	.000	–	–	–	–	–	–
Mid-Eastern	1	0–2	.000	0–2	.000	–	–	–	–	–	–
Northeast	1	0–2	.000	0–2	.000	–	–	–	–	–	–
Ohio Valley	1	0–2	.000	0–2	.000	–	–	–	–	–	–
Patriot	1	0–2	.000	0–2	.000	–	–	–	–	–	–
Southern	1	0–2	.000	0–2	.000	–	–	–	–	–	–
Southland	1	0–2	.000	0–2	.000	–	–	–	–	–	–
Southwestern Athletic	1	0–2	.000	0–2	.000	–	–	–	–	–	–
Summit	1	0–2	.000	0–2	.000	–	–	–	–	–	–

== Media coverage ==
=== Radio ===
NRG Media provided nationwide radio coverage of the Men's College World Series through its Omaha Station KOZN, in association with Westwood One. It also streamed all MCWS games at westwoodonesports.com, Tunein, the Varsity Network, and on SiriusXM.

==== Broadcast assignments ====
- John Bishop, Gary Sharp, and Connor Happer (June 17–19)
- John Bishop, Damon Benning, and Gary Sharp (June 20–23 afternoon)
- Kevin Kugler, John Bishop, and Gary Sharp (June 20–23 evening)
- Kevin Kugler, Scott Graham, and John Bishop (Championship Series)

=== Television ===
ESPN aired every game from the Regionals, Super Regionals, and the College World Series across its networks.

==== Broadcast assignments ====
Regionals

- Tom Hart and Kyle Peterson: Auburn, Alabama
- Mark Neely and Greg Swindell: Austin, Texas
- Dani Wexelman and Lance Cormier: Blacksburg, Virginia
- Eric Rothman and Jay Walker: Chapel Hill, North Carolina
- Jon Meterparel and Danan Hughes: College Park, Maryland
- Dave Neal and Todd Walker: College Station, Texas
- Roy Philpott and Jon Jay: Coral Gables, Florida
- John Schriffen and Kevin Stocker: Corvallis, Oregon
- Steve Lenox and David Dellucci: Gainesville, Florida
- Clay Matvick and Gregg Olson: Greenville, North Carolina
- Sam Ravech and Nick Belmonte: Hattiesburg, Mississippi
- Mike Monaco and Ben McDonald: Knoxville, Tennessee
- Mike Couzens and Roddy Jones: Louisville, Kentucky
- Roxy Bernstein and Xavier Scruggs: Stanford, California
- Mike Morgan and Gaby Sánchez: Statesboro, Georgia
- Lowell Galindo and Troy Eklund: Stillwater, Oklahoma

Super Regionals

- John Schriffen and Lance Cormier: Blacksburg, Virginia
- Mike Morgan and Gaby Sánchez: Chapel Hill, North Carolina
- Mike Monaco and Chris Burke: College Station, Texas
- Roxy Bernstein and Todd Walker: Corvallis, Oregon
- Clay Matvick and Gregg Olson: Greenville, North Carolina
- Dave Neal and Ben McDonald: Hattiesburg, Mississippi
- Tom Hart and Kyle Peterson: Knoxville, Tennessee
- Dave Flemming and Xavier Scruggs: Stanford, California

College World Series

- Karl Ravech, Eduardo Pérez, Ben McDonald, and Dani Wexelman: June 17 & 18 afternoons
- Mike Monaco, Ben McDonald, and Dani Wexelman: June 19 afternoon
- Mike Monaco, Kyle Peterson, Chris Burke, and Kris Budden: June 17–19 evenings
- Mike Monaco, Ben McDonald, Chris Burke, and Dani Wexelman: June 20–23 afternoons
- Karl Ravech, Eduardo Pérez, Kyle Peterson, and Kris Budden: June 20–23 evenings

CWS Championship Series

- Karl Ravech (Games 1) or Mike Monaco (Game 2), Kyle Peterson, Chris Burke, and Kris Budden

== See also ==
- 2022 NCAA Division I softball tournament
- 2022 NCAA Division II baseball tournament
- 2022 NCAA Division III baseball tournament
