= NJIT Highlanders baseball =

American college baseball team

NJIT Highlanders
- 2026 NJIT Highlanders baseball team
- Founded: 1949
- University: New Jersey Institute of Technology
- Athletic director: Lenny Kaplan
- Head coach: Robbie McClellan (8th season)
- Conference: America East
- Location: Newark, New Jersey
- Home stadium: Yogi Berra Stadium (capacity: 5,000)
- Nickname: Highlanders
- Colors: Red and white

NCAA tournament appearances
- 2021

Conference tournament champions
- 2021

Conference regular season champions
- 2021

For information on all New Jersey Institute of Technology sports, see NJIT Highlanders

The NJIT Highlanders baseball team represents the New Jersey Institute of Technology in Newark, New Jersey in NCAA Division I baseball. They are members of the America East Conference. The team competes in the America East Conference within the National Collegiate Athletic Association's Division I. The Highlanders are coached by Robbie McClellan.

== NJIT in the NCAA tournament ==
NJIT has appeared in the NCAA Division I baseball tournament once. They have a record of 1–2.

Year	Region	Opponent	Result
2021	Fayetteville Super Regional	Arkansas; Northeastern; Nebraska	L 8–13; W 3–2; L 4–18

== Major League Baseball ==
NJIT has had 4 Major League Baseball draft selections since the draft began in 1965.

Highlanders in the Major League Baseball Draft
Year	Player	Round	Team
1973	James Schak	22	Giants
2013	Mark Leiter Jr.	22	Phillies
2015	Ed Charlton	22	Cincinnati
2025	Holden deJong	11	Baltimore

== See also ==
- List of NCAA Division I baseball programs
