= Meiklejohn Stadium =

Ballpark in Philadelphia, Pennsylvania

- Interactive map of Meiklejohn Stadium
- Former names: Murphy Field (2000–2006)
- Location: Philadelphia, Pennsylvania 19104
- Coordinates: 39.9437°N 75.1938°W
- Owner: University of Pennsylvania
- Capacity: 856
- Surface: Grass
- Field size: Left field: 330 feet (100 m); Center field: 380 feet (120 m); Right field: 330 feet (100 m)

Construction
- Built: September 1999–March 2000
- Opened: March 23, 2000
- Cost: US$2 million

Tenant
- Pennsylvania Quakers (Ivy League) (2000–present)

Meiklejohn Stadium is a ballpark in Philadelphia, Pennsylvania. It is on the University of Pennsylvania campus and is the home field for the University of Pennsylvania Quakers varsity baseball team. It opened in March 2000.

The field is about half a mile south-southeast of Franklin Field, along the eastern edge of the university's campus, along the Schuylkill River. The ballpark is tucked away near the intersection of Interstate 76 and University Avenue. The CSX railroad tracks run behind home plate and are still in use. I-76 runs parallel to the outfield wall with a highway exit visible from home plate. The right field foul line is kept tight by a large power plant that has two rising cooling tanks and a fence around its perimeter. River Field Drive, which fronts the railroad tracks to the north, is so close that there are only a couple of rows of seats available on the third base side.

== History ==
The field opened in 2000 and was originally called Murphy Field after the athletic fields on which the ballpark was built. The university referred it to as "Penn Stadium at Murphy Field" in Athletic Department publications. These fields were named for Mike Murphy, an early Penn track coach (1896–1901 and 1905–1913) who won eight intercollegiate track championships at Penn.

When it opened, the dimensions were reported to be 289 feet to the left field foul pole, 317 feet to the right field foul pole, and 385 feet to dead center field, and 38 feet from home-plate to the backstop.

The first game was played on March 23, 2000, against St. Joseph's University; Penn beat St. Joe's 13–12. The ballpark was officially dedicated on April 15, 2000; former Penn baseball player Doug Glanville threw out the first pitch.

It was renamed Meiklejohn Stadium in 2006 to honor Penn-donor William Meiklejohn, a 1942 graduate of the Wharton school and his wife, Louise. Their contributions to the University included $10 million in 2005 to help renovate the baseball field including the addition of a new scoreboard. The field was officially renamed on April 1, 2006, prior to a double-header against Brown University.

The ballpark does not have lights, so all games are played during the day.

== Predecessors ==
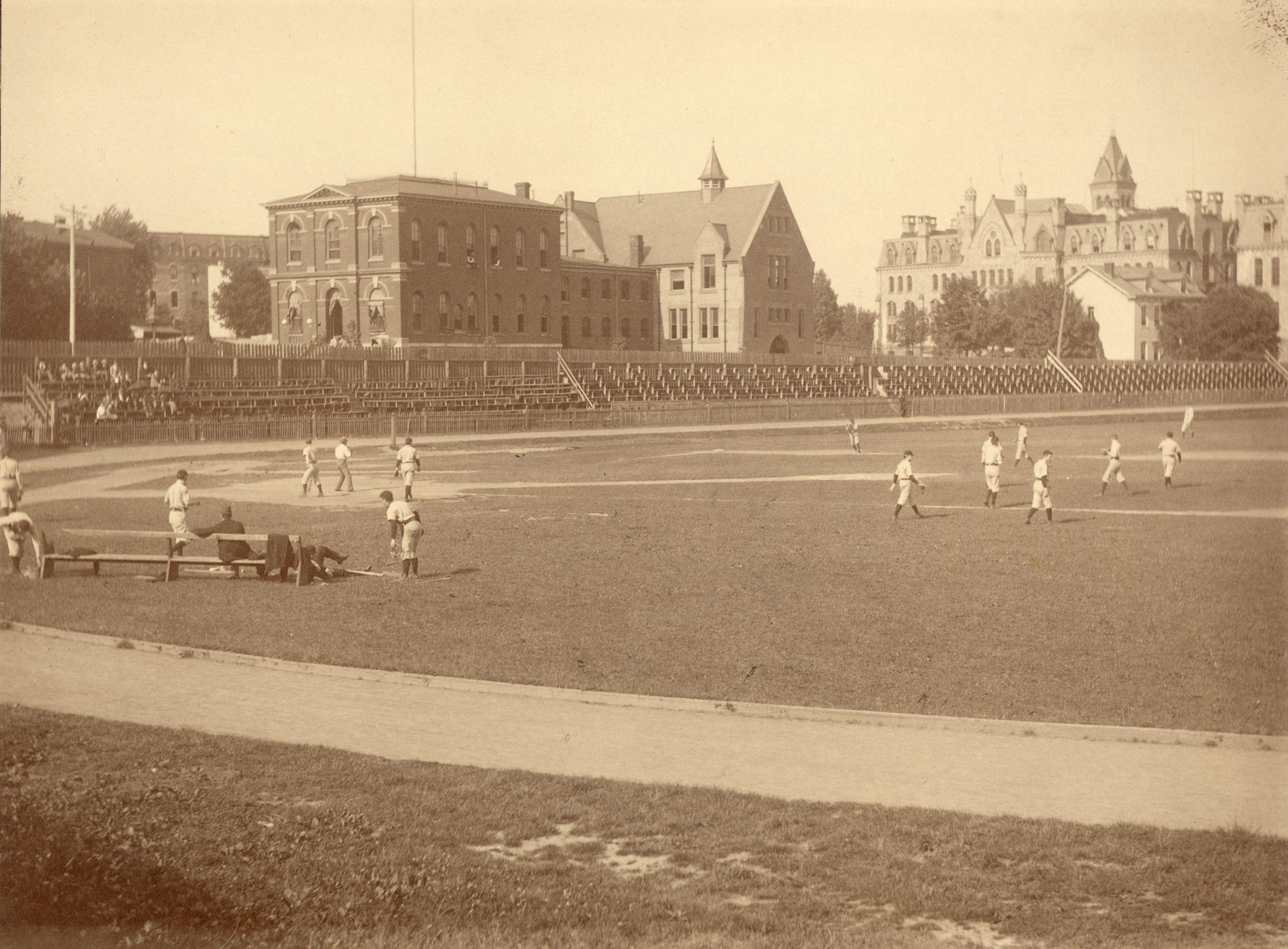
University Grounds in 1891

From at least 1875 through the first few games of 1895, the team staged its home games at Penn's multi-purpose athletic grounds, aka University Athletic Grounds. The field was on the block southeast of the 37th and Spruce intersection, a few blocks west of the eventual site of Franklin Field. That site is now occupied by dormitories and a quadrangle. When a fire destroyed the Philadelphia Phillies' home ballpark in August of 1894, the Phillies played some home games here.

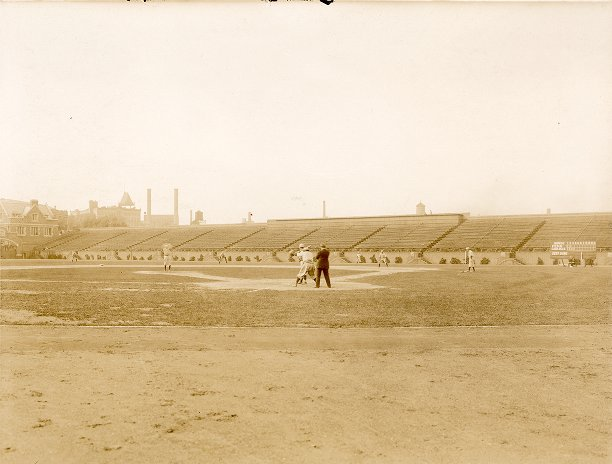
Franklin Field in 1907

Franklin Field served as Penn's home baseball field starting on April 22, 1895. Records show that the Penn varsity baseball team played at Franklin Field from 1895 through 1939. The diamond was tucked into the south corner, with left and center fields spacious and right field very close, possibly less than 250 feet.

River Field, another campus multi-sports facility, opened a baseball diamond in 1940, allowing the baseball team to vacate Franklin Field. Penn played at Murphy Field in 1961.

Bower Field, which opened in May 1979, was Penn baseball's home field immediately prior to Meiklejohn. It was known to be a pitchers' ballpark. Bower was 330 feet down the line in left field, 340 feet down the line to right, 410 feet to dead-center, and had a 25-foot high fence extending from left-center to right-center. The field site, across the railroad tracks east-southeast of Franklin Field, is now occupied by the Hamlin Tennis Center.

== See also ==
- List of NCAA Division I baseball venues
- Schuylkill Arsenal Railroad Bridge
