= Dean Ehehalt =

American baseball player and coach

Current position
- Title: Head coach
- Team: Monmouth
- Conference: CAA
- Record: 801–773–3

Biographical details
- Born: September 10, 1964 (age 62); Middletown Township, New Jersey, U.S.

Playing career
- 1984–1985: Brookdale
- 1986–1987: East Carolina

Coaching career (HC unless noted)
- 1988: East Carolina (Asst.)
- 1989: Princeton (Asst.)
- 1991: Kennesaw State (Asst.)
- 1992–1993: Upsala
- 1994–present: Monmouth

Head coaching record
- Overall: 822–811–3

Accomplishments and honors

Championships
- 4x Northeast Conference Regular Season (1998–99,07,09); MAAC regular season (2018)

Awards
- Northeast Conference Coach of the Year: 1996, 2002, 2005

Dean Ehehalt (born September 10, 1964) is an American college baseball coach, currently serving as head coach of the Monmouth Hawks baseball team. He was named to that position prior to the 1994 season.

Raised in Middletown Township, New Jersey, Ehehalt played baseball at Middletown High School North.

Ehehalt played two seasons at Brookdale Community College before completing his career at East Carolina. He spent one season as a graduate assistant with the Pirates before one season as an assistant at Princeton. He returned for one year to complete a master's at East Carolina in 1990, then spent a season as an assistant at Kennesaw State. In 1992, he earned his first head coaching job and helped engineer a turnaround at Upsala. After two seasons, he became head coach at Monmouth. In his time with the Hawks, he has led the team to eight league regular season titles, 16 twenty-win seasons and 6 thirty-win campaigns.

Together with his wife and daughter, Ehehalt has been a resident of Wall Township, New Jersey.

== Head coaching record ==
Record table
Season	Team	Overall	Conference	Standing	Postseason
Upsala (Middle Atlantic Conference) (1992–1993)
1992	Upsala	5–22	2–8		
1993	Upsala	16–16			
Upsala:		21–38	2–8		
Monmouth (Northeast Conference) (1994–2013)
1994	Monmouth	13–23	7–13	6th	
1995	Monmouth	19–33	8–13	8th	
1996	Monmouth	25–22	15–6	T-1st	NEC Tournament
1997	Monmouth	23–25	11–10	5th	
1998	Monmouth	30–21	10–5	T-1st	NCAA Regional
1999	Monmouth	26–24	12–7	1st (South)	NCAA Regional
2000	Monmouth	25–27	15–7	2nd (South)	NEC Tournament
2001	Monmouth	29–24	17–5	T-1st (South)	NEC Tournament
2002	Monmouth	30–21	23-4	1st	NEC Tournament
2003	Monmouth	24–27	15–11	3rd	NEC Tournament
2004	Monmouth	22–29–1	13–10	3rd	NEC Tournament
2005	Monmouth	30–24	15–8	3rd	NEC Tournament
2006	Monmouth	27–22	14–9	T-4th	
2007	Monmouth	36–24	17–10	3rd	NCAA Regional
2008	Monmouth	37–16	20–5	1st	NEC Tournament
2009	Monmouth	32–25	15–11	T-4th	NCAA Regional
2010	Monmouth	22–27	15–17	5th	
2011	Monmouth	36–19	25–11	1st	NEC Tournament
2012	Monmouth	25–24	21–11	2nd	NEC Tournament (Note: The top four of the NEC's eight eligible teams qualified for the Tournament in 2012. First-place Bryant was not eligible as it transitioned to Division I.)
2013	Monmouth	30–24–1	19–11–1	3rd	NEC Tournament (Note: The top four of the NEC's nine teams qualified for the Tournament in 2013.)
Monmouth:			55–33–1		
Monmouth (Metro Atlantic Athletic Conference) (2014–2022)
2014	Monmouth	24–25	14–12	4th	MAAC tournament
2015	Monmouth	22–24	14–10	5th	MAAC tournament
2016	Monmouth	30–27	16–8	T-2nd	MAAC tournament
2017	Monmouth	20–28	11–13	8th	
2018	Monmouth	30–25	16–7	1st	MAAC tournament
2019	Monmouth	27–29–1	13–11	6th	MAAC tournament
2020	Monmouth	5–9	0–0		Season canceled due to COVID-19
2021	Monmouth	24–13	22–10	2nd	MAAC tournament
2022	Monmouth	24–27	12–10	T-4th	MAAC tournament
Monmouth:			118–81		
Monmouth (Colonial Athletic Association) (2023–present)
2023	Monmouth	16–30	6–22	11th	
2024	Monmouth	18–30	11–16	9th	
2025	Monmouth	24–30	10–17	10th	
Monmouth:		801–773–3	27–55		
Total:		822–811–3			
National champion Postseason invitational champion Conference regular season champion Conference regular season and conference tournament champion Division regular season champion Division regular season and conference tournament champion Conference tournament champion

== See also ==
- List of current NCAA Division I baseball coaches
