= Northeast Conference baseball tournament =

- Conference baseball championship
- Sport: Baseball
- Conference: Northeast Conference
- Number of teams: 4
- Format: Double-elimination
- Current stadium: Heritage Financial Park
- Current location: Wappingers Falls, New York
- Played: 1993–present
- Last contest: 2025
- Current champion: Central Connecticut (9)
- Most championships: Central Connecticut (9)
- Official website: website

Host stadiums
- Heritage Financial Park (2023–present); Senator Thomas J. Dodd Memorial Stadium (2011–12, 2014–2022); First Energy Park (2002–06, 2013); TD Bank Ballpark (2010); New Britain Stadium (2007, 2009); Surf Stadium (2000–01, 2008); The Ballpark at Harbor Yard (1999); Cochrane Stadium (1998)

Host locations
- Wappingers Falls, NY (2023–); Norwich, CT (2011–12, 2014–2022); Lakewood, NJ (2002–06, 2013); Bridgewater, NJ (2010); New Britain, CT (2007, 2009); Atlantic City, NJ (2000–02, 2008); Bridgeport, CT (1999); Jersey City, NJ (1999); Sussex, NJ (1997); Ewing Township, NJ (1993–96)

The Northeast Conference baseball tournament is the conference baseball championship of the NCAA Division I Northeast Conference (NEC). In the current format, the top four regular-season finishers among teams eligible for postseason competition (Note: Under NEC rules established in advance of the 2022–23 academic year, NEC members that are reclassifying from Division II are eligible for NEC postseason tournaments in the third year of the four-year reclassification period, although they remain ineligible for NCAA championships until completing the process.) advance to the double-elimination tournament. The winner of the tournament, if eligible to participate, receives an automatic berth to the NCAA Division I Baseball Championship.

== Champions ==
=== By year ===
The following is a list of conference champions and sites listed by year.

Year	Champion	Runner-up	Venue	MVP
1993	St. Francis	Fairleigh Dickinson	Moody Park • Ewing Township, NJ	John Gambale, St. Francis
1994	Rider	Long Island	Moody Park • Ewing Township, NJ	Mark Gola, Rider
1995	Rider	Long Island	Moody Park • Ewing Township, NJ	Lou Deman, Long Island
1996	Rider	Long Island	Moody Park • Ewing Township, NJ	Jim Gordon, Rider
1997	Marist	Fairleigh Dickinson	Skylands Park • Sussex, NJ	Ben Shove, Marist
1998	Monmouth	St. Francis	Cochrane Stadium • Jersey City, NJ	Joe McCullough, Monmouth
1999	Monmouth	Fairleigh Dickinson	The Ballpark at Harbor Yard • Bridgeport, CT	Mike Benfield, Monmouth
2000	Wagner	Monmouth	The Sandcastle • Atlantic City, NJ	Steve Coppola, Wagner
2001	UMBC	Monmouth	The Sandcastle • Atlantic City, NJ	Eric Weltmer, UMBC
2002	Central Connecticut	UMBC	First Energy Park • Lakewood, NJ	Kevin Rival, Central Connecticut
2003	Central Connecticut	Monmouth	First Energy Park • Lakewood, NJ	Zack Herrick, Central Connecticut
2004	Central Connecticut	Wagner	First Energy Park • Lakewood, NJ	Evan Scribner, Central Connecticut
2005	Quinnipiac	Monmouth	First Energy Park • Lakewood, NJ	Ryan Rizzo, Quinnipiac
2006	Sacred Heart	Central Connecticut	First Energy Park • Lakewood, NJ	Bobby McKee, Sacred Heart
2007	Monmouth	Central Connecticut	New Britain Stadium • New Britain, CT	Matt Coulson, Monmouth
2008	Mount St. Mary's	Monmouth	Bernie Robbins Stadium • Atlantic City, NJ	Josh Vittek, Mount St. Mary’s
2009	Monmouth	Sacred Heart	New Britain Stadium • New Britain, CT	Chris Collazo, Monmouth
2010	Central Connecticut	Sacred Heart	TD Bank Ballpark • Bridgewater, NJ	Pat Epps, Central Connecticut
2011	Sacred Heart	Monmouth	Senator Thomas J. Dodd Memorial Stadium • Norwich, CT	John Murphy, Sacred Heart
2012	Sacred Heart	Monmouth	Senator Thomas J. Dodd Memorial Stadium • Norwhich, CT	Troy Scribner, Sacred Heart
2013	Bryant	Sacred Heart	First Energy Park • Lakewood, NJ	Jordan Mountford, Bryant
2014	Bryant	Sacred Heart	Senator Thomas J. Dodd Memorial Stadium • Norwhich, CT	Craig Schlitter, Bryant
2015	Sacred Heart	Bryant	Senator Thomas J. Dodd Memorial Stadium • Norwhich, CT	Jesus Medina, Sacred Heart
2016	Bryant	Fairleigh Dickinson	Senator Thomas J. Dodd Memorial Stadium • Norwhich, CT	Cole Fabio, Bryant
2017	Central Connecticut	Sacred Heart	Senator Thomas J. Dodd Memorial Stadium • Norwhich, CT	TT Bowens, Central Connecticut
2018	LIU Brooklyn	Wagner	Senator Thomas J. Dodd Memorial Stadium • Norwhich, CT	Gregory Vaughn, LIU Brooklyn
2019	Central Connecticut	Bryant	Senator Thomas J. Dodd Memorial Stadium • Norwhich, CT	Gregory Vaughn, LIU Brooklyn
2020	Canceled due to COVID-19			
2021	Central Connecticut	Bryant	Senator Thomas J. Dodd Memorial Stadium • Norwhich, CT	Buddy Dewaine, Central Connecticut
2022	LIU	Bryant	Senator Thomas J. Dodd Memorial Stadium • Norwhich, CT	Nick Torres, LIU
2023	Central Connecticut	Wagner	Heritage Financial Park • Wappingers Falls, NY	Dominic Niman, Central Connecticut
2024	LIU	Sacred Heart	Heritage Financial Park • Wappingers Falls, NY	Seth Surrett, LIU
2025	Central Connecticut	LIU	Heritage Financial Park • Wappingers Falls, NY	Wyatt Cameron, Central Connecticut
2026	LIU	Fairleigh Dickinson	Heritage Financial Park • Wappingers Falls, NY	Joseph Durso, LIU

=== By school ===
The following is a list of conference champions listed by school. Schools in pink no longer field baseball teams in the NEC.

Program	Championships	Years
Central Connecticut	9	2002, 2003, 2004, 2010, 2017, 2019, 2021, 2023, 2025
Monmouth	4	1998, 1999, 2007, 2009
Sacred Heart	4	2006, 2011, 2012, 2015
Bryant	3	2013, 2014, 2016
Rider	3	1994, 1995, 1996
LIU (Note: This championship was won by LIU Brooklyn. When Long Island University merged the athletic programs of its Brooklyn and Post campuses after the 2019 baseball season, the merged program inherited the history of the Brooklyn program in all sports that were sponsored by that campus before the merger.)	4	2018, 2022, 2024, 2026
Marist	1	1997
Mount St. Mary's	1	2008
Quinnipiac	1	2005
St. Francis Brooklyn	1	1993
UMBC	1	2001
Wagner	1	2000

Among current NEC baseball members:

- Fairleigh Dickinson, Coppin State, Delaware State, Maryland Eastern Shore, Norfolk State, Mercyhurst, Stonehill, and Le Moyne have yet to win a championship. Fairleigh Dickinson is the oldest among the schools to never win it. 2023 saw the first season after the NEC absorbed the MEAC baseball league (Coppin State, Delaware State, Maryland Eastern Shore, Norfolk State) while Stonehill joined the NEC that same year. Le Moyne joined in 2024 and Mercyhurst joined in 2025.

Stonehill first became eligible in 2025 and Le Moyne will be eligible in 2026 while Mercyhurst will be eligible in 2029.
