= 2006 Northeast Conference baseball tournament =

Baseball tournament, New Jersey, U.S.

- Teams: 4
- Format: Double-elimination tournament
- Finals site: FirstEnergy Park; Lakewood, NJ
- Champions: Sacred Heart (1st title)
- Winning coach: Nick Giaquinto (1st title)
- MVP: Bobby McKee (Sacred Heart)

2006 Northeast Conference baseball standings
	Conf.						Overall
Team	W		L		T	PCT	W		L		T	PCT
Central Connecticut ‍†‍‍	16	–	7	–	0	.696	33	–	18	–	0	.647
Quinnipiac ‍‍‍	14	–	8	–	0	.636	22	–	24	–	1	.479
Wagner ‍‍‍	15	–	9	–	0	.625	18	–	34	–	0	.346
Monmouth ‍‍‍	14	–	9	–	0	.609	27	–	22	–	0	.551
Sacred Heart ‍‍‡‍^{y}	14	–	9	–	0	.609	27	–	22	–	0	.551
Mount St. Mary's ‍‍‍	12	–	11	–	0	.522	23	–	24	–	0	.489
Long Island ‍‍‍	10	–	13	–	0	.435	13	–	33	–	1	.287
Fairleigh Dickinson ‍‍‍	6	–	18	–	0	.250	10	–	43	–	0	.189
St. Francis ‍‍‍	3	–	20	–	0	.130	6	–	39	–	0	.133
† – Conference champion ‡ – Tournament champion y – Invited to the NCAA tournament Rankings from Collegiate Baseball

The 2006 Northeast Conference baseball tournament began on May 25 and ended on May 27, 2006, at FirstEnergy Park in Lakewood, New Jersey. The league's top four teams competed in the double elimination tournament. Fourth-seeded Sacred Heart won their first tournament championship and earned the Northeast Conference's automatic bid to the 2006 NCAA Division I baseball tournament.

== Seeding and format ==
The top four finishers were seeded one through four based on conference regular-season winning percentage.

Team	Wins	Losses	Pct.	GB	Seed
Central Connecticut	16	7	.696	—	1
Quinnipiac	14	8	.636	1.5	2
Wagner	15	9	.625	1.5	3
Sacred Heart	14	9	.609	2	4
Monmouth	14	9	.609	2	—
Mount St. Mary's	12	11	.522	4	—
Long Island	10	13	.435	6	—
Fairleigh Dickinson	6	18	.250	10.5	—
St. Francis	3	20	.130	13	—

== Bracket ==
First round
1	Central Connecticut	5
4	Sacred Heart	7
3	Wagner	3
2	Quinnipiac	2
Lower round 1
1	Central Connecticut	7
2	Quinnipiac	6

Semi-finals
4	Sacred Heart	4
3	Wagner	0
Lower final
3	Wagner	8
1	Central Connecticut	25

Finals
4	Sacred Heart	10
1	Central Connecticut	8

== All-Tournament Team ==
The following players were named to the All-Tournament Team.

Name	School
Chris Aldrich	Sacred Heart
Ricky Coppola	Quinnipiac
Jeff Hanson	Sacred Heart
Bobby McKee	Sacred Heart
Jay Monti	Sacred Heart
John Romano	Central Connecticut
Adam Taha	Central Connecticut
Joe Testa	Wagner

=== Most Valuable Player ===
Bobby McKee of Sacred Heart was named Tournament Most Valuable Player.
