= 2007 Northeast Conference baseball tournament =

Baseball tournament, Connecticut, U.S.

- Teams: 4
- Format: Double-elimination tournament
- Finals site: New Britain Stadium; New Britain, CT
- Champions: Monmouth (3rd title)
- Winning coach: Dean Ehehalt (3rd title)
- MVP: Matt Coulson (Monmouth)

2007 Northeast Conference baseball standings
	Conf.						Overall
Team	W		L		T	PCT	W		L		T	PCT
Quinnipiac ‍†‍‍	21	–	7	–	0	.750	29	–	18	–	1	.615
Mount St. Mary's ‍†‍‍	21	–	7	–	0	.750	35	–	22	–	0	.614
Monmouth ‍‍‡‍^{y}	17	–	10	–	0	.630	36	–	24	–	1	.598
Central Connecticut ‍‍‍	14	–	14	–	0	.500	26	–	26	–	0	.500
Sacred Heart ‍‍‍	12	–	15	–	0	.444	22	–	31	–	0	.415
Wagner ‍‍‍	11	–	17	–	0	.393	17	–	34	–	0	.333
Long Island ‍‍‍	10	–	17	–	0	.370	16	–	35	–	0	.314
Fairleigh Dickinson ‍‍‍	4	–	23	–	0	.148	9	–	45	–	0	.167
† – Conference champion ‡ – Tournament champion y – Invited to the NCAA tournament Rankings from Collegiate Baseball

The 2007 Northeast Conference baseball tournament began on May 24 and ended on May 26, 2007, at New Britain Stadium in New Britain, Connecticut. The league's top four teams competed in the double elimination tournament. Third-seeded Monmouth won their third tournament championship and earned the Northeast Conference's automatic bid to the 2007 NCAA Division I baseball tournament.

== Seeding and format ==
The top four finishers were seeded one through four based on conference regular-season winning percentage.

Team	Wins	Losses	Pct.	GB	Seed
Quinnipiac	21	7	.750	—	1
Mount St. Mary's	21	7	.750	—	2
Monmouth	17	10	.630	3.5	3
Central Connecticut	14	14	.500	7	4
Sacred Heart	12	15	.444	8.5	—
Wagner	11	17	.393	10	—
Long Island	10	17	.370	10.5	—
Fairleigh Dickinson	4	23	.148	16.5	—

== Bracket ==
First round
1	Quinnipiac	2
4	Central Connecticut	3
3	Monmouth	9
2	Mount St. Mary's	0
Lower round 1
1	Quinnipiac	4
2	Mount St. Mary's	1

Semi-finals
4	Central Connecticut	1
3	Monmouth	7
Lower final
4	Central Connecticut	5
1	Quinnipiac	0

Finals
3	Monmouth	2	7
4	Central Connecticut	4	1

== All-Tournament Team ==
The following players were named to the All-Tournament Team.

Pos	Name	School
P	Brad Brach	Monmouth
P	Matt Coulson	Monmouth
P	Pat Egan	Quinnipiac
P	Adam Piechowski	Central Connecticut
P	Matt Gianini	Central Connecticut
P	Evan Scribner	Central Connecticut
1B	Andy Meyers	Monmouth
OF	Tim Binkoski	Quinnipiac
OF	Kyle Messineo	Monmouth

=== Most Valuable Player ===
Matt Coulson was named Tournament Most Valuable Player. Coulson, a pitcher for Monmouth, pitched 7.2 innings allowing one run on five hits in the decisive final game.
