= 2009 Northeast Conference baseball tournament =

Baseball tournament, Connecticut, U.S.

- Teams: 4
- Format: Double-elimination tournament
- Finals site: New Britain Stadium; New Britain, CT
- Champions: Monmouth (4th title)
- Winning coach: Dean Ehehalt (4th title)
- MVP: Chris Collazo (Monmouth)

2009 Northeast Conference baseball standings
	Conf.						Overall
Team	W		L		T	PCT	W		L		T	PCT
Wagner ‍†‍‍	17	–	9	–	0	.654	31	–	21	–	0	.596
Sacred Heart ‍‍‍	16	–	10	–	0	.615	29	–	27	–	1	.518
Central Connecticut ‍‍‍	16	–	11	–	0	.593	26	–	22	–	0	.542
Monmouth ‍‍‡‍^{y}	15	–	11	–	0	.577	32	–	25	–	0	.561
Mount St. Mary's ‍‍‍	15	–	11	–	0	.577	23	–	25	–	0	.479
Quinnipiac ‍‍‍	11	–	17	–	0	.393	18	–	34	–	0	.346
Fairleigh Dickinson ‍‍‍	11	–	17	–	0	.393	16	–	34	–	0	.320
Long Island ‍‍‍	6	–	21	–	0	.222	10	–	40	–	0	.200
† – Conference champion ‡ – Tournament champion y – Invited to the NCAA tournament Rankings from Collegiate Baseball

The 2009 Northeast Conference baseball tournament began on May 21 and ended on May 23, 2009, at New Britain Stadium in New Britain, Connecticut. The league's top four teams competed in the double elimination tournament. Fourth-seeded Monmouth won their fourth tournament championship and earned the Northeast Conference's automatic bid to the 2009 NCAA Division I baseball tournament.

== Seeding and format ==
The top four finishers were seeded one through four based on conference regular-season winning percentage.

Team	Wins	Losses	Pct.	GB	Seed
Wagner	17	9	.654	—	1
Sacred Heart	16	10	.615	1	2
Central Connecticut	16	11	.593	1.5	3
Monmouth	15	11	.577	2	4
Mount St. Mary's	15	11	.577	2	—
Quinnipiac	11	17	.393	7	—
Fairleigh Dickinson	11	17	.393	7	—
Long Island	6	21	.222	11.5	—

== Bracket ==
First round
1	Wagner	8
4	Monmouth	14
3	Central Connecticut	13
2	Sacred Heart	16
Lower round 1
1	Wagner	6^{10}
3	Central Connecticut	5

Semi-finals
4	Monmouth	7^{11}
2	Sacred Heart	6
Lower final
2	Sacred Heart	5
1	Wagner	4

Finals
4	Monmouth	14
2	Sacred Heart	8

== All-Tournament Team ==
The following players were named to the All-Tournament Team.

Pos.	Name	School
RHP	Matt Goitz	Monmouth
C	Jeff Heppner	Sacred Heart
1B	Jeff Hanson	Sacred Heart
2B	Chris Collazo	Monmouth
2B	Steve Tedesco	Sacred Heart
SS	Brian Martutartus	Wagner
3B	Ryan Terry	Monmouth
OF	Brett Holland	Monmouth
OF	Richie Tri	Central Connecticut

=== Most Valuable Player ===
Chris Collazo was named Tournament Most Valuable Player. Collazo was a second baseman for Monmouth who hit .600 (9-for-15) and drove in six runs over the three games.
