= Gary Puccio =

Current position
- Title: Assistant coach
- Team: Ohio Christian Trailblazers
- Conference: River States Conference

Biographical details
- Education: LIU Post

Coaching career (HC unless noted)
- 1989–1993: Old Westbury
- 1994–1998: Manhattan
- 1999–2002: Suffolk County CC
- 2006–2010: Briarcliffe
- 2011–2018: Fairleigh Dickinson

Head coaching record
- Overall: 181–409–2

Accomplishments and honors

Awards
- MAAC Coach of the Year: 1996, 1998; Knickerbocker Conference Coach of the Year: 1993 NJCBA Division 1 Coach of the year 2012

Gary Puccio is an American college baseball coach and former player. He was the head coach of the Fairleigh Dickinson Knights baseball team from 2011 to 2018.

Puccio earned his degree at C. W. Post, and later added a pair of master's degrees from Dowling College. He served as a scout for the Seattle Mariners organization for many years, and as head coach at several levels of baseball. He began at Division III SUNY Old Westbury for five seasons before moving to his first Division I job at Manhattan. He helped develop a struggling program and registered 20 wins in 1998, the first time the Jaspers had accomplished that since 1903. He then coached at Suffolk County Community College for four seasons. He later led USCAA Briarcliffe to five straight national tournaments, including a pair of national championships, from 2006–2010. He took over at Fairleigh Dickinson in the summer of 2010. Prior to taking over the Knights, he also taught math at Island Trees High School in Levittown, New York, coaching baseball while not working at the college level.

== Head coaching record ==
This table depicts Puccio's record as a head coach at the Division I level.

Record table
Season	Team	Overall	Conference	Standing	Postseason
Manhattan Jaspers (Metro Atlantic Athletic Conference) (1994–1998)
1994	Manhattan	2–31	2–16		
1995	Manhattan	5–42	1–17		
1996	Manhattan	9–30	4–13		
1997	Manhattan	11–28–1	6–12		
1998	Manhattan	20–21	14–12		
Manhattan:		47–152–1	27–70		
Fairleigh Dickinson Knights (Northeast Conference) (2011–2018)
2011	Fairleigh Dickinson	12–38	9–23	8th (9)	
2012	Fairleigh Dickinson	24–26–1	18–14	5th (9)	NEC Tournament (Note: The top four finishers of the NEC's eight eligible teams qualified for the tournament in 2012. Bryant was ineligible as they transitioned to Division I.)
2013	Fairleigh Dickinson	12–36	7–25	8th (9)	
2014	Fairleigh Dickinson	15–32	6–18	7th (7)	
2015	Fairleigh Dickinson	21–26	11–13	4th (7)	NEC Tournament
2016	Fairleigh Dickinson	28–28	16–15	3rd (7)	NEC Tournament
2017	Fairleigh Dickinson	12–34	8–18	6th (7)	
2018	Fairleigh Dickinson	10–37	1–26	7th (7)	
Fairleigh Dickinson:		134–257–1	76–152		
Total:		181–409–2			
National champion Postseason invitational champion Conference regular season champion Conference regular season and conference tournament champion Division regular season champion Division regular season and conference tournament champion Conference tournament champion
