= 2002 Northeast Conference baseball tournament =

Baseball tournament, New Jersey, U.S.

- Teams: 4
- Format: Double-elimination tournament
- Finals site: FirstEnergy Park; Lakewood, NJ
- Champions: Central Connecticut (1st title)
- Winning coach: Charlie Hickey (1st title)
- MVP: Kevin Rival (Central Connecticut)

2002 Northeast Conference baseball standings
	Conf.				Overall
Team	W		L	PCT	W		L	PCT
Monmouth ‍†‍‍	23	–	4	.852	30	–	21	.588
UMBC ‍‍‍	20	–	7	.741	32	–	24	.571
Central Connecticut ‍‍‡‍^{y}	18	–	9	.667	34	–	23	.596
St. Francis ‍‍‍	17	–	10	.630	22	–	24	.478
Sacred Heart ‍‍‍	14	–	13	.519	20	–	27	.426
Mount St. Mary's ‍‍‍	10	–	16	.385	17	–	35	.327
Quinnipiac ‍‍‍	9	–	18	.333	12	–	30	.286
Long Island ‍‍‍	8	–	19	.296	11	–	33	.250
Wagner ‍‍‍	8	–	19	.296	10	–	39	.204
Fairleigh Dickinson ‍‍‍	7	–	19	.269	9	–	35	.205
† – Conference champion ‡ – Tournament champion y – Invited to the NCAA tournament Rankings from Collegiate Baseball

The 2002 Northeast Conference baseball tournament began on May 17 and ended on May 19, 2002, at FirstEnergy Park in Lakewood, New Jersey. The league's top four teams competed in the double elimination tournament. Third-seeded Central Connecticut won their first of three consecutive tournament championships and earned the Northeast Conference's automatic bid to the 2002 NCAA Division I baseball tournament.

== Seeding and format ==
The top four finishers were seeded one through four based on conference regular season winning percentage.

Team	Wins	Losses	Pct.	GB	Seed
Monmouth	23	4	.852	—	1
UMBC	20	7	.741	3	2
Central Connecticut	18	9	.667	5	3
St. Francis	17	10	.630	6	4
Sacred Heart	14	13	.519	9	—
Mount St. Mary's	10	16	.385	12.5	—
Quinnipiac	9	18	.333	14	—
Long Island	8	19	.296	15	—
Wagner	8	19	.296	15	—
Fairleigh Dickinson	7	19	.269	16	—

== Bracket ==
First round
1	Monmouth	3
4	St. Francis	2
3	Central Connecticut	5
2	UMBC	3
Lower round 1
4	St. Francis	0
2	UMBC	1

Semi-finals
1	Monmouth	5
3	Central Connecticut	7
Lower final
1	Monmouth	2
2	UMBC	8

Finals
3	Central Connecticut	11
2	UMBC	2

== Most Valuable Player ==
Kevin Rival of Central Connecticut was named Tournament Most Valuable Player. Rival earned a win in the Blue Devils' opener against UMBC, and a save against Monmouth while also batting .300 with two doubles and three RBI for the tournament.
