= 2011 Northeast Conference baseball tournament =

Baseball tournament, Connecticut, U.S.

- Teams: 4
- Format: Double-elimination tournament
- Finals site: Senator Thomas J. Dodd Memorial Stadium; Norwich, CT
- Champions: Sacred Heart (2nd title)
- Winning coach: Nick Giaquinto (2nd title)
- MVP: Troy Scribner (Sacred Heart)

2011 Northeast Conference baseball standings
	Conf.						Overall
Team	W		L		T	PCT	W		L		T	PCT
Monmouth ‍†‍‍	25	–	7	–	0	.781	36	–	19	–	0	.655
Sacred Heart ‍‍‡‍^{y}	23	–	9	–	0	.719	34	–	23	–	0	.596
Long Island ‍‍‍	19	–	11	–	0	.633	28	–	23	–	0	.549
Bryant ‍‍‍	19	–	12	–	0	.613	30	–	23	–	0	.566
Central Connecticut ‍‍‍	17	–	14	–	0	.548	26	–	25	–	1	.510
Wagner ‍‍‍	12	–	20	–	0	.375	18	–	33	–	0	.353
Quinnipiac ‍‍‍	11	–	21	–	0	.344	15	–	32	–	0	.319
Fairleigh Dickinson ‍‍‍	9	–	23	–	0	.281	12	–	38	–	0	.240
Mount St. Mary's ‍‍‍	7	–	25	–	0	.219	15	–	35	–	0	.300
† – Conference champion ‡ – Tournament champion y – Invited to the NCAA tournament Rankings from Collegiate Baseball

The 2011 Northeast Conference baseball tournament began on May 20 and ended on May 22, 2011, at Senator Thomas J. Dodd Memorial Stadium in Norwich, Connecticut. The league's top four teams competed in the double elimination tournament. Second-seeded Sacred Heart won their second tournament championship and earned the Northeast Conference's automatic bid to the 2011 NCAA Division I baseball tournament. The Pioneers were runners up in the previous two years

== Seeding and format ==
The top four finishers were seeded one through four based on conference regular-season winning percentage. Bryant was ineligible for postseason play, as it completed its transition to Division I.

Team	Wins	Losses	Pct.	GB	Seed
Monmouth	25	7	.781	–	1
Sacred Heart	23	9	.719	2	2
Long Island	19	11	.633	5	3
Bryant	19	12	.613	5.5	–
Central Connecticut	17	14	.548	7.5	4
Wagner	12	20	.375	13	–
Quinnipiac	11	21	.344	14	–
Fairleigh Dickinson	9	23	.281	16	—
Mount St. Mary's	7	25	.219	18	–

== Bracket ==
First round
1	Monmouth	2
4	Central Connecticut	1
3	Long Island	1
2	Sacred Heart	10
Lower round 1
4	Central Connecticut	2
3	Long Island	1

Semi-finals
1	Monmouth	1
2	Sacred Heart	6
Lower final
1	Monmouth	6
4	Sacred Heart	3

Finals
2	Sacred Heart	9
1	Monmouth	2

== All-Tournament Team ==
The following players were named to the All-Tournament Team.

Pos.	Name	School	Class
P	Nick Leiningen	Sacred Heart	FR
P	Pat Light	Monmouth	SO
P	Matt McCormick	Long Island	SO
P	Nick Meyers	Monmouth	SR
P	Troy Scribner	Sacred Heart	SO
C	Derick Horn	Sacred Heart	FR
SS	John Murphy	Sacred Heart	SO
INF	Ryan Terry	Monmouth	SR
LF	Dylan DelaCruz	Central Connecticut	FR

=== Most Valuable Player ===
John Murphy was named Tournament Most Valuable Player. Murphy was a sophomore shortstop for Sacred Heart.
