= 2003 Northeast Conference baseball tournament =

Baseball tournament, New Jersey, U.S.

- Teams: 4
- Format: Double-elimination tournament
- Finals site: FirstEnergy Park; Lakewood, NJ
- Champions: Central Connecticut (2nd title)
- Winning coach: Charlie Hickey (2nd title)
- MVP: Zack Herrick (Central Connecticut)

2003 Northeast Conference baseball standings
	Conf.						Overall
Team	W		L		T	PCT	W		L		T	PCT
Central Connecticut ‍†‍‡‍^{y}	19	–	6	–	0	.760	31	–	17	–	2	.640
St. Francis ‍‍‍	17	–	10	–	0	.630	21	–	21	–	1	.500
Monmouth ‍‍‍	15	–	11	–	0	.577	24	–	27	–	0	.471
UMBC ‍‍‍	15	–	12	–	0	.556	20	–	27	–	0	.426
Quinnipiac ‍‍‍	14	–	13	–	0	.519	17	–	24	–	0	.415
Fairleigh Dickinson ‍‍‍	12	–	15	–	0	.444	14	–	25	–	0	.359
Long Island ‍‍‍	11	–	15	–	0	.423	16	–	24	–	0	.400
Mount St. Mary's ‍‍‍	9	–	14	–	0	.391	14	–	23	–	0	.378
Wagner ‍‍‍	10	–	16	–	0	.385	11	–	36	–	0	.234
Sacred Heart ‍‍‍	7	–	17	–	0	.292	13	–	29	–	0	.310
† – Conference champion ‡ – Tournament champion y – Invited to the NCAA tournament Rankings from Collegiate Baseball

The 2003 Northeast Conference baseball tournament began on May 16 and ended on May 18, 2003, at FirstEnergy Park in Lakewood, New Jersey. The league's top four teams competed in the double elimination tournament. Top-seeded Central Connecticut won their second of three consecutive tournament championships and earned the Northeast Conference's automatic bid to the 2003 NCAA Division I baseball tournament.

== Seeding and format ==
The top four finishers were seeded one through four based on conference regular-season winning percentage.

Team	Wins	Losses	Pct.	GB	Seed
Central Connecticut	19	6	.760	—	1
St. Francis	17	10	.630	3	2
Monmouth	15	11	.577	4.5	3
UMBC	15	12	.556	5	4
Quinnipiac	14	13	.519	6	—
Fairleigh Dickinson	12	15	.444	8	—
Long Island	11	15	.423	8.5	—
Mount St. Mary's	9	14	.391	9	—
Wagner	10	16	.385	9.5	—
Sacred Heart	7	17	.292	11.5	—

== Bracket ==
First round
1	Central Connecticut	8
4	UMBC	1
3	Monmouth	2
2	St. Francis	0
Lower round 1
4	UMBC	1
2	St. Francis	0

Semi-finals
1	Central Connecticut	2
3	Monmouth	0
Lower final
3	Monmouth	11
4	UMBC	2

Finals
1	Central Connecticut	4
3	Monmouth	0

== Most Valuable Player ==
Zack Herrick of Central Connecticut was named Tournament Most Valuable Player. Herrick pitched 8 innings, allowing no runs while striking out three and walking four to win the final game.
