= 2010 Northeast Conference baseball tournament =

Baseball tournament, New Jersey, U.S.

- Teams: 4
- Format: Double-elimination tournament
- Finals site: TD Bank Ballpark; Bridgewater, NJ
- Champions: Central Connecticut (4th title)
- Winning coach: Charlie Hickey (4th title)
- MVP: Pat Epps (Central Connecticut)

2010 Northeast Conference baseball standings
	Conf.				Overall
Team	W		L	PCT	W		L	PCT
Bryant ‍†‍‍	25	–	7	.781	34	–	22	.607
Sacred Heart ‍‍‍	20	–	12	.625	31	–	27	.534
Central Connecticut ‍‍‡‍^{y}	18	–	14	.563	33	–	23	.589
Wagner ‍‍‍	17	–	15	.531	26	–	31	.456
Monmouth ‍‍‍	15	–	17	.469	22	–	27	.449
Mount St. Mary's ‍‍‍	14	–	18	.438	20	–	31	.392
Quinnipiac ‍‍‍	13	–	19	.406	14	–	39	.264
Fairleigh Dickinson ‍‍‍	11	–	21	.344	16	–	38	.296
Long Island ‍‍‍	11	–	21	.344	14	–	42	.250
† – Conference champion ‡ – Tournament champion y – Invited to the NCAA tournament Rankings from Collegiate Baseball

The 2010 Northeast Conference baseball tournament began on May 20 and ended on May 22, 2010, at TD Bank Ballpark in Bridgewater, New Jersey. The league's top four teams competed in the double elimination tournament. Second-seeded Central Connecticut won their fourth tournament championship and earned the Northeast Conference's automatic bid to the 2010 NCAA Division I baseball tournament.

== Seeding and format ==
The top four finishers were seeded one through four based on conference regular-season winning percentage. Bryant was ineligible for postseason play, as it completed its transition to Division I.

Team	Wins	Losses	Pct.	GB	Seed
Bryant	25	7	.781	–	–
Sacred Heart	20	12	.625	5	1
Central Connecticut	18	14	.563	7	2
Wagner	17	15	.531	8	3
Monmouth	15	17	.469	10	4
Mount St. Mary's	14	18	.438	11	–
Quinnipiac	13	19	.406	12	–
Fairleigh Dickinson	11	21	.344	14	—
Long Island	11	21	.344	14	–

== Bracket ==
First round
1	Sacred Heart	5
4	Monmouth	4
3	Wagner	3
2	Central Connecticut	5
Lower round 1
4	Monmouth	4
3	Wagner	9

Semi-finals
1	Sacred Heart	8
2	Central Connecticut	3
Lower final
2	Central Connecticut	7
3	Wagner	2

Finals
1	Sacred Heart	6	3
2	Central Connecticut	9	9

== All-Tournament Team ==
The following players were named to the All-Tournament Team.

Pos.	Name	School	Class
P	Jared Balbach	Sacred Heart	SR
P	Kyle Breese	Monmouth	SR
P	Jason Foster	Central Connecticut	SO
P	Tyler Riordan	Central Connecticut	SR
P	Troy Scribner	Sacred Heart	FR
1B	Vin Avella	Wagner	SR
SS	John Murphy	Sacred Heart	FR
OF	Pat Epps	Central Connecticut	JR
OF	Kyle Zarotney	Central Connecticut	JR

=== Most Valuable Player ===
Pat Epps was named Tournament Most Valuable Player. Epps was a Junior outfielder for Central Connecticut.
