= 2004 Northeast Conference baseball tournament =

Baseball tournament, New Jersey, U.S.

- Teams: 4
- Format: Double-elimination tournament
- Finals site: FirstEnergy Park; Lakewood, NJ
- Champions: Central Connecticut (3rd title)
- Winning coach: Charlie Hickey (3rd title)
- MVP: Evan Scribner (Central Connecticut)

2004 Northeast Conference baseball standings
	Conf.						Overall
Team	W		L		T	PCT	W		L		T	PCT
Central Connecticut ‍†‍‡‍^{y}	20	–	4	–	0	.833	41	–	17	–	1	.703
Quinnipiac ‍‍‍	16	–	7	–	0	.696	23	–	21	–	0	.523
Monmouth ‍‍‍	13	–	10	–	0	.565	22	–	29	–	1	.433
Wagner ‍‍‍	12	–	11	–	0	.522	20	–	29	–	0	.408
Fairleigh Dickinson ‍‍‍	11	–	13	–	0	.458	12	–	28	–	0	.300
Mount St. Mary's ‍‍‍	10	–	13	–	0	.435	25	–	18	–	0	.581
Sacred Heart ‍‍‍	10	–	14	–	0	.417	12	–	36	–	0	.250
Long Island ‍‍‍	7	–	16	–	0	.304	9	–	29	–	0	.237
St. Francis ‍‍‍	6	–	17	–	0	.261	12	–	30	–	0	.286
† – Conference champion ‡ – Tournament champion y – Invited to the NCAA tournament Rankings from Collegiate Baseball

The 2004 Northeast Conference baseball tournament began on May 21 and ended on May 23, 2004, at FirstEnergy Park in Lakewood, New Jersey. The league's top four teams competed in the double elimination tournament. Top-seeded Central Connecticut won their third consecutive, and third overall, tournament championship and earned the Northeast Conference's automatic bid to the 2004 NCAA Division I baseball tournament.

== Seeding and format ==
The top four finishers were seeded one through four based on conference regular-season winning percentage.

Team	Wins	Losses	Pct.	GB	Seed
Central Connecticut	20	4	.833	—	1
Quinnipiac	16	7	.696	3.5	2
Monmouth	13	10	.565	6.5	3
Wagner	12	11	.522	7.5	4
Fairleigh Dickinson	11	13	.458	9	—
Mount St. Mary's	10	13	.435	9.5	—
Sacred Heart	10	14	.417	10	—
Long Island	7	16	.304	12.5	—
St. Francis	6	17	.261	13.5	—

== Bracket ==
First round
1	Central Connecticut	4
4	Wagner	9
3	Monmouth	16
2	Quinnipiac	1
Lower round 1
1	Central Connecticut	11
2	Quinnipiac	4

Semi-finals
4	Wagner	13
3	Monmouth	4
Lower final
3	Monmouth	1
1	Central Connecticut	9

Finals
4	Wagner	4	3
1	Central Connecticut	5	10

== Most Valuable Player ==
Evan Scribner of Central Connecticut was named Tournament Most Valuable Player. Scribner pitched in four of the five tournament games that Central Connecticut played in.
