= 2015 Northeast Conference baseball tournament =

- Teams: 4
- Format: Double-elimination tournament
- Finals site: Senator Thomas J. Dodd Memorial Stadium; Norwich, CT
- Champions: Sacred Heart (4th title)
- Winning coach: Nick Giaquinto (4th title)
- MVP: Jesus Medina (Sacred Heart)

2015 Northeast Conference baseball standings
| | Conf. | | | | | | Overall |
| Team | W | | L | | T | PCT | W | | L | | T | PCT |
|---|---|---|---|---|---|---|---|---|---|---|---|---|
| Bryant ‍†‍‍ | 17 | – | 7 | – | 0 | .708 | 29 | – | 25 | – | 0 | .537 |
| Wagner ‍‍‍ | 15 | – | 9 | – | 0 | .625 | 27 | – | 23 | – | 1 | .539 |
| Sacred Heart ‍‍‡‍^{y} | 13 | – | 11 | – | 0 | .542 | 23 | – | 32 | – | 1 | .420 |
| Fairleigh Dickinson ‍‍‍ | 11 | – | 13 | – | 0 | .458 | 21 | – | 26 | – | 0 | .447 |
| LIU Brooklyn ‍‍‍ | 10 | – | 14 | – | 0 | .417 | 17 | – | 34 | – | 0 | .333 |
| Mount St. Mary's ‍‍‍ | 10 | – | 14 | – | 0 | .417 | 12 | – | 31 | – | 0 | .279 |
| Central Connecticut ‍‍‍ | 8 | – | 16 | – | 0 | .333 | 15 | – | 33 | – | 0 | .313 |
† – Conference champion ‡ – Tournament champion y – Invited to the NCAA tournament Rankings from Collegiate Baseball

The 2015 Northeast Conference baseball tournament began on May 21 and ended on May 24 at Senator Thomas J. Dodd Memorial Stadium in Norwich, Connecticut. The league's top four teams finishers competed in the double elimination tournament. Sacred Heart won their fourth tournament championship to earn the Northeast Conference's automatic bid to the 2015 NCAA Division I baseball tournament.

== Seeding and format ==
The top four finishers will be seeded one through four based on conference regular-season winning percentage. They will then play a double-elimination tournament.

| Team | W | L | Pct | GB | Seed |
|---|---|---|---|---|---|
| Bryant | 17 | 7 | .708 | — | 1 |
| Wagner | 15 | 9 | .625 | 2 | 2 |
| Sacred Heart | 13 | 11 | .542 | 4 | 3 |
| Fairleigh Dickinson | 11 | 13 | .458 | 6 | 4 |
| LIU Brooklyn | 10 | 14 | .417 | 7 | — |
| Mount St. Mary's | 10 | 14 | .417 | 7 | — |
| Central Connecticut | 8 | 16 | .333 | 9 | — |

== Bracket ==
First round
1 | Bryant | 2
4 | Fairleigh Dickinson | 7
2 | Wagner | 1
3 | Sacred Heart | 3
Lower round 1
1 | Bryant | 4
2 | Wagner | 2

Semi-finals
4 | Fairleigh Dickinson | 0
3 | Sacred Heart | 10
Lower final
1 | Bryant | 7
4 | Fairleigh Dickinson | 0

Finals
3 | Sacred Heart | 2 | 5
1 | Bryant | 5 | 4

== All-Tournament Team ==
The following players were named to the All-Tournament Team.

| POS | Name | School |
|---|---|---|
| RHP | James Cooksey | Sacred Heart |
| RHP | James Davitt | Bryant |
| RHP | Jason Foley | Sacred Heart |
| INF/P | Jesus Medina | Sacred Heart |
| C | Buck McCarthy | Bryant |
| INF | Brandon Bingel | Bryant |
| INF | PJ DeFilippo | Sacred Heart |
| SS | Zack Short | Sacred Heart |
| OF | Shane Siebler | Fairleigh Dickinson |

=== Most Valuable Player ===
Jesus Medina was named Tournament Most Valuable Player. Medina was an infielder and pitcher for Sacred Heart, and batted .444 with a tournament-high eight hits and six runs scored while also pitching 7 one-run innings in the first matchup with Bryant.
