= 1999 Northeast Conference baseball tournament =

Baseball tournament, Connecticut, U.S.

- Teams: 4
- Format: Double-elimination tournament
- Finals site: The Ballpark at Harbor Yard; Bridgeport, CT
- Champions: Monmouth (2nd title)
- Winning coach: Dean Ehehalt (2nd title)
- MVP: Mike Benfield (Monmouth)

1999 Northeast Conference baseball standings
	Conf.						Overall
Team	W		L		T	PCT	W		L		T	PCT
North
Fairleigh Dickinson ^{x}‍‍‍	12	–	8	–	0	.600	22	–	24	–	0	.478
Central Connecticut ^{x}‍‍‍	12	–	8	–	0	.600	22	–	22	–	1	.500
St. Francis ‍‍‍	11	–	9	–	0	.550	18	–	30	–	0	.375
Long Island ‍‍‍	11	–	9	–	0	.550	25	–	19	–	0	.568
Quinnipiac ‍‍‍	7	–	13	–	0	.350	17	–	23	–	0	.425
South
Monmouth ^{x}‍‍‡‍^{y}	12	–	7	–	0	.632	26	–	24	–	0	.520
Wagner ‍‍‍	10	–	9	–	0	.526	20	–	23	–	0	.465
UMBC ‍‍‍	8	–	11	–	0	.421	20	–	22	–	0	.476
Mount St. Mary's ‍‍‍	5	–	14	–	0	.263	12	–	31	–	0	.279
x – Division champion ‡ – Tournament champion y – Invited to the NCAA tournament Rankings from Collegiate Baseball

The 1999 Northeast Conference baseball tournament began on May 7 and ended on May 10, 1999, at The Ballpark at Harbor Yard in Bridgeport, Connecticut. The league's top four teams competed in the double elimination tournament. Top-seeded Monmouth won their second consecutive, and second overall, tournament championship and earned the Northeast Conference's automatic bid to the 1999 NCAA Division I baseball tournament.

== Seeding and format ==
The two division winners claimed the top two seeds, with the next two teams by conference winning percentage rounding out the field. They played a double-elimination tournament.

North Division
Team	W	L	Pct	GB	Seed
Fairleigh Dickinson	12	8	.600	—	2
Central Connecticut	12	8	.600	—	3
St. Francis	11	9	.550	1	4
Long Island	11	9	.550	1	—
Quinnipiac	7	13	.350	5	—

South Division
Team	W	L	Pct	GB	Seed
Monmouth	12	7	.632	—	1
Wagner	10	9	.526	2	—
UMBC	8	11	.421	4	—
Mount St. Mary's	5	14	.263	7	—

== Bracket ==
First round
1	Monmouth	8
4	St. Francis	3
3	Central Connecticut	9
2	Fairleigh Dickinson	4
Lower round 1
4	St. Francis	7
2	Fairleigh Dickinson	25

Semi-finals
1	Monmouth	2
3	Central Connecticut	1
Lower final
3	Central Connecticut	1
2	Fairleigh Dickinson	7

Finals
1	Monmouth	7
2	Fairleigh Dickinson	6

== Most Valuable Player ==
Mike Benfield of Monmouth was named Tournament Most Valuable Player. Benfield pitched in the opener and the final game for the Hawks, allowing 2 earned runs and striking out ten in 10 2/3 innings.
