= 2008 Northeast Conference baseball tournament =

Baseball tournament, New Jersey, U.S.

- Teams: 4
- Format: Double-elimination tournament
- Finals site: Bernie Robbins Stadium; Atlantic City, NJ
- Champions: Mount St. Mary's (1st title)
- Winning coach: Scott Thomson (1st title)
- MVP: Josh Vittek (Mount St. Mary's)

2008 Northeast Conference baseball standings
	Conf.				Overall
Team	W		L	PCT	W		L	PCT
Monmouth ‍†‍‍	20	–	5	.800	37	–	16	.698
Central Connecticut ‍‍‍	18	–	9	.667	25	–	24	.510
Wagner ‍‍‍	17	–	11	.607	27	–	28	.491
Mount St. Mary's ‍‍‡‍^{y}	13	–	11	.542	21	–	33	.389
Fairleigh Dickinson ‍‍‍	10	–	16	.385	15	–	38	.283
Sacred Heart ‍‍‍	10	–	18	.357	24	–	41	.369
Quinnipiac ‍‍‍	9	–	19	.321	16	–	36	.308
Long Island ‍‍‍	7	–	15	.318	16	–	31	.340
† – Conference champion ‡ – Tournament champion y – Invited to the NCAA tournament Rankings from Collegiate Baseball

The 2008 Northeast Conference baseball tournament began on May 22 and ended on May 24, 2008, at Bernie Robbins Stadium in Atlantic City, New Jersey. The league's top four teams competed in the double elimination tournament. Fourth-seeded Mount St. Mary's won their first tournament championship and earned the Northeast Conference's automatic bid to the 2008 NCAA Division I baseball tournament.

== Seeding and format ==
The top four finishers were seeded one through four based on conference regular-season winning percentage.

Team	Wins	Losses	Pct.	GB	Seed
Monmouth	20	5	.800	—	1
Central Connecticut	18	9	.667	3	2
Wagner	17	11	.607	4.5	3
Mount St. Mary's	13	11	.542	6.5	4
Fairleigh Dickinson	10	16	.385	10.5	—
Sacred Heart	10	18	.357	11.5	—
Quinnipiac	9	19	.321	12.5	—
Long Island	7	15	.318	11.5	—

== Bracket ==
First round
1	Monmouth	12
4	Mount St. Mary's	7
3	Wagner	4
2	Central Connecticut	8
Lower round 1
4	Mount St. Mary's	5^{10}
3	Wagner	1

Semi-finals
1	Monmouth	10^{10}
2	Central Connecticut	9
Lower final
2	Central Connecticut	2
4	Mount St. Mary's	6

Finals
1	Monmouth	3	2
4	Mount St. Mary's	8	14

== All-Tournament Team ==
The following players were named to the All-Tournament Team.

Name	School
Chris Collazo	Monmouth
Matt Eiden	Mount St. Mary’s
Kyle Higgins	Monmouth
Mike Matta	Mount St. Mary’s
Andy Meyers	Monmouth
Ryan Murray	Mount St. Mary’s
Nick Pulsonetti	Monmouth
Josh Vittek	Mount St. Mary’s
Kyle Zarotney	Central Connecticut

=== Most Valuable Player ===
Josh Vittek was named Tournament Most Valuable Player. Vittek hit .458 with eight runs scored, five home runs and 12 RBI for the Tournament.
