= 2001 Northeast Conference baseball tournament =

Baseball tournament, New Jersey, U.S.

- Teams: 4
- Format: Double-elimination tournament
- Finals site: The Sandcastle; Atlantic City, NJ
- Champions: UMBC (1st title)
- Winning coach: John Jancuska (1st title)
- MVP: Eric Weltmer (UMBC)

2001 Northeast Conference baseball standings
	Conf.						Overall
Team	W		L		T	PCT	W		L		T	PCT
North
Central Connecticut ^{x}‍‍‍	14	–	8	–	0	.636	30	–	22	–	0	.577
St. Francis ^{x}‍‍‍	14	–	8	–	0	.636	25	–	22	–	0	.532
Long Island ‍‍‍	13	–	9	–	0	.591	18	–	24	–	0	.429
Sacred Heart ‍‍‍	12	–	10	–	0	.545	22	–	23	–	0	.489
Quinnipiac ‍‍‍	3	–	19	–	0	.136	5	–	37	–	0	.119
South
UMBC ^{x}‍‍‡‍^{y}	17	–	5	–	0	.773	31	–	20	–	2	.604
Monmouth ^{x}‍‍‍	17	–	5	–	0	.773	29	–	24	–	0	.547
Fairleigh Dickinson ‍‍‍	9	–	13	–	0	.409	13	–	27	–	0	.325
Wagner ‍‍‍	8	–	14	–	0	.364	16	–	30	–	1	.351
Mount St. Mary's ‍‍‍	3	–	19	–	0	.136	12	–	37	–	0	.245
x – Division champion ‡ – Tournament champion y – Invited to the NCAA tournament Rankings from Collegiate Baseball

The 2001 Northeast Conference baseball tournament began on May 11 and ended on May 13, 2001, at The Sandcastle in Atlantic City, New Jersey. The league's top four teams competed in the double elimination tournament. Third-seeded UMBC won their first and only tournament championship and earned the Northeast Conference's automatic bid to the 2001 NCAA Division I baseball tournament.

== Seeding and format ==
The two division winners claimed the top two seeds, with the next two teams by conference winning percentage rounding out the field. They played a double-elimination tournament.

North Division
Team	W	L	Pct	GB	Seed
Central Connecticut	14	8	.636	—	2
St. Francis	14	8	.636	—	4
Long Island	13	9	.591	1	—
Sacred Heart	12	10	.545	2	—
Quinnipiac	3	19	.136	11	—

South Division
Team	W	L	Pct	GB	Seed
Monmouth	17	5	.773	—	1
UMBC	17	5	.773	—	3
Fairleigh Dickinson	9	13	.409	8	—
Wagner	8	14	.409	9	—
Mount St. Mary's	3	19	.136	14	—

== Bracket ==
First round
1	Monmouth	7^{10}
4	St. Francis	6
3	UMBC	10
2	Central Connecticut	5
Lower round 1
4	St. Francis	2
2	Central Connecticut	6

Semi-finals
1	Monmouth	10
3	UMBC	16
Lower final
1	Monmouth	9
2	Central Connecticut	5

Finals
3	UMBC	3	4
1	Monmouth	5	1

== Most Valuable Player ==
Eric Weltmer of UMBC was named Tournament Most Valuable Player. Weltmer threw a pair of complete games in the tournament, including the final, with a 2.50 ERA.
