= 2000 Northeast Conference baseball tournament =

Baseball tournament, New Jersey, U.S.

- Teams: 4
- Format: Double-elimination tournament
- Finals site: The Sandcastle; Atlantic City, NJ
- Champions: Wagner (1st title)
- Winning coach: Joe Litterio (1st title)
- MVP: Steve Coppola (Wagner)

2000 Northeast Conference baseball standings
	Conf.						Overall
Team	W		L		T	PCT	W		L		T	PCT
North
Long Island ^{x}‍‍‍	14	–	8	–	0	.636	23	–	21	–	0	.523
Quinnipiac ‍‍‍	11	–	11	–	0	.500	16	–	21	–	0	.432
Central Connecticut ‍‍‍	9	–	11	–	0	.450	17	–	31	–	1	.357
St. Francis ‍‍‍	7	–	12	–	0	.368	11	–	24	–	0	.314
Sacred Heart ‍‍‍	6	–	16	–	0	.273	12	–	38	–	0	.240
South
UMBC ^{x}‍‍‍	16	–	6	–	0	.727	29	–	21	–	1	.578
Monmouth ‍‍‍	15	–	7	–	0	.682	25	–	27	–	0	.481
Wagner ‍‍‡‍^{y}	14	–	8	–	0	.636	24	–	30	–	1	.445
Fairleigh Dickinson ‍‍‍	10	–	11	–	0	.476	15	–	23	–	1	.397
Mount St. Mary's ‍‍‍	5	–	17	–	0	.227	17	–	34	–	0	.333
x – Division champion ‡ – Tournament champion y – Invited to the NCAA tournament Rankings from Collegiate Baseball

The 2000 Northeast Conference baseball tournament began on May 12 and ended on May 14, 2000, at The Sandcastle in Atlantic City, New Jersey. The league's top four teams competed in the double elimination tournament. Fourth-seeded Wagner won their first tournament championship and earned the Northeast Conference's automatic bid to the 2000 NCAA Division I baseball tournament.

== Seeding and format ==
The two division winners claimed the top two seeds, with the next two teams by conference winning percentage rounding out the field. They played a double-elimination tournament.

North Division
Team	W	L	Pct	GB	Seed
Long Island	14	8	.636	—	2
Quinnipiac	11	11	.500	3	—
Central Connecticut	9	11	.450	5	—
St. Francis	7	12	.368	6.5	—
Sacred Heart	6	16	.273	8	—

South Division
Team	W	L	Pct	GB	Seed
UMBC	16	6	.727	—	1
Monmouth	15	7	.682	1	3
Wagner	14	8	.636	2	4
Fairleigh Dickinson	10	11	.476	5.5	—
Mount St. Mary's	5	17	.227	11	—

== Bracket ==
First round
1	UMBC	1
4	Wagner	16
3	Monmouth	11
2	Long Island	8
Lower round 1
1	UMBC	0
2	Long Island	2

Semi-finals
4	Wagner	5
3	Monmouth	0
Lower final
3	Monmouth	5
2	Long Island	4

Finals
4	Wagner	3	7
3	Monmouth	14	3

== Most Valuable Player ==
Steve Coppola of Wagner was named Tournament Most Valuable Player. Rival threw a complete game two-hit shutout in the Seahawks 5–0 win over Monmouth in the winner's bracket matchup.
