= 1995 Northeast Conference baseball tournament =

Baseball tournament, New Jersey, U.S.

- Teams: 4
- Format: Double-elimination tournament
- Finals site: Moody Park; Ewing Township, NJ
- Champions: Rider (2nd title)
- Winning coach: Sonny Pittaro (2nd title)
- MVP: Lou Deman (Long Island)

1995 Northeast Conference baseball standings
	Conf.						Overall
Team	W		L		T	PCT	W		L		T	PCT
Rider ‍†‍‡‍	16	–	5	–	0	.762	35	–	18	–	1	.657
St. Francis ‍‍‍	13	–	8	–	0	.619	26	–	17	–	0	.605
Long Island ‍‍‍	10	–	11	–	0	.476	18	–	28	–	0	.391
Marist ‍‍‍	10	–	11	–	0	.476	14	–	26	–	1	.354
Fairleigh Dickinson ‍‍‍	9	–	12	–	0	.429	20	–	25	–	0	.444
Mount St. Mary's ‍‍‍	9	–	12	–	0	.429	13	–	25	–	0	.342
Wagner ‍‍‍	9	–	12	–	0	.429	15	–	30	–	0	.333
Monmouth ‍‍‍	8	–	13	–	0	.381	19	–	33	–	0	.365
† – Conference champion ‡ – Tournament champion y – Invited to the NCAA tournament Rankings from Collegiate Baseball

The 1995 Northeast Conference baseball tournament was held in May 1995 at Moody Park in Ewing Township, New Jersey. The league's top four teams competed in the double elimination tournament. Top-seeded Rider won their second of three consecutive tournament championships. They then lost a play-in series to Penn for the right to play in the 1995 NCAA Division I baseball tournament.

== Seeding and format ==
The top four finishers were seeded one through four based on conference regular-season winning percentage. They played a double-elimination tournament.

Team	W	L	Pct	GB	Seed
Rider	16	5	.762	—	1
St. Francis	13	8	.619	3	2
Long Island	10	11	.476	6	3
Marist	10	11	.476	6	4
Fairleigh Dickinson	9	12	.429	7	—
Mount St. Mary's	9	12	.429	7	—
Wagner	9	12	.429	7	—
Monmouth	8	13	.381	8	—

== Bracket ==
First round
1	Rider	12
4	Marist	9
3	Long Island	13
2	St. Francis	14^{12}
Lower round 1
4	Marist	2
3	Long Island	5

Semi-finals
1	Rider	14
2	St. Francis	10
Lower final
2	St. Francis	6
3	Long Island	14

Finals
1	Rider	4^{10}
3	Long Island	3

== Most Valuable Player ==
Lou Deman of Long Island was named Tournament Most Valuable Player.
