= 1997 Northeast Conference baseball tournament =

Baseball tournament, New Jersey, U.S.

- Teams: 4
- Format: Double-elimination tournament
- Finals site: Skylands Park; Sussex, NJ
- Champions: Marist (1st title)
- Winning coach: John Szefc (1st title)
- MVP: Ben Shove (Marist)

1997 Northeast Conference baseball standings
	Conf.						Overall
Team	W		L		T	PCT	W		L		T	PCT
Marist ‍†‍‡‍^{y}	14	–	7	–	0	.667	32	–	19	–	0	.627
Fairleigh Dickinson ‍†‍‍	14	–	7	–	0	.667	23	–	24	–	1	.490
Wagner ‍‍‍	12	–	9	–	0	.571	17	–	29	–	2	.375
Rider ‍‍‍	12	–	9	–	0	.571	20	–	29	–	0	.408
Monmouth ‍‍‍	11	–	10	–	0	.524	23	–	25	–	0	.479
Long Island ‍‍‍	10	–	11	–	0	.476	17	–	21	–	0	.447
St. Francis ‍‍‍	6	–	15	–	0	.286	15	–	24	–	0	.385
Mount St. Mary's ‍‍‍	5	–	16	–	0	.238	10	–	23	–	1	.309
† – Conference champion ‡ – Tournament champion y – Invited to the NCAA tournament Rankings from Collegiate Baseball

The 1997 Northeast Conference baseball tournament was held in May 1997 at Skylands Park in Sussex, New Jersey. The league's top four teams competed in the double elimination tournament. Top-seeded Marist won their first and only tournament championship then won the NCAA play-in series against Siena to advance to the 1997 NCAA Division I baseball tournament.

== Seeding and format ==
The top four finishers were seeded one through four based on conference regular-season winning percentage. They played a double-elimination tournament.

Team	W	L	Pct	GB	Seed
Marist	14	7	.667	—	1
Fairleigh Dickinson	14	7	.667	—	2
Wagner	12	9	.571	2	3
Rider	12	9	.571	2	4
Monmouth	11	10	.524	3	—
Long Island	10	11	.476	4	—
St. Francis	6	15	.286	8	—
Mount St. Mary's	5	16	.238	9	—

== Bracket ==
First round
1	Marist	4
4	Rider	1
3	Wagner	4
2	Fairleigh Dickinson	7
Lower round 1
4	Rider	20
3	Wagner	6

Semi-finals
1	Marist	5
2	Fairleigh Dickinson	6
Lower final
1	Marist	6
4	Rider	3

Finals
2	Fairleigh Dickinson	2	4
1	Marist	5	5

== Most Valuable Player ==
Ben Shove of Marist was named Tournament Most Valuable Player.
