= 2012 Northeast Conference baseball tournament =

Baseball tournament, Connecticut, U.S.

- 2012 Northeast Conference baseball tournament logo
- Teams: 4
- Format: Double-elimination tournament
- Finals site: Senator Thomas J. Dodd Memorial Stadium; Norwich, CT
- Champions: Sacred Heart (3rd title)
- Winning coach: Nick Giaquinto (3rd title)
- MVP: Troy Scribner (Sacred Heart)

2012 Northeast Conference baseball standings
	Conf.						Overall
Team	W		L		T	PCT	W		L		T	PCT
Bryant ‍†‍‍	24	–	8	–	0	.750	33	–	21	–	0	.611
Monmouth ‍‍‍	21	–	11	–	0	.656	35	–	24	–	0	.593
Central Connecticut ‍‍‍	19	–	13	–	0	.594	28	–	24	–	0	.538
Sacred Heart ‍‍‡‍^{y}	19	–	13	–	0	.594	25	–	32	–	0	.439
Fairleigh Dickinson ‍‍‍	18	–	14	–	0	.563	25	–	28	–	1	.472
Wagner ‍‍‍	15	–	17	–	0	.469	22	–	33	–	0	.400
Long Island ‍‍‍	13	–	19	–	0	.406	22	–	33	–	0	.400
Quinnipiac ‍‍‍	8	–	24	–	0	.250	9	–	38	–	0	.191
Mount St. Mary's ‍‍‍	7	–	25	–	0	.219	14	–	40	–	0	.259
† – Conference champion ‡ – Tournament champion y – Invited to the NCAA tournament Rankings from Collegiate Baseball

The 2012 Northeast Conference baseball tournament began on May 17 and ended on May 19 at Senator Thomas J. Dodd Memorial Stadium in Norwich, Connecticut. The league's top four teams competed in the double elimination tournament. Second seeded Sacred Heart won their second consecutive, and third overall, tournament championship and earned the Northeast Conference's automatic bid to the 2012 NCAA Division I baseball tournament.

== Seeding and format ==
The top four finishers were seeded one through four based on conference regular-season winning percentage. Bryant was ineligible for postseason play, as it completed its transition to Division I. Sacred Heart claimed the second seed over Central Connecticut by tiebreaker.

Team	Wins	Losses	Pct.	GB	Seed
Bryant	24	8	.750	–	–
Monmouth	21	11	.656	3	1
Sacred Heart	19	13	.594	5	2
Central Connecticut	19	13	.594	5	3
Fairleigh Dickinson	18	14	.563	6	4
Wagner	15	17	.469	9	–
Long Island	13	19	.406	11	–
Quinnipiac	8	24	.250	18	–
Mount St. Mary's	7	25	.219	19	–

== Bracket ==
First round
1	Monmouth	7
4	Fairleigh Dickinson	1
3	Central Connecticut	2
2	Sacred Heart	3
Lower round 1
4	Fairleigh Dickinson	3
3	Central Connecticut	2

Semi-finals
1	Monmouth	0
2	Sacred Heart	6
Lower final
1	Monmouth	5
4	Fairleigh Dickinson	3

Finals
2	Sacred Heart	5
1	Monmouth	1

== All-Tournament Team ==
The following players were named to the All-Tournament Team.

Pos.	Name	School	Class
RHP/1B	Troy Scribner	Sacred Heart	Jr.
LHP	Nick Leiningen	Sacred Heart	So.
RHP	Kody Kerski	Sacred Heart	So.
SS	John Murphy	Sacred Heart	Jr.
2B	Jake Gronsky	Monmouth	So.
RHP	Pat Light	Monmouth	Jr.
RHP/INF	Mike Eliasen	Fairleigh Dickinson	Sr.
LF	Jordan Ritz	Fairleigh Dickinson	Fr.
RHP	Harry Glynne	Central Connecticut	Sr.

=== Most Valuable Player ===
Troy Scribner was named Tournament Most Valuable Player. Scribner was a junior pitcher and first baseman for Sacred Heart. Scribner allowed two runs on seven hits in a complete game victory over Central Connecticut in the first round.
