= 2005 Northeast Conference baseball tournament =

Baseball tournament, New Jersey, U.S.

- Teams: 4
- Format: Double-elimination tournament
- Finals site: FirstEnergy Park; Lakewood, NJ
- Champions: Quinnipiac (1st title)
- Winning coach: Dan Gooley (1st title)
- MVP: Ryan Rizzo (Quinnipiac)

2005 Northeast Conference baseball standings
	Conf.				Overall
Team	W		L	PCT	W		L	PCT
Quinnipiac ‍†‍‡‍^{y}	17	–	6	.739	26	–	24	.520
Sacred Heart ‍‍‍	16	–	8	.667	20	–	33	.377
Monmouth ‍‍‍	15	–	8	.652	30	–	24	.556
Wagner ‍‍‍	13	–	10	.565	22	–	27	.449
Mount St. Mary's ‍‍‍	12	–	11	.522	18	–	27	.400
Fairleigh Dickinson ‍‍‍	10	–	13	.435	12	–	26	.316
Central Connecticut ‍‍‍	10	–	14	.417	19	–	28	.404
Long Island ‍‍‍	9	–	15	.375	13	–	25	.342
St. Francis ‍‍‍	3	–	20	.130	7	–	37	.159
† – Conference champion ‡ – Tournament champion y – Invited to the NCAA tournament Rankings from Collegiate Baseball

The 2005 Northeast Conference baseball tournament began on May 20 and ended on May 23, 2005, at FirstEnergy Park in Lakewood, New Jersey. The league's top four teams competed in the double elimination tournament. Top-seeded Quinnipiac won their first tournament championship and earned the Northeast Conference's automatic bid to the 2005 NCAA Division I baseball tournament.

== Seeding and format ==
The top four finishers were seeded one through four based on conference regular-season winning percentage.

Team	Wins	Losses	Pct.	GB	Seed
Quinnipiac	17	6	.739	—	1
Sacred Heart	16	8	.667	1.5	2
Monmouth	15	8	.652	2	3
Wagner	13	10	.565	4	4
Mount St. Mary's	12	11	.522	5	—
Fairleigh Dickinson	10	13	.435	7	—
Central Connecticut	10	14	.417	7.5	—
Long Island	9	15	.375	8.5	—
St. Francis	3	20	.130	14	—

== Bracket ==
First round
1	Quinnipiac	13
4	Wagner	6
3	Monmouth	0
2	Sacred Heart	3
Lower round 1
4	Wagner	4
3	Monmouth	8

Semi-finals
1	Quinnipiac	7
2	Sacred Heart	0
Lower final
2	Sacred Heart	3
3	Monmouth	10

Finals
1	Quinnipiac	2	7
3	Monmouth	8	3

== Most Valuable Player ==
Ryan Rizzo of Quinnipiac was named Tournament Most Valuable Player. Rizzo, a sophomore, hit safely 11 times in 20 at-bats (.550) with three doubles and three RBI for the tournament.
