= 1998 Northeast Conference baseball tournament =

Baseball tournament, New Jersey, U.S.

- Teams: 4
- Format: Single-elimination tournament
- Finals site: Cochrane Stadium; Jersey City, NJ
- Champions: Monmouth (1st title)
- Winning coach: Dean Ehehalt (1st title)
- MVP: Joe McCullough (Monmouth)

1998 Northeast Conference baseball standings
	Conf.						Overall
Team	W		L		T	PCT	W		L		T	PCT
St. Francis ‍†‍‍	10	–	5	–	0	.667	26	–	12	–	1	.679
Monmouth ‍†‍‡‍^{y}	10	–	5	–	0	.667	30	–	21	–	0	.588
Long Island ‍‍‍	9	–	6	–	0	.600	24	–	14	–	0	.632
Mount St. Mary's ‍‍‍	6	–	9	–	0	.400	9	–	28	–	0	.243
Fairleigh Dickinson ‍‍‍	6	–	9	–	0	.400	15	–	24	–	0	.385
Wagner ‍‍‍	4	–	11	–	0	.267	10	–	35	–	1	.228
† – Conference champion ‡ – Tournament champion y – Invited to the NCAA tournament Rankings from Collegiate Baseball

The 1998 Northeast Conference baseball tournament began on May 11 and ended on May 12, 1998, at Cochrane Stadium in Jersey City, New Jersey. The league's top four teams competed in the single elimination tournament. Rain severely impacted the event, forcing both a venue change and a format change. The tournament was originally intended to be a double-elimination tournament at Waterfront Park in Trenton, New Jersey. Second-seeded Monmouth won their first tournament championship, then won the NCAA play-in series against Navy to advance to the 1998 NCAA Division I baseball tournament.

== Seeding and format ==
The top four finishers were seeded one through four based on conference regular-season winning percentage. Due to rain, the standard double-elimination format was abandoned in favor of a single-elimination tournament.

Team	W	L	Pct	GB	Seed
St. Francis	10	5	.667	—	1
Monmouth	10	5	.667	—	2
Long Island	9	6	.600	1	3
Mount St. Mary's	6	9	.400	4	4
Fairleigh Dickinson	6	9	.400	4	—
Wagner	4	11	.267	6	—

== Bracket ==
Semifinals
1	St. Francis	6
4	Mount St. Mary's	1
3	Long Island	4
2	Monmouth	5

Finals
1	St. Francis	2
2	Monmouth	7

== Most Valuable Player ==
Joe McCullough was named Tournament Most Valuable Player. McCullough was a second baseman for Monmouth.
