= 2025 Northeast Conference baseball tournament =

- Teams: 4
- Format: Double-elimination
- Finals site: Heritage Financial Park; Wappingers Falls, New York
- Champions: Central Connecticut (9th title)
- Winning coach: Charlie Hickey (9th title)
- MVP: Wyatt Cameron (Central Connecticut)
- Television: ESPN+

2025 Northeast Conference baseball standings
	Conf.				Overall
Team	W		L	PCT	W		L	PCT
LIU ‍†‍‍	24	–	6	.800	35	–	23	.603
Central Connecticut ‍‍‡‍^{y}	23	–	7	.767	31	–	17	.646
Wagner ‍‍‍	23	–	7	.767	31	–	22	.585
Stonehill ‍‍‍	18	–	12	.600	20	–	32	.385
Le Moyne ‍‍‍	17	–	13	.567	20	–	28	.417
Fairleigh Dickinson ‍‍‍	16	–	14	.533	16	–	37	.302
Mercyhurst ‍‍‍	15	–	15	.500	17	–	35	.327
Coppin State ‍‍‍	13	–	17	.433	15	–	34	.306
Delaware State ‍‍‍	6	–	24	.200	7	–	34	.171
Maryland Eastern Shore ‍‍‍	6	–	24	.200	7	–	41	.146
Norfolk State ‍‍‍	4	–	26	.133	4	–	38	.095
† – Conference champion ‡ – Tournament champion y – Invited to the NCAA Tournament; As of May 31, 2025; Rankings from D1Baseball

The 2025 Northeast Conference baseball tournament was a postseason baseball tournament for the Northeast Conference in the 2025 NCAA Division I baseball season. The tournament took place from May 23–25, 2025 and was held at Heritage Financial Park in Wappingers Falls, New York. The 32nd annual postseason Northeast tournament, Central Connecticut defeated Long Island to earn the automatic berth to the 2025 NCAA Division I baseball tournament.

The top four regular season finishers of the conference's eleven teams met in a double-elimination tournament.

== Seeding and format ==
The top four finishers of the league's eleven teams qualify for the double-elimination tournament. Teams are seeded based on conference winning percentage, with the first tiebreaker being head-to-head record.

== Bracket ==
First Round
1	Long Island	7
4	Stonehill	2
Winner's bracket
2	Wagner	3
3	Central Connecticut	8
4	Stonehill	4
2	Wagner	6
Loser's bracket

Semifinal
1	Long Island	6
3	Central Connecticut	8
2	Wagner	1
1	Long Island	11

Final
3	Central Connecticut	7	6
1	Long Island	8	5

== Schedule ==
Game	Time*	Matchup^{#}	Score	Notes	Reference
Friday, May 23
1	12:00 pm	No. 4 Stonehill vs No. 1 Long Island	2−7		
2	5:01 pm	No. 3 Central Connecticut vs No. 2 Wagner	8−3		
Saturday, May 24
3	11:00 am	No. 4 Stonehill vs No. 2 Wagner	4−6	Stonehill Eliminated	
4	3:02 pm	No. 3 Central Connecticut vs No. 1 Long Island	8−6		
5	7:31 pm	No. 2 Wagner vs No. 1 Long Island	1−11	Wagner Eliminated	
Sunday, May 25
6	11:00 am	No. 3 Central Connecticut vs No. 1 Long Island	7−8		
7	3:02 pm	No. 3 Central Connecticut vs No. 1 Long Island	6−5	Long Island eliminated	

== All–Tournament Team ==
Player	Team
**Wyatt Cameron**	Central Connecticut
Vincent Borghese	Central Connecticut
Antonio Ducatelli	Central Connecticut
Kyle Gordon	Central Connecticut
Nicholas Finarelli	Long Island
Ryan Rivera	Long Island
Garrett Yawn	Long Island
Lukas Torres	Wagner
Jack Thorbahn	Stonehill

MVP in bold
