= 1994 Northeast Conference baseball tournament =

Baseball tournament, New Jersey, U.S.

- Teams: 4
- Format: Double-elimination tournament
- Finals site: Moody Park; Ewing Township, NJ
- Champions: Rider (1st title)
- Winning coach: Sonny Pittaro (1st title)
- MVP: Mark Gola (Rider)

1994 Northeast Conference baseball standings
	Conf.						Overall
Team	W		L		T	PCT	W		L		T	PCT
Fairleigh Dickinson ‍†‍‍	15	–	6	–	0	.714	26	–	16	–	0	.619
Rider ‍†‍‡‍^{y}	15	–	6	–	0	.714	33	–	18	–	2	.642
Long Island ‍‍‍	14	–	7	–	0	.667	25	–	19	–	0	.568
Wagner ‍‍‍	11	–	10	–	0	.524	19	–	22	–	0	.463
St. Francis ‍‍‍	10	–	11	–	0	.476	17	–	21	–	0	.447
Monmouth ‍‍‍	7	–	13	–	0	.350	13	–	23	–	0	.361
Mount St. Mary's ‍‍‍	6	–	15	–	0	.286	11	–	27	–	0	.289
Marist ‍‍‍	5	–	15	–	0	.250	10	–	29	–	0	.256
† – Conference champion ‡ – Tournament champion y – Invited to the NCAA tournament Rankings from Collegiate Baseball

The 1994 Northeast Conference baseball tournament was held in May 1994 at Moody Park in Ewing Township, New Jersey. The league's top four teams competed in the double elimination tournament. Top-seeded Rider won their first of three consecutive tournament championships. They then won a play-in series against Yale for the right to play in the 1994 NCAA Division I baseball tournament.

== Seeding and format ==
The top four finishers were seeded one through four based on conference regular-season winning percentage. They played a double-elimination tournament.

Team	W	L	Pct	GB	Seed
Rider	15	6	.714	—	1
Fairleigh Dickinson	15	6	.714	—	2
Long Island	14	7	.667	1	3
Wagner	11	10	.524	4	4
St. Francis	10	11	.476	5	—
Monmouth	7	13	.350	7.5	—
Mount St. Mary's	6	15	.286	9	—
Marist	5	15	.250	9.5	—

== Bracket ==
First round
1	Rider	9
4	Wagner	7
3	Long Island	1
2	Fairleigh Dickinson	4
Lower round 1
4	Wagner	1
3	Long Island	2

Semi-finals
1	Rider	6
2	Fairleigh Dickinson	2
Lower final
2	Fairleigh Dickinson	1
3	Long Island	4

Finals
1	Rider	7
3	Long Island	4

== Most Valuable Player ==
Mark Gola of Rider was named Tournament Most Valuable Player.
