= Scott Thomson (baseball) =

American baseball coach (born 1968)

Biographical details
- Born: November 12, 1968 (age 57)

Playing career
- 1988–1991: Old Dominion
- 1991: Erie Sailors
- Position: Outfielder

Coaching career (HC unless noted)
- 1992–1997: Western Maryland (assistant)
- 1998–2020: Mount St. Mary's

Head coaching record
- Overall: 373–690
- Tournaments: NCAA: 0–2

Accomplishments and honors

Championships
- NEC Regular season (2007); NEC Tournament (2008)

Awards
- NEC Coach of the Year (2007)

Scott S. Thomson (born November 12, 1968) is an American baseball coach. He played college baseball at Old Dominion, earning Virginia College Baseball Player of the Year as a senior in addition to numerous other awards. He played professionally for two seasons with the Erie Sailors before turning to coaching. He then served as the head baseball coach of the Mount St. Mary's Mountaineers (1998–2020).

== Head coaching record ==
Record table
Season	Team	Overall	Conference	Standing	Postseason
Mount St. Mary's Mountaineers (Northeast Conference) (1998–2020)
1998	Mount St. Mary's	9–28	6–9	T-4th	NEC tournament
1999	Mount St. Mary's	12–31	5–14	4th (South)	
2000	Mount St. Mary's	17–34	5–17	5th (South)	
2001	Mount St. Mary's	12–37	3–19	5th (South)	
2002	Mount St. Mary's	17–35	10–16	6th	
2003	Mount St. Mary's	14–23	9–14	8th	
2004	Mount St. Mary's	25–18	10–13	6th	
2005	Mount St. Mary's	18–27	12–11	5th	
2006	Mount St. Mary's	23–24	12–11	6th	
2007	Mount St. Mary's	35–22	21–7	T-1st	NEC Tournament
2008	Mount St. Mary's	21–34	13–11	4th	NCAA Regional
2009	Mount St. Mary's	23–25	15–11	T-4th	
2010	Mount St. Mary's	20–31	14–18	6th	
2011	Mount St. Mary's	16–35	7–25	9th	
2012	Mount St. Mary's	14–40	7–25	9th	
2013	Mount St. Mary's	11–37	6–26	9th	
2014	Mount St. Mary's	17–24	10–14	6th	
2015	Mount St. Mary's	12–31	10–14	T-5th	
2016	Mount St. Mary's	11–37	8–24	7th	
2017	Mount St. Mary's	8–39	5–23	7th	
2018	Mount St. Mary's	21–33	15–13	4th	NEC tournament
2019	Mount St. Mary's	15–35	8–16	7th	
2020	Mount St. Mary's	2–10	0–0		Season canceled due to COVID-19
Mount St. Mary's:		373–690	211–351		
Total:		373–690			
National champion Postseason invitational champion Conference regular season champion Conference regular season and conference tournament champion Division regular season champion Division regular season and conference tournament champion Conference tournament champion
