= 1993 Northeast Conference baseball tournament =

Baseball tournament, New Jersey, U.S.

- Teams: 4
- Format: Double-elimination tournament
- Finals site: Moody Park; Ewing Township, NJ
- Champions: St. Francis (1st title)
- Winning coach: Frank Del George (1st title)
- MVP: John Gambale (St. Francis)

1993 Northeast Conference baseball standings
	Conf.						Overall
Team	W		L		T	PCT	W		L		T	PCT
Fairleigh Dickinson ‍†‍‍	15	–	6	–	0	.714	28	–	16	–	0	.636
Long Island ‍‍‍	14	–	6	–	0	.700	17	–	18	–	0	.486
St. Francis ‍‍‡‍	13	–	8	–	0	.619	25	–	15	–	0	.625
Monmouth ‍‍‍	13	–	8	–	0	.619	17	–	20	–	0	.459
Rider ‍‍‍	12	–	9	–	0	.571	21	–	18	–	0	.538
Wagner ‍‍‍	6	–	14	–	0	.300	9	–	23	–	0	.281
Marist ‍‍‍	5	–	13	–	0	.278	9	–	24	–	1	.279
Mount St. Mary's ‍‍‍	1	–	15	–	0	.063	6	–	24	–	0	.200
† – Conference champion ‡ – Tournament champion y – Invited to the NCAA tournament Rankings from Collegiate Baseball

The 1993 Northeast Conference baseball tournament was held in May 1993 at Moody Park in Ewing Township, New Jersey. The league's top four teams competed in the double elimination tournament. Third-seeded St. Francis won their first and only tournament championship.

== Seeding and format ==
The top four finishers were seeded one through four based on conference regular-season winning percentage. They played a double-elimination tournament.

Team	W	L	Pct	GB	Seed
Fairleigh Dickinson	15	6	.714	—	1
Long Island	14	6	.600	.5	2
St. Francis	13	8	.619	2	3
Monmouth	13	8	.619	2	4
Rider	12	9	.571	3	—
Wagner	6	14	.300	8.5	—
Marist	5	13	.278	8.5	—
Mount St. Mary's	1	15	.063	12	—

== Bracket ==
First round
1	Fairleigh Dickinson	7
4	Monmouth	11
3	St. Francis	13
2	Long Island	2
Lower round 1
1	Fairleigh Dickinson	5
2	Long Island	0

Semi-finals
4	Monmouth	0
3	St. Francis	5
Lower final
4	Monmouth	0
1	Fairleigh Dickinson	9

Finals
3	St. Francis	8	—
1	Fairleigh Dickinson	6	—

== Most Valuable Player ==
John Gambale of St. Francis was named Tournament Most Valuable Player.
