= 2018 Northeast Conference baseball tournament =

- Teams: 4
- Format: Double-elimination tournament
- Finals site: Senator Thomas J. Dodd Memorial Stadium; Norwich, CT
- Champions: LIU Brooklyn (1st title)
- Winning coach: Dan Pirillo (1st title)
- MVP: Gregory Vaughn (LIU Brooklyn)

2018 Northeast Conference baseball standings
| | Conf. | | | | | | Overall |
| Team | W | | L | | T | PCT | W | | L | | T | PCT |
|---|---|---|---|---|---|---|---|---|---|---|---|---|
| Bryant ‍†‍‍ | 21 | – | 7 | – | 0 | .750 | 32 | – | 23 | – | 1 | .580 |
| Wagner ‍†‍‍ | 21 | – | 7 | – | 0 | .750 | 38 | – | 18 | – | 0 | .679 |
| LIU Brooklyn ‍‍‡‍^{y} | 16 | – | 12 | – | 0 | .571 | 31 | – | 26 | – | 0 | .544 |
| Mount St. Mary's ‍‍‍ | 15 | – | 13 | – | 0 | .536 | 21 | – | 33 | – | 0 | .389 |
| Sacred Heart ‍‍‍ | 12 | – | 16 | – | 0 | .429 | 17 | – | 35 | – | 0 | .327 |
| Central Connecticut ‍‍‍ | 11 | – | 16 | – | 0 | .407 | 18 | – | 28 | – | 0 | .391 |
| Fairleigh Dickinson ‍‍‍ | 1 | – | 26 | – | 0 | .037 | 10 | – | 37 | – | 0 | .213 |
† – Conference champion ‡ – Tournament champion y – Invited to the NCAA tournament Rankings from Collegiate Baseball

The 2018 Northeast Conference baseball tournament began on May 24 and ended on May 27 at Senator Thomas J. Dodd Memorial Stadium in Norwich, Connecticut. The league's top four teams finishers competed in the double elimination tournament. LIU Brooklyn won their first tournament championship and earned the Northeast Conference's automatic bid to the 2018 NCAA Division I baseball tournament.

Entering the event, Central Connecticut had won the most tournament championships among current members, while Fairleigh Dickinson and LIU Brooklyn had never won a championship.

== Seeding and format ==
The top four finishers were seeded one through four based on conference regular season winning percentage. They then played a double-elimination tournament.

| Team | W | L | Pct | GB | Seed |
|---|---|---|---|---|---|
| Bryant | 21 | 7 | .750 | — | 1 |
| Wagner | 21 | 7 | .750 | — | 2 |
| LIU Brooklyn | 16 | 12 | .571 | 5 | 3 |
| Mount St Mary's | 15 | 13 | .536 | 6 | 4 |
| Sacred Heart | 12 | 16 | .429 | 9 | — |
| Central Connecticut | 11 | 16 | .407 | 9.5 | — |
| Fairleigh Dickinson | 1 | 26 | .037 | 19.5 | — |

== Bracket ==
First round
1 | Bryant | 21
4 | Mount St Mary's | 6
2 | Wagner | 1
3 | LIU Brooklyn | 2
Lower round 1
4 | Mount St. Mary's | 1
2 | Wagner | 3

Semi-finals
1 | Bryant | 4
3 | LIU Brooklyn | 13
Lower final
2 | Wagner | 6
1 | Bryant | 1

Finals
3 | LIU Brooklyn | 8
2 | Wagner | 5

== All-Tournament Team ==
The following players were named to the All-Tournament Team.

| Name | Team |
|---|---|
| Neil Abbatiello | Wagner |
| James Ciliento | Bryant |
| Patrick Clyne | LIU Brooklyn |
| Rob Griswold | LIU Brooklyn |
| Eric Ligda | Wagner |
| Joe Mercadante | LIU Brooklyn |
| Andrew Turner | LIU Brooklyn |
| Gregory Vaughn Jr. | LIU Brooklyn |
| Ryan Ward | Bryant |

=== Most Valuable Player ===
Gregory Vaughn Jr. earned the Tournament Most Valuable Player award. Vaughn was a junior outfielder for LIU Brooklyn, who recorded 5 RBI and 3 stolen bases in the Tournament.
