= 2013 Northeast Conference baseball tournament =

Baseball tournament, New Jersey, U.S.

- Teams: 4
- Format: Double-elimination tournament
- Finals site: FirstEnergy Park; Lakewood, NJ
- Champions: Bryant (1st title)
- Winning coach: Steve Owens (1st title)
- MVP: Jordan Mountford (Bryant)

2013 Northeast Conference baseball standings
| | Conf. | | | | | | Overall |
| Team | W | | L | | T | PCT | W | | L | | T | PCT |
|---|---|---|---|---|---|---|---|---|---|---|---|---|
| Bryant ‍†‍‡‍^{y} | 27 | – | 5 | – | 0 | .844 | 45 | – | 17 | – | 1 | .722 |
| Sacred Heart ‍‍‍ | 23 | – | 9 | – | 0 | .719 | 34 | – | 23 | – | 0 | .596 |
| Monmouth ‍‍‍ | 19 | – | 11 | – | 1 | .629 | 30 | – | 24 | – | 1 | .555 |
| Long Island ‍‍‍ | 16 | – | 14 | – | 1 | .532 | 21 | – | 33 | – | 1 | .391 |
| Central Connecticut ‍‍‍ | 16 | – | 16 | – | 0 | .500 | 28 | – | 25 | – | 0 | .528 |
| Wagner ‍‍‍ | 16 | – | 16 | – | 0 | .500 | 24 | – | 31 | – | 0 | .436 |
| Quinnipiac ‍‍‍ | 12 | – | 20 | – | 0 | .375 | 17 | – | 36 | – | 0 | .321 |
| Fairleigh Dickinson ‍‍‍ | 7 | – | 25 | – | 0 | .219 | 12 | – | 36 | – | 0 | .250 |
| Mount St. Mary's ‍‍‍ | 6 | – | 26 | – | 0 | .188 | 11 | – | 37 | – | 0 | .229 |
† – Conference champion ‡ – Tournament champion y – Invited to the NCAA tournament Rankings from Collegiate Baseball

The 2013 Northeast Conference baseball tournament began on May 24 and ended on May 26 at FirstEnergy Park in Lakewood, New Jersey. The league's top four teams finishers competed in the double elimination tournament. Top seeded Bryant won its first Tournament championship and claimed the Northeast Conference's automatic bid to the 2013 NCAA Division I baseball tournament.

== Seeding and format ==
The top four finishers were seeded one through four based on conference regular season winning percentage. They then played a double-elimination tournament.

| Team | W | L | T | Pct. | GB | Seed |
|---|---|---|---|---|---|---|
| Bryant | 27 | 5 | 0 | .844 | – | 1 |
| Sacred Heart | 23 | 9 | 0 | .719 | 4 | 2 |
| Monmouth | 19 | 11 | 1 | .629 | 7.5 | 3 |
| Long Island | 16 | 14 | 1 | .532 | 10.5 | 4 |
| Central Connecticut | 16 | 16 | 0 | .500 | 11 | – |
| Wagner | 16 | 16 | 0 | .500 | 11 | – |
| Quinnipiac | 12 | 20 | 0 | .375 | 15 | – |
| Fairleigh Dickinson | 7 | 25 | 0 | .219 | 20 | – |
| Mount St. Mary's | 6 | 26 | 0 | .188 | 21 | – |

== Bracket ==
First round
1 | Bryant | 2
4 | Long Island | 7
2 | Sacred Heart | 7
3 | Monmouth | 1
Lower round 1
1 | Bryant | 11
3 | Monmouth | 1

Semi-finals
4 | Long Island | 7
2 | Sacred Heart | 8
Lower final
4 | Long Island | 1
1 | Bryant | 16

Finals
2 | Sacred Heart | 3 | 0
1 | Bryant | 6 | 8

== All-Tournament Team ==
The following players were named to the All-Tournament Team.

| Name | School | Pos |
|---|---|---|
| Jordan Mountford | Bryant | OF |
| Kevin Brown | Bryant | 3B |
| John Healy | Bryant | RHP |
| Kevin McAvoy | Bryant | RHP |
| Carl Anderson | Bryant | OF |
| Troy Scribner | Sacred Heart | RHP |
| Dan Perez | Sacred Heart | DH |
| Justin Topa | Long Island | RHP |
| John Ziznewski | Long Island | SS |

=== Most Valuable Player ===
Jordan Mountford was named Tournament Most Valuable Player. Mountford was a sophomore outfielder for Bryant.
