= 1996 Northeast Conference baseball tournament =

Baseball tournament, New Jersey, U.S.

- Teams: 4
- Format: Double-elimination tournament
- Finals site: Moody Park; Ewing Township, NJ
- Champions: Rider (3rd title)
- Winning coach: Sonny Pittaro (3rd title)
- MVP: Jim Gordon (Rider)

1996 Northeast Conference baseball standings
	Conf.						Overall
Team	W		L		T	PCT	W		L		T	PCT
Rider ‍†‍‡‍	15	–	6	–	0	.714	28	–	22	–	0	.560
Monmouth ‍†‍‍	15	–	6	–	0	.714	25	–	22	–	0	.532
St. Francis ‍‍‍	12	–	8	–	0	.600	21	–	20	–	1	.512
Long Island ‍‍‍	12	–	9	–	0	.571	21	–	19	–	0	.525
Fairleigh Dickinson ‍‍‍	9	–	12	–	0	.429	16	–	23	–	0	.410
Wagner ‍‍‍	8	–	12	–	0	.400	14	–	24	–	0	.368
Marist ‍‍‍	8	–	13	–	0	.381	16	–	24	–	1	.402
Mount St. Mary's ‍‍‍	4	–	17	–	0	.190	6	–	24	–	1	.210
† – Conference champion ‡ – Tournament champion y – Invited to the NCAA tournament Rankings from Collegiate Baseball

The 1996 Northeast Conference baseball tournament was held in May 1996 at Moody Park in Ewing Township, New Jersey. The league's top four teams competed in the double elimination tournament. Top-seeded Rider won their third consecutive, and final, tournament championship. They then lost a play-in series to Princeton for the right to play in the 1996 NCAA Division I baseball tournament.

== Seeding and format ==
The top four finishers were seeded one through four based on conference regular-season winning percentage. They played a double-elimination tournament.

Team	W	L	Pct	GB	Seed
Rider	15	6	.714	—	1
Monmouth	15	6	.714	—	2
St. Francis	12	8	.600	2.5	3
Long Island	12	9	.571	3	4
Fairleigh Dickinson	9	12	.429	6	—
Wagner	8	12	.400	6.5	—
Marist	8	13	.381	7	—
Mount St. Mary's	4	17	.190	11	—

== Bracket ==
First round
1	Rider	3
4	Long Island	2
3	St. Francis	5
2	Monmouth	2
Lower round 1
4	Long Island	2
2	Monmouth	1

Semi-finals
1	Rider	1
3	St. Francis	0
Lower final
3	St. Francis	4
4	Long Island	9

Finals
1	Rider	14
4	Long Island	1

== Most Valuable Player ==
Jim Gordon of Rider was named Tournament Most Valuable Player.
