= 2014 Northeast Conference baseball tournament =

Baseball tournament, Connecticut, U.S.

- Teams: 4
- Format: Double-elimination tournament
- Finals site: Senator Thomas J. Dodd Memorial Stadium; Norwich, CT
- Champions: Bryant (2nd title)
- Winning coach: Steve Owens (2nd title)
- MVP: Craig Schlitter (Bryant)

2014 Northeast Conference baseball standings
	Conf.						Overall
Team	W		L		T	PCT	W		L		T	PCT
Bryant ‍†‍‡‍^{y}	19	–	5	–	0	.792	42	–	16	–	0	.724
Central Connecticut ‍‍‍	14	–	10	–	0	.583	27	–	22	–	0	.551
Sacred Heart ‍‍‍	13	–	11	–	0	.542	29	–	28	–	0	.509
LIU Brooklyn ‍‍‍	11	–	13	–	0	.458	25	–	25	–	1	.500
Wagner ‍‍‍	11	–	13	–	0	.458	19	–	35	–	0	.352
Mount St. Mary's ‍‍‍	10	–	14	–	0	.417	17	–	24	–	0	.415
Fairleigh Dickinson ‍‍‍	6	–	18	–	0	.250	15	–	32	–	0	.319
† – Conference champion ‡ – Tournament champion y – Invited to the NCAA tournament Rankings from Collegiate Baseball

The 2014 Northeast Conference baseball tournament began on May 22 and ended on May 25, 2014, at Dodd Stadium in Norwich, Connecticut. The league's top four finishers competed in the double elimination tournament. Bryant won the tournament for the second time, earning the NEC's automatic bid to the 2014 NCAA Division I baseball tournament.

== Seeding and format ==
The top four finishers were seeded one through four based on conference regular-season winning percentage. They then played a double-elimination tournament.

Team	W	L	Pct	GB	Seed
Bryant	19	5	.792	–	1
Central Connecticut	14	10	.583	5	2
Sacred Heart	13	11	.542	6	3
Wagner	11	13	.458	8	4
LIU Brooklyn	11	13	.458	8	–
Mount St. Mary's	10	14	.417	9	–
Fairleigh Dickinson	6	18	.250	13	–

== Bracket ==
First round
1	Bryant	5
4	Wagner	2
2	Central Connecticut	4
3	Sacred Heart	3
Lower round 1
4	Wagner	8
3	Sacred Heart	13

Semi-finals
1	Bryant	3
2	Central Connecticut	0
Lower final
3	Sacred Heart	2
2	Central Connecticut	0

Finals
1	Bryant	6
3	Sacred Heart	2

== All-Tournament Team ==
The following players were named to the All-Tournament Team. Bryant pitcher Craig Schlitter, one of four Bulldogs selected, was named Most Valuable Player.

Pos.	Name	Team
P	Craig Schlitter	Bryant
P	Kevin McAvoy	Bryant
1B	Robby Rinn	Bryant
C/DH	Buck McCarthy	Bryant
UT	Keith Klebart	Sacred Heart
OF	Jayson Sullivan	Sacred Heart
P	Nick Morrissey	Sacred Heart
P	Nick Neumann	Central Connecticut
OF	Trey Nicosia	Wagner
