= 2016 Northeast Conference baseball tournament =

- Teams: 4
- Format: Double-elimination tournament
- Finals site: Senator Thomas J. Dodd Memorial Stadium; Norwich, CT
- Champions: Bryant (3rd title)
- Winning coach: Steve Owens (3rd title)
- MVP: Cole Fabio, (Bryant)

2016 Northeast Conference baseball standings
	Conf.				Overall
Team	W		L	PCT	W		L	PCT
Bryant ‍†‍‡‍^{y}	26	–	4	.867	47	–	12	.797
Sacred Heart ‍‍‍	18	–	13	.581	30	–	28	.517
Fairleigh Dickinson ‍‍‍	16	–	15	.516	28	–	28	.500
Central Connecticut ‍‍‍	15	–	17	.469	23	–	34	.404
LIU Brooklyn ‍‍‍	13	–	17	.433	19	–	35	.352
Wagner ‍‍‍	13	–	19	.406	19	–	33	.365
Mount St. Mary's ‍‍‍	8	–	24	.250	11	–	37	.229
† – Conference champion ‡ – Tournament champion y – Invited to the NCAA tournament As of June 11, 2016; Rankings from Collegiate Baseball

The 2016 Northeast Conference baseball tournament began on May 26 and ended on May 28 at Senator Thomas J. Dodd Memorial Stadium in Norwich, Connecticut. The league's top four teams finishers competed in the double elimination tournament. Bryant won their third tournament championship in four years to earn the Northeast Conference's automatic bid to the 2016 NCAA Division I baseball tournament.

Entering the event, Central Connecticut and defending champion Sacred Heart had won the most tournament championships among current members, while Fairleigh Dickinson and LIU Brooklyn had never won a championship.

== Seeding and format ==
The top four finishers were seeded one through four based on conference regular season winning percentage. They will then play a double-elimination tournament.

Team	W	L	Pct	GB	Seed
Bryant	26	4	.867	—	1
Sacred Heart	18	13	.581	8.5	2
Fairleigh Dickinson	16	15	.516	10.5	3
Central Connecticut	15	17	.469	12	4
LIU Brooklyn	13	17	.433	13	—
Wagner	13	19	.406	14	—
Mount St. Mary's	8	24	.250	19	—

== Bracket ==
First round
1	Bryant	8
4	Central Connecticut	1
3	Fairleigh Dickinson	8
2	Sacred Heart	9
Lower round 1
4	Central Connecticut	0
3	Fairleigh Dickinson	2

Semi-finals
1	Bryant	5
2	Sacred Heart	1
Lower final
3	Fairleigh Dickinson	11
2	Sacred Heart	8

Finals
1	Bryant	8
3	Fairleigh Dickinson	3

== All-Tournament Team ==
The following players were named to the All-Tournament Team.

Name	School
Brandon Bingel	Bryant
Ryan Brennan	Fairleigh Dickinson
PJ DeFilippo	Sacred Heart
Cole Fabio	Bryant
Jason Fatzinger	Fairleigh Dickinson
Buck McCarthy	Bryant
Bobby Romano	Fairleigh Dickinson
AJ Zarozny	Bryant
Corey Zeller	Fairleigh Dickinson

=== Most Valuable Player ===
Cole Fabio was named Tournament Most Valuable Player. Fabio was a junior second baseman who recorded four hits, four walks, three RBI and a tournament-high seven runs scored in the event.
