= Nick Giaquinto =

American football player and college baseball coach (born 1955)

No. 35, 30
- Position: Running back

Personal information
- Born: April 4, 1955 (age 71); Bridgeport, Connecticut, U.S.
- Listed height: 5 ft 11 in (1.80 m)
- Listed weight: 205 lb (93 kg)

Career information
- High school: Stratford (Stratford, Connecticut)
- College: Bridgeport; Connecticut
- NFL draft: 1977: undrafted

Career history
- New York Giants (1977)*; Miami Dolphins (1980–1981); Washington Redskins (1981-1983)
- * Offseason or practice squad member only

Awards and highlights
- Super Bowl champion (XVII)

Career NFL statistics
- Rushing yards: 178
- Rushing average: 4.5
- Receptions: 65
- Receiving yards: 722
- Touchdowns: 5
- Stats at Pro Football Reference

Nicholas Albert Giaquinto (born April 4, 1955) is an American former professional football player who was a running back in the National Football League (NFL) for the Miami Dolphins and Washington Redskins, where head coach Joe Gibbs nicknamed him "the Trashman" for his ability to fill many roles on the team. During the 1983 season, Giaquinto played as the first H-Back in NFL history. He played in the 1982 and 1983 Super Bowls with the Redskins and retired after the 1983 season, ending his four-year NFL career. He played college football for the Bridgeport Purple Knights and Connecticut Huskies. He holds the single-game rushing record at UConn of 277 yards, set in a 1976 game against Holy Cross. He attended Stratford High School in Stratford, Connecticut where he was an All-State and National High School All American selection in football.

Giaquinto was the head baseball coach at Sacred Heart University in Connecticut, a position he held since prior to the 1989 season. He retired after the 2017 season, the last season for Sacred Heart at the Ballpark at Harbor Yard.

== Head coaching records ==
The following is a list of Giaquinto's yearly records as an NCAA Division I head baseball coach. Although Giaquinto has coached Sacred Heart since the start of the 1989 season, Sacred Heart did not join Division I until the start of the 2000 season.

Record table
Season	Team	Overall	Conference	Standing	Postseason
Sacred Heart (New England Collegiate Conference) (1989–1999)
1989	Sacred Heart	16-17	9-5		
1990	Sacred Heart	30-15	11-3		NCAA Regional
1991	Sacred Heart	26-12	11-3	2nd	NCAA Regional
1992	Sacred Heart	27-9	12-2		College World Series
1993	Sacred Heart	25-12	9-5		
1994	Sacred Heart	18-14	10-4		
1995	Sacred Heart	15-27	8-13		
1996	Sacred Heart	19-18	9-9		
1997	Sacred Heart	15-25-1	7-10-1		
1998	Sacred Heart	6-27	2-12		
1999	Sacred Heart	17-31	8-10		
Sacred Heart (Northeast Conference) (2000–2017)
2000	Sacred Heart	12–38	6–16	5th (North)	
2001	Sacred Heart	22–23	12–10	4th (North)	
2002	Sacred Heart	20–27	14–13	5th	
2003	Sacred Heart	13–29	7–17	10th	
2004	Sacred Heart	12–36	10–14	7th	
2005	Sacred Heart	20–33	16–8	2nd	NEC Tournament
2006	Sacred Heart	26–30	14–9	t-4th	NCAA Regional
2007	Sacred Heart	22–31	12–15	5th	
2008	Sacred Heart	12–41	10–18	6th	
2009	Sacred Heart	29–27–1	16–10	2nd	NEC Tournament
2010	Sacred Heart	31–27	20–12	2nd	NEC Tournament
2011	Sacred Heart	34–23	23–9	2nd	NCAA Regional
2012	Sacred Heart	25–32	19–13	4th	NCAA Regional
2013	Sacred Heart	34–24	23–9	2nd	NEC tournament
2014	Sacred Heart	29–28	13–11	3rd	NEC tournament
2015	Sacred Heart	23–32–1	13–11	3rd	NCAA Regional
2016	Sacred Heart	30–28	18–13	2nd	NEC tournament
2017	Sacred Heart	23–36	14–13	4th	NEC tournament
Sacred Heart:		631–752–1	356–297		
Total:		631–752–1			
National champion Postseason invitational champion Conference regular season champion Conference regular season and conference tournament champion Division regular season champion Division regular season and conference tournament champion Conference tournament champion
