= Charlie Hickey (coach) =

American college baseball coach (born 1964)

Biographical details
- Born: September 24, 1964 (age 62); Middletown, Connecticut, U.S.
- Education: University of Connecticut '87

Coaching career (HC unless noted)
- 1992–1996: Providence (asst.)
- 1997–1999: Providence
- 2000–present: Central Connecticut

Head coaching record
- Overall: 818–669–5
- Tournaments: NCAA: 4–20

Accomplishments and honors

Championships
- 9× NEC tournament (2002–2004, 2010, 2017, 2019, 2021, 2023, 2025); 4× NEC regular season (2003, 2004, 2006, 2023); NEC North: 2001; Big East tournament (1999)

Awards
- ABCA Northeast Co-Coach of the Year: 2004; 5× NEC Coach of the Year (2001, 2003, 2006, 2023, 2025); Big East Coach of the Year: 1999

Charlie Hickey (born September 24, 1964) is an American college baseball coach. He was the head coach of Central Connecticut from the 2000 season until 2026, leading the Blue Devils to six NCAA tournaments. Previously, he was the head coach at Providence for three seasons (1997–1999). Providence announced it was cutting the program prior to the 1999 season, but the team won that year's Big East title and advanced to an NCAA Regional final.

== Coaching career ==
=== Collegiate summer baseball ===
Before becoming an NCAA head coach, Hickey was an assistant with the Cotuit Kettleers of the Cape Cod Baseball League from 1992 to 1994, and head coach of the New England Collegiate Baseball League's Eastern Tides in 1996.

=== Providence ===
Hickey began his coaching career as an assistant at Providence in the 1992 season. He held the position for five years, then became head coach when Paul Kostacopoulos left to become the head coach at Maine following the 1996 season.

Hickey coached Providence for three seasons (1997–1999). In 1997, the Friars missed the Big East Tournament. In 1998, the team won 31 games and earned a Big East tournament berth. There, it lost its opening game to St. John's, then defeated Rutgers and West Virginia before being eliminated by Notre Dame.

In October 1998, Providence announced it would cut its baseball program following the 1999 season, due to Title IX's gender equity requirements. During that season, Providence finished third in the Big East and went 49–16 to set a New England record for wins. It also swept the conference's major awards, with Hickey named Coach of the Year. At the Big East tournament, the Friars started off 1–1, defeating fourth-seeded Seton Hall in the opening game, then losing to second-seeded Rutgers. It then won three consecutive games (over Notre Dame, Rutgers, and St. John's) to win the tournament and receive the Big East's automatic bid to the NCAA tournament. As a two-seed at the Tallahassee Regional, the Friars lost their opener to Jacksonville, 7–5. They staved off elimination with a 12–1 win over The Citadel. In the 1–1 game (a rematch against Jacksonville), Providence fell behind 7–1, but rallied to win 9–8 in a game that saw a bench-clearing brawl and support from Florida State's fans. In the regional championship, Florida State defeated the Friars, 14–3, in the program's final game. The team's season was the subject of a book by Paul Lonardo and received national attention in the debate over Title IX.

=== Central Connecticut ===
Hickey was offered the head coaching position at Central Connecticut (which he accepted) by retiring CCSU coach George Redman. Under Hickey, CCSU had a great deal of success in the early 2000s. The Blue Devils qualified for the NCAA tournament in 2002, 2003, and 2004, also winning NEC regular season titles in 2001 and 2006. Hickey was named NEC Coach of the Year in 2001, 2003, and 2006. Since 2006, CCSU has not won an NEC regular season title, but the Blue Devils won the NEC Tournament in 2010 to reach their fourth NCAA tournament under Hickey.

In 2012, Hickey surpassed Hank Majlinger to become Central Connecticut's winningest coach. In 2013, he won his 500th career game. In 2014, multiple Blue Devils were selected in the Major League Baseball draft for the first time in his tenure at CCSU– pitcher Nick Neumann was taken by the Pirates, and outfielder J.P. Sportman was taken by the Athletics.

== Head coaching record ==
Below is a table of Hickey's yearly records as a collegiate head baseball coach.

Record table
Season	Team	Overall	Conference	Standing	Postseason
Providence (Big East Conference) (1997–1999)
1997	Providence	26–23	10–15	4th (American)	
1998	Providence	31–22	14–8	4th	Big East tournament
1999	Providence	49–16	18–8	3rd	NCAA Regional
Providence:		106–61	42–31		
Central Connecticut (Northeast Conference) (2000–2026)
2000	Central Connecticut	17–31–1	9–11	3rd (North)	
2001	Central Connecticut	30–22	14–8	T-1st (North)	NEC Tournament
2002	Central Connecticut	34–23	18–9	3rd	NCAA Regional
2003	Central Connecticut	31–17–2	19–6	1st	NCAA Regional
2004	Central Connecticut	41–17–1	20–4	1st	NCAA Regional
2005	Central Connecticut	19–28	10–14	7th	
2006	Central Connecticut	33–18	16–7	1st	NEC Tournament
2007	Central Connecticut	26–26	14–14	4th	NEC Tournament
2008	Central Connecticut	25–24	18–9	2nd	NEC Tournament
2009	Central Connecticut	26–22	16–11	3rd	NEC Tournament
2010	Central Connecticut	33–23	18–14	3rd	NCAA Regional
2011	Central Connecticut	26–25–1	17–14	5th	NEC Tournament
2012	Central Connecticut	28–24	19–13	T-3rd	NEC Tournament
2013	Central Connecticut	28–25	16–16	T-5th	
2014	Central Connecticut	27–22	14–10	2nd	NEC tournament
2015	Central Connecticut	17–31	9–15	6th	
2016	Central Connecticut	23–34	15–17	4th	NEC tournament
2017	Central Connecticut	36–22	21–7	2nd	NCAA Regional
2018	Central Connecticut	18–28	12–16	6th	
2019	Central Connecticut	31–23	16–8	2nd	NCAA Regional
2020	Central Connecticut	4–8	0–0		Season canceled due to COVID-19
2021	Central Connecticut	28–15	21–9	2nd	NCAA Regional
2022	Central Connecticut	29–18	17–10	3rd	NEC tournament
2023	Central Connecticut	36–14	25–5	1st	NCAA Regional
2024	Central Connecticut	18–24	17–15	7th	
2025	Central Connecticut	31–17	23–7	T–2nd	NCAA Regional
2026	Central Connecticut	17–27	13–20	9th	
Central Connecticut:		712–608–5	427–289		
Total:		818–669–5			
National champion Postseason invitational champion Conference regular season champion Conference regular season and conference tournament champion Division regular season champion Division regular season and conference tournament champion Conference tournament champion

== See also ==
- Central Connecticut Blue Devils
