= New Britain Stadium =

Baseball stadium in New Britain, Connecticut

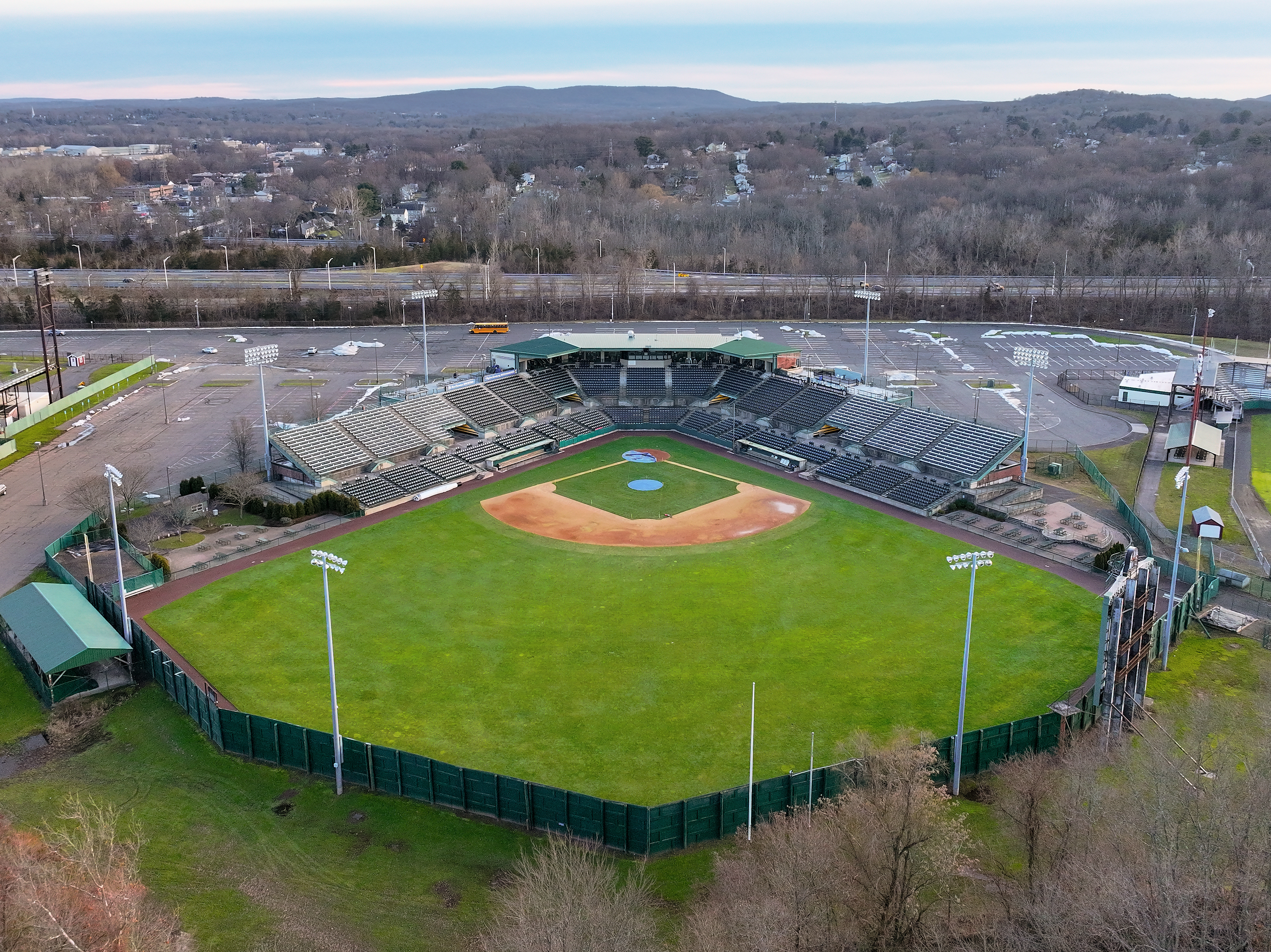

- Location within Connecticut Location within the United States
- Interactive map of New Britain Stadium
- Address: 230 John Karbonic Way; New Britain, Connecticut 06051
- Coordinates: 41°38′54.62″N 72°46′30.76″W
- Owner: City of New Britain
- Operator: Hard Hittin' Professional Baseball, LLC.
- Capacity: 6,146
- Surface: Grass
- Record attendance: 8,672
- Field size: Left field: 330 feet Center field: 400 feet Right field: 330 feet

Construction
- Groundbreaking: June 1, 1995
- Opened: April 12, 1996
- Cost: $10 million ($20.5 million in 2025 dollars)
- Architects: Kaestle Boos Associates; Highland Associates
- Project managers: Fred Brunoli & Sons, Inc.
- General contractor: Newfield Construction Co.

Tenants
- New Britain Bees (FCBL / ALPB) 2016–present New Britain Rock Cats (EL) 1996–2015

New Britain Stadium is a baseball venue in New Britain, Connecticut, United States. It is the home of the New Britain Bees of the Futures Collegiate Baseball League. Opened in 1996, the stadium seats 6,146 spectators.

The stadium is part of the city facility known as Willow Brook Park and is sometimes referred to by this name also. It is adjacent to Beehive Field, where the New Britain Red Sox played for 13 seasons after moving from Bristol in 1983. The park also contains Veteran's Memorial Stadium, a facility for football and soccer.

New Britain Stadium hosted the Eastern League All-Star Game on July 16, 2003, before a then-record crowd of 7,169 fans. On the last day of the 2004 season, it welcomed its two millionth visitor. The current all-time attendance record was set on August 28, 2015, when 8,672 fans watched the Rock Cats' last Friday home game.

== Features ==
The stadium is laid out with split-level seating. A concourse runs around the middle of the seating area, and fans walk down toward the field to reach the box seats, or continue upward to reach reserved seats and general admission seating. Fans reach the seating area through four tunnels, each with a set of stairs coming up from the main concourse below. This concourse is at ground level, underneath the upper seating areas; it contains concessions, restrooms, the gift shop, and access to team administrative offices. While fans cannot see the game in person from the concourse below, it does provide an enclosed dry refuge in case of a rain delay.

Skyboxes (the "suite level") are located at the top of the seating bowl, on either side of the press box. Access is by elevator from the main concourse two levels below.

At the top of the third-base seating area is a beer deck featuring beers rom New Britain Craft brewery Alvarium, and patio area which is open to all fans. Down the right-field line, the "Comcast Patio" is another area with grills, picnic tables, and a large tent, which can be rented for groups of 25 or more. Down the left-field line is a kids' play area with an inflatable slide, a moonbounce, a speed-pitching machine, and other activities.

Also located inside New Britain Stadium are plaques bearing the names of the New Britain Sports Hall of Fame. Including the 2020 class, there are 292 inductees representing the city's athletic history from 1850 to date.

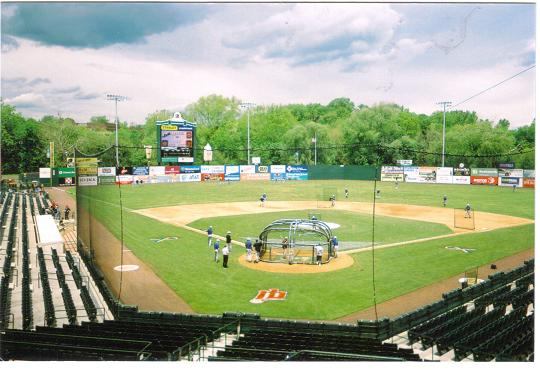

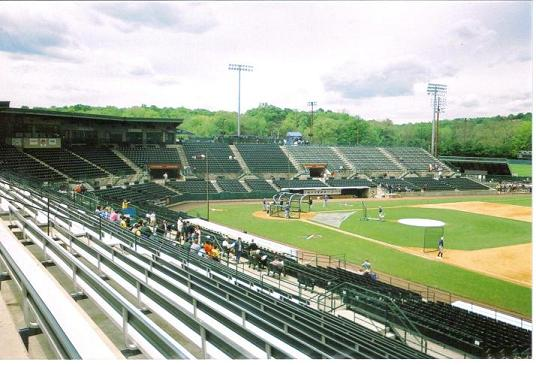
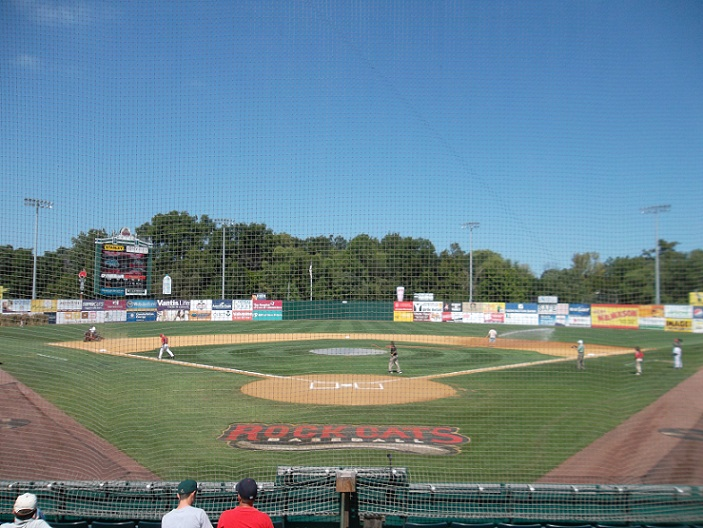
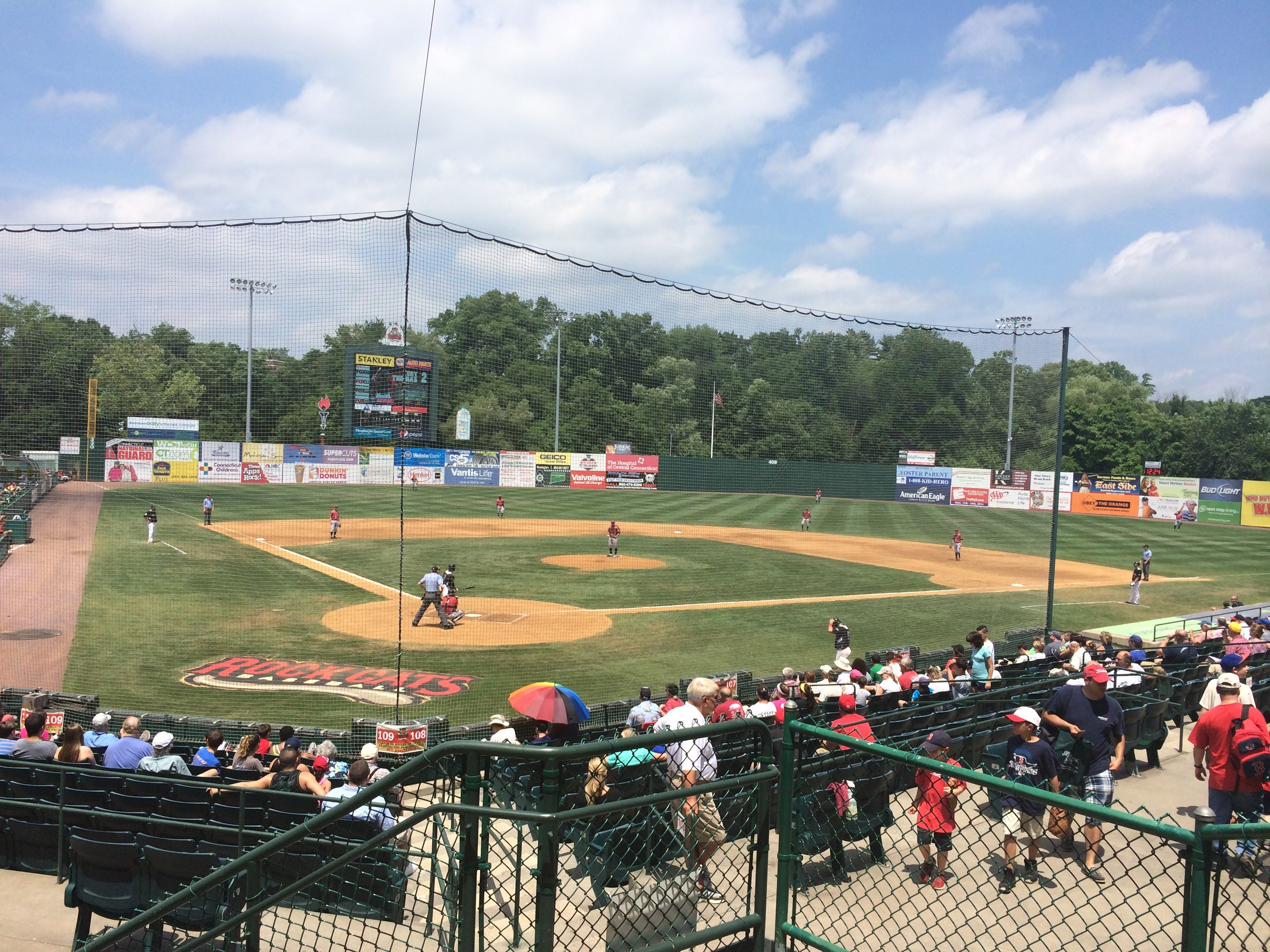

== History ==
The need for New Britain Stadium grew out of a new set of ballpark standards issued by the National Association of Professional Baseball Clubs in the early 1990s. Due to the growing popularity of minor league baseball, and the wide variety of facilities that were in use at the time, that governing body thought it best to establish consistency and minimum standards for such things as dugouts, locker rooms, press boxes, seating capacity, etc., across all the minor leagues. On a case-by-case basis, franchises were given certain time periods in which to achieve compliance.

At this time, the Rock Cats were still playing at Beehive Field, which—despite some recent improvements—still fell far short of meeting the league minimums. A big hangup was the seating capacity, which was about 2,000 shy of the new requirement of 6,000 to support a double-A franchise. The estimate was that bringing Beehive Field into compliance would have cost at least $2–3 million, and this was also at a time when other brand-new stadiums were being constructed around the Eastern League. Rock Cats owner Joe Buzas was also faced with pressure from the Boston Red Sox organization (which was the team's major-league affiliate at the time) to move the team closer to the heart of Red Sox Nation—preferably Springfield, Massachusetts. Eventually in August 1994, after receiving pledges of financial support from the City of New Britain, Connecticut governor Lowell Weicker, and New Britain's largest employer, Stanley Works, Buzas announced that he would keep the team in the city and begin construction of a new ballpark.

Groundbreaking occurred on June 1, 1995, and construction moved quickly while the Rock Cats played out their last season at Beehive Field located right next door. New Britain-based Kaestle-Boos, Inc., was selected as the architect, and the Brunoli Construction Company of Avon was chosen as general contractor. The new stadium was built from scratch in less than 11 months. Obstacles along the way included the need to move New Britain High School's baseball and softball fields (also located next door; those teams now use the still-standing Beehive Field); environmental issues including redirecting the flow of a nearby stream; and jurisdictional conflicts, since part of the stadium grounds is actually located in the town of Berlin. Nonetheless, a wildly successful Opening Day was held on April 12, 1996—successful except for the fact that the Rock Cats were shut out by the New Haven Ravens, 3–0. They got their first win the next day, returning the shutout over the Ravens, 7–0.

As an epilogue to the stadium negotiations, Red Sox general manager Dan Duquette announced in September 1994—less than a month after Buzas' decision to stay in New Britain—that the Red Sox were pulling their affiliation and moving to Trenton, New Jersey. The result was the Rock Cats' development agreement with the Minnesota Twins.

Buzas is honored with a plaque at New Britain Stadium, "in grateful appreciation for bringing minor league baseball to New Britain in 1983". Following the Rock Cats departure to Hartford after the 2015 season, the New Britain Bees began play at New Britain Stadium. The team played in the Atlantic League of Professional Baseball from 2016 to 2019 before the team became a collegiate summer baseball league team in the Futures Collegiate Baseball League following the 2019 season.
