= Surf Stadium =

Baseball stadium in Atlantic City, New Jersey, US

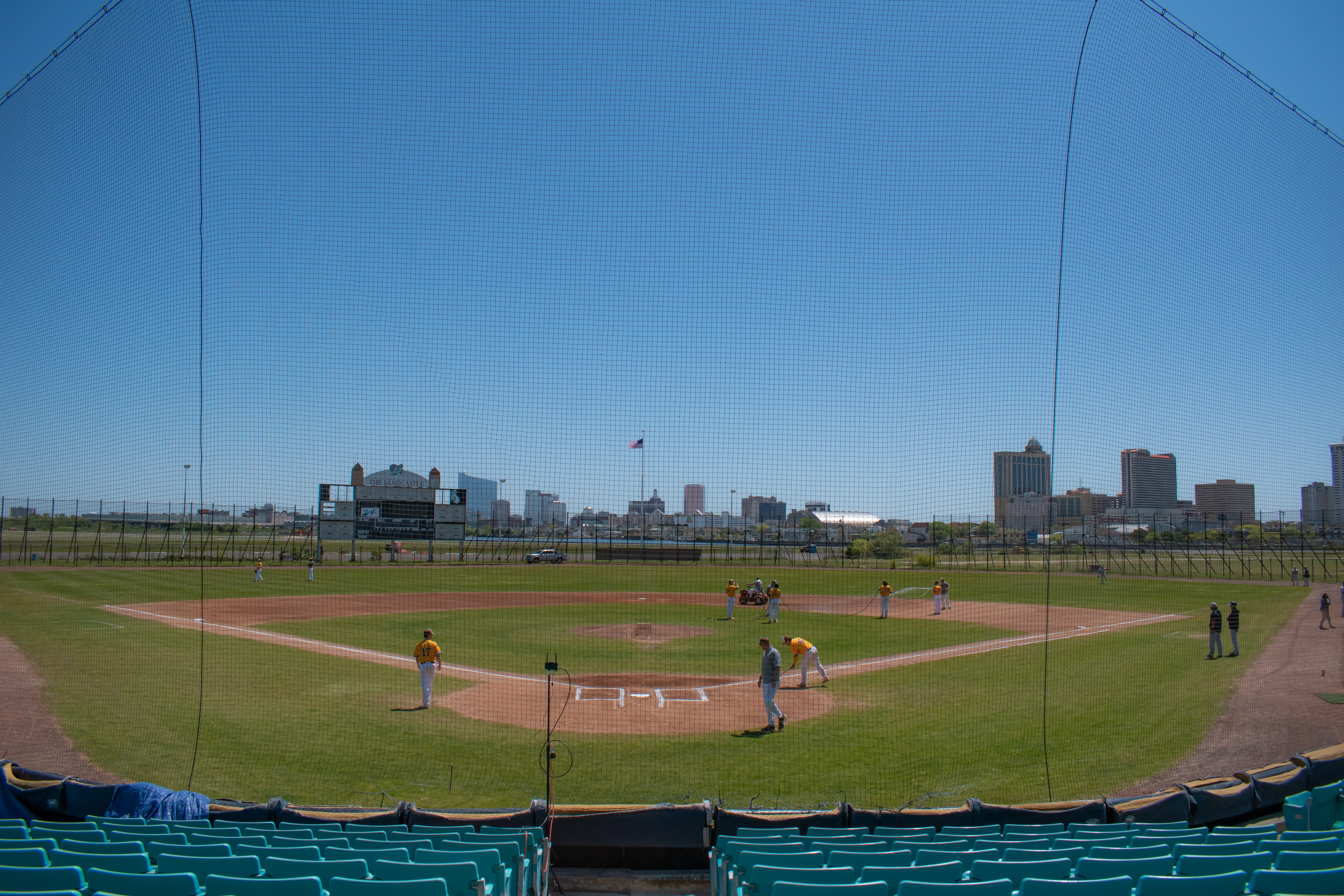
- Interior of Surf Stadium in 2021
- Interactive map of Surf Stadium
- Former names: The Sandcastle (1998–2006); Bernie Robbins Stadium (2006–2008)
- Location: 545 North Albany Avenue; Atlantic City, NJ 08401
- Coordinates: 39°21′31.01″N 74°27′031.11″W
- Operator: Atlantic City Surf (1998–2008) Atlantic Cape Community College Buccaneers (2014–present)
- Capacity: 5,500
- Surface: Natural grass
- Field size: Left Field: 309 feet (94 m); Center Field: 400 feet (120 m); Right Field: 309 feet (94 m)

Construction
- Groundbreaking: 1996
- Opened: 1998
- Cost: $15 million

Tenants
- Atlantic City Surf (Atlantic League/Can-Am League) (1998–2008); Atlantic Cape Community College Buccaneers (2014–present)

Surf Stadium is a 5,500-seat baseball stadium in Atlantic City, New Jersey, that opened in 1998 and is now the home stadium of the Atlantic Cape Community College Buccaneers baseball team. The stadium was called The Sandcastle until 2006, and has continued to be referred to by that name in some sources. It was built as the home of the Atlantic City Surf baseball team, which discontinued operations prior to the 2009 season. Renovations were performed in 2011 and 2012. The stadium was officially renamed as Surf Stadium in April 2012, and hosted a few events in 2012. College and youth teams have also used the stadium, and a music concert was held there in 2011.

The stadium is located on Albany Avenue, near the eastern terminus of U.S. Routes 40 and 322 and several blocks inland from the Boardwalk and casino strip. The casinos are visible from the seating areas.

Seating is in two primary sections, split by a "cross aisle". Luxury boxes are located above the main seating bowl.

== History ==
=== 1998–2008 ===
The stadium, originally known as The Sandcastle, opened in 1998 on a parcel located on the sprawling Bader Field, a closed municipal airport. When the park first opened, the seating sections were named for the various properties on the U.S. version of the Monopoly board, which took its names from the streets of Atlantic City and surrounding towns. However, saying "I'm sitting in Pacific Avenue" was not sufficiently descriptive, and so the seating sections were assigned numbers, as at most other stadiums. In 2006, the Bernie Robbins jewelry chain purchased the naming rights and the stadium was renamed as "Bernie Robbins Stadium".

Surf Stadium (then known as Bernie Robbins Stadium) played host to the Atlantic League All-Star Game in 1998 and 2005 as well as to various amateur baseball events and concerts. In October 2006, it was the venue for Atlantic regional qualifying for the 2008 Rugby League World Cup. In May 2008, WCAU-TV sports director and former NFL player Vai Sikahema accepted an open challenge from former MLB player Jose Canseco to fight him in a celebrity boxing match for $5,000. Canseco claims to have earned black belts in Kung Fu, Taekwondo, and Muay Thai, while Sikahema, who grew up wanting to be a professional boxer, had once fought in a National Golden Gloves Championship that was eventually won by Sugar Ray Leonard. The fight, dubbed the "War At The Shore", took place on July 12, 2008, and was hosted by Philadelphia-native adult film personality Steven Sheaffer. Sikahema won by knockout in the first round.

=== 2009–present ===
After the stadium closed, its condition seriously deteriorated due to lack of maintenance and vandalism. However, the abandoned stadium received considerable restoration in 2011 to prepare it to be used as a VIP area for a three-day musical festival headlined by the Dave Matthews Band that was held at the former Bader Field airport. Most of the improvements focused on repairing the facility's fire-suppression system and plumbing, as well as rejuvenating the field itself. The stadium was used for VIP seating for special ticket holders for the festival, and for a "Summer Fest" concert featuring rapper Rick Ross.

In April 2012, the stadium was officially renamed as "Surf Stadium", and after additional renovation work, a youth baseball league tournament was held there in August 2012.

== See also ==
- Bader Field Airport
- Bader Field (ballpark)
