= Senator Thomas J. Dodd Memorial Stadium =

Baseball stadium

- Dodd Stadium

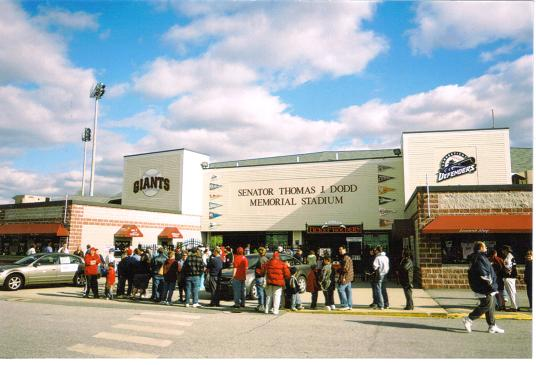
- Interactive map of Senator Thomas J. Dodd Memorial Stadium
- Location: 14 Stott Avenue; Norwich, Connecticut; United States
- Coordinates: 41°34′25.95″N 72°6′25.46″W
- Owner: City of Norwich
- Operator: Norwich Stadium Authority
- Capacity: 6,270
- Surface: Grass
- Field size: Left Field: 309 ft (94 m); Center Field: 401 ft (122 m); Right Field: 309 ft (94 m)

Construction
- Groundbreaking: November 3, 1994
- Opened: April 17, 1995
- Cost: $9.3 million ($19.7 million in 2025 dollars)
- Architects: Populous; Cook and Jepson
- Project managers: G. Schnip Construction, Inc.
- General contractor: C. R. Klewin

Tenants
- Norwich Navigators (EL) 1995–2005; Connecticut Defenders (EL) 2006–2009; Connecticut Tigers (NYPL) 2010–2019; Hartford Yard Goats (EL) 2016; Norwich Sea Unicorns (NYPL) 2020*; Mystic Schooners (NECBL) 2022–2023; Norwich Sea Unicorns (FCBL) 2021–present

Senator Thomas J. Dodd Memorial Stadium is a stadium in Norwich, Connecticut. It is primarily used for baseball, and since 2010, has been the home of the Norwich Sea Unicorns, who were previously known as the Connecticut Tigers. It was the home field of the Connecticut Defenders (previously known as the Norwich Navigators) minor league baseball team until 2009 when the Defenders announced their move to Richmond, Virginia, to become known as the Richmond Flying Squirrels. It was built in 1995 and has a seating capacity of 6,270. It is named for Eastern Connecticut native Thomas Dodd who was a United States senator and Representative from Connecticut, and the father of U.S. Senator Christopher Dodd.

== Features ==
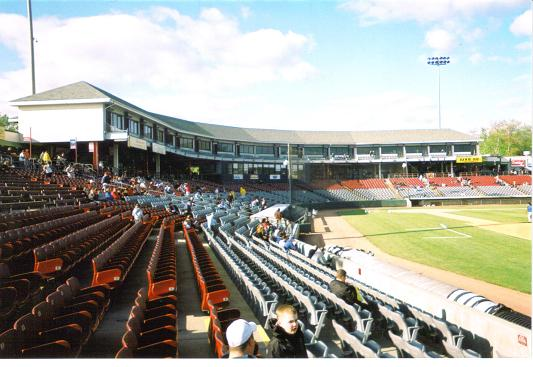

The stadium is sunk into the surrounding ground, so that all fans enter at street level and walk down to get to their seats. Each section has 22–25 rows of seating, split into box seats (closest to field) and reserved seats. Beyond first and third bases, there is a third category of general-admission seats making up the top 10 rows. A wide concourse runs around the top of the seating area, with concession stands, restrooms, and a gift shop. The press box is also located at concourse level, overlooking the field. Other than behind the press box, fans can continue to watch the game while standing in line or while walking around the stadium.

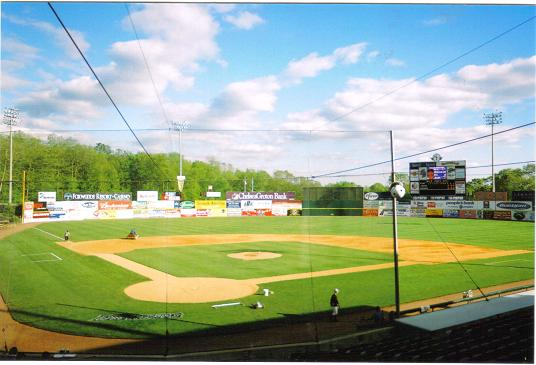

There are 18 skyboxes, elevated above the concourse and accessible by stairs or elevator for ticket-holders only. The skyboxes and their outdoor seating serve as cover for the main concourse below, and for the top couple rows of reserved seats.

Down the left- and right-field lines are grassy berms which are popular with children because they abut the bullpens. These are also frequent landing places for foul balls. The left-field side also features a large covered picnic area which can be rented out, and a kids' play area with inflatable slides. One room off the concourse has been made into a video arcade.

The stadium is located in the Norwich Business Park, and the parking fee is $3. Season ticket holders park on a paved lot on the first-base side of the stadium; all other parking is in a large gravel area.

== Events ==
Dodd Stadium hosted the 12th and final Double-A All-Star Game on July 10, 2002, in front of a standing-room-only crowd of 8,009. The three Double-A leagues began holding their own separate All-Star Games starting in 2003, with Dodd Stadium hosting the Eastern League game once again on July 11, 2007. (That game was ultimately canceled in the 3rd inning due to excessive fog.) The facility has also been the site of the New England Collegiate All-Star Game; the Big East Conference baseball tournament; several concerts including the Beach Boys, Willie Nelson, Bob Dylan, and Clint Black/Dwight Yoakam; and a TNA Wrestling event. During the fall of 2006, the stadium was used as the setting for the ESPN miniseries The Bronx Is Burning, based on a Jonathan Mahler book of the same name.

From 2002 to 2004, the stadium hosted the Atlantic 10 Conference baseball tournament. The event was won by George Washington in 2002, Richmond in 2003, and St. Bonaventure in 2004. It also has hosted the Northeast Conference baseball tournament since 2014 along with the 2011 and 2012 seasons.

The Connecticut Huskies baseball team holds some home games at Dodd Stadium, including four in 2012. As part of the 2010 NCAA Division I baseball tournament, the Huskies hosted an NCAA Regional at Dodd Stadium.

Collegiate Baseball
Date	Away	Score	Home	Attendance
June 4, 2010	Oregon	5–3	UConn	5,684
June 4, 2010	CCSU	5–25	UConn	-
June 4, 2010	Oregon	4–3	UConn	2,291
March 15, 2011	Sacred Heart	5–4	UConn	220
May 7, 2011	USF	1–2	UConn	840
May 13, 2011	Louisville	2–6	UConn	1,088
April 20, 2012	Rutgers	8–9	UConn	-
May 5, 2012	Cincinnati	1–0	UConn	421
May 5, 2012	Cincinnati	4–3	UConn	348
April 4, 2014	Bryant	7–2	UConn	205
April 5, 2014	Stony Brook	6–3	UConn	520
April 6, 2014	Bryant	5–3	UConn	623
May 13, 2014	Rhode Island	0–7	UConn	1,600
May 13, 2014	Rhode Island	12–9	UConn	285

Minor League Baseball
Date	Event	League	Attendance
July 10, 2002	2002 Double-A All-Star Game	Double-A Baseball	8,009
July 11, 2007	2007 Eastern League All-Star Game	Eastern League	
August 13, 2013	2013 New York-Penn League All-Star Game	New York-Penn League	4,774
