= ShoreTown Ballpark =

Baseball stadium in Lakewood, New Jersey

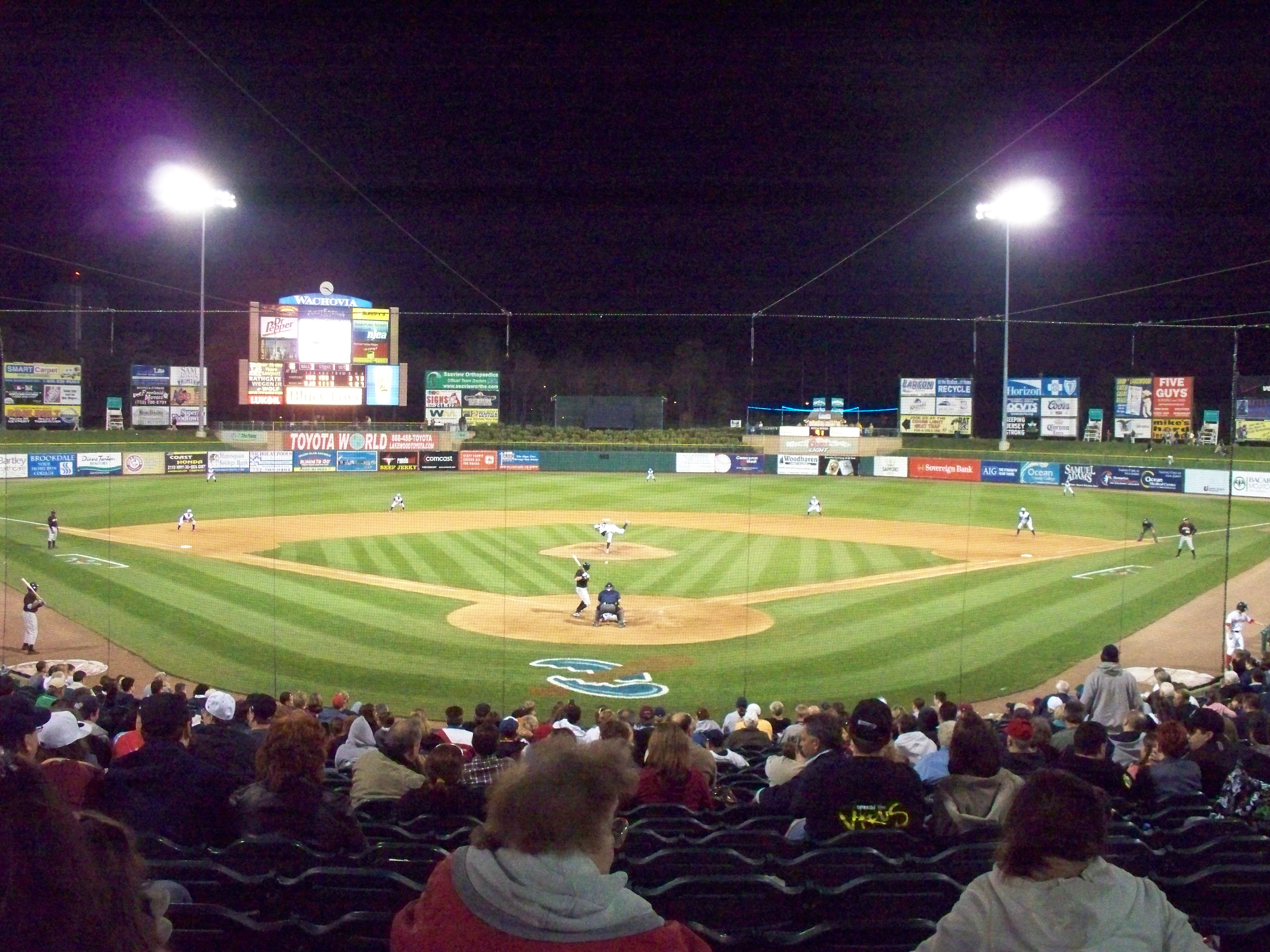

- Location within New Jersey Location within the United States
- Former names: FirstEnergy Park (2002–21); GPU Energy Park (2001)
- Address: 2 Stadium Way; Lakewood, NJ 08701
- Coordinates: 40.0751°N 74.1870°W
- Owner: Shore Town Baseball
- Capacity: 6,588 reserve seats plus additional space on berms
- Surface: Grass
- Field size: Left: 325 ft (99 m); Center: 400 ft (120 m); Right: 325 ft (99 m)

Construction
- Groundbreaking: April 17, 2000
- Opened: April 6, 2001
- Cost: $20 million ($35 million in 2025 dollars)
- Architect: HNTB
- Project manager: Hill International
- Services engineers: Henderson Engineers, Inc.
- General contractors: Epic Group, Inc.

Tenant
- Jersey Shore BlueClaws (SAL) 2001–present

ShoreTown Ballpark is a stadium in Lakewood, New Jersey. It is primarily used for baseball and is the home field of the Jersey Shore BlueClaws South Atlantic League baseball team, affiliated with the Philadelphia Phillies Major League Baseball team. It is also used for outdoor concerts, featuring touring musical artists such as Bob Dylan. It was built in 2001 and has 6,588 fixed seats with extended additional space on grass berms and at picnic tables around the 360-degree concourse.

== History ==
The stadium opened as GPU Energy Park, named for the former General Public Utilities, Inc. After GPU merged into FirstEnergy Corporation in 2001, the stadium took the new corporate name in 2002.

The team attendance record is 13,003, set on August 26, 2002. FirstEnergy Park had 13 crowds over 9,000 and 81 crowds over 8,000 in its first eight years of play.

The stadium was featured in Baseball America's 2009 Great Parks calendar. It was the second time that the home of the BlueClaws was highlighted in the calendar.

FirstEnergy Park has hosted the South Atlantic League All-Star Game twice, in 2002 and in 2013. The 2002 attendance of 8,571 was a record for the South Atlantic League All-Star Game.

In 2022, the BlueClaws changed the stadium's name from FirstEnergy Park to ShoreTown Ballpark, named for the group that owns the team.

== Features ==
The ballpark features two general admission, grass seating areas, one in left field and another in right, 16 luxury suites, two party decks, the Monmouth Medical Center Champions Club, two picnic areas, and a full video board, with a 1,587 square foot high-definition display.

The stadium also features the nine-hole Manasquan Bank Mini Golf Course which opened in 2018. Open during all home games, the course features holes named after former BlueClaws players.

In centerfield, FirstEnergy Park also includes the Toyota World of Lakewood Boardwalk area. This space features many traditional boardwalk games such as a Ring Toss, Goblet Toss, Balloon Darts, and Cat Rack.

In 2022, the BlueClaws announced the addition of a new hospitality space for patrons to enjoy during games at the stadium - The Blue Wave Bar.
