= Mount St. Mary's Mountaineers baseball =

Mount St. Mary's Mountaineers
- 2026 Mount St. Mary's Mountaineers baseball
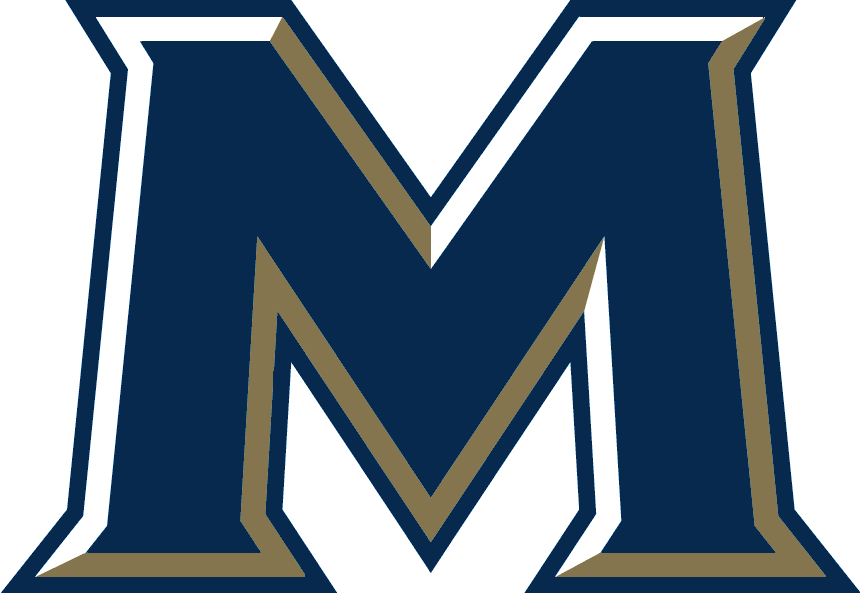
- Founded: 1893
- University: Mount St. Mary's University
- Head coach: Frank Leoni (5th season)
- Conference: MAAC
- Location: Emmitsburg, Maryland
- Home stadium: Straw Family Stadium
- Nickname: Mountaineers
- Colors: Blue and white

NCAA tournament appearances
- 2008

For information on all Mount St. Mary's University sports, see Mount St. Mary's Mountaineers

The Mount St. Mary's Mountaineers baseball team is a varsity intercollegiate athletic team of Mount St. Mary's University in Emmitsburg, Maryland, United States. The team is a member of Metro Atlantic Athletic Conference, which is part of the National Collegiate Athletic Association's Division I. Mount St. Mary's first baseball team was fielded in 1893. The team plays its home games at Straw Family Stadium in Emmitsburg, Maryland. The Mountaineers are coached by Frank Leoni.

== NCAA Tournament ==
Mount St. Mary's has participated in the NCAA Division I baseball tournament once.

Year	Region	Round	Opponent	Result
2008	Cary Regional	First Round; Lower Round 1	North Carolina; Elon	L 8–16; L 3–6

== Mountaineers in Major League Baseball ==
Since the Major League Baseball draft began in 1965, Mount St. Mary's has had 4 players selected.

Mountaineers in the Major League Baseball Draft
Year	Player	Round	Team
2003	Brian Santo	43	Tigers
2007	Michael Gioioso	50	Orioles
2007	Ivor Hodgson	17	Royals
2019	Trey McGough	24	Pirates

== See also ==
- List of NCAA Division I baseball programs
