= Fairleigh Dickinson Knights baseball =

- 2026 Fairleigh Dickinson Knights baseball team
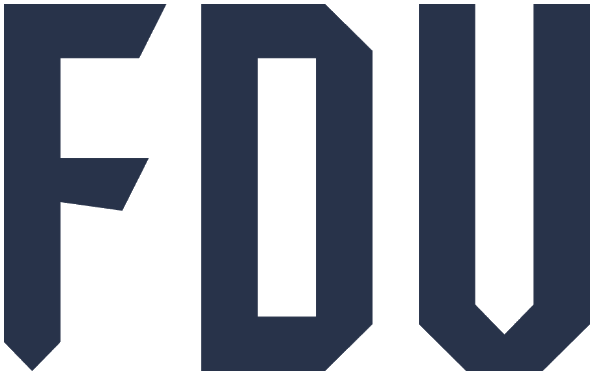
- University: Fairleigh Dickinson University
- Head coach: Manny Roman (4th season)
- Conference: Northeast Conference
- Location: Teaneck, New Jersey
- Home stadium: Naimoli Family Baseball Complex (Capacity: 500)
- Nickname: Knights
- Colors: Burgundy and blue

Conference regular season champions
- 1987, 1988, 1993, 1994

The Fairleigh Dickinson Knights baseball team is the varsity intercollegiate athletic team of the Fairleigh Dickinson University in Teaneck, New Jersey, United States. The team competes in the National Collegiate Athletic Association's Division I and is a member of the Northeast Conference (NEC).
