= 2016 Northeast Conference men's soccer season =

Northeast Conference
- Season: 2016
- Champions: St. Francis Brooklyn (4th)
- NEC tournament champions: St. Francis Brooklyn (7th)
- NCAA tournament participants: St. Francis Brooklyn (8th)
- Matches: 28
- Goals: 65 (2.32 per match)
- Top goalscorer: Rasmus Hansen, LIU (11 goals)
- Biggest home win: LIU vs SHU, 5–0
- Highest scoring: CCSU at LIU, 2–7
- Longest winning run: 5 games, SFBK
- Longest unbeaten run: 7 games, SFBK
- Longest winless run: 5 games, CCSU & RMU
- Longest losing run: 4 games, RMU

2016 Northeast Conference men's soccer standings
	Conf.					Overall
Team	W		L		T	W		L		T
St. Francis Brooklyn ‡	6	–	0	–	1	12	–	6	–	3
Saint Francis (PA)	4	–	1	–	2	12	–	6	–	2
LIU Brooklyn	4	–	2	–	1	10	–	6	–	2
Sacred Heart	3	–	4	–	0	5	–	11	–	2
Bryant	2	–	2	–	3	3	–	10	–	3
Fairleigh Dickinson	1	–	3	–	3	3	–	11	–	3
Robert Morris	1	–	5	–	1	4	–	11	–	2
Central Connecticut	1	–	5	–	1	2	–	12	–	3
‡-Tournament champion + - Invited to the NCAA Division I Men's Soccer Championship; As of 18 November 2016; Rankings from NSCAA

The 2016 Northeast Conference men's soccer season was the 36th season of men's varsity soccer in the conference.

The LIU Brooklyn Blackbirds were the defending regular season and tournament champions.

St. Francis Brooklyn won the Regular season Championship by going 6-0-1 in conference play and won the Tournament championship by defeating Sacred Heart and Saint Francis (PA). St. Francis Brooklyn will play against Dartmouth in the NCAA tournament.

== Changes from 2015 ==
- None

== Teams ==
Team	Location	Stadium	Capacity	Head coach	Seasons at school	Record at school
Bryant Bulldogs	Smithfield, Rhode Island	Bulldog Stadium	5,500	Seamus Purcell	20	129–174–32
Central Connecticut Blue Devils	New Britain, Connecticut	CCSU Soccer Field	550	Shaun Green	31	267–250–58
Fairleigh Dickinson Knights	Florham Park, New Jersey	FDU Stadium	500	Seth Roland	18	183–130–43
LIU Brooklyn Blackbirds	Brooklyn, New York	LIU Field	400	TJ Kostecky	17	110–158–39
Robert Morris Colonials	Moon Township, Pennsylvania	North Athletic Complex	800	Bill Denniston	20	138–197–42
Sacred Heart Pioneers	Fairfield, Connecticut	Campus Field	3,334	Joe Barroso	11	75–100–20
St. Francis Brooklyn Terriers	Brooklyn, New York	Brooklyn Bridge Park, Pier 5	300	Tom Giovatto	9	80—59—26
Saint Francis Red Flash	Loretto, Pennsylvania	DeGol Field	500	Paulo Neto	1	11—5—4

Notes:

- All records, appearances, titles, etc. are from time with current school only.
- Year at school includes 2016 season.
- Overall and NEC records are from time at current school and are before the beginning of the season.

== Preseason ==
=== Rankings ===
	NEC Coaches Poll
1.	LIU Brooklyn (6)
2.	Saint Francis PA (2)
3.	St. Francis Brooklyn
4.	Central Connecticut
5.	Bryant
	Robert Morris
7.	Fairleigh Dickinson
8.	Sacred Heart

() first place votes

== Regular season ==
=== Player of the week ===
Throughout the regular season, the Northeast Conference offices named a player of the week and a freshman of the week each Monday.

Week (Date)	Player of the week	Freshman of the week
1 (Aug. 29, 2016)	Djiby Sarr, SFBK	Giuseppe Barone, LIU
2 (Sept. 5, 2016)	Marcus Rojas, SFU	Sebastian Ferreira, FDU
3 (Sept. 12, 2016)	Nicco Mastrangelo, SFU	Marius Koss, LIU
4 (Sept. 19, 2016)	Simen Hestnes, LIU	Faouzi Taieb, SFBK
5 (Sept. 26, 2016)	Yussuf Olajide, SFBK	Robert Strain, SHU
6 (Oct. 3, 2016)	Romario Guscott, LIU	Giuseppe Barone, LIU
7 (Oct. 10, 2016)	Dominick Falanga, SFBK	Oliver Larente, BU
8 (Oct. 17, 2016)	Salvatore Barone, SFBK	David Bokumabi, FDU
9 (Oct. 24, 2016)	Naeem Charles, LIU	Giuseppe Barone, LIU; Oliver Larente, BU
10 (Oct. 31, 2016)	Rasmus Hansen, LIU; Francis de Vries, SFU	Hadynho Sarr, SHU
11 (Nov. 7, 2016)	Shaquille Saunchez, SHU	Robert Strain, SHU

=== Rankings ===
==== NSCAA national ====
Legend
Increase in ranking
Decrease in ranking
Not ranked previous week

	Pre	Wk 1	Wk 2	Wk 3	Wk 4	Wk 5	Wk 6	Wk 7	Wk 8	Wk 9	Wk 10	Wk 11	Wk 12	Final
Bryant														
Central Connecticut														
Fairleigh Dickinson														
LIU Brooklyn														
Robert Morris														
Sacred Heart														
St. Francis Brooklyn														
Saint Francis (PA)														

==== NSCAA northeast region ====
	Wk 1	Wk 2	Wk 3	Wk 4	Wk 5	Wk 6	Wk 7	Wk 8	Wk 9	Wk 10	Wk 11	Wk 12
Bryant												
Central Connecticut												
Fairleigh Dickinson												
LIU Brooklyn	7	9	9	6	6	4	4	6	6	6	8	8
Robert Morris												
Sacred Heart												
St. Francis Brooklyn	8				10		9	4	5	3	3	3
Saint Francis (PA)			5	5	5	6	5	8	9	8	7	6

=== Results ===
Legend
Win
Lose
Tie

	Opponent							
Team	BRY	CCSU	FDU	LIU	RMU	SHU	SFBK	SFU
Bryant Bulldogs		3–1	0–2	1–1	3–0	2–3	1–1	1–1
Central Connecticut Blue Devils	1–3		1–1	2–7	0–1	2–1	0–2	3–0
Fairleigh Dickinson Knights	2–0	1–1		0–2	1–1	0–2	0–3	1–1
LIU Brooklyn Blackbirds	1–1	7–2	2–0		3–1	5–0	0–1	0–3
Robert Morris Colonials	0–3	1–0	1–1	1–3		0–3	0–2	0–1
Sacred Heart Pioneers	3–2	1–2	2–0	0–5	3–0		0–2	0–1
St. Francis Brooklyn Terriers	1–1	2–0	3–0	1–0	2–0	2–0		2–0
Saint Francis Red Flash	1–1	0–3	1–1	3–0	1–0	1–0	0–2	

=== All-NEC awards and teams ===
2016 NEC Men's Soccer Individual Awards
Award	Recipient(s)
Player of the Year	Simen Hestnes, LIU
Coach of the Year	Tom Giovatto, SFBK
Defensive Player of the Year	Collyns Laokandi, SFBK
Rookie of the Year	Faouzi Taieb, SFBK

2016 NEC Men's Soccer All-Conference Teams
First Team	Second Team	Rookie Team
Rasmus Hansen, So., FW, LIU; Shaquille Saunchez, Sr., FW, SHU; Naeem Charles, R-Jr., MD, LIU; Simen Hestnes, So., MD, LIU; Salvatore Barone, Sr., MD, SFBK; Dominick Falanga, Jr., MD, SFBK; Pedro Neto, Jr., MD, SFU; Collyns Laokandi, Jr., DF, SFBK; Francis de Vries, Sr., DF, SFU; Jack Webber, Gr., DF, SFU; Robert Bazzichetto, Jr., GK, SFBK	Romario Guscott, So., FW, LIU; Yussuf Olajide, Sr., FW, SFBK; Andres Muriel Albino, Fr., MD, CCSU; Giuseppe Barone, Fr., MD, LIU; Keane McIvor, Jr., MD, RMU; Fabian Suele, Sr., MD, SFBK; Troye Kiernan, Jr., MD, SFU; Charlie Booth, So., DF, BRY; Julian Linke, Sr., DF, SHU; Eric Wahlin, So., DF, LIU; Nick Velleca, Sr., GK, CCSU	Andres Muriel Albino, Fr., MD, CCSU; David Bokumabi, Fr., MD, FDU; Daniel Lasarte, R-Fr., MD, FDU; Giuseppe Barone, Fr., MD, LIU; Marius Koss, Fr., DF, LIU; Oscar Curras, Fr., DF, SHU; Robert Strain, Fr., GK, SHU; Djiby Sarr, Fr., MD, SFBK; Faouzi Taieb, Fr., DF, SFBK; Tulio Canineu, So., MD, SFU

== Postseason ==
=== NEC tournament ===
The 2016 Northeast Conference men's soccer tournament was held at Pier 5 in Brooklyn Bridge Park in Brooklyn, NY, the home of St. Francis Brooklyn. The semifinals took place on November 11 and the championship on November 13.

Semifinals; November 11, 2016
1	St. Francis Brooklyn	1
4	Sacred Heart	0
2	Saint Francis (PA)	1
3	LIU Brooklyn	0

Final; November 13, 2016; 1:00pm EST
1	St. Francis Brooklyn	1^{2OT}
2	Saint Francis (PA)	0

=== NCAA tournament ===
Seed	Region	School	1st round	2nd round	3rd round	Quarterfinals	Semifinals	Championship
	1	St. Francis Brooklyn	L, 0–1 vs. Dartmouth					

== See also ==
- 2016 NCAA Division I men's soccer season
