= 2017 Northeast Conference men's soccer season =

Northeast Conference
- Season: 2017
- Champions: St. Francis Brooklyn (5th)
- NEC tournament champions: St. Francis Brooklyn (8th)
- NCAA tournament participants: St. Francis Brooklyn (9th)
- Matches: 28
- Goals: 60 (2.14 per match)
- Best player: Rasmus Hansen, LIU
- Top goalscorer: Mario Mastrangelo, SFPA (13)
- Best goalkeeper: Nick Stewart, BRY (81.1% Save Percent- 63 Saves against 13 Goals)
- Biggest home win: SFPA 4-1 RMU (3 November 2017)
- Biggest away win: FDU 3-0 SHU (3 November 2017)
- Highest scoring: CCSU 5-3 SFPA (8 October 2017)
- Longest winning run: 5 games by SFBK
- Longest unbeaten run: 7 games by SFBK
- Longest winless run: 7 games by SHU
- Longest losing run: 5 games by SHU
- Highest attendance: 407, BRY at LIU
- Lowest attendance: 13, BRY at SFBK
- Total attendance: 5,808
- Average attendance: 207

2017 Northeast Conference men's soccer standings
	Conf.					Overall
Team	W		L		T	W		L		T
St. Francis Brooklyn ‡	6	–	0	–	1	14	–	5	–	1
LIU Brooklyn	4	–	2	–	1	6	–	9	–	3
Fairleigh Dickinson	3	–	2	–	2	10	–	5	–	3
Robert Morris	3	–	3	–	1	4	–	11	–	3
Saint Francis (PA)	3	–	4	–	0	10	–	8	–	0
Central Connecticut	2	–	3	–	2	5	–	8	–	4
Bryant	2	–	3	–	2	2	–	10	–	3
Sacred Heart	0	–	6	–	1	3	–	14	–	1
‡ – 2017 NEC Tournament champion + – Invited to the 2017 NCAA Division I Men's Soccer Championship; As of November 17, 2017; Rankings from United Soccer Coaches

The 2017 Northeast Conference men's soccer season was the 37th season of men's varsity soccer in the conference.

The St. Francis Brooklyn Terriers are the defending regular season and tournament champions. For 2017, St. Francis Brooklyn repeated as Regular season Championship by going 6-0-1 in conference play. Dating back to last year, St. Francis Brooklyn has gone undefeated in two seasons of conference play recording a 12-0-2 record.

== Changes from 2016 ==
- None

== Teams ==
Team	Location	Stadium	Capacity	Head coach	Seasons at school	Record at school
Bryant Bulldogs	Smithfield, Rhode Island	Bulldog Stadium	5,500	Seamus Purcell	21	132–184–35
Central Connecticut Blue Devils	New Britain, Connecticut	CCSU Soccer Field	550	Shaun Green	32	269–262–61
Fairleigh Dickinson Knights	Florham Park, New Jersey	FDU Stadium	500	Seth Roland	19	186–141–46
LIU Brooklyn Blackbirds	Brooklyn, New York	LIU Field	400	TJ Kostecky	18	120–164–41
Robert Morris Colonials	Moon Township, Pennsylvania	North Athletic Complex	800	Bill Denniston	21	142–208–44
Sacred Heart Pioneers	Fairfield, Connecticut	Campus Field	3,334	Joe Barroso	12	80–111–22
St. Francis Brooklyn Terriers	Brooklyn, New York	Brooklyn Bridge Park, Pier 5	300	Tom Giovatto	10	92—64—29
Saint Francis Red Flash	Loretto, Pennsylvania	DeGol Field	500	Paulo Neto	2	23—11—6

Notes:

- All records, appearances, titles, etc. are from time with current school only.
- Year at school includes 2017 season.
- Overall and NEC records are from time at current school and are before the beginning of the season.

== Preseason ==
After winning its third Northeast Conference (NEC) men’s soccer championship in the last four seasons, St. Francis Brooklyn was unanimously picked by the league’s head coaches to win again in 2017. Saint Francis (PA) was tabbed second in the preseason poll.

=== Rankings ===
	NEC Coaches Poll
1.	St. Francis Brooklyn (7)
2.	Saint Francis PA (1)
3.	LIU Brooklyn
4.	Bryant
5.	Fairleigh Dickinson
	Sacred Heart
7.	Central Connecticut
8.	Robert Morris

() first place votes

== Regular season ==
After starting the season undefeated, Fairleigh Dickinson, received 2 votes to be ranked in the week 2 NSCAA Division I poll. For the week 3 and 4 polls, FDU was nationally ranked at 21.

The Saint Francis Red Flash defeated 20th ranked Old Dominion, 5–3. It was SFU's first win over a nationally-ranked opponent since defeating No. 7 Monmouth 2-0 on Oct. 25, 2009.

Collectively, NEC teams finished 28–43–8 against non-conference opponents for 2017.

Index to colors and formatting
NEC member won
NEC member lost
NEC member tied
NEC teams in **bold**

All times Eastern time.† denotes Homecoming game

=== Week 1 (Aug 21-27) ===
Schedule and results:

Date	Time (ET)	Visiting team	Home team	Site	Result	Attendance
August 25	1:00 p.m.	Duquesne	**Saint Francis (PA)**	Stokes Soccerplex • Loretto, PA	**W** 2–4	200
August 25	4:00 p.m.	NJIT	**Sacred Heart**	Campus Field • Fairfield, CT	**L** 1–0	315
August 25	4:00 p.m.	**St. Francis Brooklyn**	UMass	Rudd Field • Amherst, MA	**L** 2–1	326
August 25	5:00 p.m.	**LIU Brooklyn**	Western Michigan	WMU Soccer Complex • Kalamazoo, MI	**L** 2–3	421
August 25	7:00 p.m.	#18 UMass Lowell	**Central Connecticut**	CCSU Soccer Field • New Britain, CT	**L** 2–1 ^{OT}	400
August 25	7:00 p.m.	**Bryant**	UMBC	Retriever Soccer Park • Baltimore, MD	**L** 0–1	735
August 25	7:00 p.m.	**Fairleigh Dickinson**	Lafayette	Oaks Stadium • Easton, PA	**W** 2–0	634
August 25	7:00 p.m.	**Robert Morris**	Cleveland State	Krenzler Field • Cleveland, OH	**L** 1–3	282
August 27	3:00 p.m.	St. Bonaventure	**Robert Morris**	North Athletic Complex • Moon Township, PA	**L** 3–2 ^{2OT}	612
August 27	3:00 p.m.	**LIU Brooklyn**	Detroit	Titan Field • Detroit, MI	**L** 0–1	177
August 27	3:30 p.m.	**Sacred Heart**	UMass	Rudd Field • Amherst, MA	**L** 3–0	362
August 27	5:00 p.m.	**Saint Francis (PA)**	Bucknell	Emmitt Field • Lewisburg, PA	**L** 0–1	325

Players of the week:

Offensive		Rookie	
Player	Team	Player	Team
Troye Kiernan	Saint Francis (PA)	Kevin Smolyn	Saint Francis (PA)
Reference: Northeast Conference

=== Week 2 (Aug 28-Sept 3) ===
Schedule and results:

Date	Time (ET)	Visiting team	Home team	Site	Result	Attendance
August 28	7:00 p.m.	Manhattan	**Fairleigh Dickinson**	FDU Stadium • Teaneck, NJ	**W** 1–3	223
August 28	7:00 p.m.	**Bryant**	Delaware	Grant Stadium • Newark, DE	**L** 0–2	827
August 29	4:00 p.m.	Lafayette	**St. Francis Brooklyn**	Brooklyn Bridge Park • Brooklyn, NY	**W** 1–2	172
August 31	4:30 p.m.	**Robert Morris**	Canisius	Demske Sports Complex • Albany, NY	**L** 3–4 ^{OT}	265
August 31	7:00 p.m.	**Sacred Heart**	Manhattan	Gaelic Park • Riverdale, NY	**L** 0–1	212
September 1	4:00 p.m.	Brown	**Bryant**	Bulldog Stadium • Smithfield, RI	**L** 1–0	324
September 1	4:00 p.m.	**LIU Brooklyn**	NC State	Dail Soccer Stadium • Raleigh, NC	**Cancelled**	
September 1	4:30 p.m.	Niagara	**Central Connecticut**	Virtue Field • Burlington, VT; Peter Baldwin Memorial Classic	**W** 1–3	75
September 1	4:30 p.m.	**Fairleigh Dickinson**	Yale	Reese Stadium • New Haven, CT	**W** 2–0	397
September 1	7:00 p.m.	**Saint Francis (PA)**	#20 Old Dominion	ODU Soccer Complex • Norfolk, VA	**W** 5–3	741
September 1	7:00 p.m.	George Washington	**St. Francis Brooklyn**	Brooklyn Bridge Park • Brooklyn, NY	**W** 1–3	225
September 3	11:30 a.m.	FGCU	**Central Connecticut**	Virtue Field • Burlington, VT; Peter Baldwin Memorial Classic	**W** 0–2	25
September 3	1:00 p.m.	**St. Francis Brooklyn**	Saint Peter's	Caven Point • Jersey City, NJ	**W** 3–2	250
September 3	1:00 p.m.	**LIU Brooklyn**	Appalachian State	ASU Soccer Stadium • Boone, NC	**T** 1–1 ^{2OT}	315
September 3	1:00 p.m.	Marshall	Robert Morris	North Athletic Complex • Moon Township, PA	**L** 2–1	106
September 3	7:00 p.m.	**Saint Francis (PA)**	VCU	Sports Backers Stadium • Richmond, VA	**L** 2–3	352

Players of the week:

Offensive		Rookie	
Player	Team	Player	Team
Fredinho Mompremier	Fairleigh Dickinson	Tiago Capela; Filippo Pirola	Fairleigh Dickinson; Central Connecticut
Reference: Northeast Conference

=== Week 3 (Sept 4-Sept 10) ===
Schedule and results:

Date	Time (ET)	Visiting team	Home team	Site	Result	Attendance
September 4	7:00 p.m.	**Sacred Heart**	Seton Hall	Owen T. Carroll Field • South Orange, NJ	**L** 0–3	403
September 4	7:00 p.m.	**#21 Fairleigh Dickinson**	Army	Clinton Field • West Point, NY	**W** 2–1	0
September 4	7:00 p.m.	**Bryant**	Providence	Anderson Stadium • Providence, RI	**L** 0–3	2,500
September 6	6:00 p.m.	NJIT	**LIU Brooklyn**	LIU Field • Brooklyn, NY	**L** 1–0	302
September 6	7:00 p.m.	**St. Francis Brooklyn**	Howard	Greene Stadium • Washington, DC	**W** 1–0	75
September 6	7:00 p.m.	**Central Connecticut**	Stony Brook	LaValle Stadium • Stony Brook, NY	**L** 1–2	158
September 7	7:00 p.m.	**Bryant**	Rhode Island	URI Soccer Complex • Kingston, RI	**L** 0–4	318
September 8	4:00 p.m.	**Robert Morris**	Niagara	Elmore Field • Oneonta, NY; Mayor's Cup	**L** 1–2	20
September 8	7:00 p.m.	**Saint Francis (PA)**	Penn State	Jeffrey Field • University Park, PA	**L** 0–1 ^{2OT}	1,339
September 9	5:00 p.m.	Saint Peter's	**Sacred Heart**	Campus Field • Fairfield, CT	**W** 1–2 ^{2OT}	115
September 9	7:00 p.m.	Iona	**#21 Fairleigh Dickinson**	FDU Stadium • Teaneck, NJ	**W** 2–3	310
September 9	7:30 p.m.	**St. Francis Brooklyn**	NJIT	Kean University Alumni Stadium • Hillside, NJ	**L** 0–3	397
September 10	12:00 p.m.	**Robert Morris**	Fairfield	Elmore Field • Oneonta, NY; Mayor's Cup	**L** 1–2	50
September 10	1:00 p.m.	**Central Connecticut**	Canisius	Demske Sports Complex • Buffalo, NY	**L** 0–4	145
September 10	3:00 p.m.	Colgate	**Saint Francis (PA)**	Stokes Soccerplex • Loretto, PA	**W** 0–3	250

Players of the week:

Offensive		Rookie	
Player	Team	Player	Team
Mario Mastrangelo	Saint Francis (PA)	Jacob Labovitz	Fairleigh Dickinson
Reference: Northeast Conference

=== Week 4 (Sept 11-Sept 17) ===
Schedule and results:

Date	Time (ET)	Visiting team	Home team	Site	Result	Attendance
September 12	4:00 p.m.	Saint Joseph's	**Sacred Heart**	Campus Field • Fairfield, CT	**W** 1–2 ^{OT}	120
September 13	7:00 p.m.	Hartford	**St. Francis Brooklyn**	Brooklyn Bridge Park • Brooklyn, NY	**L** 1–0	277
September 13	7:00 p.m.	**Central Connecticut**	Howard	Greene Stadium • Washington, DC	**W** 3–1	0
September 15	7:00 p.m.	**Saint Francis (PA)**	UNLV	Peter Johann Soccer Field • Las Vegas, NV; Johann Memorial Classic	**W** 1–0 ^{OT}	893
September 16	1:00 p.m.	Stony Brook	**Bryant**	Bulldog Stadium • Smithfield, RI	**L** 1–0	254
September 16	1:00 p.m.	**LIU Brooklyn**	Rider	Ben Cohen Field • Lawrenceville, NJ	**L** 1–2 ^{2OT}	428
September 16	2:00 p.m.	**St. Francis Brooklyn**	Manhattan	Gaelic Park • Riverdale, NY	**W** 2–1	180
September 16	3:00 p.m.	Siena	Sacred Heart	Campus Field • Fairfield, CT	**L** 2–1 ^{2OT}	110
September 16	3:00 p.m.	**#21 Fairleigh Dickinson**	NJIT	Kean University Alumni Stadium • Hillside, NJ	**T** 1–1 ^{2OT}	512
September 16	4:00 p.m.	Bucknell	**Robert Morris**	North Athletic Complex • Moon Township, PA	**T** 1–1 ^{2OT}	231
September 17	10:30 p.m.	**Saint Francis (PA)**	Cal State Bakersfield	Peter Johann Soccer Field • Las Vegas, NV; Johann Memorial Classic	**W** 2–1 ^{OT}	516

Players of the week:

Offensive		Rookie	
Player	Team	Player	Team
Mario Mastrangelo (2nd)	Saint Francis (PA)	Alejandro Arribas	Sacred Heart
Reference: Northeast Conference

=== Week 5 (Sept 18-Sept 24) ===
Schedule and results:

Date	Time (ET)	Visiting team	Home team	Site	Result	Attendance
September 19	7:00 p.m.	**Robert Morris**	Pittsburgh	Ambrose Urbanic Field • Pittsburgh, PA	**L** 1–2	431
September 19	7:00 p.m.	Rider	**Fairleigh Dickinson**	FDU Stadium • Teaneck, NJ	**L** 2–1	120
September 19	7:00 p.m.	UMass	**Central Connecticut**	CCSU Soccer Field • New Britain, CT	**T** 1–1 ^{2OT}	233
September 20	4:00 p.m.	Iona	**Sacred Heart**	Campus Field • Fairfield, CT	**W** 0–1 ^{OT}	105
September 22	4:30 p.m.	**St. Francis Brooklyn**	Cornell	Charles F. Berman Field • Ithaca, NY	**L** 1–2	224
September 22	6:00 p.m.	Siena	**LIU Brooklyn**	LIU Field • Brooklyn, NY	**L** 2–0	364
September 22	7:00 p.m.	Columbia	**Central Connecticut**	CCSU Soccer Field • New Britain, CT	**L** 2–0	574
September 23	1:00 p.m.	**Bryant**	Fordham	Jack Coffey Field • Bronx, NY	**L** 0–1	345
September 23	7:00 p.m.	Princeton	**Fairleigh Dickinson**	FDU Stadium • Teaneck, NJ	**L** 2–0	288
September 24	1:00 p.m.	Duquesne	**Robert Morris**	North Athletic Complex • Moon Township, PA	**T** 1–1 ^{2OT}	127
September 24	2:30 p.m.	Howard	**LIU Brooklyn**	LIU Field • Brooklyn, NY	**W** 1–3	289

Players of the week:

Offensive		Rookie	
Player	Team	Player	Team
Oscar Curras	Sacred Heart		
Reference: Northeast Conference

=== Week 6 (Sept 25-Oct 1) ===
Schedule and results:

Date	Time (ET)	Visiting team	Home team	Site	Result	Attendance
September 26	7:00 p.m.	**Sacred Heart**	Army	Clinton Field • West Point, NY	**L** 1–2	327
September 26	7:00 p.m.	Hartwick	**St. Francis Brooklyn**	Brooklyn Bridge Park • Brooklyn, NY	**W** 1–2	486
September 26	7:00 p.m.	Hartford	**Central Connecticut**	CCSU Soccer Field • New Britain, CT	**L** 3–2 ^{OT}	503
September 27	5:00 p.m.	**Saint Francis (PA)**	Howard	Greene Stadium • Washington, DC	**W** 5–0	100
September 27	7:00 p.m.	Bucknell	**Fairleigh Dickinson**	FDU Stadium • Teaneck, NJ	**W** 2–3 ^{OT}	214
September 27	7:00 p.m.	**LIU Brooklyn**	La Salle	McCarthy Stadium • Philadelphia, PA	**T** 1–1 ^{2OT}	375
September 30	3:00 p.m.	St. Bonaventure	**Saint Francis (PA)**	Stokes Soccerplex • Loretto, PA	**L** 1–0	179
September 30	5:00 p.m.	**Bryant**	Hartwick	Elmore Field • Oneonta, NY	**T** 0–0 ^{2OT}	150
September 30	7:00 p.m.	**Central Connecticut**	Saint Joseph's	Sweeney Field • Philadelphia, PA	**T** 1–1 ^{2OT}	288
October 1	2:30 p.m.	Howard	**Robert Morris**	North Athletic Complex • Moon Township, PA	**W** 1–2	221

Players of the week:

Offensive		Rookie	
Player	Team	Player	Team
Ahu Obhakhan	Fairleigh Dickinson	Diego Arriba	Fairleigh Dickinson
Reference: Northeast Conference

=== Week 7 (Oct 2-Oct 8) ===
Schedule and results:

Date	Time (ET)	Visiting team	Home team	Site	Result	Attendance
October 3	3:00 p.m.	NJIT	**Saint Francis (PA)**	Stokes Soccerplex • Loretto, PA	**W** 2–4	97
October 3	6:00 p.m.	Albany	**LIU Brooklyn**	LIU Field • Brooklyn, NY	**L** 2–1	204
October 3	7:00 p.m.	**Sacred Heart**	Stony Brook	LaValle Stadium • Stony Brook, NY	**L** 1–4 ^{OT}	313
October 6	2:00 p.m.	**Robert Morris**	**Central Connecticut**	CCSU Soccer Field • New Britain, CT	**RMU** 1–0	234
October 6	3:00 p.m.	**Fairleigh Dickinson**	**Bryant**	Bulldog Stadium • Smithfield, RI	**BRY** 2–0	298
October 8	1:00 p.m.	**Saint Francis (PA)**	**Central Connecticut**	CCSU Soccer Field • New Britain, CT	**CCSU** 5–3	284
October 8	3:00 p.m.	**LIU Brooklyn**	**Sacred Heart**	Campus Field • Fairfield, CT	**LIU** 2–0	140
October 8	7:00 p.m.	**St. Francis Brooklyn**	**Fairleigh Dickinson**	FDU Stadium • Teaneck, NJ	**SFBK** 1–0	215

Players of the week:

Offensive		Rookie	
Player	Team	Player	Team
Andres Albino	Central Connecticut	Matthew Kane	Bryant
Reference: Northeast Conference

=== Week 8 (Oct 9-Oct 15) ===
Schedule and results:

October 13	3:00 p.m.	Fairleigh Dickinson	Saint Francis (PA)	Stokes Soccerplex • Loretto, PA	**FDU** 2–1 ^{2OT}	101
October 13	3:00 p.m.	Bryant	Robert Morris	North Athletic Complex • Moon Township, PA	**T** 1–1 ^{2OT}	301
October 13	4:00 p.m.	LIU Brooklyn	Central Connecticut	CCSU Soccer Field • New Britain, CT	**LIU** 3–2 ^{2OT}	276
October 13	7:00 p.m.	Sacred Heart	St. Francis Brooklyn	Brooklyn Bridge Park • Brooklyn, NY	**T** 0–0 ^{2OT}	110
October 15	1:00 p.m.	Bryant	Saint Francis (PA)	Stokes Soccerplex • Loretto, PA	**SFPA** 1–0 ^{2OT}	119
October 15	1:00 p.m.	Fairleigh Dickinson	Robert Morris	North Athletic Complex • Moon Township, PA	**FDU** 1–0	193
October 15	1:00 p.m.	Central Connecticut	Sacred Heart	Campus Field • Fairfield, CT	**CCSU** 1–0	205

Players of the week:

Offensive		Rookie	
Player	Team	Player	Team
Jamie Leddy	Fairleigh Dickinson	Jahmali Waite	Fairleigh Dickinson
Reference: Northeast Conference

=== Week 9 (Oct 16-Oct 22) ===
Schedule and results:

October 20	6:30 p.m.	Saint Francis (PA)	LIU Brooklyn	LIU Field • Brooklyn, NY	**LIU** 2–1	209
October 20	7:00 p.m.	Robert Morris	St. Francis Brooklyn	Brooklyn Bridge Park • Brooklyn, NY	**SFBK** 3–1	175
October 22	12:00 p.m.	Sacred Heart	Bryant	Bulldog Stadium • Smithfield, RI	**BRY** 2–1 ^{2OT}	256
October 22	1:00 p.m.	Robert Morris	LIU Brooklyn	LIU Field • Brooklyn, NY	**RMU** 1–0	320
October 22	1:00 p.m.	Saint Francis (PA)	St. Francis Brooklyn	Brooklyn Bridge Park • Brooklyn, NY	**SFBK** 1–0	212
October 22	5:00 p.m.	Central Connecticut	Fairleigh Dickinson	FDU Stadium • Teaneck, NJ	**T** 1–1 ^{2OT}	211

Players of the week:

Offensive		Rookie	
Player	Team	Player	Team
Dominic Falanga	St. Francis Brooklyn	Chris Gruver	St. Francis Brooklyn
Reference: Northeast Conference

=== Week 10 (Oct 23-Oct 29) ===
Schedule and results:

October 24	5:00 p.m.	**Fairleigh Dickinson**	Howard	Greene Stadium • Washington, DC	**W** 2–1	50
October 27	2:00 p.m.	**Sacred Heart**	**Saint Francis (PA)**	Stokes Soccerplex • Loretto, PA	**SFPA** 2–0	170
October 27	4:00 p.m.	**St. Francis Brooklyn**	**Central Connecticut**	CCSU Soccer Field • New Britain, CT	**SFBK** 1–0	227
October 27	5:00 p.m.	**Bryant**	**LIU Brooklyn**	LIU Field • Brooklyn, NY	**LIU** 1–0	407
October 29	1:00 p.m.	**Sacred Heart**	**Robert Morris**	North Athletic Complex • Moon Township, PA	**RMU** 1–0 ^{OT}	175

Players of the week:

Offensive		Rookie	
Player	Team	Player	Team
Jacob Labovitz	Fairleigh Dickinson	Jacob Labovitz (2)	Fairleigh Dickinson
Reference: Northeast Conference

=== Week 11 (Oct 30-Nov 5) ===
Schedule and results:

October 30	1:00 p.m.	Bryant	**St. Francis Brooklyn**	Brooklyn Bridge Park • Brooklyn, NY	**SFBK** 1–0 ^{OT}	13
October 30	7:30 p.m.	LIU Brooklyn	**Fairleigh Dickinson**	FDU Stadium • Teaneck, NJ	**T** 1–1 ^{2OT}	110
November 1	3:00 p.m.	Sacred Heart	Columbia	Rocco B. Commisso Soccer Stadium • New York, NY	**L** 0–3	179
November 3	1:00 p.m.	Fairleigh Dickinson	**Sacred Heart**	Campus Field • Fairfield, CT	**FDU** 3–0	220
November 3	1:00 p.m.	Robert Morris	**Saint Francis (PA)**	Stokes Soccerplex • Loretto, PA	**SFPA** 4–1	150
November 3	1:00 p.m.	Central Connecticut	**Bryant**	Bulldog Stadium • Smithfield, RI	**T** 0–0 ^{2OT}	232
November 3	1:00 p.m.	St. Francis Brooklyn	**LIU Brooklyn**	LIU Field • Brooklyn, NY; Battle of Brooklyn Game	**SFBK** 2–1 ^{OT}	245

Players of the week:

Offensive		Rookie	
Player	Team	Player	Team
Nadim Saqui	St. Francis Brooklyn	Lucas Rosa	Saint Francis (PA)
Reference: Northeast Conference

=== Rankings ===
==== NSCAA national ====
Legend
Increase in ranking
Decrease in ranking
Not ranked previous week

	Pre	Wk 1	Wk 2	Wk 3	Wk 4	Wk 5	Wk 6	Wk 7	Wk 8	Wk 9	Wk 10	Wk 11	Wk 12	Final
Bryant														
Central Connecticut														
Fairleigh Dickinson			RV	21	21		RV							
LIU Brooklyn														
Robert Morris														
Sacred Heart														
St. Francis Brooklyn														
Saint Francis (PA)														

==== NSCAA northeast region ====
	Wk 1	Wk 2	Wk 3	Wk 4	Wk 5	Wk 6	Wk 7	Wk 8	Wk 9	Wk 10	Wk 11	Wk 12
Bryant												
Central Connecticut												
Fairleigh Dickinson		3	1	1	4	2	8	6	8	7	7	7
LIU Brooklyn												
Robert Morris												
Sacred Heart												
St. Francis Brooklyn		8	7	7	9	8	6	7	5	5	4	2
Saint Francis (PA)	12	6	8	5	6	7	9	9	10	10		

=== NEC play results ===
Legend
Win
Lose
Tie

Team/opponent	BRY	CCS	FDU	LIU	RMU	SHU	SFBK	SFU
Bryant Bulldogs		0–0 (2OT)	2–0	0–1	1–1 (2OT)	2–1 (2OT)	0–1 (OT)	0–1 (2OT)
Central Connecticut Blue Devils	0–0 (2OT)		1–1 (2OT)	2–3 (2OT)	0–1	1–0	0–1	5–3
Fairleigh Dickinson Knights	0–2	1–1 (2OT)		1–1 (2OT)	1–0	3–0	0–1	2–1 (OT)
LIU Brooklyn Blackbirds	1–0	3–2 (2OT)	1–1 (2OT)		0–1	2–0	1–2 (OT)	2–1
Robert Morris Colonials	1–1 (2OT)	1–0	0–1	1–0		1–0 (OT	1–3	1–4
Sacred Heart Pioneers	1–2 (2OT)	0–1	0–3	0–2	0–1 (OT)		0–0 (2OT)	0–2
St. Francis Brooklyn Terriers	1–0 (OT)	1–0	1–0	2–1 (OT)	3–1	0–0 (2OT)		1–0
Saint Francis Red Flash	1–0 (2OT)	3–5	1–2 (OT)	1–2	4–1	2–0	0–1	

=== All-NEC awards and teams ===
**2017 NEC Men's Soccer Individual Awards**
Award	Recipient(s)
Player of the Year	Rasmus Hansen, LIU
Coach of the Year	Tom Giovatto, SFBK
Defensive Player of the Year	Faouzi Taieb, SFBK
Rookie of the Year	Jacob Labovitz, FDU

**2017 NEC Men's Soccer All-Conference Teams**
First Team	Second Team	Rookie Team
Mario Mastrangelo, Jr., FW, SFU; Bayley Winkle, Sr., FW, RMU; Andres Muriel Albino, So., MD, CCSU; Rasmus Hansen, Jr., MD, LIU; Troye Kiernan, Sr., MD, SFU; Dominick Falanga, Sr., MD, SFBK; Ahu Obhakhan, R-Jr., MD, FDU; Collyns Laokandi, Sr., DF, SFBK; Filip Nordstrom, Jr., DF, LIU; Faouzi Taieb, So., DF, SFBK; Robert Bazzichetto, Sr., GK, SFBK	Louis Beddouri, Jr., FW, CCSU; Jacob Lebovitz, Fr., FW, FDU; Naeem Charles, R-Sr., MD, LIU; Federico Curbelo, Sr., MD, SFBK; Daniel Lasarte, R-So., MD, FDU; Keane McIvor, Sr., MD, RMU; Ryan Taylor, Sr., MD, CCSU; Leo Folla, Sr., DF, SFBK; Kaelon Fox, Sr., DF, SFU; Jaime Leddy, Sr., DF, FDU; Nick Stewart, Sr., GK, BRY	Matteo Caribotti, So., FW, SFBK; Jacob Labovitz, Fr., FW, FDU; Ali Tounkara, JR., FW, SFBK; Sean Gannon, Fr., MF, CCSU; Sami Gliguem, Jr., MF, SFBK; Lucas Rosa, Fr., MF, SFU; Erik Johansson, Fr., DF, LIU; Filippo Pirola Fr., DF, CCSU; Anthony Sciola, Fr., GK, LIU; Jahmali Waite, Fr., GK, FDU

== Postseason ==
=== NEC tournament ===
Semifinals; November 11, 2017
1	St. Francis Brooklyn	3
4	Robert Morris	0
2	LIU Brooklyn	4
3	Fairleigh Dickinson	0

Final; November 13, 2017
1	St. Francis Brooklyn	5
2	LIU Brooklyn	0

=== NCAA tournament ===
Seed	Region	School	1st round	2nd round	3rd round	Quarterfinals	Semifinals	Championship
	3	St. Francis Brooklyn	L,2–3 vs. Fordham					

== See also ==
- 2017 NCAA Division I men's soccer season
- 2017 Northeast Conference Men's Soccer tournament
- 2017 Northeast Conference women's soccer season
