= 2019 Northeast Conference men's soccer season =

- League: NCAA Division I
- Sport: Soccer
- Duration: August 30, 2019 – November 10, 2019
- Teams: 10

Regular season
- Season champions: Merrimack Warriors 1st
- Season MVP: Lucas Rosa SFPA

NEC tournament
- Champions: Fairleigh Dickinson 8th
- Runners-up: LIU
- Finals MVP: Jahmali Waite FDU

NEC men's soccer seasons
- ← 2018 2020 →

2019 Northeast Conference men's soccer standings
	Conf.					Overall
Team	W		L		T	W		L		T
Merrimack ^{#}	9	–	0	–	0	11	–	3	–	2
Saint Francis (PA)	7	–	2	–	0	10	–	6	–	0
LIU	6	–	2	–	1	10	–	7	–	2
Bryant	5	–	4	–	0	8	–	8	–	0
Fairleigh Dickinson ‡	3	–	4	–	2	8	–	9	–	3
St. Francis Brooklyn	3	–	5	–	1	7	–	6	–	2
Robert Morris	3	–	5	–	1	4	–	11	–	2
Mount St. Mary's	3	–	6	–	0	7	–	10	–	0
Sacred Heart	1	–	5	–	3	2	–	11	–	3
Central Connecticut	1	–	8	–	0	1	–	13	–	1
‡ – 2019 NEC Tournament champion + – Invited to the 2019 NCAA tournament ^{#} – Ineligible for post-season (In transition); As of 22 November 2019; Rankings from United Soccer Coaches

The 2019 Northeast Conference men's soccer season was the 39th season of men's varsity soccer in the conference.

The defending regular-season and tournament champion, LIU Brooklyn, was replaced by the unified LIU athletic program during the 2019 preseason (see below).

With one week left on the season, Merrimack clinched the regular season championship with an 8–0–0 record. Due to their reclassification, they could not compete in the NEC tournament.

== Changes from 2018 ==
Merrimack College joined the Northeast Conference from Division II Northeast-10 Conference. They are not eligible this year for the NEC tournament.

On October 3, 2018 Long Island University announced that it would combine its two existing athletic programs—NEC member LIU Brooklyn and the Division II program at LIU Post—into a single Division I program under the LIU name. The new LIU program, named the LIU Sharks, maintains LIU Brooklyn's prior memberships in Division I and the NEC. The unified men's soccer program is now based at the LIU Post campus in the Nassau County community of Brookville, New York.

== Teams ==
Team	Location	Stadium	Capacity	Head coach	Seasons at school	Record at school
Bryant Bulldogs	Smithfield, Rhode Island	Bulldog Stadium	5,500	Seamus Purcell	22	139–203–41
Central Connecticut Blue Devils	New Britain, Connecticut	CCSU Soccer Field	550	Shaun Green	34	275–283–66
Fairleigh Dickinson Knights	Florham Park, New Jersey	FDU Stadium	500	Seth Roland	22	205–165–56
LIU Sharks	Brookville, New York	LIU Soccer Park	200	Michael Mordocco	1 (LIU Post); 0 (LIU)	14–5–1 (LIU Post); 0–0–0 (LIU)
Merrimack	North Andover, Massachusetts	Martone-Mejail Field	3,000	Tony Martone	38 (Div. II); 0 (Div. I)	392–277–53 (Div. II); 0–0–0 (Div. I)
Mount St. Mary's	Emmitsburg, Maryland	Waldron Family Stadium	1,000	Bryan Cunningham	1	5–9–3
Robert Morris Colonials	Moon Township, Pennsylvania	North Athletic Complex	800	Bill Denniston	22	152–229–48
Sacred Heart Pioneers	Fairfield, Connecticut	Campus Field	3,334	Joe Barroso	14	87–137–24
St. Francis Brooklyn Terriers	Brooklyn, New York	Brooklyn Bridge Park, Pier 5	300	Tom Giovatto	12	123–79–30
Saint Francis Red Flash	Loretto, Pennsylvania	DeGol Field	500	Frank Olszewski	0	0–0–0

Notes:

- All records, appearances, titles, etc. are from time with current school only, except for LIU.
- Records for LIU Post included in the LIU listing because Post's final head coach was named head coach of the newly unified LIU program.
- Years at school does not includes current season.
- Overall and NEC records are from time at current school and are before the beginning of the season.

== Preseason ==
=== Rankings ===
LIU, the reigning NEC Champions, were not picked as favorites to this year. This is due to LIU losing six players from last year and the program starting with a new head coach. Saint Francis (PA) finished in second place last year and received the most first place votes. Second was St. Francis Brooklyn, which did not do well last year – missing the playoffs for the first time since 2012, but the Terriers are perennial winners in the NEC, having captured the most championships in conference history.

	NEC Coaches Poll
1.	Saint Francis Red Flash (5)
2.	St. Francis Brooklyn Terriers (3)
3.	Fairleigh Dickinson Knights
4.	Bryant Bulldogs
5.	LIU Sharks (2)
6.	Robert Morris Colonials
7.	Mount St. Mary's Mountaineers
8.	Sacred Heat Pioneers
9.	Central Connecticut Blue Devils
10	Merrimack Warriors

() first place votes

== Regular season ==
The biggest upset of the season was accomplished by Fairleigh Dickinson as they defeated #23 UConn on the road 2–1. The largest margin of defeat was 0–7, as Sacred Heart lost to NJIT in their season opener. The largest margin of victory was 6–0, as Merrimack defeated Robert Morris at home. One of the season's best goals made ESPN SportsCenter's Top 10 list, a bicycle kick goal by St. Francis Brooklyn Terrier's El Mahdi Youssoufi against Central Connecticut was ranked 7th. With one week left on the season, Merrimack clinched the regular season championship with an 8–0–0 record. Due to their reclassification, they could not compete in the NEC tournament.

Index to colors and formatting
NEC member won
NEC member lost
NEC member tied
NEC teams in **bold**

Notes: All times Eastern Standard time and national ranking is from United Soccer Coaches (USC) poll.

=== Week 1 (Aug 26–Sep 1) ===
Schedule and results:

Date	Time (ET)	Visiting team	Home team	Site	Result	Attendance
August 30	4:00 p.m.	Stony Brook	**St. Francis Brooklyn**	Brooklyn Bridge Park • Brooklyn, NY	**W** 0–1	0
August 30	4:00 p.m.	Oakland	**Robert Morris**	North Athletic Complex • Moon Township, PA	**L** 5–1	0
August 30	4:00 p.m.	NJIT	**Sacred Heart**	Campus Field • Fairfield, CT	**L** 7–0	135
August 30	6:00 p.m.	**Central Connecticut**	Seton Hall	Owen T. Carroll Field • South Orange, NJ	**L** 0–6	173
August 30	7:00 p.m.	**Fairleigh Dickinson**	Bucknell	Emmitt Field at Holmes Stadium • Lewisburg, PA	**W** 2–1	580
August 30	7:00 p.m.	**LIU**	Old Dominion	Old Dominion Soccer Complex • Norfolk, VA	**W** 2–1	351
August 30	7:30 p.m.	**Bryant**	UC Riverside	UC Riverside Soccer Stadium • Riverside, CA	**L** 0–1	136
September 1	1:00 p.m.	Winthrop	**Mount St. Mary's**	Waldron Family Stadium • Emmitsburg, MD	**W** 3–4	269
September 1	1:00 p.m.	Bowling Green	**Robert Morris**	North Athletic Complex • Moon Township, PA	**L** 2–0	0
September 1	2:00 p.m.	Siena	**Saint Francis (PA)**	DeGol Field • Loretto, PA	**L** 4–2	175
September 1	10:00 p.m.	**Bryant**	Cal State Fullerton	Titan Stadium • Riverside, CA	**L** 1–2	0

NEC weekly awards

Player of the Week			Rookie of the Week		
Player	Position	Team	Player	Position	Team
Chris Capaldo	MF	LIU	Callum James	GK	SFBK
Reference: Northeast Conference

=== Week 2 (Sep 2–8) ===
Schedule and results:

Date	Time (ET)	Visiting team	Home team	Site	Result	Attendance
September 2	5:00 p.m.	**Merrimack**	Northeastern	Parsons Field • Brookline, MA	**W** 2–1	214
September 2	4:00 p.m.	**Sacred Heart**	UMass	Rudd Field • Amherst, MA	**L** 4–0	305
September 2	7:00 p.m.	**LIU**	VCU	Sports Backers Stadium • Richmond, VA	**W** 1–0	449
September 3	4:00 p.m.	La Salle	**St. Francis Brooklyn**	Brooklyn Bridge Park • Brooklyn, NY	**W** 0–3	307
September 3	7:00 p.m.	**Fairleigh Dickinson**	Lafayette	Oaks Stadium • Easton, PA	**L** 0–1	100
September 4	7:00 p.m.	**Central Connecticut**	Rider	Ben Cohen Field • Lawrenceville, NJ	**Cancelled**	
September 4	7:00 p.m.	**Robert Morris**	Cleveland State	Krenzler Field • Cleveland, OH	**L** 0–4	212
September 6	8:00 p.m.	**Sacred Heart**	Quinnipiac	Quinnipiac Soccer Stadium • Hamden, CT	**L** 1–2	0
September 6	7:00 p.m.	**Fairleigh Dickinson**	No. 23 UConn	Morrone Stadium • Mansfield, CT	**W** 2–1	533
September 6	7:00 p.m.	**Merrimack**	Georgia Southern	Eagle Field • Statesboro, GA	**Cancelled**	
September 6	7:00 p.m.	**Mount St. Mary's**	Bucknell	Emmitt Field at Holmes Stadium • Lewisburg, PA	**W** 2–1	450
September 6	7:00 p.m.	**Saint Francis (PA)**	VCU	Sports Backers Stadium • Richmond, VA	**Cancelled**	
September 7	1:00 p.m.	Lafayette	**St. Francis Brooklyn**	Brooklyn Bridge Park • Brooklyn, NY	**T** 0–0 ^{2OT}	329
September 7	3:00 p.m.	**Robert Morris**	La Salle	McCarthy Stadium • Philadelphia, PA	**L** 1–3	112
September 7	8:00 p.m.	Saint Joseph's	**LIU**	Hofstra University Soccer Stadium • Hempstead, NY	**L** 1–0	160
September 8	1:00 p.m.	**Bryant**	Siena	Hickey Field • Loudonville, NY	**W** 3–2	742
September 8	1:00 p.m.	Gonzaga	**Fairleigh Dickinson**	FDU Stadium • Teaneck, NJ	**W** 1–3	374
September 8	2:00 p.m.	**Saint Francis (PA)**	Old Dominion	Old Dominion Soccer Complex • Norfolk, VA	**W** 2–0	212

NEC Weekly Awards

Player of the Week			Rookie of the Week		
Player	Position	Team	Player	Position	Team
Diego Arribas	FW	FDU	Felix Tonne	FW	SFPA
Reference: Northeast Conference

=== Week 3 (Sep 9–15) ===
Date	Time (ET)	Visiting team	Home team	Site	Result	Attendance
September 9	7:00 p.m.	**Central Connecticut**	Army	James Clinton Field • West Point, NY	**Cancelled**	
September 10	3:00 p.m.	**Mount St. Mary's**	Howard	Greene Stadium • Washington, DC	**W** 1–0	221
September 10	7:00 pm	**Merrimack**	Boston University	Nickerson Field • Boston, MA	**W** 3–0	200
September 10	7:00 p.m.	**LIU**	LaSalle	McCarthy Stadium • Philadelphia, PA	**L** 0–1	0
September 11	4:00 p.m.	Saint Peter's	**Sacred Heart**	Campus Field • Fairfield, CT	**W** 1–2	0
September 12	4:00 p.m.	California Baptist	**Robert Morris**	North Athletic Complex • Moon Township, PA	**W** 1–2	0
September 13	7:00 p.m.	**Merrimack**	Rhode Island	URI Soccer Complex • Kingston, RI	**L** 1–2	0
September 14	1:00 p.m.	**Sacred Heart**	Providence	Chapey Field • Providence, RI	**L** 0–4	630
September 14	2:00 p.m.	**St. Francis Brooklyn**	Saint Peter's	Joseph J. Jaroschak Field • Jersey City, NJ	**L** 0–1	0
September 14	4:00 p.m.	Wright State	**Saint Francis (PA)**	DeGol Field • Loretto, PA	**L** 1–0	150
September 14	5:00 p.m.	**Fairleigh Dickinson**	Cornell	Charles F. Berman Field • Ithaca, NY	**L** 0–1	0
September 14	6:00 p.m.	UMass	**Central Connecticut**	CCSU Soccer Field • New Britain, CT	**L** 6–0	487
September 14	7:00 p.m.	**LIU**	UMBC	Retriever Soccer Park • Baltimore, MD	**L** 1–5	1,126
September 14	7:00 p.m.	Navy	**Mount St. Mary's**	Waldron Family Stadium • Emmitsburg, MD	**L** 1–0	521
September 15	12:00 p.m.	Howard	**Bryant**	Bulldog Stadium • Smithfield, RI	**L** 3–2	0
September 15	1:00 p.m.	Longwood	**Robert Morris**	North Athletic Complex • Moon Township, PA	**L** 3–0	0

NEC Weekly Awards

Player of the Week			Rookie of the Week		
Player	Position	Team	Player	Position	Team
Jahmali Waite	GK	FDU	Stefano Pesenti	MF	MC
Reference: Northeast Conference

=== Week 4 (Sep 16–22) ===
Date	Time (ET)	Visiting team	Home team	Site	Result	Attendance
September 17	3:00 p.m.	**St. Francis Brooklyn**	Howard	Greene Stadium • Washington, DC	**W** 1–0	97
September 17	3:00 p.m.	UMass	**Bryant**	Bulldog Stadium • Smithfield, RI	**W** 1–2	0
September 17	4:00 p.m.	UMass Lowell	**Merrimack**	Martone-Mejail Field • North Andover, MA	**L** 1–0	0
September 17	6:00 p.m.	Rhode Island	**Central Connecticut**	CCSU Soccer Field • New Britain, CT	**T** 1–1^{2OT}	438
September 17	6:00 p.m.	**Mount St. Mary's**	Army	James Clinton Field • West Point, NY	**L** 0–1	287
September 17	7:00 p.m.	NJIT	**Fairleigh Dickinson**	FDU Stadium • Teaneck, NJ	**W** 1–2	0
September 18	4:00 p.m.	Duquesne	**Robert Morris**	North Athletic Complex • Moon Township, PA	**L** 0–2	0
September 18	4:00 p.m.	Iona	**Sacred Heart**	Campus Field • Fairfield, CT	**L** 2–1	0
September 18	6:00 p.m.	**Saint Francis (PA)**	Bucknell	Emmitt Field at Holmes Stadium • Lewisburg, PA	**L** 0–3	207
September 20	6:00 p.m.	Quinnipiac	**Central Connecticut**	CCSU Soccer Field • New Britain, CT	**L** 4–1	623
September 21	1:00 p.m.	Siena	**Sacred Heart**	Campus Field • Fairfield, CT	**L** 3–0	134
September 21	3:00 p.m.	**LIU**	Iona	Mazzella Field • New Rochelle, NY	**L** 2–3	0
September 21	4:00 p.m.	Rider	**Saint Francis (PA)**	DeGol Field • Loretto, PA	**W** 0–4	0
September 21	7:00 p.m.	**Merrimack**	Vermont	Virtue Field • Burlington, VT	**L** 0–3	550
September 21	7:00 p.m.	Princeton	**Fairleigh Dickinson**	FDU Stadium • Teaneck, NJ	**L** 4–0	338
September 21	7:00 p.m.	**Mount St. Mary's**	James Madison	Sentara Park • Harrisonburg, VA	**L** 0–3	421
September 21	7:30 p.m.	Manhattan	**St. Francis Brooklyn**	Poly Prep Soccer Field • Brooklyn, NY	**W** 1–3	0
September 22	1:00 p.m.	Brown	**Bryant**	Bulldog Stadium • Smithfield, RI	**W** 1–2	0
September 22	1:00 p.m.	Howard	**Robert Morris**	North Athletic Complex • Moon Township, PA	**T** 1–1^{2OT}	0

NEC Weekly Awards

Player of the Week			Co-Rookies of the Week		
Player	Position	Team	Player	Position	Team
Alex DaCosta	FW	BRY	Khaled Abdella	FW	SFBK
Alex DaCosta	FW	BRY	Papa Ndoye	FW	LIU
Reference: Northeast Conference

=== Week 5 (Sep 23–29) ===
Date	Time (ET)	Visiting team	Home team	Site	Result	Attendance
September 23	7:00 p.m.	**LIU**	Columbia	Columbia Soccer Stadium • New York, NY	**W** 3–1	75
September 24	4:00 p.m.	Duquesne	**Saint Francis (PA)**	DeGol Field • Loretto, PA	**W** 1–2	100
September 24	6:00 p.m.	Hartford	**Central Connecticut**	CCSU Soccer Field • New Britain, CT	**L** 2–0	617
September 24	7:00 p.m.	**Merrimack**	Harvard	Jordan Field • Cambridge, MA	**T** 3–3^{2OT}	124
September 27	3:00 p.m.	Merrimack	Sacred Heart	Campus Field • Fairfield, CT	2–0	109
September 27	3:00 p.m.	Saint Francis (PA)	LIU	LIU Soccer Park • Brookville, NY	2–3^{OT}	150
September 27	3:00 p.m.	St. Francis Brooklyn	Central Connecticut	CCSU Soccer Field • New Britain, CT	4–2	438
September 27	3:30 p.m.	Mount St. Mary's	Robert Morris	North Athletic Complex • Moon Township, PA	0–1	78
September 29	1:00 p.m.	Saint Francis (PA)	St. Francis Brooklyn	Brooklyn Bridge Park • Brooklyn, NY	2–1	337
September 29	1:00 p.m.	Sacred Heart	Bryant	Bulldog Stadium• Smithfield, RI	0–2	0
September 29	3:00 p.m.	Fairleigh Dickinson	Robert Morris	North Athletic Complex • Moon Township, PA	0–0^{2OT}	0

NEC Weekly Awards

Player of the Week			Rookie of the Week		
Player	Position	Team	Player	Position	Team
El Mahdi Youssoufi	FW	SFBK	El Mahdi Youssoufi	FW	SFBK
Reference: Northeast Conference

=== Week 6 (Sep 30–Oct 6) ===
Date	Time (ET)	Visiting team	Home team	Site	Result	Attendance
September 30	6:00 p.m.	Yale	**Central Connecticut**	CCSU Soccer Field • New Britain, CT	**L** 4–0	362
October 1	4:00 p.m.	**Merrimack**	Boston College	Newton Soccer Complex • Newton, MA	**T** 0–0^{2OT}	181
October 1	7:00 p.m.	**LIU**	Hofstra	Hofstra University Soccer Stadium • Hempstead, NY	**L** 1–2	779
October 2	7:00 p.m.	Iona	**Fairleigh Dickinson**	FDU Stadium • Teaneck, NJ	**L** 2–1	319
October 4	1:00 p.m.	Robert Morris	Merrimack	Martone-Mejail Field • North Andover, MA	0–6	0
October 4	3:00 p.m.	Central Connecticut	Bryant	Bulldog Stadium • Smithfield, RI	0–4	0
October 6	11:00 a.m.	Robert Morris	Central Connecticut	CCSU Soccer Field • New Britain, CT	3–1	227
October 6	1:00 p.m.	St. Francis Brooklyn	Mount St. Mary's	Waldron Family Stadium • Emmitsburg, MD	1–2^{OT}	0
October 6	2:00 p.m.	Fairleigh Dickinson	Saint Francis (PA)	DeGol Field • Loretto, PA	1–3	100
October 6	3:00 p.m.	LIU	Sacred Heart	Campus Field • Fairfield, CT	0–0^{2OT}	111

NEC Weekly Awards

Player of the Week			Rookie of the Week		
Player	Position	Team	Player	Position	Team
Tola Showunmi	FW	MC	Jake Spaulding	FW	BC
Reference: Northeast Conference

=== Week 7 (Oct 7–Oct 13) ===
Date	Time (ET)	Visiting team	Home team	Site	Result	Attendance
October 8	7:00 p.m.	Loyola	**Mount St. Mary's**	Waldron Family Stadium • Emmitsburg, MD	**L** 4–2	209
October 11	3:00 p.m.	Fairleigh Dickinson	Sacred Heart	Campus Field • Fairfield, CT	0–0^{2OT}	97
October 11	3:00 p.m.	Merrimack	LIU	LIU Soccer Park • Brookville, NY	2–1	65
October 11	3:30 p.m.	Bryant	Robert Morris	North Athletic Complex • Moon Township, PA	2–1	0
October 11	7:00 p.m.	Central Connecticut	Mount St. Mary's	Waldron Family Stadium • Emmitsburg, MD	2–3	244
October 13	12:00 p.m.	Bryant	St. Francis (PA)	DeGol Field • Loretto, PA	1–3	120
October 13	1:00 p.m.	Merrimack	St. Francis Brooklyn	Brooklyn Bridge Park • Brooklyn, NY	1–0	387
October 13	6:00 p.m.	Central Connecticut	Fairleigh Dickinson	FDU Stadium• Teaneck, NJ	1–5	347

NEC Weekly Awards

Player of the Week			Rookie of the Week		
Player	Position	Team	Player	Position	Team
Alex DaCosta (2)	FW	BC	Felix Tonne (2)	FW	SFPA
Reference: Northeast Conference

=== Week 8 (Oct 14–Oct 20) ===
Date	Time (ET)	Visiting team	Home team	Site	Result	Attendance
October 15	7:00 p.m.	American	**Mount St. Mary's**	Waldron Family Stadium • Emmitsburg, MD	**W** 1–4	169
October 18	3:00 p.m.	Saint Francis (PA)	Central Connecticut	CCSU Soccer Field • New Britain, CT	3–1	0
October 18	3:00 p.m.	Mount St. Mary's	Sacred Heart	Campus Field • Fairfield, CT	1–3	0
October 18	7:00 p.m.	Bryant	St. Francis Brooklyn	Poly Prep Soccer Field • Brooklyn, NY	0–3	329
October 18	7:00 p.m.	LIU	Fairleigh Dickinson	FDU Stadium • Teaneck, NJ	1–0	330
October 20	1:00 p.m.	Robert Morris	St. Francis Brooklyn	Poly Prep Soccer Field • Brooklyn, NY	0–5	322
October 20	3:00 p.m.	Saint Francis (PA)	Merrimack	Martone-Mejail Field • North Andover, MA	0–1	319

NEC Weekly Awards

Player of the Week			Rookie of the Week		
Player	Position	Team	Player	Position	Team
Segundo Navarro	FW	SHU	Callum James (2)	GK	SFBK
Reference: Northeast Conference

=== Week 9 (Oct 21–Oct 27) ===
Date	Time (ET)	Visiting team	Home team	Site	Result	Attendance
October 25	3:00 p.m.	Mount St. Mary's	Bryant	Bulldog Stadium • Smithfield, RI	0–2	0
October 25	3:00 p.m.	Sacred Heart	Robert Morris	North Athletic Complex • Moon Township, PA	1–5	0
October 25	3:30 p.m.	LIU	Central Connecticut	CCSU Soccer Field • New Britain, CT	3–1	213
October 26	7:00 p.m.	St. Francis Brooklyn	Fairleigh Dickinson	FDU Stadium • Teaneck, NJ	3–4^{OT}	381
October 27	1:30 p.m.	Mount St. Mary's	Merrimack	Martone-Mejail Field • North Andover, MA	0–3	243
October 27	2:00 p.m.	Sacred Heart	Saint Francis (PA)	DeGol Field • Loretto, PA	0–1	150

NEC Weekly Awards

Player of the Week			Rookies of the Week		
Player	Position	Team	Player	Position	Team
Diego Arribas (2)	FW	FDU	Papa Ndoye (2)	FW	LIU
Diego Arribas (2)	FW	FDU	Ville Ahola	MF	FDU
Reference: Northeast Conference

=== Week 10 (Oct 28–Nov 3) ===
Date	Time (ET)	Visiting team	Home team	Site	Result	Attendance
October 28	1:00 p.m.	Bryant	LIU	LIU Soccer Park • Brookville, NY	0–2	106
November 1	3:00 p.m.	Fairleigh Dickinson	Bryant	Bulldog Stadium • Smithfield, RI	0–1	250
November 1	3:00 p.m.	LIU	Robert Morris	North Athletic Complex • Moon Township, PA	3–0	0
November 1	6:00 p.m.	Merrimack	Central Connecticut	CCSU Soccer Field • New Britain, CT	6–0	223
November 1	7:00 p.m.	Saint Francis (PA)	Mount St. Mary's	Waldron Family Stadium • Emmitsburg, MD	1–0^{2OT}	213
November 2	1:00 p.m.	Sacred Heart	St. Francis Brooklyn	Poly Prep Soccer Field • Brooklyn, NY	1–1^{2OT}	321
November 3	1:00 p.m.	LIU	Mount St. Mary's	Waldron Family Stadium • Emmitsburg, PA	0–1	214
November 3	3:00 p.m.	Fairleigh Dickinson	Merrimack	Martone-Mejail Field • North Andover, MA	1–2^{2OT}	401

NEC Weekly Awards

Player of the Week			Rookie of the Week		
Player	Position	Team	Player	Position	Team
Lucas Rosa	MF	SFPA	Peter Kozlej	MF	FDU
Reference: Northeast Conference

=== Week 11 (Nov 4–Nov 10) ===
Date	Time (ET)	Visiting team	Home team	Site	Result	Attendance
November 10	1:00 p.m.	St. Francis Brooklyn	LIU	LIU Soccer Park • Brookville, NY	0–3	110
November 10	1:00 p.m.	Central Connecticut	Sacred Heart	Campus Field • Fairfield, CT	3–2^{OT}	0
November 10	1:00 p.m.	Mount St. Mary's	Fairleigh Dickinson	FDU Stadium • Teaneck, NJ	0–5	220
November 10	1:00 p.m.	Robert Morris	Saint Francis (PA)	DeGol Field • Loretto, PA	0–3	125
November 10	2:00 p.m.	Bryant	Merrimack	Martone-Mejail Field • North Andover, MA	0–2	481

NEC Weekly Awards

Co-Players of the Week			Rookie of the Week		
Player	Position	Team	Player	Position	Team
Diego Arribas (3)	FW	FDU	Ville Ahola (2)	MF	FDU
Eddie Yeppes	MF	CCSU	Ville Ahola (2)	MF	FDU
Reference: Northeast Conference

=== Against other conferences ===
**Regular season**

**NEC versus other conferences**
Conference	Outcome
America East	2–4–0
American Athletic Conference	**1–0–0**
Atlantic Coast Conference	0–0–1
Atlantic Sun Conference	1–1–0
Atlantic 10 Conference	4–7–1
Big East Conference	0–2–0
Big South Conference	1–1–0
Big West Conference	0–2–0
Colonial Athletic Association	1–2–0
Conference USA	**2–0–0**
Horizon League	0–3–0
Ivy League	2–3–1
Metro Atlantic Athletic Conference	3–8–0
Mid-American Conference	0–1–0
Patriot League	4–5–1
Sun Belt Conference	**2–1–1**
West Coast Conference	**1–0–0**
Western Athletic Conference	**1–0–0**
**Total**	25–40–5
As of October 16, 2019

**Post Season**

**NEC versus other conferences**
Conference	Outcome
America East	0–1–0
As of November 22, 2019

=== Results ===
Legend
Win
Lose
Tie

	Opponent									
Team	BRY	CCSU	FDU	LIU	MC	MSM	RMU	SHU	SFBK	SFU
Bryant Bulldogs		4–0	1–0	0–2	0–2	2–0	2–1	2–0	0–3	1–3
Central Connecticut Blue Devils	0–4		1–5	1–3	0–6	2–3	1–3	3–2^{OT}	2–4	1–3
Fairleigh Dickinson Knights	0–1	5–1		0–1	1–2^{2OT}	5–0	0–0^{2OT}	0–0^{2OT}	4–3^{OT}	1–3
LIU Sharks	2–0	3–1	1–0		1–2	0–1	3–0	0–0^{2OT}	3–0	3–2^{OT}
Merrimack Warriors	2–0	6–0	2–1^{2OT}	2–1		3–0	6–0	2–0	1–0	1–0
Mount St. Mary's	0–2	3–2	0–5	1–0	0–3		0–1	1–3	2–1^{OT}	0–1^{2OT}
Robert Morris Colonials	1–2	3–1	0–0^{2OT}	0–3	0–6	1–0		5–1	0–5	0–3
Sacred Heart Pioneers	0–2	2–3^{OT}	0–0^{2OT}	0–0^{2OT}	0–2	3–1	1–5		1–1^{2OT}	0–1
St. Francis Brooklyn Terriers	3–0	4–2	3–4^{OT}	0–3	0–1	1–2^{OT}	5–0	1–1^{2OT}		1–2
Saint Francis Red Flash	3–1	3–1	3–1	2–3^{OT}	0–1	1–0^{2OT}	3–0	1–0	2–1	

=== All-NEC awards and teams ===
**2019 NEC Men's Soccer Individual Awards**
Award	Recipient(s)
Player of the Year	Lucas Rosa, SFPA
Coach of the Year	Tony Martone, MC
Defensive Player of the Year	Mirko Nufi, MC
Rookie of the Year	Papa Ndoye, LIU

**2019 NEC Men's Soccer All-Conference Teams**
First Team	Second Team	Rookie Team
Diego Arribas, FDU; Papa Ndoye, LIU; Alex DaCosta, BRY; Lucas Rosa, SFPA; Tola Showunmi, MC; Marc Torrellas, MC; Eddie Yepes, CCSU; Yoann Assoumin, SFBK; Boris Nana Tonzi, MSM; Mirko Nufi, MC; Lucas Rezende, MC	Segundo Navarro, SHU; El Mahdi Youssoufi, SFBK; Matt Cillo, RMU; Daniel Lasarte, FDU; Miguel Lucero, MSM; Julien Remiti, SFBK; Anthony Herbert, FDU; Brandon Ott, SFPA; Kyle Parish, LIU; Piet Wesling, SFPA; Jahmali Waite, FDU	Ville Ahola, FDU; Matt Jones, SFPA; Papa Ndoye, LIU; Alessandro Negri, MC; Stefano Pesenti, MC; Yoann Toko, SHU; Felix Tonne, SFPA; Marc Torrellas, MC; Keanu Tuart, LIU; Piet Wesling, SFPA; El Mahdi Youssoufi, SFBK

== Rankings ==
=== National ===
Legend
	Increase in ranking
	Decrease in ranking
RV	Received votes, but not ranked in Top 25

		PRE	Wk 1	Wk 2	Wk 3	Wk 4	Wk 5	Wk 6	Wk 7	Wk 8	Wk 9	Wk 10	Wk 11	Wk 12	Wk 13	Wk 14	Wk 15	Wk 16	Final
Bryant	USC														None released				
Bryant	TDS																		
Central Connecticut	USC														None released				
Central Connecticut	TDS																		
Fairleigh Dickinson	USC			RV (1)											None released				
Fairleigh Dickinson	TDS																		
LIU	USC		RV (4)												None released				
LIU	TDS																		
Merrimack	USC														None released				
Merrimack	TDS																		
Mount St. Mary's	USC		RV (18)	RV (19)						RV (34)					None released				
Mount St. Mary's	TDS																		
Robert Morris	USC														None released				
Robert Morris	TDS																		
Sacred Heart	USC														None released				
Sacred Heart	TDS																		
St. Francis Brooklyn	USC														None released				
St. Francis Brooklyn	TDS																		
Saint Francis (PA)	USC														None released				
Saint Francis (PA)	TDS																		

=== Regional Ranking - Northeast United Soccer Coaches ===
	Wk 1	Wk 2	Wk 3	Wk 4	Wk 5	Wk 6	Wk 7	Wk 8	Wk 9	Wk 10	Wk 11	Wk 12
Bryant												
Central Connecticut												
Fairleigh Dickinson	7	2	5		10							
LIU	3	5										
Merrimack								10	8	8	8	8
Mount St. Mary's		7	8									
Robert Morris												
Sacred Heart												
St. Francis Brooklyn	9	4	10	7	7							
Saint Francis (PA)							10		10	9	9	10

== Postseason ==
=== NEC tournament ===
Semifinals; November 15, 2019
1	Saint Francis (PA)	0
4	Fairleigh Dickinson^{*}	0
2	LIU	4
3	Bryant	0

Final; November 17, 2019
2	LIU	1
4	Fairleigh Dickinson^{#}	1

- ^{*} After 2OT, FDU defeated SFPA in penalty kicks 3–1
- ^{#} After 2OT, FDU defeated LIU in penalty kicks 3–2

=== NCAA tournament ===
Seed	Region	School	1st round	2nd round	3rd round	Quarterfinals	Semifinals	Championship
	4	Fairleigh Dickinson	L, 0–1 vs. #16 New Hampshire					

== See also ==
- 2019 NCAA Division I men's soccer season
- 2019 Northeast Conference Men's Soccer tournament
