= Northeast Conference Men's Soccer Coach of the Year =

Soccer award

NEC Men's Soccer Coach of the Year
- Awarded for: the most outstanding men's soccer head coach in the Northeast Conference
- Country: United States
- First award: 1986; 40 years ago
- Currently held by: Nate Bell; LIU

The Northeast Conference Men's Soccer Coach of the Year is an American soccer award given to head coaches in the Northeast Conference (NEC). The award is granted to the head coach voted to be the most successful that season by the league's coaches.

The award was first given following the 1986 season, the sixth year of the conference's existence, to Bill Sento of Loyola (MD). St. Francis Brooklyn and Monmouth, which is no longer a member of the NEC, are the programs that have been awarded the most, each with five.

Jaymee Highcock of Fairleigh Dickinson is the current title holder, after having won the 10th NEC tournament title for the University.

== Winners ==
Season	Coach	School	Conf. rec.	Conf. stan.	Overall	Postseason	Ref.
1986	Bill Sento	Loyola (MD)	5-0-1	2nd	17-1-4		
1987	Bill Sento (2)	Loyola (MD)	5-1-0	1st	17-4-2		
1988	Joe Donahue	Monmouth	3-1-1	T-2nd	12-5-2		
1989	Ben Stravato	Fairleigh Dickinson	5-2-0	2nd	17-4-0	NEC Champion	
1990	Jim Deegan	Mount St. Mary's	3-2-2	4th	12-5-3	NEC Semifinals	
1991	Sam Carrington	St. Francis (NY)	6-1-0	1st	14-4-2	NEC Champions	
1992	John Kowalski	Robert Morris	6-1-1	1st	11-8-2	NEC Semifinals	
1993	Bill Furjanic	Saint Francis (PA)	4-3-1	5th	7-10-1		
1994	Mark Mettrick	Mount St. Mary's	5-2-1	3rd	11-6-2	NEC Championship Game	
1995	John Kowalski (2)	Robert Morris	8-0-0	1st	14-4-0	NEC Semifinals	
1996	Mark Mettrick (2)	Mount St. Mary's	5-3-0	4th	10-8-1	NEC Semifinals	
1997	Sam Carrington (2)	St. Francis (NY)	5-1-0	1st	14-6-1	NEC Semifinals	
1998	Sam Carrington (3)	St. Francis (NY)	7-1-1	T-1st	15-6-1	NEC Champions; NCAA Play-In	
1999	Pete Caringi	UMBC	9-0-1	1st	19-1-2	NEC Champions; NCAA First Round	
2000	Seth Roland	Fairleigh Dickinson	8-2-0	1st	13-8-1	NEC Champions; NCAA Play-In	
2001	Bill Denniston	Robert Morris	8-2	T-1st	9-9-1	NEC Semifinals	
2002	Pete Caringi (2)	UMBC	8-1-1	T-1st	11-7-2	NEC Semifinals	
2003	Shaun Green	Central Connecticut	6-0-3	2nd	11-3-4	NEC Championship Game	
2004	B.J. Craig	Saint Francis (PA)	6-2-1	T-2nd	10-6-3	NEC Semifinals	
2005	Rob McCourt	Monmouth	6-0-3	1st	10-4-6	NEC Championship Game	
2006	Rob McCourt (2)	Monmouth	7-0-2	1st	14-4-3	NEC Champions; NCAA First Round	
2007	Rob McCourt (3)	Monmouth	7-2	1st	12-5-2	NEC Semifinals	
2008	Rob Ryerson	Mount St. Mary's	5-4	4th	9-10-1	NEC Championship Game	
2009	Rob McCourt (4)	Monmouth	8-1-1	1st	18-2-2	NEC Champions; NCAA Second Round	
2010	Joe Barroso	Sacred Heart	6-2-2	2nd	11-6-2	NEC Semifinals	
2011	Shaun Green (2)	Central Connecticut	7-3-0	4th	10-8-1	NEC Semifinals	
2012	Eric Da Costa	Quinnipiac	8-1-1	1st	10-5-3	NEC Semifinals	
2013	Shaun Green (3)	Central Connecticut	6–1–0	1st	9–9–1	NEC Semifinals	
2014	Michael Casper	Saint Francis (PA)	6–1	1st	13–6–1	NEC Championship Game	
2015	TJ Kostecky	LIU Brooklyn	7–0–0	1st	11–6–4	NEC Champions; NCAA First Round	
2016	Tom Giovatto	St. Francis Brooklyn	6–0–1	1st	12–5–3	NEC Champions	
2017	Tom Giovatto (2)	St. Francis Brooklyn	6–0–1	1st	13–4–1	NEC Champions	
2018	TJ Kostecky	LIU Brooklyn	6–2–0	1st	13–6–1	NEC Champions	
2019	Tony Martone	Merrimack	9–0–0	1st	11–3–2	– (Note: Could not participate because of Division II reclassification.)	
2020	Tom Giovatto (3)	St. Francis Brooklyn	5–1–1	1st	7–2–1	NEC Champions; NCAA Second Round	
2021	Tom Giovatto (4)	St. Francis Brooklyn	7–2–0	T–1st	12–5–4	NEC Championship Game	
2022	Seth Roland (2)	Fairleigh Dickinson	6–0–2	1st	10–5–3	NEC Championship; NCAA First Round	
2023	Mads Kaiser	Saint Francis (PA)	5–0–3	1st	7–0–8	NEC Semifinals; NCAA First Round	
2024	Austin Solomon	Mercyhurst	5–1–2	1st	8–7–2	–	
2025	Jaymee Highcock	Fairleigh Dickinson	7–1–1	1st	13–5–3	NEC Champions; NCAA First Round	
2026	Nate Bell	LIU	6–1–1	1st	6–7–1	TBD	

== Winners by school ==
key

- school in italics is a former member of the NEC

School	Titles	Winning years
St. Francis Brooklyn	7	1991, 1997, 1998, 2016, 2017, 2020, 2021
Monmouth	5	1988, 2005, 2006, 2007, 2009
Mount St. Mary's	4	1990, 1994, 1996, 2008
Saint Francis (PA)	4	1993, 2004, 2014, 2023
Fairleigh Dickinson	4	1989, 2000, 2022, 2025
Robert Morris	3	1992, 1995, 2001
Central Connecticut	3	2003, 2011, 2013
LIU	3	2015, 2018, 2026
Loyola (MD)	2	1986, 1987
UMBC	2	1999, 2002
Mercyhurst	1	2024
Merrimack	1	2019
Quinnipiac	1	2012
Sacred Heart	1	2010
Bryant	0	—
