= 2016 St. Francis Brooklyn Terriers men's soccer team =

American college soccer season

2016 St. Francis Brooklyn Terriers men's soccer

NEC Regular Season Champions NEC Tournament Champions

NCAA Tournament, First Round
- Conference: Northeast Conference
- Record: 12–5–3 (6–0–1 NEC)
- Head coach: Tom Giovatto (10th season)
- Assistant coaches: Christopher Helms (3rd season); Andy Cormack (2nd season)

2016 Northeast Conference men's soccer standings
	Conf.					Overall
Team	W		L		T	W		L		T
St. Francis Brooklyn ‡	6	–	0	–	1	12	–	6	–	3
Saint Francis (PA)	4	–	1	–	2	12	–	6	–	2
LIU Brooklyn	4	–	2	–	1	10	–	6	–	2
Sacred Heart	3	–	4	–	0	5	–	11	–	2
Bryant	2	–	2	–	3	3	–	10	–	3
Fairleigh Dickinson	1	–	3	–	3	3	–	11	–	3
Robert Morris	1	–	5	–	1	4	–	11	–	2
Central Connecticut	1	–	5	–	1	2	–	12	–	3
‡-Tournament champion + - Invited to the NCAA Division I Men's Soccer Championship; As of 18 November 2016; Rankings from NSCAA

The 2016 St. Francis Brooklyn Terriers men's soccer team represented St. Francis College during the 2016 NCAA Division I men's soccer season. The Terrier's home games were played at Brooklyn Bridge Park, Pier 5. The team has been a member of the Northeast Conference since 1981 and was coached by Tom Giovatto, who was in his tenth year at the helm of the Terriers.

The Terriers ended their season at 12–5–3 overall and 6–0–1 in conference play. The Terriers won the NEC Regular season championship and the Tournament Championship. Of note, the Terriers ended the season seventh in the country in goals against average (0.60) and shutout percentage (0.55).

== Regular season ==
The Terriers opened their season at Lafayette, winning in double-overtime 1–0 on a goal by sophomore Djiby Sarr. Due to his golden goal, Sarr was named NEC Soccer Player of the Week. The Terriers then proceeded to lose three games in a row to Rhode Island, UMass Lowell, and Hartford. The Terriers then tied Hartwick 1–1, defeated NJIT, 2–1, in double overtime and came up with a 1–1 draw versus Army. St. Francis Brooklyn defender Faouzi Taieb scored his first goal as a Terrier in the 66th minute of their 2–1 win over NJIT, and was named the Northeast Conference Rookie of the Week. With a 2–3–2 record, the Terriers then went on to defeat Saint Peter's and Howard. Since going undefeated in their last five games and winning two in a row, the Terriers were ranked 10th in the NSCAA North East Region week 5 rankings. In their last non-conference match-up, the Terriers lost to George Washington to snap their five-game undefeated streak and bring their record to 4–4–2. For their non-conference games the Terriers displayed a clear home-field advantage by posting a 3–1–1 record, while posting a 1–3–1 record on the road.

The Terriers started league play by defeating Sacred Heart on the road 2–0. The Terriers then proceeded to go undefeated through conference play and finished 6–0–1. During their seven-game undefeated streak, the Terriers also shutout every team faced, by not allowing a goal. Going into their last game of the season the Terriers were leading the conference standings and faced a winner-take-all match against LIU Brooklyn, as they did in 2015. If the Terriers lost they would tie LIU Brooklyn in the standings, but LIU would have the tie-breaker in the win. Instead the St. Francis men's soccer team won 1–0 over rival LIU at home, wrapping up the program's first regular-season conference title since 1997. By virtue of the win, the top-seeded Terriers (10–4–3, 6–0–1) will host the conference tournament, opening with a match against No. 4 Sacred Heart on Nov. 11. St. Francis has a shot at its third Northeast Conference title in four years.

After the regular season ended, St. Francis Brooklyn set a program record by having eight different players awarded NEC men's soccer honors. St. Francis Brooklyn claimed three of the four major awards presented by the NEC. Senior defender Collyns Laokandi was named the NEC Defensive Player of the Year and freshman defender Faouzi Taieb collected NEC Rookie of the Year honors. Head coach Tom Giovatto was named the NEC Coach of the Year after leading the Terriers to their first NEC regular season title in 18 years.

== NEC Tournament ==
For the third time in four seasons, the St. Francis Terriers' men's soccer team is returning to the Northeast Conference Championship, thanks to NEC First Team All-Conference forward Salvatore Barone who scored in the 78th minute on an assist by fellow First Teamer Dominick Falanga. The Terriers held on to defeat third seed Sacred Heart at home, 1–0, in the semifinal game. In the championship game, the Terriers won 1–0 against Saint Francis (PA) in double overtime on a Lukas Hauer penalty kick.

== NCAA tournament ==
The Terriers traveled to Hanover, New Hampshire to face the Dartmouth Big Green in the first round of the NCAA Tournament. The Terriers have played against Dartmouth on two other occasions, with the all-time record at 1–1. St. Francis Brooklyn lost in the 104 minute on a golden goal by Dartmouth. Goalie Seth Erdman had a game high eight saves, as he held off the Big Green through the two regulation periods and one overtime period, but gave up the game-winner in double overtime. For the Terriers, it was the first goal they've surrendered in 982 minutes.

== 2016 squad ==
As of August 24, 2016. Note: Flags indicate national team as defined under FIFA eligibility rules; some limited exceptions apply. Players may hold more than one non-FIFA nationality.

No.	Pos.	Nation	Player
0	GK	GUY	Andrew Nestor
1	GK	ITA	Roberto Bazzichetto
2	MF	USA	Leo Folla
3	DF	USA	Dominick Falanga
4	MF	SCO	Kieran Young
5	DF	FRA	Faouzi Taieb
6	MF	FRA	Jules Paillard
7	MF	FRA	Djiby Sarr
8	DF	GER	**Fabian Suele**
10	MF	USA	**Federico Curbelo**
11	FW	USA	Yussuf Olajide
12	DF	FRA	Collyns Laokandi

No.	Pos.	Nation	Player
14	MF	USA	Amir Islami
15	MF	USA	Kiriakos Papanikolaou
17	FW	ALB	Grei Mujko
18	DF	USA	Nicholas Koenig
19	FW	GER	Lukas Hauer
20	FW	ALB	Kledis Capollari
21	FW	GER	Leonard Kirschner
22	MF	USA	Salvatore Barone
23	MF	VEN	Tommy De Andrade
25	DF	SCO	Jack Cook
33	DF	USA	Nadim Saqui
91	GK	USA	Seth Erdman

Captains in bold

== Schedule ==
Date Time, TV	Rank^{#}	Opponent^{#}	Result	Record	Site City, State
Non-conference regular season
August 26, 2016*; 6:00 pm		at Lafayette	W 1–0 ^{2OT}	1–0–0	Oaks Stadium (463); Easton, PA
August 31, 2016*; 7:00 pm		Rhode Island	L 0–1	1–1–0	Brooklyn Bridge Park, Pier 5 (305); Brooklyn, NY
September 4, 2016*; 1:00 pm		at UMass Lowell	L 1–2 ^{2OT}	1–2–0	Cushing Field Complex (236); Lowell, MA
September 7, 2016*; 7:00 pm		at Hartford	L 0–3	1–3–0	Al-Marzook Field (411); West Hartford, CT
September 10, 2016*; 7:30 pm		at Hartwick	T 1–1 ^{2OT}	1–3–1	Elmore Field (452); Oneonta, NY
September 14, 2016*; 7:00 pm		NJIT	W 2–1 ^{2OT}	2–3–1	Brooklyn Bridge Park, Pier 5 (50); Brooklyn, NY
September 18, 2016*; 1:00 pm		Army	T 1–1 ^{2OT}	2–3–2	Brooklyn Bridge Park, Pier 5 (267); Brooklyn, NY
September 21, 2016*; 7:00 pm		Saint Peter's	W 2–1 ^{2OT}	3–3–2	Brooklyn Bridge Park, Pier 5 (107); Brooklyn, NY
September 24, 2016*; 1:00 pm		Howard	W 3–0	4–3–2	Brooklyn Bridge Park, Pier 5 (120); Brooklyn, NY
September 28, 2016*; 12:00 pm		at George Washington	L 1–2	4–4–2	Mount Vernon Athletic Field (51); Washington, DC
Northeast Conference Regular Season
October 7, 2016; 7:00 pm		at Sacred Heart	W 2–0	5–4–2 (1–0–0)	Campus Field (75); Fairfield, CT
October 9, 2016; 1:00 pm		Fairleigh Dickinson	W 3–0	6–4–2 (2–0–0)	Brooklyn Bridge Park, Pier 5 Brooklyn, NY
October 14, 2016; 3:00 pm		at Saint Francis (PA)	W 2–0	7–4–2 (3–0–0)	DeGol Field (199); Loretto, PA
October 16, 2016; 1:00 pm		at Robert Morris	W 2–0	8–4–2 (4–0–0)	North Athletic Complex (49); Moon Township, PA
October 21, 2016; 7:00 pm		Central Connecticut	W 2–0	9–4–2 (5–0–0)	Brooklyn Bridge Park, Pier 5 (215); Brooklyn, NY
October 30, 2016; 1:00 pm		at Bryant	T 0–0 ^{2OT}	9–4–3 (5–0–1)	Bulldog Stadium (100); Smithfield, RI
November 6, 2016; 1:00 pm		LIU Brooklyn; Battle of Brooklyn	W 1–0	10–4–3 (6–0–1)	Brooklyn Bridge Park, Pier 5 (250); Brooklyn, NY
Northeast Conference Tournament
November 11, 2016; 3:00 pm		Sacred Heart; Semifinals	W 1–0	11–4–3	Brooklyn Bridge Park, Pier 5 (418); Brooklyn, NY
November 13, 2016; 1:00 pm		Saint Francis (PA); Finals	W 1–0 ^{2OT}	12–4–3	Brooklyn Bridge Park, Pier 5 (511); Brooklyn, NY
NCAA Division I Men's Soccer Championship
November 17, 2016; 5:00 pm		at Dartmouth; First Round	L 0–1 ^{2OT}	12–5–3	Burnham Field; Hanover, NH
*Non-conference game. ^{#}Rankings from United Soccer Coaches. (#) Tournament seedings in parentheses.

== 2016 NSCAA/Continental Tire College rankings ==
Ranking movement Legend: ██ Improvement in ranking. ██ Decrease in ranking. ██ Not ranked. RV=Others receiving votes.
Poll	Pre	1st	2nd	3rd	4th	5th	6th	7th	8th	9th	10th	11th	12th	Final
National														

Ranking movement Legend: ██ Improvement in ranking. ██ Decrease in ranking. ██ Not ranked. RV=Others receiving votes.
Poll	1st	2nd	3rd	4th	5th	6th	7th	8th	9th	10th	11th	12th
North East Region	8				10		9	4	5	3	3	3

== Awards ==
Djiby Sarr, Sophomore Midfielder

- NEC Player of the Week Award (August 22, 2016 – August 28, 2016)
- Selected to the 2016 NEC All-Rookie Team

Faouzi Taieb, Freshman Defender

- NEC Rookie of the Week Award (September 12, 2016 – September 18, 2016)
- Selected the 2016 NEC Rookie of the Year
- Selected to the 2016 NEC All-Rookie Team

Yussuf Olajide, Senior Forward

- NEC Player of the Week Award (September 19, 2016 – September 25, 2016)
- Selected to the 2016 NEC Second Team All-Conference
- 2016 NSCAA NCAA Division I Men's All-Northeast Region Second Team

Dominick Falanga, Junior Midfielder

- NEC Player of the Week Award (October 3, 2016 – October 9, 2016)
- Selected to the 2016 NEC First Team All-Conference
- 2016 ECAC Division I honorable mention
- 2016 NSCAA NCAA Division I Men's All-Northeast Region Second Team

Salvatore Barone, Senior Midfielder

- NEC Player of the Week Award (October 10, 2016 – October 16, 2016)
- Selected to the 2016 NEC First Team All-Conference
- 2016 NEC Tournament MVP
- 2016 ECAC Division I honorable mention

Collyns Laokandi, Senior Defender

- 2016 NEC Defender of the Year
- Selected to the 2016 NEC First Team All-Conference
- 2016 ECAC Division I Defensive Player of the Year
- 2016 NSCAA NCAA Division I Men's All-Northeast Region First Team

Robert Bazzichetto, Junior Goalkeeper

- Selected to the 2016 NEC First Team All-Conference
- Selected to the 2016 ECAC Division I All-Star Team

Fabian Suele, Senior Midfielder

- Selected to the 2016 NEC Second Team All-Conference

== Season statistics ==
Individual Player Statistics (As of November 18, 2016)
Player	App	Goals	Asst	Points	Shots	Shot%	SOG	SOG%	GW	Pk-Att	GA	Saves	SO
Forwards
Olajide, Yussuf	20	6	0	12	29	21%	12	41%	2	0-0	0	0	0
Mujko, Grei	12	0	0	0	2	0%	1	50%	0	0-0	0	0	0
Kirschner, Leonard	20	2	0	4	16	13%	12	75%	0	0-0	0	0	0
Hauer, Lukas	17	1	0	2	3	33%	3	100%	1	1-1	0	0	0
Capollari, Kledis	3	0	0	0	0	0%	0	0%	0	0-0	0	0	0
Midfielders
Sarr, Djiby	18	1	0	2	26	4%	16	62%	1	0-0	0	0	0
Folla, Leo	18	1	0	2	7	14%	3	43%	0	0-0	0	0	0
Barone, Salvatore	20	5	2	12	32	16%	12	38%	0	1-1	0	0	0
De Andrade, Tommy	18	0	1	1	15	0%	3	20%	0	0-0	0	0	0
Curbello, Federico	20	1	1	3	13	8%	5	38%	0	0-0	0	0	0
Paillard, Jules	15	0	1	1	7	0%	1	14%	0	0-0	0	0	0
Young, Kieran	4	0	0	0	0	0%	0	0%	0	0-0	0	0	0
Islami, Amir	4	1	0	2	1	100%	1	100%	0	0-0	0	0	0
Defenders
Cook, Jack	20	0	0	0	0	0%	0	0%	0	0-0	0	0	0
Laokandi, Collyns	18	2	3	7	19	11%	7	37%	0	0-0	0	0	0
Suele, Fabian	20	1	2	4	11	9%	3	27%	0	0-0	0	0	0
Taieb, Faouzi	19	2	0	4	11	18%	5	45%	0	0-0	0	0	0
Falanga, Dominick	20	3	6	12	24	13%	14	58%	0	0-0	0	0	0
Koenig, Nicholas	2	0	0	0	0	0%	0	0%	0	0-0	0	0	0
Saqui, Nadim	4	0	0	0	0	0%	0	0%	0	0-0	0	0	0
Goalkeepers
Erdman, Seth	13	0	0	0	0	0%	0	0%	0	0-0	10	45	4
Bazzichetto, Roberto	9	0	0	0	0	0%	0	0%	0	0-0	3	26	4
Nestor, Andrew	1	0	0	0	0	0%	0	0%	0	0-0	0	0	0
Team		0	0	0								1	3
Total	20	26	16	68	212	12%	96	45%	4	2-2	13	72	11
Opponents	20	13	10	36	202	6%	85	42%	2	1-3	26	71	4

Legend
App	Appearances	Asst	Assists	Shot%	Shots for Goal Percent
SOG	Shots on Goal	SOG%	Shots on Goal Percent	GW	Game Winning Goals
PK-Att	Penalty Kicks-Attempts	GA	Goals Against	SO	Shut Outs
	Team high

== See also ==
- St. Francis Brooklyn Terriers men's soccer
- 2016 NCAA Division I men's soccer season
- Northeast Conference Men's Soccer Tournament
- 2016 NCAA Division I Men's Soccer Championship
