= Collyns Laokandi =

Chadian footballer (born 1995)

Personal information
- Full name: Collyns Ambassa Laokandi
- Date of birth: 9 October 1995 (age 31)
- Place of birth: N'Djamena, Chad
- Height: 1.93 m (6 ft 4 in)
- Position: Defender

Team information
- Current team: Cormontreuil FC

Youth career
- Reims

College career
Years	Team	Apps	(Gls)
2016–2017	St. Francis Brooklyn Terriers		
2018–2019	Southern New Hampshire Penmen		

Senior career*
Years	Team	Apps	(Gls)
2012–2014	Reims B	7+	(0+)
2014–2015	Prix-lès-Mézières		
2017	New York Red Bulls U-23	6	(0)
2019–	Cormontreuil FC		

International career^{‡}
2019–	Chad	7	(0)
- * Club domestic league appearances and goals ‡ National team caps and goals as of 09:40, 6 June 2021 (UTC)

Collyns Ambassa Laokandi (born 9 October 1995) is a Chadian professional footballer who plays as a defender for Régional 1 club Cormontreuil FC.

== Career ==
Laokandi, who moved to France at the age of eight, started his career with the reserves of French Ligue 1 side Reims. After that, he played college soccer in the United States, where he said "it's completely different from France. Here, it's work, work, work... Because if you don't get good grades, you don't play. You have no choice. In France, there are a lot of individualities, there, everyone plays and defends together. They are very focused on the physical, more than the technique." In 2017, Laokandi signed for American club New York Red Bulls U-23. In 2019, he signed for French amateur club Cormontreuil FC.
