= Salvatore Barone =

American soccer player (born 1995)

Personal information
- Date of birth: December 13, 1995 (age 30)
- Place of birth: Brooklyn, New York, United States
- Height: 5 ft 7 in (1.70 m)
- Position: Midfielder

Team information
- Current team: New Amsterdam
- Number: 22

Youth career
- Brooklyn Italians

College career
Years	Team	Apps	(Gls)
2013–2016	St. Francis Terriers	63	(9)

Senior career*
Years	Team	Apps	(Gls)
2016–2017	Brooklyn Italians	7	(2)
2017	New York Cosmos	1	(0)
2018	Penn FC	10	(0)
2019	New York Cosmos B	13	(1)
2020	New York Cosmos	2	(0)
2020	→ Detroit City (loan)	0	(0)
2021–	New Amsterdam	7	(0)
- * Club domestic league appearances and goals as of June 19, 2021

Salvatore Barone (born 13 December 1995) is an American soccer player who plays as a midfielder for New Amsterdam FC in the National Independent Soccer Association (NISA).

== Career ==
=== Early career ===
Barone, from an early age played with the Brooklyn Italians youth league. His father, Joe Barone, was the head coach of the Brooklyn Italians senior squad from 2009 to 2010 and then became chairman of the National Premier Soccer League in 2013. Salvatore Barone played high school soccer for Xaverian High School under head coach Carlos Jaguande. Barone then attended St. Francis College, where he played for four years under head coach Tom Giovatto. At St. Francis College Barone helped the Terriers win three NEC men's soccer tournaments and participated in 3 NCAA Tournaments. While at St. Francis College, Barone garnered several individual awards, including: Northeast conference Academic Honor Roll (2013), First Team All-Northeast Conference (2016), NEC Tournament MVP (2016), and NEC Player of the Week (October 17, 2016).

=== Professional career ===
While a freshman at St. Francis College in 2013, Barone played for the Brooklyn Italians against the New York Cosmos in the third round of the Lamar Hunt US Open Cup. In 2016, Barone played with the Brooklyn Italians of the National Premier Soccer League and scored 2 goals in 7 starts. After graduation, he also participated in the Brooklyn Italians 2017 preseason. Then on March 24, 2017, it was announced that Barone signed with the New York Cosmos.

==== 2017 ====
On May 20, 2017, Barone made his debut for the New York Cosmos coming on as a second-half substitute at Al-Hilal FC, the reigning champions of the Saudi Professional League. The match was an international exhibition that ended in a 0–0 draw. He made his NASL debut, when he came on as a substitute in the 92nd minute of regulation at Indy Eleven on July 8.

In April 2021, Barone joined National Independent Soccer Association side New Amsterdam FC ahead of the spring 2021 season.

== Career statistics ==
As of 11 July 2020

Club	Season	League		League Cup		U.S. Open Cup		CONCACAF		Total	
Club	Season	Apps	Goals	Apps	Goals	Apps	Goals	Apps	Goals	Apps	Goals
New York Cosmos	2017	1	0	0	0	0	0	0	0	1	0
Penn FC	2018	10	0	0	0	1	0	0	0	11	0
New York Cosmos B	2019	13	1	3	0	0	0	0	0	16	1
New York Cosmos	2020–21	0	0	0	0	0	0	0	0	0	0
Career total		24	1	3	0	1	0	0	0	28	1
