= St. Francis Brooklyn Terriers men's soccer =

American college soccer team

St. Francis Brooklyn Terriers
- Founded: 1968
- Folded: 2023
- University: St. Francis College
- Location: Brooklyn, New York, US
- Stadium: Brooklyn Bridge Park, Pier 5 (capacity: 1,200)
- Nickname: Terriers
- Colors: Royal blue and red
Home	Away

NCAA tournament Quarterfinals
- 1978

NCAA tournament Round of 16
- 1976

NCAA tournament appearances
- 1974, 1976, 1977, 1978, 1982, 2013, 2014, 2016, 2017, 2020

Conference tournament championships
- 1991, 1995, 1996, 1998, 2013, 2014, 2016, 2017, 2020

Conference regular season championships
- 1991, 1997, 1998, 2016, 2017, 2020

The St. Francis Terriers men's soccer team represented St. Francis College, which is located in Brooklyn Heights, New York, United States. The team was a member of the Northeast Conference (NEC) of NCAA Division I. The Terriers played their home games at Brooklyn Bridge Park on Pier 5, which is also located in Brooklyn Heights. The field is located on the East River and has the Manhattan Skyline as a backdrop.

From 1968 to 2019, the Terriers have compiled a 455–365–88 record and have won five NEC regular season championships and eight NEC tournament championships. Since joining the NEC in 1985, the Terriers have compiled a 137–117–26 record in conference play and have won the most tournament championships in the conference. The Terriers have also participated in nine National Collegiate Athletic Association (NCAA) tournaments, their best showing came in 1978 when they made it to the Elite Eight. Since joining the NEC, the Terriers have made it to four NCAA tournaments and they have been one game away on three previous occasions ('95, '96 and '98).

Their last head coach, Tom Giovatto, joined the Terriers in 2007 and led the team to a 120–85–32 record. From 2013 to 2019, Giovatto's squads won two NEC regular season championship, four NEC tournament championships and participated in four NCAA Tournaments.

== History ==
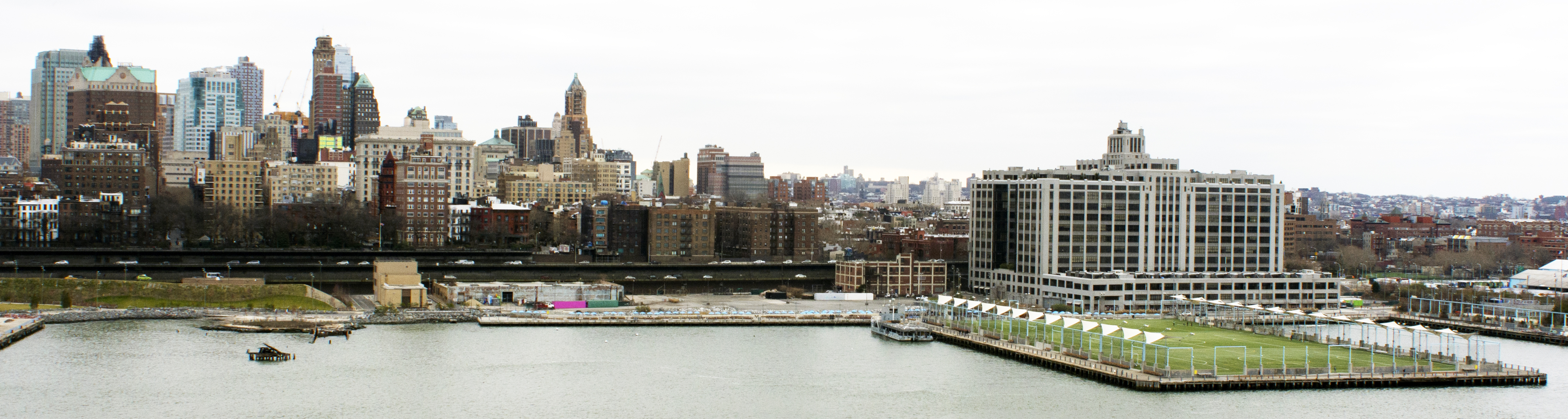
View of Brooklyn Bridge Park Pier 5, home of the Terriers, from the East River. The field is located on the lower right portion of the image.

The Terriers played their home games at Brooklyn Bridge Park on Pier 5, which is also located in Brooklyn Heights. The field is located on the East River and has the Manhattan Skyline as a backdrop. The Terriers began hosting games on Pier 5 in 2013, they previously hosted home games at the Aviator Sports Complex located at Floyd Bennett Field, Brooklyn from 2007 to 2012. Prior to 2007, the Terriers played their home games at Belson Stadium, on the St. John's University campus in Queens. The Terriers first game at Brooklyn Bridge Park Pier 5 was against the St. Peter's University Peacocks on September 13, 2013, and resulted in a 3–1 victory for the home team.

=== Carlo Tramontozzi era (1968–1988) ===
The St. Francis Terriers men's soccer team was founded in 1968 by Carlo Tramontozzi with the help of Brother Roger Nagle and then athletic director Daniel Lynch. Tramontozzi was a recent graduate of Long Island University where he had helped lead the Blackbirds men's soccer team to the NCAA tournament (1965 and 1966) and garnered various national and regional awards as a player. As the head coach of the Terriers, Tramontozzi led them to a 190–116–30 record and to 5 NCAA tournament appearances over 21 seasons. The most successful team in program history was the 1978 Terriers squad that was ranked sixth nationally and made it to the quarterfinals in the NCAA tournament. His 1981 squad was also nationally ranked in the top 20. The 1985 season marked the beginning of conference play as the Terriers joined the Northeast Conference.

=== Sam Carrington era (1989–2001) ===
Carrington is an alumnus and played on Carlo Tramontozzi's 1982 NCAA Tournament qualifying team. He coached the Terriers for 13 seasons and led them to a 127–106–16 overall record and 62–37–7 in conference play. During his tenure the Terriers won 3 regular season championships and 4 conference tournament championships.

=== Tom Giovatto era (2007–2023) ===
Current head coach, Tom Giovatto, joined the Terriers in 2007 and has led the team to a 120–85–32 record. During his tenure as head coach, the Terriers have won 2 NEC regular season championships, 4 NEC tournament championships and have appeared in 4 NCAA Tournaments.

In his first six years at the helm, Giovatto had three winning seasons and three losing seasons. He failed to reach the NEC Tournament in 5 of those first 6 years. Then Giovatto proceeded to lead the Terriers to four NEC tournament championships in five years, from 2013 to 2017. The Terriers also participated in 4 NCAA tournaments, receiving the NEC's automatic bid for the conference tournament champion. The 2015 team went unbeaten in their first 9 games and were ranked 22nd Nationally by the NSCAA Top 25 Coaches Poll for the first time in the Tom Giovatto era. Giovatto has won two NEC Coach of the Year awards, first in 2016 and again in 2017- they coincide with the Terriers winning conference regular season championships those years. Also during this time, the Terriers have placed four players in professional leagues: Vincent Bezecourt (New York Red Bulls), Salvatore Barone (New York Cosmos), Dominick Falanga (New York Cosmos), and Leo Folla (Chattanooga Red Wolves SC).

After the 2017 season, Giovatto has had to rebuild his team due to losing high impact players to graduation. In 2018 and 2019, the Terriers failed to qualify for the NEC Tournament.

=== Elimination of Athletic Program (2023) ===
On March 20, 2023, St Francis announced that their athletics programs would be eliminated following the Spring 2023 semester, with the college citing tight financial issues. In a statement, the college noted that the COVID-19 pandemic “left an indelible impact on St. Francis College, and as a result, Terrier athletics.”

== Seasons ==
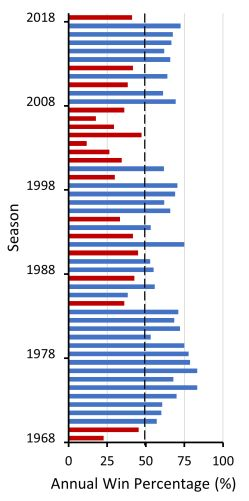
St. Francis Brooklyn Terriers annual win percentage from 1968 to 2018. Bars specify the win percentage per year, with blue bars indicating above 50% win seasons and red bars indicating at or below 50%.

St. Francis Brooklyn Terriers
Season	Head coach	Season results			Tournament results	
Season	Head coach	Overall	Conference		Conference	NCAA
Season	Head coach	Record	Record	Finish	Conference	NCAA
1968	Carlo Tramontozzi	2–8–1	—	—	—	—
1969	Carlo Tramontozzi	5–6–0	—	—	—	—
1970	Carlo Tramontozzi	7–5–2	—	—	—	—
1971	Carlo Tramontozzi	8–5–2	—	—	—	—
1972	Carlo Tramontozzi	8–5–1	—	—	—	—
1973	Carlo Tramontozzi	10–4–1	—	—	—	—
1974	Carlo Tramontozzi	12–2–1	—	—	—	First round (0–1)
1975	Carlo Tramontozzi	9–4–1	—	—	—	—
1976	Carlo Tramontozzi	12–2–1	—	—	—	Round of 16 (1–1)
1977	Carlo Tramontozzi	10–2–2	—	—	—	First round (0–1)
1978	Carlo Tramontozzi	14–4–0	—	—	—	Quarterfinal (2–1)
1979	Carlo Tramontozzi	11–3–2	—	—	—	—
1980	Carlo Tramontozzi	7–6–3	—	—	—	—
1981	Carlo Tramontozzi	12–4–2	—	—	—	—
1982	Carlo Tramontozzi	11–4–4	—	—	—	First round (0–1)
1983	Carlo Tramontozzi	13–5–1	—	—	—	—
1984	Carlo Tramontozzi	6–11–1	—	—	—	—
1985	Carlo Tramontozzi	6–10–1	3–3–0	4th	—	—
1986	Carlo Tramontozzi	9–7–1	4–2–0	3rd	—	—
1987	Carlo Tramontozzi	8–11–1	2–4–0	6th	—	—
1988	Carlo Tramontozzi	10–8–2	—	—	—	—
1989	Sam Carrington	9–8–1	4–2–1	3rd	Semi-final (0–1)	—
1990	Sam Carrington	8–10–2	4–2–1	3rd	Semi-final (0–1)	—
1991	Sam Carrington	14–4–2	6–1–0	1st	Champion (2–0)	—
1992	Sam Carrington	7–10–1	4–3–1	5th	DNQ	—
1993	Sam Carrington	8–7–1	4–4–0	6th	DNQ	—
1994	Sam Carrington	5–11–2	3–5–0	T-5th	DNQ	—
1995	Sam Carrington	14–7–1	4–3–1	3rd	Champion (2–0)	Play-In
1996	Sam Carrington	13–8–0	6–2–0	2nd	Champion (2–0)	Play-In
1997	Sam Carrington	14–6–1	5–1–0	1st	Semi-final (0–1)	—
1998	Sam Carrington	15–6–1	7–1–1	1st	Champion (2–0)	Play-In
1999	Sam Carrington	5–13–2	4–5–1	5th	Semi-final (0–1)	—
2000	Sam Carrington	10–6–1	7–2–1	2nd	Semi-final (0–1)	—
2001	Sam Carrington	5–10–1	4–6–0	7th	DNQ	—
2002	Carlo Acquista	3–11–3	3–5–2	7th	DNQ	—
2003	Carlo Acquista	1–14–2	0–9–0	10th	DNQ	—
2004	Carlo Acquista	8–9–1	5–4–0	5th	DNQ	—
2005	Carlo Acquista	4–11–2	1–8–0	10th	DNQ	—
2006	Carlo Acquista	2–13–2	2–5–2	7th	DNQ	—
2007	Tom Giovatto	4–9–5	2–5–2	8th	DNQ	—
2008	Tom Giovatto	11–4–3	4–3–2	5th	DNQ	—
2009	Tom Giovatto	10–6–2	7–2–1	2nd	Semi-final (0–1)	—
2010	Tom Giovatto	5–9–3	3–6–1	8th	DNQ	—
2011	Tom Giovatto	10–5–3	5–3–2	6th	DNQ	—
2012	Tom Giovatto	7–10–1	4–6–0	8th	DNQ	—
2013	Tom Giovatto	12–6–1	4–3–0	4th	Champion (2–0)	First round (0–1)
2014	Tom Giovatto	11–6–4	4–1–2	3rd	Champion (2–0)	First round (0–1)
2015	Tom Giovatto	10–4–4	3–2–2	4th	Semi-final (0–1)	—
2016	Tom Giovatto	12–5–3	6–0–1	1st	Champion (2–0)	First round (0–1)
2017	Tom Giovatto	14–5–1	6–0–1	1st	Champion (2–0)	First round (0–1)
2018	Tom Giovatto	7–10–0	4–4–0	T-5th	DNQ	—
2019	Tom Giovatto	7–6–2	3–5–1	T-6th	DNQ	—
2020	Tom Giovatto	7–2–1	5–1–1	1st	Champion (1–0)	Second round (1–1)
2021	Tom Giovatto	12–5–4	7–2–0	T-1st	Runner-Up (1–1)	—
2022	Tom Giovatto	8–5–6	4–1–3	3rd	Runner-Up (2–1)	—
55 Seasons		472–377–99	153–121–30	7 NEC titles (Regular Season)	20–9 in NEC Tournament; 9 NEC tournament titles	4–10 in NCAA Tournament; 10 bids
Legend
Conference regular season champion Conference tournament champion Conference regular season and conference tournament champion Post-season tournament invitation Post-season tournament champion NCAA national champion

== Players ==
=== 2019 roster ===
As of May 3, 2021. Note: Flags indicate national team as defined under FIFA eligibility rules; some limited exceptions apply. Players may hold more than one non-FIFA nationality.

No.	Pos.	Nation	Player
00	GK	RUS	Ruslan Nigmatullin
0	GK	USA	Mateo Green
1	GK	WAL	Callum James
3	DF	USA	Mamadou Diallo
4	DF	NOR	Harald Sollund
5	DF	USA	Vicente Gallardo
6	MF	CAN	Xavier Laneuville
7	MF	SRB	Ivan Tapuskovic
8	MF	USA	Dennis Coke, Jr.
9	FW	USA	Khaled Abdella
10	FW	MAR	El Mahdi Youssoufi
11	FW	ARG	Nicolas Molina
12	DF	SUI	Michael Nwokeabia
14	DF	AUS	Ridwan Hannan

No.	Pos.	Nation	Player
15	DF	USA	Domenico Pugliese
17	FW	USA	Corrado Carbone
18	MF	ENG	Jaydon Humphries
19	MF	USA	Ramchwy Saint Vil
20	MF	ALB	Sokol Ymeraj
21	MF	MAR	Badr Mesrar
22	MF	USA	Omar Gawish
23	MF	USA	Andrew Adelhardt
24	DF	USA	Derek Martinez
25	MF	USA	Austin Rafter
27	DF	USA	Johan Grande-Rojas
28	MF	USA	Tyler Swaby
30	GK	ESP	David Alcalà

Captains in bold

=== Coaching staff ===
Position	Staff
Head Coach	(United States) Tom Giovatto (2007–present)
Asst. Coach	(United Kingdom) Andy Cormack (2015–present)
Asst. Coach	(United States) Jason Orban (2019–present)

Last updated: August 26, 2019
Source: St. Francis Brooklyn Terriers Athletics Website

=== Terriers in professional leagues ===
- (United States) Leo Folla '17, signed with the Chattanooga Red Wolves SC of USL League One.
- (United States) Dominick Falanga '17, signed with the New York Cosmos of the North American Soccer League.
- (United States) Salvatore Barone '17, signed with the New York Cosmos of the North American Soccer League.
- (France) Vincent Bezecourt '16, signed with the New York Red Bulls of the Major League Soccer.
- (Venezuela) Javier Gonzalez '09, former player with Club Deportivo Ñublense of Chile's Primera Division
- (Ghana) Joseph Afful '02, playing for Brooklyn Knights of the USL Premier Development League.
- (Montenegro) Mersim Beskovic, former professional player
- (Peru) Germain Iglesias, former professional player.

== NCAA tournament results ==
The Terriers have appeared in 10 NCAA Division I Men's Soccer Championships and in 3 play-ins. Their NCAA Division I Men's Soccer Championship record is 4–10, while their Play-In record is 0–3 and does not count towards the tally. Their best finish was in 1978, when they reached the Elight Eight.

Year	Round	Opponent	Result/score
1974	First round	Cornell	L 2–4
1976	First round Sweet Sixteen	Adelphi; Hartwick	W 2–0; L 0–3
1977	First round	Hartwick	L 1–5
1978	First round Sweet Sixteen; Elight Eight	Adelphi; Columbia; Clemson	W 1–0; W 2–0; L 0–4
1982	First round	Columbia	L 1–4
1995	Play-In	Rhode Island	L 0–4

Year	Round	Opponent	Result/score
1996	Play-In	Army	L 0–3
1998	Play-In	Jacksonville	L 0–3
2013	First round	Penn State	L 0–1
2014	First round	Old Dominion	L 0–3
2016	First round	Dartmouth	L 0–1^{2OT}
2017	First round	Fordham	L 2–3^{OT}
2020	First round Second round	Milwaukee^{(3)}Indiana	W 2–1^{OT} L 1–1^{2OT} PK 1-3

== Coaching history ==
		Overall		Conference		
Name	Years	Win–loss–tie	Pct.	Win–loss–tie	Pct.	Notes
Carlo Tramontozzi	1968–88 (21yrs)	190–116–30	61.0%	9–9–0	50.0%	5 NCAA Tournament appearances
Sam Carrington	1989–2001 (13yrs)	127–106–16	54.2%	62–37–7	61.8%	3 NEC regular season championships 4 NEC tournament championships
Carlo Acquista	2002–2006 (5yrs)	18–58–10	26.7%	11–31–4	28.3%	
Tom Giovatto	2007–present	127–87–33	58.1%	60–41–16	58.1%	3 NEC Regular Season Championship; 5 NEC tournament championships 5 NCAA Tournament appearances

== Terrier records ==
	St. Francis College records	
	Season	Career
Goals	22 Bernard Celestin (1983)	48 Dimitri Petrouniak (1995–1998)
Points	46 Bernard Celestin (1983)	124 Dimitri Petrouniak (1995–1998)
Assists	22 Daniel Benoit (1974)	28 Dimitri Petrouniak (1995–1998)
Saves	189 Mark Woseley (1990)	532 Dragan Radovich (1975–1978)
Shutouts	11 Dragan Radovich (1978); 11 Mario Flava (1988)	30 Dragan Radovich (1975–1978)

== Record vs. NEC opponents ==
St. Francis Brooklyn vs.	Overall conference record
Bryant	SFBK, 12–1–2
Central Connecticut	SFBK, 18–7–4
Fairleigh Dickinson	SFBK, 20–23–6
LIU	SFBK, 22–25–4
Merrimack	SFBK, 0–2–0
Mount St. Mary's	SFBK, 2–1–0
Robert Morris	SFBK, 21–13–2
Sacred Heart	SFBK, 10–7–4
Saint Francis (PA)	SFBK, 17–15
*As of May 3, 2021. Does not count NEC Tournament games.

=== Conference rivalry ===
The fiercest rival of the Terriers are the Long Island University Blackbirds. Starting in 2013, the winner of the annual Battle of Brooklyn match is awarded the Ramirez/Tramontozzi trophy. The Trophy recognizes former coaches Arnie Ramirez and Carlos Tramontozzi, from LIU and St. Francis respectively. Both coaches were life-long friends and greatly influenced their respective programs. St. Francis Brooklyn captured the inaugural trophy on LIU's field on November 10, 2013, behind a 4–0 performance. The formal Battle of Brooklyn ended after the 2018 season, when LIU Brooklyn merged with LIU Post to form LIU and host their games on Long Island, rather than Brooklyn. Their rivalry continues, but for soccer matches the Battle of Brooklyn moniker is no longer used.

== Accolades ==
=== NCAA Division I men's soccer First-Team All-Americans ===
- Dragan Radovich, 1976, 1977, 1978
- Clyde O'Garro, 1979

=== NCAA Division I men's soccer Second-Team All-Americans ===
- Miro Urlic, 1979
- Duke Shamo, 1998

=== NCAA Division I men's soccer Third-Team All-Americans ===
- Kevin Correa, 2013
- Vincent Bezecourt, 2015
- Faouzi Taieb, 2017 (College Soccer News- Third team All-American)

=== NCAA Division I men's soccer Honorable Mention ===
- Philip Laspisa, 1974
- Gregory Kourtesis, 1976
- Flavio Vozila, 1976
- Gaetano Messina, 1978
- Philip Klah, 1979

=== NEC men's soccer ===
Year	NEC Player of the Year	NEC Defender of the Year	NEC Coach of the Year	First Team All-NEC	Second Team ALL-NEC	NEC Rookie of the Year
1986				Clint Marcelle, Lenny Leggard, Kurt Barrington, Mario Fava		
1987				Clint Marcelle, Kurt Barrington, Mario Fava		
1988	Clint Marcelle			Clint Marcelle, Kurt Barrington, Mario Fava	Andy Haynes	
1989				Irvin Ellison, Andy Haynes	Chiwale DaSilva, Leroi Wilson	
1990				Chiawale DaSilva, Andy Haynes	Irvin Ellison, Sherwin Besson	
1991			Sam Carrington	Chiawale DaSilva, Andy Haynes, Steve Mason	Irvin Ellison, Sherwyn Besson	Steve Mason
1992				Chiwale DaSilva, Sherwyn Besson	Ron Mitchell	Ron Mitchell
1993				Marlon Morris, Ron Mitchell		
1994				Marlon Morris, Ron Mitchell		
1995				Ron Mitchell		Dmitri Petrouniak
1996	Duke Shamo			Dmitri Petrouniak, Kevin Mooyoung		
1997	Duke Shamo		Sam Carrington	Duke Shamo, Dmitri Petrouniak, Troy Mohney, Augustus Pokoo-Aikens		
1998	Duke Shamo		Sam Carrington	Duke Shamo, Dmitri Petrouniak, Victor Avwontom, Agard Radoncic, Mersim Beskovic	Jared Diehl, Michel Peters	Agard Radoncic
1999				Agard Radoncic		
2000				Agard Radoncic, Mersim Beskovic, Marcus Maurice	Prince Ogodo, Agron Sokolki	
2001				Joseph Afful	Ricardo Ordain, Ron Azinge	
2002				Joseph Afful		
2003					Alessandro Acquista	
2004					Alessandro Acquista, Jarron Brooks	
2005					Carlos Moncaleano	
2006					Anthony Matos	
2007				Semso Nikocevic	John Sallhag	John Sallhag
2008				John Sallhag, Semso Nikocevic		
2009				Semso Nikocevic, Anthony Matos	Javier Gonzalez, John Sallhag	
2010					John Sallhag	
2011				Gabriel Bagot	Adam Maabdi, Aldo Toma	
2012				Kevin Correa	Adam Maabdi, Gabriel Bagot	Kevin Correa
2013				Kevin Correa, John Johansson	Andy Cormack, Gabriel Bagot	
2014				Riccardo Milano, Jack Binks	Andy Cormack, John Makaya, Vincent Bezecourt	
2015				Vincent Bezecourt, Harry Odell, Jack Binks, Cyril Coisne	Paul Galimi	
2016		Collyns Laokandi	Tom Giovatto	Salvatore Barone, Dominick Falanga, Collyns Laokandi, Robert Bazzichetto	Yussuf Olajide, Fabian Suele	Faouzi Taieb
2017		Faouzi Taieb	Tom Giovatto	Faouzi Taieb, Dominick Falanga, Collyns Laokandi, Robert Bazzichetto	Federico Curbelo, Leo Folla	
2018				Julien Remiti	Anthony Gimenes	
2019				Yoann Assoumin	El Mahdi Youssoufi	
2020	Nicolás Molina	Harald Sollund	Tom Giovatto	Nicolás Molina, Dennis Coke, Harald Sollund, Callum James	Ivan Tapuskovic	
2021	El Mahdi Youssoufi	Harald Sollund	Tom Giovatto	El Mahdi Youssoufi, Sokol Ymeraj, Harald Sollund	David Santiago	
2022				Sokol Ymeraj, Jaydon Humphires	Khaled Abdella	
