= Tom Giovatto =

American college soccer coach (born 1975)

Personal information
- Date of birth: 1975 (age 50–51)

Team information
- Current team: St. Francis Brooklyn Terriers

Youth career
- 1989–1993: Xavier High School

College career
Years	Team	Apps	(Gls)
1993–1997	Iona		

Senior career*
Years	Team	Apps	(Gls)
1997	Brooklyn Knights		

Managerial career
- 2001–2004: Xavier High School
- 2001–2004: Saint Peter's (assistant)
- 2004–2006: Stony Brook (assistant)
- 2006–2007: St. Francis Brooklyn (assistant)
- 2007–2022: St. Francis Brooklyn
- 2024: LIU (women)
- 2025–: Manhattan
Medal record
St. Francis Brooklyn
Winner	NEC Tournament	2013, 2014, 2016, 2017
Winner	NEC Regular Season	2016, 2017
Winner	NEC Coach of the Year	2016, 2017
- * Club domestic league appearances and goals

Tom Giovatto is an American college soccer coach and former player. He is the former head coach the St. Francis Brooklyn Terriers men's soccer team.

== Early life ==
Giovatto attended Xavier High School where he played forward on the soccer team. He then got a scholarship to play at Iona College and graduated in 1997 receiving a bachelor's degree in Mass Communication.

== Coaching ==
On August 22, 2007, Giovatto was appointed just the fourth head coach in the history of the St. Francis Brooklyn men's soccer program. Since joining the program, he has led St. Francis Brooklyn to seven winning seasons, three NCAA Tournaments, and three NEC Tournament Championships. Giovatto's squads have been nationally ranked and he has helped coach two All-Americans, Kevin Correa and Vincent Bezecourt.

In 2013, Giovatto's team went 12–6–1 overall, won the 2013 Northeast Conference Tournament and participated in the 2013 NCAA Tournament, for the first time since 1982. Due to his impressive performance, Giovatto was named the BigAppleSoccer.com Coach of the Year and the NSCAA North Atlantic Region Coach of the Year.

In 2014, the Terriers went 11–6–4 overall and 4–1–2 in conference play. The team won their second consecutive Northeast Conference Tournament and participated in the 2014 NCAA Tournament. The 2015 Terriers started the season unbeaten in their first 9 games and as a result were ranked at 22nd Nationally by the NSCAA Top 25 Coaches Poll for the first time in the Tom Giovatto era. Yet the finished at 10–4–4 overall and 3–2–2 in conference play.

In 2016, Giovatto won NEC Coach of the Year, after leading his team to an NEC Regular Season Championship, he then proceeded to win the 2016 NEC Tournament and participate in the NCAA Division I Men's Soccer Championship. Giovatto was also named BigAppleSoccer.com men's college coach of the year and Northeast Region head coach of the year by the National Soccer Coaches Association of America.

In 2017, Giovatto won NEC Coach of the Year, after leading his team to an NEC Regular Season Championship, he then proceeded to win the 2017 NEC Tournament and participate in the NCAA Division I Men's Soccer Championship.

== Head coaching record ==
Record table
Season	Team	Overall	Conference	Standing	Postseason
St. Francis Brooklyn Terriers (Northeast Conference) (2007–present)
2007	St. Francis (NY)	4–9–5	2–5–2	8th	
2008	St. Francis (NY)	11–4–3	4–3–2	5th	
2009	St. Francis (NY)	10–6–2	7–2–1	2nd	
2010	St. Francis (NY)	5–9–3	3–6–1	8th	
2011	St. Francis (NY)	10–5–3	5–3–2	6th	
2012	St. Francis Brooklyn	7–10–1	4–6–0	8th	
2013	St. Francis Brooklyn	12–6–1	4–3–0	4th	NCAA First Round
2014	St. Francis Brooklyn	11–6–4	4–1–2	3rd	NCAA First Round
2015	St. Francis Brooklyn	10–4–4	3–2–2	4th	
2016	St. Francis Brooklyn	12–5–3	6–0–1	1st	NCAA First Round
2017	St. Francis Brooklyn	14–5–1	6–0–1	1st	NCAA First Round
2018	St. Francis Brooklyn	7–10–0	4–4–0	T-5th	
2019	St. Francis Brooklyn	7–6–2	3–5–1	T-6th	
2020	St. Francis Brooklyn	6–1–3	5–1–1	1st	NCAA Second Round
St. Francis Brooklyn:		126–85–36	60–41–16		
Total:		126–85–36			
National champion Postseason invitational champion Conference regular season champion Conference regular season and conference tournament champion Division regular season champion Division regular season and conference tournament champion Conference tournament champion
