= Seth Roland =

American soccer player and coach

Biographical details
- Born: 1957 (age 68–69); Teaneck, New Jersey
- Education: University of Pennsylvania

Playing career
- 1975–1978: Penn Quakers
- Position: Midfielder

Coaching career (HC unless noted)
- 1987–1992: Bridgeport Purple Knights
- 1992–1997: William & Mary Tribe (assistant)
- 1997–2023: Fairleigh Dickinson Knights

Accomplishments and honors

Awards
- 2× Northeast Conference Men's Soccer Coach of the Year (2000, 2022)
Medal record
Soccer
Representing United States
Maccabiah Games
Silver medal – second place	1981 Maccabiah Games	Soccer

Seth Roland (born 1957) is the head coach of the Fairleigh Dickinson men's soccer team, a position he has held since 1997. As a player, he won a silver medal with Team USA at the 1981 Maccabiah Games in Israel. As a coach of Team USA, he won a bronze medal at the 1993 Maccabiah Games. His FDU team has won eight NEC championships and made it to the Sweet 16 and Elite Eight. As of 2022, he was the winningest coach in FDU men's soccer history, the winningest coach in Northeast Conference history, and the ninth active-winningest-coach in NCAA Division I. He was named 2000 Northeast Conference Men's Soccer Coach of the Year.

== Early and personal life ==
Roland is a native of Teaneck, New Jersey. His parents were Doris Leah (née Rubin) Roland, a psychologist, and Leonard Roland, a chemical engineer. In 2000 his wife Marjorie died from brain cancer. He and his wife Julia have two daughters, Hannah and Laura, and a son, Daniel.

== Playing career ==
=== College ===
Roland attended the University of Pennsylvania, where he played soccer and was a starting midfielder for the Quakers for three years, and was named All-Ivy League. At Penn he earned a Bachelor of Arts in history, and a Master of Science in education.

=== Maccabiah Games ===
He represented the United States in four Maccabiah Games tournaments in Israel, winning a silver medal in the 1981 Maccabiah Games, as he was the leading scorer on the team—he also represented Team USA at the 1977 Maccabiah Games, 1985 Maccabiah Games, and 1989 Maccabiah Games.

== Coaching career ==
=== Maccabiah Games ===
Roland managed the Team USA squad for the 1993 Maccabiah Games (winning the bronze medal), 1997 Maccabiah Games, 2009 Maccabiah Games, and 2022 Maccabiah Games.

=== College ===
He was the Assistant Men's Soccer Coach at Columbia University from 1980 to 1981, and the Head Men's Soccer Coach at the College of Staten Island from 1981 to 1982. Roland was then the Head Men's Soccer Coach at Christopher Newport University from 1982 to 1987, and the Head Men's Soccer Coach at the University of Bridgeport (New England Collegiate Conference) from 1987 to 1992. He was then the Assistant Men's Soccer Coach at the College of William & Mary (Colonial Athletic Association) from 1992 to 1997.

A resident of Tenafly, New Jersey, Roland has been the head coach of the Fairleigh Dickinson men's soccer team in the Northeast Conference since 1997. He was named 2000 Northeast Conference Men's Soccer Coach of the Year. As of 2022, he was the winningest coach in FDU men's soccer history (223–186–65, .538), the winningest coach in Northeast Conference history (115–60–37, .626), and the ninth active-winningest-coach in NCAA Division I.
