= Northeast Conference men's soccer tournament =

- Sport: Soccer
- Conference: Northeast Conference
- Number of teams: 4
- Format: single-elimination
- Current stadium: Campus sites
- Played: 1989-present
- Last contest: 2026
- Current champion: FDU (11th title)
- Most championships: FDU (11 titles)
- Official website: northeastconference.org/msoc

The Northeast Conference soccer tournament is the conference soccer championship of the NCAA Division I Northeast Conference (NEC). The annual tournament takes place every November to determine the NEC conference champion and the NEC’s automatic bid into the NCAA Division I Men's Soccer Championship.

In the current format, the top four regular season conference finishers based on winning percentage compete in the single-elimination tournament. The tournament features a semifinal and championship round with each game hosted on the campus of the higher seeded team. The NEC started fielding men's soccer games in 1985 and started a conference tournament in 1989, Fairleigh Dickinson won the inaugural championship.

Fairleigh Dickinson and St. Francis Brooklyn, the latter of which shut down its athletic program after the 2022 season, have won the most titles with nine (9). Fairleigh Dickinson holds the longest consecutive championship streak (4, 2000–03), followed by Monmouth (3, 2009–11). Participation of NEC Tournament Champions in the NCAA tournament has led to an overall record of 11–20, with Fairleigh Dickinson accounting for 7 wins followed by Central Connecticut and Monmouth with 2 wins apiece.

== Champions ==
=== Finals ===
The following is a list of conference regular season champions, tournament champions and tournament MVPs listed by year.

Key

- (1) – Title number
- a.e.t. – Match went to extra time
- p – Match decided by a penalty shootout after extra time
- – Winning team won regular season

Year	Champion	Score	Runner-up	MVP	Venue	Att.	Regular season champion	Teams to NCAA
1985	(no final held) (Note: Tournament championships began in 1989)						LIU Brooklyn	LIU Brooklyn
1986	(no final held)						LIU Brooklyn	LIU Brooklyn
1987	(no final held)						Loyola	
1988	(no final held)						FDU	FDU
1989	FDU (1)	6–3 (a.e.t.)	LIU Brooklyn	German Quijano, FDU	Teaneck, NJ		LIU Brooklyn	
1990	Monmouth (1)	1–0	FDU	Jim Adams, MU	West Long Branch, NJ		Monmouth	
1991	St. Francis (NY) (1)	1–0	Monmouth	Joni Kallioinen, MU	West Long Branch, NJ		St. Francis (NY)	
1992	Rider (1)	1–0	FDU	Pepe St. Phard, Rider	Teaneck, NJ		Robert Morris	
1993	Robert Morris (1)	2–0	LIU Brooklyn	Brian Davis, RMU	Teaneck, NJ		Monmouth; Fairleigh Dickinson	Robert Morris
1994	Robert Morris (2)	2–0 (a.e.t.)	Mount St. Mary's	Marco Patitucci, RMU	Coraopolis, PA		Robert Morris	Robert Morris
1995	St. Francis (NY) (2)	2–0	Monmouth	Gary Goode, SFNY	Coraopolis, PA		Robert Morris	
1996	St. Francis (NY) (3)	2–1	Robert Morris	Victor Avwontom, SFNY	Coraopolis, PA		Robert Morris	
1997	LIU Brooklyn (1)	1–0	FDU	Andres Gomez, LIU	Brooklyn, NY		St. Francis (NY)	
1998	St. Francis (NY) (4)	2–0	Central Connecticut	Dmitri Petrouniak, SFNY	Brooklyn, NY		St. Francis (NY); Central Connecticut	
1999	UMBC (1)	2–1	Mount St. Mary's	Pat Halter, UMBC	Baltimore, MD	1,650	UMBC	UMBC
2000	FDU (2)	2–0	UMBC	Dirceu Hurtado, FDU	Teaneck, NJ		FDU	
2001	FDU (3)	2–1 (a.e.t.)	LIU Brooklyn	Brian Romero, FDU	Hamden, CT		Robert Morris; FDU	FDU
2002	FDU (4)	0–0 (4–3 p)	LIU Brooklyn	Andrew Nucifora, FDU	Baltimore, MD		LIU Brooklyn; UMBC	FDU
2003	FDU (5)	2–0	Central Connecticut	Antonio Nunziata, FDU	Loretto, PA		FDU	FDU
2004	LIU Brooklyn (2)	1–0	FDU	Jonas Stigh, LIU Brooklyn	Teaneck, NJ		FDU	LIU Brooklyn
2005	Robert Morris (3)	3–2 (a.e.t.)	Monmouth	Jacek Przednowek, RMU	West Long Branch, NJ	476	Monmouth	Robert Morris
2006	Monmouth (2)	1–0	Saint Francis (PA)	Steven Holloway, MU	West Long Branch, NJ	550	Monmouth	Monmouth
2007	Central Connecticut (1)	1–0	Saint Francis (PA)	David Tyrie, CCSU	West Long Branch, NJ	130	Monmouth	Central Connecticut
2008	FDU (6)	7–2	Mount St. Mary's	Samson Malijani, FDU	West Long Branch, NJ	308	Monmouth	FDU
2009	Monmouth (3)	2–1	Quinnipiac	RJ Allen, MU	West Long Branch, NJ	612	Monmouth	Monmouth
2010	Monmouth (4)	1–0	Saint Francis (PA)	Bryant Meredith, MU	West Long Branch, NJ	950	Monmouth	Monmouth
2011	Monmouth (5)	2–1 (a.e.t.)	FDU	Kalle Sotka, MU	Fairfield, CT		CCSU; Monmouth; Sacred Heart	Monmouth
2012	FDU (7)	1–1 (6–5 p)	Saint Francis (PA)	Jacob Lissek, FDU	West Haven, CT	215	Quinnipiac	FDU
2013	St. Francis Brooklyn (5)	3–2	Bryant	Kevin Correa, SFBK	New Britain, CT	625	Central Connecticut	St. Francis Brooklyn
2014	St. Francis Brooklyn (6)	2–1 (a.e.t.)	Saint Francis (PA)	Andy Cormack, SFBK	Loretto, PA	621	Saint Francis (PA)	St. Francis Brooklyn
2015	LIU Brooklyn (1)	2–2 (3–1 p)	Saint Francis (PA)	Logan Keys, LIU	Brooklyn, NY		LIU Brooklyn	LIU Brooklyn
2016	St. Francis Brooklyn (7)	1–0 (a.e.t.)	Saint Francis (PA)	Salvatore Barone (SFBK)	Brooklyn, NY	511	St. Francis Brooklyn	St. Francis Brooklyn
2017	St. Francis Brooklyn (8)	5–0	LIU Brooklyn	Ali Tounkara (SFBK)	Brooklyn, NY	445	St. Francis Brooklyn	St. Francis Brooklyn
2018	LIU Brooklyn (2)	4–0	Bryant	Zach Peterson (LIU)	Brooklyn, NY	562	LIU Brooklyn	LIU Brooklyn
2019	FDU (8)	1–1 (3–2 p)	LIU (Note: After the merger of both athletics teams, LIU Brooklyn Blackbirds and LIU Post Pioneers.)	Jahmali Waite (FDU)	Loretto, PA	38	Merrimack	FDU
2020	St. Francis Brooklyn (9)	0–0 (6–5 p)	LIU	Callum James (SFBK)	Brooklyn, NY	0 (Note: Played without fans in attendance due to the COVID-19 pandemic.)	St. Francis Brooklyn	LIU
2021	LIU (3)	1–1 (6–5 p)	St. Francis Brooklyn	Demtri Skoumbakis (LIU)	Brookville, NY	250	LIU; St. Francis Brooklyn	LIU
2022	FDU (9)	2–1	St. Francis Brooklyn	Jaime Babero (FDU)	Teaneck, NJ	518	FDU	FDU
2023	LIU (6)	1–0	Sacred Heart	Alan Martinez (LIU)	Brookville, NY	226	St. Francis Brooklyn	LIU
2024	LIU (7)	0–0 (5–4 p)	FDU	Alan Martinez (LIU)	Teaneck, NJ	423	Mercyhurst	LIU
2025	FDU (10)	1–0 (a.e.t.)	Saint Francis	Connor O’Reilly (FDU)	Teaneck, NJ	450	FDU	FDU
2026	FDU (11)	1–0	LIU	Matheus Franca (FDU)	Brookville, NY	258	LIU	FDU

=== Champions by program ===
The following is a list of conference tournament champions listed by school.

School	App.	Titles	Winning years
FDU	18	11	1989, 2000, 2001, 2002, 2003, 2008, 2012, 2019, 2022, 2025, 2026
St. Francis Brooklyn (Note: This school no longer sponsors men's soccer in the NEC.)	11	9	1991, 1995, 1996, 1998, 2013, 2014, 2016, 2017, 2020
LIU (Note: Includes championships won by the LIU Brooklyn program, which was merged with the Division II program of the university's Post campus in July 2019, creating the current LIU program. The unified program inherited Brooklyn's Division I and NEC memberships.)	14	7	1997, 2004, 2015, 2018, (Note: Won by LIU Brooklyn, before the merger.) 2021, 2023, 2024
Monmouth	8	5	1990, 2006, 2009, 2010, 2011
Robert Morris	4	3	1993, 1994, 2005
Central Connecticut	4	1	2007
UMBC	2	1	1999
Rider	1	1	1992
Saint Francis (PA)	7	0	
Le Moyne (Note: Le Moyne joined the NEC in 2023.)	4	0	
Mount St. Mary's	3	0	
Bryant	3	0	
Mercyhurst (Note: Mercyhurst joined the NEC in 2025.)	1	0	
Quinnipiac	1	0	
Sacred Heart	1	0	
Chicago State (Note: Chicago State joined the NEC in 2024.)	0	0	
Howard (Note: Howard joined the NEC in 2021.)	0	0	
Merrimack (Note: Merrimack joined the NEC in 2019.)	0	0	
New Haven (Note: New Haven joined the NEC in 2025.)	0	0	
Stonehill (Note: Stonehill joined the NEC in 2022.)	0	0	
