= Central Connecticut Blue Devils men's soccer =

American college soccer team

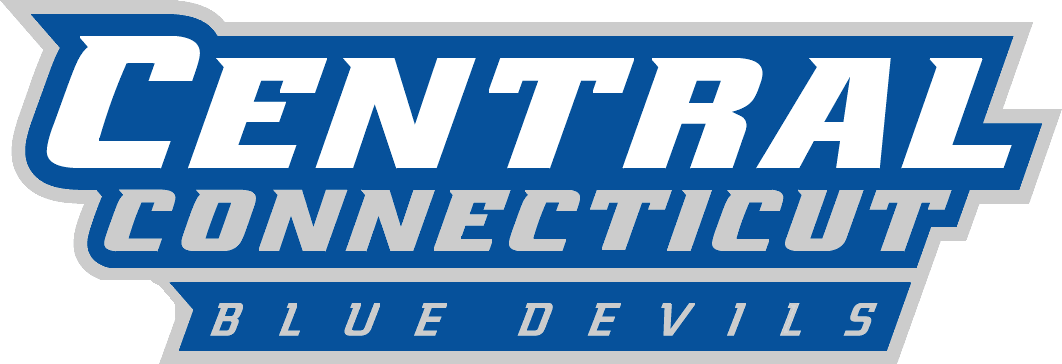
- Founded: 1969; 57 years ago
- University: Central Connecticut State University
- Head coach: David Kelly (4th season)
- Conference: NEC
- Location: New Britain, Connecticut, US
- Stadium: Central Connecticut Soccer Field (capacity: 1,000)
- Nickname: Devils
- Colors: Blue and white
Home	Away

NCAA tournament Round of 16
- 2007

NCAA tournament Round of 32
- 2007

NCAA tournament appearances
- 2007

Conference tournament championships
- 2007

Conference regular season championships
- 1998, 2011, 2013

For information on all Central Connecticut State University sports, see Central Connecticut Blue Devils

The Central Connecticut Blue Devils men's soccer team is a varsity intercollegiate athletic team of Central Connecticut State University in New Britain, Connecticut, United States. The team is a member of the Northeast Conference, which is part of the National Collegiate Athletic Association's Division I. Northwestern's first men's soccer team was fielded in 1969. The team plays its home games at Central Connecticut Soccer Field in New Britain, which opened in 2012 and sits 1,000. The Blue Devils are coached by David Kelly.

== Roster ==
As of Jul 2026

Note: Flags indicate national team as defined under FIFA eligibility rules; some limited exceptions apply. Players may hold more than one non-FIFA nationality.

No.	Pos.	Nation	Player
1	GK	ENG	Grady Wilson
2	DF	NOR	Herman Toftevåg
3	DF	USA	Trevor Ray
4	DF	CAN	Jake McConnery
5	DF	USA	Sam Carrias
6	MF	USA	Alejandro Vigil
7	FW	USA	Colin Wright
8	MF	USA	Nana Nnuro-Frimpong
9	FW	EGY	Youssef Shafei
10	MF	CRC	Santiago Marin Gutierrez
11	DF	USA	Allen Velasquez
12	DF	USA	Brian Mohl II
13	DF	ESP	Miguel Gonzalez
14	MF	USA	Nick Washington

No.	Pos.	Nation	Player
15	FW	USA	Diego Canellas
16	DF	USA	Caden Gallagher
17	MF	USA	Julian Dubash
18	MF	USA	Logan Drozd
19	MF	ESP	Alvaro Moros
20	MF	USA	Joey Tata
21	DF	NOR	Jaran Klevberg
22	MF	USA	Gavin Bravado
23	DF	USA	Ryan Drayton
24	GK	USA	Cristian Torres
25	GK	USA	Brio Levitt
26	GK	USA	Cyrus Eshagi
27	FW	USA	Anthony Catanzaro
28	FW	USA	Parker Bowman
29	FW	USA	Johannes Gikas

== Seasons ==
Key

- (1) – Title number
- – National champions
- – Conference champions
- – Division champions
- – NCAA Tournament berth

Season	Head coach	Conference	Season results							Tournament results	
Season	Head coach	Conference	Overall			Conference				Conference	NCAA
Season	Head coach	Conference	W	L	T	W	L	T	Finish	Conference	NCAA
1969	John Webster	Independent	5	3	3	—	—	—	—	—	—
1970	John Webster	Independent	7	5	0	—	—	—	—	—	—
1971	John Webster	Independent	8	4	1	—	—	—	—	—	—
1972	John Webster	Independent	4	7	1	—	—	—	—	—	—
1973	John Webster	Independent	4	6	2	—	—	—	—	—	—
1974	John Webster	Independent	3	4	5	—	—	—	—	—	—
1975	John Webster	Independent	5	4	3	—	—	—	—	—	—
1976	John Webster	Independent	6	7	0	—	—	—	—	—	—
1977	John Webster	Independent	4	8	0	—	—	—	—	—	—
1978	John Webster	Independent	4	6	2	—	—	—	—	—	—
1979	John Webster	Independent	10	4	1	—	—	—	—	—	—
1980	John Webster	Independent	9	8	2	—	—	—	—	—	—
1981	John Webster	Independent	10	2	3	—	—	—	—	—	—
1982	John Webster	Independent	12	5	0	—	—	—	—	—	—
1983	John Webster	Independent	12	5	1	—	—	—	—	—	—
1984	John Webster	Independent	4	14	0	—	—	—	—	—	—
1986	Shaun Green	Independent	11	7	1	—	—	—	—	—	—
1987	Shaun Green	Independent	5	11	3	—	—	—	—	—	—
1988	Shaun Green	Independent	12	5	2	—	—	—	—	—	—
1989	Shaun Green	Independent	15	3	0	—	—	—	—	—	—
1990	Shaun Green	East Coast Conference	10	10	1	4	2	0	—	Runners-up	—
1991	Shaun Green	East Coast Conference	4	9	5	1	3	2	—	—	—
1992	Shaun Green	East Coast Conference	7	8	2	2	0	0	—	—	—
1993*	Shaun Green	East Coast Conference	15	3	1	2	0	1	—	Champions*	—
1994^	Shaun Green	Mid-Continent Conference	15	6	2	3	2	1	2nd (East)	Champions*	NCAA Play–In^
1995^	Shaun Green	Mid-Continent Conference	15	3	3	5	0	1	1st (East)	Champions*	NCAA Play–In^
1996	Shaun Green	Mid-Continent Conference	12	8	2	2	2	2	2nd (East)	Runners-up	—
1997	Shaun Green	Mid-Continent Conference	9	10	0	5	1	0	1st (East)	Runners-up	—
1998*	Shaun Green	Northeast	9	7	3	7	1	1	T-1st*	Runners-up	—
1999	Shaun Green	Northeast	4	14	1	2	7	1	10th	—	—
2000	Shaun Green	Northeast	1	16	1	1	9	0	11th	—	—
2001	Shaun Green	Northeast	6	9	1	3	6	1	9th	—	—
2002	Shaun Green	Northeast	8	6	2	4	5	1	6th	—	—
2003	Shaun Green	Northeast	11	3	4	6	0	3	2nd	Runners-up	—
2004	Shaun Green	Northeast	7	7	2	3	5	1	7th	—	—
2005	Shaun Green	Northeast	8	6	3	5	3	1	T-2nd	Semifinals	—
2006	Shaun Green	Northeast	6	8	2	2	6	1	9th	—	—
2007^	Shaun Green	Northeast	10	9	3	4	3	2	4th	Champions*	Round of 16^
2008	Shaun Green	Northeast	9	7	2	3	5	1	T-7th	—	—
2009	Shaun Green	Northeast	6	10	1	1	8	1	11th	—	—
2010	Shaun Green	Northeast	4	10	3	1	6	3	11th	—	—
2011*	Shaun Green	Northeast	10	8	1	7	3	0	T-1st*	Semifinals	—
2012	Shaun Green	Northeast	8	8	2	6	3	1	4th	—	—
2013*	Shaun Green	Northeast	9	9	1	6	1	0	1st*	Semifinals	—
2014	Shaun Green	Northeast	5	10	2	1	5	1	7th	—	—
2015	Shaun Green	Northeast	6	9	2	3	4	0	5th	—	—
2016	Shaun Green	Northeast	2	12	3	1	5	1	8th	—	—
2017	Shaun Green	Northeast	5	8	4	2	3	2	6th	—	—
2018	Shaun Green	Northeast	1	13	1	1	7	0	10th	—	—
2019	Shaun Green	Northeast	1	13	1	1	8	0	10th	—	—
2020-21	David Kelly	Northeast	3	3	1	3	3	1	4th	—	—
2021	David Kelly	Northeast	2	12	2	2	5	2	8th	—	—
2022	David Kelly	Northeast	3	11	1	1	6	1	9th	—	—
2023	David Kelly	Northeast	3	9	3	1	4	3	T-7th	—	—
2024	David Kelly	Northeast	1	14	1	1	7	0	9th	—	—

=== NCAA tournament results ===
Central Connecticut has appeared in one NCAA tournament.

November 24, 2007 First round	Central Connecticut Blue Devils	3–2	Harvard Crimson	Cambridge, Massachusetts
14:00 EST

November 28, 2007 Second round	Central Connecticut Blue Devils	3–2	^{No. 16} Tulsa Golden Hurricane	Tulsa, Oklahoma
14:00 EST	Klukowski 23'; Rundquist 48'; Smith 81'	Report	McInnes 21'; Goddard 86'	Stadium: Hurricane Soccer & Track Stadium

December 9, 2007 Third round	Central Connecticut Blue Devils	1–3	UMass Minutemen	Amherst, Massachusetts
14:00 EST		Report		Stadium: Rudd Field
