= LIU Brooklyn Blackbirds =

- University: LIU Brooklyn
- Nickname: Blackbirds
- NCAA: Division I
- Conference: Northeast Conference
- Athletic director: Brad Cohen
- Location: Brooklyn, New York
- Varsity teams: 16
- Basketball arena: Steinberg Wellness Center
- Baseball stadium: Long Island University Field
- Colors: Black and silver

The LIU Brooklyn Blackbirds were the athletic teams representing Long Island University's campus in Brooklyn, New York in intercollegiate athletics, including men's and women's basketball, cross country, golf, soccer, and track; women's-only bowling, lacrosse, softball, tennis, and volleyball; and men's-only baseball. The Blackbirds competed in NCAA Division I and were members of the Northeast Conference.

A member of the Northeast Conference, LIU Brooklyn sponsored teams in six men's and thirteen women's NCAA sanctioned sports:

The LIU Brooklyn Blackbirds merged with the Division II LIU Post Pioneers after the 2018–19 academic year. The new program now competes as the LIU Sharks with a blue and gold color scheme.

== Nickname ==
Following Long Island University's founding in 1927, its sports teams wore blue uniforms and became known as the Blue Devils. After the school's uniforms were changed to black in 1935, a Brooklyn Eagle reporter from the Midwest saw the new look as the basketball team dribbled up and down the court and stated that the team looked like the blackbirds from back home; the comment struck home, and a new nickname was born.

== Sponsored sports ==
Men's sports	Women's sports
Baseball	Basketball
Basketball	Bowling
Golf	Cross country
Soccer	Field hockey
Track & field^{1}	Golf
	Lacrosse
	Soccer
	Softball
	Swimming & diving
	Tennis
	Track & field^{1}
	Volleyball
^{1} – includes both indoor and outdoor.

=== Basketball ===
In basketball, guard Barry Leibowitz played for the Blackbirds from 1964-67, and had a total of 1,032 points. He helped lead the team to a 60-18 record, three consecutive Tri-State League championships, and three straight NCAA College Division appearances. He was All-Met and All-Tri-State in 1966, co-captain of the team in 1966-67, and was named an All-American in 1967.

=== Soccer ===
In soccer, Dov Markus played on the Blackbirds from 1965 to 1967. In 1965 as a sophomore, Markus scored 35 goals in 14 games for 70 points, at the time both the most-ever goals and the most-ever points in an NCAA season. Over his three-year career, Markus scored 79 goals, setting a new NCAA career record, in 49 games. Markus won the 1967 Hermann Trophy as the outstanding collegiate soccer player of the year. He was the first recipient of the Hermann Trophy. In 2000, LIU inducted Markus into its Athletic Hall of Fame.

== Notable athletes ==
Name	Sport	Tenure
(Israel) Shmuel Avishar	Basketball	1970–71
(United States) Barry Leibowitz	Basketball (Note: He made a professional career at the American Basketball Association and the Israeli Basketball Premier League.)	1964–67
(United States) Ivan Leshinsky	Basketball	1964–68
(United States) Dov Markus	Soccer	1965–67

== Titles ==
Sport	Competition	Titles	Years won
Soccer (m)	NEC regular season	4	1985, 1986, 1989, 2002
Soccer (m)	NEC tournament	4	1997, 2004, 2015, 2018
