= Bryant Bulldogs baseball =

American college baseball team

- 2026 Bryant Bulldogs baseball team
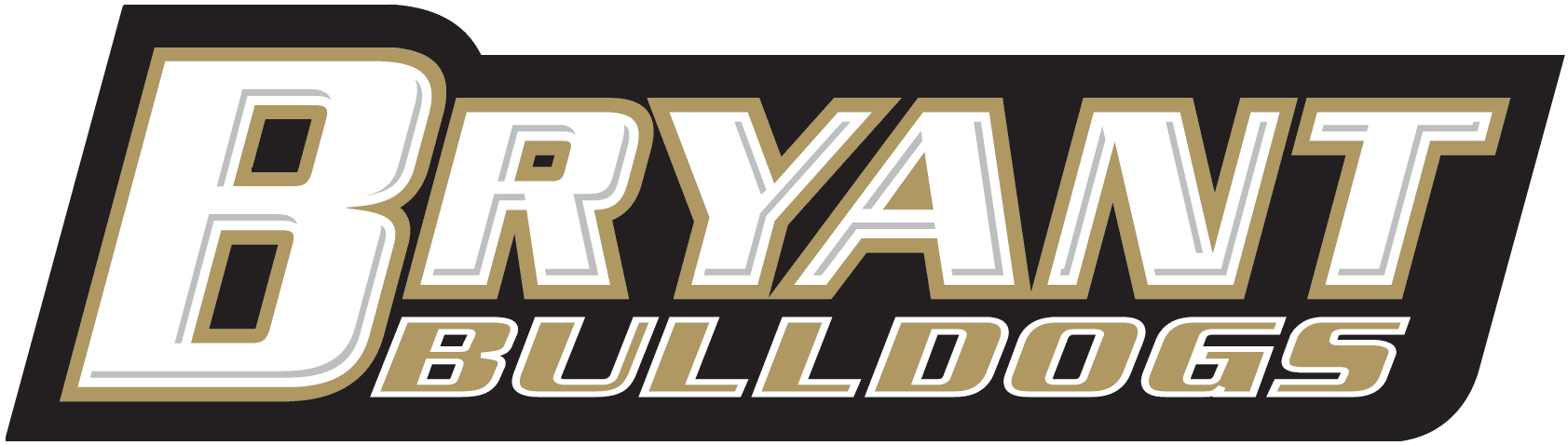
- Founded: 1969
- University: Bryant University
- Head coach: Ryan Klosterman (7th season)
- Conference: America East
- Location: Smithfield, Rhode Island
- Home stadium: Conaty Park (capacity: 500)
- Nickname: Bulldogs
- Colors: Black and gold

College World Series appearances
- Division II: 2004

NCAA regional champions
- Division II Northeast: 2004

NCAA tournament appearances
- Division I: 2013, 2014, 2016, 2024; Division II: 1986, 1998, 2004, 2007, 2008

Conference tournament champions
- America East: 2024; NEC: 2013, 2014, 2016; NE-10: 1999

Conference regular season champions
- America East: 2024, 2025; NEC: 2010, 2012, 2013, 2014, 2015, 2016, 2021; NE-10: 1986, 1996, 1998, 2000, 2002, 2008

The Bryant Bulldogs baseball team is the NCAA Division I varsity intercollegiate baseball team of Bryant University, located in Smithfield, Rhode Island. The program participates as a member of the America East Conference. The Bulldogs previously participated as members of the Northeast Conference. It plays at Conaty Park on the northern edge of Bryant's campus. Ryan Klosterman has been the program's head coach since the 2020 season.

In Division I, Bryant has appeared in two NCAA tournaments; it has won the NEC tournament twice and the NEC regular season title four times. In Division II, it appeared in five NCAA tournaments, including the 2004 College World Series; it won the Northeast-10 Tournament once and the NE-10 regular season title six times.

Three former Bulldogs, Keith MacWhorter, James Karinchak, and Mickey Gasper have gone on to play in Major League Baseball.

== History ==
=== Division II ===
1969 was Bryant's first season of varsity NCAA baseball. Under head coach Bill Stein, the team went 5–14. In 1970, it improved to 11–8. For those first two seasons, Bryant competed in the College Division's Southern New England Conference (SNEC). For its first three seasons, Bryant was located in Providence; Stein coached the team in all three seasons before moving to Georgetown to become an assistant men's basketball coach under John Thompson. The school moved to its present-day Smithfield location ahead of the 1971–72 academic year.

The school hired Steve Thornton to replace Stein. The school did not sponsor a team in 1974 or 1976, but in the three seasons Thornton did coach (1972, 1973, and 1975), Bryant went 26–28 overall. In the middle of this stretch, in August 1973, the NCAA reorganized its divisions. Prior to then, the NCAA had competed in two divisions, a large-school University Division and a small-school College Division. Following the reorganization, the University Division became Division I, while the College Division split into Division II and Division III. UC Riverside became a Division II Independent. Bryant, which had been playing in the College Division, joined Division II.

In 1976, Keith MacWhorter became the program's first MLB draft selection when the Dodgers picked him in the 15th round. He later played for the Boston Red Sox.

Former Providence hockey player Bob Reall coached the team from 1977 to 1978. The team went a combined 11–41. Another Providence alumnus, Michael McGuinn, was the head coach from 1979 to 1983. The program had its worst season in McGuinn's first year, going 1–22. The team suffered two 18-run losses (22–4 to New Haven and 18–0 to Eastern Connecticut) but also lost five one-run games. Its lone win came against Barrington.

==== Northeast-10 Conference ====
Bryant was a founding member of the Northeast-7 Conference in the 1980–81 academic year. The conference became the Northeast-8 when Saint Anselm joined the following year and the Northeast-10 (NE-10) when Saint Michael's and Quinnipiac joined for the 1987–88 academic year.

Earl Matthewson replaced McGuinn and coached the team from 1984 and 1986. He had an overall record of 58–32–1 won the Northeast-10 Coach of the Year award in all three seasons. The 1985 team went 21–11 and lost to Stonehill in the NE-10 title game. In 1986, Bryant 22–11–1, won the NE-10, and qualified for its first NCAA tournament. It went 0–2 at the Northeast Regional, losing games to New Haven and Adelphi.

After Matthewson left, Dale O'Dell coached the team from 1987 to 1990. Two players won major conference awards under him, both in 1987. Tony Garganese was named NE-10 Player of the Year, Bob Heinzemann Freshman of the Year. Heinzemann was the fourth consecutive Bulldog to win the award (Garganese won it in 1985). Garganese was also named a Division II All-American by the ABCA.

Bryant alumnus and Rhode Island assistant Jon Sjogren became the program's head coach after O'Dell. He held the position for 15 seasons (1991–2005) and had an overall 360–305–1 record.

The Bulldogs went 13–17 in Sjogren's first season. Outfielder Glenn Tatro became Bryant's second draftee when the Orioles picked him in the 25th round. Bryant had its first winning season under Sjogren in 1992, when the team went 21–17 and lost to Springfield in the NE-10 title game.

In 1997, facility problems plagued the team, which had to play 42 of its 43 games on the road. It finished the season with a 21–22 record. The Bryant Baseball Complex opened a few years later during the 2000 season.

In 1998, Bryant reached its second NCAA tournament after winning the NE-10's regular season title. It went 1–2 at the Northeast Regional, notching its first tournament win with a 10-inning, 7–6 defeat of UMass Lowell in the opening game. The program's first 30-win season came in 2001, and it reached its third NCAA tournament in 2002, again going 1–2 at the Northeast Regional.

For the 2003 season, the Northeast-10 switched from metal to wooden baseball bats. Sjogren said of the decision, "We did it for the sake of the game, to make it cleaner and return it to the way it was meant to be played. We certainly feel it has done that."

Bryant's 2004 team made the program's deepest postseason run, going 40–17 and reaching the College World Series. The team used wooden bats during the regular season in accordance with NE-10 rules, then switched to metal bats for the NCAA postseason. Bryant hosted the Northeast Regional, which it won with a 3–1 record, defeating Dowling in the championship game. At the Division II World Series in Montgomery, Bryant won its opener against Rollins, then lost games to Grand Valley State and Central Missouri and was eliminated. B.J. Gagnon, who had been named the regionals MVP, was named to the All-World Series Team. Sjogren was named the 2004 ABCA Northeast Region Coach of the Year.

After the 2005 season, Sjogren left to become the head coach at Rollins, where he replaced Bob Rikeman, who had left to become the head coach at Newberry. Bryant hired Assumption head coach Jamie Pinzino to replace him. In five seasons as head coach, Pinzino had a 162–122 overall record.

Bryant went 18–33 in Pinzino's first season but made back-to-back NCAA tournaments in 2007 and 2008. Both times, it lost to Franklin Pierce in the Northeast Regional finals. Pitcher Eric Loh of the 2007 team received several major awards: ABCA Division II All-American, ABCA Northeast Region Pitcher of the Year, and NE-10 Pitcher of the Year. Pinzino was named the NE-10's Coach of the Year.

=== Division I ===
Bryant joined the NCAA Division I in the 2009 season. Playing as an independent, the Bulldogs went 32–22. Shortstop Pat McKenna was drafted by the Tigers following the season. The school's programs joined the Northeast Conference (NEC) for the 2009–10 academic year; the baseball program was ineligible for the postseason from 2010 to 2012 while the school completed the transition to Division I.

In 2010, Bryant won the NEC regular season title with a 25–7 conference record. It won three of the NEC's four major awards: Pinzino was named Coach of the Year, Kevin Brown Rookie of the Year, and Brent Almeida Pitcher of the Year. Brown was also named a Louisville Slugger Freshman All-American.

Following the season, Pinzino was involved in an incident that led to his resignation. At a postseason athletic department barbecue in May, Pinzino became intoxicated, got in a fight with an assistant baseball coach on Bryant's baseball field, and was confrontational with police when they arrived at the scene. Pinzino was arrested and charged with three misdemeanors (simple assault, disorderly conduct, and resisting arrest). As a result, he resigned his position as Bryant's baseball coach.

Bryant hired Steve Owens to replace him. Owens came from Le Moyne, which had left Division I for Division II the same offseason. At Le Moyne, he won four MAAC regular season titles, was named conference Coach of the Year twice, and appeared in three NCAA tournaments.

In Owens's second season, 2012, Bryant won another NEC regular season title, going 33-21 (24-8 NEC). The Bulldogs again won three of the conference's four major awards: Owens was Coach of the Year, Kevin McAvoy Rookie of the Year, and Peter Kelich Pitcher of the Year.

Kansas State's Tointon Family Stadium, the site of Bryant's NCAA tournament win in 2013.

In 2013, Bryant set a program wins record and reached its first Division I NCAA tournament. The Bulldogs had a 40–15–1 regular season that included a 19-game winning streak from March 22 to April 16. For the third time, the team won three NEC major awards, with Owens the Coach of the Year, AJ Zarozny the Rookie of the Year, and Brown the Player of the Year. The team lost its opener in the NEC tournament to Long Island, then won four games in a row to win the tournament and the NEC's automatic bid to the NCAA tournament. As the third seed in the Manhattan Regional, Bryant defeated Arkansas in the opener before losing consecutive games. They finished the season at 45–18–1. Owens was named the ABCA Northeast Region Coach of the Year. Brown was named a Third-Team All-American by the ABCA, and five players were named First-Team All-New England. Brown, Kelich, and Joseph Michaud were drafted after the season.

In 2014, Bryant reached a second consecutive NCAA tournament. After a 39–14 regular season. Owens won his second conference Coach of the Year award; Craig Schlitter won Pitcher of the Year and Matt Albanese Rookie of the Year. The Bulldogs swept through the NEC tournament, defeating Wagner, Central Connecticut, and Sacred Heart to win the title. As the third seed at the Baton Rouge Regional, Bryant went 0–2, losing two one-run games. Owens was named the ABCA Northeast Region Coach of the Year for the second year in a row. After the season, a program-record four players were picked in the MLB draft; McAvoy became Bryant's highest selection when the Red Sox selected him in the fourth round.

=== Conference affiliations ===
- Southern New England Conference (College Division): 1969–1970
- Independent (College Division/Division II): 1971–1973, 1975, 1976–1980
- Northeast-10 Conference (Division II): 1981–2008
- Independent (Division I): 2009
- Northeast Conference (Division I): 2010–2022
- America East Conference (Division I): 2023–present

== Bryant in the NCAA tournament ==
Bryant has appeared in the NCAA Division I baseball tournament four times. They have a record of 1–8.

| Year | Region | Opponent | Result |
|---|---|---|---|
| 2013 | Manhattan Regional | Arkansas; Kansas State; Arkansas | W 4–1; L 1–7; L 3–12 |
| 2014 | Baton Rouge Regional | Houston; Southeastern Louisiana | L 2–3 (10); L 1–2 (10) |
| 2016 | Charlottesville Regional | East Carolina; William & Mary | L 1–9; L 3–4 |
| 2024 | Raleigh Regional | NC State; James Madison | L 2–9; L 1–8 |

== Venues ==
=== Conaty Park ===
Bryant has played at Conaty Park since it was built for the 2000 season. Prior to being dedicated to alumni donor Bill Conaty on April 28, 2012, it was known as the Bryant Baseball Complex. Its capacity of 500 people consists of 200 chairback seats and berm seating beyond the outfield fence.

In 2004, the facility hosted the Division II Northeast Regional, which included Bryant, Saint Anselm, Dowling, and Caldwell. Bryant went 3–1 to win the double-elimination regional.

== Head coaches ==
Since its first season in 1969, Bryant has had nine head coaches. Bill Stein, who held the position from 1969 to 1971, was the program's first head coach. Jon Sjogren, who coached the team from 1991 to 2005, is both the longest-tenured (15 seasons) and winningest (360) coach.

| Tenure(s) | Coach | Seasons | W–L–T | Pct |
|---|---|---|---|---|
| 1969–1971 | Bill Stein | 3 | 23–33 | .411 |
| 1972–1973, 1975 | Steve Thornton | 3 | 26–28 | .481 |
| 1977–1978 | Bob Reall | 2 | 11–41 | .212 |
| 1979–1983 | Michael McGuinn | 5 | 48–88 | .353 |
| 1984–1986 | Earl Matthewson | 3 | 58–32–1 | .644 |
| 1987–1990 | Dale O'Dell | 4 | 39–36–1 (Note: 1989 records missing.) | .520 |
| 1991–2005 | Jon Sjogren | 15 | 360–305–2 | .541 |
| 2006–2010 | Jamie Pinzino | 5 | 162–122 | .570 |
| 2011–2019 | Steve Owens | 9 | 328–184–2 | .640 |
| 2020–present | Ryan Klosterman | 5 | 123–97–1 | .559 |
| TOTALS | 10 | 54 | 1,178–967–5 | .549 |

== Yearly records ==
Below is a table of Bryant's yearly records. After playing its first season in 1969, the team was not sponsored in 1974 or 1976. It joined Division I in 2009.

Record table
| Season | Coach | Overall | Conference | Standing | Postseason |
|---|---|---|---|---|---|
Southern New England Conference – DII (1969–1970)
| 1969 | Bill Stein | 5-14 | 1-7 | | |
| 1970 | Bill Stein | 11-8 | 4-4 | | |
Independent – Division II (1971–1973)
| 1971 | Bill Stein | 7-11 | | | |
| 1972 | Steve Thornton | 9-7 | | | |
| 1973 | Steve Thornton | 7-10 | | | |
No team (1974)
Independent – Division II (1975)
| 1975 | Steve Thornton | 10-11 | | | |
No team (1976)
Independent – Division II (1977–1980)
| 1977 | Bob Reall | 8-16 | | | |
| 1978 | Bob Reall | 3-25 | | | |
| 1979 | Michael McGuinn | 1-22 | | | |
| 1980 | Michael McGuinn | 10-15 | | | |
NE-7/NE-8/NE-10 (Note: The Northeast-10 was founded as the Northeast-7 Conference, became the Northeast-8 in 1982 when Saint Anselm joined, and adopted its current name in 1988 when Saint Michael's and Quinnipiac joined.) (1981–2008)
| 1981 | Michael McGuinn | 9-19 | 2-10 | | |
| 1982 | Michael McGuinn | 11-15 | 3-10 | | |
| 1983 | Michael McGuinn | 17-17 | 3-8 | | |
| 1984 | Earl Matthewson | 15-10 | 6-6 | | |
| 1985 | Earl Matthewson | 21-11 | 9-6 | | NE-10 Tournament |
| 1986 | Earl Matthewson | 22-11-1 | | 1st | NCAA Regional |
| 1987 | Dale O'Dell | 14-7-1 | 6-3 | | |
| 1988 | Dale O'Dell | 13-15 | | | |
| 1989 | Dale O'Dell | N/A | | | |
| 1990 | Dale O'Dell | 12-14 | 5-12 | | |
| 1991 | Jon Sjogren | 13-17 | 9-9 | | |
| 1992 | Jon Sjogren | 21-17 | 9-9 | | NE-10 Tournament |
| 1993 | Jon Sjogren | 15-18 | 9-13 | | |
| 1994 | Jon Sjogren | 16-24-1 | 10-12 | | |
| 1995 | Jon Sjogren | 17-22 | 10-12 | | |
| 1996 | Jon Sjogren | 24-20 | 13-6 | 1st | NE-10 Tournament |
| 1997 | Jon Sjogren | 21-22 | 13-10 | | |
| 1998 | Jon Sjogren | 29-19 | 20-5 | 1st | NCAA Regional |
| 1999 | Jon Sjogren | 23-25 | 13-11 | | NE-10 Tournament |
| 2000 | Jon Sjogren | 29-19 | 19-5 | 1st | NE-10 Tournament |
| 2001 | Jon Sjogren | 30-20 | 23-10 | | NE-10 Tournament |
| 2002 | Jon Sjogren | 35-22 | 24-9 | 1st | NCAA Regional |
| 2003 | Jon Sjogren | 24-22-1 | 16-14 | | NE-10 Tournament |
| 2004 | Jon Sjogren | 40-17 | 24-9 | | College World Series |
| 2005 | Jon Sjogren | 22-21 | 16-14 | 6th | NE-10 Tournament |
| 2006 | Jamie Pinzino | 18-33 | 16-14 | 6th | NE-10 Tournament |
| 2007 | Jamie Pinzino | 35-24 | 21-9 | 3rd | NCAA Regional |
| 2008 | Jamie Pinzino | 43–21 | 25–5 | 1st | NCAA Regional |
| Division II: | | 660–641–3 | | | |
Independent – Division I (2009)
| 2009 | Jamie Pinzino | 32–22 | | | |
Northeast Conference (2010–2022)
| 2010 | Jamie Pinzino | 34–22 | 25–7 | 1st | |
| 2011 | Steve Owens | 30–23 | 19–12 | 4th | |
| 2012 | Steve Owens | 33–21 | 24–8 | 1st | |
| 2013 | Steve Owens | 45–18 | 27–5 | 1st | NCAA Regional |
| 2014 | Steve Owens | 42–16 | 19–5 | 1st | NCAA Regional |
| 2015 | Steve Owens | 29–25 | 17–7 | 1st (7) | |
| 2016 | Steve Owens | 47–12 | 26–4 | 1st (7) | NCAA Regional |
| 2017 | Steve Owens | 30–27 | 20–6 | 1st (7) | |
| 2018 | Steve Owens | 32–23–1 | 21–7 | T-1st (7) | |
| 2019 | Steve Owens | 40–20 | 19–5 | 1st (7) | |
| 2020 | Ryan Klosterman | 4–11 | 0–0 | | Season canceled due to COVID-19 |
| 2021 | Ryan Klosterman | 27–14–1 | 21–4 | 1st | Northeast Tournament |
| 2022 | Ryan Klosterman | 30–27 | 17–10 | 2nd | Northeast Tournament |
America East Conference (2023–present)
| 2023 | Ryan Klosterman | 26–24 | 12–12 | T–3rd | America East Tournament |
| 2024 | Ryan Klosterman | 36–21 | 17–7 | 1st | NCAA Regional |
| Division I: | | 517–326–2 | 284–99 | | |
| Total: | | 1,178–967–5 | | | |
National champion Postseason invitational champion Conference regular season champion Conference regular season and conference tournament champion Division regular season champion Division regular season and conference tournament champion Conference tournament champion

== Notable alumni ==
Bulldogs who have gone on to play Major League Baseball:

- Mickey Gasper (born 1995), 1B – Boston Red Sox (2024), Minnesota Twins (2025), Boston Red Sox (2026-Present)
- James Karinchak (born 1995), P – Cleveland Guardians (2019–2023)
- Keith MacWhorter (born 1955), P – Boston Red Sox(1980)

== Major League Baseball draft ==
=== 2010 ===
One Bulldog was selected in the 2010 MLB draft. Catcher Jeff Vigurs was taken in the 22nd round by the Chicago Cubs. He appeared in 32 games for the short-season Boise Hawks that year.

=== 2013 ===
Three Bulldogs were selected in the 2013 draft: outfielder Kevin Brown (22nd round, Chicago Cubs), pitcher Joseph Michaud (33rd round, Oakland), and pitcher Pete Kelich (38th round, San Diego). All three signed professional contracts.

=== 2014 ===
In 2014, a record four Bulldogs were selected in the MLB draft. Pitcher Kevin McAvoy, chosen by Boston in the fourth round, became the program's highest draft pick. Outfielder Carl Anderson (Pittsburgh) and catcher Tom Gavitt (Oakland) were selected with consecutive picks in the 19th round. Pitcher Craig Schlitter was selected in the 27th round by Colorado.

== See also ==
- List of NCAA Division I baseball programs
