= Conaty =

Conaty is the anglicised form of the Gaelic Irish surname "Ó Connachtaigh," meaning "descendant of the Connachtman." The surname is predominantly found in County Cavan, Ireland, and, although uncommon, can be found in other parts of the country as well as in Irish communities in England and America.

Its coat of arms depict two golden boar and two golden axes upon a blue shield.

Variations in the spelling of Conaty include: O'Conaty, Connaghty, Connoty, and MacConaghy.

== Notable people with the surname ==
Ua/Ó Connachtaigh

- Searrach Ó Connachtaigh, killed in the Battle of Dún Dubáin (c.1145).
- Tuathal Ó Connachtaigh, Bishop of Bréifni from 1152 to 1179
- Flann Ua Connachtaigh, Bishop of Bréifni from c.1211 to 1231.

Conaty

- Nicholas Conaty (1820–1886), Bishop of Kilmore from 1865 to 1886
- Bill Conaty (born 1973), former professional American football player
- Jack Conaty (born 1946), currently the chief political correspondent for WFLD-TV in Chicago
- Nicholas Conaty (1820–1886), Irish Roman Catholic bishop for the Diocese of Kilmore
- Thomas James Conaty (1847–1915), the Bishop of the Diocese of Monterey-Los Angeles from 1903 to 1915
- Rich Conaty (1954–2016), New York City disc jockey
- Roisin Conaty, London-Irish comedian
- William J. Conaty, American businessman

== See also ==
- Bishop Conaty-Our Lady of Loretto High School, Catholic, archdiocesan, all-female high school in Los Angeles, California
- Conaty Park, baseball venue in Smithfield, Rhode Island, United States
