= St. Peter's Boys High School =

Saint Peter's Boys High School

Location
- 200 Clinton Avenue (West New Brighton) Staten Island, New York 10301; United States; 40°38′21″N 74°5′57″W

Information
- Type: Private
- Motto: Signum Fidei (Sign of Faith)
- Religious affiliation: Roman Catholic
- Established: 1917 (109 years ago)
- President: John Fodera
- Principal: Mike Cosentino
- Teaching staff: 28.5 (FTE)
- Grades: 9–12
- Gender: All-male
- Enrollment: 466 (2019–20)
- Student to teacher ratio: 16.4
- Campus type: Suburban
- Colors: Blue and gold
- Athletics: 21 interscholastic teams
- Athletics conference: Catholic High School Athletic Association
- Nickname: Eagles
- Accreditation: Middle States Association of Colleges and Schools
- Newspaper: The Eagle
- Yearbook: Aquilian
- Website: stpetersboyshs.org

St. Peter's Boys High School is a Catholic all-boys' high school, located in the West New Brighton area of the Staten Island borough of New York City, New York.

The school is affiliated with the Christian Brothers of St. John Baptist de la Salle, and is a member of the Catholic High School Athletic Association.

The school is located at 200 Clinton Avenue and is part of St. Peter's parish on Staten Island, which also ran a grammar school and all-girls' high school.

== History ==
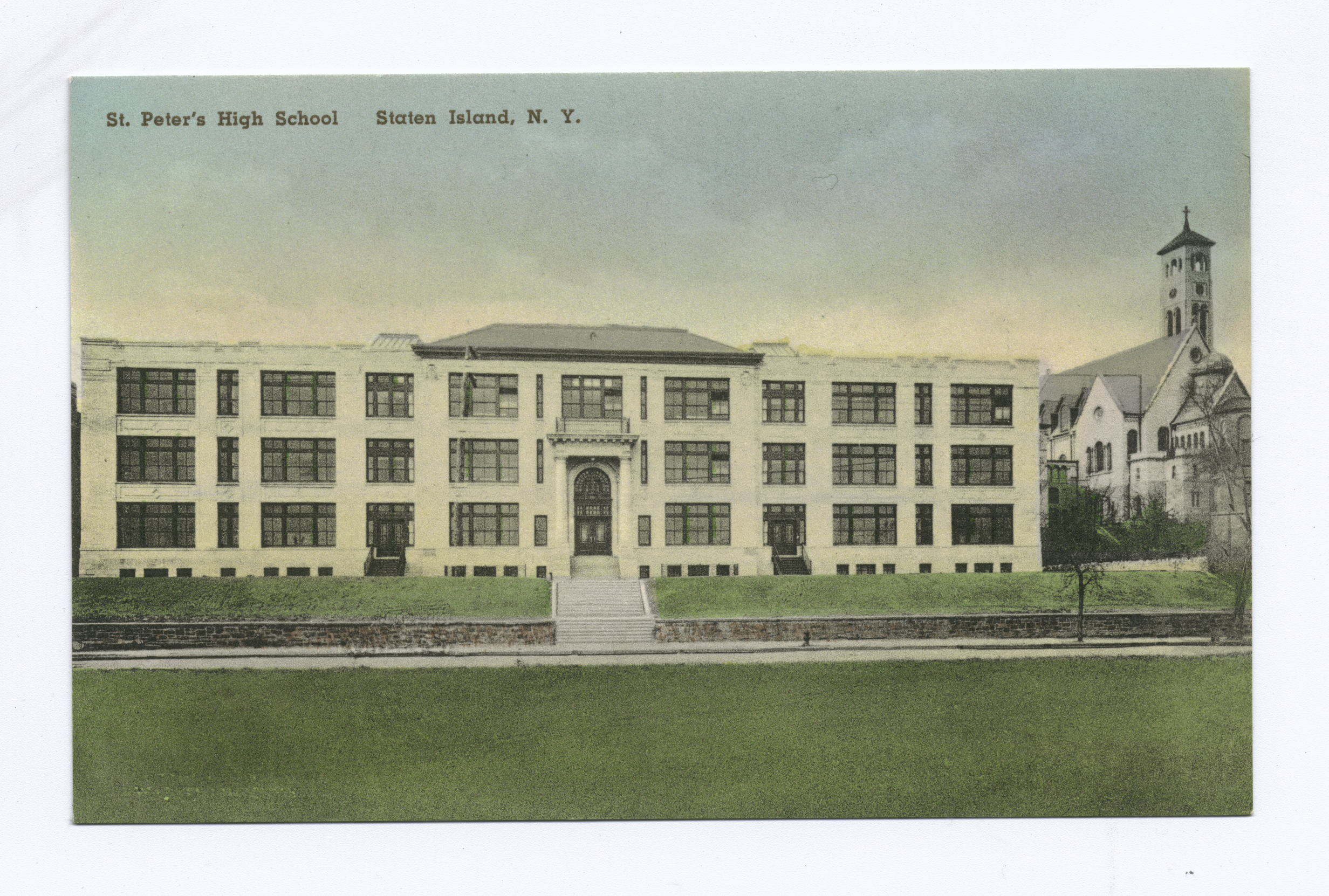
Richmond Terrace, 1920s postcard

=== Origins ===
The school's origins can be traced back to 1839, with the dedication of St. Peter's parish.

With the arrival of three Christian Brothers in 1917, the school was founded on Richmond Terrace in the New Brighton area of Staten Island.

Father Joseph Farrell and other local clergy took over operation of the school in 1920 when the Brothers were withdrawn due to World War I. The Brothers would return ten years later in 1930. At this time, there were more Brothers at the school than ever before.

In 1937, the school's main campus was designated as a junior college of Manhattan College, another Lasallian institution. By 1943, the junior college closed and St. Peter's Boys High School relocated to that campus. The school's main campus has remained there since, on the corner of Clinton and Henderson Avenues.

The school maintains an alumni community, including the St. Peter's High School Glee Club and Seton Chorale Alumni who organize an annual scholarship benefit Christmas concert for its late instructor, Carl Lesch.

=== The modern era ===
In 1965, the Roman Catholic Archdiocese of New York agreed to assist in the funding of a new gymnasium, which would also serve as the school's auditorium.

By 1969, however, the school's closing was imminent. The community rallied around St. Peter's and local support prevented the school from closing.

As of the 2019–2020 school year, the school's enrollment was 466 students.

The Brothers' involvement in the school has been in decline due to a continual decrease in men entering the Institute of the Brothers of the Christian Schools.

In 2001, eight Brothers taught at the school along with two Sisters of St. Joseph and 31 lay faculty members.

In 2009, the varsity football team won the CHSAA single A championship 41–0 against the Bishop Ford Central Catholic High School Falcons.

In June 2024, the original brothers historic residence building, located on the Clinton Ave side of the campus, was torn down without warning or fanfare. A tragic loss of a piece of Staten Island history.

== Academics ==
St. Peter's is accredited by the New York State Board of Regents. The school is operated by the Brothers of the Christian Schools, a Roman Catholic order of consecrated religious men St. Peter's is also a member of the Middle States Association of Colleges and Schools.

=== Curriculum ===
All students enrolled are expected to complete an academic program that includes four courses within the Religion Department, four courses within the English Department, four courses within the History Department, three within the Math Department, two courses in the sciences, three language courses, as well as an art & music course, a health course, four years of physical education, and usually three elective courses. All "scholars students" are also required to complete at least two years of Latin.

== Notable alumni ==
- Michael Codd (1934), former New York City Police Commissioner
- Buddy O'Grady (1939), NBA player and college basketball coach
- Ray Corley (1945), NBA player
- Larry Bearnarth (1958), MLB pitcher and coach
- Bill Sheridan (1960), basketball coach who coached overseas
- Ed Murphy (1963), executive director of the Workforce Development Institute
- James Rispoli (1964), former Assistant Secretary of Energy for Environmental Management
- Eric N. Vitaliano (1966), judge
- Kenneth Mitchell (1983), former New York City Council member
- A. J. Pero (1977 - transferred), drummer for Twisted Sister and Adrenaline Mob
- Jim Engles (1986), college basketball coach
- Craig Noto (1989), baseball coach for the Wagner Seahawks
- Lewis Sanders (1996), NFL cornerback
- Andrew Wisniewski (1999), basketball player who played overseas
- Teddy Atlas III (2003), NFL scout
- O. D. Anosike (2009), basketball player who plays overseas
- E.J. Anosike (2016 - transferred), basketball player who plays overseas
- Chris Ledlum (2019 - transferred), basketball player who plays overseas

== Notable faculty ==
- Joseph Farrell – American Catholic priest (1873–1960)
- Carl Lesch – American Catholic educator, director, musical conductor (1924–1983)
