= Round Lake Historic District =

Round Lake Historic District can refer to:

- Round Lake Historic District (St. Petersburg, Florida)
- Round Lake Historic District (Round Lake, New York)
