= Ryan Klosterman =

American baseball coach and player (born 1982)

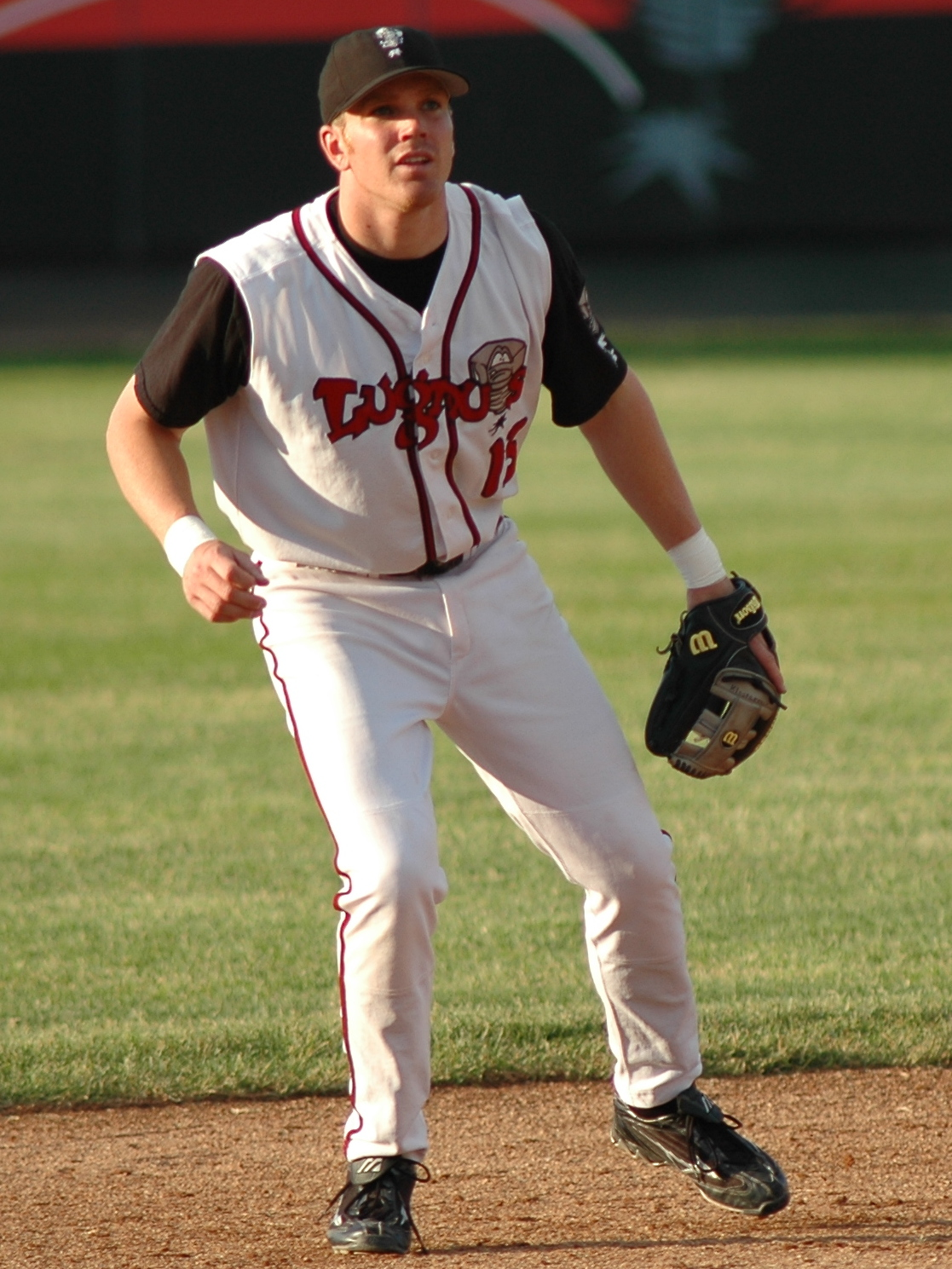
- Klosterman with the Lansing Lugnuts in 2005

Current position
- Title: Head coach
- Team: Bryant
- Conference: America East
- Record: 186–141–2 (.568)

Biographical details
- Born: May 28, 1982 (age 44); Eau Claire, Wisconsin, U.S.

Playing career
- 2001–2002: Clemson
- 2003–2004: Vanderbilt
- 2004: Auburn Doubledays
- 2005: Lansing Lugnuts
- 2006: Dunedin Blue Jays
- 2006–2008: New Hampshire Fisher Cats
- 2009: Jacksonville Suns
- 2009–2011: New Orleans Zephyrs
- 2010: Jupiter Hammerheads
- Position: Shortstop

Coaching career (HC unless noted)
- 2012–2019: UCF (H/RC)
- 2020–present: Bryant

Head coaching record
- Overall: 186–141–2 (.568)
- Tournaments: NCAA: 0–2

Accomplishments and honors

Championships
- NEC regular season (2021); 2 America East regular season (2024, 2025); America East tournament (2024)

Awards
- 2× America East Coach of the Year (2024, 2025); First Team All-SEC (2004)

Ryan P. Klosterman (born May 28, 1982) is an American baseball coach and former shortstop. He is the head baseball coach at Bryant University. Klosterman played college baseball at Clemson University in 2001 and at Vanderbilt University from 2002 to 2004 for coach Tim Corbin and in Minor League Baseball (MiLB) for eight seasons from 2004 to 2011.

Klosterman was born in Eau Claire, Wisconsin. He attended South Lake High School in Groveland, Florida. After graduation from high school, he decided to attend Clemson University to play baseball. After his freshman year, he transferred to play college baseball at Vanderbilt University. After his junior season he was selected in the 5th round of the 2004 Major League Baseball draft by the Toronto Blue Jays.

In 2019, Klosterman was named the head coach of the Bryant Bulldogs baseball program, succeeding Steve Owens.

== Playing career ==
Klosterman attended South Lake High School where he was a member of the school's baseball team. Upon graduation from high school, was intending to enroll at Lake–Sumter State College to play baseball, but when he played at an invitational at Clemson University, he was offered a position to continue his baseball career at Clemson. After using a redshirt as a sophomore at Clemson, Klosterman transferred to Vanderbilt University, following Tim Corbin, who had been an assistant at Clemson. Klosterman became the starting shortstop for the Commodores during the 2003 season. After the 2003 season, he played collegiate summer baseball for the Chatham A's of the Cape Cod Baseball League, and was named a league all-star. As a junior in 2004, Klosterman set the Commodores records for runs scored, and triples in a single season. He was named First Team All-Southeastern Conference following the season.

== Coaching career ==
On July 29, 2019, Klosterman was named the head coach at Bryant University.

Record table
Season	Team	Overall	Conference	Standing	Postseason
Bryant Bulldogs (Northeast Conference) (2020–2022)
2020	Bryant	4–11	0–0		Season canceled due to COVID-19
2021	Bryant	27–14–1	21–4	1st	Northeast Tournament
2022	Bryant	30–27	17–10	2nd	Northeast Tournament
Bryant:		– (–)	38–14 (.731)		
Bryant Bulldogs (America East Conference) (2023–present)
2023	Bryant	26–24	12–12	T–3rd	America East Tournament
2024	Bryant	36–21	17–7	1st	NCAA Regional
2025	Bryant	36–19–1	18–6	1st	America East Tournament
2026	Bryant	27-25	13-11	4th	America East Tournament
Bryant:		186–141–2 (.568)	60–36 (.625)		
Total:		186–141–2 (.568)			
National champion Postseason invitational champion Conference regular season champion Conference regular season and conference tournament champion Division regular season champion Division regular season and conference tournament champion Conference tournament champion

== See also ==
- List of current NCAA Division I baseball coaches
