= 2021 Northeast Conference baseball tournament =

- Teams: 4
- Format: Double-elimination tournament
- Finals site: Senator Thomas J. Dodd Memorial Stadium; Norwich, Connecticut
- Champions: Central Connecticut (7th title)
- Winning coach: Charlie Hickey (7th title)
- MVP: Buddy Dewaine (Central Connecticut)
- Television: NEC Front Row

2021 Northeast Conference baseball standings
| | Conf. | | | | | | Overall |
| Team | W | | L | | T | PCT | W | | L | | T | PCT |
|---|---|---|---|---|---|---|---|---|---|---|---|---|
| Bryant ‍†‍‍ | 21 | – | 4 | – | 0 | .840 | 27 | – | 14 | – | 1 | .655 |
| Central Connecticut ‍‍‡‍^{y} | 21 | – | 9 | – | 0 | .700 | 28 | – | 15 | – | 0 | .651 |
| Sacred Heart ‍‍‍ | 17 | – | 9 | – | 0 | .654 | 23 | – | 25 | – | 0 | .479 |
| LIU ‍‍‍ | 18 | – | 11 | – | 0 | .621 | 20 | – | 15 | – | 0 | .571 |
| Merrimack ‍‍‍ | 13 | – | 14 | – | 0 | .481 | 19 | – | 22 | – | 0 | .463 |
| Fairleigh Dickinson ‍‍‍ | 8 | – | 22 | – | 0 | .267 | 9 | – | 28 | – | 0 | .243 |
| Wagner ‍‍‍ | 7 | – | 22 | – | 0 | .241 | 11 | – | 25 | – | 0 | .306 |
| Mount St. Mary's ‍‍‍ | 5 | – | 19 | – | 0 | .208 | 9 | – | 28 | – | 0 | .243 |
† – Conference champion ‡ – Tournament champion y – Invited to the NCAA tournament As of June 5, 2021; Rankings from D1Baseball

The 2021 Northeast Conference baseball tournament was a postseason baseball tournament for the Northeast Conference in the 2021 NCAA Division I baseball season. The tournament took place from May 27–30, 2021 and was held at Senator Thomas J. Dodd Memorial Stadium in Norwich, Connecticut. It was the first to be held since 2019, as the 2020 tournament was cancelled due to the COVID-19 pandemic. The 28th annual Northeast tournament, Central Connecticut defeated Bryant to earn the Northeast Conference's automatic bid to the 2021 NCAA Division I baseball tournament. The league's top four finishers competed in the double elimination tournament.

== Seeding and format ==
The top four finishers were seeded one through four based on conference regular-season winning percentage. They then played a double-elimination tournament.

== Bracket ==
First round
1 | Bryant | 17
4 | LIU | 13
2 | Central Connecticut | 17
3 | Sacred Heart | 10
Lower round 1
4 | LIU | 4
3 | Sacred Heart | 5

Semi-finals
1 | Bryant | 6
2 | Central Connecticut | 0
Lower final
2 | Central Connecticut | 5
3 | Sacred Heart | 3

Finals
1 | Bryant | 5
2 | Central Connecticut | 7
