= Jamie Pinzino =

American baseball player and coach

Current position
- Title: Pitching coach
- Team: East Tennessee State
- Conference: SoCon

Biographical details
- Born: c. 1975
- Education: Tufts (1997)

Playing career
- 1994–1997: Tufts
- Position: Third Base

Coaching career (HC unless noted)
- 1998: Pomona-Pitzer (assistant)
- 2002: Holy Cross (assistant)
- 2003–2004: Tufts (assistant)
- 2005: Assumption
- 2006–2010: Bryant
- 2011: Northeastern (assistant)
- 2012: William & Mary (assistant)
- 2013: William & Mary
- 2014–2016: Oklahoma (assistant)
- 2017: Virginia Tech (assistant)
- 2018–2020: Army (P)
- 2022–present: East Tennessee State (P)

Head coaching record
- Overall: 212–174
- Tournaments: CAA: 2–2; NCAA: 2–2

Accomplishments and honors

Championships
- Northeast-10 Conference: 2008; Northeast Conference: 2010, 2012, 2013; NEC Tournament: 2013

Awards
- Northeast-10 Conference Coach of the Year: 2007; NEC Coach of the Year: 2010; CAA Coach of the Year: 2013

Jamie Pinzino (born c. 1975) is an American baseball coach and former third baseman, who is the current pitching coach of the East Tennessee State Buccaneer. He played college baseball at Tufts for coach John Casey from 1994 to 1997. Pinzino then served as the head baseball coach for the Assumption Greyhounds (2005), Bryant Bulldogs (2006–2010) and William & Mary (2013), in which the Tribe made the NCAA tournament.

== Playing career ==
Pinzino attended St. John's High School in Shrewsbury, Massachusetts, where he played high school baseball. He also attended Tufts University in Medford, Massachusetts, where he played college baseball for the Jumbos from 1994–1997. With Tufts, Pinzino appeared in one NCAA Division III Tournament.

== Coaching career ==
=== Early career ===
Pinzino coached several high school and American Legion baseball programs from 1997 through 2004. He began his college coaching career as an assistant at Pomona-Pitzer during the 1998 season. His first Division I coaching experience came as an assistant at Holy Cross during the 2002 season. He was then an assistant at Division III Tufts from 2003–2004.

Pinzino received his first collegiate head coaching position with Division II Assumption for the 2005 season. Under Pinzino that season, Assumption had an 11–28 record and finished ninth in the Northeast-10 Conference.

=== Bryant ===
Prior to the 2006 season, Pinzino became the head coach at Bryant, at the time also a member of the Division II Northeast-10 Conference. After an 18–33 season in 2006, Bryant appeared in two consecutive NCAA Division II Tournaments in 2007 and 2008. For the 2009 season, Bryant's athletic programs began a transition to Division I, and the baseball program competed as an Independent. Bryant joined the Northeast Conference (NEC) for the 2010 season and won the regular season conference championship. It did not qualify for the NEC or NCAA tournament, however, because it was ineligible during its transition from Division II. During his tenure at Bryant, Pinzino was twice named conference Coach of the Year– once for the Northeast-10 (2007) and once for the NEC (2010).

Following the 2010 season, Pinzino was involved in an incident that led to his resignation. At a postseason athletic department barbecue in late May, Pinzino became intoxicated, started an altercation with an assistant baseball coach on Bryant's baseball field, and was confrontational with police when they arrived at the scene. Pinzino was arrested and charged with three misdemeanors (simple assault, disorderly conduct, and resisting arrest). As a result, he was forced to resign as Bryant's head coach.

=== William & Mary ===
Following his resignation at Bryant, Pinzino spent two seasons as a Division I assistant. During the 2011 season, he served as the pitching coach at Northeastern. In 2012, he was an assistant to Frank Leoni at William & Mary.

When Leoni resigned as William & Mary's head coach following the 2012 season, Pinzino was hired to replace him. In 2013, Pinzino's first season, William & Mary set program records with 39 wins and 17 conference wins. The team received an at-large bid to the NCAA tournament, where it went 2–2, losing to NC State in the finals of the Raleigh Regional. Pinzino was named a 2013 Colonial Athletic Association Co-Coach of the Year.

=== Oklahoma ===
In October 2013, Oklahoma named Pinzino its pitching coach. He resigned as the Sooners coach in June 2016.

=== Virginia Tech ===
In July 2016, he was named the next pitching coach at Virginia Tech. He was not retained by new head coach John Szefc.

=== Army ===
On July, 13th he was named the next pitching coach for the Black Knights. On May 30, 2020, Pinzino stepped down as the pitching coach at Army for non-baseball reasons.

== Head coaching records ==
Below is a table of Pinzino's yearly records as an NCAA head baseball coach.

Record table
Season	Team	Overall	Conference	Standing	Postseason
Assumption Greyhounds (Northeast-10 Conference (DII)) (2005)
2005	Assumption	11–28	10–18	9th	
Assumption:		11–28 (.282)	10–18 (.357)		
Bryant Bulldogs (Northeast-10 Conference (DII)) (2006–2008)
2006	Bryant	18–33	16–14	6th	Northeast-10 Tournament
2007	Bryant	35–24	21–9	3rd	NCAA Regional
2008	Bryant	43–21	25–5	1st	NCAA Regional
Bryant Bulldogs (Independent (DI)) (2009)
2009	Bryant	32–22			
Bryant Bulldogs (Northeast Conference) (2010)
2010	Bryant	34–22	29–7	1st	
Bryant:		162–122 (.570)	91–35 (.722)		
William & Mary Tribe (Colonial Athletic Association) (2013)
2013	William & Mary	39–24	17–10	2nd	NCAA Regional
William & Mary:		39–24 (.619)	17–10 (.630)		
Total:		212–174 (.549)			
National champion Postseason invitational champion Conference regular season champion Conference regular season and conference tournament champion Division regular season champion Division regular season and conference tournament champion Conference tournament champion

== Personal life ==
Pinzino is married to Cheryl Milligan, head softball coach at Army.
