= Carl Lesch =

American Catholic educator, director, musical conductor (1924–1983)

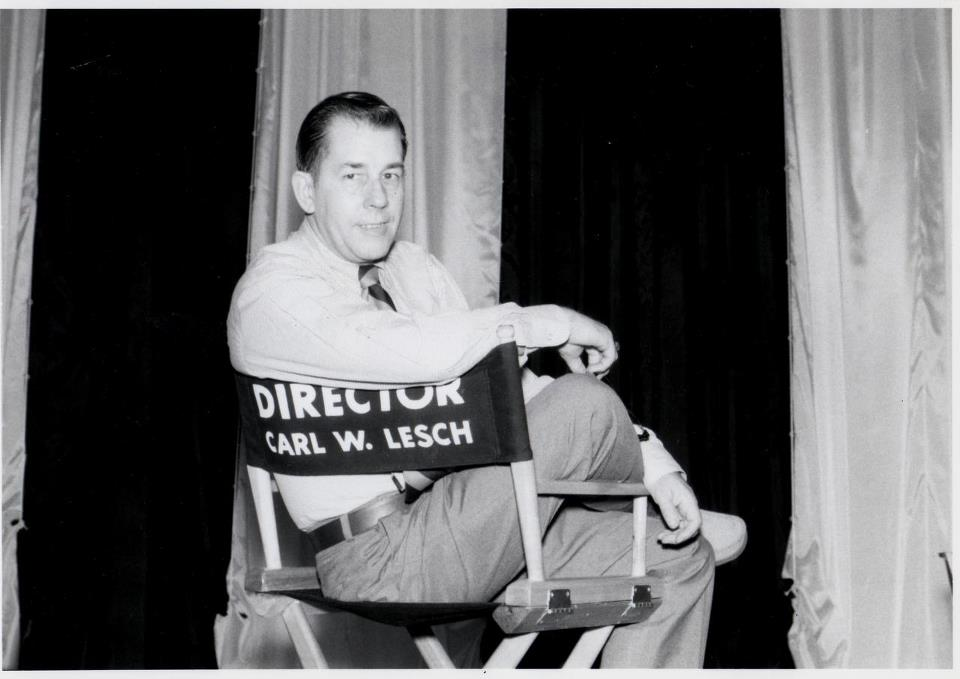
Carl Lesch sitting in his director's chair.

Carl William Lesch (1924–1983) was an American Catholic educator, director, and musical conductor and instructor associated with many institutions in the New York Metropolitan area.

Lesch started his career as a young man in the 1940s when he took over the position of choral director at St. Margaret Mary's Church in Midland Beach, Staten Island. There he organized a new boys choir and eventually led this group, serving as conductor, to the a first-place gold cup victory in a Town Hall music competition. In 1949 he became organist and choirmaster of St. Henry's Church in Bayonne, New Jersey and quickly organized a choir of 60 men and boys who would go on to local fame when their performances began to be broadcast live on The Catholic Hour in 1954 and 1955, as well as concertized throughout the metropolitan area. For 10 years in this era they put on an annual Easter Sunday Concert at the famous Waldorf-Astoria Hotel in Manhattan. From his work at St. Henry's the Archdiocese of Newark promoted Lesch to assistant director of music. In that position he conducted massed choirs inclusive of all of the high schools in the diocese, with performances at Seton Hall University.

Lesch is perhaps most remembered for his work in his home community of Staten Island. He served as director of music, and led the men's and boys' choir, of Sacred Heart Parish on Staten Island from the 1960s until his death. A graduate of St. Peter's Boys High School, he went on to teach there and organized their musical performances for twenty-five years, as well as lent his talents to other island institutions including Monsignor Farrell High School, Moore Catholic High School, and Troubadors of Song Chorus, amongst others, til his death in 1983. His tributes as director from this period include revivals of “Oklahoma!” “Annie Get Your Gun” “South Pacific,” “Hello Dolly,” “Brigadoon,” “On The Town” and “Carousel”, amongst many.

Organized in 2009, the St. Peter's High School Glee Club and Seton Chorale Alumni association, made up of graduates of St. Peter's Boys and St. Peter's Girls High Schools, operates a scholarship fund in honor of Lesch. They have performed a Christmas-time show each December in St. Peter's Church in New Brighton, Staten Island since 2010, which raises money for this fund.
