= Keith MacWhorter =

American baseball player (born 1955)

- Pitcher
- Born: December 30, 1955 (age 70); Worcester, Massachusetts, U.S.
- Batted: Right Threw: Right

MLB debut
- May 10, 1980, for the Boston Red Sox

Last MLB appearance
- October 5, 1980, for the Boston Red Sox

MLB statistics
- Win–loss record: 0–3
- Earned run average: 5.53
- Strikeouts: 21
- Stats at Baseball Reference

Teams
- Boston Red Sox (1980)

Keith MacWhorter (born December 30, 1955) is an American former professional baseball player. The right-handed pitcher appeared in Major League Baseball for the Boston Red Sox during the 1980 season. Listed at 6 feet 4 inches (1.93 m) and 190 pounds (86 kg), he attended Bryant College, where he played college baseball for the Bulldogs.

MacWhorter posted an 0–3 record with a 5.53 ERA in 14 appearances, including two starts, five games finisheds, 21 strikeouts, 18 walks, 46 hits allowed, in 42⅓ innings of work. He also pitched in the minor league systems of the Dodgers (1976), Red Sox (1978–83) and Indians (1984). In an eight-season career, he went 48–56 with 570 strikeouts and a 3.86 ERA in 861 1/3 innings.

== See also ==
- 1980 Boston Red Sox season
