= Conaty Park =

Baseball venue in Rhode Island, US

- Interactive map of Conaty Park
- Former names: Bryant Baseball Complex (2000-2012)
- Location: Campus of Bryant University, John Mowry Road, Smithfield, Rhode Island, US
- Coordinates: 41.925223°N 71.540453°W
- Owner: Bryant University
- Operator: Bryant University
- Capacity: 500
- Surface: Natural grass
- Scoreboard: Electronic
- Field size: 330 feet (LF); 385 feet (LCF); 400 feet (CF); 385 feet (RCF); 300 feet (RF)

Construction
- Built: 2000
- Opened: 2000
- Renovated: 2008

Tenant
- Bryant Bulldogs baseball (NEC) (2000-present)

Conaty Park is a baseball venue in Smithfield, Rhode Island, United States. It is home to the Bryant Bulldogs baseball team of the NCAA Division I Northeast Conference. The facility was opened in 2000 and has a capacity of 500 spectators. It features an electronic scoreboard, bullpens, and dugouts. In 2008, batting cages were added adjacent to the field. Also, the infield has recently been renovated.

Formerly known as the Bryant Baseball Complex, the facility was rededicated as Conaty Park on April 28, 2012, prior to a game against Fairleigh Dickinson. It is named for Bryant alumnus Bill Conaty. Conaty is a published author and former business executive.

In 2004, the facility hosted the NCAA Division II Baseball Northeast Regional, which Bryant won.

== See also ==
- List of NCAA Division I baseball venues
