= Teddy Atlas III =

American football scout

NFLPA Collegiate Bowl
- Title: Scout

Personal information
- Born: 1985 (age 40–41)

Career information
- High school: St. Peter's Boys HS
- College: Northeastern

Career history
- New York Jets (2008) Intern; Cleveland Browns (2009) Football operations assistant; Cleveland Browns (2010) Personnel assistant; Oakland Raiders (2011) Scouting assistant; Oakland Raiders (2012–2018) Scouting coordinator; Oakland/Las Vegas Raiders (2019–2022) Assistant director of college scouting

Teddy Atlas III is an American football scout who served as the assistant director of college scouting of the Las Vegas Raiders.

== Early life ==
Atlas grew up on Staten Island. His father, Teddy Atlas Jr., is a boxing trainer and commentator. Atlas III played basketball, and baseball at St. Peter's Boys High School and boxed some in high school and college. He graduated from Northeastern University with a degree in economics.

== Football career ==
Atlas began his career as an intern in the New York Jets scouting department under Eric Mangini. In 2009, Atlas followed Mangini to the Cleveland Browns as a football operations assistant. In 2010 he was moved to the player personnel department. Mangini and his staff were fired after the 2010 season and Atlas was hired by the Oakland Raiders. In 2012 he was promoted to scouting coordinator. In this role, Atlas evaluated talent, coordinated prospect evaluations, worked out free agents, and arranged advanced scouting reports. In 2019 he was promoted to assistant director of college scouting. He was let go by the Raiders in 2022 and became a scout for the NFLPA Collegiate Bowl.
