= Joseph Farrell (priest) =

American Catholic priest (1873–1960)

The Right Reverend, Monsignor Joseph A. Farrell

Personal details
- Born: April 29, 1873 Manhattan, New York, U.S.
- Died: June 13, 1960 (aged 87) Staten Island, New York
- Occupation: Priest; church pastor; school principal

Ecclesiastical career
- Religion: Catholic
- Church: Saint Ann's Church; Staten Island, New York; (1917–1926); Saint Peter's Church; Staten Island, New York; (1900–1917; 1926–1960)
- Ordained: June 9, 1900

Joseph A. Farrell (April 29, 1873 – June 13, 1960) was an Irish-American Catholic priest who held various positions in the Archdiocese of New York and was instrumental in the construction of new parishes on Staten Island.

He became a priest in 1900, Staten Island's dean of clergy in 1933 and a monsignor in 1935. On Staten Island, he was an early principal of St. Peter's Boys High School.

In 1961, Monsignor Farrell High School was dedicated and named in his honor. The Archbishop of New York at the time, Cardinal Francis Spellman, had written a congratulatory note to Farrell in 1959 on the 60th anniversary of Farrell's ordination, stating that "next high school on Staten Island will bear your honored name."
