= Craig Noto =

American baseball player and coach

Current position
- Title: Head coach
- Team: Wagner
- Conference: Northeast
- Record: 106–110

Playing career
- 1989–1992: John Jay

Coaching career (HC unless noted)
- 1993–1996, 2001: St. Peter's Boys HS (asst)
- 2004–2005: St. Joseph by the See HS (asst)
- 2006–2014: LIU Brooklyn (P/C/RC)
- 2015–2021: Wagner (P/RC)
- 2022–present: Wagner

Head coaching record
- Overall: 106–110
- Tournaments: NCAA: 0–0

Craig Noto is an American baseball coach and former player, who is the current head baseball coach of the Wagner Seahawks. He played college baseball at John Jay.

== Playing career ==
Noto attended St. Peter's Boys High School and played college baseball at John Jay.

== Coaching career ==
Noto began his coaching career at his alma mater, St. Peter's Boys High School. He then became and assistant coach of St. Joseph by the Sea High School. In 2006, Noto became an assistant coach at LIU Brooklyn. Following a 9-year stint as an assistant with the Blackbirds, he took an assistant position with the Wagner Seahawks.

On May 25, 2021, Noto was named the head coach of the Wagner Seahawks.

== Head coaching record ==
Record table
Season	Team	Overall	Conference	Standing	Postseason
Wagner Seahawks (Northeast Conference) (2022–present)
2022	Wagner	17–34	12–15	6th	
2023	Wagner	32–24	21–9	2nd	Northeast Tournament
2024	Wagner	26–30	21–12	4th	Northeast Tournament
2025	Wagner	31–22	23–7	3rd	Northeast Tournament
Wagner:		106–110	77–43		
Total:		106–110			
National champion Postseason invitational champion Conference regular season champion Conference regular season and conference tournament champion Division regular season champion Division regular season and conference tournament champion Conference tournament champion
