= James Rispoli =

American government official (born 1947)

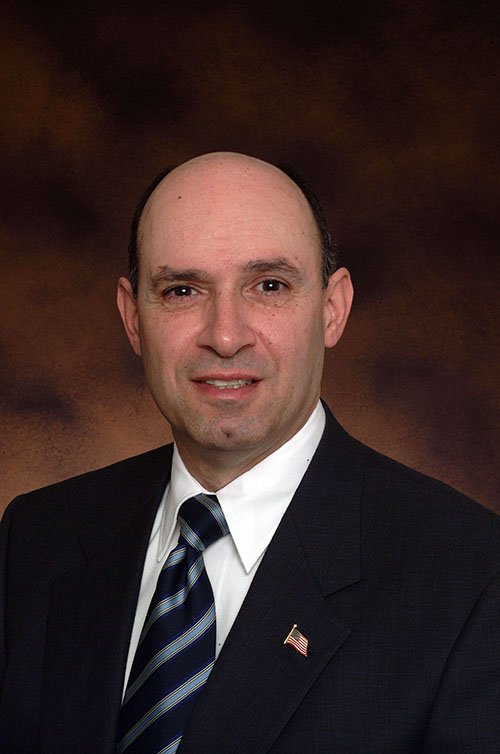
- Born: February 6, 1947 (age 79); Staten Island, New York, U.S.
- Education: Manhattan College (BE); University of New Hampshire (MS); Central Michigan University (MA)

James Anthony Rispoli (born February 6, 1947) is a former Assistant Secretary of Energy for Environmental Management who served for three and a half years under the administration of President George W. Bush; he was unanimously confirmed by the Senate in July 2005. and resigned in late November 2008. His position was occasionally called cleanup czar in the press.

== Early life and education ==
Born on Staten Island in New York City, Rispoli graduated from St. Peter's High School For Boys in 1964. He holds a Bachelor of Engineering degree in civil engineering from Manhattan College in 1968, a Master of Science degree in civil engineering from the University of New Hampshire in 1969, as well as a Master of Arts degree in business management from Central Michigan University in 1977.

== Career ==
His previous position was as Director of the United States Department of Energy's (DOE's) Office of Energy and Construction Management. Rispoli also had private sector experience as an engineering and construction management executive. He is a Distinguished Member of the American Society of Civil Engineers (ASCE), and a Fellow of the Society of American Military Engineers. A past board member of ASCE, he is active professionally, is an American Academy of Environmental Engineers' Board Certified Environmental Engineer, and a member of the National Academy of Construction.

Rispoli started his career as an active duty United States Air Force officer from 1968 to 1973. He then served as a reserve officer and Air Force civilian employee until 1974, when he was recalled to active duty as a United States Navy lieutenant. Rispoli served the majority of his military career as a Navy Civil Engineer Corps officer, retiring at the grade of Captain in 1995. He received three awards of the Legion of Merit and five awards of the Meritorious Service Medal. Prior to his presidential appointment, he was a career executive in the Department of Energy, the Director, Office of Engineering and Construction Management. He is currently a senior executive advisor with the engineering firm PT&C LLC, an ENR-ranked program and construction management firm; and a professor of the Practice at North Carolina State University's Center for Nuclear Energy Facilities and Structures.
