= Round Lake Historic District (St. Petersburg, Florida) =

Historic district in Florida, United States

- U.S. National Register of Historic Places
- U.S. Historic district
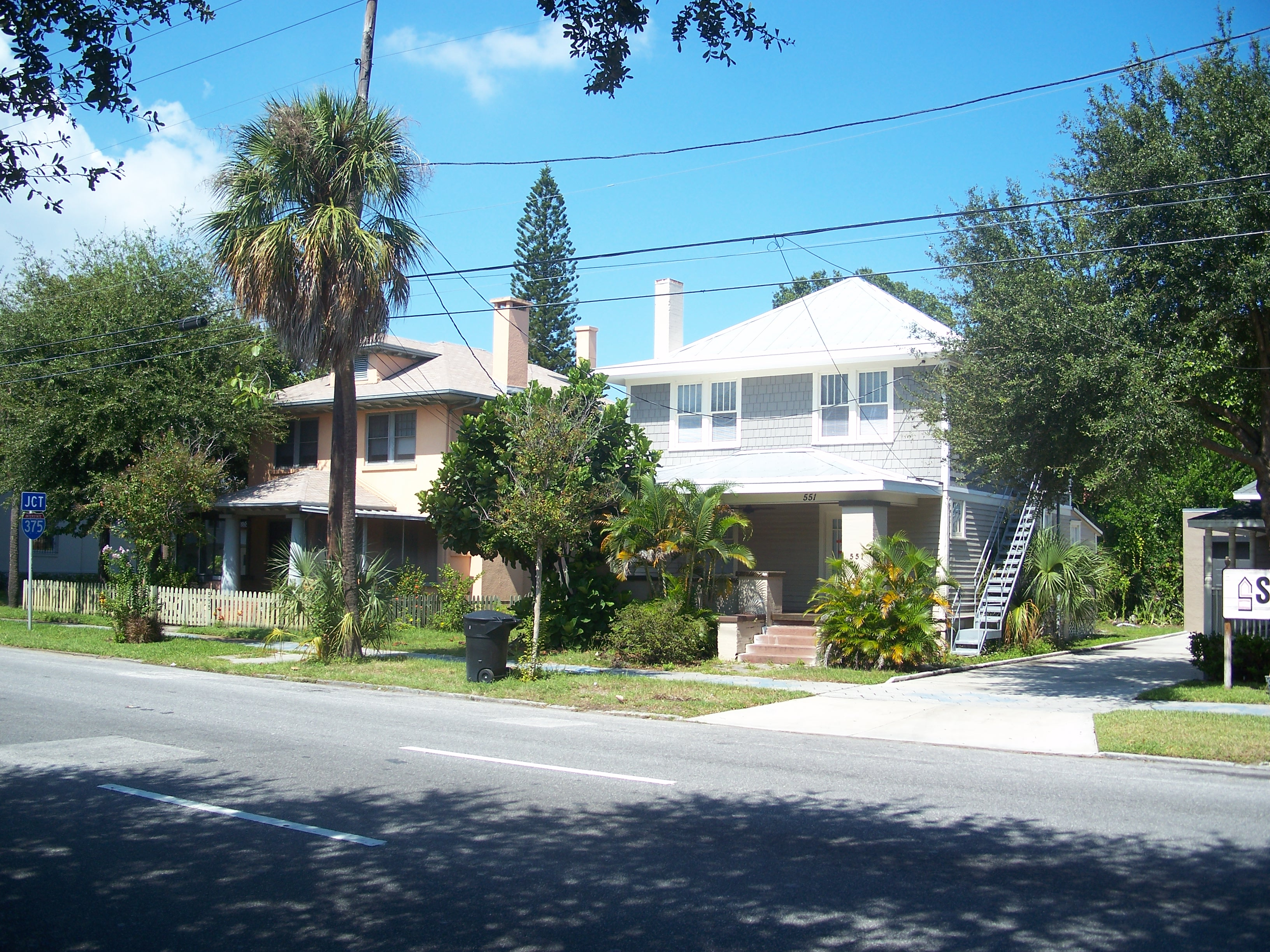

- Location within Florida Location within the United States
- Location: St. Petersburg, Florida
- Coordinates: 27°46′51″N 82°38′28″W
- Area: 1,600 acres (6.5 km^{2})
- NRHP reference No.: 03000824
- Added to NRHP: September 29, 2003

The Round Lake Historic District (also known as Round Lake Residential Neighborhood) is a U.S. historic district (designated as such on September 29, 2003) located in St. Petersburg, Florida. The district is roughly bounded by 5th Avenue N, 9th Street N, 13th Avenue N, and 4th Street N. It contains 1000 historic buildings. Recently, it merged with several other neighborhoods - including S. Crescent and Uptown to become the Historic Uptown Neighborhood.
