= Wagner Seahawks baseball =

College Baseball Team

Wagner Seahawks
- 2026 Wagner Seahawks baseball team
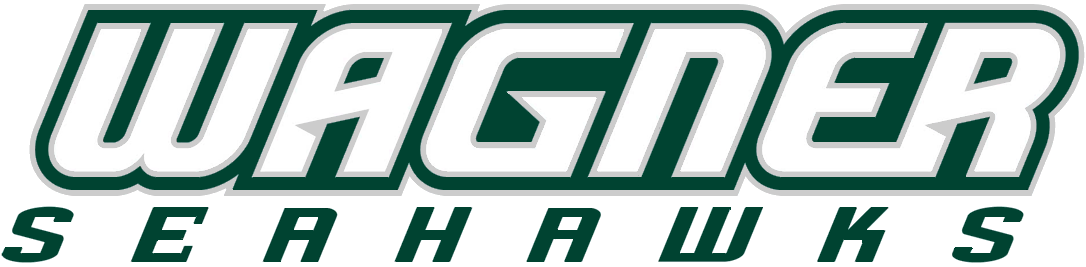
- Founded: 1945
- University: Wagner College
- Head coach: Craig Noto (5th season)
- Conference: Northeast Conference
- Location: Staten Island, New York
- Home stadium: SIUH Community Park (capacity: 7,171)
- Colors: Green and white

NCAA tournament appearances
- 2000

Conference tournament champions
- NEC: 2000

Conference regular season champions
- NEC: 2009

The Wagner Seahawks baseball team is a varsity intercollegiate athletic team of Wagner College in Staten Island, New York, United States. The team has been a member of the Northeast Conference, which is part of the National Collegiate Athletic Association's Division I, since 1987. Wagner College's first baseball team was first fielded in 1945. The Seahawks are coached by Craig Noto. The Seahawks have won one Northeast Conference baseball tournament and one Northeast Conference regular season championship, in 2000 and 2009 respectively. Wagner has appeared in the NCAA Division I Baseball Championship once, in 2000.

== History ==
From 2008 to 2020, the team played its home games at Richmond County Bank Ballpark in Staten Island, New York. However, when the Staten Island Yankees folded in 2020, the ballpark temporarily closed and left the Seahawks without a home stadium. The Seahawks played part of the 2020 season (which was later suspended in March due to the COVID-19 pandemic) as a road team. In 2021, they played a majority of their home games at FirstEnergy Park in Lakewood, New Jersey. In 2022, they played eight home games at the Trenton Thunder Ballpark in Trenton, New Jersey, and another 12 home games at ShoreTown Ballpark (previously known as FirstEnergy Park). Beginning with the 2022 season, the university reached an agreement to use SIUH Community Park on Staten Island.

Wagner moved to Division I in 1976 joining the ECAC and played its home games on campus at Bill Willets field. From 1956 to 1980, Wagner had only 4 winning seasons. Wagner Athletic Director PJ Carlesimo hired Staten Island Hall of Famer, Larry Anderson to take over the program in the fall of 1980. Playing a full D-I schedule, the team finished 15-10 in the fall of 1980 and 18-12 in the 1981 spring regular season. Wagner was awarded the school's first NCAA playoff berth, an At-Large NCAA D-I District II post-season berth (equivalent to today's NCAA Regional round) hosted by St. John's University. Wagner lost the opener in the double elimination District tournament to NCAA #4 ranked St. John's 7–1 before eliminating Long Island University (23-11) 4-2 and Seton Hall University (33-11) 5–2. Wagner was eliminated in the District Final by St. John's 4-2 (St. John's, 34–4, was led by future MLB pitchers Frank Viola and John Franco). Wagner finished the 1981 campaign with a school record 20 wins (finishing 20–14 with three of the losses to St. John's). Key players were pitchers Frank Rizzuto (3-0), Curt Banos (3-1) and James Murphy who had 8 of the school's 20 wins. Offensive leaders included ECAC Player of the Year, outfielder Michael Taylor, infielders Dan Cugini, NCAA District Playoff MVP, shortstop Thomas Weber and outfielders Harold Brantley and Randy De Meno (a Seton Hall transfer, De Meno led NCAA D-I with 10 consecutive hits and 12 consecutive times reaching base safely during the 1981 season).

== NCAA Tournament ==
Wagner has participated in the NCAA Division I baseball tournament once.

Year	Region	Round	Opponent	Result
2000	Tallahassee Super Regional	First Round; Lower Round 1	Miami; FIU	L 5–19; L 1–10

== See also ==
- List of NCAA Division I baseball programs
