= William J. Conaty =

American businessman

William J. Conaty is an American businessman.

== Biography ==
=== Early life ===
He was born in Binghamton, New York. He graduated from Bryant College in Smithfield, Rhode Island, class of '67.

=== Career ===
He joined General Electric in 1976. From 1993 to 2007, he served as its main human resources officer. He chaired the National Academy of Human Resources and the Human Resource Policy Association.

In 2007, he founded Conaty Consulting. His clients include Clayton, Dubilier & Rice, Procter & Gamble, Dell and Boeing. He sits on the board of directors of the Goodyear Tire and Rubber Company.

He served on the board of trustees of the Sacred Heart University in Fairfield, Connecticut, and currently sits on the board of his alma mater, Bryant University, where the baseball and softball complex was renamed Conaty Park in 2012. He sits on the advisory board of the Center for Advanced Human Resource Studies at Cornell University. He also sits and the board of trustees of the Dartmouth–Hitchcock Medical Center.

== Bibliography ==
- The Talent Masters: Why Smart Leaders Put People Before Numbers (with Ram Charan, 2010)
